= 1923 United States House of Representatives elections =

There were several special elections to the United States House of Representatives in 1923, spanning the 67th United States Congress and 68th United States Congress.

== 67th Congress ==
District	Incumbent			This race	
District	Member	Party	First elected	Results	Candidates
California 5	John I. Nolan	Republican	1912	Incumbent died November 18, 1922. New member elected January 23, 1923. Republican hold. Winner also elected to the next term; see below.	▌ ✓ Mae Nolan (Republican) 40.31%; ▌Edwin G. Bath (Republican) 33.28%; ▌George G. Kidwell (Farmer–Labor) 12.49%; ▌M. J. McGuire (Progressive) 7.15%; ▌W. Estes Von Krakau (Republican) 3.26%; ▌Clarence A. Henning (Democratic) 2.90%; ▌Frederick V. Weiss (Independent) 0.61%
New York 19	Samuel Marx	Democratic	1922	Member-elect died November 30, 1922. New member elected January 30, 1923. Democratic hold.	▌ ✓ Sol Bloom (Democratic) 49.83%; ▌Walter M. Chandler (Republican) 49.30%; ▌Philip Zausner (Socialist) 0.87%

== 68th Congress ==
District	Incumbent			This race	
District	Member	Party	First elected	Results	Candidates
California 5	John I. Nolan	Republican	1912	Incumbent member-elect died during previous congress. New member elected January 23, 1923. Republican hold. Winner also elected to finish the current term; see above.	▌ ✓ Mae Nolan (Republican) 47.41%; ▌Edwin G. Bath (Republican) 39.35%; ▌M. J. McGuire (Progressive) 8.48%; ▌Clarence A. Henning (Democratic) 4.77%
Illinois 2	Vacant			Rep. James R. Mann (R) died during previous congress. New member elected April 3, 1923. Republican gain.	▌ ✓ Morton D. Hull (Republican) 53.91%; ▌Barratt O'Hara (Democratic) 40.58%; ▌Seymour Stedman (Socialist) 5.51%
California 10	Vacant			Rep. Henry Z. Osborne (R) died during previous congress. New member elected May 1, 1923. Republican gain.	▌ ✓ John D. Fredericks (Republican) 36.16%; ▌Henry Z. Osborne Jr. (Republican) 23.31%; ▌Lloy Galpin (Democratic) 17.70%; ▌Alfred L. Bartlett (Republican) 11.40%; ▌Frank A. McDonald (Republican) 7.58%; ▌John C. Bell (Prohibition) 2.41%; ▌Upton Sinclair (Independent) 1.43%
Iowa 8	Horace M. Towner	Republican	1910	Incumbent resigned April 1, 1923 to become Governor of Puerto Rico. New member elected June 19, 1923. Republican hold.	▌ ✓ Hiram K. Evans (Republican) 52.63%; ▌J. P. Daughton (Democratic) 47.37%
Michigan 3	John M. C. Smith	Republican	1910; 1920 (retired); 1921 (special)	Incumbent died March 30, 1923. New member elected June 19, 1923. Republican hold.	▌ ✓ Arthur B. Williams (Republican) 57.52%; ▌Claude S. Carney (Democratic) 42.48%
Alabama 2	John R. Tyson	Democratic	1920	Incumbent died March 27, 1923. New member elected August 14, 1923. Democratic hold.	▌ ✓ J. Lister Hill (Democratic); Unopposed
Washington 5	J. Stanley Webster	Republican	1918	Incumbent resigned May 8, 1923 to become a U.S. District Court Judge. New member elected September 25, 1923. Democratic gain.	▌ ✓ Samuel B. Hill (Democratic) 51.04%; ▌Charles F. Myers (Republican) 48.96%
Arkansas 6	Lewis E. Sawyer	Democratic	1922	Incumbent died May 5, 1923. New member elected October 6, 1923. Democratic hold.	▌ ✓ James B. Reed (Democratic); Unopposed
Illinois 4	John W. Rainey	Democratic	1918 (special)	Incumbent died May 4, 1923. New member elected November 6, 1923. Democratic hold.	▌ ✓ Thomas A. Doyle (Democratic) 95.01%; ▌Edward W. Eshelman (Socialist) 4.99%
New York 11	Daniel J. Riordan	Democratic	1898; 1900 (retired); 1906 (special)	Incumbent died April 28, 1923. New member elected November 6, 1923. Democratic hold.	▌ ✓ Anning S. Prall (Democratic) 72.89%; ▌Guy O. Walser (Republican) 25.76%; ▌Walter Dearing (Socialist) 1.35%
New York 16	Vacant			Rep. W. Bourke Cockran died during previous congress. New member elected November 6, 1923. Democratic hold.	▌ ✓ John J. O'Connor (Democratic) 74.34%; ▌John C. O'Connor (Republican) 22.32%; ▌Philip Zausner (Socialist) 3.34%
New York 24	James V. Ganly	Democratic	1922	Incumbent died September 7, 1923. New member elected November 6, 1923. Republican gain.	▌ ✓ Benjamin L. Fairchild (Republican) 48.95%; ▌Edward R. Koch (Republican) 43.27%; ▌Alexander Braunstein (Socialist) 7.78%
New York 32	Luther W. Mott	Republican	1912	Incumbent died September 7, 1923. New member elected November 6, 1923. Democratic hold.	▌ ✓ Thaddeus C. Sweet (Republican) 65.12%; ▌Daniel C. Burke (Democratic) 33.35%; ▌James A. Manson (Socialist) 1.53%
North Carolina 2	Claude Kitchin	Democratic	1900	Incumbent died May 31, 1923. New member elected November 6, 1923. Democratic hold.	▌ ✓ John H. Kerr (Democratic); Unopposed
Vermont 2	Porter H. Dale	Republican	1914	Incumbent resigned August 11, 1923 to run for U.S. Senator. New member elected November 6, 1923. Republican hold.	▌ ✓ Ernest W. Gibson (Republican) 27.93%; ▌Orlando L. Martin (Republican) 23.02%; ▌Mason S. Stone (Republican) 16.60%; ▌John Warren Gordon (Republican) 15.74%; ▌Charles A. Webb (Republican) 12.48%; ▌James L. Stacey (Republican) 4.23%
Mississippi 3	Benjamin G. Humphreys II	Democratic	1902	Incumbent died October 16, 1923. New member elected November 27, 1923. Democratic hold.	▌ ✓ William Y. Humphreys (Democratic) 54.91%; ▌J. C. Roberts (Democratic) 45.09%
Kentucky 7	J. Campbell Cantrill	Democratic	1908	Incumbent died September 2, 1923. New member elected November 30, 1923. Democratic hold.	▌ ✓ Joseph W. Morris (Democratic); Unopposed
