= 1921 United States House of Representatives elections =

There were special elections to the U.S. House of Representatives in 1921.

District	Incumbent			This race	
District	Member	Party	First elected	Results	Candidates
Alabama 4	Fred L. Blackmon	Democratic	1910	Incumbent died February 8, 1921. New member elected June 7, 1921. Democratic hold.	▌ ✓ Lamar Jeffers (Democratic); [data missing]
Arkansas 6	Samuel M. Taylor	Democratic	1912	Incumbent died September 13, 1921. New member elected October 25, 1921. Democratic hold.	▌ ✓ Chester W. Taylor (Democratic); Unopposed
California 9	Vacant			Representative-elect Charles F. Van de Water (R) died November 20, 1920. New member elected February 15, 1921. Republican hold.	▌ ✓ Walter F. Lineberger (Republican) 58.54%; ▌Charles Hiram Randall (Prohibition) 37.99%; ▌John J. Hamilton (Independent) 3.47%
Iowa 5	James W. Good	Republican	1908	Incumbent resigned June 15, 1921. New member elected. Republican hold.	▌ ✓ Cyrenus Cole (Republican) 60.61%; ▌John N. Hughes (Democratic) 39.39%
Massachusetts 6	Willfred W. Lufkin	Republican	1917 (special)	Incumbent resigned June 30, 1921. New member elected. Republican hold.	▌ ✓ A. Piatt Andrew (Republican) 76.58%; ▌Charles I. Pettingell (Democratic) 23.02%
Michigan 3	William H. Frankhauser	Republican	1920	Incumbent died May 9, 1921. New member elected June 28, 1921. Republican hold.	▌ ✓ John M. C. Smith (Republican) 75.42%; ▌Howard W. Cavenaugh (Democratic) 24.58%
Pennsylvania at-large	Mahlon M. Garland	Republican	1914	Incumbent died November 19, 1920. New member elected September 20, 1921. Republican hold.	▌ ✓ Thomas S. Crago (Republican) 68.41%; ▌John P. Bracken (Democratic) 21.45%; ▌Byron E. P. Prugh (Prohibition) 7.25%; ▌Cora M. Bixler (Socialist) 2.89%
