= Robert W. Glover =

American politician (1866-1956)

Member of the Arkansas House of Representatives from the Grant County district
- In office January 9, 1905 – January 11, 1909
- Preceded by: John L. Butler
- Succeeded by: Thomas E. Toler

Member of the Arkansas Senate from the Ninth district
- In office January 11, 1909 – January 13, 1913
- Preceded by: Rueben R. Adams
- Succeeded by: Thomas E. Toler

Personal details
- Born: November 15, 1866 Grant County, Arkansas
- Died: March 29, 1956 (aged 89) Grant County, Arkansas
- Party: Democratic
- Spouse: Mary A. Young (m. 1889–1956)
- Children: 7

Robert W. Glover (November 15, 1866 - March 29, 1956) was an American politician who served in the Arkansas General Assembly.

== Biography ==
Glover was born in Grant County, Arkansas to William H. & Margarate C. (née Crowson) Glover, a prominent family in the settlement of the county. He attended local schools, graduating from Sheridan High School. Following graduation Glover worked as a farmer and teacher for ten years before seeking public office. Glover served as Grant County Assessor from 1896 to 1900.

He served in the Arkansas House from 1905 to 1909. In 1907 he announced his campaign for senate. In 1909 he was elected to the Arkansas Senate representing the Ninth District, which included Grant, Saline and Hot Spring counties.

In 1909 he introduced the resolution calling for the establishment of four state agricultural colleges. He was appointed postmaster of Sheridan on April 4, 1917, and was elected county judge, serving from 1923 to 1925.

His brother David Delano Glover was a U.S. congressman. His son Conrad Nathan Glover became a religious leader and wrote a memoir.

== Bibliography ==
- Priest, Sharon (1998). Runnells, Jonathan (ed.). Historical Report of the Arkansas Secretary of State. Office of the Arkansas Secretary of State. OCLC 40157815.
