= 68th United States Congress =

1923-1925 U.S. Congress

←	67th	69th	→
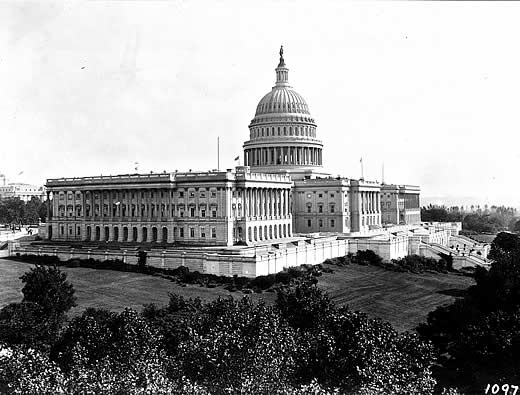
- United States Capitol (1906)

Overview
- Legislative body: United States Congress
- Jurisdiction: United States
- Term: March 4, 1923 – March 4, 1925

Senate
- Members: 96
- President: Calvin Coolidge (R) (Note: U.S. Vice President Coolidge's term as President of the Senate ended on August 2, 1923, when he ascended to the presidency. President pro tempore Albert B. Cummins acted his duties as the president of the Senate prior to the ratification of the Twenty-fifth Amendment.) (until August 2, 1923); Vacant (from August 2, 1923)
- President pro tempore: Albert B. Cummins (R)
- Party control: Republican

House of Representatives
- Members: 435 representatives 5 non-voting delegates
- Speaker: Frederick H. Gillett (R)
- Party control: Republican

Sessions
- 1st: December 3, 1923 – June 7, 1924
- 2nd: December 1, 1924 – March 3, 1925

The 68th United States Congress was a meeting of the legislative branch of the United States federal government, consisting of the United States Senate and the United States House of Representatives. It met in Washington, D.C., from March 4, 1923, to March 4, 1925, during the last months of Warren G. Harding's presidency, and the first years of the administration of his successor, Calvin Coolidge. The apportionment of seats in the House of Representatives was based on the 1910 United States census.

Both chambers maintained a Republican majority—albeit greatly reduced from the previous Congress and with losing supermajority status in the House—and along with President Harding, the Republicans maintained an overall federal government trifecta.

== Major events ==
- August 2, 1923: President Warren G. Harding dies, and Vice President Calvin Coolidge becomes President of the United States
- December 3–5, 1923: The election for the House speakership takes 9 ballots

== Major legislation ==
- April 26, 1924: Seed and Feed Loan Act
- May 19, 1924: World War Adjusted Compensation Act (Bonus Bill), Sess. 1, ch. 157, 43 Stat. 121
- May 24, 1924: Rogers Act
- May 26, 1924: Immigration Act of 1924 (Johnson–Reed Act), Sess. 1, ch. 190, 43 Stat. 153
- May 29, 1924: Indian Oil Leasing Act of 1924 (Lenroot Act)
- June 2, 1924: Indian Citizenship Act of 1924 (Snyder Act), Sess. 1, ch. 233, 43 Stat. 253
- June 2, 1924: Revenue Act of 1924 (Simmons–Longworth Act), Sess. 1, ch. 234, 43 Stat. 253
- June 3, 1924: Inland Waterways Act of 1924 (Denison Act)
- June 7, 1924: Pueblo Lands Act of 1924
- June 7, 1924: Oil Pollution Act of 1924, Pub. L. 68–238, ch. 316, 43 Stat. 604
- June 7, 1924: Clarke–McNary Act, Sess. 1, ch. 348, 43 Stat. 653
- January 30, 1925: Hoch–Smith Resolution
- January 31, 1925: Special Duties Act
- February 2, 1925: Air Mail Act of 1925 (Kelly Act)
- February 12, 1925: Federal Arbitration Act
- February 16, 1925: Home Port Act of 1925
- February 24, 1925: Purnell Act
- February 27, 1925: Temple Act
- February 28, 1925: Classification Act of 1925
- February 28, 1925: Federal Corrupt Practices Act (Gerry Act)
- March 2, 1925: Judiciary Act of 1925
- March 3, 1925: River and Harbors Act of 1925
- March 3, 1925: Helium Act of 1925
- March 4, 1925: Establishment of the United States Navy Band
- March 4, 1925: Probation Act of 1925

== Constitutional amendments ==
- June 2, 1924: Approved an amendment to the United States Constitution that would specifically authorize Congress to regulate "labor of persons under eighteen years of age", and submitted it to the state legislatures for ratification
  - This amendment, commonly known as the Child Labor Amendment, has not been ratified and is still pending before the states.

== Party summary ==
The count below identifies party affiliations at the beginning of the first session of this Congress, and includes members from vacancies and newly admitted states, when they were first seated. Changes resulting from subsequent replacements are shown below.

=== Senate ===
	Party (shading shows control)			Total	Vacant
	Democratic (D)	Farmer– Labor (FL)	Republican (R)	Total	Vacant
End of previous congress	37	0	59	96	0
Begin	42	1	53	96	0
End	42	2	52	96	0
Final voting share	43.8%	2.1%	54.2%		
Beginning of next congress	40	1	55	96	0

=== House of Representatives ===
	Party (shading shows control)				Total	Vacant
	Democratic (D)	Farmer– Labor (FL)	Republican (R)	Socialist (Soc.)	Total	Vacant
End of previous congress	130	0	296	1	427	8
Begin	206	2	223	1	432	3
End	208	2	222	1	433	2
Final voting share	48.0%	0.5%	51.3%	0.2%		
Beginning of next congress	183	3	247	1	434	1

== Leadership ==
Senate president
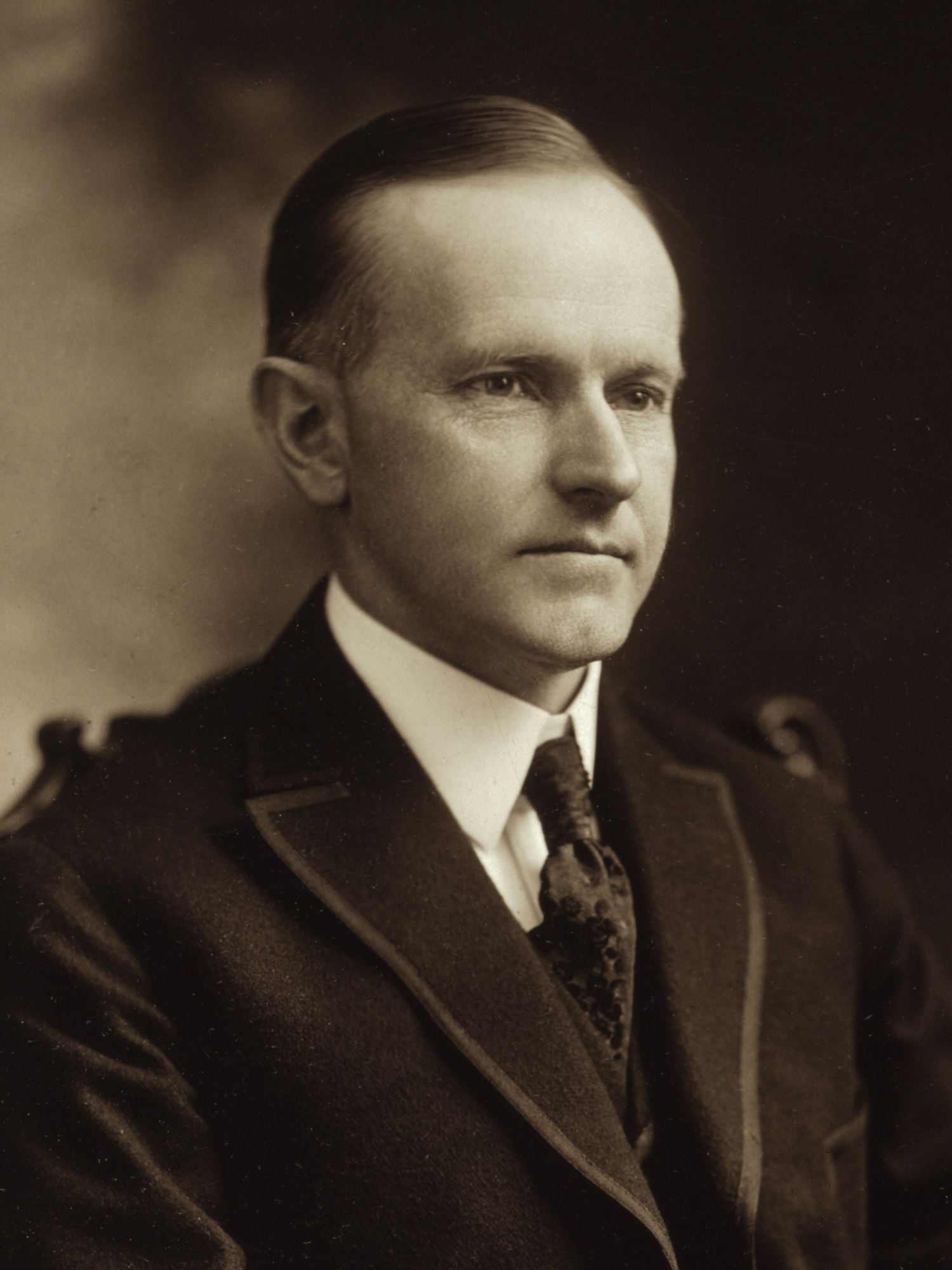
Calvin Coolidge (R)
President pro tempore
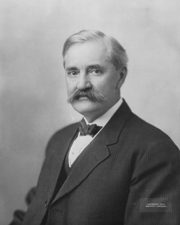
Albert B. Cummins (R)

House Speaker

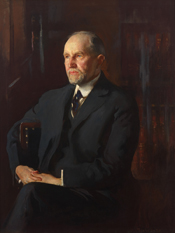
Frederick Gillett (R)

=== Senate ===
- President: Calvin Coolidge (R), until August 3, 1923; vacant thereafter.
- President pro tempore: Albert B. Cummins (R)

==== Majority (Republican) leadership ====
- Majority leader: Charles Curtis
- Majority whip: Wesley L. Jones
- Republican Conference Secretary: James Wolcott Wadsworth Jr.
- National Senatorial Committee Chair: George H. Moses

==== Minority (Democratic) leadership ====
- Minority leader: Joseph T. Robinson
- Minority whip: Peter G. Gerry
- Democratic Caucus Secretary: William H. King

=== House of Representatives ===
- Speaker: Frederick H. Gillett (R) elected December 5, 1923, after 9 rounds of balloting

==== Majority (Republican) leadership ====
- Majority leader: Nicholas Longworth
- Majority Whip: Albert H. Vestal
- Republican Conference Chairman: Sydney Anderson
- Republican Campaign Committee Chairman: William R. Wood

==== Minority (Democratic) leadership ====
- Minority Leader: Finis J. Garrett
- Minority Whip: William Allan Oldfield
- Democratic Caucus Chairman: Henry Thomas Rainey
- Democratic Campaign Committee Chairman: Arthur B. Rouse

== Members ==
This list is arranged by chamber, then by state. Senators are listed by class, and representatives are listed by district.

Skip to House of Representatives, below

=== Senate ===
Senators were elected every two years, with one-third beginning new six-year terms with each Congress. Preceding the names in the list below are Senate class numbers, which indicate the cycle of their election. In this Congress, Class 1 meant their term began in this Congress, requiring re-election in 1928; Class 2 meant their term ended with this Congress, requiring re-election in 1924; and Class 3 meant their term began in the last Congress, requiring re-election in 1926.

==== Alabama ====
▌2. J. Thomas Heflin (D)
▌3. Oscar Underwood (D)

==== Arizona ====
▌1. Henry F. Ashurst (D)
▌3. Ralph H. Cameron (R)

==== Arkansas ====
▌2. Joseph Taylor Robinson (D)
▌3. Thaddeus H. Caraway (D)

==== California ====
▌1. Hiram W. Johnson (R)
▌3. Samuel M. Shortridge (R)

==== Colorado ====
▌2. Lawrence C. Phipps (R)
▌3. Samuel D. Nicholson (R), until March 24, 1923

▌Alva B. Adams (D), from May 17, 1923, until November 30, 1924
▌Rice W. Means (R), from December 1, 1924

==== Connecticut ====
▌1. George P. McLean (R)
▌3. Frank B. Brandegee (R), until October 14, 1924

▌Hiram Bingham III (R), from December 17, 1924

==== Delaware ====
▌1. Thomas F. Bayard Jr. (D)
▌2. L. Heisler Ball (R)

==== Florida ====
▌1. Park Trammell (D)
▌3. Duncan U. Fletcher (D)

==== Georgia ====
▌2. William J. Harris (D)
▌3. Walter F. George (D)

==== Idaho ====
▌2. William E. Borah (R)
▌3. Frank R. Gooding (R)

==== Illinois ====
▌2. J. Medill McCormick (R), until February 25, 1925

▌Charles S. Deneen (R), from February 26, 1925

▌3. William B. McKinley (R)

==== Indiana ====
▌1. Samuel M. Ralston (D)
▌3. James E. Watson (R)

==== Iowa ====
▌2. Smith W. Brookhart (R)
▌3. Albert B. Cummins (R)

==== Kansas ====
▌2. Arthur Capper (R)
▌3. Charles Curtis (R)

==== Kentucky ====
▌2. Augustus O. Stanley (D)
▌3. Richard P. Ernst (R)

==== Louisiana ====
▌2. Joseph E. Ransdell (D)
▌3. Edwin S. Broussard (D)

==== Maine ====
▌1. Frederick Hale (R)
▌2. Bert M. Fernald (R)

==== Maryland ====
▌1. William Cabell Bruce (D)
▌3. Ovington E. Weller (R)

==== Massachusetts ====
▌1. Henry Cabot Lodge (R), until November 9, 1924

▌William M. Butler (R), from November 13, 1924

▌2. David I. Walsh (D)

==== Michigan ====
▌1. Woodbridge N. Ferris (D)
▌2. James J. Couzens (R)

==== Minnesota ====
▌1. Henrik Shipstead (FL)
▌2. Knute Nelson (R), until April 28, 1923

▌Magnus Johnson (FL), from July 16, 1923

==== Mississippi ====
▌1. Hubert D. Stephens (D)
▌2. Pat Harrison (D)

==== Missouri ====
▌1. James A. Reed (D)
▌3. Selden P. Spencer (R)

==== Montana ====
▌1. Burton K. Wheeler (D)
▌2. Thomas J. Walsh (D)

==== Nebraska ====
▌1. Robert B. Howell (R)
▌2. George W. Norris (R)

==== Nevada ====
▌1. Key Pittman (D)
▌3. Tasker Oddie (R)

==== New Hampshire ====
▌2. Henry W. Keyes (R)
▌3. George H. Moses (R)

==== New Jersey ====
▌1. Edward I. Edwards (D)
▌2. Walter E. Edge (R)

==== New Mexico ====
▌1. Andrieus A. Jones (D)
▌2. Holm O. Bursum (R)

==== New York ====
▌1. Royal S. Copeland (D)
▌3. James W. Wadsworth Jr. (R)

==== North Carolina ====
▌3. Lee S. Overman (D)
▌2. Furnifold M. Simmons (D)

==== North Dakota ====
▌1. Lynn Frazier (R-NPL)
▌3. Edwin F. Ladd (R)

==== Ohio ====
▌1. Simeon D. Fess (R)
▌3. Frank B. Willis (R)

==== Oklahoma ====
▌2. Robert L. Owen (D)
▌3. John W. Harreld (R)

==== Oregon ====
▌2. Charles L. McNary (R)
▌3. Robert N. Stanfield (R)

==== Pennsylvania ====
▌1. David A. Reed (R)
▌3. George Wharton Pepper (R)

==== Rhode Island ====
▌1. Peter G. Gerry (D)
▌2. LeBaron B. Colt (R), until August 18, 1924

▌Jesse H. Metcalf (R), from November 5, 1924

==== South Carolina ====
▌2. Nathaniel B. Dial (D)
▌3. Ellison D. Smith (D)

==== South Dakota ====
▌2. Thomas Sterling (R)
▌3. Peter Norbeck (R)

==== Tennessee ====
▌1. Kenneth D. McKellar (D)
▌2. John K. Shields (D)

==== Texas ====
▌1. Earle B. Mayfield (D)
▌2. Morris Sheppard (D)

==== Utah ====
▌1. William H. King (D)
▌3. Reed Smoot (R)

==== Vermont ====
▌1. Frank L. Greene (R)
▌3. William P. Dillingham (R), until July 12, 1923

▌Porter H. Dale (R), from November 7, 1923

==== Virginia ====
▌1. Claude A. Swanson (D)
▌2. Carter Glass (D)

==== Washington ====
▌1. Clarence Cleveland Dill (D)
▌3. Wesley L. Jones (R)

==== West Virginia ====
▌1. Matthew M. Neely (D)
▌2. Davis Elkins (R)

==== Wisconsin ====
▌1. Robert M. La Follette Sr. (R)
▌3. Irvine L. Lenroot (R)

==== Wyoming ====
▌1. John B. Kendrick (D)
▌2. Francis E. Warren (R)

Senators' party membership by state at the opening of the 68th Congress in March 1923. The green stripes denote Farmer-Labor Senator Henrik Shipstead. 2 Democrats 1 Democrat and 1 Republican 2 Republicans

Senate majority leadership

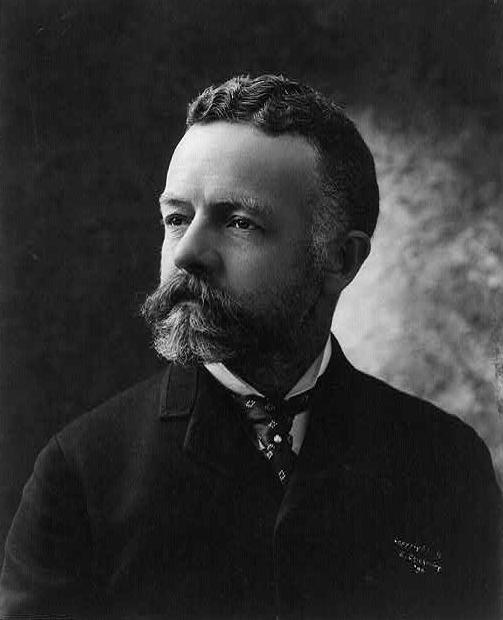
Henry Cabot Lodge
Republican leader (unofficial), until November 9, 1924

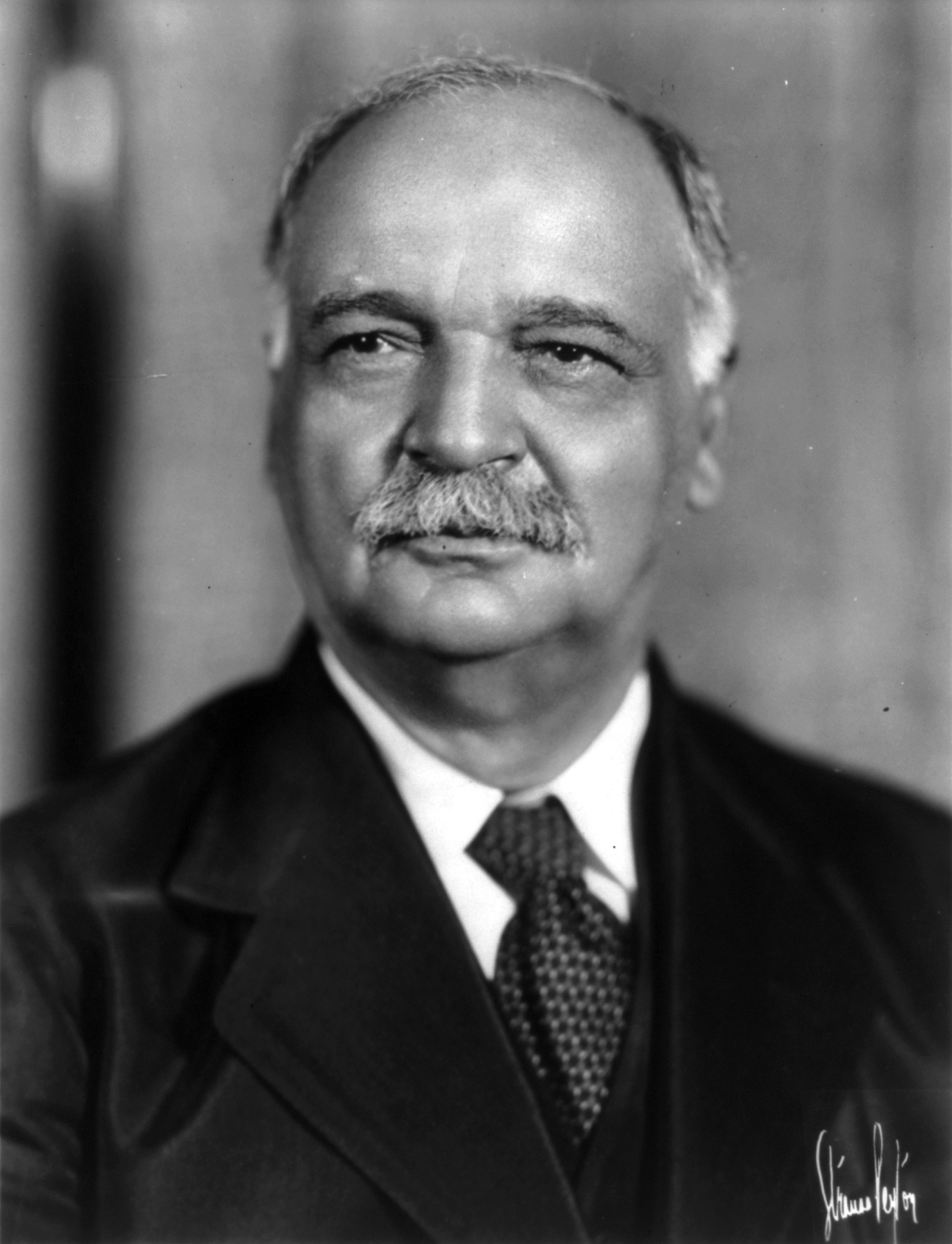
Charles Curtis
Republican leader (unofficial, acting), from November 28, 1924
Republican whip, until November 28, 1924

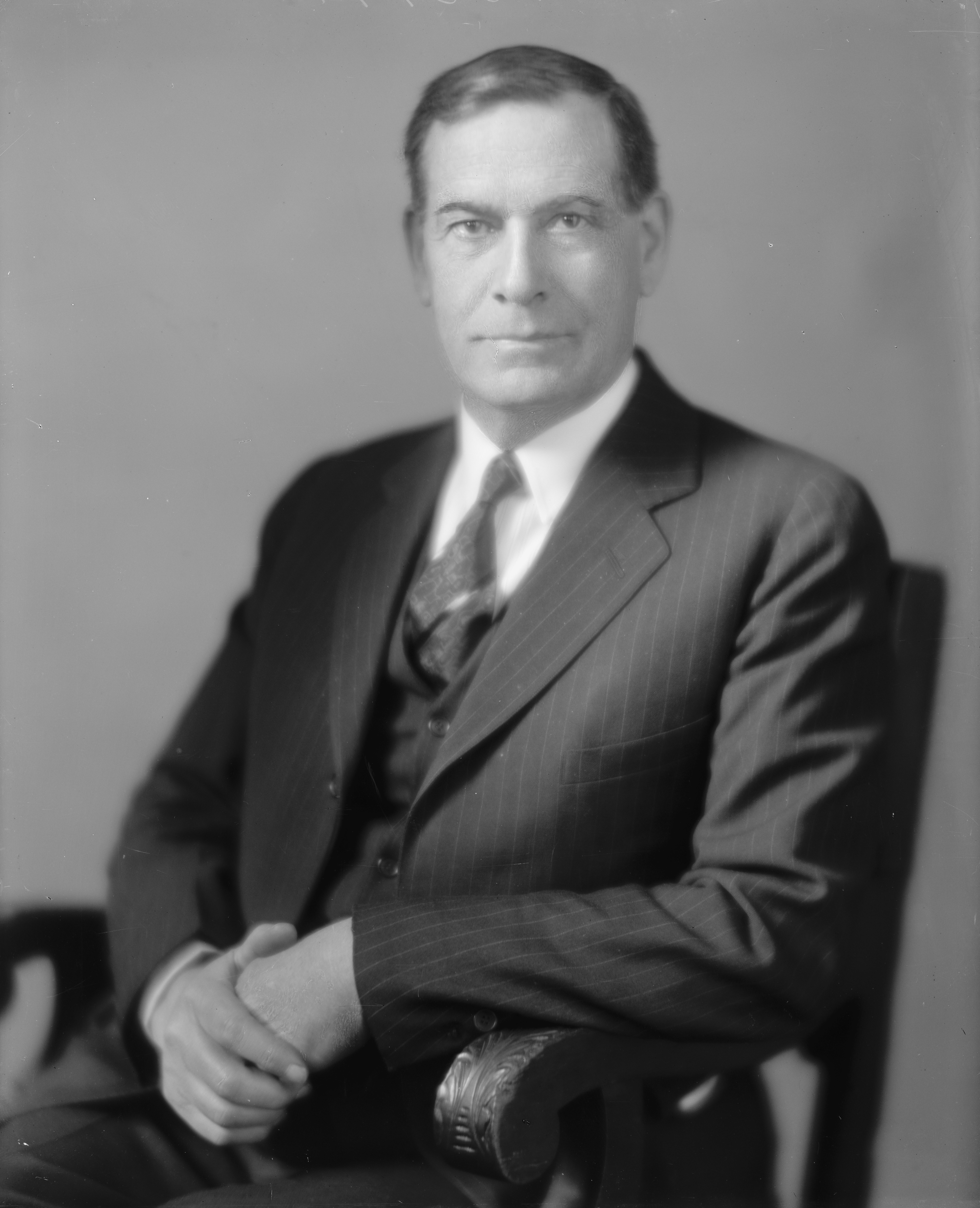
Wesley Jones
Republican whip, from November 28, 1924

Senate minority leadership

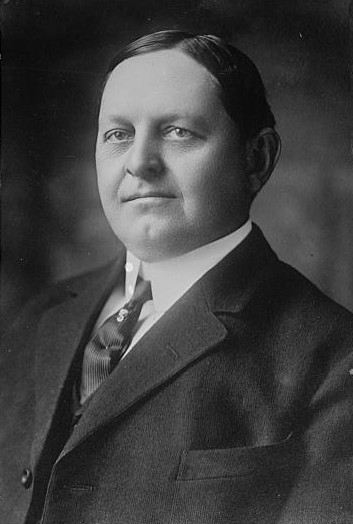
Oscar Underwood
Democratic leader, until December 3, 1923

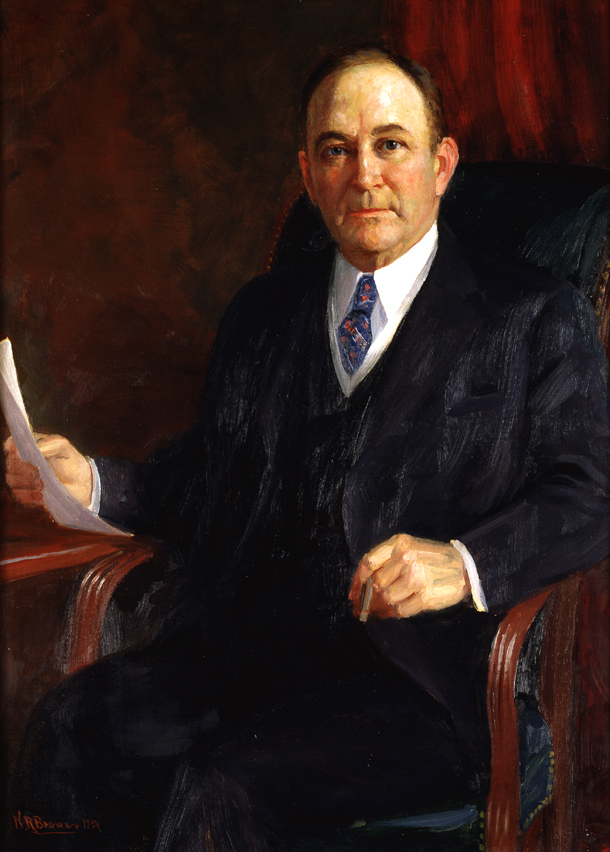
Joseph T. Robinson
Democratic leader, from December 3, 1923

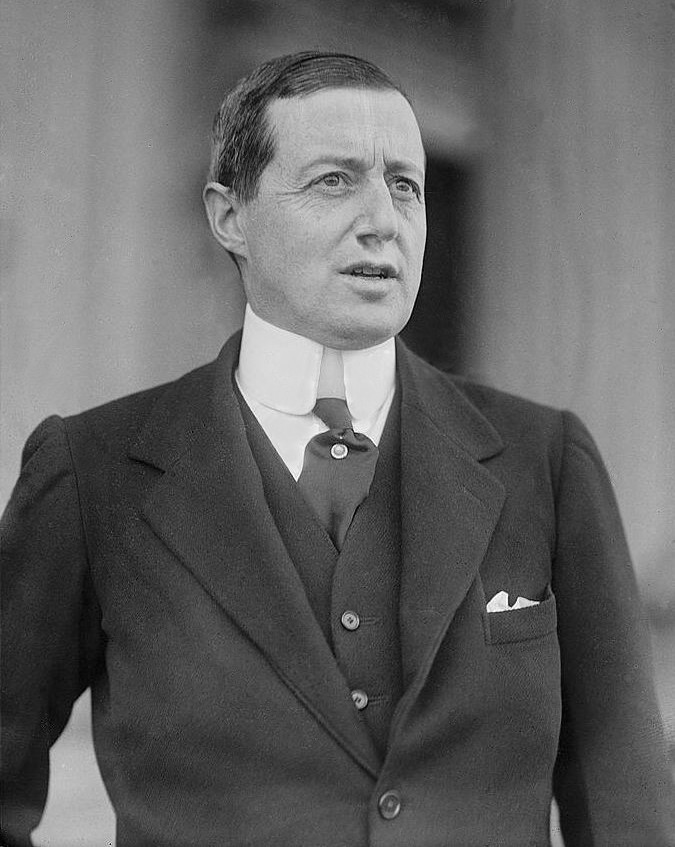
Peter G. Gerry
Democratic whip

=== House of Representatives ===
The names of representatives elected statewide on the general ticket or otherwise at-large, are preceded by their district numbers.

==== Alabama ====
▌1. John McDuffie (D)
▌2. John R. Tyson (D), until March 27, 1923

▌J. Lister Hill (D), from August 14, 1923

▌3. Henry B. Steagall (D)
▌4. Lamar Jeffers (D)
▌5. William B. Bowling (D)
▌6. William B. Oliver (D)
▌7. Miles C. Allgood (D)
▌8. Edward B. Almon (D)
▌9. George Huddleston (D)
▌10. William B. Bankhead (D)

==== Arizona ====
▌At-large. Carl Hayden (D)

==== Arkansas ====
▌1. William J. Driver (D)
▌2. William A. Oldfield (D)
▌3. John N. Tillman (D)
▌4. Otis Wingo (D)
▌5. Heartsill Ragon (D)
▌6. Lewis E. Sawyer (D), until May 5, 1923

▌James B. Reed (D), from October 6, 1923

▌7. Tilman B. Parks (D)

==== California ====
▌1. Clarence F. Lea (D)
▌2. John E. Raker (D)
▌3. Charles F. Curry (R)
▌4. Julius Kahn (R), until December 18, 1924
▌5. Mae E. Nolan (R)
▌6. James H. MacLafferty (R)
▌7. Henry E. Barbour (R)
▌8. Arthur M. Free (R)
▌9. Walter F. Lineberger (R)
▌10. John D. Fredericks (R), from May 1, 1923
▌11. Philip D. Swing (R)

==== Colorado ====
▌1. William N. Vaile (R)
▌2. Charles Bateman Timberlake (R)
▌3. Guy U. Hardy (R)
▌4. Edward T. Taylor (D)

==== Connecticut ====
▌1. E. Hart Fenn (R)
▌2. Richard P. Freeman (R)
▌3. John Q. Tilson (R)
▌4. Schuyler Merritt (R)
▌5. Patrick B. O'Sullivan (D)

==== Delaware ====
▌At-large. William H. Boyce (D)

==== Florida ====
▌1. Herbert J. Drane (D)
▌2. Frank Clark (D)
▌3. John H. Smithwick (D)
▌4. William J. Sears (D)

==== Georgia ====
▌1. R. Lee Moore (D)
▌2. Frank Park (D)
▌3. Charles R. Crisp (D)
▌4. William C. Wright (D)
▌5. William D. Upshaw (D)
▌6. James W. Wise (D)
▌7. Gordon Lee (D)
▌8. Charles H. Brand (D)
▌9. Thomas Montgomery Bell (D)
▌10. Carl Vinson (D)
▌11. William C. Lankford (D)
▌12. William W. Larsen (D)

==== Idaho ====
▌1. Burton L. French (R)
▌2. Addison T. Smith (R)

==== Illinois ====
▌1. Martin B. Madden (R)
▌2. Morton D. Hull (R), from April 3, 1923
▌3. Elliott W. Sproul (R)
▌4. John W. Rainey (D), until May 4, 1923

▌Thomas A. Doyle (D), from November 6, 1923

▌5. Adolph J. Sabath (D)
▌6. James R. Buckley (D)
▌7. M. Alfred Michaelson (R)
▌8. Stanley H. Kunz (D)
▌9. Frederick A. Britten (R)
▌10. Carl R. Chindblom (R)
▌11. Frank R. Reid (R)
▌12. Charles Eugene Fuller (R)
▌13. John C. McKenzie (R)
▌14. William J. Graham (R), until June 7, 1924
▌15. Edward John King (R)
▌16. William E. Hull (R)
▌17. Frank H. Funk (R)
▌18. William P. Holaday (R)
▌19. Allen F. Moore (R)
▌20. Henry T. Rainey (D)
▌21. J. Earl Major (D)
▌22. Edward E. Miller (R)
▌23. William W. Arnold (D)
▌24. Thomas S. Williams (R)
▌25. Edward E. Denison (R)
▌At-large. Henry R. Rathbone (R)
▌At-large. Richard Yates Jr. (R)

==== Indiana ====
▌1. William E. Wilson (D)
▌2. Arthur H. Greenwood (D)
▌3. Frank Gardner (D)
▌4. Harry C. Canfield (D)
▌5. Everett Sanders (R)
▌6. Richard N. Elliott (R)
▌7. Merrill Moores (R)
▌8. Albert H. Vestal (R)
▌9. Fred S. Purnell (R)
▌10. William R. Wood (R)
▌11. Samuel E. Cook (D)
▌12. Louis W. Fairfield (R)
▌13. Andrew J. Hickey (R)

==== Iowa ====
▌1. William F. Kopp (R)
▌2. Harry E. Hull (R)
▌3. Thomas J. B. Robinson (R)
▌4. Gilbert N. Haugen (R)
▌5. Cyrenus Cole (R)
▌6. C. William Ramseyer (R)
▌7. Cassius C. Dowell (R)
▌8. Horace M. Towner (R), until April 1, 1923

▌Hiram K. Evans (R), from June 4, 1923

▌9. William R. Green (R)
▌10. Lester J. Dickinson (R)
▌11. William D. Boies (R)

==== Kansas ====
▌1. Daniel Read Anthony Jr. (R)
▌2. Edward C. Little (R), until June 27, 1924

▌Ulysses S. Guyer (R), from November 4, 1924

▌3. William H. Sproul (R)
▌4. Homer Hoch (R)
▌5. James G. Strong (R)
▌6. Hays B. White (R)
▌7. Jasper N. Tincher (R)
▌8. William A. Ayres (D)

==== Kentucky ====
▌1. Alben Barkley (D)
▌2. David Hayes Kincheloe (D)
▌3. Robert Y. Thomas Jr. (D)
▌4. Ben Johnson (D)
▌5. Maurice H. Thatcher (R)
▌6. Arthur B. Rouse (D)
▌7. J. Campbell Cantrill (D), until September 2, 1923

▌Joseph W. Morris (D), from November 30, 1923

▌8. Ralph W. E. Gilbert (D)
▌9. William Jason Fields (D), until December 11, 1923

▌Fred M. Vinson (D), from January 24, 1924

▌10. John W. Langley (R)
▌11. John M. Robsion (R)

==== Louisiana ====
▌1. James O'Connor (D)
▌2. Henry Garland Dupré (D), until February 21, 1924

▌J. Zach Spearing (D), from April 22, 1924

▌3. Whitmell P. Martin (D)
▌4. John N. Sandlin (D)
▌5. Riley Joseph Wilson (D)
▌6. George K. Favrot (D)
▌7. Ladislas Lazaro (D)
▌8. James Benjamin Aswell (D)

==== Maine ====
▌1. Carroll L. Beedy (R)
▌2. Wallace H. White Jr. (R)
▌3. John E. Nelson (R)
▌4. Ira G. Hersey (R)

==== Maryland ====
▌1. T. Alan Goldsborough (D)
▌2. Millard Tydings (D)
▌3. John Philip Hill (R)
▌4. J. Charles Linthicum (D)
▌5. Sydney Emanuel Mudd II (R), until October 11, 1924

▌Stephen W. Gambrill (D), from November 4, 1924

▌6. Frederick N. Zihlman (R)

==== Massachusetts ====
▌1. Allen T. Treadway (R)
▌2. Frederick H. Gillett (R)
▌3. Calvin D. Paige (R)
▌4. Samuel E. Winslow (R)
▌5. John J. Rogers (R)
▌6. A. Piatt Andrew Jr. (R)
▌7. William P. Connery Jr. (D)
▌8. Frederick W. Dallinger (R)
▌9. Charles L. Underhill (R)
▌10. Peter F. Tague (D)
▌11. George H. Tinkham (R)
▌12. James A. Gallivan (D)
▌13. Robert Luce (R)
▌14. Louis A. Frothingham (R)
▌15. William S. Greene (R), until September 22, 1924

▌Robert M. Leach (R), from November 4, 1924

▌16. Charles L. Gifford (R)

==== Michigan ====
▌1. Robert H. Clancy (D)
▌2. Earl C. Michener (R)
▌3. John M. C. Smith (R), until March 30, 1923

▌Arthur B. Williams (R), from June 19, 1923

▌4. John C. Ketcham (R)
▌5. Carl Mapes (R)
▌6. Grant M. Hudson (R)
▌7. Louis C. Cramton (R)
▌8. Bird J. Vincent (R)
▌9. James C. McLaughlin (R)
▌10. Roy O. Woodruff (R)
▌11. Frank D. Scott (R)
▌12. W. Frank James (R)
▌13. Clarence J. McLeod (R)

==== Minnesota ====
▌1. Sydney Anderson (R)
▌2. Frank Clague (R)
▌3. Charles Russell Davis (R)
▌4. Oscar E. Keller (R)
▌5. Walter H. Newton (R)
▌6. Harold Knutson (R)
▌7. Ole J. Kvale (FL)
▌8. Oscar J. Larson (R)
▌9. Knud Wefald (FL)
▌10. Thomas D. Schall (R)

==== Mississippi ====
▌1. John E. Rankin (D)
▌2. Bill G. Lowrey (D)
▌3. Benjamin G. Humphreys II (D), until October 16, 1923

▌William Y. Humphreys (D), from November 27, 1923

▌4. T. Jefferson Busby (D)
▌5. Ross A. Collins (D)
▌6. T. Webber Wilson (D)
▌7. Percy E. Quin (D)
▌8. James W. Collier (D)

==== Missouri ====
▌1. Milton A. Romjue (D)
▌2. Ralph F. Lozier (D)
▌3. Jacob L. Milligan (D)
▌4. Charles L. Faust (R)
▌5. Henry L. Jost (D)
▌6. Clement C. Dickinson (D)
▌7. Samuel C. Major (D)
▌8. Sidney C. Roach (R)
▌9. Clarence Cannon (D)
▌10. Cleveland A. Newton (R)
▌11. Harry B. Hawes (D)
▌12. Leonidas C. Dyer (R)
▌13. J. Scott Wolff (D)
▌14. James F. Fulbright (D)
▌15. Joe J. Manlove (R)
▌16. Thomas L. Rubey (D)

==== Montana ====
▌1. John M. Evans (D)
▌2. Scott Leavitt (R)

==== Nebraska ====
▌1. John H. Morehead (D)
▌2. Willis G. Sears (R)
▌3. Edgar Howard (D)
▌4. Melvin O. McLaughlin (R)
▌5. Ashton C. Shallenberger (D)
▌6. Robert G. Simmons (R)

==== Nevada ====
▌At-large. Charles L. Richards (D)

==== New Hampshire ====
▌1. William N. Rogers (D)
▌2. Edward Hills Wason (R)

==== New Jersey ====
▌1. Francis F. Patterson Jr. (R)
▌2. Isaac Bacharach (R)
▌3. Elmer H. Geran (D)
▌4. Charles Browne (D)
▌5. Ernest R. Ackerman (R)
▌6. Randolph Perkins (R)
▌7. George N. Seger (R)
▌8. Frank J. McNulty (D)
▌9. Daniel F. Minahan (D)
▌10. Frederick R. Lehlbach (R)
▌11. John J. Eagan (D)
▌12. Charles F. X. O'Brien (D)

==== New Mexico ====
▌At-large. John Morrow (D)

==== New York ====
▌1. Robert L. Bacon (R)
▌2. John J. Kindred (D)
▌3. George W. Lindsay (D)
▌4. Thomas H. Cullen (D)
▌5. Loring M. Black Jr. (D)
▌6. Charles I. Stengle (D)
▌7. John Quayle (D)
▌8. William E. Cleary (D)
▌9. David J. O'Connell (D)
▌10. Emanuel Celler (D)
▌11. Daniel J. Riordan (D), until April 28, 1923

▌Anning S. Prall (D), from November 6, 1923

▌12. Samuel Dickstein (D)
▌13. Christopher D. Sullivan (D)
▌14. Nathan D. Perlman (R)
▌15. John J. Boylan (D)
▌16. John J. O'Connor (D), from November 6, 1923
▌17. Ogden L. Mills (R)
▌18. John F. Carew (D)
▌19. Sol Bloom (D)
▌20. Fiorello H. LaGuardia (R)
▌21. Royal H. Weller (D)
▌22. Anthony J. Griffin (D)
▌23. Frank Oliver (D)
▌24. James V. Ganly (D), until September 7, 1923

▌Benjamin L. Fairchild (R), from November 6, 1923

▌25. J. Mayhew Wainwright (R)
▌26. Hamilton Fish III (R)
▌27. Charles B. Ward (R)
▌28. Parker Corning (D)
▌29. James S. Parker (R)
▌30. Frank Crowther (R)
▌31. Bertrand H. Snell (R)
▌32. Luther W. Mott (R), until July 10, 1923

▌Thaddeus C. Sweet (R), from November 6, 1923

▌33. Homer P. Snyder (R)
▌34. John D. Clarke (R)
▌35. Walter W. Magee (R)
▌36. John Taber (R)
▌37. Gale H. Stalker (R)
▌38. Meyer Jacobstein (D)
▌39. Archie D. Sanders (R)
▌40. S. Wallace Dempsey (R)
▌41. Clarence MacGregor (R)
▌42. James M. Mead (D)
▌43. Daniel A. Reed (R)

==== North Carolina ====
▌1. Hallett S. Ward (D)
▌2. Claude Kitchin (D), until May 31, 1923

▌John H. Kerr (D), from November 6, 1923

▌3. Charles L. Abernethy (D)
▌4. Edward W. Pou (D)
▌5. Charles M. Stedman (D)
▌6. Homer L. Lyon (D)
▌7. William C. Hammer (D)
▌8. Robert L. Doughton (D)
▌9. Alfred L. Bulwinkle (D)
▌10. Zebulon Weaver (D)

==== North Dakota ====
▌1. Olger B. Burtness (R)
▌2. George M. Young (R), until September 2, 1924

▌Thomas Hall (R), from November 4, 1924

▌3. James H. Sinclair (R)

==== Ohio ====
▌1. Nicholas Longworth (R)
▌2. Ambrose E. B. Stephens (R)
▌3. Roy G. Fitzgerald (R)
▌4. John L. Cable (R)
▌5. Charles J. Thompson (R)
▌6. Charles C. Kearns (R)
▌7. Charles Brand (R)
▌8. R. Clinton Cole (R)
▌9. Isaac R. Sherwood (D)
▌10. Israel M. Foster (R)
▌11. Mell G. Underwood (D)
▌12. John C. Speaks (R)
▌13. James T. Begg (R)
▌14. Martin L. Davey (D)
▌15. C. Ellis Moore (R)
▌16. John McSweeney (D)
▌17. William M. Morgan (R)
▌18. B. Frank Murphy (R)
▌19. John G. Cooper (R)
▌20. Charles A. Mooney (D)
▌21. Robert Crosser (D)
▌22. Theodore E. Burton (R)

==== Oklahoma ====
▌1. Everette B. Howard (D)
▌2. William W. Hastings (D)
▌3. Charles D. Carter (D)
▌4. Tom D. McKeown (D)
▌5. Fletcher B. Swank (D)
▌6. Elmer Thomas (D)
▌7. James V. McClintic (D)
▌8. Milton C. Garber (R)

==== Oregon ====
▌1. Willis C. Hawley (R)
▌2. Nicholas J. Sinnott (R)
▌3. Elton Watkins (D)

==== Pennsylvania ====
▌1. William S. Vare (R)
▌2. George S. Graham (R)
▌3. Harry C. Ransley (R)
▌4. George W. Edmonds (R)
▌5. James J. Connolly (R)
▌6. George A. Welsh (R)
▌7. George P. Darrow (R)
▌8. Thomas S. Butler (R)
▌9. Henry W. Watson (R)
▌10. William W. Griest (R)
▌11. Laurence H. Watres (R)
▌12. John J. Casey (D)
▌13. George F. Brumm (R)
▌14. William M. Croll (D)
▌15. Louis T. McFadden (R)
▌16. Edgar R. Kiess (R)
▌17. Herbert W. Cummings (D)
▌18. Edward M. Beers (R)
▌19. Frank C. Sites (D)
▌20. George M. Wertz (R)
▌21. J. Banks Kurtz (R)
▌22. Samuel F. Glatfelter (D)
▌23. William I. Swoope (R)
▌24. Samuel A. Kendall (R)
▌25. Henry W. Temple (R)
▌26. Thomas W. Phillips Jr. (R)
▌27. Nathan L. Strong (R)
▌28. Harris J. Bixler (R)
▌29. Milton W. Shreve (R)
▌30. Everett Kent (D)
▌31. Adam M. Wyant (R)
▌32. Stephen G. Porter (R)
▌33. M. Clyde Kelly (R)
▌34. John M. Morin (R)
▌35. James M. Magee (R)
▌36. Guy E. Campbell (R)

==== Rhode Island ====
▌1. Clark Burdick (R)
▌2. Richard S. Aldrich (R)
▌3. Jeremiah E. O'Connell (D)

==== South Carolina ====
▌1. W. Turner Logan (D)
▌2. James F. Byrnes (D)
▌3. Fred H. Dominick (D)
▌4. John J. McSwain (D)
▌5. William F. Stevenson (D)
▌6. Allard H. Gasque (D)
▌7. Hampton P. Fulmer (D)

==== South Dakota ====
▌1. Charles A. Christopherson (R)
▌2. Royal C. Johnson (R)
▌3. William Williamson (R)

==== Tennessee ====
▌1. B. Carroll Reece (R)
▌2. J. Will Taylor (R)
▌3. Samuel D. McReynolds (D)
▌4. Cordell Hull (D)
▌5. Ewin L. Davis (D)
▌6. Joseph W. Byrns (D)
▌7. William C. Salmon (D)
▌8. Gordon Browning (D)
▌9. Finis J. Garrett (D)
▌10. Hubert Fisher (D)

==== Texas ====
▌1. Eugene Black (D)
▌2. John C. Box (D)
▌3. Morgan G. Sanders (D)
▌4. Sam Rayburn (D)
▌5. Hatton W. Sumners (D)
▌6. Luther Alexander Johnson (D)
▌7. Clay Stone Briggs (D)
▌8. Daniel E. Garrett (D)
▌9. Joseph J. Mansfield (D)
▌10. James P. Buchanan (D)
▌11. Tom T. Connally (D)
▌12. Fritz G. Lanham (D)
▌13. Guinn Williams (D)
▌14. Harry M. Wurzbach (R)
▌15. John Nance Garner (D)
▌16. Claude B. Hudspeth (D)
▌17. Thomas L. Blanton (D)
▌18. John Marvin Jones (D)

==== Utah ====
▌1. Don B. Colton (R)
▌2. Elmer O. Leatherwood (R)

==== Vermont ====
▌1. Frederick G. Fleetwood (R)
▌2. Porter H. Dale (R), until August 11, 1923

▌Ernest Willard Gibson (R), from November 6, 1923

==== Virginia ====
▌1. S. Otis Bland (D)
▌2. Joseph T. Deal (D)
▌3. Andrew Jackson Montague (D)
▌4. Patrick H. Drewry (D)
▌5. James M. Hooker (D)
▌6. Clifton A. Woodrum (D)
▌7. Thomas W. Harrison (D)
▌8. R. Walton Moore (D)
▌9. George C. Peery (D)
▌10. Henry St. George Tucker III (D)

==== Washington ====
▌1. John F. Miller (R)
▌2. Lindley H. Hadley (R)
▌3. Albert Johnson (R)
▌4. John W. Summers (R)
▌5. J. Stanley Webster (R), until May 8, 1923

▌Samuel B. Hill (D), from September 25, 1923

==== West Virginia ====
▌1. Benjamin L. Rosenbloom (R)
▌2. Robert E. L. Allen (D)
▌3. Stuart F. Reed (R)
▌4. George W. Johnson (D)
▌5. Thomas J. Lilly (D)
▌6. J. Alfred Taylor (D)

==== Wisconsin ====
▌1. Henry Allen Cooper (R)
▌2. Edward Voigt (R)
▌3. John M. Nelson (R)
▌4. John C. Schafer (R)
▌5. Victor L. Berger (Soc.)
▌6. Florian Lampert (R)
▌7. Joseph D. Beck (R)
▌8. Edward E. Browne (R)
▌9. George J. Schneider (R)
▌10. James A. Frear (R)
▌11. Hubert H. Peavey (R)

==== Wyoming ====
▌At-large. Charles E. Winter (R)

==== Non-voting members ====
▌Alaska Territory. Daniel Sutherland (R)
▌Hawaii Territory. William P. Jarrett (D)
▌Philippines. Isauro Gabaldón (Nac.)
▌Philippines. Pedro Guevara (Nac.)
▌Puerto Rico. Félix Córdova Dávila

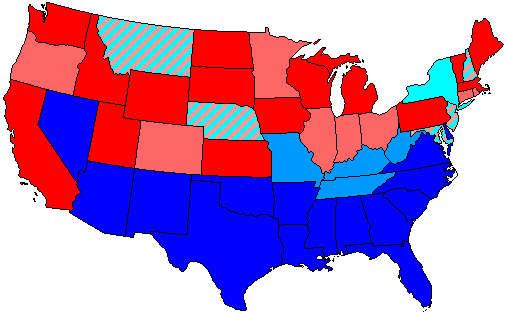
House seats by party holding plurality in state: 80+% to 100% Democratic / 80+% to 100% Republican; 60+% to 80% Democratic / 60+% to 80% Republican; Up to 60% Democratic / Up to 60% Republican

House majority leadership

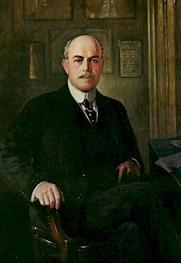
Nicholas Longworth
Republican leader

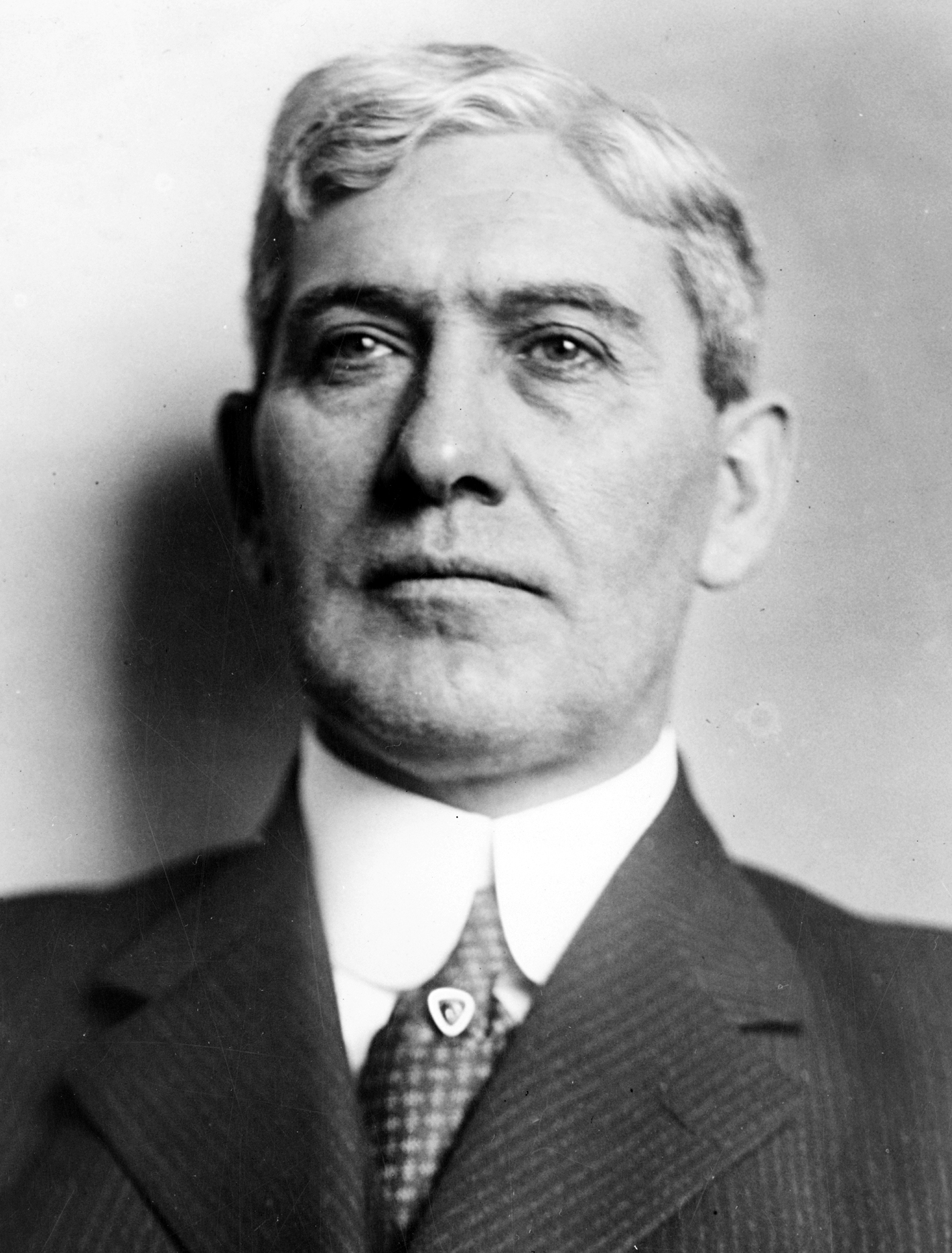
Albert H. Vestal
Republican whip

House minority leadership

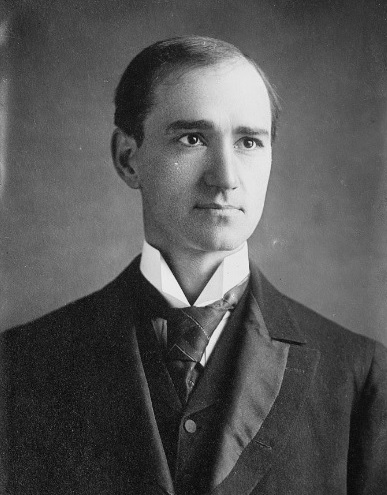
Finis J. Garrett
Democratic leader

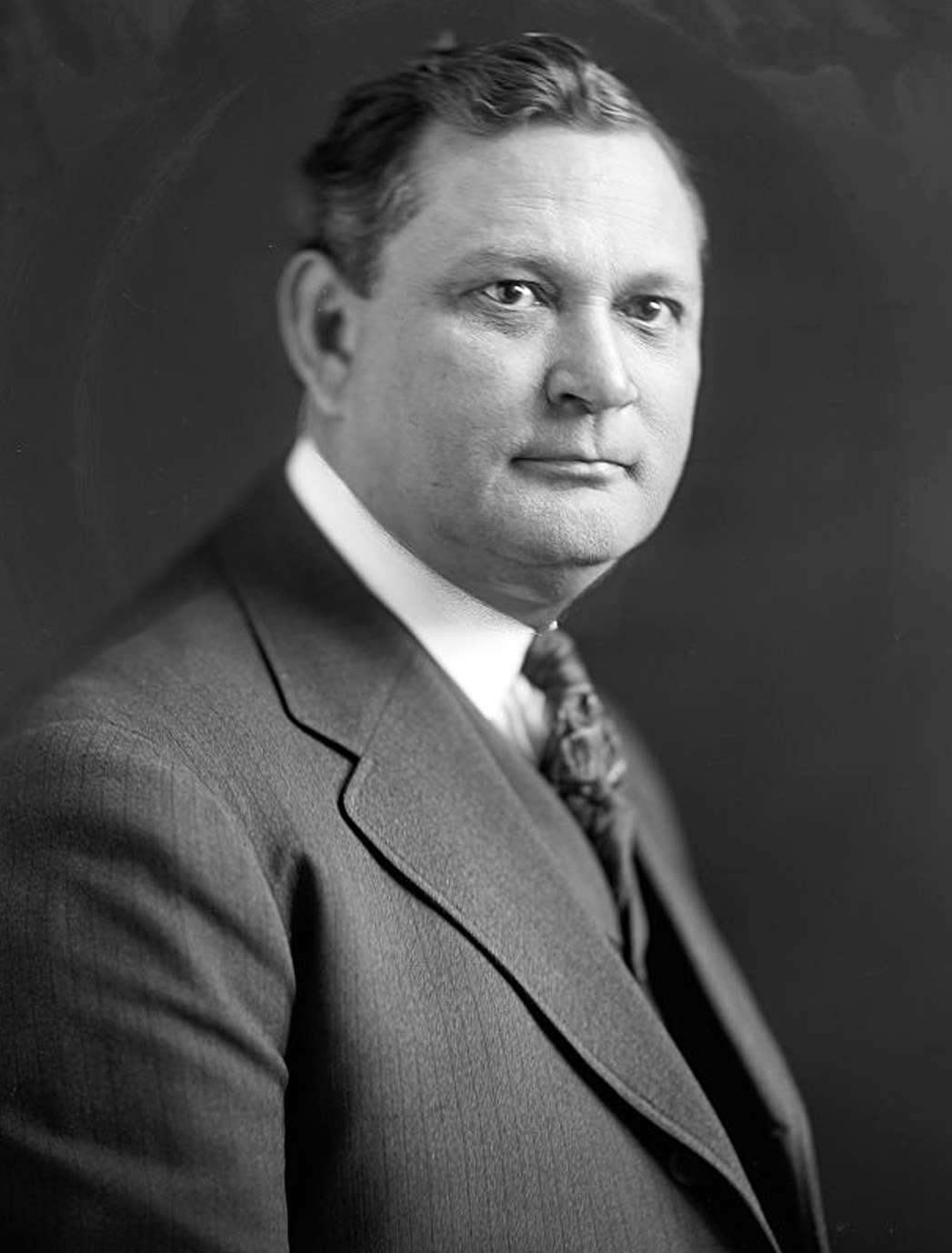
William Allan Oldfield
Democratic whip

== Changes in membership ==
The count below reflects changes from the beginning of the first session of this Congress.

=== Senate ===
- Replacements: 8
  - Democratic: no net change
  - Republican: 1 seat net loss
  - Farmer–Labor: 1 seat net gain
- Deaths: 7
- Resignations: 0
- Vacancy: 0
- Total seats with changes: 7

State	Senator	Reason for vacancy	Successor	Date of successor's installation
Colorado (3)	Samuel D. Nicholson (R)	Died March 24, 1923. Successor was appointed.	Alva B. Adams (D)	May 17, 1923
Minnesota (2)	Knute Nelson (R)	Died April 28, 1923. Successor was elected.	Magnus Johnson (FL)	July 16, 1923
Vermont (3)	William P. Dillingham (R)	Died July 12, 1923. Successor was elected.	Porter H. Dale (R)	November 7, 1923
Rhode Island (2)	LeBaron Bradford Colt (R)	Died August 18, 1924. Successor was elected.	Jesse H. Metcalf (R)	November 5, 1924
Connecticut (3)	Frank B. Brandegee (R)	Died October 14, 1924. Successor was elected December 17, 1924.	Hiram Bingham III (R)	January 8, 1925
Massachusetts (1)	Henry Cabot Lodge (R)	Died November 9, 1924. Successor was appointed.	William M. Butler (R)	November 13, 1924
Colorado (3)	Alva B. Adams (D)	Interim appointee retired. Successor was elected November 4, 1924.	Rice W. Means (R)	December 1, 1924
Illinois (2)	Joseph M. McCormick (R)	Died February 25, 1925. Successor was appointed, having already been elected to the next term.	Charles S. Deneen (R)	February 26, 1925

=== House of Representatives ===
- Replacements: 22
  - Democratic: 1 seat net gain
  - Republican: 1 seat net loss
- Deaths: 15
- Resignations: 6
- Contested election: 0
- Total seats with changes: 24

District	Vacated by	Reason for vacancy	Successor	Date of successor's installation
Illinois 2nd	Vacant	Rep. James R. Mann died during previous congress	Morton D. Hull (R)	April 3, 1923
California 10th	Vacant	Rep. Henry Z. Osborne died during previous congress	John D. Fredericks (R)	May 1, 1923
New York 16th	Vacant	Rep. William Bourke Cockran died during previous congress	John J. O'Connor (D)	November 6, 1923
Alabama 2nd	John R. Tyson (D)	Died March 27, 1923	Lister Hill (D)	August 14, 1923
Michigan 3rd	John M. C. Smith (R)	Died March 30, 1923	Arthur B. Williams (R)	June 19, 1923
Iowa 8th	Horace M. Towner (R)	Resigned April 1, 1923, after being appointed Governor of Puerto Rico	Hiram K. Evans (R)	June 4, 1923
New York 11th	Daniel J. Riordan (D)	Died April 28, 1923	Anning S. Prall (D)	November 6, 1923
Illinois 4th	John W. Rainey (D)	Died May 4, 1923	Thomas A. Doyle (D)	November 6, 1923
Arkansas 6th	Lewis E. Sawyer (D)	Died May 5, 1923	James B. Reed (D)	October 6, 1923
Washington 5th	J. Stanley Webster (R)	Resigned May 8, 1923, after being appointed to United States District Court for the Eastern District of Washington	Samuel B. Hill (D)	September 25, 1923
North Carolina 2nd	Claude Kitchin (D)	Died May 31, 1923	John H. Kerr (D)	November 6, 1923
New York 32nd	Luther W. Mott (R)	Died July 10, 1923	Thaddeus C. Sweet (R)	November 6, 1923
Vermont 2nd	Porter H. Dale (R)	Resigned August 11, 1923, after becoming a candidate for the United States Senate	Ernest Willard Gibson (R)	November 6, 1923
Kentucky 7th	J. Campbell Cantrill (D)	Died September 2, 1923	Joseph W. Morris (D)	November 30, 1923
New York 24th	James V. Ganly (D)	Died September 7, 1923	Benjamin L. Fairchild (R)	November 6, 1923
Mississippi 3rd	Benjamin G. Humphreys II (D)	Died October 16, 1923	William Y. Humphreys (D)	November 27, 1923
Kentucky 9th	William J. Fields (D)	Resigned December 11, 1923	Fred M. Vinson (D)	January 24, 1924
Louisiana 2nd	H. Garland Dupré (D)	Died February 21, 1924	James Z. Spearing (D)	April 22, 1924
Illinois 14th	William J. Graham (R)	Resigned June 7, 1924, after being appointed to the United States Court of Customs Appeals	Seat remained vacant until next Congress	
Kansas 2nd	Edward C. Little (R)	Died June 27, 1924	Ulysses S. Guyer (R)	November 4, 1924
North Dakota 2nd	George M. Young (R)	Resigned September 2, 1924, after being appointed to the Board of General Appraisers	Thomas Hall (R)	November 4, 1924
Massachusetts 15th	William S. Greene (R)	Died September 22, 1924	Robert M. Leach (R)	November 4, 1924
Maryland 5th	Sydney E. Mudd II (R)	Died October 11, 1924	Stephen W. Gambrill (D)	November 4, 1924
California 4th	Julius Kahn (R)	Died December 18, 1924	Seat remained vacant until next Congress	

== Committees ==
Lists of committees and their party leaders for members of the House and Senate committees can be found through the Official Congressional Directory at the bottom of this article. The directory after the pages of terms of service lists committees of the Senate, House (Standing with Subcommittees, Select and Special) and Joint and, after that, House/Senate committee assignments. On the committees section of the House and Senate in the Official Congressional Directory, the committee's members on the first row on the left side shows the chairman of the committee and on the right side shows the ranking member of the committee.

=== Senate ===
- Agriculture and Forestry (Chairman: George W. Norris; Ranking Member: Ellison D. Smith)
- Alien Property Custodian's Office (Select)
- Appropriations (Chairman: Francis E. Warren; Ranking Member: Lee S. Overman)
- Audit and Control the Contingent Expenses of the Senate (Chairman: Henry W. Keyes; Ranking Member: Kenneth McKellar)
- Banking and Currency (Chairman: George P. McLean; Ranking Member: Duncan U. Fletcher)
- Civil Service (Chairman: James Couzens then Porter H. Dale; Ranking Member: Kenneth McKellar)
- Claims (Chairman: Rice W. Means; Ranking Member: Park Trammell)
- Commerce (Chairman: Wesley L. Jones; Ranking Member: Duncan U. Fletcher)
- District of Columbia (Chairman: Arthur Capper; Ranking Member: William H. King)
- Education and Labor (Chairman: Lawrence C. Phipps; Ranking Member: Andrieus A. Jones)
- Enrolled Bills (Chairman: Frank L. Greene; Ranking Member: Coleman L. Blease)
- Expenditures in Executive Departments (Chairman: David A. Reed; Ranking Member: Oscar W. Underwood)
- Finance (Chairman: Reed Smoot; Ranking Member: Furnifold M. Simmons)
- Foreign Relations (Chairman: William E. Borah; Ranking Member: Claude Swanson)
- Immigration (Chairman: Hiram W. Johnson; Ranking Member: William H. King)
- Indian Affairs (Chairman: John W. Harreld; Ranking Member: Henry F. Ashurst)
- Internal Revenue Bureau (Select)
- Interoceanic Canals (Chairman: Walter Evans Edge; Ranking Member: Thomas J. Walsh)
- Interstate Commerce (Chairman: James Eli Watson; Ranking Member: Ellison D. Smith)
- Irrigation and Reclamation (Chairman: Charles L. McNary; Ranking Member: Morris Sheppard)
- Judiciary (Chairman: Albert B. Cummins; Ranking Member: Lee S. Overman)
- Library (Chairman: Simeon D. Fess; Ranking Member: Kenneth McKellar)
- Manufactures (Chairman: William B. McKinley; Ranking Member: Ellison D. Smith)
- Military Affairs (Chairman: James W. Wadsworth Jr.; Ranking Member: Duncan U. Fletcher)
- Mines and Mining (Chairman: Tasker L. Oddie; Ranking Member: Thomas J. Walsh)
- Naval Affairs (Chairman: Frederick Hale; Ranking Member: Claude A. Swanson)
- Patents (Chairman: William M. Butler; Ranking Member: Ellison D. Smith)
- Pensions (Chairman: Peter Norbeck; Ranking Member: Peter G. Gerry)
- Post Office and Post Roads (Chairman: George H. Moses; Ranking Member: Kenneth McKellar)
- Printing (Chairman: George W. Pepper; Ranking Member: Duncan U. Fletcher)
- Privileges and Elections (Chairman: Richard P. Ernst; Ranking Member: William H. King)
- Public Buildings and Grounds (Chairman: Bert M. Fernald; Ranking Member: James A. Reed)
- Public Lands and Surveys (Chairman: Robert Nelson Stanfield; Ranking Member: Key Pittman)
- Rules (Chairman: Charles Curtis; Ranking Member: Lee S. Overman)
- Senatorial Elections (Select)
- Tariff Commission (Select)
- Territories and Insular Possessions (Chairman: Frank B. Willis; Ranking Member: Key Pittman)
- War Finance Corporation Loans (Select)
- Whole

=== House of Representatives ===
- Accounts (Chairman: Clarence MacGregor; Ranking Member: Ralph Waldo Emerson Gilbert)
- Agriculture (Chairman: Gilbert N. Haugen; Ranking Member: James B. Aswell)
- Alcoholic Liquor Traffic (Chairman: Grant M. Hudson; Ranking Member: William D. Upshaw)
- Appropriations (Chairman: Martin B. Madden; Ranking Member: Joseph W. Byrns)
- Banking and Currency (Chairman: Louis T. McFadden; Ranking Member: Otis Wingo)
- Census (Chairman: E. Hart Fenn; Ranking Member: John E. Rankin)
- Civil Service (Chairman: Frederick R. Lehlbach; Ranking Member: Lamar Jeffers)
- Claims (Chairman: Charles L. Underhill; Ranking Member: John C. Box)
- Coinage, Weights and Measures (Chairman: Randolph Perkins; Ranking Member: Bill G. Lowrey)
- Disposition of Executive Papers (Chairman: Edward H. Wason; Ranking Member: Arthur B. Rouse)
- District of Columbia (Chairman: Frederick N. Zihlman; Ranking Member: Christopher D. Sullivan)
- Education (Chairman: Daniel A. Reed; Ranking Member: Bill G. Lowrey)
- Election of the President, Vice President and Representatives in Congress (Chairman: Hays B. White; Ranking Member: Lamar Jeffers)
- Elections No.#1 (Chairman: Don B. Colton; Ranking Member: C.B. Hudspeth)
- Elections No.#2 (Chairman: Bird J. Vincent; Ranking Member: Gordon Browning)
- Elections No.#3 (Chairman: Charles L. Gifford; Ranking Member: Guinn Williams)
- Enrolled Bills (Chairman: Guy E. Campbell; Ranking Member: Thomas L. Blanton)
- Expenditures in the Agriculture Department (Chairman: Edward J. King; Ranking Member: Frank Gardner)
- Expenditures in the Commerce Department (Chairman: Henry R. Rathbone; Ranking Member: Miles C. Allgood)
- Expenditures in the Interior Department (Chairman: William Williamson; Ranking Member: Sol Bloom)
- Expenditures in the Justice Department (Chairman: Willis G. Sears; Ranking Member: Frank Oliver)
- Expenditures in the Labor Department (Chairman: Carroll L. Beedy; Ranking Member: Thomas L. Blanton)
- Expenditures in the Navy Department (Chairman: George F. Brumm; Ranking Member: Charles L. Abernethy)
- Expenditures in the Post Office Department (Chairman: Philip D. Swing; Ranking Member: Guinn Williams)
- Expenditures in the State Department (Chairman: J. Will Taylor; Ranking Member: George C. Peery)
- Expenditures in the Treasury Department (Chairman: Ernest W. Gibson; Ranking Member: Heartsill Ragon)
- Expenditures in the War Department (Chairman: Thaddeus C. Sweet; Ranking Member: Arthur H. Greenwood)
- Expenditures on Public Buildings (Chairman: Elmer O. Leatherwood; Ranking Member: Samuel Dickstein)
- Flood Control (Chairman: Frank R. Reid; Ranking Member: Riley J. Wilson)
- Foreign Affairs (Chairman: Stephen G. Porter; Ranking Member: J. Charles Linthicum)
- Immigration and Naturalization (Chairman: Albert Johnson; Ranking Member: Adolph J. Sabath)
- Indian Affairs (Chairman: John W. Harreld; Ranking Member: Carl Hayden)
- Industrial Arts and Expositions (Chairman: George A. Welsh; Ranking Member: Fritz G. Lanham)
- Inquiry into Operation of the United States Air Services (Select) (Chairman: N/A)
- Insular Affairs (Chairman: Scott Leavitt; Ranking Member: Mell G. Underwood)
- Interstate and Foreign Commerce (Chairman: James S. Parker; Ranking Member: Alben W. Barkley)
- Invalid Pensions (Chairman: Charles E. Fuller; Ranking Member: Mell G. Underwood)
- Irrigation and Reclamation (Chairman: Addison T. Smith; Ranking Member: Carl Hayden)
- Judiciary (Chairman: George S. Graham; Ranking Member: Hatton W. Sumners)
- Labor (Chairman: William F. Kopp; Ranking Member: William D. Upshaw)
- Library (Chairman: Robert Luce; Ranking Member: Ralph Waldo Emerson Gilbert)
- Merchant Marine and Fisheries (Chairman: Frank D. Scott; Ranking Member: Ladislas Lazaro)
- Mileage (Chairman: Carroll L. Beedy; Ranking Member: John W. Moore)
- Military Affairs (Chairman: John M. Morin; Ranking Member: Percy E. Quin)
- Mines and Mining (Chairman: John M. Robsion; Ranking Member: Daniel Sutherland)
- Naval Affairs (Chairman: Thomas S. Butler; Ranking Member: Carl Vinson)
- Patents (Chairman: Albert H. Vestal; Ranking Member: Fritz G. Lanham)
- Pensions (Chairman: Harold Knutson; Ranking Member: William D. Upshaw)
- Post Office and Post Roads (Chairman: William W. Griest; Ranking Member: Thomas M. Bell)
- Printing (Chairman: Edward M. Beers; Ranking Member: William F. Stevenson)
- Public Buildings and Grounds (Chairman: Richard N. Elliott; Ranking Member: Fritz G. Lanham)
- Public Lands (Chairman: Nicholas J. Sinnott; Ranking Member: John E. Raker then John M. Evans)
- Railways and Canals (Chairman: Oscar E. Keller; Ranking Member: William C. Lankford)
- Revision of Laws (Chairman: Roy G. Fitzgerald; Ranking Member: Alfred L. Bulwinkle)
- Rivers and Harbors (Chairman: S. Wallace Dempsey; Ranking Member: Joseph J. Mansfield)
- Roads (Chairman: Cassius C. Dowell; Ranking Member: Edward B. Almon)
- Rules (Chairman: Bertrand H. Snell; Ranking Member: Edward W. Pou)
- Standards of Official Conduct
- Territories (Chairman: Charles F. Curry; Ranking Member: William C. Lankford)
- War Claims (Chairman: James G. Strong; Ranking Member: Bill G. Lowrey)
- Ways and Means (Chairman: William R. Green; Ranking Member: John N. Garner)
- Woman Suffrage (Chairman: Wallace H. White Jr.; Ranking Member: John E. Raker then Christopher D. Sullivan)
- World War Veterans' Legislation (Chairman: Royal C. Johnson; Ranking Member: Carl Hayden)
- Whole

=== Joint committees ===
- Civil Service Retirement Act
- Conditions of Indian Tribes (Special)
- Disposition of (Useless) Executive Papers
- Determine what Employment may be Furnished Federal Prisoners (Chairman: Rep. George S. Graham)
- Investigation of Northern Pacific Railroad Land Grants (Chairman: Rep. Nicholas J. Sinnott)
- Muscle Shoals
- The Library (Chairman: Sen. Simeon D. Fess)
- Printing (Chairman: Sen. George H. Moses; Vice Chairman: Rep. Edgar R. Kiess)
- Taxation (Chairman: Rep. William R. Green)

== Caucuses ==
- Democratic (House)
- Democratic (Senate)

== Employees ==
=== Legislative branch agency directors ===
- Architect of the Capitol: Elliott Woods, until May 22, 1923
  - David Lynn, from August 22, 1923
- Comptroller General of the United States: John R. McCarl
- Librarian of Congress: Herbert Putnam
- Public Printer of the United States: George H. Carter

=== Senate ===
- Chaplain: John J. Muir Baptist
- Secretary: George A. Sanderson
- Librarian: Edward C. Goodwin
- Sergeant at Arms: David S. Barry

=== House of Representatives ===
- Chaplain: James S. Montgomery Methodist
- Clerk: William T. Page
- Doorkeeper: Bert W. Kennedy
- Clerk at the Speaker's Table: Lehr Fess
- Reading Clerks: Patrick Joseph Haltigan (D) and Alney E. Chaffee (R)
- Postmaster: Frank W. Collier
- Sergeant at Arms: Joseph G. Rodgers

== See also ==
- 1922 United States elections (elections leading to this Congress)
  - 1922 United States Senate elections
  - 1923 United States Senate elections
  - 1922 United States House of Representatives elections
- 1924 United States elections (elections during this Congress, leading to the next Congress)
  - 1924 United States presidential election
  - 1924 United States Senate elections
  - 1924 United States House of Representatives elections
