= Arkansas's 6th congressional district =

Former congressional district

- Obsolete district
- Created: 1890
- Eliminated: 1960
- Years active: 1893-1963

Arkansas's 6th congressional district was a congressional district for the United States House of Representatives in Arkansas from 1893 to 1963. Except for vacancies, the seat was always held by white Democrats.

== List of members representing the district ==
Member	Party	Years	Cong ress	Electoral history
District created March 4, 1893
Robert Neill (Batesville)	Democratic	March 4, 1893 – March 3, 1897	53rd 54th	Elected in 1892. Re-elected in 1894. Lost renomination.
Stephen Brundidge Jr. (Searcy)	Democratic	March 4, 1897 – March 3, 1903	55th 56th 57th	Elected in 1896. Re-elected in 1898. Re-elected in 1900. Redistricted to the 2nd district.
Joseph T. Robinson (Lonoke)	Democratic	March 4, 1903 – January 14, 1913	58th 59th 60th 61st 62nd	Elected in 1902. Re-elected in 1904. Re-elected in 1906. Re-elected in 1908. Re-elected in 1910. Retired to run for Governor of Arkansas. Resigned when elected.
Vacant		January 14, 1913 – January 15, 1913	62nd	
Samuel M. Taylor (Pine Bluff)	Democratic	January 15, 1913 – September 13, 1921	62nd 63rd 64th 65th 66th 67th	Elected to finish Robinson's term, having already been elected to the next term. Elected in 1912. Re-elected in 1914. Re-elected in 1916. Re-elected in 1918. Re-elected in 1920. Died.
Vacant		September 13, 1921 – October 25, 1921	67th	
Chester W. Taylor (Pine Bluff)	Democratic	October 25, 1921 – March 3, 1923	67th	Elected to finish Taylor's term. Retired.
Lewis E. Sawyer (Hot Springs)	Democratic	March 4, 1923 – May 5, 1923	68th	Elected in 1922. Died.
Vacant		May 5, 1923 – October 6, 1923	68th	
James B. Reed (Lonoke)	Democratic	October 6, 1923 – March 3, 1929	68th 69th 70th	Elected to finish Sawyer's term. Re-elected in 1924. Re-elected in 1926. Lost renomination.
David D. Glover (Malvern)	Democratic	March 4, 1929 – January 3, 1935	71st 72nd 73rd	Elected in 1928. Re-elected in 1930. Re-elected in 1932. Lost renomination.
John L. McClellan (Malvern)	Democratic	January 3, 1935 – January 3, 1939	74th 75th	Elected in 1934. Re-elected in 1936. Retired to run for U.S. Senator.
William F. Norrell (Monticello)	Democratic	January 3, 1939 – February 15, 1961	76th 77th 78th 79th 80th 81st 82nd 83rd 84th 85th 86th 87th	Elected in 1938. Re-elected in 1940. Re-elected in 1942. Re-elected in 1944. Re-elected in 1946. Re-elected in 1948. Re-elected in 1950. Re-elected in 1952. Re-elected in 1954. Re-elected in 1956. Re-elected in 1958. Re-elected in 1960. Died.
Vacant		February 15, 1961 – April 18, 1961	87th	
Catherine D. Norrell (Monticello)	Democratic	April 18, 1961 – January 3, 1963	87th	Elected to finish her husband's term. Retired.
District eliminated January 3, 1963
