= Sheridan School District (Arkansas) =

School district in Arkansas

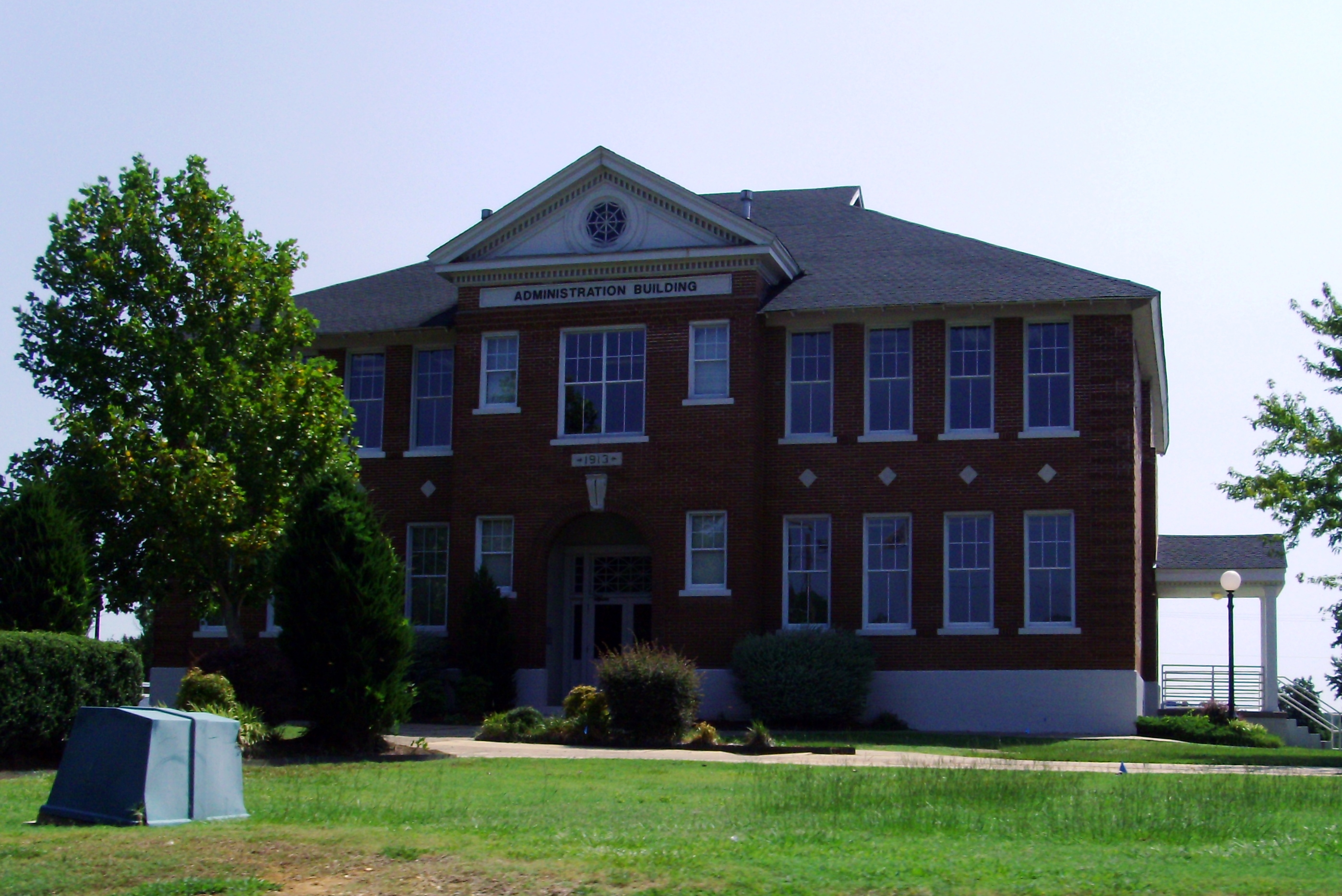
- Main façade of the Administration Building

Address
- 400 North Rock Street Sheridan, Arkansas, 72150; United States

District information
- Type: Public
- Motto: Inspire. Empower. Serve.
- Grades: K through 12
- Superintendent: Dr. Karla Neathery
- Governing agency: Arkansas Department of Education
- Schools: 7
- NCES District ID: 0500015

Students and staff
- Students: 4,253
- Teachers: 271.61 (on FTE)
- Student–teacher ratio: 15.66

Other information
- Website: sheridanschools.org

Sheridan School District is a public school district headquartered in Sheridan, Arkansas, United States. The district serves areas of Grant County, including Sheridan, and Saline County, including the unincorporated area of East End.

== History ==
The Grapevine School District merged into the Sheridan district on July 1, 1985. The Leola School District merged into the Sheridan one on July 1, 1987. The Prattsville School District merged into the Sheridan district on July 1, 1994.

== Schools ==
Secondary schools

- Sheridan High School (Sheridan): Grades 9-12
- Junior High/Middle School

Grades 6-8

  - Sheridan Middle School (Sheridan)
  - East End Middle School (unincorporated Saline County)

Primary schools

- Intermediate schools (Grades 3–5)
  - East End Intermediate School (unincorporated Saline County)
  - Sheridan Intermediate School (Sheridan)
- Elementary schools: (Grades K-2)
  - East End Elementary School (unincorporated Saline County)
  - Sheridan Elementary School (Sheridan)
