= Robert Neill (American politician) =

American politician

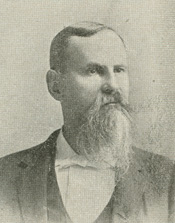

Member of the U.S. House of Representatives from Arkansas's 6th district
- In office March 4, 1893 – March 3, 1897
- Succeeded by: Stephen Brundidge, Jr.

Personal details
- Born: November 12, 1838 Desha, Arkansas, US
- Died: February 16, 1907 (aged 68) Batesville, Arkansas, US
- Resting place: Oaklawn Cemetery, Batesville, Arkansas
- Party: Democratic

Military service
- Allegiance: Confederate States of America
- Branch/service: Confederate States Army
- Years of service: 1861 – 1865
- Rank: Captain
- Battles/wars: American Civil War

Robert Neill (November 12, 1838 – February 16, 1907) was a U.S. representative from Arkansas.

== Life ==
Born near Desha, Arkansas, Neill attended the common schools. He took a course in land surveying under a tutor in Ohio in 1859.

Neill was elected county surveyor of his native county in August 1860. He entered the Confederate States Army in May 1861 and served as a private in Company K, First Regiment, Arkansas Mounted Riflemen, Gen. Benjamin McCulloch's Brigade, Army of the West. In August 1861 he was severely wounded at the Battle of Wilson’s Creek. He was promoted to first lieutenant in 1862 and to captain in 1863. He served as clerk of the circuit court of Independence County 1866-1868.

He read law and was admitted to the bar in 1868 and commenced practice in Batesville in 1872. He served as lieutenant colonel of Arkansas State Guards 1874-1877.

He served as a brigadier general of State militia 1877-1882. He served as delegate to the Democratic National Convention in 1888 and vice president of the convention for Arkansas.

Neill was elected as a Democrat to the Fifty-third and Fifty-fourth Congresses (March 4, 1893 – March 3, 1897). He was an unsuccessful candidate for renomination in 1896. He resumed the practice of law. He served one year as chairman of the Arkansas Railroad Commission, having been appointed in 1899 by Governor Jones. He died in Batesville, Arkansas, February 16, 1907.

== Notes ==
U.S. House of Representatives
Preceded by District created	Member of the U.S. House of Representatives from Arkansas's 6th congressional district March 4, 1893 – March 3, 1897	Succeeded by Stephen Brundidge, Jr.
