= Chester W. Taylor =

American politician (1883–1931)

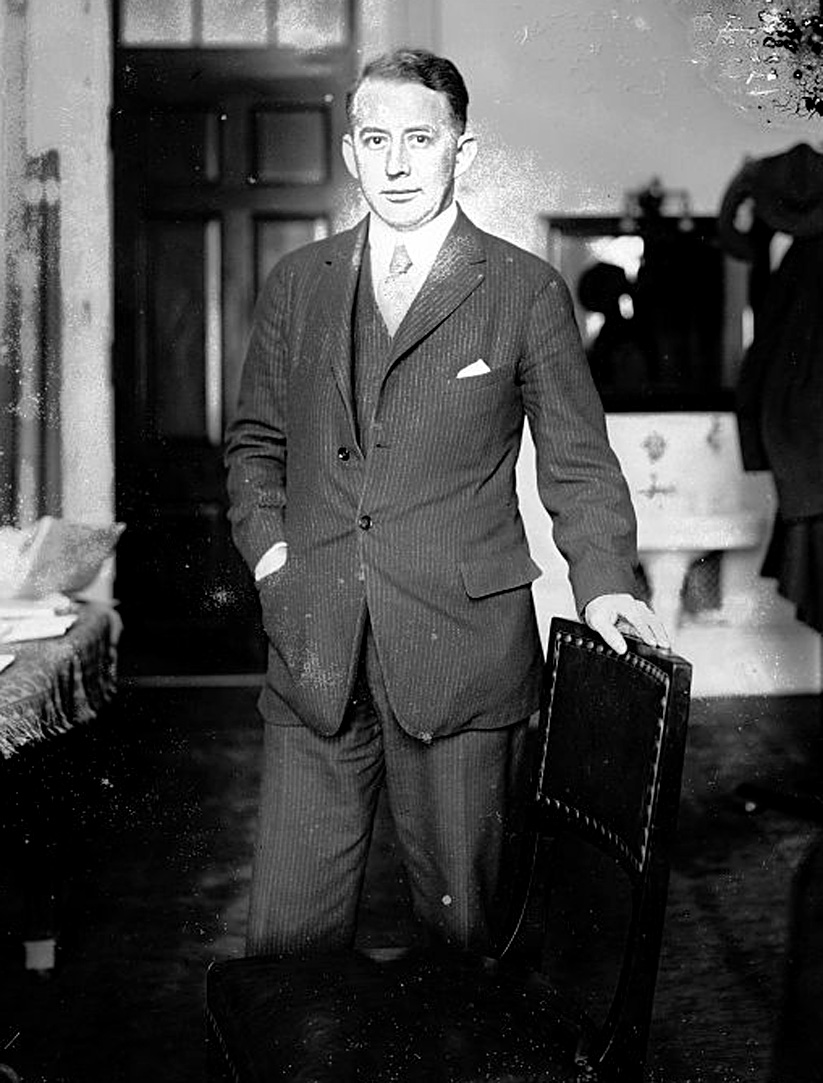
- Official portrait, 1921

Member of the U.S. House of Representatives from Arkansas's 6th district
- In office October 25, 1921 – March 3, 1923
- Preceded by: Samuel M. Taylor
- Succeeded by: Lewis E. Sawyer

Personal details
- Born: July 16, 1883 Verona, Mississippi, US
- Died: July 17, 1931 (aged 48) Pine Bluff, Arkansas, US
- Party: Democratic
- Parent: Samuel Mitchell Taylor (father)
- Education: Georgetown University Law Center

Chester William Taylor (July 16, 1883 – July 17, 1931) was a U.S. representative from Arkansas.

== Biography ==
Taylor was born in Verona, Mississippi, but moved to Pine Bluff, Arkansas, with his parents in 1887. He attended the public schools in Pine Bluff, Arkansas, and studied law at Georgetown University Law Center in Washington, D.C.

Taylor served one term as Deputy State Auditor from 1908 to 1910. He was appointed Deputy Secretary of State in 1911 and later served as Deputy State Treasurer from 1911 to 1912, holding both positions under Governor George Washington Donaghey. Later, Taylor acted as secretary to his father, Congressman Samuel M. Taylor from 1913 to 1921.

Taylor was elected as a Democrat to the Sixty-seventh Congress to fill the vacancy caused by the death of his father, serving from October 25, 1921 to March 4, 1923. He was not a candidate for renomination to the Sixty-eighth Congress in 1922.

He engaged in the general insurance business at Pine Bluff, Arkansas, and later as an official in the State Department of conservation at Little Rock, Arkansas. Taylor died in 1931 in Pine Bluff, Arkansas, and was interred in Bellewood Cemetery.

His son, Chester Jr., was superintendent of the Pasco County Schools in Florida.

U.S. House of Representatives
Preceded by Samuel M. Taylor	Member of the U.S. House of Representatives from Arkansas's 6th congressional district October 25, 1921 – March 3, 1923	Succeeded by Lewis E. Sawyer
