= Stephen Brundidge Jr. =

American politician

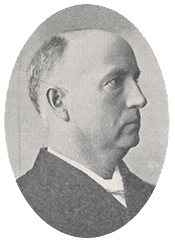

Member of the U.S. House of Representatives from Arkansas
- In office March 4, 1897 – March 3, 1909
- Preceded by: Robert Neill
- Succeeded by: William A. Oldfield
- Constituency: 6th district (1897–1903); 2nd district (1903–1909)

Personal details
- Born: January 1, 1857 Searcy, Arkansas, U.S.
- Died: January 14, 1938 (aged 81) Searcy, Arkansas, U.S.
- Resting place: Oak Grove Cemetery in Searcy
- Party: Democratic
- Spouse: Nellie Margurite Morris Brundidge
- Profession: Attorney; politician

Stephen Brundidge Jr. (January 1, 1857 – January 14, 1938) was an American lawyer and politician who served six terms as and a U.S. Representative from Arkansas from 1897 to 1909.

== Early life and career ==
Born in Searcy, Arkansas, Brundidge was the son of Stephen and Minerva Brundidge. He was educated by private tutors and in the public schools in his native city. He studied law in the offices of William R. Coody and Dandridge McRae, and was admitted to the bar in 1879. In 1881, he married Nellie Margurite Morris of Jacksonport. They had four children, two of whom survived to adulthood.

Brundidge commenced practice in Newport, Arkansas, then returned to Searcy, Arkansas, in 1880 and continued the practice of law.

== Political career ==
He was elected prosecuting attorney of the first judicial district of Arkansas in 1886, and was reelected in 1888. He served until 1890 and then resumed the practice of law. He also served as member of the Democratic State central committee from 1890 to 1892.

=== Congress ===
Elected as a Democrat to the Fifty-fifth and to the five succeeding Congresses, Brundidge served from March 4, 1897 to March 3, 1909. He was not a candidate for renomination in 1908, but was an unsuccessful candidate for Governor that year, then resumed the practice of law in Searcy, Arkansas.

He was an unsuccessful candidate for election to the United States Senate in 1918.

== Death ==
Brundidge died in Searcy, White County, Arkansas, January 14, 1938 (age 81 years, 13 days). He is interred at Oak Grove Cemetery, Searcy, Arkansas.

U.S. House of Representatives
Preceded by Robert Neill	Member of the U.S. House of Representatives from Arkansas's 6th congressional district March 4, 1897 – March 3, 1903	Succeeded by Joseph T. Robinson
Preceded by John S. Little	Member of the U.S. House of Representatives from Arkansas's 2nd congressional district March 4, 1903 – March 3, 1909	Succeeded by William A. Oldfield
