= D. D. Glover =

American politician (1868-1952)

David Delano Glover

Member of the U.S. House of Representatives from Arkansas's 6th district
- In office March 4, 1929 – January 3, 1935
- Preceded by: James B. Reed
- Succeeded by: John L. McClellan

Member of the Arkansas House of Representatives
- In office 1909; 1911

Personal details
- Born: January 18, 1868 Prattsville, Grant County; Arkansas, USA
- Died: April 5, 1952 (aged 84) Malvern, Hot Spring County; Arkansas
- Resting place: Shadowlawn Cemetery in Malvern, Arkansas
- Party: Democratic
- Relations: Robert W. Glover
- Education: Sheridan High School
- Occupation: Educator; Attorney

David Delano Glover (January 18, 1868 – April 5, 1952) was a U.S. representative from Arkansas's 6th congressional district, which was abolished through reapportionment in 1963. Glover served in congress from 1929 to 1935.

== Life and work ==
Born in Prattsville in Grant County, Glover attended the public schools of Prattsville and Sheridan, the seat of Grant County. He was graduated in 1886 from Sheridan High School. He engaged in agricultural pursuits and in the mercantile business. He taught in the public schools of Hot Spring County from 1898 to 1908 and then studied law. He was admitted to the bar in 1910 and commenced practice in Malvern, the seat of government of Hot Spring County.

Glover served as member of the Arkansas House of Representatives in the regular legislative sessions of 1909 and 1911. He served as delegate to several state conventions and a prosecuting attorney of the Seventh Judicial Circuit Court of Arkansas from 1913 to 1917.

Glover was elected as a Democrat to the Seventy-first, Seventy-second, and Seventy-third Congresses (March 4, 1929 – January 3, 1935). Glover unseated James B. Reed in the 1928 Democratic primary. Six years later, Glover himself was denied renomination by the attorney John L. McClellan, then of Camden and formally of Sheridan, Arkansas, and later a U.S. senator. After his congressional tenure, Glover resumed the practice of law in Malvern until his death on April 5, 1952. Mr. Glover, known for his talent as a trial lawyer, once commented on legal fees taken on contingency, “I don't know but one way to divide and that's by two.” He is interred at Shadowlawn Cemetery in Malvern.

Glover's brother, Robert W. Glover, was a Missionary Baptist pastor who served in both houses of the Arkansas Legislature (1905–1912) from Sheridan. In 1909, Robert Glover introduced the resolution calling for the establishment of four state agricultural colleges.

U.S. House of Representatives
Preceded by James B. Reed	Member of the U.S. House of Representatives from Arkansas's 6th congressional district 1929–1935	Succeeded by John L. McClellan
