= Walter F. Lineberger =

American politician (1883–1943)

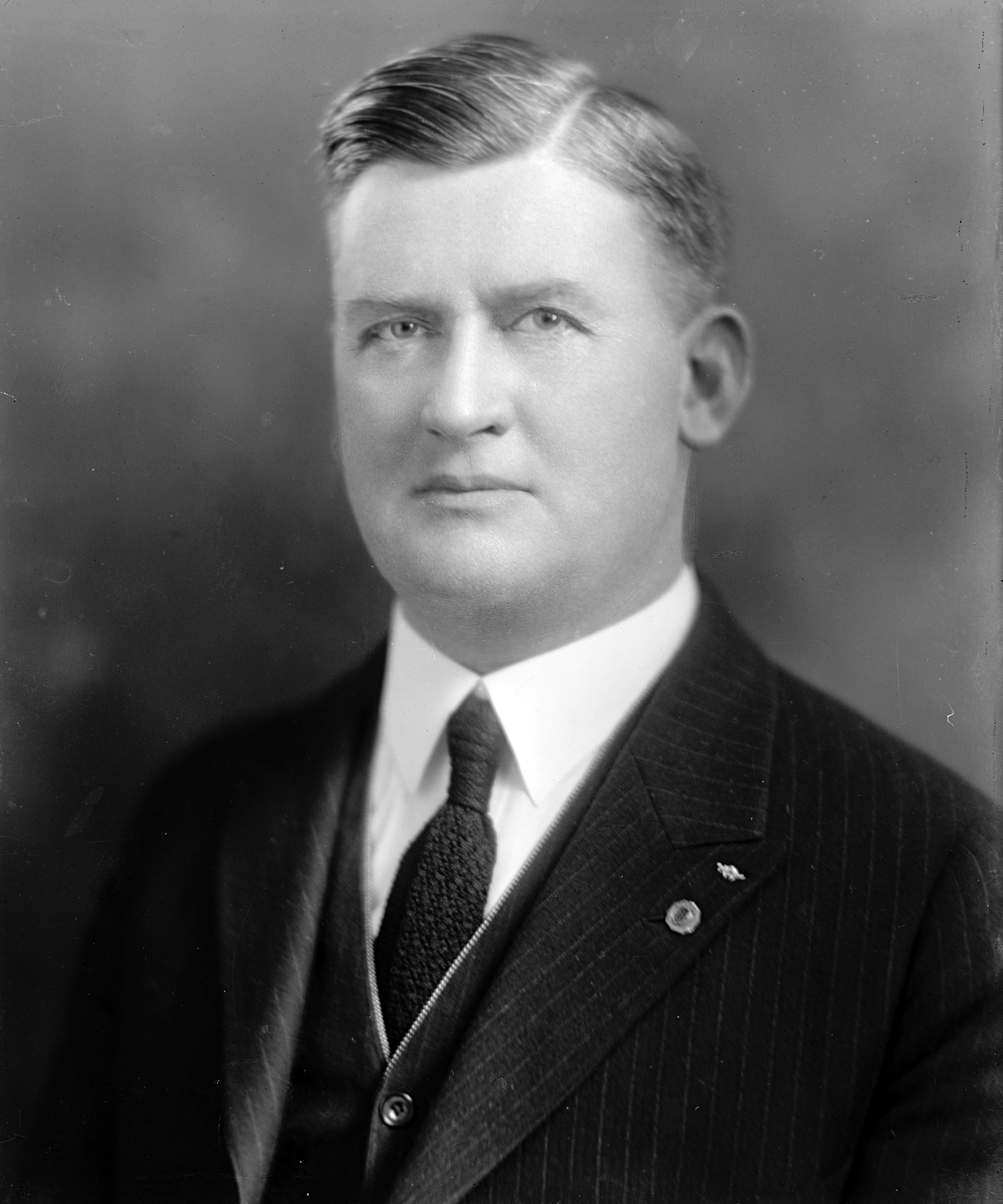
- Walter F. Lineberger

Member of the U.S. House of Representatives from California's 9th district
- In office April 11, 1921 – March 3, 1927
- Preceded by: Charles F. Van de Water
- Succeeded by: William E. Evans

Personal details
- Born: July 20, 1883 Whiteville, Tennessee, U.S.
- Died: October 9, 1943 (aged 60) Santa Barbara, California, U.S.
- Occupation: Businessman

Walter Franklin Lineberger (July 20, 1883 – October 9, 1943) was an American businessman and politician who served as a U.S. representative from California for three terms from 1921 to 1927.

== Early life and career ==
Born near Whiteville, Tennessee, Lineberger attended the local public schools, the Agricultural and Mechanical College of Texas, and the Rensselaer Polytechnic Institute, Troy, New York. He engaged in mining and agriculture in Mexico. In 1911, he moved to Long Beach, California, where he worked as a farmer and then as a banker. He served as president of the Guarantee Bond & Mortgage Co., Inc. He joined the Engineer Officers' Reserve Corps of United States Army in June 1917 and served with the 116th, 1st, 107th and 115th Engineer Battalions until he was discharged in March 1919 at the rank of major. He served in France during World War I from December 1917 until March 1919 and received the Croix de guerre.

== Congress ==
Lineberger was elected as a Republican to the Sixty-seventh Congress to fill the vacancy caused by the death of United States Representative-elect Charles F. Van de Water in California's Ninth Congressional District. He won a special election on February 15, 1921, by a vote of 32,442 to 21,056 for Prohibition candidate Charles H. Randall, whom Van de Water had defeated for re-election three months earlier. Lineberger had 58.5% of the vote to Randall's 38.0%.

Re-elected to the Sixty-eighth and Sixty-ninth Congresses, Lineberger served in the House of Representatives from April 11, 1921, to March 3, 1927. He won reelection with 59.1% of the vote in 1922 and with 63.9% in 1924. Lineberger did not seek renomination to the House in 1926, but was an unsuccessful candidate for the Republican nomination as United States Senator.

== Personal life ==
Lineberger started a business in oil securities in 1932. He died on October 9, 1943, in Santa Barbara, California, and was interred in Santa Barbara Cemetery.

== Electoral history ==
Republican Walter F. Lineberger won the special election to replace fellow Republican Charles F. Van de Water, who won the election but died before the 67th Congress convened. Data for this special election is not available.

United States House of Representatives elections, 1922
Party	Candidate	Votes	%
Republican	Walter F. Lineberger (Incumbent)	66,265	59.1
Prohibition	Charles Hiram Randall	45,794	40.9
Total votes		112,059	100.0
Turnout			
Republican hold			

United States House of Representatives elections, 1924
Party	Candidate	Votes	%
Republican	Walter F. Lineberger (Incumbent)	119,993	63.9
Prohibition	Charles Hiram Randall	67,735	36.1
Total votes		187,728	100.0
Turnout			
Republican hold			

== Sources ==
- United States Congress. "Walter F. Lineberger (id: L000331)". Biographical Directory of the United States Congress.

U.S. House of Representatives
Preceded by Charles H. Randall	Member of the U.S. House of Representatives from California's 9th congressional district 1921–1927	Succeeded by William E. Evans
