= William H. Frankhauser =

American politician

William Frankhauser

Member of the U.S. House of Representatives from Michigan's 3rd district
- In office March 4, 1921 – May 9, 1921
- Preceded by: John M. C. Smith
- Succeeded by: John M. C. Smith

Personal details
- Born: William Horace Frankhauser; March 5, 1863 Wood County, Ohio, U.S.
- Died: May 9, 1921 (aged 58) Battle Creek, Michigan, U.S.
- Education: Eastern Michigan University

William Horace Frankhauser (March 5, 1863 – May 9, 1921) was an American politician from the U.S. state of Michigan.

Frankhauser was born in Wood County, Ohio and moved with his parents to Monroe, Michigan, in 1875. He attended the public schools, Michigan State Normal School (now Eastern Michigan University at Ypsilanti, Michigan, and Oberlin College, Oberlin, Ohio. He was a school teacher for several years, studied law and was admitted to the bar in 1891. He commenced practice in Hillsdale, Michigan and became city attorney and prosecutor of Hillsdale County, 1896–1903.

Frankhauser was elected as a Republican from Michigan's 3rd congressional district to the 67th United States Congress, and served from March 4, 1921, until his death. He was in poor health and was unable to attend any sessions of congress. On May 9, 1921, while at the Battle Creek Sanitarium in Battle Creek, Michigan, Frankhauser died from suicide by cutting his throat with a razor blade.

John M. C. Smith, whom Frankhauser defeated in 1920, was elected in a special election to fill in the vacancy on June 28, 1921.

== See also ==
- List of members of the United States Congress who died in office (1900–1949)

== Sources ==
- United States Congress. "William H. Frankhauser (id: F000341)". Biographical Directory of the United States Congress.
- William H. Frankhauser at The Political Graveyard

U.S. House of Representatives
Preceded by John M. C. Smith	United States Representative for Michigan's 3rd congressional district March 4, 1921 – May 9, 1921	Succeeded by John M. C. Smith
