= Sheridan High School (Arkansas) =

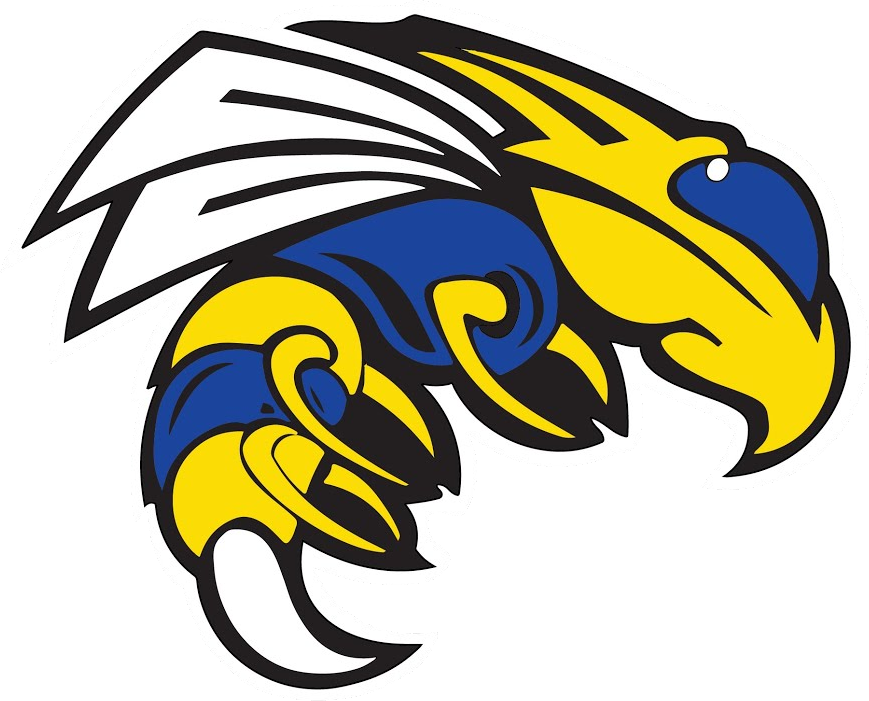

Location
- 700 West Vine Street; Sheridan, Grant County, Arkansas 72150; United States; 34°18′42″N 92°24′28″W

Information
- Other names: SHS and/or Sheridan High
- School type: Public comprehensive
- Founded: 1913 (113 years ago)
- Status: Open
- School district: Sheridan School District
- CEEB code: 042265
- NCES School ID: 050001500997
- Teaching staff: 118.88
- Grades: 9–12
- Enrollment: 1,265 (2023-2024)
- Student to teacher ratio: 10.64
- Education system: ADE Smart Core
- Classes offered: Regular, Advanced Placement (AP)
- Hours in school day: 7 hours.
- Colors: Blue and gold
- Song: O Sheridan High
- Athletics conference: 7A/6A South (2022–23)
- Sports: Football, Basketball, Baseball, and Soccer
- Mascot: Yellowjacket
- Nickname: Jackets
- Team name: Sheridan Yellowjackets
- Rival: White Hall
- Accreditation: AdvancED
- USNWR ranking: No. 21 (AR); No. 1,976 (USA)
- National ranking: No. 1,271 of 2,008
- Publication: Yellowjacket news (disc. October, 8th, 2022).
- Yearbook: The Yellowjacket
- Key products: Yellowjacket store with merchandise
- Affiliation: Saline County Technical and Career Center
- Website: www.sheridanschools.org/o/shs
- Last updated: May 6, 2023

Sheridan High School is a comprehensive four-year public high school located in Sheridan, Arkansas, United States. It is one of two public high schools in Grant County and the sole high school administered by the Sheridan School District.

In 2012, Sheridan High School was nationally recognized as a silver medalist in the U.S. News & World Report Best High Schools 2012 report, which ranked the school as the No. 1,976 high school in the nation and No. 21 in Arkansas. Sheridan High School was ranked No. 1,271 of 2,008 high schools in the 2012 Challenge Index high school scoring system with an index score of 1.683, which is the number of college-level tests given at a school in 2011 divided by the number of graduates that year.

== History ==
Sheridan was a segregated school for African-Americans until the Brown v. Board of Education decision. At the time, Sheridan had around 199 African American residents out of the town's total population of 1898. On May 21, 1954, the local school board voted unanimously to integrate its twenty-one African-American students into its high school to avoid the $4,000 it would have cost the school board to send the African American students to Jefferson County. The white parents became upset and called another vote the next night. At that vote, the board voted unanimously to segregate the local school. Community members in the area, still not happy, petitioned and forced four school board members to step down.

Next, the largest employer of African-Americans in the area offered to move the black families outside of Grant County to Malvern, at the employer's own expense, or burn their houses down. After the departure of the last African-American student from the city limits, the city bulldozed the African-American school; the remnants of the school were buried and the city no longer had a duty to integrate their schools.

In 1990, a series of student suicides, including one in a classroom at the high school, stunned the community and thrust Sheridan, Arkansas, into the national spotlight.

In 2014, Sheridan High School made national news after District Superintendent Brenda Haynes directed the Yellowjacket Yearbook committee they must refuse to publish a student profile in the yearbook featuring a student who had come out as gay during the year, stating, "We must make decisions that lead in the proper direction for all of our students and for our community. We must not make decisions based on demands by any special interest group." Despite receiving a petition containing over 30,000 signatures and being the subject of multiple community-based protests in support of publishing the student's profile, the school board refused to reverse their decision.

== Curriculum ==
The assumed course of study for Sheridan students follows the Smart Core curriculum developed by the Arkansas Department of Education (ADE), which requires students complete 22 units prior to graduation. Students complete regular coursework and exams and may elect to take Advanced Placement (AP) courses and exams with the opportunity for college credit. Students have been recognized for exceptional achievement on AP exams to include being honored as AP Scholar with Honor, AP Scholar with Distinction, and National AP Scholar.

The school is accredited by the ADE and has been accredited by AdvancED since 1950.

Students who complete the Smart Core curriculum with an exceptional grade point average (GPA) may qualify as an Honor Graduate, with High Honor Graduate and Distinguished Honor Graduate awarded to students with successively higher GPAs and more AP course completions.

== Athletics ==
The Sheridan High School mascot is the Yellowjacket with blue and gold serving as the school colors.

The Sheridan Yellowjackets compete in interscholastic activities within the 6A Classification—the state's second largest classification—via the 7A/6A South Conference administered by the Arkansas Activities Association. The Yellowjackets field teams in football, golf (boys/girls), volleyball, cross country (boys/girls), tennis (boys/girls), basketball (boys/girls), swimming and diving (boys/girls), soccer (boys/girls), track and field (boys/girls), baseball, softball, competitive cheer and dance.

In 2010, student-athlete Christopher Marchman was selected as the 2009-10 Gatorade Arkansas Boys Cross Country Runner of the Year after winning his second consecutive 7A state individual title.

== Notable people ==
- David Delano Glover (1886), Politician; member of U.S. House of Representatives (1929–1935)
- Ray Hamilton (1934), Athlete, NFL player; Arkansas Sports Hall of Fame inductee
- John Little McClellan (1908), Politician; member of U.S. House of Representatives (1935–1939) and U.S. Senate (1943–1977)
- Ray Thornton, Politician; member of U.S. House of Representatives (1973–1979, 1991–1997), Arkansas Attorney General (1971–1973)
- John Thurston (1991), Politician; Arkansas Commissioner of State Lands (2010–present)
