= Samuel M. Taylor =

American politician (1852–1921)

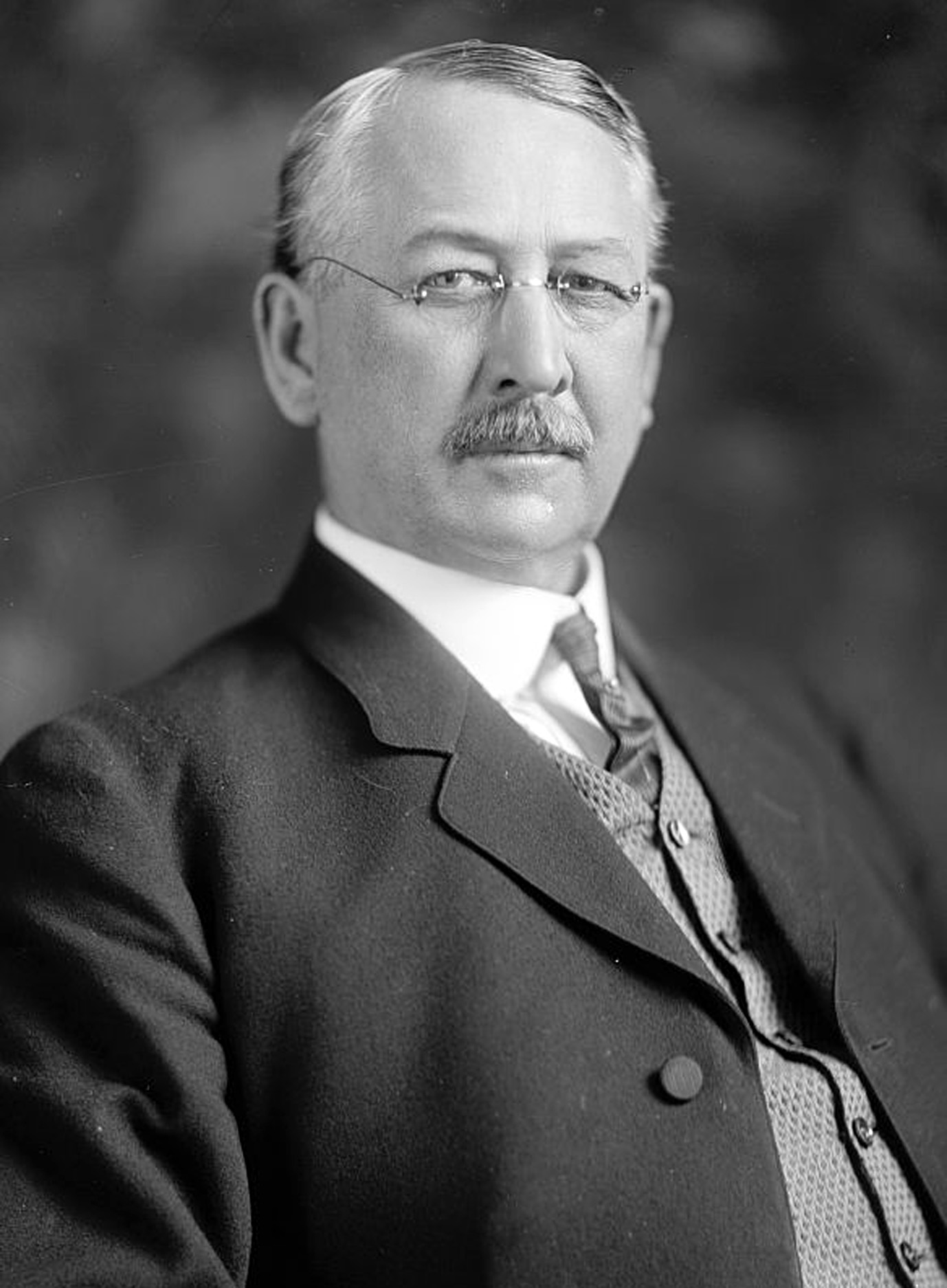

Member of the U.S. House of Representatives from Arkansas's 6th district
- In office January 15, 1913 – September 13, 1921
- Preceded by: Joseph T. Robinson
- Succeeded by: Chester W. Taylor

Member of the Mississippi House of Representatives
- In office 1879–1880

Personal details
- Born: Samuel Mitchell Taylor; May 25, 1852 near Fulton, Mississippi, U.S.
- Died: September 13, 1921 (aged 69) Washington, D.C., U.S.
- Resting place: Bellewood Cemetery, Pine Bluff, Arkansas, U.S.
- Party: Democratic
- Children: Chester
- Profession: Politician, lawyer

Samuel Mitchell Taylor (May 25, 1852 – September 13, 1921) was a U.S. representative from Arkansas, father of Chester W. Taylor.

Born near Fulton, Mississippi, Taylor attended the public schools. He studied law. He was admitted to the bar in Tupelo, Mississippi, and commenced practice in 1876. He served as member of the State house of representatives in 1879 and 1880. He moved to Pine Bluff, Arkansas, in 1887, where he continued the practice of law. He served as prosecuting attorney of the eleventh judicial district of Arkansas 1888-1892. He served as delegate to the Democratic National Convention in 1896.

Taylor was elected as a Democrat to the 63rd United States Congress.

Taylor was subsequently elected to the Sixty-second Congress to fill the vacancy caused by the resignation of Joseph T. Robinson. He was reelected to the Sixty-fourth and to the three succeeding Congresses and served from January 15, 1913, until his death in Washington, D.C., September 13, 1921. He was interred in Bellewood Cemetery, Pine Bluff, Arkansas.

== See also ==
- List of members of the United States Congress who died in office (1900–1949)

U.S. House of Representatives
Preceded by Joseph T. Robinson	Member of the U.S. House of Representatives from Arkansas's 6th congressional district 1913–1921	Succeeded by Chester W. Taylor
