= Charles F. Van de Water =

American politician (1872–1920)

Charles Van de Water
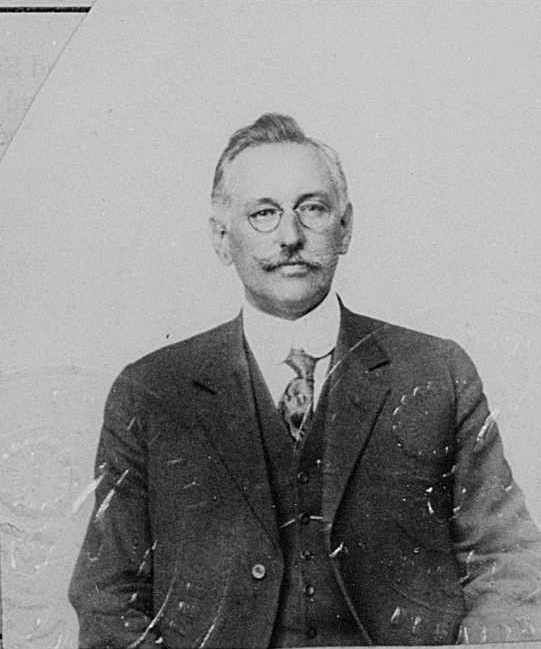

Member-elect of the U.S. House of Representatives from California's 9th district
- Died before taking office
- Preceded by: Charles Randall
- Succeeded by: Walter F. Lineberger

Personal details
- Born: October 12, 1872 Hobart, New York, U.S.
- Died: November 20, 1920 (aged 48) Walnut, California, U.S.
- Party: Republican

Charles F. Van de Water (October 12, 1872 – November 20, 1920) was a Republican politician in California. Born in Hobart, New York, Van de Water won a seat in the United States House of Representatives from California's 9th congressional district in the 1920 election by defeating Prohibition Party incumbent Charles H. Randall.

Van de Water died in a car crash before assuming office, and Republican Walter F. Lineberger later won a special election to fill the vacancy.

== See also ==
- List of United States representatives-elect who never took their seats

U.S. House of Representatives
Preceded by Charles Randall	Member-elect of the U.S. House of Representatives from California's 9th congressional district 1920	Succeeded by Walter F. Lineberger
