= James B. Reed =

American politician (1881–1935)

James Byron Reed

Member of the U.S. House of Representatives from Arkansas's 6th district
- In office October 6, 1923 – March 3, 1929
- Preceded by: Lewis E. Sawyer
- Succeeded by: David Delano Glover

Member of the Arkansas House of Representatives
- In office 1907

Personal details
- Born: January 2, 1881 Lonoke County; Arkansas, USA
- Died: April 27, 1935 (aged 54) Little Rock, Arkansas
- Resting place: Lonoke Cemetery in Lonoke, Arkansas
- Party: Democratic
- Education: Hendrix College; University of Arkansas
- Occupation: Attorney

James Byron Reed (January 2, 1881 – April 27, 1935) was a U.S. representative from Arkansas' former 6th congressional district.

Born near Lonoke, Arkansas, Reed attended the rural schools of his county and Hendrix College, a Methodist institution in Conway, Arkansas. In 1906, he graduated from the law department of the University of Arkansas at Fayetteville and was admitted to the bar that same year. A lawyer in private practice, he was a member of the Arkansas House of Representatives in the 1907 session. From 1912 to 1916, Reed he was the prosecuting attorney of the 17th Judicial District Court.

Reed was elected as a Democrat to the Sixty-eighth Congress to fill the vacancy caused by the death of United States Representative Lewis E. Sawyer. He was reelected to the Sixty-ninth and Seventieth Congresses (October 6, 1923 - March 3, 1929). He was an unsuccessful candidate for renomination in 1928, having been unseated by David Delano Glover, a lawyer from Malvern, Arkansas.

Reed died on April 27, 1935, in Little Rock and is interred at Lonoke Cemetery in his native Lonoke.

U.S. House of Representatives
Preceded by Lewis E. Sawyer	Member of the U.S. House of Representatives from Arkansas's 6th congressional district 1923–1929	Succeeded by David Delano Glover
