= Lewis E. Sawyer =

American politician

Member of the U.S. House of Representatives from Arkansas's 6th district
- In office March 4, 1923 – May 5, 1923
- Preceded by: Chester W. Taylor
- Succeeded by: James B. Reed

Speaker of the Arkansas House of Representatives
- In office 1915–1917
- Preceded by: Joe Hardage
- Succeeded by: William Lee Cazort

Member of the Arkansas House of Representatives
- In office 1913–1917

Personal details
- Born: June 24, 1867 Shelby County, Alabama, US
- Died: May 5, 1923 (aged 55) Hot Springs, Arkansas, US
- Party: Democratic

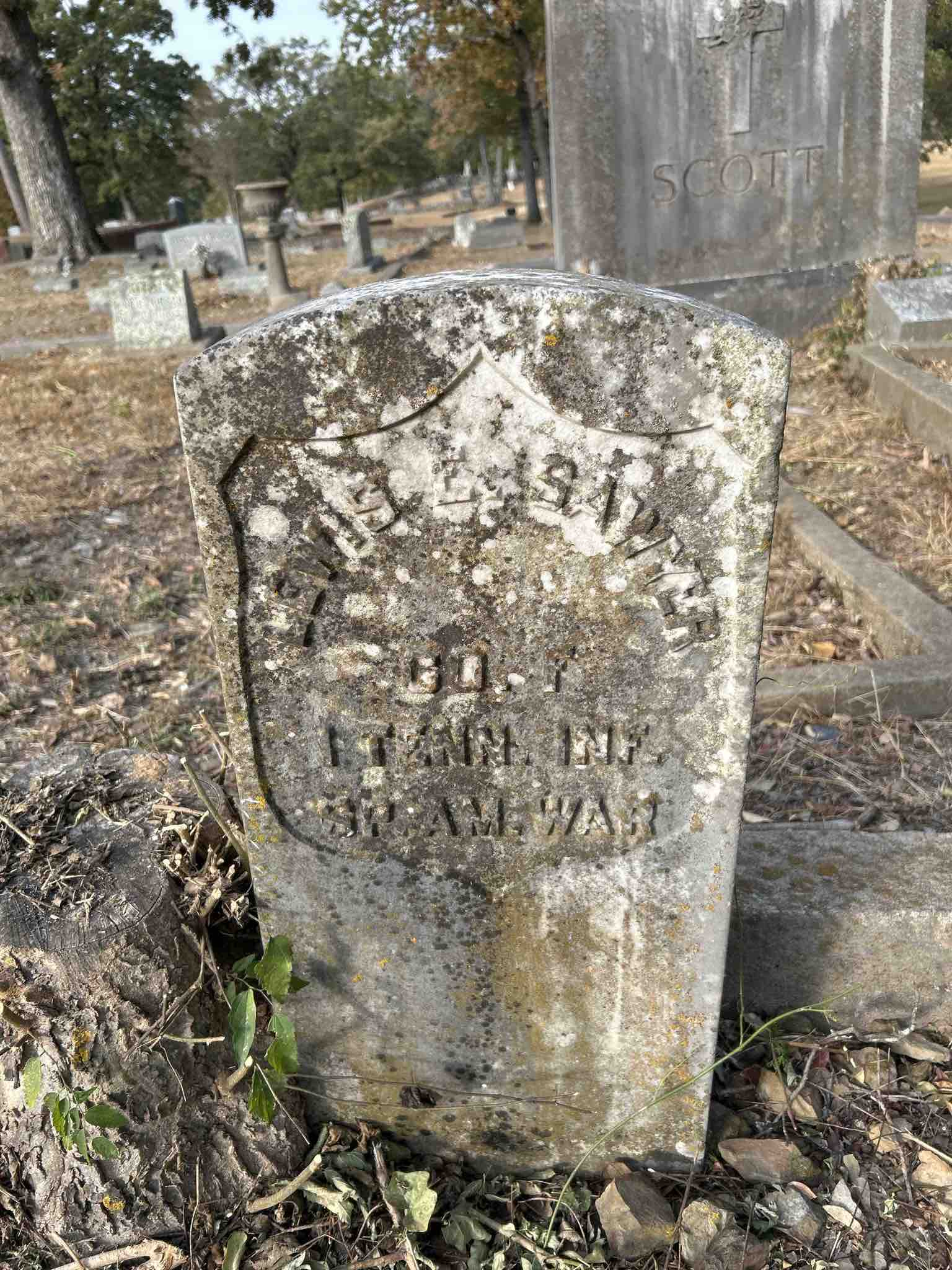
Lewis E. Sawyer Headstone, Hollywood Cemetery, Hot Springs, Garland, Arkansas

Lewis Ernest Sawyer (June 24, 1867 – May 5, 1923) was a U.S. representative from Arkansas.

The son of Lt. Col. Benjamin Franklin Sawyer and Charlotte Simmons Armbrester.

He was raised by his Aunt Virginia (Sawyer) Dabbs and her husband Dr. Adam Hoyle Dabbs since he was three years old in 1870. They were living in Guntown, Lee, Mississippi.

He attended the public schools and was graduated from the University of Mississippi at Oxford. He studied law. He was admitted to the bar and commenced practice at Friars Point, Mississippi, in 1895.

He served as mayor of Friars Point from 1896 until he enlisted in the Spanish–American War in June 1898. He served in the Philippine Islands during the war.

He resumed the practice of law in Iuka, Mississippi, in 1900.

He married Mrs. Sarah (Hastings) Miller on 26 January 1902 in Tishomingo, Mississippi.

He moved to Hot Springs, Arkansas, in 1908 and continued the practice of his profession. He served as member of the Arkansas House of Representatives in 1913 and 1915. He served as Speaker of the Arkansas House of Representatives in 1915.

Sawyer was elected as a Democrat to the Sixty-eighth Congress and served from March 4, 1923, until his death at Hot Springs, Arkansas, on May 5, 1923. He was interred in Hollywood Cemetery.

== See also ==
- List of members of the United States Congress who died in office (1900–1949)

U.S. House of Representatives
Preceded by Chester W. Taylor	Member of the U.S. House of Representatives from Arkansas's 6th congressional district March 4, 1923 – May 5, 1923	Succeeded by James B. Reed
