= William Y. Humphreys =

American politician (1890–1933)

Member of the U.S. House of Representatives from Mississippi's 3rd district
- In office November 27, 1923 – March 3, 1925
- Preceded by: Benjamin G. Humphreys II
- Succeeded by: William M. Whittington

Personal details
- Born: William Yerger Humphreys; September 9, 1890 Greenville, Mississippi, U.S.
- Died: February 26, 1933 (aged 42) Greenville, Mississippi, U.S.
- Resting place: Greenville Cemetery
- Party: Democratic
- Parent: Benjamin G. Humphreys II (father)
- Relatives: Benjamin G. Humphreys (paternal grandfather)
- Education: Sewanee Grammar School
- Occupation: Lawyer, politician

William Yerger Humphreys (September 9, 1890 – February 26, 1933) was an American lawyer and politician who served one term as a U.S. representative from Mississippi from 1923 to 1925.

== Early life ==
William Y. Humphreys was born on September 9, 1890, in Greenville, Washington County, Mississippi. His father was Benjamin G. Humphreys II.

Humphreys attended the public schools and Sewanee Grammar School, Sewanee, Tennessee. He studied law at George Washington University, Washington, D.C., from 1911 to 1914, while in the employ of the United States House of Representatives as assistant superintendent of the House document room.

== Career ==
Humphreys was admitted to the bar on June 1, 1914, and commenced practice in Greenville, Mississippi. He served as first lieutenant in the Chemical Warfare Service of the United States Army during the First World War.

=== Congress ===
Humphreys was elected as a Democrat to the Sixty-eighth Congress to fill the vacancy caused by the death of his father, Benjamin G. Humphreys II, and served from November 27, 1923, to March 3, 1925. He was not a candidate for renomination in 1924. He resumed the practice of law in Greenville, Mississippi.

=== Later career ===
Humphreys served as prosecuting attorney of Washington County from 1928 to 1933.

== Death ==
Humphreys died on February 26, 1933, in Greenville, Mississippi. He was interred in Greenville Cemetery.

U.S. House of Representatives
Preceded by Benjamin G. Humphreys II	Member of the U.S. House of Representatives from Mississippi's 3rd congressional district 1923-1925	Succeeded by William M. Whittington
