= Benjamin G. Humphreys II =

American politician (1865–1923)

Benjamin Grubb Humphreys II
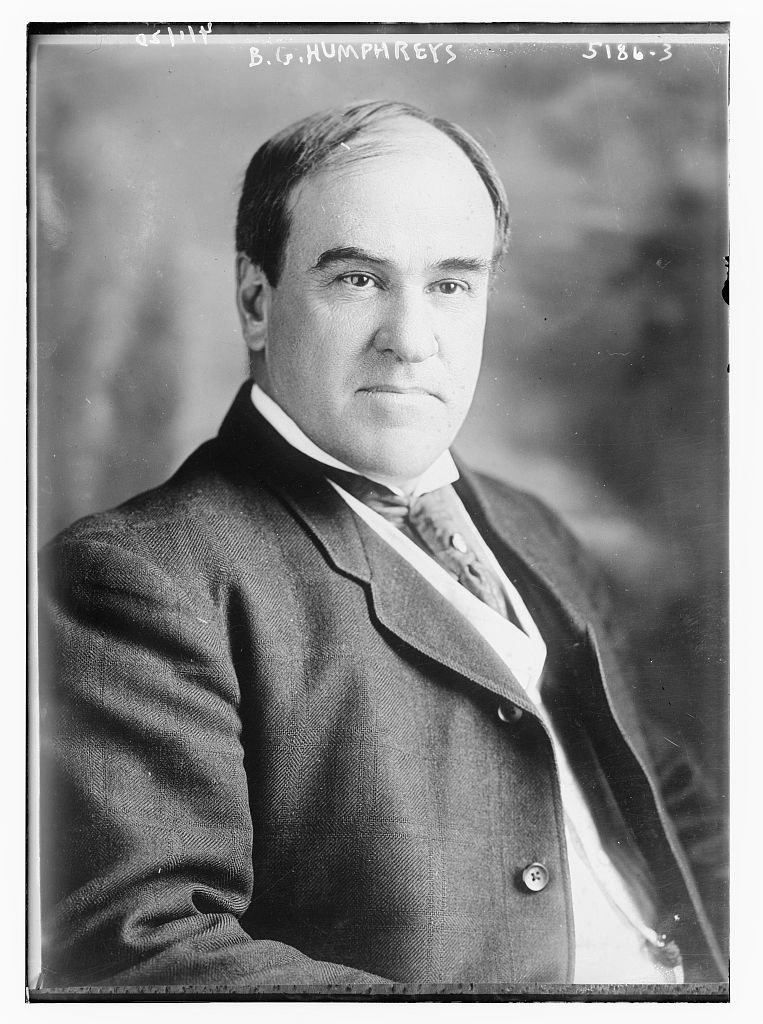
- Humphreys II circa 1920

Member of the U.S. House of Representatives from Mississippi's 3rd district
- In office March 4, 1903 – October 16, 1923
- Preceded by: Pat Henry
- Succeeded by: William Y. Humphreys

Personal details
- Born: Benjamin Grubb Humphreys II; August 17, 1865 Claiborne County, Mississippi, U.S.
- Died: October 16, 1923 (aged 58) Greenville, Mississippi, U.S.
- Resting place: Greenville Cemetery
- Children: William
- Parent: Benjamin G. Humphreys (father)
- Occupation: Lawyer, politician

Benjamin Grubb Humphreys II (August 17, 1865 – October 16, 1923) was an American lawyer and politician who served ten consecutive terms as a U.S. representative from Mississippi from 1903 to 1923.

He was known by his constituents as "Our Ben."

== Early life ==
Benjamin Grubb Humphreys II was born on August 17, 1865, in Claiborne County, Mississippi. His father was Benjamin G. Humphreys.

Humphreys attended the public schools at Lexington, Mississippi, and the University of Mississippi at Oxford where he studied law. He was admitted to the bar in 1891 and commenced practice in Greenwood, Mississippi.

== Career ==
Humphreys served as the superintendent of education for Leflore County 1892–1896. He served as district attorney for the fourth district of Mississippi 1895–1903.

=== Spanish-American War ===
He raised a company in April 1898 for service in the Spanish–American War and was its first lieutenant, serving under Maj. Gen. Fitzhugh Lee in Florida during the entire war.

=== Congress ===
Humphreys was elected as a Democrat to the Fifty-eighth and to the ten succeeding Congresses and served from March 4, 1903, until his death. He served as chairman of the Committee on Territories (Sixty-second Congress), Committee on Flood Control (Sixty-fourth and Sixty-fifth Congresses). He served as delegate to the Democratic National Convention in 1920.

== Death ==
Humphreys died in Greenville, Mississippi, October 16, 1923. He was interred in Greenville Cemetery.

== See also ==
- List of members of the United States Congress who died in office (1900–1949)

U.S. House of Representatives
Preceded by Patrick S. Henry	Member of the U.S. House of Representatives from Mississippi's 3rd congressional district 1903-1923	Succeeded by William Y. Humphreys
