= John M. C. Smith =

American politician

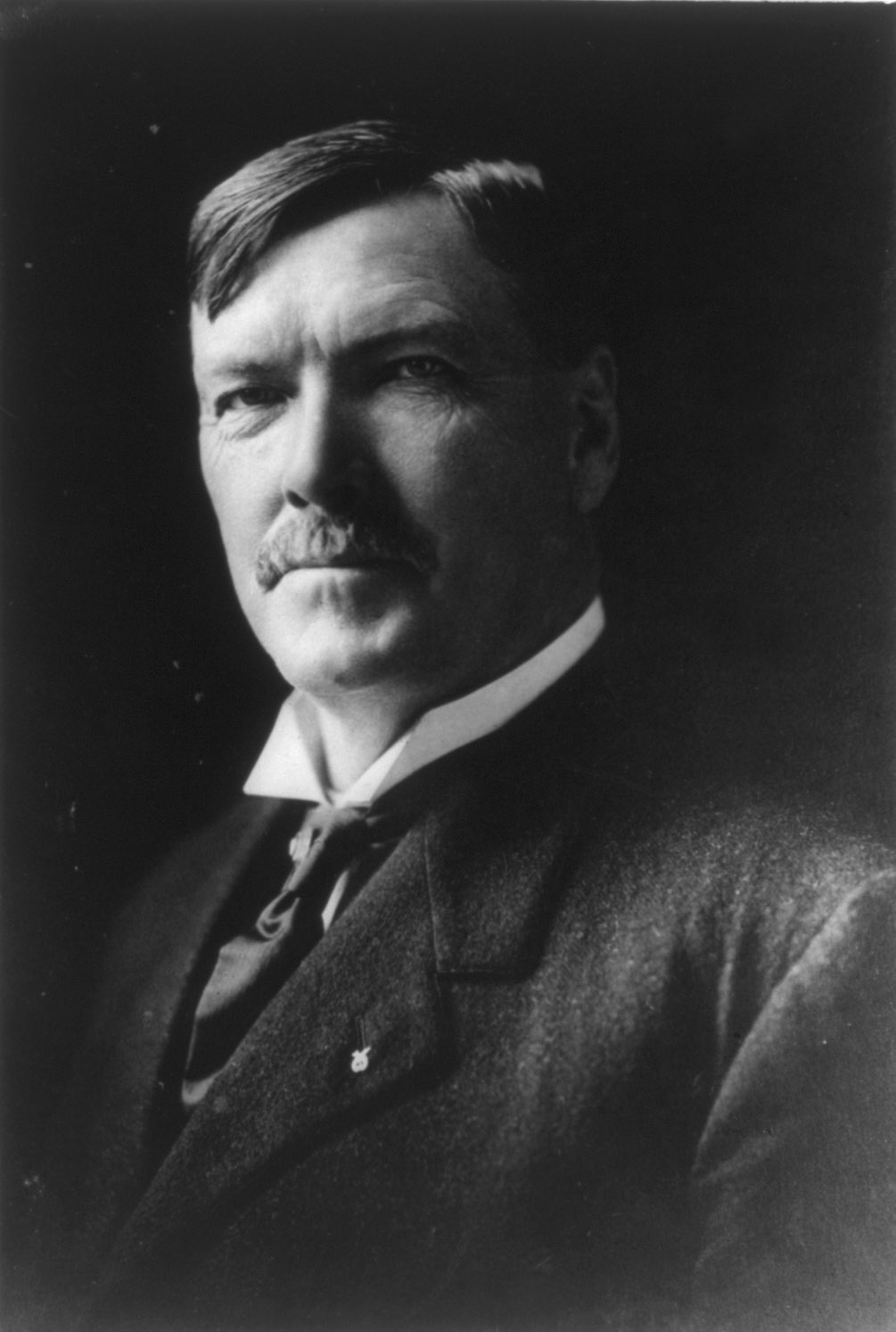
- Smith (c. 1921)

Member of the U.S. House of Representatives from Michigan's 3rd district
- In office March 4, 1911 – March 3, 1921
- Preceded by: Washington Gardner
- Succeeded by: William H. Frankhauser

Member of the U.S. House of Representatives from Michigan's 3rd district
- In office June 28, 1921 – March 30, 1923
- Preceded by: William H. Frankhauser
- Succeeded by: Arthur B. Williams

Personal details
- Born: February 6, 1853 Belfast, Ireland, U.K.
- Died: March 30, 1923 (aged 70) Charlotte, Michigan, U.S.
- Resting place: Maple Hill Cemetery; Charlotte, Michigan, U.S.
- Party: Republican
- Spouse: Lena Parkhurst
- Children: 2
- Education: University of Michigan

John M. C. Smith (February 6, 1853 – March 30, 1923) was a politician from the U.S. state of Michigan. He served as U.S. Representative from Michigan's 3rd congressional district.

== Biography ==
Smith's grave (center) at Maple Hill Cemetery

Smith was born in 1853 in Belfast on the island of Ireland (the entirety of which was then a part of the U.K.). He immigrated to the United States in 1855 with his parents, who settled near Plymouth, Ohio, where he attended the public schools. He moved to Charlotte, Michigan, in 1867 where he engaged in agricultural pursuits and also worked as a mason. He graduated from the academic department of the University of Michigan at Ann Arbor in 1879 and from the law department in 1880. He was admitted to the bar in 1882 and commenced practice in Detroit. He was married to Lena Parkhurst, daughter of Major John D. Parkhurst of Charlotte, on October 23, 1887. They had two children, Lucile (born in 1889) and William P. Smith.

Smith served as prosecuting attorney of Eaton County 1885-1888. He was president of the First National Bank of Charlotte in 1898 and also engaged in manufacturing and agricultural pursuits. Smith was a member of the board of aldermen in 1903 and a member of the State constitutional convention in 1908.

Smith was elected as a Republican to the Sixty-second and to the four succeeding Congresses, serving from March 4, 1911, until March 3, 1921. He was chairman of the United States House Committee on Labor in the Sixty-sixth Congress. Smith was not a candidate for renomination in 1920, but returned to Congress when he was elected to the Sixty-seventh Congress to fill the vacancy caused by the death of William H. Frankhauser, who died in office on May 9, 1921. Smith was reelected to the Sixty-eighth Congress, serving from June 28, 1921, until his death in Charlotte. He is interred in Maple Hill Cemetery in Charlotte.

== See also ==
- List of members of the United States Congress who died in office (1900–1949)

U.S. House of Representatives
Preceded by Washington Gardner	United States Representative for the 3rd congressional district of Michigan; March 4, 1911 – March 3, 1921	Succeeded by William H. Frankhauser
Preceded by William H. Frankhauser, after vacancy	United States Representative for the 3rd congressional district of Michigan; June 28, 1921 – March 30, 1923	Succeeded by Arthur B. Williams
