= Arkansas's congressional delegations =

Map of Arkansas's four congressional districts for the United States House of Representatives since 2023

Arkansas has sent congressional delegations to the United States Senate and United States House of Representatives since it became a state in 1836, with the exception of the Civil War and Reconstruction period between 1861 and 1868. (Note: Arkansas sent its congressional delegation to the Confederate States Congress during the Civil War.) Before becoming a state, the Arkansas Territory elected a non-voting delegate at-large to Congress, beginning with the 16th United States Congress in 1819. Arkansas first sent a voting representative to Congress in the 25th United States Congress, following its statehood.

Each U.S. state elects two senators to serve for six years in general elections, with their re-election staggered. Prior to the ratification of the Seventeenth Amendment in 1913, Arkansas senators were elected by the Arkansas General Assembly; afterwards, senators were elected directly by the people of the state.

Each state elects at least one member of the House to a two-year term. The number of House members is proportional to the state's share of the national population, and changes every ten years with the results of the United States Census. Arkansas's representation began with one representative immediately after statehood, and peaked from 1903 to 1953 following the 1900 United States census, with seven seats in the House. Arkansas has sent four members to the House in each congressional delegation since 1963.

As a senator for 34 years, from 1942 to 1977, John L. McClellan was the longest-serving senator to represent Arkansas in Congress. The current dean, or longest-serving incumbent, of Arkansas's congressional delegation is senator John Boozman, who has represented Arkansas in Congress since 2001. While Arkansas politics was dominated by the Democratic Party from the 1870s to the 1960s, Arkansas's current delegation consists entirely of Republicans. Some scholars consider the 2010 elections the beginning of the modern rise of the Arkansas Republican Party.

== Current delegation ==
Current U.S. senators from Arkansas
Arkansas CPVI (2025): R+15	Class II senator	Class III senator
Arkansas CPVI (2025): R+15	Tom Cotton (Junior senator) (Little Rock)	John Boozman (Senior senator) (Rogers)
Party	Republican	Republican
Incumbent since	January 3, 2015	January 3, 2011

Arkansas's current congressional delegation in the 119th Congress consists of two senators and four representatives, all of whom are Republicans. The state has had four representatives in the House since 1963, following the 1960 census. The current dean, or longest-serving incumbent, of the Arkansas delegation is Senator John Boozman, who has represented Arkansas in the Senate since 2011 and in Congress since 2001.

The Cook Partisan Voting Index (CPVI) is a measure of how strongly partisan a state is. For each district or state, the CPVI measures the party leaning (Democratic or Republican) and the number of percentage points more partisan than the national average. For instance, a rating of R+4 would mean the district or state voted four percentage points more Republican than the national average, while a rating of D+9 would mean the district or state voted nine points more Democratic than the national average. As of 2025, the CPVI rated all four districts in Arkansas as leaning Republican, with the 1st district, represented by Rick Crawford in the House, leaning most heavily at R+23, and the 2nd district, represented by French Hill in the House, leaning the least at R+8. The CPVI gave Arkansas an R+15 rating as a whole.

Current U.S. representatives from Arkansas
District	Member (Residence)	Party	Incumbent since	CPVI (2025)	District map
1st	Rick Crawford (Jonesboro)	Republican	January 3, 2011	R+23	Map of Arkansas' 1st congressional district
2nd	French Hill (Little Rock)	Republican	January 3, 2015	R+8	Map of Arkansas' 2nd congressional district
3rd	Steve Womack (Rogers)	Republican	January 3, 2011	R+13	Map of Arkansas' 3rd congressional district
4th	Bruce Westerman (Hot Springs)	Republican	January 3, 2015	R+20	Map of Arkansas' 4th congressional district

== United States Senate ==
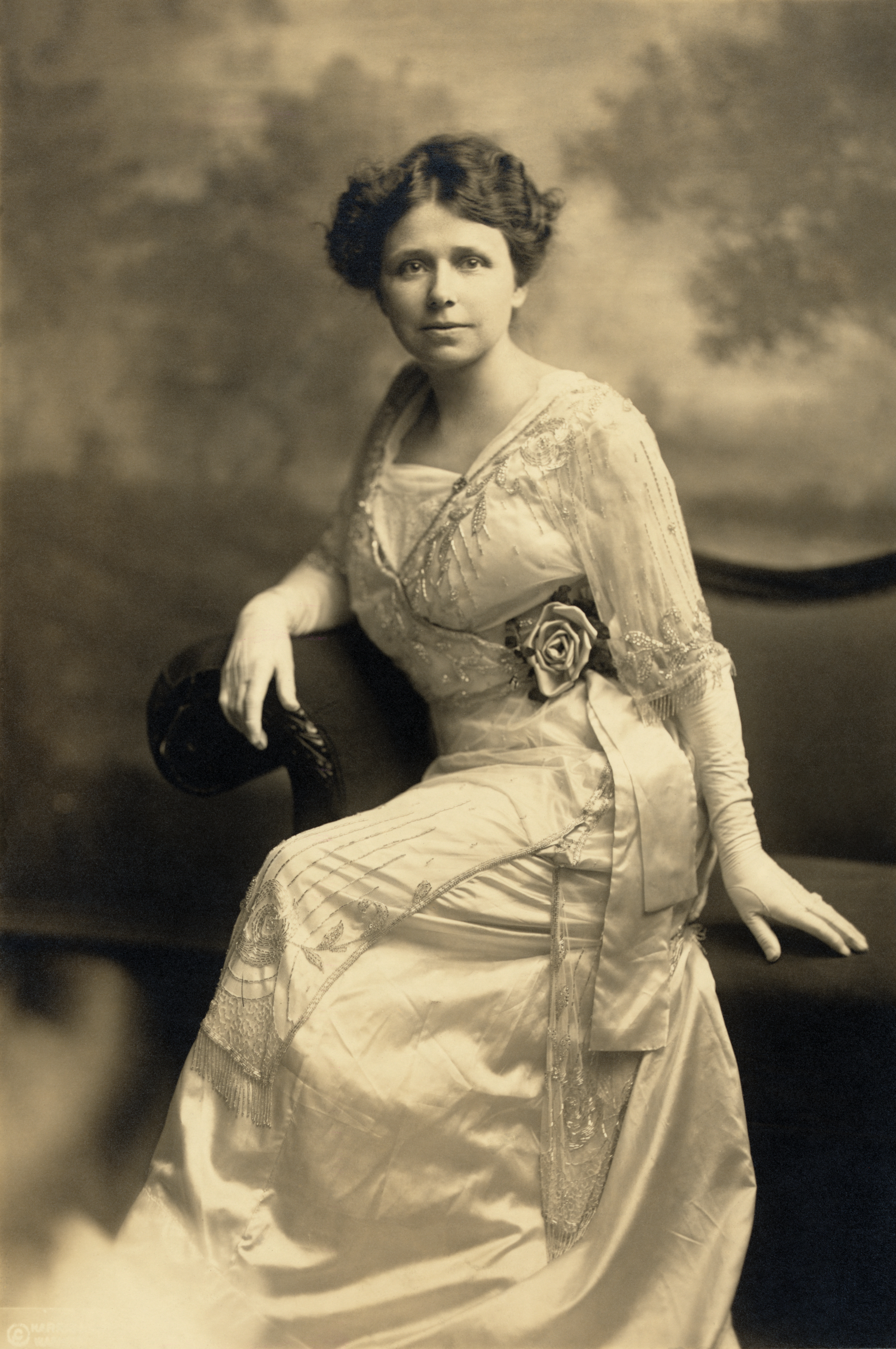
Hattie Caraway, Arkansas senator who was the first woman to be elected to the United States Senate for a full term

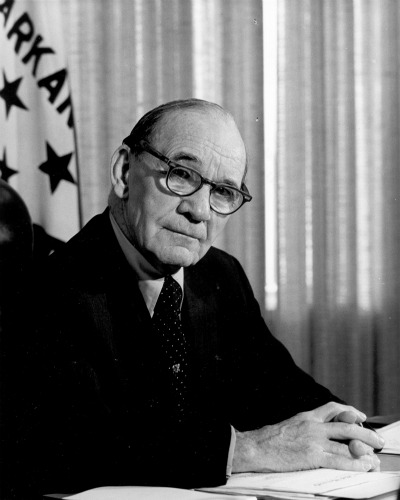
John McClellan, the longest-serving senator from Arkansas, who chaired the Senate Committee on Government Operations and Senate Appropriations Committee during his 34 years in office

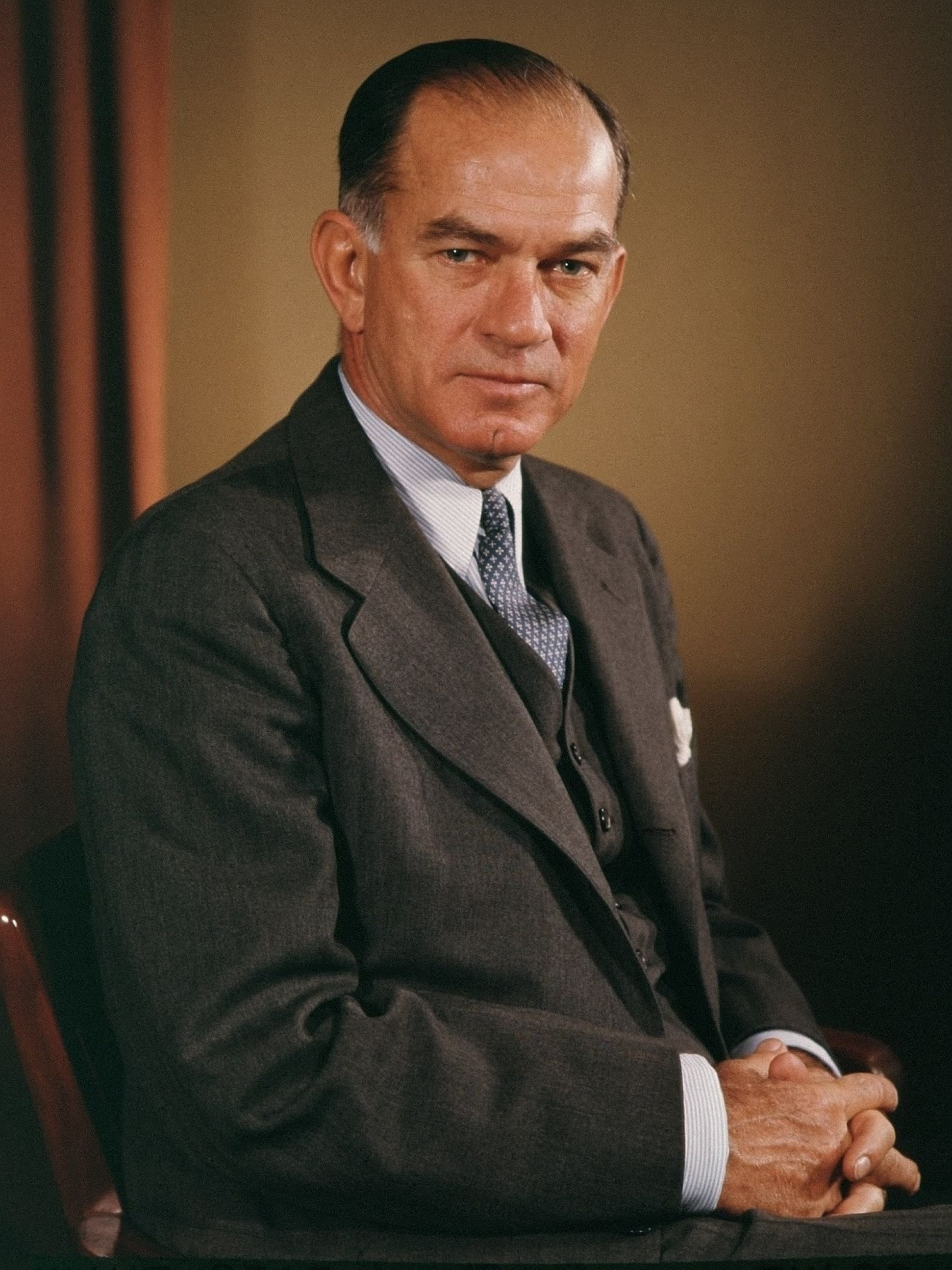
J. William Fulbright, Arkansas senator known for the Fulbright Program, his work as the chairman of the Senate Foreign Relations Committee, and his opposition to the civil rights movement

35 people have served as a U.S. senator from Arkansas, consisting of 33 men and two women, as well as 28 Democrats and 7 Republicans. Two, William K. Sebastian and Charles B. Mitchel, were expelled from the Senate because of Arkansas's secession from the Union at the start of the American Civil War; Sebastian was the only senator from a Confederate state to later be reinstated, albeit posthumously. After her husband's death in office, Hattie Caraway, became the first woman to be elected to a full term in the Senate, after finishing his term. The longest-serving senator from Arkansas, John L. McClellan, chaired many Senate committees during his 34 years in office, including the Senate Committee on Government Operations and the Senate Appropriations Committee. For some time, he served with J. William Fulbright, known for the Fulbright Program, establishing an American student exchange program; his chairing of the Senate Foreign Relations Committee, resulting in the Gulf of Tonkin Resolution and Fulbright hearings; and his opposition to the civil rights movement. Other senators from Arkansas also served in leadership roles in the Senate, including Joseph T. Robinson, who served as Senate Majority Leader, and Ambrose Sevier and James P. Clarke, who both served as president pro tempore of the Senate.

Senators are elected every six years depending on their class, with each senator serving a six-year term and elections for senators occurring every two years; the class up for re-election rotates such that each election, around one-third of the seats in the Senate are up for election. Arkansas's senators are elected in classes II and III. Currently, Arkansas is represented in the Senate by Tom Cotton and John Boozman.

Democratic (D)
Jacksonian (J)
Republican (R)

Senators from Arkansas
Class II senator	Congress	Class III senator
William S. Fulton (J)	24th (1835–1837)	Ambrose H. Sevier (J)
William S. Fulton (D) (Note: Fulton died on August 15, 1844, while in office.)	25th (1837–1839)	Ambrose H. Sevier (D) (Note: Sevier resigned in 1848, while in office, after being appointed as an American commissioner in the ratification of the Treaty of Guadalupe-Hidalgo.)
William S. Fulton (D)	26th (1839–1841)	Ambrose H. Sevier (D)
William S. Fulton (D)	27th (1841–1843)	Ambrose H. Sevier (D)
William S. Fulton (D)	28th (1843–1845)	Ambrose H. Sevier (D)
Chester Ashley (D) (Note: Ashley died on April 29, 1848, while in office.)	28th (1843–1845)	Ambrose H. Sevier (D)
Chester Ashley (D)	29th (1845–1847)	Ambrose H. Sevier (D)
Chester Ashley (D)	30th (1847–1849)	Ambrose H. Sevier (D)
William K. Sebastian (D) (Note: Sebastian was expelled from the Senate on July 11, 1861, on account of Arkansas' secession from the Union. He was the only senator from a Confederate state to later be symbolically reinstated, albeit posthumously, in 1877.)	30th (1847–1849)	Solon Borland (D) (Note: Borland was appointed by Arkansas governor Thomas S. Drew to the seat vacated by Sevier on March 30, 1848. He resigned from the Senate on April 11, 1853, to serve as a minister to Central America.)
William K. Sebastian (D)	31st (1849–1851)	Solon Borland (D)
William K. Sebastian (D)	32nd (1851–1853)	Solon Borland (D)
William K. Sebastian (D)	33rd (1853–1855)	Solon Borland (D)
William K. Sebastian (D)	33rd (1853–1855)	Robert Ward Johnson (D)
William K. Sebastian (D)	34th (1855–1857)	Robert Ward Johnson (D)
William K. Sebastian (D)	35th (1857–1859)	Robert Ward Johnson (D)
William K. Sebastian (D)	36th (1859–1861)	Robert Ward Johnson (D)
William K. Sebastian (D)	37th (1861–1863)	Charles B. Mitchel (D) (Note: Mitchel was expelled from the Senate on July 11, 1861, on account of Arkansas' secession from the Union.)
vacant (Note: From secession to readmission to the Union, Arkansas did not participate in the Senate. Congressional representation from Arkansas was instead sent to the Confederate States Congress.)	37th (1861–1863)	vacant (Note: Augustus Hill Garland presented credentials as a senator-elect to the 40th United States Congress in 1867 but was not permitted to serve.)
vacant	38th (1863–1865)	vacant
vacant	39th (1865–1867)	vacant
vacant	40th (1867–1869)	vacant
Alexander McDonald (R)	40th (1867–1869)	Benjamin F. Rice (R)
Alexander McDonald (R)	41st (1869–1871)	Benjamin F. Rice (R)
Powell Clayton (R)	42nd (1871–1873)	Benjamin F. Rice (R)
Powell Clayton (R)	43rd (1873–1875)	Stephen W. Dorsey (R)
Powell Clayton (R)	44th (1875–1877)	Stephen W. Dorsey (R)
Augustus H. Garland (D) (Note: Garland served in the Senate until 1885, when president Grover Cleveland appointed him to serve as Attorney General.)	45th (1877–1879)	Stephen W. Dorsey (R)
Augustus H. Garland (D)	46th (1879–1881)	James D. Walker (D)
Augustus H. Garland (D)	47th (1881–1883)	James D. Walker (D)
Augustus H. Garland (D)	48th (1883–1885)	James D. Walker (D)
Augustus H. Garland (D)	49th (1885–1887)	James K. Jones (D)
James H. Berry (D)	49th (1885–1887)	James K. Jones (D)
James H. Berry (D)	50th (1887–1889)	James K. Jones (D)
James H. Berry (D)	51st (1889–1891)	James K. Jones (D)
James H. Berry (D)	52nd (1891–1893)	James K. Jones (D)
James H. Berry (D)	53rd (1893–1895)	James K. Jones (D)
James H. Berry (D)	54th (1895–1897)	James K. Jones (D)
James H. Berry (D)	55th (1897–1899)	James K. Jones (D)
James H. Berry (D)	56th (1899–1901)	James K. Jones (D)
James H. Berry (D)	57th (1901–1903)	James K. Jones (D)
James H. Berry (D)	58th (1903–1905)	James P. Clarke (D) (Note: Clarke died on October 1, 1916, while serving in office and as the president pro tempore of the Senate.)
James H. Berry (D)	59th (1905–1907)	James P. Clarke (D)
Jeff Davis (D) (Note: Davis died in on January 2, 1913, while in office.)	60th (1907–1909)	James P. Clarke (D)
Jeff Davis (D)	61st (1909–1911)	James P. Clarke (D)
Jeff Davis (D)	62nd (1911–1913)	James P. Clarke (D)
John N. Heiskell (D) (Note: Heiskell was appointed by Arkansas governor George Washington Donaghey to the seat vacated by Davis, and served until Senator Kavanaugh was elected to the seat by the Arkansas General Assembly.)	62nd (1911–1913)	James P. Clarke (D)
William M. Kavanaugh (D)	62nd (1911–1913)	James P. Clarke (D)
Joseph T. Robinson (D) (Note: Robinson died on July 14, 1937, while serving as Senate Majority Leader.)	63rd (1913–1915)	James P. Clarke (D)
Joseph T. Robinson (D)	64th (1915–1917)	James P. Clarke (D)
Joseph T. Robinson (D)	64th (1915–1917)	William F. Kirby (D)
Joseph T. Robinson (D)	65th (1917–1919)	William F. Kirby (D)
Joseph T. Robinson (D)	66th (1919–1921)	William F. Kirby (D)
Joseph T. Robinson (D)	67th (1921–1923)	Thaddeus H. Caraway (D) (Note: Caraway died on November 6, 1931, while in office.)
Joseph T. Robinson (D)	68th (1923–1925)	Thaddeus H. Caraway (D)
Joseph T. Robinson (D)	69th (1925–1927)	Thaddeus H. Caraway (D)
Joseph T. Robinson (D)	70th (1927–1929)	Thaddeus H. Caraway (D)
Joseph T. Robinson (D)	71st (1929–1931)	Thaddeus H. Caraway (D)
Joseph T. Robinson (D)	72nd (1931–1933)	Thaddeus H. Caraway (D)
Joseph T. Robinson (D)	72nd (1931–1933)	Hattie Caraway (D)
Joseph T. Robinson (D)	73rd (1933–1935)	Hattie Caraway (D)
Joseph T. Robinson (D)	74th (1935–1937)	Hattie Caraway (D)
Joseph T. Robinson (D)	75th (1937–1939)	Hattie Caraway (D)
John E. Miller (D) (Note: Miller resigned on March 31, 1941, to serve as a judge on the United States District Court for the Western District of Arkansas.)	75th (1937–1939)	Hattie Caraway (D)
John E. Miller (D)	76th (1939–1941)	Hattie Caraway (D)
John E. Miller (D)	77th (1941–1943)	Hattie Caraway (D)
Lloyd Spencer (D)	77th (1941–1943)	Hattie Caraway (D)
John L. McClellan (D) (Note: McClellan died on November 28, 1977, while in office.)	78th (1943–1945)	Hattie Caraway (D)
John L. McClellan (D)	79th (1945–1947)	J. William Fulbright (D) (Note: Fulbright resigned from the Senate on December 31, 1974.)
John L. McClellan (D)	80th (1947–1949)	J. William Fulbright (D)
John L. McClellan (D)	81st (1949–1951)	J. William Fulbright (D)
John L. McClellan (D)	82nd (1951–1953)	J. William Fulbright (D)
John L. McClellan (D)	83rd (1953–1955)	J. William Fulbright (D)
John L. McClellan (D)	84th (1955–1957)	J. William Fulbright (D)
John L. McClellan (D)	85th (1957–1959)	J. William Fulbright (D)
John L. McClellan (D)	86th (1959–1961)	J. William Fulbright (D)
John L. McClellan (D)	87th (1961–1963)	J. William Fulbright (D)
John L. McClellan (D)	88th (1963–1965)	J. William Fulbright (D)
John L. McClellan (D)	89th (1965–1967)	J. William Fulbright (D)
John L. McClellan (D)	90th (1967–1969)	J. William Fulbright (D)
John L. McClellan (D)	91st (1969–1971)	J. William Fulbright (D)
John L. McClellan (D)	92nd (1971–1973)	J. William Fulbright (D)
John L. McClellan (D)	93rd (1973–1975)	J. William Fulbright (D)
John L. McClellan (D)	94th (1975–1977)	Dale Bumpers (D)
John L. McClellan (D)	95th (1977–1979)	Dale Bumpers (D)
Kaneaster Hodges Jr. (D)	95th (1977–1979)	Dale Bumpers (D)
David Pryor (D)	96th (1979–1981)	Dale Bumpers (D)
David Pryor (D)	97th (1981–1983)	Dale Bumpers (D)
David Pryor (D)	98th (1983–1985)	Dale Bumpers (D)
David Pryor (D)	99th (1985–1987)	Dale Bumpers (D)
David Pryor (D)	100th (1987–1989)	Dale Bumpers (D)
David Pryor (D)	101st (1989–1991)	Dale Bumpers (D)
David Pryor (D)	102nd (1991–1993)	Dale Bumpers (D)
David Pryor (D)	103rd (1993–1995)	Dale Bumpers (D)
David Pryor (D)	104th (1995–1997)	Dale Bumpers (D)
Tim Hutchinson (R)	105th (1997–1999)	Dale Bumpers (D)
Tim Hutchinson (R)	106th (1999–2001)	Blanche Lincoln (D)
Tim Hutchinson (R)	107th (2001–2003)	Blanche Lincoln (D)
Mark Pryor (D)	108th (2003–2005)	Blanche Lincoln (D)
Mark Pryor (D)	109th (2005–2007)	Blanche Lincoln (D)
Mark Pryor (D)	110th (2007–2009)	Blanche Lincoln (D)
Mark Pryor (D)	111th (2009–2011)	Blanche Lincoln (D)
Mark Pryor (D)	112th (2011–2013)	John Boozman (R)
Mark Pryor (D)	113th (2013–2015)	John Boozman (R)
Tom Cotton (R)	114th (2015–2017)	John Boozman (R)
Tom Cotton (R)	115th (2017–2019)	John Boozman (R)
Tom Cotton (R)	116th (2019–2021)	John Boozman (R)
Tom Cotton (R)	117th (2021–2023)	John Boozman (R)
Tom Cotton (R)	118th (2023–2025)	John Boozman (R)
Tom Cotton (R)	119th (2025–2027)	John Boozman (R)
Tom Cotton (R)	120th (2027–2029)	John Boozman (R)

== United States House of Representatives ==
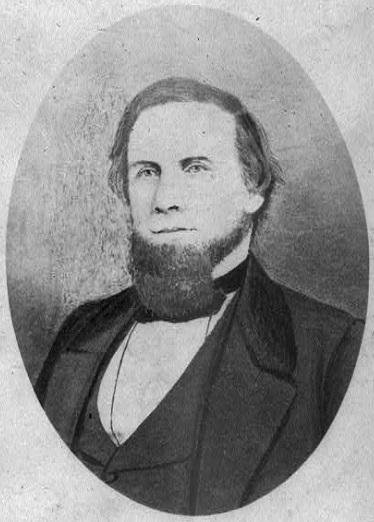
Albert Rust, who served both in the House of Representatives and, later, in the Confederate States Congress

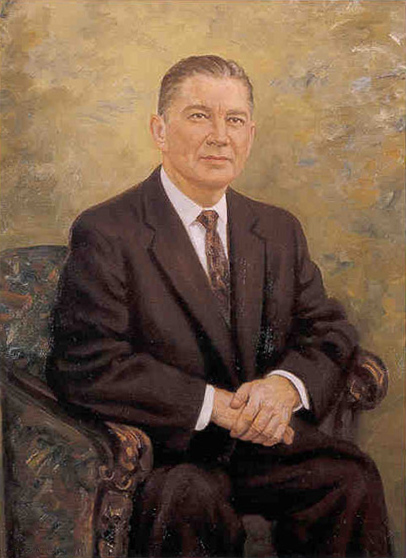
Wilbur Mills, who chaired the House Ways and Means Committee for 20 years, and was sometimes referred to as "the most powerful man in Congress"

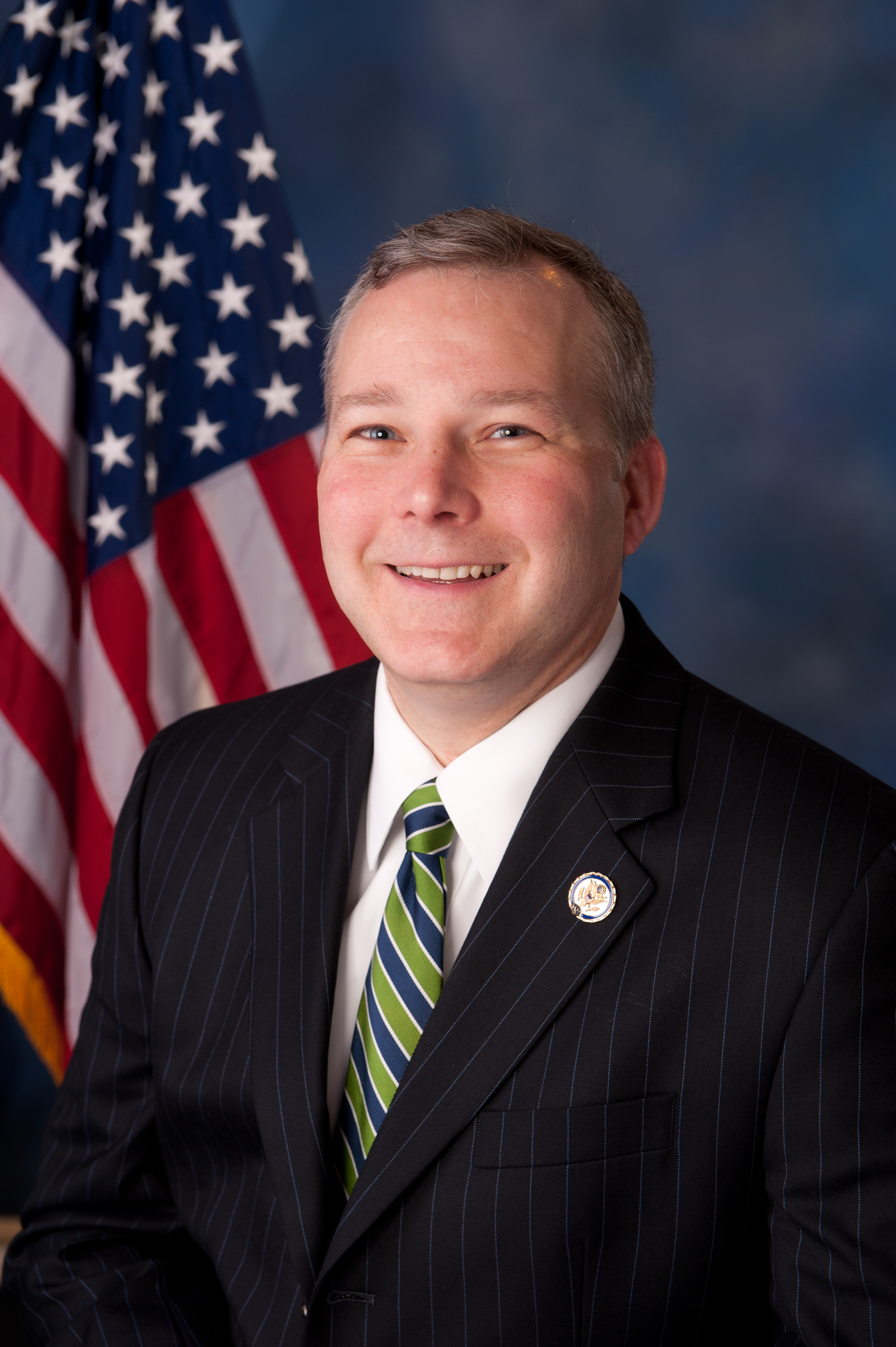
Tim Griffin, who became Lieutenant Governor of Arkansas after two terms representing Arkansas in the House

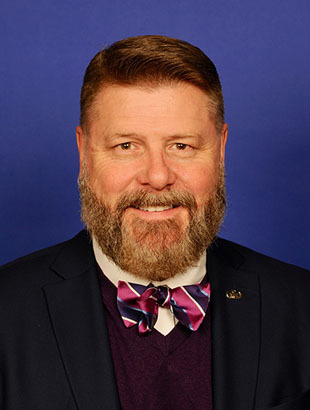
Rick Crawford, a current member of the House from Arkansas, is currently serving as the chairman of the House Intelligence Committee

Arkansas has been represented in the House since 1819, when James Woodson Bates was sent to Congress as a delegate from Arkansas Territory, except for during the American Civil War. Because Arkansas seceded from the Union and joined the Confederacy during the war, its representatives were sent to the Confederate States Congress instead. Robert Ward Johnson, who previously served as both a representative and senator from Arkansas, and Albert Rust, who was a sitting member of Congress from Arkansas during secession, both later served in the Confederate Congress.

Many representatives from Arkansas have held leadership roles in the House. William A. Oldfield served as the House Minority Whip for the Democratic Party. Wilbur Mills was elected in 1938, serving as the powerful chairman of the House Ways and Means Committee from 1957 until his retirement in 1977, following scandals related to his alcoholism and an affair with stripper Fanne Foxe. Some representatives have gone on to serve in other political and judicial offices after their time in Congress, including Thomas C. McRae, who later served as governor of Arkansas; Tim Griffin, who later served as lieutenant governor of Arkansas; Asa Hutchinson, who later became governor of Arkansas and led both the Drug Enforcement Administration and part of the Department of Homeland Security; and Ray Thornton, who later served on the Arkansas Supreme Court.

Each district uses a popular vote to elect a member of Arkansas's delegation in the House of Representatives. Districts are redrawn every ten years, after data from the US Census is collected. While it has sent varying numbers of representatives to Congress over the years, Arkansas has sent four representatives to the House since 1963, following the 1960 United States census. Arkansas is currently represented in the House by four Republicans: Rick Crawford, French Hill, Steve Womack, and Bruce Westerman.

=== Historical timeline ===
Democratic (D)
Democratic-Republican (DR)
Independent (I)
Jacksonian (J)
Liberal Republican (LR)
Republican (R)
Socialist Labor Party (SL)
Whig (W)

==== 1819–1836: 1 non-voting delegate ====
The Arkansas Territory was created on March 2, 1819, and it sent a non-voting delegate to the House.

Delegates to the House of Representatives from Arkansas Territory from 1819 to 1837
Congress	Delegate from Territory's at-large district
16th (1819–1821)	James Woodson Bates (I)
17th (1821–1823)	James Woodson Bates (I)
18th (1823–1825)	Henry W. Conway (DR) (Note: Conway died on November 9, 1827, while in office.)
19th (1825–1827)	Henry W. Conway (DR)
20th (1827–1829)	Henry W. Conway (DR)
20th (1827–1829)	Ambrose H. Sevier (J)
21st (1829–1831)	Ambrose H. Sevier (J)
22nd (1831–1833)	Ambrose H. Sevier (J)
23rd (1833–1835)	Ambrose H. Sevier (J)
24th (1835–1837)	Ambrose H. Sevier (J)

==== 1836–1853: 1 seat ====
Following statehood on June 15, 1836, Arkansas had one seat in the House.

Members of the House of Representatives from Arkansas from 1835 to 1853
Congress	At-large district
24th (1835–1837)	Archibald Yell (J)
25th (1837–1839)	Archibald Yell (D)
26th (1839–1841)	Edward Cross (D)
27th (1841–1843)	Edward Cross (D)
28th (1843–1845)	Edward Cross (D)
29th (1845–1847)	Archibald Yell (D) (Note: Yell left fought in the Mexican-American War without resigning, and was killed in the Battle of Buena Vista on February 22, 1847, while in office.)
29th (1845–1847)	Thomas Willoughby Newton (W)
30th (1847–1849)	Robert Ward Johnson (D)
31st (1849–1851)	Robert Ward Johnson (D)
32nd (1851–1853)	Robert Ward Johnson (D)

==== 1853–1863: 2 seats ====
Following the 1850 census, Arkansas was apportioned two seats in the House.

Members of the House of Representatives from Arkansas from 1853 to 1863
Congress	1st district	2nd district
33rd (1853–1855)	Alfred B. Greenwood (D)	Edward A. Warren (D)
34th (1855–1857)	Alfred B. Greenwood (D)	Albert Rust (D)
35th (1857–1859)	Alfred B. Greenwood (D)	Edward A. Warren (D)
36th (1859–1861)	Thomas C. Hindman (D) (Note: Hindman was re-elected to the 37th Congress, but chose not to take his seat. He resigned from Congress upon Arkansas' secession from the Union.)	Albert Rust (D)
37th (1861–1863)	vacant during the Civil War (Note: Arkansas' House seats were vacant during the 37th, 38th, and 39th Congresses. Congressional representation was instead sent to the Confederate States Congress.)	

==== 1863–1873: 3 seats ====
Following the 1860 census, Arkansas was apportioned three seats.

Members of the House of Representatives from Arkansas from 1863 to 1873
Congress	1st district	2nd district	3rd district
38–39th (1863–1865)	vacant during the Civil War and Reconstruction (Note: James M. Johnson, T. M. Jacks, and Anthony A. C. Rogers were elected to the 38th Congress but were not permitted to serve because Arkansas had not yet been re-admitted to the Union.)		
40th (1867–1869)	vacant during the Civil War and Reconstruction		
40th (1867–1869)	Logan H. Roots (R)	James M. Hinds (R) (Note: Hinds was assassinated on October 22, 1868, while in office.)	Thomas Boles (R)
40th (1867–1869)	Logan H. Roots (R)	James T. Elliott (R)	Thomas Boles (R)
41st (1869–1871)	Logan H. Roots (R)	Anthony A. C. Rogers (D)	Thomas Boles (R)
42nd (1871–1873)	James M. Hanks (D)	Oliver P. Snyder (R)	John Edwards (LR) (Note: Edwards served in Congress until February 9, 1872, when his opponent, Thomas Boles, successfully challenged the election.)
42nd (1871–1873)	James M. Hanks (D)	Oliver P. Snyder (R)	Thomas Boles (R)

==== 1873–1883: 4 seats ====
Following the 1870 census, Arkansas was apportioned four seats.

Members of the House of Representatives from Arkansas from 1873 to 1875
Congress	1st district	2nd district	3rd district	At-large
43rd (1873–1875)	Asa Hodges (R)	Oliver P. Snyder (R)	William W. Wilshire (R) (Note: Wilshire served until Representative Thomas M. Gunter successfully challenged the election on June 17, 1874.)	William J. Hynes (LR)
43rd (1873–1875)	Asa Hodges (R)	Oliver P. Snyder (R)	Thomas M. Gunter (D)	William J. Hynes (LR)

Members of the House of Representatives from Arkansas from 1875 to 1883
Congress	1st district	2nd district	3rd district	4th district
44th (1875–1877)	Lucien C. Gause (D)	William F. Slemons (D)	William W. Wilshire (D)	Thomas M. Gunter (D)
45th (1877–1879)	Lucien C. Gause (D)	William F. Slemons (D)	Jordan E. Cravens (D)	Thomas M. Gunter (D)
46th (1879–1881)	Poindexter Dunn (D)	William F. Slemons (D)	Jordan E. Cravens (D)	Thomas M. Gunter (D)
47th (1881–1883)	Poindexter Dunn (D)	James K. Jones (D)	Jordan E. Cravens (D)	Thomas M. Gunter (D)

==== 1883–1893: 5 seats ====
Following the 1880 census, Arkansas was apportioned five seats.

Members of the House of Representatives from Arkansas from 1883 to 1885
Congress	1st district	2nd district	3rd district	4th district	At-large
48th (1883–1885)	Poindexter Dunn (D)	James K. Jones (D)	John Henry Rogers (D)	Samuel W. Peel (D)	Clifton R. Breckinridge (D)

Members of the House of Representatives from Arkansas from 1885 to 1893
Congress	1st district	2nd district	3rd district	4th district	5th district
49th (1885–1887)	Poindexter Dunn (D)	Clifton R. Breckinridge (D)	vacant (Note: McRae was elected to fill the vacancy caused by James K. Jones, who had been elected to the next term, but resigned before the 49th Congress, having been elected to the United States Senate.)	John Henry Rogers (D)	Samuel W. Peel (D)
49th (1885–1887)	Poindexter Dunn (D)	Clifton R. Breckinridge (D)	Thomas C. McRae (D)	John Henry Rogers (D)	Samuel W. Peel (D)
50th (1887–1889)	Poindexter Dunn (D)	Clifton R. Breckinridge (D)	Thomas C. McRae (D)	John Henry Rogers (D)	Samuel W. Peel (D)
51st (1889–1891)	William H. Cate (D) (Note: Cate was seated in the House until Featherstone successfully challenged the election, and was seated in Cate's place.)	Clifton R. Breckinridge (D)	Thomas C. McRae (D)	John Henry Rogers (D)	Samuel W. Peel (D)
51st (1889–1891)	Lewis Featherstone (SL)	vacant (Note: Breckinridge was initially declared elected to the 51st United States Congress and took his seat. John M. Clayton eventually successfully challenged the election, but was assassinated before the results of the challenge were announced. Thus, the House declared the seat vacant. Breckinridge was then re-elected to finish the term.)	Thomas C. McRae (D)	John Henry Rogers (D)	Samuel W. Peel (D)
51st (1889–1891)	Lewis Featherstone (SL)	Clifton R. Breckinridge (D)	Thomas C. McRae (D)	John Henry Rogers (D)	Samuel W. Peel (D)
52nd (1891–1893)	William H. Cate (D)	Clifton R. Breckinridge (D)	Thomas C. McRae (D)	William L. Terry (D)	Samuel W. Peel (D)

==== 1893–1903: 6 seats ====
Following the 1890 census, Arkansas was apportioned six seats.

Members of the House of Representatives from Arkansas from 1893 to 1903
Congress	1st district	2nd district	3rd district	4th district	5th district	6th district
53rd (1893–1895)	Philip D. McCulloch Jr. (D)	Clifton R. Breckinridge (D) (Note: Breckinridge resigned from the House on August 14, 1894, having been appointed Minister to Russia.)	Thomas C. McRae (D)	William L. Terry (D)	Hugh A. Dinsmore (D)	Robert Neill (D)
53rd (1893–1895)	Philip D. McCulloch Jr. (D)	John S. Little (D)	Thomas C. McRae (D)	William L. Terry (D)	Hugh A. Dinsmore (D)	Robert Neill (D)
54th (1895–1897)	Philip D. McCulloch Jr. (D)	John S. Little (D)	Thomas C. McRae (D)	William L. Terry (D)	Hugh A. Dinsmore (D)	Robert Neill (D)
55th (1897–1899)	Philip D. McCulloch Jr. (D)	John S. Little (D)	Thomas C. McRae (D)	William L. Terry (D)	Hugh A. Dinsmore (D)	Stephen; Brundidge Jr. (D)
56th (1899–1901)	Philip D. McCulloch Jr. (D)	John S. Little (D)	Thomas C. McRae (D)	William L. Terry (D)	Hugh A. Dinsmore (D)	Stephen; Brundidge Jr. (D)
57th (1901–1903)	Philip D. McCulloch Jr. (D)	John S. Little (D)	Thomas C. McRae (D)	Charles C. Reid (D)	Hugh A. Dinsmore (D)	Stephen; Brundidge Jr. (D)

==== 1903–1953: 7 seats ====
Following the 1900 census, Arkansas was apportioned seven seats.

Members of the House of Representatives from Arkansas from 1903 to 1953
Congress	1st district	2nd district	3rd district	4th district	5th district	6th district	7th district
58th (1903–1905)	Robert B. Macon (D)	Stephen; Brundidge Jr. (D)	Hugh A. Dinsmore (D)	John S. Little (D)	Charles C. Reid (D)	Joseph T. Robinson (D) (Note: Robinson resigned his seat in the House on January 14, 1913, having been elected governor of Arkansas.)	Robert M. Wallace (D)
59th (1905–1907)	Robert B. Macon (D)	Stephen; Brundidge Jr. (D)	John C. Floyd (D)	John S. Little (D)	Charles C. Reid (D)	Joseph T. Robinson (D)	Robert M. Wallace (D)
60th (1907–1909)	Robert B. Macon (D)	Stephen; Brundidge Jr. (D)	John C. Floyd (D)	William B. Cravens (D)	Charles C. Reid (D)	Joseph T. Robinson (D)	Robert M. Wallace (D)
61st (1909–1911)	Robert B. Macon (D)	William A. Oldfield (D) (Note: Oldfield died on November 19, 1928, while in office.)	John C. Floyd (D)	William B. Cravens (D)	Charles C. Reid (D)	Joseph T. Robinson (D)	Robert M. Wallace (D)
62nd (1911–1913)	Robert B. Macon (D)	William A. Oldfield (D)	John C. Floyd (D)	William B. Cravens (D)	Henderson M. Jacoway (D)	Joseph T. Robinson (D)	William S. Goodwin (D)
62nd (1911–1913)	Robert B. Macon (D)	William A. Oldfield (D)	John C. Floyd (D)	William B. Cravens (D)	Henderson M. Jacoway (D)	Samuel M. Taylor (D) (Note: Taylor died on September 13, 1921, while in office.)	William S. Goodwin (D)
63rd (1913–1915)	Thaddeus H. Caraway (D)	William A. Oldfield (D)	John C. Floyd (D)	Otis Wingo (D) (Note: Wingo died on October 21, 1930, while in office.)	Henderson M. Jacoway (D)	Samuel M. Taylor (D)	William S. Goodwin (D)
64th (1915–1917)	Thaddeus H. Caraway (D)	William A. Oldfield (D)	John N. Tillman (D)	Otis Wingo (D)	Henderson M. Jacoway (D)	Samuel M. Taylor (D)	William S. Goodwin (D)
65th (1917–1919)	Thaddeus H. Caraway (D)	William A. Oldfield (D)	John N. Tillman (D)	Otis Wingo (D)	Henderson M. Jacoway (D)	Samuel M. Taylor (D)	William S. Goodwin (D)
66th (1919–1921)	Thaddeus H. Caraway (D)	William A. Oldfield (D)	John N. Tillman (D)	Otis Wingo (D)	Henderson M. Jacoway (D)	Samuel M. Taylor (D)	William S. Goodwin (D)
67th (1921–1923)	William J. Driver (D)	William A. Oldfield (D)	John N. Tillman (D)	Otis Wingo (D)	Henderson M. Jacoway (D)	Samuel M. Taylor (D)	Tilman B. Parks (D)
67th (1921–1923)	William J. Driver (D)	William A. Oldfield (D)	John N. Tillman (D)	Otis Wingo (D)	Henderson M. Jacoway (D)	Chester W. Taylor (D)	Tilman B. Parks (D)
68th (1923–1925)	William J. Driver (D)	William A. Oldfield (D)	John N. Tillman (D)	Otis Wingo (D)	Heartsill Ragon (D) (Note: Ragon resigned from the House on June 15, 1933, having been appointed a judge on the United States District Court for the Western District of Arkansas.)	Lewis E. Sawyer (D) (Note: Sawyer died on May 5, 1923, while in office.)	Tilman B. Parks (D)
68th (1923–1925)	William J. Driver (D)	William A. Oldfield (D)	John N. Tillman (D)	Otis Wingo (D)	Heartsill Ragon (D)	James B. Reed (D)	Tilman B. Parks (D)
69th (1925–1927)	William J. Driver (D)	William A. Oldfield (D)	John N. Tillman (D)	Otis Wingo (D)	Heartsill Ragon (D)	James B. Reed (D)	Tilman B. Parks (D)
70th (1927–1929)	William J. Driver (D)	William A. Oldfield (D)	John N. Tillman (D)	Otis Wingo (D)	Heartsill Ragon (D)	James B. Reed (D)	Tilman B. Parks (D)
70th (1927–1929)	William J. Driver (D)	Pearl P. Oldfield (D) (Note: Elected to fill the vacancy caused by the previous representative's death before the term began.)	John N. Tillman (D)	Otis Wingo (D)	Heartsill Ragon (D)	James B. Reed (D)	Tilman B. Parks (D)
71st (1929–1931)	William J. Driver (D)	Pearl P. Oldfield (D)	Claude A. Fuller (D)	Otis Wingo (D)	Heartsill Ragon (D)	D. D. Glover (D)	Tilman B. Parks (D)
71st (1929–1931)	William J. Driver (D)	Pearl P. Oldfield (D)	Claude A. Fuller (D)	Effiegene Wingo (D)	Heartsill Ragon (D)	D. D. Glover (D)	Tilman B. Parks (D)
72nd (1931–1933)	William J. Driver (D)	John E. Miller (D)	Claude A. Fuller (D)	Effiegene Wingo (D)	Heartsill Ragon (D)	D. D. Glover (D)	Tilman B. Parks (D)
73rd (1933–1935)	William J. Driver (D)	John E. Miller (D)	Claude A. Fuller (D)	William B. Cravens (D) (Note: Cravens died on January 13, 1939, while in office.)	Heartsill Ragon (D)	D. D. Glover (D)	Tilman B. Parks (D)
73rd (1933–1935)	William J. Driver (D)	John E. Miller (D)	Claude A. Fuller (D)	William B. Cravens (D)	David D. Terry (D)	D. D. Glover (D)	Tilman B. Parks (D)
74th (1935–1937)	William J. Driver (D)	John E. Miller (D)	Claude A. Fuller (D)	William B. Cravens (D)	David D. Terry (D)	John L. McClellan (D)	Tilman B. Parks (D)
75th (1937–1939)	William J. Driver (D)	John E. Miller (D)	Claude A. Fuller (D)	William B. Cravens (D)	David D. Terry (D)	John L. McClellan (D)	Wade H. Kitchens (D)
76th (1939–1941)	Ezekiel C. Gathings (D)	Wilbur Mills (D)	Clyde T. Ellis (D)	William B. Cravens (D)	David D. Terry (D)	William F. Norrell (D)	Wade H. Kitchens (D)
76th (1939–1941)	Ezekiel C. Gathings (D)	Wilbur Mills (D)	Clyde T. Ellis (D)	William Fadjo; Cravens (D)	David D. Terry (D)	William F. Norrell (D)	Wade H. Kitchens (D)
77th (1941–1943)	Ezekiel C. Gathings (D)	Wilbur Mills (D)	Clyde T. Ellis (D)	William Fadjo; Cravens (D)	David D. Terry (D)	William F. Norrell (D)	Oren Harris (D)
78th (1943–1945)	Ezekiel C. Gathings (D)	Wilbur Mills (D)	J. William Fulbright (D)	William Fadjo; Cravens (D)	Brooks Hays (D)	William F. Norrell (D)	Oren Harris (D)
79th (1945–1947)	Ezekiel C. Gathings (D)	Wilbur Mills (D)	James William; Trimble (D)	William Fadjo; Cravens (D)	Brooks Hays (D)	William F. Norrell (D)	Oren Harris (D)
80th (1947–1949)	Ezekiel C. Gathings (D)	Wilbur Mills (D)	James William; Trimble (D)	William Fadjo; Cravens (D)	Brooks Hays (D)	William F. Norrell (D)	Oren Harris (D)
81st (1949–1951)	Ezekiel C. Gathings (D)	Wilbur Mills (D)	James William; Trimble (D)	Boyd Tackett (D)	Brooks Hays (D)	William F. Norrell (D)	Oren Harris (D)
82nd (1951–1953)	Ezekiel C. Gathings (D)	Wilbur Mills (D)	James William; Trimble (D)	Boyd Tackett (D)	Brooks Hays (D)	William F. Norrell (D)	Oren Harris (D)

==== 1953–1963: 6 seats ====
Following the 1950 census, Arkansas was apportioned six seats.

Members of the House of Representatives from Arkansas from 1953 to 1963
Congress	1st district	2nd district	3rd district	4th district	5th district	6th district
83rd (1953–1955)	Ezekiel C. Gathings (D)	Wilbur Mills (D)	James William; Trimble (D)	Oren Harris (D)	Brooks Hays (D)	William F. Norrell (D) (Note: Norrell died on February 15, 1964, while in office.)
84th (1955–1957)	Ezekiel C. Gathings (D)	Wilbur Mills (D)	James William; Trimble (D)	Oren Harris (D)	Brooks Hays (D)	William F. Norrell (D)
85th (1957–1959)	Ezekiel C. Gathings (D)	Wilbur Mills (D)	James William; Trimble (D)	Oren Harris (D)	Brooks Hays (D)	William F. Norrell (D)
86th (1959–1961)	Ezekiel C. Gathings (D)	Wilbur Mills (D)	James William; Trimble (D)	Oren Harris (D)	Dale Alford (D)	William F. Norrell (D)
87th (1961–1963)	Ezekiel C. Gathings (D)	Wilbur Mills (D)	James William; Trimble (D)	Oren Harris (D)	Dale Alford (D)	William F. Norrell (D)
87th (1961–1963)	Ezekiel C. Gathings (D)	Wilbur Mills (D)	James William; Trimble (D)	Oren Harris (D)	Dale Alford (D)	Catherine D. Norrell (D)

==== 1963–present: 4 seats ====
Since the 1960 census, Arkansas has been apportioned four seats.

Members of the House of Representatives from Arkansas from 1963 to present
Congress	1st district	2nd district	3rd district	4th district
88th (1963–1965)	Ezekiel C. Gathings (D)	Wilbur Mills (D)	James William; Trimble (D)	Oren Harris (D) (Note: Harris resigned from the House to become a judge for the United States District Court for the Eastern District of Arkansas and United States District Court for the Western District of Arkansas on February 2, 1966.)
89th (1965–1967)	Ezekiel C. Gathings (D)	Wilbur Mills (D)	James William; Trimble (D)	Oren Harris (D)
89th (1965–1967)	Ezekiel C. Gathings (D)	Wilbur Mills (D)	James William; Trimble (D)	David Pryor (D)
90th (1967–1969)	Ezekiel C. Gathings (D)	Wilbur Mills (D)	John Paul; Hammerschmidt (R)	David Pryor (D)
91st (1969–1971)	Bill Alexander (D)	Wilbur Mills (D)	John Paul; Hammerschmidt (R)	David Pryor (D)
92nd (1971–1973)	Bill Alexander (D)	Wilbur Mills (D)	John Paul; Hammerschmidt (R)	David Pryor (D)
93rd (1973–1975)	Bill Alexander (D)	Wilbur Mills (D)	John Paul; Hammerschmidt (R)	Ray Thornton (D)
94th (1975–1977)	Bill Alexander (D)	Wilbur Mills (D)	John Paul; Hammerschmidt (R)	Ray Thornton (D)
95th (1977–1979)	Bill Alexander (D)	Jim Guy Tucker (D)	John Paul; Hammerschmidt (R)	Ray Thornton (D)
96th (1979–1981)	Bill Alexander (D)	Ed Bethune (R)	John Paul; Hammerschmidt (R)	Beryl Anthony Jr. (D)
97th (1981–1983)	Bill Alexander (D)	Ed Bethune (R)	John Paul; Hammerschmidt (R)	Beryl Anthony Jr. (D)
98th (1983–1985)	Bill Alexander (D)	Ed Bethune (R)	John Paul; Hammerschmidt (R)	Beryl Anthony Jr. (D)
99th (1985–1987)	Bill Alexander (D)	Tommy F. Robinson (D)	John Paul; Hammerschmidt (R)	Beryl Anthony Jr. (D)
100th (1987–1989)	Bill Alexander (D)	Tommy F. Robinson (D)	John Paul; Hammerschmidt (R)	Beryl Anthony Jr. (D)
101st (1989–1991)	Bill Alexander (D)	Tommy F. Robinson (D)	John Paul; Hammerschmidt (R)	Beryl Anthony Jr. (D)
101st (1989–1991)	Bill Alexander (D)	Tommy F. Robinson (R)	John Paul; Hammerschmidt (R)	Beryl Anthony Jr. (D)
102nd (1991–1993)	Bill Alexander (D)	Ray Thornton (D)	John Paul; Hammerschmidt (R)	Beryl Anthony Jr. (D)
103rd (1993–1995)	Blanche Lincoln (D)	Ray Thornton (D)	Tim Hutchinson (R)	Jay Dickey (R)
104th (1995–1997)	Blanche Lincoln (D)	Ray Thornton (D)	Tim Hutchinson (R)	Jay Dickey (R)
105th (1997–1999)	Marion Berry (D)	Vic Snyder (D)	Asa Hutchinson (R) (Note: Hutchinson resigned from the House to serve as the Administrator of the Drug Enforcement Administration on August 6, 2001.)	Jay Dickey (R)
106th (1999–2001)	Marion Berry (D)	Vic Snyder (D)	Asa Hutchinson (R)	Jay Dickey (R)
107th (2001–2003)	Marion Berry (D)	Vic Snyder (D)	Asa Hutchinson (R)	Mike Ross (D)
107th (2001–2003)	Marion Berry (D)	Vic Snyder (D)	John Boozman (R)	Mike Ross (D)
108th (2003–2005)	Marion Berry (D)	Vic Snyder (D)	John Boozman (R)	Mike Ross (D)
109th (2005–2007)	Marion Berry (D)	Vic Snyder (D)	John Boozman (R)	Mike Ross (D)
110th (2007–2009)	Marion Berry (D)	Vic Snyder (D)	John Boozman (R)	Mike Ross (D)
111th (2009–2011)	Marion Berry (D)	Vic Snyder (D)	John Boozman (R)	Mike Ross (D)
112th (2011–2013)	Rick Crawford (R)	Tim Griffin (R)	Steve Womack (R)	Mike Ross (D)
113th (2013–2015)	Rick Crawford (R)	Tim Griffin (R)	Steve Womack (R)	Tom Cotton (R)
114th (2015–2017)	Rick Crawford (R)	French Hill (R)	Steve Womack (R)	Bruce Westerman (R)
115th (2017–2019)	Rick Crawford (R)	French Hill (R)	Steve Womack (R)	Bruce Westerman (R)
116th (2019–2021)	Rick Crawford (R)	French Hill (R)	Steve Womack (R)	Bruce Westerman (R)
117th (2021–2023)	Rick Crawford (R)	French Hill (R)	Steve Womack (R)	Bruce Westerman (R)
118th (2023–2025)	Rick Crawford (R)	French Hill (R)	Steve Womack (R)	Bruce Westerman (R)
119th (2025–2027)	Rick Crawford (R)	French Hill (R)	Steve Womack (R)	Bruce Westerman (R)
120th (2027–2028)	Rick Crawford (R)	French Hill (R)	Steve Womack (R)	Bruce Westerman (R)

== See also ==
- List of United States congressional districts
- Arkansas's congressional districts
- Political party strength in Arkansas
