= List of United States representatives from Arkansas =

The following is an alphabetical list of United States representatives from the state of Arkansas. For chronological tables of members of both houses of the United States Congress from the state (through the present day), see Arkansas's congressional delegations.

== Current members ==
- 1st district – Rick Crawford (R) (since 2011)
- 2nd district – French Hill (R) (since 2015)
- 3rd district – Steve Womack (R) (since 2011)
- 4th district – Bruce Westerman (R) (since 2015)

== List of representatives ==
Representative	Years	Party	District	Notes
William Vollie Alexander Jr.	January 3, 1969 – January 3, 1993	Democratic	1st	Elected in 1968. Lost renomination to Lincoln.
Dale Alford	January 3, 1959 – January 3, 1963	Democratic	5th	Elected in 1958 (write-in). Retired to run for governor.
Beryl Anthony Jr.	January 3, 1979 – January 3, 1993	Democratic	4th	Elected in 1978. Lost renomination to Bill McCuen.
James Woodson Bates	December 21, 1819 – March 3, 1823	None	Territory	Elected in 1819. Lost re-election to Conway.
Marion Berry	January 3, 1997 – January 3, 2011	Democratic	1st	Elected in 1996. Retired.
Ed Bethune	January 3, 1979 – January 3, 1985	Republican	2nd	Re-elected in 1978. Retired.
Thomas Boles	June 22, 1868 – March 3, 1871	Republican	3rd	Elected in 1868 to finish vacant term. Lost re-election to Edwards.
Thomas Boles	February 9, 1872 – March 3, 1873	Republican	3rd	Successfully contested Edwards's election. Retired.
John Boozman	November 20, 2001 – January 3, 2011	Republican	3rd	Elected to finish Hutchinson's term. Retired to run for U.S. senator.
Clifton R. Breckinridge	March 4, 1883 – March 3, 1885	Democratic	At-large	Elected in 1882. Redistricted to the 2nd district.
Clifton R. Breckinridge	March 4, 1885 – September 5, 1890	Democratic	2nd	Redistricted from the at-large district and re-elected in 1884. Lost contested election to Clayton.
Clifton R. Breckinridge	November 4, 1890 – August 14, 1894	Democratic	2nd	Elected after John M. Clayton was assassinated while contest was pending. Resigned to become U.S. Minister to Russia.
Stephen Brundidge Jr.	March 4, 1897 – March 3, 1903	Democratic	6th	Elected in 1896. Redistricted to the 2nd district.
Stephen Brundidge Jr.	March 4, 1903 – March 3, 1909	Democratic	2nd	Redistricted from the 6th district and re-elected in 1902. Retired to run for governor.
Thaddeus H. Caraway	March 4, 1913 – March 3, 1921	Democratic	1st	Elected in 1912. Retired to run for U.S. senator.
William H. Cate	March 4, 1889 – March 5, 1890	Democratic	1st	Elected in 1888. Lost contested election to Featherstone.
William H. Cate	March 4, 1891 – March 3, 1893	Democratic	1st	Elected in 1890. Retired.
Henry Wharton Conway	March 4, 1823 – November 9, 1827	None	Territory	Elected in 1823. Died.
Tom Cotton	January 3, 2013 – January 3, 2015	Republican	4th	Elected in 2012. Retired to run for U.S. Senator.
Jordan E. Cravens	March 4, 1877 – March 3, 1879	Independent Democratic	3rd	Elected in 1876. Joined Democratic Party.
Jordan E. Cravens	March 4, 1879 – March 3, 1883	Democratic	3rd	Re-elected in 1878 as a Democrat. Lost renomination to Rogers.
William B. Cravens	March 4, 1907 – March 3, 1913	Democratic	4th	Elected in 1906. Retired.
William B. Cravens	March 4, 1933 – January 3, 1939	Democratic	4th	Elected in 1932. Died.
William Fadjo Cravens	September 12, 1939 – January 3, 1949	Democratic	4th	Elected to finish his father's term. Retired.
Rick Crawford	January 3, 2011 – present	Republican	1st	Elected in 2010. Incumbent.
Edward Cross	March 4, 1839 – March 3, 1845	Democratic	At-large	Elected in 1838. Retired.
Jay Dickey	January 3, 1993 – January 3, 2001	Republican	4th	Elected in 1992. Lost re-election to Ross.
Hugh A. Dinsmore	March 4, 1893 – March 3, 1903	Democratic	5th	Elected in 1892. Redistricted to the 3rd district.
Hugh A. Dinsmore	March 4, 1903 – March 3, 1905	Democratic	3rd	Redistricted from the 5th district and re-elected in 1902. Lost renomination to Floyd.
William J. Driver	March 4, 1921 – January 3, 1939	Democratic	1st	Elected in 1920. Lost renomination to Gathings.
Poindexter Dunn	March 4, 1879 – March 3, 1889	Democratic	1st	Elected in 1878. Retired.
John Edwards	March 4, 1871 – February __, 1872	Liberal Republican	3rd	Elected in 1870. Lost contested election to Boles.
James T. Elliott	January 13, 1869 – March 3, 1869	Republican	2nd	Elected to finish Hinds's term. Retired.
Clyde T. Ellis	January 3, 1939 – January 3, 1943	Democratic	3rd	Elected in 1938. Retired to run for U.S. senator.
Lewis P. Featherstone	March 5, 1890 – March 3, 1891	Union Labor	1st	Successfully contested Cate's 1888 election. Lost re-election to Cate.
John C. Floyd	March 4, 1905 – March 3, 1915	Democratic	3rd	Elected in 1904. Retired.
J. William Fulbright	January 3, 1943 – January 3, 1945	Democratic	3rd	Elected in 1942. Retired to run for U.S. senator.
Claude A. Fuller	March 4, 1929 – January 3, 1939	Democratic	3rd	Elected in 1928. Lost renomination to Ellis.
Ezekiel C. Gathings	January 3, 1939 – January 3, 1969	Democratic	1st	Elected in 1938. Retired.
Lucien C. Gause	March 4, 1875 – March 3, 1879	Democratic	1st	Elected in 1874. Retired.
David Delano Glover	March 4, 1929 – January 3, 1935	Democratic	6th	Elected in 1928. Lost renomination to McClellan.
William S. Goodwin	March 4, 1911 – March 3, 1921	Democratic	7th	Elected in 1910. Lost renomination to Parks.
Alfred B. Greenwood	March 4, 1853 – March 3, 1859	Democratic	1st	Elected in 1853. Retired.
Timothy Griffin	January 3, 2011 – January 3, 2015	Republican	2nd	Elected in 2010. Retired to run for Lieutenant Governor of Arkansas.
Thomas M. Gunter	June 16, 1874 – March 3, 1875	Democratic	3rd	Successfully contested Wilshire's election. Redistricted to the 4th district.
Thomas M. Gunter	March 4, 1875 – March 3, 1883	Democratic	4th	Redistricted from the 3rd district and re-elected in 1874. Retired.
John Paul Hammerschmidt	January 3, 1967 – January 3, 1993	Republican	3rd	Elected in 1966. Retired.
James M. Hanks	March 4, 1871 – March 3, 1873	Democratic	1st	Elected in 1870. Retired.
Oren Harris	January 3, 1941 – January 3, 1953	Democratic	7th	Elected in 1940. Redistricted to the 4th district.
Oren Harris	January 3, 1953 – February 2, 1966	Democratic	4th	Redistricted from the 7th district and re-elected in 1952. Resigned to become US District judge for the Eastern and Western District of Arkansas.
Brooks Hays	January 3, 1943 – January 3, 1959	Democratic	5th	Elected in 1942. Lost re-election to Alford (write-in).
French Hill	January 3, 2015 – present	Republican	2nd	Elected in 2014. Incumbent.
Thomas C. Hindman	March 4, 1859 – March 3, 1861	Democratic	1st	Elected in 1858. Re-elected in 1860 but resigned due to Civil War.
James M. Hinds	July 22, 1868 – October 22, 1868	Republican	2nd	Elected in 1868 to vacant finish term. Died.
Asa Hodges	March 4, 1873 – March 3, 1875	Republican	1st	Elected in 1872. Retired.
Asa Hutchinson	January 3, 1997 – August 6, 2001	Republican	3rd	Elected in 1996. Resigned after being appointed Director of the Drug Enforcement Administration.
Tim Hutchinson	January 3, 1993 – January 2, 1997	Republican	3rd	Elected in 1992. Retired to run for U.S. senator and resigned early when elected.
William Joseph Hynes	March 4, 1873 – March 3, 1875	Liberal Republican	At-large	Elected in 1872. Lost re-election.
Henderson M. Jacoway	March 4, 1911 – March 3, 1923	Democratic	5th	Elected in 1910. Retired.
Robert Ward Johnson	March 4, 1847 – March 3, 1853	Democratic	At-large	Elected in 1846. Retired.
James Kimbrough Jones	March 4, 1881 – February 19, 1885	Democratic	2nd	Elected in 1880. Resigned when elected U.S. Senator.
Wade H. Kitchens	January 3, 1937 – January 3, 1941	Democratic	7th	Elected in 1936. Lost renomination to Harris.
Blanche Lincoln	January 3, 1993 – January 3, 1997	Democratic	1st	Elected in 1992. Retired.
John Sebastian Little	December 3, 1894 – March 3, 1903	Democratic	2nd	Elected to finish Breckinridge's term. Redistricted to the 4th district.
John Sebastian Little	March 3, 1903 – January 14, 1907	Democratic	4th	Redistricted from the 2nd district and re-elected in 1902. Retired to run for governor and resigned early.
Robert B. Macon	March 4, 1903 – March 3, 1913	Democratic	1st	Elected in 1902. Lost renomination to Caraway.
John Little McClellan	January 3, 1935 – January 3, 1939	Democratic	6th	Elected in 1934. Retired to run for U.S. Senator.
Philip D. McCulloch Jr.	March 4, 1893 – March 3, 1903	Democratic	1st	Elected in 1892. Retired.
Thomas Chipman McRae	December 7, 1885 – March 3, 1903	Democratic	3rd	Elected to finish Jones's term. (Note: James K. Jones was redistricted from the 2nd district and re-elected in 1884, but resigned before the term began when elected U.S. senator.); Retired.
John E. Miller	March 4, 1931 – November 14, 1937	Democratic	2nd	Elected in 1930. Resigned when elected U.S. Senator.
Wilbur Mills	January 3, 1939 – January 3, 1977	Democratic	2nd	Elected in 1938. Retired.
Robert Neill	March 4, 1893 – March 3, 1897	Democratic	6th	Elected in 1892. Lost renomination to Brundidge Jr.
Thomas Willoughby Newton	February 6, 1847 – March 3, 1847	Whig	At-large	Elected to finish Yell's term. Retired.
Catherine Dorris Norrell	April 18, 1961 – January 3, 1963	Democratic	6th	Elected to finish her husband's term. Retired.
William F. Norrell	January 3, 1939 – February 15, 1961	Democratic	6th	Elected in 1938. Died.
Pearl Peden Oldfield	January 9, 1929 – March 3, 1931	Democratic	2nd	Elected to finish husband's term. Retired.
William Allan Oldfield	March 4, 1909 – November 19, 1928	Democratic	2nd	Elected in 1908. Died.
Tilman Bacon Parks	March 4, 1921 – January 3, 1937	Democratic	7th	Elected in 1920. Retired.
Samuel W. Peel	March 4, 1883 – March 3, 1885	Democratic	4th	Elected in 1882. Redistricted to the 5th district.
Samuel W. Peel	March 4, 1885 – March 3, 1893	Democratic	5th	Redistricted from the 4th district and re-elected in 1884. Lost renomination to Dinsmore.
David Pryor	November 8, 1966 – January 3, 1973	Democratic	4th	Elected in 1966. Retired to run for U.S. senator.
Heartsill Ragon	March 4, 1923 – June 16, 1933	Democratic	5th	Elected in 1922. Resigned after being appointed judge for the US District Court for the Western district of Arkansas.
James B. Reed	October 6, 1923 – March 3, 1929	Democratic	6th	Elected to finish Sawyer's term. Lost renomination to Glover.
Charles C. Reid	March 4, 1901 – March 3, 1903	Democratic	4th	Elected in 1900. Redistricted to the 5th district.
Charles C. Reid	March 4, 1903 – March 3, 1911	Democratic	5th	Redistricted from the 4th district and re-elected in 1902. Retired.
Joseph Taylor Robinson	March 4, 1903 – January 14, 1913	Democratic	6th	Elected in 1902. Resigned after being elected Governor of Arkansas.
Tommy F. Robinson	January 3, 1985 – July 28, 1989	Democratic	2nd	Re-elected in 1984. Switched parties and retired to run for governor.
Tommy F. Robinson	July 28, 1989 – January 3, 1991	Republican	2nd	Re-elected in 1984. Switched parties and retired to run for governor.
Anthony A. C. Rogers	March 4, 1869 – March 3, 1871	Democratic	2nd	Elected in 1868. Lost re-election to O. Snyder.
John H. Rogers	March 4, 1883 – March 3, 1885	Democratic	3rd	Elected in 1882. Redistricted to the 4th district.
John H. Rogers	March 4, 1885 – March 3, 1891	Democratic	4th	Redistricted from the 3rd district and re-elected in 1884. Retired.
Logan Holt Roots	June 22, 1868 – March 3, 1871	Republican	1st	Elected in 1868 to finish vacant term. Lost re-election to Hanks.
Mike Ross	January 3, 2001 – January 3, 2013	Democratic	4th	Elected in 2000. Retired to run for Governor.
Albert Rust	March 4, 1855 – March 3, 1857	Democratic	2nd	Elected in 1854. Lost renomination to Warren.
Albert Rust	March 4, 1859 – March 3, 1861	Democratic	2nd	Elected in 1858. Retired.
Lewis E. Sawyer	March 4, 1923 – May 5, 1923	Democratic	6th	Elected in 1922. Died.
Ambrose Hundley Sevier	February 13, 1828 – June 15, 1836	None	Territory	Elected to finish Conway's term. Retired to run for U.S. senator upon statehood.
William Ferguson Slemons	March 4, 1875 – March 3, 1881	Democratic	2nd	Elected in 1874. Retired.
Oliver P. Snyder	March 4, 1871 – March 3, 1875	Republican	2nd	Elected in 1870. Lost renomination to John Middleton Clayton.
Vic Snyder	January 3, 1997 – January 3, 2011	Democratic	2nd	Elected in 1996. Retired.
Boyd Anderson Tackett	January 3, 1949 – January 3, 1953	Democratic	4th	Elected in 1948. Retired to run for governor.
Chester W. Taylor	October 25, 1921 – March 3, 1923	Democratic	6th	Elected to finish S. Taylor's term. Retired.
Samuel M. Taylor	January 15, 1913 – September 13, 1921	Democratic	6th	Elected to finish Robinson's term, having already been elected to the next term. Died.
David D. Terry	December 19, 1933 – January 3, 1943	Democratic	5th	Elected to finish Ragon's term. Retired to run for U.S. senator.
William L. Terry	March 4, 1891 – March 3, 1901	Democratic	4th	Elected in 1890. Lost renomination to Reid.
Ray Thornton	January 3, 1973 – January 3, 1979	Democratic	4th	Elected in 1972. Retired to run for U.S. Senator.
Ray Thornton	January 3, 1991 – January 1, 1997	Democratic	2nd	Elected in 1990. Resigned to become Associate justice of the Arkansas Supreme Court.
John N. Tillman	March 4, 1915 – March 3, 1929	Democratic	3rd	Elected in 1914. Retired.
James William Trimble	January 3, 1945 – January 3, 1967	Democratic	3rd	Elected in 1944. Lost re-election to Hammerschmidt.
Jim Guy Tucker	January 3, 1977 – January 3, 1979	Democratic	2nd	Elected in 1976. Retired to run for U.S. Senator.
Robert M. Wallace	March 4, 1903 – March 3, 1911	Democratic	7th	Elected in 1902. Lost renomination to Goodwin.
Edward A. Warren	March 4, 1853 – March 3, 1855	Democratic	2nd	Elected in 1853. Retired.
Edward A. Warren	March 4, 1857 – March 3, 1859	Democratic	2nd	Elected in 1856. Retired.
Bruce Westerman	January 3, 2015 – present	Republican	4th	Elected in 2014. Incumbent
William W. Wilshire	March 4, 1873 – June 16, 1874	Republican	3rd	Elected in 1872. Lost contested election to Gunter.
William W. Wilshire	March 4, 1875 – March 3, 1877	Democratic	3rd	Elected in 1874. Retired.
Effiegene Locke Wingo	November 4, 1930 – March 3, 1933	Democratic	4th	Elected to finish her husband's term. Retired.
Otis Wingo	March 4, 1913 – October 21, 1930	Democratic	4th	Elected in 1912. Died.
Steve Womack	January 3, 2011 – present	Republican	3rd	Elected in 2010. Incumbent.
Archibald Yell	December 14, 1836 – March 3, 1839	Democratic	At-large	Elected in 1836 to finish the short term. Re-elected in 1837. Retired.
Archibald Yell	March 4, 1845 – July 1, 1846	Democratic	At-large	Elected in 1844. Resigned to serve in the United States Volunteers.

== See also ==
- Arkansas's congressional delegations
- Arkansas's congressional districts
- List of United States senators from Arkansas
