= Governor Little =

Governor Little may refer to:

- Brad Little (politician) (born 1954), 33rd Governor of Idaho
- John Sebastian Little (1851–1916), 21st Governor of Arkansas
