= Philip Doddridge (disambiguation) =

Philip Doddridge (1702–1751), was an English Nonconformist

Philip Doddridge may also refer to:

- Philip Doddridge (Virginia politician) (1773–1832), U.S. Representative from Virginia
- Philip Doddridge McCulloch (1851–1928), American lawyer and politician
