= 1828 Arkansas Territory's at-large congressional district special election =

1828 United States House of Representatives special election in Arkansas Territory
- December 15, 1828
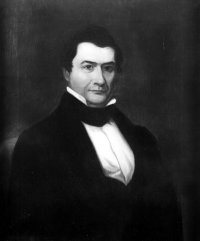
Nominee	Ambrose Sevier	Richard Searcy	Andrew Scott
Party	Democratic
Popular vote	939	883	116
Percentage	48.45%	45.56%	5.99%
U.S. delegate before election
Henry W. Conway
Democratic-Republican
Elected U.S. delegate
Ambrose Sevier
Democratic

The 1828 Arkansas Territory at-large congressional district special election was held on December 15, 1828, following the death of Henry W. Conway, who had served as the Democratic-Republican Party delegate to Congress from Arkansas Territory since 1823. The position was for the territory's lone non-voting delegate to the United States House of Representatives.

== Vacancy ==
Delegate Henry Conway died from a wound sustained in a duel with Robert Crittenden on October 29, 1827.

=== Setting ===
Following Conway's death, Governor of Arkansas Territory George Izard issued a proclamation calling for a special election on the third Monday in December 1828.

== Candidates ==
Five candidates announced for the position, with two later withdrawing.

- Ambrose Sevier, attorney, politician and planter. Served in Arkansas House of Representatives from 1823 to 1827, including serving as Speaker of the House in 1827. Member of the politically powerful Conway-Johnson family
- Richard Searcy, former secretary of the Arkansas Territorial Council
- Andrew Scott, lawyer and politician, former superior court judge and circuit court judge

=== Declined ===
- Benjamin Desha, political ally of Robert Crittenden, withdrew
- Alexander S. Walker, withdrew

== Election ==
=== Results ===
Arkansas special congressional delegate election, 1828
Party	Candidate	Votes	%
Democratic	Ambrose Sevier	939	48.45%
	Richard Searcy	883	45.56%
	Andrew Scott	116	5.99%
Total votes			100.0
Democratic hold			
