= Thomas M. Gunter =

American politician

Thomas Gunter
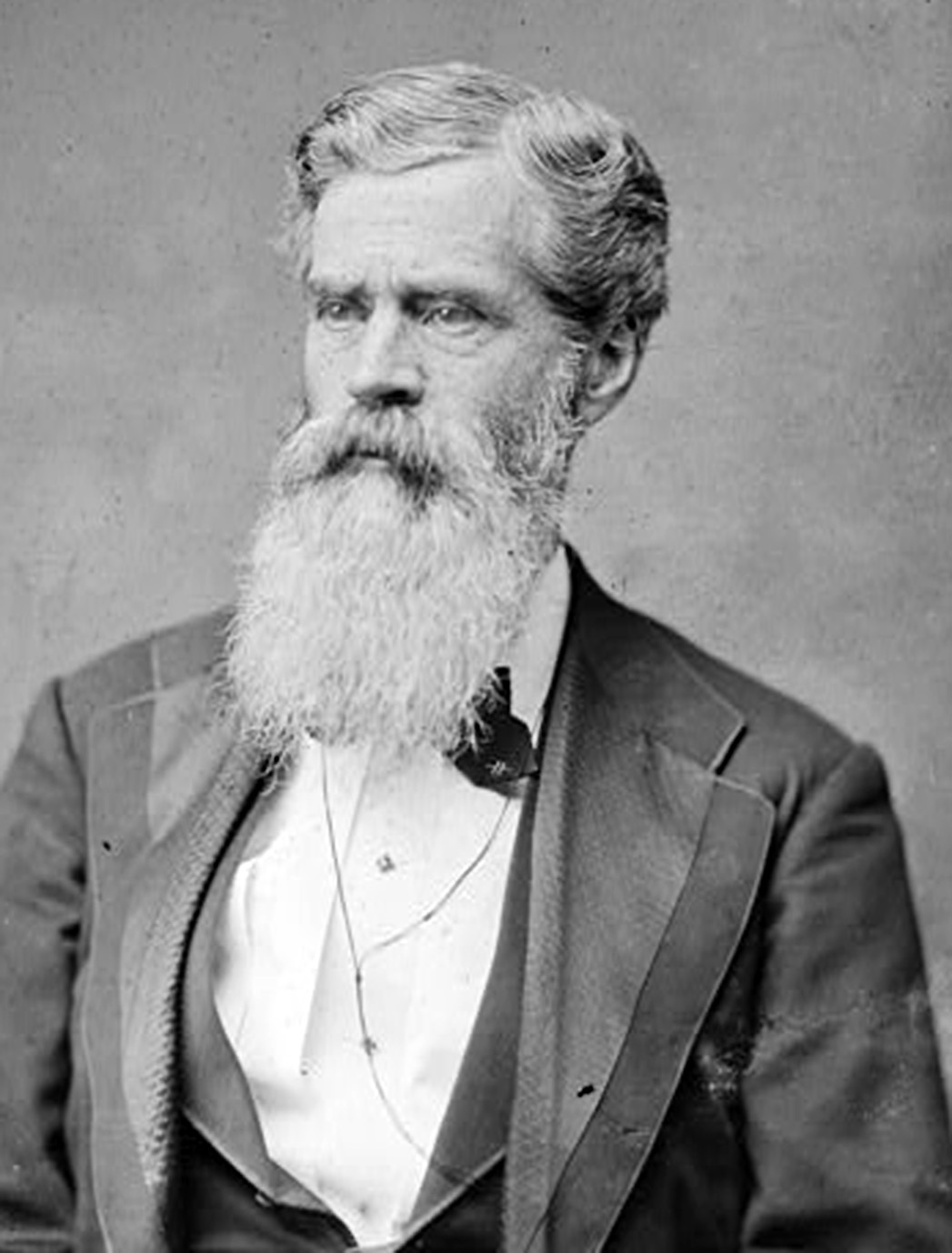

Member of the U.S. House of Representatives from Alabama
- In office June 16, 1874 – March 3, 1883
- Preceded by: William W. Wilshire (3rd); District established (4th)
- Succeeded by: William W. Wilshire (3rd); Samuel W. Peel (4th)
- Constituency: 3rd district (1874-75); 4th district (1875-83)

Personal details
- Born: September 18, 1826 Warren County, Tennessee, U.S.
- Died: January 12, 1904 (aged 77) Fayetteville, Arkansas, U.S
- Party: Democratic

Military service
- Allegiance: Confederate States
- Branch/service: Confederate States Army
- Rank: Colonel
- Unit: 13th Arkansas Infantry Regiment
- Battles/wars: American Civil War

Thomas Montague Gunter (September 18, 1826 – January 12, 1904) was a U.S. representative from Arkansas.

Born near McMinnville, Warren County, Tennessee, Gunter pursued classical studies and was graduated from Irving College in 1850. He studied law and was admitted to the bar in 1853 and commenced practice in Fayetteville, Washington County, Arkansas, in 1853.

During the Civil War, Gunter served in the Confederate States Army as colonel of the Thirteenth Regiment, Arkansas Volunteers.

Gunter served as prosecuting attorney for the fourth judicial circuit from 1866 to 1868.

A Democrat, Thomas Gunter disputed the 1872 general election of Republican William W. Wilshire to the Forty-third Congress for the Third Congressional District, and after a lengthy review by the Committee on Elections, he was declared the winner and rightful occupant of the seat, ultimately taking the oath on June 16, 1874. Gunter was subsequently elected to the Forty-fourth Congress for the Fourth Congressional District of Arkansas and to the three succeeding Congresses and served from June 16, 1874, to March 3, 1883. He served as chairman of the Committee on Private Land Claims (Forty-fourth through Forty-sixth Congresses).

During his time in Congress, Gunter was a strong proponent of tribal sovereignty. In objection to an 1880 removal agreement with the Utes of Colorado, Gunter proclaimed that "The Government has 'treated' with the Indians as the owners of the soil...In doing this we have always respected the tribe or communal relation. We have given these lands to the 'tribes' not to the individual. The experiment has worked well. The Creeks, Cherokees, Choctaws, Chickasaws, and Seminoles settled in the Indian Territory are now classed as 'civilized tribes.'" In the same speech, Gunter argued that "under the communal system of land ownership we have seen the Indians gradually passing from the nomadic through the pastoral life to a higher civilization." In this moment Gunter opposed the push toward forcing Native peoples to take on individual allotments (which would see most of their lands taken by citizens of the United States).

He was not a candidate for renomination in 1882. He resumed the practice of law in Fayetteville, Arkansas, and died there January 12, 1904. He was interred in Evergreen Cemetery.

U.S. House of Representatives
| Preceded by William W. Wilshire | Member of the U.S. House of Representatives from Arkansas's 3rd congressional district June 16, 1874 – March 3, 1875 | Succeeded by William W. Wilshire |
| Preceded by District created | Member of the U.S. House of Representatives from Arkansas's 4th congressional district March 4, 1875 – March 3, 1883 | Succeeded by Samuel W. Peel |
