= William W. Wilshire =

American judge (1830–1888)

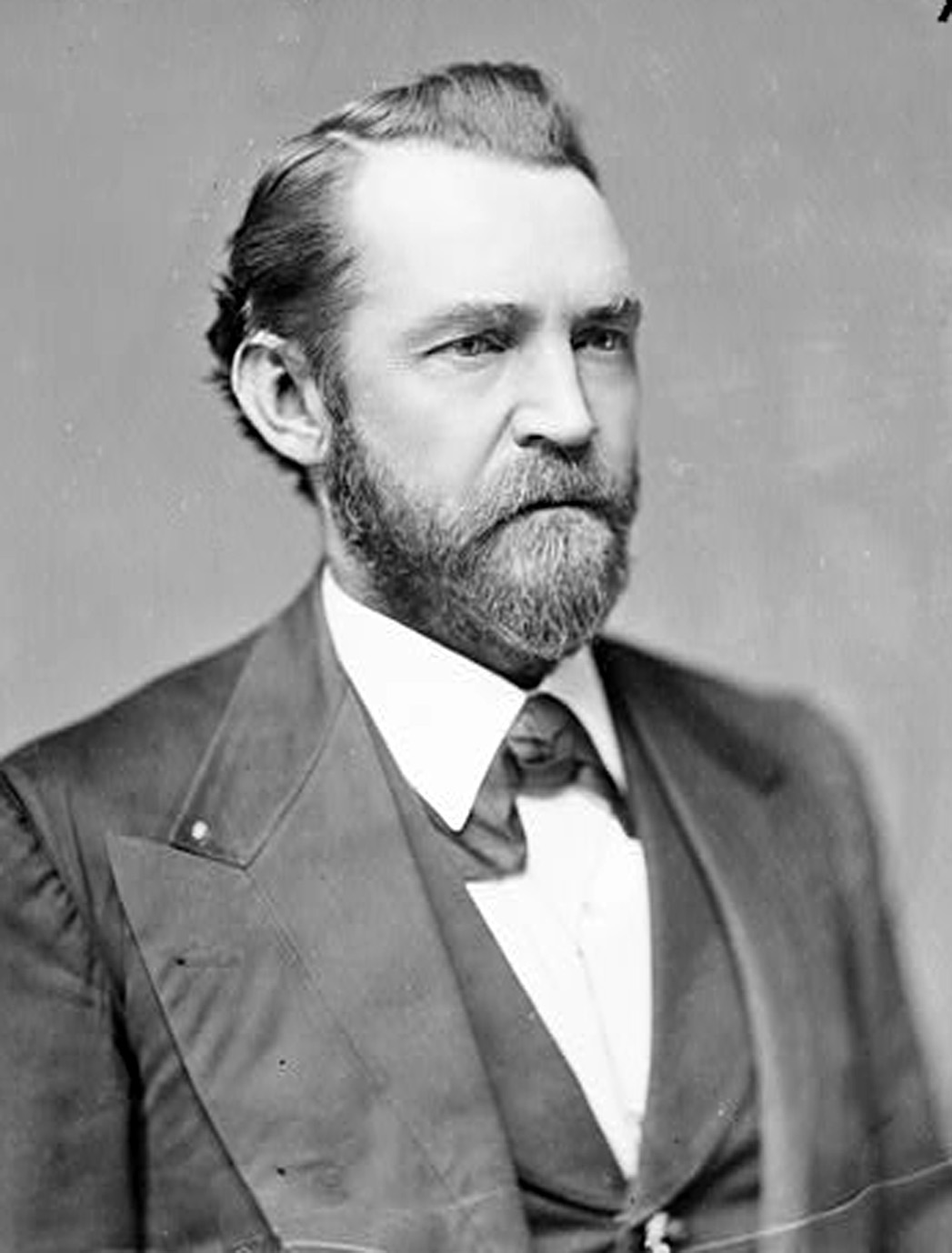

Member of the U.S. House of Representatives from Arkansas's 3rd district
- In office March 3, 1873 – June 16, 1874
- Preceded by: Thomas Boles
- Succeeded by: Thomas M. Gunter
- In office March 4, 1875 – March 3, 1877
- Preceded by: redistricted
- Succeeded by: Jordan E. Cravens

Chief Justice of the Arkansas Supreme Court
- In office 1868 – February 1871
- Appointed by: Powell Clayton
- Preceded by: new constitution
- Succeeded by: John McClure

Personal details
- Born: William Wallace Wilshire; September 8, 1830 Shawneetown, Illinois, U.S.
- Died: August 19, 1888 (aged 57) Washington, D.C., U.S.
- Resting place: Mount Holly Cemetery, Little Rock, Arkansas, U.S. 34°44′15.3″N 92°16′42.5″W
- Party: Democratic
- Other political affiliations: Republican (before 1874)
- Spouse: Catherine A. Reynolds
- Children: 2

Military service
- Allegiance: United States
- Branch/service: Union Army
- Years of service: 1862–1864
- Rank: Major
- Unit: 126th Illinois Infantry
- Battles/wars: Civil War

William W. Wilshire (born William Wallace Wilshire; September 8, 1830 – August 19, 1888) was an American lawyer and politician during the Reconstruction era who served as the chief justice of the Arkansas Supreme Court from 1868 to 1871 and as the U.S. representative for Arkansas's 3rd congressional district (1873–74 and 1875–77).

== Biography ==
Born in Shawneetown, Illinois, Wilshire was educated in the country schools. He spent three years in California engaged in gold mining, from 1852 to 1855, when he returned to his home in Port Byron and engaged in the coal mining and mercantile business. He studied law and was admitted to the bar in 1859.

Wilshire entered the Union Army as major in the One Hundred and Twenty-sixth Regiment, Illinois Volunteer Infantry, and served from July 16, 1862. Following the Siege of Vicksburg, his regiment was sent to Arkansas and on the Little Rock Campaign under Major General Frederick Steele's force. He resigned July 16, 1864 because of health reasons.

After the war, he relocated to the capital city of Little Rock, Arkansas, and commenced the practice of law, becoming partners with Elbert H. English. He was appointed solicitor general of the state in 1867. After adoption of the 1868 Arkansas Constitution, Wilshire was appointed by new Governor of Arkansas Powell Clayton as the first chief justice of the Arkansas Supreme Court under the new constitution. Wilshire resigned in 1871 to resume his law practice and enter elective politics.

The 1872 general election of Wilshire as a Republican Representative to the Forty-third U. S. Congress for the Third Congressional District was disputed by Democrat Thomas Gunter and, after a lengthy review by the Committee on Elections, Gunter was declared the winner and rightful occupant of the seat, ultimately taking the oath on June 16, 1874.

After defeat, Wilshire returned to Arkansas and decided to run for Congress again, this time as a Democrat. Again running for the Arkansas's 3rd congressional district, but now challenging incumbent William J. Hynes due to redistricting, Wilshire was elected to the Forty-fourth Congress (March 4, 1875 – March 3, 1877). He was not a candidate for renomination in 1876. He engaged in the practice of law in Washington, D.C., where he pursued claims on behalf of the Cherokee Nation against the government. He died in Washington August 19, 1888 and was interred at Mount Holly Cemetery in Little Rock.

== Notes ==
U.S. House of Representatives
Preceded by Thomas Boles	Member of the U.S. House of Representatives from Arkansas's 3rd congressional district 1873 – 1874	Succeeded by Thomas M. Gunter
Preceded by redistricted	Member of the U.S. House of Representatives from Arkansas's 3rd congressional district 1875 – 1877	Succeeded by Jordan E. Cravens
