= William H. Cate =

American politician

William Henderson Cate
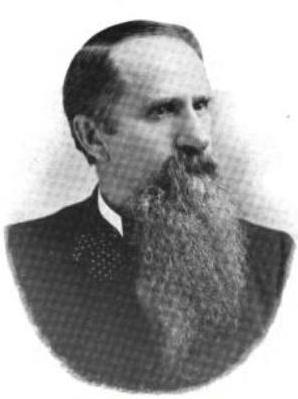
- Congressman William H. Cate

Member of the U.S. House of Representatives from Arkansas's 1st district
- In office March 4, 1889 – March 5, 1890
- Preceded by: Poindexter Dunn
- Succeeded by: Lewis P. Featherstone
- In office March 4, 1891 – March 3, 1893
- Preceded by: Lewis P. Featherstone
- Succeeded by: Philip McCulloch

Member of the Arkansas House of Representatives from the 1st district
- In office January 2, 1871 – May 11, 1874

Personal details
- Born: November 11, 1839 Murfreesboro, Tennessee
- Died: August 23, 1899 (aged 59) Toledo, Ohio
- Resting place: City Cemetery in Jonesboro, Arkansas
- Citizenship: United States
- Party: Democratic
- Spouse: Virginia E. Warner Cate
- Education: University of Tennessee at Knoxville
- Profession: Teacher; lawyer; politician; judge

Military service
- Allegiance: Confederate States of America
- Branch/service: Confederate States Army
- Rank: Captain
- Battles/wars: Civil War

William Henderson Cate (November 11, 1839 – August 23, 1899) was an American politician, lawyer and judge. In 1889 and 1890, he served part of one term as a U.S. representative from Arkansas. He was removed from his seat following an investigation of election fraud before regaining the seat in the subsequent election, serving an additional term from 1891 to 1893.

== Early life and education ==
Cate was born near Murfreesboro, Tennessee, the son of Noah Cate, who was a Baptist minister, and his wife Margaret M. (Henderson) Cate. He attended the common schools, as well as an academy at Abingdon, Virginia. He ultimately graduated from the University of Tennessee at Knoxville in 1857.

In 1868, he married Virginia E. Warner of Craighead County, and the couple had one son.

== Early career ==
Cate taught school while studying law.

=== Civil War ===
During the Civil War, he served in the Confederate States Army, eventually rising to the rank of captain.

=== Legal career ===
After a move to Jonesboro, Arkansas in 1865, Cate studied law, and was admitted to the bar in Arkansas. In 1866, he commenced the practice of law, counting among his clients the Iron Mountain and Southern Railroad and the St. Louis, Arkansas, and Texas Railroad.

== Political career ==
In 1870, he was elected as a Democrat to the Arkansas House of Representatives to represent the first district, which included Craighead, Cross, Jackson, Mississippi and Poinsett counties. Cate was seated in the 18th Arkansas General Assembly on January 2, 1871 and represented the 1st district alongside Charles Minor, L. D. Rozell and J. A. Meek. Cate was re-elected for the 19th Arkansas General Assembly, representing the 1st alongside Roderick Joiner, Hiram McVeigh, and F.W. Lynn. During his time in the Arkansas House, Cate served on the Agriculture and the Cities and Corporations committees.

He was elected prosecuting attorney for Second Judicial Circuit on October 14, 1878, Following the death of circuit judge James Frierson, Cate was appointed circuit judge by Governor of Arkansas James H. Berry on March 17, 1884 to fill the remainer of the term. Judge Cate won election to a full term on the bench September 1, 1884. He organized the Bank of Jonesboro in 1887. He also served as a member of the Board of Visitors of the University of Arkansas in Fayetteville.

=== Congress ===
In 1888, Cate ran as a Democrat for a seat in the U.S. Congress against Lewis Featherstone, a candidate of the Union Labor party. Cate won the election by slightly less than 1,000 votes.

Cate subsequently presented credentials as a Democratic member-elect to the Fifty-first Congress where he served from March 4, 1889 until March 5, 1890.

==== Election challenge ====
Cate was removed from his seat following a House investigation. Featherstone had contested the election after having been put up as a candidate to oppose Cate by The Agricultural Wheel. In an agreement between The Wheel and the Republican Party, the Republicans in control of Congress agreed to support Featherstone against Cate. In return "The Wheel" agreed to support John M. Clayton against Clifton R. Breckinridge. The House Committee on Elections decided in favor of Featherstone, ruling that he won by 86 votes.

Cate was appointed to return as 2nd Circuit judge following the resignation of J. E. Riddick on October 30, 1890, filling the remainder of the term.

=== Return to Congress ===
Cate again challenged Featherstone in the 1890 election, winning by a vote of 15,437 to 14,834. Featherstone did not contest the results. With his victory, Cate was elected to the Fifty-second Congress which ran from March 4, 1891 until March 3, 1893.

Cate served on the Railways and Canals Committee, introducing bills to build a railroad bridge across the Black River, and to construct a levee on the nearby Mississippi River.

He declined to be a candidate for renomination in 1892 to the Fifty-third Congress.

== Later career ==
He later resumed the practice of law in Jonesboro, Arkansas.

== Death ==
While on a visit in Toledo, Ohio, Cate died of cancer on August 23, 1899 (age 59 years, 285 days). He is interred at the City Cemetery in Jonesboro, Arkansas.

U.S. House of Representatives
Preceded by Poindexter Dunn	Member of the U.S. House of Representatives from Arkansas's 1st congressional district 1889–1890	Succeeded by Lewis P. Featherstone
Preceded by Lewis P. Featherstone	Member of the U.S. House of Representatives from Arkansas's 1st congressional district 1891–1893	Succeeded by Philip McCulloch
