= Lucien C. Gause =

American politician

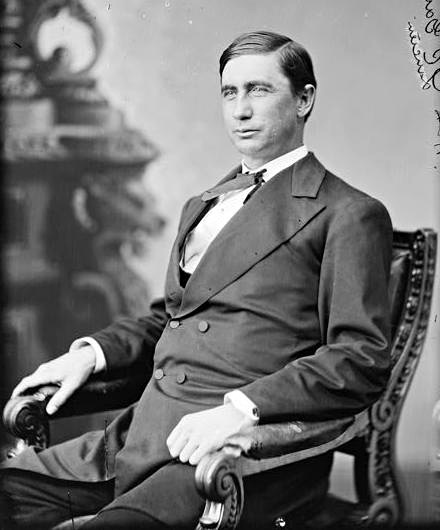

Member of the U.S. House of Representatives from Arkansas's 1st district
- In office March 4, 1875 – March 3, 1879
- Preceded by: Asa Hodges
- Succeeded by: Poindexter Dunn

Member of the Arkansas House of Representatives
- In office 1866

Personal details
- Born: Lucien Coatsworth Gause; December 25, 1836 Wilmington, North Carolina, U.S.
- Died: November 5, 1880 (aged 43) Jacksonport, Arkansas, U.S.
- Party: Democratic
- Spouse: Virginia Ann Page
- Profession: Politician, Lawyer

Military service
- Allegiance: Confederate States
- Service: Confederate States Army
- Years of service: 1861–1865
- Rank: Colonel
- Commands: Gause's Brigade
- Battles/wars: American Civil War; Battle of Jenkins' Ferry

Lucien Coatsworth Gause (December 25, 1836 – November 5, 1880) was an American lawyer, politician and military veteran who served in the Confederate Army during the Civil War. From 1875 to 1879, he served two terms in the U.S. House of Representatives, representing an Arkansas congressional district.

== Biography ==
Born near Wilmington, North Carolina, Gause moved to Lauderdale County, Tennessee and studied under a private tutor. He graduated from the University of Virginia, studied law, graduated from Cumberland University and was admitted to the bar, commencing practice in Jacksonport, Arkansas in 1859.

=== Confederate Army ===
At the outbreak of the Civil War, he entered the Confederate Army as a lieutenant and was later promoted to colonel.

=== Career ===
Gause resumed practicing law in Jacksonport in 1865, was a member of the Arkansas House of Representatives in 1866 and was a commissioner to represent the State of Arkansas in Washington, D.C.

He unsuccessfully contested the election of Asa Hodges as a Democrat to the United States House of Representatives in 1873.

==== Congress ====
He successfully won election to the House of Representatives in 1874, serving from 1875 to 1879, not being a candidate for renomination in 1878.

=== Later career and death ===
Afterwards, Gause resumed practicing law until his death in Jacksonport, Arkansas on November 5, 1880. He was interred in a private cemetery near Jacksonport.

U.S. House of Representatives
Preceded by Asa Hodges	Member of the U.S. House of Representatives from Arkansas's 1st congressional district March 4, 1875 – March 3, 1879	Succeeded by Poindexter Dunn
