= Samuel W. Peel =

American politician

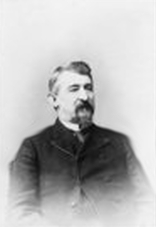

Judge of the Arkansas Circuit Court for the 4th district
- In office 1873–1876

Member of the U.S. House of Representatives from Arkansas
- In office March 4, 1883 – March 3, 1893
- Preceded by: Thomas M. Gunter (4th); District established (5th)
- Succeeded by: John H. Rogers (4th); Hugh A. Dinsmore (5th)
- Constituency: 4th district (1883-85); 5th district (1885-93)

Personal details
- Born: September 13, 1831 Batesville, Arkansas, U.S.
- Died: December 18, 1924 (aged 93) Bentonville, Arkansas, U.S.
- Spouse: Mary Emaline Berry (m. 1853)
- Children: 9

Samuel West Peel (September 13, 1831 – December 18, 1924) was an American lawyer, politician, and jurist who served as a member of the United States House of Representatives from 1883 to 1893.

== Early life and education ==
Peel was born near Batesville, Arkansas, to John Wilson and Elizabeth West Peel. At age four, his mother died and he went to live with his grandparents. Peel attended the local public schools. As a teenager, he worked as a store clerk at his father's store. He also worked as a deputy court clerk for his father.

== Career ==
He served as clerk of the circuit court of Carroll County, Arkansas, from 1858 to 1860.

=== Confederate Army ===
After Arkansas seceded from the Union, he entered the Confederate service in 1861 as a private. Peel was elected major of the 3rd Arkansas Infantry Regiment, and later as a colonel of the 4th Arkansas Infantry Regiment. Peel fought at the Battle of Wilson's Creek and Battle of Prairie Grove. At the end of the war, he mustered out as a lieutenant colonel.

=== Law practice ===
After leaving the Army, he returned home to Carrollton and found his house burned down. He studied law under his brother-in-law, Judge James Middleton Pittman. In 1865, he was admitted to the bar and commenced the practice of his profession in Carrollton, Arkansas. He moved to Bentonville, Benton County, in 1867 and continued practicing of law.

=== Politics ===
He was appointed by the governor of Arkansas as the prosecuting attorney of the fourth judicial circuit of Arkansas in 1873. He held that position until 1876.

Peel was elected as a Democrat to the United States House of Representatives for the Forty-eighth and to the four succeeding Congresses (March 4, 1883 – March 3, 1893). He served as chairman of the Committee on Indian Affairs (Fiftieth and Fifty-second Congresses). Tribal councils frequently met on the front lawn of his mansion. He was an unsuccessful candidate for renomination in 1892. He resumed his law practice in Bentonville, Arkansas, and before the United States Court of Claims at Washington, D.C., until 1915.

== Personal life ==
Peel married Mary Emaline Berry on January 30, 1853, and had nine children. He died in Bentonville, Arkansas, on December 18, 1924, at age 93. He was interred in the Bentonville cemetery. The city Peel, Oregon, was named for him.

U.S. House of Representatives
Preceded by Thomas M. Gunter	Member of the U.S. House of Representatives from Arkansas's 4th congressional district 1883–1885	Succeeded by John H. Rogers
Preceded by district created	Member of the U.S. House of Representatives from Arkansas's 5th congressional district 1885–1893	Succeeded by Hugh A. Dinsmore
