= Lewis P. Featherstone =

American politician

Lewis Porter Featherstone
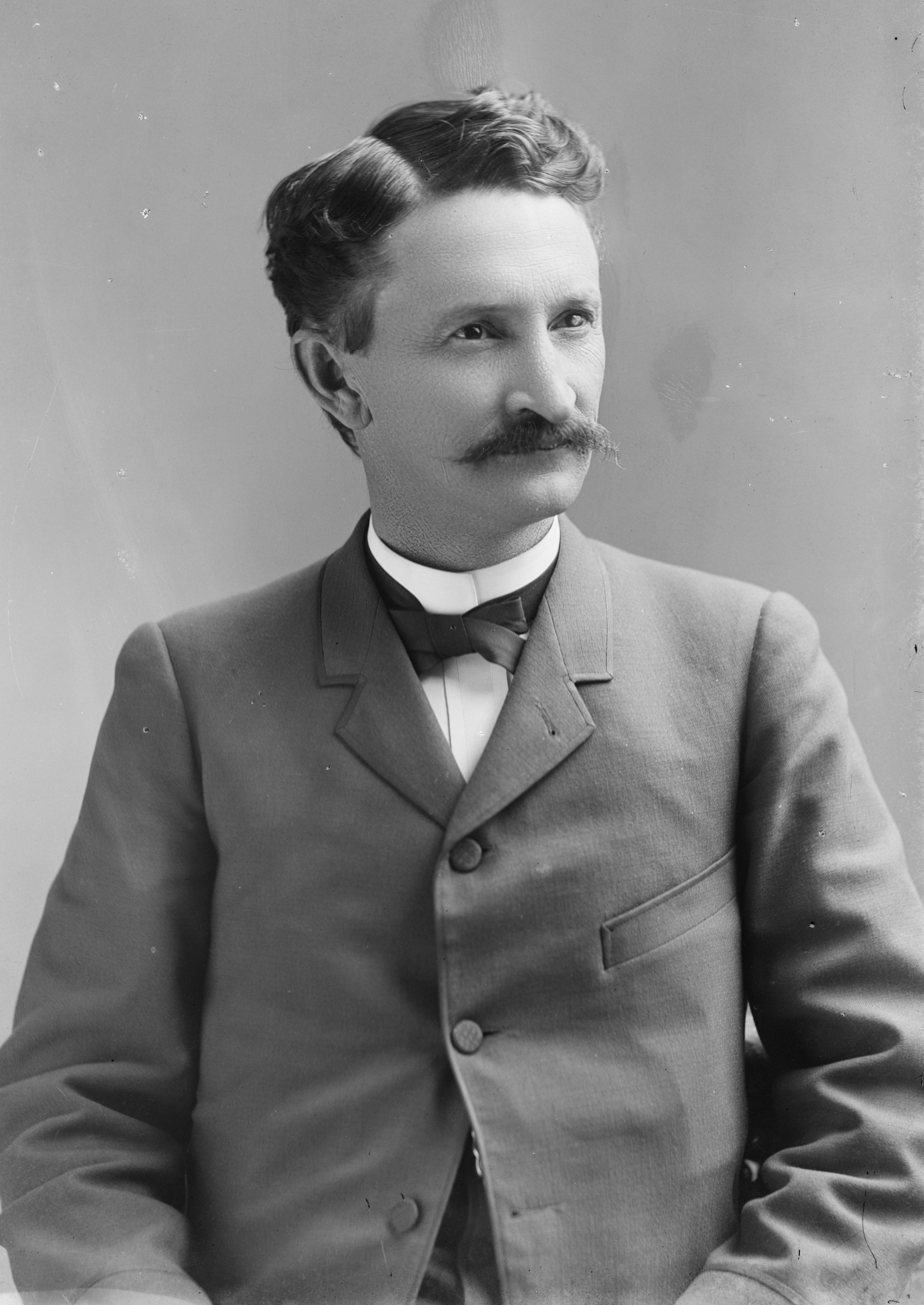
- Portrait by C. M. Bell, 1890

Member of the U.S. House of Representatives from Arkansas's 1st district
- In office March 5, 1890 – March 3, 1891
- Preceded by: William H. Cate
- Succeeded by: William H. Cate

Member of the Arkansas House of Representatives
- In office 1887–1888

Personal details
- Born: July 28, 1851 Oxford, Mississippi, U.S.
- Died: March 14, 1922 (aged 70) Longview, Texas, U.S.
- Resting place: Mission Burial Park South, San Antonio, Texas
- Party: Democratic; Union Labor; Populist
- Spouse: Alice White Featherstone
- Education: Cumberland University
- Profession: Planter; Politician; Lobbyist; Railroad owner

Military service
- Allegiance: United States
- Branch/service: United States Army
- Years of service: 1898
- Rank: First lieutenant captain
- Unit: First United States Volunteer Infantry
- Battles/wars: Spanish–American War

Lewis Porter Featherstone (July 28, 1851 – March 14, 1922) was an American planter and farm activist who served for one year as a Union Labor Party U.S. Representative from Arkansas from 1890 to 1891.

== Biography ==
Born in Oxford, Mississippi, Featherstone was the eldest son of Lewis H. and Elizabeth (Porter) Featherstone. He attended the common schools and Cumberland School of Law at Cumberland University, Lebanon, Tennessee. He married Alice White in 1874, and the couple had five children.

== Career ==
Featherstone engaged in planting in Shelby County, Tennessee from 1872 to 1881. He moved to Forrest City in St. Francis County, Arkansas, and continued as a planter.

=== State legislature ===
As a Democratic member, Featherstone served in the Arkansas House of Representatives in 1887 and 1888. He was elected president of the Agricultural Wheel (a farmers' organization) in 1887 and reelected in 1888.

=== Congress ===
In 1888, he ran as a Union Labor Party candidate against Democrat William H. Cate for the Fifty-first Congress; although Cate was initially declared re-elected, Featherstone challenged on the grounds of election fraud. Following the Featherstone v. Cate hearings held in the U.S. House of Representatives, Featherstone was seated in Congress in 1890 and served until March 3, 1891. He was an unsuccessful candidate on the Union Labor ticket for reelection in 1890 to the Fifty-second Congress.

=== Populist Party ===
By 1892, constantly under attack for supporting efforts to preserve the right of blacks and poor whites to vote, Featherstone was one of the Union Labor members who joined the Populist Party, and served as platform committee chairman at the state party convention, which adopted a resolution (introduced by a black delegate from the St. Francis County delegation) calling on Arkansas "to elevate the down-trodden sons and daughters of industry in all matters ... irrespective of race or color." Featherstone was the head of the Arkansas delegation to the Populist national convention in Omaha. After the defeat in 1892 of the Arkansas Populists, Featherstone abandoned politics as populism faded, and Arkansas Democrats reasserted their political dominance by means of laws that disenfranchised many black and poor white voters.

=== Later career ===
Featherstone eventually moved to Galveston, Texas, where he engaged in railroad building and in development of the iron resources of Texas. During the Spanish–American War in 1898, he was commissioned as a first lieutenant, and became captain, in the First United States Volunteer Infantry, a unit mustered out in Galveston that saw no service outside the United States.

== Death ==
He died in Longview, Texas, on March 14, 1922, and is interred at Mission Burial Park South, San Antonio, Texas.

U.S. House of Representatives
Preceded by William H. Cate	Member of the U.S. House of Representatives from Arkansas's 1st congressional district 1890–1891	Succeeded by William H. Cate
