= John Henry Rogers =

American judge (1845–1911)

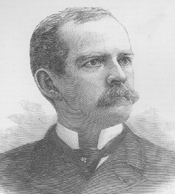

Judge of the United States District Court for the Western District of Arkansas
- In office November 27, 1896 – April 17, 1911 (Note: Sources vary on Rogers' date of death, which is uncertain, most giving it as April 16 or 17, 1911. Rogers' body was found on April 17 and in the lack of consensus among sources, that is the date this article will use.)
- Appointed by: Grover Cleveland
- Preceded by: Isaac C. Parker
- Succeeded by: Frank A. Youmans

Member of the U.S. House of Representatives from Arkansas
- In office March 4, 1883 – March 3, 1891
- Preceded by: Jordan E. Cravens (3rd); Samuel W. Peel (4th)
- Succeeded by: Thomas C. McRae (3rd); William L. Terry (4th)
- Constituency: 3rd district (1883-85); 4th district (1885-91)

Personal details
- Born: John Henry Rogers; October 9, 1845 Roxobel, North Carolina, U.S.
- Died: April 17, 1911 (aged 65) Little Rock, Arkansas, U.S.
- Resting place: Oak Cemetery; Fort Smith, Arkansas
- Party: Democratic
- Education: Centre College; University of Mississippi (A.B.)

John Henry Rogers (October 9, 1845 – April 17, 1911) was a United States representative from Arkansas and a United States district judge of the United States District Court for the Western District of Arkansas.

== Education and career ==
Born on October 9, 1845, in Roxobel, Bertie County, North Carolina, Rogers moved to Mississippi in 1852 with his parents, who settled near Madison Station (now Madison) and attended the common schools. He joined the Ninth Mississippi Volunteer Regiment of the Confederate States Army as a private in March 1862. He was promoted to first lieutenant in the same regiment and served throughout the war. He attended Centre College and received an Artium Baccalaureus degree in 1868 from the University of Mississippi. He was admitted to the bar and entered private practice in Canton, Mississippi, from 1868 to 1869. He continued private practice in Fort Smith, Arkansas, from 1869 to 1877. He was a Judge of the Circuit Court of Arkansas for Pulaski County from 1877 to 1882. He returned to private practice in Fort Smith from 1882 to 1883.

=== Details of his military service ===
On March 15, 1862, the seventeen year old Rogers and his brother William enlisted as privates in the Semmes Rifles, which became Company H of the Ninth Mississippi Volunteer (Infantry) Regiment. Rogers was wounded twice and was commissioned a first lieutenant at the age of nineteen, for gallantry at the Battle of Franklin in Tennessee. At the war's end in May 1865, Rogers walked nearly a thousand miles from North Carolina to his home in Mississippi.

== Congressional service ==
Rogers was elected as a Democrat from Arkansas's 3rd congressional district and Arkansas's 4th congressional district to the United States House of Representatives of the 48th United States Congress and to the three succeeding Congresses, serving from March 4, 1883, to March 3, 1891. He was Chairman of the Committee on Mileage for the 50th United States Congress. He declined to be a candidate for renomination. He resumed private practice in Fort Smith from 1891 to 1896. He was a member of the Democratic state convention in 1892. He was a delegate to the 1892 Democratic National Convention.

== Federal judicial service ==
Rogers received a recess appointment from President Grover Cleveland on November 27, 1896, to a seat on the United States District Court for the Western District of Arkansas vacated by Judge Isaac C. Parker. He was nominated to the same position by President Cleveland on December 8, 1896. He was confirmed by the United States Senate on December 15, 1896, and received his commission the same day. His service terminated on April 17, 1911, due to his death of an apparent heart attack in Little Rock, Arkansas. He was interred in Oak Cemetery in Fort Smith. He was survived by his wife, Mary (Gray) Rogers, and four children.

== Family ==
Rogers was the son of Absalom and Harriet Rice Rogers. His father became a wealthy planter, owning land worth more than $18,000 and 28 slaves.

== Sources ==
- "John Henry Rogers". Biographical Directory of the United States Congress.

U.S. House of Representatives
Preceded by Jordan E. Cravens	Member of the U.S. House of Representatives from Arkansas's 3rd congressional district 1883–1885	Succeeded by Thomas Chipman McRae
Preceded by Samuel W. Peel	Member of the U.S. House of Representatives from Arkansas's 4th congressional district 1885–1891	Succeeded by William L. Terry
Legal offices
Preceded by Isaac C. Parker	Judge of the United States District Court for the Western District of Arkansas; 1896–1911	Succeeded by Frank A. Youmans
