= Hugh A. Dinsmore =

American politician (1850–1930)

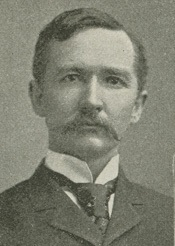

Member of the U.S. House of Representatives from Arkansas
- In office March 4, 1893 – March 3, 1905
- Preceded by: Samuel W. Peel (5th); Thomas C. McRae (3rd)
- Succeeded by: Charles C. Reid (5th); John C. Floyd (3rd)
- Constituency: 5th district (1893-1903); 3rd district (1903-05)

United States Consul General to Korea
- In office April 13, 1887 – May 26, 1890
- President: Grover Cleveland; Benjamin Harrison
- Preceded by: William Harwar Parker
- Succeeded by: Augustine Heard

Personal details
- Born: Hugh Anderson Dinsmore; December 24, 1850 Cave Springs, Arkansas, U.S.
- Died: May 2, 1930 (aged 79) St. Louis, Missouri, U.S.
- Resting place: Evergreen Cemetery, Fayetteville, Arkansas
- Party: Democratic
- Spouse: Elizabeth Le Grand Fisher Dinsmore
- Children: Hamilton A. Dinsmore

Hugh Anderson Dinsmore (December 24, 1850 – May 2, 1930) was an American lawyer and politician who served six terms as and a U.S. Representative from Arkansas from 1893 to 1905.

He was a vocal opponent of the Annexation of Hawaii.

== Biography ==
Born at Cave Springs, Arkansas, Dinsmore was the son of Alexander Winchester and Catherine Anderson Dinsmore. He attended private schools in Benton and Washington Counties. He married Elizabeth Le Grand Fisher of St. Louis, Missouri, on May 25, 1883. They had one son, Hamilton; and though Elizabeth died on June 19, 1886, he never remarried.

== Early career ==
Dinsmore worked as a store clerk and later a traveling salesman for a St. Louis firm. Deciding to become a lawyer, he persuaded Samuel N. Elliott of Bentonville to proctor him. In 1872 Governor Elisha Baxter appointed him the eleventh Benton County Circuit Court clerk. He resigned in 1874, when he was admitted to the bar, and the following year, he moved to Fayetteville, where he entered into a law partnership with David Walker. In 1878, he was elected prosecuting attorney for the Fourth Judicial District, and served until 1884.

== Political career ==
In January 1887, Dinsmore was appointed by President Cleveland as Minister Resident and consul general to the Kingdom of Korea and served until May 25, 1890. Because of his acquaintance with Korea and Korean matters, he was sought out by a young Syngman Rhee in January 1905, while he was on his diplomatic mission United States to secure aid for Korea against Japanese annexation. Dinsmore succeeded in getting Rhee a brief meeting with Secretary of State John Hay, but Rhee's mission would ultimately end in failure.

=== Congress ===
After he resumed the practice of law in Fayetteville, Arkansas, Dinsmore was elected as a Democrat to the Fifty-third and to the five succeeding Congresses. He served from March 4, 1893 to March 3, 1905. He was an unsuccessful candidate for renomination in 1904 to the Fifty-ninth Congress.

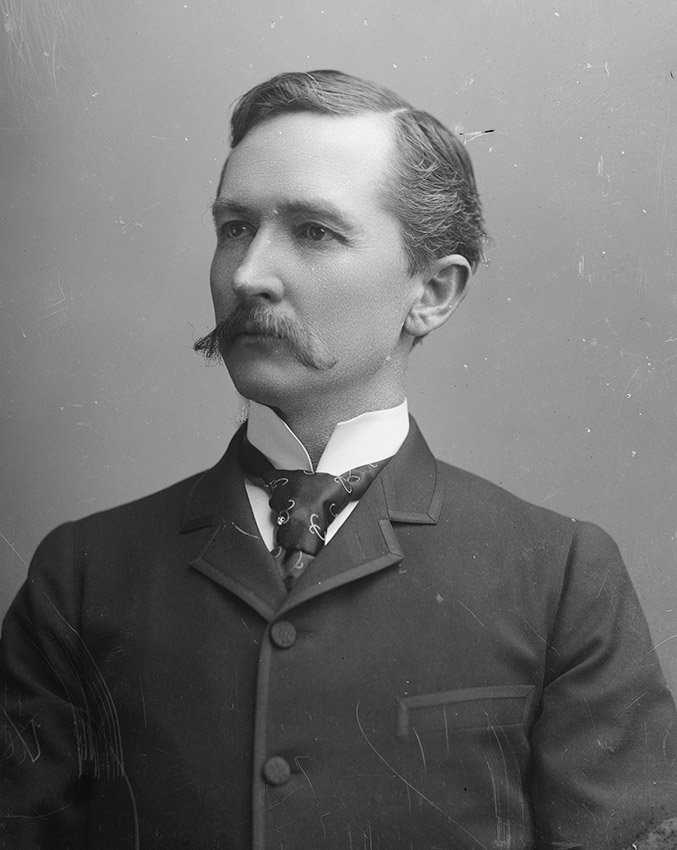

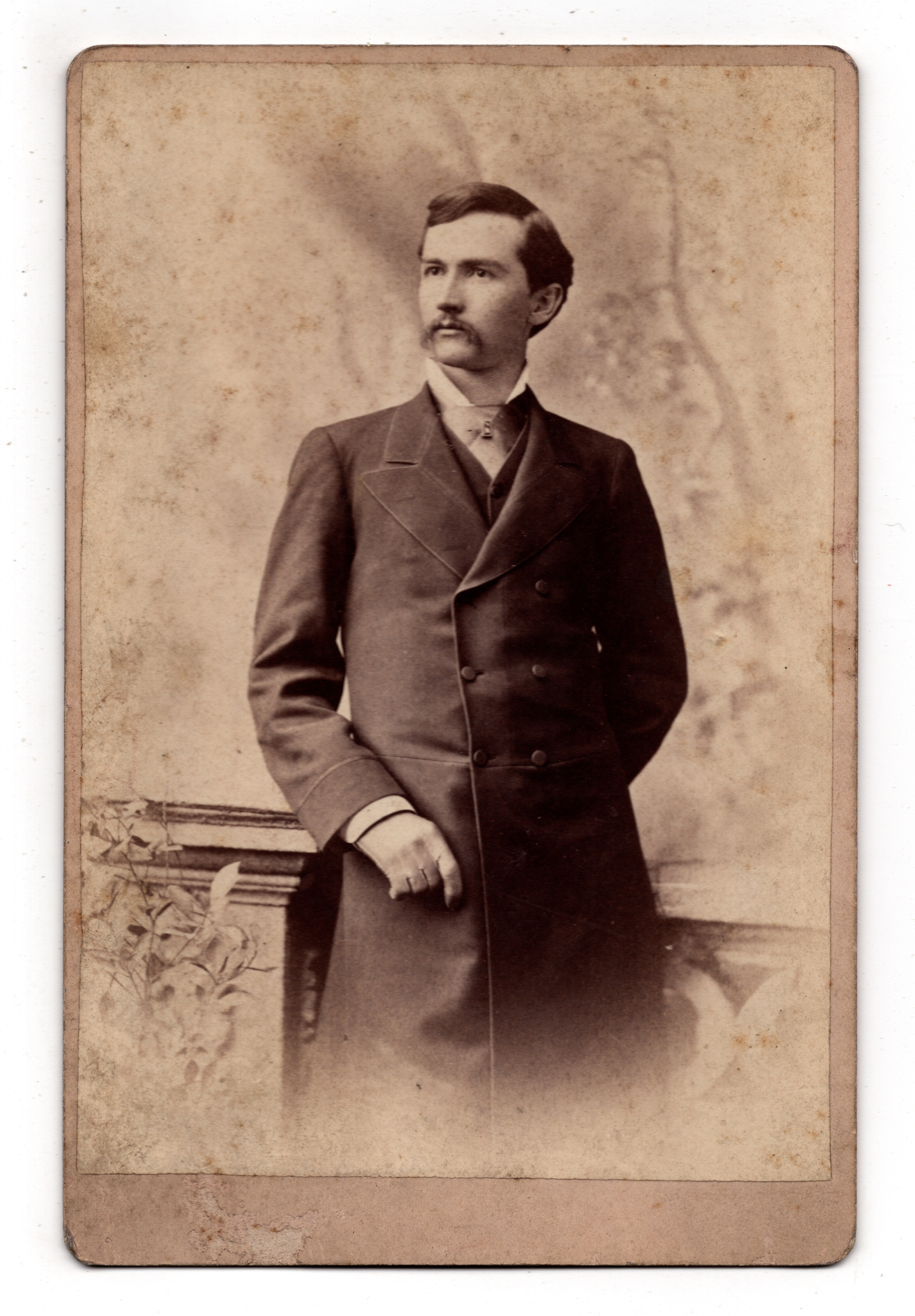
Young Hugh Anderson Dinsmore

== Later career ==
He resumed the practice of law in Fayetteville, Arkansas, and in later years devoted most of his time to the management of his farming interests. He served as member of the board of trustees of the University of Arkansas.

== Death ==
Dinsmore died in St. Louis, Missouri, on May 2, 1930 (age 79 years, 129 days). He is interred at Evergreen Cemetery, Fayetteville, Arkansas.

Diplomatic posts
Preceded by George Clayton Foulk	Resident Minister to the Kingdom of Korea; 1887 – 1890	Succeeded by Augustine Heard II
U.S. House of Representatives
Preceded by Samuel W. Peel	Member of the U.S. House of Representatives from Arkansas's 5th congressional district 1893 – 1903	Succeeded by Charles C. Reid
Preceded by Thomas C. McRae	Member of the U.S. House of Representatives from Arkansas's 3rd congressional district 1903 – 1905	Succeeded by John C. Floyd
