= Charles C. Reid =

American politician (1868–1922)

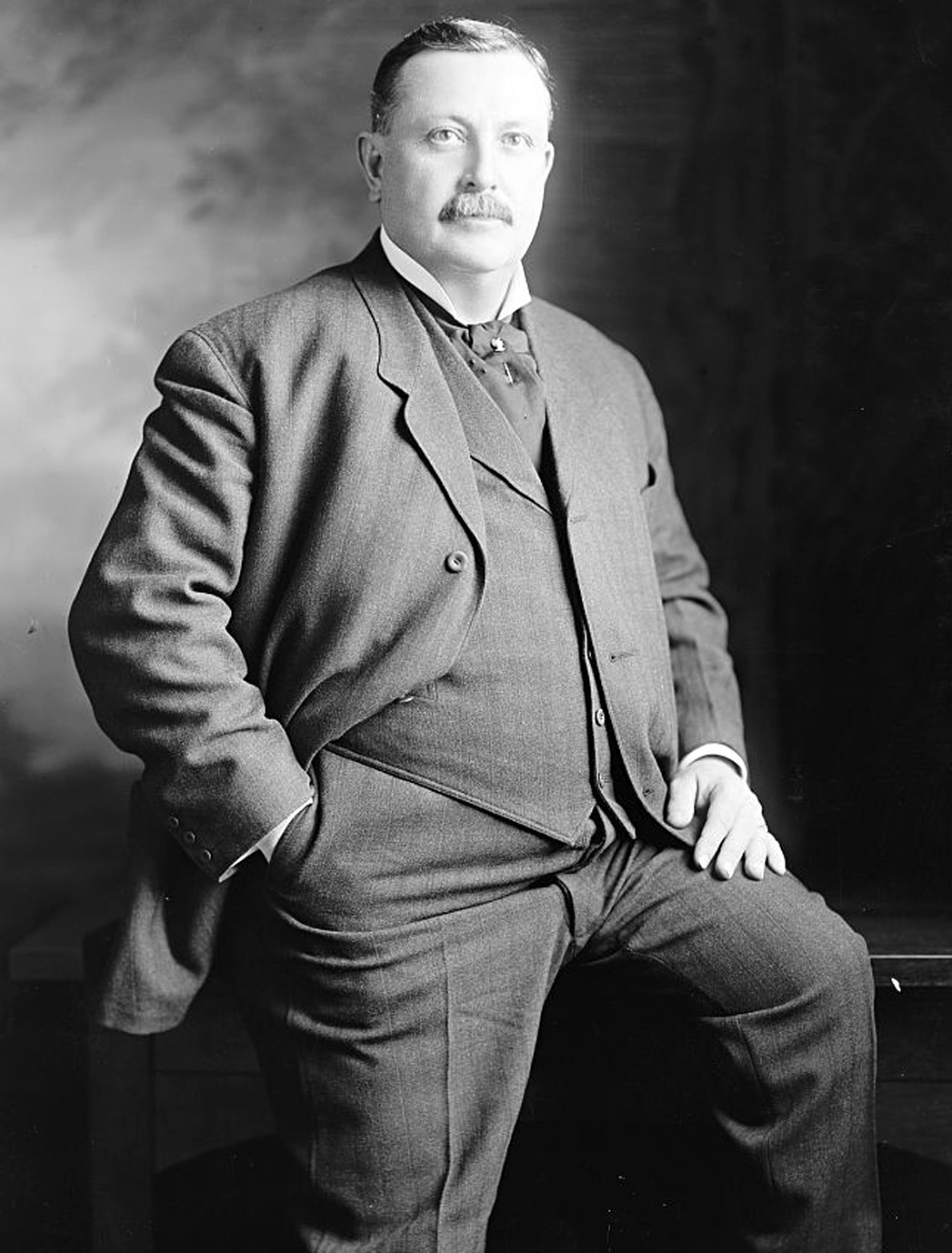

Member of the U.S. House of Representatives from Arkansas's 5th district
- In office March 4, 1901 – March 3, 1911
- Preceded by: William L. Terry
- Succeeded by: John Sebastian Little

Personal details
- Born: Charles Chester Reid; June 15, 1868 Clarksville, Arkansas, U.S.
- Died: May 20, 1922 (aged 53) Little Rock, Arkansas, U.S.
- Resting place: Oakland Cemetery, Arkansas
- Party: Democratic
- Education: University of Arkansas at Fayetteville; Vanderbilt University
- Occupation: Attorney

Charles Chester Reid (June 15, 1868 – May 20, 1922) was an American lawyer and politician who served five terms as a U.S. representative from Arkansas from 1901 to 1911.

== Early life and career ==
Born in Clarksville, Arkansas, Reid attended the public schools and the University of Arkansas at Fayetteville in 1883–1885. He was graduated from the law department of Vanderbilt University, Nashville, Tennessee, in 1887.

He was admitted to the bar the same year and commenced practice in Morrilton, Arkansas. He served as prosecuting attorney of Conway County from 1894 to 1898. In 1898 he voluntarily retired from office and resumed the practice of law.

== Congress ==
Reid was elected as a Democrat to the Fifty-seventh and to the four succeeding Congresses (March 4, 1901 – March 3, 1911). He was not a candidate for renomination in 1910 to the Sixty-second Congress.

== Later career and death ==
He again engaged in the practice of his profession in Little Rock, Arkansas, where he died on May 20, 1922.

He was interred in Oakland Cemetery.

U.S. House of Representatives
| Preceded by William L. Terry | Member of the U.S. House of Representatives from Arkansas's 4th congressional district March 4, 1901 – March 3, 1903 | Succeeded by John S. Little |
| Preceded by Hugh A. Dinsmore | Member of the U.S. House of Representatives from Arkansas's 5th congressional district March 4, 1903 – March 3, 1911 | Succeeded by Henderson M. Jacoway |
