= Poindexter Dunn =

American politician

Member of the U.S. House of Representatives from Arkansas's 1st district
- In office March 4, 1879 – March 3, 1889
- Preceded by: Lucien C. Gause
- Succeeded by: William H. Cate

Member of the Arkansas House of Representatives
- In office 1858

Personal details
- Born: Poindexter Dunn; November 3, 1834 Wake County, North Carolina, U.S.
- Died: October 12, 1914 (aged 79) Texarkana, Texas, U.S.
- Resting place: Rose Hill Cemetery, Texarkana, Texas
- Party: Democratic
- Spouses: Ellenora Patton Dunn; Anna Fussell Dunn
- Children: Anna Mae Estes Dunn; Dorothea Dunn (died as an infant in 1888.)
- Education: Jackson College, Columbia, Tennessee
- Profession: Cotton planter; lawyer; politician; orator

Military service
- Allegiance: Confederate States of America
- Branch/service: Confederate States Army
- Rank: Captain
- Battles/wars: American Civil War

Poindexter Dunn (November 3, 1834 – October 12, 1914) was a Confederate Army veteran and American politician who served five terms as a U.S. representative from Arkansas from 1879 to 1889.

== Biography ==
Born in Wake County, North Carolina near Raleigh, Dunn was the son of Grey and Lydia Baucum Dunn. He moved with his father to Limestone County, Alabama, in 1837. He attended the country schools, and graduated from Jackson College, Columbia, Tennessee, in 1854. He studied law, and moved to St. Francis County, Arkansas, in 1856. He married a Ms. Ellenora (also spelled Ellanora) Patton. Later, he remarried to another Arkansas resident, Anna Fussell, with whom he had two daughters, Anna Mae Estes Dunn and Dorothea Dunn who died as an infant in 1888.

== Career ==
Dunn was elected to the State house of representatives in 1858, and was a successful cotton grower until 1861. He owned slaves. He served as a captain in the Confederate States Army during the Civil War. Continuing his study of the law, he was admitted to the bar in 1867 and commenced the practice of law in Forrest City, Arkansas.

=== Congress ===
Elected as a Democrat to the Forty-sixth and to the four succeeding Congresses, Dunn served from March 4, 1879, to March 3, 1889. He served as chairman of the Committee on Merchant Marine and Fisheries (Fiftieth Congress). Not a candidate for renomination in 1888, he moved to Los Angeles, California, and continued the practice of law.

=== Later career ===
Appointed a special commissioner for the prevention of frauds on the customs revenue, Dunn moved to New York City in 1893. He moved to Baton Rouge, Louisiana, in 1895 and engaged in the construction of railroads, until he settled in Texarkana, Texas, in 1905.

== Death ==
Dunn died in Texarkana, Bowie County, Texas, on October 12, 1914 (age 79 years, 343 days). He is interred at Rose Hill Cemetery, Texarkana, Texas.

U.S. House of Representatives
| Preceded by Lucien C. Gause | Member of the U.S. House of Representatives from Arkansas's 1st congressional district 1879–1889 | Succeeded by William H. Cate |
