= Robert B. Macon =

American politician (1859–1925)

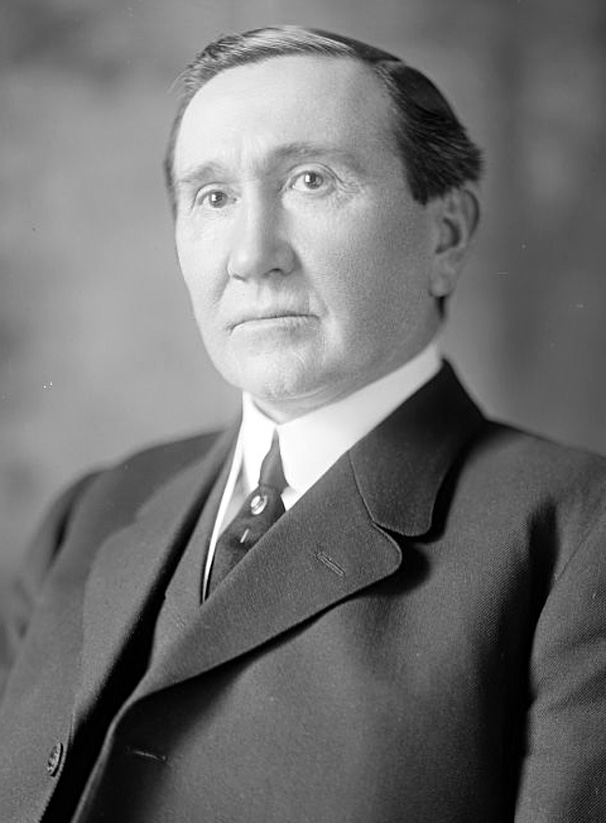

Member of the U.S. House of Representatives from Arkansas's 1st district
- In office March 4, 1903 – March 3, 1913
- Preceded by: Philip D. McCulloch Jr.
- Succeeded by: Thaddeus H. Caraway

Personal details
- Born: July 6, 1859 Phillips County, Arkansas
- Died: August 9, 1925 (aged 66) Marvell, Arkansas
- Resting place: Elmwood Cemetery, Memphis, Tennessee
- Party: Democratic

Robert Bruce Macon (July 6, 1859 – October 9, 1925) was an American lawyer and politician who served five terms as a U.S. representative from Arkansas from 1903 to 1913.

== Biography ==
Macon was born near Trenton, Arkansas, and was left an orphan at the age of nine. He attended the public schools and studied at home, and engaged in agricultural pursuits. He studied law and was admitted to the bar in 1891. He commenced practice in Helena, Arkansas.

=== Political career ===
He served as member of the Arkansas House of Representatives from 1883 to 1887, as clerk of the circuit court from 1892 to 1896, and as prosecuting attorney for the first judicial district from 1898 to 1902.

==== Congress ====
Macon was elected as a Democrat to the Fifty-eighth and to the four succeeding Congresses (March 4, 1903 – March 3, 1913). He was an unsuccessful candidate for renomination in 1912.

=== Later career and death ===
He continued the practice of law in Helena, Arkansas, until he retired in 1917.

He died in Marvell, Arkansas, on October 9, 1925 and was interred in Elmwood Cemetery, Memphis, Tennessee.

U.S. House of Representatives
Preceded by Philip McCulloch	Member of the U.S. House of Representatives from Arkansas's 1st congressional district March 4, 1903 – March 3, 1913	Succeeded by Thaddeus Caraway
