= Philip D. McCulloch Jr. =

American politician

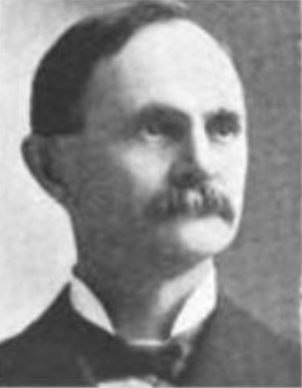

Member of the U.S. House of Representatives from Arkansas's 1st district
- In office March 4, 1893 – March 3, 1903
- Preceded by: William H. Cate
- Succeeded by: Robert B. Macon

Personal details
- Born: June 23, 1851 Murfreesboro, Tennessee
- Died: November 26, 1928 (aged 77) Marianna, Arkansas
- Resting place: Cedar Heights Cemetery
- Party: Democratic

Philip Doddridge McCulloch Jr. (June 23, 1851 – November 26, 1928) was an American lawyer and politician who served five terms as a U.S. representative from Arkansas from 1893 to 1903.

== Biography ==
Born in Murfreesboro, Tennessee, McCulloch moved with his parents to Trenton, Tennessee, where he attended private schools and Andrew College. McCulloch studied law and was admitted to the bar in 1872, after which he began a law practice in Trenton. In February 1874, McCulloch moved to Marianna, Arkansas, where he continued the practice of law.

=== Early career ===
McCulloch was elected prosecuting attorney for the first judicial district in 1878, and was reelected to three successive terms, serving until 1884. He served as chairman of the Democratic central committee of Lee County, Arkansas, from 1875 to 1893.

McCulloch was elected mayor of Marianna, Arkansas, in 1875, but declined to serve. He served as member of the board of education and as a delegate to the Democratic state convention in 1890.

=== Congress ===
McCulloch was elected as a Democrat to the 53rd and the four succeeding Congresses (March 4, 1893 – March 3, 1903), after which he declined to be a candidate for renomination.

=== Later career and death ===
He chose to resume the practice of law in Marianna, Arkansas, where he died on November 26, 1928. McCulloch was interred in Cedar Heights Cemetery.

U.S. House of Representatives
Preceded by William H. Cate	Member of the U.S. House of Representatives from Arkansas's 1st congressional district March 4, 1893 – March 3, 1903	Succeeded by Robert B. Macon
