= Arkansas's at-large congressional district =

Former congressional district

- Obsolete district
- Created: 1836; 1873; 1883
- Eliminated: 1853; 1875; 1885
- Years active: 1836-1853; 1873-1875; 1883-1885

Arkansas's at-large congressional district was a congressional district for the United States House of Representatives in Arkansas from 1836 to 1885.

Upon achieving statehood, Arkansas elected its sole representative statewide at-large. For two Congresses in the mid- to late-19th century, Arkansas elected one of its representatives statewide on a general ticket, with the remaining elected from districts

== List of members representing the district ==
Member	Party	Years	Cong ress	Electoral history
District created August 1, 1836, after achieving statehood.
Archibald Yell (Fayetteville)	Jacksonian	December 14, 1836 – March 3, 1839	24th 25th	Elected in 1836 to finish the short term. Re-elected in 1837. Retired.
Archibald Yell (Fayetteville)	Democratic	December 14, 1836 – March 3, 1839	24th 25th	Elected in 1836 to finish the short term. Re-elected in 1837. Retired.
Edward Cross (Washington)	Democratic	March 4, 1839 – March 3, 1845	26th 27th 28th	Elected in 1838. Re-elected in 1840. Re-elected in 1842. Retired.
Archibald Yell (Fayetteville)	Democratic	March 4, 1845 – July 1, 1846	29th	Elected in 1844. Resigned to serve in the United States Volunteers.
Vacant		July 1, 1846 – February 6, 1847	29th	
Thomas W. Newton (Little Rock)	Whig	February 6, 1847 – March 3, 1847	29th	Elected to finish Yell's term. Retired.
Robert W. Johnson (Little Rock)	Democratic	March 4, 1847 – March 3, 1853	30th 31st 32nd	Elected in 1846. Re-elected in 1848. Re-elected in 1851. Retired.
Vacant		March 4, 1853 – March 3, 1873	33rd 34th 35th 36th 37th 38th 39th 40th 41st 42nd	Civil War and Reconstruction
William J. Hynes (Little Rock)	Liberal Republican	March 4, 1873 – March 3, 1875	43rd	Elected in 1872. Lost re-election.
Vacant		March 4, 1875 – March 3, 1883	44th 45th 46th 47th	Seat inactive.
Clifton R. Breckinridge (Pine Bluff)	Democratic	March 4, 1883 – March 3, 1885	48th	Elected in 1882. Redistricted to the 2nd district.
District eliminated March 4, 1885
