= William Joseph Hynes =

American politician

William Hynes
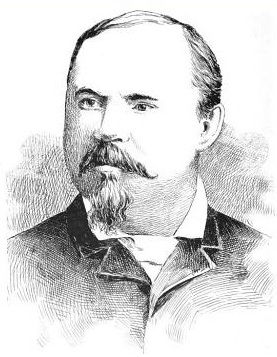

Member of the U.S. House of Representatives from Arkansas's at-large district district
- In office March 4, 1873 - March 3, 1875
- Preceded by: Robert W. Johnson
- Succeeded by: Clifton R. Breckinridge

Personal details
- Born: William Joseph Hynes; March 31, 1843 Kilkee, County Clare, Ireland
- Died: April 2, 1915 (aged 72)
- Resting place: Calvary Cemetery
- Party: Liberal Republican

William Joseph Hynes (March 31, 1843 – April 2, 1915) was an American newspaperman, lawyer, and politician who served one term as a U.S. representative from Arkansas from 1873 to 1875.

== Biography ==
He was born in Kilkee, County Clare, Ireland on March 31, 1843. His family immigrated to the United States in 1854, following the death of his father, and settled in Springfield, Massachusetts. Hynes attended the public schools of Springfield and became a printer after completing an apprenticeship at the Springfield Republican newspaper.

His mother died in 1864 and Hynes relocated to Nashville, Tennessee, to study law with attorney John O'Neill. He attended Columbian University's law school (now George Washington University Law School) in Washington, D.C., while working as a newspaper reporter and secretary for Benjamin F. Rice, a United States senator from Arkansas. He graduated in 1870, and his work for Rice inspired him to move to Arkansas. He was admitted to the bar and commenced practice in Little Rock.

=== Congress ===
Hynes had been a Democrat, but Rice was a Republican, and Hynes became involved in the Liberal Republican movement of the 1870s. He was elected as a Liberal Republican to the 43rd Congress (March 4, 1873 – March 3, 1875). He was the sole non-Republican to vote in favor of the Civil Rights Act of 1875. He was an unsuccessful candidate for reelection in 1874 to the 44th Congress.

=== Later career ===
He moved to Chicago in 1876 and resumed the practice of law. He returned to the Democratic Party and was active in the Irish Home Rule movement.

He retired from the practice of law in 1910 and moved to Los Angeles, California, where he remained until his death.

=== Death ===
He died on April 2, 1915, and was interred in Calvary Cemetery, vault H.

U.S. House of Representatives
| Preceded by District inactive | Member of the U.S. House of Representatives from Arkansas's at-large congressional district 1873–1875 | Succeeded by District inactive |
