= William L. Terry =

American politician

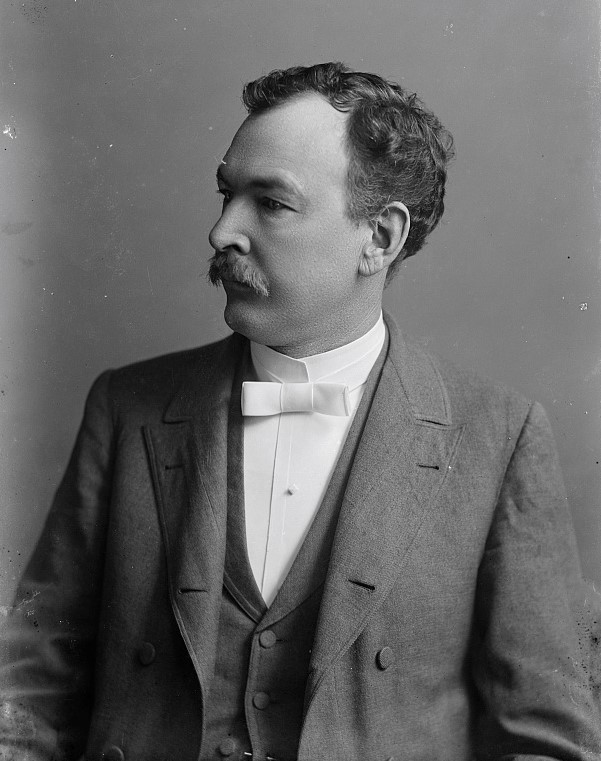

Member of the U.S. House of Representatives from Arkansas's 4th district
- In office March 4, 1891 – March 3, 1901
- Preceded by: John H. Rogers
- Succeeded by: Charles C. Reid

Personal details
- Born: William Leake Terry; September 27, 1850 Wadesboro, North Carolina, U.S.
- Died: November 4, 1917 (aged 67) Little Rock, Arkansas, U.S.
- Party: Democratic
- Children: David D. Terry
- Education: Trinity College

William Leake Terry (September 27, 1850 – November 4, 1917) was an American attorney and politician who served as a member of the United States House of Representatives for Arkansas's 4th congressional district from 1891 to 1901.

== Early life and education ==
Born near Wadesboro, North Carolina, Terry moved with his parents to Tippah County, Mississippi, in 1857 and to Pulaski County, Arkansas, in 1861. He attended the Bingham Military School and was graduated from Trinity College in June 1872, where he was a member of Chi Phi fraternity.

== Career ==
Terry studied law and was admitted to the Arkansas Bar Association in November 1873. He served as member of the Little Rock City Council from 1877 to 1879 and Arkansas Senate in 1878 and 1879. He also served as the city attorney of Little Rock, Arkansas, from 1879 to 1885. He was an unsuccessful candidate for election in 1886 to the Fiftieth Congress.

Terry was elected as a Democrat to the Fifty-second and to the four succeeding congresses (March 4, 1891 – March 3, 1901). During his tenure, Terry was a member of the United States House Committee on the Judiciary. He was an unsuccessful candidate for renomination in 1900. He resumed the practice of law in Little Rock, Arkansas.

== Personal life ==
Terry was the father of David D. Terry. He died in Little Rock on November 4, 1917, and was interred in Calvary Cemetery.
