= John S. Little =

American politician (1851-1916)

John Sebastian Little
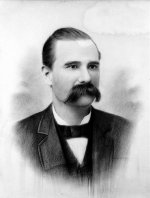

21st Governor of Arkansas
- In office January 18, 1907 – February 15, 1907
- Preceded by: Jeff Davis
- Succeeded by: John Isaac Moore (acting)

Member of the U.S. House of Representatives from Arkansas
- In office December 3, 1894 – January 14, 1907
- Preceded by: Clifton R. Breckinridge (2nd); Charles C. Reid (4th)
- Succeeded by: Stephen Brundidge, Jr. (2nd); William B. Cravens (4th)
- Constituency: 2nd district (1894-1903); 4th district (1903-07)

Member of the Arkansas House of Representatives
- In office 1884-1886

Personal details
- Born: March 15, 1851 Jenny Lind, Arkansas, U.S.
- Died: October 29, 1916 (aged 65) Little Rock, Arkansas, U.S.
- Party: Democratic
- Spouse: Elizabeth Jane Irwin (1861–1953)

John Sebastian Little (March 15, 1851 – October 29, 1916) was an American politician who served as a member of the United States House of Representatives and briefly as the 21st governor of Arkansas, before having a nervous breakdown and resigning.

== Biography ==
John Sebastian "Bass" Little was born in Jenny Lind in Sebastian County, Arkansas; his middle name is a reference to that county, which had been created earlier that year. He was the son of Jesse Eaton Little and Mary Elizabeth (Tatum) Little, and grandson of Eaton Tatum and Charlotte Bruer (Reynolds) Tatum. Little attended Cane Hill College in Washington County for one term.

Little taught school and studied law. He was admitted to the Arkansas bar in 1873, and in 1876 he was elected prosecuting attorney of the 12th Judicial District. He served in that position until 1882.

Little married Elizabeth Jane Irwin on January 4, 1877, in Paris, Arkansas.

== Career ==
Little served in the Arkansas House of Representatives in 1884, and in 1886 was appointed judge in the Twelfth Judicial Circuit and served for four years.

In 1894 he was elected to the United States House of Representatives to fill the unexpired term of U.S. Representative Clifton R. Breckinridge. He was thereafter reelected to the House six times, serving for 12 years. In 1906, Little was elected governor of Arkansas.

Little was inaugurated as governor on January 18, 1907, and shortly thereafter suffered a nervous breakdown which left him unable to execute his political duties. He resigned the governorship after serving for less than a month. He was succeeded as acting governor by the President of the Arkansas Senate, John Isaac Moore.

== Death ==
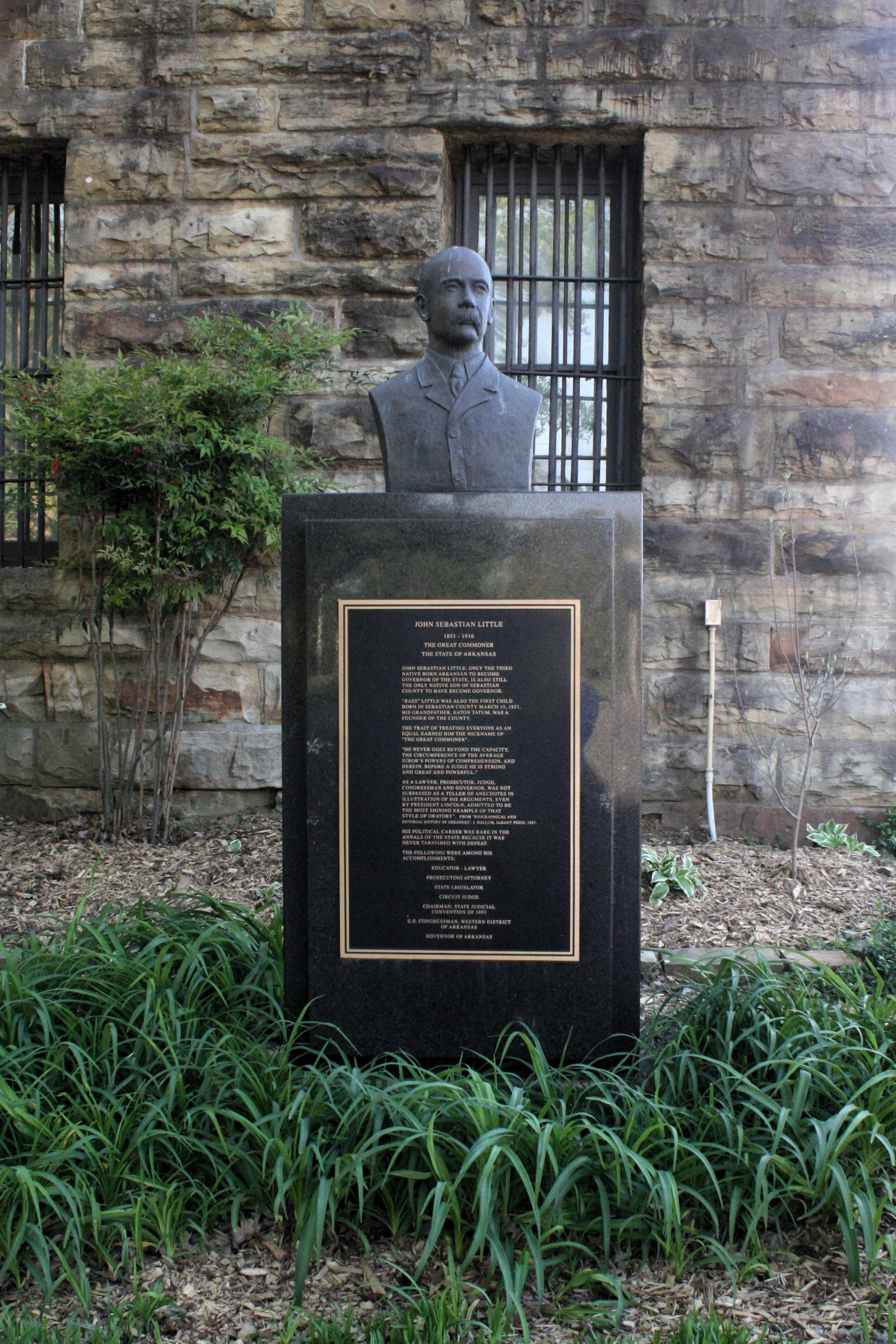
Bust of Little on the grounds of the South Sebastian County Historical Society Museum

Little left Arkansas and went to the Texas gulf coast in an effort to rehabilitate. Little never recovered and died in Little Rock, in the Arkansas State Hospital for Nervous Disorders. He is buried at the City Cemetery in Greenwood.

Party political offices
Preceded by Jeff Davis	Democratic nominee for Governor of Arkansas; 1906	Succeeded by George Washington Donaghey
U.S. House of Representatives
Preceded by Clifton R. Breckinridge	Member of the U.S. House of Representatives from Arkansas's 2nd congressional district 1894–1903	Succeeded by Stephen Brundidge, Jr.
Preceded by Charles C. Reid	Member of the U.S. House of Representatives from Arkansas's 4th congressional district 1903–1907	Succeeded by William B. Cravens
Political offices
Preceded by Jeff Davis	Governor of Arkansas; 1907	Succeeded by John Isaac Moore; Acting Governor
