= List of University of Arkansas people =

The list of University of Arkansas alumni includes distinguished alumni, faculty, and leaders of the University of Arkansas.

== Alumni ==
=== Arts, entertainment and letters ===
- Donna Axum – Miss America 1964
- Brent Bradshaw – writer for television
- Jimmy Dykes – ESPN college football and basketball analyst
- Peggy Gram – champion barbershop music singer and leader of Sweet Adelines International
- Barry Hannah – novelist and short story writer
- E. Lynn Harris – novelist and former in-house writer for the UA English Department
- T. J. Holmes – CNN anchor
- Douglas C. Jones – historical fiction writer
- E. Fay Jones – AIA Gold Medal-winning architect, architect for Thorncrown Chapel
- Laurence Luckinbill – actor, best known as Spock's half-brother in Star Trek V: The Final Frontier
- Darcy Pattison – writer of children's literature, blogger, writing teacher and indie publisher
- Nic Pizzolatto – creator and executive producer of HBO series True Detective
- Charles Portis – author of True Grit
- Ben Rector – singer and songwriter, Brand New
- Savvy Shields – Miss Arkansas 2016, Miss America 2017
- Steve Stern – author; Pushcart Writers' Choice Award, Edward Lewis Wallant Award, National Jewish Book Award
- Edward Durell Stone – world-renowned 20th-century modernist architect who helped create Radio City Music Hall and Kennedy Center for the Performing Arts
- Pat Summerall – sportscaster for CBS, Fox and ESPN
- Tony Tost – Walt Whitman Award-winning poet and screenwriter
- Barry A. Vann – author, lecturer

=== Business, science and academia ===
- George W. Bond – president of Louisiana Tech University 1929–1936, received his undergraduate degree from University of Arkansas
- Moses T. Clegg – bacteriologist, noted for his work in leprosy
- William T. Dillard – founder of Dillard's Department Stores
- Robert Fisher, PhD – president of Belmont University
- Joe T. Ford – founder and CEO of Alltel
- J. William Fulbright – former president of the University of Arkansas, U.S. senator and founder of the Fulbright Program
- Mary L. Good – past president, American Association for the Advancement of Science
- Jerry Jones – oilman and owner of the Dallas Cowboys
- Walter Keller – developer of the heart pacemaker
- John E. King, PhD – president of the Kansas State Teachers College (now Emporia State University); also president of the University of Wyoming 1966–1967
- Casey Mann and Jennifer McLoud-Mann – mathematicians, discoverer of the 15th and last class of convex pentagons to tile the plane
- Ricardo Martinelli – 36th president of the Republic of Panama, president of Super99 stores
- Robert D. Maurer – inventor of fiber optic technology
- James O. McKinsey – founder of McKinsey & Company
- Mack McLarty – former CEO of Arkla, Inc.; served as White House chief of staff under President Bill Clinton
- Doug McMillon – current CEO of Walmart
- David Wiley Mullins, BA 1931 – served as president of the University of Arkansas and chancellor of North Carolina State University
- Connie Redbird Pinkerman-Uri – doctor and lawyer
- David O. Russell – vice president of Verizon Communications
- Skip Rutherford (born 1950) – first president of the Clinton Foundation, dean of the University of Arkansas Clinton School of Public Service
- Ray Thornton – served as president of the University of Arkansas and Arkansas State University
- John H. Tyson – former CEO and current chairman of Tyson Foods
- Jim Walton – board of directors for Wal-Mart Stores, Inc. and former CEO of Arvest Bank
- S. Robson Walton – chairman of Wal-Mart Stores, Inc.
- Ed Wilson – president of the Fox Broadcasting Company
- Pamela Rouse Wright – businesswoman, jewelry designer, and 46th president general of the Daughters of the American Revolution

=== Sports ===
- Lance Alworth – Hall of Fame wide receiver for the American Football League's San Diego Chargers
- Steve Atwater – 2020 NFL Hall of Fame inductee, eight-time Pro Bowl NFL defensive back
- Corey Beck – retired NBA player
- Andrew Benintendi – current MLB left fielder for the Boston Red Sox
- Patrick Beverley (born 1988) – former NBA, basketball player; now plays for Hapoel Tel Aviv of the Israeli Basketball Premier League
- Ronnie Brewer – former NBA player for the Utah Jazz
- Veronica Campbell – five-time Olympic medal-winning sprinter
- Bubba Carpenter – former MLB outfielder and designated hitter for the Colorado Rockies
- Coty Clarke (born 1992) – basketball player in the Israeli Basketball Premier League
- Mike Conley, Sr. – Olympic silver and gold medalist in triple jump, and holder of US record
- Austin Cook – professional golfer
- John Daly – golfer, won five PGA Tour tournaments, including the PGA Championship and the British Open
- Butch Davis – former head football coach at the North Carolina Tar Heels, Cleveland Browns and Miami Hurricanes
- Calvin Davis – bronze medalist in 400m hurdles at the 1996 Olympics
- Todd Day – former NBA player with the Milwaukee Bucks
- María Fassi – LPGA player and 2019 NCAA national champion
- Joe Ferguson – former quarterback, had a 17-year career in the NFL, primarily with the Buffalo Bills
- Henry Ford – first round draft pick to the Houston Oilers in 1994
- Logan Forsythe – former MLB baseball player with the Texas Rangers
- Jack Haden – football player

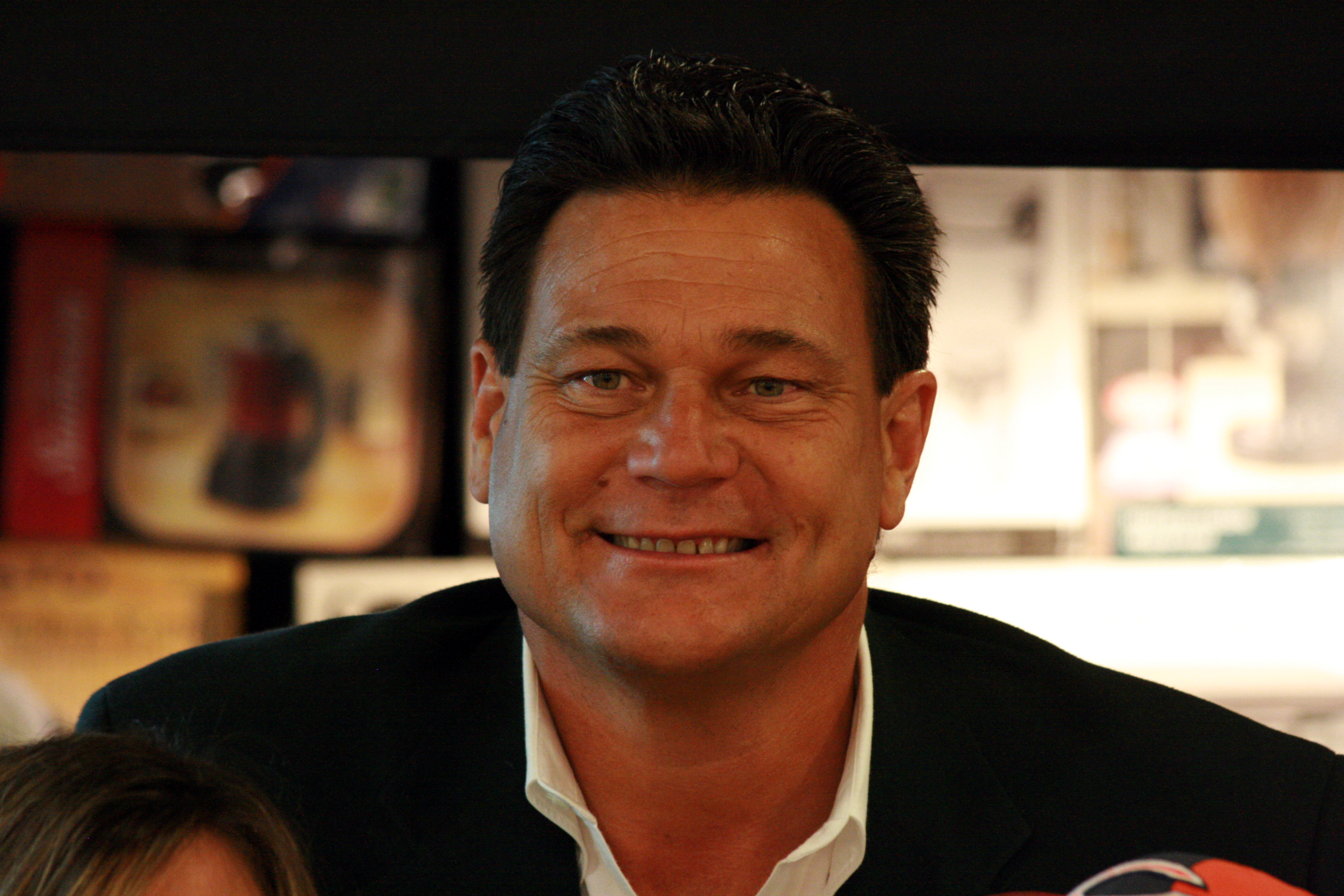
After attending Arkansas, Dan Hampton played for the Chicago Bears of the NFL from 1979 to 1990.

- Dan Hampton – member of Pro Football Hall of Fame
- Dusty Hannahs (born 1993) – basketball player in the Israeli Basketball Premier League
- Wayne Harris – nicknamed "Thumper", Canadian Football Hall of Famer and Grey Cup champion with the Calgary Stampeders
- Madre Hill – SEC Player of the Year, 1995; played in the NFL with the Cleveland Browns and the Oakland Raiders
- Eric Hinske – hitting coach for the Arizona Diamondbacks; won World Series with 2016 Chicago Cubs
- Jim Lee Howell – head coach of the 1956 NFL champion New York Giants
- Jimmy Johnson – former football coach and two-time Super Bowl winner with the Dallas Cowboys; first of two coaches to win an NCAA championship and a Super Bowl; Fox NFL studio analyst
- Joe Johnson – former NBA player for the Brooklyn Nets
- Felix Jones – former NFL player
- Matt Jones – former NFL player
- Deena Kastor – bronze medalist in 2004 Olympic marathon, holder of American women's record for marathon
- Dallas Keuchel – 2015 AL Cy Young Award winner and current MLB free agent
- Jeff King – former MLB player
- Cliff Lee – Cy Young Award-winning MLB pitcher
- Stacy Lewis – 2-time LPGA Golfer of the Year, 2013 Women's British Open Champion
- Jim Lindsey – former NFL player
- Rashad Madden (born 1992) – basketball player in the Israeli National League
- Darren McFadden – former NFL player and two-time Heisman Trophy runner-up
- Oliver Miller – former NBA player
- Sidney Moncrief – Basketball Hall of Fame inductee, inaugural winner of NBA Defensive Player of the Year with Milwaukee Bucks
- Mike Oquist – former MLB player
- Jannero Pargo – professional basketball player for the NBA's Atlanta Hawks
- Michael Qualls (born 1994) – American basketball player for Hapoel Gilboa Galil of the Israeli Basketball Premier League
- Scotty Robertson – former NBA coach; Louisiana Tech University basketball coach 1964–1974, received master's degree from UA
- Howard Sampson – former NFL player
- Clyde Scott – former NFL player and Olympic medalist
- Gerald Skinner – former NFL player
- Justin Smith (born 1999) – basketball player in the Israeli Basketball Premier League
- Barry Switzer – former head coach of the Oklahoma Sooners (3 NCAA Championships) and Dallas Cowboys (1 World Championship); the second of two coaches to win an NCAA Championship and a Super Bowl (the other is former teammate Jimmy Johnson)
- Shelley Taylor-Smith – Australian former long-distance swimmer
- Ethan Tracy – professional golfer
- Clyde Van Sickle – former NFL player
- Darrell Walker – current head coach of Little Rock men's basketball; won NBA title with the 1998 Chicago Bulls
- Chuck Washington – former NFL player
- Tim Webster – former NFL player
- Sonny Weems – former NBA player
- JaCorey Williams (born 1994) – basketball player for Hapoel Jerusalem of the Israeli Basketball Premier League
- Corliss Williamson – 1994 Final Four MOP; retired NBA player
- Ben Winkelman – former NFL player

==== Olympians ====
- Espen Borge – Norway, steeplechase, 1988
- Neil Brooks – Australia, freestyle swimmer, won 4 × 100 m medley relay, 1980, gold
- Niall Bruton – Ireland, 1500 m, 1996
- Kemoy Campbell – Jamaica, 5000 m, 2016
- Veronica Campbell-Brown – Jamaica, 4 × 100 m relay, 2000, silver; 100 m, 2004, bronze, 200 m, 2004, gold; 4 × 100 m relay, 2004, gold; 200 m, 2008, gold, 4 × 100 m relay, 2008; 100 m, 2012, bronze, 200 m, 2012, 4 × 100 m relay, 2012, silver; 200 m, 2016, 4x100 relay, 2016, silver
- Gordon Carpenter – USA, basketball, 1948, gold
- Mike Conley Sr. – USA, triple jump, 1984, silver; triple jump, 1992, gold; triple jump, 1996
- Alistair Cragg – Ireland, 5000 m, 2004; 1500 m and 5000 m, 2008; 5000 m, 2012
- Calvin Davis – USA, 400m hurdles, 1996, bronze
- Paul Donovan – Ireland, 5000 m, 1984; 5000 m, 1992
- Taylor Ellis-Watson – USA, 4 × 400 m relay, 2016, gold
- Edrick Floréal – Canada, triple jump, 1988; long jump, 1992
- Tyson Gay – USA, 4 × 100 m relay and 100 m, 2008; 4 × 100 m relay and 100 m, 2012; 4 × 100 m relay, 2016
- Regina George – Nigeria, 400 m and 4 × 100 m relay, 2012
- Matt Hemingway – USA, high jump, 2004, silver
- Raymond Higgs – Bahamas, long jump, 2012
- Graham Hood – Canada, 1500 m, 1992; 1500 m, 1996
- Robert Howard – USA, triple jump, 1996; triple jump, 2000
- Christine Kalmer – South Africa, marathon, 2016
- Deena Kastor – USA, 10,000 m, 2000; marathon, 2004, bronze; marathon, 2008
- Ivanique Kemp – Bahamas, 100 m hurdles, 2012
- Joe Kleine – USA, basketball, 1984, gold
- Jarrion Lawson – USA, 100 m and 4 × 100 m relay, 2016
- Stacy Lewis – USA, golf, 2016
- Daniel Lincoln – USA, steeplechase, 2004
- David Lingmerth – Sweden, golf, 2016
- Melvin Lister – USA, long jump, 2000; triple jump, 2004
- Gaby López – Mexico, golf, 2016
- Sparkle McKnight – USA, 400 m hurdles, 2016
- Omar McLeod – Jamaica, 110 m hurdles, 2016, gold
- Kerri-Ann Mitchell – Canada, 100 m, 2012
- Lashauntea Moore – USA, 200 m, 2004
- Sandi Morris – USA, pole vault, 2016, silver
- Marek Niit – Estonia, 100 m/200 m, 2012
- Frank O'Mara – Ireland, 5000 m, 1984; 5000 m, 1992; 5000 m, 1996
- Niall O'Shaughnessy – Ireland, 800 m/1500 m, 1976
- Robert C. Pitts – USA, basketball, 1948, gold
- Michael Power – Australia, 5000 m, 2000
- Alvin Robertson – USA, basketball, 1984, gold
- Brandon Rock – USA, 5000 m, 1992
- Jérôme Romain – USA, 1996
- Clyde Scott – USA, 110 m hurdles, 1948, silver
- Dominique Scott – South Africa, 10,000 m, 2016
- Jeremy Scott – USA, pole vault, 2012
- Godfrey Siamusiye – Zambia, 5000 m, 1992; steeplechase, 1996
- Siow Yi Ting – Malaysia, 200 breast, 200 IM and 400 IM, 2000; NA, 2004; NA, 2008
- Wallace Spearmon – USA, 200 m, 2008; 200 m, 2012
- April Steiner Bennett – USA, pole vault, 2008
- Tina Šutej – Slovenia, pole vault, 2012; pole vault, 2016
- Sigrún Brá Sverrisdóttir – Iceland, 200 free, 2008
- Nicole Teter – USA, 800 m, 2004; 800 m, 2008
- Samuel Vázquez – Puerto Rico, 1500 m, 2012
- Lexi Weeks – USA, pole vault, 2016
- Brian Wellman – Bermuda, triple jump, 1988; triple jump, 1992; triple jump, 1996; triple jump, 2000
- Chrishuna Williams – USA, 800 m, 2016
- Hunter Woodhall – USA, 2016 Paralympics, bronze 200m, silver 400m
- Christin Wurth-Thomas – USA, 1500 m, 2008
- Amy Yoder Begley – USA, 10,000 m, 2008

=== Politics, law and military ===
- William Vollie Alexander, Jr., BA 1957 – US representative from Arkansas's 1st district 1969–1993
- Beryl Anthony, BA 1961; JD 1963 – US representative from Arkansas's 4th district 1979–1993
- Morris S. Arnold – senior-status judge of the United States Court of Appeals for the Eighth Circuit, based in Little Rock, former UALR law professor and former chief justice of the Arkansas Supreme Court
- Duncan Baird – Arkansas state budget director since 2015; former member of the Arkansas House of Representatives for Benton County, 2009–2015; unsuccessful candidate for state treasurer in 2014 Republican primary
- Mike Beebe – 45th governor of Arkansas
- Robert Marion Berry, 1964 – US representative from Arkansas's 1st district 1997–2011
- Edwin Bethune – lawyer and lobbyist; member of the United States House of Representatives from Arkansas's 2nd district 1979–1985
- John Boozman, 1974 (only attended one year) – US representative from Arkansas's 3rd district 2001–2011; US senator from Arkansas since 2011
- Drew Bowers, 1906 – Arkansas lawyer and Republican gubernatorial nominee in 1926 and 1928; obtained a teacher's certificate from the university
- David Branscum, 1982 – Republican member of the Arkansas House of Representatives from Searcy County since 2011
- Maurice Britt – World War II Medal of Honor recipient, NFL player, lieutenant governor of Arkansas
- Charles Hillman Brough – governor of Arkansas 1917–1921; UA faculty member
- Dale Bumpers – 37th governor of Arkansas and senator representing Arkansas 1975–1999
- John Burkhalter, Civil Engineering 1980 – former chairman of both the Arkansas Economic Development Commission and Arkansas Highway Commission; unsuccessful Democratic nominee for lieutenant governor in 2014
- Francis Cherry – 35th governor of Arkansas

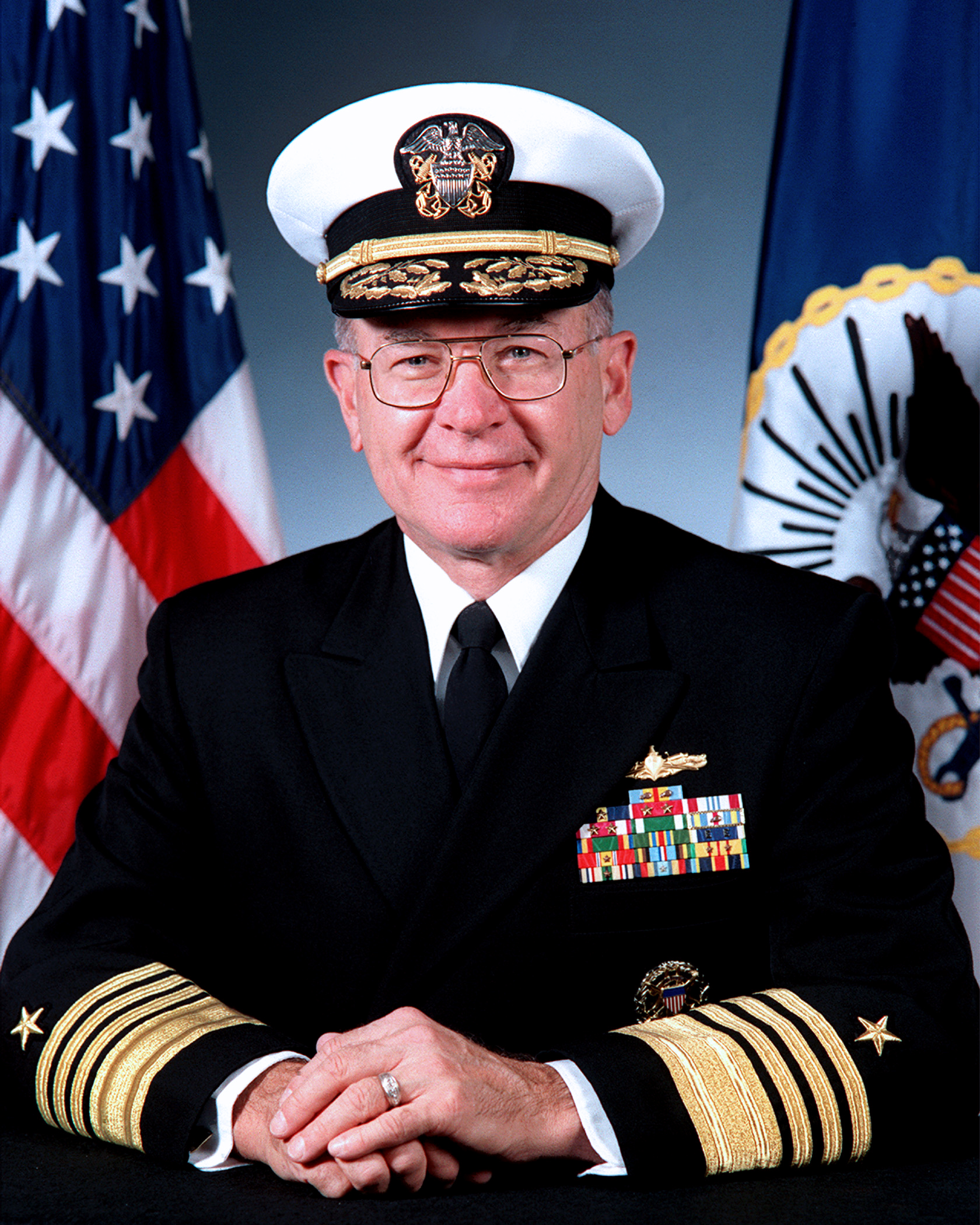
Admiral Vern Clark, chief of Naval Operations for the United States Navy

- Admiral Vern E. Clark – chief of Naval Operations, United States Navy
- Sterling R. Cockrill – businessman, politician, urban planner, and artist; Speaker of the Arkansas House of Representatives 1967–1968
- Donald L. Corbin – associate justice for the Arkansas Supreme Court
- William Fadjo Cravens – US representative from Arkansas's 4th district 1939–1949
- Paul Danielson – associate justice for the Arkansas Supreme Court
- Jeff Davis – Democratic US senator from Arkansas and the 20th governor of Arkansas
- Jesse C. Deen – member of the Louisiana House of Reprsentatives
- Jay Dickey, J.D. 1963 – US representative from Arkansas's 4th district 1993–2001
- George Washington Donaghey – 22nd governor of Arkansas
- Clyde T. Ellis, BS '31; JD '34 – US representative from Arkansas's 3rd district 1939–1943
- General Carlton D. Everhart II, M.S. 1989 – commander, Air Mobility Command
- Charlene Fite, master's in Education – Republican member of the Arkansas House of Representatives from Crawford County
- Scott Flippo, BBA 2003 – incoming Republican member of the Arkansas State Senate from Baxter, Boone, and Marion counties
- John C. Floyd, BS 1879 – US representative from Arkansas's 3rd district 1905–1915
- Clay Ford, BS Finance 1969 – member of both the Arkansas (1975–1976) and Florida House of Representatives (2007–2013) from Pulaski and Santa Rosa counties, respectively
- J. William Fulbright, BA '25 – US senator, US representative, creator of the Fulbright Scholar Program and president of the University of Arkansas
- Junius Marion Futrell – 30th governor of Arkansas
- Ezekiel C. Gathings, JD 1929 – US representative from Arkansas's 1st district 1939–1969
- William S. Goodwin – US representative from Arkansas's 7th district 1911–1921
- John Paul Hammerschmidt, BA '41 – US representative from Arkansas's 3rd district 1967–1993
- Jim Hannah – chief justice of the Arkansas Supreme Court
- Mike Haridopolos – former president of the Florida Senate, former member of the Florida House of Representatives
- Brooks Hays, BA 1919 – U.S. representative from Arkansas's 5th District 1943–1959, president of the Southern Baptist Convention
- Pat Hays – former mayor of North Little Rock, Arkansas, Arkansas state representative
- Jim Hendren, Class of 1984, B.S. in Electrical Engineering – Arkansas Republican state senator since 2013, former member of the Arkansas House of Representatives
- George Howard, Jr. – first African-American federal judge in Arkansas
- Asa Hutchinson – 46th governor of Arkansas; US representative from Arkansas's 3rd district 1997–2001
- Donna Hutchinson, Master of Education – member of the Arkansas House of Representatives from Benton County
- Tim Hutchinson – US senator representing Arkansas 1997–2003; US representative representing Arkansas's 3rd district 1993–1997
- Bob Johnson, M.S. Accounting – Democratic member of the Arkansas House of Representatives for Pulaski County since 2015; former justice of the peace
- Lee Johnson, MD – politician from Arkansas
- Richard C. Johnston, MS '89 – US Air Force general
- Bryan King – Republican member of the Arkansas Senate for the fifth district
- Wade Kitchens, 1898 – U.S. congressman, 1937–1941
- Jack Ladyman, B.S. Engineering – Republican member of the Arkansas House of Representatives for Craighead County since 2015
- Lynn Lowe, B.S. Engineering 1959 – former Republican state chairman and gubernatorial nominee, 1978, and Texarkana farmer
- Mark Lowery, master's in Communications 2000 – member of the Arkansas House of Representatives from Pulaski County since 2013
- Robin Lundstrum, three degrees in education and health science – Republican member of the Arkansas House of Representatives for Benton and Washington counties since 2015
- Mark R. Martin, BS Engineering 1998 – Arkansas secretary of state, former member of the Arkansas House of Representatives from Washington County
- John Ellis Martineau – 28th governor of Arkansas
- Ricardo Martinelli – president of the Republic of Panama
- Hayes McClerkin, LLB '59 – speaker of the Arkansas House, 1969–1970; Texarkana attorney
- Sid McMath – decorated US Marine, 34th governor of Arkansas, top personal injury attorney (president, International Academy of Trial Lawyers, 1977–78); built University of Arkansas for Medical Sciences, defeated Dixiecrats in Arkansas and opposed Governor Faubus
- Edwin L. Mechem – Republican governor of the State of New Mexico
- John Isaac Moore – member of the Arkansas Senate and acting governor of Arkansas
- Kendra Moore, MBA – member of the Arkansas house of Representatives
- Micah Neal, BS 1997 – member of the Arkansas House of Representatives from Springdale
- Catherine Dorris Norrell, BA 1925 – US representative representing Arkansas's 6th district 1961–1963; director of the United States Department of State 1965–1969
- Willie Oates, BA 1941 – member of the Arkansas House of Representatives, 1959–1960
- Danny L. Patrick, bachelor's, master's, specialist degrees in Education – member of the Arkansas House of Representatives from Madison and Carroll counties, 1967–1970
- Xenophon Overton Pindall – 21st governor of Arkansas
- Odell Pollard, JD 1950 – Searcy attorney and state Republican chairman, 1966–1970
- David Pryor, BA 1957; JD 1964 – 39th governor of Arkansas 1975–1979, US senator 1979–1997, and US representative from Arkansas's 4th district 1966–1973

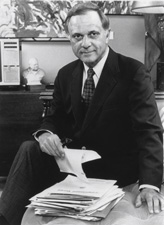
David Pryor

- Mark Pryor, BA 1985; JD 1988 – US senator representing Arkansas
- Joe Purcell – 40th governor of Arkansas, Arkansas attorney general, and lieutenant governor
- Chad Puryear – member of the Arkansas House of Representatives
- Heartsill Ragon, BA 1905 – US representative from Arkansas's 5th district 1923–1933
- Carol Rasco, BS circa 1970 – director of the Domestic Policy Council under President Bill Clinton; advocate for disability rights, education, and children
- James B. Reed, JD 1909 – US representative from Arkansas's former 6th district, 1923–1929
- Charles C. Reid, BA 1885 – US representative from Arkansas's 4th district 1901–1903
- Bob C. Riley – 38th governor of Arkansas
- Joseph Robinson – 23rd governor of Arkansas and senator representing Arkansas 1913–1937; US representative from Arkansas's 6th district 1903–1913
- Laurie Rushing – real estate broker from Hot Springs, Republican member of the Arkansas House of Representatives for Garland and Hot Spring counties since 2013
- Rodney Slater – former US secretary of transportation
- Lieutenant General Martin R. Steele – United States Marine Corps lieutenant general
- Gary Stubblefield – dairy farmer from Franklin County; member of the Arkansas State Senate since 2013; member of Arkansas House 2011–2013
- Boyd Anderson Tackett, JD 1935 – US representative from Arkansas's 4th district 1949–1953
- Tom Jefferson Terral – 27th governor of Arkansas, 1925–1927
- David D. Terry, JD 1903 – US representative from Arkansas's 5th district 1933–1943
- Ray Thornton, JD 1956 – US representative from Arkansas's 2nd district 1991–1997; 4th district 1973–1979; Arkansas Attorney General 1971–1973; president of the University of Arkansas System 1984–1990
- John N. Tillman, BA 1880; JD 1883 – US representative from Arkansas's 3rd district 1945–1967; president of the University of Arkansas 1905–1912
- James William Trimble, BA 1917; JD 1925 – US representative from Arkansas's 3rd district 1945–1967
- Jim Guy Tucker, JD 1968 – 43rd governor of Arkansas, US representative from Arkansas's 2nd district 1977–1979; Arkansas Attorney General 1973–1977
- Bolon B. Turner, BA 1922 – judge of the United States Tax Court (1934–1962)
- Elana Wills – associate justice for the Arkansas Supreme Court
- Jon Woods, B.S. in Marketing Management 2002 – Arkansas Republican state representative and senator 2007–2017, record producer, musician
- Marshall Wright, bachelor's and JD – Democratic member of the Arkansas House of Representatives for St. Francis, Woodruff, Lee, and Monroe counties

== Faculty ==
- David A. Bednar – faculty in the College of Business Administration (1980–97), president of Brigham Young University–Idaho (1997–2004), LDS Church apostle (2004–)
- Bill Clinton – faculty in the School of Law (1973–76), 50th attorney general of Arkansas (1977–1979), 40th and 42nd governor of Arkansas (1979–81, 1983–92), 42nd president of the United States (1993–2001)
- Hillary Clinton – faculty in the School of Law (1974–76), First Lady of the United States (1992–2001), U.S. senator (D–NY) (2001–09), 67th U.S. secretary of state (2009–13)
- Mounir Farah – professor emeritus of education and Middle Eastern studies
- Ellen Gilchrist – fiction writer, professor of creative writing and contemporary fiction
- Molly Giles – fiction writer, professor of fiction writing
- Varun Grover – Walton professor and chair of the Department of Information Systems, noted for his information systems research
- Donald Harington – fiction writer, professor of art history (1986–2008)
- William Harrison – screenwriter and author of Roller Ball Murder (later adapted into Rollerball) and the novelization of Brubaker
- F.A. Hayek – Nobel laureate in Economics; visiting professor (1949–50)
- E. Fay Jones – first dean of the School of Architecture, architect of Thorncrown Chapel, AIA Gold Medal recipient
- Eleanor King – professor emeritus (1952–1971); principal dancer and choreographer from the early days of American modern dance
- Miller Williams – faculty in the Department of English (1970–2015) including time as a professor emeritus of literature, poet, recipient of the Poets' Prize and National Arts Award
- Charles W. Woodworth – entomologist and botanist at the Arkansas Agricultural Experiment Station (1888–91), namesake of C. W. Woodworth Award

== University presidents ==
Until 1982, the president was the chief administrative officer of the Fayetteville campus. After 1982, the position of chancellor was created to be the top administrator at the Fayetteville campus, and the title of president referred to the University of Arkansas System.

| President | Tenure |
|---|---|
| Noah P. Gates | 1871–1873 |
| Albert W. Bishop | 1873–1875 |
| Noah P. Gates | 1875–1877 |
| Daniel Harvey Hill | 1877–1884 |
| George M. Edgar | 1884–1887 |
| Edward H. Murfee | 1887–1894 |
| John L. Buchanan | 1894–1902 |
| Henry S. Hartzog | 1902–1905 |
| John N. Tillman | 1905–1912 |
| John Hugh Reynolds (acting) | 1912–1913 |
| John C. Futrall | 1913–1939 |
| J. William Fulbright | 1939–1941 |
| Arthur M. Harding | 1941–1947 |
| Lewis Webster Jones | 1947–1951 |
| John T. Caldwell | 1952–1959 |
| Storm Whaley (acting) | 1959–1960 |
| David Wiley Mullins | 1960–1974 |
| Charles E. Bishop | 1974–1980 |
| James E. Martin* | 1980–1982 |

*Martin continued to serve as president of the University of Arkansas System after 1982.

== University chancellors ==
Up until 1982, the president was the chief administrative officer of the Fayetteville campus. After 1982, the position of chancellor was created to be the top administrator at the Fayetteville campus.

| Chancellor | Tenure |
|---|---|
| B.A. Nugent | 1982–1983 |
| Willard Gatewood | 1984–1985 |
| Daniel Ferritor | 1986–1997 |
| John A. White | 1997–2008 |
| Dr. G. David Gearhart | 2008–2015 |
| Joseph E. Steinmetz | 2016–2021 |
| Charles F. Robinson, Ph.D. | 2022–present |
