= Ernie Deane =

American journalist

E. C. ('Ernie') Deane (1911–1991) was an American journalist and academic.

Deane was born in Arkansas. He received a BA in journalism from the University of Arkansas in 1934, studying under Walter J. Lemke, and an MA in journalism from Northwestern University in 1935. He was General George Patton's information officer during World War II. Discharged in 1946, he returned to Germany as an Army press officer for the Nuremberg Military Tribunals. Returning to Arkansas, he stood in as Arkansas Gazette for Harry Ashmore, who was working for Adlai Stevenson's presidential campaign. Upon Ashmore's return to the newspaper, Deane started writing a column which ran for a decade, Arkansas Traveller, and also taught journalism at the University of Arkansas. Deane served as a member of the Arkansas History Commission 1974–1990, and left them his extensive photography collection.
