= Evergreen Cemetery (Fayetteville, Arkansas) =

Historic cemetery in Arkansas, United States

- U.S. National Register of Historic Places
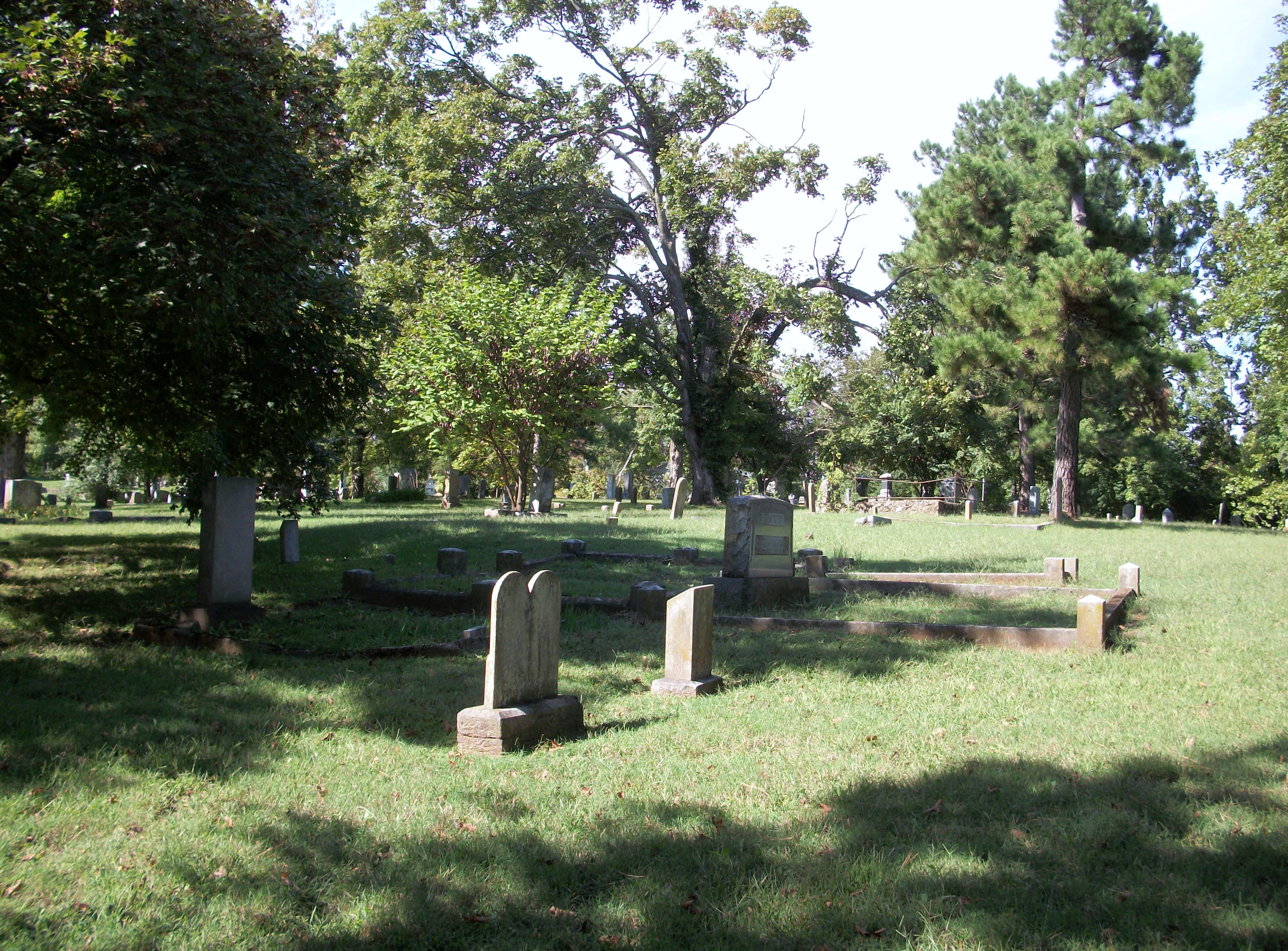
- Evergreen Cemetery

- Location within Arkansas Location within the United States
- Location: Jct. of Center, University and Whiteside Sts., Fayetteville, Arkansas
- Coordinates: 36°3′51″N 94°10′9″W
- Area: 4.5 acres (1.8 ha)
- Built: 1847
- NRHP reference No.: 97001279
- Added to NRHP: October 30, 1997

Evergreen Cemetery, located at William and University Streets in Fayetteville, Arkansas, is one of the largest early historic cemeteries in the region, with burials dating to 1838. Evergreen is included in the National Register of Historic Places for its age, and because numerous important historical figures are buried there. These include Senator J. William Fulbright, Governor Archibald Yell, educator Sophia Sawyer, industrialist Lafayette Gregg, and many others.

The cemetery was founded as a private cemetery by John Thomas in the late 1830s or early 1840s. Later it was owned by the local Masonic Lodge and Independent Order of Odd Fellows chapter. These organizations deeded the cemetery to the city in 1871. It is currently owned and operated by the Fayetteville Evergreen Cemetery Association.

== Internments ==
- Walter J. Lemke, journalist and artist who led University of Arkansas' journalism program and for whom it is named
- Sophia Sawyer, missionary and educator who found Fayetteville Female Seminary. She was re-interred at the cemetery

== See also ==
- National Register of Historic Places listings in Washington County, Arkansas
