= Fulbright College =

Fulbright College or Fulbright School may refer to:

- Fullbright College in Puerto Princesa, Palawan, Philippines
- J. William Fulbright College of Arts and Sciences, at the University of Arkansas
- Fulbright University Vietnam, in Ho Chi Minh City
