= Claude A. Fuller =

American politician (1876–1968)

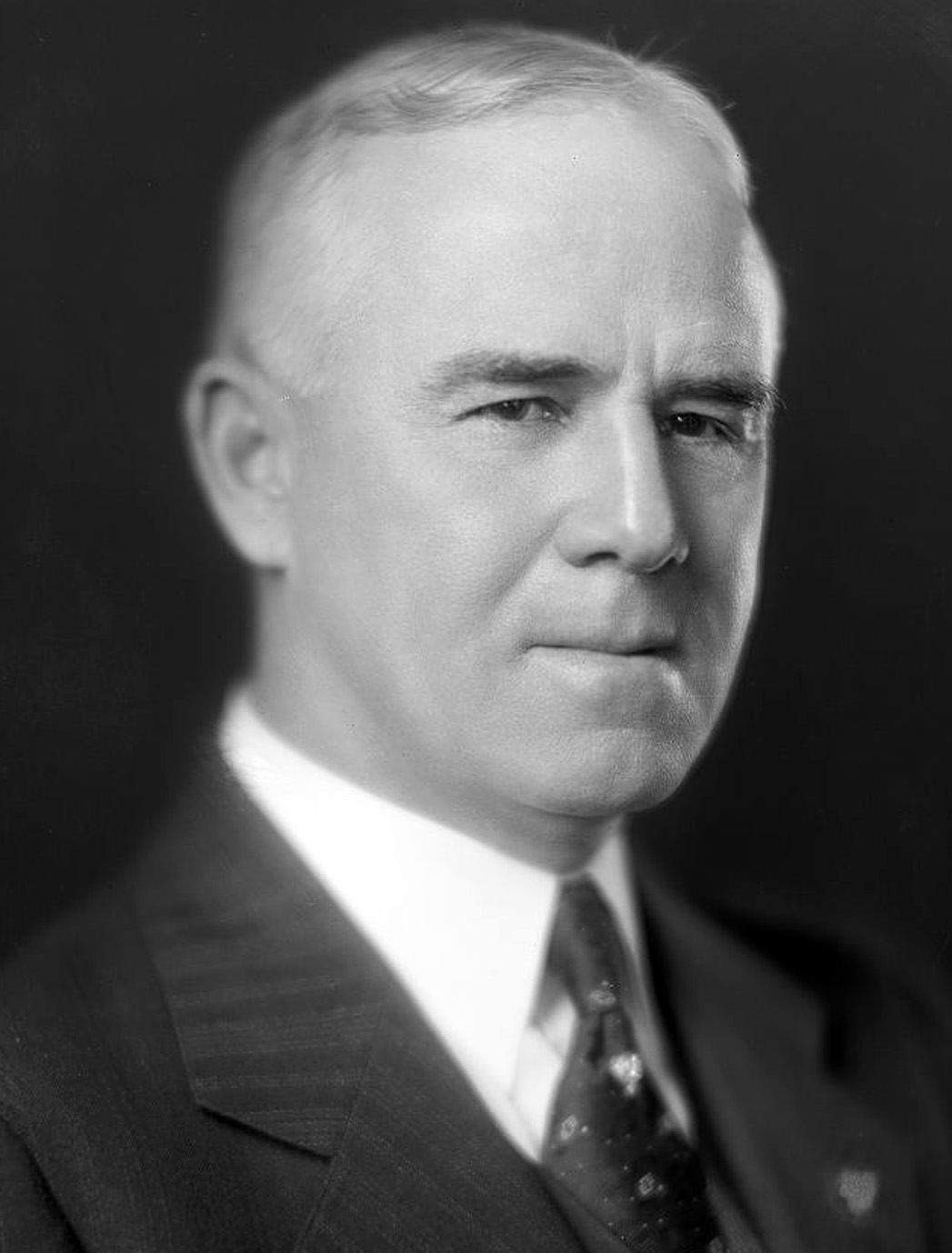

Member of the U.S. House of Representatives from Arkansas's 3rd district
- In office March 4, 1929 – January 3, 1939
- Preceded by: John N. Tillman
- Succeeded by: Clyde T. Ellis

Mayor of Eureka Springs
- In office 1920–1928
- In office 1906–1910

Member of the Arkansas House of Representatives
- In office 1903–1905

Personal details
- Born: Claude Albert Fuller; January 20, 1876 Prophetstown, Illinois, U.S.
- Died: January 8, 1968 (aged 91) Eureka Springs, Arkansas, U.S.
- Party: Democratic
- Spouse: May Obenshain (m. 1899)
- Children: 3
- Occupation: Politician; lawyer; farmer

Claude Albert Fuller (January 20, 1876 – January 8, 1968) was an American politician, lawyer, and farmer. A member of the Democratic Party, he served in the Arkansas House of Representatives from 1903 to 1905, and of the U.S. House of Representatives for the 3rd District of Arkansas from 1929 to 1939.

== Early life ==
Fuller was born on January 20, 1876, in Prophetstown, Whiteside County, Illinois to Wilmont P. and Maria (Ocobock) Fuller. In 1885 he moved to Arkansas with his parents, who settled on a farm near Eureka Springs.

He attended the public schools. He worked as a boot black and as a janitor at the school where he enrolled. He dropped out of high school, took a better job in Chicago for a while and saved his money. Desiring to be a lawyer, he finished high school in Eureka Springs in 1896 at the age of twenty; went back to Chicago to attend the Kent School of Law; and returned to Eureka Springs to study law at the office of C. G. White.

He then took the bar examination in open court, and on February 5, 1898, he was admitted to the bar and became a practicing lawyer.

== Career ==
Becoming city clerk of Eureka Springs from 1898 to 1902, Fuller was then elected member of the State house of representatives from 1903 to 1905. He was mayor of Eureka Springs from 1906 to 1910 and from 1920 to 1928. He served as prosecuting attorney of the fourth Arkansas judicial district from 1910 to 1914, and as president of the Eureka Springs School Board from 1916 to 1928. He was a delegate to all Democratic State conventions from 1903 to 1943. He was also delegate to the Democratic National Conventions in 1908, 1912, and others from 1924 to 1960.

Elected as a Democrat to the Seventy-first and to the four succeeding Congresses from March 4, 1929 to January 3, 1939. An unsuccessful candidate for renomination in 1938, he continued to practice law in Eureka Springs and was president of the Bank of Eureka Springs from 1930 until his death.

== Personal life and death ==
He married May Obenshain on December 25, 1899, and they had three children, one of whom died in infancy.

Fuller died in Eureka Springs, Arkansas, on January 8, 1968. Interment at Odd Fellows Cemetery, Eureka Springs, Arkansas.

U.S. House of Representatives
Preceded by John N. Tillman	Member of the U.S. House of Representatives from Arkansas's 3rd congressional district 1929–1939	Succeeded by Clyde T. Ellis
