= Sophia Sawyer =

American educator (1792–1854)

- Born: May 4 or 5, 1792; Fitchburg, Massachusetts, United States
- Died: February 22, 1854 (aged 61); Fayetteville, Arkansas, United States
- Resting place: Evergreen Cemetery
- Occupation: Teacher

Sophia Sawyer (born May 4 or 5, 1792 in Fitchburg, Massachusetts; died February 22, 1854, in Fayetteville, Arkansas) was an American educator. She taught in Cherokee mission schools and founded the Fayetteville Female Seminary.

== Early life and education ==
Sophia Sawyer was born in Fitchburg, Massachusetts, on May 4, 1792, one of six children born to Abner and Betsy Sawyer, impoverished farmers. After her parents' death, she worked in Rindge, New Hampshire, as housemaid for Dr. Seth Payson, who helped her secure a sporadic education at the New Ipswich Academy. From 1820 to 1822, she attended Joseph Emerson’s female seminary in Byfield, Massachusetts and ultimately earned a certificate to teach primary school.

== Career ==
As an educator, Sawyer was known to be a "first-class regulator" and "commanding officer" from whom students would scatter when she entered a room. Those around her also described her changes in mood and temper. One teacher who worked with her for a short while stated she would be "one day full of hope and perfectly delighted with the signs of progress of the pupils, and perhaps the very next day perfectly disconsolate about the school, thinking nobody was doing their duty." Despite disagreements about her mood and character, people seemed to agree that she was a skilled educator. Fellow educator Ann James wrote, "She was exceedingly visionary [...] Miss Sawyer taught a primary school for years and taught thoroughly, for she was not woman to leave any work she undertook half done [...] She was a woman of indomitable energy and perseverance. She could do the work of three."

=== Early career ===
Circa 1821, Sawyer became a missionary teacher with the American Board of Commissioners for Foreign Missions (ABCFM).

On November 21, 1823, Sawyer arrived at the Brainerd Mission, a Christian mission to the Cherokee in present-day Chattanooga, Tennessee. By the following year, she expressed interest in developing a school similar to the Byfield Female Seminary for instructing Indigenous girls. She wrote many letters to the ABCFM about her experiences teaching and showed great enthusiasm for both women's and Indigenous people's education. During this time, she taught students to read and began gaining increasing knowledge for teaching other subjects, including geography, arithmetic, and astronomy. Due to differences in opinion, Sawyer was transferred to Haweis, Georgia in 1828.

By the following year, Sawyer to New Echota, Georgia due to further differences in opinion, though this time she did so of her own volition. There, she opened a day school teaching Cherokee, African American, and white students. She also met Cherokee leader John Ridge and his wife, Sarah Bird Northrup Ridge, as well as Elias Boudinot and his family. While in Georgia, Sawyer defied state law by providing education to two African-American slaves who were owned by Cherokee individuals. She avoided arrest by asserting that she was on Cherokee territory and therefore subject to Cherokee law rather than Georgia law.

Pressures began rising in 1828 after gold was found on Cherokee territory in the state, and by March 1834, the school officially closed. In considering her next move, Sawyer had to consider either staying in Georgia as a mission teacher with the ABCFM or continuing work beyond them. Those who worked with and reported on her work to the ABCFM indicated she was a great teacher, but they questioned her character as a missionary; Samuel Worcester, who watched over her, indicated "her character [was] a strange compound of inconsistencies, exhibiting some traits which appeared like decided evidence of Christian character, and other [sic] which [...] appear perfectly incompatible with the existence of true piety". The Cherokee families she worked with did not have the same concerns, so in December 1834, Sawyer ended up relocating with the Ridge family to Running Water, Tennessee.

While in Running Water, Sawyer established another school, though it closed by 1836 as the Ridge family moved farther west. For approximately one year, Sawyer made arrangements in New England before following the Ridge family to Honey Creek, Missouri. There, she felt settled and tranquil, and Ridge established a schoolhouse for her to teach Cherokee youth.

During this time, other Cherokee individuals voted to invoke blood law against Cherokee leaders who had signed the Treaty of New Echota, which sold Cherokee land in Georgia for land west of the Mississippi. Among those who had signed the treaty were John Ridge, and on June 22, 1839, several Cherokee individuals came to Honey Creek and killed Ridge, Ridge's father (Major Ridge), and Elias Boudinot. After Ridge's death, Sawyer and Sarah Ridge relocated to Fayetteville, Arkansas, arriving on July 1, 1839.

=== Fayetteville Female Seminary ===
After arriving in Fayetteville, Arkansas in 1839, Sawyer began planning to establish a school. Now separate from the ABCFM, she did not have to conform to Christian standards and could envision a different type of school, mirroring what she had experienced at Emerson's Byfield Female Seminary, as well as what she knew about the newly established Mount Holyoke Female Seminary, which had been founded by classmate Mary Lyon.

Fayetteville Female Seminary soon welcomed its first class of students; some sources indicate that the school first taught only boys while others state the first class included 14 girls from prominent Cherokee families, though by 1841, sources agree the school taught only girls. At first, the school moved buildings, but by fall of 1840, Sawyer had developed a strong enough reputation to receive land upon which to build a permanent structure. For the first eight years, Sawyer taught all academic subjects, though she eventually hired more teachers given that she was only certified to teach primary school.

In 1845, the Arkansas Intelligencer wrote that the school's "system of teaching is better adapted to perfect the education of youth than any other in this State, and [...] is as good as that of any other.

== Death ==
Sawyer died on February 22, 1854, after living with tuberculosis for many years. Though she was initially buried on the Fayetteville Female Seminary school grounds, she was eventually re-interred in Evergreen Cemetery.
