= Eureka Springs Cemetery =

Historic cemetery in Eureka Springs, Arkansas, United States

- U.S. National Register of Historic Places
- Location within Arkansas Location within the United States
- Location: NW of jct. of Cty. Rd. 205 & US 62 E, Eureka Springs, Arkansas
- Area: 46.5 acres (18.8 ha)
- Built: 1889
- NRHP reference No.: 100002535
- Added to NRHP: June 8, 2018

The Eureka Springs Cemetery is a historic cemetery located at the junction of County Road 205 and United States Route 62 in Eureka Springs, Arkansas. It is 46.5 acres (18.8 ha) in size, and contains an unusual variation of urban and rural layout and burial practices. It was founded in 1889 by the local chapter of the International Order of Odd Fellows (IOOF), which managed it until 1965, when it was acquired by the city. The land was originally owned by the Lamar family, which used it as a family cemetery at least as early as 1880.

The cemetery was listed on the National Register of Historic Places in 2018.

It is the resting place of US Congressman Claude A. Fuller (1876–1968).

== See also ==
- National Register of Historic Places listings in Carroll County, Arkansas
