= Eros, Louisiana =

- Town
- Town of Eros
- Location of Eros in Jackson Parish, Louisiana.

- Location of Louisiana in the United States
- Coordinates: 32°23′33″N 92°25′26″W
- Country: United States
- State: Louisiana
- Parish: Jackson

Government
  - Type: Mayor

Area
  - Total: 1.00 sq mi (2.58 km^{2})
  - Land: 1.00 sq mi (2.58 km^{2})
  - Water: 0 sq mi (0.00 km^{2})
- Elevation: 207 ft (63 m)

Population (2020)
  - Total: 130
  - Density: 131/sq mi (50.4/km^{2})
- Time zone: UTC-6 (CST)
  - Summer (DST): UTC-5 (CDT)
- Area code: 318
- FIPS code: 22-24215
- GNIS feature ID: 2406458

Eros is a town in Jackson Parish, Louisiana, United States. The population was 130 at the 2020 Census It is part of the Ruston Micropolitan Statistical Area.

== History ==
The Tremont Lumber company founded Eros, in the early 20th century. Mrs. Mary Collins, née Nash (wife of Samuel Collins) suggested that the sawmill boomtown be named after the 433 Eros Asteroid (discovered in 1898). Eros served as a center point for a number of small surrounding communities, such as Hog Hair, Jumping Vernon, Indian Village, Salem Guyton, Flat Creek, Head Settlement, Vernon, Fuller Town, and Bug Tussle. Most children in these communities were sent to study at the Eros school, and citizens would normally receive their mail through rural mail coming from Eros. Box suppers would be held for various causes, making Eros a social center.

Naturally by 1920, the town became the largest in the Jackson Parish, with "a thousand residents, having a post office, three hotels, a newspaper, a company commissary, three doctors, a drug store, three churches, a jail, a bank, its own telephone exchange and Jackson Parish's first high school with six hundred pupils" (Busbice, 6). A cyclone though devastated the town in 1920, destroying the sawmill. The sawmill was rebuilt, but yet again in 1926 a fire burned it to the ground. After that, the mill company felt that most of the timber had been harvested anyway, and moved their center of operation to Olla, Louisiana. Only a few hundred citizens stayed to maintain the town.

== Geography ==
According to the United States Census Bureau, the town has a total area of 1.0 square mile (2.6 km^{2}), all land.

== Demographics ==
Historical population
Census	Pop.	Note	%±
1910	898		—
1920	1,184		31.8%
1930	203		−82.9%
1940	289		42.4%
1950	195		−32.5%
1960	176		−9.7%
1970	164		−6.8%
1980	158		−3.7%
1990	177		12.0%
2000	202		14.1%
2010	155		−23.3%
2020	130		−16.1%
2025 (est.)	141	▲	8.5%
U.S. Decennial Census

As of the census of 2000, there were 202 people, 77 households, and 60 families residing in the town. The population density was 202.8 inhabitants per square mile (78.3/km^{2}). There were 87 housing units at an average density of 87.3 per square mile (33.7/km^{2}). The racial makeup of the town was 99.50% White and 0.50% Native American.

There were 77 households, out of which 31.2% had children under the age of 18 living with them, 61.0% were married couples living together, 10.4% had a female householder with no husband present, and 20.8% were non-families. 16.9% of all households were made up of individuals, and 5.2% had someone living alone who was 65 years of age or older. The average household size was 2.62 and the average family size was 2.92.

In the town, the population was spread out, with 25.7% under the age of 18, 9.4% from 18 to 24, 25.7% from 25 to 44, 25.7% from 45 to 64, and 13.4% who were 65 years of age or older. The median age was 38 years. For every 100 females, there were 106.1 males. For every 100 females age 18 and over, there were 105.5 males.

The median income for a household in the town was $20,313, and the median income for a family was $23,750. Males had a median income of $27,969 versus $16,250 for females. The per capita income for the town was $10,789. About 21.3% of families and 24.1% of the population were below the poverty line, including 22.9% of those under the age of eighteen and 19.0% of those 65 or over.

== Notable person ==
- The late State Representative Jesse C. Deen of Bossier Parish, was born in Eros.

== Sources ==
- Busbice, Wayne E. and Patricia. Uncovering the Secrets of a Southern Family, a Memoir. Bloomington, Indiana: AuthorHouse. 2007. Print.
