= Fayetteville Female Seminary =

Former school for girls in Fayetteville, Arkansas

Coordinates: 36.0617°N 94.1635°W

Information
- Established: 1839
- Founders: Sophia Sawyer; Sarah Ridge
- Closed: 1862
- Gender: Girls (primarily, some male day students)

Fayetteville Female Seminary, established in 1839 by Sophia Sawyer, was a school for girls in Fayetteville, Arkansas. It offered quality education for both white and Cherokee women at a time when women's access to schooling was limited and segregated schooling was common. While the seminary operated only from 1839 to 1862, its legacy is often linked to the decision to establish the University of Arkansas in Fayetteville. A historical marker commemorates its history. Walter J. Lemke's drawings of the school and Sawyer were printed in a newspaper.

== Founders ==
Fayetteville Female Seminary was founded in 1839 by Sophia Sawyer and Sarah Ridge.

Sophie Sawyer was raised in Rindge, New Hampshire. She later became a missionary and tutored prominent Cherokee individuals. She eventually connected with John Ridge and moved with him and his family to present-day Missouri. After his death, she and Ridge's widow, Sarah Bird Northrup Ridge, relocated to Fayetteville, Arkansas, arriving on July 1, 1839.

Sarah Ridge was the widow of John Ridge, a Cherokee politician.

== History ==
In 1839, Fayetteville Female Seminary welcomed its first class of students, which included 14 girls from prominent Cherokee families. Classes were initially held in a log structure, then relocated to a retail store. According to myth, a thespian society met on the first floor, and Sawyer diligently watched over her students to protect them from "any adverse influence or potential moral degradation stemming from the less strict ethical standards associated with actors". Within a year, the class grew to include 50 students, including male day students. Due to the school's success, Judge David Walker provided Sawyer land upon which to build a permanent structure.

Sawyer maintained her connection with the American Board of Missions, though the school operated independently.

For the first eight years, she taught all academic subjects, though she was only certified to teach primary school. As such, she eventually hired more teachers, including Reverend Cephas Washburn.

Following Sawyer's death in 1854, Lucretia Foster Smith became the school's principal. The school was incorporated in 1859, though it closed in 1862 after being torched following the Battle of Prairie Grove.

The school closed during the American Civil War. A list of students from 1859 exists.

== Legacy ==
Fayetteville Female Seminary school is believed to have helped influence the siting of the University of Arkansas in Fayetteville in the 1870s.

The Butler Center for Arkansas Studies has an engraving of the school.

A historical marker commemorates its history.
