= J. William Fulbright College of Arts and Sciences =

Liberal arts college at the University of Arkansas

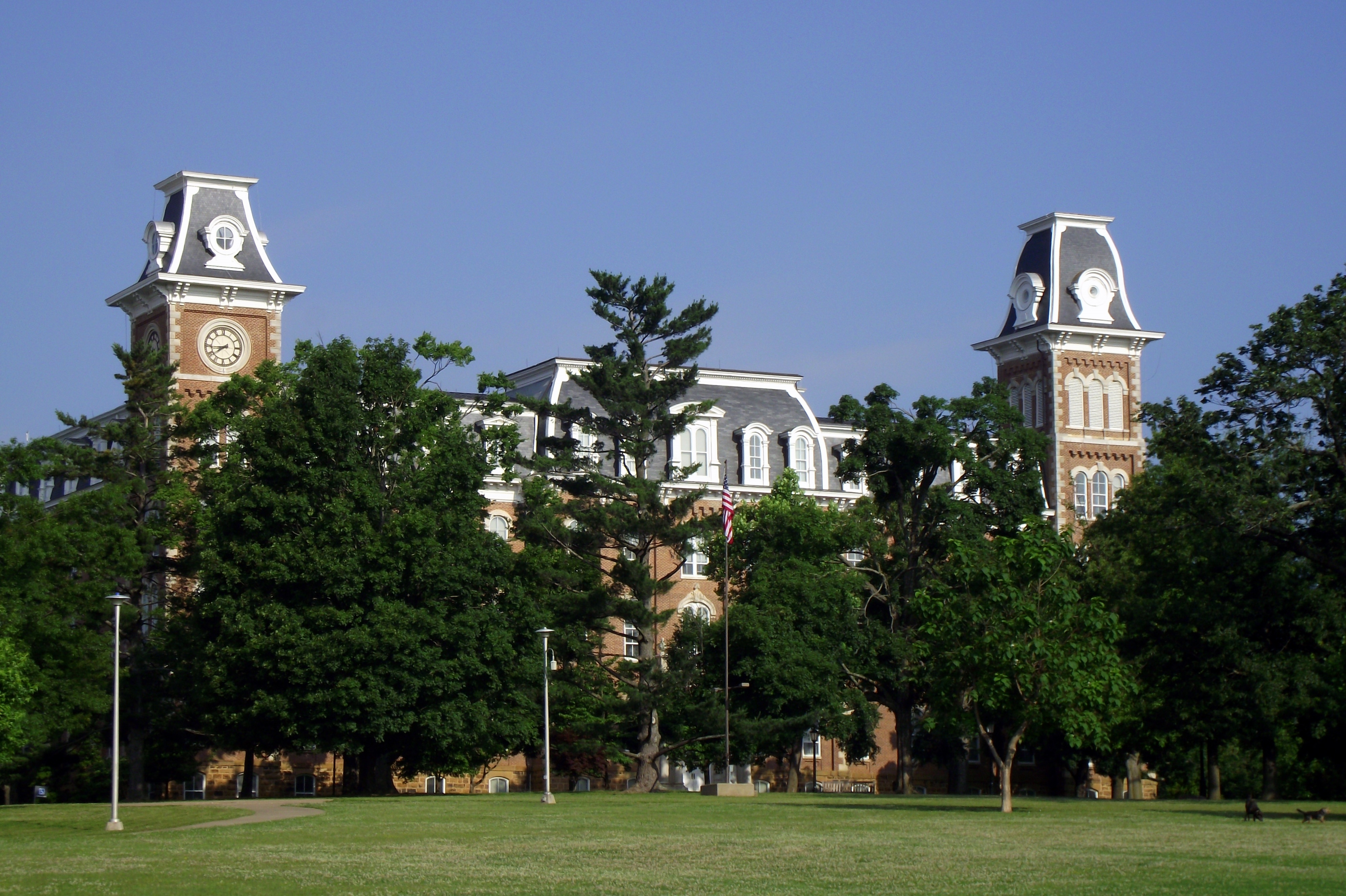
- Old Main, home to the Office of the Dean of the College and administrative staff
- Type: Public
- Established: 1912
- Affiliations: University of Arkansas
- Dean: Brian E. Raines
- Students: 8,025 (2017)
- Undergraduates: 7,113 (2017)
- Postgraduates: 912 (2017)
- Location: Fayetteville, Arkansas, U.S. 36°04′07″N 94°10′34″W
- Campus: University of Arkansas
- Website: fulbright.uark.edu

The J. William Fulbright College of Arts and Sciences is the liberal arts college at the University of Arkansas. It is named for former University President and United States Senator J. William Fulbright. The college has 19 different academic departments, and is the largest school or college at the university. Fulbright College's Creative Writing and Translation programs rank among the top in the nation.

== Departments ==
Academic rankings

National
- Forbes: 283
- U.S. News & World Report: 135 (tie)
- Washington Monthly: 208
- WSJ/College Pulse: 444

Global
- QS: 801 (tie)
- THE: 501 (tie)
- U.S. News & World Report: 650 (tie)

- Department of Anthropology
- Department of Biological Sciences
- Department of Chemistry and Biochemistry
- Department of Communication
- Department of English
- Department of Geosciences
- Department of History
  - The Ozark Historical Review

Published in the Spring semester

- Department of Mathematical Sciences
- Department of Music
- Department of Philosophy
- Department of Physics
- Department of Political Science
- Department of Psychological Science
- Department of Sociology and Criminology
- Department of Theatre
- Department of World Languages, Literatures, and Cultures
- School of Art
- School of Journalism and Strategic Media
- School of Social Work

== School of Journalism and Strategic Media ==
The School of Journalism and Strategic Media at the University of Arkansas is a subdivision of the J. William Fulbright College of Arts and Sciences that teaches and researches news, broadcasting, advertising, public relations, and related media subjects. The school is located in Kimpel Hall just north of the Walton College of Business.

=== History ===
The school was founded by Walter J. Lemke in 1928 and named in his honor posthumously in 1988.

=== Programs ===
The undergraduate program has three concentrations: Editorial/News Concentration, Broadcast Radio & TV Concentration, and Advertising & Public Relations.

The School also produces KUAF/National Public Radio, UATV, the university's student-run television network, "The Arkansas Traveler," the university's student newspaper, KXUA student radio, "The Razorback," the university's yearbook, and "The Hill Magazine," an annual in-depth publication.

== School of Social Work ==
The baccalaureate Social Work (BSW) program has been offered since 1940, one of the oldest undergraduate social work programs in the United States. The Master Social Work program is also available for graduate Social Work students.

=== Social Work Research Center ===
The Social Work Research Center was established in 2001, and studies poverty in Arkansas. Results are published and brought to the attention of federal and state politicians.

== Facilities ==
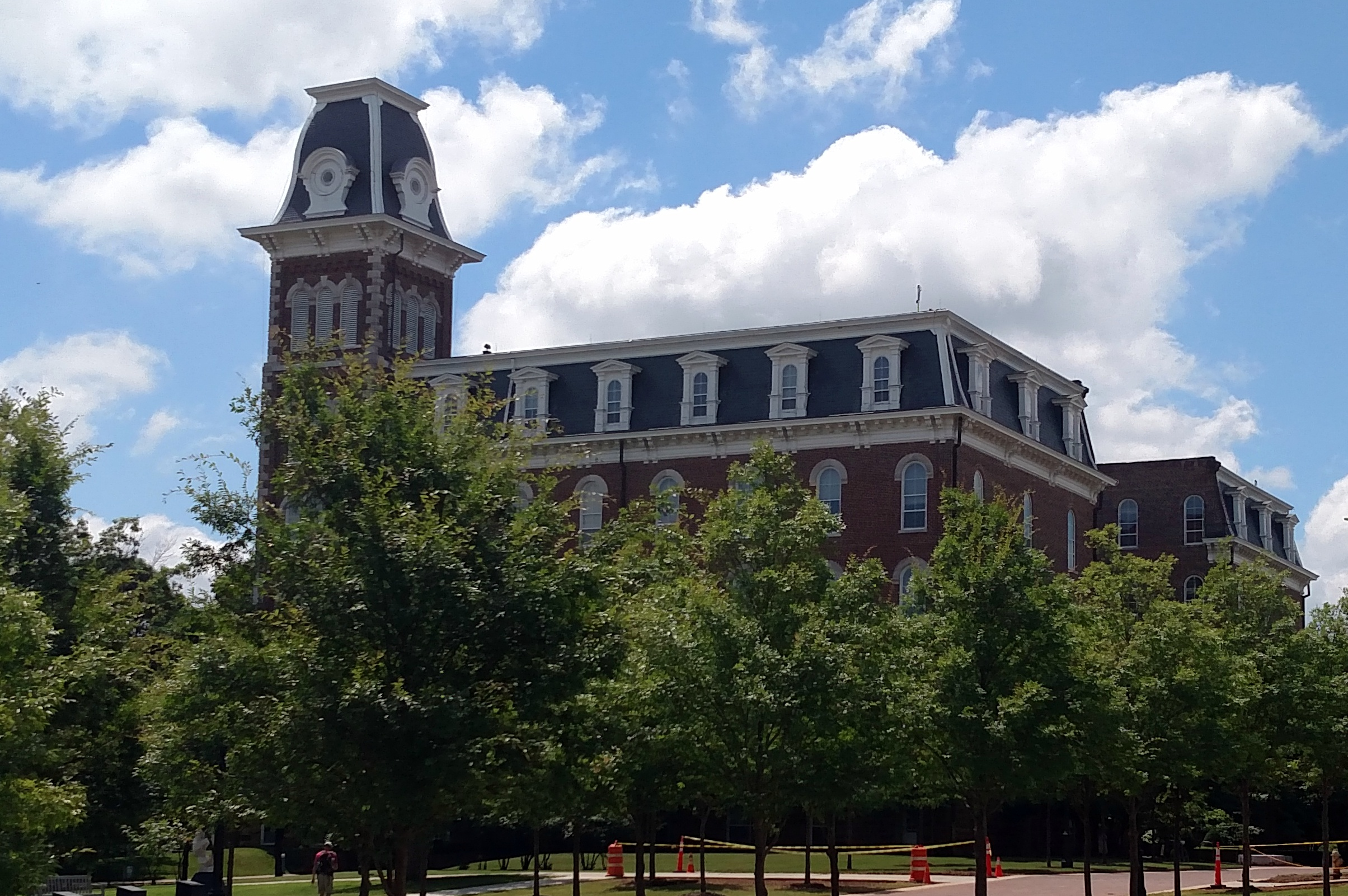
Old Main, home to office of the dean of the college and administrative staff

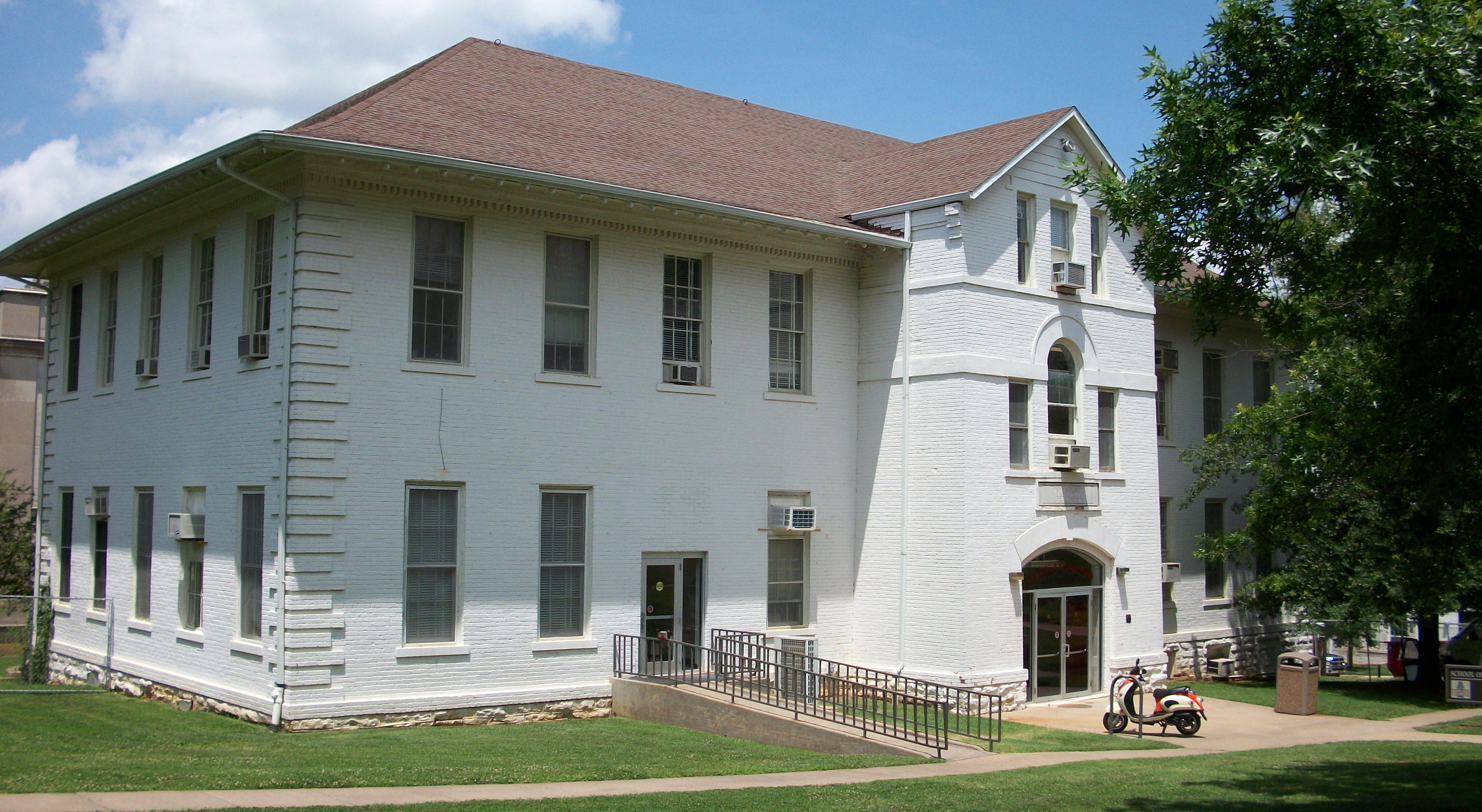
Academic Support Building

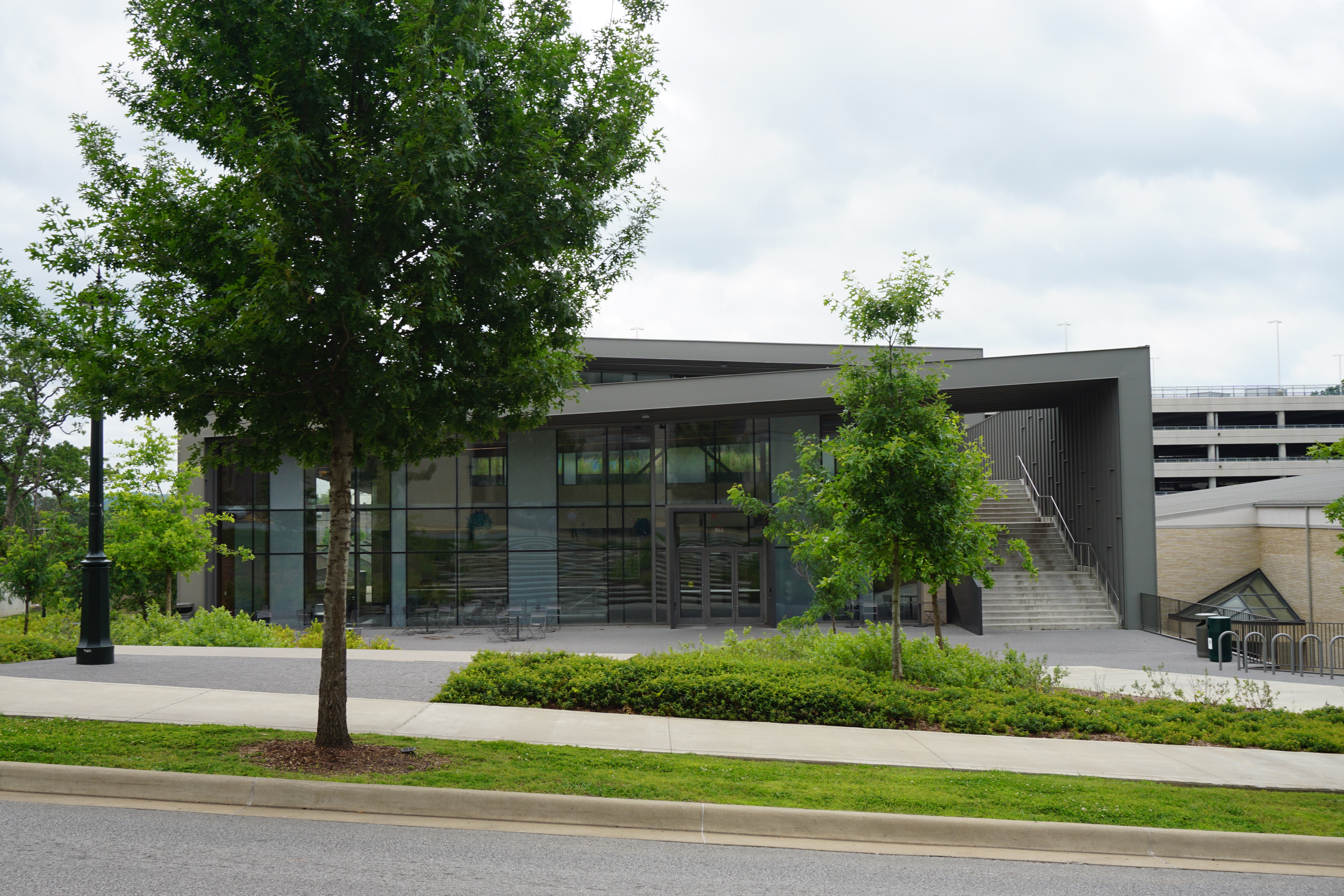
Champions Hall (2015–present)

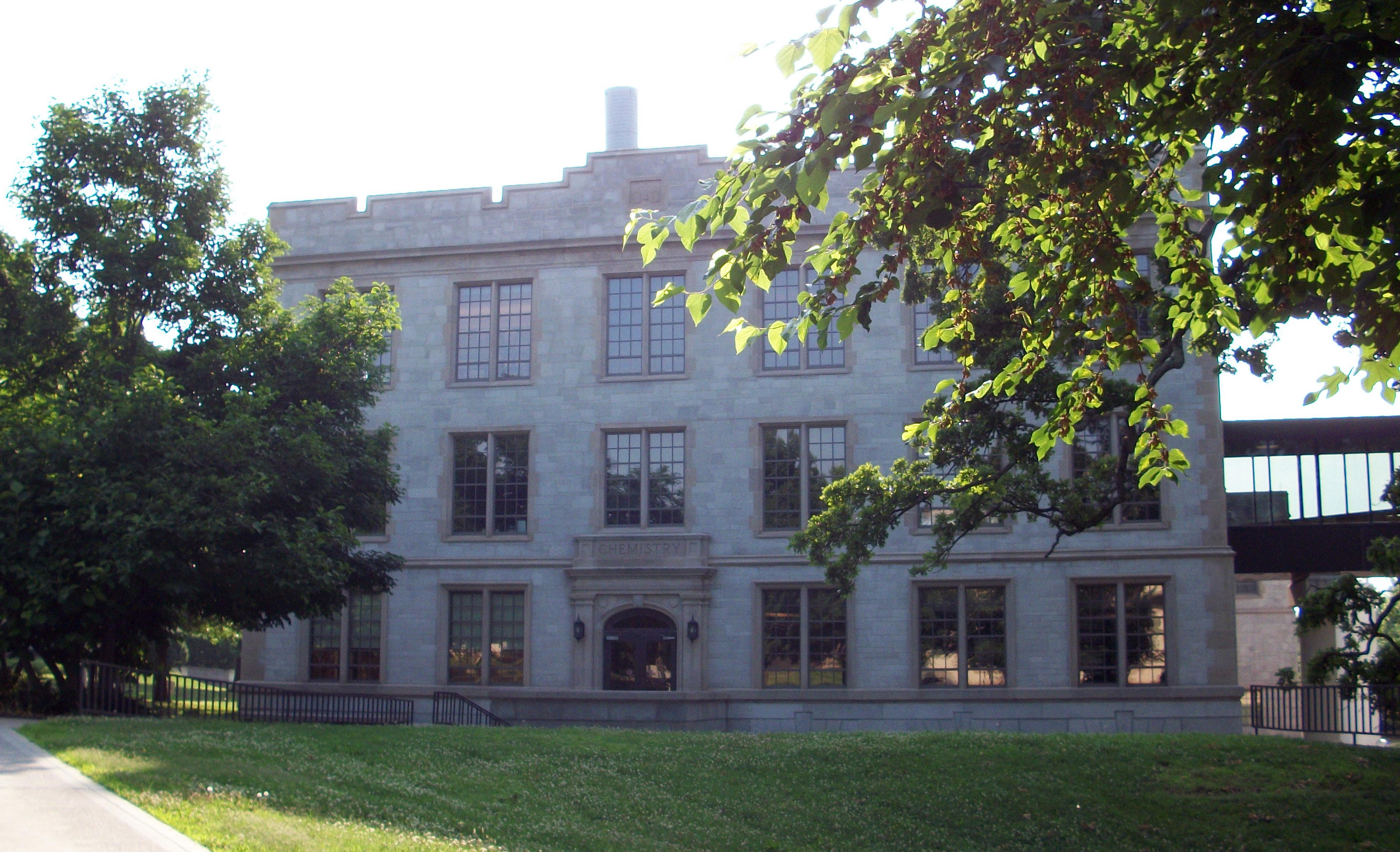
Chemistry Building (1935–present)

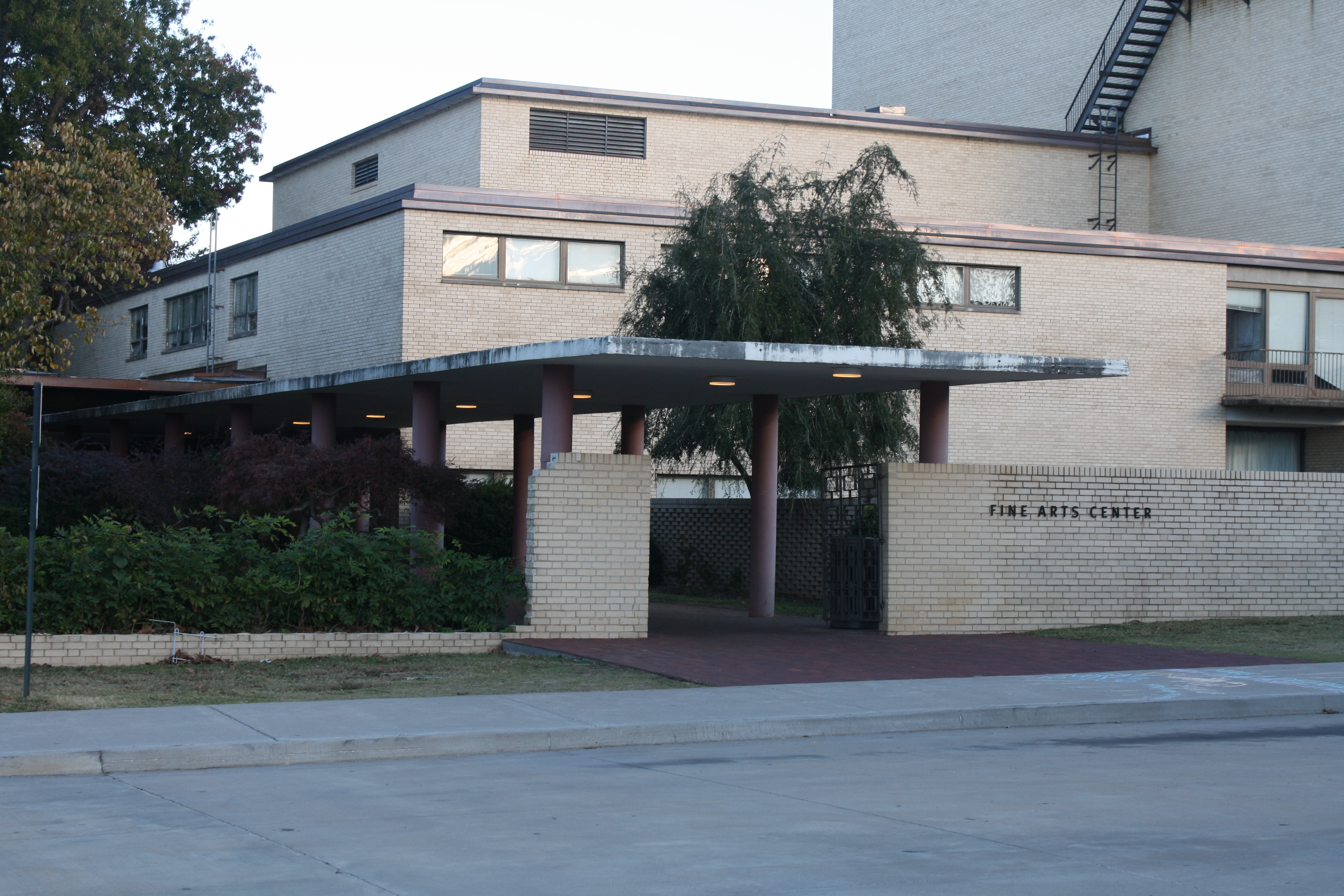
Fine Arts Center (1951–present)

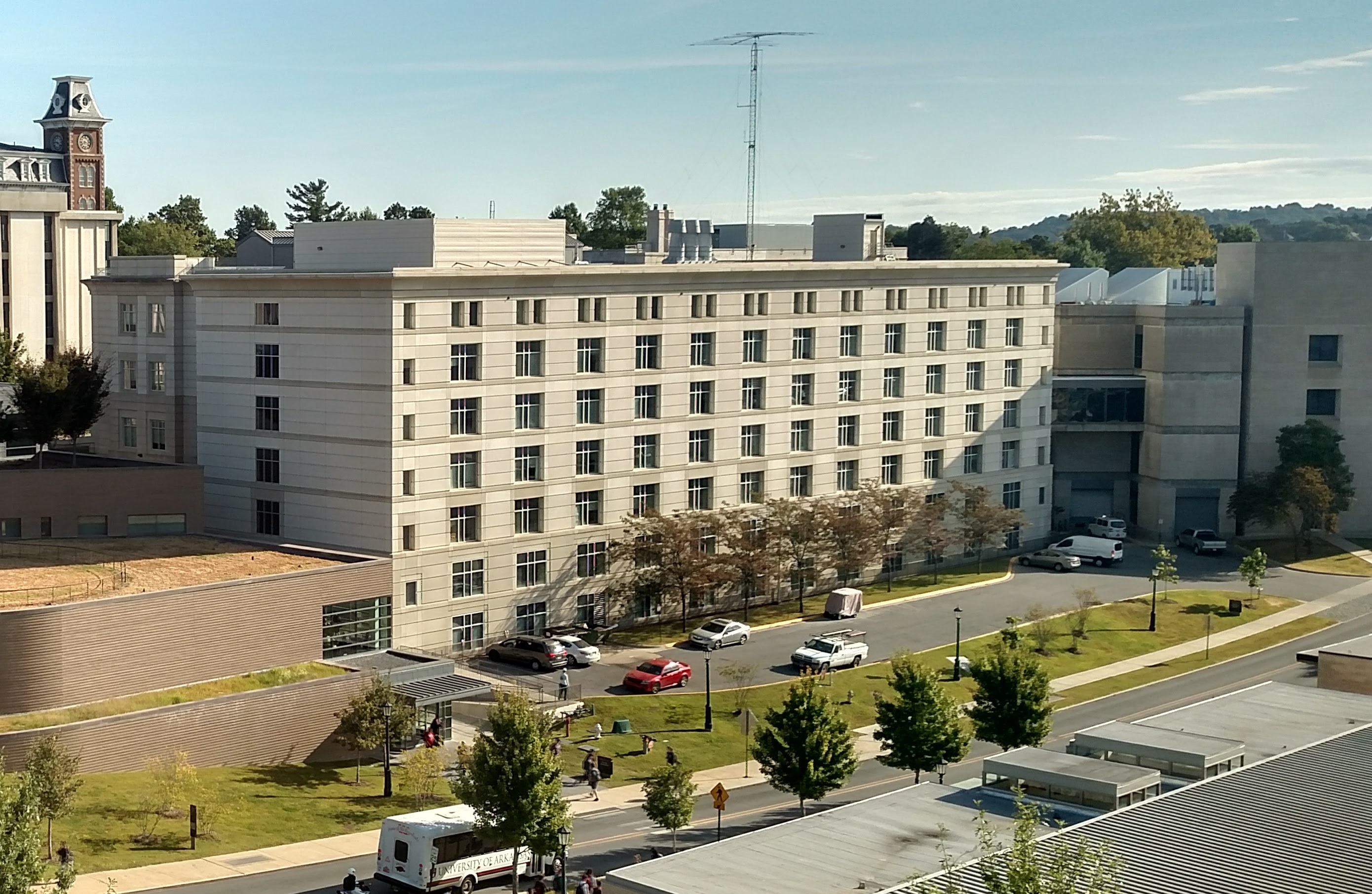
Science Engineering Hall (1964–present)

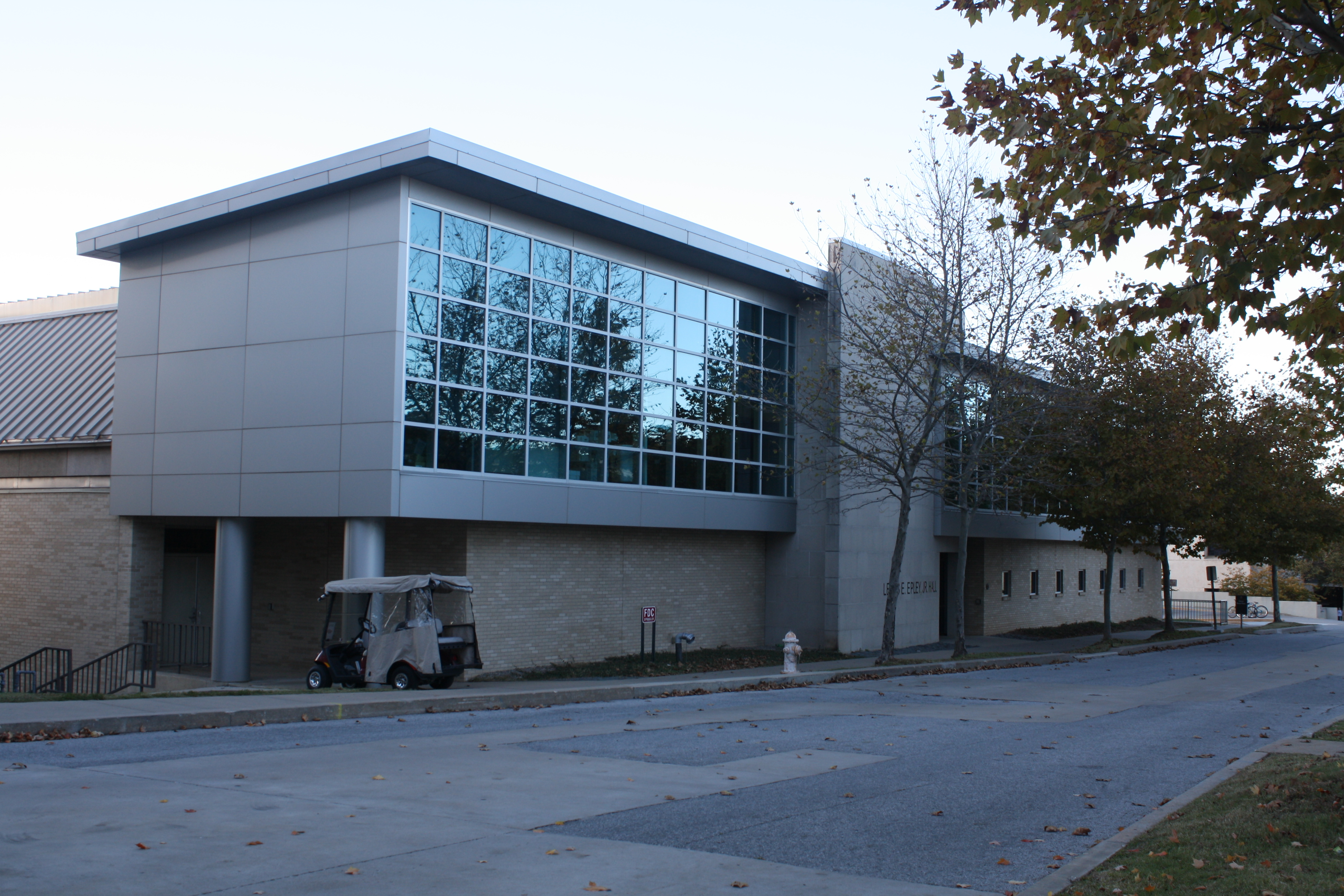
Lewis E. Epley Jr. Band Hall (1964–present)

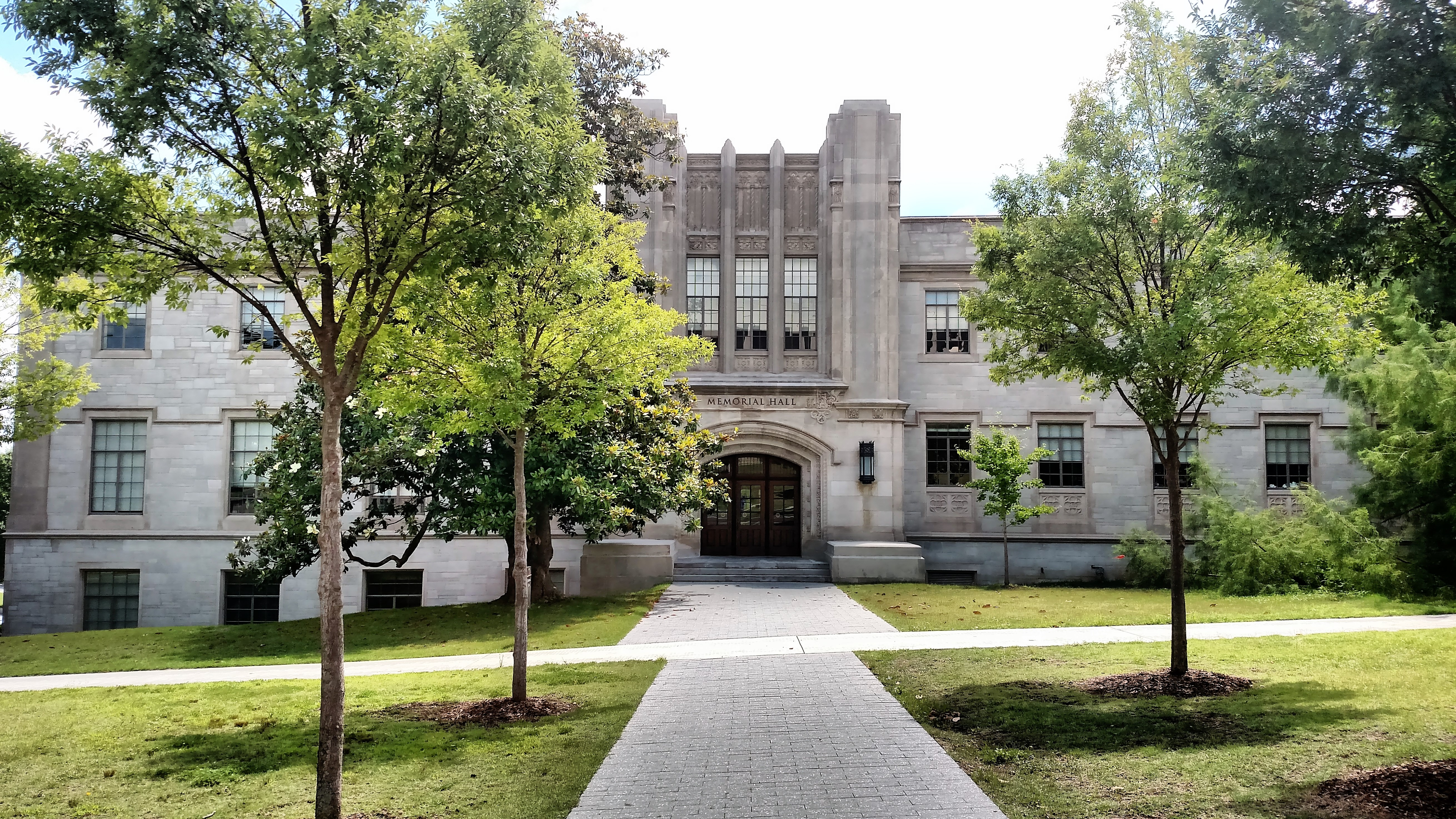
Memorial Hall (1973–present)

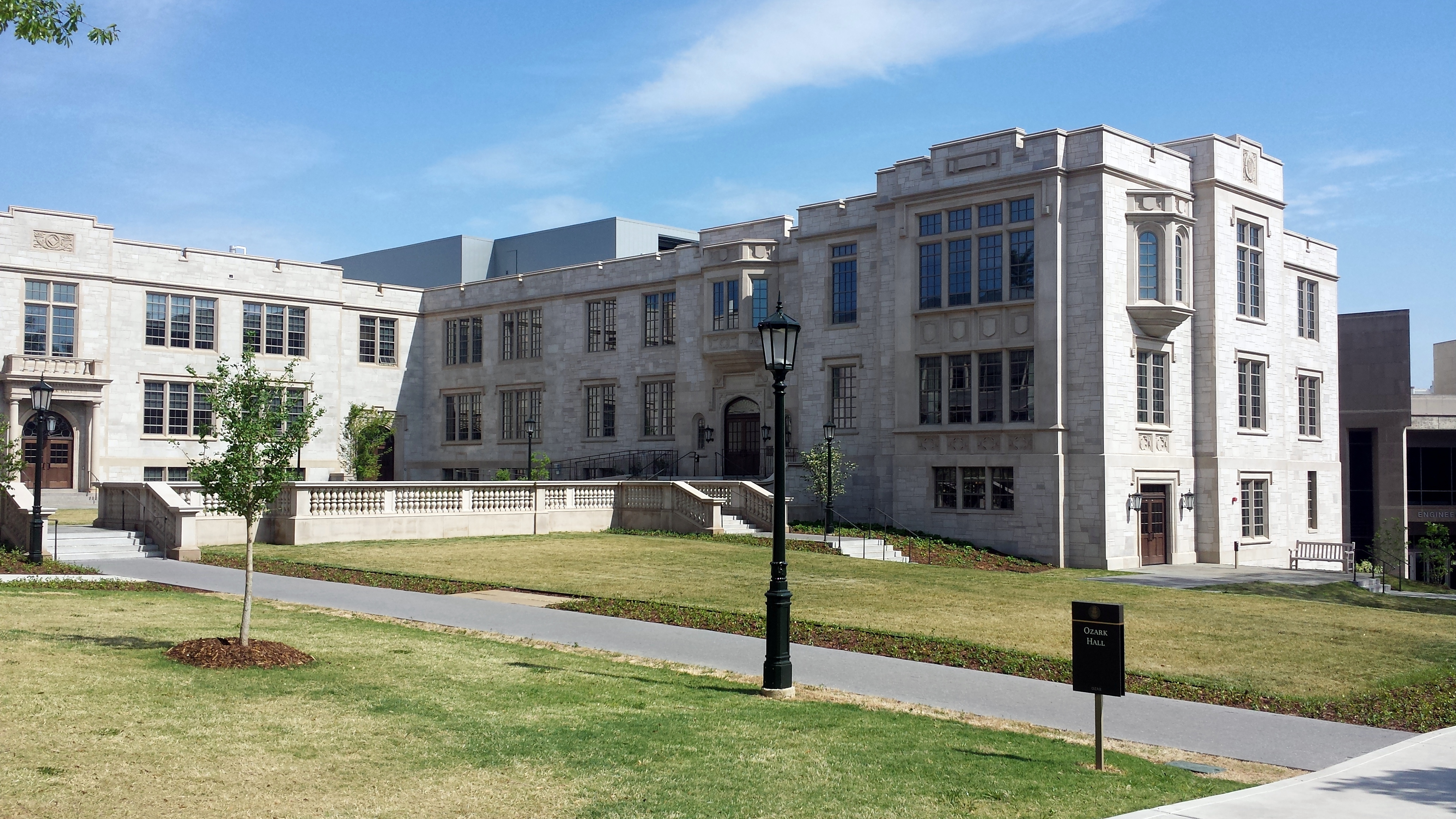
Gearhart Hall (1987–Present)

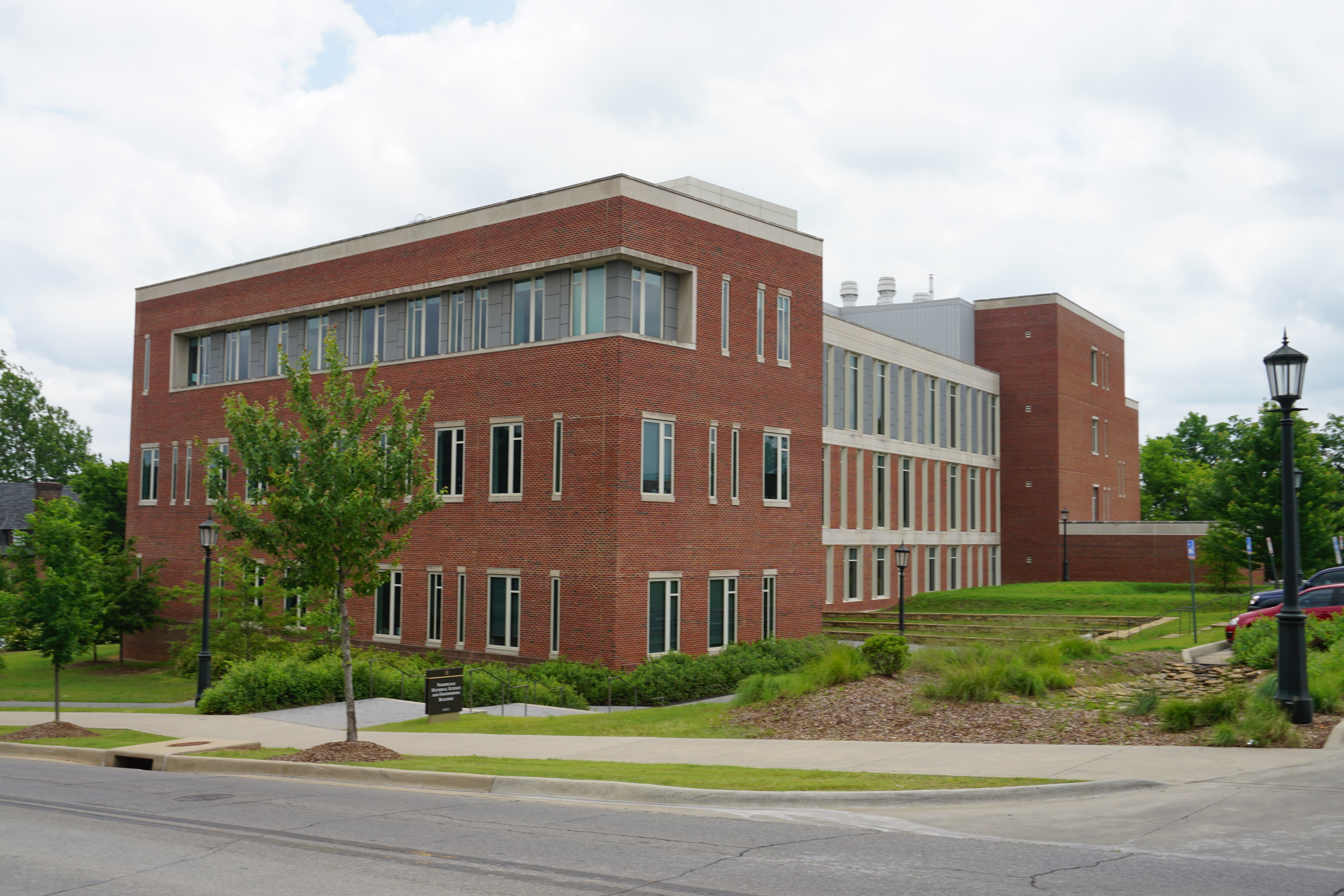
Microelectronics and Photonics (2011–present)

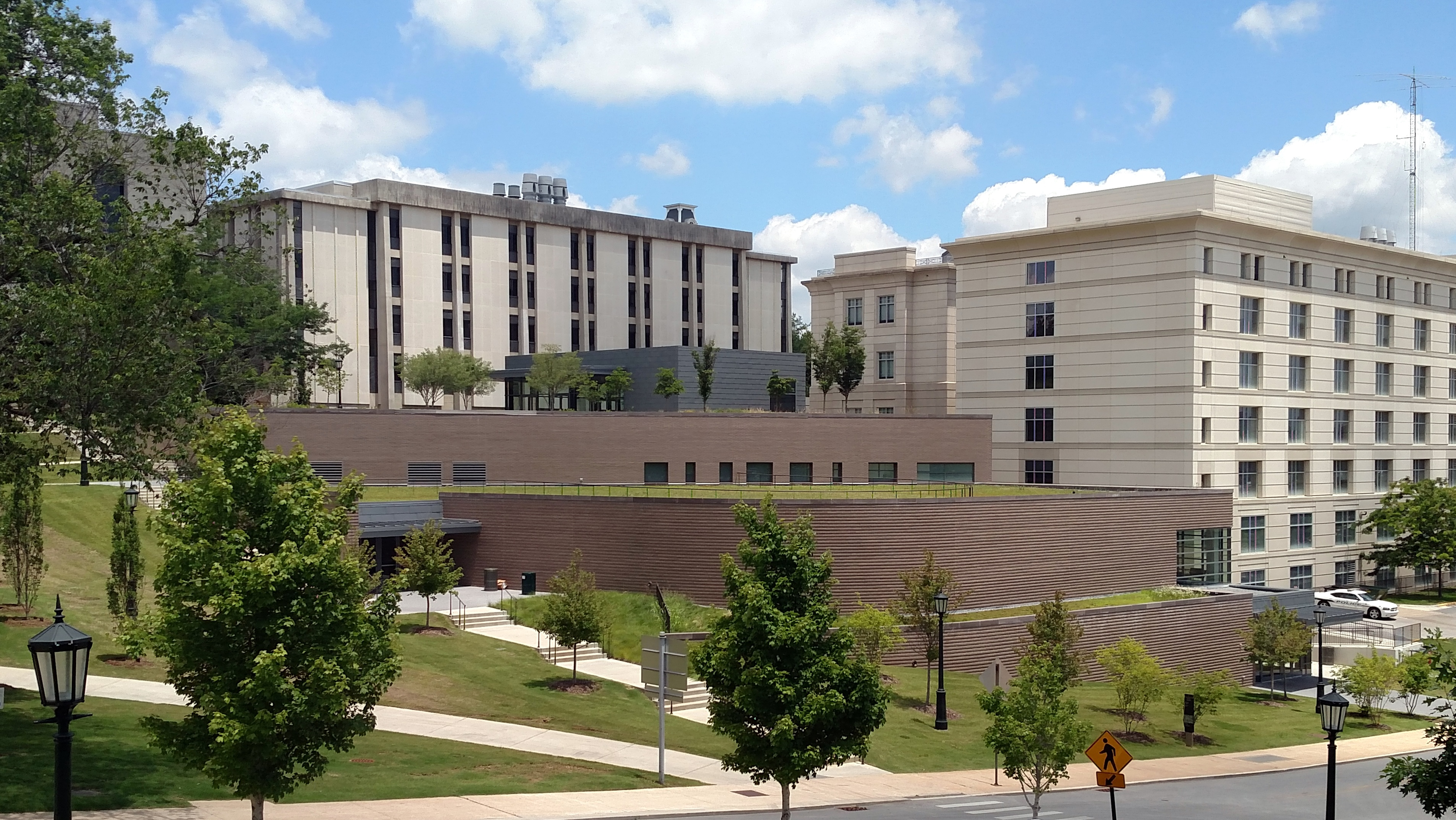
Hillside Auditorium (2012–present)

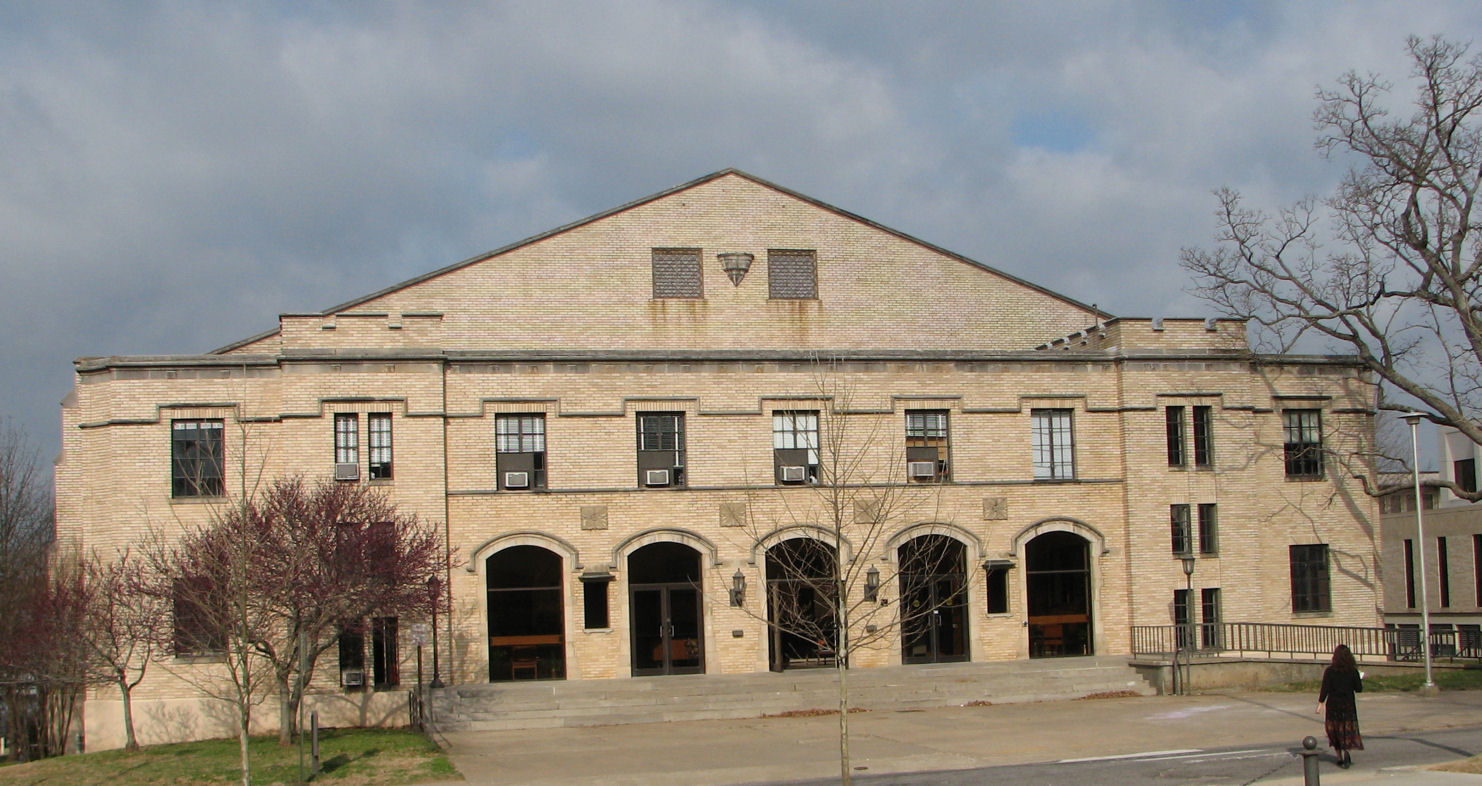
Jim & Joyce Faulkner Performing Arts Center (2015–present)

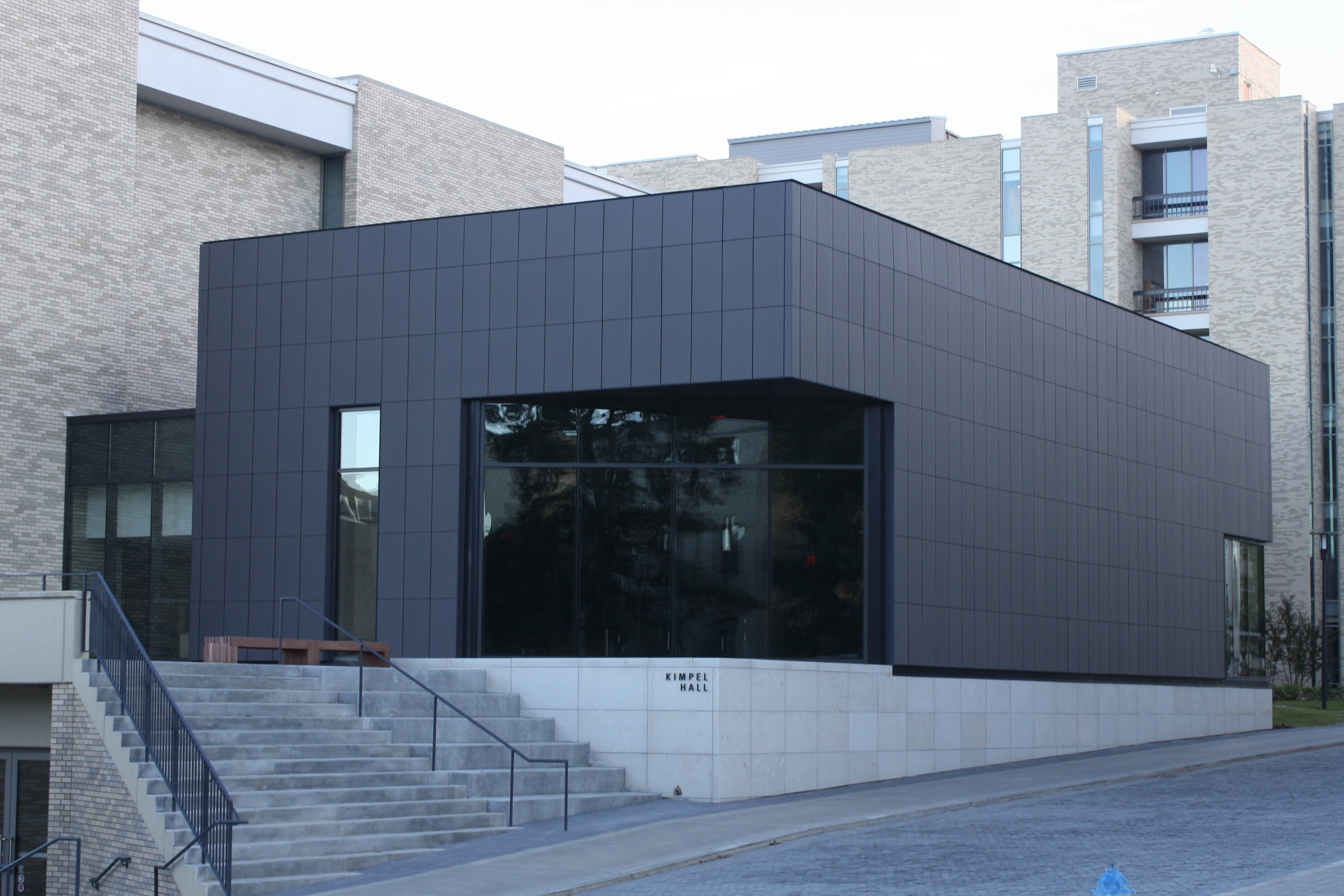
Sue Walk Burnett Journalism and Student Media Center (2018–present)
