= Joseph E. Steinmetz =

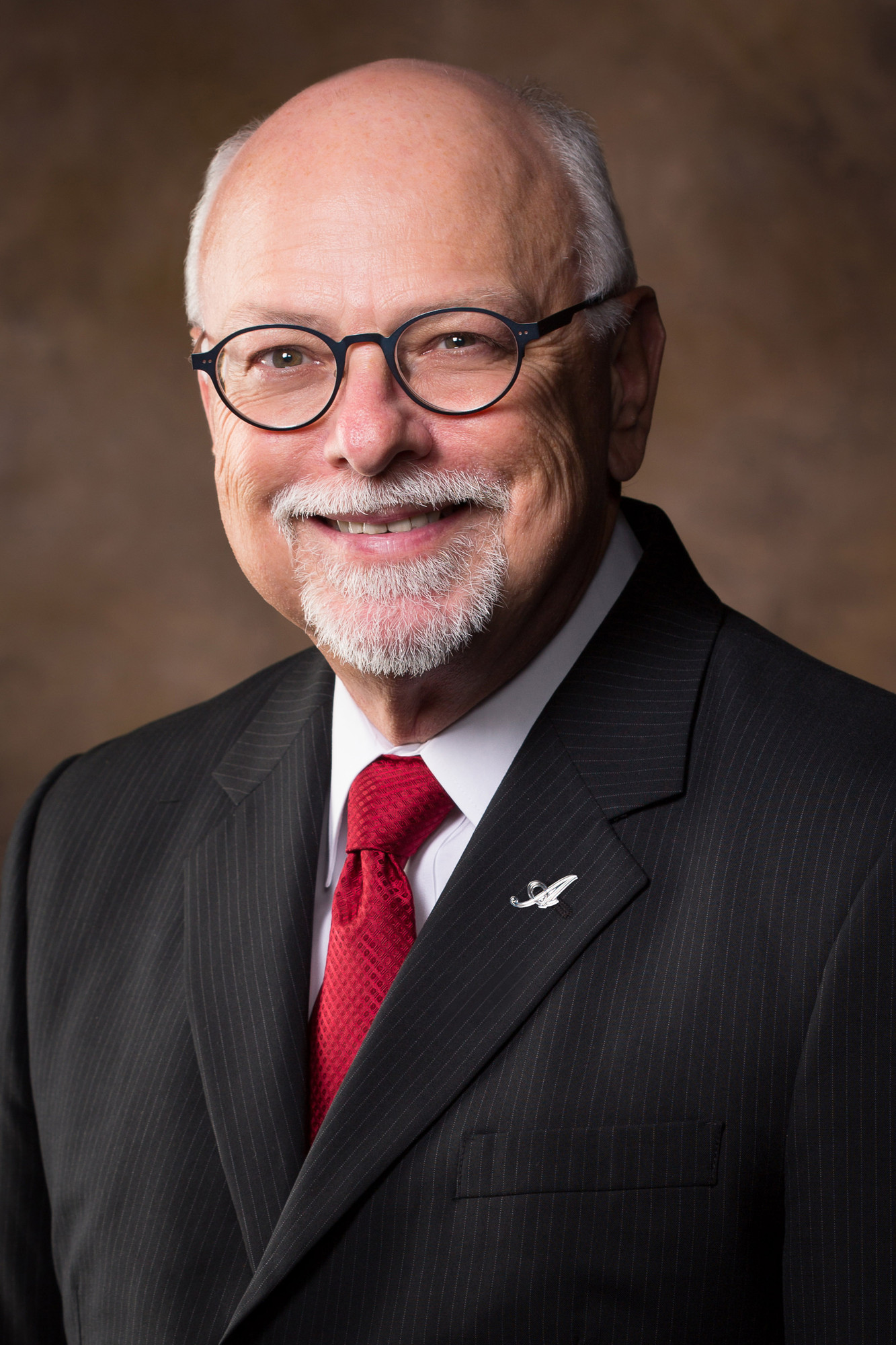

6th Chancellor of the University of Arkansas
- In office 2016–2021
- Preceded by: G. David Gearhart
- Succeeded by: Charles F. Robinson

Personal details
- Born: January 6, 1955 (age 71) Marine City, Michigan, U.S.
- Spouse: Sandra S. Steinmetz
- Education: Central Michigan University; Ohio University

Joseph E. Steinmetz (born January 6, 1955) was the sixth chancellor of the University of Arkansas. He succeeded G. David Gearhart on Jan. 1, 2016, following academic and administrative positions at Stanford University, Indiana University Bloomington, University of Kansas, and Ohio State University.

== Career in higher education ==
=== Early career ===
Steinmetz earned degrees at Central Michigan University and Ohio University during the 1970s and 1980s and then worked as a post-doctoral research fellow at Stanford. He accepted a faculty position at Indiana University Bloomington in 1987, where he taught in the Department of Psychology, the Neural Science program, and the Cognitive Science program. While there, he was a Distinguished Professor of Psychological and Brain Sciences. In 2006, he was appointed dean of the College of Liberal Arts and Sciences at the University of Kansas with a distinguished faculty appointment as a molecular bioscience and psychology professor.

Steinmetz became Ohio State's vice provost for arts and sciences and executive dean of the then-new College of Arts and Sciences in 2009. His responsibilities included combining five independent colleges of arts and sciences into a consolidated college, the country's largest arts and sciences college. He also helped enhance the arts district on the Ohio State campus, a project started while he was vice provost and continued after he was promoted to provost of Ohio State in 2013. He also worked to build strong ties between the university and the Columbus arts community.

He has served as editor-in-chief of Behavioral and Cognitive Neuroscience Reviews and Integrative Physiological and Behavioral Science. He has co-authored peer-reviewed articles and books on neuroscience and its relation to behavior.

=== Career at University of Arkansas ===
The University of Arkansas Board of Trustees named Steinmetz as the sixth chancellor of the University of Arkansas on Jan. 1, 2016. He is the first chancellor in three decades who only had connections to the University of Arkansas after his appointment. As a result, his early efforts have been to learn about the university and the state of Arkansas, hold meetings with all academic departments, and schedule a bus tour to meet with Arkansans. He resigned on June 18, 2021, citing the challenge of leading a university in a polarized society.

== Personal ==
Steinmetz is married to Sandra S. Steinmetz, and they have two children, Jacob Steinmetz and Adam Steinmetz, and five grandchildren.

== Education ==
- Doctor of Philosophy, 1983, Ohio University
- Master of Arts in experimental psychology, 1979, Central Michigan University
- Bachelor of Science in psychology, 1977, Central Michigan University
