= John C. Floyd =

American politician (1858–1930)

John Charles Floyd
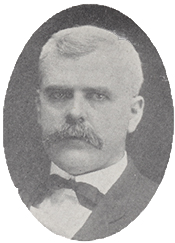

Member of the U.S. House of Representatives from Arkansas's 3rd district
- In office March 4, 1905 – March 3, 1915
- Preceded by: Hugh A. Dinsmore
- Succeeded by: John N. Tillman

Member of the Arkansas House of Representatives
- In office 1889–1891

Personal details
- Born: April 14, 1858 Sparta, Tennessee, U.S.
- Died: November 4, 1930 (aged 72) Yellville, Arkansas, U.S.
- Citizenship: United States
- Party: Democratic
- Spouse: Virginia Berry Floyd
- Children: Nina B. Floyd Rector H. Floyd James Berry Floyd
- Education: Arkansas Industrial University(later the University of Arkansas)
- Profession: Attorney

John Charles Floyd (April 14, 1858 – November 4, 1930) was an American politician and a U.S. Representative from Arkansas.

== Biography ==
Born in Sparta, Tennessee, Floyd was the son of John Wesley and Eliza Jane Snodgrass Floyd. He moved to Benton County, Arkansas, in 1869 with his parents, who settled near Bentonville. He attended the common and high schools, and was graduated from the Arkansas Industrial University (later the University of Arkansas) at Fayetteville in 1879. In November 1887, he married Virginia Berry, and they had three children, Nina B., Rector H., and James Berry.

== Career ==
Floyd taught school at Springdale, Arkansas, in 1880 and 1881, and studied law. He was admitted to the bar in 1882 and commenced practice in Yellville, Arkansas. He served in the Arkansas House of Representatives from 1889 to 1891, and was prosecuting attorney of the fourteenth judicial circuit from 1890 to 1894.

Elected as a Democrat to the Fifty-ninth and to the four succeeding Congresses, Floyd served from March 4, 1905 to March 3, 1915. He was one of the managers appointed by the House of Representatives in 1912 to conduct the impeachment proceedings against Robert W. Archbald, judge of the United States Commerce Court. Not a candidate for renomination in 1914, he resumed the practice of law in Yellville, Arkansas. He was an unsuccessful candidate for nomination as Governor of Arkansas in 1920.

== Death ==
Floyd died in Yellville, Arkansas, on November 4, 1930 (age 72 years, 204 days). He is interred at Layton Cemetery, Yellville, Arkansas.

U.S. House of Representatives
Preceded by Hugh A. Dinsmore	Member of the U.S. House of Representatives from Arkansas's 3rd congressional district 1905–1915	Succeeded by John N. Tillman
