= Mounir Farah =

Mounir A. Farah was a professor Emeritus of education and Middle East Studies at the University of Arkansas-Fayetteville. Before that, he taught history and social science at New York University and Western Connecticut State University, as well as being a lecturer at international teacher's conferences. He served as a consultant for the Ministry of Education in Jordan and as a board member and past president of the Middle East Outreach Council. He has written several history texts for Glencoe and the National Geographic Society, among them Global Insights and World History, The Human Experience. Farah died on 8 November 2024.
