= G. David Gearhart =

American author (born 1952)

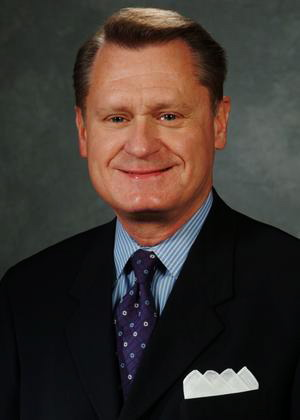

5th Chancellor of the University of Arkansas
- In office 2008–2015
- Preceded by: John A. White
- Succeeded by: Joseph E. Steinmetz

Personal details
- Born: June 9, 1952 (age 74) Fayetteville, Arkansas, U.S.
- Spouse: Jane Gearhart
- Education: University of Arkansas; Westminster College (Missouri)
- Website: Chancellor's Office

G. David Gearhart (born June 9, 1952) was the fifth chancellor of the University of Arkansas. He succeeded John A. White on July 1, 2008, following 10 years of service to the university in his capacity as vice chancellor for university advancement. As chancellor, Gearhart instituted the first tuition freeze in 24 years and implemented a $220 million campus building renovation and refurbishment plan, as well as a campus-wide energy savings plan. He has also undertaken a renewed emphasis on the arts on campus, including the establishment of the “All Steinway Campus.” Under his leadership campus enrollment increased by more than 10 percent in two years, record research awards were recorded, and the university was reclassified by the Carnegie Foundation for the Advancement of Teaching as RU/VH—“research university/very high,” the foundation’s top research classification.

== Career in higher education ==
=== Early career ===
In 1977, Gearhart was appointed the director of development at Westminster College and led fundraising efforts for the Winston Churchill Memorial and Library. He returned to his native state in 1978 to become vice president for development at Hendrix College. After four years at Hendrix, Gearhart was selected to be the director of development at the University of Arkansas. In 1985, Gearhart was appointed vice president for development and university relations at Pennsylvania State University, becoming senior vice president three years later.

While at Penn State, he launched a major capital campaign, which raised in excess of $352 million. Total private gifts to Penn State during his 11 years at the university surpassed $950 million. In 1995, Gearhart joined the international consulting firm of Grenzebach, Glier, and Associates as senior vice president and managing director.

=== Career at the University of Arkansas ===
Gearhart returned to Arkansas in 1998 as vice chancellor for university advancement at the University of Arkansas. In that capacity, he was the architect of the Campaign for the Twenty-First Century, a billion-dollar capital campaign that concluded in June 2005 with the University of Arkansas taking its place as one of only 13 public universities at that time to have exceeded a billion dollars raised.

The centerpiece of this campaign was a $300 million gift from the Walton Family Charitable Support Foundation, the largest gift ever made to a public university. The direct results of Gearhart’s leadership in this effort included the creation of 132 new endowed faculty positions, 1,738 new student scholarship and fellowship funds, dozens of new and renovated facilities and classrooms, and growth of the overall endowment from $119 million in 1998 to nearly $900 million by the time he assumed the chancellorship.

In 2013, Gearhart became involved in a scandal with then Vice Chancellor for University Advancement Brad Choate over budget shortfalls in the fundraising division of the institution. Choate, whose contract was not renewed, oversaw the overspending of the division's budget. In response to a Freedom of Information Act request submitted by the Arkansas Democrat Gazette regarding the budget shortfalls, the university determined that the requested record was exempt because it was an employee evaluation and job performance record involving Choate and another university employee. After receiving permission from both employees to release the record, the university provided it to the newspaper.

To satisfy public concerns about the division’s budget shortfalls, Gearhart requested an audit of Advancement finances by the Arkansas Division of Legislative Audit and the University of Arkansas System. The audit report was jointly published on September 11, 2013. At the subsequent meeting of the Legislature's auditing committee, a former university employee made allegations that Gearhart had fostered a "culture of secrecy" and directed the destruction of relevant documents. A prosecutor then investigated allegations that the University had violated the Freedom of Information Act (which would be a criminal offense under Arkansas law), but the prosecutor found no evidence of criminal activity. The prosecutor’s review included conflicting testimony from several witnesses, some indicating that Gearhart had told them to "get rid of" a document. However, the prosecutor determined that the document in question was not responsive to any FOIA request and thus had no bearing on the matter at hand.

== Leadership ==
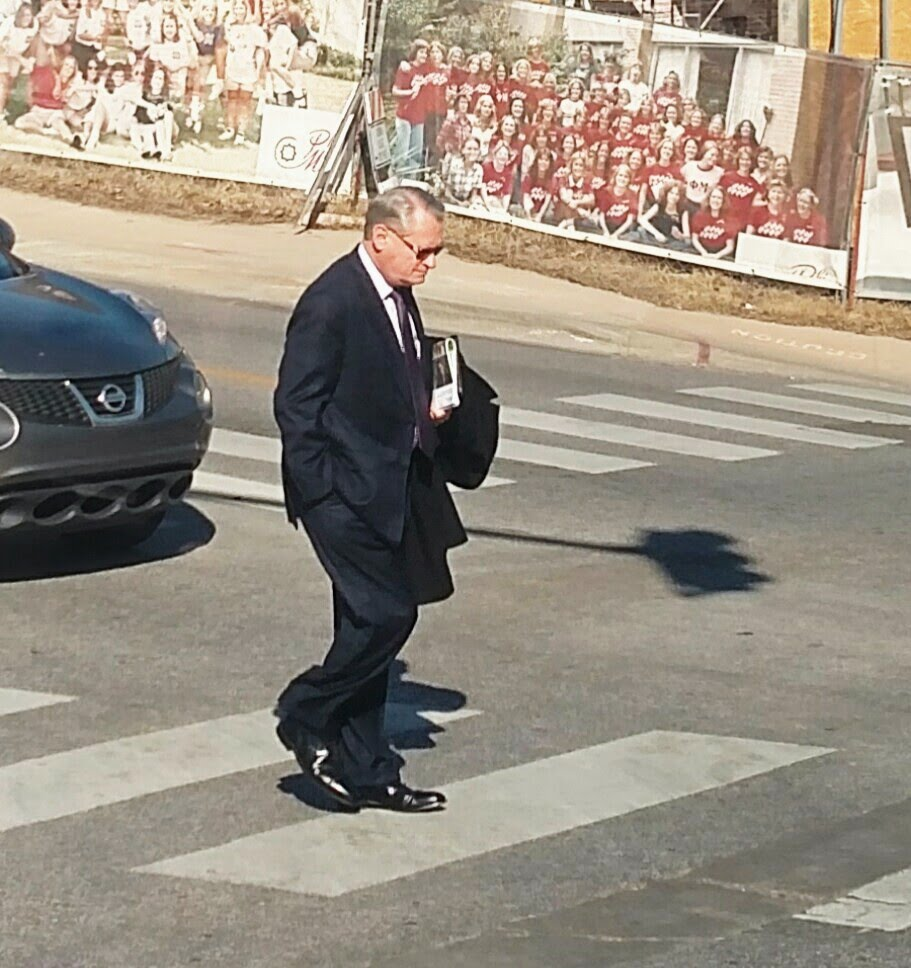
Chancellor Emeritus Gearhart crosses Maple Street on campus in Fayetteville

In addition to his responsibilities as chancellor, Gearhart is a tenured member of the faculty in the College of Education and Health Professions, holding the rank of professor. A nationally respected expert in capital campaigns, he is the author of two books, The Capital Campaign in Higher Education and Philanthropy, Fund Raising and the Capital Campaign, as well as numerous articles.

Gearhart is also an advocate for the DREAM Act, which provides a path to citizenship for alien minors.

In 2014, following a decision from Pulaski County Circuit Court Judge Chris Piazza, the University of Arkansas began offering spousal benefits to same-sex married couples. Following the Supreme Court's stay of Piazza's decision, however, all campuses in the University of Arkansas System, including the University of Arkansas, could no longer offer these benefits.

Among his current professional affiliations, Gearhart serves as vice president of the University of Arkansas Fayetteville Campus Foundation, is a member of the board of advisors for the Arkansas World Trade Center, is a member of the Northwest Arkansas Council, and is a member of the advisory board of the Pryor Center for Oral and Visual History. He also is a licensed attorney in the state of Arkansas.

== Personal ==
A native of Fayetteville, Arkansas, Gearhart is married to the former Jane Brockmann, whom he married in 1974. They have two children. Gearhart’s late father, George A. Gearhart, was publisher of the Northwest Arkansas Times in Fayetteville. His mother, Joan Gearhart Havens, lives in Fayetteville.

== Education ==
- Fulbright Fellowship 1992, Oxford University, Merton College, Oxford, England
- Doctor of Education (Ed.D.) 1989, University of Arkansas, Fayetteville, AR.
- Juris Doctor, (J.D.) 1977, University of Arkansas School of Law, Fayetteville, AR
- Bachelor of Arts (B.A.) 1974, Westminster College, Fulton, MO.
