= John N. Tillman =

American politician

John Tillman
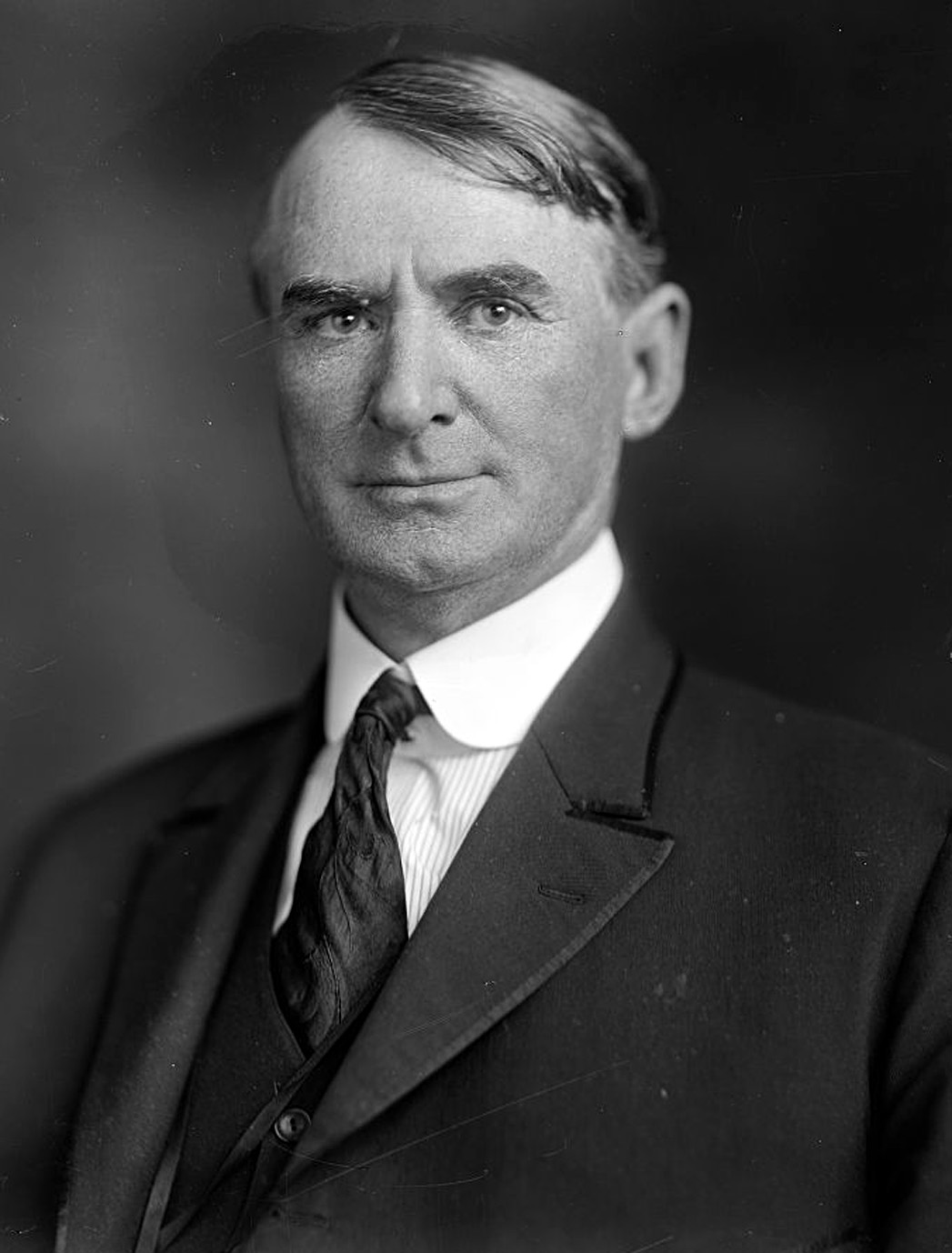

9th President of University of Arkansas
- In office 1905–1912
- Preceded by: John H. Reynolds
- Succeeded by: John L. Buchanan

Member of the U.S. House of Representatives from Arkansas's 3rd district
- In office March 4, 1915 – March 3, 1929
- Preceded by: John C. Floyd
- Succeeded by: Claude A. Fuller

Member of the Arkansas Senate
- In office 1888–1892

Personal details
- Born: December 13, 1859 Springfield, Missouri, U.S.
- Died: March 9, 1929 (aged 69) Fayetteville, Arkansas, U.S
- Party: Democratic
- Education: University of Arkansas

John Newton Tillman (December 13, 1859 – March 9, 1929) was a U.S. representative from Arkansas. In the Arkansas State Senate he proposed the Separate Coach Law of 1891, a Jim Crow law to segregate African American passengers. The bill became law.

Born near Springfield, Missouri, Tillman attended the common schools, and graduated from the University of Arkansas at Fayetteville in 1880. He taught school while studying law, and was admitted to the bar in 1883, commencing practice in Fayetteville, Arkansas. He served as clerk of the circuit court of Washington County from 1884 to 1889, and served in the Arkansas State Senate from 1888 to 1892.

From 1892 to 1898, he served as prosecuting attorney of the fourth judicial circuit, and served as judge of the same circuit court from 1900 to 1905. He served as president of the University of Arkansas from 1905 to 1912.

Tillman was elected as a Democrat to the Sixty-fourth and to the six succeeding Congresses (March 4, 1915 – March 3, 1929). He was one of the managers appointed by the House of Representatives in 1926 to conduct the impeachment proceedings against George W. English, judge of the United States District Court for the Eastern District of Illinois.

Tillman did not seek renomination in 1928. He died in Fayetteville, Arkansas on March 9, 1929, and was interred in Evergreen Cemetery.

U.S. House of Representatives
Preceded by John C. Floyd	Member of the U.S. House of Representatives from Arkansas's 3rd congressional district March 4, 1915 – March 3, 1929	Succeeded by Claude A. Fuller
