= Jesse C. Deen =

American politician

Member of the Louisiana House of Representatives
- In office 1972–1988

Personal details
- Born: Jesse Claude Deen; April 24, 1922 Eros, Louisiana, U.S.
- Died: December 7, 2015 (aged 93)
- Party: Democratic
- Education: University of Louisiana at Lafayette; University of Arkansas

Jesse Claude Deen (April 24, 1922 – December 7, 2015) was an American politician. A member of the Democratic Party, he served in the Louisiana House of Representatives from 1972 to 1988.

== Life and career ==
Deen was born in Eros, Louisiana, the son of Marion Claude Deen and Minnie Durham. He attended Montgomery High School, graduating in 1940. After graduating, he attended the University of Louisiana at Lafayette, earning his BS degree in 1943, which after earning his degree, he served in the United States Navy during World War II. After his discharge, he worked as an agriculture teacher at Rocky Mount High School, and earned his master's degree from the University of Arkansas.

Deen served in the Louisiana House of Representatives from 1972 to 1988.

== Death ==
Deen died on December 7, 2015, at the age of 93.
