= Walter Keller (researcher) =

John Walter Keller Jr. is a mathematician, physicist, researcher, designer, and inventor. He designed and holds the patent on the first implantable atrial synchronous heart pacemaker; he designed a demand circuit critical to the controls of the artificial heart; and he pioneered the first remotely programmable computer implantable prosthesis.
