= Clyde T. Ellis =

American politician (1908–1980)

Member of the U.S. House of Representatives from Arkansas's 3rd district
- In office January 3, 1939 – January 3, 1943
- Preceded by: Claude A. Fuller
- Succeeded by: J. William Fulbright

Member of the Arkansas Senate
- In office 1935–1939

Member of the Arkansas House of Representatives
- In office 1933–1935

Personal details
- Born: Clyde Taylor Ellis; December 21, 1908 near Garfield, Arkansas, U.S.
- Died: February 9, 1980 (aged 71) Washington, D.C., U.S.
- Resting place: Arlington National Cemetery
- Party: Democratic
- Spouse: Izella Baker (m. 1931)
- Education: University of Arkansas at Fayetteville (BS); American University; George Washington University
- Occupation: Politician; lawyer

Military service
- Allegiance: United States
- Branch/service: United States Navy
- Years of service: 1943–1945
- Rank: Lieutenant
- Battles/wars: World War II

Clyde Taylor Ellis (December 21, 1908 – February 9, 1980) was an American educator, lawyer and politician. A member of the Democratic Party he served two terms as a U.S. representative from Arkansas from 1939 to 1943.

== Early life ==
Born on a farm near Garfield, Arkansas, Ellis was the son of Cecil Oscar and Minerva Jane Taylor Ellis. He attended the public schools of Fayetteville, Arkansas. He also attended the University of Arkansas at Fayetteville from which he received a B.S.; the school of law at the same university; as well as George Washington University Law School and American University in Washington, D.C.

== Career ==
Ellis was a teacher in the rural schools at Garfield, Arkansas in 1927 and 1928; then Superintendent of Schools at Garfield, Arkansas from 1929 to 1934. Admitted to the bar in 1933, he commenced practice at Bentonville, Arkansas. He served in the State House of Representatives from 1933 to 1935, and as member of the State Senate from 1935 to 1939. He was a delegate to the Democrat National Convention in 1940.

=== Congress ===
Elected as a Democrat to the Seventy-sixth Congress, Ellis was reelected to the Seventy-seventh Congress, and served from January 3, 1939 to January 3, 1943. He was not a candidate for reelection in 1942 but was an unsuccessful candidate for the Democratic nomination for United States Senator.

=== World War II ===
Ellis served as combat officer, Lieutenant, in the United States Navy from 1943 to 1945.

=== Later career ===
He was the first general manager (CEO) of the National Rural Electric Cooperative Association in Washington, D.C., from January 1943 until his retirement in September 1967. He was appointed as special consultant to the Secretary of Agriculture, January 1968 to January 1969, and served as special area development assistant to Senator John L. McClellan from February 1971 until 1977. He returned to the staff of the Secretary of Agriculture and was employed there until his retirement in August 1979. He resided in Chevy Chase, Maryland.

Ellis was known as "Mr. Rural Electrification" and wrote a book titled "A Giant Step," which was published in 1966. The work was dedicated "...to the people of the rural electrification program – past and present." It is semi-autobiographical and describes relevant contributions from many of the greatest proponents of rural electrification that Ellis came to work with in his career.

== Personal life ==
He married Izella Baker on December 20, 1931, and they had two daughters, Patricia Suzanne Ellis Marti and Mary Lynn Ellis Duty. He is also the grandfather of Diana West, a noted author and lecturer on breastfeeding issues.

== Death and burial ==
Ellis died from a stroke in Washington, D.C., on February 9, 1980. He is interred at Arlington National Cemetery, Arlington, Virginia.

U.S. House of Representatives
Preceded by Claude A. Fuller	Member of the U.S. House of Representatives from Arkansas's 3rd congressional district 1939–1943	Succeeded by J. William Fulbright
