= Walter J. Lemke =

Walter John Lemke (January 6, 1891 – December 4, 1968) was an American journalist and educator who established the department of journalism at the University of Arkansas.

== Early life ==
Lemke was born on January 6, 1891, in Wausau, Wisconsin, to Carl and Ulrika (Block) Lemke. He graduated from Baldwin-Wallace College in 1911 and took summer courses at the University of Wisconsin and the University of Indiana. On November 24, 1915, he married Marie Hamp. They had two children, Walter and Carol.

From 1913 to 1927, Lemke worked for several publications in the Midwestern United States, including the Warrenton Banner and The Collegiate World. He was also a professor of history, athletic director, and basketball coach at Central Wesleyan College. In 1928, he earned his MS in journalism from Northwestern University's Medill School of Journalism.

== Arkansas ==
In 1928, Lemke joined the University of Arkansas faculty as director of publicity, head of the UA news bureau, and the first head of its a journalism department. In 1929, he founded the Arkansas High School Press Association and was editor of its bulletin for 27 years During the 1930s, he illustrated a weekly cartoon about the history of Arkansas. From 1933 to 1938, he was a columnist for the Northwest Arkansas Times. During World War II, he published Uncle Walt’s Newsletter, which was compiled from he received from Arkansas alumni serving in the military. He helped found the Washington County Historical Society and was editor of the society's journal. He was also involved in the organization of the Prairie Grove Battlefield Commission and the Arkansas Genealogical Society.

Lemke retired from Arkansas in 1959. He died on December 4, 1968 and is buried at Evergreen Cemetery in Fayetteville, Arkansas. In 1988, the University of Arkansas named its journalism department after Lemke. In 2018, it was renamed the School of Journalism and Strategic Media.
