= John Hill =

John Hill may refer to:

== Business ==
- John A. Hill (1858–1916), American editor and publisher, co-founder of McGraw-Hill
- John Henry Hill (1791–1882), American businessman, educator and missionary
- John Hill (planter) (1824–1910), Scottish-born American industrialist and planter
- John Hill (Australian businessman) (1847–1926), Australian coach-horse operator
- John J. Hill (1853–1952), English-born American stonemason and builder
- John Sprunt Hill (1869–1961), American lawyer, banker and philanthropist
- John W. Hill (1890–1977), American public relations executive

== Entertainment ==
- Dean Koontz or John Hill (born 1945), American author
- John Hill (actor) (born 1978), American musical theater actor
- John Hill (cartoonist) (1889–1974), New Zealand cartoonist
- John Hill (conductor) (1843–?), Australian church organist and choirmaster
- John Hill (game designer) (1945–2015), American designer of Squad Leader and other wargames
- John Hill (musician) (active from 1993), American guitarist with the Apples in Stereo and Dressy Bessy
- John Hill (record producer) (active 2008 and after), American record producer, songwriter, and musician
- John Hill (screenwriter) (died 2017), American screenwriter and television producer
- John Stephen Hill (born 1953), Canadian actor
- John William Hill (1812–1879), British-born American artist
- John Hill (active 1968), English bassist in Band of Joy
- John Hill, British conspiracy theorist and creator of the 2007 documentary 7/7 Ripple Effect

== Military ==
- John Hill (British Army officer, died 1735), British Army general and courtier, brother of Abigail Masham, Baroness Masham
- John Hill (British Army colonel) (fl. 1777–1783), British Army officer during the American War of Independence
- John Hill (Royal Navy officer) (c. 1774–1855)
- John Hill (Indian Army officer) (1866–1935), British general
- John Hamar Hill or Johnnie Hill (1912–1998), British Royal Air Force officer
- John Thomas Hill (1811–1902), British Army officer

== Politics ==
=== United Kingdom ===
- John Hill (died 1408), English Member of Parliament and Justice of the King's Bench
- John Hill (MP for Wycombe) (fl. 1436), English MP for Wycombe
- John Hill (MP for Dorchester) (1589–1657), English Member of Parliament for Dorchester
- Sir John Hill, 3rd Baronet of the Hill baronets of Hawkstone (1740–1824), British MP for Shrewsbury
- John Hill (mayor) JP (1829–1909), English mayor of the city of Bradford, magistrate, and textile manufacturer
- John Hill (British politician) (1912–2007), British Member of Parliament and Member of the European Parliament

=== United States ===
- John Fremont Hill (1855–1912), governor of Maine
- John Hill (North Carolina politician) (1797–1861), United States Representative from North Carolina
- John Hill (Virginia politician) (1800–1880), United States Representative from Virginia
- John Hill (Florida politician) (born 1931)
- John Hill (New Jersey politician) (1821–1884), United States Representative from New Jersey
- John Hill (Texas politician) (1923–2007), American lawyer and politician
- John Jerome Hill (1918-1986), American politician
- John Philip Hill (1879–1941), United States Representative from Maryland
- John Y. Hill (1799–1859), American builder and Kentucky state legislator

=== Elsewhere ===
- John Hill (Australian politician) (born 1949), member of the South Australian House of Assembly

== Science ==
- John Christopher Columbus Hill (1828–1904), American engineer
- John Edwards Hill (1928–1997), British mammalogist
- John Hill (botanist) (1716–1775), English botanist, editor, journalist, and novelist
- John Hill (physician) (1931–1972), American plastic surgeon
- Sir John McGregor Hill (1921–2008), British nuclear physicist and administrator
- John Peter Hill (scientist) (born 1965), American solid state physicist and administrator

== Sports ==
=== Cricket ===
- John Hill (English cricketer) (1867–1963)
- John Hill (Irish cricketer) (1912–1984)
- Jack Hill (cricketer) (1923–1974), Australian cricketer
- John Hill (New Zealand cricketer) (1930–2002)
- John Hill (Queensland cricketer) (born 1956), Australian cricketer

=== Football ===
- John Ethan Hill (1865–1941), American mathematician and college football coach
- John Hill (Scottish footballer) (fl. 1891–1892)
- Johnny Hill (footballer) (1884–1???), Scottish footballer
- Jack Hill (footballer, born 1895), English footballer
- Jack Hill (footballer, born 1897) (1897–1972), English football player and manager
- Jack Hill (footballer, born 1908) (1908 – after 1937), English football forward for Newport County and Darlington
- John Hill (American football) (1950–2018)
- John Hill (New Zealand footballer) (born 1950), Irish-born New Zealand footballer
- John Mac Hill (1925–1995), Australian rules footballer for Collingwood
- John Tye Hill (born 1982), American football player

=== Other sports ===
- John Hill (baseball) (1876–1922), American Negro leagues player
- Pete Hill (John Preston Hill, 1882–1951), American baseball player
- Johnny Hill (1905–1929), Scottish boxer
- John Hill (rugby union) (fl. 1925), Australian rugby union player
- John Hill (rugby league), footballer of the 1940s and 1950s
- John Hill (boat racer) (1933–1993), British powerboat racer
- John Hill (wrestler) (1942–2010), Canadian wrestler
- John Hill (ice hockey) (born 1960), American ice hockey coach

== Other people ==
- John Hill (classicist) (1747–1805), Scottish minister and classicist
- John Hill (explorer) (c. 1810–1860), English explorer of South Australia
- John Edward Gray Hill (1839–1914), English solicitor
- John H. Hill (1852–1936), American lawyer, educator, school administrator, and soldier
- John Cathles Hill (1857–1915), Scottish architect
- John Hill (bishop) (1862–1943), English clergyman, inaugural Suffragan Bishop of Hulme
- John Hill (trade unionist) (1863–1945), British trade unionist
- John Wesley Hill (1863–1936), chancellor of Lincoln Memorial University in Harrogate, Tennessee
- John Hill (police officer) (1914–2004), British HM Chief Inspector of Constabulary for England and Wales
- John deKoven Hill (1920–1996), American architect
- John T. Hill (born 1934), teacher and author
- A pseudonym used by Victor Barker

== Fictional characters ==
- John Hill, in Cheers

== See also ==
- John P. Hill (disambiguation)
- John Ashdown-Hill (1949–2018), British historian
- James John Hill (1811–1882), English painter
- Johannes Hill (born 1988), German baritone
- John Hill & Company, a former British toy company
- John Hill House, a historic home in Erie, Pennsylvania
- John Sprunt Hill House, a historic house in Durham, North Carolina
- Jack Hill (disambiguation)
- Jon Hill (disambiguation)
- Jonathan Hill (disambiguation)
- John Hills (disambiguation)
