= John P. Hill =

John P. Hill may refer to:

- John Peter Hill (born 1965), Americian scientist
- John Philip Hill (1879–1941), United States Representative from Maryland
- John Preston Hill (1882–1951), American Negro leagues baseball player and manager, commonly known as Pete Hill
- John Hill (boat racer) (1933–1993), British powerboat racer born John Peter Hill

== See also ==
- John Hill (disambiguation)
