= Jonathan Hill =

Jonathan or Jonathon Hill may refer to:

- Jonathan Hill (architect) (1958–2023), English architect
- Jonathan Hill, Baron Hill of Oareford (born 1960), British politician
- Jonathan Hill (baseball) (fl. 1937), baseball player in the Negro leagues
- Jonathan Hill (cartoonist), American comics writer and artist
- Jonathan Hill (cricketer) (born 1990), Filipino-Australian cricketer
- Jonathan Hill (presenter) (fl. 20th and 21st century), Welsh television presenter
- Jonathan Hill (theologian) (born 1976), English theologian
- Jonathan N. C. Hill (fl. 21st century), British academic
- Jonathon D. Hill (born 1985), American politician
- Jonny Hill (rugby union) (Jonathan Paul Hill, born 1994), English professional rugby union player

== See also ==
- Jon Hill (disambiguation)
- John Hill (disambiguation)
- Hill (surname)
