= Jack Hill (disambiguation) =

Jack Hill (born 1933) is an American film director

Jack Hill may also refer to:

- Jack Hill (actor) (1887–1963), American actor who appeared in Laurel & Hardy films
- Jack Hill (footballer, born 1895), English football forward for Brights, Rochdale and Bacup Borough
- Jack Hill (footballer, born 1897) (1897–1972), England international football centre half and football manager
- Jack Hill (footballer, born 1908) (1908 – after 1937), English football forward for Newport County and Darlington
- Jack Hill (cricketer) (1923–1974), Australian Test cricketer
- Jack W. Hill (1928–1987), American with the distinction of holding Marine Corps enlisted service number one million (1,000,000)
- Jack Hill (Canadian football) (1932–2005), Canadian Football League running back
- Jack Hill (politician) (1944–2020), American politician and Georgia State Senator
- John (Jack) Mac Hill (1925–1995), Australian rules footballer for Collingwood

== See also ==
- Jack G. Hills (active 1966 and after), American theorist of stellar dynamics
- Jack Hills, a range of hills in Western Australia
- Jack Hills mine, an iron mine located in Pilbara, Western Australia
- John Hill (disambiguation)
- Hill (surname)
