= 1924 United States House of Representatives elections =

House elections for the 69th U.S. Congress

- November 4, 1924 (Note: September 8, 1924, in Maine)

All 435 seats in the United States House of Representatives 218 seats needed for a majority
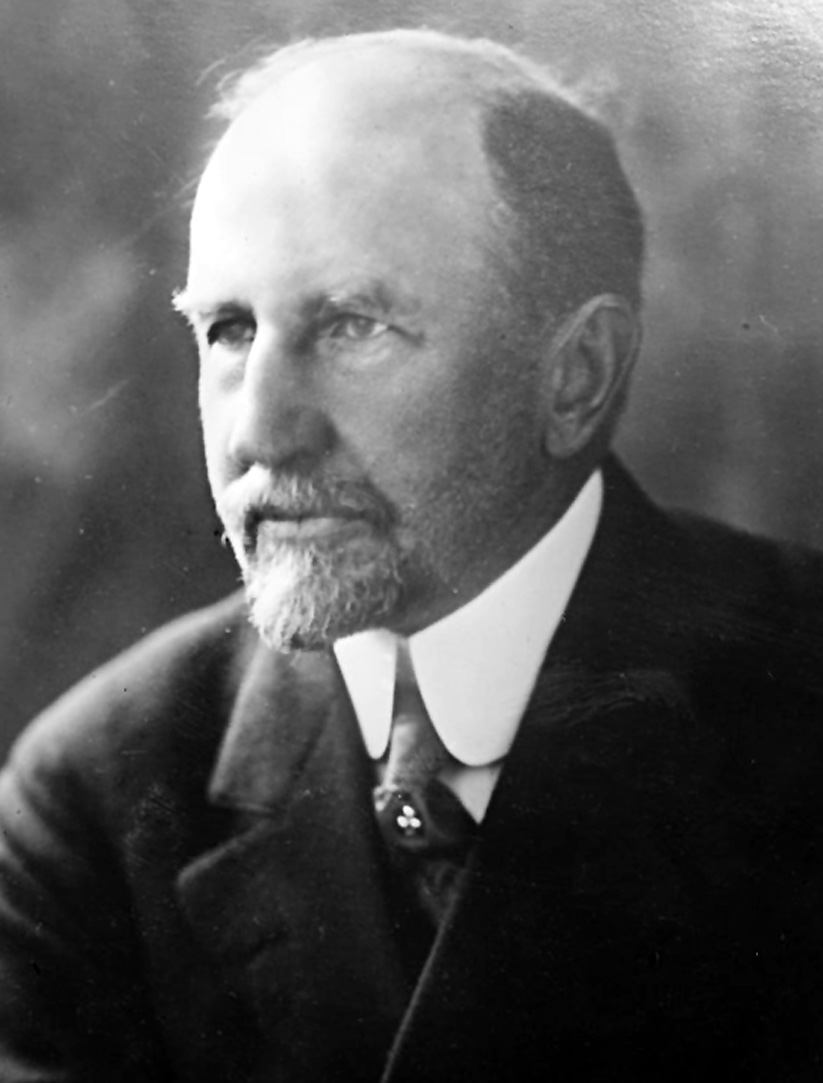

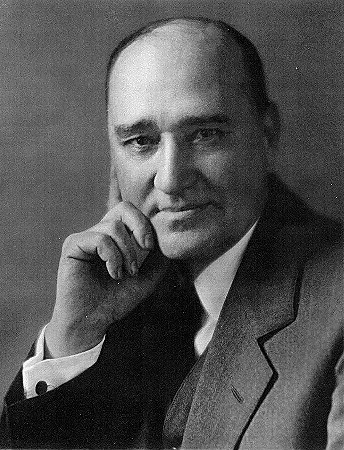
	Majority party	Minority party
Leader	Frederick Gillett (retired)	Finis J. Garrett
Party	Republican	Democratic
Leader since	May 19, 1919	March 4, 1923
Leader's seat	Massachusetts 2nd	Tennessee 9th
Last election	225 seats	207 seats
Seats won	247	183
Seat change	▲22	▼24
Popular vote	14,985,870	10,749,887
Percentage	56.06%	40.22%
Swing	▲4.20pp	▼4.42pp
	Third party	Fourth party
Party	Farmer–Labor	Socialist
Last election	2 seats	1 seat
Seats won	3	2
Seat change	▲1	▲1
Popular vote	370,118	315,712
Percentage	1.38%	1.18%
Swing	▲0.76pp	▼0.40pp
- Democratic hold Democratic gain Republican hold Republican gain Farmer–Labor hold Farmer–Labor gain Socialist hold Socialist gain
Speaker before election
Frederick Gillett
Republican
Elected Speaker
Nicholas Longworth
Republican

The 1924 United States House of Representatives elections were elections for the United States House of Representatives to elect members to serve in the 69th United States Congress. They were held for the most part on November 4, 1924, while Maine held theirs on September 8. They coincided with the election to a full term of President Calvin Coolidge, who had replaced Warren Harding following his death.

Coolidge's popularity helped his Republican Party to gain a net 22 seats from the opposition Democratic Party, cementing their majority. The burgeoning economy and Republican pro-business policies caused the party to gain popularity. An internal split somewhat reduced House gains, as a progressive faction of the party continued to antagonize party leadership.

In the early stages of the election, there were fears that the Republicans would be swamped at the polls due to several scandals in the administration of President Warren Harding. However, after the chief executive's death, his incidents were painted as personal problems that did not reflect the state of the party. The populist Farmer–Labor Party also gained a seat in Minnesota.

Mary Teresa Norton became the first female Democrat in the House when she won New Jersey's 12th district.

== Special elections ==
District	Incumbent			This race	
District	Member	Party	First elected	Results	Candidates
Kentucky 9	William J. Fields	Democratic	1910	Incumbent resigned December 11, 1923. New member elected January 24, 1924. Democratic hold.	▌ ✓ Fred M. Vinson (Democratic) 72.92%; ▌W. S. Yazell (Republican) 27.08%
Louisiana 2	H. Garland Dupré	Democratic	1910 (special)	Incumbent died February 21, 1924. New member elected April 22, 1924. Democratic hold.	▌ ✓ James Z. Spearing (Democratic) 99.81%; Scattering 0.19%
Kansas 2	Edward C. Little	Republican	1916	Incumbent died June 27, 1924. New member elected November 4, 1924. Republican hold. Winner was not a candidate for the next term; see below.	▌ ✓ U. S. Guyer (Republican) 62.01%; ▌Mrs. James A. Cable (Democratic) 37.99%
Maryland 5	Sydney Emanuel Mudd II	Republican	1914	Incumbent died October 11, 1924. New member elected November 4, 1924. Democratic gain. Winner also elected to the next term; see below.	▌ ✓ Stephen Warfield Gambrill (Democratic) 50.29%; ▌Thomas Brackett Reed Mudd (Republican) 49.71%
Massachusetts 15	William S. Greene	Republican	1898	Incumbent died September 22, 1924. New member elected November 4, 1924. Republican hold. Winner was not a candidate for the next term; see below.	▌ ✓ Robert M. Leach (Republican) 66.34%; ▌William H. Lomax (Democratic) 33.66%
North Dakota 2	George M. Young	Republican	1912	Incumbent resigned September 2, 1924. New member elected November 4, 1924. Republican hold. Winner also elected to the next term; see below.	▌ ✓ Thomas Hall (Republican) 50.96%; ▌Gerald P. Nye (Nonpartisan League) 49.04%

== Overall results ==
↓
183	6	246
Democratic	(Note: There were 3 Farmer–Labor, 2 Socialists, and 1 Progressive member)	Republican

Source: Election Statistics – Office of the Clerk

House seats
American Labor	0.23%
Democratic	42.07%
Farmer–Labor	0.69%
Republican	56.78%
Socialist	0.23%

Results shaded according to winning candidate's share of the popular vote

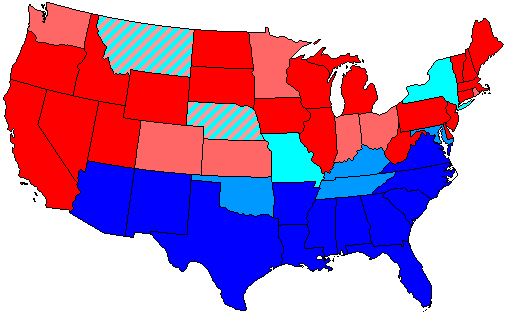
House seats by party holding plurality in state: 80+% Democratic / 80+% Republican; 60+ to 80% Democratic / 60+ to 80% Republican; up to 60% Democratic / up to 60% Republican

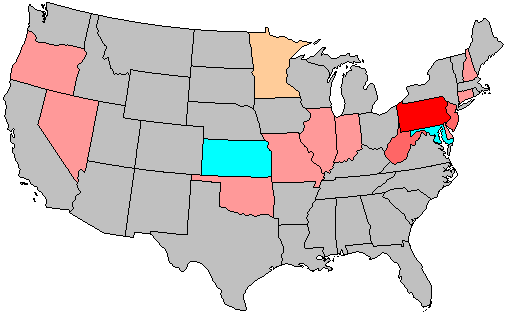
Change in seats: 6+ Democratic gain / 6+ Republican gain; 3-5 Democratic gain / 3-5 Republican gain; 1-2 Democratic gain / 1-2 Republican gain; 1-2 Farmer–Labor gain no net change

== Alabama ==
District	Incumbent			This race	
District	Representative	Party	First elected	Results	Candidates
Alabama 1	John McDuffie	Democratic	1918	Incumbent re-elected.	▌ ✓ John McDuffie (Democratic) 86.1%; ▌Frank J. Thompson (Republican) 13.9%
Alabama 2	J. Lister Hill	Democratic	1923 (special)	Incumbent re-elected.	▌ ✓ J. Lister Hill (Democratic); Uncontested
Alabama 3	Henry B. Steagall	Democratic	1914	Incumbent re-elected.	▌ ✓ Henry B. Steagall (Democratic) 87.7%; ▌Carlos E. Roberts (Republican) 12.3%
Alabama 4	Lamar Jeffers	Democratic	1921 (special)	Incumbent re-elected.	▌ ✓ Lamar Jeffers (Democratic) 75.6%; ▌J. C. Middleton (Republican) 24.4%
Alabama 5	William B. Bowling	Democratic	1920	Incumbent re-elected.	▌ ✓ William B. Bowling (Democratic) 78.2%; ▌John C. Walker (Republican) 21.8%
Alabama 6	William B. Oliver	Democratic	1914	Incumbent re-elected.	▌ ✓ William B. Oliver (Democratic); Uncontested
Alabama 7	Miles C. Allgood	Democratic	1922	Incumbent re-elected.	▌ ✓ Miles C. Allgood (Democratic) 57.1%; ▌B. S. Cooley (Republican) 42.9%
Alabama 8	Edward B. Almon	Democratic	1914	Incumbent re-elected.	▌ ✓ Edward B. Almon (Democratic) 81.5%; ▌G. H. Huckaba (Republican) 18.5%
Alabama 9	George Huddleston	Democratic	1914	Incumbent re-elected.	▌ ✓ George Huddleston (Democratic) 99.9%; ▌James Weatherly (Republican) 0.1%
Alabama 10	William B. Bankhead	Democratic	1916	Incumbent re-elected.	▌ ✓ William B. Bankhead (Democratic) 59.7%; ▌W. A. McMurray (Republican) 40.3%

== Arizona ==
Results by county Hayden: 60–70% 70–80% 80–90% >90%

District	Incumbent			This race	
District	Representative	Party	First elected	Results	Candidates
Arizona at-large	Carl Hayden	Democratic	1911 (special)	Incumbent re-elected.	▌ ✓ Carl Hayden (Democratic) 82.3%; ▌W. J. Galbraith (Republican) 17.6%; ▌George Maxwell (Independent) 0.1%

== Arkansas ==
District	Incumbent			This race	
District	Representative	Party	First elected	Results	Candidates
Arkansas 1	William J. Driver	Democratic	1920	Incumbent re-elected.	▌ ✓ William J. Driver (Democratic) 77.2%; ▌Virgil R. Greene (Republican) 22.8%
Arkansas 2	William A. Oldfield	Democratic	1908	Incumbent re-elected.	▌ ✓ William A. Oldfield (Democratic) 73.7%; ▌M. D. Bowers (Republican) 26.3%
Arkansas 3	John N. Tillman	Democratic	1914	Incumbent re-elected.	▌ ✓ John N. Tillman (Democratic) 60.0%; ▌J. S. Thompson (Republican) 40.0%
Arkansas 4	Otis Wingo	Democratic	1912	Incumbent re-elected.	▌ ✓ Otis Wingo (Democratic) 72.4%; ▌Charles A. Darling (Republican) 27.6%
Arkansas 5	Heartsill Ragon	Democratic	1922	Incumbent re-elected.	▌ ✓ Heartsill Ragon (Democratic) 76.9%; ▌Powell Clayton (Republican) 23.1%
Arkansas 6	James B. Reed	Democratic	1923 (special)	Incumbent re-elected.	▌ ✓ James B. Reed (Democratic) 77.0%; ▌Martin A. Eisele (Republican) 23.0%
Arkansas 7	Tilman B. Parks	Democratic	1920	Incumbent re-elected.	▌ ✓ Tilman B. Parks (Democratic) 76.6%; ▌J. K. Prescott (Republican) 23.4%

== California ==
District	Incumbent			This race	
District	Representative	Party	First elected	Results	Candidates
California 1	Clarence F. Lea	Democratic	1916	Incumbent re-elected.	▌ ✓ Clarence F. Lea (Democratic); Uncontested
California 2	John E. Raker	Democratic	1910	Incumbent re-elected.	▌ ✓ John E. Raker (Democratic); Uncontested
California 3	Charles F. Curry	Republican	1912	Incumbent re-elected.	▌ ✓ Charles F. Curry (Republican) 80.7%; ▌James H. Barkley (Socialist) 19.3%
California 4	Julius Kahn	Republican	1898	Incumbent re-elected.	▌ ✓ Julius Kahn (Republican) 81.0%; ▌William McDevitt (Socialist) 19.0%
California 5	Mae Nolan	Republican	1922	Incumbent retired. Republican hold.	▌ ✓ Lawrence J. Flaherty (Republican) 76.2%; ▌Isabel C. King (Socialist) 23.8%
California 6	James H. MacLafferty	Republican	1922	Incumbent lost renomination. Republican hold.	▌ ✓ Albert E. Carter (Republican) 57.5%; ▌John L. Davie (Democratic) 35.9%; ▌Herbert L. Coggins (Socialist) 6.6%
California 7	Henry E. Barbour	Republican	1918	Incumbent re-elected.	▌ ✓ Henry E. Barbour (Republican); Uncontested
California 8	Arthur M. Free	Republican	1920	Incumbent re-elected.	▌ ✓ Arthur M. Free (Republican) 97.9%; Others: ▌Arthur M. Clark (Independent) 1.5%; ▌Others (Independent) 0.6%
California 9	Walter F. Lineberger	Republican	1921 (special)	Incumbent re-elected.	▌ ✓ Walter F. Lineberger (Republican) 63.9%; ▌Charles H. Randall (Democratic) 36.1%
California 10	John D. Fredericks	Republican	1923 (special)	Incumbent re-elected.	▌ ✓ John D. Fredericks (Republican) 62.3%; ▌Robert W. Richardson (Democratic) 37.7%
California 11	Phil Swing	Republican	1920	Incumbent re-elected.	▌ ✓ Phil Swing (Republican); Uncontested

== Colorado ==
District	Incumbent			This race	
District	Representative	Party	First elected	Results	Candidates
Colorado 1	William N. Vaile	Republican	1918	Incumbent re-elected.	▌ ✓ William N. Vaile (Republican) 54.2%; ▌James G. Edgeworth (Democratic) 42.0%; ▌Thomas O. Spacey (Independent) 3.1%; ▌Louis A. Zeitlin (Independent) 0.8%
Colorado 2	Charles B. Timberlake	Republican	1914	Incumbent re-elected.	▌ ✓ Charles B. Timberlake (Republican) 56.9%; ▌James M. Taylor (Democratic) 35.0%; ▌James A. Owenby (Independent) 7.4%; ▌Nelson Dewey (Independent) 0.7%
Colorado 3	Guy U. Hardy	Republican	1918	Incumbent re-elected.	▌ ✓ Guy U. Hardy (Republican) 58.7%; ▌Charles B. Hughes (Democratic) 41.3%
Colorado 4	Edward T. Taylor	Democratic	1908	Incumbent re-elected.	▌ ✓ Edward T. Taylor (Democratic) 65.5%; ▌Webster S. Whinnery (Republican) 34.5%

== Connecticut ==
District	Incumbent			This race	
District	Representative	Party	First elected	Results	Candidates
Connecticut 1	E. Hart Fenn	Republican	1920	Incumbent re-elected.	▌ ✓ E. Hart Fenn (Republican) 66.8%; ▌Johnstone Vance (Democratic) 31.9%; ▌Fred M. Mansur (Socialist) 1.2%
Connecticut 2	Richard P. Freeman	Republican	1914	Incumbent re-elected.	▌ ✓ Richard P. Freeman (Republican) 65.0%; ▌Frank P. Fenton (Democratic) 34.3%; Others: ▌James D. Williams (Socialist) 0.6%; ▌William P. Barstow (Prohibition) 0.2%
Connecticut 3	John Q. Tilson	Republican	1914	Incumbent re-elected.	▌ ✓ John Q. Tilson (Republican) 67.9%; ▌William T. Hoyt (Democratic) 30.3%; ▌Louis O. Krahl (Socialist) 1.8%
Connecticut 4	Schuyler Merritt	Republican	1916	Incumbent re-elected.	▌ ✓ Schuyler Merritt (Republican) 71.1%; ▌William E. Walling (Democratic) 27.0%; ▌George R. Moffatt (Socialist) 1.9%
Connecticut 5	Patrick B. O'Sullivan	Democratic	1922	Incumbent lost re-election. Republican gain.	▌ ✓ James P. Glynn (Republican) 55.0%; ▌Patrick B. O'Sullivan (Democratic) 39.4%; ▌[FNU] O'Sullivan (Progressive) 5.6%

== Delaware ==
District	Incumbent			This race	
District	Representative	Party	First elected	Results	Candidates
Delaware at-large	William H. Boyce	Democratic	1922	Incumbent lost re-election. Republican gain.	▌ ✓ Robert G. Houston (Republican) 58.6%; ▌William H. Boyce (Democratic) 40.8%; ▌Florence Garvin (Independent) 0.6%

== Florida ==
District	Incumbent			This race	
District	Representative	Party	First elected	Results	Candidates
Florida 1	Herbert J. Drane	Democratic	1916	Incumbent re-elected.	▌ ✓ Herbert J. Drane (Democratic) 80.0%; ▌A. W. Gage (Republican) 20.0%
Florida 2	Frank Clark	Democratic	1904	Incumbent lost renomination. Democratic hold.	▌ ✓ Robert A. Green (Democratic) 90.6%; ▌H. O. Brown (Republican) 9.4%
Florida 3	John H. Smithwick	Democratic	1918	Incumbent re-elected.	▌ ✓ John H. Smithwick (Democratic) 84.1%; ▌J. H. Drummond (Republican) 15.9%
Florida 4	William J. Sears	Democratic	1914	Incumbent re-elected.	▌ ✓ William J. Sears (Democratic) 62.5%; ▌G. W. Bingham (Republican) 30.1%; ▌Billy Parker (American) 7.4%

== Georgia ==
District	Incumbent			This race	
District	Representative	Party	First elected	Results	Candidates
Georgia 1	R. Lee Moore	Democratic	1922	Incumbent lost renomination. Democratic hold.	▌ ✓ Charles G. Edwards (Democratic) 93.2%; ▌A. G. Aaron (Independent) 4.0%; ▌Don H. Clarke (Republican) 2.8%
Georgia 2	Frank Park	Democratic	1912	Incumbent lost renomination. Democratic hold.	▌ ✓ Edward E. Cox (Democratic); Uncontested
Georgia 3	Charles R. Crisp	Democratic	1912	Incumbent re-elected.	▌ ✓ Charles R. Crisp (Democratic); Uncontested
Georgia 4	William C. Wright	Democratic	1918	Incumbent re-elected.	▌ ✓ William C. Wright (Democratic); Uncontested
Georgia 5	William D. Upshaw	Democratic	1918	Incumbent re-elected.	▌ ✓ William D. Upshaw (Democratic); Uncontested
Georgia 6	James W. Wise	Democratic	1914	Incumbent retired. Democratic hold.	▌ ✓ Samuel Rutherford (Democratic); Uncontested
Georgia 7	Gordon Lee	Democratic	1904	Incumbent re-elected.	▌ ✓ Gordon Lee (Democratic) 99.9%; ▌A. T. Atwater (Independent) 0.1%
Georgia 8	Charles H. Brand	Democratic	1916	Incumbent re-elected.	▌ ✓ Charles H. Brand (Democratic); Uncontested
Georgia 9	Thomas M. Bell	Democratic	1904	Incumbent re-elected.	▌ ✓ Thomas M. Bell (Democratic) 87.7%; ▌J. M. Johnson (Republican) 12.3%
Georgia 10	Carl Vinson	Democratic	1914	Incumbent re-elected.	▌ ✓ Carl Vinson (Democratic); Uncontested
Georgia 11	William C. Lankford	Democratic	1918	Incumbent re-elected.	▌ ✓ William C. Lankford (Democratic); Uncontested
Georgia 12	William W. Larsen	Democratic	1916	Incumbent re-elected.	▌ ✓ William W. Larsen (Democratic); Uncontested

== Idaho ==
District	Incumbent			This race	
District	Representative	Party	First elected	Results	Candidates
Idaho 1	Burton L. French	Republican	1916	Incumbent re-elected.	▌ ✓ Burton L. French (Republican) 61.8%; ▌Perry Mitchell (Democratic) 37.5%; ▌Roy Rabbit (Socialist) 0.6%
Idaho 2	Addison T. Smith	Republican	1912	Incumbent re-elected.	▌ ✓ Addison T. Smith (Republican) 54.5%; ▌William A. Shuldberg (Progressive) 28.7%; ▌Asher B. Wilson (Democratic) 16.6%; ▌Clifford Higby (Socialist) 0.2%

== Illinois ==
District	Incumbent			This race	
District	Representative	Party	First elected	Results	Candidates
Illinois 1	Martin B. Madden	Republican	1904	Incumbent re-elected.	▌ ✓ Martin B. Madden (Republican) 73.1%; ▌James F. Doyle (Democratic) 22.8%; ▌Samuel A. T. Watkins (Independent) 3.7%; Others: ▌Elmer Whitmore (Socialist) 0.4%; ▌Gordon Owens (Independent) 0.1%
Illinois 2	Morton D. Hull	Republican	1923 (special)	Incumbent re-elected.	▌ ✓ Morton D. Hull (Republican) 74.5%; ▌Frank A. Wright (Democratic) 24.6%; ▌William Frank (Socialist) 0.8%
Illinois 3	Elliott W. Sproul	Republican	1920	Incumbent re-elected.	▌ ✓ Elliott W. Sproul (Republican) 67.0%; ▌Joseph F. Timmis (Democratic) 32.3%; ▌Kellam Foster (Socialist) 0.7%
Illinois 4	Thomas A. Doyle	Democratic	1923 (special)	Incumbent re-elected.	▌ ✓ Thomas A. Doyle (Democratic) 56.0%; ▌Stanley Jankowski (Republican) 43.3%; Others: ▌John F. Krause (Socialist) 0.7%; ▌Joseph Podkulski (Independent) 0.1%
Illinois 5	Adolph J. Sabath	Democratic	1906	Incumbent re-elected.	▌ ✓ Adolph J. Sabath (Democratic) 57.8%; ▌Bernard A. Weaver (Republican) 41.4%; ▌Leon Hancock (Socialist) 0.8%
Illinois 6	James R. Buckley	Democratic	1922	Incumbent lost re-election. Republican gain.	▌ ✓ John J. Gorman (Republican) 67.8%; ▌James R. Buckley (Democratic) 31.2%; ▌Edward Hangsen (Socialist) 1.0%
Illinois 7	M. Alfred Michaelson	Republican	1920	Incumbent re-elected.	▌ ✓ M. Alfred Michaelson (Republican) 67.7%; ▌Hynek M. Howell (Democratic) 23.4%; ▌Edward A. Russell (Independent) 6.6%; Others: ▌John M. Collins (Socialist) 2.0%; ▌Samuel Hammersmark (Communist) 0.3%
Illinois 8	Stanley H. Kunz	Democratic	1920	Incumbent re-elected.	▌ ✓ Stanley H. Kunz (Democratic) 53.1%; ▌Ernest D. Potts (Republican) 41.3%; ▌Gerard Kasmarek (Independent) 5.0%; Others: ▌William L. Long (Socialist) 0.5%; ▌George Maurer (Independent) 0.0%
Illinois 9	Frederick A. Britten	Republican	1912	Incumbent re-elected.	▌ ✓ Frederick A. Britten (Republican) 76.6%; ▌Urban A. Lavery (Democratic) 22.4%; Others: ▌Evar Anderson (Socialist) 0.8%; ▌John W. Johnstone (Independent) 0.2%
Illinois 10	Carl R. Chindblom	Republican	1918	Incumbent re-elected.	▌ ✓ Carl R. Chindblom (Republican) 80.0%; ▌John P. Reed (Democratic) 19.3%; ▌Kunia Sissman (Socialist) 0.7%
Illinois 11	Frank R. Reid	Republican	1922	Incumbent re-elected.	▌ ✓ Frank R. Reid (Republican) 84.1%; ▌Charles L. Schwartz (Democratic) 15.3%; ▌George Chant (Socialist) 0.5%
Illinois 12	Charles Eugene Fuller	Republican	1914	Incumbent re-elected.	▌ ✓ Charles Eugene Fuller (Republican) 84.5%; ▌Marvin C. Parsons (Democratic) 14.9%; ▌Fred N. Hale (Socialist) 0.7%
Illinois 13	John C. McKenzie	Republican	1910	Incumbent retired. Republican hold.	▌ ✓ William Richard Johnson (Republican) 77.8%; ▌William G. Curtiss (Democratic) 21.7%; Others: ▌Xavier F. Gehant (Socialist) 0.4%; ▌John Erefeldt (Independent) 0.1%
Illinois 14	William J. Graham	Republican	1916	Incumbent resigned June 7, 1924. Republican hold.	▌ ✓ John Clayton Allen (Republican) 64.7%; ▌William A. Schaeffer (Democratic) 35.3%
Illinois 15	Edward John King	Republican	1914	Incumbent re-elected.	▌ ✓ Edward John King (Republican) 69.2%; ▌Henry E. Schmiedeskamp (Democratic) 30.0%; ▌John C. Slodin (Socialist) 0.8%
Illinois 16	William E. Hull	Republican	1922	Incumbent re-elected.	▌ ✓ William E. Hull (Republican) 55.4%; ▌Charles C. Hatcher (Democratic) 43.9%; ▌James Lofthouse (Socialist) 0.6%
Illinois 17	Frank H. Funk	Republican	1920	Incumbent re-elected.	▌ ✓ Frank H. Funk (Republican) 60.1%; ▌Frank Gillespie (Democratic) 39.6%; ▌Harry A. Crawford (Socialist) 0.4%
Illinois 18	William P. Holaday	Republican	1922	Incumbent re-elected.	▌ ✓ William P. Holaday (Republican) 64.4%; ▌Andrew B. Dennis (Democratic) 35.3%; ▌James P. Miller (Socialist) 0.4%
Illinois 19	Allen F. Moore	Republican	1920	Incumbent retired. Republican hold.	▌ ✓ Charles Adkins (Republican) 56.5%; ▌Edward F. Poorman (Democratic) 43.1%; ▌John R. Hefner (Socialist) 0.4%
Illinois 20	Henry T. Rainey	Democratic	1922	Incumbent re-elected.	▌ ✓ Henry T. Rainey (Democratic) 53.0%; ▌Guy L. Shaw (Republican) 47.0%
Illinois 21	J. Earl Major	Democratic	1922	Incumbent lost re-election. Republican gain.	▌ ✓ Loren E. Wheeler (Republican) 50.0%; ▌J. Earl Major (Democratic) 48.7%; ▌Max P. Heinz (Socialist) 1.3%
Illinois 22	Edward E. Miller	Republican	1922	Incumbent retired. Republican hold.	▌ ✓ Edward M. Irwin (Republican) 57.7%; ▌Edward E. Campbell (Democratic) 41.5%; ▌Roy F. Boyd (Socialist) 0.8%
Illinois 23	William W. Arnold	Democratic	1922	Incumbent re-elected.	▌ ✓ William W. Arnold (Democratic) 53.9%; ▌Charles J. Metzger (Republican) 45.7%; ▌Howard L. Bollinger (Socialist) 0.4%
Illinois 24	Thomas Sutler Williams	Republican	1914	Incumbent re-elected.	▌ ✓ Thomas Sutler Williams (Republican) 54.1%; ▌H. Robert Fowler (Democratic) 45.9%
Illinois 25	Edward E. Denison	Republican	1914	Incumbent re-elected.	▌ ✓ Edward E. Denison (Republican) 58.1%; ▌Philip N. Lewis (Democratic) 41.5%; ▌David W. Kennedy (Socialist) 0.4%
Illinois at-large	Richard Yates Jr.	Republican	1918	Incumbent re-elected.	▌ ✓ Richard Yates Jr. (Republican) 34.5%; ▌Henry R. Rathbone (Republican) 34.4%; ▌Mary Ward Hart (Democratic) 15.2%; ▌Allen D. Albert (Democratic) 14.9%; Others: ▌Gus C. Sandberg (Socialist) 0.4%; ▌John C. Flora (Socialist) 0.4%; ▌J. E. Procum (Socialist Labor) 0.1%; ▌C. E. Clouse (Socialist Labor) 0.1%; ▌Robert Minor (Workers) 0.1%; ▌E. B. Hewlett (Workers) 0.0%; ▌P. H. Morrissey (Ind. Republican) 0.0%; ▌Dora Welty (Commonwealth Land) 0.0%; ▌James W. Hill (Commonwealth Land) 0.0%
Illinois at-large	Henry R. Rathbone	Republican	1922	Incumbent re-elected.	▌ ✓ Richard Yates Jr. (Republican) 34.5%; ▌Henry R. Rathbone (Republican) 34.4%; ▌Mary Ward Hart (Democratic) 15.2%; ▌Allen D. Albert (Democratic) 14.9%; Others: ▌Gus C. Sandberg (Socialist) 0.4%; ▌John C. Flora (Socialist) 0.4%; ▌J. E. Procum (Socialist Labor) 0.1%; ▌C. E. Clouse (Socialist Labor) 0.1%; ▌Robert Minor (Workers) 0.1%; ▌E. B. Hewlett (Workers) 0.0%; ▌P. H. Morrissey (Ind. Republican) 0.0%; ▌Dora Welty (Commonwealth Land) 0.0%; ▌James W. Hill (Commonwealth Land) 0.0%

== Indiana ==
District	Incumbent			This race	
District	Representative	Party	First elected	Results	Candidates
Indiana 1	William E. Wilson	Democratic	1922	Incumbent lost re-election. Republican gain.	▌ ✓ Harry E. Rowbottom (Republican) 52.1%; ▌William E. Wilson (Democratic) 47.9%
Indiana 2	Arthur H. Greenwood	Democratic	1922	Incumbent re-elected.	▌ ✓ Arthur H. Greenwood (Democratic) 50.4%; ▌John E. Sedwick (Republican) 49.6%
Indiana 3	Frank Gardner	Democratic	1922	Incumbent re-elected.	▌ ✓ Frank Gardner (Democratic) 52.9%; ▌Lindley Barlow (Republican) 47.1%
Indiana 4	Harry C. Canfield	Democratic	1922	Incumbent re-elected.	▌ ✓ Harry C. Canfield (Democratic) 58.2%; ▌James W. Hill (Republican) 41.8%
Indiana 5	Everett Sanders	Republican	1916	Incumbent retired. Republican hold.	▌ ✓ Noble J. Johnson (Republican) 61.8%; ▌J. R. Shannon (Democratic) 38.2%
Indiana 6	Richard N. Elliott	Republican	1918	Incumbent re-elected.	▌ ✓ Richard N. Elliott (Republican) 55.3%; ▌Laurence A. Handley (Democratic) 44.7%
Indiana 7	Merrill Moores	Republican	1914	Incumbent lost renomination. Republican hold.	▌ ✓ Ralph E. Updike (Republican) 60.3%; ▌Joseph P. Turk (Democratic) 39.7%
Indiana 8	Albert H. Vestal	Republican	1916	Incumbent re-elected.	▌ ✓ Albert H. Vestal (Republican) 55.8%; ▌John A. M. Adair (Democratic) 44.2%
Indiana 9	Fred S. Purnell	Republican	1916	Incumbent re-elected.	▌ ✓ Fred S. Purnell (Republican) 55.0%; ▌James P. Davis (Democratic) 45.0%
Indiana 10	William R. Wood	Republican	1914	Incumbent re-elected.	▌ ✓ William R. Wood (Republican) 66.8%; ▌Harry O. Rhoades (Democratic) 33.2%
Indiana 11	Samuel E. Cook	Democratic	1922	Incumbent lost re-election. Republican gain.	▌ ✓ Albert R. Hall (Republican) 54.5%; ▌Samuel E. Cook (Democratic) 45.5%
Indiana 12	Louis W. Fairfield	Republican	1916	Incumbent lost renomination. Republican hold.	▌ ✓ David Hogg (Republican) 58.4%; ▌Charles W. Branstrator (Democratic) 41.6%
Indiana 13	Andrew J. Hickey	Republican	1918	Incumbent re-elected.	▌ ✓ Andrew J. Hickey (Republican) 61.7%; ▌James L. Harman (Democratic) 38.3%

== Iowa ==
District	Incumbent			This race	
District	Representative	Party	First elected	Results	Candidates
Iowa 1	William F. Kopp	Republican	1920	Incumbent re-elected.	▌ ✓ William F. Kopp (Republican) 71.4%; ▌James M. Bell (Democratic) 28.6%
Iowa 2	Harry E. Hull	Republican	1914	Incumbent lost renomination. Republican hold.	▌ ✓ F. Dickinson Letts (Republican) 59.7%; ▌Ralph U. Thompson (Democratic) 39.9%; ▌Lester Myers (Independent) 0.4%
Iowa 3	Thomas J. B. Robinson	Republican	1922	Incumbent re-elected.	▌ ✓ Thomas J. B. Robinson (Republican) 68.5%; ▌Willis N. Birdsall (Democratic) 31.5%
Iowa 4	Gilbert N. Haugen	Republican	1898	Incumbent re-elected.	▌ ✓ Gilbert N. Haugen (Republican) 71.1%; ▌J. M. Berry (Democratic) 28.9%
Iowa 5	Cyrenus Cole	Republican	1921 (special)	Incumbent re-elected.	▌ ✓ Cyrenus Cole (Republican) 70.2%; ▌W. N. Townsend (Democratic) 29.8%
Iowa 6	C. William Ramseyer	Republican	1914	Incumbent re-elected.	▌ ✓ C. William Ramseyer (Republican) 69.1%; ▌James V. Curran (Democratic) 30.7%; ▌Carrie I. Engle (Independent) 0.2%
Iowa 7	Cassius C. Dowell	Republican	1914	Incumbent re-elected.	▌ ✓ Cassius C. Dowell (Republican) 78.3%; ▌William M. Wade (Democratic) 21.7%
Iowa 8	Hiram Kinsman Evans	Republican	1923 (special)	Incumbent retired. Republican hold.	▌ ✓ Lloyd Thurston (Republican) 62.5%; ▌Le Roy Munyon (Democratic) 37.5%
Iowa 9	William R. Green	Republican	1910	Incumbent re-elected.	▌ ✓ William R. Green (Republican) 68.0%; ▌Charles F. Paschell (Democratic) 31.5%; ▌Mads Madson (Independent) 0.5%
Iowa 10	L. J. Dickinson	Republican	1918	Incumbent re-elected.	▌ ✓ L. J. Dickinson (Republican) 75.4%; ▌Richard F. Mitchell (Democratic) 24.6%
Iowa 11	William D. Boies	Republican	1918	Incumbent re-elected.	▌ ✓ William D. Boies (Republican) 61.5%; ▌A. Sykes (Democratic) 38.5%

== Kansas ==
District	Incumbent			This race	
District	Representative	Party	First elected	Results	Candidates
Kansas 1	Daniel R. Anthony Jr.	Republican	1907 (special)	Incumbent re-elected.	▌ ✓ Daniel R. Anthony Jr. (Republican) 70.8%; ▌Lee Eppinger (Democratic) 29.2%
Kansas 2	Edward C. Little	Republican	1916	Incumbent died June 27, 1924. Democratic gain. Winner was not elected to finish the term.	▌ ✓ Chauncey B. Little (Democratic) 48.8%; ▌Russell Dyer (Republican) 44.6%; ▌Arthur L. McKenney (Independent) 6.6%
Kansas 3	William H. Sproul	Republican	1922	Incumbent re-elected.	▌ ✓ William H. Sproul (Republican) 57.3%; ▌Charles Stephens (Democratic) 42.7%
Kansas 4	Homer Hoch	Republican	1918	Incumbent re-elected.	▌ ✓ Homer Hoch (Republican) 65.0%; ▌R. W. Woodside (Democratic) 35.0%
Kansas 5	James G. Strong	Republican	1918	Incumbent re-elected.	▌ ✓ James G. Strong (Republican) 60.0%; ▌Clarence E. Hatfield (Democratic) 40.0%
Kansas 6	Hays B. White	Republican	1918	Incumbent re-elected.	▌ ✓ Hays B. White (Republican) 52.5%; ▌John R. Connelly (Democratic) 47.5%
Kansas 7	Jasper N. Tincher	Republican	1918	Incumbent re-elected.	▌ ✓ Jasper N. Tincher (Republican) 54.6%; ▌Nellie Cline (Democratic) 45.4%
Kansas 8	William A. Ayres	Democratic	1914; 1920 (lost); 1922	Incumbent re-elected.	▌ ✓ William A. Ayres (Democratic) 60.6%; ▌Chester I. Long (Republican) 39.4%

== Kentucky ==
District	Incumbent			This race	
District	Representative	Party	First elected	Results	Candidates
Kentucky 1	Alben W. Barkley	Democratic	1912	Incumbent re-elected.	▌ ✓ Alben W. Barkley (Democratic) 66.9%; ▌Robert L. Myre (Republican) 33.1%
Kentucky 2	David Hayes Kincheloe	Democratic	1914	Incumbent re-elected.	▌ ✓ David Hayes Kincheloe (Democratic); Uncontested
Kentucky 3	Robert Y. Thomas Jr.	Democratic	1908	Incumbent re-elected.	▌ ✓ Robert Y. Thomas Jr. (Democratic) 52.7%; ▌George Baker (Republican) 47.3%
Kentucky 4	Ben Johnson	Democratic	1906	Incumbent re-elected.	▌ ✓ Ben Johnson (Democratic) 53.5%; ▌Z. T. Proctor (Republican) 45.7%; ▌R. H. McMullin (Independent) 0.7%
Kentucky 5	Maurice Thatcher	Republican	1922	Incumbent re-elected.	▌ ✓ Maurice Thatcher (Republican) 54.5%; ▌Sam H. McMeekin (Democratic) 45.5%
Kentucky 6	Arthur B. Rouse	Democratic	1910	Incumbent re-elected.	▌ ✓ Arthur B. Rouse (Democratic) 49.5%; ▌Benedict S. Landram (Republican) 29.8%; ▌William H. Bornhorst (Progressive) 20.7%
Kentucky 7	Joseph W. Morris	Democratic	1923 (special)	Incumbent retired. Democratic hold.	▌ ✓ Virgil Chapman (Democratic); Uncontested
Kentucky 8	Ralph W. E. Gilbert	Democratic	1920	Incumbent re-elected.	▌ ✓ Ralph W. E. Gilbert (Democratic); Uncontested
Kentucky 9	Fred M. Vinson	Democratic	1924 (special)	Incumbent re-elected.	▌ ✓ Fred M. Vinson (Democratic) 54.5%; ▌George Osborne (Republican) 45.5%
Kentucky 10	John W. Langley	Republican	1906	Incumbent re-elected.	▌ ✓ John W. Langley (Republican) 59.7%; ▌Alex L. Ratliff (Democratic) 39.6%; ▌John S. Layne (Independent) 0.7%
Kentucky 11	John M. Robsion	Republican	1918	Incumbent re-elected.	▌ ✓ John M. Robsion (Republican) 74.4%; ▌Nat B. Sewell (Democratic) 25.6%

== Louisiana ==
District	Incumbent			This race	
District	Representative	Party	First elected	Results	Candidates
Louisiana 1	James O'Connor	Democratic	1918	Incumbent re-elected.	▌ ✓ James O'Connor (Democratic); Uncontested
Louisiana 2	James Z. Spearing	Democratic	1924 (special)	Incumbent re-elected.	▌ ✓ James Z. Spearing (Democratic); Uncontested
Louisiana 3	Whitmell P. Martin	Democratic	1914	Incumbent re-elected.	▌ ✓ Whitmell P. Martin (Democratic); Uncontested
Louisiana 4	John N. Sandlin	Democratic	1920	Incumbent re-elected.	▌ ✓ John N. Sandlin (Democratic); Uncontested
Louisiana 5	Riley J. Wilson	Democratic	1914	Incumbent re-elected.	▌ ✓ Riley J. Wilson (Democratic); Uncontested
Louisiana 6	George K. Favrot	Democratic	1920	Incumbent lost renomination. Democratic hold.	▌ ✓ Bolivar E. Kemp (Democratic); Uncontested
Louisiana 7	Ladislas Lazaro	Democratic	1912	Incumbent re-elected.	▌ ✓ Ladislas Lazaro (Democratic); Uncontested
Louisiana 8	James Benjamin Aswell	Democratic	1912	Incumbent re-elected.	▌ ✓ James Benjamin Aswell (Democratic); Uncontested

== Maine ==
District	Incumbent			This race	
District	Representative	Party	First elected	Results	Candidates
Maine 1	Carroll L. Beedy	Republican	1920	Incumbent re-elected.	▌ ✓ Carroll L. Beedy (Republican) 59.2%; ▌William M. Ingraham (Democratic) 40.8%
Maine 2	Wallace H. White	Republican	1916	Incumbent re-elected.	▌ ✓ Wallace H. White (Republican) 57.8%; ▌Bertrand G. McIntire (Democratic) 42.2%
Maine 3	John E. Nelson	Republican	1922	Incumbent re-elected.	▌ ✓ John E. Nelson (Republican) 62.1%; ▌Leon O. Tebbetts (Democratic) 37.9%
Maine 4	Ira G. Hersey	Republican	1916	Incumbent re-elected.	▌ ✓ Ira G. Hersey (Republican) 62.0%; ▌Clinton G. Stevens (Democratic) 38.0%

== Maryland ==
District	Incumbent			This race	
District	Representative	Party	First elected	Results	Candidates
Maryland 1	T. Alan Goldsborough	Democratic	1920	Incumbent re-elected.	▌ ✓ T. Alan Goldsborough (Democratic) 57.0%; ▌Harry T. Phoebus (Republican) 43.0%
Maryland 2	Millard Tydings	Democratic	1922	Incumbent re-elected.	▌ ✓ Millard Tydings (Democratic) 53.2%; ▌Edward R. Simpson (Republican) 44.7%; ▌Christian B. Keller (Socialist) 2.2%
Maryland 3	John P. Hill	Republican	1920	Incumbent re-elected.	▌ ✓ John P. Hill (Republican) 61.5%; ▌George Heller (Democratic) 36.8%; ▌Samuel M. Neistadt (Socialist) 1.7%
Maryland 4	J. Charles Linthicum	Democratic	1910	Incumbent re-elected.	▌ ✓ J. Charles Linthicum (Democratic) 59.9%; ▌John R. M. Staum (Republican) 38.0%; ▌Gustave P. Dill (Socialist) 2.1%
Maryland 5	Sydney Emanuel Mudd II	Republican	1914	Incumbent died. Democratic gain.	▌ ✓ Stephen W. Gambrill (Democratic) 51.6%; ▌Thomas B. R. Mudd (Republican) 48.4%
Maryland 6	Frederick N. Zihlman	Republican	1916	Incumbent re-elected.	▌ ✓ Frederick N. Zihlman (Republican) 53.8%; ▌David C. Winebrenner III (Democratic) 44.6%; ▌P. Oswald Weber (Socialist) 1.5%

== Massachusetts ==
District	Incumbent			This race	
District	Representative	Party	First elected	Results	Candidates
Massachusetts 1	Allen T. Treadway	Republican	1912	Incumbent re-elected.	▌ ✓ Allen T. Treadway (Republican) 58.5%; ▌Thomas F. Cassidy (Democratic) 41.5%
Massachusetts 2	Frederick H. Gillett	Republican	1892	Incumbent retired to run for U.S. senator. Republican hold.	▌ ✓ George B. Churchill (Republican) 57.3%; ▌Joseph E. Kerigan (Democratic) 42.7%
Massachusetts 3	Calvin Paige	Republican	1913 (special)	Incumbent retired. Republican hold.	▌ ✓ Frank H. Foss (Republican) 64.4%; ▌Wilfred J. Lamoureux (Democratic) 35.6%
Massachusetts 4	Samuel Winslow	Republican	1912	Incumbent retired. Republican hold.	▌ ✓ George R. Stobbs (Republican) 57.3%; ▌William H. Dyer (Democratic) 41.2%; ▌Michael T. Flaherty (Ind. Progressive) 1.5%
Massachusetts 5	John Jacob Rogers	Republican	1912	Incumbent re-elected.	▌ ✓ John Jacob Rogers (Republican) 67.4%; ▌Humphrey O'Sullivan (Democratic) 32.6%
Massachusetts 6	A. Piatt Andrew	Republican	1921 (special)	Incumbent re-elected.	▌ ✓ A. Piatt Andrew (Republican); Uncontested
Massachusetts 7	William P. Connery Jr.	Democratic	1922	Incumbent re-elected.	▌ ✓ William P. Connery Jr. (Democratic) 55.7%; ▌Charles A. Littlefield (Republican) 44.3%
Massachusetts 8	Frederick W. Dallinger	Republican	1914	Incumbent retired to run for U.S. senator. Republican hold.	▌ ✓ Harry Irving Thayer (Republican) 62.0%; ▌Daniel P. Leahy (Democratic) 38.0%
Massachusetts 9	Charles L. Underhill	Republican	1920	Incumbent re-elected.	▌ ✓ Charles L. Underhill (Republican) 58.9%; ▌Arthur D. Healey (Democratic) 41.1%
Massachusetts 10	Peter Francis Tague	Democratic	1914; 1919 (special)	Incumbent lost re-election as an Independent. Democratic hold.	▌ ✓ John J. Douglass (Democratic) 58.9%; ▌Peter Francis Tague (Independent) 26.2%; ▌James E. Maguire (Republican) 12.6%; ▌Thomas J. Giblin (Ind. Progressive) 2.3%
Massachusetts 11	George H. Tinkham	Republican	1914	Incumbent re-elected.	▌ ✓ George H. Tinkham (Republican) 66.0%; ▌Timothy J. Driscoll (Democratic) 34.0%
Massachusetts 12	James A. Gallivan	Democratic	1914	Incumbent re-elected.	▌ ✓ James A. Gallivan (Democratic) 73.3%; ▌Howard A. Morton (Republican) 26.7%
Massachusetts 13	Robert Luce	Republican	1918	Incumbent re-elected.	▌ ✓ Robert Luce (Republican) 69.3%; ▌Edwin F. Tutle (Democratic) 30.7%
Massachusetts 14	Louis A. Frothingham	Republican	1920	Incumbent re-elected.	▌ ✓ Louis A. Frothingham (Republican) 69.1%; ▌David W. Murray (Democratic) 30.9%
Massachusetts 15	William S. Greene	Republican	1898	Incumbent died. Republican hold.	▌ ✓ Joseph W. Martin Jr. (Republican) 58.4%; ▌Arthur J. B. Cartier (Democratic) 41.6%
Massachusetts 16	Charles L. Gifford	Republican	1922	Incumbent re-elected.	▌ ✓ Charles L. Gifford (Republican) 69.5%; ▌James P. Doran (Democratic) 25.8%; ▌Alvin C. Howes (Ind. Progressive) 4.8%

== Michigan ==
District	Incumbent			This race	
District	Representative	Party	First elected	Results	Candidates
Michigan 1	Robert H. Clancy	Democratic	1922	Incumbent lost re-election. Republican gain.	▌ ✓ John B. Sosnowski (Republican) 67.5%; ▌Robert H. Clancy (Democratic) 32.2%; ▌August Schmidt (Socialist) 0.3%
Michigan 2	Earl C. Michener	Republican	1918	Incumbent re-elected.	▌ ✓ Earl C. Michener (Republican) 73.8%; ▌James W. Helme (Democratic) 26.2%
Michigan 3	Arthur B. Williams	Republican	1923 (special)	Incumbent re-elected.	▌ ✓ Arthur B. Williams (Republican) 65.1%; ▌Claude S. Carney (Democratic) 34.9%
Michigan 4	John C. Ketcham	Republican	1920	Incumbent re-elected.	▌ ✓ John C. Ketcham (Republican) 70.3%; ▌Fremont Evans (Democratic) 29.6%; ▌Frank Taylor (Socialist) 0.1%
Michigan 5	Carl E. Mapes	Republican	1912	Incumbent re-elected.	▌ ✓ Carl E. Mapes (Republican) 81.3%; ▌Harry C. White (Democratic) 18.7%
Michigan 6	Grant M. Hudson	Republican	1922	Incumbent re-elected.	▌ ✓ Grant M. Hudson (Republican) 85.6%; ▌Willis M. Brewer (Democratic) 14.4%
Michigan 7	Louis C. Cramton	Republican	1912	Incumbent re-elected.	▌ ✓ Louis C. Cramton (Republican) 80.8%; ▌Varnum J. Bowers (Democratic) 19.1%; ▌Melvin Lamb (Socialist Labor) 0.1%
Michigan 8	Bird J. Vincent	Republican	1922	Incumbent re-elected.	▌ ✓ Bird J. Vincent (Republican) 77.5%; ▌William A. Seegmiller (Democratic) 22.5%
Michigan 9	James C. McLaughlin	Republican	1906	Incumbent re-elected.	▌ ✓ James C. McLaughlin (Republican) 84.1%; ▌Charles M. Black (Democratic) 15.6%; ▌Edward O. Foss (Socialist) 0.3%
Michigan 10	Roy O. Woodruff	Republican	1920	Incumbent re-elected.	▌ ✓ Roy O. Woodruff (Republican) 81.3%; ▌Judson E. Richardson (Democratic) 18.7%
Michigan 11	Frank D. Scott	Republican	1914	Incumbent re-elected.	▌ ✓ Frank D. Scott (Republican) 73.3%; ▌Prentiss M. Brown (Democratic) 26.7%
Michigan 12	W. Frank James	Republican	1914	Incumbent re-elected.	▌ ✓ W. Frank James (Republican); Uncontested
Michigan 13	Clarence J. McLeod	Republican	1922	Incumbent re-elected.	▌ ✓ Clarence J. McLeod (Republican) 88.4%; ▌Joel L. Moore (Democratic) 11.6%

== Minnesota ==
District	Incumbent			This race	
District	Representative	Party	First elected	Results	Candidates
Minnesota 1	Sydney Anderson	Republican	1910	Incumbent retired. Republican hold.	▌ ✓ Allen J. Furlow (Republican) 53.4%; ▌Julius J. Reiter (Farmer–Labor) 36.8%; ▌Lindley B. Hanna (Democratic) 9.9%
Minnesota 2	Frank Clague	Republican	1920	Incumbent re-elected.	▌ ✓ Frank Clague (Republican) 60.5%; ▌Ole F. Swanjord (Farmer–Labor) 39.5%
Minnesota 3	Charles Russell Davis	Republican	1902	Incumbent lost renomination. Republican hold.	▌ ✓ August H. Andresen (Republican) 57.3%; ▌Anthony C. Welch (Farmer–Labor) 42.7%
Minnesota 4	Oscar Keller	Republican	1918	Incumbent re-elected.	▌ ✓ Oscar Keller (Republican) 47.7%; ▌Daniel W. Lawler (Democratic) 36.8%; ▌Julius F. Emme (Farmer–Labor) 15.4%
Minnesota 5	Walter Newton	Republican	1918	Incumbent re-elected.	▌ ✓ Walter Newton (Republican) 58.9%; ▌Albert G. Bastis (Farmer–Labor) 31.7%; ▌John S. Crosby (Democratic) 9.4%
Minnesota 6	Harold Knutson	Republican	1916	Incumbent re-elected.	▌ ✓ Harold Knutson (Republican) 54.1%; ▌Sam C. Shipstead (Farmer–Labor) 45.9%
Minnesota 7	Ole J. Kvale	Farmer–Labor	1922	Incumbent re-elected.	▌ ✓ Ole J. Kvale (Farmer–Labor) 58.5%; ▌Gunnar B. Bjornson (Republican) 41.5%
Minnesota 8	Oscar Larson	Republican	1920	Incumbent retired. Farmer–Labor gain.	▌ ✓ William L. Carss (Farmer–Labor) 54.3%; ▌Victor L. Power (Republican) 45.7%
Minnesota 9	Knud Wefald	Farmer–Labor	1922	Incumbent re-elected.	▌ ✓ Knud Wefald (Farmer–Labor) 56.8%; ▌Frank H. Peterson (Republican) 43.2%
Minnesota 10	Thomas D. Schall	Republican	1914	Incumbent retired to run for U.S. senator. Republican hold.	▌ ✓ Godfrey G. Goodwin (Republican) 53.8%; ▌George D. Brewer (Farmer–Labor) 41.1%; ▌Frank Hicks (Democratic) 5.1%

== Mississippi ==
District	Incumbent			This race	
District	Representative	Party	First elected	Results	Candidates
Mississippi 1	John E. Rankin	Democratic	1920	Incumbent re-elected.	▌ ✓ John E. Rankin (Democratic); Uncontested
Mississippi 2	Bill G. Lowrey	Democratic	1920	Incumbent re-elected.	▌ ✓ Bill G. Lowrey (Democratic); Uncontested
Mississippi 3	William Y. Humphreys	Democratic	1923 (special)	Incumbent retired. Democratic hold.	▌ ✓ William Madison Whittington (Democratic); Uncontested
Mississippi 4	T. Jeff Busby	Democratic	1922	Incumbent re-elected.	▌ ✓ T. Jeff Busby (Democratic) 95.7%; ▌R. H. DeKay (Republican) 4.3%
Mississippi 5	Ross A. Collins	Democratic	1920	Incumbent re-elected.	▌ ✓ Ross A. Collins (Democratic); Uncontested
Mississippi 6	T. Webber Wilson	Democratic	1922	Incumbent re-elected.	▌ ✓ T. Webber Wilson (Democratic); Uncontested
Mississippi 7	Percy Quin	Democratic	1912	Incumbent re-elected.	▌ ✓ Percy Quin (Democratic); Uncontested
Mississippi 8	James W. Collier	Democratic	1908	Incumbent re-elected.	▌ ✓ James W. Collier (Democratic); Uncontested

== Missouri ==
District	Incumbent			This race	
District	Representative	Party	First elected	Results	Candidates
Missouri 1	Milton A. Romjue	Democratic	1922	Incumbent re-elected.	▌ ✓ Milton A. Romjue (Democratic) 57.3%; ▌Frank C. Millspaugh (Republican) 42.7%
Missouri 2	Ralph F. Lozier	Democratic	1922	Incumbent re-elected.	▌ ✓ Ralph F. Lozier (Democratic) 62.8%; ▌W. R. Sweeney (Republican) 36.5%; ▌Elias P. Anderson (Socialist) 0.8%
Missouri 3	Jacob L. Milligan	Democratic	1922	Incumbent re-elected.	▌ ✓ Jacob L. Milligan (Democratic) 52.8%; ▌Henry F. Lawrence (Republican) 47.2%
Missouri 4	Charles L. Faust	Republican	1920	Incumbent re-elected.	▌ ✓ Charles L. Faust (Republican) 51.3%; ▌John McDaniel (Democratic) 48.7%
Missouri 5	Henry L. Jost	Democratic	1922	Incumbent retired. Republican gain.	▌ ✓ Edgar C. Ellis (Republican) 49.8%; ▌George H. Combs Jr. (Democratic) 48.9%; ▌Joseph G. Hodges (Socialist) 1.3%
Missouri 6	Clement C. Dickinson	Democratic	1922	Incumbent re-elected.	▌ ✓ Clement C. Dickinson (Democratic) 53.8%; ▌William O. Atkeson (Republican) 46.2%
Missouri 7	Samuel C. Major	Democratic	1922	Incumbent re-elected.	▌ ✓ Samuel C. Major (Democratic) 52.0%; ▌O. B. Whitaker (Republican) 48.0%
Missouri 8	Sidney C. Roach	Republican	1920	Incumbent lost re-election. Democratic gain.	▌ ✓ William L. Nelson (Democratic) 50.8%; ▌Sidney C. Roach (Republican) 49.2%
Missouri 9	Clarence Cannon	Democratic	1922	Incumbent re-elected.	▌ ✓ Clarence Cannon (Democratic) 56.1%; ▌George E. Hackmann (Republican) 43.3%; ▌Harry Shumaker (Socialist) 0.5%
Missouri 10	Cleveland A. Newton	Republican	1918	Incumbent re-elected.	▌ ✓ Cleveland A. Newton (Republican) 61.2%; ▌Henry J. Schleper (Democratic) 35.3%; ▌G. A. Hoehn (Socialist) 3.4%; ▌[FNU] Morishe (Socialist Labor) 0.1%
Missouri 11	Harry B. Hawes	Democratic	1920	Incumbent re-elected.	▌ ✓ Harry B. Hawes (Democratic) 50.6%; ▌Michael J. Hart (Republican) 47.5%; Others: ▌E. J. Tschudin (Socialist) 1.9%; ▌[FNU] Anastosoff (Socialist Labor) 0.1%
Missouri 12	Leonidas C. Dyer	Republican	1914	Incumbent re-elected.	▌ ✓ Leonidas C. Dyer (Republican) 63.2%; ▌Jerome F. Duggan (Democratic) 34.4%; ▌Henry Siroky (Socialist) 2.3%; ▌Charles Kuchan (Socialist Labor) 0.1%
Missouri 13	J. Scott Wolff	Democratic	1922	Incumbent lost re-election. Republican gain.	▌ ✓ Charles E. Kiefner (Republican) 53.0%; ▌J. Scott Wolff (Democratic) 47.0%
Missouri 14	James F. Fulbright	Democratic	1922	Incumbent lost re-election. Republican gain.	▌ ✓ Ralph E. Bailey (Republican) 50.3%; ▌James F. Fulbright (Democratic) 49.7%
Missouri 15	Joe J. Manlove	Republican	1922	Incumbent re-elected.	▌ ✓ Joe J. Manlove (Republican) 56.4%; ▌William G. Warner (Democratic) 43.3%; ▌[FNU] Stater (Socialist) 0.2%
Missouri 16	Thomas L. Rubey	Democratic	1922	Incumbent re-elected.	▌ ✓ Thomas L. Rubey (Democratic) 55.8%; ▌William P. Elmer (Republican) 44.2%

== Montana ==
District	Incumbent			This race	
District	Representative	Party	First elected	Results	Candidates
Montana 1	John M. Evans	Democratic	1922	Incumbent re-elected.	▌ ✓ John M. Evans (Democratic) 63.9%; ▌John O. Daveis (Republican) 34.8%; ▌John F. McKay (Socialist) 1.3%
Montana 2	Scott Leavitt	Republican	1922	Incumbent re-elected.	▌ ✓ Scott Leavitt (Republican) 61.4%; ▌Joseph Kirschwing (Democratic) 32.0%; ▌Charles E. Taylor (Farmer–Labor) 6.6%

== Nebraska ==
District	Incumbent			This race	
District	Representative	Party	First elected	Results	Candidates
Nebraska 1	John H. Morehead	Democratic	1922	Incumbent re-elected.	▌ ✓ John H. Morehead (Democratic) 51.8%; ▌Roy H. Thorpe (Republican) 45.9%; ▌E. Luella Barton (Prohibition) 2.4%
Nebraska 2	Willis G. Sears	Republican	1922	Incumbent re-elected.	▌ ✓ Willis G. Sears (Republican) 55.5%; ▌William N. Jamieson (Democratic) 35.8%; ▌Roy M. Harrop (Progressive) 8.8%
Nebraska 3	Edgar Howard	Democratic	1922	Incumbent re-elected.	▌ ✓ Edgar Howard (Democratic) 57.4%; ▌E. C. Houston (Republican) 42.6%
Nebraska 4	Melvin O. McLaughlin	Republican	1918	Incumbent re-elected.	▌ ✓ Melvin O. McLaughlin (Republican) 49.0%; ▌E. E. Placek (Democratic) 44.0%; ▌John A. Schmidt (Progressive) 6.9%
Nebraska 5	Ashton C. Shallenberger	Democratic	1922	Incumbent re-elected.	▌ ✓ Ashton C. Shallenberger (Democratic) 55.8%; ▌William E. Andrews (Republican) 44.2%
Nebraska 6	Robert G. Simmons	Republican	1922	Incumbent re-elected.	▌ ✓ Robert G. Simmons (Republican) 59.9%; ▌Charles W. Beal (Democratic) 34.2%; ▌Jesse Gandy (Progressive) 5.9%

== Nevada ==
District	Incumbent			This race	
District	Representative	Party	First elected	Results	Candidates
Nevada at-large	Charles L. Richards	Democratic	1922	Incumbent lost re-election. Republican gain.	▌ ✓ Samuel S. Arentz (Republican) 50.4%; ▌Charles L. Richards (Democratic) 49.6%

== New Hampshire ==
District	Incumbent			This race	
District	Representative	Party	First elected	Results	Candidates
New Hampshire 1	William N. Rogers	Democratic	1922	Incumbent lost re-election. Republican gain.	▌ ✓ Fletcher Hale (Republican) 55.2%; ▌William N. Rogers (Democratic) 44.8%
New Hampshire 2	Edward Hills Wason	Republican	1914	Incumbent re-elected.	▌ ✓ Edward Hills Wason (Republican) 61.4%; ▌William H. Barry (Democratic) 38.6%

== New Jersey ==
District	Incumbent			This race	
District	Representative	Party	First elected	Results	Candidates
New Jersey 1	Francis F. Patterson Jr.	Republican	1920	Incumbent re-elected.	▌ ✓ Francis F. Patterson Jr. (Republican) 69.1%; ▌Robert A. Irving (Democratic) 27.0%; ▌Leo W. Harkins (Progressive) 3.9%
New Jersey 2	Isaac Bacharach	Republican	1914	Incumbent re-elected.	▌ ✓ Isaac Bacharach (Republican) 76.2%; ▌Charles S. Stevens (Democratic) 23.8%
New Jersey 3	Elmer H. Geran	Democratic	1922	Incumbent lost re-election. Republican gain.	▌ ✓ T. Frank Appleby (Republican) 60.3%; ▌Elmer H. Geran (Democratic) 39.7%
New Jersey 4	Charles Browne	Democratic	1922	Incumbent lost re-election. Republican gain.	▌ ✓ Charles A. Eaton (Republican) 53.8%; ▌Charles Browne (Democratic) 46.2%
New Jersey 5	Ernest R. Ackerman	Republican	1918	Incumbent re-elected.	▌ ✓ Ernest R. Ackerman (Republican) 72.3%; ▌Monell Sayre (Democratic) 27.7%
New Jersey 6	Randolph Perkins	Republican	1920	Incumbent re-elected.	▌ ✓ Randolph Perkins (Republican) 66.3%; ▌Alfred T. Holley (Democratic) 30.8%; ▌Frederick Krafft (Progressive) 2.8%
New Jersey 7	George N. Seger	Republican	1922	Incumbent re-elected.	▌ ✓ George N. Seger (Republican) 73.0%; ▌Andrew J. Callahan (Democratic) 21.8%; ▌Frank Hubschmitt (Socialist) 4.8%; ▌Harry Santhouse (Socialist Labor) 0.3%
New Jersey 8	Frank J. McNulty	Democratic	1922	Incumbent lost re-election. Republican gain.	▌ ✓ Herbert W. Taylor (Republican) 57.0%; ▌Frank J. McNulty (Democratic) 43.0%
New Jersey 9	Daniel F. Minahan	Democratic	1922	Incumbent lost re-election. Republican gain.	▌ ✓ Franklin W. Fort (Republican) 59.3%; ▌Daniel F. Minahan (Democratic) 36.7%; ▌Max Frenchman (Progressive) 4.0%
New Jersey 10	Frederick R. Lehlbach	Republican	1914	Incumbent re-elected.	▌ ✓ Frederick R. Lehlbach (Republican) 70.1%; ▌Moses Greenwood (Democratic) 25.6%; ▌Peter Pollack (Progressive) 4.3%
New Jersey 11	John J. Eagan	Democratic	1922	Incumbent lost renomination. Democratic hold.	▌ ✓ Oscar L. Auf der Heide (Democratic) 60.5%; ▌John F. Gardner (Republican) 35.3%; ▌William K. Tallman (Socialist) 3.8%; ▌Francis Steiner (Workers) 0.4%
New Jersey 12	Charles F. X. O'Brien	Democratic	1920	Incumbent retired. Democratic hold.	▌ ✓ Mary Teresa Norton (Democratic) 61.7%; ▌Douglas D. T. Story (Republican) 36.3%; Others: ▌Albert Sidler (Independent) 1.6%; ▌Robert Ambry (War Veterans) 0.2%; ▌Christian B. Blohm (Workers) 0.2%

== New Mexico ==
District	Incumbent			This race	
District	Representative	Party	First elected	Results	Candidates
New Mexico at-large	John Morrow	Democratic	1922	Incumbent re-elected.	▌ ✓ John Morrow (Democratic) 51.8%; ▌J. Felipe Hubbell (Republican) 48.2%

== New York ==
District	Incumbent			This race	
District	Representative	Party	First elected	Results	Candidates
New York 1	Robert L. Bacon	Republican	1922	Incumbent re-elected.	▌ ✓ Robert L. Bacon (Republican) 67.1%; ▌Ira L. Terry (Democratic) 30.5%; ▌May Harris Mainland (Socialist) 2.3%
New York 2	John J. Kindred	Democratic	1920	Incumbent re-elected.	▌ ✓ John J. Kindred (Democratic) 62.6%; ▌Frank E. Hopkins (Republican) 34.4%; ▌Barnet Wolff (Socialist) 3.0%
New York 3	George W. Lindsay	Democratic	1922	Incumbent re-elected.	▌ ✓ George W. Lindsay (Democratic) 64.8%; ▌Herman E. Sprigade (Republican) 28.1%; ▌Joseph A. Weil (Socialist) 7.1%
New York 4	Thomas H. Cullen	Democratic	1918	Incumbent re-elected.	▌ ✓ Thomas H. Cullen (Democratic) 73.9%; ▌Joseph Rosenbaum (Republican) 24.0%; ▌Marx Lewis (Socialist) 2.1%
New York 5	Loring M. Black Jr.	Democratic	1922	Incumbent re-elected.	▌ ✓ Loring M. Black Jr. (Democratic) 51.1%; ▌William T. Simpson (Republican) 46.6%; Others: ▌Francis M. Testa (Socialist) 2.0%; ▌Clyde W. Carter (Independent) 0.4%
New York 6	Charles I. Stengle	Democratic	1922	Incumbent retired. Democratic hold.	▌ ✓ Andrew Lawrence Somers (Democratic) 47.8%; ▌Warren I. Lee (Republican) 45.8%; ▌William W. Passage (Socialist) 6.4%
New York 7	John F. Quayle	Democratic	1922	Incumbent re-elected.	▌ ✓ John F. Quayle (Democratic) 56.7%; ▌Otis S. Carroll (Republican) 34.5%; ▌Jacob Axelrad (Socialist) 8.8%
New York 8	William E. Cleary	Democratic	1922	Incumbent re-elected.	▌ ✓ William E. Cleary (Democratic) 51.3%; ▌Max Perlman (Republican) 40.1%; ▌William M. Feigenbaum (Socialist) 8.6%
New York 9	David J. O'Connell	Democratic	1922	Incumbent re-elected.	▌ ✓ David J. O'Connell (Democratic) 50.2%; ▌Andrew Petersen (Republican) 44.5%; ▌Wilhemus B. Robinson (Socialist) 5.3%
New York 10	Emanuel Celler	Democratic	1922	Incumbent re-elected.	▌ ✓ Emanuel Celler (Democratic) 50.0%; ▌James N. Little (Republican) 38.5%; ▌Joseph A. Whitehorn (Socialist) 10.8%; ▌Alex Trachtenberg (Workers) 0.6%
New York 11	Anning S. Prall	Democratic	1923 (special)	Incumbent re-elected.	▌ ✓ Anning S. Prall (Democratic) 68.6%; ▌Frederick W. Lahr (Republican) 30.0%; ▌Magnus Jacobson (Socialist) 1.3%
New York 12	Samuel Dickstein	Democratic	1922	Incumbent re-elected.	▌ ✓ Samuel Dickstein (Democratic) 75.8%; ▌Harry Schlissel (Republican) 12.5%; ▌Israel Feinberg (Socialist) 10.9%; ▌Harry Winitsky (Workers) 0.8%
New York 13	Christopher D. Sullivan	Democratic	1916	Incumbent re-elected.	▌ ✓ Christopher D. Sullivan (Democratic) 71.1%; ▌Murray Firstman (Republican) 20.6%; ▌Julius Hochman (Socialist) 8.3%
New York 14	Nathan D. Perlman	Republican	1920	Incumbent re-elected.	▌ ✓ Nathan D. Perlman (Republican) 44.0%; ▌William Irving Sirovich (Democratic) 43.6%; ▌William Karlin (Socialist) 11.6%; ▌Ludwig Lore (Workers) 0.8%
New York 15	John J. Boylan	Democratic	1922	Incumbent re-elected.	▌ ✓ John J. Boylan (Democratic) 77.0%; ▌Warren Bigelow (Republican) 21.2%; ▌Leonard Kaye (Socialist) 1.9%
New York 16	John J. O'Connor	Democratic	1923 (special)	Incumbent re-elected.	▌ ✓ John J. O'Connor (Democratic) 72.3%; ▌L. Wilfred Nidt (Republican) 24.4%; ▌Bertha Mailly (Socialist) 3.3%
New York 17	Ogden L. Mills	Republican	1920	Incumbent re-elected.	▌ ✓ Ogden L. Mills (Republican) 57.0%; ▌Charles E. Gehring (Democratic) 40.7%; ▌Jessie Wallace Hughan (Socialist) 2.2%
New York 18	John F. Carew	Democratic	1912	Incumbent re-elected.	▌ ✓ John F. Carew (Democratic) 66.1%; ▌Charles W. Ferry (Republican) 27.4%; ▌Samuel E. Beardsley (Socialist) 6.4%
New York 19	Sol Bloom	Democratic	1923 (special)	Incumbent re-elected.	▌ ✓ Sol Bloom (Democratic) 54.5%; ▌Walter M. Chandler (Republican) 42.5%; ▌Lucille E. Randolph (Socialist) 3.0%
New York 20	Fiorello La Guardia	Republican	1922	Incumbent re-elected as a Socialist. Socialist gain. (Note: Fiorello H. La Guardia ran under both the Socialist and Progressive parties nominations)	▌ ✓ Fiorello La Guardia (Socialist/Prog.) 42.7%; ▌Henry Frank (Democratic) 28.4%; ▌Isaac Siegel (Republican) 28.2%; ▌Juliet Stuart Poyntz (Workers) 0.8%
New York 21	Royal H. Weller	Democratic	1922	Incumbent re-elected.	▌ ✓ Royal H. Weller (Democratic) 52.5%; ▌Charles H. Roberts (Republican) 43.0%; ▌A. Philip Randolph (Socialist) 2.8%; Others: ▌Oscar J. Smith (Independent) 1.4%; ▌Morris Van Veen (Commonwealth Land) 0.2%
New York 22	Anthony J. Griffin	Democratic	1918	Incumbent re-elected.	▌ ✓ Anthony J. Griffin (Democratic) 69.7%; ▌William E. Devlin (Republican) 23.3%; ▌Joseph B. Hagerty (Socialist) 7.0%
New York 23	Frank Oliver	Democratic	1922	Incumbent re-elected.	▌ ✓ Frank Oliver (Democratic) 56.3%; ▌Albert B. Rossdale (Republican) 29.7%; ▌August Claessens (Socialist) 13.1%; ▌H. M. Wicks (Workers) 0.9%
New York 24	Benjamin L. Fairchild	Republican	1923 (special)	Incumbent re-elected.	▌ ✓ Benjamin L. Fairchild (Republican) 45.5%; ▌John J. Kinney (Democratic) 44.7%; ▌Philip Umstadter (Socialist) 9.8%
New York 25	J. Mayhew Wainwright	Republican	1922	Incumbent re-elected.	▌ ✓ J. Mayhew Wainwright (Republican) 64.8%; ▌A. Outram Sherman (Democratic) 30.3%; ▌John Hagerty (Socialist) 4.9%
New York 26	Hamilton Fish Jr.	Republican	1920	Incumbent re-elected.	▌ ✓ Hamilton Fish Jr. (Republican) 69.7%; ▌Rosslyn M. Cox (Democratic) 27.2%; ▌James C. Hogan (Socialist) 3.1%
New York 27	Charles B. Ward	Republican	1914	Incumbent retired. Republican hold.	▌ ✓ Harcourt J. Pratt (Republican) 58.6%; ▌William C. DeWitt (Democratic) 39.4%; ▌Boris Fogelson (Socialist) 2.0%
New York 28	Parker Corning	Democratic	1922	Incumbent re-elected.	▌ ✓ Parker Corning (Democratic) 52.7%; ▌Charles H. Johnson (Republican) 46.2%; ▌Charles C. Sheahan (Socialist) 1.1%
New York 29	James S. Parker	Republican	1912	Incumbent re-elected.	▌ ✓ James S. Parker (Republican) 67.2%; ▌James E. Dwyer (Democratic) 31.1%; ▌T. J. Sullivan (Socialist) 1.7%
New York 30	Frank Crowther	Republican	1918	Incumbent re-elected.	▌ ✓ Frank Crowther (Republican) 62.9%; ▌James P. Boyle (Democratic) 33.2%; ▌Charles W. Noonan (Socialist) 4.0%
New York 31	Bertrand Snell	Republican	1915 (special)	Incumbent re-elected.	▌ ✓ Bertrand Snell (Republican) 70.5%; ▌John M. Cantwell (Democratic) 29.5%
New York 32	Thaddeus C. Sweet	Republican	1923 (special)	Incumbent re-elected.	▌ ✓ Thaddeus C. Sweet (Republican) 68.9%; ▌Charles R. Lee (Democratic) 31.1%
New York 33	Homer P. Snyder	Republican	1914	Incumbent retired. Republican hold.	▌ ✓ Frederick M. Davenport (Republican) 58.1%; ▌Albert R. Kessinger (Democratic) 39.5%; ▌Otto L. Endres (Socialist) 2.4%
New York 34	John D. Clarke	Republican	1920	Incumbent lost renomination. Republican hold.	▌ ✓ Harold S. Tolley (Republican) 69.7%; ▌Charles R. Seymour (Democratic) 28.1%; ▌William M. Boyd (Socialist) 2.2%
New York 35	Walter W. Magee	Republican	1914	Incumbent re-elected.	▌ ✓ Walter W. Magee (Republican) 64.7%; ▌John J. Kesel (Democratic) 32.2%; ▌Frank Heck (Socialist) 3.1%
New York 36	John Taber	Republican	1922	Incumbent re-elected.	▌ ✓ John Taber (Republican) 71.7%; ▌Michael J. Maney (Democratic) 28.3%
New York 37	Gale H. Stalker	Republican	1922	Incumbent re-elected.	▌ ✓ Gale H. Stalker (Republican) 66.9%; ▌Charles L. Durham (Democratic) 31.2%; ▌Daniel D. Hungerford (Socialist) 1.9%
New York 38	Meyer Jacobstein	Democratic	1922	Incumbent re-elected.	▌ ✓ Meyer Jacobstein (Democratic) 65.4%; ▌John J. McInerney (Republican) 34.6%
New York 39	Archie D. Sanders	Republican	1916	Incumbent re-elected.	▌ ✓ Archie D. Sanders (Republican) 67.9%; ▌Michael L. Coleman (Democratic) 27.7%; ▌George Weber (Socialist) 4.4%
New York 40	S. Wallace Dempsey	Republican	1914	Incumbent re-elected.	▌ ✓ S. Wallace Dempsey (Republican) 67.8%; ▌Thurman W. Stoner (Democratic) 26.7%; ▌Eustace Reynolds (Socialist) 5.5%
New York 41	Clarence MacGregor	Republican	1918	Incumbent re-elected.	▌ ✓ Clarence MacGregor (Republican) 68.1%; ▌Edward C. Dethloff (Democratic) 23.1%; ▌Frank Ehrenfried (Socialist) 8.8%
New York 42	James M. Mead	Democratic	1918	Incumbent re-elected.	▌ ✓ James M. Mead (Democratic) 50.1%; ▌Richard S. Parsons (Republican) 44.9%; ▌Amy R. Juengling (Socialist) 4.9%
New York 43	Daniel A. Reed	Republican	1918	Incumbent re-elected.	▌ ✓ Daniel A. Reed (Republican) 91.0%; ▌J. Samuel Fowler (Progressive) 9.0%

== North Carolina ==
District	Incumbent			This race	
District	Representative	Party	First elected	Results	Candidates
North Carolina 1	Hallett Sydney Ward	Democratic	1920	Incumbent retired. Democratic hold.	▌ ✓ Lindsay C. Warren (Democratic) 78.5%; ▌Peter D. Burgess (Republican) 21.5%
North Carolina 2	John H. Kerr	Democratic	1923 (special)	Incumbent re-elected.	▌ ✓ John H. Kerr (Democratic) 93.3%; ▌M. R. Vick (Republican) 6.7%
North Carolina 3	Charles L. Abernethy	Democratic	1922	Incumbent re-elected.	▌ ✓ Charles L. Abernethy (Democratic) 67.7%; ▌William H. Fisher (Republican) 32.3%
North Carolina 4	Edward W. Pou	Democratic	1900	Incumbent re-elected.	▌ ✓ Edward W. Pou (Democratic) 69.6%; ▌Y. Z. Parker (Republican) 30.4%
North Carolina 5	Charles Manly Stedman	Democratic	1910	Incumbent re-elected.	▌ ✓ Charles Manly Stedman (Democratic) 59.3%; ▌Thomas C. Carter (Republican) 40.7%
North Carolina 6	Homer L. Lyon	Democratic	1920	Incumbent re-elected.	▌ ✓ Homer L. Lyon (Democratic) 72.7%; ▌William J. McDonald (Republican) 27.3%
North Carolina 7	William C. Hammer	Democratic	1920	Incumbent re-elected.	▌ ✓ William C. Hammer (Democratic) 55.2%; ▌S. Carter Williams (Republican) 44.8%
North Carolina 8	Robert L. Doughton	Democratic	1910	Incumbent re-elected.	▌ ✓ Robert L. Doughton (Democratic) 56.5%; ▌James D. Dorsett (Republican) 43.5%
North Carolina 9	Alfred L. Bulwinkle	Democratic	1920	Incumbent re-elected.	▌ ✓ Alfred L. Bulwinkle (Democratic) 57.7%; ▌John A. Hendricks (Republican) 42.3%
North Carolina 10	Zebulon Weaver	Democratic	1916	Incumbent re-elected.	▌ ✓ Zebulon Weaver (Democratic) 55.5%; ▌Lewis P. Hamlin (Republican) 44.5%

== North Dakota ==
District	Incumbent			This race	
District	Representative	Party	First elected	Results	Candidates
North Dakota 1	Olger B. Burtness	Republican	1920	Incumbent re-elected.	▌ ✓ Olger B. Burtness (Republican) 75.5%; ▌Walter Welford (Democratic) 24.5%
North Dakota 2	George M. Young	Republican	1912	Incumbent resigned September 2, 1924. Republican hold.	▌ ✓ Thomas Hall (Republican) 42.3%; ▌Gerald Nye (Democratic) 38.0%; ▌M. C. Freercks (Nonpartisan League) 19.7%
North Dakota 3	James H. Sinclair	Republican	1918	Incumbent re-elected.	▌ ✓ James H. Sinclair (Republican) 73.4%; ▌R. A. Johnson (Democratic) 26.6%

== Ohio ==
District	Incumbent			This race	
District	Representative	Party	First elected	Results	Candidates
Ohio 1	Nicholas Longworth	Republican	1914	Incumbent re-elected.	▌ ✓ Nicholas Longworth (Republican) 61.7%; ▌Thomas B. Paxton (Democratic) 38.3%
Ohio 2	Ambrose E. B. Stephens	Republican	1918	Incumbent re-elected.	▌ ✓ Ambrose E. B. Stephens (Republican) 58.1%; ▌Robert J. O'Donnell (Democratic) 41.9%
Ohio 3	Roy G. Fitzgerald	Republican	1920	Incumbent re-elected.	▌ ✓ Roy G. Fitzgerald (Republican) 62.3%; ▌John P. Rogers (Democratic) 36.8%; ▌Joseph Woodward (Socialist) 0.9%
Ohio 4	John L. Cable	Republican	1920	Incumbent retired. Republican hold.	▌ ✓ William T. Fitzgerald (Republican) 50.8%; ▌Hugh T. Mathers (Democratic) 49.2%
Ohio 5	Charles J. Thompson	Republican	1918	Incumbent re-elected.	▌ ✓ Charles J. Thompson (Republican) 51.5%; ▌Frank C. Kniffin (Democratic) 48.5%
Ohio 6	Charles C. Kearns	Republican	1914	Incumbent re-elected.	▌ ✓ Charles C. Kearns (Republican) 53.0%; ▌Edward N. Kennedy (Democratic) 47.0%
Ohio 7	Charles Brand	Republican	1922	Incumbent re-elected.	▌ ✓ Charles Brand (Republican) 63.9%; ▌C. K. Wolf (Democratic) 36.1%
Ohio 8	R. Clint Cole	Republican	1918	Incumbent lost re-election. Democratic gain.	▌ ✓ Thomas B. Fletcher (Democratic) 53.2%; ▌R. Clint Cole (Republican) 46.0%; ▌Charles E. Lukens (Independent) 0.8%
Ohio 9	Isaac R. Sherwood	Democratic	1922	Incumbent lost re-election. Republican gain.	▌ ✓ William W. Chalmers (Republican) 51.6%; ▌Isaac R. Sherwood (Democratic) 45.7%; Others: ▌Millard Price (Prohibition) 2.0%; ▌John Kocinski (Independent) 0.7%
Ohio 10	Israel M. Foster	Republican	1918	Incumbent lost renomination. Republican hold.	▌ ✓ Thomas A. Jenkins (Republican) 64.5%; ▌W. F. Rutherford (Democratic) 35.5%
Ohio 11	Mell G. Underwood	Democratic	1922	Incumbent re-elected.	▌ ✓ Mell G. Underwood (Democratic) 59.5%; ▌Edwin D. Ricketts (Republican) 40.5%
Ohio 12	John C. Speaks	Republican	1920	Incumbent re-elected.	▌ ✓ John C. Speaks (Republican) 58.7%; ▌Lowry F. Sater (Democratic) 41.3%
Ohio 13	James T. Begg	Republican	1918	Incumbent re-elected.	▌ ✓ James T. Begg (Republican) 62.1%; ▌John Dreitzler (Democratic) 37.9%
Ohio 14	Martin L. Davey	Democratic	1922	Incumbent re-elected.	▌ ✓ Martin L. Davey (Democratic) 50.8%; ▌Arthur W. Doyle (Republican) 49.2%
Ohio 15	C. Ellis Moore	Republican	1918	Incumbent re-elected.	▌ ✓ C. Ellis Moore (Republican) 56.1%; ▌James R. Alexander (Democratic) 43.9%
Ohio 16	John McSweeney	Democratic	1922	Incumbent re-elected.	▌ ✓ John McSweeney (Democratic) 51.5%; ▌Thomas C. Hunsicker (Republican) 45.6%; ▌Jacob S. Coxey Sr. (Independent) 2.9%
Ohio 17	William M. Morgan	Republican	1920	Incumbent re-elected.	▌ ✓ William M. Morgan (Republican) 57.9%; ▌J. Freer Bittinger (Democratic) 42.1%
Ohio 18	B. Frank Murphy	Republican	1918	Incumbent re-elected.	▌ ✓ B. Frank Murphy (Republican) 66.3%; ▌James M. Barton (Democratic) 31.4%; ▌Charles Coleman (Independent) 2.3%
Ohio 19	John G. Cooper	Republican	1914	Incumbent re-elected.	▌ ✓ John G. Cooper (Republican) 75.5%; ▌Phebe T. Sutliff (Democratic) 24.5%
Ohio 20	Charles A. Mooney	Democratic	1922	Incumbent re-elected.	▌ ✓ Charles A. Mooney (Democratic) 59.7%; ▌Harvey Drucker (Republican) 39.3%; ▌C. E. Ruthenberg (Workers) 1.0%
Ohio 21	Robert Crosser	Democratic	1922	Incumbent re-elected.	▌ ✓ Robert Crosser (Democratic) 53.2%; ▌Harry C. Gahn (Republican) 46.2%; ▌John Brahtin (Workers) 0.6%
Ohio 22	Theodore E. Burton	Republican	1920	Incumbent re-elected.	▌ ✓ Theodore E. Burton (Republican) 61.8%; ▌Sam B. Fitzsimmons (Democratic) 21.4%; ▌Alfred F. Coyle (Independent) 16.6%; ▌A. V. Severino (Workers) 0.2%

== Oklahoma ==
District	Incumbent			This race	
District	Representative	Party	First elected	Results	Candidates
Oklahoma 1	Everette B. Howard	Democratic	1922	Incumbent retired to run for U.S. senator. Republican gain.	▌ ✓ Samuel J. Montgomery (Republican) 49.3%; ▌Wayne W. Bayless (Democratic) 49.2%; ▌Lee Williams (Farmer–Labor) 1.5%
Oklahoma 2	William W. Hastings	Democratic	1922	Incumbent re-elected.	▌ ✓ William W. Hastings (Democratic) 54.9%; ▌P. E. Reed (Republican) 44.2%; ▌C. D. Moore (Farmer–Labor) 0.9%
Oklahoma 3	Charles D. Carter	Democratic	1907 (new state)	Incumbent re-elected.	▌ ✓ Charles D. Carter (Democratic) 83.1%; ▌Don Welch (Republican) 14.5%; ▌R. L. Thurmond (Farmer–Labor) 2.5%
Oklahoma 4	Tom D. McKeown	Democratic	1922	Incumbent re-elected.	▌ ✓ Tom D. McKeown (Democratic) 58.8%; ▌Charles E. Wells (Republican) 37.6%; ▌M. L. Misenheimer (Farmer–Labor) 3.6%
Oklahoma 5	Fletcher B. Swank	Democratic	1920	Incumbent re-elected.	▌ ✓ Fletcher B. Swank (Democratic) 59.2%; ▌John Golobie (Republican) 38.2%; ▌John Framing (Farmer–Labor) 2.6%
Oklahoma 6	Elmer Thomas	Democratic	1922	Incumbent re-elected.	▌ ✓ Elmer Thomas (Democratic) 54.8%; ▌L. M. Gensman (Republican) 41.1%; ▌J. N. Carter (Farmer–Labor) 4.2%
Oklahoma 7	James V. McClintic	Democratic	1914	Incumbent re-elected.	▌ ✓ James V. McClintic (Democratic) 65.7%; ▌Walter S. Mills (Republican) 26.5%; ▌Michael Shadid (Farmer–Labor) 7.8%
Oklahoma 8	Milton C. Garber	Republican	1922	Incumbent re-elected.	▌ ✓ Milton C. Garber (Republican) 51.2%; ▌V. P. Crowe (Democratic) 44.3%; ▌Alfred Reynolds (Farmer–Labor) 4.5%

== Oregon ==
District	Incumbent			This race	
District	Representative	Party	First elected	Results	Candidates
Oregon 1	Willis C. Hawley	Republican	1906	Incumbent re-elected.	▌ ✓ Willis C. Hawley (Republican) 63.5%; ▌Harvey L. Clark (Democratic) 22.0%; ▌W. J. Butler (Independent) 11.8%; ▌Upton A. Upton (Socialist Labor) 2.7%
Oregon 2	Nicholas J. Sinnott	Republican	1912	Incumbent re-elected.	▌ ✓ Nicholas J. Sinnott (Republican) 61.6%; ▌James H. Graham (Democratic) 38.4%
Oregon 3	Elton Watkins	Democratic	1922	Incumbent lost re-election. Republican gain.	▌ ✓ Maurice E. Crumpacker (Republican) 54.7%; ▌Elton Watkins (Democratic) 42.7%; ▌I. N. Johns (Socialist Labor) 2.6%

== Pennsylvania ==
District	Incumbent			This race	
District	Representative	Party	First elected	Results	Candidates
Pennsylvania 1	William S. Vare	Republican	1912	Incumbent re-elected.	▌ ✓ William S. Vare (Republican) 84.4%; ▌Joseph A. Robbins (Democratic) 10.4%; ▌Alfred E. Scott (Socialist) 4.7%; ▌J. A. Robbins (Progressive) 0.5%
Pennsylvania 2	George S. Graham	Republican	1912	Incumbent re-elected.	▌ ✓ George S. Graham (Republican) 82.7%; ▌Jessie L. Collet (Democratic) 14.0%; ▌Isadore Polstein (Socialist) 3.2%; ▌A. M Freg (Prohibition) 0.1%
Pennsylvania 3	Harry C. Ransley	Republican	1920	Incumbent re-elected.	▌ ✓ Harry C. Ransley (Republican) 83.9%; ▌Edward P. Carroll (Democratic) 8.8%; ▌Jennie Dornblum (Socialist Labor) 7.1%; Others: ▌L. Blankenburg (Prohibition) 0.2%; ▌William Mickle (Commonwealth Land) 0.0%
Pennsylvania 4	George W. Edmonds	Republican	1912	Incumbent lost renomination. Republican hold.	▌ ✓ Benjamin M. Golder (Republican) 77.8%; ▌Adolph Class (Democratic) 16.0%; ▌Henry P. Thomas (Socialist) 6.2%; ▌David S. Sobel (Commonwealth Land) 0.1%
Pennsylvania 5	James J. Connolly	Republican	1920	Incumbent re-elected.	▌ ✓ James J. Connolly (Republican) 81.0%; ▌Daniel J. O'Donnell (Democratic) 13.0%; ▌Henry Calse (Socialist) 5.4%; Others: ▌Joseph H. Robbins (Prohibition) 0.6%; ▌Raymond James (Commonwealth Land) 0.1%
Pennsylvania 6	George A. Welsh	Republican	1922	Incumbent re-elected.	▌ ✓ George A. Welsh (Republican) 74.6%; ▌Francis I. J. Coyle (Democratic) 19.6%; ▌Edward Norton (Socialist) 4.4%; Others: ▌James R. Patten (Prohibition) 0.6%; ▌F. R. Mason (Independent) 0.6%; ▌Frederick E. Mayer (Commonwealth Land) 0.1%
Pennsylvania 7	George P. Darrow	Republican	1914	Incumbent re-elected.	▌ ✓ George P. Darrow (Republican) 80.7%; ▌Thomas A. O'Hara (Democratic) 14.4%; ▌John Held (Socialist) 4.7%; ▌Oliver Wingert (Commonwealth Land) 0.2%
Pennsylvania 8	Thomas S. Butler	Republican	1896	Incumbent re-elected.	▌ ✓ Thomas S. Butler (Republican) 80.7%; ▌Gordon H. Cilley (Democratic) 16.3%; Others: ▌Walter Lodge (Socialist) 2.0%; ▌Frank G. Lewis (Prohibition) 1.0%; ▌Joseph H. Bruner (Commonwealth Land) 0.0%
Pennsylvania 9	Henry Winfield Watson	Republican	1914	Incumbent re-elected.	▌ ✓ Henry Winfield Watson (Republican) 72.5%; ▌C. William Freed (Democratic) 22.7%; ▌Anna Van Skite (Prohibition) 2.5%; ▌Elmer Young (Socialist) 2.3%; ▌Julian P. Hickok (Commonwealth Land) 0.1%
Pennsylvania 10	William W. Griest	Republican	1908	Incumbent re-elected.	▌ ✓ William W. Griest (Republican) 60.4%; ▌Frank C. Musser (Democratic) 38.6%; ▌Daisy M. Detterline (Labor) 1.0%
Pennsylvania 11	Laurence H. Watres	Republican	1922	Incumbent re-elected.	▌ ✓ Laurence H. Watres (Republican) 56.7%; ▌David Fowler (Democratic) 40.7%; ▌William P. Boland (Progressive) 2.2%; ▌William Repp (Prohibition) 0.3%
Pennsylvania 12	John J. Casey	Democratic	1922	Incumbent lost re-election. Republican gain.	▌ ✓ Edmund N. Carpenter (Republican) 55.6%; ▌John J. Casey (Democratic) 44.4%
Pennsylvania 13	George F. Brumm	Republican	1922	Incumbent re-elected.	▌ ✓ George F. Brumm (Republican) 69.5%; ▌Thomas J. Butler (Democratic) 28.4%; ▌U. Grant Mengel (Socialist) 2.1%
Pennsylvania 14	William M. Croll	Democratic	1922	Incumbent lost re-election. Republican gain.	▌ ✓ Charles J. Esterly (Republican) 50.5%; ▌William M. Croll (Democratic) 42.6%; ▌Raymond S. Hofses (Socialist) 6.9%
Pennsylvania 15	Louis T. McFadden	Republican	1914	Incumbent re-elected.	▌ ✓ Louis T. McFadden (Republican) 68.8%; ▌Charles M. Driggs (Democratic) 29.6%; ▌Julius W. Kiesel (Socialist) 1.7%
Pennsylvania 16	Edgar R. Kiess	Republican	1912	Incumbent re-elected.	▌ ✓ Edgar R. Kiess (Republican) 55.5%; ▌Thomas Wood (Democratic) 37.7%; ▌P. A. McGowan (Socialist Labor) 6.8%
Pennsylvania 17	Herbert W. Cummings	Democratic	1922	Incumbent lost re-election. Republican gain.	▌ ✓ Frederick W. Magrady (Republican) 53.5%; ▌Herbert W. Cummings (Democratic) 46.5%
Pennsylvania 18	Edward M. Beers	Republican	1922	Incumbent re-elected.	▌ ✓ Edward M. Beers (Republican) 66.2%; ▌Meredith Meyers (Democratic) 33.8%
Pennsylvania 19	Frank C. Sites	Democratic	1922	Incumbent lost re-election. Republican gain.	▌ ✓ Joshua W. Swartz (Republican) 53.8%; ▌Frank C. Sites (Democratic) 45.3%; ▌Sam Young (Socialist) 0.9%
Pennsylvania 20	George M. Wertz	Republican	1922	Incumbent lost renomination. Republican hold.	▌ ✓ Anderson H. Walters (Republican); ▌Warren Worth Bailey (Democratic)
Pennsylvania 21	J. Banks Kurtz	Republican	1922	Incumbent re-elected.	▌ ✓ J. Banks Kurtz (Republican) 69.4%; ▌Harry K. Filler (Democratic) 18.5%; ▌J. E. Miller (Labor) 12.1%
Pennsylvania 22	Samuel F. Glatfelter	Democratic	1922	Incumbent lost re-election. Republican gain.	▌ ✓ Franklin Menges (Republican) 53.4%; ▌Samuel F. Glatfelter (Democratic) 45.2%; ▌Henry W. Logeman (Socialist) 1.4%
Pennsylvania 23	William I. Swoope	Republican	1922	Incumbent re-elected.	▌ ✓ William I. Swoope (Republican) 64.7%; ▌Edward W. Benson (Democratic) 35.3%
Pennsylvania 24	Samuel A. Kendall	Republican	1918	Incumbent re-elected.	▌ ✓ Samuel A. Kendall (Republican) 68.5%; ▌Harrison N. Boyd (Democratic) 25.7%; ▌W. M. Likins (American) 3.5%; ▌E. H. Werner (Progressive) 2.3%
Pennsylvania 25	Henry W. Temple	Republican	1912	Incumbent re-elected.	▌ ✓ Henry W. Temple (Republican) 62.5%; ▌Grant Furlong (Democratic) 36.0%; ▌David P. Cushnie (Farmer–Labor) 1.5%
Pennsylvania 26	Thomas W. Phillips Jr.	Republican	1922	Incumbent re-elected.	▌ ✓ Thomas W. Phillips Jr. (Republican) 68.8%; ▌John G. Cobler (Democratic) 27.2%; ▌George Lewis (Socialist) 4.0%
Pennsylvania 27	Nathan L. Strong	Republican	1916	Incumbent re-elected.	▌ ✓ Nathan L. Strong (Republican) 58.9%; ▌John H. Murray (Prohibition) 19.8%; ▌Harry W. Fee (Democratic) 17.9%; ▌R. V. Johns (Socialist) 3.4%
Pennsylvania 28	Harris J. Bixler	Republican	1920	Incumbent re-elected.	▌ ✓ Harris J. Bixler (Republican) 79.1%; ▌William G. Barker (Democratic) 20.9%
Pennsylvania 29	Milton W. Shreve	Republican	1918	Incumbent re-elected.	▌ ✓ Milton W. Shreve (Republican) 57.7%; ▌Edward M. Murphy (Democratic) 21.6%; ▌Elizabeth R. Culbertson (Prohibition) 17.3%; ▌G. F. Burger (Socialist) 3.4%
Pennsylvania 30	Everett Kent	Democratic	1922	Incumbent lost re-election. Republican gain.	▌ ✓ William R. Coyle (Republican) 50.9%; ▌Everett Kent (Democratic) 47.1%; Others: ▌Wilson Brown (Socialist) 1.3%; ▌Benjamin E. Bender (Socialist) 0.8%
Pennsylvania 31	Adam Wyant	Republican	1920	Incumbent re-elected.	▌ ✓ Adam Wyant (Republican) 60.4%; ▌Chester D. Sensenich (Democratic) 39.6%
Pennsylvania 32	Stephen G. Porter	Republican	1910	Incumbent re-elected.	▌ ✓ Stephen G. Porter (Republican) 79.5%; ▌P. M. O'Donnell (Democratic) 12.9%; ▌Alfred Leach (Socialist) 3.5%; ▌Wayne Paulin (Progressive) 3.2%; ▌Anton Horvat (Workers) 0.8%
Pennsylvania 33	M. Clyde Kelly	Republican	1916	Incumbent re-elected.	▌ ✓ M. Clyde Kelly (Republican) 81.1%; ▌Gilbert F. Myer (Democratic) 13.1%; ▌William Adams (Socialist) 4.7%; ▌Otto Yeager (Workers) 1.1%
Pennsylvania 34	John M. Morin	Republican	1912	Incumbent re-elected.	▌ ✓ John M. Morin (Republican) 82.5%; ▌William N. McNair (Democratic) 12.0%; ▌Louis Finn (Socialist) 3.6%; Others: ▌M. H. Sheets (Prohibition) 1.3%; ▌Max Davidson (Workers) 0.6%
Pennsylvania 35	James M. Magee	Republican	1922	Incumbent re-elected.	▌ ✓ James M. Magee (Republican) 59.9%; ▌John W. Slayton (Socialist Labor) 19.1%; ▌John Murphy (Democratic) 12.1%; ▌Thomas P. Moran (Independent) 5.4%; ▌Frank H. Ellis (Prohibition) 3.5%
Pennsylvania 36	Guy E. Campbell	Republican	1916	Incumbent re-elected.	▌ ✓ Guy E. Campbell (Republican) 87.2%; ▌W. H. Bright (Prohibition) 12.8%

== Rhode Island ==
District	Incumbent			This race	
District	Representative	Party	First elected	Results	Candidates
Rhode Island 1	Clark Burdick	Republican	1918	Incumbent re-elected.	▌ ✓ Clark Burdick (Republican) 65.2%; ▌Alfred H. Jones (Democratic) 34.8%
Rhode Island 2	Richard S. Aldrich	Republican	1922	Incumbent re-elected.	▌ ✓ Richard S. Aldrich (Republican) 63.9%; ▌Charles M. Hall (Democratic) 36.1%
Rhode Island 3	Jeremiah E. O'Connell	Democratic	1922	Incumbent re-elected.	▌ ✓ Jeremiah E. O'Connell (Democratic) 51.7%; ▌Louis Monast (Republican) 48.3%

== South Carolina ==
District	Incumbent			This race	
District	Representative	Party	First elected	Results	Candidates
South Carolina 1	W. Turner Logan	Democratic	1920	Incumbent lost renomination. Democratic hold.	▌ ✓ Thomas S. McMillan (Democratic); Uncontested
South Carolina 2	James F. Byrnes	Democratic	1910	Incumbent retired to run for U.S. senator. Democratic hold.	▌ ✓ Butler B. Hare (Democratic); Uncontested
South Carolina 3	Frederick H. Dominick	Democratic	1916	Incumbent re-elected.	▌ ✓ Frederick H. Dominick (Democratic); Uncontested
South Carolina 4	John J. McSwain	Democratic	1920	Incumbent re-elected.	▌ ✓ John J. McSwain (Democratic); Uncontested
South Carolina 5	William Francis Stevenson	Democratic	1917 (special)	Incumbent re-elected.	▌ ✓ William Francis Stevenson (Democratic); Uncontested
South Carolina 6	Allard H. Gasque	Democratic	1922	Incumbent re-elected.	▌ ✓ Allard H. Gasque (Democratic); Uncontested
South Carolina 7	Hampton P. Fulmer	Democratic	1920	Incumbent re-elected.	▌ ✓ Hampton P. Fulmer (Democratic); Uncontested

== South Dakota ==
District	Incumbent			This race	
District	Representative	Party	First elected	Results	Candidates
South Dakota 1	Charles A. Christopherson	Republican	1918	Incumbent re-elected.	▌ ✓ Charles A. Christopherson (Republican) 53.5%; ▌Warren E. Beck (Democratic) 27.2%; ▌William Bartling (Independent) 9.9%; ▌William T. Jones (Independent) 9.4%
South Dakota 2	Royal C. Johnson	Republican	1914	Incumbent re-elected.	▌ ✓ Royal C. Johnson (Republican) 60.2%; ▌Walter P. Wohlheter (Independent) 15.4%; ▌Fred H. Hildebrandt (Independent) 13.5%; ▌Jack P. Reinhord (Democratic) 10.8%
South Dakota 3	William Williamson	Republican	1920	Incumbent re-elected.	▌ ✓ William Williamson (Republican) 58.3%; ▌John R. Russell (Democratic) 20.8%; ▌Arthur H. Atwood (Independent) 14.4%; ▌George H. Randall (Independent) 3.3%; ▌Charles Ash Bates (Independent) 3.2%

== Tennessee ==
District	Incumbent			This race	
District	Representative	Party	First elected	Results	Candidates
Tennessee 1	B. Carroll Reece	Republican	1920	Incumbent re-elected.	▌ ✓ B. Carroll Reece (Republican) 62.6%; ▌R. M. Barry (Democratic) 30.3%; ▌T. F. Robinson (Independent) 5.3%; ▌W. I. Giles (Independent) 1.9%
Tennessee 2	J. Will Taylor	Republican	1918	Incumbent re-elected.	▌ ✓ J. Will Taylor (Republican) 96.3%; ▌Mitchell Long (Democratic) 3.7%
Tennessee 3	Sam D. McReynolds	Democratic	1922	Incumbent re-elected.	▌ ✓ Sam D. McReynolds (Democratic) 56.8%; ▌May Giles Howard (Republican) 43.2%
Tennessee 4	Cordell Hull	Democratic	1922	Incumbent re-elected.	▌ ✓ Cordell Hull (Democratic); Uncontested
Tennessee 5	Ewin L. Davis	Democratic	1918	Incumbent re-elected.	▌ ✓ Ewin L. Davis (Democratic) 81.7%; ▌Abe Davidson (Republican) 18.3%
Tennessee 6	Jo Byrns	Democratic	1908	Incumbent re-elected.	▌ ✓ Jo Byrns (Democratic); Uncontested
Tennessee 7	William C. Salmon	Democratic	1922	Incumbent retired. Democratic hold.	▌ ✓ Edward E. Eslick (Democratic); Uncontested
Tennessee 8	Gordon Browning	Democratic	1922	Incumbent re-elected.	▌ ✓ Gordon Browning (Democratic); Uncontested
Tennessee 9	Finis J. Garrett	Democratic	1904	Incumbent re-elected.	▌ ✓ Finis J. Garrett (Democratic); Uncontested
Tennessee 10	Hubert Fisher	Democratic	1916	Incumbent re-elected.	▌ ✓ Hubert Fisher (Democratic) 74.0%; ▌George H. Poole (Independent) 13.3%; ▌Harry Spears (Republican) 12.7%

== Texas ==
District	Incumbent			This race	
District	Representative	Party	First elected	Results	Candidates
Texas 1	Eugene Black	Democratic	1914	Incumbent re-elected.	▌ ✓ Eugene Black (Democratic) 90.9%; ▌R. B. Johnson (Republican) 9.1%
Texas 2	John C. Box	Democratic	1918	Incumbent re-elected.	▌ ✓ John C. Box (Democratic) 89.9%; ▌A. E. Sweatland (Republican) 10.1%
Texas 3	Morgan G. Sanders	Democratic	1920	Incumbent re-elected.	▌ ✓ Morgan G. Sanders (Democratic); Uncontested
Texas 4	Sam Rayburn	Democratic	1912	Incumbent re-elected.	▌ ✓ Sam Rayburn (Democratic) 91.1%; ▌C. A. Gray (Republican) 8.9%
Texas 5	Hatton W. Sumners	Democratic	1914	Incumbent re-elected.	▌ ✓ Hatton W. Sumners (Democratic) 87.6%; ▌George S. Atkinson (Republican) 12.4%
Texas 6	Luther A. Johnson	Democratic	1922	Incumbent re-elected.	▌ ✓ Luther A. Johnson (Democratic) 93.1%; ▌Tyler Haswell (Republican) 6.9%
Texas 7	Clay Stone Briggs	Democratic	1918	Incumbent re-elected.	▌ ✓ Clay Stone Briggs (Democratic) 89.1%; ▌John T. Wheeler (Republican) 10.9%
Texas 8	Daniel E. Garrett	Democratic	1920	Incumbent re-elected.	▌ ✓ Daniel E. Garrett (Democratic) 86.0%; ▌Clarence A. Miller (Republican) 14.0%
Texas 9	Joseph J. Mansfield	Democratic	1916	Incumbent re-elected.	▌ ✓ Joseph J. Mansfield (Democratic) 82.3%; ▌Edward Franz (Republican) 17.7%
Texas 10	James P. Buchanan	Democratic	1912	Incumbent re-elected.	▌ ✓ James P. Buchanan (Democratic) 90.5%; ▌Otto Stolley (Republican) 9.5%
Texas 11	Tom Connally	Democratic	1916	Incumbent re-elected.	▌ ✓ Tom Connally (Democratic) 88.2%; ▌C. C. Baker (Republican) 11.8%
Texas 12	Fritz G. Lanham	Democratic	1919 (special)	Incumbent re-elected.	▌ ✓ Fritz G. Lanham (Democratic); Uncontested
Texas 13	Guinn Williams	Democratic	1922	Incumbent re-elected.	▌ ✓ Guinn Williams (Democratic) 88.6%; ▌C. W. Johnson Jr. (Republican) 11.4%
Texas 14	Harry M. Wurzbach	Republican	1920	Incumbent re-elected.	▌ ✓ Harry M. Wurzbach (Republican) 62.4%; ▌D. S. Davenport (Democratic) 37.6%
Texas 15	John Nance Garner	Democratic	1902	Incumbent re-elected.	▌ ✓ John Nance Garner (Democratic); Uncontested
Texas 16	Claude B. Hudspeth	Democratic	1918	Incumbent re-elected.	▌ ✓ Claude B. Hudspeth (Democratic) 84.1%; ▌Vernon L. Sullivan (Republican) 15.9%
Texas 17	Thomas L. Blanton	Democratic	1916	Incumbent re-elected.	▌ ✓ Thomas L. Blanton (Democratic); Uncontested
Texas 18	John Marvin Jones	Democratic	1916	Incumbent re-elected.	▌ ✓ John Marvin Jones (Democratic) 89.7%; ▌A. B. Spencer (Republican) 10.3%

== Utah ==
District	Incumbent			This race	
District	Representative	Party	First elected	Results	Candidates
Utah 1	Don B. Colton	Republican	1920	Incumbent re-elected.	▌ ✓ Don B. Colton (Republican) 54.9%; ▌Frank Francis (Democratic) 45.1%
Utah 2	Elmer O. Leatherwood	Republican	1920	Incumbent re-elected.	▌ ✓ Elmer O. Leatherwood (Republican) 56.7%; ▌James H. Waters (Democratic) 43.3%

== Vermont ==
District	Incumbent			This race	
District	Representative	Party	First elected	Results	Candidates
Vermont 1	Frederick G. Fleetwood	Republican	1922	Incumbent retired. Republican hold.	▌ ✓ Elbert S. Brigham (Republican) 52.1%; ▌Allan T. Calhoun (Democratic) 47.9%
Vermont 2	Ernest W. Gibson	Republican	1923 (special)	Incumbent re-elected.	▌ ✓ Ernest W. Gibson (Republican) 78.4%; ▌Harry C. Shurtleff (Democratic) 21.6%

== Virginia ==
District	Incumbent			This race	
District	Representative	Party	First elected	Results	Candidates
Virginia 1	S. Otis Bland	Democratic	1918	Incumbent re-elected.	▌ ✓ S. Otis Bland (Democratic); Uncontested
Virginia 2	Joseph T. Deal	Democratic	1920	Incumbent re-elected.	▌ ✓ Joseph T. Deal (Democratic) 65.7%; ▌Menalcus Lankford (Republican) 34.3%
Virginia 3	Jack Montague	Democratic	1912	Incumbent re-elected.	▌ ✓ Jack Montague (Democratic) 100.0%; ▌C. B. Jones (Republican) 0.0%
Virginia 4	Patrick H. Drewry	Democratic	1920	Incumbent re-elected.	▌ ✓ Patrick H. Drewry (Democratic); Uncontested
Virginia 5	J. Murray Hooker	Democratic	1921 (special)	Incumbent retired. Democratic hold.	▌ ✓ Joseph Whitehead (Democratic) 76.0%; ▌G. A. De Hart (Republican) 24.0%
Virginia 6	Clifton A. Woodrum	Democratic	1922	Incumbent re-elected.	▌ ✓ Clifton A. Woodrum (Democratic) 69.0%; ▌F. W. McWane (Republican) 31.0%
Virginia 7	Thomas W. Harrison	Democratic	1916	Incumbent re-elected.	▌ ✓ Thomas W. Harrison (Democratic) 59.2%; ▌J. H. Ruebush (Republican) 33.2%; ▌Dabney C. Harrison (Independent) 7.7%
Virginia 8	R. Walton Moore	Democratic	1919 (special)	Incumbent re-elected.	▌ ✓ R. Walton Moore (Democratic) 79.9%; ▌John G. Dudley (Republican) 20.1%
Virginia 9	George C. Peery	Democratic	1922	Incumbent re-elected.	▌ ✓ George C. Peery (Democratic) 52.6%; ▌C. Henry Harman (Republican) 47.4%
Virginia 10	Henry St. George Tucker III	Democratic	1922	Incumbent re-elected.	▌ ✓ Henry St. George Tucker III (Democratic) 69.7%; ▌Henry S. Reid (Republican) 30.3%

== Washington ==
District	Incumbent			This race	
District	Representative	Party	First elected	Results	Candidates
Washington 1	John Franklin Miller	Republican	1916	Incumbent re-elected.	▌ ✓ John Franklin Miller (Republican) 78.8%; ▌David J. Williams (Democratic) 20.6%; ▌Ruby Herman (Socialist) 0.6%
Washington 2	Lindley H. Hadley	Republican	1914	Incumbent re-elected.	▌ ✓ Lindley H. Hadley (Republican) 57.4%; ▌Lloyd L. Black (Democratic) 41.4%; ▌August Toellner (Independent) 1.1%
Washington 3	Albert Johnson	Republican	1912	Incumbent re-elected.	▌ ✓ Albert Johnson (Republican) 70.5%; ▌O. M. Nelson (Progressive) 29.4%; ▌Hattie B. Cleveland (Democratic) 0.2%
Washington 4	John W. Summers	Republican	1918	Incumbent re-elected.	▌ ✓ John W. Summers (Republican) 65.3%; ▌H. C. Bohlke (Democratic) 21.6%; ▌Knute Hill (Farmer–Labor) 13.0%
Washington 5	Samuel B. Hill	Democratic	1923 (special)	Incumbent re-elected.	▌ ✓ Samuel B. Hill (Democratic) 50.7%; ▌J. E. Ferguson (Republican) 49.3%

== West Virginia ==
District	Incumbent			This race	
District	Representative	Party	First elected	Results	Candidates
West Virginia 1	Benjamin L. Rosenbloom	Republican	1920	Incumbent retired to run for U.S. senator. Republican hold.	▌ ✓ Carl G. Bachmann (Republican) 55.2%; ▌George W. Oldham (Democratic) 44.8%
West Virginia 2	Robert E. Lee Allen	Democratic	1922	Incumbent lost re-election. Republican gain.	▌ ✓ Frank L. Bowman (Republican) 50.1%; ▌Robert E. Lee Allen (Democratic) 48.5%; ▌John C. Chase (Socialist) 1.4%
West Virginia 3	Stuart F. Reed	Republican	1916	Incumbent retired. Republican hold.	▌ ✓ John M. Wolverton (Republican) 51.9%; ▌Robert H. Kidd (Democratic) 48.1%
West Virginia 4	George W. Johnson	Democratic	1922	Incumbent lost re-election. Republican gain.	▌ ✓ Harry C. Woodyard (Republican) 51.2%; ▌George W. Johnson (Democratic) 48.8%
West Virginia 5	Thomas Jefferson Lilly	Democratic	1922	Incumbent lost re-election. Republican gain.	▌ ✓ James F. Strother (Republican) 51.5%; ▌Thomas Jefferson Lilly (Democratic) 48.5%
West Virginia 6	J. Alfred Taylor	Democratic	1922	Incumbent re-elected.	▌ ✓ J. Alfred Taylor (Democratic) 49.8%; ▌Leonard S. Echols (Republican) 48.5%; ▌Fisher B. Plymale (Farmer–Labor) 1.7%

== Wisconsin ==
District	Incumbent			This race	
District	Representative	Party	First elected	Results	Candidates
Wisconsin 1	Henry A. Cooper	Republican	1920	Incumbent re-elected.	▌ ✓ Henry A. Cooper (Republican) 72.0%; ▌Calvin Stewart (Democratic) 28.0%
Wisconsin 2	Edward Voigt	Republican	1916	Incumbent re-elected.	▌ ✓ Edward Voigt (Republican) 70.5%; ▌Ernst C. Wrucke (Democratic) 29.5%
Wisconsin 3	John M. Nelson	Republican	1920	Incumbent re-elected.	▌ ✓ John M. Nelson (Republican) 77.0%; ▌William Victoria (Democratic) 23.0%
Wisconsin 4	John C. Schafer	Republican	1922	Incumbent re-elected.	▌ ✓ John C. Schafer (Republican) 60.9%; ▌Leo Krzycki (Social-Democratic) 39.1%
Wisconsin 5	Victor L. Berger	Social-Democratic	1922	Incumbent re-elected.	▌ ✓ Victor L. Berger (Social-Democratic) 50.4%; ▌Ernst A. Braun (Republican) 49.6%
Wisconsin 6	Florian Lampert	Republican	1918	Incumbent re-elected.	▌ ✓ Florian Lampert (Republican) 70.6%; ▌M. K. Reilly (Democratic) 29.4%
Wisconsin 7	Joseph D. Beck	Republican	1920	Incumbent re-elected.	▌ ✓ Joseph D. Beck (Republican) 82.2%; ▌W. D. Martin (Democratic) 17.8%
Wisconsin 8	Edward E. Browne	Republican	1912	Incumbent re-elected.	▌ ✓ Edward E. Browne (Republican) 100.0%; ▌R. J. Walsh (Independent) 0.0%
Wisconsin 9	George J. Schneider	Republican	1922	Incumbent re-elected.	▌ ✓ George J. Schneider (Republican) 71.0%; ▌T. J. Reinert (Democratic) 29.0%
Wisconsin 10	James A. Frear	Republican	1912	Incumbent re-elected.	▌ ✓ James A. Frear (Republican) 81.6%; ▌Thomas A. Ryan (Democratic) 18.4%
Wisconsin 11	Hubert H. Peavey	Republican	1922	Incumbent re-elected.	▌ ✓ Hubert H. Peavey (Republican) 78.2%; ▌John A. Cadigan (Democratic) 21.8%

== Wyoming ==
District	Incumbent			This race	
District	Representative	Party	First elected	Results	Candidates
Wyoming at-large	Charles E. Winter	Republican	1922	Incumbent re-elected.	▌ ✓ Charles E. Winter (Republican) 58.7%; ▌Theodore Wanerus (Democratic) 38.9%; ▌D. A. Hastings (Independent) 2.4%

== Non-voting delegates ==
=== Alaska Territory ===
District	Incumbent			This race	
District	Representative	Party	First elected	Results	Candidates
Alaska Territory at-large	Daniel Sutherland	Republican	1920	Incumbent re-elected.	▌ ✓ Daniel Sutherland (Republican); [data missing]

== See also ==
- 1924 United States elections
  - 1924 United States presidential election
  - 1924 United States Senate elections
- 68th United States Congress
- 69th United States Congress
