= Jonathan Hill (theologian) =

British theologian

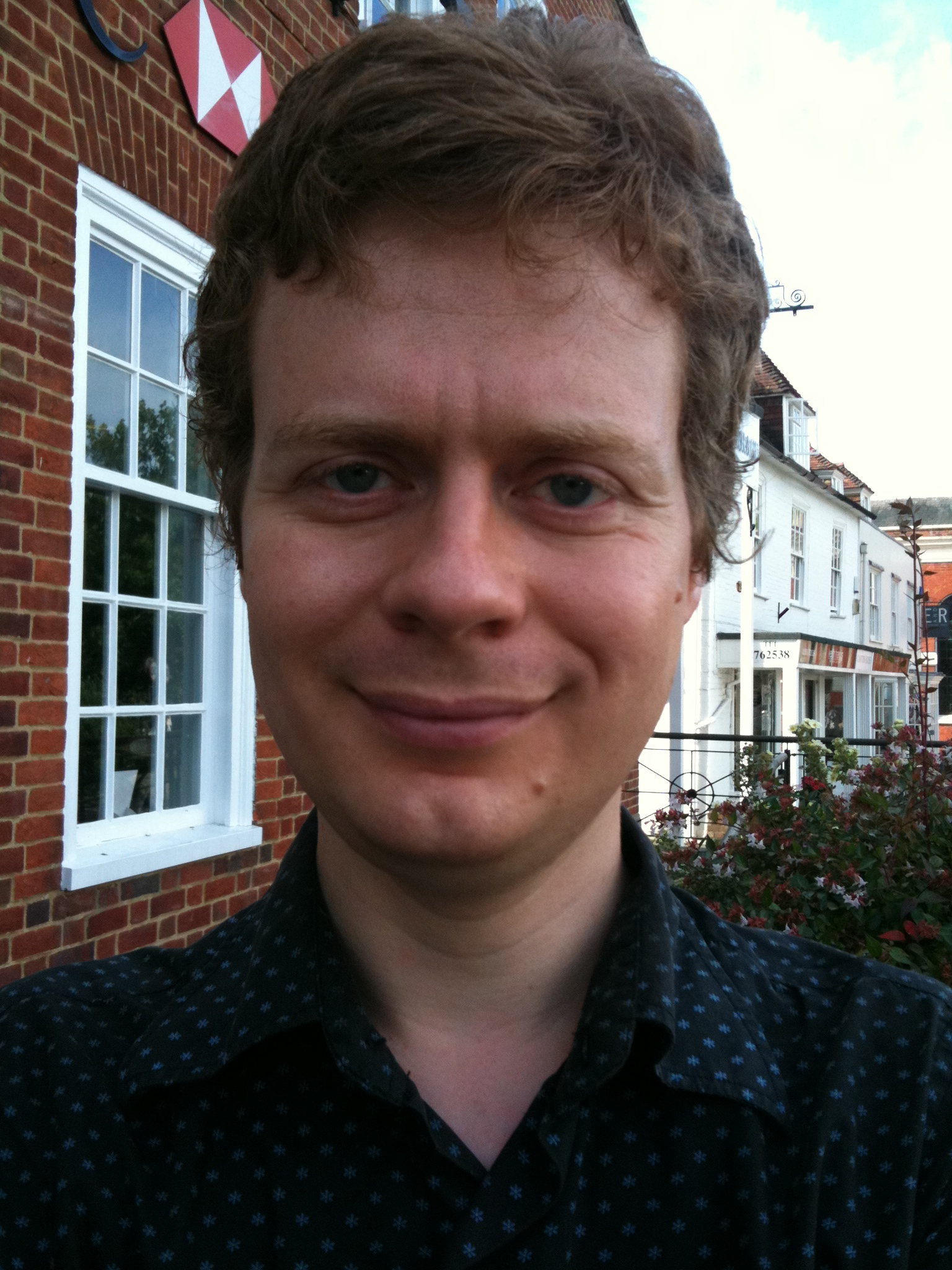
Hill in 2011

Jonathan Hill (born 30 March 1976) is a British theologian. He is the author of several books that present an analysis of the history of Christianity and the history of Christian theology in a global perspective, with a particular focus on the expression, preservation, and change of human ideas over time. His field of academic research deals with philosophical theology and seventeenth-century philosophy, particularly Gottfried Leibniz.

== Studies ==
Hill was born in Margate, East Kent, England. He has a first class degree in philosophy and theology (top of year) from Oxford University. He also has a Master of Philosophy in Theology, also from Oxford, and a Ph.D. in Philosophy from the National University of Singapore. He has worked as an independent freelance author, editor and writer since leaving Oxford in 1997. Jonathan Hill has also worked at Sky News as a subtitler since leaving Oxford University. He joined the Exeter University's Theology and Religion department as lecturer in Philosophy of Religion in 2013.

== Books ==
Hill's work has been noted for his in-depth knowledge of theology and philosophy and his ability to make complex subjects accessible to all.

Apart from his published research he has written a number of books intended to introduce the history of theology and philosophy of religion to a wider audience. He has also given two series of public talks on Gnosticism, and on ancient mystery cults.

Jonathan Hill's books include The History of Christian Thought, 2003, Faith in the Age of Reason, 2004, What Has Christianity Ever Done for Us? (How It Shaped the Modern World, 2005, The Lion Handbook to the History of Christianity published in US as Zondervan Handbook to the History of Christianity (The History of Christianity), The Big Questions, 2007 and The Crucible of Christianity, 2010.

The Crucible of Christianity has been republished both as "Christianity: How a Tiny Sect From a Despised Religion Came to Dominate the Roman Empire" (Minneapolis: Fortress, 2010) and again by Lion in 2014, without pictures, as Christianity: the First 400 Years.

He is also the author of the books "The Metaphysics of Incarnation" and "The Author's Voice" are co-edited with Anna Marmodoro, both are academic volumes published by Oxford University Press.

The Big Questions, published by Lion in 2007, is a historical review of how Christians have tackled the "big questions". Hill notes in his introduction that there does “not seem to be anything like ‘the’ Christian view on anything at all, even fairly fundamental things such as the nature of God.” Hill's approach was criticised by one reviewer, Bill Muehlenberg, who says that, although the line between orthodoxy and heresy is "wobbly", theologians have the task of defining the parameters of theological orthodoxy. Muehlenberg adds that Hill's book is intended to help the reader explore the depth and nuance of the "big questions" but gives too many options to the believer, and does not provide guidance as to which path to take.

The History of Christian Thought This book is an introduction to the lives of the great theologians, from antiquity to the present, who shaped the history of Christianity. It examines the ideas/writings of those people who had a great influence on the development of Christian thought and gives an introduction to the various theological movements from the Church Fathers through the Byzantine Empire, the Middle Ages, and the Reformation, to modern history and up to the present day.

What Has Christianity Ever Done for Us?: How it Shaped the Modern World. In this book Hill covers aspects of the influence that Christianity has had on Western culture. He shows how Christianity influenced different aspects of everyday life. He shows the often hidden and obscure/unexpected connections and the way that Christianity has influenced many aspects of arts, education, society and history. The book also describes events and people in history that have affected how we think in a way that we often take for granted.

The Lion Handbook to the History of Christianity published in 2007, and published in the US under the title Zondervan Handbook to the History of Christianity, gives a presentation about how Christian theology and the Christian church has developed around the world in the last 2000 years, including the Christian missionary movement in Asia, Africa and South America.

Hill's Dictionary of Theologians to 1308, published in 2009 by James Clark Ltd. is a guide to over 300 significant theologians in the Western and Eastern traditions. It also includes notable schismatics and heretics. It was described by John G. Bales of the Westminster Seminary in California as "remarkably comprehensive" and "unique in its scope and scholarship".

=== Translations ===
Some of Hill's works, such as The History of Christian Thought has been translated into other languages too, for example into Swedish. Luther's biographer Per Beskow translated the Swedish edition. Beskow added extra details about specifically Swedish issues. The book is extremely popular in Sweden.
