= John Hills =

John Hills may refer to:

- Sir John Hills (social scientist) (1954–2020), English sociologist and academic
- John Hills (footballer) (born 1978), English footballer
- John Hills (racehorse trainer) (c. 1960–2014), British racehorse trainer
- John Hills (politician) (1867–1938), British Conservative politician
- John Hills (priest) (died 1626), priest and academic

== See also ==
- John Hill (disambiguation)
- Hills (disambiguation)
