= Jon Hill =

Jon Hill may refer to:

- Jon Michael Hill (born 1985), American actor
- Jon Hill (chef) (born 1954), American chef
- Jon A. Hill (born 1963), United States Navy admiral
- Jon Hill (footballer) (active 1997–2002), British footballer, see List of Hereford United F.C. players

== See also ==
- John Hill (disambiguation)
- Jonathan Hill (disambiguation)
- Jonny Hill (rugby union) (born 1994), English rugby union player
- Hill (surname)
