= John Hill (Queensland cricketer) =

Australian cricketer (born 1956)

Personal information
- Born: 11 November 1956 (age 70); Waratah, New South Wales, Australia
- Source: Cricinfo, 3 October 2020

John Hill (born 11 November 1956) is an Australian cricketer. He played in seven first-class matches for Queensland in 1986/87.

== See also ==
- List of Queensland first-class cricketers
