= John Hill (rugby league) =

English rugby league footballer

Personal information
- Born: c. 1919
- Died: 1994 (aged 75)

Playing information
Club
Years	Team	Pld	T	G	FG	P
1944–56	Castleford	158	3	0	0	9

John Hill (c. 1919 – 1994) was a professional rugby league footballer who played in the 1940s and 1950s. He played at club level for Castleford.
