= John Hill (rugby union) =

- Born: John H. Hill

Rugby union career
- Position: prop
International career
Years	Team	Apps	(Points)
1925	Wallabies	1	(0)

John H. Hill was a rugby union player who represented Australia.

Hill, a prop, claimed 1 international rugby cap for Australia.
