= John Hill (cartoonist) =

New Zealand cartoonist

John Cecil Hill (1889-1974) was a New Zealand cartoonist and artist, usually referred to as J. C. Hill. He was born in Sheffield and worked as a 'tea planter in Ceylon and a commercial turtle hunter' before moving to New Zealand.

He was the Auckland Star's first cartoonist, holding the position 1927 to 1952. His work appeared in Tatler, the Bulletin and Time.

He served in the First World War and held a number of military positions in New Zealand after the war, before becoming a professional cartoonist.
