= Bill Muehlenberg =

Australian Christian cultural commentator

Bill Muehlenberg (born 1953) is an Australian conservative Christian cultural commentator. He is best known for his CultureWatch blog.

Muehlenberg was born in the United States and converted to Christianity as a young man. He studied at Wheaton College and Gordon-Conwell Theological Seminary and served as a missionary in the Netherlands with Youth With A Mission. Muehlenberg emigrated to Australia in 1989. He was previously Vice President of the Australian Family Association.

Since 2006 Muehlenberg has been an active blogger, writing more than 7000 articles on his CultureWatch website.
