= John Peter Hill =

Condensed matter physicist

- Born: 1965 (age 60–61)
- Education: Massachusetts Institute of Technology
- Awards: APS Fellow
- Scientific career
- Fields: Condensed matter
- Workplaces: Brookhaven National Laboratory
- Thesis: Magnetic scattering studies of the three-dimensional random field Ising model (1992)

John Peter Hill (born 1965) is a condensed matter physicist at Brookhaven National Laboratory, who has focused on the study of electron dynamics in a range of materials, using resonant elastic and inelastic scattering. A fellow of the American Physical Society, he has served as the Interim Director of Brookhaven since September 23, 2025.

== Education ==
Hill earned his baccalaureate degree in physics at Imperial College London, and his Ph.D. at the Massachusetts Institute of Technology. His 1992 dissertation was "Magnetic scattering studies of the three-dimensional random field Ising model". Hill made magnetic scattering studies of the three-dimensional random-field Ising model, specifically focusing on diluted antiferromagnets.

== Career ==
Hill joined Brookhaven's Physics Department as a postdoc in 1992, and he had been director of the National Synchrotron Light Source II since 2015. He was the group leader of the x-ray scattering group in Brookhaven's Condensed Matter Physics and Materials Science Department, and Director of the Experimental Facilities Division in the NSLS-II construction project.

He served as director of the National Synchrotron Light Source II, and as deputy associate lab director for energy and photon sciences. Hill also led the laboratory directed research and development program, and had responsibilities for research security, the Advanced Technology Research Office, the Computational Science Initiative, the Research Partnership and Tech Transfer Office and the National Security Program Office.

Widely known as a world leader in x-ray scattering research, Hill was named Deputy Director for Science and Technology at Brookhaven in 2023, following an international search. In September 2025, upon the resignation of lab director JoAnne Hewitt, Brookhaven Science Associates named John Hill Interim Director of Brookhaven National Laboratory.

In September 2025, United States Secretary of Energy Chris Wright met with Hill and other Brookhaven officials as part of his nationwide tour of the Department of Energy's 17 national laboratories. Hill said of the visit, "For me, the Secretary's visit was both affirmation and motivation. It reminded us that our work is valued at the highest levels and reinforced a simple truth: when we work together, safely and with purpose, we can achieve amazing things."

Hill met with Darío Gil, the U.S. Department of Energy's Under Secretary for Science, to officially end the operational era of the Relativistic Heavy Ion Collider, in February 2026, after 25 years of accelerating streams of ions into each other. Hill said, "The science will continue... We're here to celebrate that success story."

== Selected publications ==
- Hill, John; Campbell, Stuart; Carini, Gabriella; Chen-Wiegart, Yu-Chen Karen; Chu, Yong; Fluerasu, Andrei; Fukuto, Masafumi; Idir, Mourad; Jakoncic, Jean; Jarrige, Ignace; Siddons, Peter; Tanabe, Toshi; Yager, Kevin G (2020-06-18). "Future trends in synchrotron science at NSLS-II". Journal of Physics: Condensed Matter. 32 (37): 374008. doi:10.1088/1361-648X/ab7b19. ISSN 0953-8984.
- Ament, Luuk J. P.; van Veenendaal, Michel; Devereaux, Thomas P.; Hill, John P.; van den Brink, Jeroen (2011-06-24). "Resonant inelastic x-ray scattering studies of elementary excitations". Reviews of Modern Physics. 83 (2): 705–767. arXiv:1009.3630. doi:10.1103/RevModPhys.83.705. ISSN 0034-6861.
- Burriel, Mónica; Wilkins, Stuart; Hill, John P.; Muñoz-Márquez, Miguel A.; Brongersma, Hidde H.; Kilner, John A.; Ryan, Mary P.; Skinner, Stephen J. (2014). "Absence of Ni on the outer surface of Sr doped La 2 NiO 4 single crystals". Energy & Environmental Science. 7 (1): 311–316. doi:10.1039/C3EE41622D.
- Calder, S.; Vale, J. G.; Bogdanov, N. A.; Liu, X.; Donnerer, C.; Upton, M. H.; Casa, D.; Said, A. H.; Lumsden, M. D.; Zhao, Z.; Yan, J.-Q.; Mandrus, D.; Nishimoto, S.; van den Brink, J.; Hill, J. P. (2016-06-07). "Spin-orbit-driven magnetic structure and excitation in the 5d pyrochlore Cd2Os2O7". Nature Communications. 7 (1) 11651. doi:10.1038/ncomms11651. ISSN 2041-1723. PMC 4899614.

== Awards, honors ==
- 2012 Brookhaven Lab Science and Technology Award, Condensed Matter Physics and Materials Science, consisting of "a plaque and $10,000 ...the highest accolades given by Brookhaven to its employees".
- 2002 American Physical Society, Division of Condensed Matter Physics Fellowship, cited For novel x-ray scattering studies of cuprate, manganite and other correlated electronic systems, 2002.
- 1996 Presidential Early Career Award.
- 1996 U.S. Department of Energy's Young Independent Scientist Award
