= Jack Hill (footballer, born 1908) =

English footballer (1908–c.1937)

Personal information
- Full name: John Thomas Hill
- Date of birth: 1908
- Place of birth: Monkwearmouth, County Durham, England
- Height: 5 ft 8 1/2 in (1.74 m)
- Position: Centre forward

Senior career*
Years	Team	Apps	(Gls)
–	Esh Winning		
–	Jarrow		
1928–1929	Newport County	2	(0)
1929–1931	Darlington	22	(14)
–	West Stanley		
1932–1934	Spennymoor United		
1934	Ramsgate		
1934–1937	Spennymoor United		
1937–193?	Horden Colliery Welfare		
- * Club domestic league appearances and goals

John Thomas Hill (1908 – after 1937) was an English footballer who played as a centre forward in the Football League for Newport County and Darlington, and in non-league football for Esh Winning, Jarrow, West Stanley, Spennymoor United, and Horden Colliery Welfare.

== Life and career ==
At the time of the 1911 Census, the three-year-old Hill was the youngest of eight surviving children of William Hill, a coal miner, and his wife Ann. He was born in the Monkwearmouth area of Sunderland, which was then in County Durham. He played football for Esh Winning and Jarrow before signing for Football League club Newport County in 1928. He played only twice in Third Division matches, but scored more than 40 goals for the club's other teams. He returned to the north-east of England at the end of the 1928–29 season and signed for Darlington.

On the same day, Darlington signed Peterborough & Fletton United's Maurice Wellock, whose goal record, of 71 goals from 104 league matches over three seasons, illustrates why he was preferred to Hill at centre-forward. Hill played infrequently, either in the absence of Wellock or with Wellock alongside him at inside forward, and scored 14 goals from 22 league appearances over two seasons, which included two hat-tricks. The first was against South Shields in an 8–3 victory, and the second came in the first half of a 5–2 defeat of York City, though the Yorkshire Post reported that the first of the three goals failed to cross the line and the third was offside. As he had been with Newport, he was prolific at reserve-team level, but at the end of the 1930–31 season, he was given a free transfer, and he signed for North-Eastern League club West Stanley.

After a season with West Stanley, Hill, "a very good centre forward and a strong shot", joined Spennymoor United, with whom he was to spend the next five years, apart from a brief foray to Ramsgate at the start of the 1934–35 season. In 1937, the Football Association gave permission for the club to arrange a testimonial match in appreciation of his services. "One of the most prolific scorers in the North Eastern League during the past five seasons" – he scored more than 200 goals for Spennymoor, including 54 in 1936–37 – he signed for Horden Colliery Welfare for 1937–38 and was expected to "get a 'bagful' of goals".
