= 67th United States Congress =

1921–1923 U.S. Congress

←	66th	68th	→
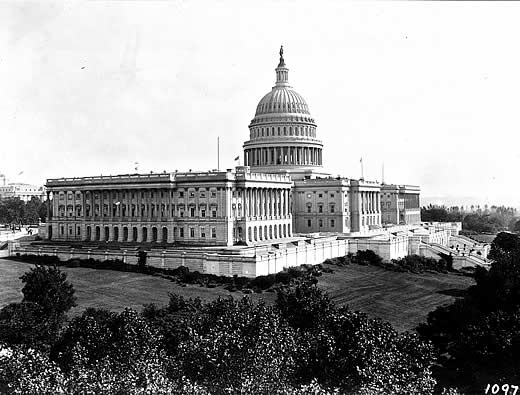
- United States Capitol (1906)

Overview
- Legislative body: United States Congress
- Jurisdiction: United States
- Term: March 4, 1921 – March 4, 1923

Senate
- Members: 96
- President: Calvin Coolidge (R)
- President pro tempore: Albert B. Cummins (R)
- Party control: Republican

House of Representatives
- Members: 435 representatives 5 non-voting delegates
- Speaker: Frederick H. Gillett (R)
- Party control: Republican

Sessions
- Special (Note: Special session of the Senate.): March 4, 1921 – March 15, 1921
- 1st: April 11, 1921 – November 23, 1921
- 2nd: December 5, 1921 – September 22, 1922
- 3rd: November 20, 1922 – December 4, 1922
- 4th: December 4, 1922 – March 3, 1923

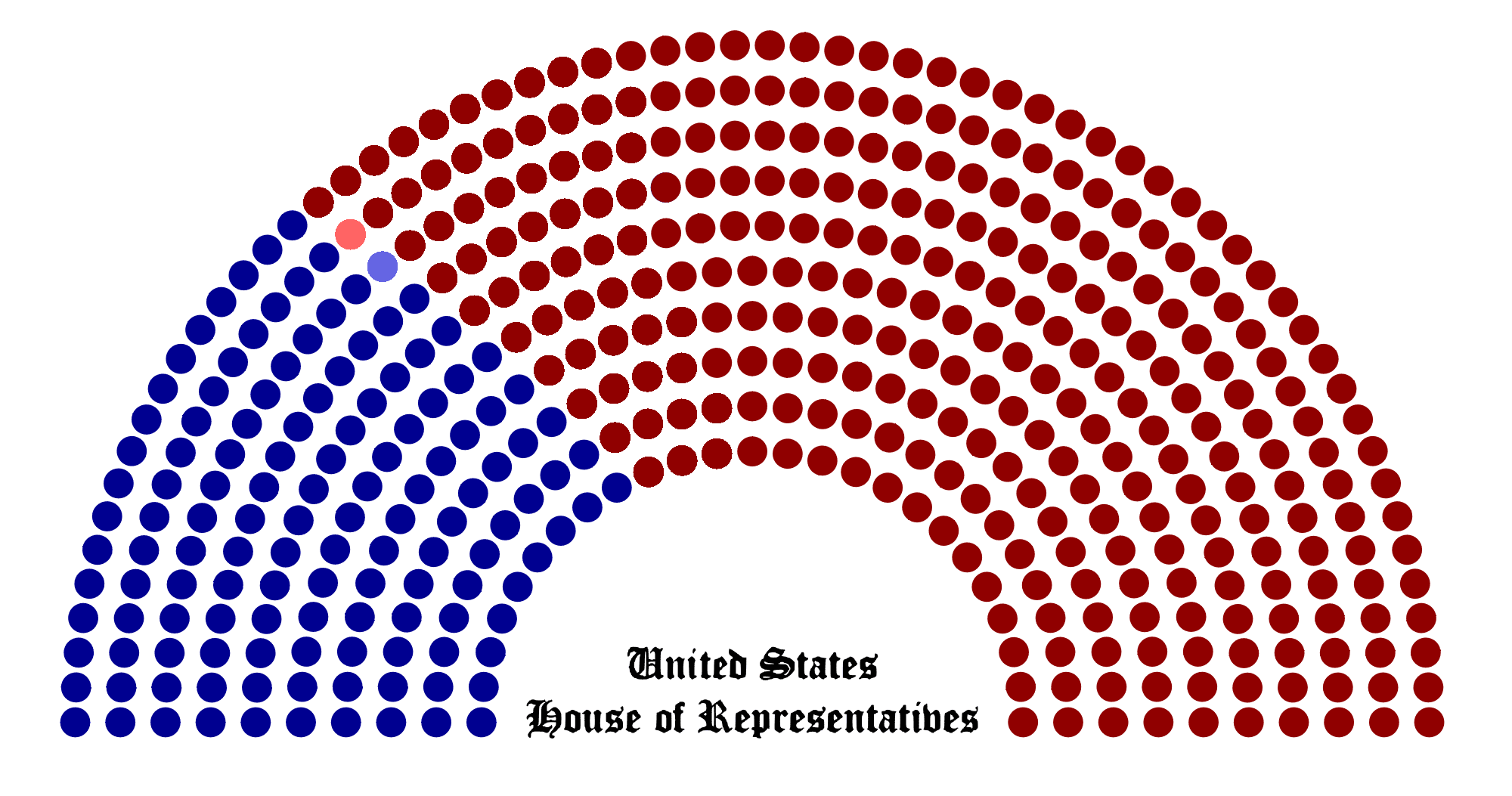
House Party standings (at the beginning of this Congress) 302 Republicans 131 Democrats 1 Socialist 1 Independent Republican

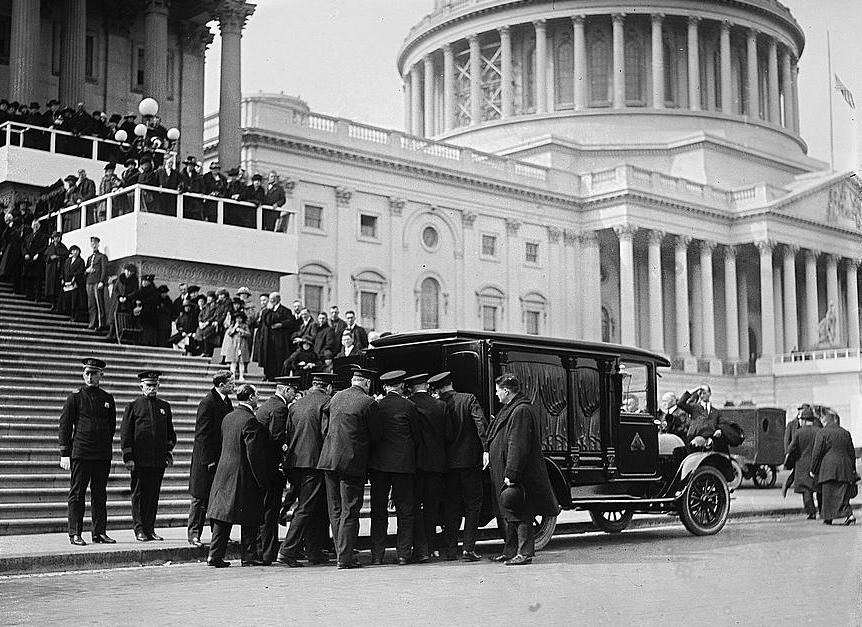
Funeral of former Speaker of the House, Champ Clark, March 5, 1921, in front of the United States Capitol.

The 67th United States Congress was a meeting of the legislative branch of the United States federal government, consisting of the United States Senate and the United States House of Representatives. It met in Washington, D.C., from March 4, 1921, to March 4, 1923, during the first two years of Warren Harding's presidency. The apportionment of seats in the House of Representatives was based on the 1910 United States census.

The Republicans increased their majorities in both chambers—gaining supermajority status in the House—and with Warren G. Harding being sworn in a president, this gave the Republicans an overall federal government trifecta for the first time since the 61st Congress in 1909.

This was the first Congress to feature a woman senator appointed in the United States Senate, Rebecca L. Felton of Georgia, who held in office for one day.

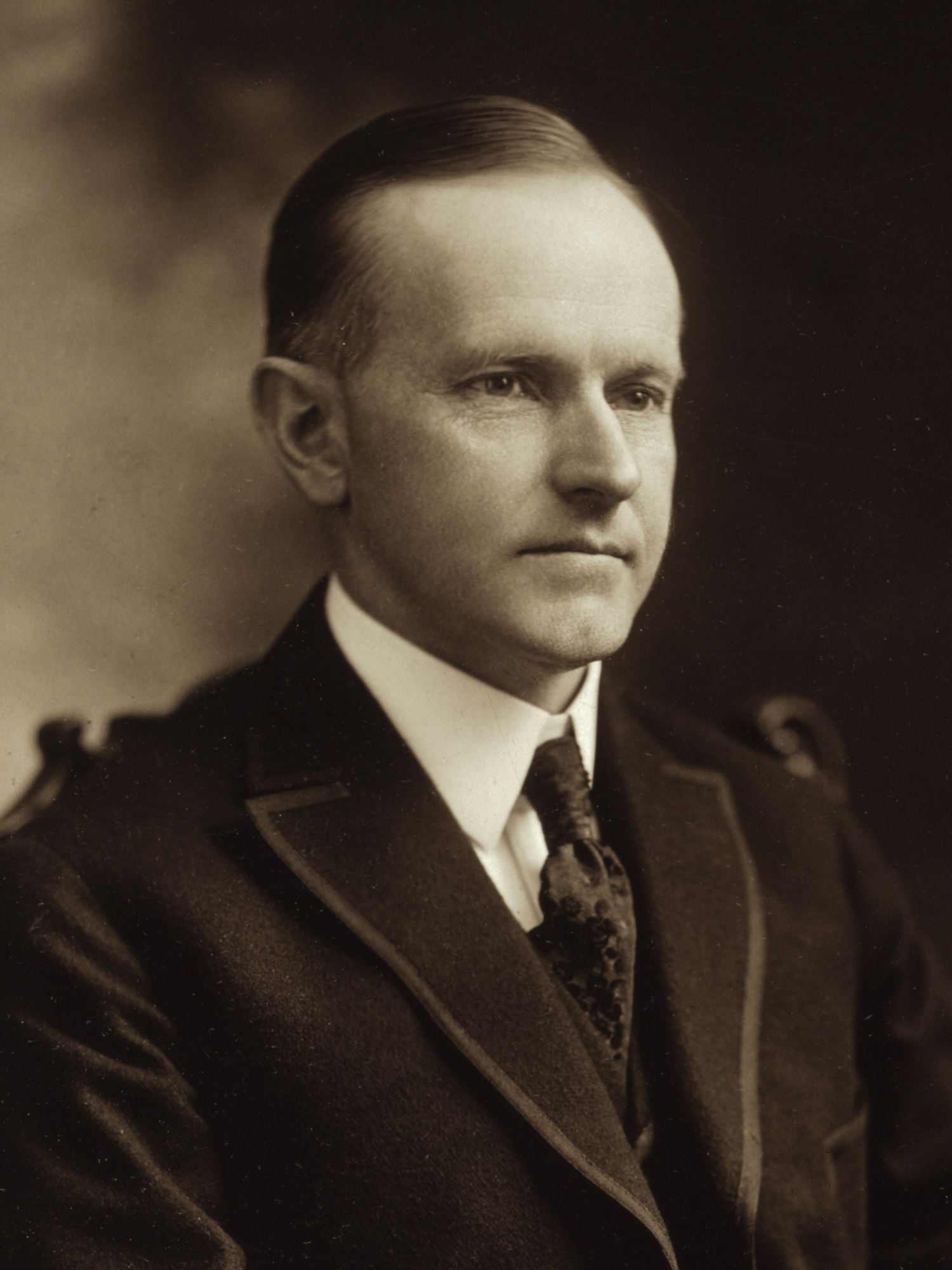
President of the Senate Calvin Coolidge

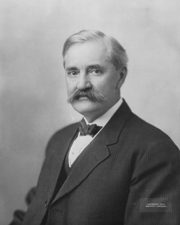
President pro tempore Albert B. Cummins

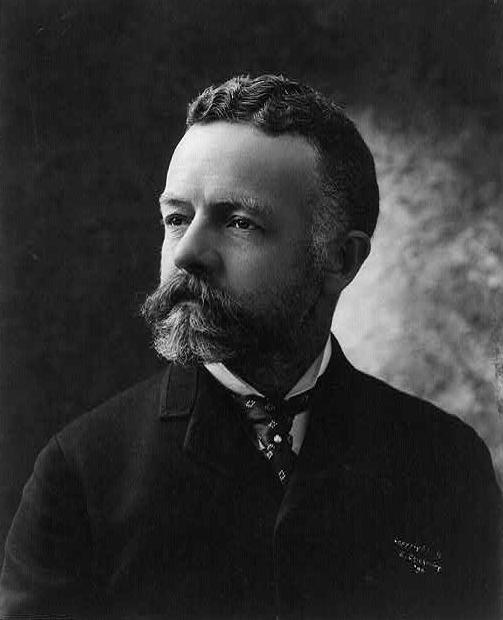
Senate Majority Leader Henry Cabot Lodge

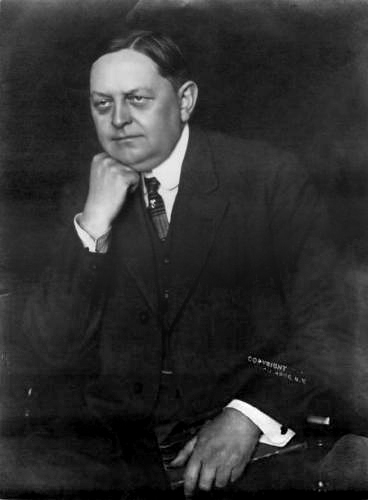
Senate Minority Leader Oscar Underwood

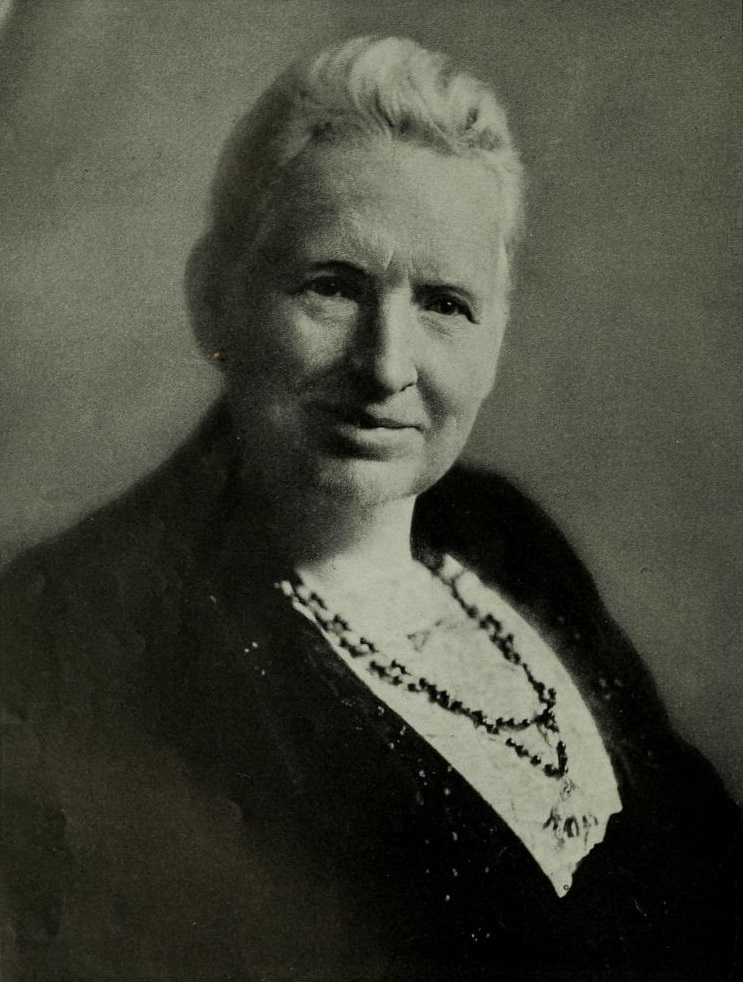
Alice M. Robertson became the first woman to preside over the House chamber in 1921

== Major events ==
- March 4, 1921: Warren G. Harding inaugurated as President of the United States

== Major legislation ==
- April 30, 1921: Port Authority of New York and New Jersey (under an interstate compact entered into by the State of New York and State of New Jersey)
- May 19, 1921: Emergency Quota Act (Johnson Quota Act), Sess. 1, ch. 8, 42 Stat. 5
- May 27, 1921: Emergency Tariff of 1921, Sess. 1, ch. 14, 42 Stat. 9
- June 10, 1921: Budget and Accounting Act of 1921 (Good–McCormack Act)
- June 10, 1921: Willis Graham Act
- July 2, 1921: Knox–Porter Resolution
- July 9, 1921: Hawaiian Homes Commission Act of 1921
- July 12, 1921: Naval Appropriations Act For 1922
- August 15, 1921: Packers and Stockyards Act of 1921
- August 15, 1921: Poultry Racket Act
- August 24, 1921: Future Trading Act (Capper–Tincher Act), Sess. 1, ch. 86, 42 Stat. 187
- November 9, 1921: Federal Aid Highway Act of 1921 (Phipps–Dowell Act)
- November 23, 1921: Revenue Act of 1921, Sess. 1, ch. 136, 42 Stat. 227
- November 23, 1921: Willis–Campbell Act
- November 23, 1921: Sheppard–Towner Act
- December 22, 1921: Russian Famine Relief Act
- February 9, 1922: World War Foreign Debts Commission Act
- February 18, 1922: Capper–Volstead Act
- February 18, 1922: Patent Act of 1922
- March 4, 1922: Model Marine Insurance Act of 1922
- March 20, 1922: Seed and Grain Loan Act
- March 20, 1922: General Exchange Act of 1922
- May 11, 1922: Agricultural Appropriation Act of 1923
- May 15, 1922: Irrigation Districts and Farm Loans Act (Raker Act)
- May 26, 1922: Narcotic Drugs Import and Export Act (Jones-Miller Act)
- June 10, 1922: Joint Service Pay Readjustment Act
- June 30, 1922: Lodge–Fish Resolution
- July 1, 1922: Scrapping of Naval Vessels Act
- August 31, 1922: Honeybee Act
- September 14, 1922: Judges Act of 1922 (Cummins–Walsh Act)
- September 19, 1922: China Trade Act of 1922
- September 21, 1922: Commodity Exchange Act
- September 21, 1922: Fordney–McCumber Tariff, Sess. 2, ch. 356, 42 Stat. 858
- September 21, 1922: Grain Futures Act, Sess. 2, ch. 369, 42 Stat. 998
- September 22, 1922: Cable Act (Married Women's Citizenship Act), Sess. 2, ch. 411, 42 Stat. 1021
- September 22, 1922: Fuel Distributor Act (Lever Act)
- September 22, 1922: River and Harbors Act of 1922
- January 5, 1923: Foreign and Domestic Commerce Act of 1923
- February 26, 1923: Agricultural Appropriations Act of 1924
- February 28, 1923: British War Debt Act of 1923 (Smoot–Burton Act)
- March 2, 1923: Porter Resolution
- March 3, 1923: River and Harbors Act of 1923
- March 3, 1923: Naval Stores Act of 1923
- March 4, 1923: Partial Payment Act (Winslow Act)
- March 4, 1923: Butter Standards Act of 1923
- March 4, 1923: Filled Milk Act of 1923
- March 4, 1923: Cotton Standards Act of 1923
- March 4, 1923: National Bank Tax Act of 1923
- March 4, 1923: Agricultural Credits Act (Capper–Linroot–Anderson Act)
- March 4, 1923: Classification Act of 1923 (Sterling–Lehlbach Act)
- March 4, 1923: Flood Control Act of 1923
- March 4, 1923: Mills Act of 1923

== Party summary ==
The count below identifies party affiliations at the beginning of the first session of this Congress, and includes members from vacancies and newly admitted states, when they were first seated. Changes resulting from subsequent replacements are shown below in the "Changes in membership" section.

=== Senate ===
	Party (shading shows control)			Total	Vacant
	Democratic (D)	Farmer– Labor (FL)	Republican (R)	Total	Vacant
End of previous congress	46	0	50	96	0
Begin	37	0	59	96	0
End	37	0	59	96	0
Final voting share	38.5%	0.0%	61.5%		
Beginning of next congress	42	1	53	96	0

=== House of Representatives ===
	Party (shading shows control)						Total	Vacant
	Democratic (D)	Socialist (Soc.)	Farmer– Labor (FL)	Republican (R)	Independent Republican (IR)	Other	Total	Vacant
End of previous congress	187	0	1	238	1	1 (Note: Prohibition)	428	7
Begin	131	1	0	299	1	0	432	3
End	130	1	0	295	1	0	427	8
Final voting share	30.4%	0.2%	0.0%	69.1%	0.2%	0.0%		
Beginning of next congress	206	1	2	223	0	0	432	3

== Leadership ==
=== Senate ===
- President: Calvin Coolidge (R)
- President pro tempore: Albert B. Cummins (R)

==== Majority (Republican) leadership ====
- Majority Leader: Henry Cabot Lodge
- Majority Whip: Charles Curtis
- Republican Conference Secretary: James Wolcott Wadsworth Jr.
- National Senatorial Committee Chair: Joseph M. McCormick

==== Minority (Democratic) leadership ====
- Minority Leader: Oscar Underwood
- Minority Whip: Peter G. Gerry
- Democratic Caucus Secretary: William H. King

=== House of Representatives ===
- Speaker: Frederick H. Gillett (R)

==== Majority (Republican) leadership ====
- Majority Leader: Franklin Mondell
- Majority Whip: Harold Knutson
- Republican Conference Chairman: Horace Mann Towner
- Republican Campaign Committee Chairman: Simeon D. Fess, until 1922
  - William R. Wood, from 1922

==== Minority (Democratic) leadership ====
- Minority Leader: Claude Kitchin
- Minority Whip: William Allan Oldfield
- Democratic Caucus Chairman: Sam Rayburn
- Democratic Campaign Committee Chairman: Arthur B. Rouse

== Members ==
This list is arranged by chamber, then by state. Senators are listed by class; representatives are listed by district.

Skip to House of Representatives, below

=== Senate ===
Senators were elected every two years, with one-third beginning new six-year terms with each Congress. Preceding the names in the list below are Senate class numbers, which indicate the cycle of their election. In this Congress, Class 1 meant their term ended with this Congress, requiring re-election in 1922; Class 2 meant their term began in the last Congress, requiring re-election in 1924; and Class 3 meant their term began with this Congress, requiring re-election in 1926.

==== Alabama ====
▌2. J. Thomas Heflin (D)
▌3. Oscar Underwood (D)

==== Arizona ====
▌1. Henry F. Ashurst (D)
▌3. Ralph H. Cameron (R)

==== Arkansas ====
▌2. Joseph Taylor Robinson (D)
▌3. Thaddeus H. Caraway (D)

==== California ====
▌1. Hiram W. Johnson (R)
▌3. Samuel M. Shortridge (R)

==== Colorado ====
▌2. Lawrence C. Phipps (R)
▌3. Samuel D. Nicholson (R)

==== Connecticut ====
▌1. George P. McLean (R)
▌3. Frank B. Brandegee (R)

==== Delaware ====
▌1. Josiah O. Wolcott (D), until July 2, 1921

▌T. Coleman du Pont (R), from July 7, 1921, until November 7, 1922
▌Thomas F. Bayard Jr. (D), from November 8, 1922

▌2. L. Heisler Ball (R)

==== Florida ====
▌1. Park Trammell (D)
▌3. Duncan U. Fletcher (D)

==== Georgia ====
▌2. William J. Harris (D)
▌3. Thomas E. Watson (D), until September 26, 1922

▌Rebecca L. Felton (D), from November 21, 1922 until November 22, 1922
▌Walter F. George (D), from November 22, 1922

==== Idaho ====
▌2. William E. Borah (R)
▌3. Frank R. Gooding (R)

==== Illinois ====
▌2. J. Medill McCormick (R)
▌3. William B. McKinley (R)

==== Indiana ====
▌1. Harry S. New (R)
▌3. James E. Watson (R)

==== Iowa ====
▌2. William S. Kenyon (R), until February 24, 1922

▌Charles A. Rawson (R), from February 24, 1922, until November 7, 1922
▌Smith W. Brookhart (R), from November 8, 1922

▌3. Albert B. Cummins (R)

==== Kansas ====
▌2. Arthur Capper (R)
▌3. Charles Curtis (R)

==== Kentucky ====
▌2. Augustus O. Stanley (D)
▌3. Richard P. Ernst (R)

==== Louisiana ====
▌2. Joseph E. Ransdell (D)
▌3. Edwin S. Broussard (D)

==== Maine ====
▌1. Frederick Hale (R)
▌2. Bert M. Fernald (R)

==== Maryland ====
▌1. Joseph I. France (R)
▌3. Ovington E. Weller (R)

==== Massachusetts ====
▌1. Henry Cabot Lodge (R)
▌2. David I. Walsh (D)

==== Michigan ====
▌1. Charles E. Townsend (R)
▌2. Truman H. Newberry (R), until November 18, 1922

▌James J. Couzens (R), from November 29, 1922

==== Minnesota ====
▌1. Frank B. Kellogg (R)
▌2. Knute Nelson (R)

==== Mississippi ====
▌1. John Sharp Williams (D)
▌2. Pat Harrison (D)

==== Missouri ====
▌1. James A. Reed (D)
▌3. Selden P. Spencer (R)

==== Montana ====
▌1. Henry L. Myers (D)
▌2. Thomas J. Walsh (D)

==== Nebraska ====
▌1. Gilbert M. Hitchcock (D)
▌2. George W. Norris (R)

==== Nevada ====
▌1. Key Pittman (D)
▌3. Tasker Oddie (R)

==== New Hampshire ====
▌2. Henry W. Keyes (R)
▌3. George H. Moses (R)

==== New Jersey ====
▌1. Joseph S. Frelinghuysen (R)
▌2. Walter E. Edge (R)

==== New Mexico ====
▌1. Andrieus A. Jones (D)
▌2. Albert B. Fall (R), until March 4, 1921

▌Holm O. Bursum (R), from March 11, 1921

==== New York ====
▌1. William M. Calder (R)
▌3. James W. Wadsworth Jr. (R)

==== North Carolina ====
▌2. Furnifold M. Simmons (D)
▌3. Lee S. Overman (D)

==== North Dakota ====
▌1. Porter J. McCumber (R)
▌3. Edwin F. Ladd (R)

==== Ohio ====
▌1. Atlee Pomerene (D)
▌3. Frank B. Willis (R)

==== Oklahoma ====
▌2. Robert L. Owen (D)
▌3. John W. Harreld (R)

==== Oregon ====
▌2. Charles L. McNary (R)
▌3. Robert N. Stanfield (R)

==== Pennsylvania ====
▌1. Philander C. Knox (R), until October 12, 1921

▌William E. Crow (R), from October 24, 1921, until August 2, 1922
▌David A. Reed (R), from August 8, 1922

▌3. Boies Penrose (R), until December 31, 1921

▌George Wharton Pepper (R), from January 9, 1922

==== Rhode Island ====
▌1. Peter G. Gerry (D)
▌2. LeBaron B. Colt (R)

==== South Carolina ====
▌2. Nathaniel B. Dial (D)
▌3. Ellison D. Smith (D)

==== South Dakota ====
▌2. Thomas Sterling (R)
▌3. Peter Norbeck (R)

==== Tennessee ====
▌1. Kenneth D. McKellar (D)
▌2. John K. Shields (D)

==== Texas ====
▌1. Charles A. Culberson (D)
▌2. Morris Sheppard (D)

==== Utah ====
▌1. William H. King (D)
▌3. Reed Smoot (R)

==== Vermont ====
▌1. Carroll S. Page (R)
▌3. William P. Dillingham (R)

==== Virginia ====
▌1. Claude A. Swanson (D)
▌2. Carter Glass (D)

==== Washington ====
▌1. Miles Poindexter (R)
▌3. Wesley L. Jones (R)

==== West Virginia ====
▌1. Howard Sutherland (R)
▌2. Davis Elkins (R)

==== Wisconsin ====
▌1. Robert M. La Follette Sr. (R)
▌3. Irvine L. Lenroot (R)

==== Wyoming ====
▌1. John B. Kendrick (D)
▌2. Francis E. Warren (R)

Senators' party membership by state at the opening of the 67th Congress in March 1921. 2 Democrats 1 Democrat and 1 Republican 2 Republicans

=== House of Representatives ===
==== Alabama ====
▌1. John McDuffie (D)
▌2. John R. Tyson (D)
▌3. Henry B. Steagall (D)
▌4. Lamar Jeffers (D), from June 7, 1921
▌5. William B. Bowling (D)
▌6. William B. Oliver (D)
▌7. Lilius Bratton Rainey (D)
▌8. Edward B. Almon (D)
▌9. George Huddleston (D)
▌10. William B. Bankhead (D)

==== Arizona ====
▌At-large. Carl Hayden (D)

==== Arkansas ====
▌1. William J. Driver (D)
▌2. William A. Oldfield (D)
▌3. John N. Tillman (D)
▌4. Otis Wingo (D)
▌5. Henderson M. Jacoway (D)
▌6. Samuel M. Taylor (D), until September 13, 1921

▌Chester W. Taylor (D), from October 25, 1921

▌7. Tilman B. Parks (D)

==== California ====
▌1. Clarence F. Lea (D)
▌2. John E. Raker (D)
▌3. Charles F. Curry (R)
▌4. Julius Kahn (R)
▌5. John I. Nolan (R), until November 18, 1922

▌Mae E. Nolan (R), from January 23, 1923

▌6. John A. Elston (R), until December 15, 1921

▌James H. MacLafferty (R), from November 7, 1922

▌7. Henry E. Barbour (R)
▌8. Arthur M. Free (R)
▌9. Walter F. Lineberger (R), from February 15, 1921
▌10. Henry Z. Osborne (R), until February 8, 1923
▌11. Philip D. Swing (R)

==== Colorado ====
▌1. William N. Vaile (R)
▌2. Charles Bateman Timberlake (R)
▌3. Guy U. Hardy (R)
▌4. Edward T. Taylor (D)

==== Connecticut ====
▌1. E. Hart Fenn (R)
▌2. Richard P. Freeman (R)
▌3. John Q. Tilson (R)
▌4. Schuyler Merritt (R)
▌5. James P. Glynn (R)

==== Delaware ====
▌At-large. Caleb R. Layton (R)

==== Florida ====
▌1. Herbert J. Drane (D)
▌2. Frank Clark (D)
▌3. John H. Smithwick (D)
▌4. William J. Sears (D)

==== Georgia ====
▌1. James W. Overstreet (D)
▌2. Frank Park (D)
▌3. Charles R. Crisp (D)
▌4. William C. Wright (D)
▌5. William D. Upshaw (D)
▌6. James W. Wise (D)
▌7. Gordon Lee (D)
▌8. Charles H. Brand (D)
▌9. Thomas Montgomery Bell (D)
▌10. Carl Vinson (D)
▌11. William C. Lankford (D)
▌12. William W. Larsen (D)

==== Idaho ====
▌1. Burton L. French (R)
▌2. Addison T. Smith (R)

==== Illinois ====
▌1. Martin B. Madden (R)
▌2. James R. Mann (R), until November 30, 1922
▌3. Elliott W. Sproul (R)
▌4. John W. Rainey (D)
▌5. Adolph J. Sabath (D)
▌6. John J. Gorman (R)
▌7. M. Alfred Michaelson (R)
▌8. Stanley H. Kunz (D)
▌9. Frederick A. Britten (R)
▌10. Carl R. Chindblom (R)
▌11. Ira C. Copley (R)
▌12. Charles Eugene Fuller (R)
▌13. John C. McKenzie (R)
▌14. William J. Graham (R)
▌15. Edward John King (R)
▌16. Clifford Ireland (R)
▌17. Frank H. Funk (R)
▌18. Joseph G. Cannon (R)
▌19. Allen F. Moore (R)
▌20. Guy L. Shaw (R)
▌21. Loren E. Wheeler (R)
▌22. William A. Rodenberg (R)
▌23. Edwin B. Brooks (R)
▌24. Thomas S. Williams (R)
▌25. Edward E. Denison (R)
▌At-large. William E. Mason (R), until June 16, 1921

▌Winnifred S. M. Huck (R), from November 7, 1922

▌At-large. Richard Yates Jr. (R)

==== Indiana ====
▌1. Oscar R. Luhring (R)
▌2. Oscar E. Bland (R)
▌3. James W. Dunbar (R)
▌4. John S. Benham (R)
▌5. Everett Sanders (R)
▌6. Richard N. Elliott (R)
▌7. Merrill Moores (R)
▌8. Albert H. Vestal (R)
▌9. Fred S. Purnell (R)
▌10. William R. Wood (R)
▌11. Milton Kraus (R)
▌12. Louis W. Fairfield (R)
▌13. Andrew J. Hickey (R)

==== Iowa ====
▌1. William F. Kopp (R)
▌2. Harry E. Hull (R)
▌3. Burton E. Sweet (R)
▌4. Gilbert N. Haugen (R)
▌5. James W. Good (R), until June 15, 1921

▌Cyrenus Cole (R), from July 19, 1921

▌6. C. William Ramseyer (R)
▌7. Cassius C. Dowell (R)
▌8. Horace M. Towner (R)
▌9. William R. Green (R)
▌10. Lester J. Dickinson (R)
▌11. William D. Boies (R)

==== Kansas ====
▌1. Daniel Read Anthony Jr. (R)
▌2. Edward C. Little (R)
▌3. Philip P. Campbell (R)
▌4. Homer Hoch (R)
▌5. James G. Strong (R)
▌6. Hays B. White (R)
▌7. Jasper N. Tincher (R)
▌8. Richard E. Bird (R)

==== Kentucky ====
▌1. Alben Barkley (D)
▌2. David Hayes Kincheloe (D)
▌3. Robert Y. Thomas Jr. (D)
▌4. Ben Johnson (D)
▌5. Charles F. Ogden (R)
▌6. Arthur B. Rouse (D)
▌7. J. Campbell Cantrill (D)
▌8. Ralph W. E. Gilbert (D)
▌9. William Jason Fields (D)
▌10. John W. Langley (R)
▌11. John M. Robsion (R)

==== Louisiana ====
▌1. James O'Connor (D)
▌2. Henry Garland Dupré (D)
▌3. Whitmell P. Martin (D)
▌4. John N. Sandlin (D)
▌5. Riley Joseph Wilson (D)
▌6. George K. Favrot (D)
▌7. Ladislas Lazaro (D)
▌8. James Benjamin Aswell (D)

==== Maine ====
▌1. Carroll L. Beedy (R)
▌2. Wallace H. White Jr. (R)
▌3. John A. Peters (R), until January 2, 1922

▌John E. Nelson (R), from March 20, 1922

▌4. Ira G. Hersey (R)

==== Maryland ====
▌1. T. Alan Goldsborough (D)
▌2. Albert Blakeney (R)
▌3. John Philip Hill (R)
▌4. J. Charles Linthicum (D)
▌5. Sydney Emanuel Mudd II (R)
▌6. Frederick N. Zihlman (R)

==== Massachusetts ====
▌1. Allen T. Treadway (R)
▌2. Frederick H. Gillett (R)
▌3. Calvin D. Paige (R)
▌4. Samuel E. Winslow (R)
▌5. John J. Rogers (R)
▌6. Willfred W. Lufkin (R), until June 30, 1921

▌A. Piatt Andrew Jr. (R), from September 27, 1921

▌7. Robert S. Maloney (R)
▌8. Frederick W. Dallinger (R)
▌9. Charles L. Underhill (R)
▌10. Peter F. Tague (D)
▌11. George H. Tinkham (R)
▌12. James A. Gallivan (D)
▌13. Robert Luce (R)
▌14. Louis A. Frothingham (R)
▌15. William S. Greene (R)
▌16. Joseph Walsh (R), until August 2, 1922

▌Charles L. Gifford (R), from November 7, 1922

==== Michigan ====
▌1. George P. Codd (R)
▌2. Earl C. Michener (R)
▌3. William H. Frankhauser (R), until May 9, 1921

▌John M. C. Smith (R), from June 28, 1921

▌4. John C. Ketcham (R)
▌5. Carl Mapes (R)
▌6. Patrick H. Kelley (R)
▌7. Louis C. Cramton (R)
▌8. Joseph W. Fordney (R)
▌9. James C. McLaughlin (R)
▌10. Roy O. Woodruff (R)
▌11. Frank D. Scott (R)
▌12. W. Frank James (R)
▌13. Vincent M. Brennan (R)

==== Minnesota ====
▌1. Sydney Anderson (R)
▌2. Frank Clague (R)
▌3. Charles Russell Davis (R)
▌4. Oscar E. Keller (R)
▌5. Walter H. Newton (R)
▌6. Harold Knutson (R)
▌7. Andrew Volstead (R)
▌8. Oscar J. Larson (R)
▌9. Halvor Steenerson (R)
▌10. Thomas D. Schall (R)

==== Mississippi ====
▌1. John E. Rankin (D)
▌2. Bill G. Lowrey (D)
▌3. Benjamin G. Humphreys II (D)
▌4. Thomas U. Sisson (D)
▌5. Ross A. Collins (D)
▌6. Paul B. Johnson Sr. (D)
▌7. Percy E. Quin (D)
▌8. James W. Collier (D)

==== Missouri ====
▌1. Frank C. Millspaugh (R), until December 5, 1922
▌2. William W. Rucker (D)
▌3. Henry F. Lawrence (R)
▌4. Charles L. Faust (R)
▌5. Edgar C. Ellis (R)
▌6. William O. Atkeson (R)
▌7. Roscoe C. Patterson (R)
▌8. Sidney C. Roach (R)
▌9. Theodore W. Hukriede (R)
▌10. Cleveland A. Newton (R)
▌11. Harry B. Hawes (D)
▌12. Leonidas C. Dyer (R)
▌13. Marion E. Rhodes (R)
▌14. Edward D. Hays (R)
▌15. Isaac V. McPherson (R)
▌16. Samuel A. Shelton (R)

==== Montana ====
▌1. Washington J. McCormick (R)
▌2. Carl W. Riddick (R)

==== Nebraska ====
▌1. C. Frank Reavis (R), until June 3, 1922

▌Roy H. Thorpe (R), from November 7, 1922

▌2. Albert W. Jefferis (R)
▌3. Robert E. Evans (R)
▌4. Melvin O. McLaughlin (R)
▌5. William E. Andrews (R)
▌6. Moses P. Kinkaid (R), until July 6, 1922

▌Augustin R. Humphrey (R), from November 7, 1922

==== Nevada ====
▌At-large. Samuel S. Arentz (R)

==== New Hampshire ====
▌1. Sherman Everett Burroughs (R), until January 27, 1923
▌2. Edward Hills Wason (R)

==== New Jersey ====
▌1. Francis F. Patterson Jr. (R)
▌2. Isaac Bacharach (R)
▌3. T. Frank Appleby (R)
▌4. Elijah C. Hutchinson (R)
▌5. Ernest R. Ackerman (R)
▌6. Randolph Perkins (R)
▌7. Amos H. Radcliffe (R)
▌8. Herbert W. Taylor (R)
▌9. Richard Wayne Parker (R)
▌10. Frederick R. Lehlbach (R)
▌11. Archibald E. Olpp (R)
▌12. Charles F. X. O'Brien (D)

==== New Mexico ====
▌At-large. Néstor Montoya (R), until January 13, 1923

==== New York ====
▌1. Frederick C. Hicks (R)
▌2. John J. Kindred (D)
▌3. John Kissel (R)
▌4. Thomas H. Cullen (D)
▌5. Ardolph L. Kline (R)
▌6. Warren I. Lee (R)
▌7. Michael J. Hogan (R)
▌8. Charles G. Bond (R)
▌9. Andrew N. Petersen (R)
▌10. Lester D. Volk (R)
▌11. Daniel J. Riordan (D)
▌12. Meyer London (Soc.)
▌13. Christopher D. Sullivan (D)
▌14. Nathan D. Perlman (R)
▌15. Thomas J. Ryan (R)
▌16. W. Bourke Cockran (D), until March 1, 1923
▌17. Ogden L. Mills (R)
▌18. John F. Carew (D)
▌19. Walter M. Chandler (R)
▌20. Isaac Siegel (R)
▌21. Martin C. Ansorge (R)
▌22. Anthony J. Griffin (D)
▌23. Albert B. Rossdale (R)
▌24. Benjamin L. Fairchild (R)
▌25. James W. Husted (R)
▌26. Hamilton Fish III (R)
▌27. Charles B. Ward (R)
▌28. Peter G. Ten Eyck (D)
▌29. James S. Parker (R)
▌30. Frank Crowther (R)
▌31. Bertrand H. Snell (R)
▌32. Luther W. Mott (R)
▌33. Homer P. Snyder (R)
▌34. John D. Clarke (R)
▌35. Walter W. Magee (R)
▌36. Norman J. Gould (R)
▌37. Alanson B. Houghton (R), until February 28, 1922

▌Lewis Henry (R), from April 11, 1922

▌38. Thomas B. Dunn (R)
▌39. Archie D. Sanders (R)
▌40. S. Wallace Dempsey (R)
▌41. Clarence MacGregor (R)
▌42. James M. Mead (D)
▌43. Daniel A. Reed (R)

==== North Carolina ====
▌1. Hallett S. Ward (D)
▌2. Claude Kitchin (D)
▌3. Samuel M. Brinson (D), until April 13, 1922

▌Charles L. Abernethy (D), from November 7, 1922

▌4. Edward W. Pou (D)
▌5. Charles M. Stedman (D)
▌6. Homer L. Lyon (D)
▌7. William C. Hammer (D)
▌8. Robert L. Doughton (D)
▌9. Alfred L. Bulwinkle (D)
▌10. Zebulon Weaver (D)

==== North Dakota ====
▌1. Olger B. Burtness (R)
▌2. George M. Young (R)
▌3. James H. Sinclair (R)

==== Ohio ====
▌1. Nicholas Longworth (R)
▌2. Ambrose E. B. Stephens (R)
▌3. Roy G. Fitzgerald (R)
▌4. John L. Cable (R)
▌5. Charles J. Thompson (R)
▌6. Charles C. Kearns (R)
▌7. Simeon D. Fess (R)
▌8. R. Clinton Cole (R)
▌9. William W. Chalmers (R)
▌10. Israel M. Foster (R)
▌11. Edwin D. Ricketts (R)
▌12. John C. Speaks (R)
▌13. James T. Begg (R)
▌14. Charles L. Knight (R)
▌15. C. Ellis Moore (R)
▌16. Joseph H. Himes (R)
▌17. William M. Morgan (R)
▌18. B. Frank Murphy (R)
▌19. John G. Cooper (R)
▌20. Miner G. Norton (R)
▌21. Harry C. Gahn (R)
▌22. Theodore E. Burton (R)

==== Oklahoma ====
▌1. Thomas Alberter Chandler (R)
▌2. Alice M. Robertson (R)
▌3. Charles D. Carter (D)
▌4. Joseph C. Pringey (R)
▌5. Fletcher B. Swank (D)
▌6. Lorraine M. Gensman (R)
▌7. James V. McClintic (D)
▌8. Manuel Herrick (R)

==== Oregon ====
▌1. Willis C. Hawley (R)
▌2. Nicholas J. Sinnott (R)
▌3. Clifton N. McArthur (R)

==== Pennsylvania ====
▌1. William S. Vare (R), until January 2, 1923
▌2. George S. Graham (R)
▌3. Harry C. Ransley (R)
▌4. George W. Edmonds (R)
▌5. James J. Connolly (R)
▌6. George P. Darrow (R)
▌7. Thomas S. Butler (R)
▌8. Henry Winfield Watson (R)
▌9. William W. Griest (R)
▌10. Charles R. Connell (R), until September 26, 1922
▌11. Clarence D. Coughlin (R)
▌12. John Reber (R)
▌13. Fred B. Gernerd (R)
▌14. Louis T. McFadden (R)
▌15. Edgar R. Kiess (R)
▌16. I. Clinton Kline (R)
▌17. Benjamin K. Focht (R)
▌18. Aaron S. Kreider (R)
▌19. John M. Rose (R)
▌20. Edward S. Brooks (R)
▌21. Evan J. Jones (R)
▌22. Adam M. Wyant (R)
▌23. Samuel A. Kendall (R)
▌24. Henry W. Temple (R)
▌25. Milton W. Shreve (IR)
▌26. William H. Kirkpatrick (R)
▌27. Nathan L. Strong (R)
▌28. Harris J. Bixler (R)
▌29. Stephen G. Porter (R)
▌30. M. Clyde Kelly (R)
▌31. John M. Morin (R)
▌32. Guy E. Campbell (D)
▌At-large. William J. Burke (R)
▌At-large. Thomas S. Crago (R), from September 20, 1921
▌At-large. Joseph McLaughlin (R)
▌At-large. Anderson H. Walters (R)

==== Rhode Island ====
▌1. Clark Burdick (R)
▌2. Walter Russell Stiness (R)
▌3. Ambrose Kennedy (R)

==== South Carolina ====
▌1. W. Turner Logan (D)
▌2. James F. Byrnes (D)
▌3. Fred H. Dominick (D)
▌4. John J. McSwain (D)
▌5. William F. Stevenson (D)
▌6. Philip H. Stoll (D)
▌7. Hampton P. Fulmer (D)

==== South Dakota ====
▌1. Charles A. Christopherson (R)
▌2. Royal C. Johnson (R)
▌3. William Williamson (R)

==== Tennessee ====
▌1. B. Carroll Reece (R)
▌2. J. Will Taylor (R)
▌3. Joseph Edgar Brown (R)
▌4. Wynne F. Clouse (R)
▌5. Ewin L. Davis (D)
▌6. Joseph W. Byrns (D)
▌7. Lemuel P. Padgett (D), until August 2, 1922

▌Clarence W. Turner (D), from November 7, 1922

▌8. Lon A. Scott (R)
▌9. Finis J. Garrett (D)
▌10. Hubert Fisher (D)

==== Texas ====
▌1. Eugene Black (D)
▌2. John C. Box (D)
▌3. Morgan G. Sanders (D)
▌4. Sam Rayburn (D)
▌5. Hatton W. Sumners (D)
▌6. Rufus Hardy (D)
▌7. Clay Stone Briggs (D)
▌8. Daniel E. Garrett (D)
▌9. Joseph J. Mansfield (D)
▌10. James P. Buchanan (D)
▌11. Tom T. Connally (D)
▌12. Fritz G. Lanham (D)
▌13. Lucian W. Parrish (D), until March 27, 1922

▌Guinn Williams (D), from May 22, 1922

▌14. Harry M. Wurzbach (R)
▌15. John Nance Garner (D)
▌16. Claude B. Hudspeth (D)
▌17. Thomas L. Blanton (D)
▌18. John Marvin Jones (D)

==== Utah ====
▌1. Don B. Colton (R)
▌2. Elmer O. Leatherwood (R)

==== Vermont ====
▌1. Frank L. Greene (R)
▌2. Porter H. Dale (R)

==== Virginia ====
▌1. S. Otis Bland (D)
▌2. Joseph T. Deal (D)
▌3. Andrew Jackson Montague (D)
▌4. Patrick H. Drewry (D)
▌5. Rorer A. James (D), until August 6, 1921

▌James M. Hooker (D), from November 8, 1921

▌6. James P. Woods (D)
▌7. Thomas W. Harrison (D), until December 15, 1922

▌John Paul Jr. (R), from December 15, 1922

▌8. R. Walton Moore (D)
▌9. C. Bascom Slemp (R)
▌10. Henry D. Flood (D), until December 8, 1921

▌Henry St. George Tucker III (D), from March 21, 1922

==== Washington ====
▌1. John F. Miller (R)
▌2. Lindley H. Hadley (R)
▌3. Albert Johnson (R)
▌4. John W. Summers (R)
▌5. J. Stanley Webster (R)

==== West Virginia ====
▌1. Benjamin L. Rosenbloom (R)
▌2. George M. Bowers (R)
▌3. Stuart F. Reed (R)
▌4. Harry C. Woodyard (R)
▌5. Wells Goodykoontz (R)
▌6. Leonard S. Echols (R)

==== Wisconsin ====
▌1. Henry Allen Cooper (R)
▌2. Edward Voigt (R)
▌3. John M. Nelson (R)
▌4. John C. Kleczka (R)
▌5. William H. Stafford (R)
▌6. Florian Lampert (R)
▌7. Joseph D. Beck (R)
▌8. Edward E. Browne (R)
▌9. David G. Classon (R)
▌10. James A. Frear (R)
▌11. Adolphus P. Nelson (R)

==== Wyoming ====
▌At-large. Franklin W. Mondell (R)

==== Non-voting members ====
▌Alaska Territory. Daniel A. Sutherland (R)
▌Hawaii Territory. Jonah Kūhiō Kalanianaʻole (R), until January 7, 1922

▌Henry Baldwin (R), from March 25, 1922

▌Philippines At-large. Jaime C. de Veyra (Nac.)
▌Philippines At-large. Isauro Gabaldón (Nac.)
▌Puerto Rico. Félix Córdova Dávila

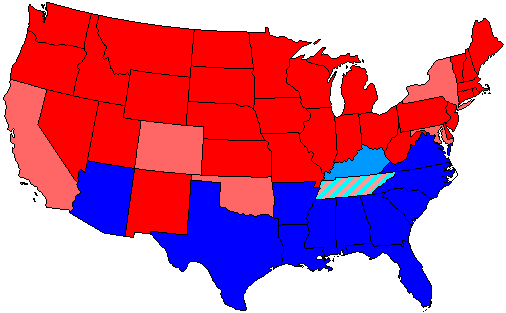
- / / 80+% Democratic; 60+% to 80% Republican / Up to 60% Republican

== Changes in membership ==
The count below reflects changes from the beginning of the first session of this Congress.

=== Senate ===
- Replacements: 11
  - Democratic: no net change
  - Republican: no net change
- Deaths: 4
- Resignations: 4
- Vacancy: 0
- Total seats with changes: 7

State	Senator	Reason for vacancy	Successor	Date of successor's installation
New Mexico (2)	Albert B. Fall (R)	Resigned March 4, 1921, after being appointed United States Secretary of the Interior. Successor was appointed and subsequently elected.	Holm O. Bursum (R)	March 11, 1921
Delaware (1)	Josiah O. Wolcott (D)	Resigned July 2, 1921, to accept an appointment to become Chancellor of the Delaware Court of Chancery. Successor was appointed.	T. Coleman du Pont (R)	July 7, 1921
Pennsylvania (1)	Philander C. Knox (R)	Died October 12, 1921. Successor was appointed.	William E. Crow (R)	October 24, 1921
Pennsylvania (3)	Boies Penrose (R)	Died December 31, 1921. Successor was appointed and subsequently elected.	George W. Pepper (R)	January 9, 1922
Iowa (2)	William S. Kenyon (R)	Resigned February 24, 1922, after being appointed to the United States Court of Appeals for the Eighth Circuit. Successor was appointed.	Charles A. Rawson (R)	February 24, 1922
Pennsylvania (1)	William E. Crow (R)	Died August 2, 1922. Successor was appointed and subsequently elected.	David A. Reed (R)	August 8, 1922
Georgia (3)	Thomas E. Watson (D)	Died September 26, 1922. Successor was appointed November 21, 1922, to serve one day until the elected successor took the seat.	Rebecca L. Felton (D)	October 3, 1922
Delaware (1)	T. Coleman du Pont (R)	Successor was elected.	Thomas F. Bayard Jr. (D)	November 8, 1922
Iowa (2)	Charles A. Rawson (R)	Successor was elected.	Smith W. Brookhart (R)	November 8, 1922
Michigan (2)	Truman H. Newberry (R)	Resigned November 18, 1922. Successor was appointed.	James J. Couzens (R)	November 29, 1922
Georgia (3)	Rebecca L. Felton (D)	Successor was elected.	Walter F. George (D)	November 22, 1922

=== House of Representatives ===
- Replacements: 19
  - Democratic: no net change
  - Republican: no net change
- Deaths: 18
- Resignations: 8
- Contested elections: 1
- Total seats with changes: 30

District	Vacated by	Reason for vacancy	Successor	Date of successor's installation
California 9th	Vacant	Rep.-elect Charles F. Van de Water died during previous congress	Walter F. Lineberger (R)	April 11, 1921
Alabama 4th	Vacant	Rep. Fred L. Blackmon died during previous congress	Lamar Jeffers (D)	June 7, 1921
Pennsylvania At-large	Vacant	Rep. Mahlon M. Garland died during previous congress	Thomas S. Crago (R)	September 20, 1921
Michigan 3rd	William H. Frankhauser (R)	Died May 9, 1921	John M. C. Smith (R)	June 28, 1921
Iowa 5th	James W. Good (R)	Resigned June 15, 1921	Cyrenus Cole (R)	July 19, 1921
Illinois At-large	William E. Mason (R)	Died June 16, 1921	Winnifred S. M. Huck (R)	November 7, 1922
Massachusetts 6th	Willfred W. Lufkin (R)	Resigned June 30, 1921, after being appointed Collector of Customs for the Port of Boston	A. Piatt Andrew (R)	September 27, 1921
Virginia 5th	Rorer A. James (D)	Died August 6, 1921	J. Murray Hooker (D)	November 8, 1921
Arkansas 6th	Samuel M. Taylor (D)	Died September 13, 1921	Chester W. Taylor (D)	October 25, 1921
Virginia 10th	Henry D. Flood (D)	Died December 8, 1921	Henry St. George Tucker III (D)	March 21, 1922
California 6th	John A. Elston (R)	Died December 15, 1921	James H. MacLafferty (R)	November 7, 1922
Maine 3rd	John A. Peters (R)	Resigned January 2, 1922, after being appointed judge for the United States District Court for the District of Maine	John E. Nelson (R)	March 20, 1922
Hawaii Territory	Jonah Kūhiō Kalanianaʻole (R)	Died January 7, 1922	Harry Baldwin (R)	March 25, 1922
New York 37th	Alanson B. Houghton (R)	Resigned February 28, 1922, after being appointed United States Ambassador to Germany	Lewis Henry (R)	April 11, 1922
Texas 13th	Lucian W. Parrish (D)	Died March 27, 1922	Guinn Williams (D)	May 22, 1922
North Carolina 3rd	Samuel M. Brinson (D)	Died April 13, 1922	Charles L. Abernethy (D)	November 7, 1922
Nebraska 1st	C. Frank Reavis (R)	Resigned June 3, 1922, after being appointed special assistant to the United States Attorney General	Roy H. Thorpe (R)	November 7, 1922
Nebraska 6th	Moses Kinkaid (R)	Died July 6, 1922	Augustin R. Humphrey (R)	November 7, 1922
Massachusetts 16th	Joseph Walsh (R)	Resigned August 2, 1922, after being appointed a justice of the superior court of Massachusetts	Charles L. Gifford (R)	November 7, 1922
Tennessee 7th	Lemuel P. Padgett (D)	Died August 2, 1922	Clarence W. Turner (D)	November 7, 1922
Pennsylvania 10th	Charles R. Connell (R)	Died September 26, 1922	Seat remained vacant until next Congress	
California 5th	John I. Nolan (R)	Died November 18, 1922	Mae Nolan (R)	January 23, 1923
Illinois 2nd	James R. Mann (R)	Died November 30, 1922	Seat remained vacant until next Congress	
Missouri 1st	Frank C. Millspaugh (R)	Resigned December 5, 1922	Seat remained vacant until next Congress	
Virginia 7th	Thomas W. Harrison (D)	Lost contested election December 15, 1922	John Paul Jr. (R)	December 15, 1922
New Mexico At-large	Néstor Montoya (R)	Died January 13, 1923	Seat remained vacant until next Congress	
Pennsylvania 1st	William S. Vare (R)	Resigned January 2, 1923	Seat remained vacant until next Congress	
New Hampshire 1st	Sherman E. Burroughs (R)	Died January 27, 1923	Seat remained vacant until next Congress	
California 10th	Henry Z. Osborne (R)	Died February 8, 1923	Seat remained vacant until next Congress	
New York 16th	Bourke Cockran (D)	Died March 1, 1923	Seat remained vacant until next Congress	

== Committees ==
Lists of committees and their party leaders for members of the House and Senate committees can be found through the Official Congressional Directory at the bottom of this article. The directory after the pages of terms of service lists committees of the Senate, House (Standing with Subcommittees, Select and Special) and Joint and, after that, House/Senate committee assignments. On the committees section of the House and Senate in the Official Congressional Directory, the committee's members on the first row on the left side shows the chairman of the committee and on the right side shows the ranking member of the committee.

=== Senate ===
- Additional Accommodations for the Library of Congress (Select)
- Agriculture and Forestry (Chairman: George W. Norris; Ranking Member: Ellison D. Smith)
- Appropriations (Chairman: Francis E. Warren; Ranking Member: Lee S. Overman)
- Audit and Control the Contingent Expenses of the Senate (Chairman: William M. Calder; Ranking Member: Andrieus A. Jones)
- Banking and Currency (Chairman: George P. McLean; Ranking Member: Robert L. Owen)
- Canadian Relations (Chairman: Frederick Hale)
- Census (Chairman: Howard Sutherland; Ranking Member: Joseph T. Robinson)
- Civil Service (Chairman: Thomas Sterling; Ranking Member: Kenneth McKellar)
- Civil Service Commission Examining Division (Select)
- Claims (Chairman: Arthur Capper; Ranking Member: Joseph T. Robinson)
- Coast and Insular Survey (Chairman: Walter Evans Edge)
- Coast Defenses (Chairman: Joseph S. Frelinghuysen)
- Commerce (Chairman: Wesley L. Jones; Ranking Member: Duncan U. Fletcher)
- Conservation of National Resources (Chairman: LeBaron B. Colt)
- Corporations Organized in the District of Columbia (Chairman: Atlee Pomerene)
- Crop Insurance (Select)
- Cuban Relations (Chairman: Hiram W. Johnson)
- Disposition of Useless Papers in the Executive Departments (Chairman: N/A; Ranking Member: N/A)
- District of Columbia (Chairman: L. Heisler Ball; Ranking Member: Atlee Pomerene)
- Education and Labor (Chairman: William S. Kenyon then William E. Borah; Ranking Member: Andrieus A. Jones)
- Engrossed Bills (Chairman: N/A; Ranking Member: N/A)
- Enrolled Bills (Chairman: Howard Sutherland; Ranking Member: Nathaniel B. Dial)
- Establish a university in the United States (Select)
- Examine the Several Branches in the Civil Service (Select)
- Execution without Trial in France (Special)
- Expenditures in the Department of Labor (Chairman: N/A; Ranking Member: N/A)
- Expenditures in the Post Office Department (Chairman: N/A; Ranking Member: N/A)
- Expenditures in Executive Departments (Chairman: Medill McCormick; Ranking Member: Oscar W. Underwood)
- Ex-servicemen Bureaus and Agencies (Select)
- Finance (Chairman: Porter J. McCumber; Ranking Member: Furnifold M. Simmons)
- Fisheries (Chairman: N/A; Ranking Member: N/A)
- Five Civilized Tribes of Indians
- Foreign Relations (Chairman: Henry Cabot Lodge; Ranking Member: Gilbert M. Hitchcock)
- Forest Reservations and the Protection of Game
- Geological Survey
- Haiti and Santo Domingo
- Immigration (Chairman: LeBaron B. Colt; Ranking Member: William H. King)
- Indian Affairs (Chairman: Selden P. Spencer; Ranking Member: Henry F. Ashurst)
- Industrial Expositions (Chairman: N/A; Ranking Member: N/A)
- Interoceanic Canals (Chairman: William E. Borah; Ranking Member: Thomas J. Walsh)
- Interstate Commerce (Chairman: Albert B. Cummins; Ranking Member: Ellison D. Smith)
- Irrigation and Reclamation (Chairman: Charles L. McNary; Ranking Member: Morris Sheppard)
- Judiciary (Chairman: Knute Nelson; Ranking Member: Charles A. Culberson)
- Library (Chairman: Frank B. Brandegee; Ranking Member: John Sharp Williams)
- Manufactures (Chairman: Robert M. La Follette; Ranking Member: Ellison D. Smith)
- Military Affairs (Chairman: James W. Wadsworth Jr.; Ranking Member: Gilbert M. Hitchcock)
- Mines and Mining (Chairman: Miles Poindexter; Ranking Member: Thomas J. Walsh)
- Mississippi River and its Tributaries (Select)
- National Banks (Chairman: N/A; Ranking Member: N/A)
- Naval Affairs (Chairman: Carroll S. Page; Ranking Member: Claude A. Swanson)
- Nine Foot Channel from the Great Lakes to the Gulf (Select)
- Pacific Islands, Puerto Rico and the Virgin Islands (Chairman: N/A; Ranking Member: N/A)
- Patents (Chairman: Hiram W. Johnson; Ranking Member: Ellison D. Smith)
- Pensions (Chairman: Holm O. Bursum; Ranking Member: Thomas J. Walsh)
- Post Office and Post Roads (Chairman: Charles E. Townsend; Ranking Member: Kenneth McKellar)
- Printing (Chairman: George H. Moses; Ranking Member: Duncan U. Fletcher)
- Private Land Claims (Chairman: N/A; Ranking Member: N/A)
- Privileges and Elections (Chairman: William P. Dillingham; Ranking Member: Atlee Pomerene)
- Public Buildings and Grounds (Chairman: Bert M. Fernald; Ranking Member: James A. Reed)
- Public Health and National Quarantine (Chairman: Joseph I. France)
- Public Lands and Surveys (Chairman: Reed Smoot; Ranking Member: Henry L. Myers)
- Railroads (Chairman: Irvine L. Lenroot)
- Readjustment of Service Pay (Special)
- Reforestation (Select)
- Revision of the Laws (Chairman: Richard P. Ernst; Ranking Member: Nathaniel B. Dial)
- Revolutionary Claims (Chairman: N/A; Ranking Member: N/A)
- Rules (Chairman: Charles Curtis; Ranking Member: Lee S. Overman)
- Standards, Weights and Measures (Chairman: N/A; Ranking Member: N/A)
- Tariff Regulation (Select)
- Territories (Chairman: Harry S. New)
- Transportation and Sale of Meat Products (Select)
- Transportation Routes to the Seaboard
- Trespassers upon Indian Lands (Select)
- Veterans Bureau Investigation (Select)
- Whole
- Woman Suffrage (Chairman: N/A; Ranking Member: N/A)

=== House of Representatives ===
- Accounts (Chairman: Clifford Ireland; Ranking Member: Frank Park)
- Agriculture (Chairman: Gilbert N. Haugen; Ranking Member: Henderson M. Jacoway)
- Alcoholic Liquor Traffic (Chairman: Addison T. Smith; Ranking Member: William D. Upshaw)
- Appropriations (Chairman: Martin B. Madden; Ranking Member: Joseph W. Byrns)
- Banking and Currency (Chairman: Louis T. McFadden; Ranking Member: Otis Wingo)
- Census (Chairman: Isaac Siegel; Ranking Member: William W. Larsen)
- Claims (Chairman: George W. Edmonds; Ranking Member: Henry B. Steagall)
- Coinage, Weights and Measures (Chairman: Albert H. Vestal; Ranking Member: Samuel M. Brinson)
- Disposition of Executive Papers (Chairman: Merrill Moores; Ranking Member: Arthur B. Rouse)
- District of Columbia (Chairman: Benjamin K. Focht; Ranking Member: James P. Woods)
- Education (Chairman: Simeon D. Fess; Ranking Member: William B. Bankhead)
- Election of the President, Vice President and Representatives in Congress (Chairman: William E. Andrews; Ranking Member: William W. Rucker)
- Elections No.#1 (Chairman: Frederick W. Dallinger; Ranking Member: Claude Benton Hudspeth)
- Elections No.#2 (Chairman: Robert Luce; Ranking Member: Frank Park)
- Elections No.#3 (Chairman: Cassius C. Dowell; Ranking Member: Zebulon Weaver)
- Enrolled Bills (Chairman: Edwin D. Ricketts; Ranking Member: Ladislas Lazaro)
- Expenditures in the Agriculture Department (Chairman: Edward J. King; Ranking Member: Robert L. Doughton)
- Expenditures in the Commerce Department (Chairman: Frank Murphy; Ranking Member: Henry B. Steagall)
- Expenditures in the Interior Department (Chairman: Aaron S. Kreider; Ranking Member: Charles Hillyer Brand)
- Expenditures in the Justice Department (Chairman: Stuart F. Reed; Ranking Member: S. Otis Bland)
- Expenditures in the Labor Department (Chairman: Anderson H. Walters; Ranking Member: Riley J. Wilson)
- Expenditures in the Navy Department (Chairman: Leonard S. Echols; Ranking Member: Rufus Hardy)
- Expenditures in the Post Office Department (Chairman: Frederick N. Zihlman; Ranking Member: Benjamin G. Humphreys)
- Expenditures in the State Department (Chairman: Richard N. Elliott; Ranking Member: William W. Rucker)
- Expenditures in the Treasury Department (Chairman: Porter H. Dale; Ranking Member: R. Walton Moore)
- Expenditures in the War Department (Chairman: Royal C. Johnson; Ranking Member: Edward B. Almon)
- Expenditures on Public Buildings (Chairman: John S. Benham; Ranking Member: Zebulon Weaver)
- Flood Control (Chairman: William A. Rodenberg; Ranking Member: Benjamin G. Humphreys)
- Foreign Affairs (Chairman: Stephen G. Porter; Ranking Member: Henry D. Flood)
- Immigration and Naturalization (Chairman: Albert Johnson; Ranking Member: Adolph J. Sabath)
- Indian Affairs (Chairman: Homer P. Snyder; Ranking Member: Carl Hayden)
- Industrial Arts and Expositions (Chairman: Oscar E. Bland; Ranking Member: Fritz G. Lanham)
- Insular Affairs (Chairman: Horace M. Towner; Ranking Member: Finis J. Garrett)
- Interstate and Foreign Commerce (Chairman: Samuel E. Winslow; Ranking Member: Alben W. Barkley)
- Invalid Pensions (Chairman: Charles E. Fuller; Ranking Member: William W. Rucker)
- Irrigation of Arid Lands (Chairman: Moses P. Kinkaid; Ranking Member: Carl Hayden)
- Judiciary (Chairman: Andrew J. Volstead; Ranking Member: Robert Y. Thomas Jr.)
- Labor (Chairman: John I. Nolan; Ranking Member: Eugene Black)
- Library (Chairman: Norman J. Gould; Ranking Member: Frank Park)
- Merchant Marine and Fisheries (Chairman: William S. Greene; Ranking Member: Rufus Hardy)
- Mileage (Chairman: William S. Greene; Ranking Member: Stanley H. Kunz)
- Military Affairs (Chairman: Julius Kahn; Ranking Member: William J. Fields)
- Mines and Mining (Chairman: Marion E. Rhodes; Ranking Member: Otis Wingo)
- Naval Affairs (Chairman: Thomas S. Butler; Ranking Member: Lemuel P. Padgett)
- Patents (Chairman: Florian Lampert; Ranking Member: Ewin L. Davis)
- Pensions (Chairman: Harold Knutson; Ranking Member: William D. Upshaw)
- Post Office and Post Roads (Chairman: Halvor Steenerson; Ranking Member: Thomas M. Bell)
- Printing (Chairman: Edgar R. Kiess; Ranking Member: William F. Stevenson)
- Public Buildings and Grounds (Chairman: John W. Langley; Ranking Member: Frank Clark)
- Public Lands (Chairman: Nicholas J. Sinnott; Ranking Member: John E. Raker)
- Railways and Canals (Chairman: Loren E. Wheeler; Ranking Member: Thomas H. Cullen)
- Reform in the Civil Service (Chairman: Frederick R. Lehlbach; Ranking Member: Eugene Black)
- Revision of Laws (Chairman: Edward C. Little; Ranking Member: R. Walton Moore)
- Rivers and Harbors (Chairman: S. Wallace Dempsey; Ranking Member: H. Garland Dupre)
- Roads (Chairman: Thomas B. Dunn; Ranking Member: Robert L. Doughton)
- Rules (Chairman: Philip P. Campbell; Ranking Member: Edward W. Pou)
- Standards of Official Conduct
- Territories (Chairman: Charles F. Curry; Ranking Member: Zebulon Weaver)
- United States Shipping Board Operations (Select) (Chairman: Joseph Walsh)
- War Claims (Chairman: Bertrand H. Snell; Ranking Member: Frank Clark)
- Ways and Means (Chairman: Joseph W. Fordney; Ranking Member: Claude Kitchin)
- Woman Suffrage (Chairman: Wallace H. White Jr.; Ranking Member: John E. Raker)
- Whole

=== Joint committees ===
- Conditions of Indian Tribes (Special)
- Determine what Employment may be Furnished Federal Prisoners
- Disposition of (Useless) Executive Papers
- Fiscal Relations between the District of Columbia and the United States
- Investigating Naval Base Sites on San Francisco Bay (Chairman: Sen. L. Heisler Ball)
- The Library (Chairman: Sen. Frank B. Brandegee)
- Printing (Chairman: Sen. George H. Moses; Vice Chairman: Rep. Edgar R. Kiess)
- Postal Service
- Readjustment of Service Pay (Special)
- Reorganization
- Reorganization of the Administrative Branch of the Government (Chairman: Walter F. Brown)
- To Investigate the System of Shortime Rural Credits
- Three Hundredth Anniversary of the Landing of the Pilgrims (Chairman: Rep. Henry Cabot Lodge)

== Caucuses ==
- Democratic (House)
- Democratic (Senate)

== Officers ==
=== Legislative branch agency directors ===
- Architect of the Capitol: Elliott Woods
- Comptroller General of the United States: John R. McCarl, from July 1, 1921
- Librarian of Congress: Herbert Putnam
- Public Printer of the United States: Cornelius Ford, until 1921
  - George H. Carter, from 1921

=== Senate ===
- Secretary: George A. Sanderson
- Librarian: Walter P. Scott
- Sergeant at Arms: David S. Barry
- Chaplain: John J. Muir (Baptist)

=== House of Representatives ===
- Clerk: William T. Page
- Sergeant at Arms: Joseph G. Rodgers
- Doorkeeper: Bert W. Kennedy
- Postmaster: Frank W. Collier
- Clerk at the Speaker's Table: Lehr Fess
- Reading Clerks: Patrick Joseph Haltigan (D) and Alney E. Chaffee (R)
- Chaplain: Henry N. Couden (Universalist), until April 11, 1921
  - James S. Montgomery, (Methodist), from April 11, 1921

== See also ==
- 1920 United States elections (elections leading to this Congress)
  - 1920 United States presidential election
  - 1920 United States Senate elections
  - 1920 United States House of Representatives elections
- 1922 United States elections (elections during this Congress, leading to the next Congress)
  - 1922 United States Senate elections
  - 1922 United States House of Representatives elections
