= Andrew John Volstead House =

Historic house in Minnesota, United States

- U.S. National Register of Historic Places
- U.S. National Historic Landmark
- The Volstead House in 2019

- Location within Minnesota Location within the United States
- Interactive map showing the location of Andrew John Volstead House
- Location: 163 9th Avenue, Granite Falls, Minnesota
- Coordinates: 44°48′33″N 95°32′24″W
- Area: Less than one acre
- Built: 1878
- Architectural style: None specified
- NRHP reference No.: 74001046

Significant dates
- Added to NRHP: December 30, 1974
- Designated NHL: December 8, 1976

The Andrew John Volstead House is the historic house in Granite Falls, Minnesota, of ten-term United States Congressman Andrew Volstead (1859–1947). It is now managed as a museum and the organizational headquarters of the Granite Falls Historical Society. Volstead became nationally synonymous with Prohibition in 1919 when, as chairman of the House Judiciary Committee, he was obliged to author the Volstead Act, enabling enforcement of the recently ratified Eighteenth Amendment. Volstead was a moderate progressive who coauthored the Capper–Volstead Act in 1922, which legalized agricultural cooperatives.

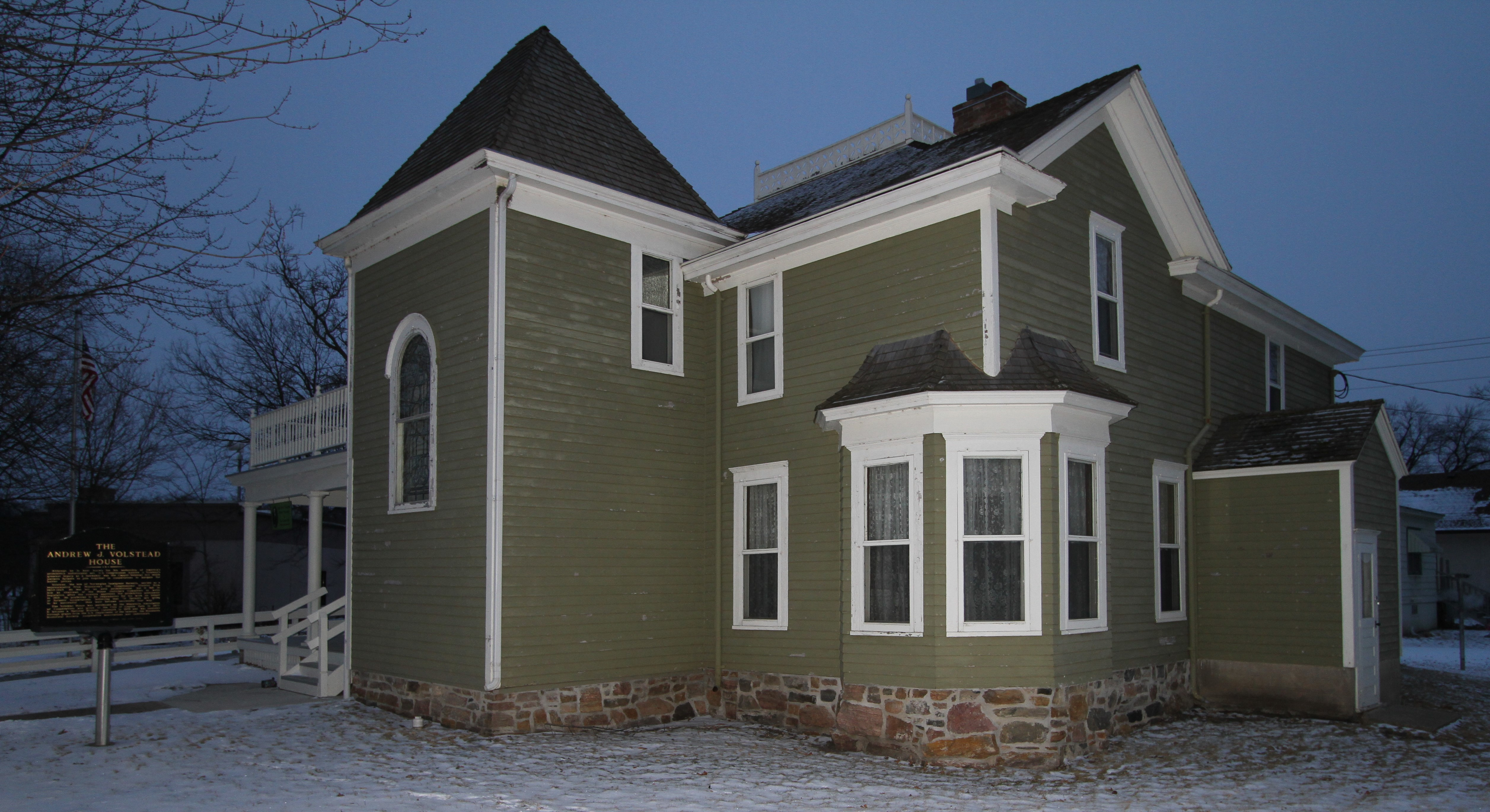
The house in 2018

The house was listed on the National Register of Historic Places in 1974 for having national significance in the areas of agriculture, politics/government, and social history. Two years later the house was declared a National Historical Landmark.

The 1878 home is a wood-frame structure with a large two-story stairwell tower that was added on by Volstead shortly after he purchased the property in 1894. During Volstead's time, the first floor had a large screened porch; this has now been replaced by an open porch. The interior is adorned with oak woodwork and stained glass. Volstead moved to a new home in Granite Falls in 1930. The first Volstead House remained privately owned until 1974, when it was listed on the National Register and converted into a historic house museum. Five years later it was donated to the city.

== See also ==
- List of National Historic Landmarks in Minnesota
- National Register of Historic Places listings in Yellow Medicine County, Minnesota
