= Latawnya, the Naughty Horse, Learns to Say "No" to Drugs =

Book by Sylvia Scott Gibson

- Author: Sylvia Scott Gibson
- Illustrator: Jeff Mayes
- Language: English
- Genre: Didactic children's literature
- Published: 1991 (Vantage Press)
- Publication place: United States
- Pages: vii, 35
- ISBN: 0-533-09102-0
- OCLC: 25855775
- LC Class: HV5825 .G52
- Followed by: Latawnya the Naughty Horse Two

Latawnya, the Naughty Horse, Learns to Say "No" to Drugs is a book by Sylvia Scott Gibson directed towards children, warning them about the dangers of alcohol and what the book refers to as "smoking drugs". It was published by Vantage Press with a copyright date of 1991. Due to its absurd writing, illustrations, and comments from the author, the book sells rapidly almost any time a copy becomes available on Amazon.com.

== Plot ==
The plot mainly deals with the title character, Latawnya, the youngest horse in her family. While out playing with her sisters Latoya and Daisy, they come across four other mares: Connie, Chrystal, Jackie, and Angie. They ask Latawnya if she wants to engage in "smoking games" and "drinking games". Latawnya realizes that they want to smoke drugs and drink alcohol, and she joins in. Her sisters catch her with the four "bad" horses and proceed to criticize her for "smoking drugs and drinking", something that their parents tell them not to do. Although Latawnya begs Latoya and Daisy not to tell their parents, they tell on her anyway, resulting in an uncomfortable confrontation with them, as they are disappointed in her experimenting with smoking drugs and drinking. After an intense lecture from her parents (including a scene wherein an old friend of the father horse suffers an overdose after engaging in smoking games and drinking games), Latawnya realizes the error of her ways and promises never to engage in "smoking games" and "drinking games" again.

== Sequel ==
In April 2010, a sequel entitled Latawnya the Naughty Horse Two was published. Gibson's daughters, Latawnya and Chrystal, wrote that they loved the book.

== Legal action ==
In August 2010, Gibson filed a pro se lawsuit against Amazon.com, Urban Dictionary, and Wikipedia. She objected to Amazon's sale of the book in "11 countries", citing the fact that it contains her legal name and the names of her family members. She also raised issue with Urban Dictionary selling merchandise featuring excerpts from the book and with Wikipedia's article on the book, which she claimed contained "discriminating and false statements" and illegally published the book's plot. The lawsuit was dismissed in September 2011.

== Bibliography ==
- Sylvia Scott Gibson and James E. Gibson (27 April 2010). Latawnya The Naughty Horse Two. ISBN 978-1-45601-473-5.
