= Lodge–Fish Resolution =

United States legislation

Lodge-Fish Resolution
- Long title: A joint resolution favoring the establishment in Palestine of a national home for the Jewish people.
- Enacted by: the 67th United States Congress
- Effective: September 21, 1922

Legislative history
- Introduced in the House as H.J. Res. 322 by Hamilton Fish III (R–NY) on May 3, 1922; Committee consideration by House Foreign Affairs; Passed the House on June 30, 1922; Passed the Senate on July 13, 1922 (unanimous consent) with amendment; House agreed to Senate amendment on September 11, 1922 (unanimous consent); Signed into law by President Warren G. Harding on September 21, 1922

The Lodge–Fish Resolution was a joint resolution of both houses of the US Congress that endorsed the British Mandate for Palestine. It was introduced in June 1922 by Hamilton Fish III, a Republican New York Representative, and Henry Cabot Lodge, a Republican Senator from Massachusetts.

It came about following a significant lobbying effort by the American Zionist community, particularly through the efforts of Zionist Rabbi Simon Glazer. There was support from several state governors, most notably Henry J. Allen of Kansas. Governor Allen referred the matter to Senator Charles Curtis (R-KS). Curtis reviewed the document, referred it to the State Department for review, and arranged for Rabbi Glazer to meet with him and President Harding to discuss the matter before coordinating sponsors for the resolution. For this work, Rabbi Glazer called Curtis "The Champion of Israel."

Opposition came from the State Department, a prominent anti-Zionist rabbi at the congressional hearings, and The New York Times, which was owned by the anti-Zionist Adolph Ochs.

On September 21, 1922, US President Warren G. Harding signed the joint resolution of approval to establish a Jewish National Home in Palestine, per the 1917 Balfour Declaration.

== Text ==
The full text is as follows:

"Favoring the establishment in Palestine of a national home for the Jewish people Resolved by the Senate and House of Representatives of the United States of America in Congress assembled. That the United States of America favors the establishment in Palestine of a national home for the Jewish people, it being clearly understood that nothing shall be done which should prejudice the civil and religious rights of Christian and all other non-Jewish communities in Palestine, and that the holy places and religious buildings and sites in Palestine shall be adequately protected." [italics in the original]

== Bibliography ==
- Brecher, Frank W. (1987). "Woodrow Wilson and the Origins of the Arab-Israeli Conflict". American Jewish Archives. 39 (1): 23–47.
- Glazer, Simon (1922). The Palestine Resolution: A Record of Its Origins. ISBN 978-1-01-795116-5. 9-20.
- Lebow, Richard Ned (1968). "Woodrow Wilson and the Balfour Declaration". The Journal of Modern History. 40 (4): 501–523. doi:10.1086/240237. JSTOR 1878450. S2CID 144175738.
- Medoff, Rafael (2002). Jewish Americans and Political Participation: A Reference Handbook. ABC-CLIO. ISBN 978-1-57607-314-8.
