= Andrew Volstead =

American politician (1860–1947)

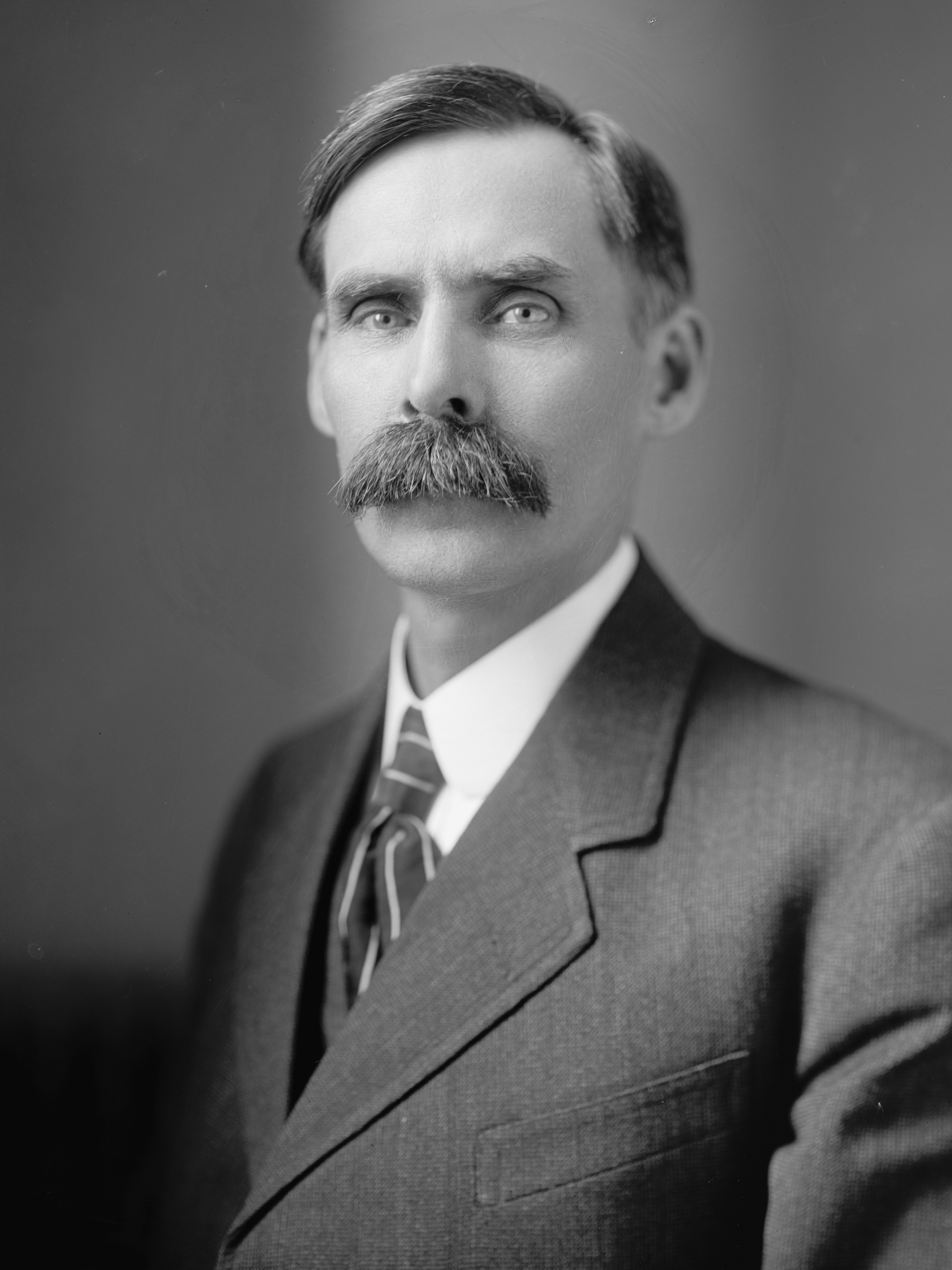

Member of the U.S. House of Representatives from Minnesota's 7th district
- In office March 4, 1903 – March 3, 1923
- Preceded by: Frank Eddy
- Succeeded by: Ole J. Kvale

Personal details
- Born: Andrew John Volstead; October 31, 1859 Kenyon, Minnesota, U.S.
- Died: January 20, 1947 (aged 87) Granite Falls, Minnesota, U.S.
- Resting place: Granite Falls Cemetery
- Party: Republican
- Profession: Law

Andrew John Volstead (/ˈvɒlstɛd/) (October 31, 1859 – January 20, 1947) was an American member of the United States House of Representatives from Minnesota, 1903–1923, and a member of the Republican Party. His name is closely associated with the National Prohibition Act of 1919, usually called the Volstead Act. The act was the enabling legislation for the enforcement of Prohibition in the United States beginning in 1920.

== Early life ==
Volstead was born in Kenyon, Goodhue County, Minnesota, to Norwegian-American parents Jon Einertson Vraalstad (John Vrolstad), a distant relative of Queen Sonja of Norway, and wife Dorothea Mathea Lillo. He was educated at St. Olaf College, became a lawyer and served as mayor of Granite Falls, Minnesota, from 1900 to 1902. According to his obituary in a 1947 edition of the Minneapolis Star, he first practiced law in Grantsburg, Wisconsin, before moving to Granite Falls in 1886.

== Congressional career ==
While in Congress, he served as chairman of the House Judiciary Committee from 1919 to 1923. Although often considered the author of the Volstead Act, he collaborated with Wayne Wheeler of the Anti-Saloon League, who conceived and largely drafted the bill. However, Volstead sponsored the bill and championed, promoted and facilitated its passage. He also helped author the Capper–Volstead Act, which enabled farmers to form locally owned cooperatives without fear of prosecution under the Sherman Antitrust Act. The law is still in effect.

Volstead was a member of the 58th, 59th, 60th, 61st, 62nd, 63rd, 64th, 65th, 66th, and 67th congresses. He was defeated in his attempt to be elected to an 11th term in 1922. Shortly thereafter he was hired as legal adviser to the chief of the National Prohibition Enforcement Bureau.

Upon repeal of Prohibition in 1933, Volstead returned to Granite Falls, Minnesota, where he resumed the private practice of law.

He died in 1947. Volstead's former home, located at 163 Ninth Avenue, Granite Falls, Minnesota, is a National Historic Landmark. He is buried in the city cemetery of Granite Falls.

== See also ==
- List of covers of Time magazine (1920s) – March 29, 1926
- Bootleggers and Baptists

== Notes ==
- United States Congress. "Andrew Volstead (id: V000114)". Biographical Directory of the United States Congress.

U.S. House of Representatives
Preceded by Frank Eddy	U.S. Representative from Minnesota's 7th congressional district 1903–1923	Succeeded by Ole J. Kvale
