= Hamilton Fish III =

American politician (1888–1991)

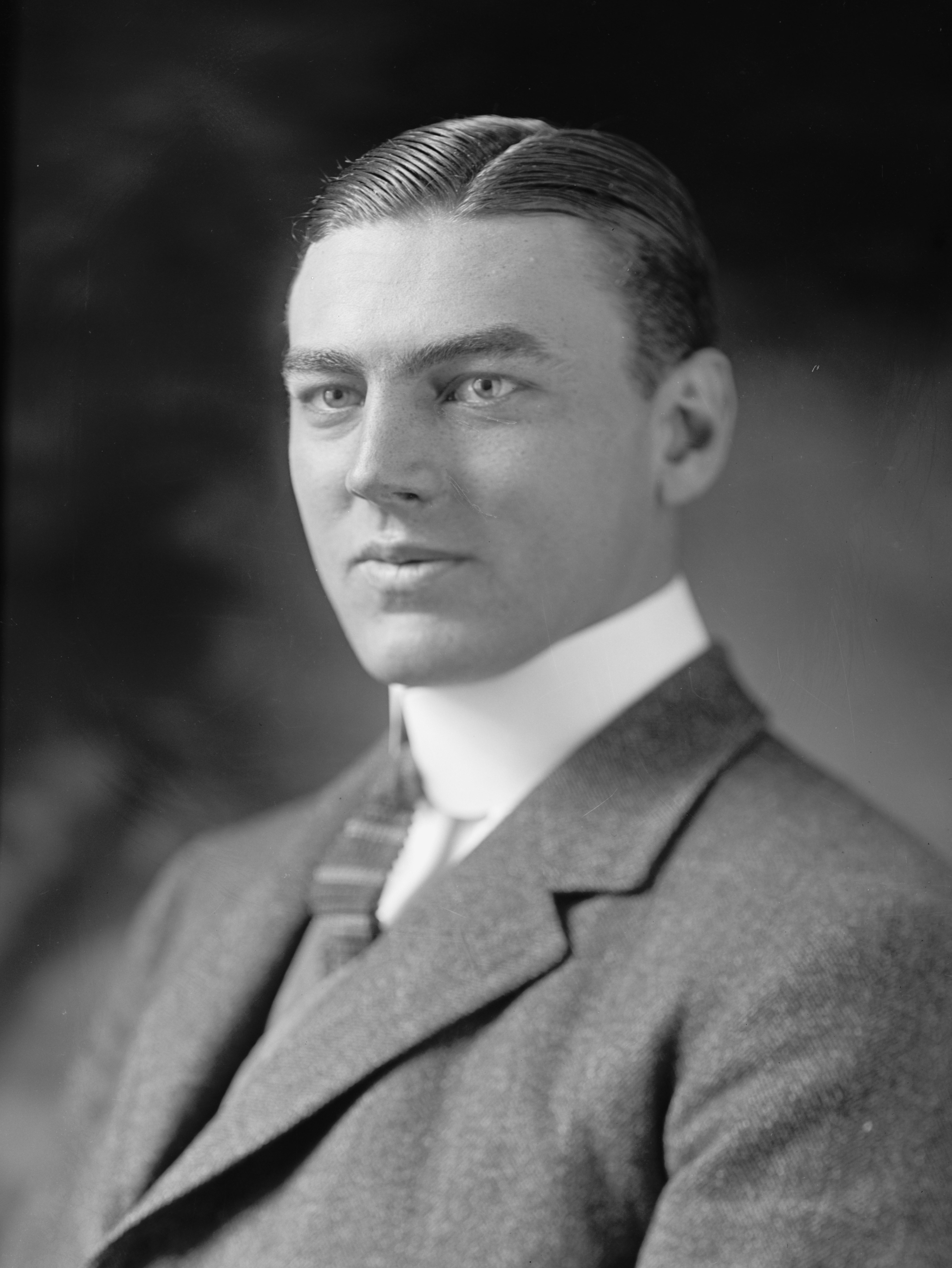
- Fish, 1905–1945

Member of the U.S. House of Representatives from New York's 26th district
- In office November 2, 1920 – January 3, 1945
- Preceded by: Edmund Platt
- Succeeded by: Peter A. Quinn

Member of the New York State Assembly from the Putnam district
- In office January 1, 1914 – December 31, 1916
- Preceded by: John R. Yale
- Succeeded by: John P. Donohoe

Personal details
- Born: Hamilton Stuyvesant Fish; December 7, 1888 Garrison, New York, U.S.
- Died: January 18, 1991 (aged 102) Cold Spring, New York, U.S.
- Party: Republican
- Other political affiliations: Progressive "Bull Moose" (1912–16)
- Spouses: Grace Chapin Rogers (m. 1920; died 1960) Marie Blackton (m. 1967; died 1974) Alice Desmond (m. 1976; div. 1984) Lydia Ambrogio (m. 1988)
- Children: Hamilton Fish IV; Lillian Veronica Fish; Elizabeth Fish
- Parent(s): Hamilton Fish II; Emily Mann
- Relatives: Fish family
- Education: Harvard University (BA)

Military service
- Allegiance: United States
- Branch/service: United States Army
- Years of service: 1917–1919 (Army); 1920-1948 (Reserve)
- Rank: Major (Army); Colonel (Reserve)
- Commands: Company K, 369th Infantry, 93d Division
- Battles/wars: World War I: Champagne-Marne; Meuse-Argonne; Defensive Sector
- Awards: Silver Star; War Cross 1914–1918 (France)
- Fish's voice Fish speaks in support of declaring war on Japan; Recorded December 8, 1941

Hamilton Fish III (born Hamilton Stuyvesant Fish and also known as Hamilton Fish Jr.; December 7, 1888 – January 18, 1991) was an American soldier, author, politician and prominent isolationist from New York. He represented New York's 26th congressional district in the Hudson Valley region in the United States House of Representatives from 1920 to 1945. In the second half of his House career, Fish was a chief critic and opponent of President Franklin D. Roosevelt, especially on matters of international affairs and American entry into World War II prior to the attack on Pearl Harbor.

Born into a political family whose legacy dated to the Dutch settlement of New Amsterdam, Fish was educated at St. Mark's School and Harvard College, where he graduated at the age of 20 before enrolling at Harvard Law School. He was elected to the New York State Assembly from Putnam County in 1913 as a member of the Progressive Party. He served three terms before enlisting in World War I, in which he commanded a company of the 369th Infantry Regiment, a unit of African-American soldiers known as the "Harlem Hellfighters." After the war, Fish was elected to the United States House as a Republican. In the House, he advocated for veterans and the anti-lynching movement. He became the body's leading anti-communist as chair of the Fish Committee, a special body established in 1930 to investigate Soviet and communist influence in the United States. He also sponsored the Lodge–Fish Resolution, expressing American support for the British establishment of a Jewish state in Palestine.

In 1932, Fish crossed party lines to privately support Hudson Valley native Franklin D. Roosevelt for president, but he soon became a leading critic of Roosevelt's New Deal legislation and Atlanticist foreign policy. Throughout the 1930s, Fish was the subject of multiple foreign influence campaigns, since he was identified by Nazi Party officials as a natural ally to their international ambitions (though he was on the record criticizing the treatment of Jews in Germany) and by British security organizations as an obstacle to American aid for Great Britain. His chief of staff, George Hill, was convicted of perjury in relation to his involvement with George Sylvester Viereck, and agents of the British Security Co-ordination office repeatedly raised money for Fish's opponents and published anti-Fish leaflets in his district. In 1941, Fish was implicated in an America First Committee franking controversy leading to William Power Maloney's grand jury investigating Nazi penetration in the United States.

After the 1941 Japanese attack on Pearl Harbor and German declaration of war, Fish called for unified support for Roosevelt as a wartime president. He delivered the first speech calling for a declaration of war against Japan and sought to re-enlist but was denied a commission by Roosevelt; he later returned to his criticism, arguing that Roosevelt should have prevented the Japanese strike. Like many leading isolationists, Fish's popularity waned during wartime, and he was defeated for re-election in 1944. Late in the decade, former United States Department of Justice prosecutor O. John Rogge accused Fish of Nazi sympathies. He continued to actively comment on American diplomacy and military strategy during and after the Cold War, criticizing the United Nations, John Foster Dulles, and the Vietnam War while supporting NATO, the American invasions of Grenada and Panama, and the Gulf War.

== Family and early life ==
Hamilton Stuyvesant Fish was born on December 7, 1888, in Garrison, New York to Hamilton Fish II and the former Emily Mann. Hamilton Fish II had been a Republican member of the New York Assembly and would later serve as Speaker of the Assembly and a United States Representative. Hamilton Fish, the paternal grandfather of this article's subject, was United States Secretary of State under President Ulysses S. Grant.

In 1898, the young Fish's cousin, also named Hamilton Fish and a volunteer in Theodore Roosevelt's Rough Riders, was the first American soldier killed in action in the Spanish–American War. In his honor, Fish's father legally changed his ten-year-old son's name from Hamilton Stuyvesant Fish to just Hamilton Fish.

During his childhood, Fish attended Chateau de Lancy near Geneva, which his father had also attended. The younger Fish learned French, played soccer, and spent summers with his family in Bavaria. He returned to the United States to attend the Fay School in Southborough, Massachusetts and St. Mark's School, a preparatory school also in Southborough. In his memoirs, Fish described himself as a "B student" at St. Mark's but successful in several different sports.

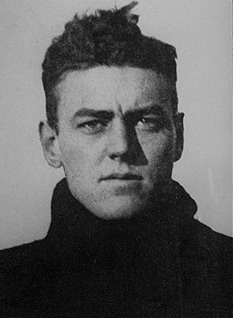
At Harvard, Fish was a star football player and was later inducted into the College Football Hall of Fame.

Fish graduated from St. Mark's in 1906 and attended Harvard College, where he graduated in the class of 1910. He was a member of the Porcellian Club and played tackle for Harvard's football team. Standing 6 feet 4 inches (1.93 m) and weighing 200 pounds (91 kg), "Ham" Fish was highly successful as a football player; he was twice an All-America and was inducted into the College Football Hall of Fame in 1954. He was the only Harvard man on Yale graduate Walter Camp's all-time All-American team. After graduating, Fish continued his involvement in football. He donated $5,000.00 for several awards to Harvard football players and organized the Harvard Law School football team, which played exhibition games with other colleges around the country. During his time at Harvard, Fish became friends with Theodore Roosevelt Jr., the son of President Theodore Roosevelt.

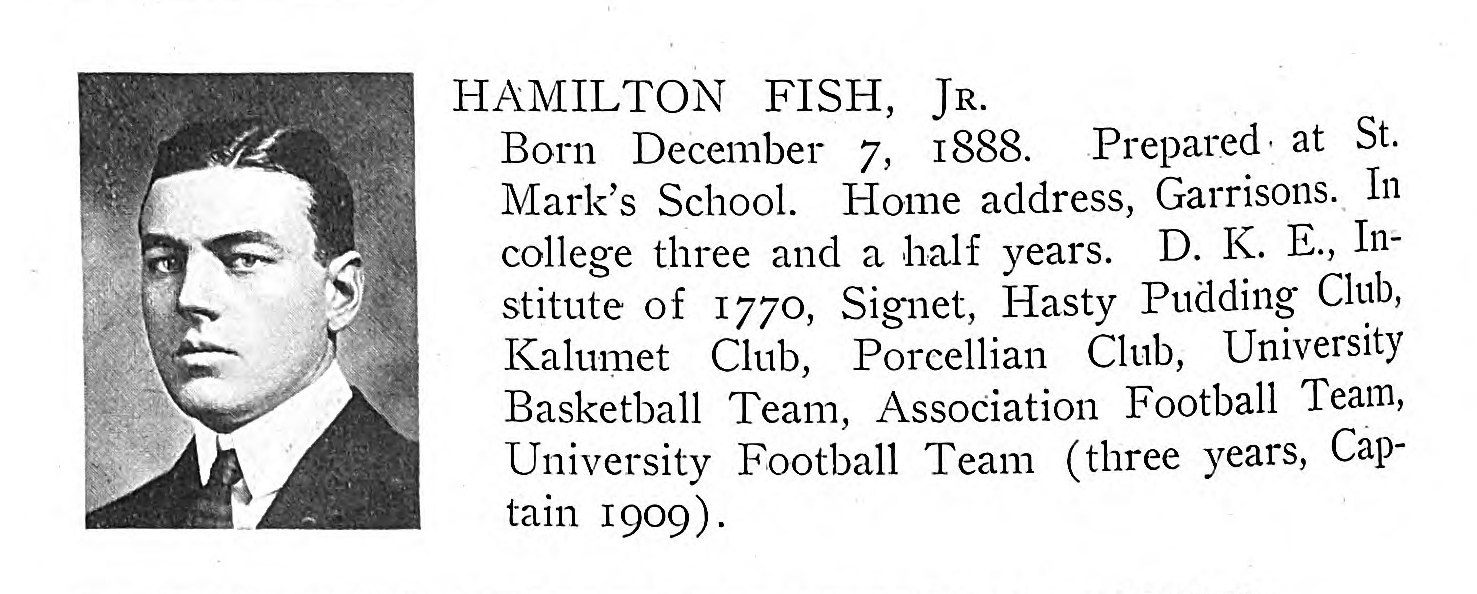
Fish in the Harvard College yearbook, 1910

In 1909, at 20, Fish graduated early from Harvard with a cum laude degree in history and government. He declined an offer to teach history at Harvard and instead attended Harvard Law School. He left law school before graduating, and took a job in a New York City insurance office.

=== New York State Assembly (1914–16) ===
Since Fish's father had served as Assistant Treasurer of the United States in Theodore Roosevelt's administration, and Fish himself had befriended Roosevelt's son at Harvard, he actively supported Roosevelt in the 1912 primaries against President William Howard Taft. Fish attended the 1912 Republican National Convention with his father and was dismayed when Taft was nominated despite popular support for Roosevelt. Fish joined Roosevelt in bolting the Republican Party and, with assistance from his father, he was appointed chair of the Putnam County Bull Moose Party. They campaigned for Roosevelt in the general election but, despite Roosevelt's defeat, Fish remained a committed Progressive.

In 1913, Fish ran for Assembly against Republican county political boss John Yale, whom Fish later remembered as "thoroughly corrupt." In a largely rural county facing challenges from industrialization and modernization, Fish's message of limiting private influence in government without limiting the exercise of private liberties was popular. Yale ultimately withdrew from the Assembly race in favor of a political ally, whom Fish easily defeated running on an anti-corruption platform. As a progressive, Fish enjoyed the support of former President Roosevelt and a friendly relationship with Roosevelt's distant cousin Franklin Delano Roosevelt, a State Senator and resident of Hyde Park in neighboring Dutchess County. Before Fish's election, Fish and Senator Roosevelt collaborated on a plan to establish direct primary elections in 1912. The two men would continue cordial relations for the next two decades; after Franklin left Albany to become Assistant Secretary of the Navy, he continued to assist Fish with patronage requests and securing federal contracts for his insurance firm, the John Paige Insurance Company.

As an Assemblyman for three terms, Fish championed progressive social and political reforms, including the reform of the New York state primary election system, a widow's pension, penal reforms, and workmen's compensation. With support from Theodore Roosevelt, Fish opposed a bill which would allow insurance companies to bypass the workmen's compensation scheme to settle claims and attacked the Speaker of the Assembly, Thaddeus Sweet, for misuse of public funds and hiring political allies for no-show jobs. Though Fish never substantiated his allegations, he won public applause.

== Military service ==
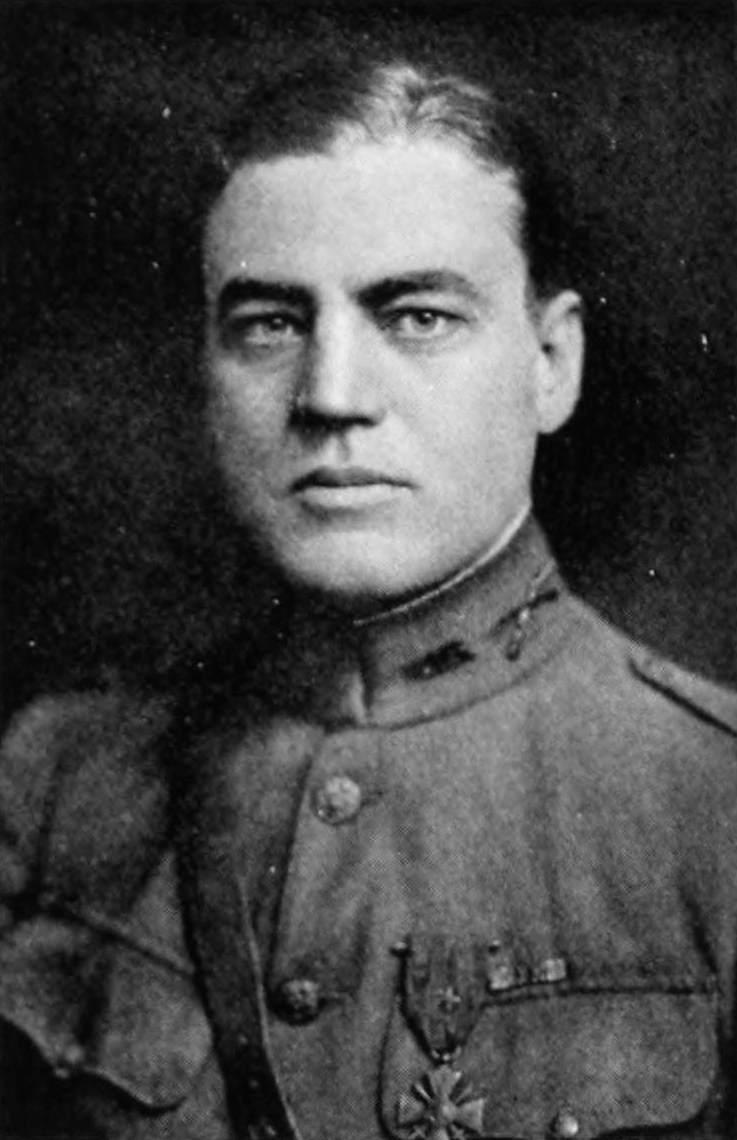
In the First World War, Fish was decorated with the Silver Star and Croix de Guerre as captain of the 369th Infantry Regiment.

Prior to the United States entering the First World War, Fish was captain of Company K, 15th New York Infantry. When the 15th was mobilized for Federal service, Fish accepted an offer from Col. William Hayward to retain his position in the 369th Infantry (as the 15th New York was re-designated following mobilization). The 369th was a unit of African American enlisted men with white officers (and a few African American officers at the start of the war) which came to be known as the "Harlem Hellfighters." The 369th Infantry was assigned to the 93d Division.

The summer after President Wilson's declaration of war against Germany (in April 1917), Fish and about two thousand soldiers began training at Camp Whitman (in New York). In October 1917, the unit was ordered to Camp Wadsworth (in South Carolina) for further training. In November 1917, the regiment boarded the USS Pocahontas, destined for France, although shortly thereafter the ship returned to shore due to engine problems. After another aborted departure, the ship left on December 13, 1917. Despite colliding with another ship and not having a destroyer escort to protect against German submarines, the regiment reached France. (Fish complained to Assistant Secretary of the Navy Franklin D. Roosevelt about the lack of an escort.)

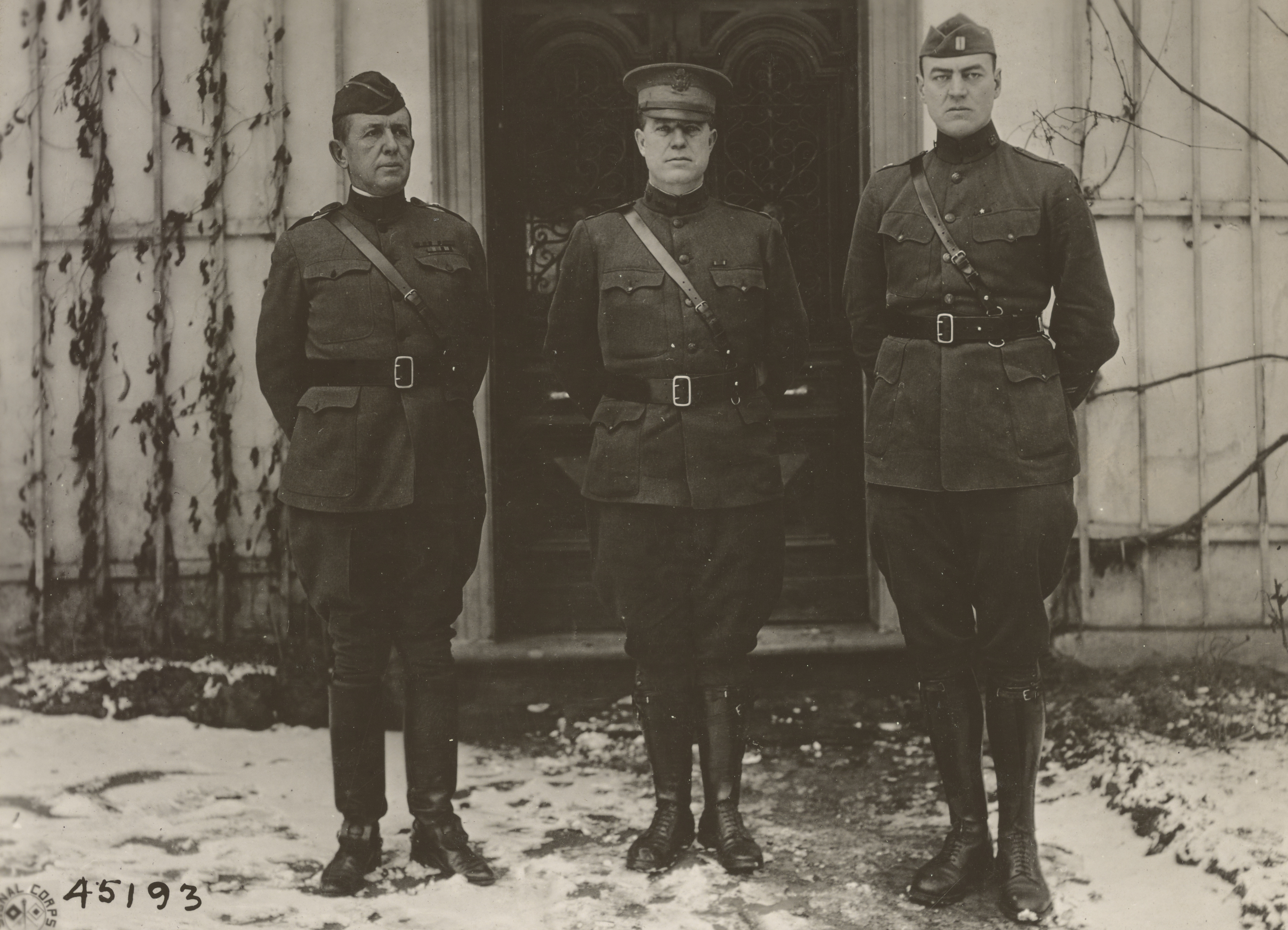
Fish (right) with senior officers of the 4th Division in Germany during the occupation of the Rhineland, December 1918.

Fish and his unit landed in Brest on December 26 and were placed under the control of the French army by U.S. General John J. Pershing. Altogether, the 369th Infantry spent 191 days on the front lines, the longest of any American regiment. It was also the first Allied regiment to reach the Rhine River. Fish received the Silver Star and the French War Cross 1914–1918. In addition, Fish and his sister Janet, who had been a nurse near the front lines, were both later inducted into the French Legion of Honor for their wartime service.

Fish was promoted to major on March 13, 1919. He returned to the United States on April 25 and was discharged on May 14. He continued as a member of the Organized Reserve Corps until 1948, and attained the rank of colonel.

Fish later credited his service with the 369th Infantry for his long support for civil rights in Congress. In 1922, 1937, and 1940, Fish joined with other Republicans and northern Democrats to pass anti-lynching bills, each of which was defeated in the Senate. During debate on the Military Appropriations Bill of 1941, Fish succeeded in adding an amendment to ban racial discrimination in the selection and training of military personnel, which was credited as an important step leading to desegregation of the military. Fish continued to advocate for the equal treatment of Black servicemen throughout World War II, remarking in 1944, "Fourteen millions of loyal Americans have the right to expect that in a war for the advancement of the 'Four Freedoms,' their sons be given the same right as any other American to train, to serve, and to fight in combat units in defense of the United States in this greatest war in its history."

== U.S. House of Representatives (1920–45) ==
Fish represented the Hudson Valley in the U.S. House from November 2, 1920, until January 3, 1945, after he was defeated running for what would have been his thirteenth term in office.

In nearly 25 years as a Representative, Fish would become known as a strong anticommunist and eventually an acerbic critic of his former ally and constituent, President Franklin Roosevelt, and Roosevelt's New Deal, although he privately supported Roosevelt in 1932 and urged his wife to vote for him. His unapologetic opposition to the New Deal provoked Roosevelt to include him with two other Capitol Hill opponents in a rollicking taunt that became a staple of Roosevelt's 1940 re-election campaign: "Martin, Barton and Fish."

Finally, in part under the influence of New York Governor Thomas Dewey, Fish's congressional career ended when he won the Republican Party primary in his district but lost the general election in 1944.

=== Early House career ===
In 1919, Fish returned home to become a founding member of the new American Legion. He was named chair of the three-member committee which wrote the preamble to the Legion's constitution and selected two other Roosevelt supporters as its other members. Though the three men collaborated on drafting, Fish later insisted he was primarily responsible for the preamble, which was a reflection of Rooseveltian nationalism. In November 1919, Fish attended the first American Legion convention in Minneapolis and backed the Roosevelt wing of the organization in its successful bid for control.

==== 1920 election ====
After the American Legion convention, Fish returned to Garrison to plan his political future. He announced on April 15, 1920, that he would challenge incumbent United States Representative Edmund Platt in the Republican primary. Platt soon opted not to run for re-election and ultimately resigned in July to join the Federal Reserve Board of Governors. Despite this, Fish faced a fight for the Republican nomination. Putnam County, his political base, was the smallest of the three counties in the district, and Republican organizations in the other counties endorsed their own candidates. Fish instead appealed directly to voters on a fourteen-point platform which blended progressive domestic policy, opposition to internationalism, and reactionary nativism, including "restriction of immigration based on [a] character test" and "drastic action" against "Anarchists, I.W.Ws, Communists and ultra Socialists." Despite opposition from the party establishment, Fish enjoyed high name recognition from his and his father's time in office and support from veterans, the state Federation of Labor, and Black voters. He won the primary handily despite losing Dutchess County by 4,000 votes and very easily defeated Rosslyn Cox, the mayor of Middletown, in the general election. After his victory, Fish received congratulations from Franklin Roosevelt, who had been defeated as the Democratic nominee for vice president in the concurrent 1920 election. Roosevelt wrote,

"In view of the fact that you and I are still Progressives I feel that I can very properly congratulate you on your election as my Representative. You will have a powerful opportunity to be of great service... in keeping the old-line Reactionaries... from going to such extremes as some of them are even now proposing."

==== Tomb of the Unknown Soldier ====
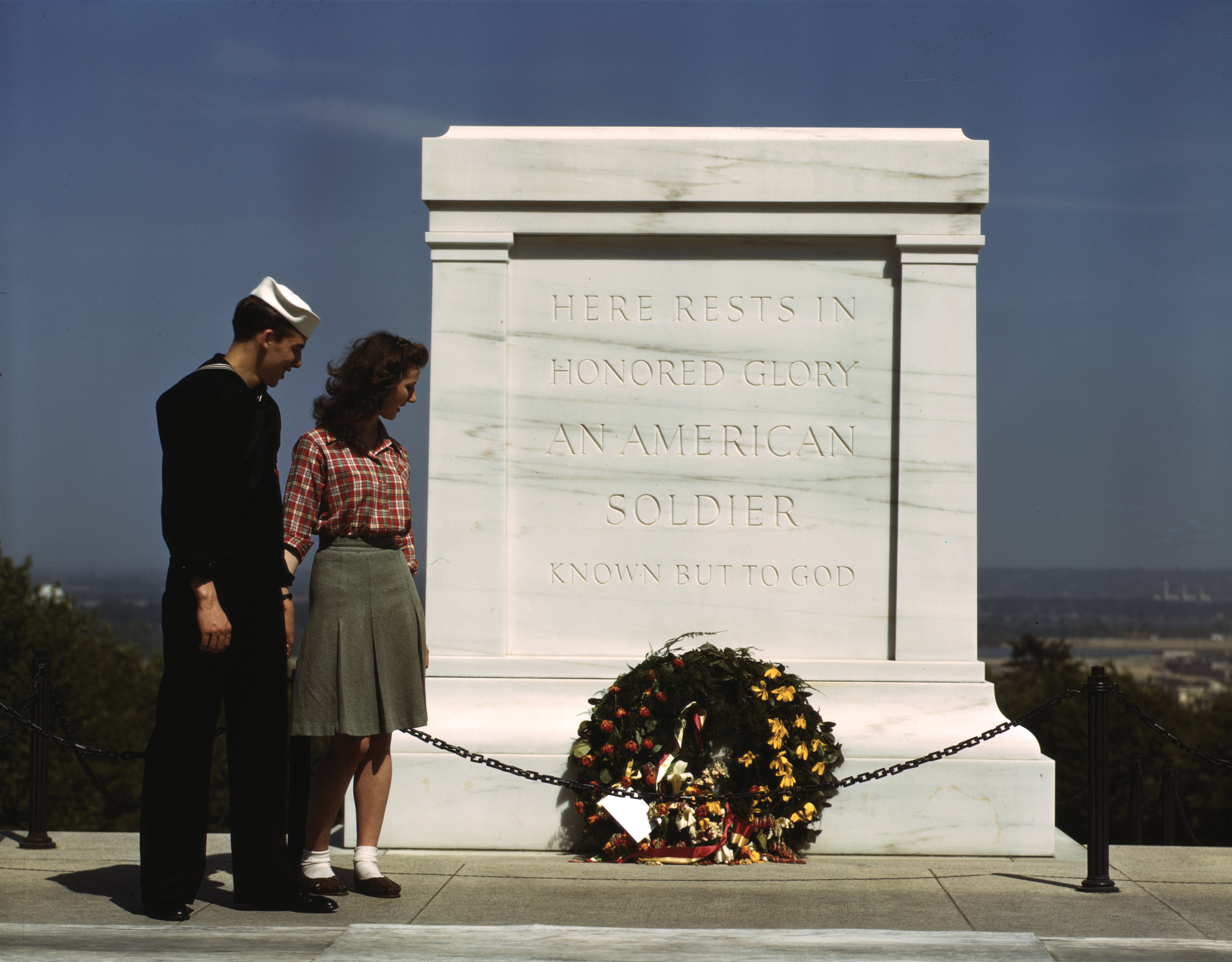
As a freshman House member, Fish introduced a resolution establishing the Tomb of the Unknown Soldier.

Upon entering the House, the young Fish was the only veteran of World War I in Congress. On December 21, 1920, he introduced a resolution instituting Veterans Day as a national holiday. Fish also introduced House Resolution 67 of the 66th Congress, which provided for the interment of the remains of an unknown American soldier in a hallowed tomb to be constructed outside the Memorial Amphitheater in Arlington National Cemetery. Congress approved the resolution unanimously on March 4, 1921. The tomb, completed in 1937 with Fish's input, came to be known as the Tomb of the Unknown Soldier.

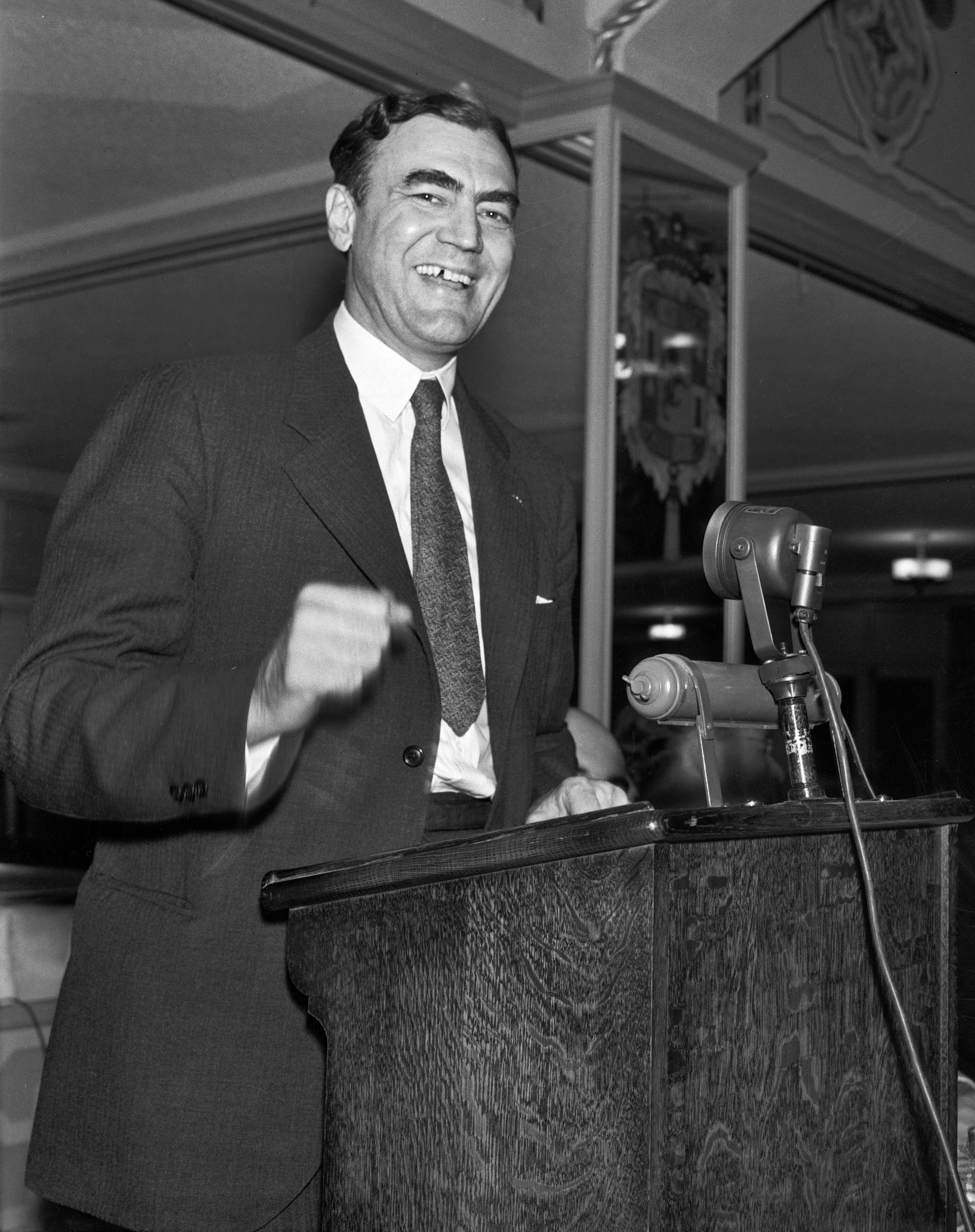
Fish, pictured here delivering a speech against the New Deal in 1935, became a leading critic of Franklin D. Roosevelt.

=== Fish Committee and opposition to Roosevelt ===
Fish was a fervent anticommunist; in a 1931 article titled The Menace of Communism, he described communism as "the most important, the most vital, the most far-reaching, and the most dangerous issue in the world" and believed that there was extensive communist influence in the United States.

On May 5, 1930, he introduced House Resolution 180, which proposed to establish a committee to investigate communist activities in the United States; the resulting committee, commonly known as the Fish Committee, undertook extensive investigations of people and organizations suspected of being involved with or supporting communist activities in the United States. Among those who testified before the committee were Communist Party USA chair William Z. Foster and Roger Nash Baldwin, founder and director of the American Civil Liberties Union.

On January 17, 1931, the committee issued its final report, authored by Fish. Though Fish had earlier promised that the committee would request stronger immigration restrictions and deportation of communists, his report stated, "the surest and most effective way of combatting communism in the United States is to give the fullest publicity to the fundamental principles and aims of the communist... as they are not likely to prove acceptable to any considerable number of American citizens, unless camouflaged by extraneous issues."

In 1933, Fish was on a committee that sponsored the publication in the United States of a translation of Communism in Germany by Adolf Ehrt, a Nazi propaganda book which claimed that Jews were responsible for communism in Germany and that only Adolf Hitler could stop it. In the prefatory note, the committee said it did not publish it as a defense of anti-Semitism or the Nazi regime but because it believed that the struggle between Nazis and communists in Germany provided a lesson about using "effective measures" to defend against communism. Under pressure from American Jewish and liberal groups, Fish and the other committee members disavowed the book.

Fish's opposition to communism and the Soviet Union led him to break with Franklin D. Roosevelt upon the President's decision to extend diplomatic recognition to the Soviet Union in 1933. Fish later called this decision "the first clear indication of the arrogance that would come to typify Roosevelt's administration." He also opposed the New Deal as "starting us down the road to socialism and dictatorship."

=== World War II ===
As the ranking Republican member on the United States House Committee on Foreign Affairs in the years leading up to World War II, Fish played the leading role in advocating against American involvement in the war and Roosevelt's policy of economic aid to the Allies, especially the Soviet Union, and what Fish viewed as antagonism of Germany and Japan.

==== Involvement with Nazi Germany ====
A non-interventionist until after the attack on Pearl Harbor, Fish was among those in the U.S. Congress who went on record protesting the treatment of Jews in Adolf Hitler's Germany, but Germans touted him as a friendly ally in Congress. Fish spoke from a stage decorated in swastikas at a German Day rally held at Madison Square Garden in 1938.

On August 14, 1939, Fish served as president of the United States delegation to the Interparliamentary Union Congress conference in Oslo, Norway, where he flew in the private plane of Joachim Ribbentrop. At the conference, Fish advocated better diplomatic relations with Nazi Germany and hoped to solve the "Danzig question," where he believed that German claims were "just." Fish and his faction of the Republican Party received material support from the Germans to promote isolationism and non-interventionism in the United States, particularly at the 1940 Republican National Convention.

Fish (and several others in Congress) became tools of the Nazi government in a plot designed to keep the US out of World War II. The German government wrote speeches that were delivered to congressional offices for members of Congress to give in the House and Senate. Once those speeches were made and published in the Congressional Record, German funds were used to print copies. Congressional mailing lists and "franked" envelopes were then used to mail the copies to hundreds of thousands of American homes and businesses. It was these actions that led to the trial of Fish's staffer, George Hill.

==== 1940 election ====
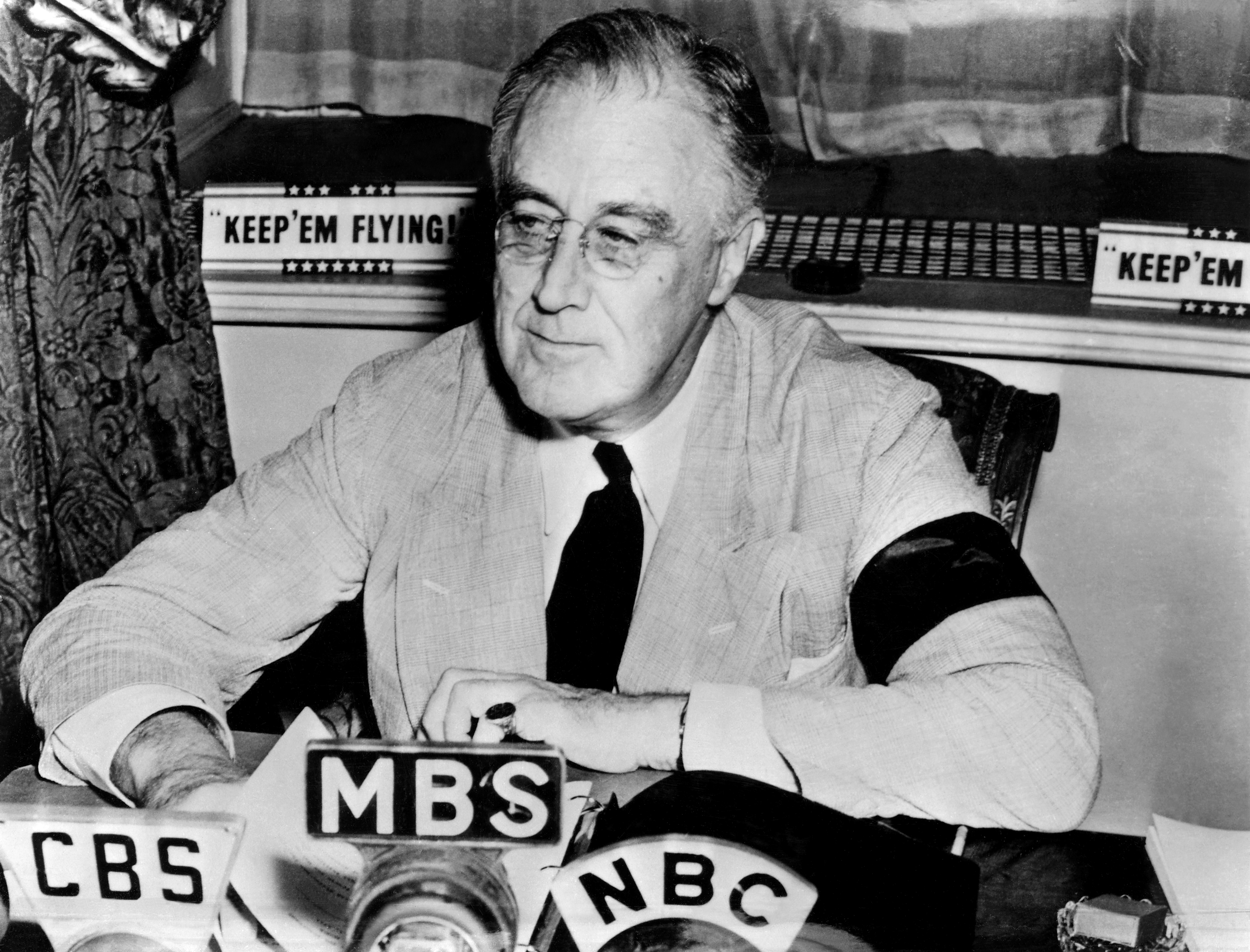
During his 1940 re-election campaign, President Roosevelt singled out Fish as one of a trio of House Republicans opposed to his agenda, along with Joseph W. Martin Jr. and Bruce Fairchild Barton. "Martin, Barton and Fish" became a popular campaign epithet.

In 1940, amid the early stages of World War II, the British Security Co-ordination agency focused a great deal of effort attempting to influence the United States government through front groups and influence. In 1940, British agents established and operated the Nonpartisan Committee to Defeat Hamilton Fish to "put the fear of God into every isolationist senator and congressman." The committee raised substantial sums of money for Fish's opponent, co-ordinated media attacks, created false charges of wrongdoing just before elections, and helped to distribute books that accused Fish of disloyalty. The committee as much as possible tried to make attacks on Fish appear to originate from his district, but historical documents indicate that most of the efforts originated elsewhere. Despite the campaign against him, Fish won his reelection, albeit with less than half the margin of victory that he had earned two years earlier.

In 1940, just after the presidential election, Fish sent a telegram to Roosevelt which read: "Congratulations. I pledge my support for national defense ... and to keep America out of foreign wars."

==== Trial of George Hill ====
In 1941, a judiciary panel investigating the activities of Nazi agents in the US, sent officers to the Washington headquarters of an anti-British organization, the Islands for War Debts Committee, to seize eight bags of franked congressional mail containing speeches by isolationist members of Congress. George Hill, Fish's chief of staff, had the mail taken to Fish's office storeroom just prior to their arrival.

A grand jury was convened and summoned Hill to explain why he had been so solicitous about the Islands for War Debts Committee's mail and his close association with George Sylvester Viereck, a Nazi propaganda agent. (Viereck would later be convicted of violating the Foreign Agents Registration Act and for having subsidized the Islands for War Debts Committee.) Hill said that he had not sent for the mail and did not know Viereck. The jury promptly indicted Hill for perjury.

Shortly after the indictment, Fish defended Hill claiming, "George Hill is 100% O.K., and I'll back George Hill to the limit on anything." During the trial, Hill had explained that Viereck visited Capitol Hill in 1940 and arranged for wholesale distribution of congressional speeches attacking the administration's foreign policy. After hearing that a jury had reached its verdict and anticipating a conviction, Fish issued a statement: "I am very sorry to learn that George Hill, a disabled, decorated veteran of the World War and a clerk in my office, has been convicted of perjury ... Mr. Hill is of English ancestry ... He had an obsession against our involvement in war." Twenty hours later, the jury convicted Hill. He was sentenced to 2 to 6 years in prison, which was reduced to 10 months to 3 years on appeal.

==== Pearl Harbor attack and call for war ====
On December 8, 1941, the day after the attack on Pearl Harbor, Fish made the first speech in Congress asking for a declaration of war against Japan. He volunteered for Army service, "preferably with colored troops," to avenge the attack. At age 53, he did not have an opportunity to volunteer, and continued to serve in Congress.

"Now that we are to fight, let us go in with our heads and chins up the American way, and let us serve notice upon the world that this is not only a war against aggression and in defense of our own territories, but a war for freedom and democracy all over the world, and that we will not stop until victory is won. […] I appeal to all American citizens, particularly to members of my own party, and to noninterventionists, to put aside personal views and partisanship, and unite behind the President, our commander-in-chief, in assuring victory to the armed forces of the United States. […]Our country! In her intercourse with foreign nations may she always be right, but right or wrong, our country!"

Fish later said he regretted his call for war and would not have made his speech had he been aware of Roosevelt's policy toward Japan before the attack. He published FDR: The Other Side of the Coin in 1976, arguing that Roosevelt had deliberately provoked the Japanese and had advance knowledge of the attack. In his 1991 memoirs, Fish described himself as "ashamed of his remarks" in support of Roosevelt.

==== 1942 election ====
In the 1942 election, Fish, like other former isolationists, was considered vulnerable. The Orange and Putnam district, which Fish represented, had begun to turn against him. Polls predicted, incorrectly, that Fish would not even win the Republican primary. For the first time in his 22 years of political campaigning, he opened campaign headquarters. Soon thereafter, he was repudiated by the popular Republican gubernatorial candidate, Thomas Dewey. Time magazine, a persistent critic of Fish, termed him "the Nation's No. 1 isolationist." Less than two weeks before the 1942 election, Drew Pearson's nationally syndicated column Washington Merry-Go-Round described in detail how in 1939, Fish had received over $3,100 in cash from a source with German ties. Fish narrowly won re-election against judge and Democratic activist Ferdinand A. Hoyt, by four percentage points, 48,793 votes to 44,751.

==== 1944 defeat ====
However, reapportionment, which took effect in 1944, fragmented what had been his 26th District. That year, he ran in the 29th District, which no longer included his home county of Putnam but included one county (Orange) from his previous district and three new counties. Augustus W. Bennet of Newburgh defeated Fish by approximately 5,000 votes. As Time magazine reported, "In New York, to the nation's delight, down went rabid anti-Roosevelt isolationist Hamilton Fish, after 24 years in Congress. His successor: liberal Augustus W. Bennet, Newburgh lawyer."

Fish said in his concession speech that his defeat "should be largely credited to Communistic and Red forces from New York City backed by a large slush fund probably exceeding $250,000." In a farewell speech before the House on December 11, 1944, he stated, "It took most of the New Deal Administration, half of Moscow, $400,000, and Governor Dewey to defeat me." Fish also stated, "I particularly wanted to be elected to serve as chairman of the Rules Committee to stop the march toward communism and totalitarianism in America. I have no regrets whatever, as I waged the strongest possible fight that I knew how."

Embittered by his defeat, Fish promptly sued Robert F. Cutler, executive secretary of the Good Government Committee group, for libel, seeking $250,000 in damages for advertisements depicting Fish as a Nazi sympathizer. The ads also depicted Fish associating with the "American Führer," Fritz Kuhn. He would later discontinue the lawsuit without a settlement.

== Later life ==
Fish was one of the witnesses interviewed in the 1981 Warren Beatty film Reds, which depicts the life of journalist John Reed and his experiences during Russia's 1917 October Revolution, which led to the creation of a communist state in Russia and the Soviet Union. As part of producing the film, the crew interviewed in the 1970s several individuals who had witnessed the events of 1917. The interviews were used throughout the film to describe places and events and to bridge transitions between the scenes.

Fish endorsed Conservative Party nominee James L. Buckley in the 1970 United States Senate election in New York.

In his 1991 memoirs, Fish would accuse the United Nations of being a means for Franklin Roosevelt to "become president of the entire world." In addition, Fish would express support for NATO, United States invasions of Panama and Grenada, and the 1990 Gulf War, while criticizing the Vietnam War. Harshly critical of American support for France against Southeast Asian independence movements, Fish would describe John Foster Dulles as the “worst Secretary of State in American history.”

== Personal life ==
Fish was married four times. His first marriage in 1921 to Grace Chapin Rogers (1885–1960), daughter of former mayor of Brooklyn Alfred C. Chapin (1848–1936), produced three children. Their son, Hamilton Fish IV, was a thirteen-term U.S. Representative from New York, holding office from 1969 to 1995. The Fishes' daughter Lillian Veronica Fish married David Whitmire Hearst, son of William Randolph Hearst.

In 1967, seven years after the death of Grace Rogers Fish, Hamilton Fish III married Marie Blackton. She died in 1974.

In 1976, Fish married Alice Desmond, the widow of his long-time colleague Thomas Desmond. In 1980, Fish and Desmond created a library for the Garrison, NY community where the Fish family had family ties. Mrs. Fish gave the funds to establish the Alice Curtis Desmond and Hamilton Fish Library. The couple divorced in 1984.

Fish married his fourth and final wife, Lydia Ambrogio Fish, on September 9, 1988, Fish was aged 99 while Ambrogio was aged 56. They remained married until his death. She died in Port Jervis on January 12, 2015.

== Death and burial ==
Fish died in Cold Spring, New York, on January 18, 1991, at the age of 102. He was buried at Saint Philip's Church Cemetery in Garrison, New York.

== Works ==
=== Books ===
- George Washington in the Highlands, or Some Unwritten History. Newburgh, NY: Newburgh News (1932).
- The Red Plotters. New York: Domestic and Foreign Affairs Publishers (1947).
- The Challenge of World Communism. Milwaukee: Bruce Publishing Company (1946).
- FDR: The Other Side of the Coin: How We Were Tricked Into World War II. New York: Vantage Press (1976). ISBN 978-0533022205.
- Lafayette in America During and After the Revolutionary War and Other Essays on Franco-American Relations. New York: Vantage Press (1976). ISBN 0533023149, 978-0533023141.
- New York State: The Battleground of the Revolutionary War. New York: Vantage Press (1976). ISBN 0533021286, 978-0533021284.
- Tragic Deception: FDR and America's Involvement in World War II. Preface by the publisher. Old Greenwich, Conn.: Devin-Adair (1983). ISBN 0815969171, 978-0815969174.
- Fish, Hamilton III (1991). Hamilton Fish: Memoir of an American Patriot. Chicago: Regnery Publishing. ISBN 0895265311.

=== Reports ===
- Participation in the Preparatory Commission to Consider Questions of Reduction and Limitation of Armaments (To Accompany H. J. Res. 352) (February 12, 1927).

=== Public addresses ===
- "The Republican Party Keeps Faith With Lincoln." (February 13, 1928). Delivered at the Lincoln Club in St. Paul, Minnesota.

== See also ==
- List of members of the American Legion
- List of centenarians (politicians and civil servants)
- Pearl Harbor advance-knowledge conspiracy theory

New York State Assembly
Preceded by John R. Yale	New York State Assembly; Putnam County; 1914-1916	Succeeded by John P. Donohoe
U.S. House of Representatives
Preceded by Edmund Platt	Member of the U.S. House of Representatives from New York's 26th congressional district 1920–1945	Succeeded by Peter A. Quinn
Honorary titles
Preceded by Carl Vinson	Most senior living U.S. representative (Sitting or former); June 1, 1981 – January 18, 1991	Succeeded by Victor Christgau
Preceded by Elizabeth Hawley Gasque	Oldest living U.S. representative (Sitting or former); November 2, 1989 – January 18, 1991	Succeeded by Peter J. De Muth
