= Ole J. Kvale =

American politician

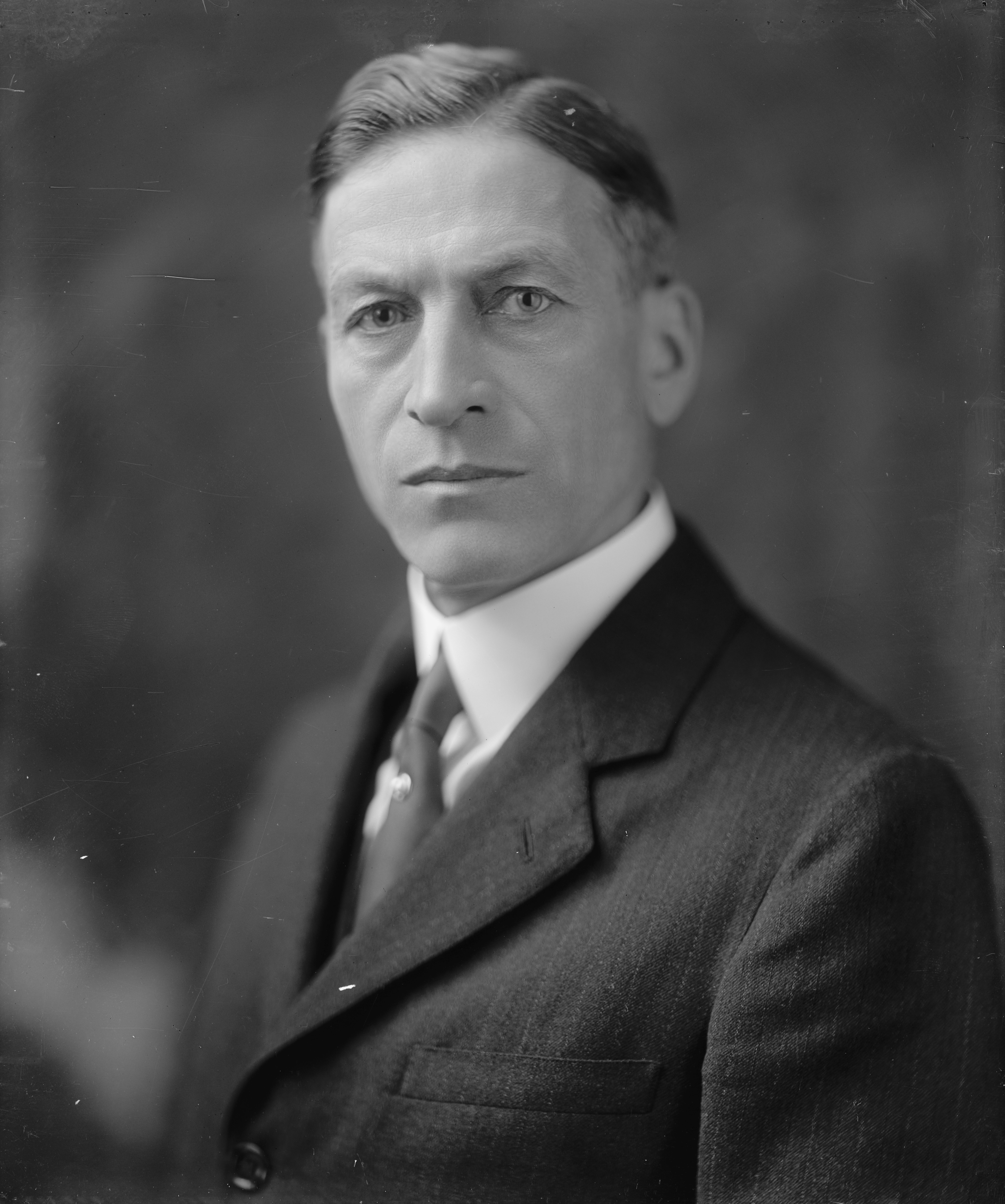
- Portrait by Harris & Ewing c. 1923–1929

Member of the U.S. House of Representatives from Minnesota's 7th district
- In office March 4, 1923 – September 11, 1929
- Preceded by: Andrew Volstead
- Succeeded by: Paul J. Kvale

Personal details
- Born: Ole Juulson Kvale; February 6, 1869 Winneshiek County, Iowa, U.S.
- Died: September 11, 1929 (aged 60) Otter Tail, Minnesota, U.S.
- Cause of death: House fire
- Party: Farmer-Labor
- Spouse: Ida Simley
- Children: 6, including Paul John
- Education: Luther College; Luther Theological Seminary; University of Chicago

Ole Juulson Kvale (February 6, 1869 – September 11, 1929) was a Lutheran minister and U.S. representative from Minnesota. After an unsuccessful candidacy as an Independent Republican in 1920, in 1922, he was elected under the Farmer-Labor banner to represent the 7th district in western Minnesota. He served for six and a half years until his death in a fire at his summer home.

== Background ==
Ole Juulson Kvale was born near Decorah, Iowa. He was one of six children born to Jule Qvale (1836-1918) and Gro Qvale (1833-1910), a farmer, both of whom were immigrants from Norway. He inherited his family name from the Kvåle farm in Vestre Slidre Municipality in the Valdres valley district. He attended rural schools in Winneshiek County, Iowa. He graduated from Luther College in Decorah in 1890, where he played the snare drum and was involved in theater. Later, he received degrees from Luther Theological Seminary, in Minneapolis, Minnesota, in 1893 and from the University of Chicago in 1914. He was ordained to the Lutheran ministry in 1894 serving parishes in Orfordville, Wisconsin, from 1894 to 1917 and in Benson, Minnesota. In 1917, he became the secretary of the Norwegian Synod.

== Career ==
Kvale was an unsuccessful candidate in the Republican primary for election to the 67th U.S. Congress in 1920. Despite getting 17,000 votes in the primary compared with 15,000 for opponent Andrew Volstead, a judge ruled him ineligible due to a state law against making false statements about political opponents and alleged violations of the Federal Corrupt Practices Act. Volstead claimed that Kvale had called him an atheist.

The next was elected as a Farmer-Labor candidate to the 68th, 69th, 70th, and 71st congresses and served from March 4, 1923, until his death. At the time of his death, Kvale was the only Farmer-Labor representative in Congress. He was succeeded by his son, Paul J. Kvale, also from the Farmer-Labor party.

Kvale ran both times in opposition to Andrew Volstead, architect of the Volstead Act that started Prohibition in the United States. He was a prohibitionist himself, but opposed the Volstead Act for privileging the rich, calling it "the greatest tragedy ever witnessed by civilization." Kvale advocated for a national referendum on Prohibition and a greater focus on enforcement against the wealthy. In June 1929, when a Prohibition agent near the Canadian border shot a Minnesota merchant named Henry Virkula, to death, Kvale condemned the agents responsible, but did not join other members of the Minnesota delegation in calls to punish the agent responsible.

== Personal life ==
He was married to Ida Tonette (Simley) Kvale (1876-1926). They had six children including United States Representative Paul John Kvale. Ole Kvale died in a fire in his summer house near Otter Tail Lake, Minnesota, on September 11, 1929. His interment was in Benson Cemetery, Swift County, Minnesota. His wife had died three years earlier.

== Primary source ==
- United States Congress. "Ole J. Kvale (id: K000349)". Biographical Directory of the United States Congress.

== See also ==
- List of members of the United States Congress who died in office (1900–1949)

U.S. House of Representatives
Preceded by Andrew Volstead	U.S. Representative from Minnesota's 7th congressional district 1923 – 1929	Succeeded by Paul John Kvale
