= Model Marine Insurance Act of 1922 =

The Model Marine Insurance Act of 1922 regulated Marine insurance in the District of Columbia and was intended as a model for the states to follow. It was passed on the initiative of the House Committee on Merchant Marine and Fisheries as being one of a series of steps necessary to improve the shipping trade and the commerce of the U.S., by putting them more on parity with other competing commercial nations. The bill authorized the formation of specific marine insurance companies to cover property damages done by fires, earthquakes and accidents, as well as covering injury and death.
