= Joint Service Pay Readjustment Act =

The Joint Service Pay Readjustment Act of 1922 (Public Law 67-235) is a law dealing with compensation for the United States armed services. It was signed into law by President Harding on June 10, 1922.

Prior to enactment, separate pay legislation for the United States Army and Navy was the norm. With the law, Congress attempted to deal with compensation for all the armed services in a comprehensive manner in response to higher living costs.

Officers were now to be paid in pay periods rather than quarterly or yearly, but still did not receive a "pay grade" like enlisted men and non-commissioned officers. Higher rates of pay were established for all ranks and longevity credits were given as “permanent additions” to base pay. Cash allowances were authorized for enlisted personnel when quarters and subsistence were not furnished in kind.

As part of the act, the United States Coast Guard was fully elevated to a branch of the armed forces.
