= General Exchange Act of 1922 =

The General Exchange Act of 1922 (March 20, 1922; 42 Stat. 465, as amended; 74 Stat. 205; 16 U.S.C. 485, 486, 7 U.S.C. 2201) permitted the United States Secretary of the Interior to accept or acquire lands outside of the boundaries of current national parks deemed to be of national-forest purposes interest. Federal land could also be exchanged for privately owned land within the boundaries of United States National Forest. The law permits acquisition of lands by exchange, encumbered by reservations of timber, or minerals or easements that would not interfere with use of the lands for National Forest purposes.

This was a new type of act, the purpose of which was to relieve Congress of the burden of considering new legislation every time an exchange authority was proposed for a federal tract. Against this burden was balanced the difficulty of making certain, without Congressional consideration of each exchange, that the terms of the exchange were responsive to local needs.

The act is amended by the Federal Land Policy and Management Act of October 21, 1976 (90 Stat. 2743; 43 U.S.C. 1715, 1716), which authorizes the Secretary to accept title to any non-Federal land or interest therein.
