= Capper–Volstead Act =

United States federal agriculture law

- Long title: An Act To authorize association of producers of agricultural products.
- Enacted by: the 67th United States Congress

Citations
- Public law: Pub. L. 67–146
- Statutes at Large: Sess. II, ch. 57, 42 Stat. 388–389

Legislative history
- Introduced in the House as H.R. 2373 by Andrew Volstead (R–MN) on ?; Committee consideration by ?; Passed the House on May 4, 1921 (295-49); Passed the Senate on February 8, 1922 (58-1) with amendment; House agreed to Senate amendment on February 11, 1922 (276-8); Signed into law by President Warren G. Harding on February 18, 1922

United States Supreme Court cases
- Case-Swayne Co. v. Sunkist Growers, Inc., 389 U.S. 384 (1967); National Broiler Marketing Assn. v. U.S, 436 U.S. 816 (1978)

The Capper–Volstead Act, officially the Co-operative Marketing Associations Act, was adopted by the United States Congress on February 18, 1922. It gave associations of agriculturalists broad exemptions from antitrust laws. It is therefore sometimes called the Magna Carta of the American farming cooperatives.

== Origins ==
The law was passed in response to increasing legal challenges made against cooperatives on the grounds they violated federal antitrust legislation, particularly the Sherman Act (15 U.S.C. 1 et seq.), the Clayton Antitrust Act (15 U.S.C. 12 et seq.), and the Federal Trade Commission Act (15 U.S.C. 41 et seq.). Amid the devastating slump in agricultural prices that followed the First World War, farm organizations in the United States intensified their drive for government relief and managed to get a farm bloc established in Congress to advance their interests, including protection against what they argued was the misapplication of antitrust laws against cooperatives. Such legislation, they complained, was intended to break up the powerful amalgamations of industrial and financial firms that acted to drive out competition and ratchet up the prices of manufactured goods (which, unlike those of crops, soared after the First World War, leading to the infamous Scissors Crisis of the 1920s), not voluntary partnerships among struggling farmers. Senator Arthur Capper of Kansas belonged to the farmer bloc, and Representative Andrew Volstead of Minnesota allied himself with it. Both played central parts in the formulation and promotion of the Act, which became one of the bloc's most notable and consequential political achievements.

== Content ==
The Act authorized various kinds of agriculturalists to form voluntary co-operative associations for purposes of organizing, handling, and marketing their produce. It thereby exempted such associations from most antitrust laws. Nevertheless, to quell concerns that these cooperatives would seek to increase agricultural prices grossly and artificially, the Act included provisions to empower the United States Secretary of Agriculture to prevent cooperatives from instituting and maintaining monopolies, albeit purely at his own discretion. To this end, the Agriculture Secretary got the authority to hold hearings, gather information, and issue orders for the breakup of any monopolies judged to have resulted from the formation and activities of the cooperatives. Such decisions, in turn, were made subject to review by federal district courts.
