= Vantage Press =

American vanity press

Vantage Press was a publishing company based in New York City with an advertised office in Hollywood. The company was founded in 1949 and ceased operations in late 2012.

Vantage was the largest vanity press in the United States. In 1955, they landed a title on the national best-sellers list for their first and only time; Jehova's Witnesses sold 100,000 copies. By 1956, they were publishing hundreds of titles per year. By 1958, they were facing legal problems, as the Federal Trade Commission raised charges regarding their use of the term "cooperative" to explain their business model, when the author was actually paying all of the costs. In 1975, the average cost for an author was $4000. In 1990, the State Supreme Court in New York ordered Vantage to pay $3.5 million in damages to 2,200 authors it had defrauded. According to the plaintiffs, Vantage charged money upfront, but never promoted the books as the authors had expected. One former Vantage employee described what they offered as "a facsimile of publicity". Vantage's deals would stipulate the number of books printed, but many of those books were kept as unbound sheets, which could be bound if demand arose.
