= Martin Dies =

Martin Dies may refer to:

- Martin Dies Sr. (1870–1922), U.S. Representative from Texas, father of Martin Dies Jr.
  - Known as Martin Dies during his lifetime, and as Martin Dies Sr. posthumously
- Martin Dies Jr. (1900–1972), U.S. Representative from Texas, son of Martin Dies Sr. and father of Martin Dies Jr. (1921–2001)
  - Known as Martin Dies Jr. until the mid-1930s, and as Martin Dies or Martin Dies Sr. from the mid-1930s onward
- Martin Dies Jr. (politician, born 1921) (1921–2001), Texas state senator, secretary of state, and jurist, son of Martin Dies Jr.
  - Known throughout his life as Martin Dies Jr.
