= Ottis Elmer Lock =

Texas politician

Member of the Texas Senate from the 3rd district
- In office January 11, 1949 – January 13, 1959
- Preceded by: Ben Ramsey
- Succeeded by: Martin Dies Jr.
President pro tempore
President pro tempore of the Texas Senate
In office January 8, 1957 – May 23, 1957
Preceded by	Neveille Colson
Succeeded by	Carlos C. Ashley, Sr.

Member of the Texas House of Representatives from the 12th district
- In office July 23, 1938 – January 11, 1949
- Preceded by: Samuel Aubrey Jones
- Succeeded by: Raymond T.R. Tatum

President of Lufkin School Board

Personal details
- Born: Ottis Elmer Lock; July 28, 1910 Angelina County, Texas, U.S.
- Died: August 15, 1998 (aged 88)
- Resting place: Lufkin, Texas
- Party: Democratic
- Spouse: Viola Williamson
- Children: 3
- Education: Stephen F. Austin State University (BS); University of Texas

Military service
- Allegiance: United States
- Branch/service: United States Army
- Battles/wars: World War II

Ottis Elmer Lock (July 28, 1910 - August 15, 1998) was an American politician who served in the Texas House of Representatives for District 12, he also served in the Texas Senate for District 3, he was also President pro tempore of the Texas Senate.

== Personal life ==
Lock was born July 28, 1910, in Angelina County, Texas. He attended high school at Rusk Academy and attended Stephen F. Austin State University, where he graduated with a bachelor of science degree in history and education. He worked numerous jobs for Laneville Independent School District, during the summer time he would study law at the University of Texas and later passed the bar exam becoming an attorney. Lock enlisted in the United States Army to fight in World War II, he was a second lieutenant. He worked 15 years for Southland Paper Mills in Lufkin, Texas. He was married to Viola Williamson and they had three sons. Lock died on August 15, 1998, and is buried in Lufkin, Texas.

== Political career ==
Lock served Texas House of Representatives District 12 during the 45th, 46th, 47th, 48th, 49th, and 50th Legislatures. He was known to be a strong advocate of public schools. Lock also served in the Texas Senate for District 3 during the 51st, 52nd, 53rd, 54th, and 55th legislatures. He was President pro tempore of the Texas Senate during part of the 55th legislature. Lock also served as president of the Lufkin School Board. Lock was affiliated with the Democratic Party.

=== Civic service ===
Lock was involved in various civic work.

- Lufkin Youth Baseball Association
- State Senior Colleges Board of Regents
- Texas Public Safety Commission
