= List of United States representatives in the 72nd Congress =

This is a complete list of United States representatives during the 72nd United States Congress listed by seniority.

As an historical article, the districts and party affiliations listed reflect those during the 72nd Congress (March 4, 1931 – March 3, 1933). Seats and party affiliations on similar lists for other congresses will be different for certain members.

Seniority depends on the date on which members were sworn into office. Since many members are sworn in on the same day, subsequent ranking is based on previous congressional service of the individual and then by alphabetical order by the last name of the representative.

Committee chairmanship in the House is often associated with seniority. However, party leadership is typically not associated with seniority.

Note: The "*" indicates that the representative/delegate may have served one or more non-consecutive terms while in the House of Representatives of the United States Congress.

== U.S. House seniority list ==
U.S. House seniority
Rank	Representative	Party	District	Seniority date (Previous service, if any)	No. of term(s)	Notes
1	Gilbert N. Haugen	R	IA-04	March 4, 1899	17th term	Dean of the House; Left the House in 1933.
2	Edward W. Pou	D	NC-04	March 4, 1901	16th term	
3	John Nance Garner	D	TX-15	March 4, 1903	15th term	Speaker of the House; Left the House in 1933.
4	Willis C. Hawley	R	OR-01	March 4, 1907	13th term	Left the House in 1933.
5	James C. McLaughlin	R	MI-09	March 4, 1907	13th term	Died on November 29, 1932.
6	Adolph J. Sabath	D	IL-05	March 4, 1907	13th term	
7	Joseph W. Byrns Sr.	D	TN-06	March 4, 1909	12th term	
8	James W. Collier	D	MS-08	March 4, 1909	12th term	Left the House in 1933.
9	Edward T. Taylor	D	CO-04	March 4, 1909	12th term	
10	Robert L. Doughton	D	NC-08	March 4, 1911	11th term	
11	John Charles Linthicum	D	MD-04	March 4, 1911	11th term	Died on October 5, 1932.
12	James Benjamin Aswell	D	LA-08	March 4, 1913	10th term	Died on March 16, 1931.
13	Frederick A. Britten	R	IL-09	March 4, 1913	10th term	
14	Charles R. Crisp	D	GA-03	March 4, 1913; Previous service, 1896–1897.	11th term*	Resigned on October 7, 1932.
15	James A. Frear	R	WI-10	March 4, 1913	10th term	
16	George Scott Graham	R	PA-02	March 4, 1913	10th term	Died on July 4, 1931.
17	Albert Johnson	R	WA-03	March 4, 1913	10th term	Left the House in 1933.
18	Carl E. Mapes	R	MI-05	March 4, 1913	10th term	
19	Andrew Jackson Montague	D	VA-03	March 4, 1913	10th term	
20	James S. Parker	R	NY-29	March 4, 1913	10th term	
21	Percy Quin	D	MS-07	March 4, 1913	10th term	Died on February 4, 1932.
22	Sam Rayburn	D	TX-04	March 4, 1913	10th term	
23	Addison T. Smith	R	ID-02	March 4, 1913	10th term	Left the House in 1933.
24	Hatton W. Sumners	D	TX-05	March 4, 1913	10th term	
25	Allen T. Treadway	R	MA-01	March 4, 1913	10th term	
26	James P. Buchanan	D	TX-10	April 15, 1913	10th term	
27	Carl Vinson	D	GA-10	November 3, 1914	10th term	
28	Edward B. Almon	D	AL-08	March 4, 1915	9th term	
29	Isaac Bacharach	R	NJ-02	March 4, 1915	9th term	
30	John G. Cooper	R	OH-19	March 4, 1915	9th term	
31	Cassius C. Dowell	R	IA-07	March 4, 1915	9th term	
32	George P. Darrow	R	PA-07	March 4, 1915	9th term	
33	Leonidas C. Dyer	R	MO-12	March 4, 1915; Previous service, 1911–1914.	11th term*	Left the House in 1933.
34	Richard P. Freeman	R	CT-02	March 4, 1915	9th term	Left the House in 1933.
35	Lindley H. Hadley	R	WA-02	March 4, 1915	9th term	Left the House in 1933.
36	George Huddleston	D	AL-09	March 4, 1915	9th term	
37	W. Frank James	R	MI-12	March 4, 1915	9th term	
38	Royal C. Johnson	R	SD-02	March 4, 1915	9th term	Left the House in 1933.
39	Frederick R. Lehlbach	R	NJ-10	March 4, 1915	9th term	
40	Nicholas Longworth	R	OH-01	March 4, 1915; Previous service, 1903–1913.	14th term*	Died on April 9, 1931.
41	James V. McClintic	D	OK-07	March 4, 1915	9th term	
42	Louis Thomas McFadden	R	PA-15	March 4, 1915	9th term	
43	William Bacon Oliver	D	AL-06	March 4, 1915	9th term	
44	Christian William Ramseyer	R	IA-06	March 4, 1915	9th term	Left the House in 1933.
45	Henry B. Steagall	D	AL-03	March 4, 1915	9th term	
46	John Q. Tilson	R	CT-03	March 4, 1915; Previous service, 1909–1913.	11th term*	Resigned on December 3, 1932.
47	Charles B. Timberlake	R	CO-02	March 4, 1915	9th term	Left the House in 1933.
48	George H. Tinkham	R	MA-11	March 4, 1915	9th term	
49	Edward Hills Wason	R	NH-02	March 4, 1915	9th term	Left the House in 1933.
50	Henry Winfield Watson	R	PA-09	March 4, 1915	9th term	
51	Riley J. Wilson	D	LA-05	March 4, 1915	9th term	
52	William R. Wood	R	IN-10	March 4, 1915	9th term	Left the House in 1933.
53	Bertrand Snell	R	NY-31	November 2, 1915	9th term	
54	Henry Wilson Temple	R	PA-25	November 2, 1915; Previous service, 1913–1915.	10th term*	Left the House in 1933.
55	William B. Bankhead	D	AL-10	March 4, 1917	8th term	
56	Charles Hillyer Brand	D	GA-08	March 4, 1917	8th term	
57	Guy Edgar Campbell	R	PA-36	March 4, 1917	8th term	Left the House in 1933.
58	Frederick H. Dominick	D	SC-03	March 4, 1917	8th term	Left the House in 1933.
59	Herbert J. Drane	D	FL-01	March 4, 1917	8th term	Left the House in 1933.
60	Burton L. French	R	ID-01	March 4, 1917; Previous service, 1903–1909 and 1911–1915.	13th term**	Left the House in 1933.
61	John Marvin Jones	D	TX-18	March 4, 1917	8th term	
62	Melville Clyde Kelly	R	PA-33	March 4, 1917; Previous service, 1913–1915.	9th term*	
63	Harold Knutson	R	MN-06	March 4, 1917	8th term	
64	William Washington Larsen	D	GA-12	March 4, 1917	8th term	Left the House in 1933.
65	Clarence F. Lea	D	CA-01	March 4, 1917	8th term	
66	Joseph J. Mansfield	D	TX-09	March 4, 1917	8th term	
67	Fred S. Purnell	R	IN-09	March 4, 1917	8th term	Left the House in 1933.
68	Archie D. Sanders	R	NY-39	March 4, 1917	8th term	Left the House in 1933.
69	William Francis Stevenson	D	SC-05	March 4, 1917	8th term	Left the House in 1933.
70	Nathan Leroy Strong	R	PA-27	March 4, 1917	8th term	
71	Christopher D. Sullivan	D	NY-13	March 4, 1917	8th term	
72	Albert Henry Vestal	R	IN-08	March 4, 1917	8th term	Died on April 1, 1932.
73	William C. Wright	D	GA-04	January 16, 1918	8th term	Left the House in 1933.
74	Anthony J. Griffin	D	NY-22	March 5, 1918	8th term	
75	S. Otis Bland	D	VA-01	July 2, 1918	8th term	
76	Ernest Robinson Ackerman	R	NJ-05	March 4, 1919	7th term	Died on October 18, 1931.
77	Henry E. Barbour	R	CA-07	March 4, 1919	7th term	Left the House in 1933.
78	Clay Stone Briggs	D	TX-07	March 4, 1919	7th term	
79	Clark Burdick	R	RI-01	March 4, 1919	7th term	Left the House in 1933.
80	Carl Richard Chindblom	R	IL-10	March 4, 1919	7th term	Left the House in 1933.
81	Charles A. Christopherson	R	SD-01	March 4, 1919	7th term	Left the House in 1933.
82	Frank Crowther	R	NY-30	March 4, 1919	7th term	
83	Thomas H. Cullen	D	NY-04	March 4, 1919	7th term	
84	Ewin Lamar Davis	D	TN-05	March 4, 1919	7th term	Left the House in 1933.
85	Guy U. Hardy	R	CO-03	March 4, 1919	7th term	Left the House in 1933.
86	Homer Hoch	R	KS-04	March 4, 1919	7th term	Left the House in 1933.
87	Samuel Austin Kendall	R	PA-24	March 4, 1919	7th term	Died on January 8, 1933.
88	William Chester Lankford	D	GA-11	March 4, 1919	7th term	Left the House in 1933.
89	Robert Luce	R	MA-13	March 4, 1919	7th term	
90	John McDuffie	D	AL-01	March 4, 1919	7th term	
91	James M. Mead	D	NY-42	March 4, 1919	7th term	
92	Earl C. Michener	R	MI-02	March 4, 1919	7th term	Left the House in 1933.
93	C. Ellis Moore	R	OH-15	March 4, 1919	7th term	Left the House in 1933.
94	B. Frank Murphy	R	OH-18	March 4, 1919	7th term	Left the House in 1933.
95	Daniel A. Reed	R	NY-43	March 4, 1919	7th term	
96	Milton William Shreve	R	PA-29	March 4, 1919; Previous service, 1913–1915.	8th term*	Left the House in 1933.
97	James H. Sinclair	R	ND-03	March 4, 1919	7th term	
98	James G. Strong	R	KS-05	March 4, 1919	7th term	Left the House in 1933.
99	John W. Summers	R	WA-04	March 4, 1919	7th term	Left the House in 1933.
100	J. Will Taylor	R	TN-02	March 4, 1919	7th term	
101	Richard Yates Jr.	D	IL	March 4, 1919	7th term	Left the House in 1933.
102	Fritz G. Lanham	D	TX-12	April 19, 1919	7th term	
103	Patrick H. Drewry	D	VA-04	April 27, 1920	7th term	
104	Hamilton Fish Jr.	R	NY-26	November 2, 1920	7th term	
105	Harry C. Ransley	R	PA-03	November 2, 1920	7th term	
106	Carroll L. Beedy	R	ME-01	March 4, 1921	6th term	
107	Olger B. Burtness	R	ND-01	March 4, 1921	6th term	Left the House in 1933.
108	Frank Clague	R	MN-02	March 4, 1921	6th term	Left the House in 1933.
109	Ross A. Collins	D	MS-05	March 4, 1921	6th term	
110	Don B. Colton	R	UT-01	March 4, 1921	6th term	Left the House in 1933.
111	James J. Connolly	R	PA-05	March 4, 1921	6th term	
112	William J. Driver	D	AR-01	March 4, 1921	6th term	
113	Arthur M. Free	R	CA-08	March 4, 1921	6th term	Left the House in 1933.
114	Hampton P. Fulmer	D	SC-07	March 4, 1921	6th term	
115	Daniel E. Garrett	D	TX-08	March 4, 1921; Previous service, 1913–1915 and 1917–1919.	8th term**	Died on December 13, 1932.
116	Thomas Alan Goldsborough	D	MD-01	March 4, 1921	6th term	
117	John C. Ketcham	R	MI-04	March 4, 1921	6th term	Left the House in 1933.
118	William F. Kopp	R	IA-01	March 4, 1921	6th term	Left the House in 1933.
119	John J. McSwain	D	SC-04	March 4, 1921	6th term	
120	John M. Nelson	R	WI-03	March 4, 1921; Previous service, 1906–1919.	13th term*	Left the House in 1933.
121	Tilman B. Parks	D	AR-07	March 4, 1921	6th term	
122	Randolph Perkins	R	NJ-06	March 4, 1921	6th term	
123	John E. Rankin	D	MS-01	March 4, 1921	6th term	
124	Morgan G. Sanders	D	TX-03	March 4, 1921	6th term	
125	John N. Sandlin	D	LA-04	March 4, 1921	6th term	
126	Phil Swing	R	CA-11	March 4, 1921	6th term	Left the House in 1933.
127	Charles L. Underhill	R	MA-09	March 4, 1921	6th term	Left the House in 1933.
128	William Williamson	R	SD-03	March 4, 1921	6th term	Left the House in 1933.
129	Roy O. Woodruff	R	MI-10	March 4, 1921; Previous service, 1913–1915.	7th term*	
130	Adam Martin Wyant	R	PA-31	March 4, 1921	6th term	Left the House in 1933.
131	Lamar Jeffers	D	AL-04	June 7, 1921	6th term	
132	Cyrenus Cole	R	IA-05	August 1, 1921	6th term	Left the House in 1933.
133	A. Piatt Andrew	R	MA-06	September 27, 1921	6th term	
134	John E. Nelson	R	ME-03	March 20, 1922	6th term	Left the House in 1933.
135	Henry St. George Tucker	D	VA-10	March 21, 1922; Previous service, 1889–1897.	11th term*	Died on July 23, 1932.
136	Guinn Williams	D	TX-13	May 22, 1922	6th term	Left the House in 1933.
137	Charles Laban Abernethy	D	NC-03	November 7, 1922	6th term	
138	Charles L. Gifford	R	MA-16	November 7, 1922	6th term	
139	Richard S. Aldrich	R	RI-02	March 4, 1923	5th term	Left the House in 1933.
140	Miles C. Allgood	D	AL-07	March 4, 1923	5th term	
141	William W. Arnold	D	IL-23	March 4, 1923	5th term	
142	William Augustus Ayres	D	KS-08	March 4, 1923; Previous service, 1915–1921.	8th term*	
143	Robert L. Bacon	R	NY-01	March 4, 1923	5th term	
144	Edward M. Beers	R	PA-18	March 4, 1923	5th term	Died on April 21, 1932.
145	Loring Milton Black Jr.	D	NY-05	March 4, 1923	5th term	
146	Sol Bloom	D	NY-19	March 4, 1923	5th term	
147	John J. Boylan	D	NY-15	March 4, 1923	5th term	
148	Charles Brand	R	OH-07	March 4, 1923	5th term	Left the House in 1933.
149	Gordon Browning	D	TN-08	March 4, 1923	5th term	
150	T. Jeff Busby	D	MS-04	March 4, 1923	5th term	
151	Harry C. Canfield	D	IN-04	March 4, 1923	5th term	Left the House in 1933.
152	Clarence Cannon	D	MO-09	March 4, 1923	5th term	
153	Emanuel Celler	D	NY-10	March 4, 1923	5th term	
154	William P. Connery Jr.	D	MA-07	March 4, 1923	5th term	
155	Parker Corning	D	NY-28	March 4, 1923	5th term	
156	Robert Crosser	D	OH-21	March 4, 1923; Previous service, 1913–1919.	8th term*	
157	Samuel Dickstein	D	NY-12	March 4, 1923	5th term	
158	John M. Evans	D	MT-01	March 4, 1923; Previous service, 1913–1921.	9th term*	Left the House in 1933.
159	Milton C. Garber	R	OK-08	March 4, 1923	5th term	Left the House in 1933.
160	Arthur H. Greenwood	D	IN-02	March 4, 1923	5th term	
161	William Wirt Hastings	D	OK-02	March 4, 1923; Previous service, 1915–1921.	8th term*	
162	William P. Holaday	R	IL-18	March 4, 1923	5th term	Left the House in 1933.
163	Edgar Howard	D	NE-03	March 4, 1923	5th term	
164	William E. Hull	R	IL-16	March 4, 1923	5th term	Left the House in 1933.
165	Luther Alexander Johnson	D	TX-06	March 4, 1923	5th term	
166	Jacob Banks Kurtz	R	PA-21	March 4, 1923	5th term	
167	Allard H. Gasque	D	SC-06	March 4, 1923	5th term	
168	Fiorello H. La Guardia	R	NY-20	March 4, 1923; Previous service, 1917–1919.	7th term*	Left the House in 1933.
169	Scott Leavitt	R	MT-02	March 4, 1923	5th term	Left the House in 1933.
170	George W. Lindsay	D	NY-03	March 4, 1923	5th term	
171	Ralph F. Lozier	D	MO-02	March 4, 1923	5th term	
172	Joe J. Manlove	R	MO-15	March 4, 1923	5th term	Left the House in 1933.
173	Tom D. McKeown	D	OK-04	March 4, 1923; Previous service, 1917–1921.	7th term*	
174	Clarence J. McLeod	R	MI-13	March 4, 1923; Previous service, 1920–1921.	6th term*	
175	Samuel Davis McReynolds	D	TN-03	March 4, 1923	5th term	
176	Jacob L. Milligan	D	MO-03	March 4, 1923; Previous service, 1920–1921.	6th term*	
177	Charles A. Mooney	D	OH-20	March 4, 1923; Previous service, 1919–1921.	6th term*	Died on May 29, 1931.
178	John H. Morehead	D	NE-01	March 4, 1923	5th term	
179	Frank A. Oliver	D	NY-23	March 4, 1923	5th term	
180	Hubert H. Peavey	R	WI-11	March 4, 1923	5th term	
181	Heartsill Ragon	D	AR-05	March 4, 1923	5th term	
182	Henry Thomas Rainey	D	IL-20	March 4, 1923; Previous service, 1903–1921.	14th term*	
183	Frank R. Reid	R	IL-11	March 4, 1923	5th term	
184	Thomas J. B. Robinson	R	IA-03	March 4, 1923	5th term	Left the House in 1933.
185	Milton A. Romjue	D	MO-01	March 4, 1923; Previous service, 1917–1921.	7th term*	
186	John C. Schafer	R	WI-04	March 4, 1923	5th term	Left the House in 1933.
187	George J. Schneider	R	WI-09	March 4, 1923	5th term	Left the House in 1933.
188	George N. Seger	R	NJ-07	March 4, 1923	5th term	
189	Robert G. Simmons	R	NE-06	March 4, 1923	5th term	Left the House in 1933.
190	Gale H. Stalker	R	NY-37	March 4, 1923	5th term	
191	John Taber	R	NY-36	March 4, 1923	5th term	
192	Maurice Thatcher	R	KY-05	March 4, 1923	5th term	Left the House in 1933.
193	Mell G. Underwood	D	OH-11	March 4, 1923	5th term	
194	Bird J. Vincent	R	MI-08	March 4, 1923	5th term	Died on July 18, 1931.
195	George Austin Welsh	R	PA-06	March 4, 1923	5th term	Resigned on May 31, 1932.
196	Clifton A. Woodrum	D	VA-06	March 4, 1923	5th term	
197	Morton D. Hull	R	IL-02	April 3, 1923	5th term	Left the House in 1933.
198	J. Lister Hill	D	AL-02	August 14, 1923	5th term	
199	Samuel B. Hill	D	WA-05	September 25, 1923	5th term	
200	Ernest Willard Gibson	R	VT-02	November 6, 1923	5th term	
201	John H. Kerr	D	NC-02	November 6, 1923	5th term	
202	John J. O'Connor	D	NY-16	November 6, 1923	5th term	
203	Anning Smith Prall	D	NY-11	November 6, 1923	5th term	
204	Stephen Warfield Gambrill	D	MD-05	November 4, 1924	5th term	
205	Thomas Hall	R	ND-02	November 4, 1924	5th term	Left the House in 1933.
206	Charles Adkins	R	IL-19	March 4, 1925	4th term	Left the House in 1933.
207	John Clayton Allen	R	IL-14	March 4, 1925	4th term	Left the House in 1933.
208	August H. Andresen	R	MN-03	March 4, 1925	4th term	Left the House in 1933.
209	Samuel S. Arentz	R	NV	March 4, 1925; Previous service, 1921–1923.	5th term*	Left the House in 1933.
210	Oscar L. Auf der Heide	D	NJ-11	March 4, 1925	4th term	
211	Carl G. Bachmann	R	WV-01	March 4, 1925	4th term	Left the House in 1933.
212	Frank Llewellyn Bowman	R	WV-02	March 4, 1925	4th term	Left the House in 1933.
213	Albert E. Carter	R	CA-06	March 4, 1925	4th term	
214	Edward E. Cox	D	GA-02	March 4, 1925	4th term	
215	Frederick M. Davenport	R	NY-33	March 4, 1925	4th term	Left the House in 1933.
216	John J. Douglass	D	MA-10	March 4, 1925	4th term	
217	Charles Aubrey Eaton	R	NJ-04	March 4, 1925	4th term	
218	Charles Gordon Edwards	D	GA-01	March 4, 1925; Previous service, 1907–1917.	9th term*	Died on July 13, 1931.
219	Edward Everett Eslick	D	TN-07	March 4, 1925	4th term	Died on June 14, 1932.
220	Frank H. Foss	R	MA-03	March 4, 1925	4th term	
221	Benjamin M. Golder	R	PA-04	March 4, 1925	4th term	Left the House in 1933.
222	Godfrey G. Goodwin	R	MN-10	March 4, 1925	4th term	Died on February 16, 1933.
223	Robert A. Green	D	FL-02	March 4, 1925	4th term	
224	Fletcher Hale	R	NH-01	March 4, 1925	4th term	Died on October 22, 1931.
225	Butler B. Hare	D	SC-02	March 4, 1925	4th term	Left the House in 1933.
226	David Hogg	D	IN-12	March 4, 1925	4th term	Left the House in 1933.
227	Robert G. Houston	R	DE	March 4, 1925	4th term	Left the House in 1933.
228	Thomas A. Jenkins	R	OH-10	March 4, 1925	4th term	
229	William Richard Johnson	R	IL-13	March 4, 1925	4th term	Left the House in 1933.
230	Florence Prag Kahn	R	CA-04	March 4, 1925	4th term	
231	Bolivar E. Kemp	D	LA-06	March 4, 1925	4th term	
232	Frederick William Magrady	R	PA-17	March 4, 1925	4th term	Left the House in 1933.
233	Joseph William Martin Jr.	R	MA-15	March 4, 1925	4th term	
234	Thomas S. McMillan	D	SC-01	March 4, 1925	4th term	
235	William L. Nelson	D	MO-08	March 4, 1925; Previous service, 1919–1921.	5th term*	Left the House in 1933.
236	Mary Teresa Norton	D	NJ-12	March 4, 1925	4th term	
237	Samuel Rutherford	D	GA-06	March 4, 1925	4th term	Resigned on February 4, 1932.
238	Harcourt J. Pratt	R	NY-27	March 4, 1925	4th term	Left the House in 1933.
239	Andrew Lawrence Somers	D	NY-06	March 4, 1925	4th term	
240	Lloyd Thurston	R	IA-08	March 4, 1925	4th term	
241	Lindsay Carter Warren	D	NC-01	March 4, 1925	4th term	
242	William Madison Whittington	D	MS-03	March 4, 1925	4th term	
243	Edith Nourse Rogers	R	MA-05	June 30, 1925	4th term	
244	Joseph L. Hooper	R	MI-03	August 18, 1925	4th term	
245	Harry Lane Englebright	R	CA-02	August 31, 1926	4th term	
246	Richard J. Welch	R	CA-05	August 31, 1926	4th term	
247	John J. Cochran	D	MO-11	November 2, 1926	4th term	
248	Frederick W. Dallinger	R	MA-08	November 2, 1926; Previous service, 1915–1925.	9th term*	Resigned on October 1, 1932.
249	Frank P. Bohn	R	MI-11	March 4, 1927	3rd term	Left the House in 1933.
250	John T. Buckbee	R	IL-12	March 4, 1927	3rd term	
251	Patrick J. Carley	D	NY-08	March 4, 1927	3rd term	
252	Wilburn Cartwright	D	OK-03	March 4, 1927	3rd term	
253	James Mitchell Chase	R	PA-23	March 4, 1927	3rd term	Left the House in 1933.
254	Robert H. Clancy	R	MI-01	March 4, 1927; Previous service, 1923–1925.	4th term*	Left the House in 1933.
255	John D. Clarke	R	NY-34	March 4, 1927; Previous service, 1921–1925.	5th term*	
256	Joe Crail	R	CA-10	March 4, 1927	3rd term	Left the House in 1933.
257	Thomas Cunningham Cochran	R	PA-28	March 4, 1927	3rd term	
258	Lewis Williams Douglas	D	AZ	March 4, 1927	3rd term	Left the House in 1933.
259	Isaac Hoffer Doutrich	R	PA-19	March 4, 1927	3rd term	
260	Harry Allison Estep	R	PA-35	March 4, 1927	3rd term	Left the House in 1933.
261	William E. Evans	R	CA-09	March 4, 1927	3rd term	
262	James M. Fitzpatrick	D	NY-24	March 4, 1927	3rd term	
263	William Voris Gregory	D	KY-01	March 4, 1927	3rd term	
264	Ulysses Samuel Guyer	R	KS-02	March 4, 1927; Previous service, 1924–1925.	4th term*	
265	Homer W. Hall	R	IL-17	March 4, 1927	3rd term	Left the House in 1933.
266	Clifford R. Hope	R	KS-07	March 4, 1927	3rd term	
267	Charles A. Kading	R	WI-02	March 4, 1927	3rd term	Left the House in 1933.
268	James Russell Leech	R	PA-20	March 4, 1927	3rd term	Resigned on January 29, 1932.
269	James T. Igoe	D	IL-06	March 4, 1927	3rd term	Left the House in 1933.
270	Jed Johnson	D	OK-06	March 4, 1927	3rd term	
271	Melvin Maas	R	MN-04	March 4, 1927	3rd term	Left the House in 1933.
272	Henry F. Niedringhaus	R	MO-10	March 4, 1927	3rd term	Left the House in 1933.
273	Vincent Luke Palmisano	D	MD-03	March 4, 1927	3rd term	
274	Conrad Selvig	R	MN-09	March 4, 1927	3rd term	Left the House in 1933.
275	William I. Sirovich	D	NY-14	March 4, 1927	3rd term	
276	J. Howard Swick	R	PA-26	March 4, 1927	3rd term	
277	Malcolm C. Tarver	D	GA-07	March 4, 1927	3rd term	
278	Charles A. Wolverton	R	NJ-01	March 4, 1927	3rd term	
279	Tom A. Yon	D	FL-03	March 4, 1927	3rd term	Left the House in 1933.
280	René L. De Rouen	D	LA-07	August 23, 1927	3rd term	
281	James M. Beck	R	PA-01	November 8, 1927	3rd term	
282	Clarence E. Hancock	R	NY-35	November 8, 1927	3rd term	
283	Robert R. Butler	R	OR-02	November 6, 1928	3rd term	Died on January 7, 1933.
284	Francis D. Culkin	R	NY-32	November 6, 1928	3rd term	
285	John William McCormack	D	MA-12	November 6, 1928	3rd term	
286	LaFayette L. Patterson	D	AL-05	November 6, 1928	3rd term	Left the House in 1933.
287	Richard B. Wigglesworth	R	MA-14	November 6, 1928	3rd term	
288	James Wolfenden	R	PA-08	November 6, 1928	3rd term	
289	David W. Hopkins	R	MO-04	February 5, 1929	3rd term	Left the House in 1933.
290	Chester C. Bolton	R	OH-22	March 4, 1929	2nd term	
291	George F. Brumm	R	PA-13	March 4, 1929; Previous service, 1923–1927.	4th term*	
292	William F. Brunner	D	NY-02	March 4, 1929	2nd term	
293	Ed H. Campbell	R	IA-11	March 4, 1929	2nd term	Left the House in 1933.
294	Vincent Carter	R	WY	March 4, 1929	2nd term	
295	J. Bayard Clark	D	NC-06	March 4, 1929	2nd term	
296	Victor Christgau	R	MN-01	March 4, 1929	2nd term	Left the House in 1933.
297	Edmund F. Cooke	R	NY-41	March 4, 1929	2nd term	Left the House in 1933.
298	Jere Cooper	D	TN-09	March 4, 1929	2nd term	
299	William R. Coyle	R	PA-30	March 4, 1929; Previous service, 1925–1927.	3rd term*	Left the House in 1933.
300	Oliver H. Cross	D	TX-11	March 4, 1929	2nd term	
301	Wall Doxey	D	MS-02	March 4, 1929	2nd term	
302	Oscar Stanton De Priest	R	IL-01	March 4, 1929	2nd term	
303	William R. Eaton	R	CO-01	March 4, 1929	2nd term	Left the House in 1933.
304	Claude A. Fuller	D	AR-03	March 4, 1929	2nd term	
305	David Delano Glover	D	AR-06	March 4, 1929	2nd term	
306	John L. Cable	R	OH-04	March 4, 1929; Previous service, 1921–1925.	4th term*	Left the House in 1933.
307	Robert S. Hall	D	MS-06	March 4, 1929	2nd term	Left the House in 1933.
308	Fred A. Hartley	R	NJ-08	March 4, 1929	2nd term	
309	William E. Hess	R	OH-02	March 4, 1929	2nd term	
310	William P. Lambertson	R	KS-01	March 4, 1929	2nd term	
311	Menalcus Lankford	R	VA-02	March 4, 1929	2nd term	Left the House in 1933.
312	Louis Ludlow	D	IN-07	March 4, 1929	2nd term	
313	Charles B. McClintock	R	OH-16	March 4, 1929	2nd term	Left the House in 1933.
314	Grant E. Mouser Jr.	R	OH-08	March 4, 1929	2nd term	Left the House in 1933.
315	Ruth Bryan Owen	D	FL-04	March 4, 1929	2nd term	Left the House in 1933.
316	Wright Patman	D	TX-01	March 4, 1929	2nd term	
317	William Alvin Pittenger	R	MN-08	March 4, 1929	2nd term	Left the House in 1933.
318	Ruth Baker Pratt	R	NY-17	March 4, 1929	2nd term	Left the House in 1933.
319	Francis Seiberling	R	OH-14	March 4, 1929	2nd term	Left the House in 1933.
320	Hugh Ike Shott	R	WV-05	March 4, 1929	2nd term	Left the House in 1933.
321	Joe L. Smith	D	WV-06	March 4, 1929	2nd term	
322	Donald F. Snow	R	ME-04	March 4, 1929	2nd term	Left the House in 1933.
323	Charles I. Sparks	R	KS-06	March 4, 1929	2nd term	Left the House in 1933.
324	William H. Stafford	R	WI-05	March 4, 1929; Previous service, 1903–1911, 1913–1919 and 1921–1923.	10th term***	Left the House in 1933.
325	Patrick J. Sullivan	R	PA-34	March 4, 1929	2nd term	Left the House in 1933.
326	Charles Edward Swanson	R	IA-09	March 4, 1929	2nd term	Left the House in 1933.
327	James L. Whitley	R	NY-38	March 4, 1929	2nd term	
328	John William Moore	D	KY-03	June 1, 1929; Previous service, 1925–1929.	4th term*	Left the House in 1933.
329	Charles Murray Turpin	R	PA-12	June 4, 1929	2nd term	
330	William I. Nolan	R	MN-05	July 17, 1929	2nd term	Left the House in 1933.
331	Numa F. Montet	D	LA-03	August 6, 1929	2nd term	
332	Robert Ramspeck	D	GA-05	October 2, 1929	2nd term	
333	Paul John Kvale	R	MN-07	October 16, 1929	2nd term	
334	Joseph A. Gavagan	D	NY-21	November 5, 1929	2nd term	
335	J. Roland Kinzer	R	PA-10	January 28, 1930	2nd term	
336	Harry M. Wurzbach	R	TX-14	February 10, 1930; Previous service, 1921–1929.	6th term*	Died on November 6, 1931.
337	William J. Granfield	D	MA-02	February 11, 1930	2nd term	
338	Charles Finley	R	KY-11	February 15, 1930	2nd term	Left the House in 1933.
339	Martin J. Kennedy	D	NY-18	April 11, 1930	2nd term	
340	Thomas L. Blanton	D	TX-17	May 20, 1930; Previous service, 1917–1929.	8th term*	
341	Burnett M. Chiperfield	R	IL-15	November 4, 1930; Previous service, 1915–1917.	3rd term*	Left the House in 1933.
342	Francis B. Condon	D	RI-03	November 4, 1930	2nd term	
343	Edmund F. Erk	R	PA-32	November 4, 1930	2nd term	Left the House in 1933.
344	Edward W. Goss	R	CT-05	November 4, 1930	2nd term	
345	Franklin Wills Hancock Jr.	D	NC-05	November 4, 1930	2nd term	
346	Robert Lynn Hogg	R	WV-04	November 4, 1930	2nd term	Left the House in 1933.
347	Frederick C. Loofbourow	R	UT-02	November 4, 1930	2nd term	Left the House in 1933.
348	Claude V. Parsons	D	IL-24	November 4, 1930	2nd term	
349	Michael Reilly	D	WI-06	November 4, 1930; Previous service, 1913–1917.	4th term*	
350	Robert F. Rich	R	PA-16	November 4, 1930	2nd term	
351	Effiegene Locke Wingo	D	AR-04	November 4, 1930	2nd term	Left the House in 1933.
352	Stephen A. Rudd	D	NY-09	February 17, 1931	2nd term	
353	Walter G. Andrews	R	NY-40	March 4, 1931	1st term	
354	Howard M. Baldrige	R	NE-02	March 4, 1931	1st term	Left the House in 1933.
355	William Edward Barton	D	MO-16	March 4, 1931	1st term	Left the House in 1933.
356	Harry P. Beam	D	IL-04	March 4, 1931	1st term	
357	John W. Boehne Jr.	D	IN-01	March 4, 1931	1st term	
358	Gerald J. Boileau	R	WI-08	March 4, 1931	1st term	
359	Patrick J. Boland	D	PA-11	March 4, 1931	1st term	
360	Alfred L. Bulwinkle	D	NC-09	March 4, 1931; Previous service, 1921–1929.	5th term*	
361	Thomas G. Burch	D	VA-05	March 4, 1931	1st term	
362	Cap R. Carden	D	KY-04	March 4, 1931	1st term	
363	Glover H. Cary	D	KY-02	March 4, 1931	1st term	
364	Peter Angelo Cavicchia	R	NJ-09	March 4, 1931	1st term	
365	Virgil Chapman	D	KY-07	March 4, 1931; Previous service, 1925–1929.	3rd term*	
366	Dennis Chavez	D	NM	March 4, 1931	1st term	
367	Eugene B. Crowe	D	IN-03	March 4, 1931	1st term	
368	William Purington Cole Jr.	D	MD-02	March 4, 1931; Previous service, 1927–1929.	2nd term*	
369	E. H. Crump	D	TN-10	March 4, 1931	1st term	
370	Charles F. Curry Jr.	R	CA-03	March 4, 1931	1st term	Left the House in 1933.
371	Clement C. Dickinson	D	MO-06	March 4, 1931; Previous service, 1910–1921 and 1923–1929.	10th term**	
372	William H. Dieterich	D	IL	March 4, 1931	1st term	Left the House in 1933.
373	Martin Dies Jr.	D	TX-02	March 4, 1931	1st term	
374	Wesley Ernest Disney	D	OK-01	March 4, 1931	1st term	
375	Joachim O. Fernández	D	LA-01	March 4, 1931	1st term	
376	William L. Fiesinger	D	OH-13	March 4, 1931	1st term	
377	John W. Fishburne	D	VA-07	March 4, 1931	1st term	Left the House in 1933.
378	John W. Flannagan Jr.	D	VA-09	March 4, 1931	1st term	
379	James F. Fulbright	D	MO-14	March 4, 1931; Previous service, 1923–1925 and 1927–1929.	3rd term**	Left the House in 1933.
380	Ralph Waldo Emerson Gilbert	D	KY-08	March 4, 1931; Previous service, 1921–1929.	5th term*	Left the House in 1933.
381	Fred C. Gilchrist	R	IA-10	March 4, 1931	1st term	
382	Courtland C. Gillen	D	IN-05	March 4, 1931	1st term	Left the House in 1933.
383	Peter C. Granata	R	IL-08	March 4, 1931	1st term	Resigned on April 5, 1932.
384	Glenn Griswold	D	IN-11	March 4, 1931	1st term	
385	Harry L. Haines	D	PA-22	March 4, 1931	1st term	
386	Byron B. Harlan	D	OH-03	March 4, 1931	1st term	
387	Pehr G. Holmes	R	MA-04	March 4, 1931	1st term	
388	Lynn Hornor	D	WV-03	March 4, 1931	1st term	
389	Ralph Horr	R	WA-01	March 4, 1931	1st term	Left the House in 1933.
390	Bernhard M. Jacobsen	D	IA-02	March 4, 1931	1st term	
391	Charles A. Karch	D	IL-22	March 4, 1931	1st term	Died on November 6, 1932.
392	Kent E. Keller	D	IL-25	March 4, 1931	1st term	
393	Edward A. Kelly	D	IL-03	March 4, 1931	1st term	
394	Frank C. Kniffin	D	OH-05	March 4, 1931	1st term	
395	Walter Lambeth	D	NC-07	March 4, 1931	1st term	
396	Arthur P. Lamneck	D	OH-12	March 4, 1931	1st term	
397	William Larrabee	D	IN-06	March 4, 1931	1st term	
398	David John Lewis	D	MD-06	March 4, 1931; Previous service, 1911–1917.	4th term*	
399	Norton Lewis Lichtenwalner	D	PA-14	March 4, 1931	1st term	Left the House in 1933.
400	Augustine Lonergan	D	CT-01	March 4, 1931; Previous service, 1913–1915 and 1917–1921.	4th term**	Left the House in 1933.
401	Oscar Lovette	R	TN-01	March 4, 1931	1st term	Left the House in 1933.
402	James Earl Major	D	IL-21	March 4, 1931; Previous service, 1923–1925 and 1927–1929.	3rd term**	
403	Samuel C. Major	D	MO-07	March 4, 1931; Previous service, 1919–1921 and 1923–1929.	6th term**	Died on July 28, 1931.
404	Paul H. Maloney	D	LA-02	March 4, 1931	1st term	
405	Charles Martin	D	OR-03	March 4, 1931	1st term	
406	Andrew J. May	D	KY-10	March 4, 1931	1st term	
407	Harold C. McGugin	R	KS-03	March 4, 1931	1st term	
408	Charles D. Millard	R	NY-25	March 4, 1931	1st term	
409	John E. Miller	D	AR-02	March 4, 1931	1st term	
410	John Ridley Mitchell	D	TN-04	March 4, 1931	1st term	
411	John N. Norton	D	NE-04	March 4, 1931; Previous service, 1927–1929.	2nd term*	Left the House in 1933.
412	Matthew Vincent O'Malley	D	NY-07	March 4, 1931	1st term	Died on May 26, 1931.
413	Donald B. Partridge	R	ME-02	March 4, 1931	1st term	Left the House in 1933.
414	Seymour H. Person	R	MI-06	March 4, 1931	1st term	Left the House in 1933.
415	Samuel B. Pettengill	D	IN-13	March 4, 1931	1st term	
416	James G. Polk	D	OH-06	March 4, 1931	1st term	
417	Leonard W. Schuetz	D	IL-07	March 4, 1931	1st term	
418	Ashton C. Shallenberger	D	NE-05	March 4, 1931; Previous service, 1901–1903, 1915–1919 and 1923–1929.	7th term***	
419	Joe Shannon	D	MO-05	March 4, 1931	1st term	
420	Howard W. Smith	D	VA-08	March 4, 1931	1st term	
421	Brent Spence	D	KY-06	March 4, 1931	1st term	
422	William H. Sutphin	D	NJ-03	March 4, 1931	1st term	
423	Fletcher B. Swank	D	OK-05	March 4, 1931; Previous service, 1921–1929.	5th term*	
424	R. Ewing Thomason	D	TX-16	March 4, 1931	1st term	
425	William L. Tierney	D	CT-04	March 4, 1931	1st term	Left the House in 1933.
426	Fred M. Vinson	D	KY-09	March 4, 1931; Previous service, 1924–1929.	4th term*	
427	Zebulon Weaver	D	NC-10	March 4, 1931; Previous service, 1917–1919 and 1919–1929.	7th term**	
428	John E. Weeks	R	VT-01	March 4, 1931	1st term	Left the House in 1933.
429	Charles F. West	D	OH-17	March 4, 1931	1st term	
430	Wilbur M. White	R	OH-09	March 4, 1931	1st term	Left the House in 1933.
431	Clyde Williams	D	MO-13	March 4, 1931; Previous service, 1927–1929.	2nd term*	
432	Gardner R. Withrow	R	WI-07	March 4, 1931	1st term	
433	Jesse P. Wolcott	R	MI-07	March 4, 1931	1st term	
434	John Stephens Wood	D	GA-09	March 4, 1931	1st term	
	John H. Overton	D	LA-08	May 12, 1931	1st term	Left the House in 1933.
	Homer C. Parker	D	GA-01	September 9, 1931	1st term	
	Robert Davis Johnson	D	MO-07	September 29, 1931	1st term	Left the House in 1933.
	Thomas Ryum Amlie	R	WI-01	October 13, 1931	1st term	Left the House in 1933.
	John J. Delaney	D	NY-07	November 3, 1931; Previous service, 1918–1919.	2nd term*	
	Michael J. Hart	D	MI-08	November 3, 1931	1st term	
	John B. Hollister	R	OH-01	November 3, 1931	1st term	
	Edward L. Stokes	R	PA-02	November 3, 1931	1st term	
	Martin L. Sweeney	D	OH-20	November 3, 1931	1st term	
	Richard M. Kleberg	D	TX-14	November 24, 1931	1st term	
	Percy Hamilton Stewart	D	NJ-05	December 1, 1931	1st term	Left the House in 1933.
	William Nathaniel Rogers	D	NH-01	January 5, 1932; Previous service, 1923–1925.	2nd term*	
	Carlton Mobley	D	GA-06	March 2, 1932	1st term	Left the House in 1933.
	Lawrence R. Ellzey	D	MS-07	March 15, 1932	1st term	
	Stanley H. Kunz	D	IL-08	April 5, 1932; Previous service, 1921–1931.	6th term*	Left the House in 1933.
	Howard William Stull	R	PA-20	April 26, 1932	1st term	Left the House in 1933.
	Willa McCord Blake Eslick	D	TN-07	August 13, 1932	1st term	Left the House in 1933.
	Joseph Franklin Biddle	R	PA-18	November 8, 1932	1st term	Left the House in 1933.
	Bryant Thomas Castellow	D	GA-03	November 8, 1932	1st term	
	Robert Lee Davis	R	PA-06	November 8, 1932	1st term	Left the House in 1933.
	Joel West Flood	D	VA-10	November 8, 1932	1st term	Left the House in 1933.
	Ambrose Jerome Kennedy	D	MD-04	November 8, 1932	1st term	
	Joe H. Eagle	D	TX-08	January 28, 1933; Previous service, 1913–1921.	5th term*	

== Delegates ==
Rank	Delegate	Party	District	Seniority date (Previous service, if any)	No.# of term(s)	Notes
1	Félix Córdova Dávila		PR	August 7, 1917	8th term	
2	Pedro Guevara	Nac	PHL	March 4, 1923	5th term	
3	Victor S. K. Houston	R	HI	March 4, 1927	3rd term	
4	Camilo Osías	Nac	PHL	March 4, 1929	2nd term	
5	James Wickersham	R	AK	March 4, 1931; Previous service, 1909–1917, 1919 and 1921.	7th term***	
6	José Lorenzo Pesquera	Ind.	PR	April 15, 1932	1st term	

== See also ==
- 72nd United States Congress
- List of United States congressional districts
- List of United States senators in the 72nd Congress
