= List of United States representatives in the 85th Congress =

This is a complete list of United States representatives during the 85th United States Congress listed by seniority.

As an historical article, the districts and party affiliations listed reflect those during the 85th Congress (January 3, 1957 – January 3, 1959). Seats and party affiliations on similar lists for other congresses will be different for certain members.

Seniority depends on the date on which members were sworn into office. Since many members are sworn in on the same day, subsequent ranking is based on previous congressional service of the individual and then by alphabetical order by the last name of the representative.

Committee chairmanship in the House is often associated with seniority. However, party leadership is typically not associated with seniority.

Note: The "*" indicates that the representative/delegate may have served one or more non-consecutive terms while in the House of Representatives of the United States Congress.

== U.S. House seniority list ==
U.S. House seniority
Rank	Representative	Party	District	Seniority date (Previous service, if any)	No.# of term(s)	Notes
1	Sam Rayburn	D	TX-04	March 4, 1913	23rd term	Dean and Speaker of the House
2	Carl Vinson	D	GA-06	November 3, 1914	23rd term	
3	Daniel A. Reed	R	NY-43	March 4, 1919	20th term	
4	Clarence Cannon	D	MO-09	March 4, 1923	18th term	
5	Emanuel Celler	D	NY-11	March 4, 1923	18th term	
6	John Taber	R	NY-36	March 4, 1923	18th term	
7	Thomas A. Jenkins	R	OH-10	March 4, 1925	17th term	Left the House in 1959.
8	Joseph William Martin Jr.	R	MA-14	March 4, 1925	17th term	
9	Edith Nourse Rogers	R	MA-05	June 30, 1925	17th term	
10	Charles A. Wolverton	R	NJ-01	March 4, 1927	16th term	Left the House in 1959.
11	John William McCormack	D	MA-12	November 6, 1928	16th term	
12	Richard B. Wigglesworth	R	MA-13	November 6, 1928	16th term	Resigned on November 13, 1958.
13	Jere Cooper	D	TN-08	March 4, 1929	15th term	Died on December 18, 1957.
14	Wright Patman	D	TX-01	March 4, 1929	15th term	
15	Howard W. Smith	D	VA-08	March 4, 1931	14th term	
16	Brent Spence	D	KY-05	March 4, 1931	14th term	
17	Leo E. Allen	R	IL-16	March 4, 1933	13th term	
18	William M. Colmer	D	MS-06	March 4, 1933	13th term	
19	Francis E. Walter	D	PA-15	March 4, 1933	13th term	
20	Paul Brown	D	GA-10	July 5, 1933	13th term	
21	Harold D. Cooley	D	NC-04	July 7, 1934	13th term	
22	Leslie C. Arends	R	IL-17	January 3, 1935	12th term	
23	August H. Andresen	R	MN-01	January 3, 1935; Previous service, 1925–1933.	16th term*	Died on January 14, 1958.
24	Graham A. Barden	D	NC-03	January 3, 1935	12th term	
25	Charles A. Buckley	D	NY-24	January 3, 1935	12th term	
26	W. Sterling Cole	R	NY-37	January 3, 1935	12th term	Resigned on December 1, 1957.
27	Clare Hoffman	R	MI-04	January 3, 1935	12th term	
28	George H. Mahon	D	TX-19	January 3, 1935	12th term	
29	Charles A. Halleck	R	IN-02	January 29, 1935	12th term	
30	Frank W. Boykin	D	AL-01	July 30, 1935	12th term	
31	Overton Brooks	D	LA-04	January 3, 1937	11th term	
32	Herman P. Eberharter	D	PA-28	January 3, 1937	11th term	Died on September 9, 1958.
33	Noble Jones Gregory	D	KY-01	January 3, 1937	11th term	Left the House in 1959.
34	Eugene James Keogh	D	NY-09	January 3, 1937	11th term	
35	Michael J. Kirwan	D	OH-19	January 3, 1937	11th term	
36	Noah M. Mason	R	IL-15	January 3, 1937	11th term	
37	William R. Poage	D	TX-11	January 3, 1937	11th term	
38	Edward Herbert Rees	R	KS-04	January 3, 1937	11th term	
39	Harry R. Sheppard	D	CA-27	January 3, 1937	11th term	
40	Albert Thomas	D	TX-08	January 3, 1937	11th term	
41	Richard M. Simpson	R	PA-18	May 11, 1937	11th term	
42	George M. Grant	D	AL-02	June 14, 1938	11th term	
43	Herman Carl Andersen	R	MN-07	January 3, 1939	10th term	
44	Clarence J. Brown	R	OH-07	January 3, 1939	10th term	
45	Robert B. Chiperfield	R	IL-19	January 3, 1939	10th term	
46	Cliff Clevenger	R	OH-05	January 3, 1939	10th term	Left the House in 1959.
47	Carl T. Durham	D	NC-06	January 3, 1939	10th term	
48	Ivor D. Fenton	R	PA-12	January 3, 1939	10th term	
49	Ezekiel C. Gathings	D	AR-01	January 3, 1939	10th term	
50	Ben F. Jensen	R	IA-07	January 3, 1939	10th term	
51	Robert Kean	R	NJ-12	January 3, 1939	10th term	Left the House in 1959.
52	Paul J. Kilday	D	TX-20	January 3, 1939	10th term	
53	Karl M. LeCompte	R	IA-04	January 3, 1939	10th term	Left the House in 1959.
54	John L. McMillan	D	SC-06	January 3, 1939	10th term	
55	Wilbur Mills	D	AR-02	January 3, 1939	10th term	
56	William F. Norrell	D	AR-06	January 3, 1939	10th term	
57	Henry O. Talle	R	IA-02	January 3, 1939	10th term	Left the House in 1959.
58	John Martin Vorys	R	OH-12	January 3, 1939	10th term	Left the House in 1959.
59	Clarence E. Kilburn	R	NY-33	February 13, 1940	10th term	
60	Clifford Davis	D	TN-09	February 14, 1940	10th term	
61	Frances P. Bolton	R	OH-22	February 27, 1940	10th term	
62	J. Harry McGregor	R	OH-17	February 27, 1940	10th term	Died on October 7, 1958.
63	Herbert Covington Bonner	D	NC-01	November 5, 1940	10th term	
64	Gordon Canfield	R	NJ-08	January 3, 1941	9th term	
65	Paul Cunningham	R	IA-05	January 3, 1941	9th term	
66	Aime Forand	D	RI-01	January 3, 1941; Previous service, 1937–1939.	10th term*	
67	Oren Harris	D	AR-04	January 3, 1941	9th term	
68	Felix Edward Hébert	D	LA-01	January 3, 1941	9th term	
69	William S. Hill	R	CO-02	January 3, 1941	9th term	Left the House in 1959.
70	Augustine B. Kelley	D	PA-21	January 3, 1941	9th term	Died on November 20, 1957.
71	Joseph O'Hara	R	MN-02	January 3, 1941	9th term	Left the House in 1959.
72	L. Mendel Rivers	D	SC-01	January 3, 1941	9th term	
73	Earl Wilson	R	IN-09	January 3, 1941	9th term	Left the House in 1959.
74	Lawrence H. Smith	R	WI-01	August 29, 1941	9th term	Died on January 22, 1958.
75	Jamie Whitten	D	MS-02	November 4, 1941	9th term	
76	Thomas J. Lane	D	MA-07	December 30, 1941	9th term	
77	Cecil R. King	D	CA-17	August 25, 1942	9th term	
78	Thomas Abernethy	D	MS-01	January 3, 1943	8th term	
79	James C. Auchincloss	R	NJ-03	January 3, 1943	8th term	
80	William L. Dawson	D	IL-01	January 3, 1943	8th term	
81	Michael A. Feighan	D	OH-20	January 3, 1943	8th term	
82	O. C. Fisher	D	TX-21	January 3, 1943	8th term	
83	Leon H. Gavin	R	PA-23	January 3, 1943	8th term	
84	Thomas S. Gordon	D	IL-08	January 3, 1943	8th term	Left the House in 1959.
85	Robert Hale	R	ME-01	January 3, 1943	8th term	Left the House in 1959.
86	Brooks Hays	D	AR-05	January 3, 1943	8th term	Left the House in 1959.
87	Charles B. Hoeven	R	IA-08	January 3, 1943	8th term	
88	Chester E. Holifield	D	CA-19	January 3, 1943	8th term	
89	Hal Holmes	R	WA-04	January 3, 1943	8th term	Left the House in 1959.
90	Walt Horan	R	WA-05	January 3, 1943	8th term	
91	Walter Judd	R	MN-05	January 3, 1943	8th term	
92	Bernard W. Kearney	R	NY-32	January 3, 1943	8th term	Left the House in 1959.
93	Ray Madden	D	IN-01	January 3, 1943	8th term	
94	Chester Earl Merrow	R	NH-01	January 3, 1943	8th term	
95	Arthur L. Miller	R	NE-04	January 3, 1943	8th term	Left the House in 1959.
96	James H. Morrison	D	LA-06	January 3, 1943	8th term	
97	Tom J. Murray	D	TN-07	January 3, 1943	8th term	
98	Thomas J. O'Brien	D	IL-06	January 3, 1943; Previous service, 1933–1939.	11th term*	
99	Alvin O'Konski	R	WI-10	January 3, 1943	8th term	
100	Philip J. Philbin	D	MA-03	January 3, 1943	8th term	
101	Sid Simpson	R	IL-20	January 3, 1943	8th term	Died on October 26, 1958.
102	Dean P. Taylor	R	NY-31	January 3, 1943	8th term	
103	Charles W. Vursell	R	IL-23	January 3, 1943	8th term	Left the House in 1959.
104	W. Arthur Winstead	D	MS-05	January 3, 1943	8th term	
105	Clair Engle	D	CA-02	August 31, 1943	8th term	Left the House in 1959.
106	Errett P. Scrivner	R	KS-02	September 14, 1943	8th term	Left the House in 1959.
107	Samuel K. McConnell Jr.	R	PA-13	January 18, 1944	8th term	Resigned on September 1, 1957.
108	George W. Andrews	D	AL-03	March 14, 1944	8th term	
109	John J. Rooney	D	NY-14	June 6, 1944	8th term	
110	John W. Byrnes	R	WI-08	January 3, 1945	7th term	
111	Frank Chelf	D	KY-04	January 3, 1945	7th term	
112	Robert J. Corbett	R	PA-29	January 3, 1945; Previous service, 1939–1941.	8th term*	
113	George Hyde Fallon	D	MD-04	January 3, 1945	7th term	
114	James G. Fulton	R	PA-27	January 3, 1945	7th term	
115	Ralph W. Gwinn	R	NY-27	January 3, 1945	7th term	Left the House in 1959.
116	John W. Heselton	R	MA-01	January 3, 1945	7th term	Left the House in 1959.
117	Henry J. Latham	R	NY-04	January 3, 1945	7th term	Resigned on December 31, 1958.
118	Gordon L. McDonough	R	CA-15	January 3, 1945	7th term	
119	George Paul Miller	D	CA-08	January 3, 1945	7th term	
120	Thomas E. Morgan	D	PA-26	January 3, 1945	7th term	
121	Adam Clayton Powell Jr.	D	NY-16	January 3, 1945	7th term	
122	Charles Melvin Price	D	IL-24	January 3, 1945	7th term	
123	Albert Rains	D	AL-05	January 3, 1945	7th term	
124	Robert L. F. Sikes	D	FL-03	January 3, 1945; Previous service, 1941–1944.	9th term*	
125	James William Trimble	D	AR-03	January 3, 1945	7th term	
126	John E. Fogarty	D	RI-02	February 7, 1945; Previous service, 1941–1944	9th term*	
127	J. Vaughan Gary	D	VA-03	March 6, 1945	7th term	
128	A. Walter Norblad	R	OR-01	January 18, 1946	7th term	
129	Olin E. Teague	D	TX-06	August 24, 1946	7th term	
130	Burr Harrison	D	VA-07	November 5, 1946	7th term	
131	Carl Albert	D	OK-03	January 3, 1947	6th term	
132	John J. Allen Jr.	R	CA-07	January 3, 1947	6th term	Left the House in 1959.
133	John B. Bennett	R	MI-12	January 3, 1947; Previous service, 1943–1945.	7th term*	
134	John Blatnik	D	MN-08	January 3, 1947	6th term	
135	Hale Boggs	D	LA-02	January 3, 1947; Previous service, 1941–1943.	7th term*	
136	Omar Burleson	D	TX-17	January 3, 1947	6th term	
137	Frederic René Coudert Jr.	R	NY-17	January 3, 1947	6th term	Left the House in 1959.
138	Paul B. Dague	R	PA-09	January 3, 1947	6th term	
139	James C. Davis	D	GA-05	January 3, 1947	6th term	
140	Harold Donohue	D	MA-04	January 3, 1947	6th term	
141	Joe L. Evins	D	TN-04	January 3, 1947	6th term	
142	Katharine St. George	R	NY-28	January 3, 1947	6th term	
143	Porter Hardy Jr.	D	VA-02	January 3, 1947	6th term	
144	Donald L. Jackson	R	CA-16	January 3, 1947	6th term	
145	Frank M. Karsten	D	MO-01	January 3, 1947	6th term	
146	Carroll D. Kearns	R	PA-24	January 3, 1947	6th term	
147	Kenneth Keating	R	NY-38	January 3, 1947	6th term	Left the House in 1959.
148	Henderson Lovelace Lanham	D	GA-07	January 3, 1947	6th term	Died on November 10, 1957.
149	Edward Tylor Miller	R	MD-01	January 3, 1947	6th term	Left the House in 1959.
150	Otto Passman	D	LA-05	January 3, 1947	6th term	
151	James T. Patterson	R	CT-05	January 3, 1947	6th term	Left the House in 1959.
152	Prince Hulon Preston Jr.	D	GA-01	January 3, 1947	6th term	
153	R. Walter Riehlman	R	NY-35	January 3, 1947	6th term	
154	Antoni Sadlak	R	CT-06	January 3, 1947	6th term	Left the House in 1959.
155	Hugh Scott	R	PA-06	January 3, 1947; Previous service, 1941–1945.	8th term*	Left the House in 1959.
156	Wint Smith	R	KS-06	January 3, 1947	6th term	
157	Thor C. Tollefson	R	WA-06	January 3, 1947	6th term	
158	John Bell Williams	D	MS-04	January 3, 1947	6th term	
159	James E. Van Zandt	R	PA-20	January 3, 1947; Previous service, 1939–1943.	9th term*	
160	Robert E. Jones Jr.	D	AL-08	January 28, 1947	6th term	
161	Russell V. Mack	R	WA-03	July 7, 1947	6th term	
162	Edward Garmatz	D	MD-03	July 15, 1947	6th term	
163	Clark W. Thompson	D	TX-09	August 23, 1947; Previous service, 1933–1935.	7th term*	
164	Ralph Harvey	R	IN-10	November 4, 1947	6th term	Left the House in 1959.
165	William Moore McCulloch	R	OH-04	November 4, 1947	6th term	
166	Abraham J. Multer	D	NY-13	November 4, 1947	6th term	
167	Donald W. Nicholson	R	MA-09	November 18, 1947	6th term	Left the House in 1959.
168	Watkins Moorman Abbitt	D	VA-04	February 17, 1948	6th term	
169	Paul C. Jones	D	MO-10	November 2, 1948	6th term	
170	Hugh Joseph Addonizio	D	NJ-11	January 3, 1949	5th term	
171	Wayne N. Aspinall	D	CO-04	January 3, 1949	5th term	
172	Cleveland M. Bailey	D	WV-03	January 3, 1949; Previous service, 1945–1947.	6th term*	
173	William A. Barrett	D	PA-01	January 3, 1949; Previous service, 1945–1947.	6th term*	
174	Charles Edward Bennett	D	FL-02	January 3, 1949	5th term	
175	Richard Walker Bolling	D	MO-05	January 3, 1949	5th term	
176	Usher L. Burdick	R	ND	January 3, 1949; Previous service, 1935–1945.	10th term*	Left the House in 1959.
177	A. S. J. Carnahan	D	MO-08	January 3, 1949; Previous service, 1945–1947.	6th term*	
178	Earl Chudoff	D	PA-04	January 3, 1949	5th term	Resigned on January 5, 1958.
179	James J. Delaney	D	NY-07	January 3, 1949; Previous service, 1945–1947.	6th term*	
180	Isidore Dollinger	D	NY-23	January 3, 1949	5th term	
181	Clyde Doyle	D	CA-23	January 3, 1949; Previous service, 1945–1947.	6th term*	
182	Carl Elliott	D	AL-07	January 3, 1949	5th term	
183	Gerald Ford	R	MI-05	January 3, 1949	5th term	
184	James B. Frazier Jr.	D	TN-03	January 3, 1949	5th term	
185	William J. Green Jr.	D	PA-05	January 3, 1949; Previous service, 1945–1947.	6th term*	
186	H. R. Gross	R	IA-03	January 3, 1949	5th term	
187	Cecil M. Harden	R	IN-06	January 3, 1949	5th term	
188	Wayne Hays	D	OH-18	January 3, 1949	5th term	
189	Albert S. Herlong Jr.	D	FL-05	January 3, 1949	5th term	
190	Benjamin F. James	R	PA-07	January 3, 1949	5th term	Left the House in 1959.
191	Peter F. Mack Jr.	D	IL-21	January 3, 1949	5th term	
192	Fred Marshall	D	MN-06	January 3, 1949	5th term	
193	Eugene McCarthy	D	MN-04	January 3, 1949	5th term	Left the House in 1959.
194	Morgan M. Moulder	D	MO-11	January 3, 1949	5th term	
195	Carl D. Perkins	D	KY-07	January 3, 1949	5th term	
196	James G. Polk	D	OH-06	January 3, 1949; Previous service, 1931–1941.	10th term*	
197	Louis C. Rabaut	D	MI-14	January 3, 1949; Previous service, 1935–1947.	11th term*	
198	George M. Rhodes	D	PA-14	January 3, 1949	5th term	
199	Peter W. Rodino	D	NJ-10	January 3, 1949	5th term	
200	Hubert B. Scudder	R	CA-01	January 3, 1949	5th term	Left the House in 1959.
201	Harley Orrin Staggers	D	WV-02	January 3, 1949	5th term	
202	Tom Steed	D	OK-04	January 3, 1949	5th term	
203	Homer Thornberry	D	TX-10	January 3, 1949	5th term	
204	Gardner R. Withrow	R	WI-03	January 3, 1949; Previous service, 1931–1939.	9th term*	
205	Roy Wier	D	MN-03	January 3, 1949	5th term	
206	Edwin E. Willis	D	LA-03	January 3, 1949	5th term	
207	Sidney R. Yates	D	IL-09	January 3, 1949	5th term	
208	Clement J. Zablocki	D	WI-04	January 3, 1949	5th term	
209	John P. Saylor	R	PA-22	September 13, 1949	5th term	
210	Edna F. Kelly	D	NY-10	November 8, 1949	5th term	
211	John F. Shelley	D	CA-05	November 8, 1949	5th term	
212	William B. Widnall	R	NJ-07	February 6, 1950	5th term	
213	William H. Bates	R	MA-06	February 14, 1950	5th term	
214	Edward J. Robeson Jr.	D	VA-01	May 2, 1950	5th term	Left the House in 1959.
215	Myron V. George	R	KS-03	November 7, 1950	5th term	Left the House in 1959.
216	E. Ross Adair	R	IN-04	January 3, 1951	4th term	
217	William Hanes Ayres	R	OH-14	January 3, 1951	4th term	
218	Howard Baker Sr.	R	TN-02	January 3, 1951	4th term	
219	John V. Beamer	R	IN-05	January 3, 1951	4th term	Left the House in 1959.
220	Page Belcher	R	OK-01	January 3, 1951	4th term	
221	Ellis Yarnal Berry	R	SD-02	January 3, 1951	4th term	
222	Jackson Edward Betts	R	OH-08	January 3, 1951	4th term	
223	Frank T. Bow	R	OH-16	January 3, 1951	4th term	
224	William G. Bray	R	IN-07	January 3, 1951	4th term	
225	Horace Seely-Brown Jr.	R	CT-02	January 3, 1951; Previous service, 1947–1949.	5th term*	Left the House in 1959.
226	Charles B. Brownson	R	IN-11	January 3, 1951	4th term	Left the House in 1959.
227	Hamer H. Budge	R	ID-02	January 3, 1951	4th term	
228	Alvin Bush	R	PA-17	January 3, 1951	4th term	
229	John Chenoweth	R	CO-03	January 3, 1951; Previous service, 1941–1949.	8th term*	
230	Marguerite S. Church	R	IL-13	January 3, 1951	4th term	
231	Thomas B. Curtis	R	MO-02	January 3, 1951	4th term	
232	John J. Dempsey	D	NM	January 3, 1951; Previous service, 1935–1941.	7th term*	Died on March 11, 1958.
233	James Devereux	R	MD-02	January 3, 1951	4th term	Left the House in 1959.
234	William Jennings Bryan Dorn	D	SC-03	January 3, 1951; Previous service, 1947–1949.	5th term*	
235	Tic Forrester	D	GA-03	January 3, 1951	4th term	
236	William E. Hess	R	OH-02	January 3, 1951; Previous service, 1929–1937 and 1939–1949.	13th term**	
237	Patrick J. Hillings	R	CA-25	January 3, 1951	4th term	Left the House in 1959.
238	John Jarman	D	OK-05	January 3, 1951	4th term	
239	John C. Kluczynski	D	IL-05	January 3, 1951	4th term	
240	John Lesinski Jr.	D	MI-16	January 3, 1951	4th term	
241	Thaddeus M. Machrowicz	D	MI-01	January 3, 1951	4th term	
242	George Meader	R	MI-02	January 3, 1951	4th term	
243	William E. McVey	R	IL-04	January 3, 1951	4th term	Died on August 10, 1958.
244	William E. Miller	R	NY-40	January 3, 1951	4th term	
245	Albert P. Morano	R	CT-04	January 3, 1951	4th term	Left the House in 1959.
246	Walter M. Mumma	R	PA-16	January 3, 1951	4th term	
247	Harold C. Ostertag	R	NY-39	January 3, 1951	4th term	
248	Winston L. Prouty	R	VT	January 3, 1951	4th term	Left the House in 1959.
249	Edmund P. Radwan	R	NY-41	January 3, 1951	4th term	Left the House in 1959.
250	B. Carroll Reece	R	TN-01	January 3, 1951; Previous service, 1921–1931 and 1933–1947.	16th term**	
251	John J. Riley	D	SC-02	January 3, 1951; Previous service, 1945–1949.	6th term*	
252	Kenneth A. Roberts	D	AL-04	January 3, 1951	4th term	
253	Byron G. Rogers	D	CO-01	January 3, 1951	4th term	
254	Walter E. Rogers	D	TX-18	January 3, 1951	4th term	
255	Timothy P. Sheehan	R	IL-11	January 3, 1951	4th term	Left the House in 1959.
256	Alfred Dennis Sieminski	D	NJ-13	January 3, 1951	4th term	Left the House in 1959.
257	Frank E. Smith	D	MS-03	January 3, 1951	4th term	
258	William L. Springer	R	IL-22	January 3, 1951	4th term	
259	William Van Pelt	R	WI-06	January 3, 1951	4th term	
260	J. Ernest Wharton	R	NY-29	January 3, 1951	4th term	
261	William R. Williams	R	NY-34	January 3, 1951	4th term	Left the House in 1959.
262	John C. Watts	D	KY-06	April 4, 1951	4th term	
263	Elizabeth Kee	D	WV-05	July 17, 1951	4th term	
264	Frank N. Ikard	D	TX-13	September 8, 1951	4th term	
265	Clifford McIntire	R	ME-03	October 22, 1951	4th term	
266	Joseph L. Carrigg	R	PA-10	November 6, 1951	4th term	Left the House in 1959.
267	Frank C. Osmers Jr.	R	NJ-09	November 6, 1951; Previous service, 1939–1943.	6th term*	
268	Paul F. Schenck	R	OH-03	November 6, 1951	4th term	
269	Robert Dinsmore Harrison	R	NE-03	December 4, 1951	4th term	Left the House in 1959.
270	Leo W. O'Brien	D	NY-30	April 1, 1952	4th term	
271	John Dowdy	D	TX-07	September 23, 1952	4th term	
272	Hugh Quincy Alexander	D	NC-09	January 3, 1953	3rd term	
273	Frank J. Becker	R	NY-03	January 3, 1953	3rd term	
274	Albert H. Bosch	R	NY-05	January 3, 1953	3rd term	
275	Alvin Morell Bentley	R	MI-08	January 3, 1953	3rd term	
276	Edward Boland	D	MA-02	January 3, 1953	3rd term	
277	Jack Brooks	D	TX-02	January 3, 1953	3rd term	
278	Joel Broyhill	R	VA-10	January 3, 1953	3rd term	
279	Robert Byrd	D	WV-06	January 3, 1953	3rd term	Left the House in 1959.
280	James A. Byrne	D	PA-03	January 3, 1953	3rd term	
281	Elford Albin Cederberg	R	MI-10	January 3, 1953	3rd term	
282	Albert W. Cretella	R	CT-03	January 3, 1953	3rd term	Left the House in 1959.
283	Laurence Curtis	R	MA-10	January 3, 1953	3rd term	
284	William A. Dawson	R	UT-02	January 3, 1953; Previous service, 1947–1949.	4th term*	Left the House in 1959.
285	Steven Derounian	R	NY-02	January 3, 1953	3rd term	
286	Martin Dies Jr.	D	TX	January 3, 1953; Previous service, 1931–1945.	10th term*	Left the House in 1959.
287	Francis E. Dorn	R	NY-12	January 3, 1953	3rd term	
288	Ed Edmondson	D	OK-02	January 3, 1953	3rd term	
289	Paul A. Fino	R	NY-25	January 3, 1953	3rd term	
290	Peter Frelinghuysen Jr.	R	NJ-05	January 3, 1953	3rd term	
291	Samuel Friedel	D	MD-07	January 3, 1953	3rd term	
292	Lawrence H. Fountain	D	NC-02	January 3, 1953	3rd term	
293	Charles S. Gubser	R	CA-10	January 3, 1953	3rd term	
294	Harlan Hagen	D	CA-14	January 3, 1953	3rd term	
295	James A. Haley	D	FL-07	January 3, 1953	3rd term	
296	Edgar W. Hiestand	R	CA-21	January 3, 1953	3rd term	
297	Joseph F. Holt	R	CA-22	January 3, 1953	3rd term	
298	Lester Holtzman	D	NY-06	January 3, 1953	3rd term	
299	Craig Hosmer	R	CA-18	January 3, 1953	3rd term	
300	DeWitt Hyde	R	MD-06	January 3, 1953	3rd term	Left the House in 1959.
301	Charles R. Jonas	R	NC-10	January 3, 1953	3rd term	
302	Victor A. Knox	R	MI-11	January 3, 1953	3rd term	
303	Otto Krueger	R	ND	January 3, 1953	3rd term	Left the House in 1959.
304	Melvin Laird	R	WI-07	January 3, 1953	3rd term	
305	Phillip M. Landrum	D	GA-09	January 3, 1953	3rd term	
306	George S. Long	D	LA-08	January 3, 1953	3rd term	Died on March 22, 1958.
307	Donald H. Magnuson	D	WA	January 3, 1953	3rd term	
308	William S. Mailliard	R	CA-04	January 3, 1953	3rd term	
309	Donald Ray Matthews	D	FL-08	January 3, 1953	3rd term	
310	Lee Metcalf	D	MT-01	January 3, 1953	3rd term	
311	John E. Moss	D	CA-03	January 3, 1953	3rd term	
312	Barratt O'Hara	D	IL-02	January 3, 1953; Previous service, 1949–1951.	4th term*	
313	Tip O'Neill	D	MA-11	January 3, 1953	3rd term	
314	Thomas Pelly	R	WA-01	January 3, 1953	3rd term	
315	Gracie Pfost	D	ID-01	January 3, 1953	3rd term	
316	John R. Pillion	R	NY-42	January 3, 1953	3rd term	
317	Richard Harding Poff	R	VA-06	January 3, 1953	3rd term	
318	John H. Ray	R	NY-15	January 3, 1953	3rd term	
319	John J. Rhodes	R	AZ-01	January 3, 1953	3rd term	
320	John M. Robsion Jr.	R	KY-03	January 3, 1953	3rd term	Left the House in 1959.
321	Gordon H. Scherer	R	OH-01	January 3, 1953	3rd term	
322	Armistead Selden	D	AL-06	January 3, 1953	3rd term	
323	George A. Shuford	D	NC-12	January 3, 1953	3rd term	Left the House in 1959.
324	Leonor Sullivan	D	MO-03	January 3, 1953	3rd term	
325	T. Ashton Thompson	D	LA-07	January 3, 1953	3rd term	
326	James B. Utt	R	CA-28	January 3, 1953	3rd term	
327	Stuyvesant Wainwright	R	NY-01	January 3, 1953	3rd term	
328	Jack Westland	R	WA-02	January 3, 1953	3rd term	
329	Basil Lee Whitener	D	NC-11	January 3, 1953	3rd term	
330	Bob Wilson	R	CA-30	January 3, 1953	3rd term	
331	J. Arthur Younger	R	CA-09	January 3, 1953	3rd term	
332	J. L. Pilcher	D	GA-02	February 4, 1953	3rd term	
333	William M. Tuck	D	VA-05	April 14, 1953	3rd term	
334	Robert T. Ashmore	D	SC-04	June 2, 1953	3rd term	
335	James Bowler	D	IL-07	July 7, 1953	3rd term	Died on July 18, 1957.
336	William Natcher	D	KY-02	August 1, 1953	3rd term	
337	Lester Johnson	D	WI-09	October 13, 1953	3rd term	
338	Glenard P. Lipscomb	R	CA-24	November 10, 1953	3rd term	
339	John James Flynt Jr.	D	GA-04	November 2, 1954	3rd term	
340	Bruce Alger	R	TX-05	January 3, 1955	2nd term	
341	Victor Anfuso	D	NY-08	January 3, 1955; Previous service, 1951–1953.	3rd term*	
342	Thomas W. L. Ashley	D	OH-09	January 3, 1955	2nd term	
343	William H. Avery	R	KS-01	January 3, 1955	2nd term	
344	John F. Baldwin Jr.	R	CA-06	January 3, 1955	2nd term	
345	Perkins Bass	R	NH-02	January 3, 1955	2nd term	
346	Ross Bass	D	TN-06	January 3, 1955	2nd term	
347	Albert David Baumhart Jr.	R	OH-13	January 3, 1955; Previous service, 1941–1942.	3rd term*	
348	Iris Faircloth Blitch	D	GA-08	January 3, 1955	2nd term	
349	Charles A. Boyle	D	IL-12	January 3, 1955	2nd term	
350	George H. Christopher	D	MO-04	January 3, 1955; Previous service, 1949–1951.	3rd term*	
351	Frank M. Clark	D	PA-25	January 3, 1955	2nd term	
352	William C. Cramer	R	FL-01	January 3, 1955	2nd term	
353	Winfield K. Denton	D	IN-08	January 3, 1955; Previous service, 1949–1953.	4th term*	
354	Charles Diggs	D	MI-13	January 3, 1955	2nd term	
355	Henry Aldous Dixon	R	UT-01	January 3, 1955	2nd term	
356	Dante Fascell	D	FL-04	January 3, 1955	2nd term	
357	Daniel J. Flood	D	PA-11	January 3, 1955; Previous service, 1945–1947 and 1949–1953.	5th term**	
358	Kenneth J. Gray	D	IL-25	January 3, 1955	2nd term	
359	Edith Green	D	OR-03	January 3, 1955	2nd term	
360	Martha Griffiths	D	MI-17	January 3, 1955	2nd term	
361	John E. Henderson	R	OH-15	January 3, 1955	2nd term	
362	George Huddleston Jr.	D	AL-09	January 3, 1955	2nd term	
363	William Raleigh Hull Jr.	D	MO-06	January 3, 1955	2nd term	
364	W. Pat Jennings	D	VA-09	January 3, 1955	2nd term	
365	August E. Johansen	R	MI-03	January 3, 1955	2nd term	
366	Joe M. Kilgore	D	TX-15	January 3, 1955	2nd term	
367	Coya Knutson	D	MN-09	January 3, 1955	2nd term	Left the House in 1959.
368	Richard Lankford	D	MD-05	January 3, 1955	2nd term	
369	Torbert Macdonald	D	MA-08	January 3, 1955	2nd term	
370	William Edwin Minshall Jr.	R	OH-23	January 3, 1955	2nd term	
371	Henry S. Reuss	D	WI-05	January 3, 1955	2nd term	
372	James Roosevelt	D	CA-26	January 3, 1955	2nd term	
373	J. T. Rutherford	D	TX-16	January 3, 1955	2nd term	
374	Fred Schwengel	R	IA-01	January 3, 1955	2nd term	
375	Eugene Siler	R	KY-08	January 3, 1955	2nd term	
376	Bernice F. Sisk	D	CA-12	January 3, 1955	2nd term	
377	Charles M. Teague	R	CA-13	January 3, 1955	2nd term	
378	Edwin Keith Thomson	R	WY	January 3, 1955	2nd term	
379	Frank Thompson	D	NJ-04	January 3, 1955	2nd term	
380	Stewart Udall	D	AZ-02	January 3, 1955	2nd term	
381	Charles Vanik	D	OH-21	January 3, 1955	2nd term	
382	Phillip Hart Weaver	R	NE-01	January 3, 1955	2nd term	
383	Jim Wright	D	TX-12	January 3, 1955	2nd term	
384	Herbert Zelenko	D	NY-21	January 3, 1955	2nd term	
385	Paul Rogers	D	FL-06	January 11, 1955	2nd term	
386	John Dingell	D	MI-15	December 13, 1955	2nd term	
387	Elmer J. Holland	D	PA-30	January 24, 1956; Previous service, 1942–1943.	3rd term*	
388	James C. Healey	D	NY-22	February 7, 1956	2nd term	
389	Kathryn E. Granahan	D	PA-02	November 6, 1956	2nd term	
390	LeRoy H. Anderson	D	MT-02	January 3, 1957	1st term	
391	Walter S. Baring Jr.	D	NV	January 3, 1957; Previous service, 1949–1953.	3rd term*	
392	Lindley Beckworth	D	TX-03	January 3, 1957; Previous service, 1939–1953.	8th term*	
393	James Floyd Breeding	D	KS-05	January 3, 1957	1st term	
394	William Broomfield	R	MI-18	January 3, 1957	1st term	
395	Charles Harrison Brown	D	MO-07	January 3, 1957	1st term	
396	Emmet Byrne	R	IL-03	January 3, 1957	1st term	Left the House in 1959.
397	Charles E. Chamberlain	R	MI-06	January 3, 1957	1st term	
398	Glenn Cunningham	R	NE-02	January 3, 1957	1st term	
399	Merwin Coad	D	IA-06	January 3, 1957	1st term	
400	Frank M. Coffin	D	ME-02	January 3, 1957	1st term	
401	Harold R. Collier	R	IL-10	January 3, 1957	1st term	
402	Willard S. Curtin	R	PA-08	January 3, 1957	1st term	
403	Vincent J. Dellay	R	NJ-14	January 3, 1957	1st term	Left the House in 1959.
404	David S. Dennison Jr.	R	OH-11	January 3, 1957	1st term	Left the House in 1959.
405	Edwin B. Dooley	R	NY-26	January 3, 1957	1st term	
406	Florence P. Dwyer	R	NJ-06	January 3, 1957	1st term	
407	Leonard Farbstein	D	NY-19	January 3, 1957	1st term	
408	Robert P. Griffin	R	MI-09	January 3, 1957	1st term	
409	Harry G. Haskell Jr.	R	DE	January 3, 1957	1st term	Left the House in 1959.
410	Robert W. Hemphill	D	SC-05	January 3, 1957	1st term	
411	Russell W. Keeney	R	IL-14	January 3, 1957	1st term	Died on January 11, 1958.
412	Alvin Paul Kitchin	D	NC-08	January 3, 1957	1st term	
413	Alton Lennon	D	NC-07	January 3, 1957	1st term	
414	Joseph Carlton Loser	D	TN-05	January 3, 1957	1st term	
415	Robert J. McIntosh	R	MI-07	January 3, 1957	1st term	Left the House in 1959.
416	Edwin H. May Jr.	R	CT-01	January 3, 1957	1st term	Left the House in 1959.
417	John J. McFall	D	CA-11	January 3, 1957	1st term	
418	George McGovern	D	SD-01	January 3, 1957	1st term	
419	Robert Michel	R	IL-18	January 3, 1957	1st term	
420	Arch A. Moore Jr.	R	WV-01	January 3, 1957	1st term	
421	Toby Morris	D	OK-06	January 3, 1957; Previous service, 1947–1953.	4th term*	
422	Will E. Neal	R	WV-04	January 3, 1957; Previous service, 1953–1955.	2nd term*	Left the House in 1959.
423	F. Jay Nimtz	R	IN-03	January 3, 1957	1st term	Left the House in 1959.
424	Charles O. Porter	D	OR-04	January 3, 1957	1st term	
425	Alfred E. Santangelo	D	NY-18	January 3, 1957	1st term	
426	Dalip Singh Saund	D	CA-29	January 3, 1957	1st term	
427	Ralph James Scott	D	NC-05	January 3, 1957	1st term	
428	H. Allen Smith	R	CA-20	January 3, 1957	1st term	
429	S. Walter Stauffer	R	PA-19	January 3, 1957; Previous service, 1953–1955.	2nd term*	Left the House in 1959.
430	Ludwig Teller	D	NY-20	January 3, 1957	1st term	
431	Donald Edgar Tewes	R	WI-02	January 3, 1957	1st term	Left the House in 1959.
432	Al Ullman	D	OR-02	January 3, 1957	1st term	
433	John Andrew Young	D	TX-14	January 3, 1957	1st term	
	Joseph Montoya	D	NM	April 9, 1957	1st term	
	Milton W. Glenn	R	NJ-02	November 5, 1957	1st term	
	John A. Lafore Jr.	R	PA-13	November 5, 1957	1st term	
	Roland V. Libonati	D	IL-07	December 31, 1957	1st term	
	Harlan Erwin Mitchell	D	GA-07	January 8, 1958	1st term	
	Howard W. Robison	R	NY-37	January 14, 1958	1st term	
	John Herman Dent	D	PA-21	January 21, 1958	1st term	
	Fats Everett	D	TN-08	February 1, 1958	1st term	
	Al Quie	R	MN-01	February 18, 1958	1st term	
	Robert N.C. Nix Sr.	D	PA-04	May 20, 1958	1st term	

== Delegates ==
Rank	Delegate	Party	District	Seniority date (Previous service, if any)	No.# of term(s)	Notes
1	Bob Bartlett	D	AK	January 3, 1945	7th term	
2	Antonio Fernós-Isern	D	PR	September 11, 1946	7th term	
3	John A. Burns	D	HI	January 3, 1957	1st term	

== See also ==
- 85th United States Congress
- List of United States congressional districts
- List of United States senators in the 85th Congress
