= List of United States senators in the 85th Congress =

This is a complete list of United States senators during the 85th United States Congress listed by seniority from January 3, 1957, to January 3, 1959.

Order of service is based on the commencement of the senator's first term. Behind this is former service as a senator (only giving the senator seniority within their new incoming class), service as vice president, a House member, a cabinet secretary, or a governor of a state. The final factor is the population of the senator's state.

In this congress, J. William Fulbright (D-Arkansas) was the most senior junior senator and John Sherman Cooper (R-Kentucky) was the most junior senior senator.

Senators who were sworn in during the middle of the two-year congressional term (up until the last senator who was not sworn in early after winning the November 1958 election) are listed at the end of the list with no number.

== Terms of service ==
Class	Terms of service of senators that expired in years
Class 1	Terms of service of senators that expired in 1959 (AZ, CA, CT, DE, FL, IN, MA, MD, ME, MI, MN, MO, MS, MT, ND, NE, NJ, NM, NV, NY, OH, PA, RI, TN, TX, UT, VA, VT, WA, WI, WV, and WY.)
Class 2	Terms of service of senators that expired in 1961 (AL, AR, CO, DE, GA, IA, ID, IL, KS, KY, LA, MA, ME, MI, MN, MS, MT, NC, NE, NH, NJ, NM, OK, OR, RI, SC, SD, TN, TX, VA, WV, and WY.)
Class 3	Terms of service of senators that expired in 1963 (AL, AR, AZ, CA, CO, CT, FL, GA, ID, IL, IN, IA, KS, KY, LA, MD, MO, NC, ND, NH, NV, NY, OH, OK, OR, PA, SC, SD, UT, VT, WA, and WI.)

== U.S. Senate seniority list ==
U.S. Senate seniority
Rank	Senator (party-state)	Seniority date	Other factors
1	Carl Hayden (D-AZ)	March 4, 1927	
2	Richard Russell, Jr. (D-GA)	January 12, 1933	
3	Harry F. Byrd, Sr. (D-VA)	March 4, 1933	
4	James Murray (D-MT)	November 7, 1934	
5	Dennis Chavez (D-NM)	May 11, 1935	
6	Theodore F. Green (D-RI)	January 3, 1937	Former governor, Rhode Island 37th in population (1930)
7	Styles Bridges (R-NH)	January 3, 1937	Former governor, New Hampshire 41st in population (1930)
8	Allen J. Ellender (D-LA)	January 3, 1937	
9	Joseph L. Hill (D-AL)	January 11, 1938	
10	Alexander Wiley (R-WI)	January 3, 1939	
11	William Langer (R-ND)	January 3, 1941	
12	George Aiken (R-VT)	January 10, 1941	
13	James Eastland (D-MS)	January 3, 1943	Previously a senator
14	John Little McClellan (D-AR)	January 3, 1943	
15	Howard A. Smith (R-NJ)	December 7, 1944	
16	Warren G. Magnuson (D-WA)	December 14, 1944	
17	J. William Fulbright (D-AR)	January 3, 1945	Former representative
18	Bourke B. Hickenlooper (R-IA)	January 3, 1945	Former governor, Iowa 20th in population (1940)
19	Olin D. Johnston (D-SC)	January 3, 1945	Former governor, South Carolina 26th in population (1940)
20	Homer E. Capehart (R-IN)	January 3, 1945	Indiana 12th in population (1940)
21	Wayne Morse (D-OR)	January 3, 1945	Oregon 34th in population (1940)
22	Leverett Saltonstall (R-MA)	January 4, 1945	
23	Milton Young (R-ND)	March 12, 1945	
24	William F. Knowland (R-CA)	August 26, 1945	
25	Spessard Holland (D-FL)	September 24, 1946	
26	Ralph Flanders (R-VT)	November 1, 1946	
27	A. Willis Robertson (D-VA)	November 6, 1946	Former representative (13 years, 10 months)
28	John Sparkman (D-AL)	November 6, 1946	Former representative (9 years, 10 months)
29	William E. Jenner (R-IN)	January 3, 1947	Previously a senator
30	Edward Martin (R-PA)	January 3, 1947	Former governor, Pennsylvania 2nd in population (1940)
31	John W. Bricker (R-OH)	January 3, 1947	Former governor, Ohio 4th in population (1940)
32	Edward John Thye (R-MN)	January 3, 1947	Former governor, Minnesota 18th in population (1940)
33	Irving Ives (R-NY)	January 3, 1947	New York 1st in population (1940)
34	Joseph McCarthy (R-WI)	January 3, 1947	Wisconsin 13th in population (1940)
35	Arthur Vivian Watkins (R-UT)	January 3, 1947	Utah 40th in population (1940)
36	John J. Williams (R-DE)	January 3, 1947	Delaware 47th in population (1940)
37	George W. Malone (R-NV)	January 3, 1947	Nevada 48th in population (1940)
38	John C. Stennis (D-MS)	November 17, 1947	
39	Karl Mundt (R-SD)	December 31, 1948	Former representative
40	Russell B. Long (D-LA)	December 31, 1948	
41	Matthew M. Neely (D-WV)	January 3, 1949	Previously a senator
42	Lyndon Johnson (D-TX)	January 3, 1949	Former representative (12 years)
43	Estes Kefauver (D-TN)	January 3, 1949	Former representative (10 years)
44	Margaret Chase Smith (R-ME)	January 3, 1949	Former representative (8 years, 7 months)
45	Clinton Anderson (D-NM)	January 3, 1949	Former representative (4 years, 5 months)
46	Robert S. Kerr (D-OK)	January 3, 1949	Former governor, Oklahoma 22nd in population (1940)
47	Andrew F. Schoeppel (R-KS)	January 3, 1949	Former governor, Kansas 29th in population (1940)
48	Paul Douglas (D-IL)	January 3, 1949	Illinois 3rd in population (1940)
49	Hubert Humphrey (D-MN)	January 3, 1949	Minnesota 18th in population (1940)
50	Joseph Frear, Jr. (D-DE)	January 3, 1949	Delaware 47th in population (1940)
51	Henry Dworshak (R-ID)	October 14, 1949	
52	Frank Carlson (R-KS)	November 27, 1950	
53	John O. Pastore (D-RI)	December 19, 1950	
54	Everett Dirksen (R-IL)	January 3, 1951	Former representative (16 years)
55	Francis H. Case (R-SD)	January 3, 1951	Former representative (14 years)
56	Almer Monroney (D-OK)	January 3, 1951	Former representative (12 years)
57	Thomas C. Hennings, Jr. (D-MO)	January 3, 1951	Former representative (6 years)
58	George Smathers (D-FL)	January 3, 1951	Former representative (4 years)
59	John M. Butler (R-MD)	January 3, 1951	Maryland 28th in population (1940)
60	Wallace F. Bennett (R-UT)	January 3, 1951	Utah 40th in population (1940)
61	Charles E. Potter (R-MI)	November 5, 1952	Former representative
62	Prescott Bush (R-CT)	November 5, 1952	
63	Thomas Kuchel (R-CA)	January 2, 1953	
64	William A. Purtell (R-CT)	January 3, 1953	Previously a senator
65	Albert Gore, Sr. (D-TN)	January 3, 1953	Former representative (14 years)
66	Henry M. Jackson (D-WA)	January 3, 1953	Former representative (12 years)
67	James Glenn Beall (R-MD)	January 3, 1953	Former representative (10 years), Maryland 24th in population (1950)
68	Mike Mansfield (D-MT)	January 3, 1953	Former representative (10 years), Montana 42nd in population (1950)
69	John F. Kennedy (D-MA)	January 3, 1953	Former representative (6 years)
70	Frederick G. Payne (R-ME)	January 3, 1953	Former governor, Maine 35th in population (1950)
71	Frank A. Barrett (R-WY)	January 3, 1953	Former governor, Wyoming 48th in population (1950)
72	Price Daniel (D-TX)	January 3, 1953	Texas 6th in population (1950)
73	Stuart Symington (D-MO)	January 3, 1953	Missouri 12th in population (1950)
74	Barry Goldwater (R-AZ)	January 3, 1953	Arizona 37th in population (1950)
75	Sam Ervin (D-NC)	June 5, 1954	
76	Norris Cotton (R-NH)	November 8, 1954	Former representative (7 years, 10 months)
77	Roman Hruska (R-NE)	November 8, 1954	Former representative (1 year, 10 months)
78	Joseph C. O'Mahoney (D-WY)	November 29, 1954	Previously a senator
79	W. Kerr Scott (D-NC)	November 29, 1954	
80	Alan Bible (D-NV)	December 2, 1954	
81	Carl Curtis (R-NE)	January 1, 1955	
82	Clifford P. Case (R-NJ)	January 3, 1955	Former representative (8 years)
83	Thomas Martin (R-IA)	January 3, 1955	Former representative (6 years)
84	Patrick V. McNamara (D-MI)	January 3, 1955	Maryland 24th in population (1950)
85	Richard L. Neuberger (D-OR)	January 3, 1955	Oregon 31st in population (1950)
86	Gordon L. Allott (R-CO)	January 3, 1955	Colorado 32nd in population (1950)
87	W. Chapman Revercomb (R-WV)	November 7, 1956	Previously a senator (6 years)
88	John Sherman Cooper (R-KY)	November 7, 1956	Previously a senator (twice) (total tenure 4 years, 4 months)
89	Strom Thurmond (D-SC)	November 7, 1956	Previously a senator (1 year, 3 months)
91	Thruston Ballard Morton (R-KY)	January 3, 1957	Former representative (6 years)
90	John A. Carroll (D-CO)	January 3, 1957	Former representative (4 years)
92	Frank J. Lausche (D-OH)	January 3, 1957	Former governor, Ohio 5th in population (1950)
93	Herman Talmadge (D-GA)	January 3, 1957	Former governor, Georgia 13th in population (1950)
94	Joseph S. Clark (D-PA)	January 3, 1957	Pennsylvania 3rd in population (1950)
95	Frank Church (D-ID)	January 3, 1957	Idaho 43rd in population (1950)
96	Jacob K. Javits (R-NY)	January 9, 1957	
	William A. Blakley (D-TX)	January 15, 1957	
	Ralph Yarborough (D-TX)	April 29, 1957	
	William Proxmire (D-WI)	August 28, 1957	
	John D. Hoblitzell, Jr. (R-WV)	January 25, 1958	
	Ben Jordan (D-NC)	April 19, 1958	
	Jennings Randolph (D-WV)	November 5, 1958	

The most senior senators by class were Harry F. Byrd Sr. (D-Virginia) from Class 1, Richard Russell Jr. (D-Georgia) from Class 2, and Carl Hayden (D-Arizona) from Class 3.

== See also ==
- 85th United States Congress
- List of United States representatives in the 85th Congress
