= Roy R. Barrera Sr. =

American politician (1927–2026)

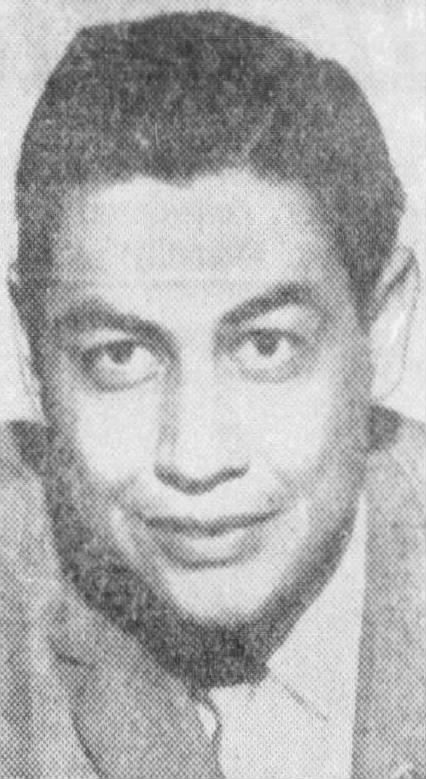
- Barrera in 1968

Secretary of State of Texas
- In office March 7, 1968 – January 23, 1969
- Governor: John Connally
- Preceded by: John Hill
- Succeeded by: Martin Dies Jr.

Personal details
- Born: Roy Ramiro Barrera; January 30, 1927 San Antonio, Texas, U.S.
- Died: March 14, 2026 (aged 99) San Antonio, Texas, U.S.
- Party: Democratic
- Education: St. Mary's University of San Antonio

Roy Ramiro Barrera Sr. (January 30, 1927 – March 14, 2026) was an American politician. He served as secretary of state of Texas from 1968 to 1969. He was Texas's first Hispanic secretary of state.

== Life and career ==
Barrera was born in San Antonio, Texas, on January 30, 1927. He attended St. Mary's University of San Antonio. After graduation, Barrera signed up for the US Army during WW2 and was assigned to the 6th Infantry division, being shipped to the Philippines where he shortly served before the atomic bombings of Hiroshima and Nagasaki, then his unit was transferred to Korea to hunt for Japanese resistance and inform Japanese civilians in Korea that the war was over and to repatriate them back to Japan. He lost a finger during his time in Korea.

Under Governor John Connally, he served as secretary of state of Texas from 1968 to 1969.

Barrera died in San Antonio, Texas on March 14, 2026, at the age of 99.
