= John C. Box =

American politician (1871–1941)

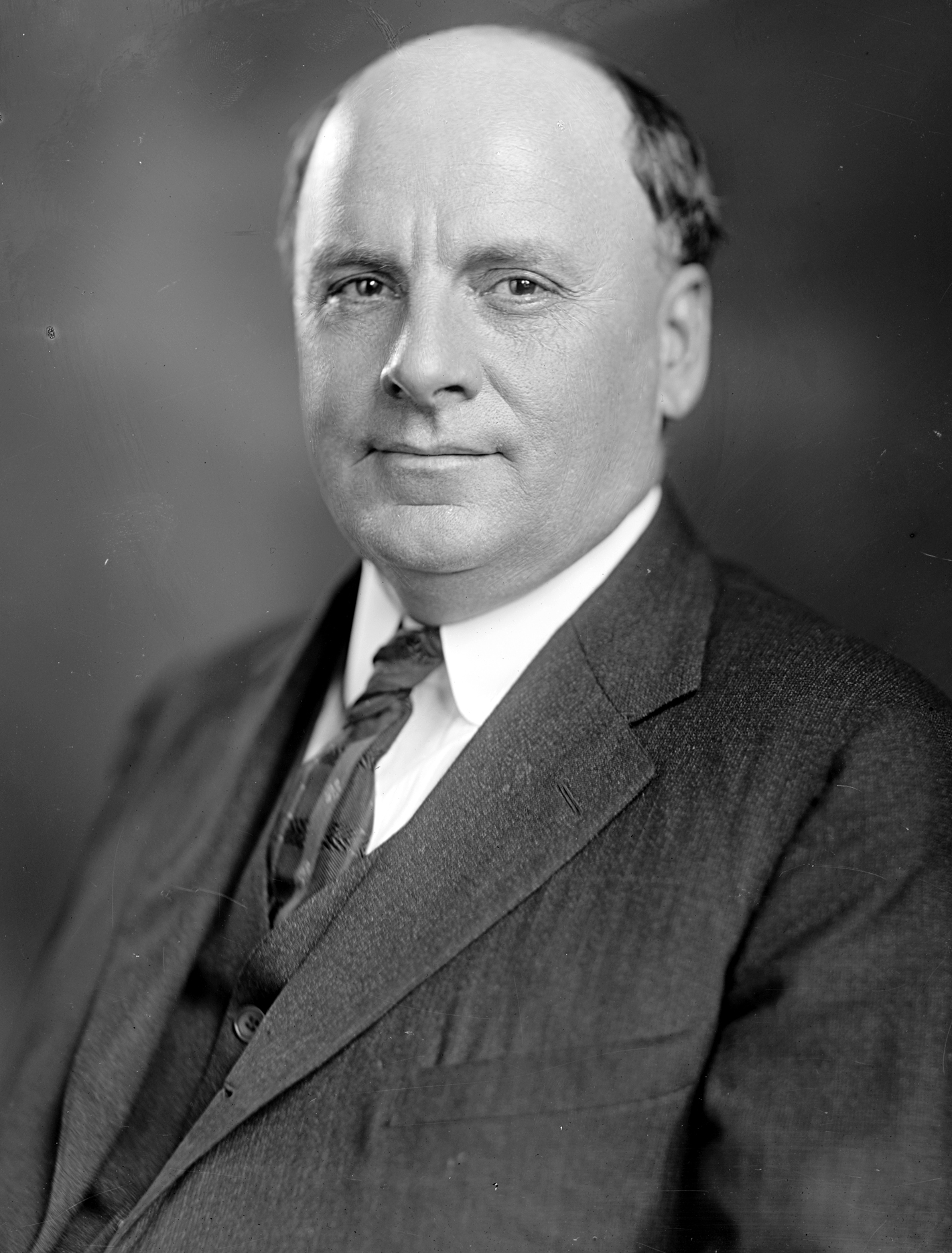

Member of the U.S. House of Representatives from Texas's 2nd district
- In office March 4, 1919 – March 3, 1931
- Preceded by: Martin Dies Sr.
- Succeeded by: Martin Dies Jr.

Mayor of Jacksonville, Texas
- In office 1902–1905

Justice of the Cherokee County Court
- In office 1898–1901

Personal details
- Born: John Calvin Box; March 28, 1871 Houston County, Texas, U.S.
- Died: May 17, 1941 (aged 70) Jacksonville, Texas, U.S.
- Resting place: City Cemetery, Jacksonville, Texas, U.S.
- Children: 1
- Parent(s): John Jasper Wesley Box; Susan Adeline Morris Box
- Education: Alexander Collegiate Institute
- Profession: Politician, lawyer

John Calvin Box (March 28, 1871 – May 17, 1941) was a U.S. Representative from Texas. Box was born on the family farm at Hammond's Creek east of the present day Latexo community in northern Houston County, Texas to John Jasper Wesley Box and Susan Adeline Morris Box. He attended the country schools, and United Methodist Church-affiliated Alexander Collegiate Institute (later Lon Morris College) in Jacksonville, Texas. He studied law and was admitted to the bar in 1893 beginning his practice in Lufkin, Texas Angelina County, Texas. His father, J.J.W. Box was a confederate army veteran and farmer. His mother a home maker and devoted wife and mother. His son, John C. Box, Jr. followed his father in the practice of law continuing the firm's work in Jacksonville, Texas.

He moved to Jacksonville, Texas, in 1897 and continued the practice of his profession. He was also a licensed Methodist lay minister. He served as judge of the Cherokee County Court 1898-1901. He served as mayor of Jacksonville 1902-1905. He served as member of the Democratic State committee 1908-1910. In 1913 John Calvin Box was one of the original founders of Southern Methodist University located in Dallas, Texas serving as a member of the board of education and as chairman 1913-1918.

Box was elected as a Democrat to the Sixty-sixth and to the five succeeding Congresses (March 4, 1919 – March 3, 1931). While serving in congress, he voiced strong opposition to uncontrolled border crossing by foreign nationals warning of future problems from these incursions. He was an unsuccessful candidate for renomination in 1930. He resumed the practice of law in Jacksonville, Texas, until his death there May 17, 1941. He was interred in the City Cemetery.

== Sources ==
- United States Congress. "John C. Box (id: B000710)". Biographical Directory of the United States Congress.

U.S. House of Representatives
Preceded by Martin Dies, Sr.	Member of the U.S. House of Representatives from Texas's 2nd congressional district 1919–1931	Succeeded by Martin Dies, Jr.
