= List of United States senators in the 72nd Congress =

This is a complete list of United States senators during the 72nd United States Congress listed by seniority from March 4, 1931, to March 3, 1933.

Order of service is based on the commencement of the senator's first term. Behind this is former service as a senator (only giving the senator seniority within their new incoming class), service as vice president, a House member, a cabinet secretary, or a governor of a state. The final factor is the population of the senator's state.

Senators who were sworn in during the middle of the Congress (up until the last senator who was not sworn in early after winning the November 1932 election) are listed at the end of the list with no number.

== Terms of service ==
Class	Terms of service of senators that expired in years
Class 3	Terms of service of senators that expired in 1933 (AL, AR, AZ, CA, CO, CT, FL, GA, ID, IL, IN, IA, KS, KY, LA, MD, MO, NC, ND, NH, NV, NY, OH, OK, OR, PA, SC, SD, UT, VT, WA, and WI.)
Class 1	Terms of service of senators that expired in 1935 (AZ, CA, CT, DE, FL, IN, MA, MD, ME, MI, MN, MO, MS, MT, ND, NE, NJ, NM, NV, NY, OH, PA, RI, TN, TX, UT, VA, VT, WA, WI, WV, and WY.)
Class 2	Terms of service of senators that expired in 1937 (AL, AR, CO, DE, GA, IA, ID, IL, KS, KY, LA, MA, ME, MI, MN, MS, MT, NC, NE, NH, NJ, NM, OK, OR, RI, SC, SD, TN, TX, VA, WV, and WY.)

== U.S. Senate seniority list ==
U.S. Senate seniority
Rank	Senator (party-state)	Seniority date	Other factors
1	Reed Smoot (R-UT)	March 4, 1903	
2	William Borah (R-ID)	March 4, 1907	
3	Wesley Jones (R-WA)	March 4, 1909	Former representative
4	Ellison D. Smith (D-SC)	March 4, 1909	South Carolina 24th in population (1900)
5	Duncan U. Fletcher (D-FL)	March 4, 1909	Florida 33rd in population (1900)
6	Claude A. Swanson (D-VA)	August 1, 1910	
7	Henry F. Ashurst (D-AZ)	April 2, 1912	
8	Key Pittman (D-NV)	January 29, 1913	
9	Morris Sheppard (D-TX)	February 3, 1913	
10	Joseph Robinson (D-AR)	March 4, 1913	Former representative (10 years), former governor
11	George W. Norris (R-NE)	March 4, 1913	Former representative (10 years)
12	Thomas J. Walsh (D-MT)	March 4, 1913	
13	James Watson (R-IN)	November 8, 1916	
14	Kenneth McKellar (D-TN)	March 4, 1917	Former representative (6 years)
15	William H. King (D-UT)	March 4, 1917	Former representative (3 years)
16	Park Trammell (D-FL)	March 4, 1917	Former governor, Florida 33rd in population (1910)
17	John B. Kendrick (D-WY)	March 4, 1917	Former governor, Wyoming 47th in population (1910)
18	Frederick Hale (R-ME)	March 4, 1917	
19	Hiram Johnson (R-CA)	March 16, 1917	
20	George H. Moses (R-NH)	November 6, 1918	
21	Charles L. McNary (R-OR)	December 18, 1918	
22	Arthur Capper (R-KS)	March 4, 1919	Former governor, Kansas 22nd in population (1910)
23	Henry W. Keyes (R-NH)	March 4, 1919	Former governor, New Hampshire 39th in population (1910)
24	William J. Harris (D-GA)	March 4, 1919	
25	Pat Harrison (D-MS)	March 5, 1919	
26	Carter Glass (D-VA)	February 2, 1920	
27	Thaddeus H. Caraway (D-AR)	March 4, 1921	Former representative
28	Peter Norbeck (R-SD)	March 4, 1921	Former governor
29	Samuel M. Shortridge (R-CA)	March 4, 1921	California 8th in population (1920)
30	Edwin S. Broussard (D-LA)	March 4, 1921	Louisiana 22nd in population (1920)
31	Tasker Oddie (R-NV)	March 4, 1921	Nevada 48th in population (1920)
32	David A. Reed (R-PA)	August 8, 1922	
33	Walter F. George (D-GA)	November 22, 1922	
34	James Couzens (R-MI)	November 29, 1922	
35	Simeon Fess (R-OH)	March 4, 1923	Former representative (10 years), Ohio 4th in population (1920)
36	Hubert D. Stephens (D-MS)	March 4, 1923	Former representative (10 years), Mississippi 23rd in population (1920)
37	Clarence Dill (D-WA)	March 4, 1923	Former representative (4 years)
38	Lynn Frazier (R-ND)	March 4, 1923	Former governor
39	Royal S. Copeland (D-NY)	March 4, 1923	New York 1st in population (1920)
40	Henrik Shipstead (FL-MN)	March 4, 1923	Minnesota 17th in population (1920)
41	Robert B. Howell (R-NE)	March 4, 1923	Nebraska 31st in population (1920)
42	Burton K. Wheeler (D-MT)	March 4, 1923	Montana 39th in population (1920)
43	Porter H. Dale (R-VT)	November 7, 1923	
44	Jesse H. Metcalf (R-RI)	November 4, 1924	
45	Hiram Bingham (R-CT)	December 17, 1924	
46	Thomas D. Schall (R-MN)	March 4, 1925	Former representative
47	Sam G. Bratton (D-NM)	March 4, 1925	
48	Robert M. La Follette, Jr. (R-WI)	September 30, 1925	
49	Arthur Robinson (R-IN)	October 20, 1925	
50	Gerald Nye (R-ND)	November 14, 1925	
51	David I. Walsh (D-MA)	December 6, 1926	Previously a senator
52	Harry B. Hawes (D-MO)	December 6, 1926	
53	Smith W. Brookhart (R-IA)	March 4, 1927	Previously a senator
54	Carl Hayden (D-AZ)	March 4, 1927	Former representative (15 years)
55	Alben W. Barkley (D-KY)	March 4, 1927	Former representative (14 years)
56	Elmer Thomas (D-OK)	March 4, 1927	Former representative (4 years), Oklahoma 21st in population (1920)
57	Millard Tydings (D-MD)	March 4, 1927	Former representative (4 years), Maryland 28th in population (1920)
58	John J. Blaine (R-WI)	March 4, 1927	Former governor
59	Robert F. Wagner (D-NY)	March 4, 1927	New York 1st in population (1920)
60	Hugo Black (D-AL)	March 4, 1927	Alabama 18th in population (1920)
61	Charles Waterman (R-CO)	March 4, 1927	Colorado 33rd in population (1920)
62	Frederick Steiwer (R-OR)	March 4, 1927	Oregon 34th in population (1920)
63	Arthur H. Vandenberg (R-MI)	March 31, 1928	
64	John Thomas (R-ID)	June 30, 1928	
65	Otis F. Glenn (R-IL)	November 7, 1928	
66	Daniel Hastings (R-DE)	December 10, 1928	
67	Bronson Cutting (R-NM)	March 4, 1929	Previously a senator
68	Tom Connally (D-TX)	March 4, 1929	Former representative (12 years)
69	Roscoe C. Patterson (R-MO)	March 4, 1929	Former representative (2 years)
70	Henry D. Hatfield (R-WV)	March 4, 1929	Former governor, West Virginia 27th in population (1920)
71	Phillips Lee Goldsborough (R-MD)	March 4, 1929	Former governor, Maryland 28th in population (1920)
72	John G. Townsend, Jr. (R-DE)	March 4, 1929	Former governor, Delaware 46th in population (1920)
73	Hamilton Kean (R-NJ)	March 4, 1929	New Jersey 10th in population (1920)
74	Frederic Walcott (R-CT)	March 4, 1929	Connecticut 29th in population (1920)
75	Felix Hebert (R-RI)	March 4, 1929	Rhode Island 38th in population (1920)
76	Robert J. Bulkley (D-OH)	December 1, 1930	Former representative
77	Robert D. Carey (R-WY)	December 1, 1930	Former governor
78	George McGill (D-KS)	December 1, 1930	
79	James J. Davis (R-PA)	December 2, 1930	
80	Dwight Morrow (R-NJ)	December 3, 1930	
81	Cameron A. Morrison (D-NC)	December 13, 1930	
82	Frank C. Partridge (R-VT)	December 23, 1930	
83	Thomas Gore (D-OK)	March 4, 1931	Previously a senator (14 years)
84	Matthew M. Neely (D-WV)	March 4, 1931	Previously a senator (6 years), former representative (8 years)
85	J. Hamilton Lewis (D-IL)	March 4, 1931	Previously a senator (6 years), former representative (2 years)
86	Cordell Hull (D-TN)	March 4, 1931	Former representative (22 years)
87	James F. Byrnes (D-SC)	March 4, 1931	Former representative (14 years), South Carolina 26th in population (1930)
88	Wallace H. White, Jr. (R-ME)	March 4, 1931	Former representative (14 years), Maine 35th in population (1930)
89	L. J. Dickinson (R-IA)	March 4, 1931	Former representative (12 years)
90	William J. Bulow (D-SD)	March 4, 1931	Former governor
91	Marcus A. Coolidge (D-MA)	March 4, 1931	Massachusetts 8th in population (1930)
92	Josiah W. Bailey (D-NC)	March 4, 1931	North Carolina 12th in population (1930)
93	John H. Bankhead II (D-AL)	March 4, 1931	Alabama 15th in population (1930)
94	Marvel M. Logan (D-KY)	March 4, 1931	Kentucky 17th in population (1930)
95	Edward Costigan (D-CO)	March 4, 1931	Colorado 33rd in population (1930)
	Warren Austin (R-VT)	April 1, 1931	
	Hattie Caraway (D-AR)	November 13, 1931	
	William Warren Barbour (D-NJ)	December 1, 1931	
96	Huey Long (D-LA)	January 25, 1932	
	John S. Cohen (D-GA)	April 25, 1932	
	Walter Walker (D-CO)	September 26, 1932	
	Elijah Grammer (R-WA)	November 22, 1932	
	Robert R. Reynolds (D-NC)	December 5, 1932	
	Karl Schuyler (R-CO)	December 7, 1932	
	Richard Russell, Jr. (D-GA)	January 12, 1933	
	Bennett Champ Clark (D-MO)	February 4, 1933	

== See also ==
- 72nd United States Congress
- List of United States representatives in the 72nd Congress
