= Martin Dies Jr. (politician, born 1921) =

American politician (1921–2001)

Secretary of State of Texas
- In office January 23, 1969 – September 1, 1971
- Governor: Preston Smith
- Preceded by: Roy R. Barrera Sr.
- Succeeded by: Bob Bullock

Member of the Texas Senate from the 3rd district
- In office January 13, 1959 – January 10, 1967
- Preceded by: Ottis Elmer Lock
- Succeeded by: Charlie Wilson

Chief Justice of the Ninth Court of Appeals of Texas
- In office September 1971 – August 31, 1989

Personal details
- Born: December 21, 1921
- Died: May 14, 2001 (aged 79)
- Party: Democratic
- Parent: Martin Dies Jr. (father)

Martin Dies Jr. (December 21, 1921 – May 14, 2001) was an American politician and jurist from Texas.

== Early life ==
Dies was the son of Myrtle McAdams and Martin Dies Jr., and the grandson of Martin Dies Sr. He was technically Martin Dies III. He grew up in Orange, Texas, and Washington, D.C., where his father was a congressman. He served in the U.S. Navy during World War II, and then earned a law degree from Southern Methodist University in 1947. He then practiced law with his father.

== Political and judicial career ==
Dies was elected to the Texas Senate in 1958, and served from 1959 through 1967. He was appointed Secretary of State of Texas in 1969, and served until 1971. After his term expired, he was appointed to Texas's Ninth Court of Appeals of Texas, and he served as its chief justice until 1989.

== Legacy ==
Dam B State Park was renamed Martin Dies Jr. State Park in his honor in 1965.

Dies died on May 14, 2001.
