= Martin Dies Sr. =

American politician (1870–1922)

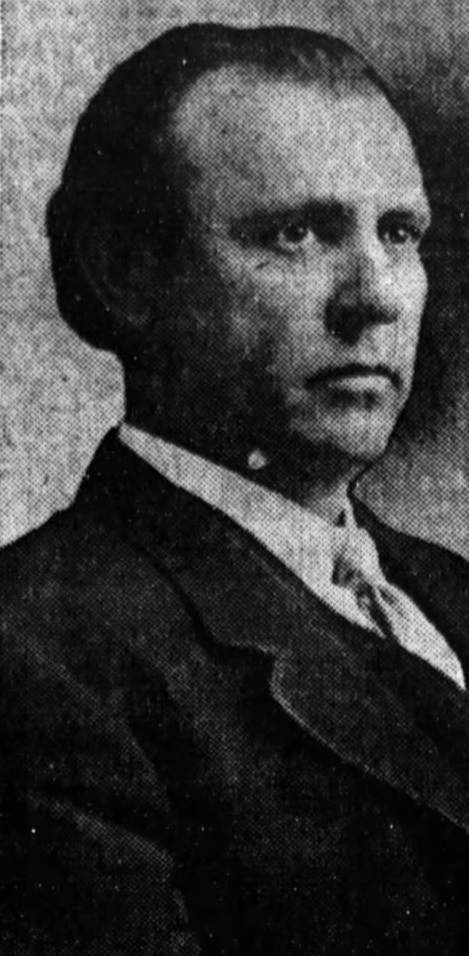
- Dies in 1912

Member of the U.S. House of Representatives from Texas's 2nd district
- In office March 4, 1909 – March 3, 1919
- Preceded by: Samuel Bronson Cooper
- Succeeded by: John C. Box

Personal details
- Born: Martin Dies; March 13, 1870 Jackson Parish, Louisiana
- Died: July 13, 1922 (aged 52) Kerrville, Texas
- Resting place: Glenwood Cemetery, Houston, Texas
- Party: Democratic
- Spouse(s): Mary Olive Cline (m. 1888-1910, div.); Florence Nelva Miller (m. 1910-1922, his death)
- Children: 4 (including Martin Dies Jr.)
- Parent(s): David Wesley Dies and Sarah Jane Pyburn
- Education: University of Texas School of Law
- Profession: Attorney

Martin Dies (March 13, 1870 – July 13, 1922) was a Texas politician and a Democratic member of the United States House of Representatives. His son Martin Dies Jr. was also a member of the United States House of Representatives. His grandson, also known as Martin Dies Jr., was a Texas state senator, secretary of state, and jurist.

Dies was born in Jackson Parish, Louisiana, and moved with his parents to Freestone County, Texas, in 1876. He graduated from the law department of the University of Texas at Austin and was admitted to the bar in 1893, practicing in Woodville, Texas.

He edited a newspaper in Freestone County, was county marshal and later county judge of Tyler County, Texas in 1894. During the Spanish-American War, Dies was a member of the Beaumont Light Guards, a National Guard unit which was called to federal service as Company D, 3rd Texas Volunteer Infantry Regiment.

Dies served as district attorney of the first judicial district of Texas from 1898 to 1900. He moved to Beaumont, Texas in 1902 and was employed as counsel for the Gulf Refining Co.

In 1908, Dies was a successful Democratic candidate for the U.S. House. He was reelected four times and served March 4, 1909 to March 3, 1919 (The 61st to 65th Congresses). He served as chairman of the Committee on Railways and Canals in the 63rd and 64th Congresses.

After leaving Congress, Dies retired to his ranch on Turkey Creek in Tyler County, Texas. He moved to Kerrville, Texas in 1921. Dies died in Kerrville on July 13, 1922, at the age of 52 in a hospital a few days after an emergency operation for acute appendicitis. He was interred at Glenwood Cemetery in Houston.

== Sources ==
- DIES, Martin in the Biographical Directory of the United States Congress

U.S. House of Representatives
Preceded by Samuel Bronson Cooper	Member of the U.S. House of Representatives from Texas's 2nd congressional district 1909–1919	Succeeded by John C. Box
