= Martin Dies Jr. =

American politician (1900–1972)

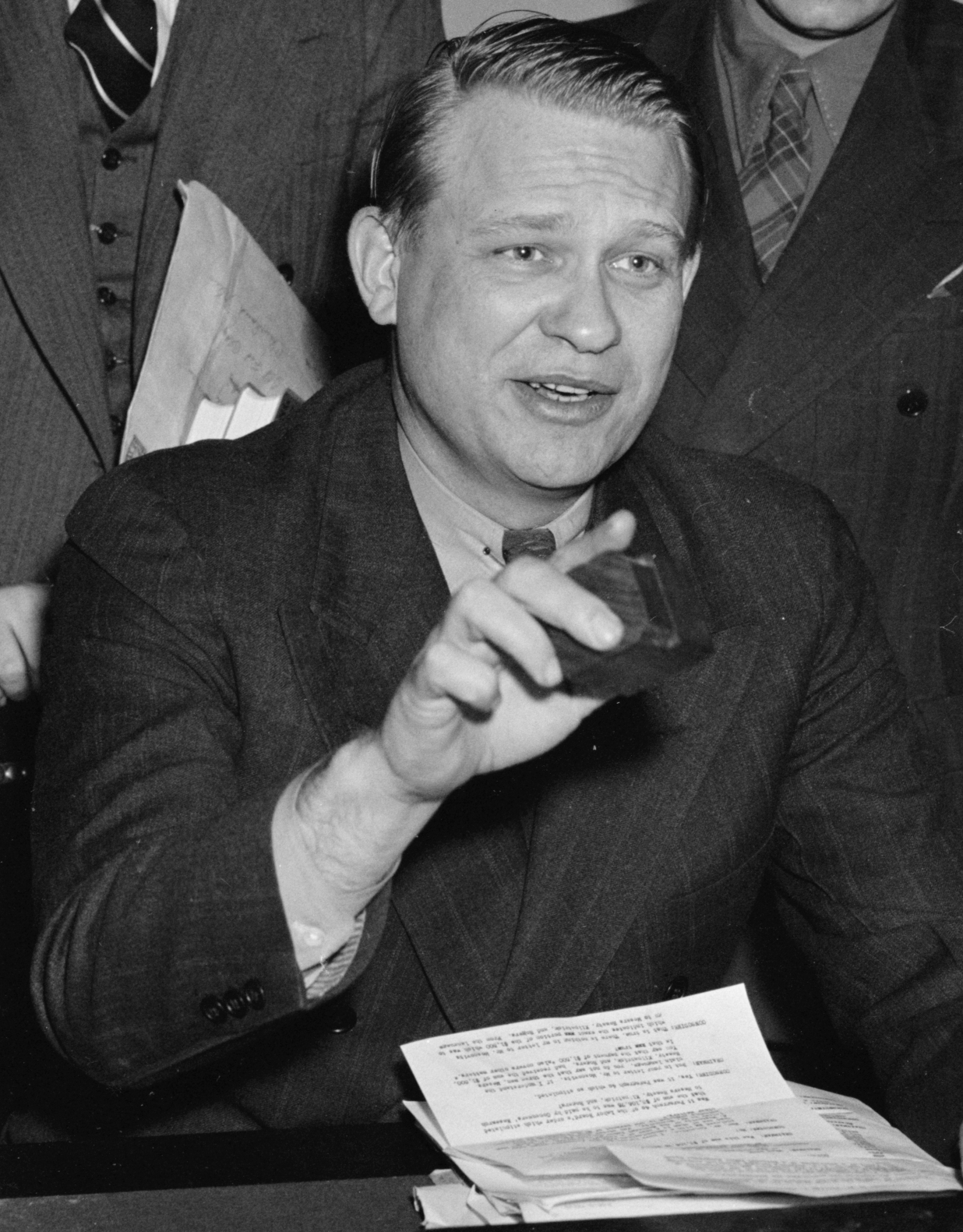
- Dies chairing a 1938 meeting of the House Un-American Activities Committee

Member of the U.S. House of Representatives from Texas
- In office March 4, 1931 – January 3, 1945
- Preceded by: John Calvin Box
- Succeeded by: Jesse Martin Combs
- Constituency: 2nd district
- In office January 3, 1953 – January 3, 1959
- Preceded by: district created
- Succeeded by: district abolished
- Constituency: At-large district

Chairman of the House Committee Investigating Un-American Activities
- In office 1938–1944
- Preceded by: office established
- Succeeded by: Edward J. Hart

Personal details
- Born: November 5, 1900 Colorado City, Texas, U.S.
- Died: November 14, 1972 (aged 72) Lufkin, Texas, U.S.
- Party: Democratic
- Spouse: Myrtle McAdams (m. 1920)
- Children: 3, including Martin Dies Jr.
- Parents: Martin Dies Sr. (father); Olive Cline Blackshear (mother)
- Education: University of Texas; National University School of Law (LLB)
- Occupation: Lawyer; politician

Martin Dies Jr. (November 5, 1900 – November 14, 1972), also known as Martin Dies Sr., was a Texas politician and a Democratic member of the United States House of Representatives. He was elected as a Democrat to the Seventy-second and after that to the six succeeding Congresses (March 4, 1931 – January 3, 1945). In 1944, Dies did not seek renomination to the Seventy-ninth Congress, but was elected to the Eighty-third and to the two succeeding Congresses (January 3, 1953 – January 3, 1959). Again, he did not seek renomination in 1958 to the Eighty-sixth Congress. In 1941 and 1957, he was twice defeated for the nomination to fill a vacancy in the United States Senate. A Southern Conservative Democrat, Dies served as the first chairman of the Special Committee to Investigate Un-American Activities from 1937 through 1944 (Seventy-fifth through Seventy-eighth Congresses).

== Background ==
He was born in Colorado City, Texas, on November 5, 1900, to Martin Dies Sr., who was a member of the United States House of Representatives from 1909 to 1919. He studied at the University of Texas and obtained a Bachelor of Laws degree at the National University School of Law, Washington, DC.

== Career ==
Dies worked as an attorney in Marshall, Texas and Orange, Texas and eventually became a district judge. In 1931, Dies was elected from Texas 2nd District to the House of Representatives, a constituency that his father represented for a decade, thus becoming a second generation Democratic U.S. congressman.

After the Wall Street Crash of 1929, Dies wrote in the Chicago Herald-Examiner that the "large alien population is the basic cause of unemployment."

Due to the support of fellow Texan John Nance Garner, he became a member of the important House Rules Committee. At the beginning, Dies fully supported the New Deal as it aimed to provide relief for the distressed rural areas, which he represented in Congress. However, being a conservative Southerner, he turned against it after the 1936 election, when labor unions started to play a much bigger role in national politics.

In 1938, he started as a chairman of the Special Committee to Investigate Un-American Activities and remained at its helm until 1944. At ease with newsmen, Dies was frequently in the national media spotlight.

=== House Committee Investigating Un-American Activities ===
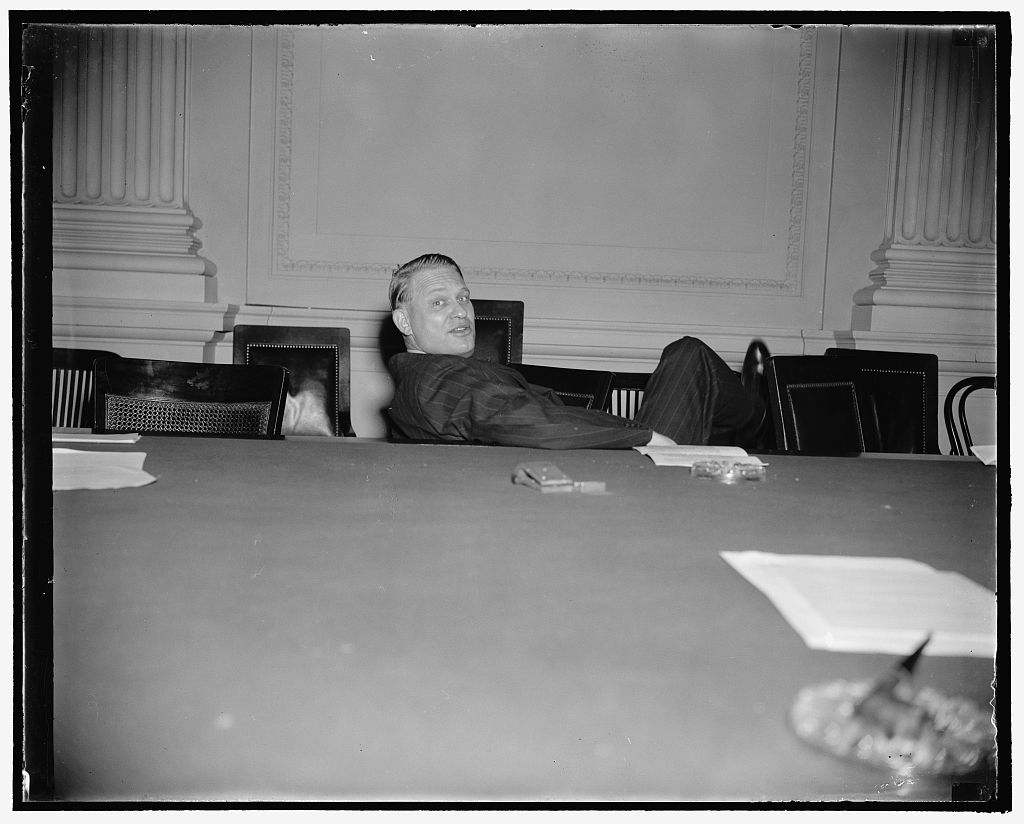
Dies relaxes as he speaks to reporters (November 7, 1938)

Dies and Samuel Dickstein created the House Committee Investigating Un-American Activities, initially nicknamed the Dies Committee, later becoming HUAC in 1946. Dies was its first chairman, serving for seven years from 1938 to 1944, and declaring a crusade against right-wing and left-wing subversives in the government, and other organizations nationwide. Dies' committee mainly targeted communist infiltrators and sympathizers. Samuel Dickstein was named in the 1990s as a Soviet agent in the Venona project materials.

==== Dies Committee, Nazism, and the KKK ====
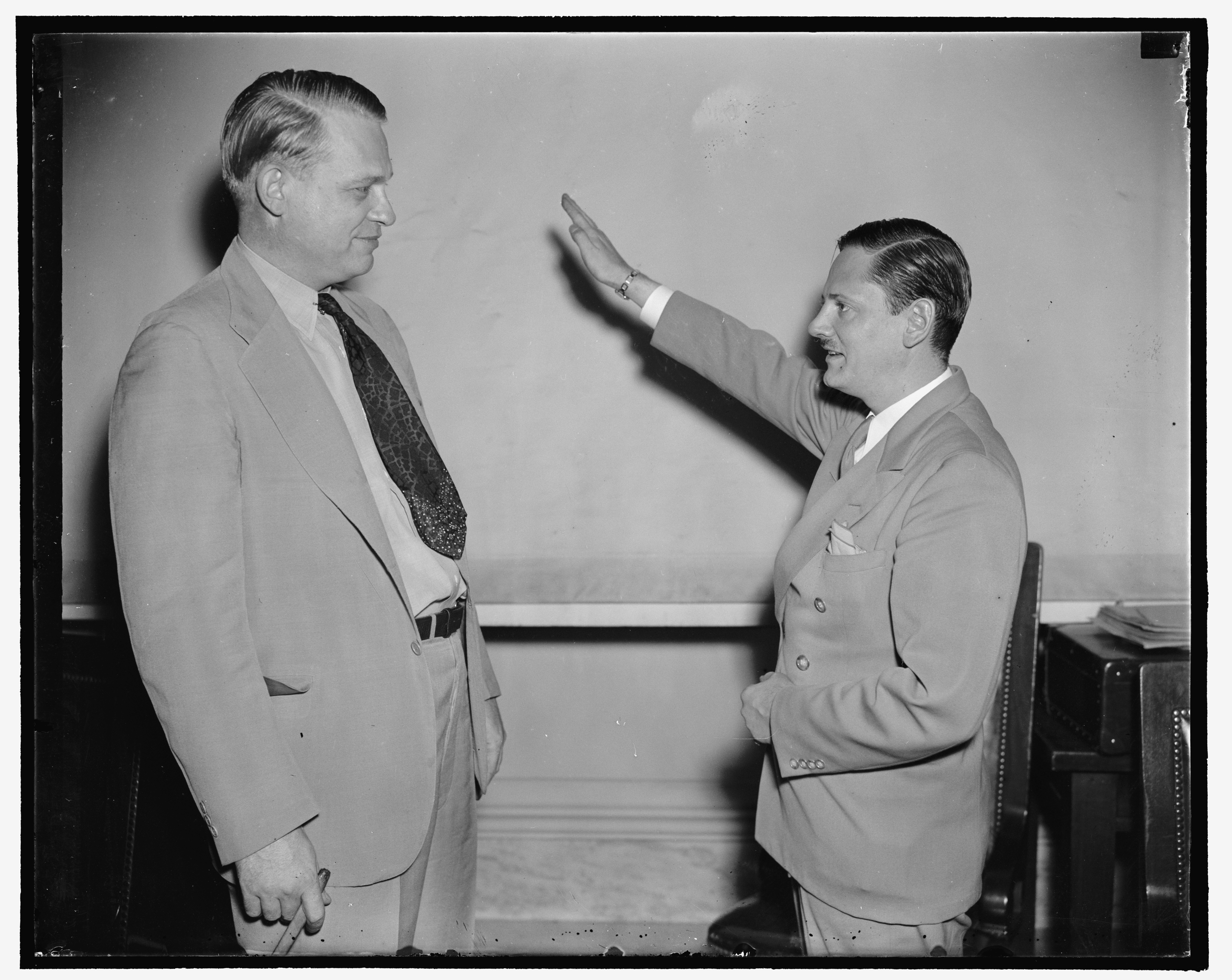
Dies receives "Heil Hitler" from first witness John Metcalfe, former Chicago reporter, then committee investigator who infiltrated Nazis under name Hellmut Oberwinder (August 12, 1938)

In pre-war years and during World War II, HUAC was known as the Dies Committee. Its work was aimed at investigating fascist and communist subversive activities. Dies targeted German American involvement in Nazi activity, such as the German American Bund. As to investigations into the activities of the Ku Klux Klan, some members of the Committee showed reluctance to investigate. When HUAC's chief counsel Ernest Adamson announced that: "The committee has decided that it lacks sufficient data on which to base a probe," committee member John E. Rankin added: "After all, the KKK is an old American institution." However, Dies himself personally berated Imperial Wizard James A. Colescott for the Klan's anti-Catholicism.

As chairman, Dies pursued Nazis, labor unions, New Deal agencies, and communist or communist-affiliated groups, from which he gained a national reputation and even published a book about his exploits, The Trojan Horse of America (1940).

==== Shirley Temple and Hollywood ====
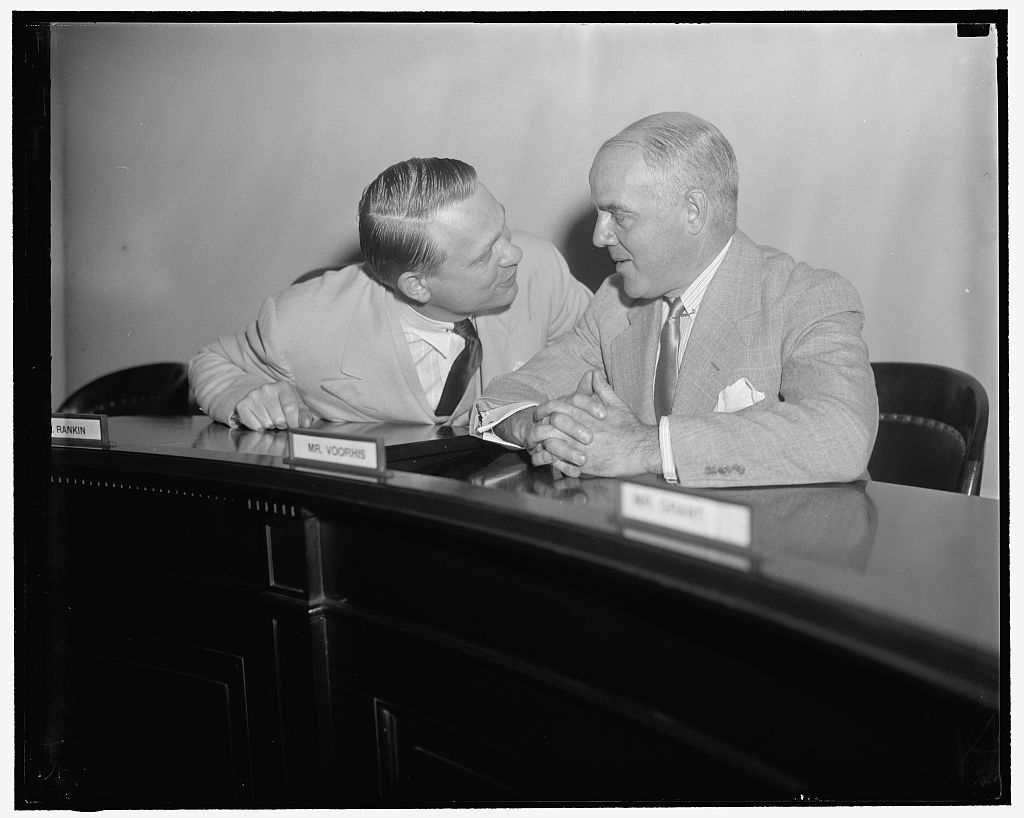
Dies speaks with fellow committee member J. Parnell Thomas, who had recently sponsored a bill of impeachment against Secretary of Labor Frances Perkins, to discuss forthcoming testimony of Felix McWhirter (May 23, 1939)

While there had been earlier Congressional hearings on communist and Nazi activity, such as by Hamilton Fish in 1932 and McCormack and Dickstein in 1934, the Dies Committee hearings captured greater public attention and scrutiny. In 1938, the committee was criticized for including Shirley Temple, who was 10 years old at the time, on a list of Hollywood figures who sent greetings to the leftist Communist-owned French newspaper, Ce Soir. The Roosevelt Administration mentioned the attacks when Harold Ickes, Secretary of the Interior, stated: "They have found dangerous radicals there led by little Shirley Temple." Secretary of Labor Frances Perkins added that Shirley Temple was born an American citizen and should not have to debate such "preposterous revelations". The Committee responded to these attacks via an NBC broadcast, in which the testimony of Dr. J. B. Matthews, which launched the Shirley Temple outcry was read verbatim. In this testimony, Dr. Matthews stated:

The Communist Party relies heavily on the carelessness or indifference of thousands of prominent citizens in lending their names for its propaganda purposes. For example, the French newspaper Ce Soir, which is owned outright by the Communist Party, featured hearty greetings from Clark Gable, Robert Taylor, James Cagney, and even Shirley Temple. ... No one, I hope, is going to claim that any one of these persons in particular is a Communist.

==== Backlash ====
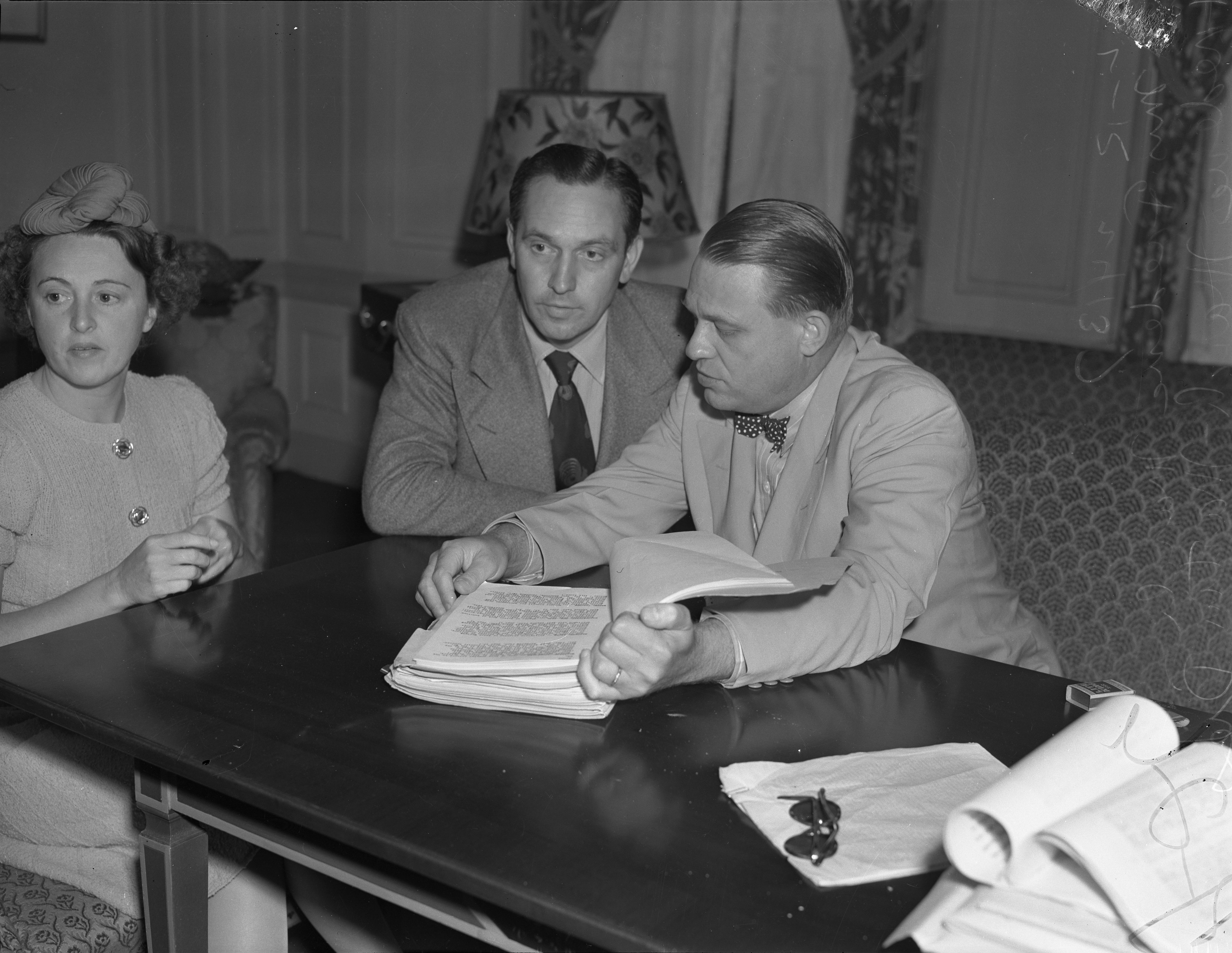
Actress Florence Eldridge, actor Fredric March, and Martin Dies Jr. at Dies Committee hearings in Los Angeles (1940)

Dies was criticized for using his Committee to further his personal campaign to undermine the New Deal agenda during the late 1930s and early 1940s. For example, Michigan Governor Frank Murphy lost his re-election bid in 1938 after being labeled "a Communist or a Communist dupe" during testimony before the committee. Roosevelt himself labeled this incident as a "flagrantly unfair and un-American attempt to influence an election." The Labor Department, the WPA Federal Theatre Project and Writers' Project, and the National Labor Relations Board were subjected to similar denunciations. While the Committee ostensibly investigated both suspected Communists and Fascists, Dies was concerned primarily with a supposed Communist conspiracy, as reflected in his own book, The Trojan Horse in America. In 1940, Congressman Frank Eugene Hook sought to discredit the committee, and Dies personally, by presenting evidence linking Dies to the agitator and spiritualist William Dudley Pelley; but Dies was able to show that the documents cited by Hook were forged.

Dies articulated concerns of the "racial question" as it related to minimum wage provision under the Fair Labor Standards Acts, stating, "What is prescribed for one race must be prescribed for the others, and you cannot prescribe the same wages for the black man as for the white man."

Encouraged by his victory over Hook and a quadrupling of his Committee's budget, Dies' accusations became progressively more scurrilous. In March 1942, he wrote a letter to Vice President Henry Wallace claiming that 35 members of the Board of Economic Warfare, which Wallace chaired, had been members of Communist organizations. He singled out one member in particular, Maurice Parmelee, as both a Communist sympathizer and a nudist, based on Parmelee's 1926 book, The New Gymnosophy. Parmelee was indeed an advocate for gymnosophy, a form of asceticism originated by two German nudist activists, but its relevance to American national security was never convincingly explained.

Dies' public charges and rumor-mongering after June 1941 came at a time when the USSR was a member of the allied nations resisting the Nazi offensive in Europe and North Africa. Rather than assisting the effort to ferret out Nazi spies during World War II, Dies continued his pre-war fixation and focused almost entirely on Communist spies in the U.S. government—a precursor to the McCarthy era during the 1950s.

=== Later life ===
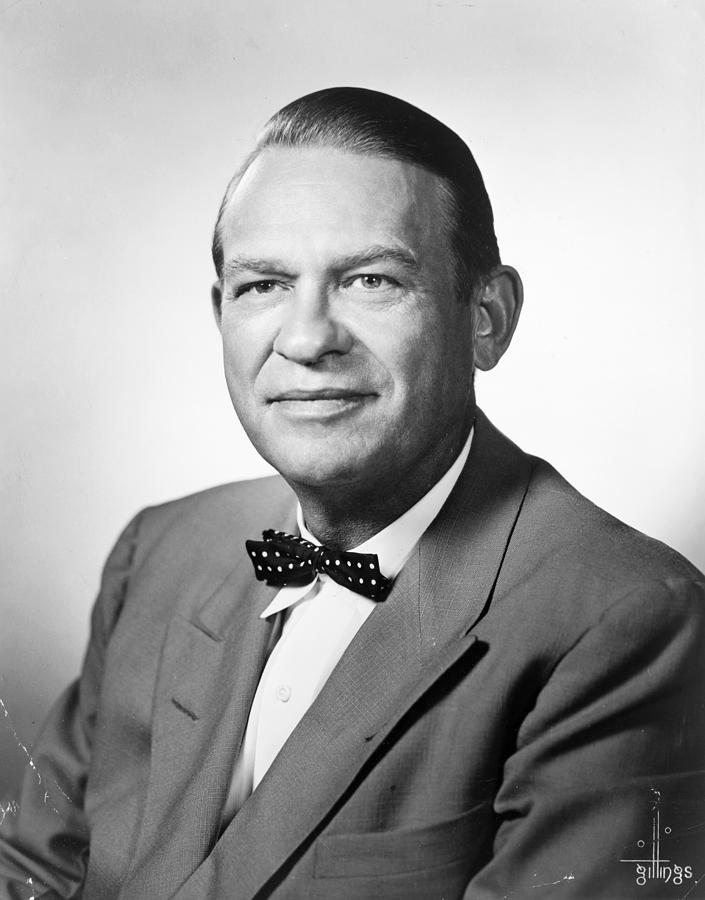
Martin Dies Jr., official portrait for the US Congress (1952)

Dies was an unsuccessful candidate for the United States Senate in a special election held in late June, 1941 to fill the seat vacated by the death of Senator Morris Sheppard. Dies finished a distant fourth, losing to the sitting Governor, Pappy O'Daniel who narrowly beat Congressman Lyndon B. Johnson in Johnson's first run for the Senate.

Dies was a critic of the Congress of Industrial Organizations, having found 280 salaried CIO organizers within its ranks funded by the Soviet-backed Communist Party of the USA. Dies did not run for re-election in 1944 after the CIO began a voter registration drive in his district and found a candidate to oppose him. Dies supported the anti-Roosevelt Texas Regulars in the 1944 presidential election.

Dies was reelected to the House in 1952 in an at-large seat when Texas received another seat through reapportionment. In 1957, he ran for the Senate again in a special election to finish the term of Price Daniel, who left the Senate to become governor of Texas. Dies finished with 30 percent of the vote, second to Ralph Yarborough, who led with 38 percent. Republican Thad Hutcheson, a Houston lawyer, finished third with 23 percent. No runoff was then required in Texas special elections, though Dies and Hutcheson collectively held 53 percent of the vote. Yarborough hence took the Senate seat, which he held until January 3, 1971. Dies was a signatory to the 1956 Southern Manifesto that opposed the desegregation of public schools ordered by the Supreme Court in Brown v. Board of Education. Dies retired again from the House in January 1959. From 1953 to 1959, "he held no important positions."

Dies returned to Texas to practice law.

== Death and legacy ==
In 1920, Dies married Myrtle McAdams and had three sons: Robert, Jack, and Martin Jr., who became a Texas state senator and Secretary of State of Texas.

Dies died November 14, 1972, of an apparent heart attack at the age of 72.

== See also ==
- List of George Washington University alumni
- List of presidents pro tempore of the Texas Senate
- List of members of the House Un-American Activities Committee
- List of United States representatives from Texas
- List of United States representatives in the 72nd Congress
- List of United States representatives in the 74th Congress
- List of United States representatives in the 75th Congress
- List of United States representatives in the 76th Congress
- List of United States representatives in the 77th Congress
- List of United States representatives in the 78th Congress
- List of United States representatives in the 83rd Congress
- List of United States representatives in the 85th Congress

U.S. House of Representatives
Preceded by John Calvin Box	Member of the U.S. House of Representatives from Texas's 2nd congressional district 1931–1945	Succeeded by Jesse Martin Combs
Preceded by District created	Member of the U.S. House of Representatives from Texas's at-large congressional seat 1953–1958	Succeeded by District abolished
