= 72nd United States Congress =

1931–1933 U.S. Congress

←	71st	73rd	→
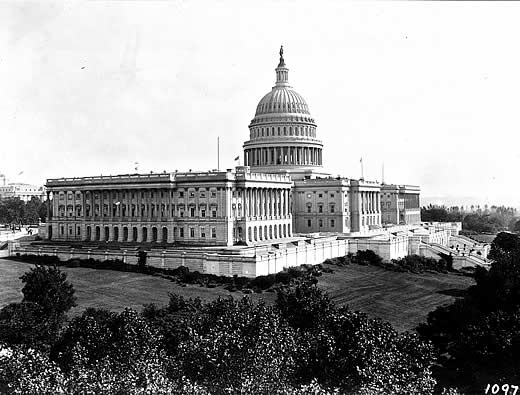
- United States Capitol (1906)

Overview
- Legislative body: United States Congress
- Jurisdiction: United States
- Term: March 4, 1931 – March 4, 1933

Senate
- Members: 96
- President: Charles Curtis (R)
- President pro tempore: George H. Moses (R)
- Party control: Republican (with tie-breaking VP)

House of Representatives
- Members: 435 representatives 5 non-voting delegates
- Speaker: John N. Garner (D)
- Party control: Republican (upon election) Democratic (upon seating)

Sessions
- 1st: December 7, 1931 – July 16, 1932
- 2nd: December 2, 1932 – March 3, 1933

The 72nd United States Congress was a meeting of the legislative branch of the United States federal government, consisting of the United States Senate and the United States House of Representatives. It met in Washington, D.C. from March 4, 1931, to March 4, 1933, during the last two years of Herbert Hoover's presidency. The apportionment of seats in this House of Representatives was based on the 1910 United States census. The Senate had a Republican majority. The House started with a very slim Republican majority, but by the time it first met in December 1931, the Democrats had gained a majority through special elections.

== Major events ==
- Ongoing: Great Depression
- January 12, 1932: Hattie Wyatt Caraway of Arkansas became the first woman elected to the United States Senate. (Rebecca Latimer Felton of Georgia had been appointed to fill a vacancy in 1922.) Caraway had won a special election to fill the remaining months of the term of her late husband, Senator Thaddeus H. Caraway. She won re-election to a full term in 1932 and again in 1938 and served in the Senate until January 1945.
- July 28, 1932: Bonus Army was dispersed.
- November 8, 1932: 1932 United States elections:
  - 1932 United States presidential election: Incumbent Republicans Herbert Hoover and Charles Curtis lost to Democrats Franklin Roosevelt as President, and John Nance Garner as Vice President.
  - 1932 United States Senate elections: Democrats gained 12 seats for a 59–36 majority.
  - 1932 United States House of Representatives elections: Democrats gained 97 seats for a 313–117 majority.

== Major legislation ==
- January 22, 1932: Reconstruction Finance Corporation Act, Sess. 1, ch. 8, 47 Stat. 5
- February 27, 1932: Glass–Steagall Act of 1932, Sess. 1, ch. 58, 47 Stat. 56
- March 23, 1932: Norris–LaGuardia Act, Sess. 1, ch. 90, 47 Stat. 70
- June 6, 1932: Revenue Act of 1932, Sess. 1, ch. 209, 47 Stat. 169
- June 22, 1932: Federal Kidnapping Act, Sess. 1, ch. 271, 47 Stat. 326
- June 30, 1932: Economy Act of 1932, Sess. 1, ch. 314, 47 Stat. 399
- July 21, 1932: Emergency Relief and Construction Act, Sess. 1, ch. 520, 47 Stat. 709
- July 22, 1932: Federal Home Loan Bank Act, Sess. 1, ch. 522, 47 Stat. 725
- January 17, 1933: Hare–Hawes–Cutting Act, Sess. 2, ch. 11, 47 Stat. 761
- March 3, 1933: Buy American Act, Sess. 2, ch. 212, title III, 47 Stat. 1520

== Constitutional amendments ==
- March 2, 1932: Approved an amendment to the United States Constitution moving the beginning and ending of the terms of the president and vice president from March 4 to January 20, and of members of Congress from March 4 to January 3, and also establishing what is to be done when there is no president-elect, and submitted it to the state legislatures for ratification
  - January 23, 1933: The Twentieth Amendment to the United States Constitution was ratified by the requisite number of states (then 36) to become part of the Constitution.
- February 20, 1933: Approved an amendment to the U.S. Constitution repealing the Eighteenth Amendment, and submitted it to state ratifying conventions for ratification
  - Amendment was later ratified on December 5, 1933, becoming the Twenty-first Amendment to the United States Constitution

== Party summary ==
The count below identifies party affiliations at the beginning of the first session of this Congress, and includes members from vacancies and newly admitted states, when they were first seated. Changes resulting from subsequent replacements are shown below in the "Changes in membership" section.

=== Senate ===
Republicans controlled the Senate through a VP-tie-breaking majority.

	Party (shading shows control)			Total	Vacant
	Democratic (D)	Farmer– Labor (FL)	Republican (R)	Total	Vacant
End of previous congress	42	1	53	96	0
Begin	47	1	48	96	0
End	46	1	48	95	1
Final voting share	48.4%	1.1%	50.5%		
Beginning of next congress	58	1	36	95	1

=== House of Representatives ===
Affiliation	Party (Shading indicates majority caucus)			Total	
Affiliation	Democratic	Farmer–Labor	Republican	Total	Vacant
End of previous Congress	166	1	265	432	3
Begin	216	1	217	434	1
March 16, 1931	215	1	217	433	2
April 9, 1931	215	1	216	432	3
May 12, 1931	216	1	216	433	2
May 26, 1931	215	1	216	432	3
May 29, 1931	214	1	216	431	4
July 4, 1931	214	1	215	430	5
July 13, 1931	213	1	215	429	6
July 18, 1931	213	1	214	428	7
July 28, 1931	212	1	214	427	8
September 9, 1931	213	1	214	428	7
September 29, 1931	214	1	214	429	6
October 13, 1931	214	1	215	430	5
October 18, 1931	214	1	214	429	6
October 22, 1931	214	1	213	428	7
November 3, 1931	217	1	215	433	2
November 6, 1931	217	1	214	432	3
November 24, 1931	218	1	214	433	2
December 1, 1931 Beginning of first session	219	1	214	434	1
January 5, 1932	220	1	214	435	0
January 29, 1932	220	1	213	434	1
February 4, 1932	218	1	213	432	3
March 2, 1932	219	1	213	433	2
March 15, 1932	220	1	213	434	1
April 1, 1932	220	1	212	433	2
April 5, 1932	221	1	211	433	2
April 21, 1932	221	1	210	432	3
April 26, 1932	221	1	211	433	2
May 31, 1932	221	1	210	432	3
June 14, 1932	220	1	210	431	4
July 23, 1932	219	1	210	430	5
August 14, 1932	220	1	210	431	4
October 5, 1932	219	1	210	430	5
October 7, 1932	218	1	210	429	6
November 6, 1932	217	1	210	428	7
November 8, 1932	220	1	212	433	2
November 29, 1932	220	1	211	432	3
December 3, 1932	220	1	210	431	4
December 13, 1932	219	1	210	430	5
January 7, 1933	219	1	209	429	6
January 8, 1933	219	1	208	428	7
January 28, 1933	220	1	208	429	6
February 16, 1933	220	1	206	427	8
Final voting share	51.4%	0.2%	48.4%		
Non-voting members	0	0	2	5	0
Beginning of next Congress	311	5	117	433	2

== Leadership ==
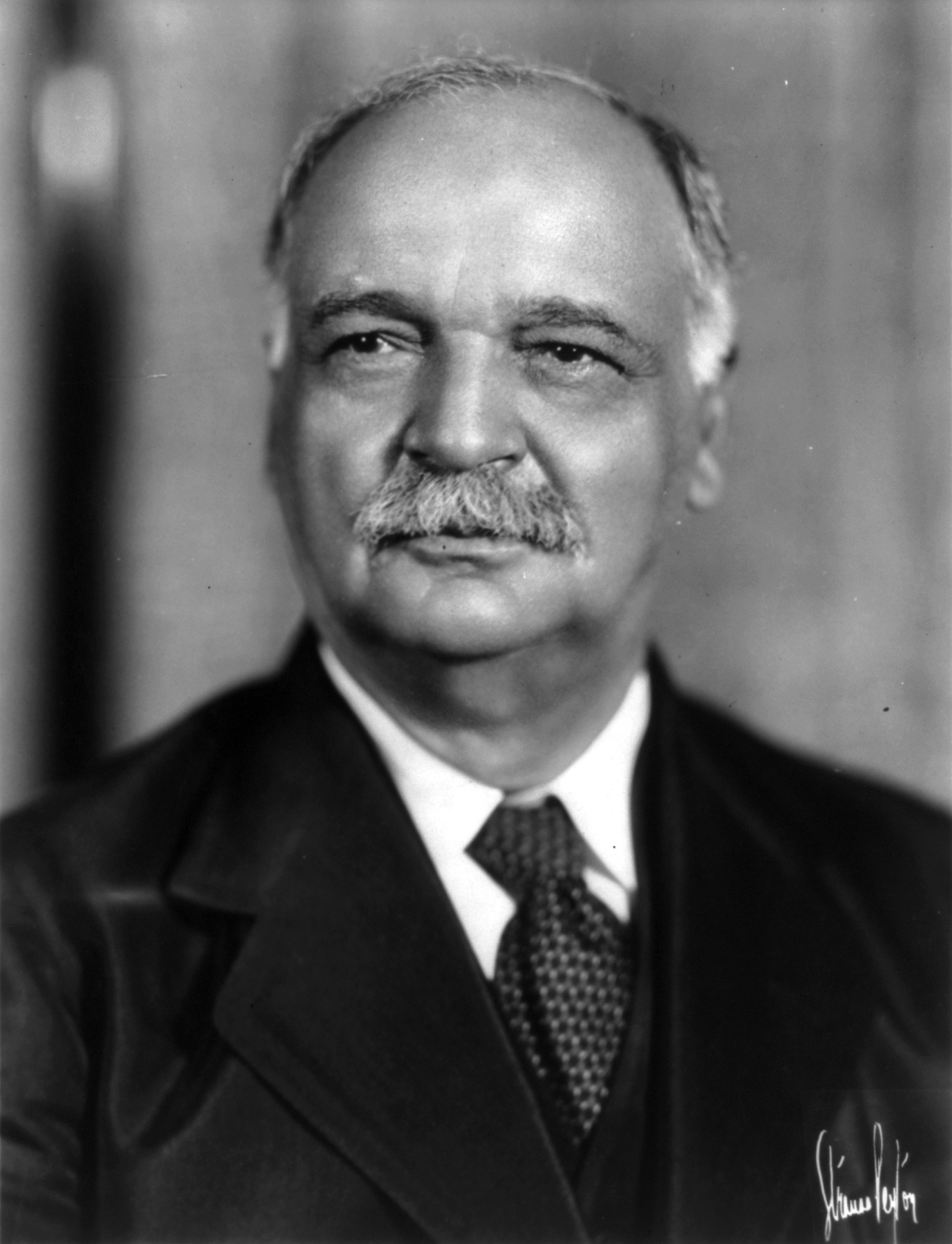
President of the Senate Charles Curtis (R)

=== Senate ===
- President: Charles Curtis (R)
- President pro tempore: George H. Moses (R)

==== Majority (Republican) ====
- Majority Leader: James E. Watson
- Majority Whip: Simeon D. Fess
- Republican Conference Secretary: Frederick Hale
- National Senatorial Committee Chair: Daniel O. Hastings

==== Minority (Democratic) ====
- Minority Leader: Joseph T. Robinson
- Minority Whip: Morris Sheppard
- Democratic Caucus Secretary: Hugo Black

=== House of Representatives ===
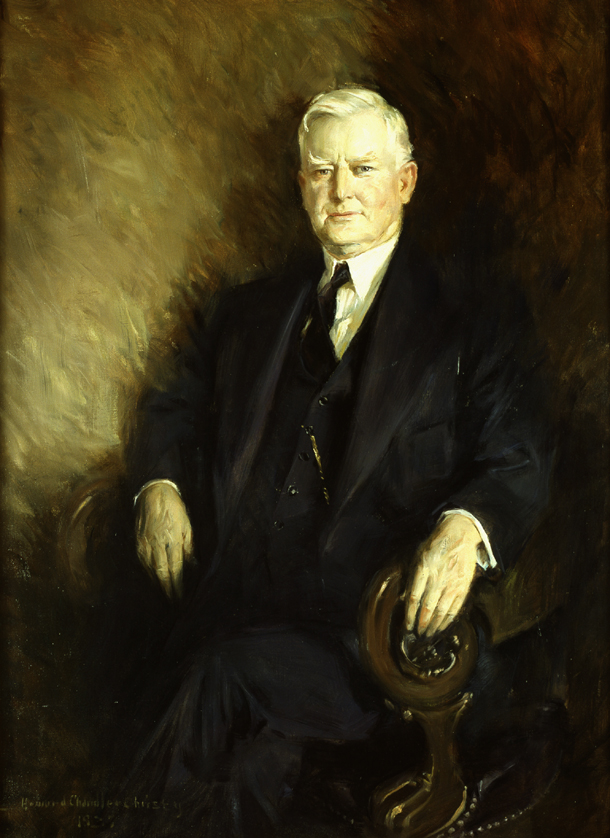
House Speaker John Garner (D)

- Speaker: John N. Garner (D)

Note: Republican Nicholas Longworth, the Speaker of the House in the previous Congress, was Speaker-presumptive with his party's mere three-seat majority. However, Longworth died on April 9, 1931, and by the time the 72nd Congress convened in December 1931, Democrats had gained four seats from Republicans through special elections following deaths, thus becoming the majority party in the House. Democrat John Garner was subsequently elected as Speaker.

==== Majority (Democratic) ====
- Majority Leader: Henry T. Rainey
- Majority Whip: John McDuffie
- Democratic Caucus Chairman: William W. Arnold
- Democratic Campaign Committee Chairman: Joseph W. Byrns Sr.

==== Minority (Republican) ====
- Minority Leader: Bertrand H. Snell
- Minority Whip: Carl G. Bachmann
- Republican Conference Chairman: Willis C. Hawley
- Republican Campaign Committee Chairman: William R. Wood

== Members ==
This list is arranged by chamber, then by state. Senators are listed by class, and representatives are listed by district.

=== Senate ===
Senators were elected every two years, with one-third beginning new six-year terms with each Congress. Preceding the names in the list below are Senate class numbers, which indicate the cycle of their election. In this Congress, Class 1 meant their term began in the last Congress, requiring reelection in 1934; Class 2 meant their term began with this Congress, requiring reelection in 1936; and Class 3 meant their term ended with this Congress, requiring reelection in 1932.

==== Alabama ====
▌2. John H. Bankhead II (D)
▌3. Hugo Black (D)

==== Arizona ====
▌1. Henry F. Ashurst (D)
▌3. Carl Hayden (D)

==== Arkansas ====
▌2. Joseph Taylor Robinson (D)
▌3. Thaddeus H. Caraway (D), until November 6, 1931

▌Hattie Caraway (D), from November 13, 1931

==== California ====
▌1. Hiram W. Johnson (R)
▌3. Samuel M. Shortridge (R)

==== Colorado ====
▌2. Edward P. Costigan (D)
▌3. Charles W. Waterman (R), until August 27, 1932

▌Walter Walker (D), September 16, 1932 – December 6, 1932
▌Karl C. Schuyler (R), from December 7, 1932

==== Connecticut ====
▌1. Frederic C. Walcott (R)
▌3. Hiram Bingham III (R)

==== Delaware ====
▌1. John G. Townsend Jr. (R)
▌2. Daniel O. Hastings (R)

==== Florida ====
▌1. Park Trammell (D)
▌3. Duncan U. Fletcher (D)

==== Georgia ====
▌2. William J. Harris (D), until April 18, 1932

▌John S. Cohen (D), April 25, 1932 – January 11, 1933
▌Richard Russell Jr. (D), from January 12, 1933

▌3. Walter F. George (D)

==== Idaho ====
▌2. William E. Borah (R)
▌3. John Thomas (R)

==== Illinois ====
▌2. James Hamilton Lewis (D)
▌3. Otis F. Glenn (R)

==== Indiana ====
▌1. Arthur R. Robinson (R)
▌3. James E. Watson (R)

==== Iowa ====
▌2. Lester J. Dickinson (R)
▌3. Smith W. Brookhart (R)

==== Kansas ====
▌2. Arthur Capper (R)
▌3. George McGill (D)

==== Kentucky ====
▌2. Marvel M. Logan (D)
▌3. Alben W. Barkley (D)

==== Louisiana ====
▌2. Huey Long (D), from January 25, 1932 (Note: Huey Long (D-Louisiana) was elected in November 1930 to a Senate term beginning March 4, 1931; however, he chose not to assume office until January 25, 1932, when his term as governor of Louisiana ended.)
▌3. Edwin S. Broussard (D)

==== Maine ====
▌1. Frederick Hale (R)
▌2. Wallace H. White Jr. (R)

==== Maryland ====
▌1. Phillips Lee Goldsborough (R)
▌3. Millard Tydings (D)

==== Massachusetts ====
▌1. David I. Walsh (D)
▌2. Marcus A. Coolidge (D)

==== Michigan ====
▌1. Arthur H. Vandenberg (R)
▌2. James J. Couzens (R)

==== Minnesota ====
▌1. Henrik Shipstead (FL)
▌2. Thomas D. Schall (R)

==== Mississippi ====
▌1. Hubert D. Stephens (D)
▌2. Pat Harrison (D)

==== Missouri ====
▌1. Roscoe C. Patterson (R)
▌3. Harry B. Hawes (D), until February 3, 1933

▌Bennett Champ Clark (D), from February 3, 1933

==== Montana ====
▌1. Burton K. Wheeler (D)
▌2. Thomas J. Walsh (D), until March 2, 1933

==== Nebraska ====
▌1. Robert B. Howell (R)
▌2. George W. Norris (R)

==== Nevada ====
▌1. Key Pittman (D)
▌3. Tasker Oddie (R)

==== New Hampshire ====
▌2. Henry W. Keyes (R)
▌3. George H. Moses (R)

==== New Jersey ====
▌1. Hamilton Fish Kean (R)
▌2. Dwight Morrow (R), until October 5, 1931

▌William Warren Barbour (R), from December 1, 1931

==== New Mexico ====
▌1. Bronson M. Cutting (R)
▌2. Sam G. Bratton (D)

==== New York ====
▌1. Royal S. Copeland (D)
▌3. Robert F. Wagner (D)

==== North Carolina ====
▌2. Josiah William Bailey (D)
▌3. Cameron A. Morrison (D), until December 4, 1932

▌Robert R. Reynolds (D), from December 5, 1932

==== North Dakota ====
▌1. Lynn Frazier (R-NPL)
▌3. Gerald Nye (R)

==== Ohio ====
▌1. Simeon D. Fess (R)
▌3. Robert J. Bulkley (D)

==== Oklahoma ====
▌2. Thomas P. Gore (D)
▌3. Elmer Thomas (D)

==== Oregon ====
▌2. Charles L. McNary (R)
▌3. Frederick Steiwer (R)

==== Pennsylvania ====
▌1. David A. Reed (R)
▌3. James J. Davis (R)

==== Rhode Island ====
▌1. Felix Hebert (R)
▌2. Jesse H. Metcalf (R)

==== South Carolina ====
▌2. James F. Byrnes (D)
▌3. Ellison D. Smith (D)

==== South Dakota ====
▌2. William J. Bulow (D)
▌3. Peter Norbeck (R)

==== Tennessee ====
▌1. Kenneth McKellar (D)
▌2. Cordell Hull (D)

==== Texas ====
▌1. Tom T. Connally (D)
▌2. Morris Sheppard (D)

==== Utah ====
▌1. William H. King (D)
▌3. Reed Smoot (R)

==== Vermont ====
▌1. Porter H. Dale (R)
▌3. Frank C. Partridge (R), until March 31, 1931

▌Warren Austin (R), from April 1, 1931

==== Virginia ====
▌1. Claude A. Swanson (D)
▌2. Carter Glass (D)

==== Washington ====
▌1. Clarence Cleveland Dill (D)
▌3. Wesley L. Jones (R), until November 19, 1932

▌Elijah S. Grammer (R), from November 22, 1932

==== West Virginia ====
▌1. Henry D. Hatfield (R)
▌2. Matthew M. Neely (D)

==== Wisconsin ====
▌1. Robert M. La Follette Jr. (R)
▌3. John J. Blaine (R)

==== Wyoming ====
▌1. John B. Kendrick (D)
▌2. Robert D. Carey (R)

Senators' party membership by state at the opening of the 72nd Congress in March 1931. The green stripes denote Farmer-Labor Senator Henrik Shipstead. 2 Democrats 1 Democrat and 1 Republican 2 Republicans

=== House of Representatives ===
The names of representatives elected statewide on the general ticket or otherwise at-large, are preceded by an "At-large," and the names of those elected from districts, whether plural or single member, are preceded by their district numbers.

==== Alabama ====
▌1. John McDuffie (D)
▌2. J. Lister Hill (D)
▌3. Henry B. Steagall (D)
▌4. Lamar Jeffers (D)
▌5. LaFayette L. Patterson (D)
▌6. William B. Oliver (D)
▌7. Miles C. Allgood (D)
▌8. Edward B. Almon (D)
▌9. George Huddleston (D)
▌10. William B. Bankhead (D)

==== Arizona ====
▌At-large. Lewis W. Douglas (D)

==== Arkansas ====
▌1. William J. Driver (D)
▌2. John E. Miller (D)
▌3. Claude A. Fuller (D)
▌4. Effiegene L. Wingo (D)
▌5. Heartsill Ragon (D)
▌6. David D. Glover (D)
▌7. Tilman B. Parks (D)

==== California ====
▌1. Clarence F. Lea (D)
▌2. Harry L. Englebright (R)
▌3. Charles F. Curry Jr. (R)
▌4. Florence P. Kahn (R)
▌5. Richard J. Welch (R)
▌6. Albert E. Carter (R)
▌7. Henry E. Barbour (R)
▌8. Arthur M. Free (R)
▌9. William E. Evans (R)
▌10. Joe Crail (R)
▌11. Philip D. Swing (R)

==== Colorado ====
▌1. William R. Eaton (R)
▌2. Charles Bateman Timberlake (R)
▌3. Guy U. Hardy (R)
▌4. Edward T. Taylor (D)

==== Connecticut ====
▌1. Augustine Lonergan (D)
▌2. Richard P. Freeman (R)
▌3. John Q. Tilson (R), until December 3, 1932
▌4. William L. Tierney (D)
▌5. Edward W. Goss (R)

==== Delaware ====
▌At-large. Robert G. Houston (R)

==== Florida ====
▌1. Herbert J. Drane (D)
▌2. Robert A. Green (D)
▌3. Tom A. Yon (D)
▌4. Ruth Bryan Owen (D)

==== Georgia ====
▌1. Charles G. Edwards (D), until July 13, 1931

▌Homer C. Parker (D), from September 9, 1931

▌2. E. Eugene Cox (D)
▌3. Charles R. Crisp (D), until October 7, 1932

▌Bryant T. Castellow (D), from November 8, 1932

▌4. William C. Wright (D)
▌5. Robert Ramspeck (D)
▌6. Samuel Rutherford (D), until February 4, 1932

▌Carlton Mobley (D), from March 2, 1932

▌7. Malcolm C. Tarver (D)
▌8. Charles H. Brand (D)
▌9. John S. Wood (D)
▌10. Carl Vinson (D)
▌11. William C. Lankford (D)
▌12. William W. Larsen (D)

==== Idaho ====
▌1. Burton L. French (R)
▌2. Addison T. Smith (R)

==== Illinois ====
▌1. Oscar S. De Priest (R)
▌2. Morton D. Hull (R)
▌3. Edward A. Kelly (D)
▌4. Harry P. Beam (D)
▌5. Adolph J. Sabath (D)
▌6. James T. Igoe (D)
▌7. Leonard W. Schuetz (D)
▌8. Peter C. Granata (R), until April 5, 1932

▌Stanley H. Kunz (D), from April 5, 1932

▌9. Frederick A. Britten (R)
▌10. Carl R. Chindblom (R)
▌11. Frank R. Reid (R)
▌12. John T. Buckbee (R)
▌13. William R. Johnson (R)
▌14. John C. Allen (R)
▌15. Burnett M. Chiperfield (R)
▌16. William E. Hull (R)
▌17. Homer W. Hall (R)
▌18. William P. Holaday (R)
▌19. Charles Adkins (R)
▌20. Henry T. Rainey (D)
▌21. J. Earl Major (D)
▌22. Charles A. Karch (D), until November 6, 1932
▌23. William W. Arnold (D)
▌24. Claude V. Parsons (D)
▌25. Kent E. Keller (D)
▌At-large. William H. Dieterich (D)
▌At-large. Richard Yates Jr. (R)

==== Indiana ====
▌1. John W. Boehne Jr. (D)
▌2. Arthur H. Greenwood (D)
▌3. Eugene B. Crowe (D)
▌4. Harry C. Canfield (D)
▌5. Courtland C. Gillen (D)
▌6. William H. Larrabee (D)
▌7. Louis Ludlow (D)
▌8. Albert H. Vestal (R), until April 1, 1932
▌9. Fred S. Purnell (R)
▌10. William R. Wood (R)
▌11. Glenn Griswold (D)
▌12. David Hogg (R)
▌13. Samuel B. Pettengill (D)

==== Iowa ====
▌1. William F. Kopp (R)
▌2. Bernhard M. Jacobsen (D)
▌3. Thomas J. B. Robinson (R)
▌4. Gilbert N. Haugen (R)
▌5. Cyrenus Cole (R)
▌6. C. William Ramseyer (R)
▌7. Cassius C. Dowell (R)
▌8. Lloyd Thurston (R)
▌9. Charles E. Swanson (R)
▌10. Fred C. Gilchrist (R)
▌11. Ed H. Campbell (R)

==== Kansas ====
▌1. William P. Lambertson (R)
▌2. Ulysses S. Guyer (R)
▌3. Harold C. McGugin (R)
▌4. Homer Hoch (R)
▌5. James G. Strong (R)
▌6. Charles I. Sparks (R)
▌7. Clifford R. Hope (R)
▌8. William A. Ayres (D)

==== Kentucky ====
▌1. William V. Gregory (D)
▌2. Glover H. Cary (D)
▌3. John W. Moore (D)
▌4. Cap R. Carden (D)
▌5. Maurice H. Thatcher (R)
▌6. Brent Spence (D)
▌7. Virgil Chapman (D)
▌8. Ralph W. E. Gilbert (D)
▌9. Fred M. Vinson (D)
▌10. Andrew J. May (D)
▌11. Charles Finley (R)

==== Louisiana ====
▌1. Joachim O. Fernández (D)
▌2. Paul H. Maloney (D)
▌3. Numa F. Montet (D)
▌4. John N. Sandlin (D)
▌5. Riley Joseph Wilson (D)
▌6. Bolivar E. Kemp (D)
▌7. René L. De Rouen (D)
▌8. James Benjamin Aswell (D), until March 16, 1931

▌John H. Overton (D), from May 12, 1931

==== Maine ====
▌1. Carroll L. Beedy (R)
▌2. Donald B. Partridge (R)
▌3. John E. Nelson (R)
▌4. Donald F. Snow (R)

==== Maryland ====
▌1. T. Alan Goldsborough (D)
▌2. William P. Cole Jr. (D)
▌3. Vincent L. Palmisano (D)
▌4. J. Charles Linthicum (D), until October 5, 1932

▌Ambrose J. Kennedy (D), from November 8, 1932

▌5. Stephen W. Gambrill (D)
▌6. David J. Lewis (D)

==== Massachusetts ====
▌1. Allen T. Treadway (R)
▌2. William J. Granfield (D)
▌3. Frank H. Foss (R)
▌4. Pehr G. Holmes (R)
▌5. Edith Nourse Rogers (R)
▌6. A. Piatt Andrew Jr. (R)
▌7. William P. Connery Jr. (D)
▌8. Frederick W. Dallinger (R), until October 1, 1932
▌9. Charles L. Underhill (R)
▌10. John J. Douglass (D)
▌11. George H. Tinkham (R)
▌12. John W. McCormack (D)
▌13. Robert Luce (R)
▌14. Richard B. Wigglesworth (R)
▌15. Joseph W. Martin Jr. (R)
▌16. Charles L. Gifford (R)

==== Michigan ====
▌1. Robert H. Clancy (R)
▌2. Earl C. Michener (R)
▌3. Joseph L. Hooper (R)
▌4. John C. Ketcham (R)
▌5. Carl Mapes (R)
▌6. Seymour H. Person (R)
▌7. Jesse P. Wolcott (R)
▌8. Bird J. Vincent (R), until July 18, 1931

▌Michael J. Hart (D), from November 3, 1931

▌9. James C. McLaughlin (R), until November 29, 1932
▌10. Roy O. Woodruff (R)
▌11. Frank P. Bohn (R)
▌12. W. Frank James (R)
▌13. Clarence J. McLeod (R)

==== Minnesota ====
▌1. Victor Christgau (R)
▌2. Frank Clague (R)
▌3. August H. Andresen (R)
▌4. Melvin Maas (R)
▌5. William I. Nolan (R)
▌6. Harold Knutson (R)
▌7. Paul J. Kvale (FL)
▌8. William Pittenger (R)
▌9. Conrad Selvig (R)
▌10. Godfrey G. Goodwin (R), until February 16, 1933

==== Mississippi ====
▌1. John E. Rankin (D)
▌2. Wall Doxey (D)
▌3. William M. Whittington (D)
▌4. T. Jefferson Busby (D)
▌5. Ross A. Collins (D)
▌6. Robert S. Hall (D)
▌7. Percy E. Quin (D), until February 4, 1932

▌Lawrence R. Ellzey (D), from March 15, 1932

▌8. James W. Collier (D)

==== Missouri ====
▌1. Milton A. Romjue (D)
▌2. Ralph F. Lozier (D)
▌3. Jacob L. Milligan (D)
▌4. David W. Hopkins (R)
▌5. Joseph B. Shannon (D)
▌6. Clement C. Dickinson (D)
▌7. Samuel C. Major (D), until July 28, 1931

▌Robert D. Johnson (D), from September 29, 1931

▌8. William L. Nelson (D)
▌9. Clarence Cannon (D)
▌10. Henry F. Niedringhaus (R)
▌11. John J. Cochran (D)
▌12. Leonidas C. Dyer (R)
▌13. Clyde Williams (D)
▌14. James F. Fulbright (D)
▌15. Joe J. Manlove (R)
▌16. William E. Barton (D)

==== Montana ====
▌1. John M. Evans (D)
▌2. Scott Leavitt (R)

==== Nebraska ====
▌1. John H. Morehead (D)
▌2. Howard M. Baldrige (R)
▌3. Edgar Howard (D)
▌4. John N. Norton (D)
▌5. Ashton C. Shallenberger (D)
▌6. Robert G. Simmons (R)

==== Nevada ====
▌At-large. Samuel S. Arentz (R)

==== New Hampshire ====
▌1. Fletcher Hale (R), until October 22, 1931

▌William N. Rogers (D), from January 5, 1932

▌2. Edward H. Wason (R)

==== New Jersey ====
▌1. Charles A. Wolverton (R)
▌2. Isaac Bacharach (R)
▌3. William H. Sutphin (D)
▌4. Charles A. Eaton (R)
▌5. Ernest R. Ackerman (R), until October 18, 1931

▌Percy H. Stewart (D), from December 1, 1931

▌6. Randolph Perkins (R)
▌7. George N. Seger (R)
▌8. Fred A. Hartley Jr. (R)
▌9. Peter A. Cavicchia (R)
▌10. Frederick R. Lehlbach (R)
▌11. Oscar L. Auf der Heide (D)
▌12. Mary T. Norton (D)

==== New Mexico ====
▌At-large. Dennis Chávez (D)

==== New York ====
▌1. Robert L. Bacon (R)
▌2. William F. Brunner (D)
▌3. George W. Lindsay (D)
▌4. Thomas H. Cullen (D)
▌5. Loring M. Black Jr. (D)
▌6. Andrew L. Somers (D)
▌7. Matthew V. O'Malley (D), until May 26, 1931

▌ John J. Delaney (D), from November 3, 1931

▌8. Patrick J. Carley (D)
▌9. Stephen A. Rudd (D)
▌10. Emanuel Celler (D)
▌11. Anning S. Prall (D)
▌12. Samuel Dickstein (D)
▌13. Christopher D. Sullivan (D)
▌14. William I. Sirovich (D)
▌15. John J. Boylan (D)
▌16. John J. O'Connor (D)
▌17. Ruth Baker Pratt (R)
▌18. Martin J. Kennedy (D)
▌19. Sol Bloom (D)
▌20. Fiorello H. LaGuardia (R)
▌21. Joseph A. Gavagan (D)
▌22. Anthony J. Griffin (D)
▌23. Frank Oliver (D)
▌24. James M. Fitzpatrick (D)
▌25. Charles D. Millard (R)
▌26. Hamilton Fish III (R)
▌27. Harcourt J. Pratt (R)
▌28. Parker Corning (D)
▌29. James S. Parker (R)
▌30. Frank Crowther (R)
▌31. Bertrand H. Snell (R)
▌32. Francis D. Culkin (R)
▌33. Frederick M. Davenport (R)
▌34. John D. Clarke (R)
▌35. Clarence E. Hancock (R)
▌36. John Taber (R)
▌37. Gale H. Stalker (R)
▌38. James L. Whitley (R)
▌39. Archie D. Sanders (R)
▌40. Walter G. Andrews (R)
▌41. Edmund F. Cooke (R)
▌42. James M. Mead (D)
▌43. Daniel A. Reed (R)

==== North Carolina ====
▌1. Lindsay C. Warren (D)
▌2. John H. Kerr (D)
▌3. Charles L. Abernethy (D)
▌4. Edward W. Pou (D)
▌5. Franklin W. Hancock Jr. (D)
▌6. J. Bayard Clark (D)
▌7. J. Walter Lambeth (D)
▌8. Robert L. Doughton (D)
▌9. Alfred L. Bulwinkle (D)
▌10. Zebulon Weaver (D)

==== North Dakota ====
▌1. Olger B. Burtness (R)
▌2. Thomas Hall (R)
▌3. James H. Sinclair (R)

==== Ohio ====
▌1. Nicholas Longworth (R), until April 9, 1931

▌John B. Hollister (R), from November 3, 1931

▌2. William E. Hess (R)
▌3. Byron B. Harlan (D)
▌4. John L. Cable (R)
▌5. Frank C. Kniffin (D)
▌6. James G. Polk (D)
▌7. Charles Brand (R)
▌8. Grant E. Mouser Jr. (R)
▌9. Wilbur M. White (R)
▌10. Thomas A. Jenkins (R)
▌11. Mell G. Underwood (D)
▌12. Arthur P. Lamneck (D)
▌13. William L. Fiesinger (D)
▌14. Francis Seiberling (R)
▌15. C. Ellis Moore (R)
▌16. Charles B. McClintock (R)
▌17. Charles F. West (D)
▌18. B. Frank Murphy (R)
▌19. John G. Cooper (R)
▌20. Charles A. Mooney (D), until May 29, 1931

▌Martin L. Sweeney (D), from November 3, 1931

▌21. Robert Crosser (D)
▌22. Chester C. Bolton (R)

==== Oklahoma ====
▌1. Wesley E. Disney (D)
▌2. William W. Hastings (D)
▌3. Wilburn Cartwright (D)
▌4. Tom D. McKeown (D)
▌5. Fletcher B. Swank (D)
▌6. Jed J. Johnson (D)
▌7. James V. McClintic (D)
▌8. Milton C. Garber (R)

==== Oregon ====
▌1. Willis C. Hawley (R)
▌2. Robert R. Butler (R), until January 7, 1933
▌3. Charles H. Martin (D)

==== Pennsylvania ====
▌1. James M. Beck (R)
▌2. George S. Graham (R), until July 4, 1931

▌Edward L. Stokes (R), from November 3, 1931

▌3. Harry C. Ransley (R)
▌4. Benjamin M. Golder (R)
▌5. James J. Connolly (R)
▌6. George A. Welsh (R), until May 31, 1932

▌Robert L. Davis (R), from November 8, 1932

▌7. George P. Darrow (R)
▌8. James Wolfenden (R)
▌9. Henry Winfield Watson (R)
▌10. J. Roland Kinzer (R)
▌11. Patrick J. Boland (D)
▌12. C. Murray Turpin (R)
▌13. George F. Brumm (R)
▌14. Norton L. Lichtenwalner (D)
▌15. Louis T. McFadden (R)
▌16. Robert F. Rich (R)
▌17. Frederick W. Magrady (R)
▌18. Edward M. Beers (R), until April 21, 1932 (died)

▌Joseph F. Biddle (R), from November 8, 1932

▌19. Isaac H. Doutrich (R)
▌20. James R. Leech (R), until January 29, 1932

▌Howard W. Stull (R), from April 26, 1932

▌21. J. Banks Kurtz (R)
▌22. Harry L. Haines (D)
▌23. J. Mitchell Chase (R)
▌24. Samuel A. Kendall (R), until January 8, 1933
▌25. Henry W. Temple (R)
▌26. J. Howard Swick (R)
▌27. Nathan L. Strong (R)
▌28. Thomas C. Cochran (R)
▌29. Milton W. Shreve (R)
▌30. William R. Coyle (R)
▌31. Adam M. Wyant (R)
▌32. Edmund F. Erk (R)
▌33. M. Clyde Kelly (R)
▌34. Patrick J. Sullivan (R)
▌35. Harry A. Estep (R)
▌36. Guy E. Campbell (R)

==== Rhode Island ====
▌1. Clark Burdick (R)
▌2. Richard S. Aldrich (R)
▌3. Francis B. Condon (D)

==== South Carolina ====
▌1. Thomas S. McMillan (D)
▌2. Butler B. Hare (D)
▌3. Fred H. Dominick (D)
▌4. John J. McSwain (D)
▌5. William F. Stevenson (D)
▌6. Allard H. Gasque (D)
▌7. Hampton P. Fulmer (D)

==== South Dakota ====
▌1. Charles A. Christopherson (R)
▌2. Royal C. Johnson (R)
▌3. William Williamson (R)

==== Tennessee ====
▌1. Oscar Lovette (R)
▌2. J. Will Taylor (R)
▌3. Samuel D. McReynolds (D)
▌4. John Ridley Mitchell (D)
▌5. Ewin L. Davis (D)
▌6. Joseph W. Byrns (D)
▌7. Edward E. Eslick (D), until June 14, 1932

▌Willa M. B. Eslick (D), from August 14, 1932

▌8. Gordon Browning (D)
▌9. Jere Cooper (D)
▌10. Edward H. Crump (D)

==== Texas ====
▌1. Wright Patman (D)
▌2. Martin Dies Jr. (D)
▌3. Morgan G. Sanders (D)
▌4. Sam Rayburn (D)
▌5. Hatton W. Sumners (D)
▌6. Luther Alexander Johnson (D)
▌7. Clay Stone Briggs (D)
▌8. Daniel E. Garrett (D), until December 13, 1932

▌Joe H. Eagle (D), from January 28, 1933

▌9. Joseph J. Mansfield (D)
▌10. James P. Buchanan (D)
▌11. Oliver H. Cross (D)
▌12. Fritz G. Lanham (D)
▌13. Guinn Williams (D)
▌14. Harry M. Wurzbach (R), until November 6, 1931

▌Richard M. Kleberg (D), from November 24, 1931

▌15. John Nance Garner (D)
▌16. R. Ewing Thomason (D)
▌17. Thomas L. Blanton (D)
▌18. John Marvin Jones (D)

==== Utah ====
▌1. Don B. Colton (R)
▌2. Frederick C. Loofbourow (R)

==== Vermont ====
▌1. John E. Weeks (R)
▌2. Ernest Willard Gibson (R)

==== Virginia ====
▌1. S. Otis Bland (D)
▌2. Menalcus Lankford (R)
▌3. Andrew Jackson Montague (D)
▌4. Patrick H. Drewry (D)
▌5. Thomas G. Burch (D)
▌6. Clifton A. Woodrum (D)
▌7. John W. Fishburne (D)
▌8. Howard W. Smith (D)
▌9. John W. Flannagan Jr. (D)
▌10. Henry St. George Tucker III (D), until July 23, 1932

▌Joel W. Flood (D), from November 8, 1932

==== Washington ====
▌1. Ralph Horr (R)
▌2. Lindley H. Hadley (R)
▌3. Albert Johnson (R)
▌4. John W. Summers (R)
▌5. Samuel B. Hill (D)

==== West Virginia ====
▌1. Carl G. Bachmann (R)
▌2. Frank L. Bowman (R)
▌3. Lynn Hornor (D)
▌4. Robert L. Hogg (R)
▌5. Hugh Ike Shott (R)
▌6. Joe L. Smith (D)

==== Wisconsin ====
▌1. Thomas Ryum Amlie (R), from October 13, 1931
▌2. Charles A. Kading (R)
▌3. John M. Nelson (R)
▌4. John C. Schafer (R)
▌5. William H. Stafford (R)
▌6. Michael K. Reilly (D)
▌7. Gardner R. Withrow (R)
▌8. Gerald J. Boileau (R)
▌9. George J. Schneider (R)
▌10. James A. Frear (R)
▌11. Hubert H. Peavey (R)

==== Wyoming ====
▌At-large. Vincent Carter (R)

==== Non-voting members ====
▌Alaska Territory. James Wickersham (R)
▌Hawaii Territory. Victor S. K. Houston (R)
▌Philippines. Pedro Guevara (Nac.)
▌Philippines. Camilo Osías (Nac.)
▌Puerto Rico. Félix Córdova Dávila (UPR), until April 11, 1932

▌José Lorenzo Pesquera (Resident Commissioner) (I), from April 15, 1932

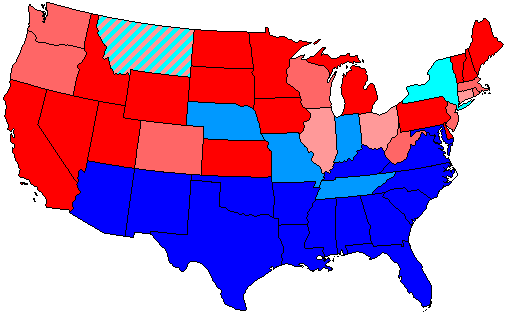
House seats by party holding plurality in state: 80+% to 100% Democratic / 80+% to 100% Republican; 60+% to 80% Democratic / 60+% to 80% Republican; Up to 60% Democratic / Up to 60% Republican

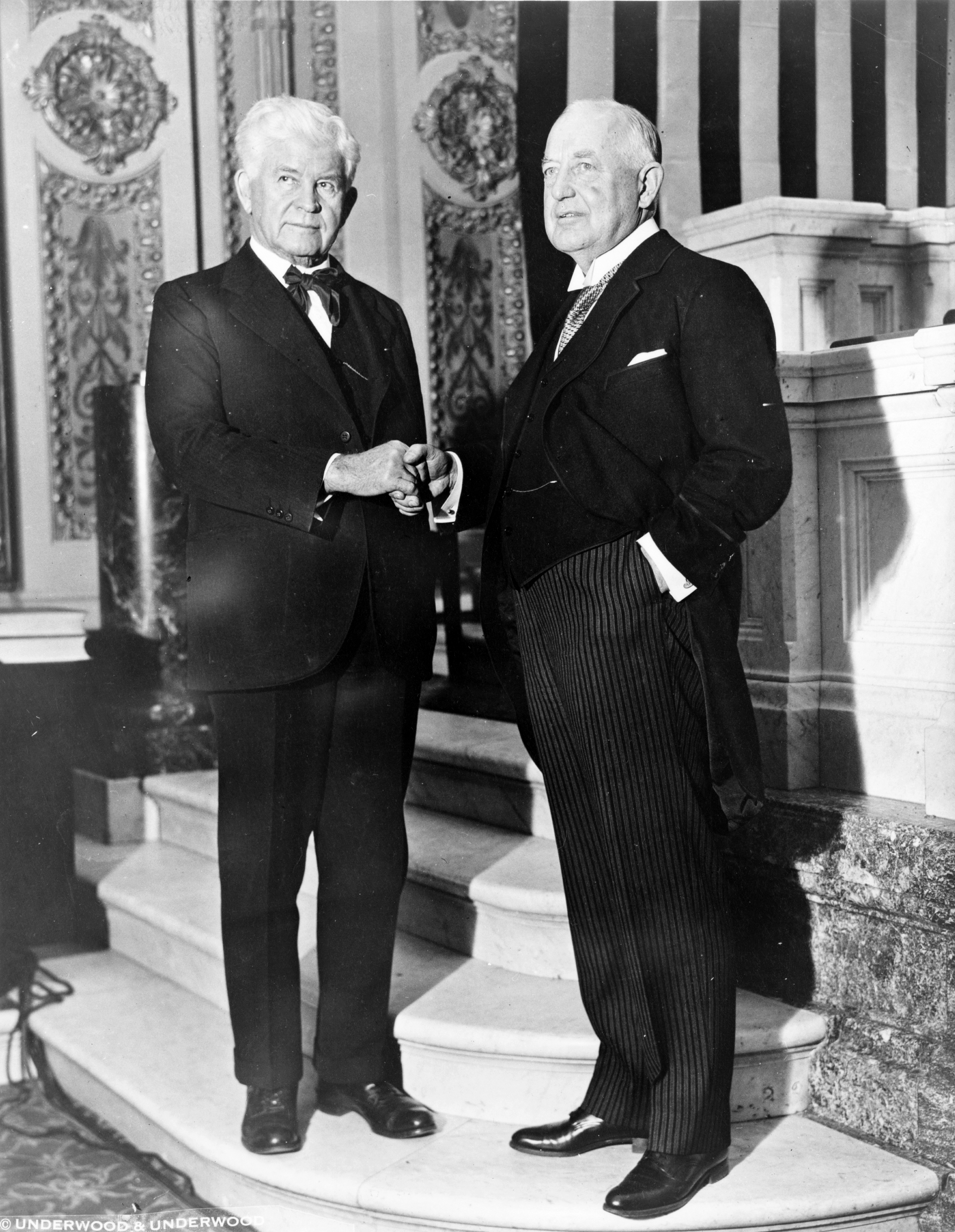
House Majority Leader Henry Rainey (D, left) and House Minority Leader Bertrand Snell (R, right), December 8, 1931

== Changes in membership ==
=== Senate ===
- Replacements: 11
  - Democratic: 1-seat net loss
  - Republican: no net change
- Deaths: 6
- Resignations: 1
- Interim appointments: 5
- Total seats with changes: 8

Senate changes
State (class)	Vacated by	Reason for change	Successor	Date of successor's formal installation (Note: When seated or oath administered, not necessarily when service began.)
Vermont (1)	Frank C. Partridge (R)	Interim appointee lost nomination to finish the term. Successor elected March 31, 1931.	Warren Austin (R)	April 1, 1931
New Jersey (2)	Dwight Morrow (R)	Died October 5, 1931. Successor was appointed and later elected.	William W. Barbour (R)	December 1, 1931
Arkansas (3)	Thaddeus H. Caraway (D)	Died November 6, 1931. Successor was appointed to finish the term.	Hattie Caraway (D)	November 13, 1931
Georgia (2)	William J. Harris (D)	Died April 18, 1932. Successor was appointed to finish the term.	John S. Cohen (D)	April 25, 1932
Colorado (3)	Charles W. Waterman (R)	Died August 27, 1932. Successor was appointed to finish the term.	Walter Walker (D)	September 26, 1932
Washington (3)	Wesley L. Jones (R)	Died November 19, 1932 having just lost re-election. Successor was appointed to finish the term.	Elijah S. Grammer (R)	November 22, 1932
Colorado (3)	Walter Walker (D)	Interim appointee lost election to finish term. Successor elected November 8, 1932.	Karl C. Schuyler (R)	December 7, 1932
North Carolina (3)	Cameron A. Morrison (D)	Interim appointee lost election to finish term. Successor elected November 8, 1932.	Robert R Reynolds (D)	December 5, 1932
Georgia (2)	John S. Cohen (D)	Interim appointee lost election to finish term. Successor elected January 12, 1933.	Richard Russell Jr. (D)	January 12, 1933
Missouri (3)	Harry B. Hawes (D)	Incumbent retired and then resigned early February 3, 1933. Successor appointed having already been elected.	Bennett Champ Clark (D)	February 3, 1933
Montana (2)	Thomas J. Walsh (D)	Died March 2, 1933; Seat remained vacant until next Congress	Vacant	

=== House of Representatives ===
- Replacements: 23
  - Democratic: 6 seat net gain
  - Republican: 6 seat net loss
- Deaths: 24
- Resignations: 7
- Contested election: 1
- Total seats with changes: 32

House changes
District	Vacated by	Reason for change	Successor	Date of successor's formal installation
Wisconsin 1st	Vacant	Representative Henry A. Cooper (R) died in previous congress.	Thomas R. Amlie (R)	October 13, 1931
Louisiana 8th	James B. Aswell (D)	Died March 16, 1931	John H. Overton (D)	May 12, 1931
Ohio 1st	Nicholas Longworth (R)	Died April 9, 1931	John B. Hollister (R)	November 3, 1931
New York 7th	Matthew V. O'Malley (D)	Died May 26, 1931. Because Congress was not in session at the time of his death, O'Malley never took his oath of office or exercised any of the duties of a Congressman. He was, nevertheless, serving in office from the beginning of his term on March 4, 1931.	John J. Delaney (D)	November 3, 1931
Ohio 20th	Charles A. Mooney (D)	Died May 29, 1931	Martin L. Sweeney (D)	November 3, 1931
Pennsylvania 2nd	George S. Graham (R)	Died July 4, 1931	Edward L. Stokes (R)	November 3, 1931
Georgia 1st	Charles G. Edwards (D)	Died July 13, 1931	Homer C. Parker (D)	September 9, 1931
Michigan 8th	Bird J. Vincent (R)	Died July 18, 1931	Michael J. Hart (D)	November 3, 1931
Missouri 7th	Samuel C. Major (D)	Died July 28, 1931	Robert D. Johnson (D)	September 29, 1931
New Jersey 5th	Ernest R. Ackerman (R)	Died October 18, 1931	Percy H. Stewart (D)	December 1, 1931
New Hampshire 1st	Fletcher Hale (R)	Died October 22, 1931	William N. Rogers (D)	January 5, 1932
Texas 14th	Harry M. Wurzbach (R)	Died November 6, 1931	Richard M. Kleberg (D)	November 24, 1931
Pennsylvania 20th	James R. Leech (R)	Resigned January 29, 1932, to become a member of the United States Board of Tax Appeals	Howard W. Stull (R)	April 26, 1932
Mississippi 7th	Percy Quin (D)	Died February 4, 1932	Lawrence R. Ellzey (D)	March 15, 1932
Georgia 6th	Samuel Rutherford (D)	Died February 4, 1932	Carlton Mobley (D)	March 2, 1932
Indiana 8th	Albert H. Vestal (R)	Died April 1, 1932	Seat remained vacant until next Congress.	
Illinois 8th	Peter C. Granata (R)	Lost contested election April 5, 1932	Stanley H. Kunz (D)	April 5, 1932
Puerto Rico at-large	Félix Córdova Dávila	resigned April 11, 1932, to become Associate Justice of the Supreme Court of Puerto Rico	José Lorenzo Pesquera	April 15, 1932
Massachusetts 8th	Frederick W. Dallinger (R)	Resigned October 1, 1932	Seat remained vacant until next Congress.	
Pennsylvania 18th	Edward M. Beers (R)	Died April 21, 1932	Joseph F. Biddle (R)	November 8, 1932
Pennsylvania 6th	George A. Welsh (R)	Resigned May 31, 1932, to become judge for the United States District Court for the Eastern District of Pennsylvania	Robert L. Davis (R)	November 8, 1932
Tennessee 7th	Edward E. Eslick (D)	Died June 14, 1932	Willa McCord Blake Eslick (D)	August 14, 1932
Virginia 10th	Henry St. George Tucker III (D)	Died July 23, 1932	Joel W. Flood (D)	November 8, 1932
Maryland 4th	J. Charles Linthicum (D)	Died October 5, 1932	Ambrose J. Kennedy (D)	November 8, 1932
Georgia 3rd	Charles R. Crisp (D)	Resigned October 7, 1932, to become a member of the US Tariff Commission	Bryant T. Castellow (D)	November 8, 1932
Illinois 22nd	Charles A. Karch (D)	Resigned November 6, 1932	Seat remained vacant until next Congress.	
Michigan 9th	James C. McLaughlin (R)	Died November 29, 1932	Seat remained vacant until next Congress.	
Connecticut 3rd	John Q. Tilson (R)	Resigned December 3, 1932	Seat remained vacant until next Congress.	
Texas 8th	Daniel E. Garrett (D)	Died December 13, 1932	Joe H. Eagle (D)	January 28, 1933
Oregon 2nd	Robert R. Butler (R)	Died January 7, 1933	Seat remained vacant until next Congress.	
Pennsylvania 24th	Samuel A. Kendall (R)	Died January 8, 1933	Seat remained vacant until next Congress.	
Minnesota 10th	Godfrey G. Goodwin (R)	Died February 16, 1933	Seat remained vacant until next Congress.	

== Committees ==
Lists of committees and their party leaders for members of the House and Senate committees can be found through the Official Congressional Directory at the bottom of this article. The directory after the pages of terms of service lists committees of the Senate, House (Standing with Subcommittees, Select and Special) and Joint and, after that, House/Senate committee assignments. On the committees section of the House and Senate in the Official Congressional Directory, the committee's members on the first row on the left side shows the chairman of the committee and on the right side shows the ranking member of the committee.

=== Senate ===
- Agriculture and Forestry (Chairman: Charles L. McNary; Ranking Member: Ellison D. Smith)
- Air Mail and Ocean Mail Contracts (Special)
- Alaska Railroad (Special Select)
- Appropriations (Chairman: Wesley L. Jones; Ranking Member: William J. Harris)
- Audit and Control the Contingent Expenses of the Senate (Chairman: John G. Townsend Jr.; Ranking Member: John B. Kendrick)
- Banking and Currency (Chairman: Peter Norbeck; Ranking Member: Duncan U. Fletcher)
- Civil Service (Chairman: Porter H. Dale; Ranking Member: Kenneth McKellar)
- Claims (Chairman: Robert B. Howell; Ranking Member: Park Trammell)
- Commerce (Chairman: Hiram W. Johnson; Ranking Member: Duncan U. Fletcher)
- Depreciation of Foreign Currencies (Select)
- District of Columbia (Chairman: Arthur Capper; Ranking Member: William H. King)
- Education and Labor (Chairman: Jesse H. Metcalf; Ranking Member: Royal S. Copeland)
- Enrolled Bills (Chairman: Frank L. Greene; Ranking Member: Coleman L. Blease)
- Expenditures in Executive Departments (Chairman: Frederick M. Sackett then Guy D. Goff; Ranking Member: Claude A. Swanson)
- Finance (Chairman: Reed Smoot; Ranking Member: Furnifold M. Simmons)
- Foreign Relations (Chairman: William E. Borah; Ranking Member: Claude A. Swanson)
- Immigration (Chairman: Arthur R. Gould; Ranking Member: William H. King)
- Indian Affairs (Chairman: Lynn J. Frazier; Ranking Member: Henry F. Ashurst)
- Interoceanic Canals (Chairman: Thomas D. Schall; Ranking Member: Thomas J. Walsh)
- Interstate Commerce (Chairman: James Couzens; Ranking Member: Ellison D. Smith)
- Irrigation and Reclamation (Chairman: John Thomas; Ranking Member: Morris Sheppard)
- Judiciary (Chairman: George W. Norris; Ranking Member: Lee S. Overman then Henry F. Ashurst)
- Library (Chairman: Simeon D. Fess; Ranking Member: Kenneth McKellar)
- Manufactures (Chairman: Robert M. La Follette Jr.; Ranking Member: Ellison D. Smith)
- Military Affairs (Chairman: David A. Reed; Ranking Member: Duncan U. Fletcher)
- Mines and Mining (Chairman: Roscoe C. Patterson; Ranking Member: Thomas J. Walsh)
- Mississippi Flood Control Project (Select)
- Naval Affairs (Chairman: Frederick Hale; Ranking Member: Claude A. Swanson)
- Patents (Chairman: Charles W. Waterman; Ranking Member: Ellison D. Smith)
- Pensions (Chairman: Arthur R. Robinson; Ranking Member: Burton K. Wheeler)
- Post Office Leases (Select)
- Post Office and Post Roads (Chairman: Lawrence C. Phipps; Ranking Member: Kenneth McKellar)
- Printing (Chairman: George H. Moses; Ranking Member: Duncan U. Fletcher)
- Privileges and Elections (Chairman: Samuel M. Shortridge; Ranking Member: William H. King)
- Public Buildings and Grounds (Chairman: Henry W. Keyes; Ranking Member: Duncan U. Fletcher)
- Public Lands and Surveys (Chairman: Gerald P. Nye; Ranking Member: Key Pittman)
- Reconstruction Finance Corporation (Select)
- Rules (Chairman: George H. Moses; Ranking Member: Lee S. Overman then Pat Harrison)
- Territories and Insular Affairs (Chairman: Hiram Bingham; Ranking Member: Key Pittman)
- Whole

=== House of Representatives ===
- Accounts (Chairman: Charles L. Underhill; Ranking Member: Lindsay C. Warren)
- Agriculture (Chairman: Gilbert N. Haugen; Ranking Member: James B. Aswell)
- Appropriations (Chairman: William R. Wood; Ranking Member: Joseph W. Byrns)
- Banking and Currency (Chairman: Louis T. McFadden; Ranking Member: Otis Wingo then John E. Rankin)
- Census (Chairman: E. Hart Fenn; Ranking Member: John E. Rankin)
- Civil Service (Chairman: Frederick R. Lehlbach; Ranking Member: Lamar Jeffers)
- Claims (Chairman: Edward M. Irwin; Ranking Member: John C. Box)
- Coinage, Weights and Measures (Chairman: Randolph Perkins; Ranking Member: Edgar Howard)
- Disposition of Executive Papers (Chairman: Edward H. Wason; Ranking Member: Robert A. Green)
- District of Columbia (Chairman: Frederick N. Zihlman; Ranking Member: Christopher D. Sullivan)
- Education (Chairman: Daniel A. Reed; Ranking Member: Loring M. Black)
- Election of the President, Vice President and Representatives in Congress (Chairman: Charles L. Gifford; Ranking Member: Lamar Jeffers)
- Elections No.#1 (Chairman: Carroll L. Beedy; Ranking Member: Edward E. Eslick)
- Elections No.#2 (Chairman: Bird J. Vincent; Ranking Member: John J. Douglass)
- Elections No.#3 (Chairman: Willis G. Sears; Ranking Member: John H. Kerr)
- Enrolled Bills (Chairman: Guy E. Campbell; Ranking Member: Mell G. Underwood)
- Expenditures in the Executive Departments (Chairman: William Williamson; Ranking Member: Allard H. Gasque)
- Flood Control (Chairman: Frank R. Reid; Ranking Member: Riley J. Wilson)
- Foreign Affairs (Chairman: Stephen G. Porter; Ranking Member: J. Charles Linthicum)
- Immigration and Naturalization (Chairman: Albert Johnson; Ranking Member: John C. Box)
- Indian Affairs (Chairman: Scott Leavitt; Ranking Member: John M. Evans)
- Insular Affairs (Chairman: Edgar R. Kiess; Ranking Member: Christopher D. Sullivan)
- Interstate and Foreign Commerce (Chairman: James S. Parker; Ranking Member: Sam Rayburn)
- Invalid Pensions (Chairman: John M. Nelson; Ranking Member: Mell G. Underwood)
- Irrigation and Reclamation (Chairman: Addison T. Smith; Ranking Member: C. B. Hudspeth)
- Judiciary (Chairman: George S. Graham; Ranking Member: Hatton W. Sumners)
- Labor (Chairman: William F. Kopp; Ranking Member: William P. Connery Jr.)
- Library (Chairman: Robert Luce; Ranking Member: Lindsay C. Warren)
- Memorials (Chairman: Burton L. French; Ranking Member: N/A)
- Merchant Marine and Fisheries (Chairman: Wallace H. White Jr.; Ranking Member: Ewin L. Davis)
- Military Affairs (Chairman: W. Frank James; Ranking Member: Percy E. Quin)
- Mines and Mining (Chairman: William H. Sproul; Ranking Member: Arthur H. Greenwood)
- Naval Affairs (Chairman: Frederick A. Britten; Ranking Member: Carl Vinson)
- Patents (Chairman: Albert H. Vestal; Ranking Member: Fritz G. Lanham)
- Pensions (Chairman: Harold Knutson; Ranking Member: Allard H. Gasque)
- Post Office and Post Roads (Chairman: Archie D. Sanders; Ranking Member: Thomas M. Bell)
- Printing (Chairman: Edward M. Beers; Ranking Member: William F. Stevenson)
- Public Buildings and Grounds (Chairman: Richard N. Elliott; Ranking Member: Fritz G. Lanham)
- Public Lands (Chairman: Don B. Colton; Ranking Member: John M. Evans)
- Revision of Laws (Chairman: Roy G. Fitzgerald; Ranking Member: Loring M. Black)
- Rivers and Harbors (Chairman: S. Wallace Dempsey; Ranking Member: Joseph J. Mansfield)
- Roads (Chairman: Cassius C. Dowell; Ranking Member: Edward B. Almon)
- Rules (Chairman: Bertrand H. Snell; Ranking Member: Edward W. Pou)
- Standards of Official Conduct
- Territories (Chairman: Charles F. Curry; Ranking Member: William C. Lankford)
- War Claims (Chairman: James G. Strong; Ranking Member: Miles C. Allgood)
- Ways and Means (Chairman: Willis C. Hawley; Ranking Member: John N. Garner)
- World War Veterans' Legislation (Chairman: Royal C. Johnson; Ranking Member: John E. Rankin)
- Whole

=== Joint committees ===
- Conditions of Indian Tribes (Special)
- Disposition of (Useless) Executive Papers
- The Library (Chairman: Sen. Simeon D. Fess)
- Printing (Chairman: Sen. George H. Moses then Duncan U. Fletcher; Vice Chairman: Rep. Edgar R. Kiess)
- Taxation (Chairman: Rep. Willis C. Hawley)
- Veterans' Affairs

== Caucuses ==
- Democratic (House)
- Democratic (Senate)

== Employees ==
=== Legislative branch agency directors ===
- Architect of the Capitol: David Lynn
- Attending Physician of the United States Congress: George Calver
- Comptroller General of the United States: John R. McCarl
- Librarian of Congress: Herbert Putnam
- Public Printer of the United States: George H. Carter

=== Senate ===
- Chaplain: ZeBarney T. Phillips (Episcopalian)
- Secretary: Edwin P. Thayer
- Librarian: James D. Preston
- Sergeant at Arms: David S. Barry
- Democratic Party Secretary: Edwin A. Halsey
- Republican Party Secretary: Carl A. Loeffler

=== House of Representatives ===
- Chaplain: James S. Montgomery (Methodist)
- Clerk: South Trimble
- Doorkeeper: Joseph J. Sinnott
- Parliamentarian: Lewis Deschler
- Postmaster: Finis E. Scott
- Reading Clerks: Patrick Joseph Haltigan (D) and Alney E. Chaffee (R)
- Sergeant at Arms: Joseph G. Rodgers, until December 7, 1931
  - Kenneth Romney, from December 7, 1931

== See also ==
- 1930 United States elections (elections leading to this Congress)
  - 1930 United States Senate elections
  - 1930 United States House of Representatives elections
- 1932 United States elections (elections during this Congress, leading to the next Congress)
  - 1932 United States presidential election
  - 1932 United States Senate elections
  - 1932 United States House of Representatives elections
