= Herbert J. McGlinchey =

American politician

Member of the Pennsylvania Senate from the 5th district
- In office January 5, 1965 – November 30, 1972
- Preceded by: Israel Stiefel
- Succeeded by: Charles Dougherty

Member of the U.S. House of Representatives from Pennsylvania's 6th district
- In office January 3, 1945 – January 3, 1947
- Preceded by: Francis Myers
- Succeeded by: Hugh Scott

Personal details
- Born: Herbert Joseph McGlinchey; November 7, 1904 Philadelphia, Pennsylvania, US
- Died: June 25, 1992 (aged 87)
- Party: Democratic

Herbert Joseph McGlinchey (November 7, 1904 – June 25, 1992) was an American politician from Pennsylvania who served as a Democratic member of the U.S. House of Representatives for Pennsylvania's 6th congressional district from 1945 to 1947 and the Pennsylvania Senate for the 5th district from 1965 to 1972.

== Biography ==
McGlinchey was born in Philadelphia, Pennsylvania on November 7, 1904. He worked as a manufacturers’ agent, and supervisor of labor and industry for the eastern district of Pennsylvania, from 1935 to 1937. He was a delegate to Democratic National Convention in 1936.

=== Congress ===
He was elected as a Democrat to the 79th Congress in 1944. He was an unsuccessful candidate in 1946, 1948, and 1956. He was a member of the Pennsylvania Tax Equalization Board from 1957 to 1963 and a member of the Pennsylvania State Senate from 1965 to 1972. A longtime Philadelphia 42nd ward leader, he won in 1974 by moving the ward leader election to a bus with only his supporters.

=== Death ===
He died on June 25, 1992.

== Sources ==
- United States Congress. "Herbert J. McGlinchey (id: M000451)". Biographical Directory of the United States Congress.

U.S. House of Representatives
Preceded by Francis Myers	Member of the U.S. House of Representatives from Pennsylvania's 6th congressional district 1945–1947	Succeeded by Hugh Scott
Pennsylvania State Senate
Preceded by Israel Stiefel	Member of the Pennsylvania Senate for the 5th District; 1965–1972	Succeeded by Charles Dougherty
