= William T. Ramsey =

American politician (1873–1937)

Member of Pennsylvania House of Representatives from the Delaware County district
- In office 1913–1920
- Preceded by: V. Gilpin Robinson
- Succeeded by: Harry Hannum Heyburn

Mayor, Chester, Pennsylvania
- In office 1920–1924
- Preceded by: Wesley S. McDowell
- Succeeded by: Samuel E. Turner

Personal details
- Born: January 8, 1873 Philadelphia, Pennsylvania, U.S.
- Died: December 12, 1937 (aged 64) Chester, Pennsylvania, U.S.
- Resting place: Lawn Croft Cemetery, Linwood, Pennsylvania, U.S.
- Party: Republican
- Relatives: Anne Ramsey (Niece)

William T. Ramsey (January 8, 1873 – December 12, 1937) was an American politician from Pennsylvania who served as a Republican member of the Pennsylvania House of Representatives for Delaware County from 1913 to 1920. Ramsey served as Majority Leader from 1917 to 1920. He also served on the Chester City Council from 1907 to 1911 and as mayor of Chester, Pennsylvania from 1920 to 1924.

== Early life and education ==
Ramsey was born in Philadelphia, Pennsylvania to William and Elizabeth (Johnson) Ramsey. He attended public school in Eddystone and Chester until he was fourteen years old.

Ramsey became a messenger boy for the Eddystone Print Works, carrying message between the Eddystone and Philadelphia offices. He moved up to higher positions within the company and left in 1901 to join the Consumers' Ice and Coal Company. He became the general manager of Consumers' Ice and Coal Company in 1908

== Political career ==
Ramsey was elected to the Chester City Council in 1907, was made president of the council in 1910 and served until 1911.

Ramsey was elected to the Pennsylvania House of Representatives for the Delaware County district for the 1913 terms and was reelected for 3 consecutive terms. He served a Majority Leader in the House from 1917 to 1920. He was not a candidate for reelection in 1920.

In 1920, Ramsey was elected mayor of Chester, Pennsylvania and served until 1924 when he was replaced by Republican Samuel E. Turner.

Ramsey served as tax collector for Chester from 1930 to 1931 and was elected commissioner, Delaware County in 1932.

== Personal life ==
In 1898, Ramsey married Evaline Bleacham and together they had one son. He was a District Deputy Grand Exalted Ruler of the Pennsylvania Southeast district of the Elks from 1926 to 1927. Ramsey is interred at the Lawn Croft Cemetery in Linwood, Pennsylvania.

== See also ==
- List of mayors of Chester, Pennsylvania

Political offices
Preceded by	Chester City Council; 1907–1911	Succeeded by
Pennsylvania House of Representatives
Preceded by V. Gilpin Robinson	Member of the Pennsylvania House of Representatives, Delaware County; 1913–1920	Succeeded by Harry Hannum Heyburn
Political offices
Preceded by Wesley S. McDowell	Mayor of Chester, Pennsylvania; 1920–1924	Succeeded by Samuel E. Turner
