= Walter Stuempfig =

Walter Stuempfig (January 26, 1914 – November 29, 1970) was an American artist and teacher.

== Biography ==
He was born in Germantown, Philadelphia, Pennsylvania on January 26, 1914, to a moderately wealthy family.

After graduation from the Germantown Academy, he enrolled as an architecture student in the University of Pennsylvania. In October 1931 he transferred to the Pennsylvania Academy of the Fine Arts, where his instructors included Henry McCarter, Daniel Garber, and Francis Speight. From 1932 to 1966 he exhibited regularly at the Pennsylvania Academy's Annual Exhibitions.

In 1935 he married Lila Hill, a sculptor who had also studied at the academy.

Stuempfig was a prolific painter whose works number over 1500. His paintings sold steadily; purchasers from his first solo show in New York in 1943 included the Whitney Museum and the Museum of Modern Art. He painted figure compositions, landscapes and architectural subjects, still lifes, and portraits; all in a style of romantic realism that fell outside the artistic mainstream of his time. Robert Sturgis Ingersoll has written of him:

A layman's chat with him would constitute a lesson in late 16th century and early 17th century Italian art. His heroes were Caravaggio, Degas and Eakins. One would risk acrimonious rebuttal if making a disparaging remark with respect to any one of them and earn a more violent rebuttal to a remark in praise of American Expressionism.

From 1948 to 1970 he taught composition and drawing at the Pennsylvania Academy of the Fine Arts.

He died in Ocean City, New Jersey at the home of his aunt, on November 29, 1970. He was interred at the cemetery of St. David's Episcopal Church in Radnor, Pennsylvania.
