= Michael J. Stack =

American politician

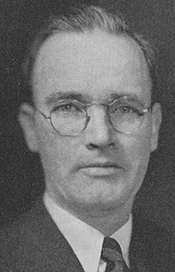

Member of the U.S. House of Representatives from Pennsylvania's 6th district
- In office January 3, 1935 – January 3, 1939
- Preceded by: Edward L. Stokes
- Succeeded by: Francis J. Myers

Personal details
- Born: September 29, 1888 Listowel, County Kerry, Ireland, U.K.
- Died: December 14, 1960 (aged 72) Philadelphia, Pennsylvania, U.S.
- Party: Democratic
- Education: St. Mary's University

Michael Joseph Stack (September 29, 1888 – December 14, 1960) was a U.S. representative from Pennsylvania from 1935 to 1939. His grandson is former Pennsylvania Lieutenant Governor Michael J. Stack III.

== Biography ==
Stack was born in Listowel in County Kerry on the island of Ireland (the entirety of which was then part of the U.K.). He immigrated to the United States in 1903 and settled in Philadelphia. He attended St. Josephs College in Philadelphia and graduated from St. Mary's University in Baltimore, Maryland, in 1910. He was employed by a railroad company in Detroit, Michigan, from 1910 to 1917. During the First World War, he enlisted on July 17, 1917, as a private in the Medical Detachment, Three Hundred and Sixtieth Infantry. After the war, he became engaged in the real estate business in Philadelphia.

Stack was elected as a Democrat to the Seventy-fourth and Seventy-fifth Congresses. He was an unsuccessful Democratic candidate for renomination in 1938 and was an unsuccessful Royal Oak candidate for reelection in 1938. He resumed the real estate business, and died in Philadelphia. He is interred in St. Denis Cemetery in Havertown, Pennsylvania.

U.S. House of Representatives
Preceded by Edward L. Stokes	Member of the U.S. House of Representatives from Pennsylvania's 6th congressional district 1935–1939	Succeeded by Francis J. Myers
