= St. David's Episcopal Church (Radnor, Pennsylvania) =

Historic church in Pennsylvania, United States

- St. David's Church and Graveyard
- U.S. National Register of Historic Places
- Pennsylvania state historical marker
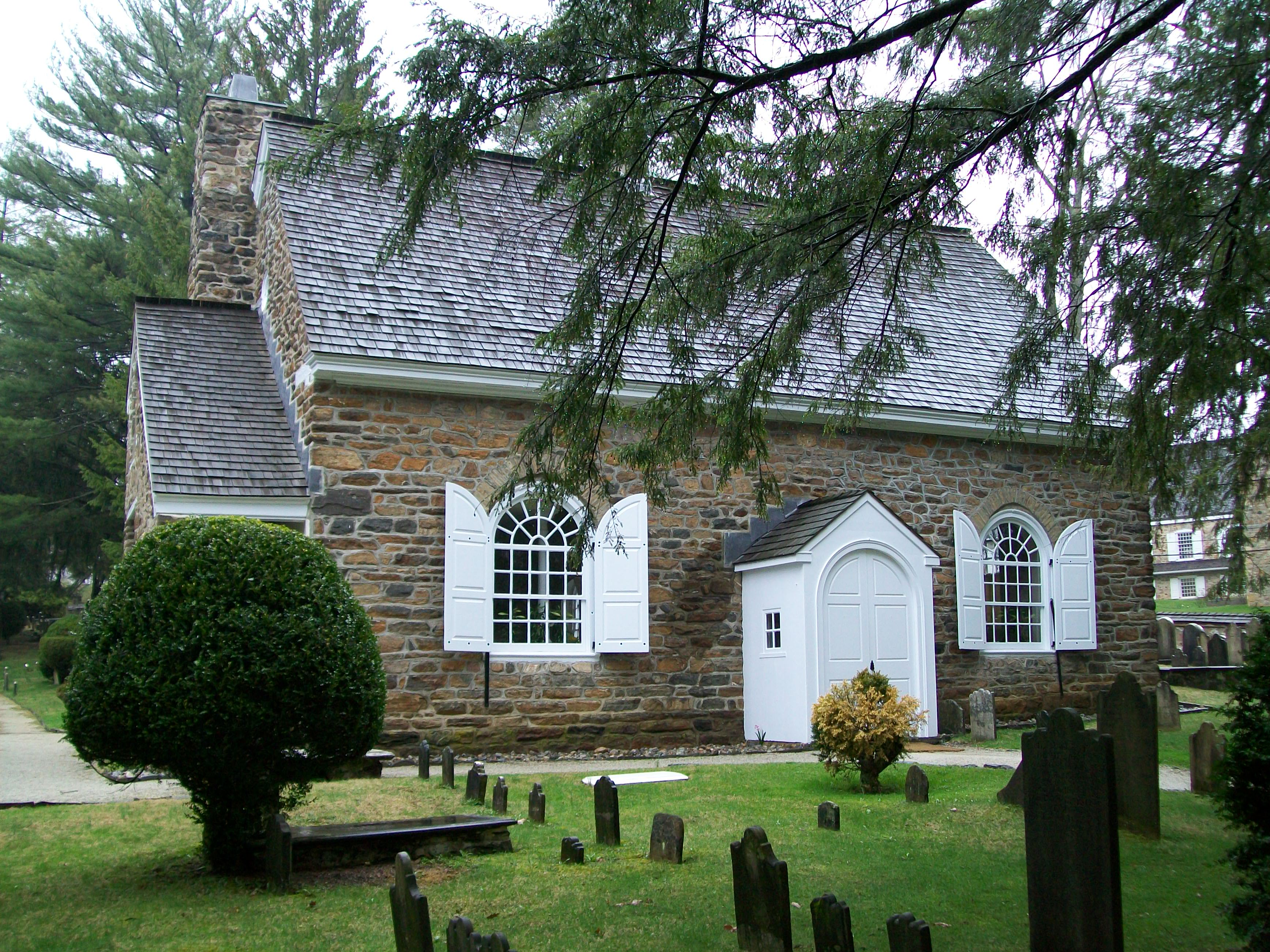
- St. David's, April 2009

- Location within Pennsylvania Location within the United States
- Location: 763 South Valley Forge Road, Radnor Township, Pennsylvania, U.S.
- Coordinates: 40°1′38″N 75°24′16″W
- Area: 1 acre (0.40 ha)
- Built: 1715
- NRHP reference No.: 78002394

Significant dates
- Added to NRHP: September 20, 1978
- Designated PHMC: October 13, 1947

St. David's Episcopal Church, also known as St. David's at Radnor or Old St. David's, is a parish of the Episcopal Church located at 763 South Valley Forge Road in Radnor Township, Pennsylvania. The church property contains the original church built in 1715, a chapel, church offices, school and cemetery. The property straddles the borders of Radnor Township and Newtown Township in Delaware County and the majority of the cemetery is in Easttown Township, Chester County. It was founded c. 1700 in the Welsh Tract section of the Province of Pennsylvania by Welsh settlers and has grown to be the largest congregation in the Episcopal Diocese of Pennsylvania with approximately 3,000 members.

The original church and cemetery were placed on the National Register of Historic Places in 1978.

== History ==
=== Founding ===
After the establishment of the Welsh Tract in the colony of Pennsylvania, the area was settled by numerous emigrants from Wales, particularly Welsh Quakers, although Welsh people of other faiths, drawn by Pennsylvania's religious toleration and the opportunity to conduct their affairs in their own language, settled the area as well. In those days, life on the frontier saw exercise of religious beliefs in a limited way (frequently without houses of worship or clergy), which became a concern to many. The Society for the Propagation of the Gospel in Foreign Parts, in London, sent the Welsh Anglican Rev. Evan Evans to the area as a circuit missionary. He began holding fortnightly services in private houses, including that of William Davis in the area known as Radnor, in the southern part of the Welsh Tract, starting November, 1700. The first mention of a church is in 1700 with historical records mentioning a church made of logs at the location of the current old stone church which was intended to also be used as a shelter against potential attacks from native Americans.

In 1708, John Oldmixon in his book The British Empire in America noted that

Within land lies Radnor or Welshtown, finely situate and well watered, containing about fifty families; in this place is a congregation of Church of England-Men, but no settled minister

After Rev. Evans' departure, the Welsh-speaking Anglicans of Radnor sent the Society a 100-signature petition requesting a shipment of Welsh-language prayer books and Bibles, and especially requesting another Welsh-speaking missionary. A complete response was apparently slow in coming; ten years later, upon meeting their new leader, the parishioners "heartily engaged themselves to build a handsome stone church to be named after the Patron Saint of Wales". The cornerstone of the new building was laid on May 9, 1715. In an unusual expression of solidarity between denominations, several other clergymen assisted with the laying of the foundation, including Pastor Andreas Sandel of Old Swedes Church in Philadelphia. A floor was not added to the church until 1765. The building still stands, and seats 100 in old-fashioned box pews; the current organ is not original, having been built in 1952.

An early pastor, the Rev. John Clubb, who served from about 1707 to 1715, and later the Rev. Robert Weyman, who served during the 1720s, were paid by the Society for the Propagation of the Gospel in Foreign Parts and shared duties between St. David's and Old Trinity Church, located about 20 miles to the east in Oxford.

=== Revolutionary and Federal periods ===
With the coming of the American Revolution in the colonies, a wave of resentment against the Church of England (which professed loyalty to the king) arose among the congregation. A leader of this opposition was Anthony Wayne, a lifelong member of St. David's who was later appointed major general of the American forces. The rector, the Rev. William Currie, bound by his oath of duty to the king, resigned his position, which remained officially vacant for 12 years (Rev. Currie performed marriages, baptisms, and the like privately until at least 1783). During the war, no services were held in the church. The church building provided shelter for soldiers of both sides and Continental Army soldiers cut the lead out of the windows of the church to use as bullets. After the nearby Battle of Brandywine, sixteen British soldiers were buried in the cemetery at St. David's.

While St. David's left the organization of the Church of England, it remained in the Anglican Communion, and the church was represented at the first General Convention of the Protestant Episcopal Church of the United States in 1784, after the peace treaty was signed.

The church was formally incorporated and chartered in August 1792. A church school was organized in 1820. The first confirmation services were conducted by Bishop William White, who became the first Presiding Bishop. The first physical addition to the church holdings was the fieldstone "Old Rectory" in 1844.

=== Suburbanization ===
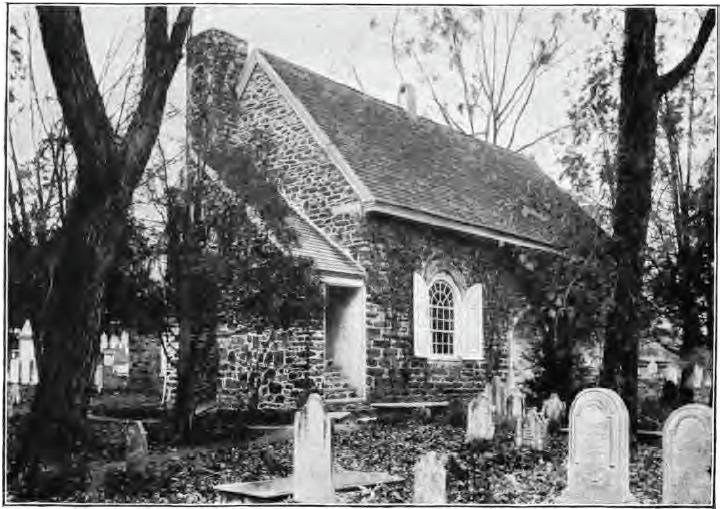
Photograph of St. David's Church circa 1907.

After the construction of the "main line" of the Pennsylvania Railroad in 1832, the once-isolated community began to evolve more rapidly, particularly after the railroad built local stations and offered frequent train service in the Philadelphia area. One of the way stations on the Main Line was named St. Davids for the church (the station is approximately 3 miles/4 km from the church), and a community of the same name grew up around the station. The community has no post office of its own, and is served by the nearby Wayne post office. As Philadelphians began to live outside the city in the late 19th century, the church's parishioners became more suburban.

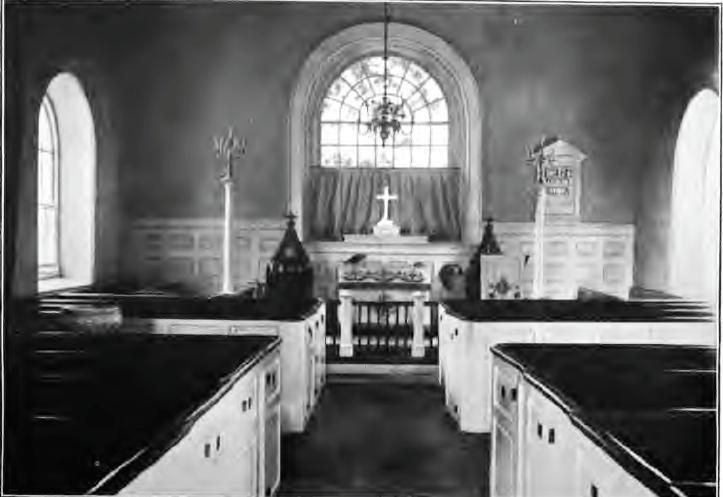
Interior photograph of St. David's Church circa 1907.

As the congregation grew, the parish expanded accordingly. A parish house (office building), with church school facilities, was built in 1924 and enlarged in 1950. Further growth of the congregation led to heated discussion over whether the parish should accommodate a burgeoning membership or retain its early character; this was resolved by the 1956 construction of a new worship building, several times the size of the original church.

On October 13, 1947, a Pennsylvania Historical Marker was placed at St. David's Church to recognize the historical importance of the site. The old church built in 1715 and cemetery were placed on the National Register of Historic Places on September 20, 1978.

A separate building was built for Sunday school classes in 1965, the year the parish celebrated its 250th anniversary at a service attended by the Bishop of St David's in Wales. The building is named the Knewstub Building for a former rector of the parish.

Continued growth of the congregation rendered the chapel too small by the time it was 50 years old. A new, larger chapel, seating 650, was constructed adjacent to the old one in 2006. A three-manual, 48-stop, mechanical action organ was installed in 2007. The old chapel, its pews, etc., removed, is now named St. David's Hall, hosting receptions after services and other church-related activities, and serving as a connector between the new chapel and the parish offices.

The church grounds lie at the intersection of three townships and two counties. The old church building, along with a small portion of the graveyard, is located in Newtown Township, Delaware County; the chapel and offices are located in Radnor Township, Delaware County; and most of the graveyard is in Easttown Township, Chester County.

== Longfellow poem ==
The poet Henry Wadsworth Longfellow visited St. David's during the Centennial celebrations in Philadelphia, 1876, as the guest of George Childs who lived nearby. Longfellow and his family ended up spending much of the summer that year with Childs and his family. In 1880, Longfellow composed the poem which was among his last works. Struck by the peace and quiet of "this little church among its graves", he composed a poem about it: "Old St. David's at Radnor", which was published later that same year in the collection Ultima Thule. The poem refers to another poet, Welshman George Herbert, and the small Bemerton church of which he was rector.

== Historic Structures ==
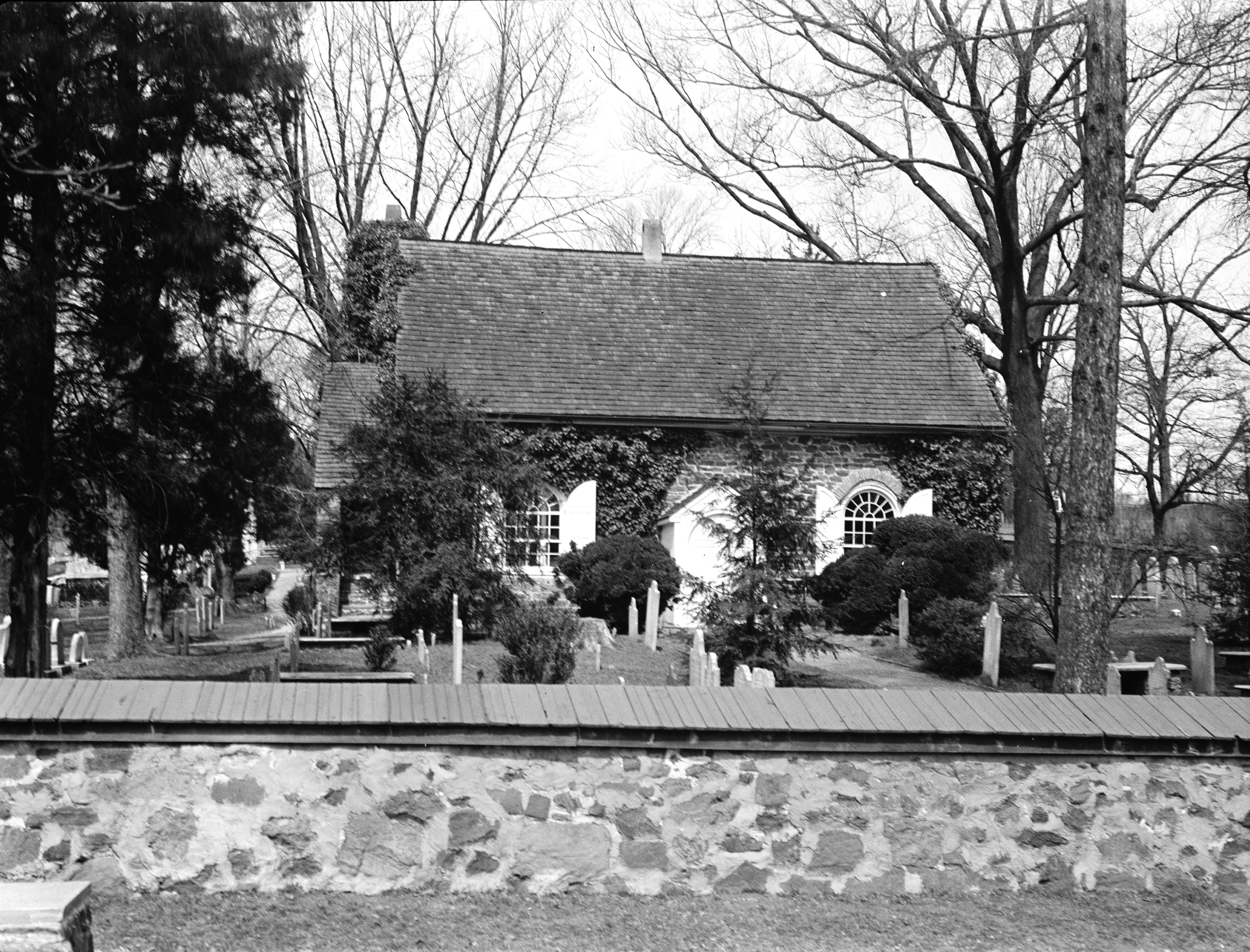
St. David's in 1925; photo from the Historic American Buildings Survey

The "old" church building, constructed 1715, was added to or modified a number of times, in 1767, 1771, 1786, 1813, 1830, and 1907. These modifications included the relocation of the altar, the addition of an enclosed stair to the choir loft, the addition of a vestry room to the north, and the construction of an enclosure for the main entry door. A horse shed was built in 1850, and added to in 1871. The horse shed has since been demolished.

These structures were recorded in the Historic American Buildings Survey. Numerous photographs were also taken.

== Graveyard ==
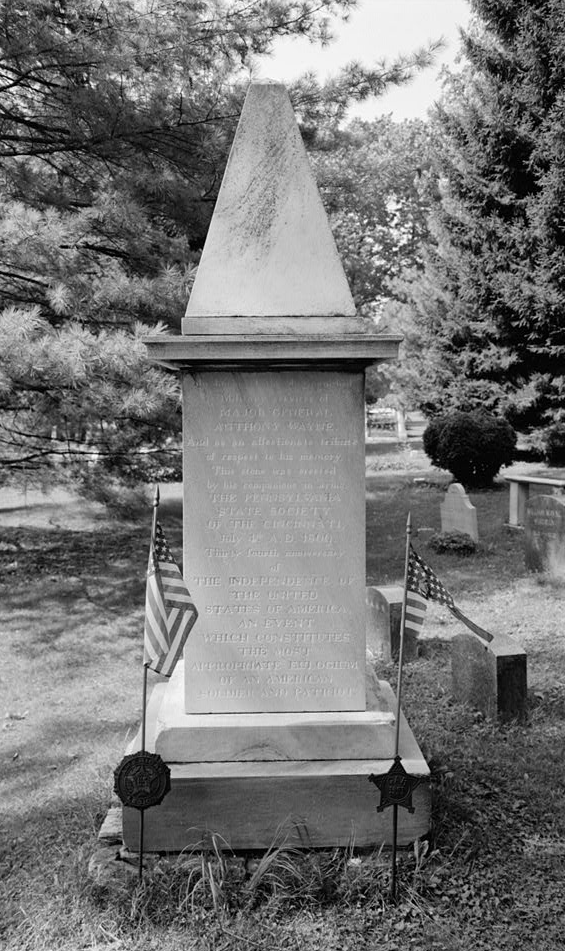
The memorial from the Pennsylvania State Society of the Cincinnati marks the grave containing the bones of Anthony Wayne.

Notable burials at St. David's include:

- William W. Atterbury (1866–1935), Brigadier General in World War I, and President of the Pennsylvania Railroad 1925–35
- Rose Bampton (1907–2007), opera singer
- Wilfrid Pelletier (1896-1982), Canadian conductor and pianist. Husband of Rose Bampton
- George W. Pepper (1867–1961), U.S. Senator 1922–27
- V. Gilpin Robinson (1851–1942), Pennsylvania State Representative for Delaware County, 1911–13
- Helen Hope Montgomery Scott (1904–1995), Socialite and philanthropist
- Edward Lowber Stokes (1880–1964), US Congressman
- Walter Stuempfig (1914-1970), American artist
- Anthony Wayne (1745–1796), Continental Army Brigadier general during the American Revolution
- Isaac Wayne (1699–1774), member of the Pennsylvania Provincial Assembly
- Isaac Wayne (1772–1852) U.S. Representative from Pennsylvania, 1823–25
- R. Norris Williams (1891–1968), professional tennis player and Olympic athlete

The grave of American Revolutionary War General Anthony Wayne at St. David's is one of his two graves. He died during a return trip to Pennsylvania from a military post in Detroit. He was initially buried at Fort Presque Isle, Pennsylvania. His son, Isaac Wayne, disinterred the body in 1809 and had the corpse boiled to remove the flesh from the bones. The remaining flesh was reburied at Fort Presque Isle and the bones were placed into two saddlebags and relocated to the family plot in the St. David's graveyard. On June 5, 1811, The Pennsylvania State Society of the Cincinnati placed a monument in the cemetery to the memory of Anthony Wayne over the grave containing his bones.

== Rectors ==
The missionaries (to 1714) and rectors (thereafter) of St. David's, with their years of service:

- Evan Evans, D.D., 1700–1704
- John Clubb, ca. 1707–c. 1712, 1714–1715
- Evan Evans, D.D., 1716–1718
- John Humphreys, 1718–1719
- Robert Weyman, 1719–1730
- Richard Backhouse, 1730–1732
- Griffith Hughes, 1732–1736
- William Currie 1737–1776 (officially), 1776–1785 (unofficially)
- Slator Clay, 1786–1821
- Samuel Crawford Brinckle, 1818–1832
- Simon Wilmer, 1832–1833
- William Henry Rees, D.D., 1833–1838
- Willie Peck, 1838–1845
- Breed Batcheller, 1845–1847
- Thomas Greene Allen, 1847–1848
- John Albemarle Childs, D.D., 1848–1850
- Henry Brown, 1851–1855
- Richardson Graham, 1856–1861
- Thomas Green Clemson, Jr., 1861–1866
- William Frederick Halsey, 1866–1882
- George Alexander Keller, 1882–1902
- James Hart Lamb, D.D., 1902–1918
- William Cunningham Rodgers, D.D., 1919–1922
- Crosswell McBee, D.D., 1922–1945
- John Cecil Knewstub, 1945–1966
- Richard Walton Hess, 1967–1983
- Stephen Kent Jacobson, D.Min., 1984–1996
- W. Frank Allen, 1997–2023
- Devon Anderson (interim), 2024-2024
- Rick Morley, 2024-
