= Francis J. Myers =

American politician (1901–1956)

Francis Myers
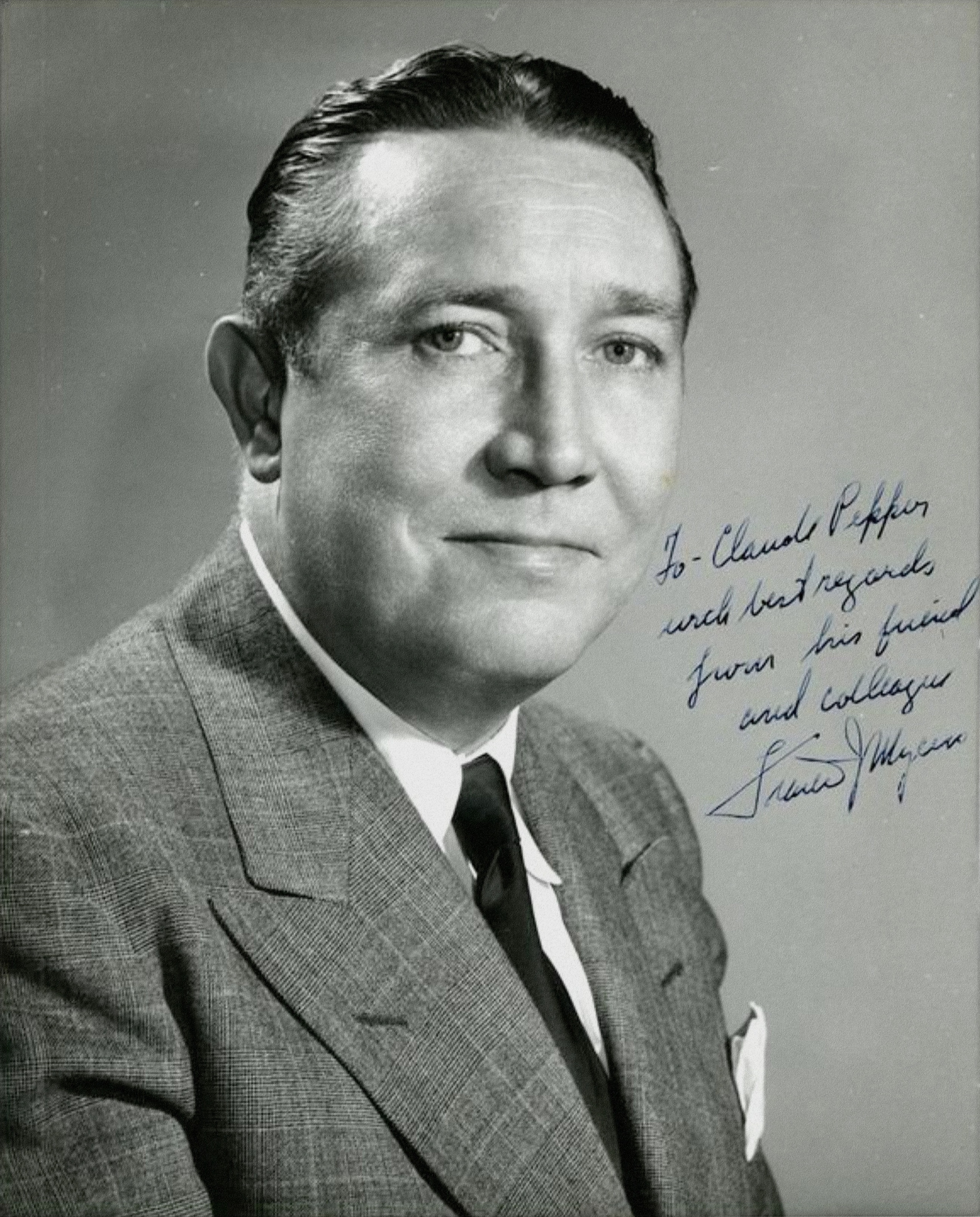
- Myers c. 1949

Senate Majority Whip
- In office January 3, 1949 – January 3, 1951
- Leader: Scott W. Lucas
- Preceded by: Kenneth S. Wherry
- Succeeded by: Lyndon B. Johnson

United States Senator from Pennsylvania
- In office January 3, 1945 – January 3, 1951
- Preceded by: James J. Davis
- Succeeded by: James H. Duff

Member of the U.S. House of Representatives from Pennsylvania's 6th district
- In office January 3, 1939 – January 3, 1945
- Preceded by: Michael J. Stack
- Succeeded by: Herbert J. McGlinchey

Personal details
- Born: Francis John Myers; December 18, 1901 Philadelphia, Pennsylvania, U.S.
- Died: July 5, 1956 (aged 54) Philadelphia, Pennsylvania, U.S.
- Resting place: Holy Sepulchre Cemetery, Cheltenham Township, Pennsylvania, U.S.
- Party: Democratic
- Education: Saint Joseph's University (BA); Temple University (LLB)

Francis John Myers (December 18, 1901 – July 5, 1956) was an American teacher, lawyer, and Democratic Party politician. He represented most of West Philadelphia and Southwest Philadelphia in the United States House of Representatives from 1939 to 1945 and represented Pennsylvania in the United States Senate for one term from 1945 to 1951. He was Senate Majority Whip from 1949 to 1951.

== Early life and education ==
Francis Myers was born in Philadelphia, Pennsylvania, to John Francis and Mary (née Donnelly) Myers, who were the children of Irish immigrants. His father was a post office employee in Philadelphia for forty years, holding the position of chief auditor upon his retirement. He received his early education at George L. Brooks Elementary School in West Philadelphia, and graduated from St. Joseph's Preparatory School in 1919. He then attended St. Joseph's University, where he received a Bachelor of Arts degree in 1923. During college, he was a member of the baseball, football, and debating teams.

== Early career ==
From 1923 to 1927, Myers served as an instructor in Latin, English, and ancient history at St. Joseph's Preparatory School. In addition to his teaching duties, he studied law in the evenings at Temple University Law School. He was admitted to the bar in 1927, and then entered private practice. From 1929 to 1931, he worked as a secretary with the Philadelphia law firm of Monaghan and Phillips. The head of the firm, John Monaghan, was also the district attorney of the city.

Myers was an attorney for the Home Owners' Loan Corporation from 1934 to 1935. He became active in Democratic politics, and was a member of the successful campaign of George Earle for Governor of Pennsylvania. In 1937, he was appointed deputy attorney general of Pennsylvania, serving in that position for only a year.

== Political career ==
=== U.S. House of Representatives ===
In 1938, Myers was elected to the U.S. House of Representatives from Pennsylvania's 6th congressional district. He defeated incumbent Michael Stack, who largely opposed the New Deal, in the Democratic primary. He received just below 50% of the vote in the general election, defeating Republican J. Howard Berry and Congressman Stack, who ran on the Royal Oak ticket. He was re-elected over Republican city solicitor Frank Truscott in 1940, winning by a margin of 61%-38%. In 1942, he won a third term after defeating Republican businessman William Sylk by a ten percentage point margin.

=== U.S. Senate ===
In 1944, Myers was elected to the U.S. Senate after narrowly defeating Republican incumbent James Davis by 50%-49%. He was the first Catholic to serve as Senator from Pennsylvania. At the 1948 Democratic National Convention in Philadelphia, Myers served as chairman of the platform committee; in that position, he helped draft a party platform that strongly supported civil rights. He was Senate Majority Whip from 1949 to 1951, serving under Majority Leader Scott Lucas.

He lost his bid for a second term in 1950, losing to Governor Jim Duff by 51%-48%. His defeat came after being linked to President Harry S. Truman's unpopular administration.

== Later life and death ==
Following his Senate career, Myers resumed the practice of law. He also served as chairman of the Philadelphia Redevelopment Authority, and as a member of the General State Authority and the Greater Philadelphia Movement.

Myers died of leukemia at Graduate Hospital on July 5th, 1956, at age 54. He is buried in Holy Sepulchre Cemetery in Cheltenham Township, Pennsylvania.

U.S. House of Representatives
Preceded by Michael J. Stack	Member of the U.S. House of Representatives from Pennsylvania's 6th congressional district 1939–1945	Succeeded by Herbert J. McGlinchey
Party political offices
Preceded by George Earle	Democratic nominee for U.S. Senator from Pennsylvania (Class 3); 1944, 1950	Succeeded by Joe Clark
Preceded by Scott W. Lucas	Senate Democratic Whip; 1949–1951	Succeeded by Lyndon Johnson
U.S. Senate
Preceded by James J. Davis	U.S. Senator (Class 3) from Pennsylvania; 1945–1951; Served alongside: Joe Guffey, Ed Martin	Succeeded by James H. Duff
