= V. Gilpin Robinson =

American politician (1851-1942)

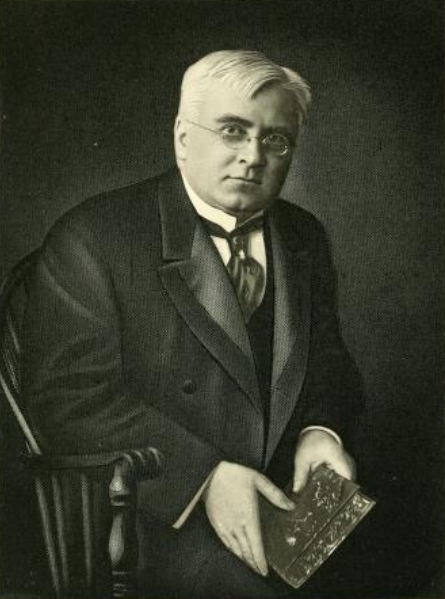
- Robinson in a 1914 publication

Member of the Pennsylvania House of Representatives from the Delaware County district
- In office 1911–1913
- Preceded by: William Ward Jr.
- Succeeded by: William T. Ramsey

Personal details
- Born: Vincent Gilpin Robinson; August 21, 1851 Wilmington, Delaware, U.S.
- Died: March 27, 1942 Clifton Heights, Pennsylvania, U.S.
- Resting place: St. David's Episcopal Church, Wayne, Pennsylvania, U.S.
- Party: Republican
- Spouse(s): Sallie M. Baker (m. 1874; died 1883) A. May (m. 1894; died 1902) Mary A. Kent (m. 1908)
- Occupation: Politician; lawyer

V. Gilpin Robinson (August 21, 1851 - March 27, 1942) was an American lawyer and politician from Pennsylvania who served as a Republican member of the Pennsylvania House of Representatives for Delaware County from 1911 to 1913.

== Early life and education ==
Vincent Gilpin Robinson was born in Wilmington, Delaware, to Jacob F. and Rebecca (Little) Robinson. The family moved to Chester, Pennsylvania, when Robinson was 15.

== Career ==
Robinson served as a clerk in the office of Orson Flagg Bullard, the Prothonotary of Delaware County. He resigned his clerkship to study to be a lawyer and was admitted to the bar in 1872

He served as District Attorney for Delaware County from 1876 to 1880.

In 1879, Robinson was commissioned major and judge advocate for the Pennsylvania National Guard and served until 1895 when he resigned as aide-de-camp with the rank of captain on the staff of Brigadier General John W. Schall commanding the First Brigade.

In 1883, Robinson formed, along with Horace Plankinton Green, the law firm of Robinson & Green. The partnership continued until 1892 when each opened a separate office. In 1894, Robinson joined the practice of Rich, Robinson & Boyer of Philadelphia until the firm dissolved in 1895. Robinson maintained a solo practice from that time forward.

Robinson was elected to the Pennsylvania House of Representatives representing Delaware County for the 1911 term. He served on the committees on judiciary general, judiciary local, military pensions and gratuities, public health and sanitation, and railroads. He had an unsuccessful run for reelection for the 1913 term.

Robinson was Vice President of the Rittenhouse Trust Company and also served as director and one of the incorporators of the Media Title and Trust Company.

== Personal life ==
In 1874, Robinson married Sallie M. Baker, daughter of J. Mitchell Baker and sister of Jesse Matlack Baker. She died in 1883. In 1894, he married A. May who died in 1902. In 1908, Robinson married Mary A. Kent.

Robinson was a thirty-second degree Mason. He was a member of the Protestant Episcopal Church and served a vestryman of Christ Church in Media as well as St. James Church in Philadelphia.

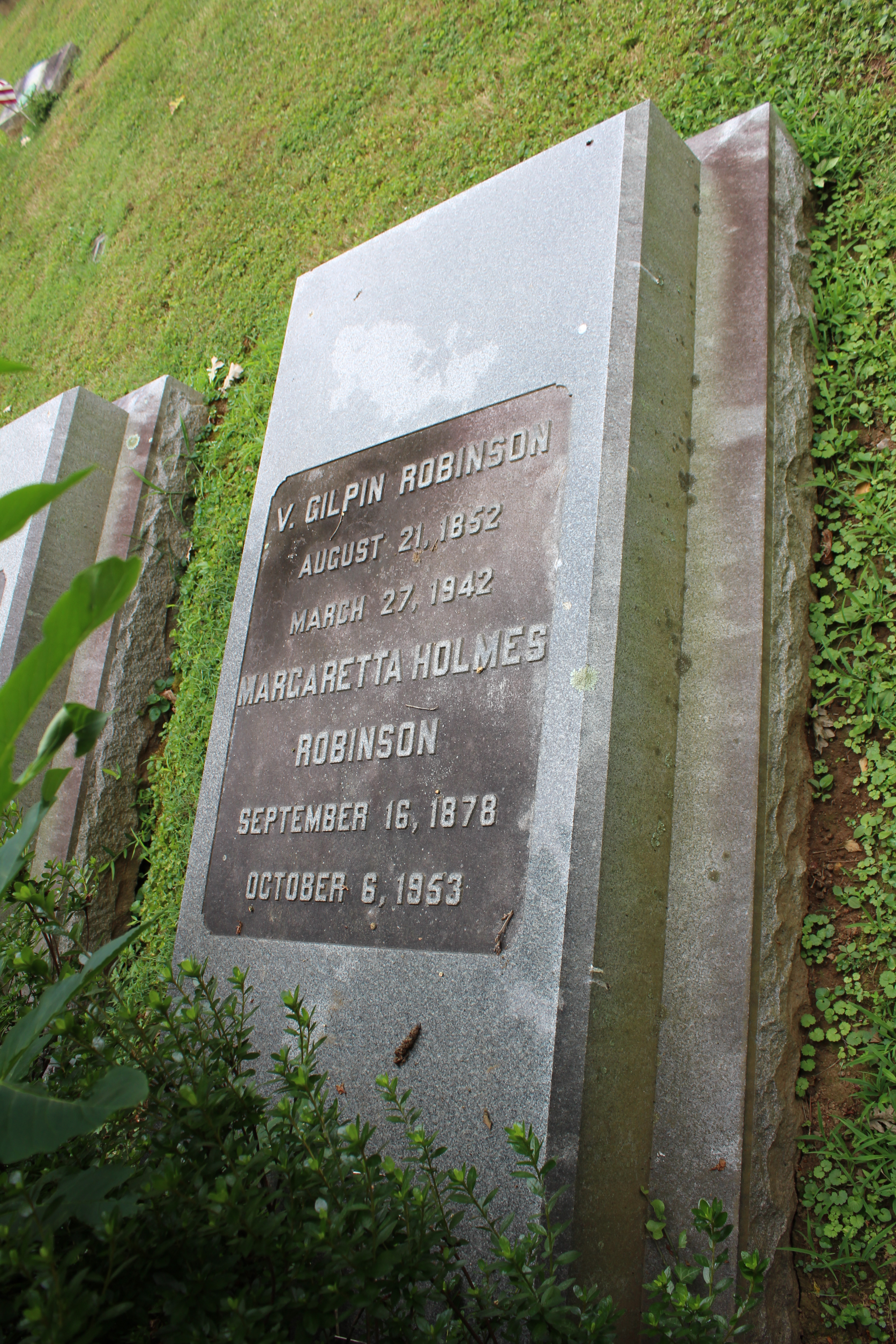
V. Gilpin Robinson Tombstone in St. David's Episcopal Church Cemetery

Robinson is interred at the St. David's Episcopal Church Cemetery in Wayne, Pennsylvania.

Pennsylvania House of Representatives
| Preceded by William Ward Jr. | Member of the Pennsylvania House of Representatives, Delaware County; 1911–1913 | Succeeded by William T. Ramsey |
