= Willa Blake Eslick =

American politician (1878–1961)

Willa McCord Blake Eslick
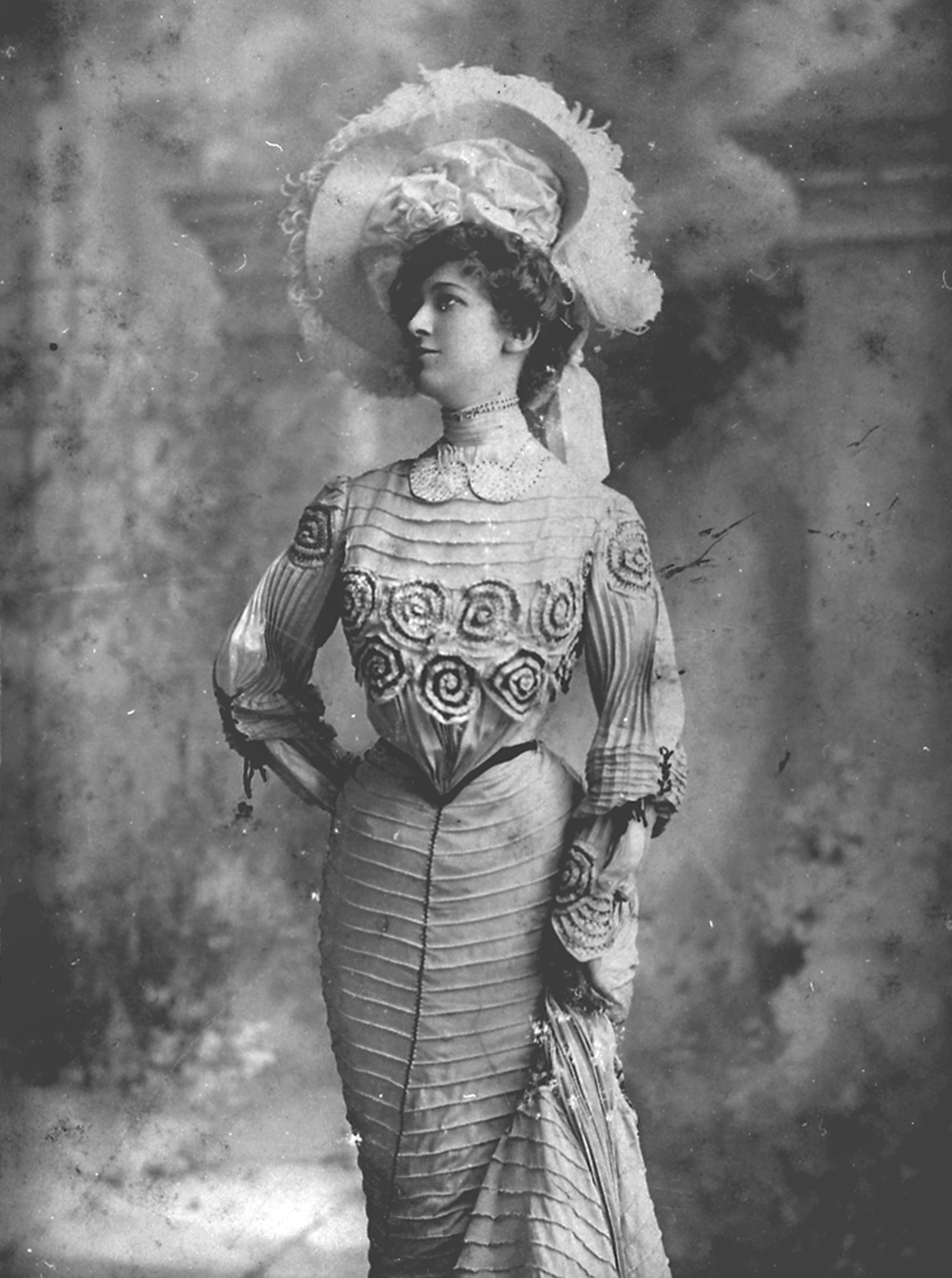

Member of the U.S. House of Representatives from Tennessee's 7th district
- In office August 13, 1932 – March 3, 1933
- Preceded by: Edward E. Eslick
- Succeeded by: Gordon Browning

Personal details
- Born: Willa McCord Blake; September 8, 1878 Fayetteville, Tennessee
- Died: February 18, 1961 (aged 82) Pulaski, Tennessee
- Party: Democratic
- Spouse: Edward E. Eslick
- Education: Dick White College; Milton College

Willa Eslick (née McCord Blake; September 8, 1878 – February 18, 1961) was a U.S. representative from Tennessee, wife of Edward Everett Eslick and the first woman to represent Tennessee in the United States Congress.

== Biography ==
Born in Fayetteville, Tennessee, Eslick was the daughter of George Washington and Eliza McCord Blake. She attended private schools, including Dick White College and Milton College in Fayetteville, Tennessee, as well as Winthrop Model School and Peabody College in Nashville, Tennessee. She also attended the Metropolitan College of Music and Synthetic School of Music in New York City. She served as a member of the Tennessee state Democratic committee, and was the first woman elected to Congress from Tennessee. She married Edward Everett Eslick on June 6, 1906.

== Career ==
Eslick was elected as a Democrat to the Seventy-second Congress to fill the vacancy caused by the death in office of her husband, Representative Edward Eslick. Eslick served as a Representative from August 14, 1932, until March 3, 1933. She was not eligible for reelection to the Seventy-third Congress, not having qualified for nomination as required by state law.

== Death ==
Eslick died on February 18, 1961, in Pulaski, Tennessee, at age 82 years, 163 days. She is interred at Maplewood Cemetery. She was a member of the American Association of University Women, the Daughters of the American Revolution, the United Daughters of the Confederacy, and the Order of the Eastern Star.

== See also ==
- Women in the United States House of Representatives

U.S. House of Representatives
Preceded by Edward E. Eslick	Member of the U.S. House of Representatives from Tennessee's 7th congressional district 1932-1933	Succeeded by Gordon Browning
