= Edward L. Stokes =

American politician

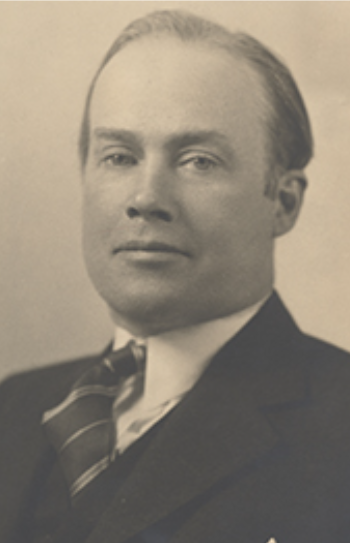

Member of the U.S. House of Representatives from Pennsylvania
- In office November 3, 1931 – January 3, 1935
- Preceded by: George S. Graham (2nd); Robert L. Davis (6th)
- Succeeded by: Michael J. Stack (2nd); James M. Beck (6th)
- Constituency: 2nd district (1931-33); 6th district (1933-35)

Personal details
- Born: September 29, 1880 Philadelphia, Pennsylvania, U.S.
- Died: November 8, 1964 (aged 84) Willistown Township, Pennsylvania, U.S.
- Resting place: St. David's Episcopal Church, Radnor, Pennsylvania
- Party: Republican

Edward Lowber Stokes (September 29, 1880 – November 8, 1964) was an American politician from Philadelphia who served as a Republican member of the U.S. House of Representatives for Pennsylvania's 2nd congressional district from 1931 to 1933 and Pennsylvania's 6th congressional district from 1933 to 1935.

== Early life and education ==
Stokes was born on September 29, 1880, in Philadelphia, Pennsylvania. He graduated from St. Paul's School in Concord, New Hampshire. He was an international polo player and was captain of the Philadelphia Country Club polo team. Stokes served as a vestryman for Christ Church in Philadelphia from 1913 to 1940.

== Career ==
He was employed as a clerk for a trust company and later engaged as an investment dealer. He founded the company Edward Stokes & Co. He was an unsuccessful candidate for election to the Pennsylvania House of Representatives in 1930.

Stokes was elected as a Republican to the 72nd Congress in 1931 to fill the vacancy caused by the death of George S. Graham and served until 1935. He was not a candidate for renomination because he was a gubernatorial candidate in 1934. He was again a candidate for Congress in 1950, and a candidate for mayor and councilman at large in 1952. He remained engaged in investment banking until his retirement in 1955.

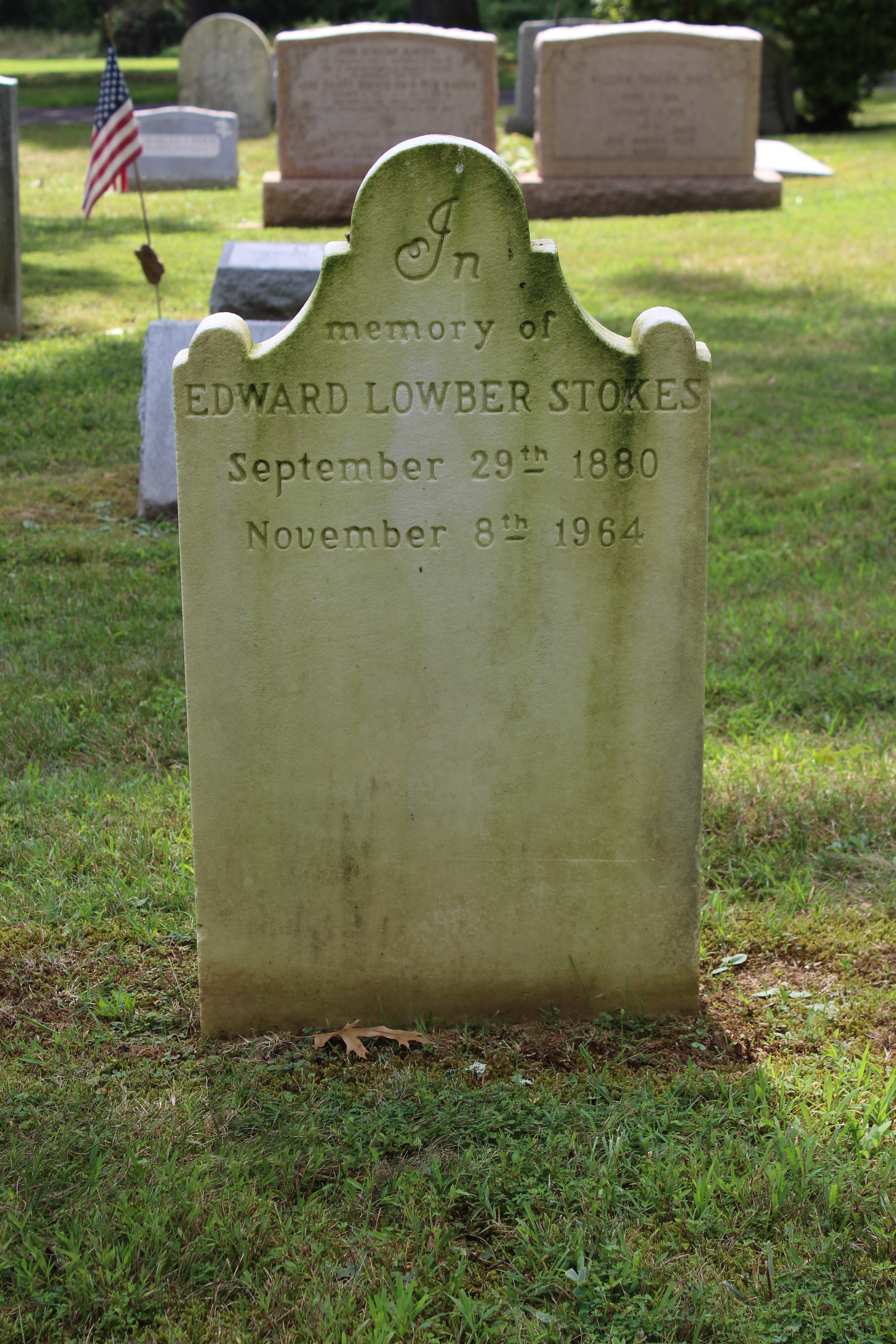
Edward L. Stokes tombstone in St. David's Episcopal Church graveyard

He died in Willistown Township, Pennsylvania on November 8, 1964, and was interred at St. David's Episcopal Church in Radnor, Pennsylvania.

U.S. House of Representatives
Preceded by George S. Graham	Member of the U.S. House of Representatives from Pennsylvania's 2nd congressional district 1931–1933	Succeeded by James M. Beck
Preceded by Robert L. Davis	Member of the U.S. House of Representatives from Pennsylvania's 6th congressional district 1933–1935	Succeeded by Michael J. Stack
