= William C. Salmon =

American politician (1868–1925)

William Charles Salmon
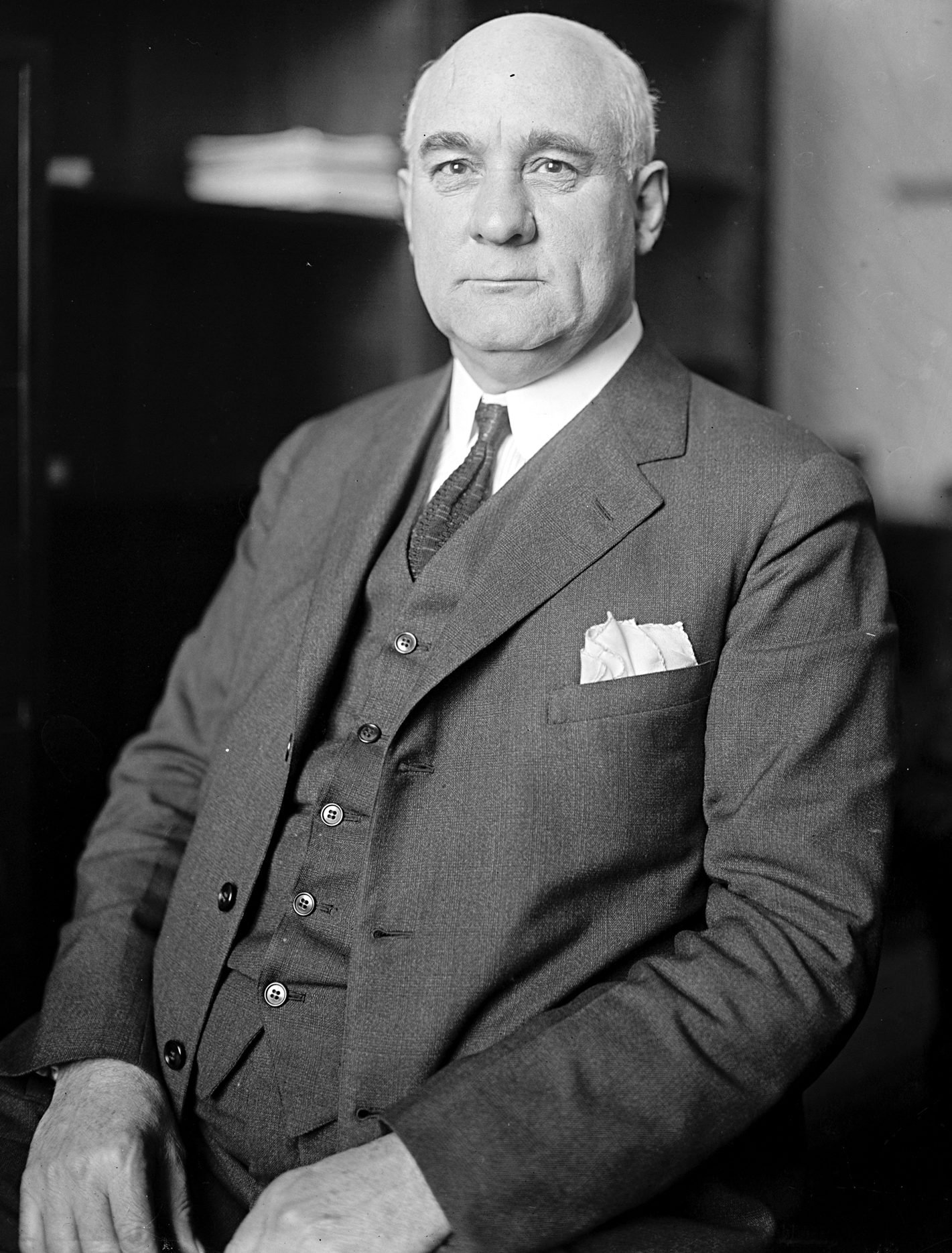

Member of the U.S. House of Representatives from Tennessee's 7th district
- In office March 4, 1923 – March 3, 1925
- Preceded by: Clarence W. Turner
- Succeeded by: Edward E. Eslick

Personal details
- Born: April 3, 1868 Henry County, Tennessee, U.S.
- Died: May 13, 1925 (aged 57) Washington, D.C., U.S.
- Party: Democratic
- Education: Valparaiso University Cumberland University
- Profession: Attorney; politician; teacher; farmer; judge

Military service
- Allegiance: United States of America
- Branch/service: United States Army
- Battles/wars: World War I

William Charles Salmon (April 3, 1868 – May 13, 1925) was an American politician and a member of the United States House of Representatives for the 7th congressional district of Tennessee.

== Biography ==
Born on April 3, 1868, near Paris, Tennessee in Henry County, Salmon attended the public schools, Edgewood Normal School, and Valparaiso University at Valparaiso, Indiana. He graduated in law from Cumberland University at Lebanon, Tennessee in 1897. He was admitted to the bar the same year, and he commenced practice in Columbia, Tennessee in Maury County.

== Career ==
Salmon taught in public and private schools for six years and also engaged in agricultural pursuits. He served as special circuit judge of the eleventh judicial circuit of Tennessee in 1908. He was president of the Columbia Board of Education from 1908 to 1922. He commanded an Artillery battery during World War I.

Elected as a Democrat to the Sixty-eighth Congress, serving from March 4, 1923, to March 3, 1925.

== Death ==
Salmon died on May 13, 1925 (age 57 years, 40 days) in Washington, D.C., and is interred at Rose Hill Cemetery in Columbia, Tennessee.

U.S. House of Representatives
Preceded by Clarence W. Turner	Member of the U.S. House of Representatives from Tennessee's 7th congressional district 1923-1925	Succeeded by Edward E. Eslick
