= Clarence W. Turner =

American politician (1866–1939)

Clarence Wyly Turner
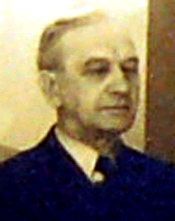

Member of the U.S. House of Representatives from Tennessee's 7th district
- In office November 7, 1922 – March 3, 1923
- Preceded by: Lemuel P. Padgett
- Succeeded by: William C. Salmon

Member of the U.S. House of Representatives from Tennessee's 6th district
- In office March 4, 1933 – March 23, 1939
- Preceded by: Jo Byrns
- Succeeded by: W. Wirt Courtney

Personal details
- Born: October 22, 1866 Humphreys County, Tennessee, U.S.
- Died: March 23, 1939 (aged 72) Washington, D.C., U.S.
- Citizenship: United States
- Party: Democratic
- Education: Northern Indiana Normal School
- Profession: Attorney; politician; editor; banker; judge

Clarence Wyly Turner (October 22, 1866 –March 23, 1939) was an American politician who served in the United States Congress as a member of the United States House of Representatives from Tennessee.

== Biography ==
Turner was born on October 22, 1866, on a farm near Clydeton, in Humphreys County, Tennessee, the son of Charles N. and Hettie B. Turner. He attended the public schools, a preparatory school in Edgewood in Dickson County, Tennessee, and National Normal Institute in Lebanon, Ohio. He graduated from the law department of Northern Indiana Normal School at Valparaiso, Indiana, in 1904. He was admitted to the bar the same year and commenced practice at Waverly, Tennessee, in Humphreys County. He was also the editor of the Waverly Sentinel.

== Career ==
The chairman of the Democratic committee of Humphreys County for fifteen years, Turner was also a member of the Tennessee Senate in 1900, 1901, and from 1909 to 1912. He was a delegate to the Democratic National Committee in 1920. He was elected mayor of Waverly, Tennessee in 1920, and also worked as a city attorney.

Elected as a Democrat to Sixty-seventh Congress by the Tennessee's 7th congressional district to fill the vacancy caused by the death of Lemuel P. Padgett, Turner served from November 7, 1922, to March 3, 1923. He was not a candidate in 1922 for re-election to the Sixty-eighth Congress.

Turner returned to Waverly, Tennessee and engaged in banking and agricultural pursuits. He served as the county judge of Humphreys County from 1924 to 1933. He was elected to the Seventy-third and to the three succeeding Congresses by Tennessee's 6th congressional district. He served from March 4, 1933, until his death in Washington, D.C., on March 23, 1939.

== Death ==
After his death in Washington, D.C., on March 23, 1939, Turner's remains were transported and he is interred in Marable Cemetery in Waverly, Tennessee.

== See also ==
- List of members of the United States Congress who died in office (1900–1949)

U.S. House of Representatives
Preceded by Lemuel P. Padgett	Member of the U.S. House of Representatives from Tennessee's 6th congressional district November 7, 1922 – March 3, 1923	Succeeded by William C. Salmon
Preceded by Jo Byrns	Member of the U.S. House of Representatives from Tennessee's 6th congressional district March 4, 1933 – March 23, 1939	Succeeded by W. Wirt Courtney
