= Robert Lee Davis =

American politician

Robert L. Davis

Member of the U.S. House of Representatives from Pennsylvania's 6th district
- In office November 8, 1932 – March 3, 1933
- Preceded by: George Austin Welsh
- Succeeded by: Edward L. Stokes

Personal details
- Born: October 29, 1893 Philadelphia, Pennsylvania
- Died: May 5, 1967 (aged 73) Timonium, Maryland
- Party: Republican
- Education: Brown University

Robert Lee Davis (October 29, 1893 – May 5, 1967) was a Republican member of the U.S. House of Representatives from Pennsylvania.

== Biography ==
Robert L. Davis was born in Philadelphia, Pennsylvania. He graduated from Brown University in Providence, Rhode Island. He worked for the Pennsylvania Railroad from 1910 to 1932. During the First World War he served in the United States Navy. After the war, he served as assistant executive director of the Republican central campaign committee of Philadelphia from 1928 to 1932, and as director of the Republican city committee from 1932 to 1935.

Davis was elected as a Republican to the Seventy-second Congress to fill the vacancy caused by the resignation of United States Representative George A. Welsh. He was not a candidate for election in 1932. He worked as a businessman, real-estate broker, and commissioner of the Pinellas County Commission from 1962 to 1967. He died in Timonium, Maryland, and his remains were cremated.

== Sources ==
- United States Congress. "Robert L. Davis (id: D000129)". Biographical Directory of the United States Congress.
- The Political Graveyard

U.S. House of Representatives
Preceded by George A. Welsh	Member of the U.S. House of Representatives from Pennsylvania's 6th congressional district 1932–1933	Succeeded by Edward L. Stokes
