= George Austin Welsh =

American judge (1878–1970)

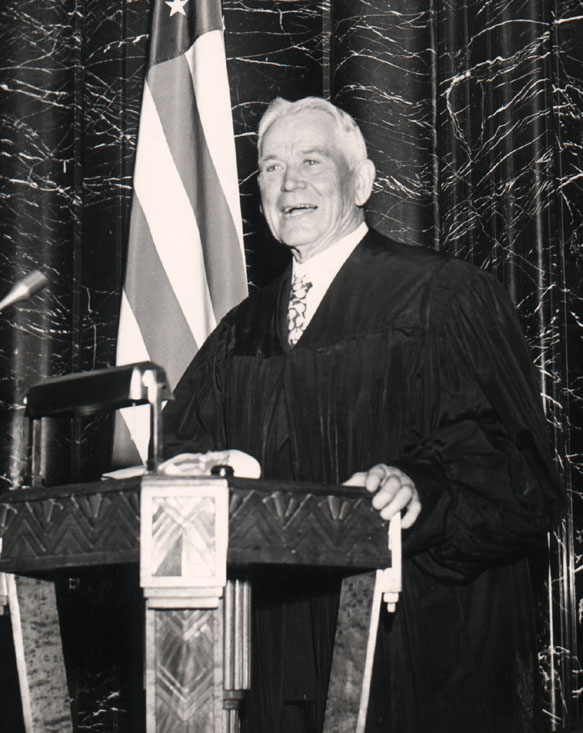

Senior Judge of the United States District Court for the Eastern District of Pennsylvania
- In office August 29, 1957 – October 22, 1970

Judge of the United States District Court for the Eastern District of Pennsylvania
- In office May 20, 1932 – August 29, 1957
- Appointed by: Herbert Hoover
- Preceded by: Joseph Whitaker Thompson
- Succeeded by: Thomas C. Egan

Member of the U.S. House of Representatives from Pennsylvania's 6th district
- In office March 4, 1923 – May 31, 1932
- Preceded by: George P. Darrow
- Succeeded by: Robert Lee Davis

Personal details
- Born: George Austin Welsh; August 9, 1878 Bay View, Maryland, US
- Died: October 22, 1970 (aged 92) Media, Pennsylvania, US
- Resting place: West Laurel Hill Cemetery; Bala Cynwyd, Pennsylvania
- Party: Republican
- Education: Temple University Beasley School of Law (LL.B.)

George Austin Welsh (August 9, 1878 – October 22, 1970) was a United States representative from Pennsylvania and a United States district judge of the United States District Court for the Eastern District of Pennsylvania.

== Education and career ==
Born on August 9, 1878, in Bay View, Maryland, Welsh attended the country schools and the public schools of Philadelphia, Pennsylvania. He took business and academic courses from Temple University and engaged as a legislative stenographer and reporter from 1895 to 1901. He received a Bachelor of Laws in 1905 from Philadelphia Law School of Temple College (now Temple University Beasley School of Law) and was admitted to the bar the same year. He entered private practice in Philadelphia, Pennsylvania from 1905 to 1923. He was Secretary to Mayor John Weaver of Philadelphia from 1905 to 1906. He was an assistant city solicitor for Philadelphia from 1906 to 1907. He was an assistant district attorney in Philadelphia from 1907 to 1922. He was Secretary of Temple University from 1914 to 1938, and began serving as its first Vice President in 1938. He was President of the Republican district executive committee from 1914 to 1932. He attended officers' training camp at Fort Niagara, New York in 1917. He was a member of the Board of Education of Philadelphia County, Pennsylvania from 1921 to 1932.

== Congressional service ==
Welsh was elected as a Republican to the United States House of Representatives of the 68th United States Congress and to the four succeeding Congresses and served from March 4, 1923, until his resignation May 31, 1932. He was Chairman of the Committee on Industrial Arts and Expositions for the 69th United States Congress.

== Federal judicial service ==
Welsh was nominated by President Herbert Hoover on April 14, 1932, to a seat on the United States District Court for the Eastern District of Pennsylvania vacated by Judge Joseph Whitaker Thompson. He was confirmed by the United States Senate on May 19, 1932, and received his commission on May 20, 1932. He assumed senior status on August 29, 1957. His service terminated on October 22, 1970, due to his death in Media, Pennsylvania, where he resided. He was cremated and his ashes interred in West Laurel Hill Cemetery in Bala Cynwyd, Pennsylvania.

== Personal life ==
Welsh married Nellie Ross Wolf of Bermuda in 1906. They had two sons, William Austin Welsh and James Conwell Welsh. In 1921, he married for the 2nd time Helen Reed Kirk and they had three children together, Margaret, Patrick and Deborah.

== Sources ==
- "George Austin Welsh". Biographical Directory of the United States Congress.

== Bibliography ==
- Brown, William Findlay; Welsh, George Austin (1910). Supplement to digest of laws and ordinances concerning Philadelphia, with notes of decisions and city solicitors' opinions relating there to, 1905-1910. Philadelphia: The Compiler.
- Congress, United States (1921). Official Congressional Directory. U.S. Government Printing Office.
- Committee, Judicial Conference of the United States Bicentennial (1978). Judges of the United States. The Committee. p. 548.
- Willy, Nethanel (2012). George Austin Welsh - United States House of Representatives. p. 80. ISBN 978-6200946584.

U.S. House of Representatives
Preceded by George P. Darrow	Member of the U.S. House of Representatives from Pennsylvania's 6th congressional district 1923–1932	Succeeded by Robert Lee Davis
Legal offices
Preceded by Joseph Whitaker Thompson	Judge of the United States District Court for the Eastern District of Pennsylvania; 1932–1957	Succeeded by Thomas C. Egan
