= Edward E. Eslick =

American politician (1872–1932)

Edward Everett Eslick
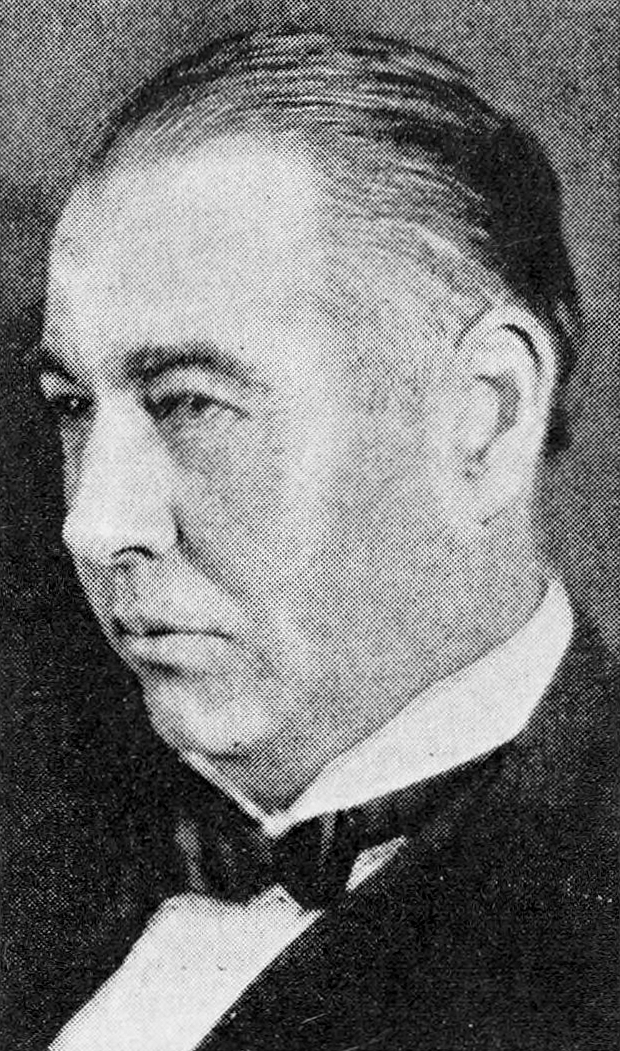
- Eslick c. 1932

Member of the U.S. House of Representatives from Tennessee's 7th district
- In office March 4, 1925 – June 14, 1932
- Preceded by: William C. Salmon
- Succeeded by: Willa Eslick

Personal details
- Born: April 19, 1872 Giles County, Tennessee, U.S.
- Died: June 14, 1932 (aged 60) Washington, D.C., U.S.
- Resting place: Maplewood Cemetery
- Party: Democratic
- Spouse: Willa McCord Blake (m. 1906)
- Education: Bethel College
- Profession: Attorney, politician, banker, farmer

Edward Everett Eslick (April 19, 1872 – June 14, 1932) was an American politician and a member of the United States House of Representatives for the 7th congressional district of Tennessee.

== Biography ==
Born near Pulaski, Tennessee in Giles County Eslick was the son of Merritt and Martha Virginia (Abernathy) Eslick. He attended public schools and Bethel College at Russellville, Kentucky. He studied law, was admitted to the bar in 1893, and commenced practice in Pulaski. He married Willa McCord Blake on June 6, 1906, in Birmingham, Alabama.

== Career ==
As well as practicing law, Eslick also engaged in banking and agricultural pursuits. He was an alternate delegate to Democratic National Convention from Tennessee in 1916. During World War I, he served as a government appeal agent for Giles County.

Eslick was elected as a Democrat to the Sixty-ninth. He was also elected to the three succeeding Congresses. He served from March 4, 1925, until his death.

== Death ==
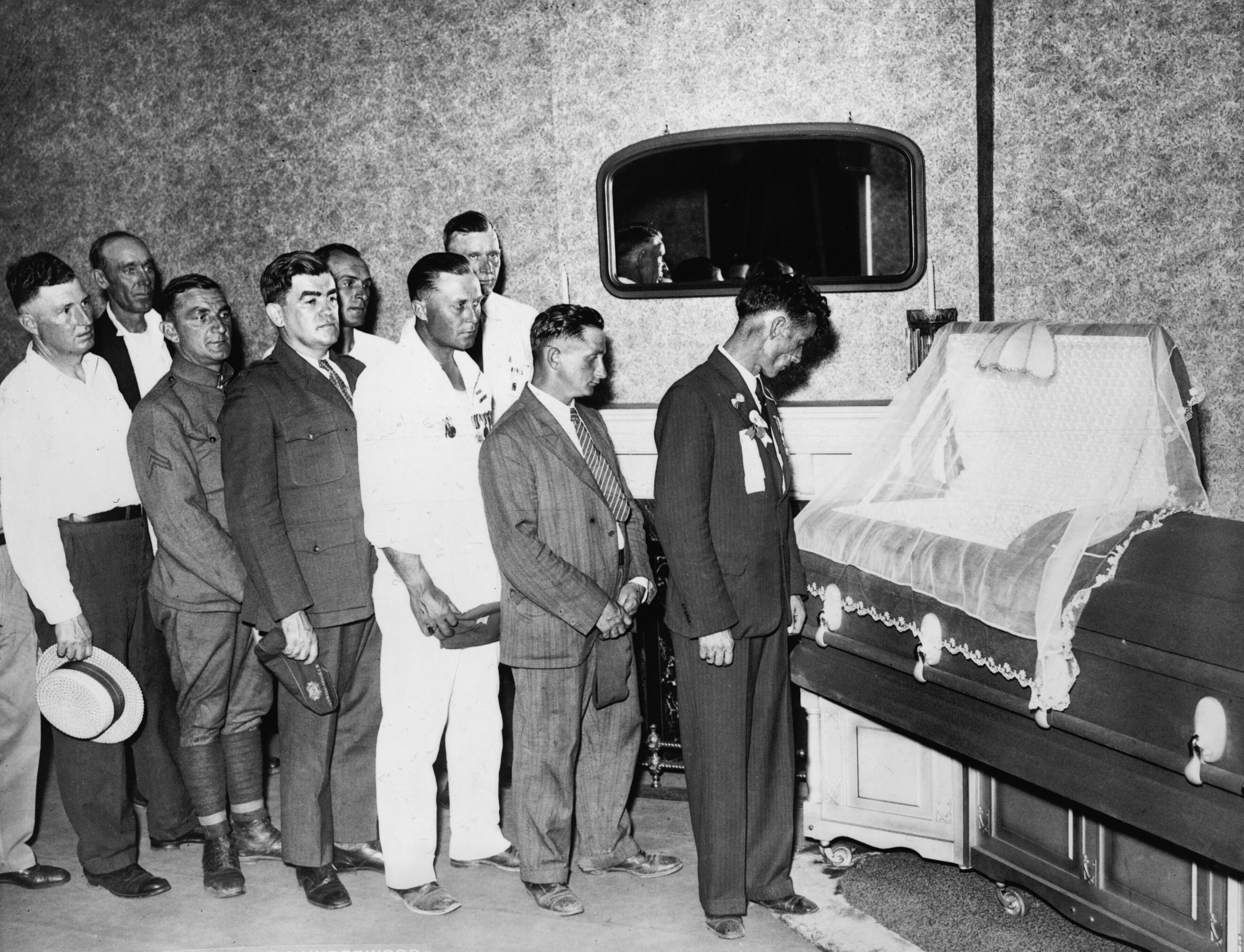
Members of the Bonus Army honor Eslick at his funeral, June 15, 1932

Eslick died on June 14, 1932, (age 60 years, 56 days) from a heart attack at the Capitol at Washington, D.C., on June 14, 1932, while addressing the House of Representatives in support of the Wright Patman World War I Bonus Bill which would have immediately given World War I veterans financial bonuses reserved for 1945. Eslick's remains were moved to Pulaski. He is interred at Maplewood Cemetery in Pulaski, Tennessee. His wife, Willa McCord Eslick, was elected to fill out the remainder of his term in Congress.

== See also ==
- List of members of the United States Congress who died in office (1900–1949)

U.S. House of Representatives
| Preceded by William C. Salmon | Member of the U.S. House of Representatives from Tennessee's 7th congressional district 1925-1932 | Succeeded by Willa Eslick |
