= Mae Nolan =

American politician (1886–1973)

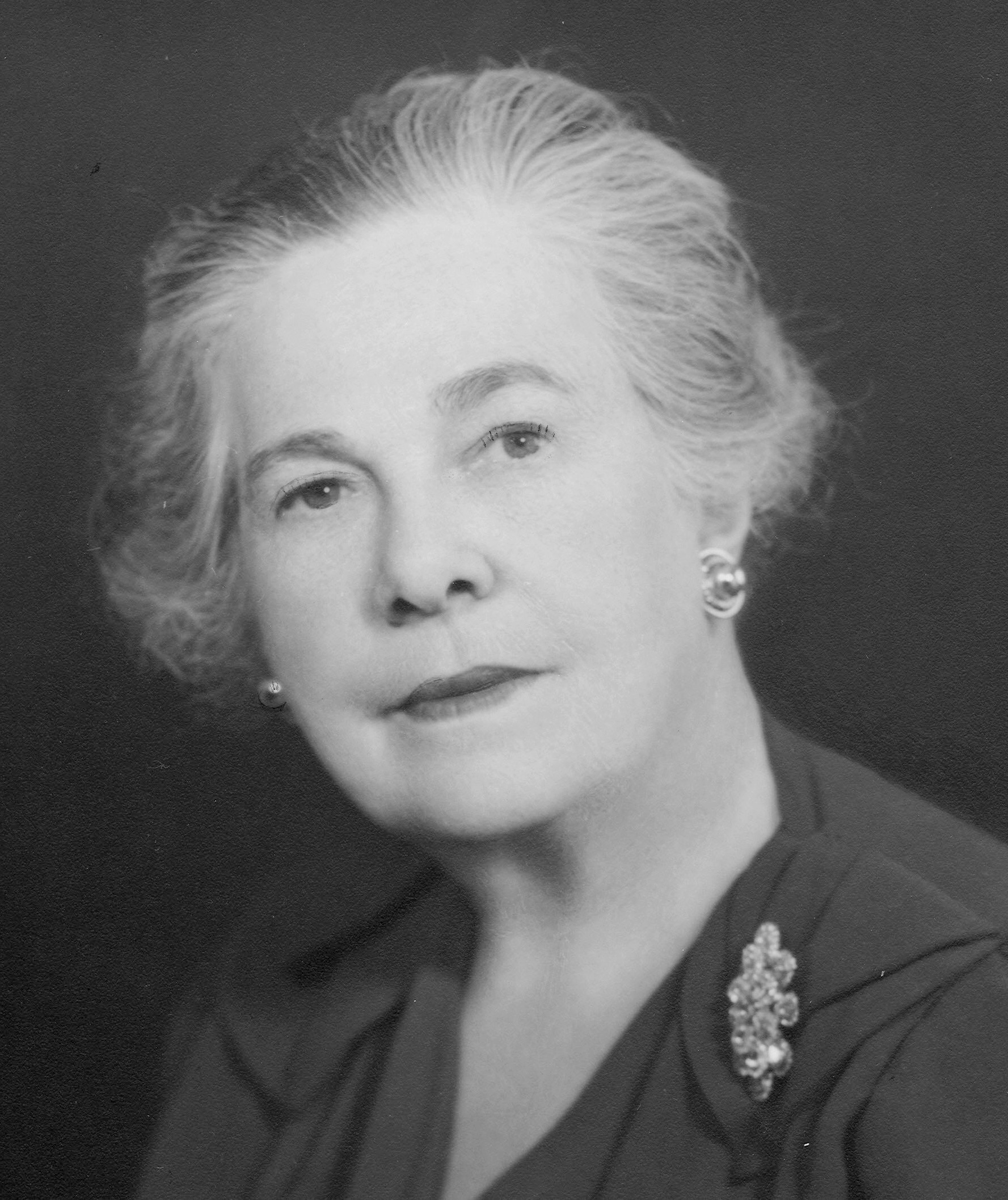

Member of the U.S. House of Representatives from California's 5th district
- In office January 23, 1923 – March 3, 1925
- Preceded by: John I. Nolan
- Succeeded by: Lawrence J. Flaherty

Personal details
- Born: Mae Ella Hunt; September 20, 1886 San Francisco, California, U.S.
- Died: July 9, 1973 (aged 86) Sacramento, California, U.S.
- Resting place: Holy Cross Cemetery
- Party: Republican
- Spouse: John I. Nolan (m. 1913; died 1922)
- Children: Corliss
- Education: Ayres Business College

Mae Ella Nolan (née Hunt; September 20, 1886 – July 9, 1973) was an American politician who became the fourth woman to serve in the United States Congress, the first woman elected to Congress from California, the first woman to chair a Congressional committee, and the first to fill the seat left vacant by her husband's death. She took her seat in the United States House of Representatives in 1923.

== Biography ==
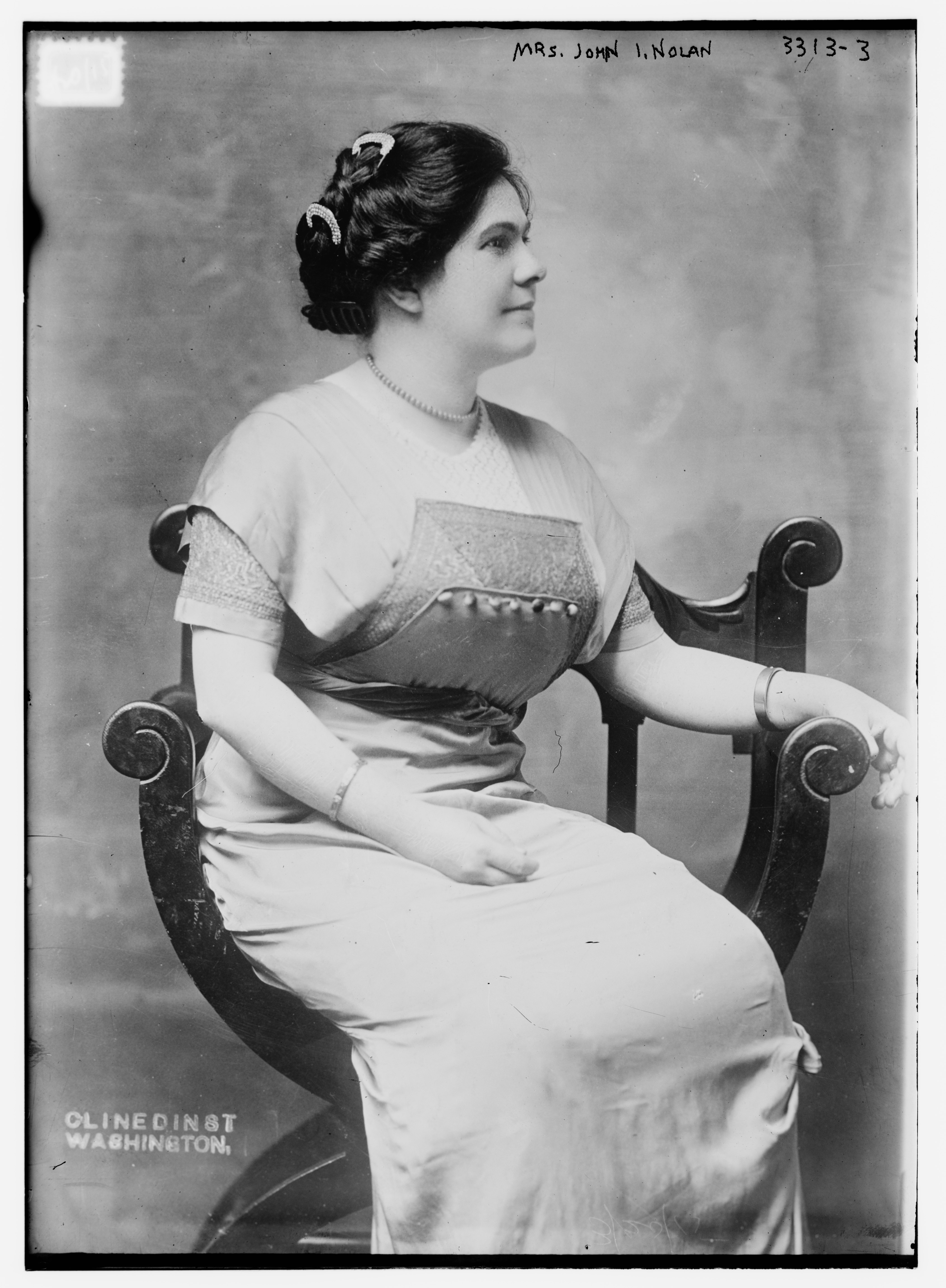
Nolan c. 1913–1915

Mae Ella Hunt was born in San Francisco, California on September 20, 1886. She attended public schools, St. Vincent's Convent, and Ayres Business College of San Francisco. She married Republican U.S. Representative John Ignatius Nolan in 1913.

=== Congress ===
Nolan's husband died on November 18, 1922, near the end of the 67th Congress; he had been re-elected to the 68th Congress, which would come into existence on March 4, 1923. Two special elections were held on January 23, 1923, to fill the vacancies in the 67th Congress about to end and the 68th Congress about to begin. Mae Nolan was elected to fill both vacancies, and served from January 23, 1923, to March 3, 1925.

Nolan was the fourth woman elected to Congress, after Jeannette Rankin, Alice Mary Robertson, and Winnifred Sprague Mason Huck. All four were elected as Republicans to the House of Representatives. Nolan was a Catholic, hence she was the first woman from such a background who served in the federal legislature.

Nolan was the first woman elected to her husband's seat in Congress, which is sometimes known as the "widow's succession." As of 2004, 36 widows have won their husbands' seats in the House, and 8 in the Senate.

Nolan supported her late husband's agenda on minimum wage, child labor laws, and education. She distanced herself from the women's suffrage movement by dropping her membership in the Woman Suffrage Committee, depending on support from labor, which was unsupportive. Her primary concerns were improving wages and lowering taxes on workers while raising them for wealthy Americans, She also supported a bonus for World War I veterans.

During her term, she was the chairman of the Committee on Expenditures in the Post Office Department. She was not a candidate for renomination in 1924 to the 69th Congress, saying that "Politics is entirely too masculine to have any attraction for feminine responsibilities".

=== Death and burial ===
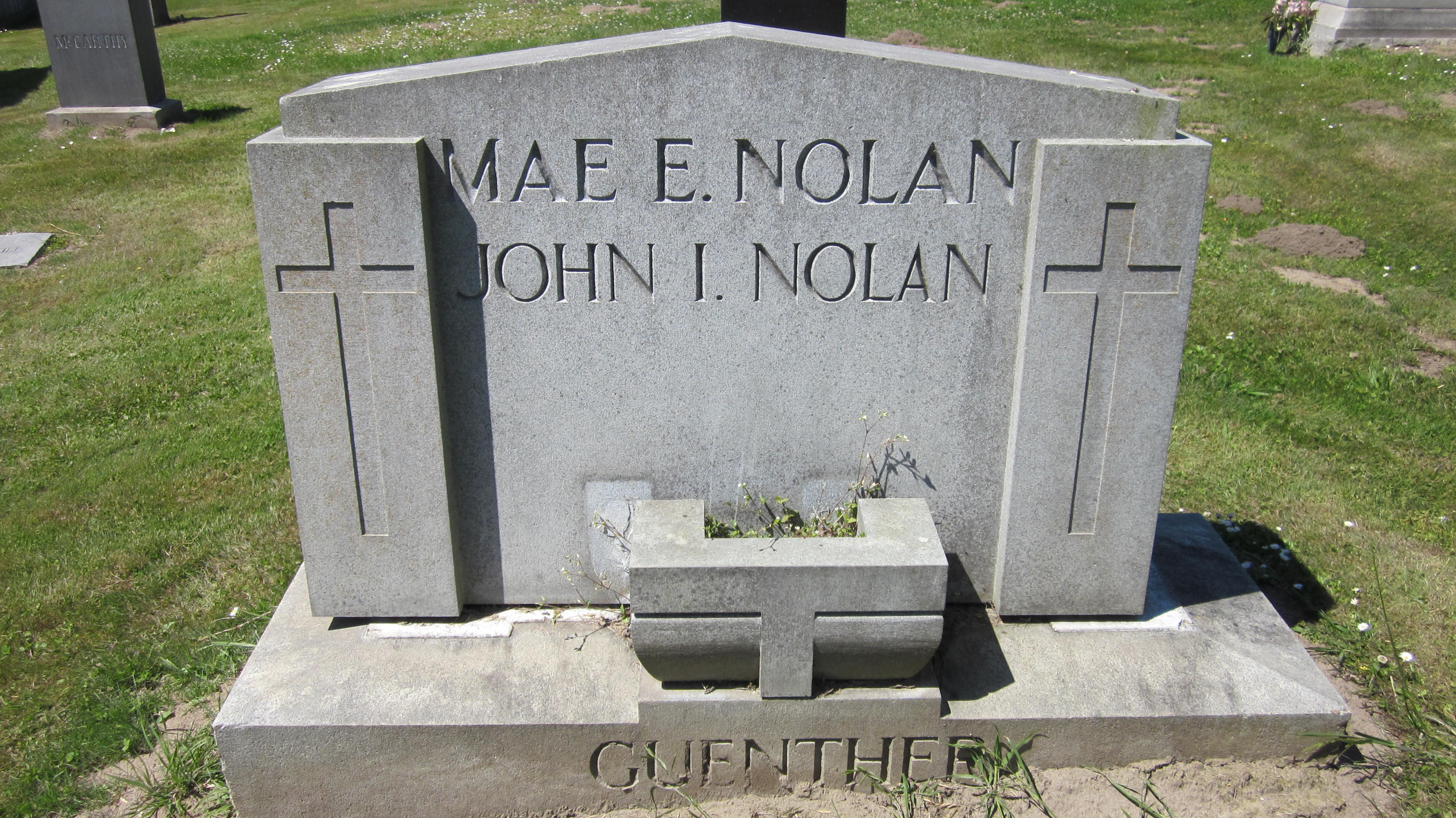
The Nolans' grave at Holy Cross Cemetery

In her later years, Nolan moved to Sacramento, California, where she died on July 9, 1973 at age 86. Her remains were interred at Holy Cross Cemetery in Colma, California along with her husband, whom she survived for more than 50 years.

== Electoral history ==
Republican Mae Nolan won the special election to replace her husband John I. Nolan, who won re-election but died before the 68th Congress convened. Data for this special election is not available.

1924 United States House of Representatives elections in California
Party	Candidate	Votes	%
Republican	Lawrence J. Flaherty	38,893	72.6
Socialist	Isabel C. King	12,175	27.4
Total votes		51,068	100.0
Turnout			
Republican hold			

== See also ==
- Women in the United States House of Representatives

U.S. House of Representatives
Preceded by John Nolan	Member of the U.S. House of Representatives from California's 5th congressional district 1923–1925	Succeeded by Lawrence Flaherty
Preceded by Frederick Zihlman	Chairperson of the Postal Expenditures Committee; 1923–1925	Succeeded by Phil Swing
