= 1920 United States presidential election in California =

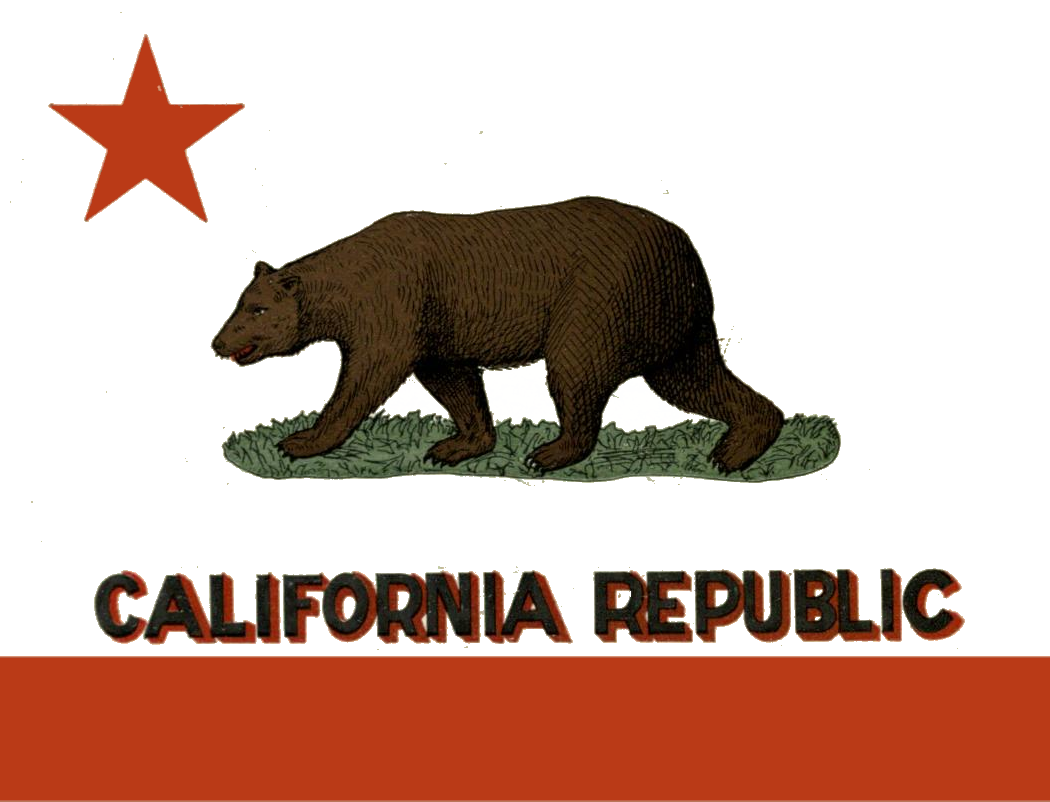
- November 2, 1920
- Turnout: 71.87% (of registered voters) ▼7.70 pp 47.26% (of eligible voters) ▼10.65 pp
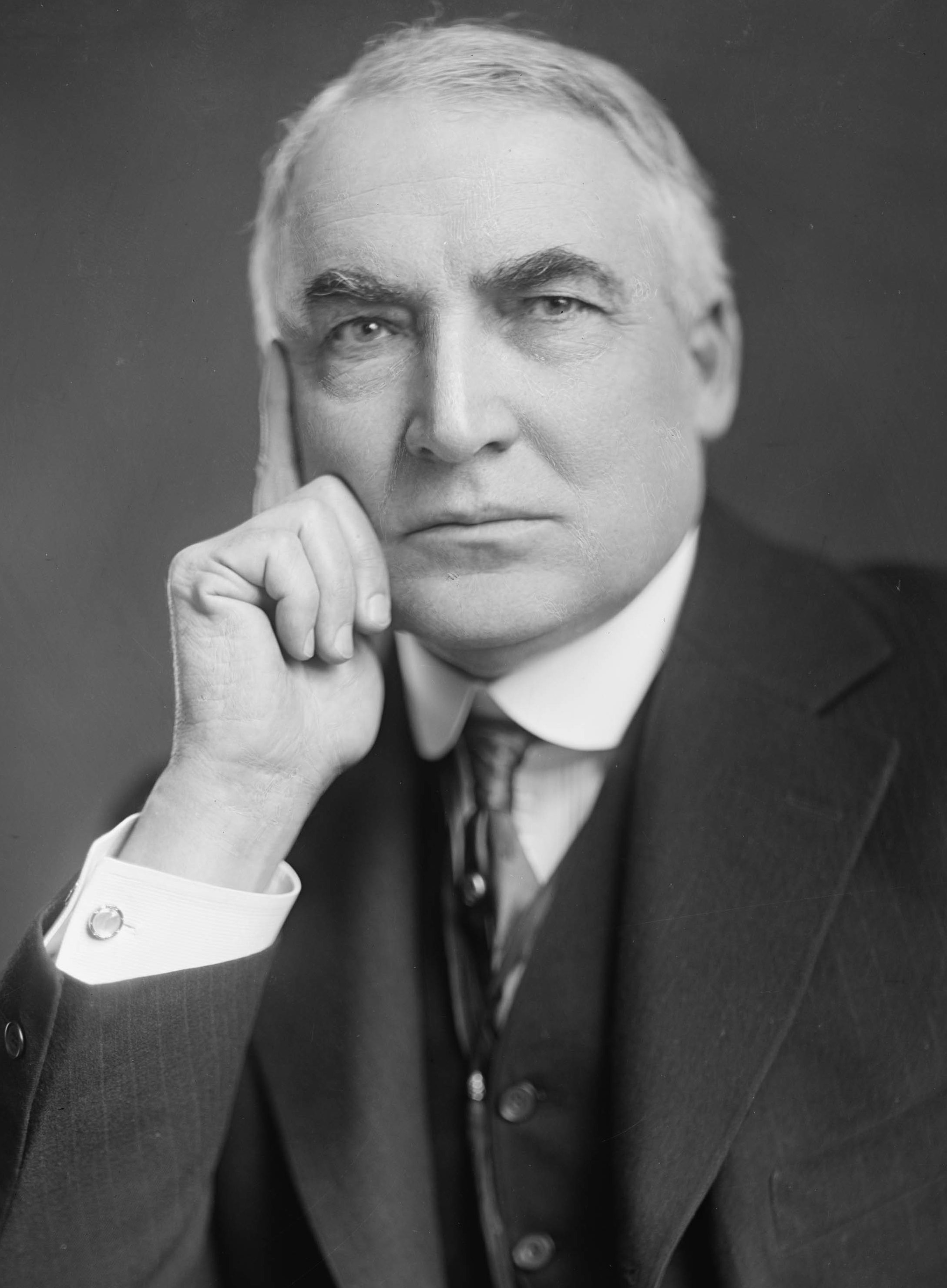

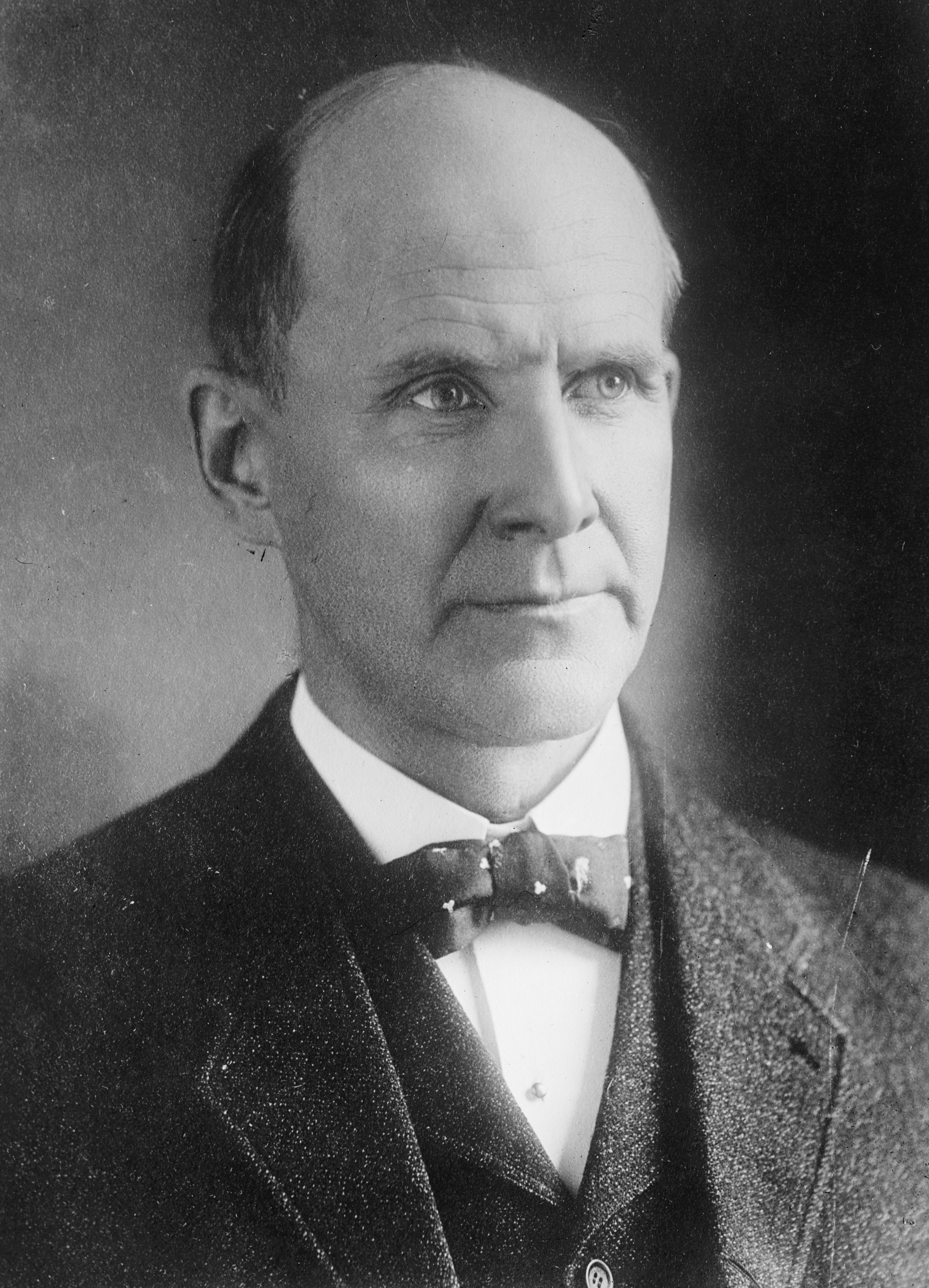
Nominee	Warren G. Harding	James M. Cox	Eugene V. Debs
Party	Republican	Democratic	Socialist
Home state	Ohio	Ohio	Indiana
Running mate	Calvin Coolidge	Franklin D. Roosevelt	Seymour Stedman
Electoral vote	13	0	0
Popular vote	624,992	229,191	64,076
Percentage	66.20%	24.28%	6.79%
County results
Harding
40–50%
50–60%
60–70%
70–80%
90–100%
President before election
Woodrow Wilson
Democratic
Elected President
Warren G. Harding
Republican

The 1920 United States presidential election in California took place on November 2, 1920, as part of the 1920 United States presidential election in which all 48 states participated. California voters chose 13 electors to represent them in the Electoral College via a popular vote pitting Democratic nominee, Governor James M. Cox of Ohio and his running mate, Assistant Secretary of the Navy Franklin D. Roosevelt of New York, against Republican challenger U.S. Senator Warren G. Harding of Ohio and his running mate, Governor Calvin Coolidge of Massachusetts.

By the beginning of 1920 skyrocketing inflation and President Woodrow Wilson's focus upon his proposed League of Nations at the expense of domestic policy had helped make the incumbent president very unpopular – besides which Wilson also had major health problems that had left First Lady Edith Wilson effectively running the nation.

Political unrest observed in the Palmer Raids and the "Red Scare" further added to the unpopularity of the Democratic Party, since this global political turmoil produced considerable fear of alien revolutionaries invading the country. Demand in the West for exclusion of Asian immigrants became even stronger than it had been before. Another issue was the anti-Cox position taken by the Ku Klux Klan, at the time a dominant force in Southern Democratic politics, and Cox's inconsistent stance on newly passed Prohibition – he had been a "wet" before, but announced he would support Prohibition enforcement in August.

The West had been the chief presidential battleground ever since the "System of 1896" emerged following that election. For this reason, Cox chose to tour the entire nation and after touring the Pacific Northwest Cox went to California to defend his proposed League of Nations. Cox argued that the League could have stopped the Asian conflicts – like the Japanese seizure of Shandong – but his apparent defence of Chinese immigrants in the Bay Area was very unpopular and large numbers of hecklers attacked the Democratic candidate. Moreover, the only attention Cox received in the Western press was severe criticism.

== Results ==
General Election Results
Party	Pledged to	Elector	Votes
Republican Party	Warren G. Harding	John H. Rosseter	624,992
Republican Party	Warren G. Harding	W. L. Hollingsworth	624,291
Republican Party	Warren G. Harding	A. H. Hewitt	624,067
Republican Party	Warren G. Harding	A. J. Mathews	624,041
Republican Party	Warren G. Harding	George M. Francis	623,964
Republican Party	Warren G. Harding	C. C. Young	623,920
Republican Party	Warren G. Harding	Wylie M. Giffen	623,778
Republican Party	Warren G. Harding	Lawrence J. Flaherty	623,686
Republican Party	Warren G. Harding	George R. Davis	623,670
Republican Party	Warren G. Harding	Mrs. Edward F. Glaser	623,393
Republican Party	Warren G. Harding	Ed Fletcher	623,333
Republican Party	Warren G. Harding	Mrs. D. C. Stephens	623,279
Republican Party	Warren G. Harding	Mrs. Charles C. Teague	623,172
Democratic Party	James M. Cox	E. L. Doheny	229,191
Democratic Party	James M. Cox	Robert M. Fitzgerald	228,994
Democratic Party	James M. Cox	Francis J. Heney	228,969
Democratic Party	James M. Cox	Thomas Rutledge	228,792
Democratic Party	James M. Cox	John A. Livingston	228,728
Democratic Party	James M. Cox	L. O. Stephens	228,719
Democratic Party	James M. Cox	Arthur C. Huston	228,693
Democratic Party	James M. Cox	James F. Peck	228,579
Democratic Party	James M. Cox	E. S. Heller	228,568
Democratic Party	James M. Cox	Mary E. Foy	228,541
Democratic Party	James M. Cox	Sarah Hagan	228,509
Democratic Party	James M. Cox	Peter F. Zabala	228,477
Democratic Party	James M. Cox	William G. Irving	228,458
Socialist Party	Eugene V. Debs	R. W. Anderson	64,076
Socialist Party	Eugene V. Debs	Isabel King	63,829
Socialist Party	Eugene V. Debs	Joseph Lawrence	63,813
Socialist Party	Eugene V. Debs	Mary Morgan	63,784
Socialist Party	Eugene V. Debs	Fred Bergstrom	63,778
Socialist Party	Eugene V. Debs	Frithiof Sundman	63,761
Socialist Party	Eugene V. Debs	Karl Hellman	63,750
Socialist Party	Eugene V. Debs	Bird E. Morehouse	63,742
Socialist Party	Eugene V. Debs	Anna Macy	63,739
Socialist Party	Eugene V. Debs	Abraham Levin	63,713
Socialist Party	Eugene V. Debs	A. T. Pruess	63,693
Socialist Party	Eugene V. Debs	Clarissa Kneeland	63,692
Socialist Party	Eugene V. Debs	Addie Benedict	63,686
Prohibition Party	Aaron S. Watkins	H. A. Johnson	25,204
Prohibition Party	Aaron S. Watkins	H. P. Stipp	25,085
Prohibition Party	Aaron S. Watkins	Stella B. Irvine	25,057
Prohibition Party	Aaron S. Watkins	Edward Beach	25,047
Prohibition Party	Aaron S. Watkins	Elam Biggs	25,033
Prohibition Party	Aaron S. Watkins	Wiley J. Phillips	24,973
Prohibition Party	Aaron S. Watkins	Ada Ferris	24,953
Prohibition Party	Aaron S. Watkins	F. A. Densmore	24,934
Prohibition Party	Aaron S. Watkins	E. F. Van Vlear	24,930
Prohibition Party	Aaron S. Watkins	T. K. Beard	24,929
Prohibition Party	Aaron S. Watkins	Anna M. De Yo	24,895
Prohibition Party	Aaron S. Watkins	Joseph Fusch	24,886
Prohibition Party	Aaron S. Watkins	O. U. Hull	24,864
Write-in		Scattering	587
Votes cast (Note: Based on totals for highest elector on each ticket)			944,050

=== Results by county ===
County	Warren G. Harding Republican		James M. Cox Democratic		Eugene V. Debs Socialist		Aaron S. Watkins Prohibition		Scattering Write-in		Margin		Total votes cast (Note: Based on the highest elector on each ticket)
County	#	%	#	%	#	%	#	%	#	%	#	%	Total votes cast
Alameda	73,177	69.11%	21,468	20.27%	9,266	8.75%	1,978	1.87%	0	0.00%	51,709	48.83%	105,889
Alpine	64	91.43%	6	8.57%	0	0.00%	0	0.00%	0	0.00%	58	82.86%	70
Amador	1,350	64.13%	639	30.36%	63	2.99%	53	2.52%	0	0.00%	711	33.78%	2,105
Butte	5,409	65.69%	2,262	27.47%	339	4.12%	224	2.72%	0	0.00%	3,147	38.22%	8,234
Calaveras	1,480	63.96%	641	27.70%	111	4.80%	82	3.54%	0	0.00%	839	36.26%	2,314
Colusa	1,645	61.24%	907	33.77%	72	2.68%	62	2.31%	0	0.00%	738	27.48%	2,686
Contra Costa	9,041	63.75%	3,483	24.56%	1,410	9.94%	248	1.75%	0	0.00%	5,558	39.19%	14,182
Del Norte	596	62.61%	279	29.31%	49	5.15%	28	2.94%	0	0.00%	317	33.30%	952
El Dorado	1,636	64.36%	726	28.56%	115	4.52%	65	2.56%	0	0.00%	910	35.80%	2,542
Fresno	14,621	55.36%	9,613	36.39%	1,426	5.40%	753	2.85%	0	0.00%	5,008	18.96%	26,413
Glenn	1,916	64.19%	902	30.22%	89	2.98%	78	2.61%	0	0.00%	1,014	33.97%	2,985
Humboldt	6,528	69.89%	1,778	19.04%	763	8.17%	271	2.90%	0	0.00%	4,750	50.86%	9,340
Imperial	4,699	64.51%	2,022	27.76%	374	5.13%	189	2.59%	0	0.00%	2,677	36.75%	7,284
Inyo	1,195	57.20%	682	32.65%	180	8.62%	32	1.53%	0	0.00%	513	24.56%	2,089
Kern	7,079	49.01%	6,095	42.20%	933	6.46%	337	2.33%	0	0.00%	984	6.81%	14,444
Kings	2,806	59.61%	1,604	34.08%	180	3.82%	117	2.49%	0	0.00%	1,202	25.54%	4,707
Lake	993	57.23%	571	32.91%	75	4.32%	96	5.53%	0	0.00%	422	24.32%	1,735
Lassen	1,582	66.22%	643	26.92%	97	4.06%	67	2.80%	0	0.00%	939	39.31%	2,389
Los Angeles	178,117	69.10%	55,661	21.59%	14,674	5.69%	8,812	3.42%	506	0.20%	122,456	47.51%	257,770
Madera	1,779	55.46%	1,145	35.69%	181	5.64%	103	3.21%	0	0.00%	634	19.76%	3,208
Marin	5,375	68.80%	1,688	21.61%	632	8.09%	118	1.51%	0	0.00%	3,687	47.19%	7,813
Mariposa	484	55.38%	320	36.61%	53	6.06%	17	1.95%	0	0.00%	164	18.76%	874
Mendocino	4,443	65.83%	1,789	26.51%	401	5.94%	116	1.72%	0	0.00%	2,654	39.32%	6,749
Merced	3,457	62.99%	1,537	28.01%	331	6.03%	163	2.97%	0	0.00%	1,920	34.99%	5,488
Modoc	992	62.59%	535	33.75%	36	2.27%	22	1.39%	0	0.00%	457	28.83%	1,585
Mono	170	67.73%	56	22.31%	22	8.76%	3	1.20%	0	0.00%	114	45.42%	251
Monterey	4,817	67.76%	1,771	24.91%	263	3.70%	258	3.63%	0	0.00%	3,046	42.85%	7,109
Napa	4,448	70.99%	1,444	23.05%	274	4.37%	100	1.60%	0	0.00%	3,004	47.94%	6,266
Nevada	2,055	64.97%	747	23.62%	279	8.82%	82	2.59%	0	0.00%	1,308	41.35%	3,163
Orange	12,797	71.52%	3,502	19.57%	632	3.53%	962	5.38%	0	0.00%	9,295	51.95%	17,893
Placer	2,894	59.44%	1,559	32.02%	288	5.91%	128	2.63%	0	0.00%	1,335	27.42%	4,869
Plumas	999	63.96%	403	25.80%	114	7.30%	46	2.94%	0	0.00%	596	38.16%	1,562
Riverside	9,124	69.55%	2,798	21.33%	690	5.26%	506	3.86%	0	0.00%	6,326	48.22%	13,118
Sacramento	15,634	64.87%	7,150	29.67%	944	3.92%	372	1.54%	0	0.00%	8,484	35.20%	24,100
San Benito	1,965	65.00%	900	29.77%	74	2.45%	84	2.78%	0	0.00%	1,065	35.23%	3,023
San Bernardino	12,518	62.84%	5,620	28.21%	890	4.47%	893	4.48%	0	0.00%	6,898	34.63%	19,921
San Diego	19,286	63.78%	8,478	27.27%	1,812	5.83%	971	3.12%	0	0.00%	11,348	36.50%	31,087
San Francisco	96,105	65.18%	32,637	22.13%	17,049	11.56%	1,630	1.11%	29	0.02%	63,468	43.04%	147,450
San Joaquin	12,003	60.94%	6,487	32.93%	695	3.53%	513	2.60%	0	0.00%	5,516	28.00%	19,698
San Luis Obispo	4,123	61.31%	1,606	23.88%	643	9.56%	301	4.48%	52	0.77%	2,517	37.43%	6,725
San Mateo	7,205	70.52%	1,958	19.16%	956	9.36%	98	0.96%	0	0.00%	5,247	51.36%	10,217
Santa Barbara	6,970	67.48%	2,586	25.04%	496	4.80%	277	2.68%	0	0.00%	4,384	42.44%	10,329
Santa Clara	19,565	68.09%	6,485	22.57%	1,667	5.80%	1,015	3.53%	0	0.00%	13,080	45.52%	28,732
Santa Cruz	5,285	66.28%	1,957	24.54%	412	5.17%	320	4.01%	0	0.00%	3,328	41.74%	7,974
Shasta	2,108	62.07%	1,028	30.27%	205	6.04%	55	1.62%	0	0.00%	1,080	31.80%	3,396
Sierra	506	72.18%	158	22.54%	24	3.42%	13	1.85%	0	0.00%	348	49.64%	701
Siskiyou	2,909	60.05%	1,502	31.01%	337	6.96%	96	1.98%	0	0.00%	1,407	29.05%	4,844
Solano	7,102	64.77%	2,954	26.94%	743	6.78%	166	1.51%	0	0.00%	4,148	37.83%	10,965
Sonoma	10,377	66.90%	4,070	26.24%	680	4.38%	385	2.48%	0	0.00%	6,307	40.66%	15,512
Stanislaus	7,038	61.61%	3,055	26.74%	582	5.09%	748	6.55%	0	0.00%	3,983	34.87%	11,423
Sutter	1,862	70.32%	636	24.02%	69	2.61%	81	3.06%	0	0.00%	1,226	46.30%	2,648
Tehama	2,462	61.81%	1,079	27.09%	231	5.80%	211	5.30%	0	0.00%	1,383	34.72%	3,983
Trinity	622	62.89%	285	28.82%	75	7.58%	7	0.71%	0	0.00%	337	34.07%	989
Tulare	9,136	61.26%	4,837	32.43%	527	3.53%	414	2.78%	0	0.00%	4,299	28.83%	14,914
Tuolumne	1,285	59.38%	659	30.45%	157	7.26%	63	2.91%	0	0.00%	626	28.93%	2,164
Ventura	5,231	76.00%	1,305	18.96%	181	2.63%	166	2.41%	0	0.00%	3,926	57.04%	6,883
Yolo	3,375	61.95%	1,787	32.80%	133	2.44%	153	2.81%	0	0.00%	1,588	29.15%	5,448
Yuba	2,012	70.70%	696	24.46%	82	2.88%	56	1.97%	0	0.00%	1,316	46.24%	2,846
Total	624,992	66.20%	229,191	24.28%	64,076	6.79%	25,204	2.67%	587	0.06%	395,801	41.93%	944,050

==== Counties that flipped from Democratic to Republican ====
- Amador
- Butte
- Calaveras
- Colusa
- Contra Costa
- El Dorado
- Fresno
- Glenn
- Imperial
- Inyo
- Kern
- Kings
- Lake
- Lassen
- Madera
- Mariposa
- Merced
- Modoc
- Mono
- Monterey
- Nevada
- Placer
- Plumas
- Sacramento
- San Benito
- San Francisco
- San Joaquin
- San Luis Obispo
- Santa Barbara
- Santa Cruz
- Shasta
- Sierra
- Siskiyou
- Solano
- Stanislaus
- Sutter
- Tehama
- Trinity
- Tulare
- Tuolumne
- Yolo
- Yuba

== Analysis ==
In September, several opinion polls were conducted, all predicting that Harding would carry California, which had been extremely close in the two preceding elections, by over one hundred thousand votes. By the end of October, although no more opinion polls had been published, most observers were even more convinced that the Republicans would take complete control of all branches of government. On election day, Warren Harding carried California by a margin much larger than early polls predicted, winning with 66.20 percent of the vote to James Cox's 24.28 percent. Harding became the first of only two presidential nominees to sweep all of California's counties; the only other one was Franklin D. Roosevelt, the losing 1920 vice-presidential candidate, sixteen years later. Harding's 66.20 percent of the vote was the largest fraction for any presidential candidate in California until Roosevelt won with 66.95 percent in 1936, though his 41.92-percentage-point margin of victory is the largest for any candidate in the state.

This was the first time Colusa County, the one of only two counties in the Pacific States to support Democratic nominee Alton B. Parker in 1904, ever voted Republican. The other such county, Mariposa County, backed a Republican for the first time since 1872. Plumas County would never vote Republican again until Ronald Reagan in 1980, and Amador, El Dorado and Placer Counties would not vote Republican again until Dwight D. Eisenhower in 1952.
