= Paul W. Shafer =

American politician

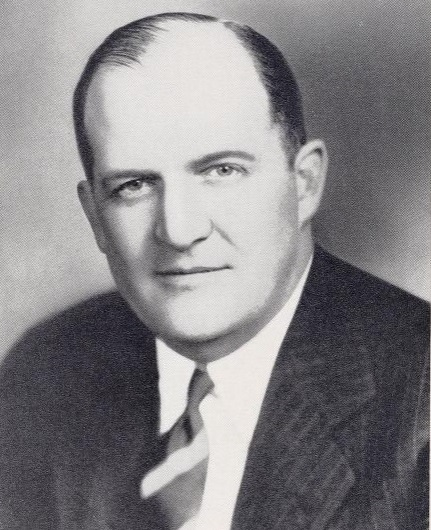
- Frontispiece of 1955's Paul Werntz Shafer, Late a Representative

Member of the U.S. House of Representatives from Michigan's 3rd district
- In office January 3, 1937 – August 17, 1954
- Preceded by: Verner Main
- Succeeded by: August E. Johansen

Personal details
- Born: April 27, 1893 Elkhart, Indiana, U.S.
- Died: August 17, 1954 (aged 61) Washington, D.C., U.S.
- Party: Republican
- Spouse: Ila P. Mack
- Education: Ferris State University

Paul Werntz Shafer (April 27, 1893 – August 17, 1954) was a politician and judge from Michigan. He was a member of the United States House of Representatives from 1937 until his death.

== Biography ==
Shafer was born in Elkhart, Indiana, on April 27, 1893, the son of John McClellan Shafer and Sarah (Werntz) Shafer. His parents relocated their family to Three Rivers, Michigan, where he was raised and attended the public schools. Shafer was a student at Ferris Institute (now Ferris State University), Big Rapids, Michigan, and studied law by correspondence with the Blackstone Institute of Chicago, Illinois. He was a reporter, editor, and publisher of newspapers in Elkhart, Indiana, Battle Creek, Michigan, and Bronson, Michigan. He was a member of the Indiana Army National Guard in 1916 and 1917, and served on the border with Mexico during the Pancho Villa Expedition, but was rejected on medical grounds for service in World War I.

From 1929 to 1936, Shafer served as a municipal judge in Battle Creek. In the Republican Party primary elections of September 1936 for Michigan's 3rd congressional district, Shafer defeated the incumbent Verner W. Main. Shafer went on to be elected to the 75th United States Congress and to the eight succeeding Congresses, serving from January 3, 1937, until his death.

Together with John Howland Snow, Representative Shafer authored The Turning of the Tides, an exposé on the education system of the United States, which was delivered in the House of Representatives on March 21, 1952. In it, the authors took the position that the education system was an alien collectivist (socialist) philosophy, much of which came from Europe, crashed onto the shores of our nation, bringing with it radical changes in economics, politics, and education, funded—surprisingly enough—by several wealthy American families and their tax-exempt foundations. (See also The Deliberate Dumbing Down of America by Charlotte Thomson Iserbyt).

Shafer was injured in an automobile accident in March 1940 while traveling in Columbiana County, Ohio. He suffered head and spinal injuries and spent several weeks being treated in both Salem and Youngstown before being flown back to Michigan from Akron aboard an army plane.

== Death and burial ==
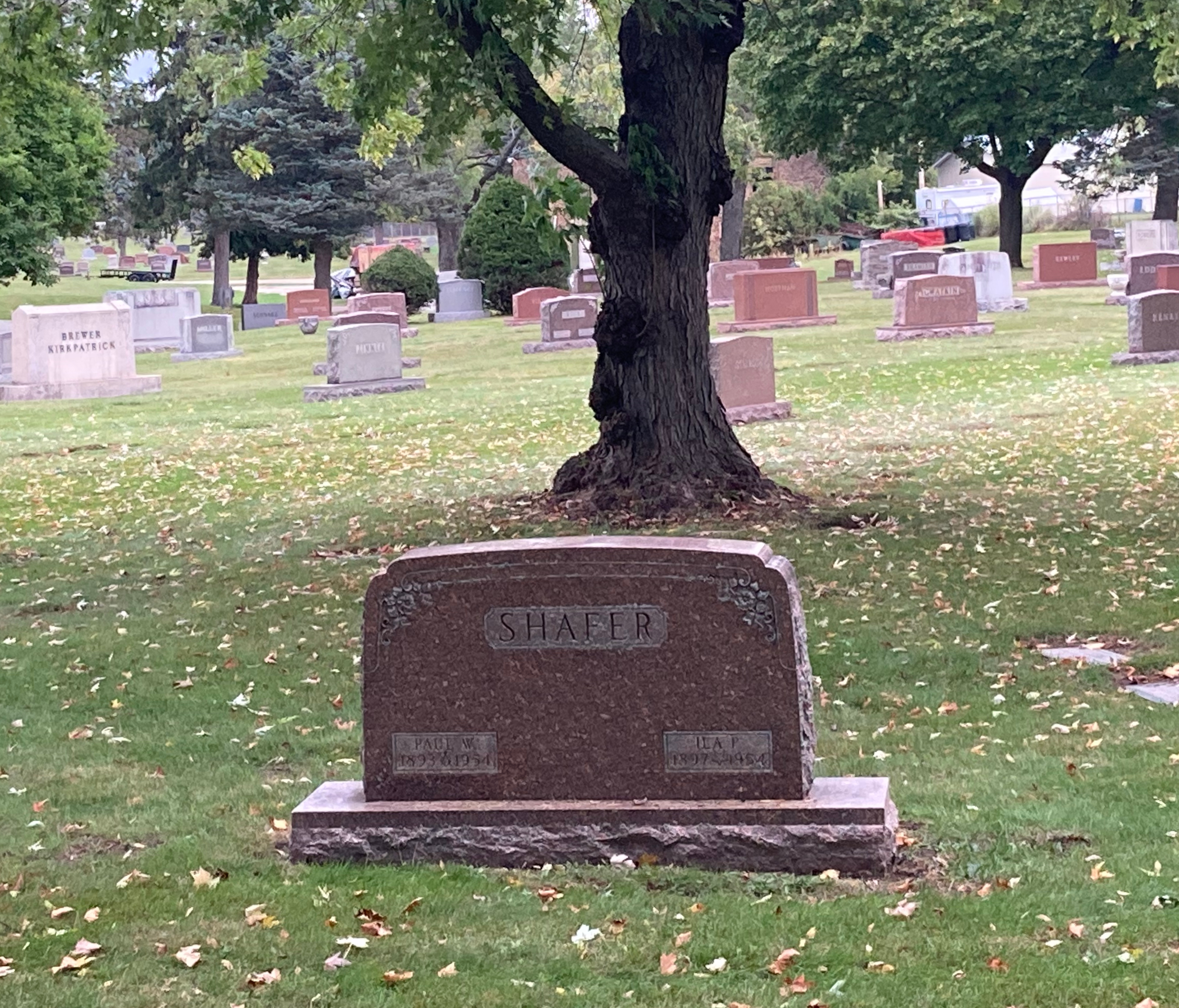
Shafer's grave at Memorial Park Cemetery

He died on August 17, 1954, in Washington, D.C., two weeks after being re-nominated in the Republican primary election to the 84th Congress. He was interred in Memorial Park Cemetery, Battle Creek, Michigan.

== Family ==
In 1917, Shafer married Ila P. Mack of Detroit; they had no children.

== See also ==
- List of members of the United States Congress who died in office (1950–1999)

== Sources ==
=== Books ===
- Paul Werntz Shafer, Late a Representative. Washington, DC: US Government Printing Office. 1955.

U.S. House of Representatives
Preceded by Verner Main	United States representative for the 3rd congressional district of Michigan; January 3, 1937 – August 17, 1954	Succeeded by August E. Johansen
