= 1924 United States House of Representatives elections in California =

United States House of Representatives elections in California, 1924
- November 4, 1924

All 11 California seats to the United States House of Representatives
| | Majority party | Minority party |
|---|---|---|
| Party | Republican | Democratic |
| Last election | 9 | 2 |
| Seats won | 9 | 2 |
| Seat change | Steady | Steady |
| Popular vote | 682,037 | 158,710 |
| Percentage | 68.4% | 15.9% |
- Republican hold Democratic hold

The United States House of Representatives elections in California, 1924 was an election for California's delegation to the United States House of Representatives, which occurred as part of the general election of the House of Representatives on November 4, 1924. California's delegation remained unchanged at 9 Republicans and 2 Democrats.

== Overview ==
United States House of Representatives elections in California, 1924
| Party | Votes | Percentage | Seats |
|---|---|---|---|
| Republican | 682,037 | 68.4% | 9 |
| Democratic | 158,710 | 15.9% | 2 |
| Prohibition | 67,735 | 6.8% | 0 |
| Socialist | 45,058 | 4.5% | 0 |
| Independent | 42,873 | 4.3% | 0 |
| Totals | 996,413 | 100.0% | 11 |

== Results ==
Final results from the Clerk of the House of Representatives:

=== District 1 ===
California's 1st congressional district election, 1924
| Party | Candidate | Votes | % |
|---|---|---|---|
| Democratic | Clarence F. Lea (incumbent) | 47,250 | 100.0 |
| Turnout | | | |
| Democratic hold | | | |

=== District 2 ===
California's 2nd congressional district election, 1924
| Party | Candidate | Votes | % |
|---|---|---|---|
| Democratic | John E. Raker (incumbent) | 30,590 | 100.0 |
| Turnout | | | |
| Democratic hold | | | |

=== District 3 ===
California's 3rd congressional district election, 1924
| Party | Candidate | Votes | % |
|---|---|---|---|
| Republican | Charles F. Curry (incumbent) | 61,512 | 80.7 |
| Socialist | James H. Barkley | 14,665 | 19.3 |
| Total votes | | 76,177 | 100.0 |
| Turnout | | | |
| Republican hold | | | |

=== District 4 ===
California's 4th congressional district election, 1924
| Party | Candidate | Votes | % |
|---|---|---|---|
| Republican | Julius Kahn (incumbent) | 44,048 | 81 |
| Socialist | William McDevitt | 10,360 | 19 |
| Total votes | | 54,408 | 100 |
| Turnout | | | |
| Republican hold | | | |

=== District 5 ===
California's 5th congressional district election, 1924
| Party | Candidate | Votes | % |
|---|---|---|---|
| Republican | Lawrence J. Flaherty | 38,893 | 72.6 |
| Socialist | Isabel C. King | 12,175 | 27.4 |
| Total votes | | 51,068 | 100.0 |
| Turnout | | | |
| Republican hold | | | |

=== District 6 ===
California's 6th congressional district election, 1924
| Party | Candidate | Votes | % |
|---|---|---|---|
| Republican | Albert E. Carter | 68,547 | 57.5 |
| Independent | John L. Davie | 42,873 | 35.9 |
| Socialist | Herbert L. Coggins | 7,858 | 7.6 |
| Total votes | | 119,278 | 100.0 |
| Turnout | | | |
| Republican hold | | | |

=== District 7 ===
California's 7th congressional district election, 1924
| Party | Candidate | Votes | % |
|---|---|---|---|
| Republican | Henry E. Barbour (incumbent) | 65,740 | 100.0 |
| Turnout | | | |
| Republican hold | | | |

=== District 8 ===
California's 8th congressional district election, 1924
| Party | Candidate | Votes | % |
|---|---|---|---|
| Republican | Arthur M. Free (incumbent) | 55,713 | 100.0 |
| Turnout | | | |
| Republican hold | | | |

=== District 9 ===
California's 9th congressional district election, 1924
| Party | Candidate | Votes | % |
|---|---|---|---|
| Republican | Walter F. Lineberger (incumbent) | 119,993 | 63.9 |
| Prohibition | Charles H. Randall | 67,735 | 36.1 |
| Total votes | | 187,728 | 100.0 |
| Turnout | | | |
| Republican hold | | | |

=== District 10 ===
California's 10th congressional district election, 1924
| Party | Candidate | Votes | % |
|---|---|---|---|
| Republican | John D. Fredericks (incumbent) | 133,780 | 62.3 |
| Democratic | Robert W. Richardson | 80,870 | 37.7 |
| Total votes | | 214,650 | 100.0 |
| Turnout | | | |
| Republican hold | | | |

=== District 11 ===
California's 11th congressional district election, 1924
| Party | Candidate | Votes | % |
|---|---|---|---|
| Republican | Philip D. Swing (incumbent) | 93,811 | 100.0 |
| Turnout | | | |
| Republican hold | | | |

== See also ==
- 69th United States Congress
- Political party strength in California
- Political party strength in U.S. states
- 1924 United States House of Representatives elections
