= Mayfield–Newton Act =

- Other short titles: Mayfield Act; Pub. L. 69-804 Ch. 510
- Long title: An act to amend the Interstate Commerce Act and the Transportation Act, 1920, and for other purposes.
- Enacted by: the 69th United States Congress

Codification
- Acts amended: Interstate Commerce Act; Esch–Cummins Act

Legislative history
- Introduced in the Senate as S. 3286 by Earle B. Mayfield, D–TX and Walter H. Newton, R–MN; Signed into law by President Calvin Coolidge on March 4, 1927

In United States federal law, the Mayfield–Newton Act, or the Mayfield Act, was an act passed by the United States Congress on March 4, 1927, amending the Interstate Commerce Act, the Esch–Cummins Act, and the Uniform Bill of Lading to "authorize reduced freight rates in cases of emergency", including earthquake, fire, flood, famine drought, epidemic, and pestilence. Sponsored by Sen. Earle B. Mayfield (D) of Texas and Rep. Walter H. Newton (R) of Minnesota, the act changed the original maximum suspension, which had been fixed by the Mann-Elkins Act of 1910, to 120 days, extendable by the Interstate Commerce Commission to 6 months – the Esch-Cummins Act reduced the extension period to 30 days while the Mayfield-Newton Act of 1927 replaced the provision with a single period of 7 months.
