= Arthur B. Williams =

American politician

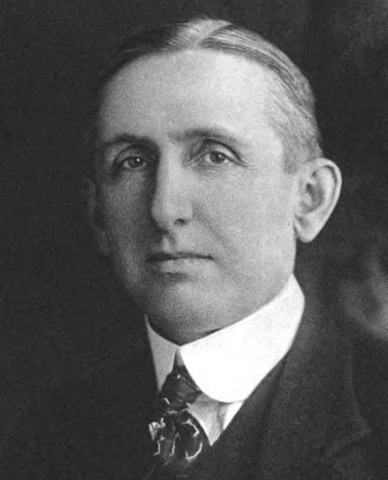
- Frontispiece of 1926's Arthur B. Williams, Late a Representative

Member of the U.S. House of Representatives from Michigan's 3rd district
- In office June 19, 1923 – May 1, 1925
- Preceded by: John M. C. Smith
- Succeeded by: Joseph L. Hooper

Personal details
- Born: January 27, 1872 Ashland, Ohio, U.S.
- Died: January 5, 1925 (aged 52) Baltimore, Maryland, U.S.
- Party: Republican
- Education: Olivet College

Arthur Bruce Williams (January 27, 1872 – May 1, 1925) was a politician from the U.S. state of Michigan.

== Biography ==
Williams's grave (rightmost) at Maple Hill Cemetery

Williams was born in Ashland, Ohio on January 27, 1872, and attended the common schools of Eaton County, Michigan. He graduated from Olivet College, in 1892, studied law with John M. C. Smith, attained admission to the bar in 1894, and commenced practice in Battle Creek. He was interested in agricultural pursuits at his summer home in Gull Lake. He served as director of the Old National Bank in Battle Creek, and also as vice president and general counsel of the Postum Cereal Company. He also served as president of the Michigan Manufacturers' Association.

On June 19, 1923, Williams was elected as a Republican from Michigan's 3rd congressional district to the 68th United States Congress to fill the vacancy caused by the death of John M. C. Smith. In 1924 he was re-elected to the 69th Congress and served until his death in Baltimore, Maryland. He was interred in Maple Hill Cemetery in Charlotte, Michigan.

== See also ==
- List of members of the United States Congress who died in office (1900–1949)

== Sources ==
=== Books ===
- Arthur B. Williams, Late a Representative. Washington, DC: US Government Printing Office. 1926.

U.S. House of Representatives
Preceded by John M. C. Smith	United States representative for the 3rd congressional district of Michigan; June 19, 1923 – May 1, 1925	Succeeded by Joseph L. Hooper
