= Verner Main =

American politician

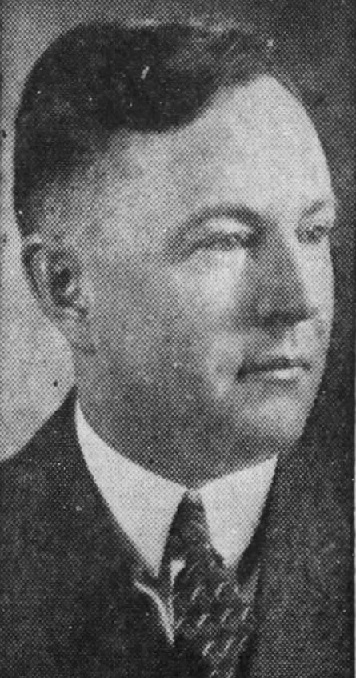
- Press & Sun-Bulletin (Binghamton, NY), December 18, 1935

Member of the U.S. House of Representatives from Michigan's 3rd district
- In office December 17, 1935 – January 3, 1937
- Preceded by: Henry M. Kimball
- Succeeded by: Paul W. Shafer

Member of the Michigan State House of Representatives
- In office 1927–1929

Personal details
- Born: December 16, 1885 Ashley, Ohio, U.S.
- Died: July 6, 1965 (aged 79) Battle Creek, Michigan, U.S.
- Party: Republican
- Education: Hillsdale College; University of Michigan

Verner Wright Main (December 16, 1885 – July 6, 1965) was a politician from the U.S. state of Michigan.

Main was born in Ashley, Ohio, where he attended the public schools. He graduated from Marion High School in Marion, Ohio. He also graduated from Hillsdale College of Michigan in 1907, and from the law department of the University of Michigan at Ann Arbor in 1914. He served as principal of the high schools at Hudson, Michigan in 1908 and 1909 and at Niles from 1909 to 1912. He was admitted to the bar in 1914 and commenced the practice of law in Battle Creek.

During the First World War, Main volunteered for military service with the Field Artillery and was in training at the officers' training camp at Louisville, Kentucky when the armistice was signed. He later served as assistant prosecuting attorney of Calhoun County, Michigan in 1926. He served in the Michigan State House of Representatives from 1927 to 1929. He was also a member of the Battle Creek School Board 1929-1932.

Main was elected as a Republican from Michigan's 3rd congressional district to the 74th Congress to fill the vacancy caused by the death of Henry M. Kimball and served from December 17, 1935 to January 3, 1937. He was an unsuccessful candidate for re-nomination in 1936, losing to Paul W. Shafer in the Republican primary election. Main resumed the practice of law. He died in Battle Creek and is interred there in Oak Hill Cemetery.

U.S. House of Representatives
Preceded by Henry M. Kimball	United States Representative for the 3rd congressional district of Michigan; December 17, 1935 – January 3, 1937	Succeeded by Paul W. Shafer
