= Cooperative Marketing Act =

- Other short titles: Cooperative Marketing Act of 1926
- Long title: An Act To create a division of cooperative marketing in the Department of Agriculture; to provide for the acquisition and dissemination of information pertaining to cooperative marketing; to promote the knowledge of cooperative principles and practices; and for other purposes
- Enacted by: the 69th United States Congress

Citations
- Public law: Pub. L. 69–450
- Statutes at Large: 44 Stat. 802

Codification
- Titles amended: 7

Legislative history
- Introduced in the House as H.R. 6245 by Gilbert N. Haugen; Committee consideration by House Agriculture; Passed the House on; Passed the Senate on; Signed into law by President Calvin Coolidge on July 2, 1926

The Cooperative Marketing Act of 1926 44 Stat. 802 (1926) was a piece of agricultural legislation passed in the United States which expanded upon the Capper–Volstead Act of 1922. It allowed farmers to exchange “past, present, and prospective crop, market, statistical, economic, and other similar information” at their local cooperative meeting, without breaking antitrust laws. Previously, under the Capper–Volstead Act, they had only been permitted to exchange pricing information.

Under the Cooperative Marketing Act, farmers and their local, regional, and national cooperatives could legally exchange a host of information within their marketing systems. It was a critically important strategic authorization that enabled federated cooperative systems and marketing agencies-in-common to effectively function as coordinated entities.

In addition, the Act created the Division of Cooperative Marketing within the United States Department of Agriculture to assist cooperatives in gathering and sharing data on output, prices, and demand. The Act also created the Cooperative Research and Service Division which conducted research and service activities relating to problems of management, organization policies, merchandising, sales, costs, competition, and membership arising in connection with the cooperative marketing of agricultural products and the cooperative purchase of farm supplies and services.

The Cooperative Marketing act was useful, but it was still not satisfactory to the Farm Bureau or other farm lobbyist groups. For farmers, an increase in available information to help cooperatives work together was no substitute for the price floor on select crops that they demanded. Demand for a price floor was steady, and culminated in the passage of the McNary-Haugen bills in 1927, and again in 1928, both which suffered the veto of President Calvin Coolidge.

More recently, "[t]he Treasury Department and the IRS considered a similar but alternative definition of agricultural or horticultural products as agricultural, horticultural, viticultural, and dairy products, livestock and poultry, bees, forest products, fish and shellfish, and any products thereof, including processed and manufactured products, and any and all products raised or produced on farms and any processed or manufactured product thereof within the meaning of the Agricultural Marketing Act of 1946, 60 Stat. 1091 (1946). While very similar to the definition set forth in these proposed rules, the Treasury Department and the IRS proposed using the definition based on the Cooperative Marketing Act of 1926, which specifically concerns cooperatives, unlike the Agricultural Marketing Act of 1946, which concerns the marketing and distribution of agricultural products."
