= Henry M. Kimball =

American politician

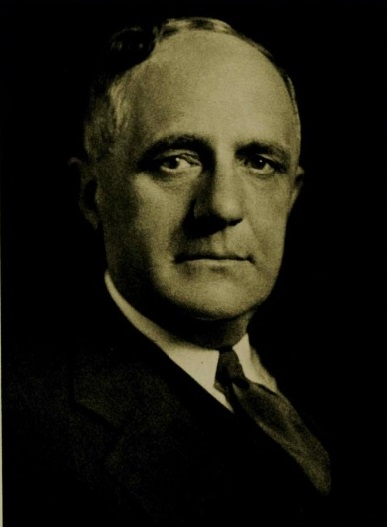
- Frontispiece of 1936's Henry Mahlon Kimball, Late a Representative

Member of the U.S. House of Representatives from Michigan's 3rd district
- In office January 3, 1935 – October 19, 1935
- Preceded by: Joseph L. Hooper
- Succeeded by: Verner Main

Personal details
- Born: August 27, 1878 Orland, Indiana, U.S.
- Died: October 19, 1935 (aged 57) Kalamazoo, Michigan, U.S.
- Party: Republican
- Education: Hillsdale College; University of Michigan

Henry Mahlon Kimball (August 27, 1878 – October 19, 1935) was an American politician in Michigan.

Kimball was born in Orland, Indiana, and attended the common and high schools of Orland. He graduated from Hillsdale College in Michigan and served as principal of Orland High School. He attended the literary and law departments of the University of Michigan at Ann Arbor, graduated in law in 1904, and commenced practice in Orland. In 1907, he moved to Rosebud in Pershing County, Nevada, and continued the practice of law. He was later employed as a traveling auditor in 1908 for a firm in San Francisco, California. He moved to Portland, Oregon in 1909 and to Kalamazoo, Michigan, in 1917, where he continued the practice of law.

Kimball was elected as a Republican from Michigan's 3rd congressional district to the 74th Congress serving from January 3, 1935, until his death in Kalamazoo. His remains were cremated, and the ashes interred in Green Lawn Cemetery, Orland, Indiana.

== See also ==
- List of members of the United States Congress who died in office (1900–1949)

U.S. House of Representatives
Preceded by Joseph Hooper	United States representative for the 3rd congressional district of Michigan; January 3, 1935 – October 19, 1935	Succeeded by Verner Main
