= Joseph L. Hooper =

American politician

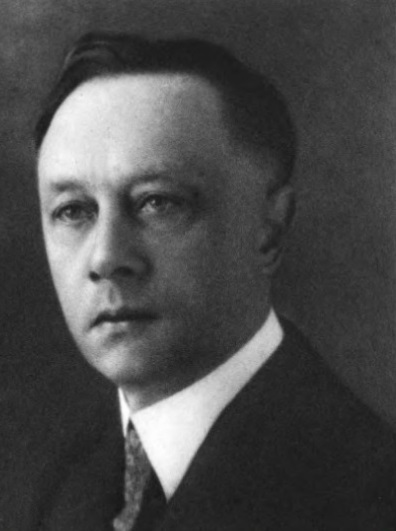
- Frontispiece of 1934's Joseph L. Hooper, Late a Representative

Member of the U.S. House of Representatives from Michigan's 3rd district
- In office August 18, 1925 – February 22, 1934
- Preceded by: Arthur B. Williams
- Succeeded by: Henry M. Kimball

Personal details
- Born: December 22, 1877 Cleveland, Ohio, U.S.
- Died: February 22, 1934 (aged 56) Washington, D.C., U.S.
- Party: Republican

Joseph Lawrence Hooper (December 22, 1877 – February 22, 1934) was a politician from the U.S. state of Michigan.

== Biography ==
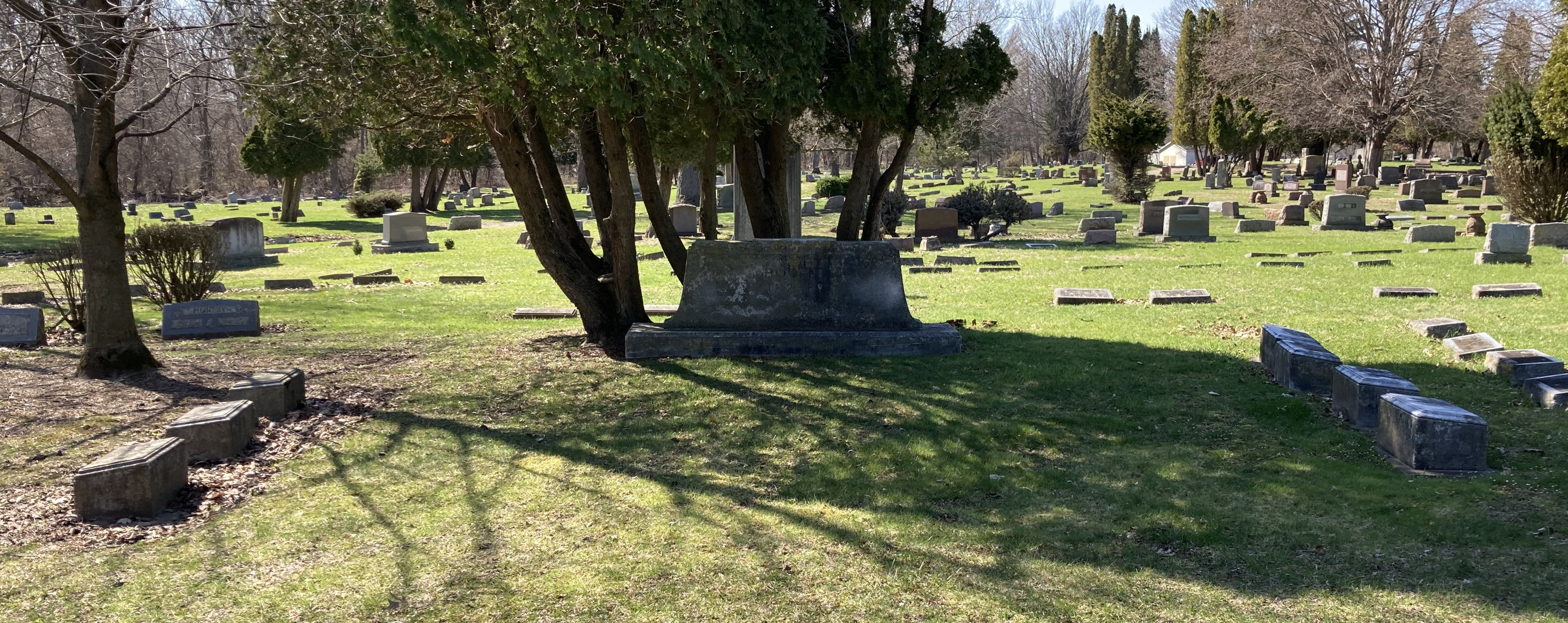
Hooper's grave at Oak Hill Cemetery

Hooper was born in Cleveland, Ohio on December 22, 1877 and moved to Michigan with his parents, who settled in Battle Creek, Michigan in 1891. He attended the public schools, studied law, was admitted to the bar in 1899, and commenced practice in Battle Creek. He was circuit court commissioner of Calhoun County, 1901–1903; prosecuting attorney of Calhoun County, 1903–1907; and city attorney of Battle Creek, 1916–1918. He was also a Congregationalist and a member of the Freemasons.

Hooper was elected as a Republican from Michigan's 3rd congressional district to the 69th United States Congress to fill the vacancy caused by the death of Arthur B. Williams. He was reelected to the 70th and to the three succeeding Congresses, serving from August 18, 1925, until his death in Washington, D.C. He was interred in Oak Hill Cemetery in Battle Creek.

He married Leah Lucas in 1903; she died in 1910, and he married again in 1923 to Gertrude J. Clark. He was survived by his second wife and two daughters.

He died suddenly, at his desk in Washington, D. C., on February 22, 1934.

== See also ==
- List of members of the United States Congress who died in office (1900–1949)

== Sources ==
=== Books ===
- Joseph L. Hooper, Late a Representative. Washington, DC: US Government Printing Office. 1934.

U.S. House of Representatives
Preceded by Arthur B. Williams	United States representative for the 3rd congressional district of Michigan; August 18, 1925 – February 22, 1934	Succeeded by Henry M. Kimball
