= Lawrence J. Flaherty =

American politician

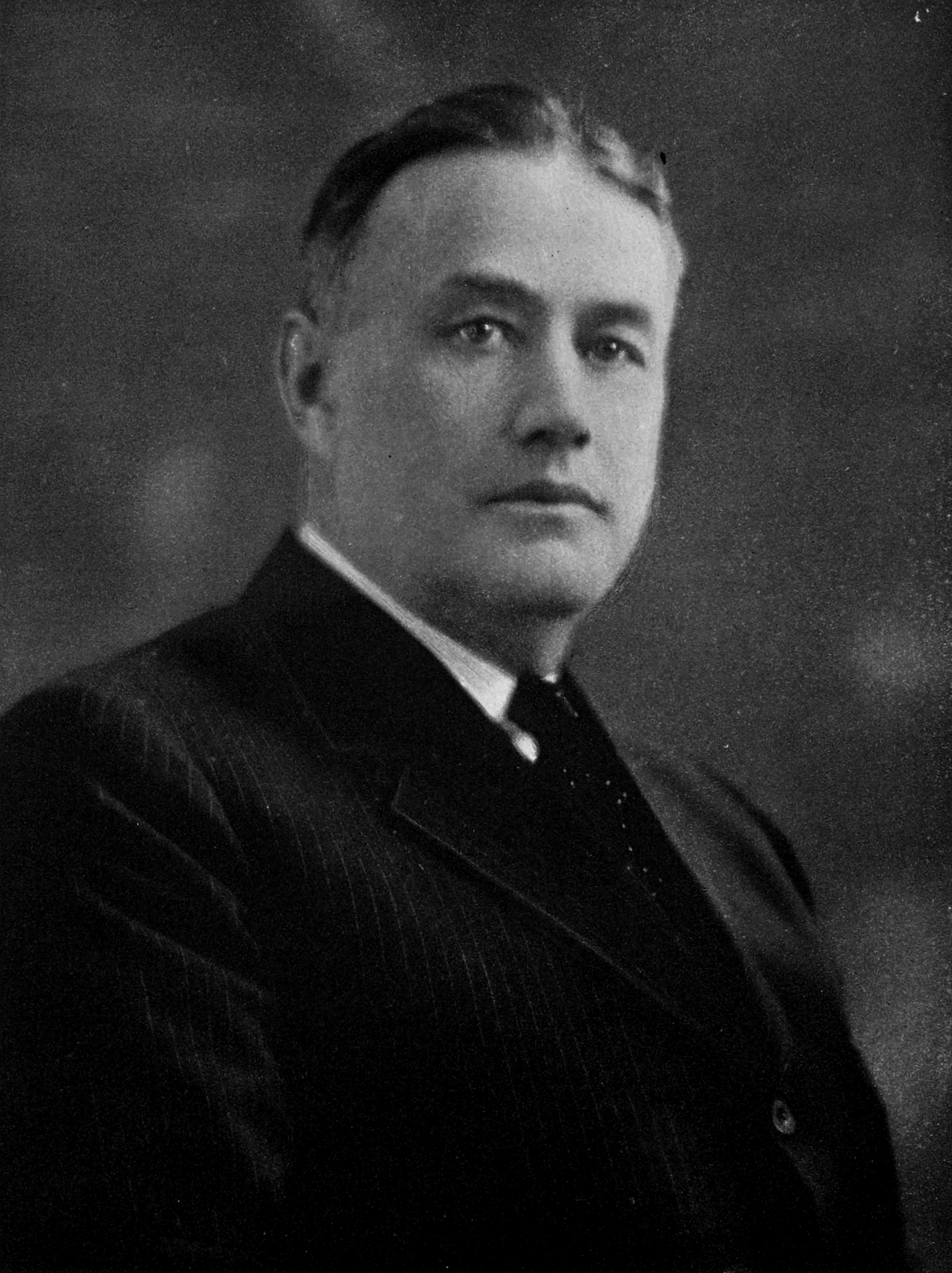
- Portrait by Harris & Ewing c. 1925–1926

Member of the U.S. House of Representatives from California's 5th district
- In office March 4, 1925 – June 13, 1926
- Preceded by: Mae E. Nolan
- Succeeded by: Richard J. Welch

Member of the California Senate from the 24th district
- In office January 4, 1915 – January 8, 1923
- Preceded by: Dominic Joseph Beban
- Succeeded by: Daniel C. Murphy

Member of the San Francisco Board of Police Commissioners
- In office May 31, 1911 – December 20, 1911
- Appointed by: P. H. McCarthy
- Preceded by: Walter E. O'Connell
- Succeeded by: Alexander O'Grady

Personal details
- Born: July 4, 1878 San Mateo, California, U.S.
- Died: June 13, 1926 (aged 47) New York City, New York, U.S.
- Resting place: Holy Cross Cemetery, near San Mateo, California
- Party: Union Labor; Progressive; Republican

Lawrence James Flaherty (July 4, 1878 – June 13, 1926) was an American cement mason, labor leader and politician who served part of one term as a U.S. representative from California from 1925 until his death in 1926.

== Early life ==
Born in San Mateo, California, Flaherty moved with his parents to San Francisco in 1888. He attended public school and learned the trade of a cement mason, joining the Cement Workers' Union No. 580 and serving 17 years as its business agent.

== Early political career ==
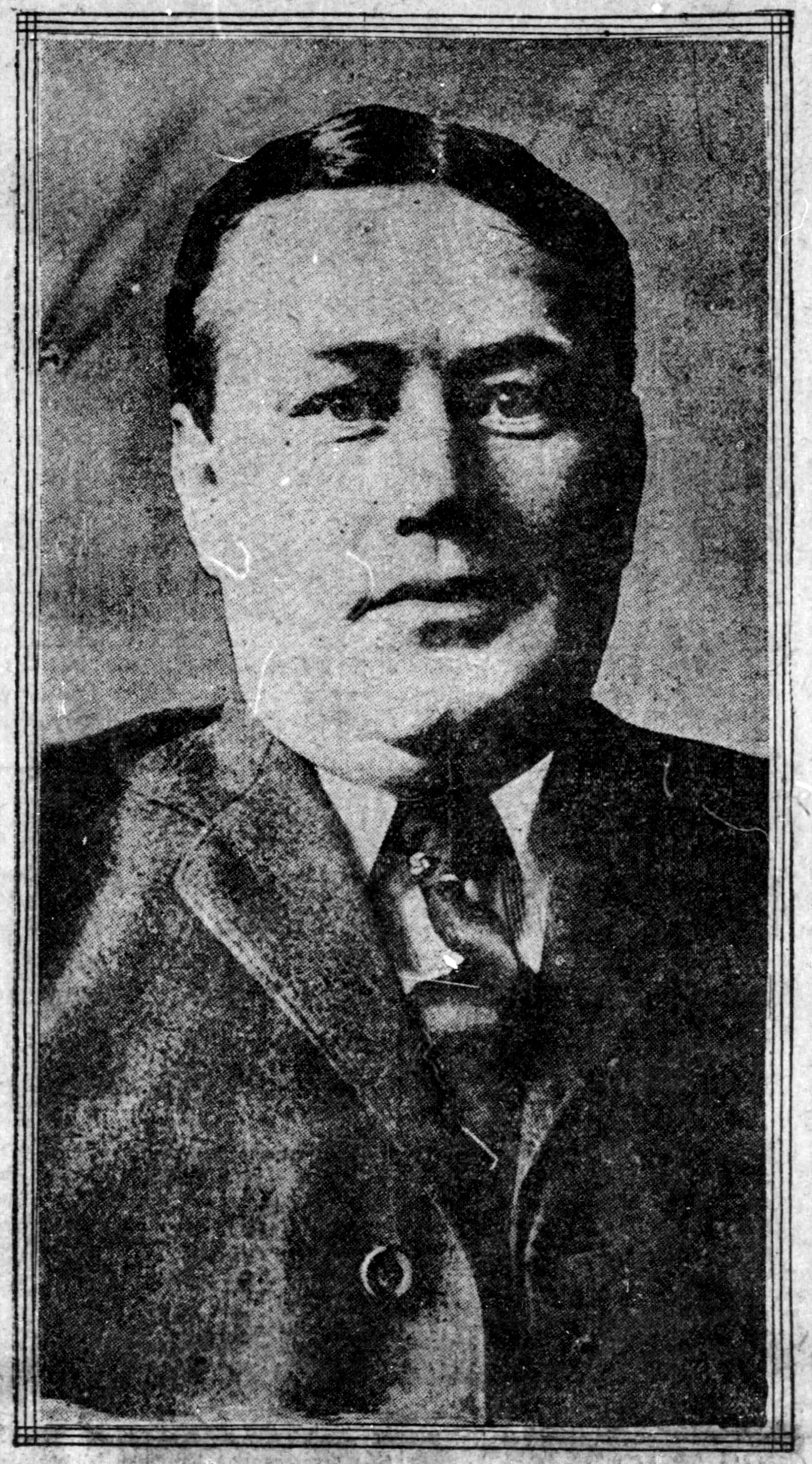
Flaherty in 1911

An active member of the Union Labor Party, Flaherty was appointed a member of the San Francisco Board of Police Commissioners by mayor P. H. McCarthy, serving from May to December 1911. He was then elected to the California State Senate in 1914 as a Progressive Republican, serving from 1915 to 1923, during which he was an ally of Governor Hiram Johnson and won the "highest rating for labor record ever attained by any member of that body." The San Francisco Call listed the most important legislation he sponsored as follows:

Homes for working people, San Francisco Nautical School, university extension, development of Islais Creek, local control of San Francisco harbor funds, anti-injunction bill, protection of immigrants on docks, adequate service by water companies, guarantee of payments for harvest labor, regulation of employment agencies, state warehouses, elevators, oil tanks, etc.; prohibiting bribery in baseball games and enlarging San Francisco's waterfront.

— The San Francisco Call, June 14, 1926

Flaherty also served as president of the San Francisco Building Trades Council from 1921 to 1926. He was appointed United States surveyor of customs for the port of San Francisco on November 1, 1921, and served until March 3, 1925, when he resigned, having been elected to Congress.

== Congressional career and death ==
Flaherty was elected as a Republican to the Sixty-ninth Congress and served from March 4, 1925, until his death in New York City on June 13, 1926, aged 47. He had suffered from ill health since shortly after his election.

=== Internment ===
Flaherty was interred in Holy Cross Cemetery, near San Mateo, California.

== Electoral history ==
1924 United States House of Representatives elections in California
Party	Candidate	Votes	%
Republican	Lawrence J. Flaherty	38,893	72.6
Socialist	Isabel C. King	12,175	27.4
Total votes		51,068	100.0
Turnout			
Republican hold			

== See also ==
- List of members of the United States Congress who died in office (1900–1949)

U.S. House of Representatives
Preceded by Mae E. Nolan	Member of the U.S. House of Representatives from California's 5th congressional district 1925–1926	Succeeded by Richard J. Welch
