= Charlotte Thomson Iserbyt =

American writer and senior policy advisor (1930–2022)

Charlotte Thomson Iserbyt (October 26, 1930 – February 8, 2022) was an American writer and former senior policy advisor to the U.S. Department of Education under President Ronald Reagan. She is best known for her book, The Deliberate Dumbing Down of America, in which she argues that the American public education system was intentionally altered to eliminate parental influence and mold children for a globalist, socialist-collectivist future.

== Early life and education ==
Iserbyt was born in Brooklyn, New York on October 26, 1930. She attended Dana Hall preparatory school and Katharine Gibbs College in New York City, where she studied business. Iserbyt's father and grandfather were Yale University graduates and members of the Skull and Bones secret society.

== Career ==
Iserbyt served as the senior policy advisor in the Office of Educational Research and Improvement (OERI) from 1980 to 1982. During this time, she reportedly leaked documents suggesting that education reforms were part of a coordinated effort involving Soviet-style indoctrination, which led to her departure from the department. Other Roles: She previously worked for the U.S. Department of State in South Africa, Belgium, and South Korea, and served as an elected school board member in Camden, Maine, from 1976 to 1979. She also co-founded the Maine Conservative Union and Guardians of Education for Maine. Publications: In addition to her 1999 book The Deliberate Dumbing Down of America, she authored Back to Basics Reform (1985), which documented her experiences in the Department of Education. She also produced an 8-DVD/CD set titled Exposing the Global Road to Ruin Through Education.

Iserbyt served as the senior policy advisor in the Office of Educational Research and Improvement (OERI), U.S. Department of Education, during the first term of U.S. President Ronald Reagan.

Iserbyt later served as a staff employee of the U.S. Department of State (South Africa, Belgium, South Korea).

From 1999, she served as President of 3D Research, Co. in Bath, Maine.

== Publications ==
Iserbyt is known for writing the book The Deliberate Dumbing Down of America. The book argues that gradual changes to the American public education system are being used to eliminate the influences of a child's parents, and mold the child into a member of the proletariat in preparation for a socialist-collectivist world of the future. She considers that these changes originated from plans formulated primarily by the Andrew Carnegie Foundation for the Advancement of Education and Rockefeller General Education Board, and details the psychological methods used to implement and effect the changes.

Iserbyt also wrote Back to Basics Reform, which documents her experiences working in the Department of Education.

== Personal life and death ==
In 1964, Iserbyt married Jan Iserbyt (2 May 1929 – 5 May 2008); they had two sons.

Iserbyt also served as an elected school board member in Camden, Maine 1976–1979, and founded the Maine Conservative Union, an affiliate of the national American Conservative Union, and Guardians of Education for Maine.

Iserbyt passed away at her home in Dresden, Maine, on February 8, 2022, at the age of 91. She was buried in St. Patrick's Cemetery next to her husband, Jan Iserbyt, who died in 2008.

== Publications ==
- Back to Basics Reform, or OBE: Skinnerian International Curriculum (1985).
- The Deliberate Dumbing Down of America: A Chronological Paper Trail (1999). ISBN 978-0966707106.

== See also ==
- Antony C. Sutton
- John Taylor Gatto

== Sources ==
- Goodlad, Dr. Professor John. "John Goodlad education". Google Scholar. Various academic publications. Retrieved June 2018.
