= 69th United States Congress =

1925-1927 U.S. Congress

←	68th	70th	→
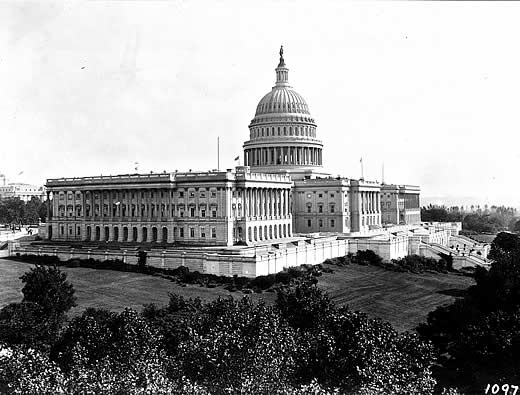
- United States Capitol (1906)

Overview
- Legislative body: United States Congress
- Jurisdiction: United States
- Term: March 4, 1925 – March 4, 1927

Senate
- Members: 96
- President: Charles G. Dawes (R)
- President pro tempore: George H. Moses (R)
- Party control: Republican

House of Representatives
- Members: 435 representatives 5 non-voting delegates
- Speaker: Nicholas Longworth (R)
- Party control: Republican

Sessions
- Special (Note: Special session of the Senate.): March 4, 1925 – March 18, 1925
- 1st: December 7, 1925 – July 3, 1926
- 2nd: December 6, 1926 – March 3, 1927

The 69th United States Congress was a meeting of the legislative branch of the United States federal government, consisting of the United States Senate and the United States House of Representatives. It met in Washington, D.C. from March 4, 1925, to March 4, 1927, during the third and fourth years of Calvin Coolidge's presidency. The apportionment of seats in the House of Representatives was based on the 1910 United States census.

The Republicans made modest gains in maintaining their majority in both chambers, and with the election of President Calvin Coolidge to his own term in office, the Republicans maintained an overall federal government trifecta.

== Major events ==
A special session of the Senate was called by President Coolidge on February 14, 1925.

- Impeachment of Judge George W. English — On April 1, 1926, the House of Representatives impeached Judge George W. English of the United States District Court for the Eastern District of Illinois. Both Houses adjourned on July 3, 1926, with the Senate scheduled to reconvene on November 10, 1926, as a Court of Impeachment. English resigned before the impeachment trial began. The Senate met as planned on November 10, 1926, to adjourn the court of impeachment sine die. On December 13, 1926, the Senate, acting on advice from the House managers of the impeachment, formally dismissed all charges against Judge English.
- January 17, 1927: U.S. Supreme Court held (McGrain v. Daugherty) that Congress has the power to compel witness and testimony.

== Major legislation ==
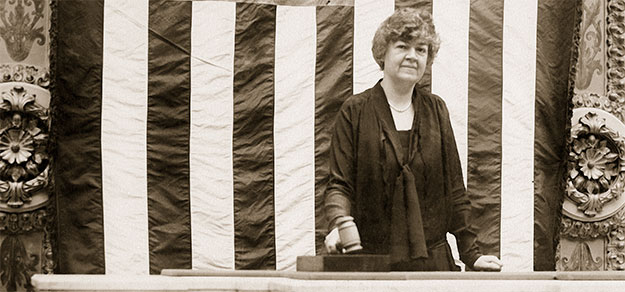
Representative Edith Nourse Rogers of Massachusetts presiding over the House chamber in 1926

- February 26, 1926: Revenue Act of 1926
- April 12, 1926: Timber Exportation Act of 1926
- May 8, 1926: Federal Interpleader Act of 1926
- May 20, 1926: Air Commerce Act
- May 20, 1926: Federal Black Bass Act of 1926
- May 20, 1926: Railway Labor Act (Parker-Watson Act)
- May 25, 1926: Omnibus Adjustment Act of 1926
- May 25, 1926: Public Buildings Act of 1926 (Elliot-Fernald Act)
- May 26, 1926: Shenandoah National Park Act of 1926
- June 3, 1926: Subsistence Expense Act of 1926
- June 14, 1926: Recreation and Public Purposes Act
- June 15, 1926: Limitation of National Forest Designation Act
- July 2, 1926: Cooperative Marketing Act
- July 3, 1926: Walsh Act
- July 3, 1926: Passport Act of 1926
- July 4, 1926: United States Sesquicentennial
- January 21, 1927: River and Harbors Act of 1927
- February 23, 1927: Radio Act of 1927 (Dill-White Act)
- February 25, 1927: McFadden Act (Pepper-McFadden Act)
- March 3, 1927: Foreign and Domestic Commerce Act of 1927
- March 3, 1927: Produce Agency Act of 1927
- March 4, 1927: Mayfield-Newton Act

== Party summary ==
Senators' party membership by state at the opening of the 69th Congress in March 1925. The green stripes denote Farmer-Labor Senator Henrik Shipstead. 2 Democrats 1 Democrat and 1 Republican 2 Republicans

The count below identifies party affiliations at the beginning of the first session of this Congress, and includes members from vacancies and newly admitted states, when they were first seated. Changes resulting from subsequent replacements are shown below in the "Changes in membership" section.

=== Senate ===
	Party (shading shows control)			Total	Vacant
	Democratic (D)	Farmer– Labor (FL)	Republican (R)	Total	Vacant
End of previous congress	42	2	52	96	0
Begin	40	1	55	96	0
End	42	1	52	95	1
Final voting share	44.2%	1.1%	54.7%		
Beginning of next congress	47	1	46	94	2

=== House of Representatives ===
	Party (shading shows control)				Total	Vacant
	Democratic (D)	Farmer– Labor (FL)	Socialist (Soc.)	Republican (R)	Total	Vacant
End of previous congress	208	2	1	222	433	2
Begin	183	3	2	246	434	1
End	182	3	2	246	433	2
Final voting share	42.0%	0.7%	0.5%	56.8%		
Beginning of next congress	194	2	1	237	434	1

== Leadership ==
=== Senate ===
Senate President

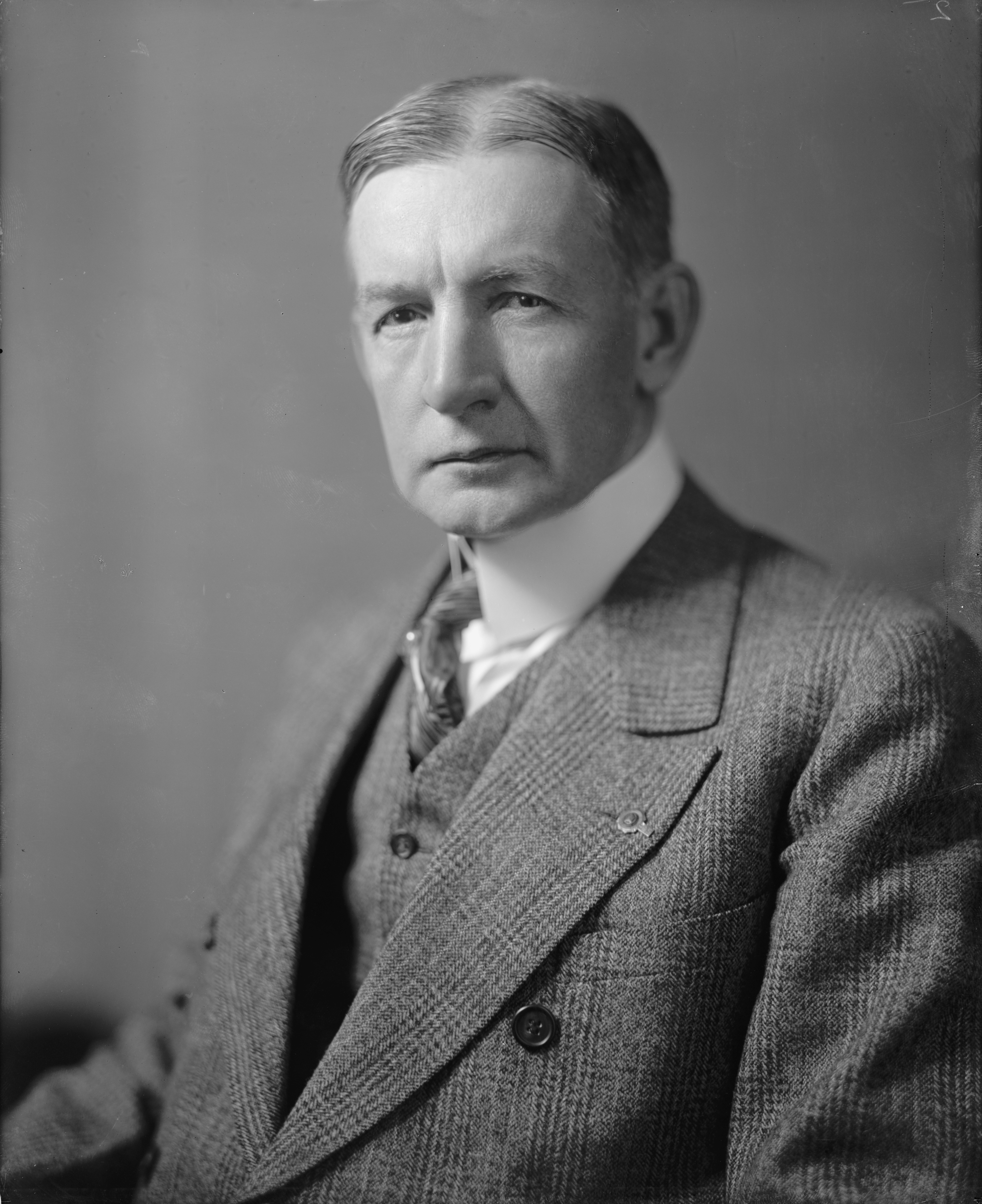
Senate President
Charles G. Dawes (R)

Senate Presidents pro tempore

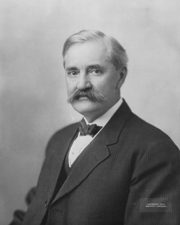
Senate President pro tempore
Albert B. Cummins (R), until March 6, 1925

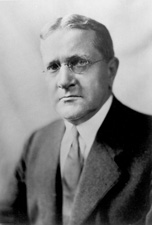
Senate President pro tempore
George H. Moses (R), from March 6, 1925

- President: Charles G. Dawes (R)
- President pro tempore: Albert B. Cummins (R), elected March 4, 1925
  - George H. Moses (R), elected March 6, 1925

==== Majority (Republican) leadership ====
- Majority Leader: Charles Curtis
- Majority Whip: Wesley L. Jones
- Republican Conference Secretary: James Wolcott Wadsworth Jr.
- National Senatorial Committee Chair: Lawrence C. Phipps

==== Minority (Democratic) leadership ====
- Minority Leader: Joseph T. Robinson
- Minority Whip: Peter G. Gerry
- Democratic Caucus Secretary: William H. King

=== House of Representatives ===
House leadership

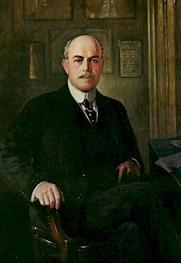
House Speaker
Nicholas Longworth (R)

- Speaker: Nicholas Longworth (R)

==== Majority (Republican) leadership ====
- Majority Leader: John Q. Tilson
- Majority Whip: Albert H. Vestal
- Republican Conference Chairman: Willis C. Hawley
- Republican Campaign Committee Chairman: William R. Wood

==== Minority (Democratic) leadership ====
- Minority Leader: Finis J. Garrett
- Minority Whip: William Allan Oldfield
- Democratic Caucus Chairman: Charles D. Carter

== Members ==
This list is arranged by chamber, then by state. Senators are listed by class, and representatives by district.

=== Senate ===
Senators were elected every two years, with one-third beginning new six-year terms with each Congress. Preceding the names in the list below are Senate class numbers, which indicate the cycle of their election. In this Congress, Class 1 meant their term began in the last Congress, facing re-election in 1928; Class 2 meant their term began with this Congress, facing re-election in 1930; and Class 3 meant their term ended with this Congress, facing re-election in 1926.

==== Alabama ====
▌2. J. Thomas Heflin (D)
▌3. Oscar Underwood (D)

==== Arizona ====
▌1. Henry F. Ashurst (D)
▌3. Ralph H. Cameron (R)

==== Arkansas ====
▌2. Joseph Taylor Robinson (D)
▌3. Thaddeus H. Caraway (D)

==== California ====
▌1. Hiram W. Johnson (R)
▌3. Samuel M. Shortridge (R)

==== Colorado ====
▌2. Lawrence C. Phipps (R)
▌3. Rice W. Means (R)

==== Connecticut ====
▌1. George P. McLean (R)
▌3. Hiram Bingham III (R)

==== Delaware ====
▌1. Thomas F. Bayard Jr. (D)
▌2. T. Coleman du Pont (R)

==== Florida ====
▌1. Park Trammell (D)
▌3. Duncan U. Fletcher (D)

==== Georgia ====
▌2. William J. Harris (D)
▌3. Walter F. George (D)

==== Idaho ====
▌2. William E. Borah (R)
▌3. Frank R. Gooding (R)

==== Illinois ====
▌2. Charles S. Deneen (R)
▌3. William B. McKinley (R), until December 7, 1926

==== Indiana ====
▌1. Samuel M. Ralston (D), until October 14, 1925

▌Arthur R. Robinson (R), from October 20, 1925

▌3. James E. Watson (R)

==== Iowa ====
▌2. Smith W. Brookhart (R), until April 12, 1926

▌Daniel F. Steck (D), from April 12, 1926

▌3. Albert B. Cummins (R), until July 30, 1926

▌David W. Stewart (R), from August 7, 1926

==== Kansas ====
▌2. Arthur Capper (R)
▌3. Charles Curtis (R)

==== Kentucky ====
▌2. Frederic M. Sackett (R)
▌3. Richard P. Ernst (R)

==== Louisiana ====
▌2. Joseph E. Ransdell (D)
▌3. Edwin S. Broussard (D)

==== Maine ====
▌1. Frederick Hale (R)
▌2. Bert M. Fernald (R), until August 23, 1926

▌Arthur R. Gould (R), from November 30, 1926

==== Maryland ====
▌1. William Cabell Bruce (D)
▌3. Ovington E. Weller (R)

==== Massachusetts ====
▌1. William M. Butler (R), until December 6, 1926

▌David I. Walsh (D), from December 6, 1926

▌2. Frederick H. Gillett (R)

==== Michigan ====
▌1. Woodbridge N. Ferris (D)
▌2. James J. Couzens (R)

==== Minnesota ====
▌1. Henrik Shipstead (FL)
▌2. Thomas D. Schall (R)

==== Mississippi ====
▌1. Hubert D. Stephens (D)
▌2. Pat Harrison (D)

==== Missouri ====
▌1. James A. Reed (D)
▌3. Selden P. Spencer (R), until May 16, 1925

▌George H. Williams (R), May 25, 1925 – December 6, 1926
▌Harry B. Hawes (D), from December 6, 1926

==== Montana ====
▌1. Burton K. Wheeler (D)
▌2. Thomas J. Walsh (D)

==== Nebraska ====
▌1. Robert B. Howell (R)
▌2. George W. Norris (R)

==== Nevada ====
▌1. Key Pittman (D)
▌3. Tasker Oddie (R)

==== New Hampshire ====
▌2. Henry W. Keyes (R)
▌3. George H. Moses (R)

==== New Jersey ====
▌1. Edward I. Edwards (D)
▌2. Walter E. Edge (R)

==== New Mexico ====
▌1. Andrieus A. Jones (D)
▌2. Sam G. Bratton (D)

==== New York ====
▌1. Royal S. Copeland (D)
▌3. James W. Wadsworth Jr. (R)

==== North Carolina ====
▌2. Furnifold M. Simmons (D)
▌3. Lee S. Overman (D)

==== North Dakota ====
▌1. Lynn Frazier (R-NPL)
▌3. Edwin F. Ladd (R), until June 22, 1925

▌Gerald Nye (R), from November 14, 1925

==== Ohio ====
▌1. Simeon D. Fess (R)
▌3. Frank B. Willis (R)

==== Oklahoma ====
▌2. William B. Pine (R)
▌3. John W. Harreld (R)

==== Oregon ====
▌2. Charles L. McNary (R)
▌3. Robert N. Stanfield (R)

==== Pennsylvania ====
▌1. David A. Reed (R)
▌3. George Wharton Pepper (R)

==== Rhode Island ====
▌1. Peter G. Gerry (D)
▌2. Jesse H. Metcalf (R)

==== South Carolina ====
▌2. Coleman L. Blease (D)
▌3. Ellison D. Smith (D)

==== South Dakota ====
▌2. William H. McMaster (R)
▌3. Peter Norbeck (R)

==== Tennessee ====
▌1. Kenneth McKellar (D)
▌2. Lawrence Tyson (D)

==== Texas ====
▌1. Earle B. Mayfield (D)
▌2. Morris Sheppard (D)

==== Utah ====
▌1. William H. King (D)
▌3. Reed Smoot (R)

==== Vermont ====
▌1. Frank L. Greene (R)
▌3. Porter H. Dale (R)

==== Virginia ====
▌1. Claude A. Swanson (D)
▌2. Carter Glass (D)

==== Washington ====
▌1. Clarence Cleveland Dill (D)
▌3. Wesley L. Jones (R)

==== West Virginia ====
▌1. Matthew M. Neely (D)
▌2. Guy D. Goff (R)

==== Wisconsin ====
▌1. Robert M. La Follette Sr. (R), until June 18, 1925

▌Robert M. La Follette Jr. (R), from September 30, 1925

▌3. Irvine Lenroot (R)

==== Wyoming ====
▌1. John B. Kendrick (D)
▌2. Francis E. Warren (R)

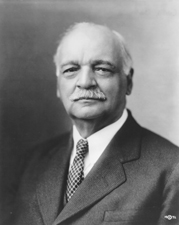
Senate Majority Leader Charles Curtis (R)

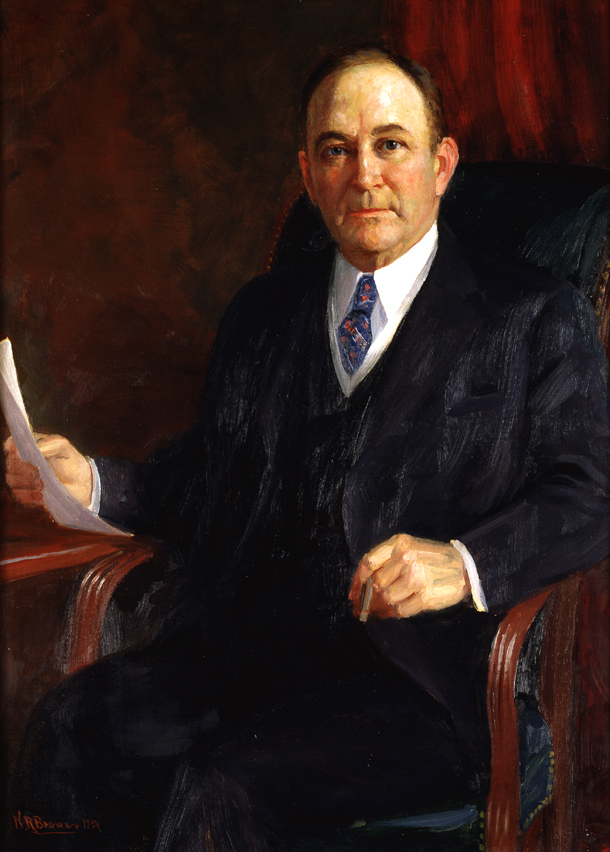
Senate Minority Leader Joseph Robinson (D)

=== House of Representatives ===
==== Alabama ====
▌1. John McDuffie (D)
▌2. J. Lister Hill (D)
▌3. Henry B. Steagall (D)
▌4. Lamar Jeffers (D)
▌5. William B. Bowling (D)
▌6. William B. Oliver (D)
▌7. Miles C. Allgood (D)
▌8. Edward B. Almon (D)
▌9. George Huddleston (D)
▌10. William B. Bankhead (D)

==== Arizona ====
▌At-large. Carl Hayden (D)

==== Arkansas ====
▌1. William J. Driver (D)
▌2. William A. Oldfield (D)
▌3. John N. Tillman (D)
▌4. Otis Wingo (D)
▌5. Heartsill Ragon (D)
▌6. James B. Reed (D)
▌7. Tilman B. Parks (D)

==== California ====
▌1. Clarence F. Lea (D)
▌2. John E. Raker (D), until January 22, 1926

▌Harry L. Englebright (R), from August 31, 1926

▌3. Charles F. Curry (R)
▌4. Florence P. Kahn (R)
▌5. Lawrence J. Flaherty (R), until June 13, 1926

▌Richard J. Welch (R), from August 31, 1926

▌6. Albert E. Carter (R)
▌7. Henry E. Barbour (R)
▌8. Arthur M. Free (R)
▌9. Walter F. Lineberger (R)
▌10. John D. Fredericks (R)
▌11. Philip D. Swing (R)

==== Colorado ====
▌1. William N. Vaile (R)
▌2. Charles Bateman Timberlake (R)
▌3. Guy U. Hardy (R)
▌4. Edward T. Taylor (D)

==== Connecticut ====
▌1. E. Hart Fenn (R)
▌2. Richard P. Freeman (R)
▌3. John Q. Tilson (R)
▌4. Schuyler Merritt (R)
▌5. James P. Glynn (R)

==== Delaware ====
▌At-large. Robert G. Houston (R)

==== Florida ====
▌1. Herbert J. Drane (D)
▌2. Robert A. Green (D)
▌3. John H. Smithwick (D)
▌4. William J. Sears (D)

==== Georgia ====
▌1. Charles G. Edwards (D)
▌2. Edward E. Cox (D)
▌3. Charles R. Crisp (D)
▌4. William C. Wright (D)
▌5. William D. Upshaw (D)
▌6. Samuel Rutherford (D)
▌7. Gordon Lee (D)
▌8. Charles H. Brand (D)
▌9. Thomas Montgomery Bell (D)
▌10. Carl Vinson (D)
▌11. William C. Lankford (D)
▌12. William W. Larsen (D)

==== Idaho ====
▌1. Burton L. French (R)
▌2. Addison T. Smith (R)

==== Illinois ====
▌1. Martin B. Madden (R)
▌2. Morton D. Hull (R)
▌3. Elliott W. Sproul (R)
▌4. Thomas A. Doyle (D)
▌5. Adolph J. Sabath (D)
▌6. John J. Gorman (R)
▌7. M. Alfred Michaelson (R)
▌8. Stanley H. Kunz (D)
▌9. Frederick A. Britten (R)
▌10. Carl R. Chindblom (R)
▌11. Frank R. Reid (R)
▌12. Charles Eugene Fuller (R), until June 25, 1926
▌13. William R. Johnson (R)
▌14. John C. Allen (R)
▌15. Edward John King (R)
▌16. William E. Hull (R)
▌17. Frank H. Funk (R)
▌18. William P. Holaday (R)
▌19. Charles Adkins (R)
▌20. Henry T. Rainey (D)
▌21. Loren E. Wheeler (R)
▌22. Edward M. Irwin (R)
▌23. William W. Arnold (D)
▌24. Thomas S. Williams (R)
▌25. Edward E. Denison (R)
▌At-large. Henry R. Rathbone (R)
▌At-large. Richard Yates Jr. (R)

==== Indiana ====
▌1. Harry E. Rowbottom (R)
▌2. Arthur H. Greenwood (D)
▌3. Frank Gardner (D)
▌4. Harry C. Canfield (D)
▌5. Noble J. Johnson (R)
▌6. Richard N. Elliott (R)
▌7. Ralph E. Updike (R)
▌8. Albert H. Vestal (R)
▌9. Fred S. Purnell (R)
▌10. William R. Wood (R)
▌11. Albert R. Hall (R)
▌12. David Hogg (R)
▌13. Andrew J. Hickey (R)

==== Iowa ====
▌1. William F. Kopp (R)
▌2. F. Dickinson Letts (R)
▌3. Thomas J. B. Robinson (R)
▌4. Gilbert N. Haugen (R)
▌5. Cyrenus Cole (R)
▌6. C. William Ramseyer (R)
▌7. Cassius C. Dowell (R)
▌8. Lloyd Thurston (R)
▌9. William R. Green (R)
▌10. Lester J. Dickinson (R)
▌11. William D. Boies (R)

==== Kansas ====
▌1. Daniel Read Anthony Jr. (R)
▌2. Chauncey B. Little (D)
▌3. William H. Sproul (R)
▌4. Homer Hoch (R)
▌5. James G. Strong (R)
▌6. Hays B. White (R)
▌7. Jasper N. Tincher (R)
▌8. William A. Ayres (D)

==== Kentucky ====
▌1. Alben Barkley (D)
▌2. David Hayes Kincheloe (D)
▌3. Robert Y. Thomas Jr. (D), until September 3, 1925

▌John W. Moore (D), from December 26, 1925

▌4. Ben Johnson (D)
▌5. Maurice H. Thatcher (R)
▌6. Arthur B. Rouse (D)
▌7. Virgil Chapman (D)
▌8. Ralph W. E. Gilbert (D)
▌9. Fred M. Vinson (D)
▌10. John W. Langley (R), until January 11, 1926

▌Andrew J. Kirk (R), from February 13, 1926

▌11. John M. Robsion (R)

==== Louisiana ====
▌1. James O'Connor (D)
▌2. J. Zach Spearing (D)
▌3. Whitmell P. Martin (D)
▌4. John N. Sandlin (D)
▌5. Riley Joseph Wilson (D)
▌6. Bolivar E. Kemp (D)
▌7. Ladislas Lazaro (D)
▌8. James Benjamin Aswell (D)

==== Maine ====
▌1. Carroll L. Beedy (R)
▌2. Wallace H. White Jr. (R)
▌3. John E. Nelson (R)
▌4. Ira G. Hersey (R)

==== Maryland ====
▌1. T. Alan Goldsborough (D)
▌2. Millard Tydings (D)
▌3. John Philip Hill (R)
▌4. J. Charles Linthicum (D)
▌5. Stephen W. Gambrill (D)
▌6. Frederick N. Zihlman (R)

==== Massachusetts ====
▌1. Allen T. Treadway (R)
▌2. George B. Churchill (R), until July 1, 1925

▌Henry L. Bowles (R), from September 29, 1925

▌3. Frank H. Foss (R)
▌4. George R. Stobbs (R)
▌5. John J. Rogers (R), until March 28, 1925

▌Edith Nourse Rogers (R), from June 30, 1925

▌6. A. Piatt Andrew Jr. (R)
▌7. William P. Connery Jr. (D)
▌8. Harry I. Thayer (R), until March 10, 1926

▌Frederick W. Dallinger (R), from November 2, 1926

▌9. Charles L. Underhill (R)
▌10. John J. Douglass (D)
▌11. George Holden Tinkham (R)
▌12. James A. Gallivan (D)
▌13. Robert Luce (R)
▌14. Louis A. Frothingham (R)
▌15. Joseph W. Martin Jr. (R)
▌16. Charles L. Gifford (R)

==== Michigan ====
▌1. John B. Sosnowski (R)
▌2. Earl C. Michener (R)
▌3. Arthur B. Williams (R), until May 1, 1925

▌Joseph L. Hooper (R), from August 18, 1925

▌4. John C. Ketcham (R)
▌5. Carl Mapes (R)
▌6. Grant M. Hudson (R)
▌7. Louis C. Cramton (R)
▌8. Bird J. Vincent (R)
▌9. James C. McLaughlin (R)
▌10. Roy O. Woodruff (R)
▌11. Frank D. Scott (R)
▌12. W. Frank James (R)
▌13. Clarence J. McLeod (R)

==== Minnesota ====
▌1. Allen J. Furlow (R)
▌2. Frank Clague (R)
▌3. August H. Andresen (R)
▌4. Oscar E. Keller (R)
▌5. Walter H. Newton (R)
▌6. Harold Knutson (R)
▌7. Ole J. Kvale (FL)
▌8. William L. Carss (FL)
▌9. Knud Wefald (FL)
▌10. Godfrey G. Goodwin (R)

==== Mississippi ====
▌1. John E. Rankin (D)
▌2. Bill G. Lowrey (D)
▌3. William M. Whittington (D)
▌4. T. Jefferson Busby (D)
▌5. Ross A. Collins (D)
▌6. T. Webber Wilson (D)
▌7. Percy E. Quin (D)
▌8. James W. Collier (D)

==== Missouri ====
▌1. Milton A. Romjue (D)
▌2. Ralph F. Lozier (D)
▌3. Jacob L. Milligan (D)
▌4. Charles L. Faust (R)
▌5. Edgar C. Ellis (R)
▌6. Clement C. Dickinson (D)
▌7. Samuel C. Major (D)
▌8. William L. Nelson (D)
▌9. Clarence Cannon (D)
▌10. Cleveland A. Newton (R)
▌11. Harry B. Hawes (D), until October 15, 1926

▌John J. Cochran (D), from November 2, 1926

▌12. Leonidas C. Dyer (R)
▌13. Charles E. Kiefner (R)
▌14. Ralph E. Bailey (R)
▌15. Joe J. Manlove (R)
▌16. Thomas L. Rubey (D)

==== Montana ====
▌1. John M. Evans (D)
▌2. Scott Leavitt (R)

==== Nebraska ====
▌1. John H. Morehead (D)
▌2. Willis G. Sears (R)
▌3. Edgar Howard (D)
▌4. Melvin O. McLaughlin (R)
▌5. Ashton C. Shallenberger (D)
▌6. Robert G. Simmons (R)

==== Nevada ====
▌At-large. Samuel S. Arentz (R)

==== New Hampshire ====
▌1. Fletcher Hale (R)
▌2. Edward Hills Wason (R)

==== New Jersey ====
▌1. Francis F. Patterson Jr. (R)
▌2. Isaac Bacharach (R)
▌3. Stewart H. Appleby (R), from November 3, 1925
▌4. Charles A. Eaton (R)
▌5. Ernest R. Ackerman (R)
▌6. Randolph Perkins (R)
▌7. George N. Seger (R)
▌8. Herbert W. Taylor (R)
▌9. Franklin W. Fort (R)
▌10. Frederick R. Lehlbach (R)
▌11. Oscar L. Auf der Heide (D)
▌12. Mary T. Norton (D)

==== New Mexico ====
▌At-large. John Morrow (D)

==== New York ====
▌1. Robert L. Bacon (R)
▌2. John J. Kindred (D)
▌3. George W. Lindsay (D)
▌4. Thomas H. Cullen (D)
▌5. Loring M. Black Jr. (D)
▌6. Andrew L. Somers (D)
▌7. John Quayle (D)
▌8. William E. Cleary (D)
▌9. David J. O'Connell (D)
▌10. Emanuel Celler (D)
▌11. Anning S. Prall (D)
▌12. Samuel Dickstein (D)
▌13. Christopher D. Sullivan (D)
▌14. Nathan D. Perlman (R)
▌15. John J. Boylan (D)
▌16. John J. O'Connor (D)
▌17. Ogden L. Mills (R)
▌18. John F. Carew (D)
▌19. Sol Bloom (D)
▌20. Fiorello H. LaGuardia (S)
▌21. Royal H. Weller (D)
▌22. Anthony J. Griffin (D)
▌23. Frank Oliver (D)
▌24. Benjamin L. Fairchild (R)
▌25. J. Mayhew Wainwright (R)
▌26. Hamilton Fish III (R)
▌27. Harcourt J. Pratt (R)
▌28. Parker Corning (D)
▌29. James S. Parker (R)
▌30. Frank Crowther (R)
▌31. Bertrand H. Snell (R)
▌32. Thaddeus C. Sweet (R)
▌33. Frederick M. Davenport (R)
▌34. Harold S. Tolley (R)
▌35. Walter W. Magee (R)
▌36. John Taber (R)
▌37. Gale H. Stalker (R)
▌38. Meyer Jacobstein (D)
▌39. Archie D. Sanders (R)
▌40. S. Wallace Dempsey (R)
▌41. Clarence MacGregor (R)
▌42. James M. Mead (D)
▌43. Daniel A. Reed (R)

==== North Carolina ====
▌1. Lindsay C. Warren (D)
▌2. John H. Kerr (D)
▌3. Charles L. Abernethy (D)
▌4. Edward W. Pou (D)
▌5. Charles M. Stedman (D)
▌6. Homer L. Lyon (D)
▌7. William C. Hammer (D)
▌8. Robert L. Doughton (D)
▌9. Alfred L. Bulwinkle (D)
▌10. Zebulon Weaver (D)

==== North Dakota ====
▌1. Olger B. Burtness (R)
▌2. Thomas Hall (R)
▌3. James H. Sinclair (R)

==== Ohio ====
▌1. Nicholas Longworth (R)
▌2. Ambrose E. B. Stephens (R), until February 12, 1927
▌3. Roy G. Fitzgerald (R)
▌4. William T. Fitzgerald (R)
▌5. Charles J. Thompson (R)
▌6. Charles C. Kearns (R)
▌7. Charles Brand (R)
▌8. Thomas B. Fletcher (D)
▌9. William W. Chalmers (R)
▌10. Thomas A. Jenkins (R)
▌11. Mell G. Underwood (D)
▌12. John C. Speaks (R)
▌13. James T. Begg (R)
▌14. Martin L. Davey (D)
▌15. C. Ellis Moore (R)
▌16. John McSweeney (D)
▌17. William M. Morgan (R)
▌18. B. Frank Murphy (R)
▌19. John G. Cooper (R)
▌20. Charles A. Mooney (D)
▌21. Robert Crosser (D)
▌22. Theodore E. Burton (R)

==== Oklahoma ====
▌1. Samuel J. Montgomery (R)
▌2. William W. Hastings (D)
▌3. Charles D. Carter (D)
▌4. Tom D. McKeown (D)
▌5. Fletcher B. Swank (D)
▌6. Elmer Thomas (D)
▌7. James V. McClintic (D)
▌8. Milton C. Garber (R)

==== Oregon ====
▌1. Willis C. Hawley (R)
▌2. Nicholas J. Sinnott (R)
▌3. Maurice E. Crumpacker (R)

==== Pennsylvania ====
▌1. William S. Vare (R)
▌2. George S. Graham (R)
▌3. Harry C. Ransley (R)
▌4. Benjamin M. Golder (R)
▌5. James J. Connolly (R)
▌6. George A. Welsh (R)
▌7. George P. Darrow (R)
▌8. Thomas S. Butler (R)
▌9. Henry Winfield Watson (R)
▌10. William W. Griest (R)
▌11. Laurence H. Watres (R)
▌12. Edmund N. Carpenter (R)
▌13. George F. Brumm (R)
▌14. Charles J. Esterly (R)
▌15. Louis T. McFadden (R)
▌16. Edgar R. Kiess (R)
▌17. Frederick W. Magrady (R)
▌18. Edward M. Beers (R)
▌19. Joshua W. Swartz (R)
▌20. Anderson H. Walters (R)
▌21. J. Banks Kurtz (R)
▌22. Franklin Menges (R)
▌23. William I. Swoope (R)
▌24. Samuel A. Kendall (R)
▌25. Henry W. Temple (R)
▌26. Thomas W. Phillips Jr. (R)
▌27. Nathan L. Strong (R)
▌28. Harris J. Bixler (R)
▌29. Milton W. Shreve (R)
▌30. William R. Coyle (R)
▌31. Adam M. Wyant (R)
▌32. Stephen G. Porter (R)
▌33. M. Clyde Kelly (R)
▌34. John M. Morin (R)
▌35. James M. Magee (R)
▌36. Guy E. Campbell (R)

==== Rhode Island ====
▌1. Clark Burdick (R)
▌2. Richard S. Aldrich (R)
▌3. Jeremiah E. O'Connell (D)

==== South Carolina ====
▌1. Thomas S. McMillan (D)
▌2. Butler B. Hare (D)
▌3. Fred H. Dominick (D)
▌4. John J. McSwain (D)
▌5. William F. Stevenson (D)
▌6. Allard H. Gasque (D)
▌7. Hampton P. Fulmer (D)

==== South Dakota ====
▌1. Charles A. Christopherson (R)
▌2. Royal C. Johnson (R)
▌3. William Williamson (R)

==== Tennessee ====
▌1. B. Carroll Reece (R)
▌2. J. Will Taylor (R)
▌3. Samuel D. McReynolds (D)
▌4. Cordell Hull (D)
▌5. Ewin L. Davis (D)
▌6. Joseph W. Byrns (D)
▌7. Edward E. Eslick (D)
▌8. Gordon Browning (D)
▌9. Finis J. Garrett (D)
▌10. Hubert Fisher (D)

==== Texas ====
▌1. Eugene Black (D)
▌2. John C. Box (D)
▌3. Morgan G. Sanders (D)
▌4. Sam Rayburn (D)
▌5. Hatton W. Sumners (D)
▌6. Luther Alexander Johnson (D)
▌7. Clay Stone Briggs (D)
▌8. Daniel E. Garrett (D)
▌9. Joseph J. Mansfield (D)
▌10. James P. Buchanan (D)
▌11. Tom T. Connally (D)
▌12. Fritz G. Lanham (D)
▌13. Guinn Williams (D)
▌14. Harry M. Wurzbach (R)
▌15. John Nance Garner (D)
▌16. Claude B. Hudspeth (D)
▌17. Thomas L. Blanton (D)
▌18. John Marvin Jones (D)

==== Utah ====
▌1. Don B. Colton (R)
▌2. Elmer O. Leatherwood (R)

==== Vermont ====
▌1. Elbert S. Brigham (R)
▌2. Ernest Willard Gibson (R)

==== Virginia ====
▌1. S. Otis Bland (D)
▌2. Joseph T. Deal (D)
▌3. Andrew Jackson Montague (D)
▌4. Patrick H. Drewry (D)
▌5. Joseph Whitehead (D)
▌6. Clifton A. Woodrum (D)
▌7. Thomas W. Harrison (D)
▌8. R. Walton Moore (D)
▌9. George C. Peery (D)
▌10. Henry St. George Tucker III (D)

==== Washington ====
▌1. John F. Miller (R)
▌2. Lindley H. Hadley (R)
▌3. Albert Johnson (R)
▌4. John W. Summers (R)
▌5. Samuel B. Hill (D)

==== West Virginia ====
▌1. Carl G. Bachmann (R)
▌2. Frank L. Bowman (R)
▌3. John M. Wolverton (R)
▌4. Harry C. Woodyard (R)
▌5. James F. Strother (R)
▌6. J. Alfred Taylor (D)

==== Wisconsin ====
▌1. Henry Allen Cooper (R)
▌2. Edward Voigt (R)
▌3. John M. Nelson (R)
▌4. John C. Schafer (R)
▌5. Victor L. Berger (S)
▌6. Florian Lampert (R)
▌7. Joseph D. Beck (R)
▌8. Edward E. Browne (R)
▌9. George J. Schneider (R)
▌10. James A. Frear (R)
▌11. Hubert H. Peavey (R)

==== Wyoming ====
▌At-large. Charles E. Winter (R)

==== Non-voting members ====
▌Alaska Territory. Daniel Sutherland (R)
▌Hawaii Territory. William P. Jarrett (D)
▌Philippines. Isauro Gabaldón (Nac.)
▌Philippines. Pedro Guevara (Nac.)
▌Puerto Rico. Félix Córdova Dávila (UPR)

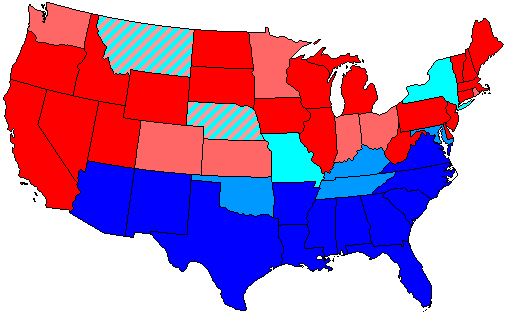
House seats by party holding plurality in state: 80+% to 100% Democratic / 80+% to 100% Republican; 60+% to 80% Democratic / 60+% to 80% Republican; Up to 60% Democratic / Up to 60% Republican

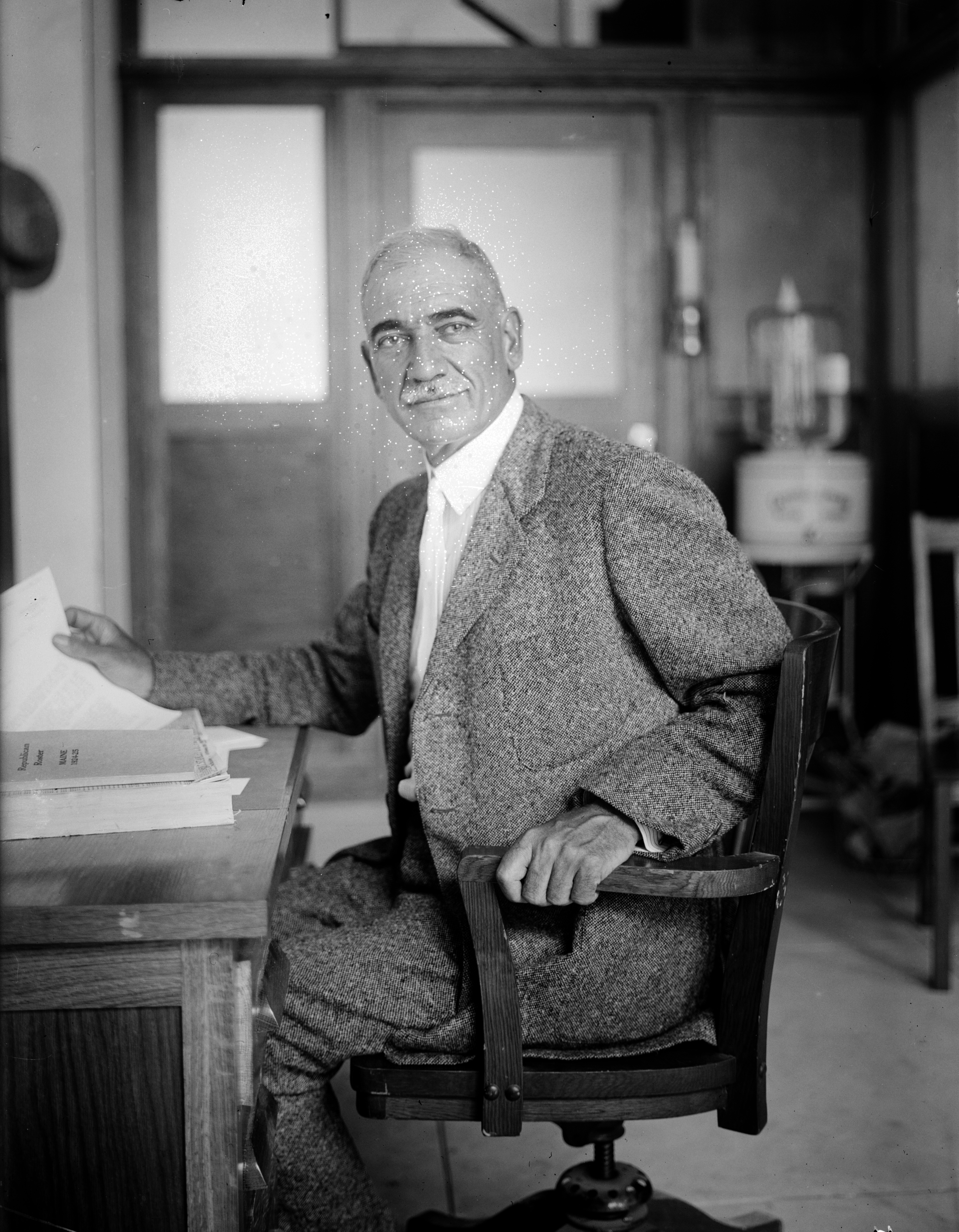
House Majority Leader John Tilson (R)

== Changes in membership ==
The count below reflects changes from the beginning of the first session of this Congress.

=== Senate ===
- Replacements: 10
  - Democratic: 2 net gain
  - Republican: 3 net loss
- Deaths: 7
- Resignations: 0
- Contested election: 1
- Interim appointments: 2
- Total seats with changes: 9

State	Senator	Reason for vacancy	Successor	Date of successor's installation
Missouri (3)	Selden P. Spencer (R)	Died May 16, 1925. Successor was appointed.	George H. Williams (R)	May 25, 1925
Wisconsin (1)	Robert M. La Follette (R)	Died June 18, 1925. Successor was elected.	Robert M. La Follette Jr. (R)	September 30, 1925
North Dakota (3)	Edwin F. Ladd (R)	Died June 22, 1925. Successor was appointed and subsequently elected	Gerald Nye (R)	November 14, 1925
Indiana (1)	Samuel M. Ralston (D)	Died October 14, 1925. Successor was appointed and subsequently elected.	Arthur R. Robinson (R)	October 20, 1925
Iowa (2)	Smith W. Brookhart (R)	Lost election challenge April 12, 1926	Daniel F. Steck (D)	April 12, 1926
Iowa (3)	Albert B. Cummins (R)	Died July 30, 1926. Successor was appointed and subsequently elected.	David W. Stewart (R)	August 7, 1926
Maine (2)	Bert M. Fernald (R)	Died August 23, 1926. Successor was elected.	Arthur R. Gould (R)	November 30, 1926
Massachusetts (1)	William M. Butler (R)	Appointed in previous Congress and served until successor was elected.	David I. Walsh (D)	December 6, 1926
Missouri (3)	George H. Williams (R)	Successor was elected.	Harry B. Hawes (D)	December 6, 1926
Illinois (3)	William B. McKinley (R)	Died December 7, 1926. Frank L. Smith was appointed by the governor some date in December 1926 but the US Senate voted to not allow him to qualify as a senator, based upon fraud and corruption in his campaign.	Vacant	

=== House of Representatives ===
- Replacements: 9
  - Democratic: 1 seat net loss
  - Republican: 1 seat net gain
- Deaths: 9
- Resignations: 2
- Total seats with changes: 12

District	Vacated by	Reason for vacancy	Successor	Date of successor's installation
New Jersey 3rd	Vacant	Rep. T. Frank Appleby died during previous congress	Stewart H. Appleby (R)	November 3, 1925
Massachusetts 5th	John J. Rogers (R)	Died March 28, 1925	Edith Nourse Rogers (R)	June 30, 1925
Michigan 3rd	Arthur B. Williams (R)	Died May 1, 1925	Joseph L. Hooper (R)	August 18, 1925
Massachusetts 2nd	George B. Churchill (R)	Died July 1, 1925	Henry L. Bowles (R)	September 29, 1925
Kentucky 3rd	Robert Y. Thomas Jr. (D)	Died September 3, 1925	John W. Moore (D)	December 26, 1925
California 2nd	John E. Raker (D)	Died January 22, 1926	Harry L. Englebright (R)	August 31, 1926
Massachusetts 8th	Harry I. Thayer (R)	Died March 10, 1926	Frederick W. Dallinger (R)	November 2, 1926
California 5th	Lawrence J. Flaherty (R)	Died June 13, 1926	Richard J. Welch (R)	August 31, 1926
Illinois 12th	Charles E. Fuller (R)	Died June 25, 1926	Seat remained vacant until next Congress	
Kentucky 10th	John W. Langley (R)	Resigned January 11, 1926, after being convicted of illegally selling alcohol	Andrew J. Kirk (R)	February 13, 1926
Missouri 11th	Harry B. Hawes (D)	Resigned October 15, 1926	John J. Cochran (D)	November 2, 1926
Ohio 2nd	Ambrose E. B. Stephens (R)	Died February 12, 1927	Seat remained vacant until next Congress	

== Committees ==
Lists of committees and their party leaders for members of the House and Senate committees can be found through the Official Congressional Directory at the bottom of this article. The directory after the pages of terms of service lists committees of the Senate, House (Standing with Subcommittees, Select and Special) and Joint and, after that, House/Senate committee assignments. On the committees section of the House and Senate in the Official Congressional Directory, the committee's members on the first row on the left side shows the chairman of the committee and on the right side shows the ranking member of the committee.

=== Senate ===
- Agriculture and Forestry (Chairman: George W. Norris; Ranking Member: Ellison D. Smith)
- Alien Property Custodian's Office (Select)
- Appropriations (Chairman: Francis E. Warren; Ranking Member: Lee S. Overman)
- Audit and Control the Contingent Expenses of the Senate (Chairman: Henry W. Keyes; Ranking Member: Kenneth McKellar)
- Banking and Currency (Chairman: George P. McLean; Ranking Member: Duncan U. Fletcher)
- Civil Service (Chairman: James Couzens then Porter H. Dale; Ranking Member: Kenneth McKellar)
- Claims (Chairman: Rice W. Means; Ranking Member: Park Trammell)
- Commerce (Chairman: Wesley L. Jones; Ranking Member: Duncan U. Fletcher)
- District of Columbia (Chairman: Arthur Capper; Ranking Member: William H. King)
- Education and Labor (Chairman: Lawrence C. Phipps; Ranking Member: Andrieus A. Jones)
- Enrolled Bills (Chairman: Frank L. Greene; Ranking Member: Coleman L. Blease)
- Expenditures in Executive Departments (Chairman: David A. Reed; Ranking Member: Oscar W. Underwood)
- Finance (Chairman: Reed Smoot; Ranking Member: Furnifold M. Simmons)
- Foreign Relations (Chairman: William E. Borah; Ranking Member: Claude Swanson)
- Immigration (Chairman: Hiram W. Johnson; Ranking Member: William H. King)
- Indian Affairs (Chairman: John W. Harreld; Ranking Member: Henry F. Ashurst)
- Internal Revenue Bureau (Select)
- Interoceanic Canals (Chairman: Walter Evans Edge; Ranking Member: Thomas J. Walsh)
- Interstate Commerce (Chairman: James Eli Watson; Ranking Member: Ellison D. Smith)
- Irrigation and Reclamation (Chairman: Charles L. McNary; Ranking Member: Morris Sheppard)
- Judiciary (Chairman: Albert B. Cummins; Ranking Member: Lee S. Overman)
- Library (Chairman: Simeon D. Fess; Ranking Member: Kenneth McKellar)
- Manufactures (Chairman: William B. McKinley; Ranking Member: Ellison D. Smith)
- Military Affairs (Chairman: James W. Wadsworth Jr.; Ranking Member: Duncan U. Fletcher)
- Mines and Mining (Chairman: Tasker L. Oddie; Ranking Member: Thomas J. Walsh)
- Naval Affairs (Chairman: Frederick Hale; Ranking Member: Claude A. Swanson)
- Patents (Chairman: William M. Butler; Ranking Member: Ellison D. Smith)
- Pensions (Chairman: Peter Norbeck; Ranking Member: Peter G. Gerry)
- Post Office and Post Roads (Chairman: George H. Moses; Ranking Member: Kenneth McKellar)
- Printing (Chairman: George W. Pepper; Ranking Member: Duncan U. Fletcher)
- Privileges and Elections (Chairman: Richard P. Ernst; Ranking Member: William H. King)
- Public Buildings and Grounds (Chairman: Bert M. Fernald; Ranking Member: James A. Reed)
- Public Lands and Surveys (Chairman: Robert Nelson Stanfield; Ranking Member: Key Pittman)
- Rules (Chairman: Charles Curtis; Ranking Member: Lee S. Overman)
- Senatorial Elections (Select)
- Tariff Commission (Select)
- Territories and Insular Possessions (Chairman: Frank B. Willis; Ranking Member: Key Pittman)
- War Finance Corporation Loans (Select)
- Whole

=== House of Representatives ===
- Accounts (Chairman: Clarence MacGregor; Ranking Member: Ralph Waldo Emerson Gilbert)
- Agriculture (Chairman: Gilbert N. Haugen; Ranking Member: James B. Aswell)
- Alcoholic Liquor Traffic (Chairman: Grant M. Hudson; Ranking Member: William D. Upshaw)
- Appropriations (Chairman: Martin B. Madden; Ranking Member: Joseph W. Byrns)
- Banking and Currency (Chairman: Louis T. McFadden; Ranking Member: Otis Wingo)
- Census (Chairman: E. Hart Fenn; Ranking Member: John E. Rankin)
- Civil Service (Chairman: Frederick R. Lehlbach; Ranking Member: Lamar Jeffers)
- Claims (Chairman: Charles L. Underhill; Ranking Member: John C. Box)
- Coinage, Weights and Measures (Chairman: Randolph Perkins; Ranking Member: Bill G. Lowrey)
- Disposition of Executive Papers (Chairman: Edward H. Wason; Ranking Member: Arthur B. Rouse)
- District of Columbia (Chairman: Frederick N. Zihlman; Ranking Member: Christopher D. Sullivan)
- Education (Chairman: Daniel A. Reed; Ranking Member: Bill G. Lowrey)
- Election of the President, Vice President and Representatives in Congress (Chairman: Hays B. White; Ranking Member: Lamar Jeffers)
- Elections No.#1 (Chairman: Don B. Colton; Ranking Member: C.B. Hudspeth)
- Elections No.#2 (Chairman: Bird J. Vincent; Ranking Member: Gordon Browning)
- Elections No.#3 (Chairman: Charles L. Gifford; Ranking Member: Guinn Williams)
- Enrolled Bills (Chairman: Guy E. Campbell; Ranking Member: Thomas L. Blanton)
- Expenditures in the Agriculture Department (Chairman: Edward J. King; Ranking Member: Frank Gardner)
- Expenditures in the Commerce Department (Chairman: Henry R. Rathbone; Ranking Member: Miles C. Allgood)
- Expenditures in the Interior Department (Chairman: William Williamson; Ranking Member: Sol Bloom)
- Expenditures in the Justice Department (Chairman: Willis G. Sears; Ranking Member: Frank Oliver)
- Expenditures in the Labor Department (Chairman: Carroll L. Beedy; Ranking Member: Thomas L. Blanton)
- Expenditures in the Navy Department (Chairman: George F. Brumm; Ranking Member: Charles L. Abernethy)
- Expenditures in the Post Office Department (Chairman: Philip D. Swing; Ranking Member: Guinn Williams)
- Expenditures in the State Department (Chairman: J. Will Taylor; Ranking Member: George C. Peery)
- Expenditures in the Treasury Department (Chairman: Ernest W. Gibson; Ranking Member: Heartsill Ragon)
- Expenditures in the War Department (Chairman: Thaddeus C. Sweet; Ranking Member: Arthur H. Greenwood)
- Expenditures on Public Buildings (Chairman: Elmer O. Leatherwood; Ranking Member: Samuel Dickstein)
- Flood Control (Chairman: Frank R. Reid; Ranking Member: Riley J. Wilson)
- Foreign Affairs (Chairman: Stephen G. Porter; Ranking Member: J. Charles Linthicum)
- Immigration and Naturalization (Chairman: Albert Johnson; Ranking Member: Adolph J. Sabath)
- Indian Affairs (Chairman: John W. Harreld; Ranking Member: Carl Hayden)
- Industrial Arts and Expositions (Chairman: George A. Welsh; Ranking Member: Fritz G. Lanham)
- Inquiry into Operation of the United States Air Services (Select) (Chairman: N/A)
- Insular Affairs (Chairman: Scott Leavitt; Ranking Member: Mell G. Underwood)
- Interstate and Foreign Commerce (Chairman: James S. Parker; Ranking Member: Alben W. Barkley)
- Invalid Pensions (Chairman: Charles E. Fuller; Ranking Member: Mell G. Underwood)
- Irrigation and Reclamation (Chairman: Addison T. Smith; Ranking Member: Carl Hayden)
- Judiciary (Chairman: George S. Graham; Ranking Member: Hatton W. Sumners)
- Labor (Chairman: William F. Kopp; Ranking Member: William D. Upshaw)
- Library (Chairman: Robert Luce; Ranking Member: Ralph Waldo Emerson Gilbert)
- Merchant Marine and Fisheries (Chairman: Frank D. Scott; Ranking Member: Ladislas Lazaro)
- Mileage (Chairman: Carroll L. Beedy; Ranking Member: John W. Moore)
- Military Affairs (Chairman: John M. Morin; Ranking Member: Percy E. Quin)
- Mines and Mining (Chairman: John M. Robsion; Ranking Member: Daniel Sutherland)
- Naval Affairs (Chairman: Thomas S. Butler; Ranking Member: Carl Vinson)
- Patents (Chairman: Albert H. Vestal; Ranking Member: Fritz G. Lanham)
- Pensions (Chairman: Harold Knutson; Ranking Member: William D. Upshaw)
- Post Office and Post Roads (Chairman: William W. Griest; Ranking Member: Thomas M. Bell)
- Printing (Chairman: Edward M. Beers; Ranking Member: William F. Stevenson)
- Public Buildings and Grounds (Chairman: Richard N. Elliott; Ranking Member: Fritz G. Lanham)
- Public Lands (Chairman: Nicholas J. Sinnott; Ranking Member: John E. Raker then John M. Evans)
- Railways and Canals (Chairman: Oscar E. Keller; Ranking Member: William C. Lankford)
- Revision of Laws (Chairman: Roy G. Fitzgerald; Ranking Member: Alfred L. Bulwinkle)
- Rivers and Harbors (Chairman: S. Wallace Dempsey; Ranking Member: Joseph J. Mansfield)
- Roads (Chairman: Cassius C. Dowell; Ranking Member: Edward B. Almon)
- Rules (Chairman: Bertrand H. Snell; Ranking Member: Edward W. Pou)
- Standards of Official Conduct
- Territories (Chairman: Charles F. Curry; Ranking Member: William C. Lankford)
- War Claims (Chairman: James G. Strong; Ranking Member: Bill G. Lowrey)
- Ways and Means (Chairman: William R. Green; Ranking Member: John N. Garner)
- Woman Suffrage (Chairman: Wallace H. White Jr.; Ranking Member: John E. Raker then Christopher D. Sullivan)
- World War Veterans' Legislation (Chairman: Royal C. Johnson; Ranking Member: Carl Hayden)
- Whole

=== Joint committees ===
- Civil Service Retirement Act
- Conditions of Indian Tribes (Special)
- Disposition of (Useless) Executive Papers
- Determine what Employment may be Furnished Federal Prisoners (Chairman: Rep. George S. Graham)
- Investigation of Northern Pacific Railroad Land Grants (Chairman: Rep. Nicholas J. Sinnott)
- Muscle Shoals
- The Library (Chairman: Sen. Simeon D. Fess)
- Printing (Chairman: Sen. George H. Moses; Vice Chairman: Rep. Edgar R. Kiess)
- Taxation (Chairman: Rep. William R. Green)

== Caucuses ==
- Democratic (House)
- Democratic (Senate)

== Employees ==
=== Legislative branch agency directors ===
- Architect of the Capitol: David Lynn
- Comptroller General of the United States: John R. McCarl
- Librarian of Congress: Herbert Putnam
- Public Printer of the United States: George H. Carter

=== Senate ===
- Chaplain: John J. Muir (Baptist)
- Secretary: George A. Sanderson, until December 7, 1925
  - Edwin P. Thayer, from December 7, 1925
- Librarian: Edward C. Goodwin
- Sergeant at Arms: David S. Barry

=== House of Representatives ===
- Chaplain: James S. Montgomery (Methodist)
- Clerk: William T. Page
- Clerk at the Speaker's Table: Lehr Fess, resigned February 1, 1927
  - Lewis Deschler, appointed February 1, 1927
- Doorkeeper: Bert W. Kennedy
- Reading Clerks: Patrick Joseph Haltigan (D) and Alney E. Chaffee (R)
- Postmaster: Frank W. Collier
- Sergeant at Arms: Joseph G. Rodgers

== See also ==
- 1924 United States elections (elections leading to this Congress)
  - 1924 United States presidential election
  - 1924 United States Senate elections
  - 1924 United States House of Representatives elections
- 1926 United States elections (elections during this Congress, leading to the next Congress)
  - 1926 United States Senate elections
  - 1926 United States House of Representatives elections
