= 63rd United States Congress =

1913-1915 U.S. Congress

←	62nd	64th	→
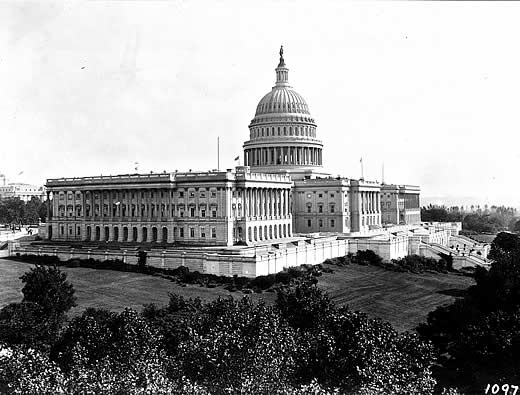
- United States Capitol (1906)

Overview
- Legislative body: United States Congress
- Jurisdiction: United States
- Term: March 4, 1913 – March 4, 1915

Senate
- Members: 96
- President: Thomas R. Marshall (D)
- President pro tempore: James P. Clarke (D)
- Party control: Democratic

House of Representatives
- Members: 435 representatives 5 non-voting delegates
- Speaker: Champ Clark (D)
- Party control: Democratic

Sessions
- Special (Note: Special session of the Senate.): March 4, 1913 – March 17, 1913
- 1st: April 7, 1913 – December 1, 1913
- 2nd: December 1, 1913 – October 24, 1914
- 3rd: December 7, 1914 – March 3, 1915

The 63rd United States Congress was a meeting of the legislative branch of the United States federal government, composed of the United States Senate and the United States House of Representatives. It met in Washington, D.C. from March 4, 1913, to March 4, 1915, during the first two years of Woodrow Wilson's presidency. The apportionment of seats in the House of Representatives was based on the 1910 United States census.

The Democrats had greatly increased their majority in the House, and won control of the Senate, giving them full control of Congress for the first time since the 53rd Congress in 1893. With Woodrow Wilson being sworn in as president on March 4, 1913, this gave the Democrats an overall federal government trifecta - also for the first time since the 53rd Congress.

== Major events ==
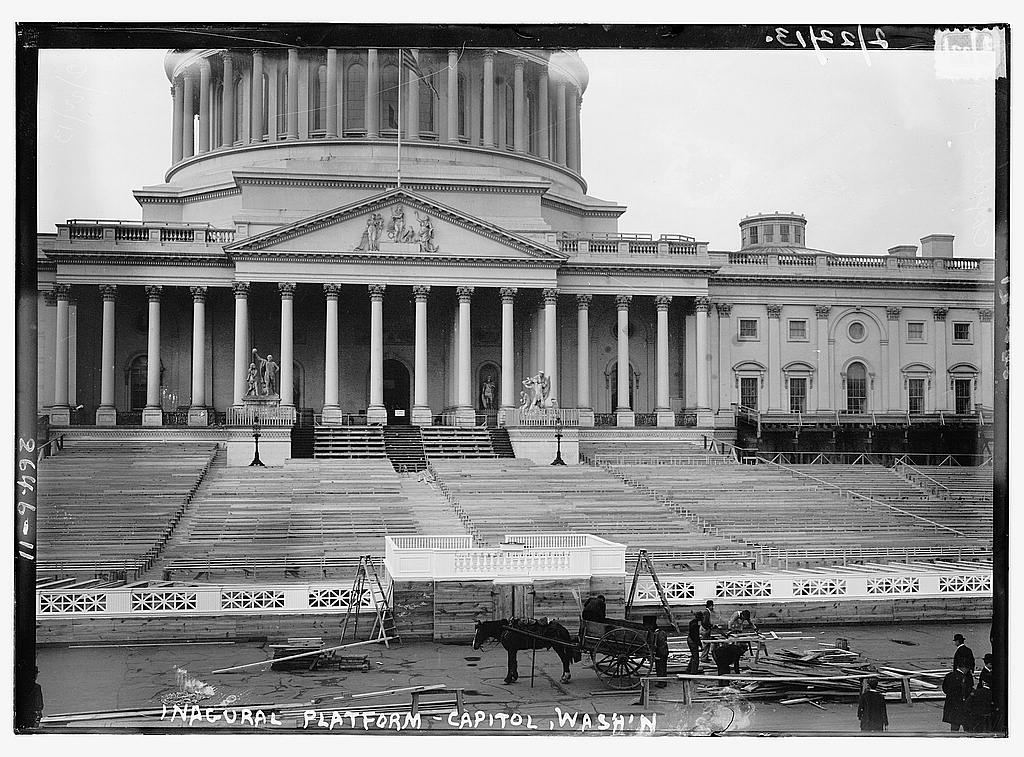
Inauguration platform being constructed on the east steps of the U.S. Capitol, ten days before Woodrow Wilson's March 4, 1913, presidential inauguration.

- March 4, 1913: Woodrow Wilson became President of the United States.
- March 9, 1914: The Senate adopted a rule forbidding smoking on the floor of the Senate because Senator Ben Tillman, recovering from a stroke, found the smoke irritating.
- July 28, 1914: World War I began in Europe
- August 15, 1914: The Panama Canal was inaugurated
- August 19, 1914: President Woodrow Wilson declared strict U.S. neutrality
- November 1914: United States House of Representatives elections, 1914 and United States Senate elections, 1914
- November 16, 1914: Federal Reserve Bank opened

== Major legislation ==
- May 27, 1913: Kern Resolution
- July 9, 1913: Saboth Act
- July 15, 1913: Newlands Labor Act
- October 3, 1913: Revenue Act of 1913 (Federal Income Tax), including Underwood Tariff
- October 22, 1913: Urgent Deficiencies Act
- December 19, 1913: Raker Act
- December 23, 1913: Federal Reserve Act, ch. 6, 38 Stat. 251, 12 U.S.C. § 221, et seq.
- May 8, 1914: Smith–Lever Act, ch. 79, 38 Stat. 372, 7 U.S.C. § 341
- June 24, 1914: Cutter Service Act
- June 30, 1914: Cooperative Funds Act
- July 17, 1914: Agricultural Entry Act
- July 18, 1914: Aviation Service Act
- July 21, 1914: Borland Amendment
- August 13, 1914: Smith–Hayden Act
- August 15, 1914: Sponge Act
- August 18, 1914: Cotton Futures Act of 1914
- August 18, 1914: Foreign Ship Registry Act
- August 22, 1914: Glacier National Park Act of 1914
- September 2, 1914: War Risk Insurance Act (Rayburn Act)
- September 26, 1914: Federal Trade Commission Act, ch. 311, 38 Stat. 717, 15 U.S.C. § 41
- October 2, 1914: River and Harbors Act of 1914
- October 15, 1914: Clayton Antitrust Act, ch. 323, 38 Stat. 730, 15 U.S.C. § 12, et seq.
- October 22, 1914: Emergency Internal Revenue Tax Act
- December 17, 1914: Harrison Narcotics Tax Act
- January 28, 1915: Coast Guard Act
- March 4, 1915: Merchant Marine Act of 1915
- March 4, 1915: River and Harbors Act of 1915
- March 4, 1915: Standard Barrel Act For Fruits, Vegetables, and Dry Commodities
- March 4, 1915: Federal Boiler Inspection Act
- March 4, 1915: Uniform Bill of Lading Act
- March 4, 1915: Occupancy Permits Act

== Constitutional amendments ==
- April 8, 1913: Seventeenth Amendment to the United States Constitution, establishing the popular election of United States senators by the people of the states, was ratified by the requisite number of states (then 36) to become part of the Constitution

== Party summary ==
=== Senate ===
	Party (shading shows control)			Total	Vacant
	Democratic (D)	Bull Moose (Prog.)	Republican (R)	Total	Vacant
End of previous congress	45	0	50	95	1
Begin	49	1	42	92	4
End	53	1	42	96	0
Final voting share	55.2%	1.0%	43.8%		
Beginning of next congress	56	0	40	96	0

=== House of Representatives ===
	Party (shading shows control)					Total	Vacant
	Democratic (D)	Bull Moose (Prog.)	Independent (I)	Republican (R)	Other	Total	Vacant
End of previous congress	225	0	0	156	1 (Note: Socialist)	382	12
Begin	289	10	1	134	0	434	1
End	282	11	1	130	0	424	11
Final voting share	66.5%	2.6%	0.2%	30.7%	0.0%		
Beginning of next congress	230	5	1	194	2 (Note: Socialist & Prohibition)	432	3

== Leadership ==
=== Senate leadership ===
Senate president

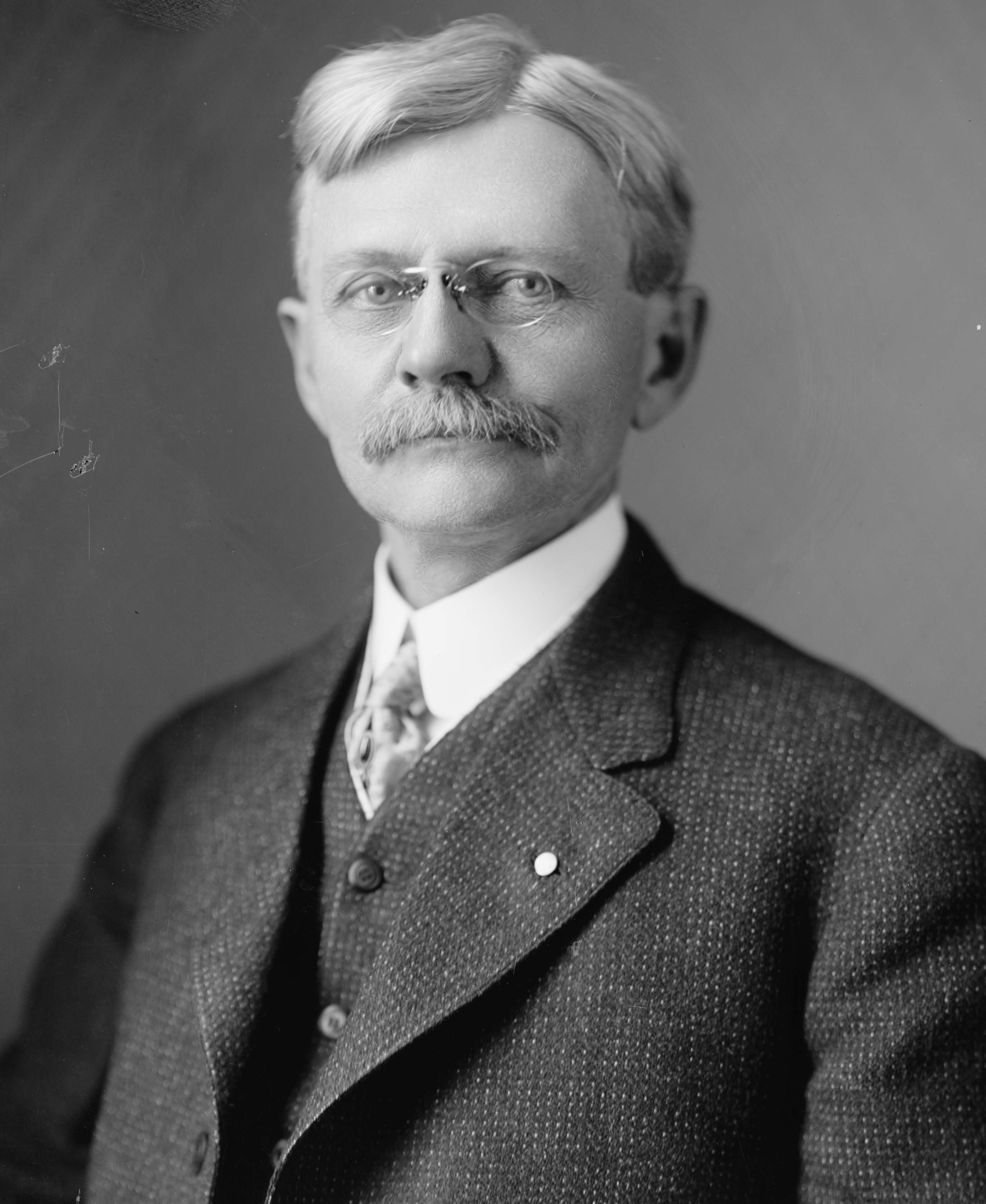
Thomas R. Marshall (D)

Senate president pro tempore

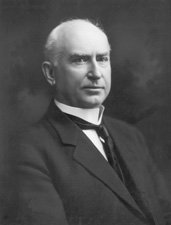
James Paul Clarke (D)

==== Presiding ====
- President: Thomas R. Marshall (D)
- President pro tempore: James P. Clarke (D)
- Majority Whip: J. Hamilton Lewis (D)
- Minority Whip: James W. Wadsworth Jr. (R) until March 4; Charles Curtis (R) starting March 4
- Democratic Caucus Chairman: John W. Kern
- Republican Conference Chairman: Jacob Harold Gallinger
- Democratic Caucus Secretary: Willard Saulsbury Jr.
- Republican Conference Secretary: William Squire Kenyon

=== House leadership ===
House Speaker

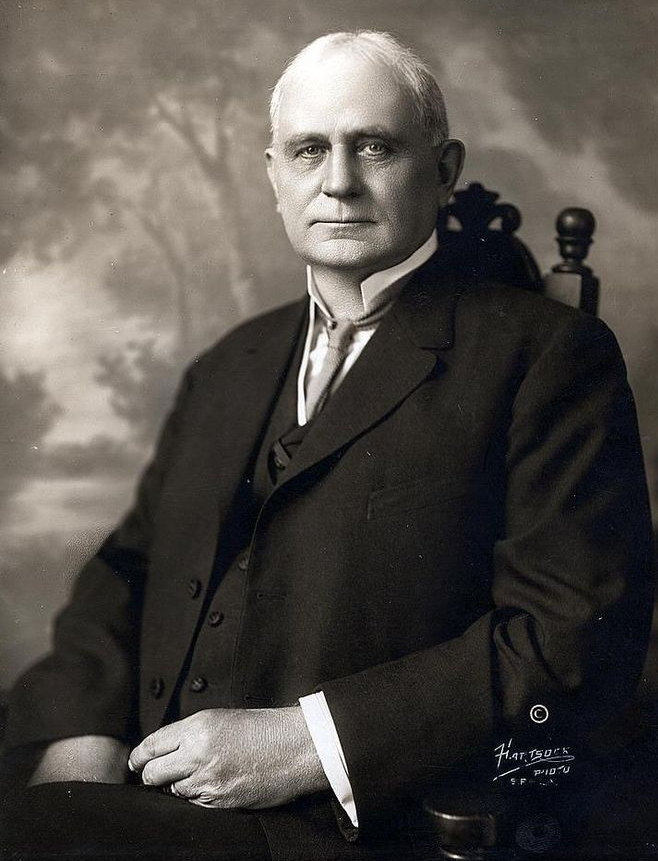
Champ Clark (D)

==== Presiding ====
- Speaker: Champ Clark (D)

==== Majority (Democratic) leadership ====
- Majority Leader: Oscar Underwood
- Majority Whip: Thomas M. Bell
- Democratic Caucus Chairman: A. Mitchell Palmer
- Democratic Campaign Committee Chairman: Frank Ellsworth Doremus

==== Minority (Republican) leadership ====
- Minority Leader: James R. Mann
- Minority Whip: Charles H. Burke
- Republican Conference Chairman: William S. Greene
- Republican Campaign Committee Chairman: Frank P. Woods

== Members ==
Skip to House of Representatives, below

=== Senate ===
Most senators were elected by the state legislatures every two years, with one-third beginning new six-year terms with each Congress. A few senators were elected directly by the residents of the state. Preceding the names in the list below are Senate class numbers, which indicate the cycle of their election, In this Congress, Class 3 meant their term ended with this Congress, requiring reelection in 1914; Class 1 meant their term began in the last Congress, requiring reelection in 1916; and Class 2 meant their term began in this Congress, requiring reelection in 1918.

==== Alabama ====
▌2. John H. Bankhead (D)
▌3. Joseph F. Johnston (D), until August 8, 1913

▌Frank White (D), from May 11, 1914

==== Arizona ====
▌1. Henry F. Ashurst (D)
▌3. Marcus A. Smith (D)

==== Arkansas ====
▌2. Joseph Taylor Robinson (D)
▌3. James P. Clarke (D)

==== California ====
▌1. John D. Works (R)
▌3. George C. Perkins (R)

==== Colorado ====
▌2. John F. Shafroth (D)
▌3. Charles S. Thomas (D)

==== Connecticut ====
▌1. George P. McLean (R)
▌3. Frank B. Brandegee (R)

==== Delaware ====
▌1. Henry A. du Pont (R)
▌2. Willard Saulsbury Jr. (D)

==== Florida ====
▌1. Nathan P. Bryan (D)
▌3. Duncan U. Fletcher (D)

==== Georgia ====
▌2. Augustus O. Bacon (D), until February 14, 1914

▌William S. West (D), March 2, 1914 – November 3, 1914
▌Thomas W. Hardwick (D), from November 4, 1914

▌3. Hoke Smith (D)

==== Idaho ====
▌2. William E. Borah (R)
▌3. James H. Brady (R)

==== Illinois ====
▌2. James Hamilton Lewis (D), from March 26, 1913
▌3. Lawrence Y. Sherman (R), from March 26, 1913

==== Indiana ====
▌1. John W. Kern (D)
▌3. Benjamin F. Shively (D)

==== Iowa ====
▌2. William S. Kenyon (R)
▌3. Albert B. Cummins (R)

==== Kansas ====
▌2. William H. Thompson (D)
▌3. Joseph L. Bristow (R)

==== Kentucky ====
▌2. Ollie M. James (D)
▌3. William O. Bradley (R), until May 23, 1914

▌Johnson N. Camden Jr. (D), from June 16, 1914

==== Louisiana ====
▌2. Joseph E. Ransdell (D)
▌3. John Thornton (D)

==== Maine ====
▌1. Charles Fletcher Johnson (D)
▌2. Edwin C. Burleigh (R)

==== Maryland ====
▌1. William P. Jackson (R), until January 28, 1914

▌Blair Lee (D), from January 28, 1914

▌3. John W. Smith (D)

==== Massachusetts ====
▌1. Henry Cabot Lodge (R)
▌2. John W. Weeks (R)

==== Michigan ====
▌1. Charles E. Townsend (R)
▌2. William Alden Smith (R)

==== Minnesota ====
▌1. Moses E. Clapp (R)
▌2. Knute Nelson (R)

==== Mississippi ====
▌1. John Sharp Williams (D)
▌2. James K. Vardaman (D)

==== Missouri ====
▌1. James A. Reed (D)
▌3. William J. Stone (D)

==== Montana ====
▌1. Henry L. Myers (D)
▌2. Thomas J. Walsh (D)

==== Nebraska ====
▌1. Gilbert M. Hitchcock (D)
▌2. George W. Norris (R)

==== Nevada ====
▌1. Key Pittman (D)
▌3. Francis G. Newlands (D)

==== New Hampshire ====
▌2. Henry F. Hollis (D), from March 13, 1913
▌3. Jacob H. Gallinger (R)

==== New Jersey ====
▌1. James E. Martine (D)
▌2. William Hughes (D)

==== New Mexico ====
▌1. Thomas B. Catron (R)
▌2. Albert B. Fall (R)

==== New York ====
▌1. James A. O'Gorman (D)
▌3. Elihu A. Root (R)

==== North Carolina ====
▌2. Furnifold M. Simmons (D)
▌3. Lee S. Overman (D)

==== North Dakota ====
▌1. Porter J. McCumber (R)
▌3. Asle Gronna (R)

==== Ohio ====
▌1. Atlee Pomerene (D)
▌3. Theodore E. Burton (R)

==== Oklahoma ====
▌2. Robert L. Owen (D)
▌3. Thomas P. Gore (D)

==== Oregon ====
▌2. Harry Lane (D)
▌3. George E. Chamberlain (D)

==== Pennsylvania ====
▌1. George T. Oliver (R)
▌3. Boies Penrose (R)

==== Rhode Island ====
▌1. Henry F. Lippitt (R)
▌2. LeBaron B. Colt (R)

==== South Carolina ====
▌2. Benjamin R. Tillman (D)
▌3. Ellison D. Smith (D)

==== South Dakota ====
▌2. Thomas Sterling (R)
▌3. Coe I. Crawford (R)

==== Tennessee ====
▌1. Luke Lea (D)
▌2. John K. Shields (D)

==== Texas ====
▌1. Charles A. Culberson (D)
▌2. Morris Sheppard (D)

==== Utah ====
▌1. George Sutherland (R)
▌3. Reed Smoot (R)

==== Vermont ====
▌1. Carroll S. Page (R)
▌3. William P. Dillingham (R)

==== Virginia ====
▌1. Claude A. Swanson (D)
▌2. Thomas S. Martin (D)

==== Washington ====
▌1. Miles Poindexter (Prog.)
▌3. Wesley L. Jones (R)

==== West Virginia ====
▌1. William E. Chilton (D)
▌2. Nathan Goff (R), from April 1, 1913

==== Wisconsin ====
▌1. Robert M. La Follette Sr. (R)
▌3. Isaac Stephenson (R)

==== Wyoming ====
▌1. Clarence D. Clark (R)
▌2. Francis E. Warren (R)

Senators' party membership by state at the opening of the 63rd Congress in March 1913. The green stripes represent Progressive Miles Poindexter. 2 Democrats 1 Democrat and 1 Republican 2 Republicans

=== House of Representatives ===
==== Alabama ====
▌1. George W. Taylor (D)
▌2. S. Hubert Dent Jr. (D)
▌3. Henry D. Clayton (D), until May 25, 1914

▌William Oscar Mulkey (D), from June 29, 1914

▌4. Fred L. Blackmon (D)
▌5. J. Thomas Heflin (D)
▌6. Richmond P. Hobson (D)
▌7. John L. Burnett (D)
▌8. William N. Richardson (D), until March 31, 1914

▌Christopher Columbus Harris (D), from May 11, 1914

▌9. Oscar Underwood (D)
▌At-large: John Abercrombie (D)

==== Arizona ====
▌At-large: Carl Hayden (D)

==== Arkansas ====
▌1. Thaddeus H. Caraway (D)
▌2. William A. Oldfield (D)
▌3. John C. Floyd (D)
▌4. Otis Wingo (D)
▌5. Henderson M. Jacoway (D)
▌6. Samuel M. Taylor (D)
▌7. William S. Goodwin (D)

==== California ====
▌1. William Kent (I)
▌2. John E. Raker (D)
▌3. Charles F. Curry (R)
▌4. Julius Kahn (R)
▌5. John I. Nolan (R)
▌6. Joseph R. Knowland (R)
▌7. Denver S. Church (D)
▌8. Everis A. Hayes (R)
▌9. Charles W. Bell (Prog.)
▌10. William Stephens (Prog.)
▌11. William Kettner (D)

==== Colorado ====
▌1. George John Kindel (D)
▌2. Harry Hunter Seldomridge (D)
▌At-large: Edward T. Taylor (D)
▌At-large: Edward Keating (D)

==== Connecticut ====
▌1. Augustine Lonergan (D)
▌2. Bryan F. Mahan (D)
▌3. Thomas L. Reilly (D)
▌4. Jeremiah Donovan (D)
▌5. William Kennedy (D)

==== Delaware ====
▌At-large: Franklin Brockson (D)

==== Florida ====
▌1. Stephen M. Sparkman (D)
▌2. Frank Clark (D)
▌3. Emmett Wilson (D)
▌At-large: Claude L'Engle (D)

==== Georgia ====
▌1. Charles G. Edwards (D)
▌2. Seaborn Roddenbery (D), until September 25, 1913

▌Frank Park (D), from November 4, 1913

▌3. Charles R. Crisp (D)
▌4. William C. Adamson (D)
▌5. William S. Howard (D)
▌6. Charles L. Bartlett (D)
▌7. Gordon Lee (D)
▌8. Samuel J. Tribble (D)
▌9. Thomas Montgomery Bell (D)
▌10. Thomas W. Hardwick (D), until November 2, 1914

▌Carl Vinson (D), from November 3, 1914

▌11. John R. Walker (D)
▌12. Dudley M. Hughes (D)

==== Idaho ====
▌At-large: Addison T. Smith (R)
▌At-large: Burton L. French (R)

==== Illinois ====
▌1. Martin B. Madden (R)
▌2. James R. Mann (R)
▌3. George E. Gorman (D)
▌4. James T. McDermott (D), until July 21, 1914
▌5. Adolph J. Sabath (D)
▌6. James McAndrews (D)
▌7. Frank Buchanan (D)
▌8. Thomas Gallagher (D)
▌9. Frederick A. Britten (R)
▌10. Charles M. Thomson (Prog.)
▌11. Ira C. Copley (R)
▌12. William H. Hinebaugh (Prog.)
▌13. John C. McKenzie (R)
▌14. Clyde H. Tavenner (D)
▌15. Stephen A. Hoxworth (D)
▌16. Claude U. Stone (D)
▌17. Louis Fitzhenry (D)
▌18. Frank T. O'Hair (D)
▌19. Charles M. Borchers (D)
▌20. Henry T. Rainey (D)
▌21. James M. Graham (D)
▌22. William N. Baltz (D)
▌23. Martin D. Foster (D)
▌24. H. Robert Fowler (D)
▌25. Robert P. Hill (D)
▌At-large: Lawrence B. Stringer (D)
▌At-large: William E. Williams (D)

==== Indiana ====
▌1. Charles Lieb (D)
▌2. William A. Cullop (D)
▌3. William E. Cox (D)
▌4. Lincoln Dixon (D)
▌5. Ralph Wilbur Moss (D)
▌6. Finly H. Gray (D)
▌7. Charles A. Korbly (D)
▌8. John A. M. Adair (D)
▌9. Martin A. Morrison (D)
▌10. John B. Peterson (D)
▌11. George W. Rauch (D)
▌12. Cyrus Cline (D)
▌13. Henry A. Barnhart (D)

==== Iowa ====
▌1. Charles A. Kennedy (R)
▌2. Irvin S. Pepper (D), until December 22, 1913

▌Henry Vollmer (D), from February 10, 1914

▌3. Maurice Connolly (D)
▌4. Gilbert N. Haugen (R)
▌5. James W. Good (R)
▌6. Sanford Kirkpatrick (D)
▌7. Solomon F. Prouty (R)
▌8. Horace M. Towner (R)
▌9. William R. Green (R)
▌10. Frank P. Woods (R)
▌11. George Cromwell Scott (R)

==== Kansas ====
▌1. Daniel Read Anthony Jr. (R)
▌2. Joseph Taggart (D)
▌3. Philip P. Campbell (R)
▌4. Dudley Doolittle (D)
▌5. Guy T. Helvering (D)
▌6. John R. Connelly (D)
▌7. George A. Neeley (D)
▌8. Victor Murdock (R)

==== Kentucky ====
▌1. Alben Barkley (D)
▌2. Augustus Stanley (D)
▌3. Robert Y. Thomas Jr. (D)
▌4. Ben Johnson (D)
▌5. J. Swagar Sherley (D)
▌6. Arthur B. Rouse (D)
▌7. J. Campbell Cantrill (D)
▌8. Harvey Helm (D)
▌9. William Jason Fields (D)
▌10. John W. Langley (R)
▌11. Caleb Powers (R)

==== Louisiana ====
▌1. Albert Estopinal (D)
▌2. Henry Garland Dupré (D)
▌3. Robert F. Broussard (D)
▌4. John Thomas Watkins (D)
▌5. James Walter Elder (D)
▌6. Lewis Lovering Morgan (D)
▌7. Ladislas Lazaro (D)
▌8. James Benjamin Aswell (D)

==== Maine ====
▌1. Asher C. Hinds (R)
▌2. Daniel J. McGillicuddy (D)
▌3. Forrest Goodwin (R), until May 28, 1913

▌John A. Peters (R), from September 9, 1913

▌4. Frank E. Guernsey (R)

==== Maryland ====
▌1. J. Harry Covington (D), until September 30, 1914

▌Jesse D. Price (D), from November 3, 1914

▌2. J. Frederick C. Talbott (D)
▌3. George Konig (D), until May 31, 1913

▌Charles P. Coady (D), from November 4, 1913

▌4. J. Charles Linthicum (D)
▌5. Frank Owens Smith (D)
▌6. David J. Lewis (D)

==== Massachusetts ====
▌1. Allen T. Treadway (R)
▌2. Frederick H. Gillett (R)
▌3. William H. Wilder (R), until September 11, 1913

▌Calvin D. Paige (R), from November 4, 1913

▌4. Samuel E. Winslow (R)
▌5. John J. Rogers (R)
▌6. Augustus P. Gardner (R)
▌7. Michael F. Phelan (D)
▌8. Frederick S. Deitrick (D)
▌9. Ernest W. Roberts (R)
▌10. William F. Murray (D), until September 28, 1914
▌11. Andrew J. Peters (D), until August 15, 1914
▌12. James Michael Curley (D), until February 4, 1914

▌James A. Gallivan (D), from April 7, 1914

▌13. John W. Weeks (R), until March 4, 1913

▌John J. Mitchell (D), from April 15, 1913

▌14. Edward Gilmore (D)
▌15. William S. Greene (R)
▌16. Thomas Chandler Thacher (D)

==== Michigan ====
▌1. Frank E. Doremus (D)
▌2. Samuel Beakes (D)
▌3. John M. C. Smith (R)
▌4. Edward L. Hamilton (R)
▌5. Carl Mapes (R)
▌6. Samuel W. Smith (R)
▌7. Louis C. Cramton (R)
▌8. Joseph W. Fordney (R)
▌9. James C. McLaughlin (R)
▌10. Roy O. Woodruff (Prog.)
▌11. Francis O. Lindquist (R)
▌12. H. Olin Young (R), until May 16, 1913

▌William Josiah MacDonald (Prog.), from August 26, 1913

▌At-large: Patrick H. Kelley (R)

==== Minnesota ====
▌1. Sydney Anderson (R)
▌2. Winfield Scott Hammond (D), until January 6, 1915
▌3. Charles Russell Davis (R)
▌4. Frederick C. Stevens (R)
▌5. George Ross Smith (R)
▌6. Charles August Lindbergh (R)
▌7. Andrew Volstead (R)
▌8. Clarence B. Miller (R)
▌9. Halvor Steenerson (R)
▌At-large. James Manahan (R)

==== Mississippi ====
▌1. Ezekiel S. Candler Jr. (D)
▌2. Hubert D. Stephens (D)
▌3. Benjamin G. Humphreys II (D)
▌4. Thomas U. Sisson (D)
▌5. Samuel Andrew Witherspoon (D)
▌6. Pat Harrison (D)
▌7. Percy E. Quin (D)
▌8. James W. Collier (D)

==== Missouri ====
▌1. James T. Lloyd (D)
▌2. William W. Rucker (D)
▌3. Joshua Willis Alexander (D)
▌4. Charles F. Booher (D)
▌5. William Patterson Borland (D)
▌6. Clement C. Dickinson (D)
▌7. Courtney W. Hamlin (D)
▌8. Dorsey W. Shackleford (D)
▌9. James Beauchamp Clark (D)
▌10. Richard Bartholdt (R)
▌11. William Leo Igoe (D)
▌12. Leonidas C. Dyer (R), until June 19, 1914

▌Michael Joseph Gill (D), from June 19, 1914

▌13. Walter Lewis Hensley (D)
▌14. Joseph J. Russell (D)
▌15. Perl D. Decker (D)
▌16. Thomas L. Rubey (D)

==== Montana ====
▌At-large: John M. Evans (D)
▌At-large: Tom Stout (D)

==== Nebraska ====
▌1. John A. Maguire (D)
▌2. Charles O. Lobeck (D)
▌3. Dan V. Stephens (D)
▌4. Charles Henry Sloan (R)
▌5. Silas Reynolds Barton (R)
▌6. Moses P. Kinkaid (R)

==== Nevada ====
▌At-large: Edwin E. Roberts (R)

==== New Hampshire ====
▌1. Eugene Elliott Reed (D)
▌2. Raymond Bartlett Stevens (D)

==== New Jersey ====
▌1. William J. Browning (R)
▌2. J. Thompson Baker (D)
▌3. Thomas J. Scully (D)
▌4. Allan B. Walsh (D)
▌5. William E. Tuttle Jr. (D)
▌6. Lewis J. Martin (D), until May 5, 1913

▌Archibald C. Hart (D), from July 22, 1913

▌7. Robert G. Bremner (D), until February 5, 1914

▌Dow H. Drukker (R), from April 7, 1914

▌8. Eugene F. Kinkead (D), until February 4, 1915
▌9. Walter I. McCoy (D), until October 3, 1914

▌Richard Wayne Parker (R), from December 1, 1914

▌10. Edward W. Townsend (D)
▌11. John J. Eagan (D)
▌12. James A. Hamill (D)

==== New Mexico ====
▌At-large: Harvey B. Fergusson (D)

==== New York ====
▌1. Lathrop Brown (D)
▌2. Denis O'Leary (D), until December 31, 1914
▌3. Frank E. Wilson (D)
▌4. Harry H. Dale (D)
▌5. James P. Maher (D)
▌6. William M. Calder (R)
▌7. John J. Fitzgerald (D)
▌8. Daniel J. Griffin (D)
▌9. James H. O'Brien (D)
▌10. Herman A. Metz (D)
▌11. Daniel J. Riordan (D)
▌12. Henry M. Goldfogle (D)
▌13. Timothy D. Sullivan (D), until August 31, 1913

▌George W. Loft (D), from November 4, 1913

▌14. Jefferson M. Levy (D)
▌15. Michael F. Conry (D)
▌16. Peter J. Dooling (D)
▌17. John F. Carew (D)
▌18. Thomas G. Patten (D)
▌19. Walter M. Chandler (Prog.)
▌20. Francis B. Harrison (D), until September 1, 1913

▌Jacob A. Cantor (D), from November 4, 1913

▌21. Henry George Jr. (D)
▌22. Henry Bruckner (D)
▌23. Joseph A. Goulden (D)
▌24. Woodson R. Oglesby (D)
▌25. Benjamin I. Taylor (D)
▌26. Edmund Platt (R)
▌27. George McClellan (D)
▌28. Peter G. Ten Eyck (D)
▌29. James S. Parker (R)
▌30. Samuel Wallin (R)
▌31. Edwin A. Merritt (R), until December 4, 1914
▌32. Luther W. Mott (R)
▌33. Charles A. Talcott (D)
▌34. George W. Fairchild (R)
▌35. John R. Clancy (D)
▌36. Sereno E. Payne (R), until December 10, 1914
▌37. Edwin S. Underhill (D)
▌38. Thomas B. Dunn (R)
▌39. Henry G. Danforth (R)
▌40. Robert H. Gittins (D)
▌41. Charles B. Smith (D)
▌42. Daniel A. Driscoll (D)
▌43. Charles M. Hamilton (R)

==== North Carolina ====
▌1. John Humphrey Small (D)
▌2. Claude Kitchin (D)
▌3. John M. Faison (D)
▌4. Edward W. Pou (D)
▌5. Charles M. Stedman (D)
▌6. Hannibal L. Godwin (D)
▌7. Robert N. Page (D)
▌8. Robert L. Doughton (D)
▌9. Edwin Y. Webb (D)
▌10. James M. Gudger Jr. (D)

==== North Dakota ====
▌1. Henry Thomas Helgesen (R)
▌2. George M. Young (R)
▌3. Patrick Daniel Norton (R)

==== Ohio ====
▌1. Stanley E. Bowdle (D)
▌2. Alfred G. Allen (D)
▌3. Warren Gard (D)
▌4. J. Henry Goeke (D)
▌5. Timothy T. Ansberry (D), until January 9, 1915
▌6. Simeon D. Fess (R)
▌7. James D. Post (D)
▌8. Frank B. Willis (R), until January 9, 1915
▌9. Isaac R. Sherwood (D)
▌10. Robert M. Switzer (R)
▌11. Horatio C. Claypool (D)
▌12. Clement L. Brumbaugh (D)
▌13. John A. Key (D)
▌14. William G. Sharp (D), until July 23, 1914
▌15. George White (D)
▌16. William B. Francis (D)
▌17. William A. Ashbrook (D)
▌18. John J. Whitacre (D)
▌19. Elsworth R. Bathrick (D)
▌20. William Gordon (D)
▌21. Robert J. Bulkley (D)
▌At-large: Robert Crosser (D)

==== Oklahoma ====
▌1. Bird Segle McGuire (R)
▌2. Dick Thompson Morgan (R)
▌3. James S. Davenport (D)
▌4. Charles D. Carter (D)
▌5. Scott Ferris (D)
▌At-large: William H. Murray (D)
▌At-large: Joseph Bryan Thompson (D)
▌At-large: Claude Weaver (D)

==== Oregon ====
▌1. Willis C. Hawley (R)
▌2. Nicholas J. Sinnott (R)
▌3. Walter Lafferty (R)

==== Pennsylvania ====
▌1. William S. Vare (R)
▌2. George S. Graham (R)
▌3. J. Hampton Moore (R)
▌4. George W. Edmonds (R)
▌5. Michael Donohoe (D)
▌6. J. Washington Logue (D)
▌7. Thomas S. Butler (R)
▌8. Robert E. Difenderfer (D)
▌9. William W. Griest (R)
▌10. John R. Farr (R)
▌11. John J. Casey (D)
▌12. Robert Emmett Lee (D)
▌13. John H. Rothermel (D)
▌14. William D. B. Ainey (R)
▌15. Edgar R. Kiess (R)
▌16. John V. Lesher (D)
▌17. Franklin L. Dershem (D)
▌18. Aaron S. Kreider (R)
▌19. Warren W. Bailey (D)
▌20. Andrew R. Brodbeck (D)
▌21. Charles E. Patton (R)
▌22. Abraham L. Keister (R)
▌23. Wooda N. Carr (D)
▌24. Henry W. Temple (Prog.)
▌25. Milton W. Shreve (R)
▌26. A. Mitchell Palmer (D)
▌27. J. N. Langham (R)
▌28. Willis J. Hulings (Prog.)
▌29. Stephen G. Porter (R)
▌30. M. Clyde Kelly (R)
▌31. James F. Burke (R)
▌32. Andrew J. Barchfeld (R)
▌At-large: Fred E. Lewis (R)
▌At-large: John M. Morin (R)
▌At-large: Anderson H. Walters (R)
▌At-large: Arthur R. Rupley (R)

==== Rhode Island ====
▌1. George Francis O'Shaunessy (D)
▌2. Peter G. Gerry (D)
▌3. Ambrose Kennedy (R)

==== South Carolina ====
▌1. Richard S. Whaley (D), from April 29, 1913
▌2. James F. Byrnes (D)
▌3. Wyatt Aiken (D)
▌4. Joseph T. Johnson (D)
▌5. David E. Finley (D)
▌6. J. Willard Ragsdale (D)
▌7. Asbury F. Lever (D)

==== South Dakota ====
▌1. Charles H. Dillon (R)
▌2. Charles H. Burke (R)
▌3. Eben W. Martin (R)

==== Tennessee ====
▌1. Sam R. Sells (R)
▌2. Richard W. Austin (R)
▌3. John A. Moon (D)
▌4. Cordell Hull (D)
▌5. William C. Houston (D)
▌6. Joseph W. Byrns (D)
▌7. Lemuel P. Padgett (D)
▌8. Thetus W. Sims (D)
▌9. Finis J. Garrett (D)
▌10. Kenneth McKellar (D)

==== Texas ====
▌1. Horace Worth Vaughan (D)
▌2. Martin Dies (D)
▌3. James Young (D)
▌4. Sam Rayburn (D)
▌5. James Andrew Beall (D)
▌6. Rufus Hardy (D)
▌7. Alexander W. Gregg (D)
▌8. Joe H. Eagle (D)
▌9. George Farmer Burgess (D)
▌10. Albert S. Burleson (D), until March 6, 1913

▌James P. Buchanan (D), from April 15, 1913

▌11. Robert L. Henry (D)
▌12. Oscar Callaway (D)
▌13. John H. Stephens (D)
▌14. James L. Slayden (D)
▌15. John Nance Garner (D)
▌16. William R. Smith (D)
▌At-large: Daniel E. Garrett (D)
▌At-large: Hatton W. Sumners (D)

==== Utah ====
▌At-large: Joseph Howell (R)
▌At-large: Jacob Johnson (R)

==== Vermont ====
▌1. Frank L. Greene (R)
▌2. Frank Plumley (R)

==== Virginia ====
▌1. William A. Jones (D)
▌2. Edward Everett Holland (D)
▌3. Andrew Jackson Montague (D)
▌4. Walter Allen Watson (D)
▌5. Edward W. Saunders (D)
▌6. Carter Glass (D)
▌7. James Hay (D)
▌8. Charles Creighton Carlin (D)
▌9. C. Bascom Slemp (R)
▌10. Henry D. Flood (D)

==== Washington ====
▌1. William E. Humphrey (R)
▌2. Albert Johnson (R)
▌3. William Leroy La Follette (R)
▌At-large: James W. Bryan (Prog.)
▌At-large: Jacob Falconer (Prog.)

==== West Virginia ====
▌1. John W. Davis (D), until August 29, 1913

▌Matthew M. Neely (D), from October 14, 1913

▌2. William Gay Brown Jr. (D)
▌3. Samuel B. Avis (R)
▌4. Hunter H. Moss Jr. (R)
▌5. James Anthony Hughes (R)
▌At-large: Howard Sutherland (R)

==== Wisconsin ====
▌1. Henry Allen Cooper (R)
▌2. Michael Edmund Burke (D)
▌3. John M. Nelson (R)
▌4. William J. Cary (R)
▌5. William H. Stafford (R)
▌6. Michael K. Reilly (D)
▌7. John J. Esch (R)
▌8. Edward E. Browne (R)
▌9. Thomas Frank Konop (D)
▌10. James A. Frear (R)
▌11. Irvine L. Lenroot (R)

==== Wyoming ====
▌At-large: Franklin Wheeler Mondell (R)

==== Non-voting members ====
▌Alaska Territory. James Wickersham (R)
▌Hawaii Territory. Jonah Kūhiō Kalanianaʻole (R)
▌Philippines. Manuel Earnshaw (Ind.)
▌Philippines. Manuel L. Quezon (Nac.)
▌Puerto Rico. Luis Muñoz Rivera (Unionist)

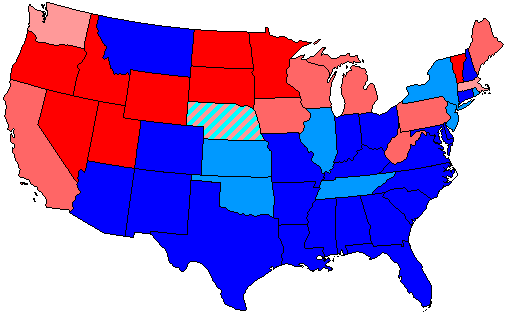
House seats by party holding plurality in state: 80+% to 100% Democratic / 80+% to 100% Republican; 60+% to 80% Democratic / 60+% to 80% Republican; Up to 60% Democratic / Up to 60% Republican

== Changes in membership ==
The count below reflects changes from the beginning of the first session of this Congress.

=== Senate ===
- Replacements: 3
  - Democratic: 2 seat net gain
  - Republican: 2 seat net loss
- Deaths: 3
- Resignations: 3
- Vacancies: 3
- Total seats with changes: 9

State	Senator	Reason for vacancy	Successor	Date of successor's installation
New Hampshire (2)	Vacant	Elected late.	Henry F. Hollis (D)	March 13, 1913
Illinois (2)	Vacant	Due to US Sen.Lorimer scandal, general assembly refused to seat elected Senator at beginning of term. Compromise was later reached with Governor of Illinois to seat senator to replace Lorimer after another election was called.	J. Hamilton Lewis (D)	March 26, 1913
Illinois (3)	Vacant	Due to US Sen.Lorimer scandal, general assembly refused to seat elected Senator at beginning of term. Compromise was later reached with Governor of Illinois to seat senator who supported Sen Lorimer.	Lawrence Y. Sherman (R)	March 26, 1913
West Virginia (2)	Vacant	Elected to seat at beginning of term but delayed installation to continue as judge of U.S. Court of Appeals for the Fourth Circuit	Nathan Goff Jr. (R)	April 1, 1913
Alabama (3)	Joseph F. Johnston (D)	Died August 8, 1913. Successor was appointed to finish term.	Francis S. White (D)	May 11, 1914
Maryland (1)	William P. Jackson (R)	Successor was elected.	Blair Lee (D)	January 28, 1914
Georgia (2)	Augustus O. Bacon (D)	Died February 14, 1914. Successor was appointed.	William S. West (D)	March 2, 1914
Kentucky (3)	William O. Bradley (R)	Died May 23, 1914. Successor was appointed and subsequently elected.	Johnson N. Camden Jr. (D)	June 16, 1914
Georgia (2)	William S. West (D)	Successor was elected.	Thomas W. Hardwick (D)	November 4, 1914

=== House of Representatives ===
- Replacements: 20
  - Democratic: 1 seat gain
  - Republican: 2 seat loss
  - Progressive: 1 seat gain
- Deaths: 11
- Resignations: 19
- Contested elections: 2
- Total seats with changes: 15

District	Vacated by	Reason for vacancy	Successor	Date of successor's installation
South Carolina 1st	Vacant	Rep. George S. Legaré died during previous congress	Richard S. Whaley (D)	April 29, 1913
Massachusetts 13th	John W. Weeks (R)	Resigned March 4, 1913, after being elected to the U.S. Senate	John J. Mitchell (D)	April 15, 1913
Texas 10th	Albert S. Burleson (D)	Resigned March 6, 1913, after being appointed United States Postmaster General	James P. Buchanan (D)	April 15, 1913
New Jersey 6th	Lewis J. Martin (D)	Died May 5, 1913	Archibald C. Hart (D)	July 22, 1913
Michigan 12th	H. Olin Young (R)	Resigned May 16, 1913, while election was being contested	William J. MacDonald (Prog.)	August 26, 1913
Maine 3rd	Forrest Goodwin (R)	Died May 28, 1913	John A. Peters (R)	September 9, 1913
Maryland 3rd	George Konig (D)	Died May 31, 1913	Charles P. Coady (D)	November 4, 1913
West Virginia 1st	John W. Davis (D)	Resigned August 29, 1913, after being appointed Solicitor General of the United States	Matthew M. Neely (D)	October 14, 1913
New York 13th	Timothy Sullivan (D)	Died August 31, 1913	George W. Loft (D)	November 4, 1913
New York 20th	Francis B. Harrison (D)	Resigned September 1, 1913, after being appointed Governor-General of the Philippines	Jacob A. Cantor (D)	November 4, 1913
Massachusetts 3rd	William Wilder (R)	Died September 11, 1913	Calvin Paige (R)	November 4, 1913
Georgia 2nd	Seaborn Roddenbery (D)	Died September 25, 1913	Frank Park (D)	November 4, 1913
Iowa 2nd	Irvin S. Pepper (D)	Died December 22, 1913	Henry Vollmer (D)	February 10, 1914
Massachusetts 12th	James Michael Curley (D)	Resigned February 4, 1914, after being elected Mayor of Boston	James A. Gallivan (D)	April 7, 1914
New Jersey 7th	Robert G. Bremner (D)	Died February 5, 1914	Dow H. Drukker (R)	April 7, 1914
Alabama 8th	William N. Richardson (D)	Died March 31, 1914	Christopher C. Harris (D)	May 11, 1914
Alabama 3rd	Henry D. Clayton Jr. (D)	Resigned May 25, 1914, after being appointed judge for U.S. District Court for Middle and Northern Districts of Alabama	William O. Mulkey (D)	June 29, 1914
Missouri 12th	Leonidas C. Dyer (R)	Lost contested election June 9, 1914	Michael J. Gill (D)	June 9, 1914
Illinois 4th	James T. McDermott (D)	Resigned July 21, 1914	Seat remained vacant until next Congress	
Ohio 14th	William G. Sharp (D)	Resigned July 23, 1914, after being appointed United States Ambassador to France	Seat remained vacant until next Congress	
Massachusetts 11th	Andrew J. Peters (D)	Resigned August 15, 1914, after being appointed Assistant Secretary of the Treasury	Seat remained vacant until next Congress	
Massachusetts 10th	William F. Murray (D)	Resigned September 28, 1914, after being appointed Postmaster of Boston	Seat remained vacant until next Congress	
Maryland 1st	J. Harry Covington (D)	Resigned September 30, 1914, after being appointed to serve as chief justice of the United States District Court for the District of Columbia	Jesse Price (D)	November 3, 1914
New Jersey 9th	Walter I. McCoy (D)	Resigned October 3, 1914, after being appointed associate justice for the United States District Court for the District of Columbia	Richard W. Parker (R)	December 1, 1914
Georgia 10th	Thomas W. Hardwick (D)	Resigned November 2, 1914, after being elected to the U.S. Senate	Carl Vinson (D)	November 3, 1914
New York 36th	Sereno E. Payne (R)	Died December 10, 1914	Seat remained vacant until next Congress	
New York 31st	Edwin A. Merritt (R)	Died December 14, 1914	Seat remained vacant until next Congress	
New York 2nd	Denis O'Leary (D)	Resigned December 31, 1914	Seat remained vacant until next Congress	
Minnesota 2nd	Winfield Scott Hammond (D)	Resigned January 6, 1915, after being elected Governor of Minnesota	Seat remained vacant until next Congress	
Ohio 5th	Timothy T. Ansberry (D)	Resigned January 9, 1915, after being appointed associate justice of the Ohio Court of Appeals	Seat remained vacant until next Congress	
Ohio 8th	Frank B. Willis (R)	Resigned January 9, 1915, after being elected Governor of Ohio	Seat remained vacant until next Congress	
New Jersey 8th	Eugene F. Kinkead (D)	Resigned February 4, 1915, after becoming sheriff of Hudson County, New Jersey	Seat remained vacant until next Congress	

== Committees ==
Lists of committees and their party leaders for members of the House and Senate committees can be found through the Official Congressional Directory at the bottom of this article. The directory after the pages of terms of service lists committees of the Senate, House (Standing with Subcommittees, Select and Special) and Joint and, after that, House/Senate committee assignments. On the committees section of the House and Senate in the Official Congressional Directory, the committee's members on the first row on the left side shows the chairman of the committee and on the right side shows the ranking member of the committee.

=== Senate ===
- Additional Accommodations for the Library of Congress (Select) (Chairman: Boies Penrose; Ranking Member: William J. Stone)
- Agriculture and Forestry (Chairman: Thomas P. Gore; Ranking Member: Francis E. Warren)
- Appropriations (Chairman: Thomas S. Martin; Ranking Member: Francis E. Warren)
- Audit and Control the Contingent Expenses of the Senate (Chairman: John S. Williams; Ranking Member: William P. Dillingham)
- Banking and Currency (Chairman: Robert L. Owen; Ranking Member: Knute Nelson)
- Canadian Relations (Chairman: John K. Shields; Ranking Member: George T. Oliver)
- Census (Chairman: William E. Chilton; Ranking Member: Robert M. La Follette)
- Civil Service and Retrenchment (Chairman: Atlee Pomerene; Ranking Member: Albert B. Cummins)
- Claims (Chairman: Nathan P. Bryan; Ranking Member: Coe I. Crawford)
- Coast and Insular Survey (Chairman: Willard Saulsbury; Ranking Member: Charles E. Townsend)
- Coast Defenses (Chairman: James E. Martine; Ranking Member: Henry A. du Pont)
- Commerce (Chairman: James P. Clarke; Ranking Member: Knute Nelson)
- Conservation of National Resources (Chairman: James K. Vardaman; Ranking Member: Clarence D. Clark)
- Corporations Organized in the District of Columbia (Chairman: Robert M. La Follette; Ranking Member: William J. Stone)
- Cuban Relations (Chairman: Joseph L. Bristow then Oscar Underwood; Ranking Member: N/A)
- Disposition of Useless Papers in the Executive Departments (Chairman: Carroll S. Page; Ranking Member: Harry Lane)
- District of Columbia (Chairman: John W. Smith; Ranking Member: William P. Dillingham)
- Education and Labor (Chairman: Hoke Smith; Ranking Member: William E. Borah)
- Engrossed Bills (Chairman: Francis E. Warren; Ranking Member: Furnifold M. Simmons)
- Enrolled Bills (Chairman: Henry F. Hollis; Ranking Member: Isaac Stephenson)
- Establish a University in the United States (Select) (Chairman: William P. Dillingham; Ranking Member: Lee S. Overman)
- Examine the Several Branches in the Civil Service (Chairman: William A. Smith; Ranking Member: Luke Lea)
- Expenditures in the Department of Agriculture (Chairman: Morris Sheppard; Ranking Member: Henry F. Lippitt)
- Expenditures in the Department of Commerce and Labor (Chairman: William H. Thompson; Ranking Member: Albert B. Fall)
- Expenditures in the Interior Department (Chairman: Reed Smoot; Ranking Member: Claude A. Swanson)
- Expenditures in the Department of Justice (Chairman: George Sutherland; Ranking Member: Key Pittman)
- Expenditures in the Navy Department (Chairman: William Hughes; Ranking Member: Asle Gronna)
- Expenditures in the Post Office Department (Chairman: Blair Lee; Ranking Member: Joseph L. Bristow)
- Expenditures in the Department of State (Chairman: J. Hamilton Lewis; Ranking Member: William P. Jackson)
- Expenditures in the Treasury Department (Chairman: Joseph T. Robinson; Ranking Member: Theodore E. Burton)
- Expenditures in the War Department (Chairman: Miles Poindexter; Ranking Member: Harry Lane)
- Finance (Chairman: Furnifold M. Simmons; Ranking Member: Boies Penrose)
- Fisheries (Chairman: John R. Thornton; Ranking Member: John D. Works)
- Five Civilized Tribes of Indians (Chairman: Knute Nelson; Ranking Member: Benjamin R. Tillman)
- Foreign Relations (Chairman: Augustus O. Bacon; Ranking Member: Henry Cabot Lodge)
- Forest Reservations and the Protection of Game (Chairman: Harry Lane; Ranking Member: George P. McLean)
- Geological Survey (Chairman: Clarence D. Clark; Ranking Member: John W. Kern)
- Immigration (Chairman: Ellison D. Smith; Ranking Member: Henry Cabot Lodge)
- Indian Affairs (Chairman: William J. Stone; Ranking Member: Moses E. Clapp)
- Indian Depredations (Chairman: William E. Borah; Ranking Member: Claude A. Swanson)
- Industrial Expositions (Chairman: Henry F. Ashurst; Ranking Member: Elihu Root)
- Interoceanic Canals (Chairman: James A. O'Gorman; Ranking Member: Frank B. Brandegee)
- Interstate Commerce (Chairman: Francis G. Newlands; Ranking Member: Moses E. Clapp)
- Irrigation and Reclamation of Arid Lands (Chairman: Marcus A. Smith; Ranking Member: Wesley L. Jones)
- Judiciary (Chairman: Charles A. Culberson; Ranking Member: Clarence D. Clark)
- Library (Chairman: Luke Lea; Ranking Member: George T. Oliver)
- Manufactures (Chairman: James A. Reed; Ranking Member: George T. Oliver)
- Military Affairs (Chairman: George E. Chamberlain; Ranking Member: Henry A. du Pont)
- Mines and Mining (Chairman: Thomas J. Walsh; Ranking Member: Miles Poindexter)
- Mississippi River and its Tributaries (Select) (Chairman: Albert B. Cummins; Ranking Member: John Sharp Williams)
- National Banks (Chairman: Charles F. Johnson; Ranking Member: James H. Brady)
- Naval Affairs (Chairman: Benjamin R. Tillman; Ranking Member: George C. Perkins)
- Pacific Islands and Puerto Rico (Chairman: John F. Shafroth; Ranking Member: Miles Poindexter)
- Pacific Railroads (Chairman: Frank B. Brandegee; Ranking Member: Benjamin F. Shively)
- Patents (Chairman: Ollie M. James; Ranking Member: Benjamin R. Tillman)
- Pensions (Chairman: Benjamin F. Shively; Ranking Member: Porter J. McCumber)
- Philippines (Chairman: Gilbert M. Hitchcock; Ranking Member: Joseph L. Bristow)
- Post Office and Post Roads (Chairman: John H. Bankhead; Ranking Member: Boies Penrose)
- Printing (Chairman: Duncan U. Fletcher; Ranking Member: Reed Smoot)
- Private Land Claims (Chairman: Henry Cabot Lodge; Ranking Member: Augustus O. Bacon)
- Privileges and Elections (Chairman: John W. Kern; Ranking Member: William P. Dillingham)
- Public Buildings and Grounds (Chairman: Claude A. Swanson)
- Public Health and National Quarantine (Chairman: Joseph E. Ransdell; Ranking Member: Reed Smoot)
- Public Lands (Chairman: Henry L. Myers; Ranking Member: Reed Smoot)
- Railroads (Chairman: George C. Perkins; Ranking Member: James P. Clarke)
- Revision of the Laws (Chairman: Joseph T. Robinson; Ranking Member: George Sutherland)
- Revolutionary Claims (Chairman: William O. Bradley; Ranking Member: Francis G. Newlands)
- Rules (Chairman: Lee S. Overman; Ranking Member: Francis E. Warren)
- Standards, Weights and Measures (Chairman: Moses E. Clapp; Ranking Member: John H. Bankhead)
- Tariff Regulation (Select)
- Telepost (Select)
- Territories (Chairman: Key Pittman; Ranking Member: Knute Nelson)
- Transportation and Sale of Meat Products (Select) (Chairman: Henry A. du Pont; Ranking Member: Henry F. Hollis)
- Transportation Routes to the Seaboard (Chairman: Porter J. McCumber; Ranking Member: Morris Sheppard)
- Trespassers upon Indian Lands (Select) (Chairman: Isaac Stephenson; Ranking Member: John W. Smith)
- Whole
- Woman Suffrage (Chairman: Charles S. Thomas; Ranking Member: George Sutherland)

=== House of Representatives ===
- Accounts (Chairman: James T. Lloyd; Ranking Member: James A. Hughes)
- Agriculture (Chairman: Asbury F. Lever; Ranking Member: Gilbert N. Haugen)
- Alcoholic Liquor Traffic (Chairman: Adolph J. Sabath; Ranking Member: Andrew J. Barchfeld)
- Appropriations (Chairman: John J. Fitzgerald; Ranking Member: Frederick H. Gillett)
- Banking and Currency (Chairman: Carter Glass; Ranking Member: Everis A. Hayes)
- Census (Chairman: Harvey Helm; Ranking Member: Asher C. Hinds)
- Claims (Chairman: Edward W. Pou; Ranking Member: Luther W. Mott)
- Coinage, Weights and Measures (Chairman: Thomas W. Hardwick; Ranking Member: Luther W. Mott)
- Disposition of Executive Papers (Chairman: J. Frederick Cockey Talbott; Ranking Member: Patrick H. Kelley)
- District of Columbia (Chairman: Ben Johnson; Ranking Member: William J. Cary)
- Education (Chairman: Dudley M. Hughes; Ranking Member: James F. Burke)
- Election of the President, Vice President and Representatives in Congress (Chairman: William W. Rucker; Ranking Member: William D. B. Ainey)
- Elections No.#1 (Chairman: James D. Post; Ranking Member: Burton L. French)
- Elections No.#2 (Chairman: James A. Hammil; Ranking Member: William H. Stafford)
- Elections No.#3 (Chairman: Henry M. Goldfogle; Ranking Member: John C. McKenzie)
- Enrolled Bills (Chairman: William A. Ashbrook; Ranking Member: Simeon D. Fess)
- Expenditures in the Agriculture Department (Chairman: Robert L. Doughton; Ranking Member: Charles H. Sloan)
- Expenditures in the Commerce Department (Chairman: John H. Rothermel; Ranking Member: Bird Segle McGuire)
- Expenditures in the Interior Department (Chairman: James M. Graham; Ranking Member: Franklin W. Mondell)
- Expenditures in the Justice Department (Chairman: Robert F. Broussard; Ranking Member: Stephen G. Porter)
- Expenditures in the Labor Department (Chairman: James P. Maher; Ranking Member: Halvor Steenerson)
- Expenditures in the Navy Department (Chairman: Rufus Hardy; Ranking Member: John W. Langley)
- Expenditures in the Post Office Department (Chairman: N/A; Ranking Member: Daniel R. Anthony Jr.)
- Expenditures in the State Department (Chairman: Courtney W. Hamlin; Ranking Member: Willis C. Hawley)
- Expenditures in the Treasury Department (Chairman: Charles O. Lobeck; Ranking Member: Dick Thompson Morgan)
- Expenditures in the War Department (Chairman: John A.M. Adair; Ranking Member: Ernest W. Roberts)
- Expenditures on Public Buildings (Chairman: Thomas F. Konop; Ranking Member: John J. Esch)
- Foreign Affairs (Chairman: Henry D. Flood; Ranking Member: Henry Allen Cooper)
- Immigration and Naturalization (Chairman: John L. Burnett; Ranking Member: Augustus P. Gardner)
- Indian Affairs (Chairman: John H. Stephens; Ranking Member: Charles H. Burke)
- Industrial Arts and Expositions (Chairman: Edwin S. Underhill; Ranking Member: Frank P. Woods)
- Insular Affairs (Chairman: William A. Jones; Ranking Member: Horace M. Towner)
- Interstate and Foreign Commerce (Chairman: William C. Adamson; Ranking Member: Frederick C. Stevens)
- Invalid Pensions (Chairman: Isaac R. Sherwood; Ranking Member: J.N. Langham)
- Irrigation of Arid Lands (Chairman: William R. Smith; Ranking Member: Moses P. Kinkaid)
- Judiciary (Chairman: Henry De Lamar Clayton; Ranking Member: Andrew J. Volstead)
- Labor (Chairman: David J. Lewis; Ranking Member: John M. C. Smith)
- Library (Chairman: James L. Slayden; Ranking Member: Richard Bartholdt)
- Merchant Marine and Fisheries (Chairman: Joshua W. Alexander; Ranking Member: William S. Greene)
- Mileage (Chairman: Warren W. Bailey; Ranking Member: Charles A. Kennedy)
- Military Affairs (Chairman: James Hay; Ranking Member: Julius Kahn)
- Mines and Mining (Chairman: Martin D. Foster; Ranking Member: Joseph Howell)
- Naval Affairs (Chairman: Lemuel P. Padgett; Ranking Member: Thomas S. Butler)
- Patents (Chairman: William A. Oldfield; Ranking Member: Hunter H. Moss Jr.)
- Pensions (Chairman: John A. Key; Ranking Member: Sam R. Sells)
- Post Office and Post Roads (Chairman: John A. Moon; Ranking Member: Samuel W. Smith)
- Printing (Chairman: Henry A. Barnhart; Ranking Member: Edgar R. Kiess)
- Public Buildings and Grounds (Chairman: Henry A. Barnhart; Ranking Member: Richard W. Austin)
- Public Lands (Chairman: Frank Clark; Ranking Member: Irvine L. Lenroot)
- Railways and Canals (Chairman: Martin Dies; Ranking Member: William L. La Follette)
- Reform in the Civil Service (Chairman: Hannibal L. Godwin; Ranking Member: George C. Scott)
- Revision of Laws (Chairman: John T. Watkins; Ranking Member: Edwin A. Merritt)
- Rivers and Harbors (Chairman: Stephen M. Sparkman; Ranking Member: William E. Humphrey)
- Roads (Chairman: Dorsey W. Shackleford; Ranking Member: C. Bascom Slemp)
- Rules (Chairman: Robert L. Henry; Ranking Member: Philip P. Campbell)
- Standards of Official Conduct
- Territories (Chairman: William C. Houston; Ranking Member: Frank E. Guernsey)
- War Claims (Chairman: Alexander W. Gregg; Ranking Member: Frank Plumley)
- Ways and Means (Chairman: Oscar Underwood; Ranking Member: Sereno E. Payne)
- Whole

=== Joint committees ===
- Armor Plant Costs (Special)
- Conditions of Indian Tribes (Special)
- Federal Aid in Construction of Post Roads (Chairman: Sen. Jonathan Bourne Jr.; Vice Chairman: Rep. Dorsey W. Shackleford)
- Disposition of (Useless) Executive Papers
- The Library (Chairman: Sen. John Sharp Williams)
- Interstate Commerce (Chairman: Sen. Francis G. Newlands)
- Investigate the General Parcel Post (Chairman: Sen. Joseph L. Bristow; Vice Chairman: Rep. David E. Finley)
- Printing (Chairman: Sen. Duncan U. Fletcher)
- Postage on 2nd Class Mail Matter and Compensation for Transportation of Mail (Chairman: Sen. Jonathan Bourne Jr.)
- Rural Credits (Chairman: Rep. Carter Glass)
- Second Class Mail Matter and Compensation for Rail Mail Service

== Caucuses ==
- Democratic (House)
- Democratic (Senate)

== Employees ==
=== Legislative branch agency directors ===
- Architect of the Capitol: Elliott Woods
- Librarian of Congress: Herbert Putnam
- Public Printer of the United States: Samuel B. Donnelly, until 1913
  - Cornelius Ford, from 1913

=== Senate ===
- Secretary: Charles G. Bennett, until March 13, 1913.
  - James M. Baker, elected March 13, 1913.
- E. Livingston Cornelius, elected December 10, 1912
  - Charles P. Higgins, elected March 13, 1913
- Chaplain: Edward Everett Hale, Unitarian, until March 13, 1913
  - F.J. Prettyman, Methodist, elected March 13, 1913.

=== House of Representatives ===
- Clerk: South Trimble
- Sergeant at Arms: Charles F. Riddell, until April 7, 1913
  - Robert B. Gordon, from April 7, 1913
- Doorkeeper: Joseph J. Sinnott
- Postmaster: William M. Dunbar
- Clerk at the Speaker's Table: Bennett C. Clark
- Reading Clerks: Patrick Joseph Haltigan (D) and H. Martin Williams (R)
- Chaplain: Henry N. Couden, Universalist

== See also ==
- 1912 United States elections (elections leading to this Congress)
  - 1912 United States presidential election
  - 1912–13 United States Senate elections
  - 1912 United States House of Representatives elections
- 1914 United States elections (elections during this Congress, leading to the next Congress)
  - 1914 United States Senate elections
  - 1914 United States House of Representatives elections
