= Charles S. Joelson =

American lawyer and politician (1916–1999)

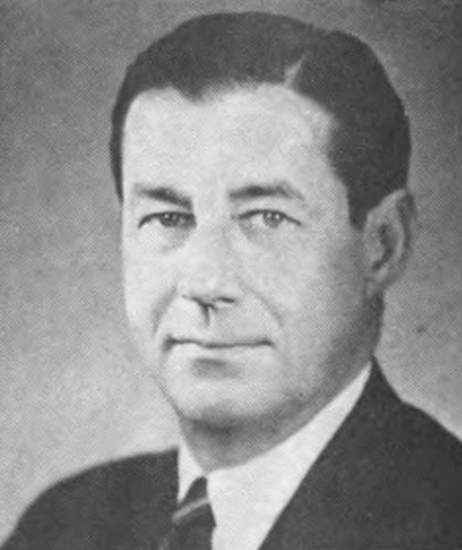

Member of the U.S. House of Representatives from New Jersey's 8th district
- In office January 3, 1961 – September 4, 1969
- Preceded by: Gordon Canfield
- Succeeded by: Robert A. Roe

Personal details
- Born: Charles Samuel Joelson; January 27, 1916 Paterson, New Jersey, US
- Died: August 17, 1999 (aged 83) Freehold Township, New Jersey, U.S.
- Party: Democratic
- Education: Cornell University (BA, LLB)

Military service
- Branch/service: United States Navy
- Years of service: 1942-1945
- Rank: Ensign
- Unit: Office of Naval Intelligence
- Battles/wars: World War II

Charles Samuel Joelson (January 27, 1916 – August 17, 1999) was an American lawyer and politician. Joelson, a Democrat, succeeded Gordon Canfield as the representative for New Jersey's 8th district for eight years, lasting from 1961 until his resignation on September 4, 1969, when he became a judge in the Superior Court of New Jersey.

== Background ==
Joelson was born and raised in a Jewish family in Paterson, New Jersey. After graduating from Montclair Academy, he went on to college and attended Cornell University. After graduating Phi Beta Kappa with a Bachelor of Arts degree in 1937, Joelson went to attend the university's law school. He graduated with a Bachelor of Laws degree in 1939, and was admitted to the bar in 1940. He first started his law practice in Paterson, New Jersey and continued until he enlisted in the United States Navy in 1942.

=== World War II ===
During World War II, Joelson served as an ensign in the Far Eastern Branch of the Office of Naval Intelligence, where he learned and mastered the Japanese language.

=== Early political career ===
After the war, Joelson first ran for the House seat in New Jersey's 8th congressional district against incumbent Gordon Canfield. In a close election, Canfield captured 59,191 votes, just 148 more than Joelson, and was proclaimed the winner of the election. Joelson then served on Paterson's city counsel from 1949 to 1952.

== Politics and superior court ==
He then served as deputy Attorney General in New Jersey's criminal investigation division for three years, starting in 1954. That same year, he again ran for the representative seat for New Jersey's 8th district, but again lost to incumbent Gordon Canfield. Joelson received 45.1% of the vote, in comparison to Canfield's 54.8%. Afterwards, Joelson then went on to the Passaic County's Prosecutor's Office and then became the director of the state's criminal investigation division and served that post from 1958 to 1960.

=== Congress ===
He won the seat for New Jersey's 8th District's in the November 1960 election. Canfield was not a candidate for renomination in 1960, and so Joelson was pitted against Republican Walter P. Kennedy. Joelson won the election by nearly 14,000 votes, capturing a 52%-43.8% majority. He was sworn into the United States Congress on January 3, 1961. As Congressman, one of Joelson's achievements was a piece of legislation in 1969 that saved many school libraries. The legislation appropriated over a billion dollars for public school libraries, remedial programs and guidance counseling.

=== Jurist ===
After his resignation, then-state cabinet member Robert A. Roe was elected as a Democrat by special election on November 4, 1969, to fill the vacancy left by Joelson. Joelson had asked the state's governor at the time, Richard J. Hughes for a seat in the New Jersey Superior Court. He served on the bench for fifteen years, spending time in the Chancery Division and the Appellate Division, before retiring in 1984.

== Death ==
A resident of Paramus, Joelson died at the age of 83 in Freehold Township, New Jersey on August 17, 1999.

== See also ==
- List of Jewish members of the United States Congress

U.S. House of Representatives
| Preceded by Gordon Canfield | Member of the U.S. House of Representatives from New Jersey's 8th congressional district 1961 - 1969 | Succeeded by Robert A. Roe |
