= Cutter Service Act =

United States federal law

- Other short titles: Cutter Service Act, 1914
- Long title: An Act to provide for the construction of two revenue cutters.
- Nicknames: Revenue Cutters Service Act of 1914
- Enacted by: the 63rd United States Congress
- Effective: June 24, 1914

Citations
- Public law: Pub. L. 63–118
- Statutes at Large: 38 Stat. 387

Legislative history
- Introduced in the Senate as S. 4377 by John H. Bankhead (D–AL) on February 5, 1914; Passed the Senate on April 28, 1914 (Passed); Passed the House on May 13, 1914 (Passed); Signed into law by President Woodrow Wilson on June 24, 1914

Cutter Service Act, 1914 is a United States federal statute authorizing the construction of two revenue cutter vessels as related to medical and surgical relief for American vessel crews engaged in the deep-sea fisheries. The two revenue cutters provided a class of service as a steam-powered vessel encompassing the coastal geography of the Gulf of Mexico and Maine.

The act of Congress emphasized providing otherwise-unobtainable medical services for seamen on board American fishing fleets. It authorized the commandant of the Revenue Cutter Service to "detail for duty on revenue cutters such surgeons and other persons of the Public Health Service as ... necessary."

As a result of the act, many cutter vessels were fitted out as hospital ships and "relieved from the regular duties as normally performed by cutters" to cruise the fishing banks off the U.S. coastlines as floating hospitals.

== See also ==
- USRC Mohawk
- USCGC Seneca (1908)
- USRC Tahoma
