= Charles Pearce Coady =

American politician (1868–1934)

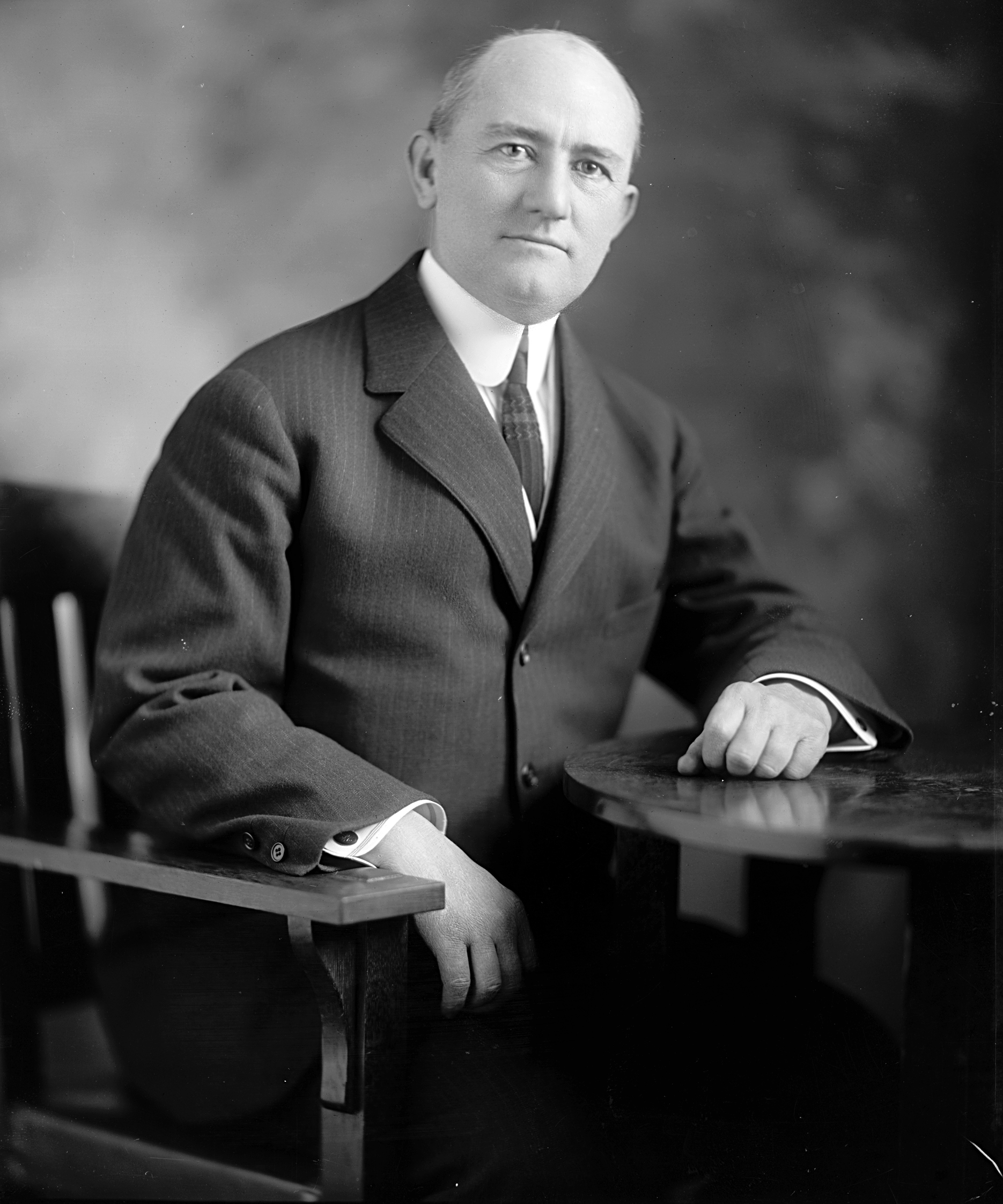

Member of the U.S. House of Representatives from Maryland's 3rd district
- In office November 4, 1913 – March 3, 1921
- Preceded by: George Konig
- Succeeded by: John Boynton Philip Clayton Hill

Member of the Maryland Senate from the 1st Baltimore city district
- In office 1908–1912

Personal details
- Born: February 22, 1868 Baltimore, U.S.
- Died: February 16, 1934 (aged 65) Baltimore, U.S.
- Party: Democratic
- Education: Baltimore City College; Baltimore School of Law

Charles Pearce Coady (February 22, 1868 – February 16, 1934) was a U.S. representative from the third district of Maryland.

== Early life ==
Charles Pearce Coady was born on February 22, 1868, in Baltimore, Maryland, to Mary (née Lyons) and Michael Coady. Coady attended the public schools and graduated from Baltimore City College in 1886. He also graduated from the Baltimore School of Law. Following graduation, Coady took up work as a merchant. In 1894, after finishing his legal studies, he was admitted to the bar in 1894 and began practicing law in Baltimore.

== Career ==
Coady worked as director and counsel of St. James' Savings Bank. He served as counsel for five other associations. He was also director of St. Vincent's Orphan Asylum.

Coady served in the Maryland State Senate from 1908 to 1912 from the 1st legislative district of Baltimore city. He won a second term in office, but resigned in 1913 in order to run for the U.S. House of Representatives. Coady was elected to 63rd United States Congress as a Democrat, filling the vacancy caused by the death of George Konig. He was reelected to the U.S. House of Representatives three times. In 1920, Coady ran for a fifth term, but was defeated by John Boynton Philip Clayton Hill. He served, in total, from November 4, 1913, to March 3, 1921. After his defeat Coady returned to practicing law in Baltimore. From 1922 to 1925, Coady served as Baltimore City collector and manager of the bureau of receipts.

== Personal life ==
Coady died on February 16, 1934, in Baltimore, and was interred in New Cathedral Cemetery.

U.S. House of Representatives
Preceded by George Konig	U.S. Congressman from the 3rd district of Maryland; 1913–1921	Succeeded by John Boynton Philip Clayton Hill
