= Urgent Deficiencies Act =

1913 United States law

- Long title: An Act making appropriations to supply urgent deficiencies in appropriations for the fiscal year nineteen hundred and thirteen, and for other purposes.
- Enacted by: the 63rd United States Congress
- Effective: October 22, 1913

Citations
- Statutes at Large: 38 Stat. 208

Legislative history
- Passed the House on; Passed the Senate on; Signed into law by President Woodrow Wilson on October 22, 1913

The Urgent Deficiencies Act of 1913 was one of a series of laws passed by the 63rd United States Congress authorizing courts to review agency action. Specifically, it authorized three-judge district courts to "set aside" any order of the Interstate Commerce Commission (ICC).

== Legislation ==
As part of the legislation, all information relating to the United States Post Office Department, including the statement of allowances to mail contractors, was removed from the Official Register. The list of ships and vessels belonging to the United States was eliminated as well. The bill also declared that Federal district courts would have jurisdiction in cases brought to enjoin, set aside, annul, or suspend in whole or in part any order of the Interstate Commerce Commission (ICC). Put another way, I.C.C. orders and enforcements were now subject to Federal district court review, and the special Commerce Court of the I.C.C. was abolished. Such cases would be decided upon by specially constituted three-judge panels that would hear and decide on the merits of the arguments for or against enforcement.

== Amendments ==
The district court right of review portion of the act was repealed in 1975. There was also a rider attached to the bill that abolished nepotism within the Bureau of Internal Revenue and Treasury Department, added after Treasury Secretary McAdoo was accused of appointing 5 family members under the name "Eisner."
