= Robert G. Bremner =

American politician

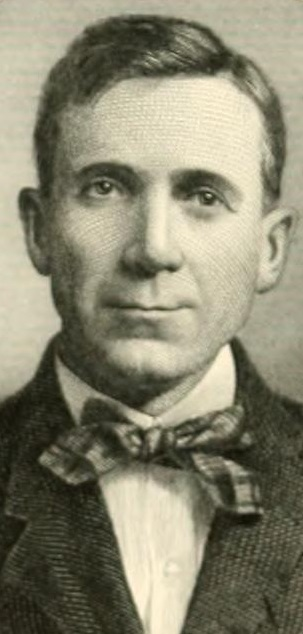

Member of the U.S. House of Representatives from New Jersey's 7th district
- In office March 4, 1913 – February 5, 1914
- Preceded by: Edward W. Townsend
- Succeeded by: Dow H. Drukker

Personal details
- Born: Robert Gunn Bremner; December 17, 1874 Reiss, Scotland
- Died: February 5, 1914 (aged 39) Baltimore, Maryland, U.S.
- Resting place: Laurel Grove Memorial Park in Totowa, New Jersey
- Party: Democratic

Robert Gunn Bremner (December 17, 1874 – February 5, 1914) was an American newspaper publisher and Democratic Party politician who represented New Jersey's 7th congressional district in the United States House of Representatives from 1913 to 1914.

== Biography ==
Bremner was born in Reiss, Scotland on December 17, 1874. His family migrated to Orangeville, Ontario, Canada, where he attended public schools and worked on his family's farm and as a school teacher.

He moved to New York City in 1893, and worked as a carpenter and electrician. He later worked as a reporter for several newspapers in Paterson, New Jersey.

=== Spanish-American War ===
He served with the Second Regiment of New Jersey Volunteer Infantry during the Spanish–American War.

=== Newspaper owner ===
In 1902 Bremner became the owner and publisher of the Passaic Herald.

=== Congress ===
Bremner was elected as a Democrat to the Sixty-third Congress, serving from March 4, 1913 until his death.

=== Death ===
In December, 1913 Bremner checked into a hospital in Baltimore, Maryland to be treated for cancer of the neck and shoulder. He did not recover, and died in Baltimore on February 5, 1914. He was interred at Laurel Grove Memorial Park in Totowa, New Jersey.

== See also ==
- Politics of New Jersey
- List of members of the United States Congress who died in office (1900–1949)

U.S. House of Representatives
Preceded by Edward W. Townsend	Member of the U.S. House of Representatives from New Jersey's 7th congressional district March 4, 1913 – February 5, 1914	Succeeded by Dow H. Drukker
