= Agricultural Entry Act =

- Long title: An Act to provide for agricultural entry of lands withdrawn, classified, or reported as containing phosphate, nitrate, potash, oil, gas, or asphaltic minerals.
- Nicknames: Agricultural Entry Act of 1914
- Enacted by: the 63rd United States Congress
- Effective: July 17, 1914

Citations
- Public law: Pub. L. 63–128
- Statutes at Large: 38 Stat. 509, Chap. 142

Legislative history
- Introduced in the Senate as S. 60; Signed into law by President Woodrow Wilson on July 17, 1914

The Agricultural Entry Act allowed Federal lands containing minerals, petroleum, nitrate, phosphate, potash, oil, gas, and asphalt to be leased to private developers, as long as such deposits in specially zoned lands were left alone. The Federal government reserved the right to abrogate whatever uses the surrounding lands had been developed for in the event that it was deemed necessary for deposit procurement.
