= Dow H. Drukker =

American politician (1872–1963)

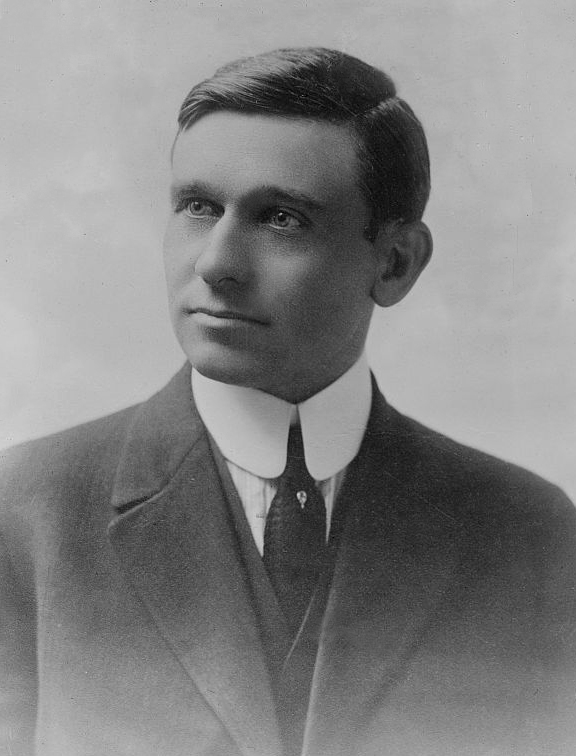

Member of the U.S. House of Representatives from New Jersey's 7th district
- In office April 7, 1914 – March 3, 1919
- Preceded by: Robert G. Bremner
- Succeeded by: Amos H. Radcliffe

Personal details
- Born: Dow Henry Drukker; February 7, 1872 Sneek, Netherlands
- Died: January 11, 1963 (aged 90) Lake Wales, Florida, U.S.
- Resting place: Cedar Lawn Cemetery in Paterson, New Jersey
- Party: Republican

Dow Henry Drukker (February 7, 1872 – January 11, 1963) was an American Republican Party politician from New Jersey who represented the state's 7th congressional district from 1914 to 1919.

== Biography ==
He was born in Sneek, Netherlands, and immigrated to the United States with his parents, who settled in Grand Rapids, Michigan the same year. He attended the public schools of Grand Rapids and then moved to New Jersey in 1897 and settled in Passaic, New Jersey. He worked as a businessman and banker and served as a member of the Passaic County Board of Chosen Freeholders from 1906–1913, serving as director 1908-1912.

=== Congress ===
Drukker was elected as a Republican to the Sixty-third Congress to fill the vacancy caused by the death of Robert Gunn Bremner. He was reelected to the Sixty-fourth and Sixty-fifth Congresses and served from April 7, 1914, to March 3, 1919. He was not a candidate for renomination in 1918.

=== Later career ===
After leaving Congress, he was the publisher of the Herald-News of Passaic-Clifton 1916-1963 and became president of the Union Building and Investment Co., in 1909. He was knighted as an Officer of the Order of Orange-Nassau by Queen Juliana for services rendered in the great flood of 1953.

=== Death and burial ===
He resided in Clifton, New Jersey and Lake Wales, Florida until his death in Lake Wales in 1963. He was buried in Cedar Lawn Cemetery in Paterson, New Jersey.

U.S. House of Representatives
Preceded by Robert G. Bremner	Member of the U.S. House of Representatives from New Jersey's 7th congressional district April 7, 1914 – March 3, 1919	Succeeded by Amos H. Radcliffe
