= Cooperative Funds Act =

- Long title: An Act Making appropriations for the Department of Agriculture for the fiscal year ending June thirtieth, nineteen hundred and fifteen
- Enacted by: the 63rd United States Congress
- Effective: June 30, 1914

Citations
- Public law: Public Law 63-131
- Statutes at Large: 38 Stat. 415

Codification
- U.S.C. sections created: 16 U.S.C. § 498

Legislative history
- Introduced in the House of Representatives as H.R. 13679 by Asbury Francis Lever (D‑SC) on February 21, 1914; Committee consideration by House Committee on Agriculture; Passed the House of Representatives on March 3, 1914 (242–0); Passed the Senate on May 23, 1914 (Voice vote); Reported by the joint conference committee on June 22 – June 27, 1914; agreed to by the House of Representatives on June 27, 1914 (Voice vote) and by the Senate on June 29, 1914 (Voice vote); Signed into law by President Woodrow Wilson on June 30, 1914

Major amendments
- Federal Agriculture Improvement and Reform Act of 1996 (Public Law 104-127)

The Cooperative Funds Act is a United States law, or series of laws, which authorized the United States Forest Service (FS) to collect donations from private partners to perform FS work. Contributions had to be voluntary, and by cash, check, or money order only. It was also stipulated that there could be no conflict of interest between the donor and the FS.

== Federal acts ==
The FS must have appropriate statutory authority prior to entering into any grant, cooperative agreement, or other agreement which could result in the use, obligation, or other commitment of any Forest Service resources. To this end, the Congress has passed several authorizations, including:

- The Economy Act of June 30, 1932 (31 USC 1535, Public Law 97-258 and 98-216) - Section 601 of this Act authorizes one federal agency to requisition work, services, supplies, materials, or equipment from another federal agency.
- The Act of August 27, 1958 (23 USC 308(a), Public Law 85-767) - This Act authorizes the Federal Highway Administration to perform by contract or otherwise, authorized engineering or other services in connection with the survey, construction, maintenance, or improvement of highways on behalf of other government agencies.
- Intergovernmental Cooperation Act of 1968, as amended by the Intergovernmental Cooperation Act of September 13, 1982 (31 USC 6501 -6508, Public Law 97-258) - Title III of this Act authorizes FS to provide special or technical services to states or their political subdivisions.
- Federal Technology Transfer Act of 1986 (15 USC 3710a, Public Law 96-480) - This Act authorizes FS to enter into cooperative research and development agreements for technological transfer for commercial purposes.
- Federal Grants and Cooperative Agreements Act of 1977, as amended by the Using Procurement Contracts and Grant and Cooperative Agreements Act of September 13, 1982 (31 USC 6301-6308, Public Law 97-258) - Unless the relationship is otherwise specified by statute, this Act requires that federal agencies characterize the relationship between a federal and non-federal party as one of a procurement contract or of Federal Financial Assistance. The selection of a particular instrument, such as a procurement contract or an assistance instrument, to document the transaction is determined by this relationship.
- United States Information and Exchange Act (22 USC 1451 and 1479, Public Law 97-241) - This Act authorizes FS to cooperate with foreign governments by providing FS employees with specific technical or professional qualifications.
- Cooperative Funds Act of June 30, 1914 (16 USC 498 as amended by Public Law 104-127) - Authorizes FS to accept money received as contributions toward cooperative work in forest investigations or protection, management, and improvement of the National Forest System.
- Granger-Thye Act of April 24, 1950 (16 USC 572) - Section 5 of this Act authorizes FS to perform work to be done for the benefit of the depositor, for administration, protection, improvement, reforestation, and such other kinds of work as the Forest Service is authorized to do on lands of the United States: (a) on state, county, municipal, or private land within or near National Forest land, or (b) for others who occupy or use National Forests or other lands administered by FS.
- Acceptance of Gifts Act of October 10, 1978 (7 USC 2269, Public Law 95-442) - Authorizes FS acceptance of cash and donations of real personal property.
- Cooperative Funds and Deposits Act of December 12, 1975 (16 USC 565a1-a3, Public Law 94-148) - Authorizes FS and partners to perform work from which they would accrue mutual non-monetary benefit.
- Interior and Related Agencies Appropriations Act of 1992 (Public Law 102-154, (Challenge Cost Share)) - Authorizes FS to cooperate with others in developing, planning, and implementing mutually beneficial projects that enhance FS activities, where the partners provide matching funds or in-kind contributions. Partners may be public or private agencies, organizations, institutions, or individuals. The Act also gives the agency the authority to provide non-monetary awards and to incur necessary expenses for the non-monetary recognition of individuals and organizations.
- Title 7, United States Code, Section 2204a - Provides for the exchange of personnel and facilities in each field office of the Department of Agriculture to the extent necessary and desirable to achieve the most efficient use of personnel and facilities, and to provide the most effective assistance in the development of rural areas in accordance with state rural development plans.
- Federal Employees International Organization Service Act (5 USC 3343 and 3581-3584, as amended) - Authorizes FS to send employees to an international organization which requests services for a period not to exceed 5 years.
- National Agricultural Research, Extension, and Teaching Policy Act of 1977 (Public Law 95-113), as amended by the Food Security Act of 1985 (7 USC 3318, and 3319, Public Law 99-198) and further amended by Public Law 105-198 - Authorizes FS to enter into joint venture agreements with any entity or individual to serve the mutual interest of the parties in agricultural research and teaching activities, whereby all parties contribute resources to accomplish those objectives (7 USC 3318(b)). It also authorizes the FS to enter into cost-reimbursable agreements with state cooperative institutions or other colleges and universities without regard to any requirement for competition, for the acquisition of goods or services, including personal services, to carry out agricultural research or teaching activities of mutual interest (7 USC 3319(a).
- Youth Conservation Corps Act of 1970 (16 USC 1701-1706, 1723) as amended by the Title II, Public Land Corps Act of 1993 (Public Law 91-378) - Authorizes FS to utilize the Corps or any qualified youth or conservation corps to carry out conservation projects on public lands, Indian lands and Hawaiian homelands. Conservation projects may be carried out on state, local, or private lands as part of disaster prevention or relief efforts in response to an emergency or major disaster declared by the President.
- Volunteers in the National Forest Act of 1972, as amended (16 USC 558a – 558d, Public Law 92-300) - The FS is authorized to recruit, train, and accept individuals as volunteers for or in aid of interpretive functions, visitor services, conservation measures and development, or other activities in and related to areas administered by FS. Incidental expenses are authorized.
- Forest and Rangeland Renewable Resources Research Act of 1978, as amended (16 USC 1641-1646, Public Law 95-307) - Authorizes implementation of a program of forest and rangeland renewable resources research, dissemination of the research findings. It authorizes the acceptance and investing of gifts, donations and bequests.
- Cooperative Forestry Assistance Act of 1978, as amended (16 USC 2101-2114, Public Law 95-313) - Authorizes FS to work through and in cooperation with state foresters or equivalent agencies, and other countries in implementing technical programs affecting non-federal forest lands.
- National Forest Dependent Rural Communities Economic Diversification Act of 1990 (7 USC 6601 note, Public Law 101-624) - Title XXIII, Subtitle G, Rural Revitalization Through Forestry, authorizes FS establishment and implementation of educational programs and technical assistance to businesses, industries, and policy makers to create jobs, raise incomes, and increase public revenues in ways that are consistent with environmental concerns.
- America the Beautiful (16 USC 2101, Subtitle C, Public Law 101-624) - This law created the National Tree Trust, a nonprofit foundation, to promote public awareness and solicit private sector contributions to encourage tree planting projects. It allows FS to promote principles of basic forest stewardship, and to provide assistance to others to plant and maintain trees and improve forests in rural areas.
- The International Forestry Cooperation Act of 1990 (16 USC 4501, Public Law 101-513, as amended) - Authorizes FS cooperation and assistance with domestic and international organizations to further international programs which support global environmental stability, scientific exchange and educational opportunities, and technical and managerial expertise.
- Cooperative Law Enforcement Act of August 10, 1971 (16 USC 551a, Public Law 92-82) - Authorizes FS cooperation with state or their political subdivisions to enforce or supervise laws and ordinances of a state or political division on National Forest System lands.
- The Reciprocal Fire Act of May 27, 1955 (42 USC 1856a, Public Law 84-46) - Authorizes FS to make reciprocal agreements with any fire organization maintaining fire protection facilities in the vicinity of National Forest lands.
- National Forest Roads and Trails Act of October 13, 1964 (16 USC 532-538, Public Law 88-657) - Authorizes FS financing and cooperation with other public or private agencies or individuals, for acquisition, construction and maintenance of forest development roads within or near National Forests.
- National Trails System Act (16 USC 1246(h), Public Law 90-543) - Authorizes FS cooperation with states or their political subdivisions, landowners, private organizations or individuals, to operate, develop and maintain any portion of national trail system trails either inside or outside a federally administered area.
- Wild and Scenic Rivers Act (16 USC 1271 et seq., Public Law 90-542) - Authorizes FS cooperation with states or their political subdivisions, landowners, private organizations or individuals, to plan, protect and manage river resources.
- Federal Noxious Weed Act of 1974 (Public Law 93-629, 7 USC 2801 et seq., Public Law 101-624) - Title XIV, Subtitle D: Other Conservation Measures, authorizes FS to issue cooperative agreements with state agencies (or political subdivisions responsible for the administration or implementation of state laws regarding undesirable plants) for establishment of undesirable-plant management programs and integrated management systems to control undesirable plant species, and to issue cost-sharing cooperative agreements with agencies to manage noxious weeds in an area if a majority of landowners in that area agree to participate in a noxious weed program.
- National and Community Service Act of 1990 (42 USC 12501, Public Law 101-610) - Subtitle C, National Service Trust Program, establishes the Corporation for National Community Service, which may enter into contracts or cooperative agreements with federal agencies to support a national service program carried out by the agency.
- Sikes Act of September 1, 1960 (16 USC 670g-6701, 670o, Public Law 86-797, as amended) - Authorizes FS cooperation with state wildlife agencies in conservation programs for fish, wildlife, and plants considered threatened or endangered.
- Wyden Amendment (Watershed Restoration and Enhancement Agreements) - In accordance with specific statutory authorities, this law allows FS to make cooperative agreements with federal, tribal, state, and local governments, private and nonprofit entities, and landowners, to protect, restore, and enhance fish and wildlife habitat, as well as other resources on public or private land that benefit those resources within the watershed.

== Use of cooperative agreements ==
Cooperative agreements used may include the types of instruments contemplated under Section 1587.03 of the Forest Service Manual. Also, Federal Financial Assistance instruments (grants or cooperative agreements) may be used. Authority to use all these instruments is the Department of Interior and Related Agencies Appropriations Act, 1999, FSM 1587.15, FSH 1509.11, Chapter 60, Wyden Amendment, Section 323(A), as included in Public Law 105-277, Div. A, Section 101 (e) as amended by Public Law 107-63, Section 330.
