= River and Harbors Act of 1915 =

United States federal law

- Long title: An Act Making appropriations for the construction, repair, and preservation of certain public works on rivers and harbors, and for other purposes.
- Enacted by: the 63rd United States Congress
- Effective: March 4, 1915

Citations
- Statutes at Large: 38 Stat. 1049

Legislative history
- Introduced in the House as H.R. 20189 by D‑FL Stephen M. Sparkmanth on January 19, 1915; Committee consideration by House Committee on Rivers and Harbors; Passed the House on January 19, 1915 (164–81); Passed the Senate on March 2, 1915 (Voice vote); Reported by the joint conference committee on March 3, 1915; agreed to by the House on March 3, 1915 (Agreed to conference report) and by the Senate on March 3, 1915 (Agreed to conference report); Signed into law by President Woodrow Wilson on March 4, 1915

The River and Harbors Act of 1915 is an American law passed by the United States Congress in 1915. It provided federal funds for anchorage grounds to be built in various rivers and harbors around the country. Many projects were in Maine, Connecticut, New Jersey, and Maryland. The law was one of a series of River and Harbors Acts passed regularly by Congress between 1824 and 1970.

Several sections of the 1915 Act have not been superseded and are still in effect under U.S. Code Title 33, covering navigable waters. These include a provision allowing the Army Corps of Engineers to receive private donations towards river and harbor improvement projects, a section covering the definition of channel depths and dimensions, and Congress' permission for the elimination of Swan Creek in Toledo, Ohio, although this has not been carried out as of 2019.
