= Vincent L. Palmisano =

American politician

- Palmisano in 1937

Member of the U.S. House of Representatives from Maryland's 3rd district
- In office March 4, 1927 – January 3, 1939
- Preceded by: John Philip Hill
- Succeeded by: Thomas D'Alesandro Jr.

Personal details
- Born: Vincenzo Palmisano; August 5, 1882 Termini Imerese, Palermo, Kingdom of Italy
- Died: January 12, 1953 (aged 70) Baltimore, Maryland, U.S.
- Resting place: New Cathedral Cemetery
- Party: Democratic
- Education: University of Maryland, Baltimore

Vincent Luke Palmisano (August 5, 1882 – after January 12, 1953) was an American politician from Maryland.

== Biography ==
Born as Vincenzo Palmisano in Termini Imerese, Palermo in the Kingdom of Italy, to Cosimo Palmisano and Anna Maria Sansone Chiariano. Palmisano emigrated to the United States with his parents, who settled in Baltimore in 1887. He attended parochial schools and studied law at the University of Maryland, Baltimore. He was admitted to the bar in 1909 and commenced practice in Baltimore.

Palmisano served as a member of the Maryland House of Delegates in 1914 and 1915, as a member of the Baltimore City Council from 1915 to 1923, as a member of the Democratic State central committee of Baltimore from 1923 to 1927, and as police examiner of Baltimore from 1925-1927. In 1926, he was elected as a Democrat to the Seventieth and to the five succeeding Congresses, serving from March 4, 1927 to January 3, 1939. His re-election in 1928 was very close, winning by only 330 votes and was contested. While the committee report recommended that Palmisano was not elected due to irregularities in one precinct ("No attempt whatever was made by the election board to follow the law as to counting, recording, or certifying the vote in this precinct") and questions about his residency, the report was never acted on by the House.

In Congress, Palmisano served as chairman of the Committee on Education (Seventy-fourth and Seventy-fifth Congresses), and as a member of the Committee on the District of Columbia (Seventy-fifth Congress). He was an unsuccessful candidate for renomination in 1938. After his tenure in Congress, Palmisano resumed the practice of law and served on the Baltimore Zoning Board until his resignation in 1952.

Palmisano had been in ill health after an emergency appendectomy in the summer of 1952. He disappeared from his home on January 12, 1953, and his gloves were soon discovered at a pier along the Baltimore Inner Harbor. Suspecting suicide, the police and Coast Guard dragged the frigid waters of the harbor in search of his remains. On March 5, 1953, a body was recovered from the harbor and confirmed to be Palmisano by his landlady. He is interred in the New Cathedral Cemetery of Baltimore.

U.S. House of Representatives
Preceded by John Boynton Philip Clayton Hill	Member of the U.S. House of Representatives from Maryland's 3rd congressional district 1927–1939	Succeeded by Thomas D'Alesandro Jr.
