= Stanley E. Bowdle =

American lawyer and politician (1868–1919)

Stanley Eyre Bowdle
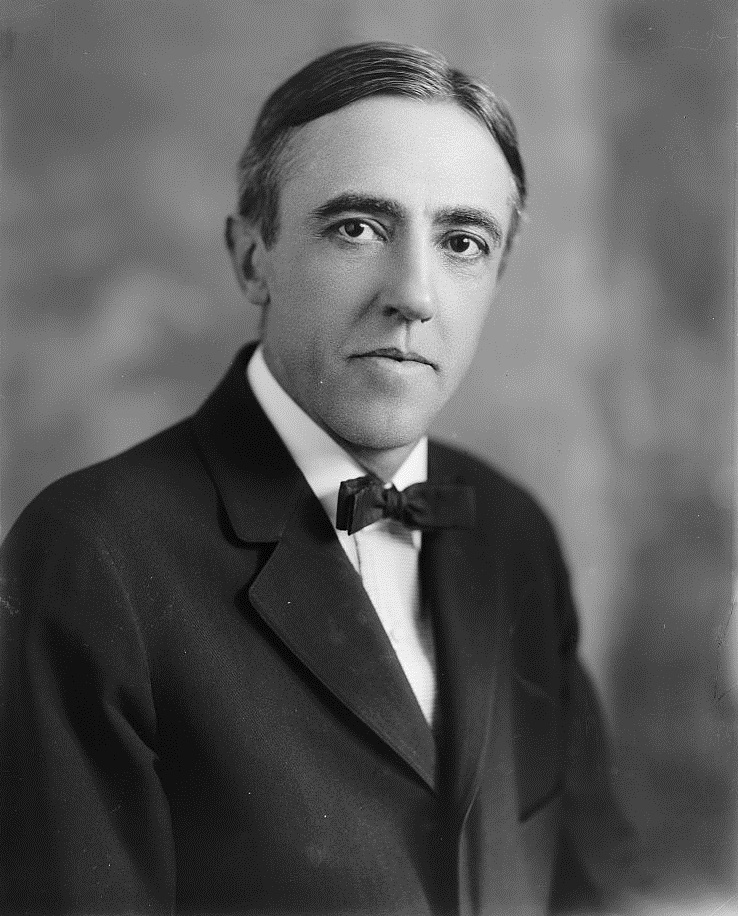

Member of the U.S. House of Representatives from Ohio's 1st district
- In office March 4, 1913 – March 3, 1915
- Preceded by: Nicholas Longworth
- Succeeded by: Nicholas Longworth

Personal details
- Born: September 4, 1868 Clifton, Cincinnati, Ohio
- Died: April 6, 1919 (aged 50) Cincinnati, Ohio
- Resting place: Spring Grove Cemetery
- Party: Democratic
- Spouse: Lillian Crane Scott
- Children: One daughter
- Education: Cincinnati Law School

Stanley Eyre Bowdle (September 4, 1868 – April 6, 1919) was an American lawyer and politician who served as a U.S. representative from Ohio for one term from 1913 to 1915.

== Early life and career ==
Born in Clifton, Cincinnati, Ohio, Bowdle attended the public schools until fifteen years of age. He served an apprenticeship of three years in the machine shops of Cramp's shipyard, Philadelphia, Pennsylvania. He studied law, and was graduated from the Cincinnati Law School in 1889. He was admitted to the bar the same year and commenced practice in Cincinnati.

He spent the summers in the mountains of Colorado and winters in various places in Mexico from 1897 to 1900 in an attempt to recover from tuberculosis. He married Lillian Crane Scott while still in Colorado on November 29, 1900. She had one daughter named Virginia.

He returned to Cincinnati and resumed his profession. He served as member of the State constitutional convention in 1912.

== Congress ==
Bowdle was elected as a Democrat to the Sixty-third Congress (March 4, 1913 – March 3, 1915). He was an unsuccessful candidate for reelection in 1914 to the Sixty-fourth Congress and in 1916 to the Sixty-fifth Congress.

== Later career and death ==
In later years, he became a member of the Episcopal Church.

He served as mayor of Clifton, Cincinnati, Ohio and engaged in the practice of law in Cincinnati.

He died there on April 6, 1919, a few hours after being struck by a motorist after stepping from a streetcar near the Good Samaritan Hospital.

He was interred in Spring Grove Cemetery.

== Sources ==
- United States Congress. "Stanley E. Bowdle (id: B000679)". Biographical Directory of the United States Congress.

U.S. House of Representatives
| Preceded by Nicholas Longworth | Member of the U.S. House of Representatives from Ohio's 1st congressional district 1913-1915 | Succeeded by Nicholas Longworth |
