= Foreign Ship Registry Act =

- Long title: An Act to provide for the admission of foreign-built ships to American registry for the foreign trade, and for other purposes.
- Acronyms (colloquial): FSRA
- Nicknames: Foreign Ship Registry Act of 1914
- Enacted by: the 63rd United States Congress
- Effective: August 18, 1914

Citations
- Public law: Pub. L. 63–175
- Statutes at Large: 38 Stat. 698

Legislative history
- Introduced in the House as H.R. 18202 by Joshua W. Alexander (D-MO); Reported by the joint conference committee on August 14, 1914; agreed to by the House on August 17, 1914 (Agreed) and by the Senate on August 17, 1914 (40-20); Signed into law by President Woodrow Wilson on August 18, 1914

The Foreign Ship Registry Act was a federal legislation that provided for the admission of foreign-built ships to the American registry.

== Legal Repercussions ==
It provided admission of foreign-built ships to the American registry for foreign trade, making it easier for them to legally hoist the American flag. The bill provided for the survey, measurement, and inspection of such ships, though it did not require American ownership of a majority of stock in corporations applying for American registry, which was a clear violation of international custom and international law. Theoretically, Germany could get American registration, hoist the U.S. flag on its merchant vessels, and avoid the British Blockade. This possibility provoked much British protest; however, the German owners of vessels in American harbors dared not risk losing their property and did not take advantage of the act.

== Suspension of the 1914 Statute ==
On September 7, 1917, President Woodrow Wilson issued Executive Order 2696 suspending the United States statute for a period of two years.

== See also ==
Admiralty law
Flag of convenience
International Mercantile Marine Co.
Ship registration

== Periodical Bibliography ==
- "TO RAISE OUR FLAG ON 14 OCEAN LINERS; International Mercantile Marine Co. to Change Registry When Act Is Amended. 160,000 ADDED TONNAGE Lapland, Arabic, and Cymric Among the Ships That Will Fly American Emblem". New York Times. August 6, 1914. p. 7.
- "SHIP REGISTRY BILL PASSES THE SENATE; Conference Report Defeated by 40 to 20 Vote and the House Measure Adopted Entire". New York Times. August 18, 1914. p. 12.
- "SIGNS SHIP REGISTRY BILL.; Fully 100 Foreign-Built Vessels Ready to Raise American Flag". New York Times. August 23, 1914. p. 15.
- "NEW REGISTRY BILL SIGNED.; Final Step In Opening of American Registry to Foreign Ships". New York Times. September 5, 1914. p. 14.

== Sources ==
- Foreign Ship Registration Act
- Text of the Foreign Ship Registry Act
- "Foreign Ship REgistraty Act". Law Reporter. November 1999. Archived from the original on October 2, 2010 – via FindArticles.
- "Vessel Documents". Maritime Records. U.S. National Archives and Records Administration.
