= Emergency Internal Revenue Tax Act =

- Other short titles: War Revenue Act of 1914
- Long title: An Act To increase the internal revenue, and for other purposes
- Enacted by: the 63rd United States Congress
- Effective: October 22, 1914

Citations
- Public law: Public Law 63-217
- Statutes at Large: 38 Stat. 745

Legislative history
- Introduced in the House of Representatives as H.R. 18891 by Oscar Underwood (D‑AL) on September 21, 1914; Committee consideration by House Committee on Ways and Means; Passed the House of Representatives on September 25, 1914 (234–135); Passed the Senate on October 17, 1914 (34–22); Reported by the joint conference committee on October 19 – October 21, 1914; agreed to by the House of Representatives on October 22, 1914 (Voice vote) and by the Senate on October 22, 1914 (Voice vote); Signed into law by President Woodrow Wilson on October 22, 1914

Major amendments
- Extended by Joint Resolution on December 17, 1915 (39 Stat. 2)

The Emergency Internal Revenue Tax Act of 1914 (H.R. 18891) renewed many of the excise taxes introduced by the Spanish–American War Revenue Act in 1898, including a federal telephone tax. It was introduced by the United States Congress in response to World War I, which had reduced international trade and hence the tax revenue collected from U.S. corporations, while also increasing the amount of federal spending. Originally set to expire on December 31, 1915, the taxes mandated by the 1914 Act were extended for another year through a joint resolution in Congress on December 17, 1915.

== Background ==
In 1878, a federal telephone excise tax was introduced as a "war tax" to help pay for the Spanish–American War, but was repealed in 1902. In 1914, it was reinstated as part of the Emergency Internal Revenue Tax Act, after President Wilson called on Congress to raise an additional $100 million due to World War I.

The act taxed legacies and inherited personal property on a graduated scale according to the size of the estate and the degree of relationship to the deceased (surviving husbands and wives received a general exemption). A maximum rate of 15% applied to bequests from estates valued over $1 million to distant relatives, non-relatives, or "bodies politic or corporate." The act also included an excise on receipts in excess of $200,000 assessed to firms in the petroleum and sugar refining industries. It raised stamp rates, and it placed a .01 cent tax on every telephone call costing more than .15 cents.

On December 17, 1915, Congress voted to extend the tax through December 31, 1916, but the Revenue Act of 1916 in September of that year discontinued the telephone tax.
