= Amos H. Radcliffe =

American politician

Amos Henry Radcliffe
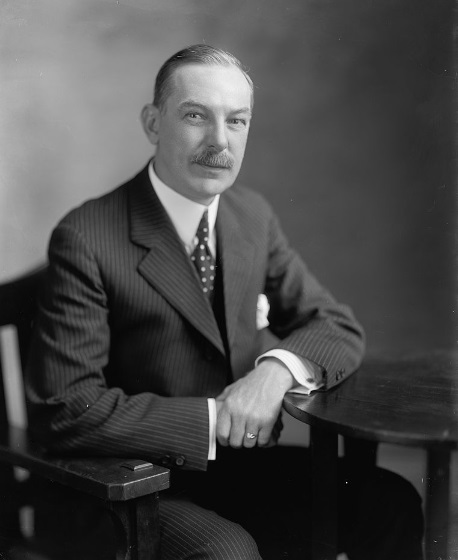

Member of the U.S. House of Representatives from New Jersey's 7th district
- In office March 4, 1919 – March 3, 1923
- Preceded by: Dow H. Drukker
- Succeeded by: George N. Seger

Mayor of Paterson, New Jersey
- In office 1916–1919
- Preceded by: Robert H. Fordyce
- Succeeded by: Clifford L. Newman

Sheriff of Passaic County
- In office 1912–1915

Member of the New Jersey General Assembly from Passaic County
- In office 1907–1912

Personal details
- Born: January 16, 1870 Paterson, New Jersey, U.S.
- Died: December 29, 1950 (aged 80) Balesville, New Jersey, U.S.
- Resting place: Cedar Lawn Cemetery
- Party: Republican
- Education: Paterson Public Schools

Military service
- Allegiance: United States; New Jersey
- Branch/service: Army National Guard
- Years of service: 1888-1893
- Rank: Sergeant
- Unit: New Jersey National Guard

Amos Henry Radcliffe (January 16, 1870 - December 29, 1950) was an American Republican politician who represented New Jersey's 7th congressional district, serving two terms in office from March 4, 1919, to March 3, 1923.

== Early life and education ==
Radcliffe was born in Paterson, New Jersey, on January 16, 1870. He attended the Paterson Public Schools, and graduated from the New York Trade School. Radcliffe served as a sergeant in the New Jersey National Guard from 1888 to 1893.

== Early career ==
He became a blacksmith and ornamental and structural ironworker. In 1896 became associated with his father's firm and in 1907 was made secretary of James Radcliffe & Sons Co., a structural iron manufacturing company.

Radcliffe was a member of the New Jersey General Assembly from 1907 to 1912. He served as a delegate to the Republican State conventions in 1910, 1911, and 1912, was sheriff of Passaic County from 1912 to 1915 and was fish and game commissioner from 1914 to 1919. Radcliffe served as Mayor of Paterson, New Jersey, from 1916 to 1919.

== Congress ==
Radcliffe was elected as a Republican to the Sixty-sixth and Sixty-seventh Congresses, serving in office from March 4, 1919, to March 3, 1923, but was an unsuccessful candidate for reelection in 1922 to the Sixty-eighth Congress.

== Later career and death ==
After leaving Congress, he resumed active interests in Radcliffe & Sons Company and was treasurer at the time of his death. he was the founder and a former president of the Franklin Trust Company, of Paterson, and served as chairman of the board.

In 1925, he became a member of the Board of Standards and Appeals in Paterson. He died in Balesville, New Jersey, on December 29, 1950, and was interred in Cedar Lawn Cemetery in Paterson.

U.S. House of Representatives
| Preceded by Dow H. Drukker | Member of the U.S. House of Representatives from New Jersey's 7th congressional district March 4, 1919 – March 3, 1923 | Succeeded by George N. Seger |
