= George N. Seger =

American politician

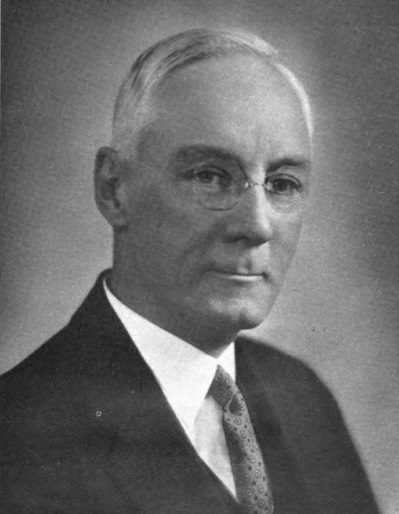

Member of the U.S. House of Representatives from New Jersey
- In office March 4, 1923 – August 26, 1940
- Preceded by: Amos H. Radcliffe
- Succeeded by: Gordon Canfield
- Constituency: 7th district (1923–1933); 8th district (1933–1940)

Personal details
- Born: January 4, 1866 New York, New York, U.S.
- Died: August 26, 1940 (aged 74) Washington, D.C., U.S.
- Party: Republican

George Nicholas Seger (January 4, 1866 – August 26, 1940) was an American politician. A Republican, he represented New Jersey in the United States House of Representatives for eighteen years, from 1923 until his death on August 26, 1940. Seger first represented New Jersey's 7th district from 1923 to 1933 and New Jersey's 8th district from 1933 to 1940, where he succeeded Fred A. Hartley Jr.

== Biography ==
Seger was born on January 4, 1866, in New York City. When he was thirty-three years old, Seger moved and settled in Passaic, New Jersey. As a resident of Passaic, Seger involved himself in building up business in the city. Seger involved himself with such organization as the Freemasons, Knights Templar, Shriners, Elks, and Royal Arcanum. He later got involved in the city's politics, serving as a member of the board of education from 1906 to 1911 and then as mayor of Passaic, New Jersey, from 1911 to 1919. During his mayoral term, he served as a delegate to the Republican National Convention in 1916, member of the Council of National Defense during World War I, and president of the New Jersey State League of Municipalities in 1917 and 1918. After serving as mayor, Seger became the city's director of finance, and held that position until 1923 when he ran for the House seat in New Jersey's 7th District.

== Politics ==
Seger won the election and succeeded Amos H. Radcliffe, beating out Wilmer A. Cadmus, Frank Hubschmitt and Harry Santhouse. In the election, he captured 54.6% of the vote, while the Democrat Cadmus captured 43.5%. Seger faced smooth re-election bids in 1924 and 1926, when he captured over 70% of the vote against his Democratic rivals. In December 1929, Seger's daughter, Alva M. Seger, married Frederick Haskell Dominick, the Democratic Representative from South Carolina. In the 1930 United States House elections, Seger faced Harry Joelson in a close re-election bid. He captured 53.7% of the vote in the race for the seat in New Jersey's 7th district. Seger faced Joelson again in the 1932 elections, but this time, the race was much closer. Seger captured 49.2% of the vote, squeezing by Joelson by a mere 239 votes. Seger served as New Jersey's 7th District representative until 1934, when he moved to the New Jersey's 8th District. In the 1934 House elections, he faced Frank J. Van Noort, a former mayor of Paterson, New Jersey. Seger defeated Noort by capturing 53.6% of the vote. Seger won future re-election bids, and served as the Representative for the 8th district until August 26, 1940, when he suddenly died in Washington, D.C.

== Legacy ==
He was succeeded by his long-time secretary, Gordon Canfield, who served the position until 1961.

A Liberty ship was commissioned under his name for use in World War II. Liberty ship Hull #3049, the SS George N. Seger, built in South Portland, Maine, was laid down on June 17, 1944, and was launched more than a month later on August 8. The ship was later scrapped in 1967.

== See also ==
- List of members of the United States Congress who died in office (1900–1949)

U.S. House of Representatives
Preceded by Amos H. Radcliffe	Member of the U.S. House of Representatives from New Jersey's 7th congressional district 1923–1933	Succeeded by Randolph Perkins
Preceded by Fred A. Hartley Jr.	Member of the U.S. House of Representatives from New Jersey's 8th congressional district 1933–1940	Succeeded by Gordon Canfield
