= John Philip Hill =

American politician

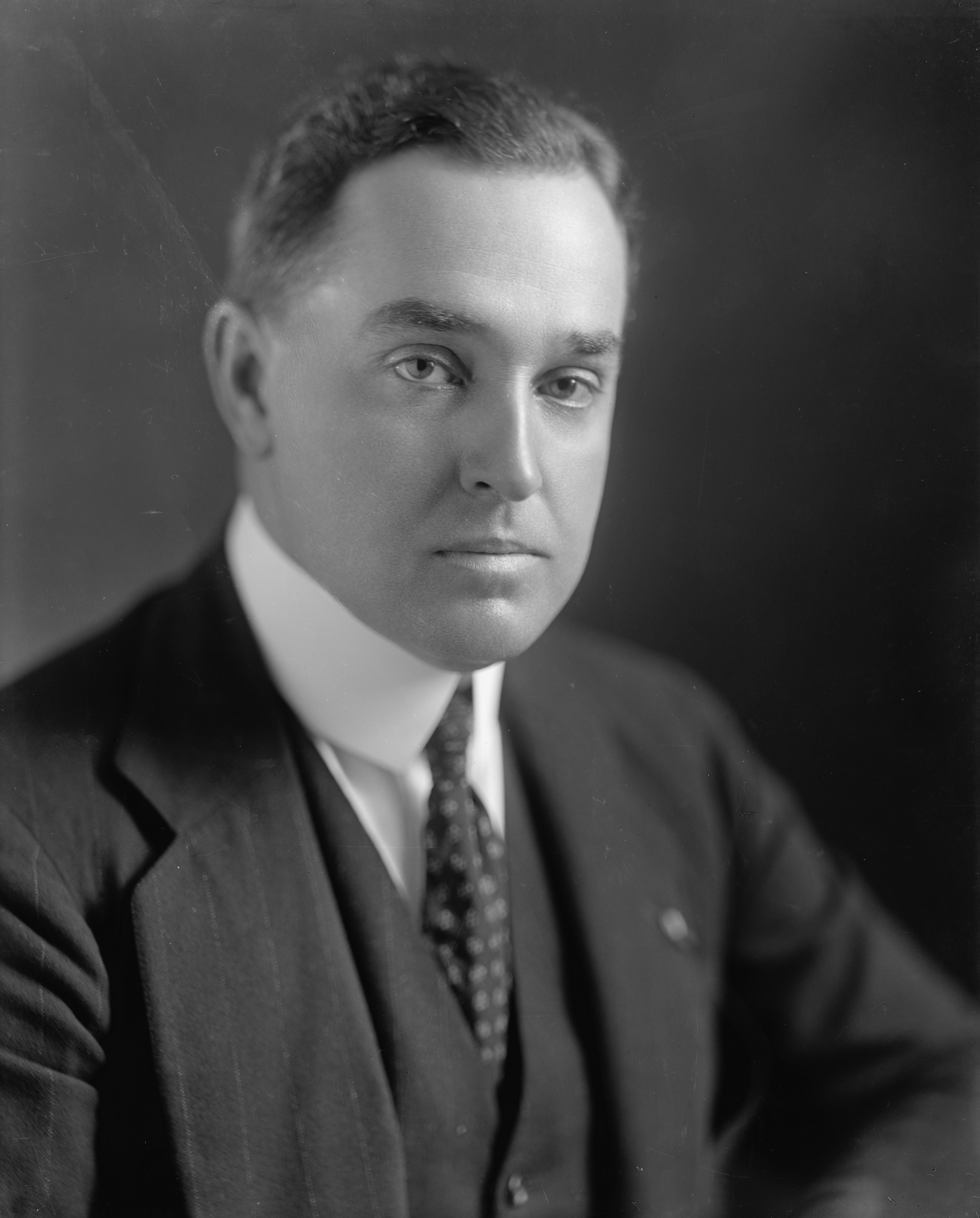
- Hill (c. 1905)

Member of the U.S. House of Representatives from Maryland's 3rd district
- In office March 4, 1921 – March 3, 1927
- Preceded by: Charles P. Coady
- Succeeded by: Vincent L. Palmisano

Personal details
- Born: John Boynton Philip Clayton Hill; May 2, 1879 Annapolis, Maryland, U.S.
- Died: May 23, 1941 (aged 62) Washington, D.C., U.S.
- Resting place: Arlington National Cemetery; Arlington, Virginia, U.S.
- Party: Republican
- Spouse: Suzanne Howell Carroll (m. 1913)
- Education: Johns Hopkins University (AB); Harvard Law School (LLB)
- Occupation: Politician; lawyer

John Boynton Philip Clayton Hill (May 2, 1879 – May 23, 1941) was a U.S. representative from the 3rd Congressional district of Maryland, serving three terms from 1921 to 1927.

== Early life ==
John Boynton Philip Clayton Hill was born on May 2, 1879, in Annapolis, Maryland, to Kate Watts (née Clayton) and Charles Ebenezer Hill. He attended common schools and graduated from Johns Hopkins University in 1900 with a Bachelor of Arts. He graduated from Harvard Law School in 1903 with a Bachelor of Laws. He was admitted to the bar in Boston in 1903 and commenced practice in Boston, Massachusetts, in the office of Ropes, Gray & Gorman.

== Career ==
Hill returned to Baltimore, Maryland and was admitted to the bar in Boston in 1904. He then practiced law there. Hill was a candidate for the 12th ward in the Maryland House of Delegates in 1905. He was a candidate for the 2nd ward in the House of Delegates in 1907. Hill was an unsuccessful candidate for election to the Sixty-first Congress in 1908. He served as United States Attorney for the district of Maryland from 1910 to 1915. In 1915, Hill was an unsuccessful candidate for mayor of Baltimore, and served as delegate to the Republican National Convention in 1916. He served as judge advocate for the Fifteenth Division, and attached to the Fourteenth Cavalry, Mexican border service, from August 26 to December 15, 1916. Hill also practiced law with Hill, Ross & Hill. During the First World War, he was major and lieutenant colonel in the United States Army in 1918 and 1919.

After the war, Hill was elected as a Republican to the Sixty-seventh, Sixty-eighth, and Sixty-ninth Congresses, serving from March 4, 1921, to March 3, 1927. To date, he is the last Republican to represent a significant portion of Baltimore in the House. He was an unsuccessful candidate for the United States Senate in 1926, an unsuccessful candidate for election in 1928 to the Seventy-first Congress, and again in 1936 to the Seventy-fifth Congress. Hill moved to New York City in 1937 and continued the practice of law until he returned to Annapolis in 1940.

Hill was the only representative from Maryland, and one of only 62 House members, to vote against the 1924 Johnson-Reed Act, the law that placed severe quotas on immigration to the United States

During Prohibition, Hill planted some grape vines and apples trees in his yard, and renamed his house "Franklin Farms", since farmers were allowed to make wine and cider. He was arrested and charged with the illegal manufacture of liquor, but the jury pronounced it "not intoxicating in fact", even though its alcohol content was more than 12%.

== Personal life ==
Hill married Suzanne Howell Carroll, the great-great-great granddaughter of Charles Carroll of Carrollton, on October 28, 1913.

Hill died in Washington, D.C., and is interred in Arlington National Cemetery.

U.S. House of Representatives
Preceded by Charles P. Coady	Maryland's 3rd congressional district 1921–1927	Succeeded by Vincent L. Palmisano
