= William Wilder =

American politician (1855–1913)

William Henry Wilder
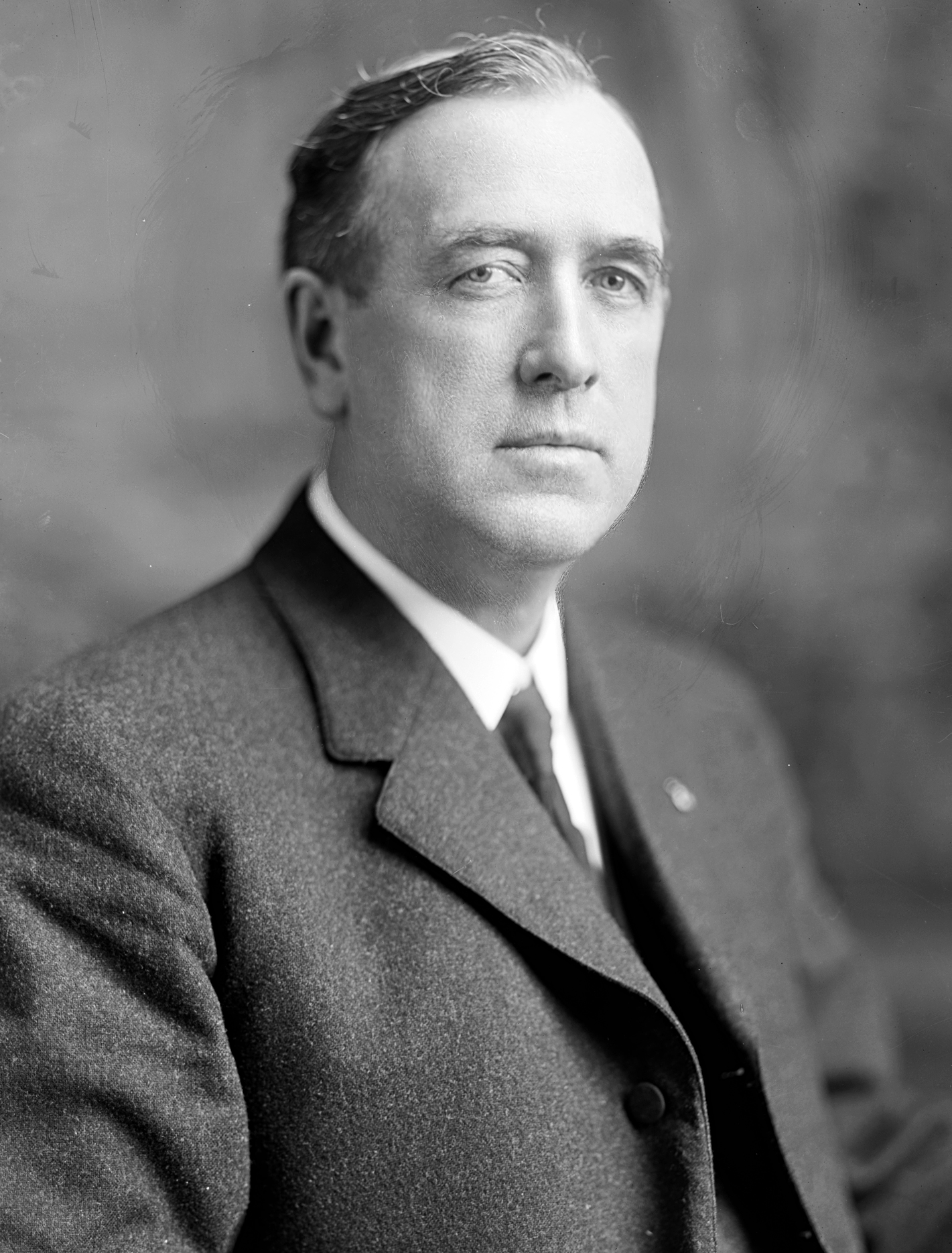
- Wilder (c. 1905–1913)

Member of the U.S. House of Representatives from Massachusetts
- In office March 4, 1911 – September 11, 1913
- Preceded by: John Joseph Mitchell
- Succeeded by: Calvin Paige
- Constituency: 4th district (1911–13); 3rd district (1913)

Personal details
- Born: May 14, 1855 Belfast, Maine, U.S.
- Died: September 11, 1913 (aged 58) Washington, D.C., U.S.
- Resting place: Crystal Lake Cemetery; Gardner, Massachusetts, U.S.
- Party: Republican
- Profession: Lawyer

William Henry Wilder (May 14, 1855 – September 11, 1913) was a lawyer and U.S. representative from Massachusetts.

== Biography ==
Wilder was born in Belfast, Maine. He moved to Gardner, Massachusetts, in 1866. He was president of Wilder Industries. He studied law, was admitted to the bar in 1900, and was admitted to practice before the United States Supreme Court in 1909. He studied the monetary systems of Europe in 1909 and wrote many articles and pamphlets on monetary questions.

Wilder was elected as a Republican to the Sixty-second and Sixty-third Congresses and served from March 4, 1911, until his death in Washington, D.C., on September 11, 1913. He is buried at Crystal Lake Cemetery in Gardner.

== See also ==
- List of members of the United States Congress who died in office (1900–1949)

== Bibliography ==
- Who's who in State Politics, 1912 Practical Politics (1912) p. 29.
- United States Congress. "William Wilder (id: W000462)". Biographical Directory of the United States Congress.
- William H. Wilder, late a representative from Massachusetts, Memorial addresses delivered in the House of Representatives and Senate frontispiece 1915

U.S. House of Representatives
Preceded by John Joseph Mitchell	Member of the U.S. House of Representatives from Massachusetts's 4th congressional district March 4, 1911 – March 3, 1913	Succeeded by Samuel E. Winslow (district moved)
Preceded by John A. Thayer	Member of the U.S. House of Representatives from Massachusetts's 3rd congressional district March 4, 1913 – September 11, 1913	Succeeded by Calvin D. Paige
