= Gordon Canfield =

American politician (1898–1972)

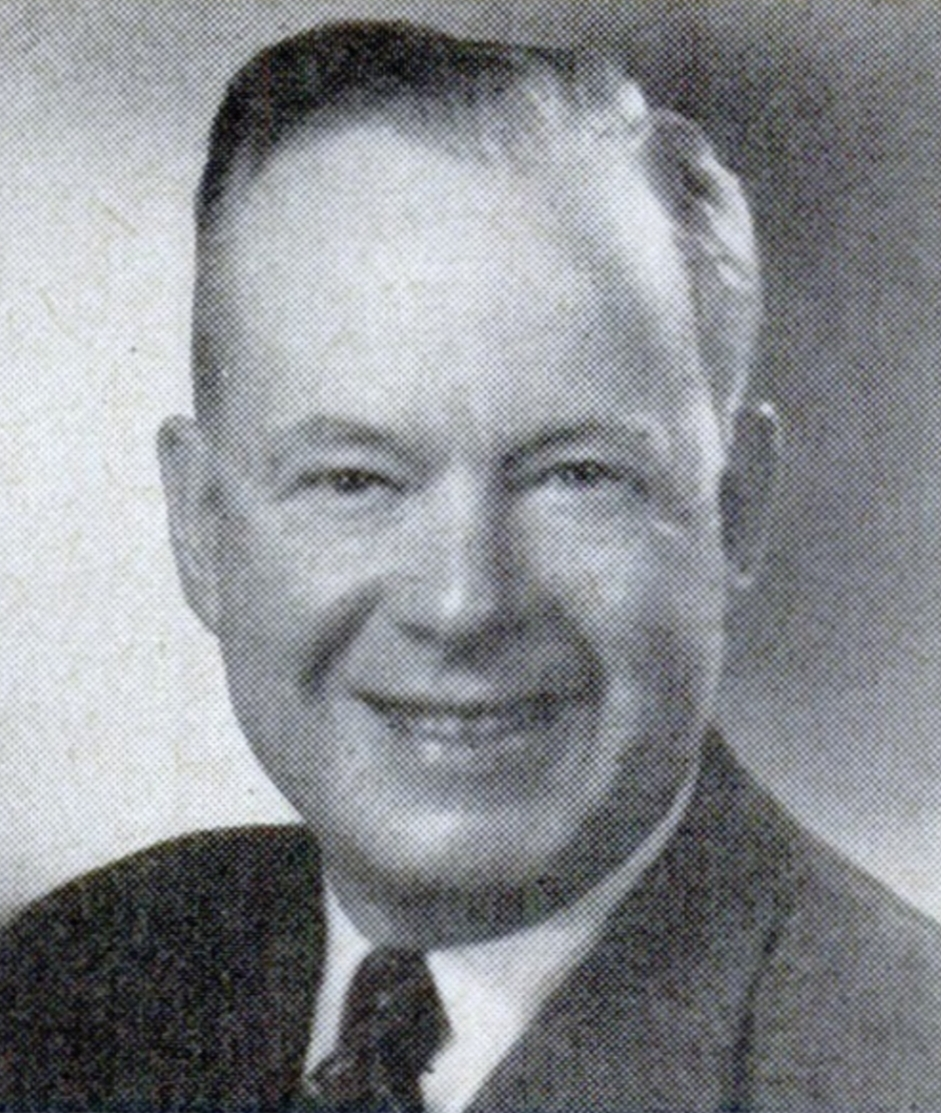

Member of the U.S. House of Representatives from New Jersey's 8th district
- In office January 3, 1941 – January 3, 1961
- Preceded by: George N. Seger
- Succeeded by: Charles S. Joelson

Personal details
- Born: April 15, 1898 Salamanca, New York, US
- Died: June 20, 1972 (aged 74) Hawthorne, New Jersey, US
- Party: Republican

James Gordon Canfield (April 15, 1898, in Salamanca, New York – June 20, 1972, in Hawthorne, New Jersey) was an American lawyer and politician. Canfield, a Republican, was first a secretary under the United States representative for New Jersey's 8th District, George N. Seger, but he later succeeded Seger and represented New Jersey in the United States House of Representatives for twenty years, lasting from 1941 until 1961. Canfield is most remembered as the "Father of the United States Coast Guard Reserve", as he spearheaded the effort to pass the legislation that funded the reserve in 1950.

== Background ==
After graduating through the Binghamton, New York public school system, Canfield was drafted, and served as a private in the Signal Corps during 1917 and 1918, the last two years of World War I. After the war, Canfield went to Passaic, New Jersey, and became a reporter. He became a reporter for the next four years, until 1923. After that, he went to study law at New Jersey Law School in Newark, New Jersey, and later at The George Washington University Law School, where he obtained his Bachelor of Laws degree in 1926. The following year he was admitted into the Washington, D.C., bar association.

== Politics ==
Canfield had been working under New Jersey's Eight District Representative, George N. Seger, since 1923, and he continued to do so until 1940. Seger died on August 26, 1940, and Canfield ran under the Republican ticket for the November 1940 elections. Canfield, a member of the Freemasons and the Rotary Club, was sworn into the 77th United States Congress on January 3, 1941. One of the things Canfield did in Congress was introduce legislation for the funding of the United States Coast Guard Reserve. The legislation passed in April 1950, and the reserve component for the United States Coast Guard received its first $1 million appropriation for training. For his efforts to pass this legislation, Canfield is frequently referred to as "the Father of the Coast Guard Reserve." During the Congressional recess in 1944, Canfield went to help his fellow man in World War II. As a seaman, he did North Atlantic tanker duty for the United States Merchant Marine. On April 22, 1945, Canfield was among the first Congressmen to visit the Holocaust concentration camps at Buchenwald. In 1948, Canfield had a close race with his future Democratic successor, Charles S. Joelson. Canfield captured 59,191 votes, just 148 more than Joelson, and was proclaimed the winner of the election. Canfield was challenged again by Joelson in 1954, but he defeated Joelson by a 54.8%-45.1% margin.

Canfield was re-elected to represent New Jersey's Eight District for a total of nine terms, until finally when he was not a candidate for renomination in 1960 to the 87th United States Congress. Canfield voted in favor of the Civil Rights Acts of 1957 and 1960.

== Later years ==
After serving in Congress, Canfield retired to his home in Paterson, New Jersey. He served as the director of the National Housing Conference, a public policy and affordable housing advocacy organization, and also as the Public Relations Director for the First Federal Savings and Loan Association of Paterson.

Canfield remained active in civic affairs in his community until his death on June 20, 1972, in Hawthorne, New Jersey, at the age of 74.

U.S. House of Representatives
Preceded by George N. Seger	Member of the U.S. House of Representatives from New Jersey's 8th congressional district 1941 - 1961	Succeeded by Charles S. Joelson
