= Sponge Act =

The Sponge Act is a Federal statute that makes it illegal to take, catch, or sell, commercial sponges that are less than 5 inches in diameter when wet. The law only applies to two areas: the Gulf of Mexico and the Straits of Florida. The penalty for a violation of this law is a fine not to exceed $500 and a lien on the vessel on which the offense was committed.
