= George Konig =

American politician

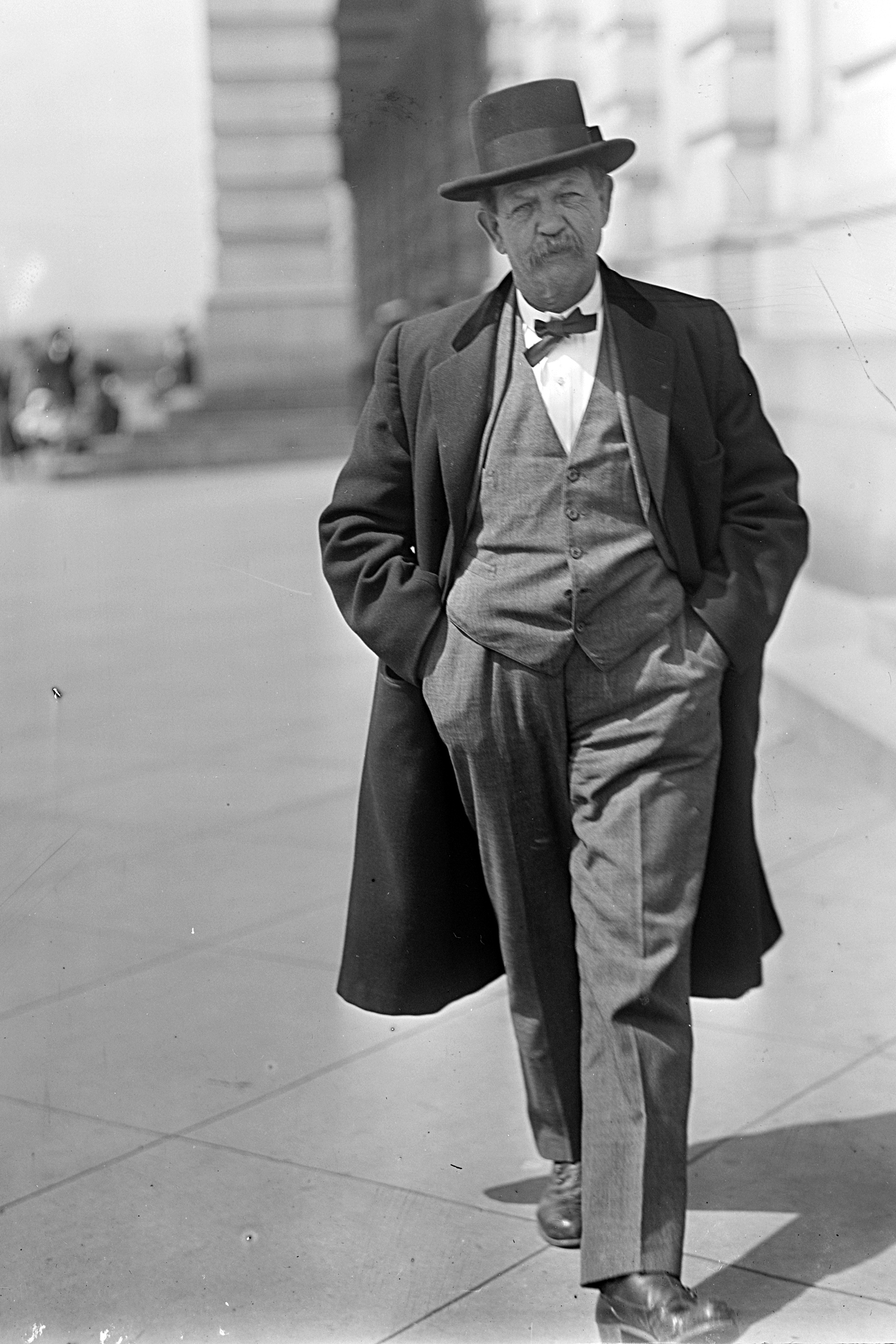
George Konig

George Leo Konig (January 26, 1856 – May 31, 1913) was a United States Congressman who represented Maryland's 3rd congressional district from 1911 until his death in 1913. He was a member of the Democratic Party.

Konig was born to George Konig (the 2nd) and Caroline Forrester Konig. He grew up in the Fell's Point neighborhood of Baltimore, Maryland, and obtained minimal schooling. He worked as a shipyard caulker for several years, and eventually become the president of the ship caulker union and an official in District Assembly 41 of the Knights of Labor.

Konig moved to Norfolk, Virginia, for a time, but returned during an epidemic. He worked for the Baltimore Chrome Works and later became a police officer. He left the police force in 1881 and served as treasurer for the Ship Caulkers' Union for over 12 years. He then went into the sewage business.

In 1884, Konig married Margaret Schroeder, and, over the next few years, they had four daughters: Mary (Carrie), Emma, Margaret, and Sarah (Sadie). They also had a son named George (the fourth) and two adopted daughters. Konig's father died of natural causes in 1892.

In 1895, Konig campaigned for the 1st branch of the Baltimore City Council and lost. That same year, he and his family moved to the Canton neighborhood of Baltimore. In May 1903, Konig won the first ward seat of the first branch of the city council, and was re-elected in 1905. Konig ran for a seat in the second branch in 1907, and won. Much of this area was contained within Maryland's 3rd congressional district, which he would win election to in 1910 by unseating a Republican incumbent. He held the seat from March 4, 1911, until his death due to complications from pneumonia. He is interred in Baltimore Cemetery.

== See also ==
- List of members of the United States Congress who died in office (1900–1949)

U.S. House of Representatives
Preceded by John Kronmiller	Member of the U.S. House of Representatives from Maryland's 3rd congressional district 1911–1913	Succeeded by Charles Pearce Coady
