= Uniform Bill of Lading Act =

The Uniform Bills of Lading Act was adopted in 1909 and passed by the U.S. Uniform Law Commission. The act addressed the judicial and legislative treatment of issues such as the extent of the carrier's liability to the consignee of the goods or to the buyer of the bill of lading based upon the carrier's issuance of the bill. It governed the relationship between persons with interest in the goods, and carriers who transported those goods. It set / described how a carrier could limit its liability.

== Background ==
A committee to create uniformity in bills of lading was created in 1889. It resulted in legislation in the passage in 1890 and 1893 that established more uniformity.

A bill of lading is a legal document used in the transportation industry between a shipper of a particular good and a carrier detailing the type, quantity and destination of the good being transported. This document must accompany the shipped goods and be signed by an authorized representative from the carrier and the shipper. The bill of lading can serve as a Proof of Delivery when the goods are delivered to the destination and signed for by the consignee. These statements reflect either the shipper's representations to the carrier or the carrier's notations from its own inspection of the goods. If the bill of lading specifically notes the defective condition of the goods or their packaging, it is "claused" or "fouled." If no defects are noted, it is called a "clean" bill of lading.

== Bill of Lading description ==
The Bill of Lading designates that a carrier shall assume all risk of loss, damage, delay and liability in the transportation of any goods for shippers from the time of carrier's receipt of such goods and from a shipper until proper delivery has been made. Carriers are responsible for full actual loss. If the consignee of goods finds the freight damaged or unacceptable the bill of lading also serves as a legal instrument to dispute the delivery of goods in accordance to the provisions of Title 49 of the Code of Federal Regulations Section 1005, Section 14706 (the Carmack Amendment), and applicable state law to rectify any losses that happened due to the carrier.
