= Reiss, Scotland =

Village in Highland, Scotland

Coordinates: 58.48041°N 3.13248°W

Reiss: Scottish Gaelic: Reis
- Location within the Caithness area
- OS grid reference: ND340552
- Council area: Highland
- Lieutenancy area: Caithness
- Country: Scotland
- Sovereign state: United Kingdom
- Post town: Wick
- Postcode district: KW1 4
- Police: Scotland
- Fire: Scottish
- Ambulance: Scottish
- UK Parliament: Caithness, Sutherland and Easter Ross
- Scottish Parliament: Caithness, Sutherland and Ross

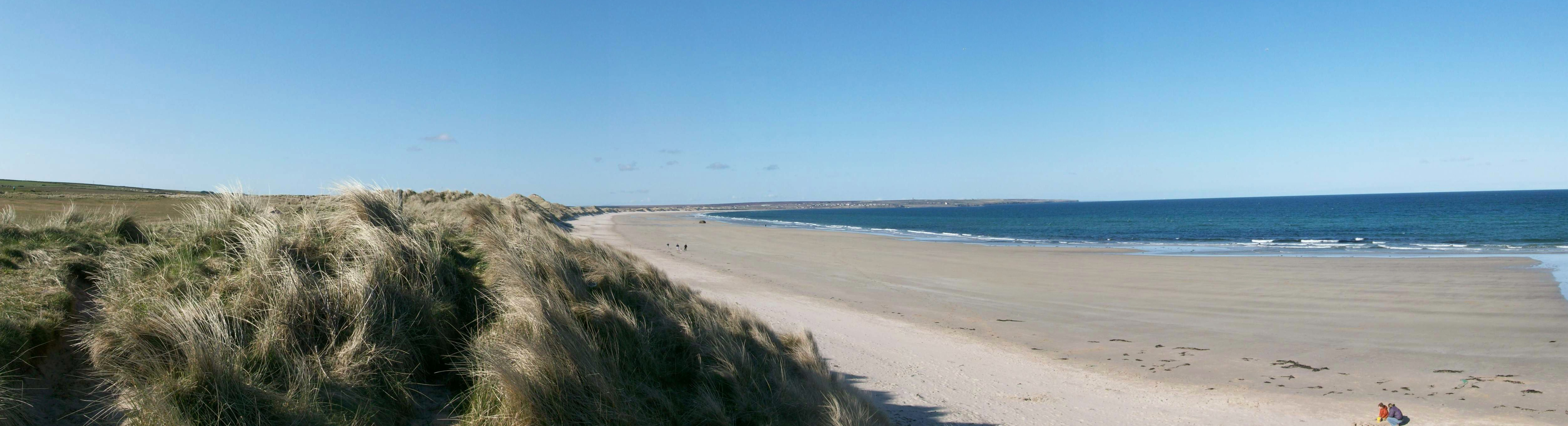
Reiss Sands

Reiss is a village in the former county of Caithness, now in the Highland council area of northern Scotland. It is well known in the Caithness area for its beach and also the 18-hole Wick golf course.

It is 3 miles (4.8 km) north of Wick and 15 miles (24 km) south of John o' Groats. Reiss is mainly made up of two areas, the Reiss Village and Nordwall Park housing areas. Added to this there are various houses dotted through the area, as well as a trailer park.
