= Calvin Paige =

American politician

Calvin DeWitt Paige
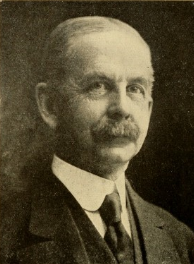

Member of the U.S. House of Representatives from Massachusetts's 3rd district
- In office November 4, 1913 – March 3, 1925
- Preceded by: William Wilder
- Succeeded by: Frank H. Foss

Member of the Massachusetts House of Representatives
- In office 1878-1879

Personal details
- Born: May 20, 1848 Southbridge, Massachusetts
- Died: April 24, 1930 (aged 81) Southbridge, Massachusetts
- Party: Republican

Calvin DeWitt Paige (May 20, 1848 – April 24, 1930) was a U.S. representative from Massachusetts.

He was born in Southbridge, Massachusetts. He was president of the Central Cotton Mills Company, the Southbridge Savings Bank and the Edwards Company.

== Political career ==
He served as a member of the state house of representatives in 1878 and 1879, he was delegate to the Republican National Convention in 1884, and a member of the Governor's council in 1906 and 1907.

He was elected as a Republican to the Sixty-third Congress by special election, after the death of representative William H. Wilder, and reelected to the five succeeding Congresses from 1913 to 1925.

After leaving congress, he withdrew from public life, and engaged in banking in Southbridge.

== See also ==
- 1878 Massachusetts legislature

U.S. House of Representatives
Preceded by William H. Wilder	Member of the U.S. House of Representatives from Massachusetts's 3rd congressional district November 4, 1913-March 3, 1925	Succeeded by Frank H. Foss
