= 1918 United States House of Representatives elections =

House elections for the 66th U.S. Congress

- November 5, 1918 (Note: Maine held its elections September 9, 1918.)

All 435 seats in the United States House of Representatives 218 seats needed for a majority
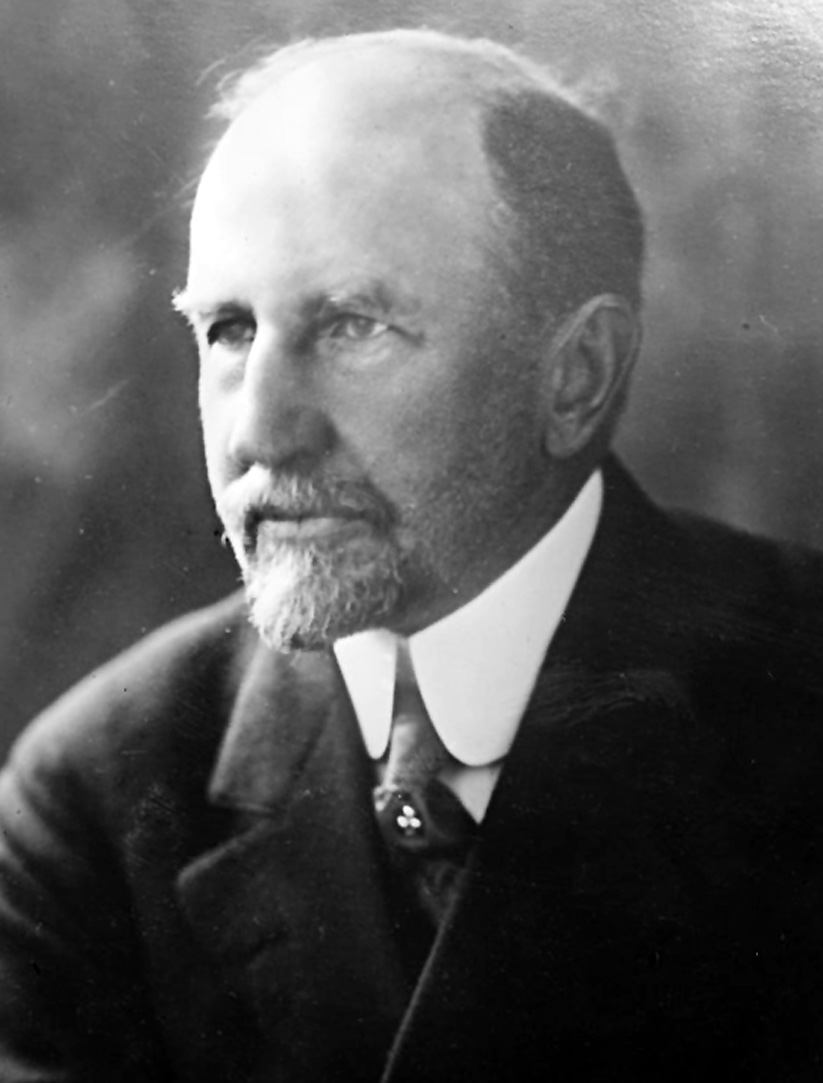

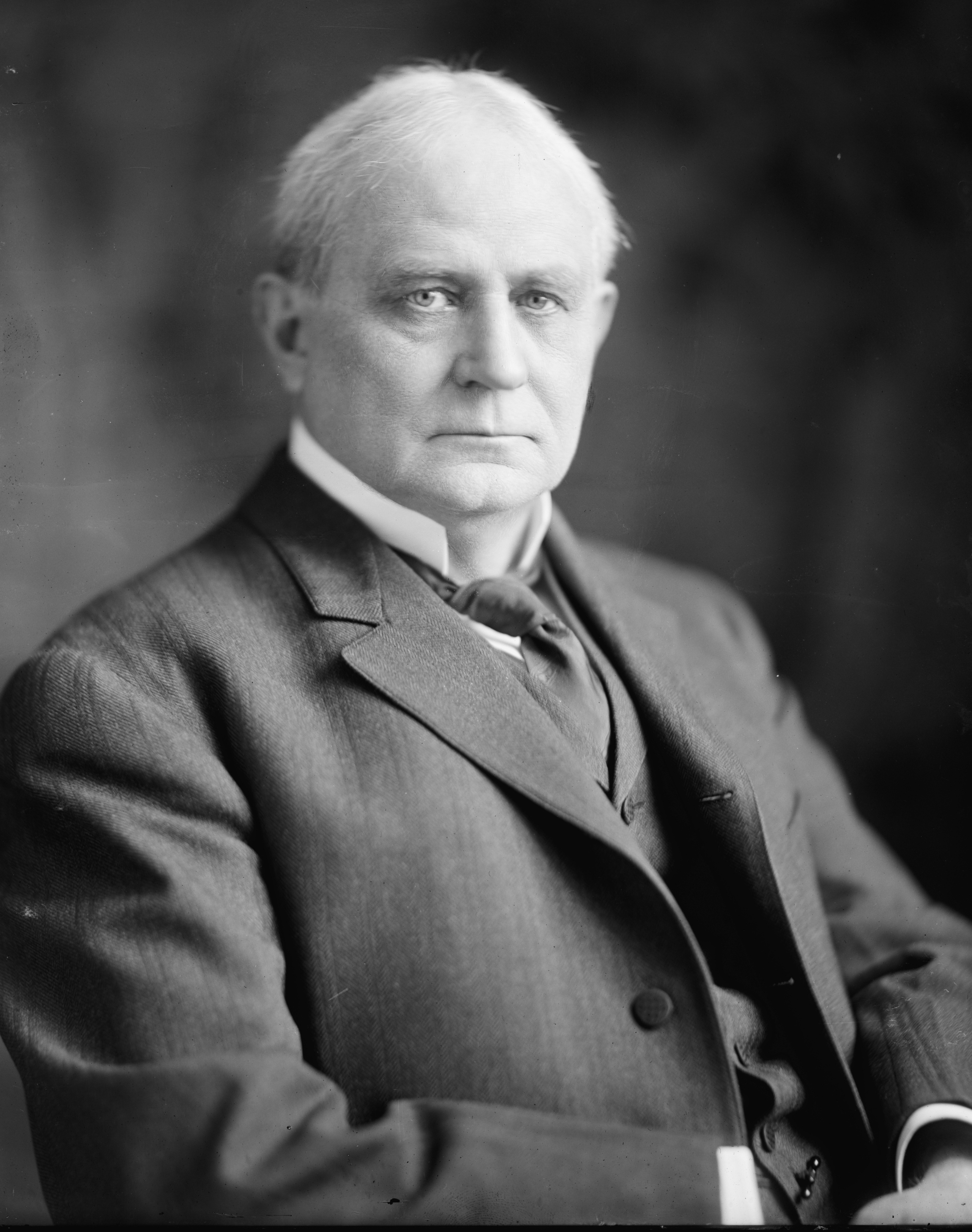
	Majority party	Minority party
Leader	Frederick Gillett	Champ Clark
Party	Republican	Democratic
Leader since	May 19, 1919	March 4, 1909
Leader's seat	Massachusetts 2nd	Missouri 9th
Last election	216 seats	214 seats
Seats won	240	192
Seat change	▲24	▼22
Popular vote	6,661,655	5,458,549
Percentage	52.42%	42.95%
Swing	▲4.07pp	▼2.96pp
	Third party	Fourth party
Party	Socialist	Prohibition
Last election	1 seat	1 seat
Seats won	1 (Note: While Victor Berger won election to Congress from the 5th district of Wisconsin, the seat was later declared vacant on the basis of convictions under the Espionage Act.)	1
Seat change	Steady	Steady
Popular vote	406,852	120,789
Percentage	3.20%	0.95%
Swing	▼0.43pp	▼0.55pp
	Fifth party
Party	Independent
Last election	0 seats
Seats won	1 (Note: William Carss, who was elected to the 8th district in Minnesota, was a member of the Minnesota Non-Partisan League but had run as an independent in the congressional election. He would later become a member of the Farmer-Labor Party when it was formalized in 1920.)
Seat change	▲1
Popular vote	60,646
Percentage	0.48%
Swing	▲0.08pp
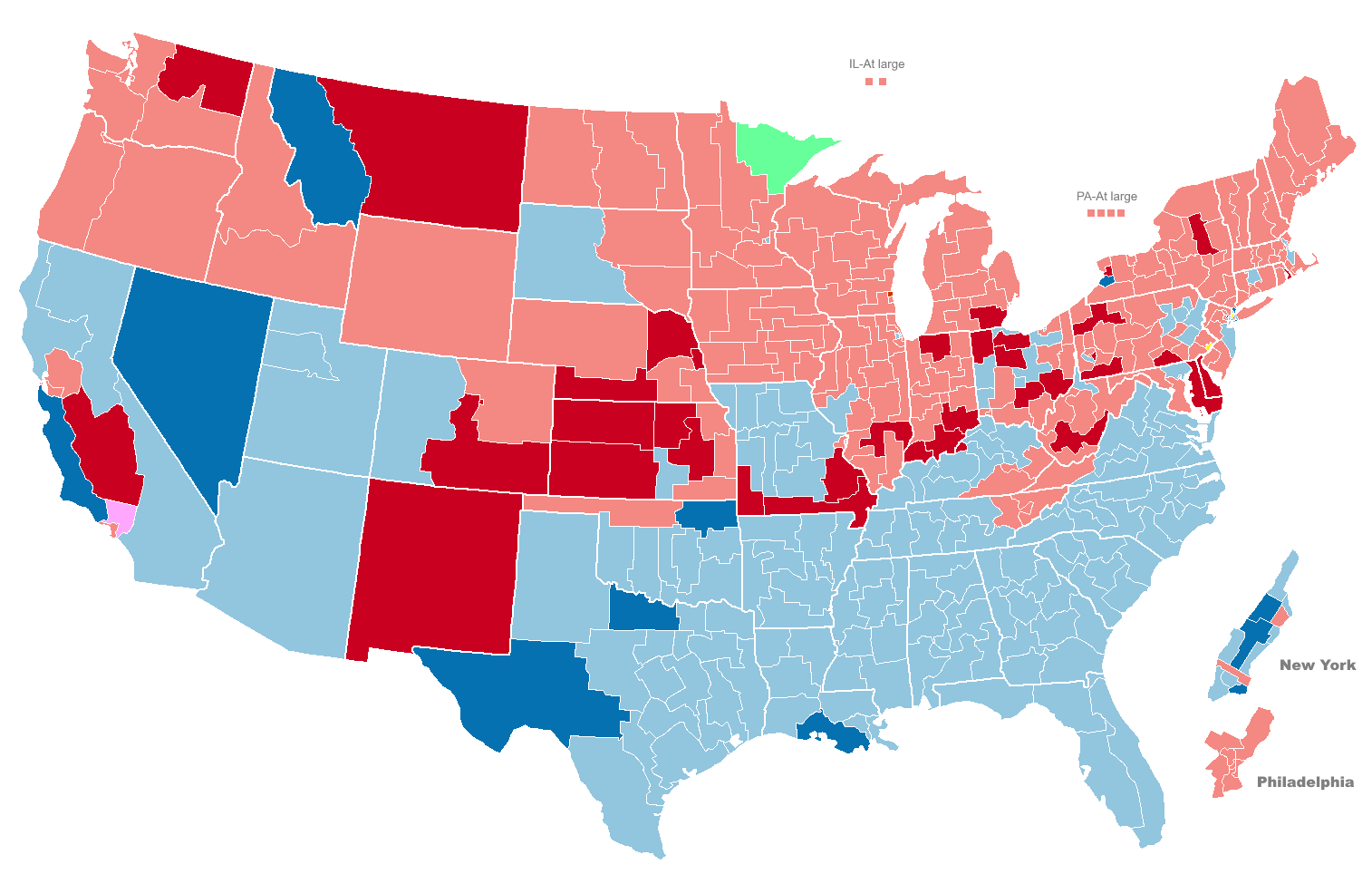
- Results: Democratic hold Democratic gain Republican hold Republican gain Socialist gain Prohibition hold Farmer-Labor gain
Speaker before election
Champ Clark
Democratic
Elected Speaker
Frederick Gillett
Republican

The 1918 United States House of Representatives elections were elections for the United States House of Representatives to elect members to serve in the 66th United States Congress. They were held for the most part on November 5, 1918, while Maine held theirs on September 9. They occurred in the middle of President Woodrow Wilson's second term.

With the country in World War I (contrary to previous promises by Wilson), and Wilson's personal popularity ebbing, the Republicans gained 25 seats and took over control of the House from Wilson's Democrats. Internal divide among Democratic leadership over aspects related to payment of the war also decreased the unity of the party, which had been the organization's strength during the decade. The Progressive Party also disappeared, with its former members generally becoming Democrats. Minnesota's Farmer–Labor Party, a descendant of populism, also gained its very first seat.

Frederick H. Gillett (R-Massachusetts) became Speaker, and previous speaker Champ Clark (D-Missouri) became Minority Leader.

== Background ==
Woodrow Wilson was elected to the presidency in the 1912 presidential election and his victory in the 1916 election made him the first Democratic president to win reelection since Andrew Jackson had in the 1832 election.

Wilson's wheat policies aided in the Democratic defeat. The Food and Fuel Control Act allowed for the cost of wheat to be set at a price control limit of $2.20 per bushel while other products like cotton were not. Wilson later vetoed an attempt by the Republicans to increase the limit to $2.40 per bushel. Republicans were more likely to gain seats in areas with higher amounts of wheat acreage with the Republicans gaining twenty-two seats in the ten highest wheat producing states while the Democrats only gained two seats.

Wilson was also unable to aid the Democratic candidates before the election due to his preparations for involvement in the Paris Peace Conference.

== Overall results ==
Party	Total seats	Change	Seat percentage
Republican Party	240	▲25	55.2%
Democratic Party	192	▼22	44.2%
Farmer–Labor Party	1	▲1	0.2%
Prohibition Party	1	Steady	0.2%
Totals	435^{1}	Steady	Unopposed

^{1} One vacancy, Victor L. Berger, a member of the Socialist Party of America, whom the House refused to seat.

== Election summaries ==
↓
192	3	240
Democratic	(Note: The Farmer–Labor, Prohibition, and Socialist parties each had one member)	Republican

State	Type	Total seats	Republican		Democratic		Progressive		Others	
State	Type	Total seats	Seats	Change	Seats	Change	Seats	Change	Seats	Change
Alabama	Districts	10	0	Steady	10	Steady	0	Steady	0	Steady
Arizona	At-large	1	0	Steady	1	Steady	0	Steady	0	Steady
Arkansas	Districts	7	0	Steady	7	Steady	0	Steady	0	Steady
California	Districts	11	6	▲1	4	Steady	0	▼1	1 (Note: Prohibition)	Steady
Colorado	Districts	4	3	▲2	1	▼2	0	Steady	0	Steady
Connecticut	Districts	5	4	Steady	1	Steady	0	Steady	0	Steady
Delaware	At-large	1	1	▲1	0	▼1	0	Steady	0	Steady
Florida	Districts	4	0	Steady	4	Steady	0	Steady	0	Steady
Georgia	Districts	12	0	Steady	12	Steady	0	Steady	0	Steady
Idaho	District (Note: Changed from at-large.)	2	2	Steady	0	Steady	0	Steady	0	Steady
Illinois	District +2 at-large	27	22	▲1	5	▼1	0	Steady	0	Steady
Indiana	Districts	13	13	▲4	0	▼4	0	Steady	0	Steady
Iowa	Districts	11	11	Steady	0	Steady	0	Steady	0	Steady
Kansas	Districts	8	7	▲4	1	▼4	0	Steady	0	Steady
Kentucky	Districts	11	3 (Note: Representative-Elect Harvey Helm (D, Kentucky 8th) died before the start of the Congress and was replaced in a special election by King Swope (Republican), changing the totals to R 240, D 192.))	▲1	8	▼1	0	Steady	0	Steady
Louisiana	Districts	8	0	Steady	8	▲1	0	▼1	0	Steady
Maine (Note: Elections held early.)	Districts	4	4	Steady	0	Steady	0	Steady	0	Steady
Maryland	Districts	6	3	▲1	3	▼1	0	Steady	0	Steady
Massachusetts	Districts	16	12	Steady	4	Steady	0	Steady	0	Steady
Michigan	Districts	13	12	Steady	1	Steady	0	Steady	0	Steady
Minnesota	Districts	10	8	▼1	1	Steady	0	Steady	1	▲1 (Note: Farmer–Labor)
Mississippi	Districts	8	0	Steady	8	Steady	0	Steady	0	Steady
Missouri	Districts	16	5	▲3	11	▼3	0	Steady	0	Steady
Montana	District	2	1	Steady	1	Steady	0	Steady	0	Steady
Nebraska	Districts	6	6	▲3	0	▼3	0	Steady	0	Steady
Nevada	At-large	1	0	▼1	1	▲1	0	Steady	0	Steady
New Hampshire	Districts	2	2	Steady	0	Steady	0	Steady	0	Steady
New Jersey	Districts	12	7	▼2	5	▲2	0	Steady	0	Steady
New Mexico	At-large	1	1	▲1	0	▼1	0	Steady	0	Steady
New York	Districts	43	24	▼2	19	▲3	0	Steady	0	▼1
North Carolina	Districts	10	0	Steady	10	Steady	0	Steady	0	Steady
North Dakota	Districts	3	3	Steady	0	Steady	0	Steady	0	Steady
Ohio	Districts	22	14	▲5	8	▼5	0	Steady	0	Steady
Oklahoma	Districts	8	1	▼1	7	▲1	0	Steady	0	Steady
Oregon	Districts	3	3	Steady	0	Steady	0	Steady	0	Steady
Pennsylvania	District +4 at-large	36	30	▲1	6	Steady	0	▼1	0	Steady
Rhode Island	Districts	3	3	▲1	0	▼1	0	Steady	0	Steady
South Carolina	Districts	7	0	Steady	7	Steady	0	Steady	0	Steady
South Dakota	Districts	3	2	Steady	1	Steady	0	Steady	0	Steady
Tennessee	Districts	10	2	Steady	8	Steady	0	Steady	0	Steady
Texas	District (Note: At-large seat or seats eliminated in redistricting.)	18	0	Steady	18	Steady	0	Steady	0	Steady
Utah	Districts	2	0	Steady	2	Steady	0	Steady	0	Steady
Vermont	Districts	2	2	Steady	0	Steady	0	Steady	0	Steady
Virginia	Districts	10	1	Steady	9	Steady	0	Steady	0	Steady
Washington	Districts	5	5	▲1	0	▼1	0	Steady	0	Steady
West Virginia	District	6	5	▲1	1	▼1	0	Steady	0	Steady
Wisconsin	Districts	11	10	▼1	0	Steady	0	Steady	1 (Note: Socialist)	▲1
Wyoming	At-large	1	1	Steady	0	Steady	0	Steady	0	Steady
Total		435	239 54.9%	▲23	193 44.4%	▼21	0 0.0%	▼3	3 0.7%	▲1

House seats
Democratic	44.14%
Farmer–Labor	0.23%
Prohibition	0.23%
Republican	55.17%
Socialist	0.23%

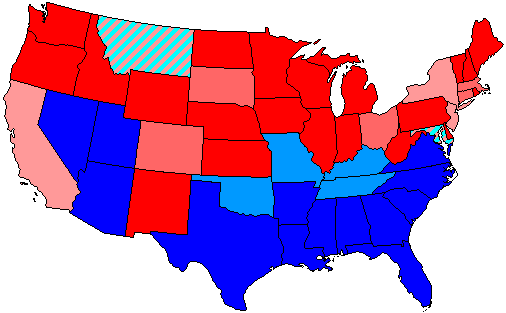
House seats by party holding plurality in state: 80+% Democratic / 80+% Republican; 60+% to 80% Democratic / 60+% to 80% Republican; Up to 60% Democratic / Up to 60% Republican

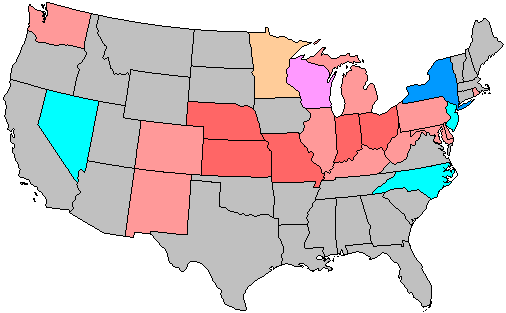
Net gain in party representation: 6+ Democratic gain / / 6+ Republican gain; 3–5 Democratic gain / / 3–5 Republican gain; 1–2 Democratic gain / 1–2 Farmer–Labor / 1–2 Republican gain; 1-2 Socialist no net change

== Special elections ==
Sorted by election date, then by state/district.

District	Incumbent			This race	
District	Member	Party	First elected	Results	Candidates
New York 7	John J. Fitzgerald	Democratic	1898	Incumbent resigned December 31, 1917. Successor was elected March 5, 1918. Democratic hold.	▌ ✓ John J. Delaney (Democratic); [data missing]
New York 8	Daniel J. Griffin	Democratic	1912	Incumbent resigned December 31, 1917, after being elected Sheriff of Kings County, New York. Successor was elected March 5, 1918. Democratic hold.	▌ ✓ William E. Cleary (Democratic); [data missing]
New York 21	George M. Hulbert	Democratic	1914	Incumbent resigned January 1, 1918, to become Commissioner of Docks and director of the Port of New York. Successor was elected March 5, 1918. Democratic hold.	▌ ✓ Jerome F. Donovan (Democratic); [data missing]
New York 22	Henry Bruckner	Democratic	1912	Incumbent resigned December 31, 1917. Successor was elected March 5, 1918. Democratic hold.	▌ ✓ Anthony J. Griffin (Democratic); [data missing]
Illinois 4	Charles Martin	Democratic	1916	Incumbent resigned October 28, 1917. Successor was elected April 2, 1918. Democratic hold.	▌ ✓ John W. Rainey (Democratic); [data missing]
Virginia 1	William A. Jones	Democratic	1890	Incumbent died April 17, 1918. Successor was elected July 2, 1918. Democratic hold.	▌ ✓ S. Otis Bland (Democratic); [data missing]
Maryland 2	Fred Talbott	Democratic	1878; 1884 (retired); 1892; 1894 (lost); 1902	Incumbent died October 5, 1918. Successor was elected November 5, 1918. Democratic hold.	▌ ✓ Carville Benson (Democratic); [data missing]
Missouri 10	Jacob E. Meeker	Republican	1914	Incumbent died October 16, 1918. New member elected November 5, 1918. Republican hold. Winner was not elected to the next term; see below. Republican hold.	▌ ✓ Frederick Essen (Republican) 59.61%; ▌Harlow E. Read (Democratic) 36.83%; ▌William M. Brandt (Socialist) 3.56%
New Jersey 5	John H. Capstick	Republican	1914	Incumbent died March 17, 1918. Successor was elected November 5, 1918. Republican hold.	▌ ✓ William F. Birch (Republican); [data missing]
Ohio 14	Ellsworth Raymond Bathrick	Democratic	1916	Incumbent died December 23, 1917. New member elected November 5, 1918. Democratic hold. Winner was elected to the next term; see below. Democratic hold.	▌ ✓ Martin L. Davey (Democratic); [data missing]
Wisconsin 6	James H. Davidson	Republican	1896; 1912 (lost); 1916	Incumbent died August 6, 1918. Successor was elected November 5, 1918. Republican hold.	▌ ✓ Florian Lampert (Republican) 41.22%; ▌Bondeul A. Husting (Democratic) 35.41%; ▌G. H. Thompson (Socialist) 23.37%
Wisconsin 11	Irvine Lenroot	Republican	1908	Incumbent resigned April 17, 1918, after being elected to the U.S. Senate. Successor was elected November 5, 1918. Republican hold.	▌ ✓ Adolphus P. Nelson (Republican) 97.35%; ▌John P. Jensen (Socialist) 1.04%

== Alabama ==
District	Incumbent			This race	
District	Member	Party	First elected	Results	Candidates
Alabama 1	Oscar Lee Gray	Democratic	1914	Incumbent retired. Democratic hold.	▌ ✓ John McDuffie (Democratic); Unopposed
Alabama 2	S. Hubert Dent Jr.	Democratic	1908	Incumbent re-elected.	▌ ✓ S. Hubert Dent Jr. (Democratic); Unopposed
Alabama 3	Henry B. Steagall	Democratic	1914	Incumbent re-elected.	▌ ✓ Henry B. Steagall (Democratic); Unopposed
Alabama 4	Fred L. Blackmon	Democratic	1910	Incumbent re-elected.	▌ ✓ Fred L. Blackmon (Democratic) 66.15%; ▌J. A. Bingham (Republican) 33.85%
Alabama 5	J. Thomas Heflin	Democratic	1904	Incumbent re-elected.	▌ ✓ J. Thomas Heflin (Democratic); Unopposed
Alabama 6	William B. Oliver	Democratic	1914	Incumbent re-elected.	▌ ✓ William B. Oliver (Democratic); Unopposed
Alabama 7	John L. Burnett	Democratic	1898	Incumbent re-elected.	▌ ✓ John L. Burnett (Democratic) 56.23%; ▌Oliver D. Street (Republican) 43.78%
Alabama 8	Edward B. Almon	Democratic	1914	Incumbent re-elected.	▌ ✓ Edward B. Almon (Democratic); Unopposed
Alabama 9	George Huddleston	Democratic	1914	Incumbent re-elected.	▌ ✓ George Huddleston (Democratic) 85.78%; ▌Joseph O. Thompson (Republican) 14.22
Alabama 10	William B. Bankhead	Democratic	1916	Incumbent re-elected.	▌ ✓ William B. Bankhead (Democratic); Unopposed

== Arizona ==
Results by county Hayden: 50–60% 60–70% 70–80%

District	Incumbent			This race	
District	Member	Party	First elected	Results	Candidates
Arizona at-large	Carl Hayden	Democratic	1912 (new state)	Incumbent re-elected.	▌ ✓ Carl Hayden (Democratic) 60.40%; ▌Thomas Maddock (Republican) 37.90%; ▌Peter T. Robertson (Socialist) 1.70%

== Arkansas ==
District	Incumbent			This race	
District	Member	Party	First elected	Results	Candidates
Arkansas 1	Thaddeus H. Caraway	Democratic	1912	Incumbent re-elected.	▌ ✓ Thaddeus H. Caraway (Democratic); Unopposed
Arkansas 2	William A. Oldfield	Democratic	1908	Incumbent re-elected.	▌ ✓ William A. Oldfield (Democratic); Unopposed
Arkansas 3	John N. Tillman	Democratic	1914	Incumbent re-elected.	▌ ✓ John N. Tillman (Democratic); Unopposed
Arkansas 4	Otis Wingo	Democratic	1912	Incumbent re-elected.	▌ ✓ Otis Wingo (Democratic); Unopposed
Arkansas 5	Henderson M. Jacoway	Democratic	1910	Incumbent re-elected.	▌ ✓ Henderson M. Jacoway (Democratic); Unopposed
Arkansas 6	Samuel M. Taylor	Democratic	1913 (special)	Incumbent re-elected.	▌ ✓ Samuel M. Taylor (Democratic); Unopposed
Arkansas 7	William S. Goodwin	Democratic	1910	Incumbent re-elected.	▌ ✓ William S. Goodwin (Democratic); Unopposed

== California ==
District	Incumbent			This race	
District	Member	Party	First elected	Results	Candidates
California 1	Clarence F. Lea	Democratic	1916	Incumbent re-elected.	▌ ✓ Clarence F. Lea (Democratic); Unopposed
California 2	John E. Raker	Democratic	1910	Incumbent re-elected.	▌ ✓ John E. Raker (Democratic); Unopposed
California 3	Charles F. Curry	Republican	1912	Incumbent re-elected.	▌ ✓ Charles F. Curry (Republican) 91.6%; ▌Allen K. Gifford (Socialist) 8.4%
California 4	Julius Kahn	Republican	1898	Incumbent re-elected.	▌ ✓ Julius Kahn (Republican) 86.6%; ▌William Short (Socialist) 13.4%
California 5	John I. Nolan	Republican	1912	Incumbent re-elected.	▌ ✓ John I. Nolan (Republican) 87%; ▌Thomas F. Feeley (Socialist) 13%
California 6	John A. Elston	Progressive	1912	Incumbent re-elected as a Republican. Republican gain.	▌ ✓ John A. Elston (Republican) (Note: Changed parties.) 88.4%; ▌Luella Twining (Socialist) 11.6%
California 7	Denver S. Church	Democratic	1912	Incumbent retired. Republican gain.	▌ ✓ Henry E. Barbour (Republican) 52.1%; ▌Henry Hawson (Democratic) 47.9%
California 8	Everis A. Hayes	Republican	1904	Incumbent lost re-election. Democratic gain.	▌ ✓ Hugh S. Hersman (Democratic) 53%; ▌Everis A. Hayes (Republican) 47%
California 9	Charles H. Randall	Prohibition	1914	Incumbent re-elected.	▌ ✓ Charles H. Randall (Prohibition) 53%; ▌Montaville Flowers (Republican) 43.3%; ▌Grace Silver Henry (Socialist) 3.7%
California 10	Henry Z. Osborne	Republican	1916	Incumbent re-elected.	▌ ✓ Henry Z. Osborne (Republican) 88.2%; ▌James H. Ryckman (Socialist) 11.8%
California 11	William Kettner	Democratic	1912	Incumbent re-elected.	▌ ✓ William Kettner (Democratic) 72.2%; ▌N. D. Hamilton (Prohibition) 27.8%

== Colorado ==
District	Incumbent			This race	
District	Member	Party	First elected	Results	Candidates
Colorado 1	Benjamin Hilliard	Democratic	1914	Incumbent lost re-election as an independent. Republican gain.	▌ ✓ William N. Vaile (Republican) 54.2%; ▌John L. Stack (Democratic) 31.9%; ▌Benjamin Hilliard (Independent) 11.9%; ▌Fred Underhill (Socialist) 2.0%
Colorado 2	Charles B. Timberlake	Republican	1914	Incumbent re-elected.	▌ ✓ Charles B. Timberlake (Republican) 61.5%; ▌R. E. Jones (Democratic) 38.5%
Colorado 3	Edward Keating	Democratic	1912	Incumbent lost re-election. Republican gain.	▌ ✓ Guy U. Hardy (Republican) 51.0%; ▌Edward Keating (Democratic) 46.7%; ▌Edith Halcomb (Socialist) 2.3%
Colorado 4	Edward T. Taylor	Democratic	1908	Incumbent re-elected.	▌ ✓ Edward T. Taylor (Democratic) 65.7%; ▌Straud M. Logan (Republican) 34.3%

== Connecticut ==
District	Incumbent			This race	
District	Member	Party	First elected	Results	Candidates
Connecticut 1	Augustine Lonergan	Democratic	1916	Incumbent re-elected.	▌ ✓ Augustine Lonergan (Democratic) 53.45%; ▌George A. Quigley (Republican) 42.59%; ▌Henry Vanderburgh (Socialist) 2.59%; Others: ▌George H. Wilder (Prohibition) 0.93%; ▌Patrick A. Murphy (Socialist Labor) 0.40%; ▌Gaius W. McClunie (Citizens) 0.04%
Connecticut 2	Richard P. Freeman	Republican	1914	Incumbent re-elected.	▌ ✓ Richard P. Freeman (Republican) 53.11%; ▌Frank P. Fenton (Democratic) 44.01%; Others: ▌Charles F. Muller (Socialist) 1.72%; ▌Arthur W. Chaffee (Prohibition) 0.74%; ▌Albert H. Frink (Socialist Labor) 0.34%; ▌Lester D. Schriver (National) 0.08%
Connecticut 3	John Q. Tilson	Republican	1914	Incumbent re-elected.	▌ ✓ John Q. Tilson (Republican) 50.51%; ▌Arthur B. O'Keefe (Democratic) 45.61%; ▌Walter E. Davis (Socialist) 2.92%; Others: ▌Herbert M. Hancock (Prohibition) 0.58%; ▌John D. Carlson (Socialist Labor) 0.39%
Connecticut 4	Schuyler Merritt	Republican	1917 (special)	Incumbent re-elected.	▌ ✓ Schuyler Merritt (Republican) 53.56%; ▌Charles J. Peck (Democratic) 43.36%; ▌Frederick Cederholm (Socialist) 2.33%; Others: ▌Charles B. Aliyn (Prohibition) 0.38%; ▌Carl A. Peterson (Socialist Labor) 0.32%; ▌Phillip A. Desilets (National) 0.05%
Connecticut 5	James P. Glynn	Republican	1914	Incumbent re-elected.	▌ ✓ James P. Glynn (Republican) 50.11%; ▌Edward L. Seery (Democratic) 47.07%; ▌Charles T. Peach (Socialist) 2.28%; ▌Eugene L. Richards (Prohibition) 0.53%

== Delaware ==
District	Incumbent			This race	
District	Member	Party	First elected	Results	Candidates
Delaware at-large	Albert F. Polk	Democratic	1916	Incumbent lost re-election. Republican gain.	▌ ✓ Caleb R. Layton (Republican) 51.40%; ▌Albert F. Polk (Democratic) 47.59%; ▌William H. Crawford (Socialist) 1.02%

== Florida ==
District	Incumbent			This race	
District	Member	Party	First elected	Results	Candidates
Florida 1	Herbert J. Drane	Democratic	1916	Incumbent re-elected.	▌ ✓ Herbert J. Drane (Democratic); Unopposed
Florida 2	Frank Clark	Democratic	1904	Incumbent re-elected.	▌ ✓ Frank Clark (Democratic); Unopposed
Florida 3	Walter Kehoe	Democratic	1916	Incumbent lost renomination. Democratic hold.	▌ ✓ John H. Smithwick (Democratic); Unopposed
Florida 4	William J. Sears	Democratic	1914	Incumbent re-elected.	▌ ✓ William J. Sears (Democratic); Unopposed

== Georgia ==
District	Incumbent			This race	
District	Member	Party	First elected	Results	Candidates
Georgia 1	James W. Overstreet	Democratic	1916	Incumbent re-elected.	▌ ✓ James W. Overstreet (Democratic); Unopposed
Georgia 2	Frank Park	Democratic	1913 (special)	Incumbent re-elected.	▌ ✓ Frank Park (Democratic); Unopposed
Georgia 3	Charles R. Crisp	Democratic	1912	Incumbent re-elected.	▌ ✓ Charles R. Crisp (Democratic); Unopposed
Georgia 4	William C. Wright	Democratic	1918 (special)	Incumbent re-elected.	▌ ✓ William C. Wright (Democratic); Unopposed
Georgia 5	William S. Howard	Democratic	1910	Incumbent retired to run for U.S. Senator. Democratic hold.	▌ ✓ William D. Upshaw (Democratic); Unopposed
Georgia 6	James W. Wise	Democratic	1914	Incumbent re-elected.	▌ ✓ James W. Wise (Democratic); Unopposed
Georgia 7	Gordon Lee	Democratic	1904	Incumbent re-elected.	▌ ✓ Gordon Lee (Democratic) 82.5%; ▌T. R. Glenn (Republican) 17.5%
Georgia 8	Charles H. Brand	Democratic	1916	Incumbent re-elected.	▌ ✓ Charles H. Brand (Democratic); Unopposed
Georgia 9	Thomas M. Bell	Democratic	1904	Incumbent re-elected.	▌ ✓ Thomas M. Bell (Democratic) 81.5%; ▌John M. Johnson (Republican) 18.5%
Georgia 10	Carl Vinson	Democratic	1914	Incumbent re-elected.	▌ ✓ Carl Vinson (Democratic); Unopposed
Georgia 11	John R. Walker	Democratic	1912	Incumbent lost renomination. Democratic hold.	▌ ✓ William C. Lankford (Democratic); Unopposed
Georgia 12	William W. Larsen	Democratic	1916	Incumbent re-elected.	▌ ✓ William W. Larsen (Democratic); Unopposed

== Idaho ==
This was the first election in which Idaho was divided into districts, formerly it had had a single at-large district with two seats.

District	Incumbent			This race	
District	Member	Party	First elected	Results	Candidates
Idaho 1	Burton L. French; Redistricted from the at-large district.	Republican	1916	Incumbent re-elected.	▌ ✓ Burton L. French (Republican) 63.35%; ▌L. I. Purcell (Democratic) 36.66%
Idaho 2	Addison T. Smith; Redistricted from the at-large district.	Republican	1912	Incumbent re-elected.	▌ ✓ Addison T. Smith (Republican) 63.16%; ▌C. R. Jeppesen (Democratic) 36.84%

== Illinois ==
District	Incumbent			This race	
District	Member	Party	First elected	Results	Candidates
Illinois 1	Martin B. Madden	Republican	1904	Incumbent re-elected.	▌ ✓ Martin B. Madden (Republican) 55.3%; ▌George Mayer (Democratic) 43.0%; ▌G. J. Carlisle (Socialist) 1.7%
Illinois 2	James R. Mann	Republican	1896	Incumbent re-elected.	▌ ✓ James R. Mann (Republican) 59.5%; ▌Leo S. LeBosky (Democratic) 36.6%; ▌Robert H. Howe (Socialist) 3.9%
Illinois 3	William W. Wilson	Republican	1914	Incumbent re-elected.	▌ ✓ William W. Wilson (Republican) 52.9%; ▌Fred J. Crowley (Democratic) 42.7%; ▌Joseph A. Ambros (Socialist) 4.4%
Illinois 4	John W. Rainey	Democratic	1918 (special)	Incumbent re-elected.	▌ ✓ John W. Rainey (Democratic) 94.6%; ▌Carl G. Hoffman (Socialist) 5.4%
Illinois 5	Adolph J. Sabath	Democratic	1906	Incumbent re-elected.	▌ ✓ Adolph J. Sabath (Democratic) 69.1%; ▌Louis C. Mau (Republican) 24.9%; ▌Emil Jaeger (Socialist) 6.0%
Illinois 6	James McAndrews	Democratic	1912	Incumbent re-elected.	▌ ✓ James McAndrews (Democratic) 55.9%; ▌Hervey C. Foster (Republican) 38.8%; ▌William F. Kruse (Socialist) 5.3%
Illinois 7	Niels Juul	Republican	1916	Incumbent re-elected.	▌ ✓ Niels Juul (Republican) 51.3%; ▌Frank M. Padden (Democratic) 38.0%; ▌J. Louis Engdahl (Socialist) 10.7%
Illinois 8	Thomas Gallagher	Democratic	1908	Incumbent re-elected.	▌ ✓ Thomas Gallagher (Democratic) 78.2%; ▌Dan Parrillo (Republican) 21.8%
Illinois 9	Frederick A. Britten	Republican	1912	Incumbent re-elected.	▌ ✓ Frederick A. Britten (Republican) 53.0%; ▌James H. Poage (Democratic) 42.2%; ▌Charles Kissling (Socialist) 4.7%
Illinois 10	George E. Foss	Republican	1914	Incumbent retired to run for U.S. Senator. Republican hold.	▌ ✓ Carl R. Chindblom (Republican) 62.1%; ▌Philip J. Finnegan (Democratic) 31.8%; ▌Irving St. John Tucker (Socialist) 6.2%
Illinois 11	Ira C. Copley	Republican	1910	Incumbent re-elected.	▌ ✓ Ira C. Copley (Republican) 92.9%; ▌Carl F. Schutz (Socialist) 7.1%
Illinois 12	Charles Eugene Fuller	Republican	1914	Incumbent re-elected.	▌ ✓ Charles Eugene Fuller (Republican) 93.4%; ▌Oscar Ogren (Socialist) 6.6%
Illinois 13	John C. McKenzie	Republican	1910	Incumbent re-elected.	▌ ✓ John C. McKenzie (Republican) 96.2%; ▌Shepherd H. Zimmerman (Socialist) 3.7%
Illinois 14	William J. Graham	Republican	1916	Incumbent re-elected.	▌ ✓ William J. Graham (Republican) 90.6%; ▌Edmond B. Passmore (Socialist) 7.9%; ▌Henry L. Wheelan (Prohibition) 1.5%
Illinois 15	Edward John King	Republican	1914	Incumbent re-elected.	▌ ✓ Edward John King (Republican) 60.2%; ▌Edward P. Allen (Democratic) 37.1%; ▌J. W. Connery (Socialist) 2.7%
Illinois 16	Clifford C. Ireland	Republican	1916	Incumbent re-elected.	▌ ✓ Clifford C. Ireland (Republican) 57.3%; ▌Leander O. Eagleton (Democratic) 41.0%; ▌J. J. Van Huss (Socialist) 1.7%
Illinois 17	John A. Sterling	Republican	1914	Incumbent died October 17, 1918. Republican hold.	▌ ✓ Frank L. Smith (Republican) 69.7%; ▌C. S. Schneider (Democratic) 30.3%
Illinois 18	Joseph G. Cannon	Republican	1914	Incumbent re-elected.	▌ ✓ Joseph G. Cannon (Republican) 60.3%; ▌Frank M. Crangle (Democratic) 38.7%; ▌Peter N. Christenson (Socialist) 1.0%
Illinois 19	William B. McKinley	Republican	1914	Incumbent re-elected.	▌ ✓ William B. McKinley (Republican) 60.8%; ▌Thomas B. Jack (Democratic) 38.1%; ▌J. A. Bishop (Socialist) 1.1%
Illinois 20	Henry T. Rainey	Democratic	1902	Incumbent re-elected.	▌ ✓ Henry T. Rainey (Democratic) 55.0%; ▌Frank E. Blane (Republican) 45.0%
Illinois 21	Loren E. Wheeler	Republican	1914	Incumbent re-elected.	▌ ✓ Loren E. Wheeler (Republican) 50.4%; ▌James M. Graham (Democratic) 47.1%; ▌James Bradley (Socialist) 2.5%
Illinois 22	William A. Rodenberg	Republican	1914	Incumbent re-elected.	▌ ✓ William A. Rodenberg (Republican) 51.3%; ▌J. Nick Perrin (Democratic) 43.5%; ▌Marshal E. Fitzpatrick (Socialist) 5.2%
Illinois 23	Martin D. Foster	Democratic	1906	Incumbent lost re-election. Republican gain.	▌ ✓ Edwin B. Brooks (Republican) 49.9%; ▌Martin D. Foster (Democratic) 46.9%; ▌Gustav Fritz (Socialist) 3.2%
Illinois 24	Thomas Sutler Williams	Republican	1914	Incumbent re-elected.	▌ ✓ Thomas Sutler Williams (Republican) 59.4%; ▌James R. Campbell (Democratic) 39.4%; ▌J. J. McGuinn (Socialist) 1.2%
Illinois 25	Edward E. Denison	Republican	1914	Incumbent re-elected.	▌ ✓ Edward E. Denison (Republican) 60.4%; ▌Dempsey T. Woodard (Democratic) 39.6%
Illinois At-large 2 seats on a general ticket	Medill McCormick	Republican	1916	Incumbent retired to run for U.S. Senator. Republican hold.	▌ ✓ Richard Yates Jr. (Republican) 28.2%; ▌ ✓ William E. Mason (Republican) 27.0%; ▌William E. Williams (Democratic) 20.3%; ▌Michael H. Cleary (Democratic) 20.0%; Others: ▌Clarence C. Brooks (Socialist) 1.9%; ▌Frank Watts (Socialist) 1.8%; ▌Edward E. Blake (Prohibition) 0.2%; ▌Charles P. Corson (Prohibition) 0.2%; ▌William Hartness (Socialist Labor) 0.2%; ▌Joseph Hamrie (Socialist Labor) 0.2%
Illinois At-large 2 seats on a general ticket	William E. Mason	Republican	1916	Incumbent re-elected.	▌ ✓ Richard Yates Jr. (Republican) 28.2%; ▌ ✓ William E. Mason (Republican) 27.0%; ▌William E. Williams (Democratic) 20.3%; ▌Michael H. Cleary (Democratic) 20.0%; Others: ▌Clarence C. Brooks (Socialist) 1.9%; ▌Frank Watts (Socialist) 1.8%; ▌Edward E. Blake (Prohibition) 0.2%; ▌Charles P. Corson (Prohibition) 0.2%; ▌William Hartness (Socialist Labor) 0.2%; ▌Joseph Hamrie (Socialist Labor) 0.2%

== Indiana ==
District	Incumbent			This race	
District	Member	Party	First elected	Results	Candidates
Indiana 1	George K. Denton	Democratic	1916	Incumbent lost re-election. Republican gain.	▌ ✓ Oscar R. Luhring (Republican) 52.0%; ▌George K. Denton (Democratic) 48.2%
Indiana 2	Oscar E. Bland	Republican	1916	Incumbent re-elected.	▌ ✓ Oscar E. Bland (Republican) 53.6%; ▌Fred F. Bays (Democratic) 44.2%; ▌Zimri W. Garten (Socialist) 2.2%
Indiana 3	William E. Cox	Democratic	1906	Incumbent lost re-election. Republican gain.	▌ ✓ James W. Dunbar (Republican) 50.3%; ▌William E. Cox (Democratic) 48.9%; ▌Alvin L. Ogle (Socialist) 0.7%
Indiana 4	Lincoln Dixon	Democratic	1904	Incumbent lost re-election. Republican gain.	▌ ✓ John S. Benham (Republican) 50.4%; ▌Lincoln Dixon (Democratic) 49.6%
Indiana 5	Everett Sanders	Republican	1916	Incumbent re-elected.	▌ ✓ Everett Sanders (Republican) 50.5%; ▌Ralph W. Moss (Democratic) 47.9%; ▌J. Harvey Caldwell (Socialist) 1.7%
Indiana 6	Richard N. Elliott	Republican	1917 (special)	Incumbent re-elected.	▌ ✓ Richard N. Elliott (Republican) 54.2%; ▌Harry G. Strickland (Democratic) 45.3%; ▌John Nipp (Socialist) 0.5%
Indiana 7	Merrill Moores	Republican	1914	Incumbent re-elected.	▌ ✓ Merrill Moores (Republican) 58.3%; ▌Chalmer Schlosser (Democratic) 39.8%; ▌William H. Henry (Socialist) 2.0%
Indiana 8	Albert H. Vestal	Republican	1916	Incumbent re-elected.	▌ ✓ Albert H. Vestal (Republican) 53.5%; ▌William H. Eichorn (Democratic) 43.1%; ▌George S. Martin (Socialist) 3.4%
Indiana 9	Fred S. Purnell	Republican	1916	Incumbent re-elected.	▌ ✓ Fred S. Purnell (Republican) 55.9%; ▌Charles F. Howard (Democratic) 41.6%; ▌John E. Brashear (Socialist) 1.3%; ▌James Horn (Prohibition) 1.2%
Indiana 10	William R. Wood	Republican	1914	Incumbent re-elected.	▌ ✓ William R. Wood (Republican) 61.4%; ▌George R. Kirschman (Democratic) 37.4%; ▌Erwin S. Whitmer (Socialist) 1.2%
Indiana 11	Milton Kraus	Republican	1916	Incumbent re-elected.	▌ ✓ Milton Kraus (Republican) 54.0%; ▌George W. Rauch (Democratic) 44.0%; ▌George Lanning (Socialist) 2.0%
Indiana 12	Louis W. Fairfield	Republican	1916	Incumbent re-elected.	▌ ✓ Louis W. Fairfield (Republican) 54.7%; ▌Harry H. Hilgeman (Democratic) 43.1%; ▌Henry Holman (Socialist) 2.2%
Indiana 13	Henry A. Barnhart	Democratic	1908 (special)	Incumbent lost re-election. Republican gain.	▌ ✓ Andrew J. Hickey (Republican) 52.8%; ▌Henry A. Barnhart (Democratic) 45.1%; ▌Warren Evans (Socialist) 2.1%

== Iowa ==
District	Incumbent			This race	
District	Member	Party	First elected	Results	Candidates
Iowa 1	Charles A. Kennedy	Republican	1906	Incumbent re-elected.	▌ ✓ Charles A. Kennedy (Republican) 60.6%; ▌Edward L. Hirsch (Democratic) 39.4%
Iowa 2	Harry E. Hull	Republican	1914	Incumbent re-elected.	▌ ✓ Harry E. Hull (Republican) 54.7%; ▌Nathan D. Ely (Democratic) 39.5%; ▌William E. McIntosh (Socialist) 5.9%
Iowa 3	Burton E. Sweet	Republican	1914	Incumbent re-elected.	▌ ✓ Burton E. Sweet (Republican) 64.7%; ▌Harry B. Clark (Democratic) 35.3%
Iowa 4	Gilbert N. Haugen	Republican	1898	Incumbent re-elected.	▌ ✓ Gilbert N. Haugen (Republican) 64.7%; ▌Joseph C. Campbell (Democratic) 35.3%
Iowa 5	James W. Good	Republican	1908	Incumbent re-elected.	▌ ✓ James W. Good (Republican) 65.1%; ▌Sherman W. DeWolf (Democratic) 34.9%
Iowa 6	C. William Ramseyer	Republican	1914	Incumbent re-elected.	▌ ✓ C. William Ramseyer (Republican) 56.1%; ▌Buell McCash (Democratic) 42.6%; ▌H. Grimes (Socialist) 1.3%
Iowa 7	Cassius C. Dowell	Republican	1914	Incumbent re-elected.	▌ ✓ Cassius C. Dowell (Republican) 66.8%; ▌H. C. Evans (Democratic) 31.2%; ▌Charles Gay (Socialist) 2.1%
Iowa 8	Horace M. Towner	Republican	1910	Incumbent re-elected.	▌ ✓ Horace M. Towner (Republican) 64.4%; ▌D. Fulton Rice (Democratic) 35.6%
Iowa 9	William R. Green	Republican	1911 (special)	Incumbent re-elected.	▌ ✓ William R. Green (Republican) 99.8%; Scattering 0.2%
Iowa 10	Frank P. Woods	Republican	1908	Incumbent lost renomination. Republican hold.	▌ ✓ L. J. Dickinson (Republican) 64.2%; ▌J. R. Files (Democratic) 35.8%
Iowa 11	George Cromwell Scott	Republican	1916	Incumbent retired. Republican hold.	▌ ✓ William D. Boies (Republican) 56.4%; ▌Thomas J. Steele (Democratic) 42.8%; ▌G. F. Dietrich (Socialist) 0.8%

== Kansas ==
District	Incumbent			This race	
District	Member	Party	First elected	Results	Candidates
Kansas 1	Daniel R. Anthony Jr.	Republican	1907 (special)	Incumbent re-elected.	▌ ✓ Daniel R. Anthony Jr. (Republican) 65.0%; ▌Frank E. Whitney (Democratic) 32.9%; ▌George Stahlman (Socialist) 2.1%
Kansas 2	Edward C. Little	Republican	1916	Incumbent re-elected.	▌ ✓ Edward C. Little (Republican) 57.2%; ▌Henderson S. Martin (Democratic) 40.8%; ▌Gertrude Crumb Harman (Socialist) 2.0%
Kansas 3	Philip P. Campbell	Republican	1902	Incumbent re-elected.	▌ ✓ Philip P. Campbell (Republican) 54.8%; ▌C. E. Pile (Democratic) 38.1%; ▌S. J. Mattox (Socialist) 4.7%; ▌Robert T. Herrick (Independent) 2.4%
Kansas 4	Dudley Doolittle	Democratic	1912	Incumbent lost re-election. Republican gain.	▌ ✓ Homer Hoch (Republican) 58.8%; ▌Dudley Doolittle (Democratic) 38.9%; ▌W. S. Armour (Socialist) 2.2%
Kansas 5	Guy T. Helvering	Democratic	1912	Incumbent lost re-election. Republican gain.	▌ ✓ James G. Strong (Republican) 60.8%; ▌Guy T. Helvering (Democratic) 37.0%; ▌Jake Myers (Socialist) 2.2%
Kansas 6	John R. Connelly	Democratic	1912	Incumbent lost re-election. Republican gain.	▌ ✓ Hays B. White (Republican) 55.4%; ▌John R. Connelly (Democratic) 41.7%; ▌Dan Beddy (Socialist) 2.9%
Kansas 7	Jouett Shouse	Democratic	1914	Incumbent lost re-election. Republican gain.	▌ ✓ Jasper N. Tincher (Republican) 56.2%; ▌Jouett Shouse (Democratic) 41.1%; ▌Mrs. Clyde Condron Jeffryes (Socialist) 2.7%
Kansas 8	William Augustus Ayres	Democratic	1914	Incumbent re-elected.	▌ ✓ William Augustus Ayres (Democratic) 51.2%; ▌Charles C. Mack (Republican) 46.9%; ▌S. O. Coble (Socialist) 1.9%

== Kentucky ==
District	Incumbent			This race	
District	Member	Party	First elected	Results	Candidates
Kentucky 1	Alben W. Barkley	Democratic	1912	Incumbent re-elected.	▌ ✓ Alben W. Barkley (Democratic) 66.8%; ▌W. G. Howard (Republican) 33.2%
Kentucky 2	David Hayes Kincheloe	Democratic	1914	Incumbent re-elected.	▌ ✓ David Hayes Kincheloe (Democratic) 57.7%; ▌Ben T. Robinson (Republican) 42.3%
Kentucky 3	Robert Y. Thomas Jr.	Democratic	1908	Incumbent re-elected.	▌ ✓ Robert Y. Thomas Jr. (Democratic) 52.3%; ▌Bishop S. Huntsman (Republican) 47.7%
Kentucky 4	Ben Johnson	Democratic	1906	Incumbent re-elected.	▌ ✓ Ben Johnson (Democratic) 52.4%; ▌John P. Haswell (Republican) 47.6%
Kentucky 5	J. Swagar Sherley	Democratic	1902	Incumbent lost re-election. Republican gain.	▌ ✓ Charles F. Ogden (Republican) 51.3%; ▌J. Swagar Sherley (Democratic) 48.7%
Kentucky 6	Arthur B. Rouse	Democratic	1910	Incumbent re-elected.	▌ ✓ Arthur B. Rouse (Democratic) 68.3%; ▌Virgil Weaver (Republican) 31.7%
Kentucky 7	J. Campbell Cantrill	Democratic	1908	Incumbent re-elected.	▌ ✓ J. Campbell Cantrill (Democratic) 60.9%; ▌A. B. Hammond (Republican) 39.1%
Kentucky 8	Harvey Helm	Democratic	1906	Incumbent re-elected.	▌ ✓ Harvey Helm (Democratic) 52.8%; ▌Robert L. Davidson (Republican) 47.2%
Kentucky 9	William J. Fields	Democratic	1910	Incumbent re-elected.	▌ ✓ William J. Fields (Democratic) 54.6%; ▌Trumbo Snedegar (Republican) 45.4%
Kentucky 10	John W. Langley	Republican	1906	Incumbent re-elected.	▌ ✓ John W. Langley (Republican) 67.1%; ▌David Hays (Democratic) 32.9%
Kentucky 11	Caleb Powers	Republican	1910	Incumbent retired. Republican hold.	▌ ✓ John M. Robsion (Republican) 76.4%; ▌Nat E. Elliott (Democratic) 23.6%

== Louisiana ==
District	Incumbent			This race	
District	Member	Party	First elected	Results	Candidates
Louisiana 1	Albert Estopinal	Democratic	1908	Incumbent re-elected.	▌ ✓ Albert Estopinal (Democratic); Unopposed
Louisiana 2	H. Garland Dupré	Democratic	1910	Incumbent re-elected.	▌ ✓ H. Garland Dupré (Democratic); Unopposed
Louisiana 3	Whitmell P. Martin	Progressive	1914	Incumbent re-elected as Democrat. Democratic gain.	▌ ✓ Whitmell P. Martin (Democratic); Unopposed
Louisiana 4	John T. Watkins	Democratic	1904	Incumbent re-elected.	▌ ✓ John T. Watkins (Democratic); Unopposed
Louisiana 5	Riley J. Wilson	Democratic	1914	Incumbent re-elected.	▌ ✓ Riley J. Wilson (Democratic); Unopposed
Louisiana 6	Jared Y. Sanders Sr.	Democratic	1916	Incumbent re-elected.	▌ ✓ Jared Y. Sanders Sr. (Democratic); Unopposed
Louisiana 7	Ladislas Lazaro	Democratic	1912	Incumbent re-elected.	▌ ✓ Ladislas Lazaro (Democratic); Unopposed
Louisiana 8	James Benjamin Aswell	Democratic	1912	Incumbent re-elected.	▌ ✓ James Benjamin Aswell (Democratic); Unopposed

== Maine ==
District	Incumbent			This race	
District	Member	Party	First elected	Results	Candidates
Maine 1	Louis B. Goodall	Republican	1916	Incumbent re-elected.	▌ ✓ Louis B. Goodall (Republican) 53.8%; ▌L. B. Swett (Democratic) 46.2%
Maine 2	Wallace H. White	Republican	1916	Incumbent re-elected.	▌ ✓ Wallace H. White (Republican) 54.2%; ▌Daniel J. McGillicuddy (Democratic) 45.8%
Maine 3	John A. Peters	Republican	1913 (special)	Incumbent re-elected.	▌ ✓ John A. Peters (Republican) 57.6%; ▌Edward Chase (Democratic) 42.4%
Maine 4	Ira G. Hersey	Republican	1916	Incumbent re-elected.	▌ ✓ Ira G. Hersey (Republican) 58.1%; ▌Leon G. Brown (Democratic) 41.9%

== Maryland ==
District	Incumbent			This race	
District	Member	Party	First elected	Results	Candidates
Maryland 1	Jesse Price	Democratic	1914	Incumbent lost re-election. Republican gain.	▌ ✓ William N. Andrews (Republican) 50.5%; ▌Jesse Price (Democratic) 49.5%
Maryland 2	J. Frederick C. Talbott	Democratic	1902	Incumbent died October 5, 1918. Democratic hold.	▌ ✓ Carville Benson (Democratic) 54.3%; ▌Charles J. Hull (Republican) 44.6%; ▌William H. Champlin (Socialist) 1.1%
Maryland 3	Charles P. Coady	Democratic	1912	Incumbent re-elected.	▌ ✓ Charles P. Coady (Democratic) 58.4%; ▌Charles A. Jording (Republican) 38.8%; ▌William A. Toole (Socialist) 2.8%
Maryland 4	J. Charles Linthicum	Democratic	1910	Incumbent re-elected.	▌ ✓ J. Charles Linthicum (Democratic) 57.0%; ▌Walter E. Knickman (Republican) 41.6%; ▌Charles B. Lazzell (Socialist) 1.4%
Maryland 5	Sydney Emanuel Mudd II	Republican	1914	Incumbent re-elected.	▌ ✓ Sydney Emanuel Mudd II (Republican) 53.7%; ▌Frank M. Duvall (Democratic) 44.5%; ▌James L. Smiley (Socialist) 1.9%
Maryland 6	Frederick N. Zihlman	Republican	1916	Incumbent re-elected.	▌ ✓ Frederick N. Zihlman (Republican) 54.9%; ▌Henry Dorsey Etchison (Democratic) 42.4%; ▌Sylvester L. V. Young (Socialist) 2.6%

== Massachusetts ==
District	Incumbent			This race	
District	Member	Party	First elected	Results	Candidates
Massachusetts 1	Allen T. Treadway	Republican	1912	Incumbent re-elected.	▌ ✓ Allen T. Treadway (Republican) 58.30%; ▌Thomas F. Cassidy (Democratic) 41.70%
Massachusetts 2	Frederick H. Gillett	Republican	1892	Incumbent re-elected.	▌ ✓ Frederick H. Gillett (Republican) 99.93%
Massachusetts 3	Calvin Paige	Republican	1913 (special)	Incumbent re-elected.	▌ ✓ Calvin Paige (Republican) 60.47%; ▌Eaton D. Sargent (Democratic) 39.53%
Massachusetts 4	Samuel Winslow	Republican	1912	Incumbent re-elected.	▌ ✓ Samuel Winslow (Republican) 52.50%; ▌John F. McGrath (Democratic) 47.49%
Massachusetts 5	John Jacob Rogers	Republican	1912	Incumbent re-elected.	▌ ✓ John Jacob Rogers (Republican) 99.23%
Massachusetts 6	Willfred W. Lufkin	Republican	1917 (special)	Incumbent re-elected.	▌ ✓ Willfred W. Lufkin (Republican) 88.86%; ▌Estus E. Eames (Socialist) 11.13%
Massachusetts 7	Michael F. Phelan	Democratic	1912	Incumbent re-elected.	▌ ✓ Michael F. Phelan (Democratic) 57.31%; ▌Charles Cabot Johnson (Republican) 42.69%
Massachusetts 8	Frederick W. Dallinger	Republican	1914	Incumbent re-elected.	▌ ✓ Frederick W. Dallinger (Republican) 60.31%; ▌James E. Aylward (Democratic) 39.69%
Massachusetts 9	Alvan T. Fuller	Republican	1916	Incumbent re-elected.	▌ ✓ Alvan T. Fuller (Republican) 68.69%; ▌Henry C. Rowland (Democratic) 31.31%
Massachusetts 10	Peter Francis Tague	Democratic	1914	Incumbent Democrat lost re-election as an independent challenger. Democratic hold.	▌ ✓ John F. Fitzgerald (Democratic) 47.28%; ▌Peter Francis Tague (Independent) 45.72%; ▌Hammond T. Fletcher (Republican) 6.99%
Massachusetts 10	Peter Francis Tague	Democratic	1914	Election successfully contested. Incumbent re-seated October 23, 1919. Democratic hold.	▌ ✓ Peter Francis Tague (Democrat as Independent); ▌ John F. Fitzgerald (Democratic)
Massachusetts 11	George H. Tinkham	Republican	1914	Incumbent re-elected.	▌ ✓ George H. Tinkham (Republican) 56.43%; ▌Francis J. Horgan (Democratic) 43.55%
Massachusetts 12	James A. Gallivan	Democratic	1914 (special)	Incumbent re-elected.	▌ ✓ James A. Gallivan (Democratic) 70.41%; ▌Harrison H. Atwood (Republican) 29.58%
Massachusetts 13	William Henry Carter	Republican	1914	Incumbent retired. Republican hold.	▌ ✓ Robert Luce (Republican) 59.28%; ▌Aloysius J. Doon (Democratic) 40.71%
Massachusetts 14	Richard Olney	Democratic	1914	Incumbent re-elected.	▌ ✓ Richard Olney (Democratic) 56.56%; ▌Louis F. R. Langelier (Republican) 43.44%
Massachusetts 15	William S. Greene	Republican	1898 (special)	Incumbent re-elected.	▌ ✓ William S. Greene (Republican) 61.73%; ▌Arthur J. B. Cartier (Democratic) 38.27%
Massachusetts 16	Joseph Walsh	Republican	1914	Incumbent re-elected.	▌ ✓ Joseph Walsh (Republican) 62.40%; ▌Frederic Tudor (Democratic) 37.59%

== Michigan ==
District	Incumbent			This race	
District	Member	Party	First elected	Results	Candidates
Michigan 1	Frank E. Doremus	Democratic	1910	Incumbent re-elected.	▌ ✓ Frank E. Doremus (Republican) 60.3%; ▌James W. Hanley (Democratic) 37.6%; ▌Nathan M. Welch (Socialist) 2.0%
Michigan 2	Samuel Beakes	Democratic	1912	Incumbent lost re-election. Republican gain.	▌ ✓ Earl C. Michener (Republican) 55.7%; ▌Samuel Beakes (Democratic) 43.5%; Others: ▌Milton V. Breitmayer (Socialist) 0.7%; ▌Ernest J. Moore (Socialist Labor) 0.1%
Michigan 3	John M. C. Smith	Republican	1910	Incumbent re-elected.	▌ ✓ John M. C. Smith (Republican) 61.7%; ▌Howard W. Cavanagh (Democratic) 36.9%; Others: ▌Will H. Ressequie (Socialist) 1.3%; ▌W. Spencer (Unknown) 0.1%
Michigan 4	Edward L. Hamilton	Republican	1896	Incumbent re-elected.	▌ ✓ Edward L. Hamilton (Republican) 65.8%; ▌James O'Hara (Democratic) 34.2%
Michigan 5	Carl E. Mapes	Republican	1912	Incumbent re-elected.	▌ ✓ Carl E. Mapes (Republican) 66.8%; ▌Peter J. Danhof (Democratic) 31.5%; ▌George W. Eldredge (Socialist) 1.7%
Michigan 6	Patrick H. Kelley	Republican	1912	Incumbent re-elected.	▌ ✓ Patrick H. Kelley (Republican) 97.3%; ▌Oscar Sand (Socialist) 2.7%
Michigan 7	Louis C. Cramton	Republican	1912	Incumbent re-elected.	▌ ✓ Louis C. Cramton (Republican) 73.3%; ▌John W. Scully (Democratic) 25.5%; ▌John Dubel (Socialist) 1.2%
Michigan 8	Joseph W. Fordney	Republican	1898	Incumbent re-elected.	▌ ✓ Joseph W. Fordney (Republican) 62.8%; ▌Miles J. Purcell (Democratic) 37.2%
Michigan 9	James C. McLaughlin	Republican	1906	Incumbent re-elected.	▌ ✓ James C. McLaughlin (Republican) 66.4%; ▌Charles M. Black (Democratic) 31.3%; ▌Edward Genia (Socialist) 2.3%
Michigan 10	Gilbert A. Currie	Republican	1916	Incumbent re-elected.	▌ ✓ Gilbert A. Currie (Republican) 68.0%; ▌Henry C. Haller (Democratic) 30.7%; ▌George Aplin (Socialist) 1.3%
Michigan 11	Frank D. Scott	Republican	1914	Incumbent re-elected.	▌ ✓ Frank D. Scott (Republican) 66.7%; ▌Michael J. Doyle (Democratic) 33.3%
Michigan 12	W. Frank James	Republican	1914	Incumbent re-elected.	▌ ✓ W. Frank James (Republican) 69.8%; ▌Albert S. Ley (Democratic) 26.9%; ▌John Kuskila (Socialist) 3.2%
Michigan 13	Charles Archibald Nichols	Republican	1914	Incumbent re-elected.	▌ ✓ Charles Archibald Nichols (Republican) 66.9%; ▌Louis W. McClear (Democratic) 31.7%; ▌Maurice Sugar (Socialist) 1.4%

== Minnesota ==
District	Incumbent			This race	
District	Member	Party	First elected	Results	Candidates
Minnesota 1	Sydney Anderson	Republican	1910	Incumbent re-elected.	▌ ✓ Sydney Anderson (Republican); Unopposed
Minnesota 2	Franklin Ellsworth	Republican	1914	Incumbent re-elected.	▌ ✓ Franklin Ellsworth (Republican) 69.0%; ▌Frank Simon (Democratic) 31.0%
Minnesota 3	Charles Russell Davis	Republican	1902	Incumbent re-elected.	▌ ✓ Charles Russell Davis (Republican) 53.4%; ▌John J. Farrell (Democratic) 46.6%
Minnesota 4	Carl Van Dyke	Democratic	1914	Incumbent re-elected.	▌ ✓ Carl Van Dyke (Democratic) 62.0%; ▌Walter Mallory (Republican) 38.0%
Minnesota 5	Ernest Lundeen	Republican	1916	Incumbent lost renomination. Republican hold.	▌ ✓ Walter Newton (Republican) 57.6%; ▌James Robertson (Democratic) 42.4%
Minnesota 6	Harold Knutson	Republican	1916	Incumbent re-elected.	▌ ✓ Harold Knutson (Republican) 72.3%; ▌P. J. Russell (Democratic) 27.7%
Minnesota 7	Andrew Volstead	Republican	1902	Incumbent re-elected.	▌ ✓ Andrew Volstead (Republican) 56.3%; ▌Engebret E. Lobeck (National) 43.7%
Minnesota 8	Clarence B. Miller	Republican	1908	Incumbent lost re-election. Farmer–Labor gain.	▌ ✓ William L. Carss (Farmer–Labor) 57.1%; ▌Clarence B. Miller (Republican) 42.9%
Minnesota 9	Halvor Steenerson	Republican	1902	Incumbent re-elected.	▌ ✓ Halvor Steenerson (Republican); Unopposed
Minnesota 10	Thomas D. Schall	Republican	1914	Incumbent re-elected.	▌ ✓ Thomas D. Schall (Republican) 71.1%; ▌Henry A. Finlayson (Democratic) 28.9%

== Mississippi ==
District	Incumbent			This race	
District	Member	Party	First elected	Results	Candidates
Mississippi 1	Ezekiel S. Candler Jr.	Democratic	1900	Incumbent re-elected.	▌ ✓ Ezekiel S. Candler Jr. (Democratic); Unopposed
Mississippi 2	Hubert D. Stephens	Democratic	1910	Incumbent re-elected.	▌ ✓ Hubert D. Stephens (Democratic); Unopposed
Mississippi 3	Benjamin G. Humphreys II	Democratic	1902	Incumbent re-elected.	▌ ✓ Benjamin G. Humphreys II (Democratic); Unopposed
Mississippi 4	Thomas U. Sisson	Democratic	1908	Incumbent re-elected.	▌ ✓ Thomas U. Sisson (Democratic) 96.3%; ▌J. G. Adams (Socialist) 3.7%
Mississippi 5	William W. Venable	Democratic	1916 (special)	Incumbent re-elected.	▌ ✓ William W. Venable (Democratic); Unopposed
Mississippi 6	Pat Harrison	Democratic	1910	Incumbent retired to run for U.S. Senator. Democratic hold.	▌ ✓ Paul B. Johnson Sr. (Democratic) 94.3%; ▌F. T. Maxwell (Socialist) 5.7%
Mississippi 7	Percy Quin	Democratic	1912	Incumbent re-elected.	▌ ✓ Percy Quin (Democratic) 93.4%; ▌J. B. Sternberger (Socialist) 6.6%
Mississippi 8	James W. Collier	Democratic	1908	Incumbent re-elected.	▌ ✓ James W. Collier (Democratic) 98.8%; ▌W. T. Roberts (Unknown) 1.2%

== Missouri ==
District	Incumbent			This race	
District	Member	Party	First elected	Results	Candidates
Missouri 1	Milton A. Romjue	Democratic	1916	Incumbent re-elected.	▌ ✓ Milton A. Romjue (Democratic) 54.19%; ▌Frank C. Millspaugh (Republican) 44.95%; ▌Edward H. Willey (Socialist) 0.86%
Missouri 2	William W. Rucker	Democratic	1898	Incumbent re-elected.	▌ ✓ William W. Rucker (Democratic) 98.70%; ▌George H. Cox (Socialist) 0.89%; ▌Don C. McVay (Republican write-in) 0.40%
Missouri 3	Joshua W. Alexander	Democratic	1906	Incumbent re-elected.	▌ ✓ Joshua W. Alexander (Democratic) 52.89%; ▌John E. Frost (Republican) 46.93%; ▌William Garrett (Socialist) 0.18%
Missouri 4	Charles F. Booher	Democratic	1906	Incumbent re-elected.	▌ ✓ Charles F. Booher (Democratic) 51.67%; ▌J. C. McNeeley (Republican) 48.02%; ▌Joseph Kunzelman (Socialist) 0.31%
Missouri 5	William P. Borland	Democratic	1908	Incumbent lost renomination. Democratic hold.	▌ ✓ William T. Bland (Democratic) 62.71%; ▌Albert L. Reeves (Republican) 36.84%; ▌William J. Adams (Socialist) 0.45%
Missouri 6	Clement C. Dickinson	Democratic	1910 (special)	Incumbent re-elected.	▌ ✓ Clement C. Dickinson (Democratic) 52.71%; ▌William O. Atkeson (Republican) 46.66%; ▌Louis Schneider (Socialist) 0.63%
Missouri 7	Courtney W. Hamlin	Democratic	1906	Incumbent lost renomination. Democratic hold.	▌ ✓ Samuel C. Major (Democratic) 49.75%; ▌James D. Salts (Republican) 49.56%; ▌Jonathan H. Allison (Socialist) 0.69%
Missouri 8	Dorsey W. Shackleford	Democratic	1899 (special)	Incumbent lost renomination. Democratic hold.	▌ ✓ William L. Nelson (Democratic) 50.36%; ▌North Todd Gentry (Republican) 49.64%
Missouri 9	Champ Clark	Democratic	1896	Incumbent re-elected.	▌ ✓ Champ Clark (Democratic) 51.68%; ▌Bernard H. Dyer (Republican) 47.35%; ▌Henry Shumaker (Socialist) 0.97%
Missouri 10	Jacob E. Meeker	Republican	1914	Incumbent died October 16, 1918. Republican hold. Winner was not elected to finish the term; see above.	▌ ✓ Cleveland A. Newton (Republican) 60.17%; ▌Harlow E. Read (Democratic) 35.92%; ▌William M. Brandt (Socialist) 3.56%; ▌Ernest Snavely (Socialist Labor) 0.35%
Missouri 11	William L. Igoe	Democratic	1912	Incumbent re-elected.	▌ ✓ William L. Igoe (Democratic) 96.76%; ▌Will C. Long (Socialist) 3.17%
Missouri 12	Leonidas C. Dyer	Republican	1914	Incumbent re-elected.	▌ ✓ Leonidas C. Dyer (Republican) 58.91%; ▌Samuel Rosenfeld (Democratic) 39.88%; Others: ▌Chris Rocker (Socialist) 1.05%; ▌Karl Oberheu (Socialist Labor) 0.16%
Missouri 13	Walter Lewis Hensley	Democratic	1910	Incumbent retired. Republican gain.	▌ ✓ Marion E. Rhodes (Republican) 51.41%; ▌Arthur T. Brewster (Democratic) 47.92%; ▌William Cunningham (Socialist) 0.66%
Missouri 14	Joseph J. Russell	Democratic	1910	Incumbent lost re-election. Republican gain.	▌ ✓ Edward D. Hays (Republican) 50.53%; ▌Joseph J. Russell (Democratic) 49.42%; ▌James Campbell (Socialist) 0.05%
Missouri 15	Perl D. Decker	Democratic	1912	Incumbent lost re-election. Republican gain.	▌ ✓ Isaac V. McPherson (Republican) 51.00%; ▌Perl D. Decker (Democratic) 47.52%; ▌David Landis (Socialist) 1.48%
Missouri 16	Thomas L. Rubey	Democratic	1910	Incumbent re-elected.	▌ ✓ Thomas L. Rubey (Democratic) 49.85%; ▌Samuel A. Shelton (Republican) 49.22%; ▌Henry M. Fouty (Socialist) 0.93%

== Montana ==
District	Incumbent			This race	
District	Member	Party	First elected	Results	Candidates
Montana 1	John M. Evans; Redistricted from the at-large district.	Democratic	1912	Incumbent re-elected.	▌ ✓ John M. Evans (Democratic) 47.9%; ▌Frank B. Linderman (Republican) 42.1%; ▌Tom Kane (National) 10.0%
Montana 1	Jeannette Rankin; Redistricted from the at-large district.	Republican	1916	Incumbent retired to run for U.S. Senator. Republican loss.	▌ ✓ John M. Evans (Democratic) 47.9%; ▌Frank B. Linderman (Republican) 42.1%; ▌Tom Kane (National) 10.0%
Montana 2	None (new district)			New seat. Republican gain.	▌ ✓ Carl W. Riddick (Republican) 49.4%; ▌Harry B. Mitchell (Democratic) 45.1%; ▌Joseph Pope (National) 5.5%

== Nebraska ==
District	Incumbent			This race	
District	Member	Party	First elected	Results	Candidates
Nebraska 1	C. Frank Reavis	Republican	1914	Incumbent re-elected.	▌ ✓ C. Frank Reavis (Republican) 62.3%; ▌Frank A. Peterson (Democratic) 37.7%
Nebraska 2	Charles O. Lobeck	Democratic	1910	Incumbent lost re-election. Republican gain.	▌ ✓ Albert W. Jefferis (Republican) 50.9%; ▌Charles O. Lobeck (Democratic) 49.1%
Nebraska 3	Dan V. Stephens	Democratic	1911 (special)	Incumbent lost re-election. Republican gain.	▌ ✓ Robert E. Evans (Republican) 52.0%; ▌Dan V. Stephens (Democratic) 48.0%
Nebraska 4	Charles H. Sloan	Republican	1910	Incumbent retired. Republican hold.	▌ ✓ Melvin O. McLaughlin (Republican) 58.1%; ▌William H. Smith (Democratic) 40.8%; ▌Thomas C. Birmingham (Prohibition) 1.1%
Nebraska 5	Ashton C. Shallenberger	Democratic	1914	Incumbent lost re-election. Republican gain.	▌ ✓ William E. Andrews (Republican) 50.8%; ▌Ashton C. Shallenberger (Democratic) 49.2%
Nebraska 6	Moses Kinkaid	Republican	1902	Incumbent re-elected.	▌ ✓ Moses Kinkaid (Republican) 60.8%; ▌Charles W. Pool (Democratic) 37.9%; ▌Lincoln Steffins (Prohibition) 1.3%

== Nevada ==
District	Incumbent			This race	
District	Member	Party	First elected	Results	Candidates
Nevada at-large	Edwin E. Roberts	Republican	1910	Incumbent retired to run for U.S. Senator. Democratic gain.	▌ ✓ Charles R. Evans (Democratic) 51.3%; ▌Sylvester S. Downer (Republican) 43.1%; ▌H. H. Cordill (Socialist) 5.6%

== New Hampshire ==
District	Incumbent			This race	
District	Member	Party	First elected	Results	Candidates
New Hampshire 1	Sherman Everett Burroughs	Republican	1916	Incumbent re-elected.	▌ ✓ Sherman Everett Burroughs (Republican) 52.14%; ▌William N. Rogers (Democratic) 47.85%
New Hampshire 2	Edward Hills Wason	Republican	1914	Incumbent re-elected.	▌ ✓ Edward Hills Wason (Republican) 56.45%; ▌Harry F. Lake (Democratic) 43.55%

== New Jersey ==
District	Incumbent			This race	
District	Member	Party	First elected	Results	Candidates
New Jersey 1	William J. Browning	Republican	1911 (special)	Incumbent re-elected.	▌ ✓ William J. Browning (Republican) 63.8%; ▌Edward S. Dickerson (Democratic) 28.5%; ▌Charles E. Lane (Prohibition) 4.9%; ▌George F. Noftsker (Socialist) 2.8%
New Jersey 2	Isaac Bacharach	Republican	1914	Incumbent re-elected.	▌ ✓ Isaac Bacharach (Republican) 67.9%; ▌John T. French (Democratic) 28.2%; ▌Levi B. Sharp (Prohibition) 3.9%
New Jersey 3	Thomas J. Scully	Democratic	1910	Incumbent re-elected.	▌ ✓ Thomas J. Scully (Democratic) 53.1%; ▌Robert Carson (Republican) 45.4%; ▌James G. Mason (Prohibition) 1.6%
New Jersey 4	Elijah C. Hutchinson	Republican	1914	Incumbent re-elected.	▌ ✓ Elijah C. Hutchinson (Republican) 55.1%; ▌George O. Vanerbilt (Democratic) 44.9%
New Jersey 5	John H. Capstick	Republican	1914	Incumbent died March 17, 1918. Republican hold.	▌ ✓ Ernest R. Ackerman (Republican) 52.6%; ▌Richard E. Clement (Democratic) 40.7%; ▌James B. Furber (Socialist) 5.3%; ▌William H. Clarke (Prohibition) 1.4%
New Jersey 6	John R. Ramsey	Republican	1916	Incumbent re-elected.	▌ ✓ John R. Ramsey (Republican) 53.3%; ▌Robert A. Sibbald (Democratic) 44.4%; ▌Charles P. DeYoe (Prohibition) 2.3%
New Jersey 7	Dow H. Drukker	Republican	1914 (special)	Incumbent retired. Republican hold.	▌ ✓ Amos H. Radcliffe (Republican) 53.6%; ▌Joseph A. Delaney (Democratic) 36.7%; ▌William H. Derrick (Socialist) 7.1%; Others: ▌Charles M. Berdan (Prohibition) 1.7%; ▌Anderson (National) 0.9%
New Jersey 8	Edward W. Gray	Republican	1914	Incumbent retired to run for U.S. Senator. Democratic gain.	▌ ✓ Cornelius A. McGlennon (Democratic) 52.4%; ▌William B. Ross (Republican) 43.6%; ▌William K. Tallon (Socialist) 4.0%
New Jersey 9	Richard W. Parker	Republican	1914 (special)	Incumbent lost re-election. Democratic gain.	▌ ✓ Daniel F. Minahan (Democratic) 50.4%; ▌Richard W. Parker (Republican) 42.8%; ▌Steven Bircher (Socialist) 6.0%; ▌Benjamin F. Biershing (Independent) 0.8%
New Jersey 10	Frederick R. Lehlbach	Republican	1914	Incumbent re-elected.	▌ ✓ Frederick R. Lehlbach (Republican) 48.3%; ▌Dallas Flanagan (Democratic) 46.1%; ▌Charles H. Poole (Socialist) 5.6%
New Jersey 11	John J. Eagan	Democratic	1912	Incumbent re-elected.	▌ ✓ John J. Eagan (Democratic) 67.5%; ▌Edward Brennan (Republican) 23.5%; ▌Gertrude Reilly (Socialist) 9.0%
New Jersey 12	James A. Hamill	Democratic	1906	Incumbent re-elected.	▌ ✓ James A. Hamill (Democratic) 70.8%; ▌Theodore L. Bierch (Republican) 24.1%; ▌Valentine Bausch (Socialist) 5.1%

== New Mexico ==
District	Incumbent			This race	
District	Member	Party	First elected	Results	Candidates
New Mexico at-large	William B. Walton	Democratic	1916	Incumbent retired to run for U.S. Senator. Republican gain.	▌ ✓ Benigno C. Hernández (Republican) 50.7%; ▌Granville A. Richardson (Democratic) 48.1%; ▌W. B. Dillon (Socialist) 1.2%

== New York ==
District	Incumbent			This race	
District	Member	Party	First elected	Results	Candidates
New York 1	Frederick C. Hicks	Republican	1914	Incumbent re-elected.	▌ ✓ Frederick C. Hicks (Republican) 96.6%; ▌George Sieburg (Socialist) 3.4%
New York 2	C. Pope Caldwell	Democratic	1914	Incumbent re-elected.	▌ ✓ C. Pope Caldwell (Democratic) 85.9%; ▌William Burkle (Socialist) 14.1%
New York 3	Joseph V. Flynn	Democratic	1914	Incumbent retired. Republican gain.	▌ ✓ John MacCrate (Republican) 48.9%; ▌Michael Fogarty (Independent) 34.1%; ▌Joseph A. Whitehorn (Socialist) 17.0%
New York 4	John J. Delaney; Redistricted from the 7th district	Democratic	1918 (special)	Incumbent retired. Democratic hold.	▌ ✓ Thomas H. Cullen (Democratic) 75.2%; ▌Ralph Waldo Bowman (Republican) 21.4%; ▌George S. Rumpler (Socialist) 3.3%
New York 5	None (new district)			New seat. Democratic gain.	▌ ✓ John B. Johnston (Democratic) 55.8%; ▌George A. Green (Republican) 41.5%; ▌Hugo Peters (Socialist) 2.7%
New York 6	Frederick W. Rowe	Republican	1914	Incumbent re-elected.	▌ ✓ Frederick W. Rowe (Republican) 46.6%; ▌Franklin Taylor (Democratic) 46.0%; ▌Bernard J. Riley (Socialist) 7.4%
New York 7	Harry H. Dale; Redistricted from the 4th district	Democratic	1912	Incumbent retired to become judge of the magistrates court. Democratic loss.	▌ ✓ James P. Maher (Democratic) 58.9%; ▌John Hill Morgan (Republican) 27.7%; ▌James O'Neal (Socialist) 13.4%
New York 7	James P. Maher; Redistricted from the 5th district	Democratic	1910	Incumbent re-elected.	▌ ✓ James P. Maher (Democratic) 58.9%; ▌John Hill Morgan (Republican) 27.7%; ▌James O'Neal (Socialist) 13.4%
New York 8	William E. Cleary	Democratic	1918 (special)	Incumbent re-elected.	▌ ✓ William E. Cleary (Democratic) 54.5%; ▌Allison L. Adams (Republican) 33.5%; ▌Abraham H. Shulman (Socialist) 11.6%; ▌Robert E. Neidig (Prohibition) 0.4%
New York 9	Oscar W. Swift	Republican	1914	Incumbent lost re-election. Democratic gain.	▌ ✓ David J. O'Connell (Democratic) 45.8%; ▌Oscar W. Swift (Republican) 43.5%; ▌Wilhelmus B. Robinson (Socialist) 10.7%
New York 10	Reuben L. Haskell	Republican	1914	Incumbent re-elected.	▌ ✓ Reuben L. Haskell (Republican) 40.2%; ▌George W. Martin (Democratic) 36.7%; ▌Abraham I. Shiplacoff (Socialist) 23.0%
New York 11	Daniel J. Riordan	Democratic	1906 (special)	Incumbent re-elected.	▌ ✓ Daniel J. Riordan (Democratic) 71.2%; ▌William H. Michales (Republican) 23.4%; ▌Elinor Byrns (Socialist) 4.1%; ▌George Weber (Prohibition) 1.3%
New York 12	Meyer London	Socialist	1914	Incumbent lost re-election. Democratic gain.	▌ ✓ Henry M. Goldfogle (Democratic) 52.9%; ▌Meyer London (Socialist) 47.0%; Others: ▌Wilbur F. Rawlins (Prohibition) 0.1%; ▌Benjamin W. Burger (Independent) 0.0%
New York 13	Christopher D. Sullivan	Democratic	1916	Incumbent re-elected.	▌ ✓ Christopher D. Sullivan (Democratic) 66.4%; ▌Algernon Lee (Socialist) 33.4%; ▌Flavius J. Perry (Prohibition) 0.3%
New York 14	Fiorello La Guardia	Republican	1916	Incumbent re-elected.	▌ ✓ Fiorello La Guardia (Republican) 69.7%; ▌Scott Nearing (Socialist) 29.8%; ▌Alfred H. Saunders (Prohibition) 0.4%
New York 15	Peter J. Dooling; Redistricted from the 16th district	Democratic	1912	Incumbent re-elected.	▌ ✓ Peter J. Dooling (Democratic) 78.4%; ▌Jacob I. Wiener (Republican) 17.9%; ▌Fanny Witherspoon (Socialist) 3.2%; ▌Herbert D. Burnham (Prohibition) 0.5%
New York 16	Thomas Francis Smith; Redistricted from the 15th district	Democratic	1917 (special)	Incumbent re-elected.	▌ ✓ Thomas Francis Smith (Democratic) 71.9%; ▌Thomas Rock (Republican) 20.9%; ▌Samuel E. Beardsley (Socialist) 6.9%; ▌James F. Gillespie (Prohibition) 0.3%
New York 17	George B. Francis; Redistricted from the 18th district	Republican	1916	Incumbent retired. Democratic gain.	▌ ✓ Herbert Pell (Democratic) 50.2%; ▌Frederick C. Tanner (Republican) 45.7%; ▌Julius Halpern (Socialist) 3.7%; ▌Richard G. Green (Prohibition) 0.3%
New York 18	John F. Carew; Redistricted from the 17th district	Democratic	1912	Incumbent re-elected.	▌ ✓ John F. Carew (Democratic) 71.2%; ▌Julius M. Leder (Republican) 14.4%; ▌Pauline Newman (Socialist) 14.2%; ▌Claude Maybell (Prohibition) 0.2%
New York 19	Walter M. Chandler	Republican	1912	Incumbent lost re-election. Democratic gain.	▌ ✓ Joseph Rowan (Democratic) 48.3%; ▌Walter M. Chandler (Republican) 44.8%; ▌Theresa Malkiel (Socialist) 6.4%; ▌Ralph E. Myers (Prohibition) 0.5%
New York 20	Isaac Siegel	Republican	1914	Incumbent re-elected.	▌ ✓ Isaac Siegel (Republican) 60.9%; ▌Morris Hillquit (Socialist) 38.8%; ▌Charles H. Simmons (Prohibition) 0.2%
New York 21	Jerome F. Donovan	Democratic	1918 (special)	Incumbent re-elected.	▌ ✓ Jerome F. Donovan (Democratic) 53.4%; ▌John A. Bolles (Republican) 41.2%; ▌George Frazier Miller (Socialist) 5.1%; ▌Edward A. Packer (Prohibition) 0.3%
New York 22	Anthony J. Griffin	Democratic	1918 (special)	Incumbent re-elected.	▌ ✓ Anthony J. Griffin (Democratic) 69.9%; ▌Sadie Kost (Republican) 16.2%; ▌Patrick J. Murphy (Socialist) 13.3%; ▌John G. Tait (Prohibition) 0.5%
New York 23	Daniel C. Oliver	Democratic	1916	Incumbent retired. Democratic hold.	▌ ✓ Richard F. McKiniry (Democratic) 55.2%; ▌Owen A. Haley (Republican) 25.1%; ▌Max Geisler (Socialist) 19.7%
New York 24	Benjamin L. Fairchild	Republican	1916	Incumbent lost re-election. Democratic gain.	▌ ✓ James V. Ganly (Democratic) 44.3%; ▌Benjamin L. Fairchild (Republican) 41.8%; ▌Irvin E. Klein (Socialist) 13.9%
New York 25	James W. Husted	Republican	1914	Incumbent re-elected.	▌ ✓ James W. Husted (Republican) 56.2%; ▌Arthur O. Sherman (Democratic) 40.5%; ▌Bradford Jones (Socialist) 2.5%; ▌Collin F. Jewell (Prohibition) 0.8%
New York 26	Edmund Platt	Republican	1912	Incumbent re-elected.	▌ ✓ Edmund Platt (Republican) 57.1%; ▌George A. Coleman (Democratic) 39.4%; Others: ▌Elbert Knapp (Prohibition) 1.8%; ▌Alfred C. Perkins (Socialist) 1.7%
New York 27	Charles B. Ward	Republican	1914	Incumbent re-elected.	▌ ✓ Charles B. Ward (Republican) 53.8%; ▌John K. Evans (Democratic) 44.7%; ▌Rolland E. Miles (Socialist) 1.4%
New York 28	Rollin B. Sanford	Republican	1914	Incumbent re-elected.	▌ ✓ Rollin B. Sanford (Republican) 54.5%; ▌Joseph A. Lawson (Democratic) 43.8%; ▌Allen C. Depew (Socialist) 1.8%
New York 29	James S. Parker	Republican	1912	Incumbent re-elected.	▌ ✓ James S. Parker (Republican) 62.3%; ▌Gustavus A. Rogers (Democratic) 34.3%; ▌Charles E. Robbins (Prohibition) 2.0%; ▌D. V. Linehan (Socialist) 1.4%
New York 30	George R. Lunn	Democratic	1916	Incumbent lost re-election. Republican gain.	▌ ✓ Frank Crowther (Republican) 47.9%; ▌George R. Lunn (Democratic) 46.7%; ▌Herbert M. Merrill (Socialist) 5.5%
New York 31	Bertrand Snell	Republican	1915 (special)	Incumbent re-elected.	▌ ✓ Bertrand Snell (Republican) 71.6%; ▌Elizabeth Arthur (Democratic) 24.4%; ▌Franklin D. Wallace (Prohibition) 3.7%; ▌Samuel G. Cline (Socialist) 0.3%
New York 32	Luther W. Mott	Republican	1910	Incumbent re-elected.	▌ ✓ Luther W. Mott (Republican) 63.2%; ▌Charles A. Hitchcock (Democratic) 30.2%; ▌Stephen R. Lockwood (Prohibition) 5.6%; ▌George H. Rockburn (Socialist) 1.0%
New York 33	Homer P. Snyder	Republican	1914	Incumbent re-elected.	▌ ✓ Homer P. Snyder (Republican) 54.0%; ▌Clarence E. Williams (Democratic) 40.5%; ▌Enoch Ochstrand (Prohibition) 2.9%; ▌John Latimore (Socialist) 2.5%
New York 34	George W. Fairchild	Republican	1906	Incumbent retired. Republican hold.	▌ ✓ William H. Hill (Republican) 57.4%; ▌Lavern P. Butts (Democratic) 32.4%; ▌Julius E. Rogers (Prohibition) 9.5%; ▌Arthur G. Breckinridge (Socialist) 0.7%
New York 35	Walter W. Magee	Republican	1914	Incumbent re-elected.	▌ ✓ Walter W. Magee (Republican) 59.3%; ▌Ben Wiles (Democratic) 32.4%; ▌Edward G. Dietrich (Prohibition) 4.4%; ▌Frank Heck (Socialist) 3.9%
New York 36	Norman J. Gould	Republican	1915 (special)	Incumbent re-elected.	▌ ✓ Norman J. Gould (Republican) 70.9%; ▌Everett E. Calman (Democratic) 29.1%
New York 37	Harry H. Pratt	Republican	1914	Incumbent lost renomination. Republican hold.	▌ ✓ Alanson B. Houghton (Republican) 62.9%; ▌Frederick W. Palmer (Democratic) 35.8%; ▌Chauncey L. Hurlbut (Socialist) 1.4%
New York 38	Thomas B. Dunn	Republican	1912	Incumbent re-elected.	▌ ✓ Thomas B. Dunn (Republican) 62.1%; ▌Jacob Gerling (Democratic) 27.8%; ▌John W. Dennis (Socialist) 6.9%; ▌Algernon S. Cropsey (Prohibition) 3.2%
New York 39	Archie D. Sanders	Republican	1916	Incumbent re-elected.	▌ ✓ Archie D. Sanders (Republican) 68.9%; ▌Clara B. Mann (Democratic) 28.8%; ▌George Weber (Socialist) 2.4%
New York 40	S. Wallace Dempsey	Republican	1914	Incumbent re-elected.	▌ ✓ S. Wallace Dempsey (Republican) 63.0%; ▌Matthew P. Young (Democratic) 31.7%; ▌Lee P. Smith (Socialist) 5.4%
New York 41	Charles Bennett Smith	Democratic	1910	Incumbent lost re-election. Republican gain.	▌ ✓ Clarence MacGregor (Republican) 41.2%; ▌Charles B. Smith (Democratic) 41.2%; ▌Franklin P. Brill (Socialist) 17.6%
New York 42	William F. Waldow	Republican	1916	Incumbent lost re-election. Democratic gain.	▌ ✓ James M. Mead (Democratic) 46.2%; ▌William F. Waldow (Republican) 43.2%; ▌Hattie Kreuger (Socialist) 8.7%; ▌John H. Stoody (Prohibition) 1.8%
New York 43	Charles Mann Hamilton	Republican	1912	Incumbent retired. Republican hold.	▌ ✓ Daniel A. Reed (Republican) 73.4%; ▌Frank H. Mott (Democratic) 23.3%; ▌Gust C. Peterson (Socialist) 3.3%

== North Carolina ==
District	Incumbent			This race	
District	Member	Party	First elected	Results	Candidates
North Carolina 1	John Humphrey Small	Democratic	1898	Incumbent re-elected.	▌ ✓ John Humphrey Small (Democratic) 75.4%; ▌C. R. Pugh (Republican) 24.6%
North Carolina 2	Claude Kitchin	Democratic	1900	Incumbent re-elected.	▌ ✓ Claude Kitchin (Democratic); Unopposed
North Carolina 3	George E. Hood	Democratic	1914	Incumbent retired. Democratic hold.	▌ ✓ Samuel M. Brinson (Democratic) 59.3%; ▌Claude R. Wheatley (Republican) 40.7%
North Carolina 4	Edward W. Pou	Democratic	1900	Incumbent re-elected.	▌ ✓ Edward W. Pou (Democratic) 68.1%; ▌Robert H. Dixon (Republican) 31.9%
North Carolina 5	Charles Manly Stedman	Democratic	1910	Incumbent re-elected.	▌ ✓ Charles Manly Stedman (Democratic) 55.9%; ▌John W. Kurfees (Republican) 44.1%
North Carolina 6	Hannibal L. Godwin	Democratic	1906	Incumbent re-elected.	▌ ✓ Hannibal L. Godwin (Democratic) 72.1%; ▌Alexander L. McCaskill (Republican) 27.9%
North Carolina 7	Leonidas D. Robinson	Democratic	1916	Incumbent re-elected.	▌ ✓ Leonidas D. Robinson (Democratic) 56.4%; ▌James D. Gregg (Republican) 43.6%
North Carolina 8	Robert L. Doughton	Democratic	1910	Incumbent re-elected.	▌ ✓ Robert L. Doughton (Democratic) 53.8%; ▌Frank A. Linney (Republican) 46.2%
North Carolina 9	Edwin Y. Webb	Democratic	1902	Incumbent re-elected.	▌ ✓ Edwin Y. Webb (Democratic) 57.0%; ▌Charles A. Jonas (Republican) 43.0%
North Carolina 10	Zebulon Weaver	Democratic	1916	Incumbent re-elected.	▌ ✓ Zebulon Weaver (Democratic) 51.7%; ▌James Jefferson Britt (Republican) 48.3%

== North Dakota ==
District	Incumbent			This race	
District	Member	Party	First elected	Results	Candidates
North Dakota 1	John M. Baer	Republican-NPL	1917 (special)	Incumbent re-elected.	▌ ✓ John M. Baer (Republican) 55.1%; ▌Fred Bartholomew (Democratic) 44.9%
North Dakota 2	George M. Young	Republican	1912	Incumbent re-elected.	▌ ✓ George M. Young (Republican) 74.5%; ▌L. N. Torson (Democratic) 25.5%
North Dakota 3	Patrick Norton	Republican	1912	Incumbent retired. Republican hold.	▌ ✓ James H. Sinclair (Republican) 68.8%; ▌Halvor Halvorson (Democratic) 31.2%

== Ohio ==
District	Incumbent			This race	
District	Member	Party	First elected	Results	Candidates
Ohio 1	Nicholas Longworth	Republican	1914	Incumbent re-elected.	▌ ✓ Nicholas Longworth (Republican) 56.5%; ▌Sidney G. Stricker (Democratic) 43.5%
Ohio 2	Victor Heintz	Republican	1916	Incumbent retired. Republican hold.	▌ ✓ Ambrose E. B. Stephens (Republican) 52.1%; ▌Richard A. Powell (Democratic) 44.8%; ▌Jonathan Gartelman (Socialist) 3.1%
Ohio 3	Warren Gard	Democratic	1912	Incumbent re-elected.	▌ ✓ Warren Gard (Democratic) 49.2%; ▌Charles W. Dustin (Republican) 44.2%; ▌Jonathan M. Cahalane (Socialist) 6.6%
Ohio 4	Benjamin F. Welty	Democratic	1916	Incumbent re-elected.	▌ ✓ Benjamin F. Welty (Democratic) 50.5%; ▌J. Edward Russell (Republican) 49.5%
Ohio 5	John S. Snook	Democratic	1916	Incumbent lost re-election. Republican gain.	▌ ✓ Charles J. Thompson (Republican) 52.6%; ▌John S. Snook (Democratic) 47.4%
Ohio 6	Charles C. Kearns	Republican	1914	Incumbent re-elected.	▌ ✓ Charles C. Kearns (Republican) 52.8%; ▌A. G. Turnipseed (Democratic) 47.2%
Ohio 7	Simeon D. Fess	Republican	1914	Incumbent re-elected.	▌ ✓ Simeon D. Fess (Republican) 61.6%; ▌George H. Thorne (Democratic) 37.5%; ▌John A. Rehm (Socialist) 0.9%
Ohio 8	John A. Key	Democratic	1912	Incumbent lost re-election. Republican gain.	▌ ✓ R. Clint Cole (Republican) 52.9%; ▌John A. Key (Democratic) 47.1%
Ohio 9	Isaac R. Sherwood	Democratic	1906	Incumbent re-elected.	▌ ✓ Isaac R. Sherwood (Democratic) 55.1%; ▌James M. Ashley (Republican) 40.3%; ▌Solon T. Klotz (Socialist) 4.6%
Ohio 10	Robert M. Switzer	Republican	1910	Incumbent lost renomination. Republican hold.	▌ ✓ Israel M. Foster (Republican); Unopposed
Ohio 11	Horatio C. Claypool	Democratic	1916	Incumbent lost re-election. Republican gain.	▌ ✓ Edwin D. Ricketts (Republican) 53.5%; ▌Horatio C. Claypool (Democratic) 46.5%
Ohio 12	Clement Laird Brumbaugh	Democratic	1912	Incumbent re-elected.	▌ ✓ Clement Laird Brumbaugh (Democratic) 50.5%; ▌John C. Speaks (Republican) 47.8%; ▌Jacob L. Bachman (Socialist) 1.7%
Ohio 13	Arthur W. Overmyer	Democratic	1914	Incumbent lost re-election. Republican gain.	▌ ✓ James T. Begg (Republican) 53.0%; ▌Arthur W. Overmyer (Democratic) 46.1%; ▌William O. McClory (Socialist) 0.9%
Ohio 14	Ellsworth R. Bathrick	Democratic	1916	Incumbent died December 23, 1917. Democratic hold. Winner was also elected to finish the current term; see above.	▌ ✓ Martin L. Davey (Democratic) 50.3%; ▌Charles W. F. Dick (Republican) 46.8%; ▌Cyrus M. Mantell (Socialist) 2.9%
Ohio 15	George White	Democratic	1916	Incumbent lost re-election. Republican gain.	▌ ✓ C. Ellis Moore (Republican) 52.4%; ▌George White (Democratic) 47.6%
Ohio 16	Roscoe C. McCulloch	Republican	1914	Incumbent re-elected.	▌ ✓ Roscoe C. McCulloch (Republican) 61.3%; ▌Joseph C. Breitenstein (Democratic) 36.4%; ▌Joseph Bower (Socialist) 2.4%
Ohio 17	William A. Ashbrook	Democratic	1906	Incumbent re-elected.	▌ ✓ William A. Ashbrook (Democratic) 52.1%; ▌William M. Morgan (Republican) 47.9%
Ohio 18	David Hollingsworth	Republican	1914	Incumbent retired. Republican hold.	▌ ✓ B. Frank Murphy (Republican) 53.0%; ▌William B. Francis (Democratic) 47.0%
Ohio 19	John G. Cooper	Republican	1914	Incumbent re-elected.	▌ ✓ John G. Cooper (Republican) 95.6%; ▌Joseph Cooper (Socialist) 4.4%
Ohio 20	William Gordon	Democratic	1912	Incumbent lost renomination. Democratic hold.	▌ ✓ Charles A. Mooney (Democratic) 55.0%; ▌Jerry R. Zmunt (Republican) 38.3%; ▌Charles Emil Ruthenberg (Socialist) 6.8%
Ohio 21	Robert Crosser	Democratic	1912	Incumbent lost renomination. Democratic hold.	▌ ✓ John J. Babka (Democratic) 55.9%; ▌Harry L. Vail (Republican) 37.5%; ▌Tom Clifford (Socialist) 6.6%
Ohio 22	Henry I. Emerson	Republican	1914	Incumbent re-elected.	▌ ✓ Henry I. Emerson (Republican); Unopposed

== Oklahoma ==
District	Incumbent			This race	
District	Member	Party	First elected	Results	Candidates
Oklahoma 1	Thomas A. Chandler	Republican	1916	Incumbent lost re-election. Democratic gain.	▌ ✓ Everette B. Howard (Democratic) 50.5%; ▌Thomas A. Chandler (Republican) 47.6%; ▌E. E. Sonnanstine (Socialist) 1.8%
Oklahoma 2	William W. Hastings	Democratic	1914	Incumbent re-elected.	▌ ✓ William W. Hastings (Democratic) 58.9%; ▌Gus H. Tinch (Republican) 39.0%; ▌J. A. Lewis (Socialist) 2.1%
Oklahoma 3	Charles D. Carter	Democratic	1907 (new state)	Incumbent re-elected.	▌ ✓ Charles D. Carter (Democratic) 66.8%; ▌H. J. Fowler (Republican) 29.8%; ▌R. M. Price (Socialist) 3.4%
Oklahoma 4	Tom D. McKeown	Democratic	1916	Incumbent re-elected.	▌ ✓ Tom D. McKeown (Democratic) 56.9%; ▌E. R. Waite (Republican) 39.9%; ▌William H. Conley (Socialist) 3.2%
Oklahoma 5	Joseph B. Thompson	Democratic	1912	Incumbent re-elected.	▌ ✓ Joseph B. Thompson (Democratic) 57.4%; ▌B. A. McAleer (Republican) 39.6%; ▌J. Luther Langston (Socialist) 2.9%; ▌Alonzo Turner (Independent) 0.1%
Oklahoma 6	Scott Ferris	Democratic	1907 (new state)	Incumbent re-elected.	▌ ✓ Scott Ferris (Democratic) 55.9%; ▌L. A. Holmes (Republican) 39.5%; ▌H. C. Diehl (Socialist) 4.7%
Oklahoma 7	James V. McClintic	Democratic	1914	Incumbent re-elected.	▌ ✓ James V. McClintic (Democratic) 59.7%; ▌C. B. Leedy (Republican) 32.2%; ▌Orville E. Enfield (Socialist) 8.1%
Oklahoma 8	Dick T. Morgan	Republican	1908	Incumbent re-elected.	▌ ✓ Dick T. Morgan (Republican) 56.4%; ▌C. H. Hyde (Democratic) 39.1%; ▌H. L. Branham (Socialist) 4.3%; ▌Manuel Herrick (Independent) 0.2%

== Oregon ==
District	Incumbent			This race	
District	Member	Party	First elected	Results	Candidates
Oregon 1	Willis C. Hawley	Republican	1906	Incumbent re-elected.	▌ ✓ Willis C. Hawley (Republican) 89.6%; ▌Harlin Talbert (Socialist) 10.4%
Oregon 2	Nicholas J. Sinnott	Republican	1912	Incumbent re-elected.	▌ ✓ Nicholas J. Sinnott (Republican) 61.3%; ▌James Harvey (Democratic) 35.0%; ▌H. Warmholtz (Socialist) 3.7%
Oregon 3	Clifton N. McArthur	Republican	1914	Incumbent re-elected.	▌ ✓ Clifton N. McArthur (Republican) 48.4%; ▌John S. Smith (Democratic) 32.7%; ▌Walter Lafferty (Ind. National) 15.9%; ▌Harry M. Wicks (Socialist) 3.1%

== Pennsylvania ==
District	Incumbent			This race	
District	Member	Party	First elected	Results	Candidates
Pennsylvania 1	William S. Vare	Republican	1912 (special)	Incumbent re-elected.	▌ ✓ William S. Vare (Republican) 76.43%; ▌Paul B. Cassidy (Democratic) 20.91%; ▌John Leonard Silvey (Socialist) 2.20%; ▌Harvey McCort (Prohibition) 0.46%
Pennsylvania 2	George S. Graham	Republican	1912	Incumbent re-elected.	▌ ✓ George S. Graham (Republican) 81.51%; ▌John H. Berkley (Democratic) 17.01%; Others: ▌Harry Seidman (Socialist) 1.20%; ▌William Denick (Prohibition) 0.28%
Pennsylvania 3	J. Hampton Moore	Republican	1906	Incumbent re-elected.	▌ ✓ J. Hampton Moore (Republican) 78.84%; ▌William A. Hayes (Democratic) 19.79%; ▌John Fuchs (Socialist) 1.37%
Pennsylvania 4	George W. Edmonds	Republican	1912	Incumbent re-elected.	▌ ✓ George W. Edmonds (Republican) 68.81%; ▌Joseph E. Fabian (Democratic) 28.24%; ▌Jacob H. Root (Socialist) 2.46%; ▌John S. Hay (Prohibition) 0.50%
Pennsylvania 5	Peter E. Costello	Republican	1914	Incumbent re-elected.	▌ ✓ Peter E. Costello (Republican) 69.61%; ▌Emanuel R. Clinton (Democratic) 30.39%
Pennsylvania 6	George P. Darrow	Republican	1914	Incumbent re-elected.	▌ ✓ George P. Darrow (Republican) 72.14%; ▌John K. Laughlin (Democratic) 26.76%; ▌John Fisler (Progressive) 1.09%
Pennsylvania 7	Thomas S. Butler	Republican	1896	Incumbent re-elected.	▌ ✓ Thomas S. Butler (Republican) 76.06%; ▌James G. Milbourn (Democratic) 21.34%; Others: ▌Luther S. Kauffman (Prohibition) 1.86%; ▌Howard B. Melody (Socialist) 0.72%
Pennsylvania 8	Henry Winfield Watson	Republican	1914	Incumbent re-elected.	▌ ✓ Henry Winfield Watson (Republican) 63.38%; ▌Harry E. Grim (Democratic) 33.47%; Others: ▌Elmer H. Young (Socialist) 1.66%; ▌Theodore Koons (Prohibition) 1.44%
Pennsylvania 9	William W. Griest	Republican	1908	Incumbent re-elected.	▌ ✓ William W. Griest (Republican) 77.14%; ▌Austin E. McCollough (Democratic) 20.12%; ▌S. S. Watts (Prohibition) 2.74%
Pennsylvania 10	John R. Farr	Republican	1910	Incumbent lost re-election. Democratic gain. (Note: The election was overturned by Congress in 1921 due to fraud.)	▌ ✓ Patrick McLane (Democratic) 49.97%; ▌John R. Farr (Republican) 49.11%; ▌Edward Robling (Socialist) 0.92%
Pennsylvania 10	John R. Farr	Republican	1910	Election successfully contested. Incumbent re-seated February 25, 1921. Republican hold.	▌ ✓ John R. Farr (Republican); ▌ Patrick McLane (Democratic)
Pennsylvania 11	Thomas W. Templeton	Republican	1916	Incumbent retired. Democratic gain.	▌ ✓ John J. Casey (Democratic) 50.06%; ▌Edmund N. Carpenter (Republican) 49.94%
Pennsylvania 12	Robert D. Heaton	Republican	1914	Incumbent retired. Republican hold.	▌ ✓ John Reber (Republican) 57.29%; ▌James J. Moran (Democratic) 41.21%; ▌F. C. Clarke (Socialist) 1.50%
Pennsylvania 13	Arthur G. Dewalt	Democratic	1914	Incumbent re-elected.	▌ ✓ Arthur G. Dewalt (Democratic) 51.88%; ▌J. Wilmer Fisher (Democratic) 40.95%; ▌L. Birch Wilson Jr. (Socialist) 6.29%; ▌E. J. Fithian (Prohibition) 0.89%
Pennsylvania 14	Louis T. McFadden	Republican	1914	Incumbent re-elected.	▌ ✓ Louis T. McFadden (Republican) 66.02%; ▌A. M. Cornell (Democratic) 28.56%; ▌Edwin P. Young (Prohibition) 4.73%; ▌William Shellenberger (Socialist) 0.69%
Pennsylvania 15	Edgar R. Kiess	Republican	1912	Incumbent re-elected.	▌ ✓ Edgar R. Kiess (Republican) 63.81%; ▌Charles E. Spotts (Democratic) 33.24%; ▌P. A. McGowan (Socialist) 2.94%
Pennsylvania 16	John V. Lesher	Democratic	1912	Incumbent re-elected.	▌ ✓ John V. Lesher (Democratic) 48.69%; ▌Albert W. Duy (Democratic) 47.57%; ▌W. W. Haffner (Prohibition) 2.26%; ▌J. S. Ray (Socialist) 1.45%
Pennsylvania 17	Benjamin K. Focht	Republican	1914	Incumbent re-elected.	▌ ✓ Benjamin K. Focht (Republican) 58.98%; ▌Scott S. Lelby (Democratic) 39.93%; ▌George Bingham (Socialist) 1.05%
Pennsylvania 18	Aaron S. Kreider	Republican	1912	Incumbent re-elected.	▌ ✓ Aaron S. Kreider (Republican) 86.20%; ▌John A. Sprenkle (Prohibition) 10.02%; ▌John W. Coldren (Socialist) 3.53%
Pennsylvania 19	John M. Rose	Republican	1916	Incumbent re-elected.	▌ ✓ John M. Rose (Republican) 61.43%; ▌Bernard J. Clark (Democratic) 36.35%; ▌R. G. Seaman (Socialist) 2.21%
Pennsylvania 20	Andrew R. Brodbeck	Democratic	1916	Incumbent lost re-election. Republican gain.	▌ ✓ Edward S. Brooks (Republican) 52.45%; ▌Andrew R. Brodbeck (Democratic) 46.18%; ▌C. William Thompson (Socialist) 1.35%
Pennsylvania 21	Charles H. Rowland	Republican	1914	Incumbent retired. Republican hold.	▌ ✓ Evan J. Jones (Republican) 56.45%; ▌William E. Tobias (Democratic) 39.94%; ▌Harry W. Brown (Prohibition) 3.60%
Pennsylvania 22	Edward E. Robbins	Republican	1916	Incumbent re-elected.	▌ ✓ Edward E. Robbins (Republican) 61.09%; ▌George H. McWherter (Democratic) 35.26%; ▌Max Cenis (Socialist) 3.66%
Pennsylvania 23	Bruce F. Sterling	Democratic	1916	Incumbent lost re-election. Republican gain.	▌ ✓ Samuel A. Kendall (Republican) 50.11%; ▌Bruce F. Sterling (Democratic) 48.31%; ▌Louis S. Mellinger (Socialist) 1.58%
Pennsylvania 24	Henry W. Temple	Republican	1912	Incumbent re-elected.	▌ ✓ Henry W. Temple (Republican) 69.10%; ▌William M. Hartman (Democratic) 27.12%; ▌Walter V. Tyler (Socialist) 3.79%
Pennsylvania 25	Henry Alden Clark	Republican	1916	Incumbent retired. Republican hold.	▌ ✓ Milton W. Shreve (Republican) 50.96%; ▌Charles N. Crosby (Democratic) 40.01%; ▌Ralph W. Tillotson (Socialist) 4.87%; ▌William H. Kerschner (Prohibition) 4.11%
Pennsylvania 26	Henry J. Steele	Democratic	1914	Incumbent re-elected.	▌ ✓ Henry J. Steele (Democratic) 49.42%; ▌Francis A. March Jr. (Republican) 40.71%; ▌Delbert Strader Bachman (Prohibition) 8.47%; ▌John B. Lerch (Socialist) 1.40%
Pennsylvania 27	Nathan L. Strong	Republican	1916	Incumbent re-elected.	▌ ✓ Nathan L. Strong (Republican) 70.71%; ▌Don C. Corbett (Democratic) 27.16%; ▌Frank H. Brantlinger (Socialist) 2.12%
Pennsylvania 28	Earl H. Beshlin	Democratic	1917 (special)	Incumbent lost re-election. Republican gain.	▌ ✓ Willis J. Hulings (Republican) 54.99%; ▌Earl H. Beshlin (Democratic) 42.38%; ▌M. V. Ball (Socialist) 2.60%
Pennsylvania 29	Stephen G. Porter	Republican	1910	Incumbent re-elected.	▌ ✓ Stephen G. Porter (Republican) 88.97%; ▌C. G. Porter (Prohibition) 5.71%; ▌Henry Peter (Socialist) 5.32%
Pennsylvania 30	M. Clyde Kelly	Progressive	1916	Incumbent re-elected as a Republican. Republican gain.	▌ ✓ M. Clyde Kelly (Republican) 90.50%; ▌H. J. Lohr (Socialist) 9.50%
Pennsylvania 31	John M. Morin	Republican	1912	Incumbent re-elected.	▌ ✓ John M. Morin (Republican) 91.35%; ▌William A. Prosser (Socialist) 5.01%; ▌F. C. Brittain (Prohibition) 3.63%
Pennsylvania 32	Guy E. Campbell	Democratic	1916	Incumbent re-elected.	▌ ✓ Guy E. Campbell (Democratic) 87.23%; ▌John W. Slayton (Socialist) 6.59%; ▌William C. Wallace (Prohibition) 6.18%
Pennsylvania at-large	John R. K. Scott	Republican	1914	Incumbent resigned January 5, 1919; Republican hold.	▌ ✓ William J. Burke (Republican) 16.05%; ▌ ✓ Mahlon M. Garland (Republican) 15.55%; ▌ ✓ Thomas S. Crago (Republican) 15.51%; ▌ ✓ Anderson H. Walters (Republican) 15.44%; ▌Joseph F. Gorman (Democratic) 8.13%; ▌J. Calvin Strayer (Democratic) 7.89%; ▌Samuel R. Tarner (Democratic) 7.78%; ▌Fred Ikeler (Democratic) 7.76%; Others: ▌O. D. Brubaker (Prohibition) 0.86%; ▌Elisha Kent Kane (Prohibition) 0.78%; ▌Albert Gaddis (Prohibition) 0.74%; ▌E. L. McKee (Prohibition) 0.70%; ▌Cora M. Bixker (Socialist) 0.68%; ▌Henry W. Schlegel (Socialist) 0.64%; ▌John C. Euler (Socialist) 0.63%; ▌Harry T. Vaughn (Socialist) 0.62%; ▌John W. Dix (Single Tax) 0.07%; ▌Lewis Ryan (Single Tax) 0.06%; ▌Oliver McKnight (Single Tax) 0.06%; ▌Calvin B. Power (Single Tax) 0.05%
Pennsylvania at-large	Thomas S. Crago	Republican	1914	Incumbent re-elected.	
Pennsylvania at-large	Joseph McLaughlin	Republican	1916	Incumbent lost renomination. Republican hold.	
Pennsylvania at-large	Mahlon M. Garland	Republican	1914	Incumbent re-elected.	

== Rhode Island ==
District	Incumbent			This race	
District	Member	Party	First elected	Results	Candidates
Rhode Island 1	George F. O'Shaunessy	Democratic	1910	Incumbent retired to run for U.S. Senator. Republican gain.	▌ ✓ Clark Burdick (Republican) 54.3%; ▌Theodore F. Green (Democratic) 43.4%; ▌Joseph M. Coldwell (Socialist) 2.3%
Rhode Island 2	Walter R. Stiness	Republican	1914	Incumbent re-elected.	▌ ✓ Walter R. Stiness (Republican) 56.0%; ▌Stephen J. Casey (Democratic) 41.6%; ▌Washington I. Bucklin (Socialist) 2.4%
Rhode Island 3	Ambrose Kennedy	Republican	1912	Incumbent re-elected.	▌ ✓ Ambrose Kennedy (Republican) 52.6%; ▌William G. Troy (Democratic) 45.6%; ▌Edward W. Thienert (Socialist) 1.9%

== South Carolina ==
District	Incumbent			This race	
District	Member	Party	First elected	Results	Candidates
South Carolina 1	Richard S. Whaley	Democratic	1913 (special)	Incumbent re-elected.	▌ ✓ Richard S. Whaley (Democratic); Unopposed
South Carolina 2	James F. Byrnes	Democratic	1910	Incumbent re-elected.	▌ ✓ James F. Byrnes (Democratic); Unopposed
South Carolina 3	Frederick H. Dominick	Democratic	1916	Incumbent re-elected.	▌ ✓ Frederick H. Dominick (Democratic); Unopposed
South Carolina 4	Samuel J. Nicholls	Democratic	1915 (special)	Incumbent re-elected.	▌ ✓ Samuel J. Nicholls (Democratic); Unopposed
South Carolina 5	William F. Stevenson	Democratic	1916	Incumbent re-elected.	▌ ✓ William F. Stevenson (Democratic); Unopposed
South Carolina 6	J. Willard Ragsdale	Democratic	1912	Incumbent re-elected.	▌ ✓ J. Willard Ragsdale (Democratic); Unopposed
South Carolina 7	A. Frank Lever	Democratic	1901 (special)	Incumbent re-elected.	▌ ✓ A. Frank Lever (Democratic) 96.4%; ▌R. H. Richardson (Unknown) (Note: Richardson's designation is unknown, but he had run as a Republican for this district in 1908 and 1910.) 3.6%

== South Dakota ==
District	Incumbent			This race	
District	Member	Party	First elected	Results	Candidates
South Dakota 1	Charles H. Dillon	Republican	1912	Incumbent lost renomination. Republican hold.	▌ ✓ Charles A. Christopherson (Republican) 54.1%; ▌Robert E. Dowdell (Democratic) 41.5%; ▌J. D. Wipf (Independent) 3.4%; ▌C. F. Carlson (Independent) 0.9%
South Dakota 2	Royal C. Johnson	Republican	1914	Incumbent re-elected.	▌ ✓ Royal C. Johnson (Republican) 72.1%; ▌James W. McCarter (Democratic) 27.9%
South Dakota 3	Harry Gandy	Democratic	1914	Incumbent re-elected.	▌ ✓ Harry Gandy (Democratic) 50.7%; ▌Harry A. Atwater (Republican) 36.4%; ▌Harry A. Ayres (Independent) 11.8%; ▌J. E. Basford (Socialist) 1.2%

== Tennessee ==
District	Incumbent			This race	
District	Member	Party	First elected	Results	Candidates
Tennessee 1	Sam R. Sells	Republican	1910	Incumbent re-elected.	▌ ✓ Sam R. Sells (Republican); Unopposed
Tennessee 2	Richard W. Austin	Republican	1908	Incumbent lost renomination. Republican hold.	▌ ✓ J. Will Taylor (Republican) 74.0%; ▌H. Johnson (Democratic) 26.0%
Tennessee 3	John A. Moon	Democratic	1896	Incumbent re-elected.	▌ ✓ John A. Moon (Democratic); Unopposed
Tennessee 4	Cordell Hull	Democratic	1906	Incumbent re-elected.	▌ ✓ Cordell Hull (Democratic); Unopposed
Tennessee 5	William C. Houston	Democratic	1904	Incumbent retired. Democratic hold.	▌ ✓ Ewin L. Davis (Democratic); Unopposed
Tennessee 6	Jo Byrns	Democratic	1908	Incumbent re-elected.	▌ ✓ Jo Byrns (Democratic); Unopposed
Tennessee 7	Lemuel P. Padgett	Democratic	1900	Incumbent re-elected.	▌ ✓ Lemuel P. Padgett (Democratic); Unopposed
Tennessee 8	Thetus W. Sims	Democratic	1896	Incumbent re-elected.	▌ ✓ Thetus W. Sims (Democratic); Unopposed
Tennessee 9	Finis J. Garrett	Democratic	1904	Incumbent re-elected.	▌ ✓ Finis J. Garrett (Democratic); Unopposed
Tennessee 10	Hubert Fisher	Democratic	1916	Incumbent re-elected.	▌ ✓ Hubert Fisher (Democratic); Unopposed

== Texas ==
District	Incumbent			This race	
District	Member	Party	First elected	Results	Candidates
Texas 1	Eugene Black	Democratic	1914	Incumbent re-elected.	▌ ✓ Eugene Black (Democratic); Unopposed
Texas 2	Martin Dies Sr.	Democratic	1908	Incumbent retired. Democratic hold.	▌ ✓ John C. Box (Democratic); Unopposed
Texas 3	James Young	Democratic	1910	Incumbent re-elected.	▌ ✓ James Young (Democratic); Unopposed
Texas 4	Sam Rayburn	Democratic	1912	Incumbent re-elected.	▌ ✓ Sam Rayburn (Democratic); Unopposed
Texas 5	Hatton W. Sumners	Democratic	1912	Incumbent re-elected.	▌ ✓ Hatton W. Sumners (Democratic); Unopposed
Texas 6	Rufus Hardy	Democratic	1906	Incumbent re-elected.	▌ ✓ Rufus Hardy (Democratic) 87.8%; ▌Charles W. Beck (Republican) 12.2%
Texas 7	Alexander W. Gregg	Democratic	1902	Incumbent retired. Democratic hold.	▌ ✓ Clay Stone Briggs (Democratic); Unopposed
Texas 8	Joe H. Eagle	Democratic	1912	Incumbent re-elected.	▌ ✓ Joe H. Eagle (Democratic) 96.2%; ▌M. H. Broyles (Unknown) 3.8% (Note: Broyles was a leading Black Republican who stood for this district in 1920 as a Black and Tan Republican.)
Texas 8	Daniel E. Garrett; Redistricted from the at-large seat.	Democratic	1916	Incumbent retired. Democratic loss.	▌ ✓ Joe H. Eagle (Democratic) 96.2%; ▌M. H. Broyles (Unknown) 3.8%
Texas 8	A. Jeff McLemore; Redistricted from the at-large seat.	Democratic	1914	Incumbent lost renomination. Democratic loss.	▌ ✓ Joe H. Eagle (Democratic) 96.2%; ▌M. H. Broyles (Unknown) 3.8%
Texas 9	Joseph J. Mansfield	Democratic	1916	Incumbent re-elected.	▌ ✓ Joseph J. Mansfield (Democratic); Unopposed
Texas 10	James P. Buchanan	Democratic	1913 (Special)	Incumbent re-elected.	▌ ✓ James P. Buchanan (Democratic); Unopposed
Texas 11	Tom Connally	Democratic	1916	Incumbent re-elected.	▌ ✓ Tom Connally (Democratic); Unopposed
Texas 12	James Clifton Wilson	Democratic	1916	Incumbent re-elected.	▌ ✓ James Clifton Wilson (Democratic); Unopposed
Texas 13	None (new district)			New seat. Democratic gain.	▌ ✓ Lucian W. Parrish (Democratic); Unopposed
Texas 14	James L. Slayden	Democratic	1896	Incumbent retired. Democratic hold.	▌ ✓ Carlos Bee (Democratic) 68.4%; ▌John D. Hartman (Republican) 31.6%
Texas 15	John Nance Garner	Democratic	1902	Incumbent re-elected.	▌ ✓ John Nance Garner (Democratic); Unopposed
Texas 16	None (new district)			New seat. Democratic gain.	▌ ✓ Claude B. Hudspeth (Democratic); Unopposed
Texas 17	Thomas L. Blanton; Redistricted from the 16th district	Democratic	1916	Incumbent re-elected.	▌ ✓ Thomas L. Blanton (Democratic); Unopposed
Texas 18	John Marvin Jones; Redistricted from the 13th district	Democratic	1916	Incumbent re-elected.	▌ ✓ John Marvin Jones (Democratic) 95.3%; ▌Hugh E. Exum (Republican) 4.7%

== Utah ==
District	Incumbent			This race	
District	Member	Party	First elected	Results	Candidates
Utah 1	Milton H. Welling	Democratic	1916	Incumbent re-elected.	▌ ✓ Milton H. Welling (Democratic) 54.9%; ▌William H. Wattis (Republican) 44.4%; ▌Daniel N. Keef (Socialist) 0.8%
Utah 2	James Henry Mays	Democratic	1914	Incumbent re-elected.	▌ ✓ James Henry Mays (Democratic) 58.7%; ▌William Spry (Republican) 39.6%; ▌A. H. Kempton (Socialist) 1.8%

== Vermont ==
District	Incumbent			This race	
District	Member	Party	First elected	Results	Candidates
Vermont 1	Frank L. Greene	Republican	1912 (special)	Incumbent re-elected.	▌ ✓ Frank L. Greene (Republican) 75.8%; ▌John Higgins (Democratic) 24.1%
Vermont 2	Porter H. Dale	Republican	1914	Incumbent re-elected.	▌ ✓ Porter H. Dale (Republican) (Note: Endorsed by the Prohibition Party) 74.5%; ▌John B. Reardon (Democratic) 25.5%

== Virginia ==
District	Incumbent			This race	
District	Member	Party	First elected	Results	Candidates
Virginia 1	S. Otis Bland	Democratic	1918 (special)	Incumbent re-elected.	▌ ✓ S. Otis Bland (Democratic) 99.9%
Virginia 2	Edward E. Holland	Democratic	1910	Incumbent re-elected.	▌ ✓ Edward E. Holland (Democratic); Unopposed
Virginia 3	Andrew Jackson Montague	Democratic	1912	Incumbent re-elected.	▌ ✓ Andrew Jackson Montague (Democratic); Unopposed
Virginia 4	Walter A. Watson	Democratic	1912	Incumbent re-elected.	▌ ✓ Walter A. Watson (Democratic) 99.9%
Virginia 5	Edward W. Saunders	Democratic	1906	Incumbent re-elected.	▌ ✓ Edward W. Saunders (Democratic) 99.97%
Virginia 6	Carter Glass	Democratic	1902 (special)	Incumbent re-elected.	▌ ✓ Carter Glass (Democratic) 99.6%
Virginia 7	Thomas W. Harrison	Democratic	1916	Incumbent re-elected.	▌ ✓ Thomas W. Harrison (Democratic) 88.8%; ▌John Paul (Republican) 11.0%
Virginia 8	Charles C. Carlin	Democratic	1907 (special)	Incumbent re-elected.	▌ ✓ Charles C. Carlin (Democratic) 99.98%
Virginia 9	C. Bascom Slemp	Republican	1907 (special)	Incumbent re-elected.	▌ ✓ C. Bascom Slemp (Republican) 95.0%; ▌D. B. Dale (Democratic) 4.9%
Virginia 10	Henry D. Flood	Democratic	1900	Incumbent re-elected.	▌ ✓ Henry D. Flood (Democratic) 99.7%

== Washington ==
District	Incumbent			This race	
District	Member	Party	First elected	Results	Candidates
Washington 1	John Franklin Miller	Republican	1916	Incumbent re-elected.	▌ ✓ John Franklin Miller (Republican) 50.55%; ▌J. M. Hawthorne (Democratic) 44.40%; ▌Hulet M. Wells (Socialist) 5.06%
Washington 2	Lindley H. Hadley	Republican	1914	Incumbent re-elected.	▌ ✓ Lindley H. Hadley (Republican) 53.65%; ▌Joseph A. Sloan (Democratic) 40.81%; ▌James M. Salter (Socialist) 5.54%
Washington 3	Albert Johnson	Republican	1912	Incumbent re-elected.	▌ ✓ Albert Johnson (Republican) 66.57%; ▌Theodore Hoss (Democratic) 28.31%; ▌O. T. Clark (Socialist) 5.12%
Washington 4	William La Follette	Republican	1910	Incumbent lost renomination. Republican hold.	▌ ✓ John W. Summers (Republican) 55.26%; ▌William E. McCroskey (Democratic) 42.25%; ▌Walter Price (Socialist) 2.46%
Washington 5	Clarence Dill	Democratic	1914	Incumbent lost re-election. Republican gain.	▌ ✓ J. Stanley Webster (Republican) 52.20%; ▌Clarence Dill (Democratic) 46.70%; ▌Peter Harrison (Socialist) 1.10%

== West Virginia ==
District	Incumbent			This race	
District	Member	Party	First elected	Results	Candidates
West Virginia 1	Matthew M. Neely	Democratic	1913 (special)	Incumbent re-elected.	▌ ✓ Matthew M. Neely (Democratic) 52.8%; ▌Charles J. Schuck (Republican) 46.4%; ▌E. B. Hibbs (Socialist) 0.8%
West Virginia 2	George M. Bowers	Republican	1916 (special)	Incumbent re-elected.	▌ ✓ George M. Bowers (Republican) 52.7%; ▌Ben H. Hiner (Democratic) 46.0%; ▌E. E. Smith (Socialist) 1.3%
West Virginia 3	Stuart F. Reed	Republican	1916	Incumbent re-elected.	▌ ✓ Stuart F. Reed (Republican) 53.9%; ▌Ernest Randolph (Democratic) 45.1%; ▌P. R. Garrett (Socialist) 0.9%
West Virginia 4	Harry C. Woodyard	Republican	1916 (special)	Incumbent re-elected.	▌ ✓ Harry C. Woodyard (Republican) 55.3%; ▌Stuart H. Bowman (Democratic) 44.3%; ▌G. W. Gillispie (Socialist) 0.4%
West Virginia 5	Edward Cooper	Republican	1914	Incumbent lost renomination. Republican hold.	▌ ✓ Wells Goodykoontz (Republican) 54.1%; ▌W. H. McNeal (Democratic) 45.9%
West Virginia 6	Adam B. Littlepage	Democratic	1914	Incumbent lost re-election. Republican gain.	▌ ✓ Leonard S. Echols (Republican) 51.5%; ▌Adam B. Littlepage (Democratic) 46.8%; ▌P. H. Camp (Socialist) 1.7%

== Wisconsin ==
District	Incumbent			This race	
District	Member	Party	First elected	Results	Candidates
Wisconsin 1	Henry Allen Cooper	Republican	1892	Incumbent lost re-election as an independent. Republican hold.	▌ ✓ Clifford E. Randall (Republican) 42.3%; ▌Henry Allen Cooper (Independent) 28.9%; ▌Calvin Stewart (Democratic) 24.8%; ▌Samuel S. Walkup (Social-Democratic) 4.0%
Wisconsin 2	Edward Voigt	Republican	1916	Incumbent re-elected.	▌ ✓ Edward Voigt (Republican) 44.0%; ▌John Clifford (Democratic) 36.0%; ▌Oscar Ameringer (Social-Democratic) 20.0%
Wisconsin 3	John M. Nelson	Republican	1906 (special)	Incumbent lost renomination. Republican hold.	▌ ✓ James G. Monahan (Republican) 73.4%; ▌Ernest N. Warner (Independent) 17.5%; ▌Edward J. Reynolds (Ind. Democratic) 8.9%
Wisconsin 4	William J. Cary	Republican	1906	Incumbent lost renomination. Republican hold.	▌ ✓ John C. Kleczka (Republican) 58.1%; ▌Edmund Melms (Social-Democratic) 41.8%
Wisconsin 5	William H. Stafford	Republican	1912	Incumbent lost re-election. Social-Democratic gain.	▌ ✓ Victor L. Berger (Social-Democratic) 43.7%; ▌Joseph P. Carney (Democratic) 30.3%; ▌William H. Stafford (Republican) 26.0%
Wisconsin 6	James H. Davidson	Republican	1916	Incumbent died August 6, 1918; Republican hold.	▌ ✓ Florian Lampert (Republican) 41.5%; ▌Bondeul A. Husting (Democratic) 35.4%; ▌G. H. Thompson (Social-Democratic) 22.0%; ▌Byron E. Van Keuren (Prohibition) 1.0%
Wisconsin 7	John J. Esch	Republican	1898	Incumbent re-elected.	▌ ✓ John J. Esch (Republican) 70.9%; ▌Arthur A. Bentley (Democratic) 26.8%; ▌Oliver Needham (Prohibition) 2.2%
Wisconsin 8	Edward E. Browne	Republican	1912	Incumbent re-elected.	▌ ✓ Edward E. Browne (Republican) 51.8%; ▌John W. Brown (Democratic) 25.9%; ▌Leo Krzycki (Social-Democratic) 22.3%
Wisconsin 9	David G. Classon	Republican	1916	Incumbent re-elected.	▌ ✓ David G. Classon (Republican) 60.4%; ▌A. R. McDonald (Democratic) 39.5%
Wisconsin 10	James A. Frear	Republican	1912	Incumbent re-elected.	▌ ✓ James A. Frear (Republican) 90.2%; ▌William H. Frawley (Independent) 9.7%
Wisconsin 11	Irvine Lenroot	Republican	1908	Incumbent resigned when elected U.S. Senator. Republican hold.	▌ ✓ Adolphus Peter Nelson (Republican) 84.3%; ▌John P. Jensen (Social-Democratic) 15.3%

== Wyoming ==
District	Incumbent			This race	
District	Member	Party	First elected	Results	Candidates
Wyoming at-large	Frank W. Mondell	Republican	1898	Incumbent re-elected.	▌ ✓ Frank W. Mondell (Republican) 64.2%; ▌Hayden M. White (Democratic) 35.8%

== Non-voting delegates ==
=== Alaska Territory ===
District	Incumbent			This race	
District	Representative	Party	First elected	Results	Candidates
Alaska Territory at-large	James Wickersham	Republican	1908; 1916 (lost); 1919 (won contest)	Incumbent lost re-election. Democratic gain.	▌ ✓ Charles A. Sulzer (Democratic) 48.35%; ▌James Wickersham (Republican) 48.00%

As he had successfully done the previous time, Wickersham again contested the election. During the contest, Sulzer died April 28, 1919, and Democrat George Barnes Grigsby won the June 5 special election to finish the term. Wickersham then won the election contest and was seated March 1, 1921.

== See also ==
- 1918 United States elections
  - 1918 United States Senate elections
- 65th United States Congress
- 66th United States Congress

== Bibliography ==
- Langland, James, ed. (1920). The Chicago Daily News Almanac and Yearbook for 1920. Chicago, IL: The Chicago Daily News.
- Dubin, Michael J. (March 1, 1998). United States Congressional Elections, 1788-1997: The Official Results of the Elections of the 1st Through 105th Congresses. McFarland and Company. ISBN 978-0786402830.
- Martis, Kenneth C. (January 1, 1989). The Historical Atlas of Political Parties in the United States Congress, 1789-1989. Macmillan Publishing Company. ISBN 978-0029201701.
- Moore, John L., ed. (1994). Congressional Quarterly's Guide to U.S. Elections (Third ed.). Congressional Quarterly Inc. ISBN 978-0871879967.
- "Party Divisions of the House of Representatives* 1789–Present". Office of the Historian, House of United States House of Representatives.
