= 1913 United States House of Representatives elections =

There were twelve special elections to the United States House of Representatives in 1913, during the 62nd United States Congress and 63rd United States Congress.

== 62nd United States Congress ==
District	Incumbent			This race	
District	Member	Party	First elected	Results	Candidates
Arkansas 6	Joseph T. Robinson	Democratic	1902	Incumbent resigned January 14, 1913 to become Governor of Arkansas. New member elected January 15, 1913, having already been elected to the next term. Democratic hold.	▌ ✓ Samuel M. Taylor (Democratic); [data missing]

== 63rd United States Congress ==
District	Incumbent			This race	
District	Member	Party	First elected	Results	Candidates
Massachusetts 13	John W. Weeks	Republican	1902	Incumbent resigned March 4, 1913, when elected U.S. Senator. New member elected April 15, 1913. Democratic gain.	▌ ✓ John J. Mitchell (Democratic); [data missing]
Texas 10	Albert S. Burleson	Democratic	1898	Incumbent resigned March 6, 1913 to become U.S. Postmaster General. New member elected April 15, 1913. Democratic hold.	▌ ✓ James P. Buchanan (Democratic); [data missing]
South Carolina 1	George S. Legaré	Democratic	1902	Incumbent member-elect died January 31, 1913. New member elected April 29, 1913. Democratic hold.	▌ ✓ Richard S. Whaley (Democratic); Unopposed
New Jersey 6	Lewis J. Martin	Democratic	1912	Incumbent died May 5, 1913. New member elected July 22, 1913. Democratic hold.	▌ ✓ Archibald C. Hart (Democratic); [data missing]
Maine 3	Forrest Goodwin	Republican	1912	Incumbent died May 28, 1913. New member elected September 9, 1913. Republican hold.	▌ ✓ John A. Peters (Republican); [data missing]
West Virginia 1	John W. Davis	Democratic	1910	Incumbent resigned August 29, 1913 to become U.S. Solicitor General. New member elected October 14, 1913. Democratic hold.	▌ ✓ Matthew M. Neely (Democratic) 42.93%; ▌Julian G. Hearne (Republican) 33.64%; ▌George A. Laughlin (Progressive) 11.32%; ▌Walter B. Hilton (Socialist) 6.29%; ▌John H. Holt (Prohibition) 5.82%
Georgia 2	Seaborn Roddenbery	Democratic	1910 (special)	Incumbent died September 25, 1913. New member elected November 4, 1913. Democratic hold.	▌ ✓ Frank Park (Democratic); [data missing]
Maryland 3	George Konig	Democratic	1910	Incumbent died May 31, 1913. New member elected November 4, 1913. Democratic hold.	▌ ✓ Charles P. Coady (Democratic); [data missing]
Massachusetts 3	William Wilder	Republican	1910	Incumbent died September 11, 1913. New member elected November 4, 1913. Republican hold.	▌ ✓ Calvin Paige (Republican); [data missing]
New York 13	Timothy Sullivan	Democratic	1902; 1903 (resigned); 1912	Incumbent died August 31, 1913. New member elected November 4, 1913. Democratic hold.	▌ ✓ George W. Loft (Democratic); [data missing]
New York 20	Francis B. Harrison	Democratic	1902; 1904 (retired); 1906	Incumbent resigned September 1, 1913 to become Governor-General of the Philippines. New member elected November 4, 1913. Democratic hold.	▌ ✓ Jacob A. Cantor (Democratic); [data missing]

== See also ==
- 1912–13 United States Senate elections
