= 1912 United States House of Representatives election in Arizona =

1912 United States House of Representatives elections in Arizona
- November 5, 1912
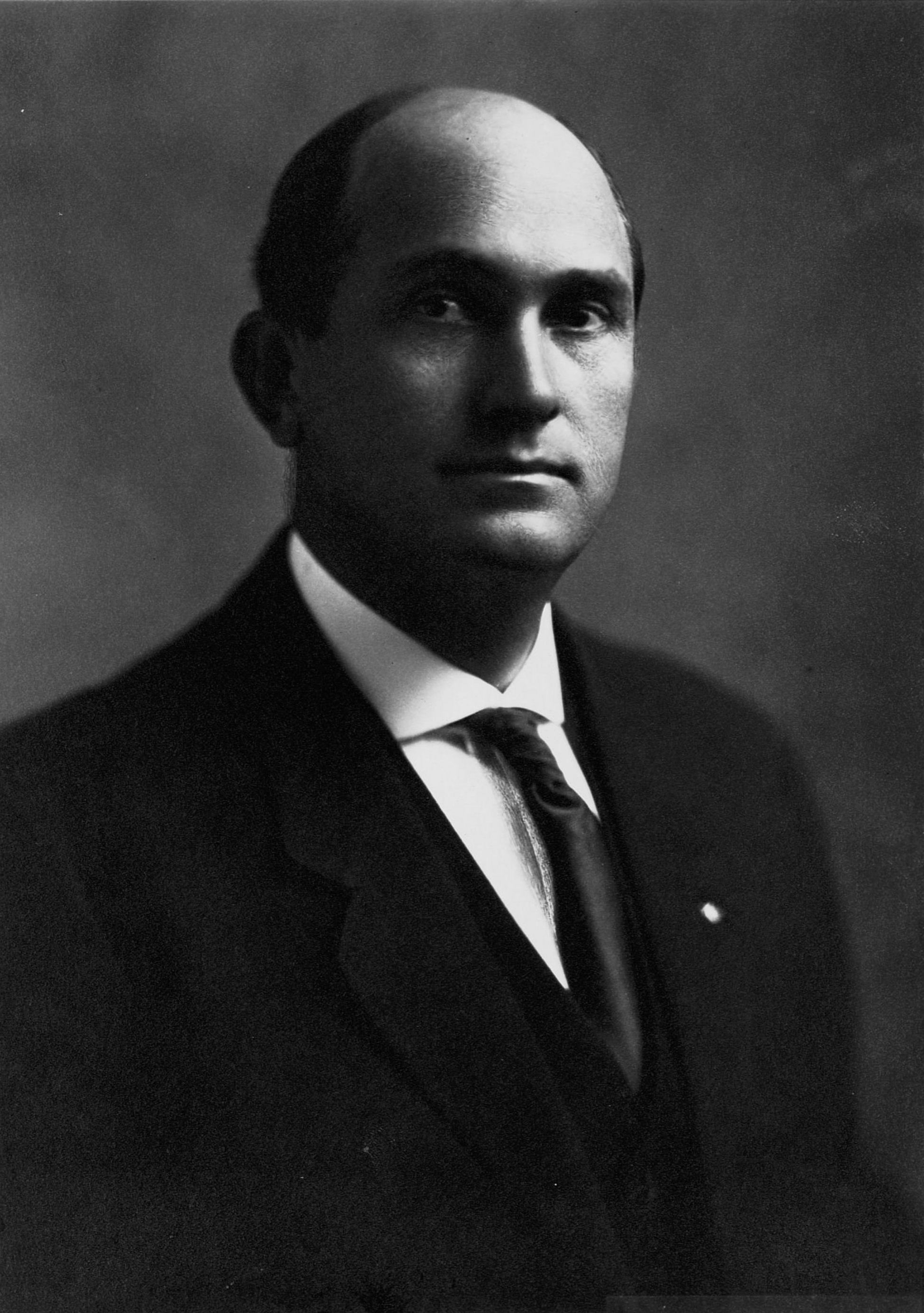

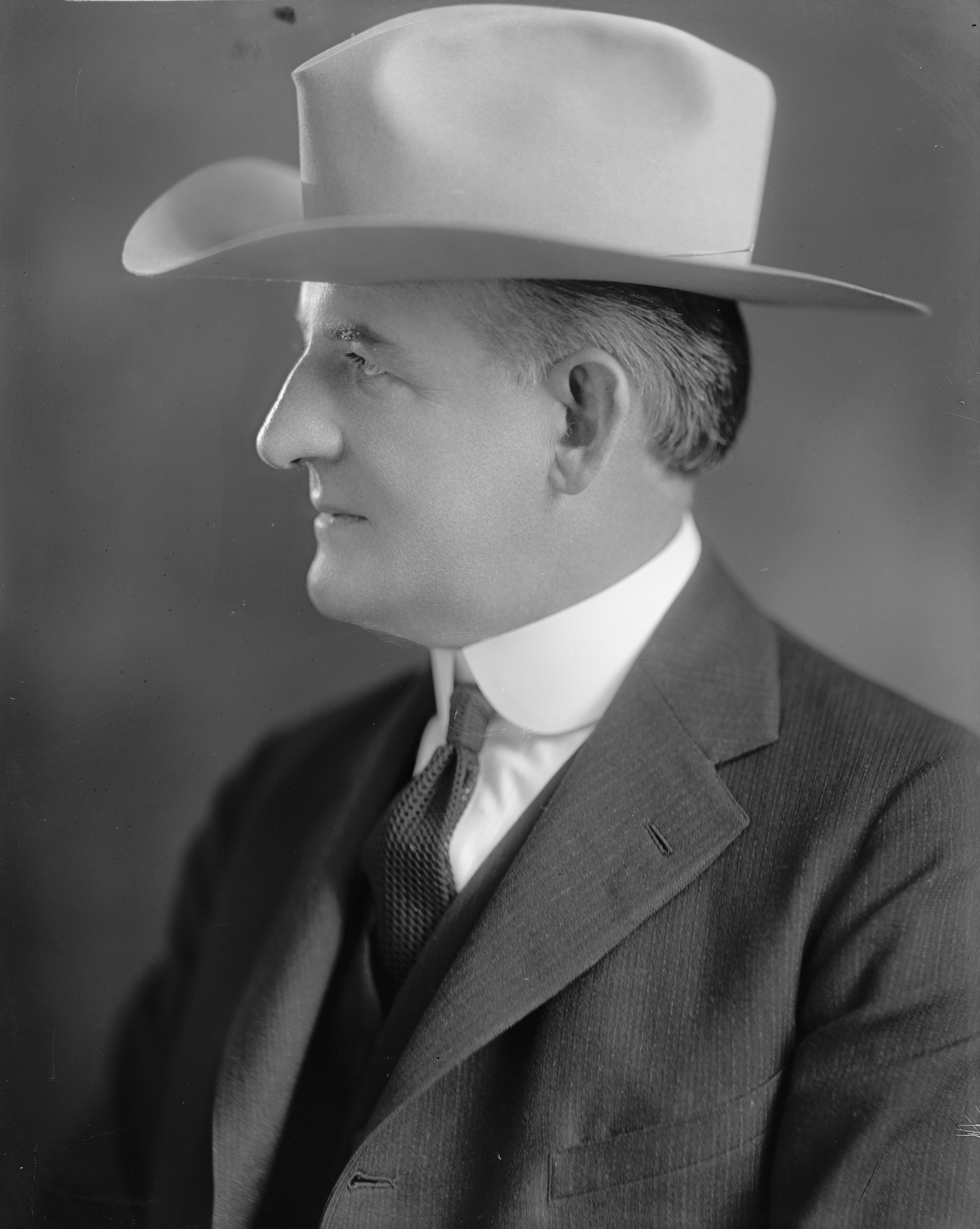

Nominee	Carl Hayden	Robert S. Fisher
Party	Democratic	Progressive
Popular vote	11,389	5,819
Percentage	48.37%	24.71%
Nominee	Thomas E. Campbell	A. Charles Smith
Party	Republican	Socialist
Popular vote	3,110	3,034
Percentage	13.21%	12.89%
- County results Hayden: 40–50% 50–60%
Representative
At-large before election
Carl Hayden
Democratic
Elected Representative
At-large
Carl Hayden
Democratic

The 1912 United States House of Representatives elections in Arizona was held on Tuesday November 5, 1912 to elect the state's sole at-large representative. incumbent democrat, Carl Hayden won re-election with 48% of the vote.

Primary elections were held on September 10, 1912.

== Democratic primary ==
Democratic primary results
Party	Candidate	Votes	%
Democratic	Carl Hayden	3,614	100.0%
Total votes		3,614	100.00

== General Election ==
Arizona At-large congressional district election, 1912
Party	Candidate	Votes	%
Democratic	Carl Hayden	11,389	48.37%
Progressive	Robert S. Fisher	5,819	24.71%
Republican	Thomas Edward Campbell	3,110	13.21%
Socialist	A. Charles Smith	3,034	12.89%
Total votes		21,381	100.00
