= Clay Street Bridge =

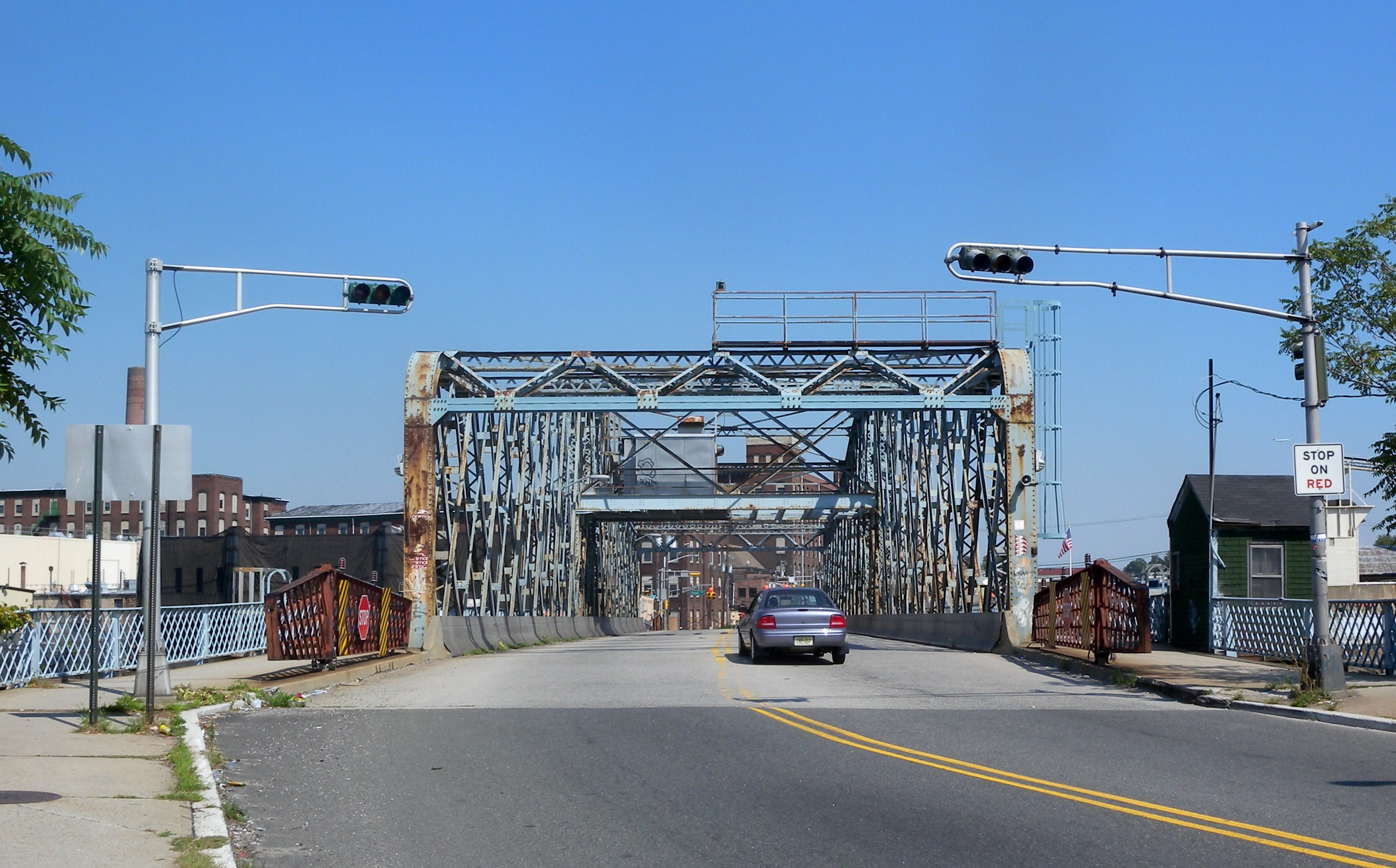
- Coordinates: 40°45′03″N 74°09′56″W
- Carries: Clay Street & Central Avenue
- Crosses: Passaic River
- Locale: Newark and East Newark; Northeastern New Jersey
- Owner: Essex County
- ID number: NJ0700H01

Characteristics
- Design: Swing bridge
- Material: Steel
- Total length: 328.1 feet (100.0 m)
- Width: 39.4 feet (12.0 m)
- Longest span: 118.19 feet (36.02 m)
- No. of spans: 3
- Clearance above: 16.7 feet (5.1 m)
- Clearance below: 6.9 feet (2.1 m) (low tide)

History
- Engineering design by: J. Owen
- Constructed by: A.E. Sanford Company
- Opened: 1908

Location
- Interactive map of Clay Street Bridge

The Clay Street Bridge is a bridge on the Passaic River between Newark and East Newark, New Jersey. The swing bridge is the 13th bridge from the river's mouth at Newark Bay and is 6.1 miles (9.8 km) upstream from it. Opened in 1903, the Warren through truss rim-bearing bridge was substantially rehabilitated in 1975–1976, its original working parts are now part of the collection of the Newark Museum. It is listed on the New Jersey Register of Historic Places (ID#5153) and is eligible for the National Register of Historic Places.

The lower 17 miles (27 km) of the 90-mile (140 km) long Passaic River downstream of the Dundee Dam is tidally influenced and navigable. The Clay Street Bridge was built to replace an 1889 wrought iron structure. It is one of three functional vehicular and pedestrian swing bridges in the city, the others being the Jackson Street Bridge and the Bridge Street Bridge. Since 1998, rules regulating drawbridge operations require a four-hour notice for them to be opened, which occurs infrequently.

At its eastern end Clay Street Bridge enters the Clark Thread Company Historic District, crossing the river at a point which remains in use for industry, manufacturing, and distribution. The western end enters the neighborhood of Newark sometimes known as Lower Broadway. The US Army Corps of Engineers is undertaking restoration and rehabilitation of the Lower Passaic, including oversight of environmental remediation and reconstruction of bulkheads.

In 2012, the New Jersey Department of Transportation allocated funds for the reconstruction of the bridge. As of 2014 the North Jersey Transportation Planning Authority in conjunction with the counties, is conducting Local Concept Development (LCD) Study, an earlier phase in addressing the deterioration and structural deficiencies of the bridge, which due to its age, can no longer address with routine maintenance. In 2015, it was determined that a replacement is the preferred option, which would cost approximately $70 million.

== See also ==
- List of crossings of the Lower Passaic River
- List of bridges, tunnels, and cuts in Hudson County, New Jersey
