= Holy Sepulchre Cemetery (East Orange, New Jersey) =

Cemetery in East Orange, New Jersey

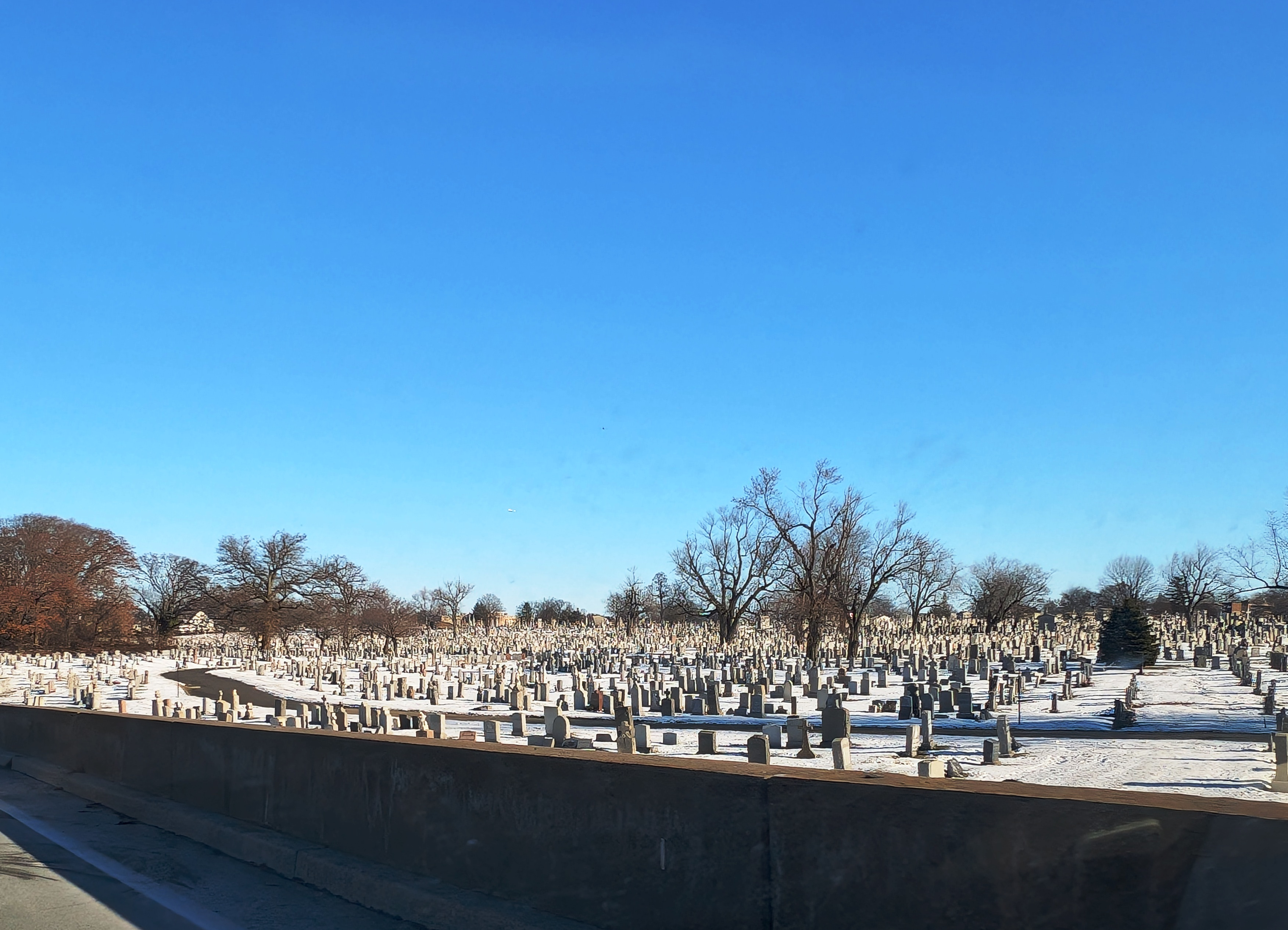
- Interactive map of Holy Sepulchre Cemetery

Details
- Established: 1859
- Location: East Orange, New Jersey; Newark, New Jersey
- Country: United States
- Coordinates: 40°45′02″N 74°12′31″W
- Type: Catholic
- Owned by: Roman Catholic Archdiocese of Newark
- No. of graves: 266,921 in 2002
- Website: Holy Sepulchre Cemetery
- Find a Grave: Holy Sepulchre Cemetery

Holy Sepulchre Cemetery is located in East Orange and Newark, New Jersey. The Garden State Parkway runs through the two halves of the cemetery (exit 144 and exit 145, respectively). The cemetery was established in 1859 and is maintained by the Roman Catholic Archdiocese of Newark.

Contrary to popular belief, when the Parkway was constructed in the 1950s, not a single grave was relocated by its construction. Only later was the land west of the Parkway added. Basically, the Parkway ran in the bed of the old Oraton Parkway. Multiple articles mistakenly share that hundreds of graves had to be moved prior to construction. Both sides of the cemetery are visible to drivers on the Parkway today.

== Notable burials ==
- Thomas J. Callan (1853–1908), Indian Wars Medal of Honor recipient
- Jack Farrell (1857–1914), Major League Baseball player for 11 seasons, from 1879 to 1889
- Edward F. McDonald (1844–1892), represented New Jersey's 7th congressional district from 1895 to 1899
- Cornelius Augustine McGlennon (1878–1931), represented New Jersey's 8th congressional district from 1919 to 1921
- Frank Joseph McNulty (1872–1926), Representative from New Jersey 8th District from 1923 to 1925
- Paul John Moore (1868–1938), represented New Jersey's 8th congressional district from 1927 to 1929
- Edward L. O'Neill (1903–1948), represented New Jersey's 11th congressional district from 1937 to 1939
- Albert Oss (1818–1898), Civil War Medal of Honor recipient
- James Smith, Jr. (1851–1927), U.S. Senator from New Jersey from 1893 to 1899
- Thomas Sullivan (1859–1940), Indian Wars Medal of Honor recipient
