= Frank McNulty =

Frank McNulty may refer to:

- Frank Joseph McNulty (1872–1926), one-term Democratic U.S. Representative from New Jersey
- Frank McNulty (Colorado politician), Republican member of the University of Colorado Board of Regents
