= Cornelius Augustine McGlennon =

American politician (1878–1931)

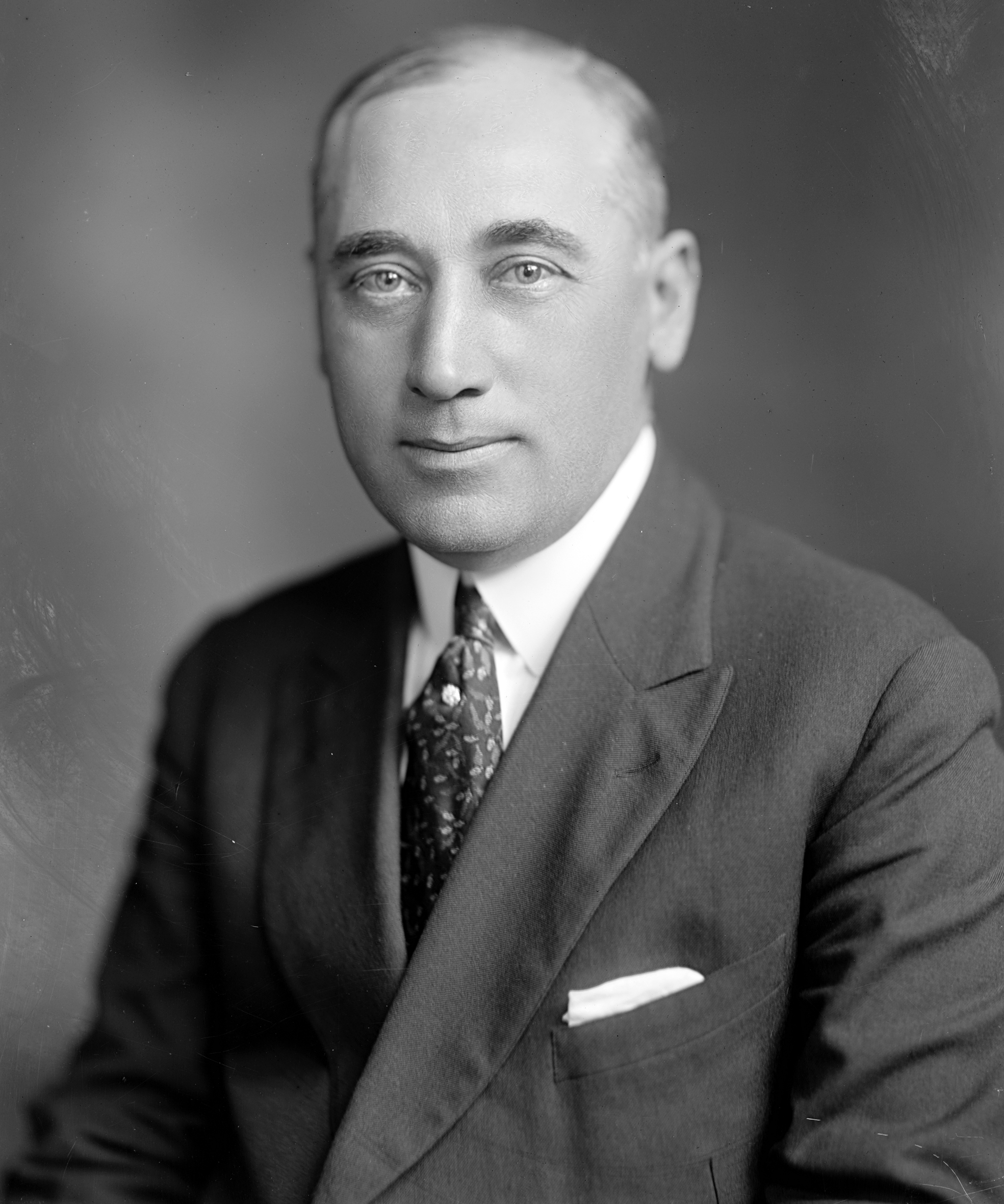
- Harris & Ewing Collection, Library of Congress

Member of the U.S. House of Representatives from New Jersey's 8th district
- In office March 4, 1919 – March 3, 1921
- Preceded by: Edward W. Gray
- Succeeded by: Herbert W. Taylor

Personal details
- Born: December 10, 1878 East Newark, New Jersey
- Died: June 13, 1931 (aged 52) Newark, New Jersey
- Party: Democratic

Cornelius Augustine McGlennon (December 10, 1878 – June 13, 1931) was an American Democratic Party politician who represented New Jersey's 8th congressional district from 1919 to 1921.

== Biography ==
McGlennon was born in East Newark, New Jersey, on December 10, 1878. Throughout his younger years he attended Holy Cross School in Harrison, New Jersey, and St. Francis Xavier's High School in Manhattan, New York City.

McGlennon later attended college and graduated from Seton Hall College in South Orange, New Jersey, in 1899. After this, he became a public and high-school principal from 1901 until 1926. Cornelius also studied law at the New Jersey Law School in Newark, New Jersey, before he was admitted to the bar in 1916. McGlennon practiced law in East Newark, New Jersey. Sometime afterwards, McGlennon's interest piqued in politics. McGlennon served as member of the New Jersey Senate in 1917 and 1918, and then served as Democratic floor leader in 1918. McGlennon also continued his political foray to be Mayor of East Newark, New Jersey, from 1907 to 1919.

In 1918, Democrat McGlennon, then majority leader of the state senate, defeated Republican William Ross by just 299 votes out of more than 25,000 cast. McGlennon was then the elected representative to the 66th United States Congress (March 4, 1919 – March 3, 1921), representing New Jersey's 8th congressional district in the United States House of Representatives, but was an unsuccessful candidate for reelection in 1920 to the 67th United States Congress. He served as a delegate to the 1920 Democratic National Convention. In 1924, he was appointed judge of the New Jersey Court of Errors and Appeals and served until his death. Cornelius also was acting supervising principal at Harrison, New Jersey, from 1926 to 1931.

He died in Newark, New Jersey, on June 13, 1931, at the age of 52. McGlennon was buried in Holy Sepulchre Cemetery in East Orange, New Jersey.

U.S. House of Representatives
Preceded by Edward W. Gray	U.S. Representative New Jersey 8th district March 4, 1919 – March 3, 1921	Succeeded by Herbert W. Taylor
