= Fred A. Hartley Jr. =

American politician

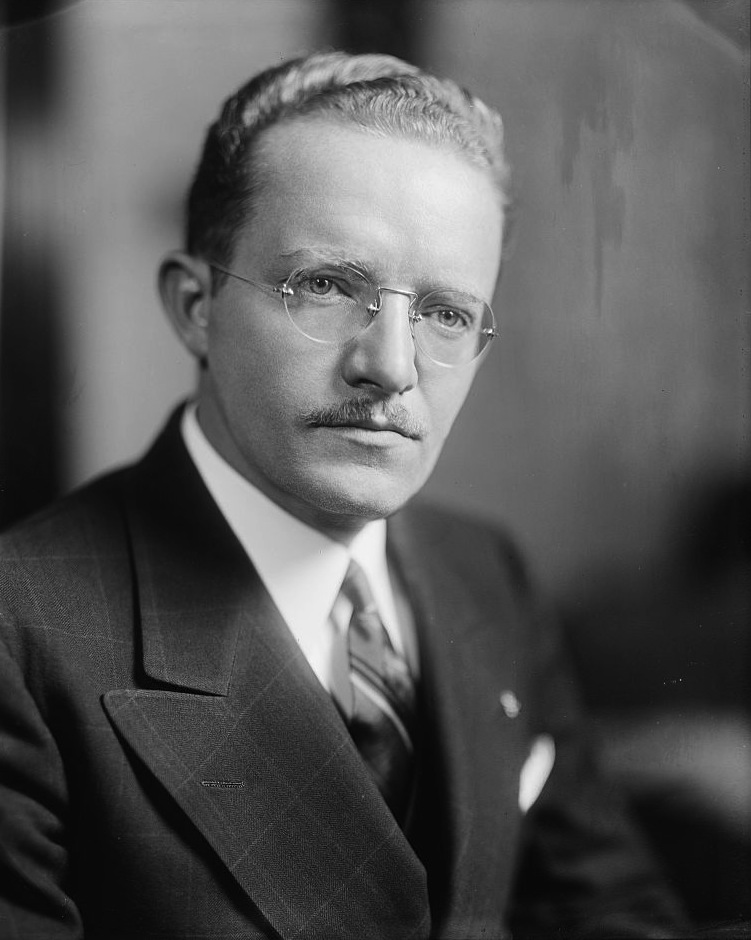
- Hartley between 1929 and 1949

Member of the U.S. House of Representatives from New Jersey
- In office March 4, 1929 – January 3, 1949
- Preceded by: Paul J. Moore
- Succeeded by: Peter W. Rodino
- Constituency: 8th district (1929–1933); 10th district (1933–1949)
House positions
Chair of the House Committee on Education and Labor
In office 1947 – January 3, 1949
Succeeded by	John Lesinski
Ranking Member of the House Committee on Patents
In office 1937 – January 3, 1947
Preceded by	Randolph Perkins
Ranking Member of the House Committee on Post Office and Post Roads
In office 1937 – January 3, 1947
Preceded by	Charles E. Dietrich
Ranking Member of the House Committee on Irrigation and Reclamation
In office 1935 – January 3, 1941
Preceded by	Vincent Carter
Succeeded by	Dewey Jackson Short

Personal details
- Born: Frederick Allan Hartley Jr. February 22, 1902 Harrison, New Jersey, U.S.
- Died: May 11, 1969 (aged 67) Linwood, New Jersey, U.S.
- Resting place: Fairmount Cemetery (Newark, New Jersey)
- Party: Republican
- Spouse: Hazel Lorraine Roemer
- Children: 3, including Al
- Education: Rutgers Preparatory School
- Alma mater: Rutgers University

Frederick Allan Hartley Jr. (February 22, 1902 – May 11, 1969) was an American politician from New Jersey. A member of the Republican Party, Hartley served ten terms in the United States House of Representatives where he represented the New Jersey's 8th and New Jersey's 10th congressional districts. He is best known for being the House of Representatives sponsor of the Taft–Hartley Act.

== Background ==
Hartley was born in Harrison, New Jersey, on February 22, 1902. After going through the Harrison public schools and Rutgers Preparatory School for high school, Hartley went on to attend Rutgers University. Following his studies in 1923, he successfully ran for the position of library commissioner for Kearny, New Jersey. After holding that position for two years, Hartley was named as the police and fire commissioner for Kearny, a position he held until 1928. In that same year, he was nominated as a Republican to run for the United States House of Representatives seat for New Jersey's 8th congressional district. Hartley defeated the incumbent Paul J. Moore in a close election on November 6, 1928. The final vote count in the election was 64,915 votes for Hartley and 64,594 for Moore, making the margin of defeat a slim 0.2%.

== Politics ==
Hartley was sworn in at age twenty-seven as the youngest member of the 71st United States Congress on March 4, 1929. Hartley was again challenged by Paul J. Moore in the 1930 House elections for the seat in New Jersey's 8th district. In another close race, Hartley beat out Moore, capturing 44,038 votes, or 50.4% of the vote, in comparison to 43,195 votes (or 49.4%) of the vote for Moore.

He was one of a relatively small number of Republicans to hold their seats throughout the Great Depression and World War II. In the 1932 election, he defeated William W. Harrison for the House seat in New Jersey's 10th congressional district. and in the 1934 he beat William Herda Smith. Hartley had another close race in 1936, in which he beat out Democratic challenger Lindsay H. Rudd in a close 50.2%-49.6% race. Hartley soundly defeated Rudd again in 1938, and won re-election in 1940 against William W. Holmwood, in 1942 against Frederic Bigelow, in 1944 against Luke A. Kiernan Jr., and in 1946 against his future successor Peter W. Rodino Jr.

=== Taft–Hartley ===
Hartley found the level of postwar labor unrest to be very disturbing, and felt that it threatened both economic and political stability. In 1946, the Republicans returned their first majority in both houses of Congress since the 1928 election in which Hartley was first elected.

With his party in the majority, Hartley served as the chairman of the Committee on Education and Labor in the 80th United States Congress. Along with Senator Robert A. Taft who was chairman of the Labor and Public Welfare Committee, the next year he introduced legislation to curb what he felt were the worst of labor's excesses. The resultant Taft–Hartley Act was a major revision of the 1935 Wagner Act (officially known as the National Labor Relations Act) and represented the first major revision of a New Deal act passed by the post-war Congress. The act placed limits on labor tactics such as the secondary boycott, and gave each state the option to enact right-to-work laws if it so chose (28 states have done so). This provision, known as Section 14(b), was one of the act's most controversial.

President Harry S. Truman vetoed the act, but Congress overrode the veto on June 23, 1947, with 20 of the 45 Democratic senators and 107 of the 188 Democratic representatives joining with Republicans to override the veto. It is in the platform of all major U.S. labor unions to call for the repeal of the act, especially Section 14 (b), and at times this has been reflected in the platform of the Democratic Party. However, the only time this has ever seemed likely was when the Democrats had a huge majority in both houses of Congress following the Republican electoral disaster of 1964. Even then, the repeal bill passed 221–203 in the House, but the two-thirds majority it needed in the Senate was never attained, partly because of long filibustering by Republicans such as Senate Minority Leader Everett Dirksen. Labor allies failed to break the filibuster, and the repeal bill was withdrawn by the Democratic Majority Leader, Mike Mansfield, in 1966.

Hartley did not seek any further election to Congress following the term in which the act which bears his name was passed, and his service concluded on January 3, 1949.

== Later life ==
Hartley ran unsuccessfully for one of the two New Jersey senatorial seats in 1954 and he returned to New Jersey and lived for fifteen more years as a business consultant, seeing the act withstand its toughest test and remain intact.

He died in Linwood, New Jersey, and was buried in Fairmount Cemetery, in Newark. His son, Al Hartley, was a cartoonist best known for his work on Archie Comics.

== Electoral history ==
=== United States Senate ===
United States Senate elections, 1954
Party	Candidate	Votes	%
Republican	Clifford Case (Incumbent)	861,528	48.66
Democratic	Charles R. Howell	858,158	48.47
American Third	Henry Krajewski	35,421	2.00
Write-In	Fred A. Hartley	7,025	0.40
Socialist Labor	Albert Ronis	4,832	0.27
Socialist Workers	George Breitman	3,590	0.20
Majority		3,370	0.19
Turnout		1,770,554	
Republican hold			

=== United States House of Representatives ===
United States House of Representatives elections, 1930
Party	Candidate	Votes	%
Republican	Fred A. Hartley Jr. (incumbent)	44,038	50.39
Democratic	Paul J. Moore	43,195	49.43
Communist	Albert Heder	159	0.18
Total votes		87,392	100

=== United States House of Representatives Primaries ===
May 15th, 1928 Republican Primary Results
Candidate	Votes	%
Fred A. Hartley Jr.	11,438	36.27
John DeGraw	10,942	34.69
Aaron A. Melniker	9,158	29.04
Total votes	31,538	100

U.S. House of Representatives
Preceded by Paul J. Moore	Member of the U.S. House of Representatives from New Jersey's 8th congressional district 1929–1933	Succeeded by George N. Seger
Preceded by Frederick R. Lehlbach	Member of the U.S. House of Representatives from New Jersey's 10th congressional district 1933–1949	Succeeded by Peter W. Rodino
