= Edward W. Gray =

American politician (1870–1942)

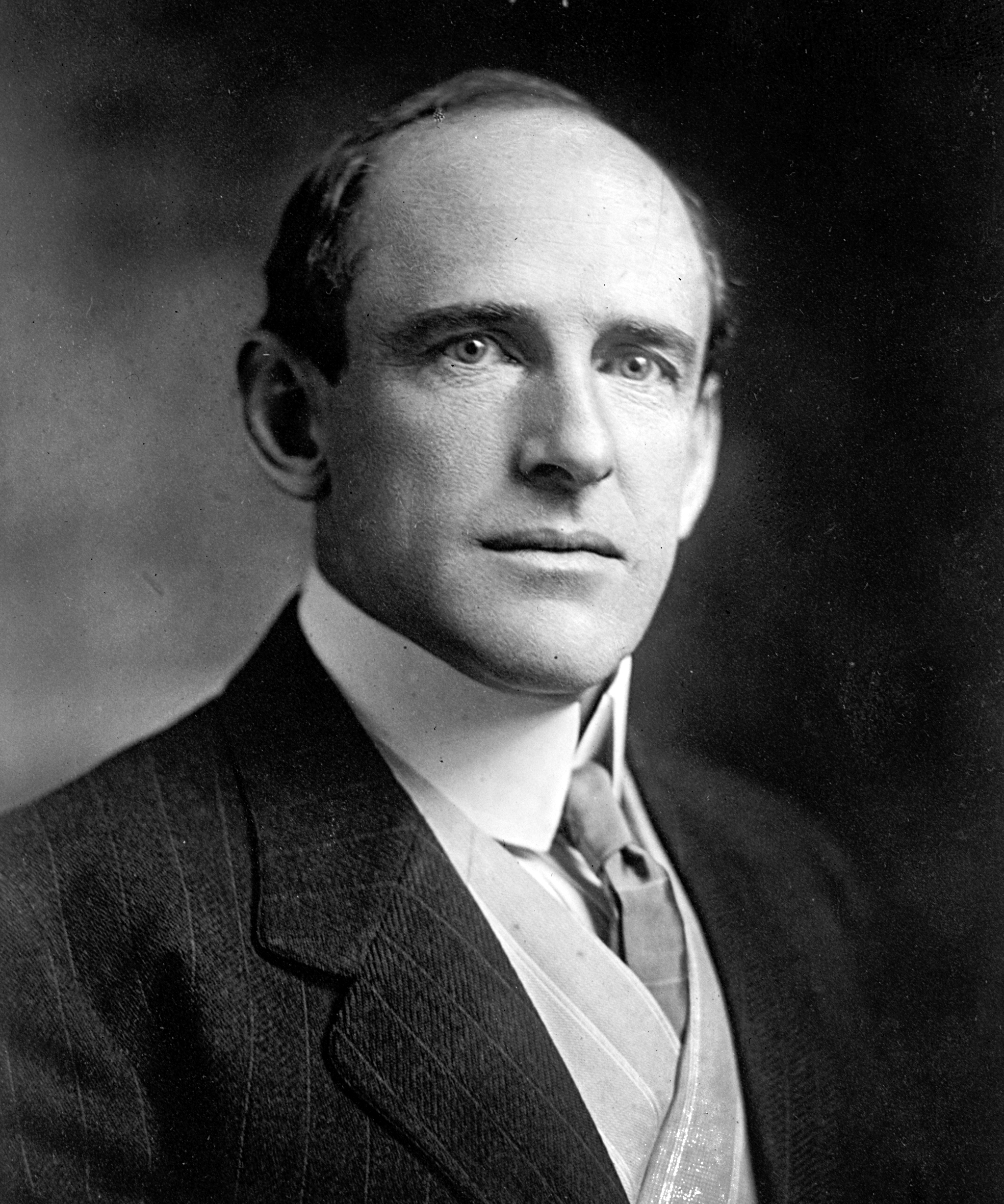

Member of the U.S. House of Representatives from New Jersey's 8th district
- In office March 4, 1915 – March 3, 1919
- Preceded by: Eugene F. Kinkead
- Succeeded by: Cornelius Augustine McGlennon

Personal details
- Born: August 18, 1870 Jersey City, New Jersey, US
- Died: June 10, 1942 (aged 71) Newark, New Jersey, US
- Resting place: Mount Pleasant Cemetery
- Party: Republican
- Spouse: Altha Reynolds Hay
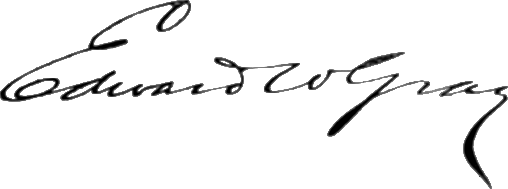
- Signature

Edward Winthrop Gray (August 18, 1870 – June 10, 1942) was an American Republican Party politician who represented New Jersey's 8th congressional district in the United States House of Representatives for two terms from 1915 to 1919. As of 2024, he was the last Republican to hold the district.

== Early life and career ==
Edward Gray was born in Jersey City, New Jersey on August 18, 1870, where he attended the public schools. He married Altha Reynolds Hay, and they had three children.

He was a newspaper reporter in New York City from 1894 to 1896. He was owner and publisher of the Summit Herald in 1897 and 1898, city editor and managing editor of the Newark Daily Advertiser from 1898 to 1902, and was president and general manager of the Newark Daily Advertising Publishing Co. from 1902 to 1904.

== Political career ==
Gray was appointed by Governor Franklin Murphy a commissioner to investigate tenement-house conditions in 1902 and was a member of the board of tenement-house supervision from 1900 to 1908. Gray was secretary to Gov. Edward C. Stokes from 1904 to 1907, and was secretary of the Republican State committee from 1908 to 1913. He organized the Commercial Casualty Insurance Company in Newark in 1909.

=== Congress ===
Gray was elected as a Republican to the Sixty-fourth and Sixty-fifth Congresses, serving in office from March 4, 1915 to March 3, 1919. He was an unsuccessful candidate for election in 1918 to the United States Senate, and was an unsuccessful candidate for nomination for Representative in 1924 and for Senator in 1928.

== Later career and death ==
After he left Congress, Gray was a writer, publisher, and lecturer. He died in Newark on June 10, 1942, and was interred there in Mount Pleasant Cemetery.

U.S. House of Representatives
Preceded by Eugene Francis Kinkead	Member of the U.S. House of Representatives from New Jersey's 6th congressional district March 4, 1915 – March 3, 1919	Succeeded by Cornelius Augustine McGlennon
