= Charles N. Fowler House =

Historic house in New Jersey, United States

- U.S. National Register of Historic Places
- New Jersey Register of Historic Places
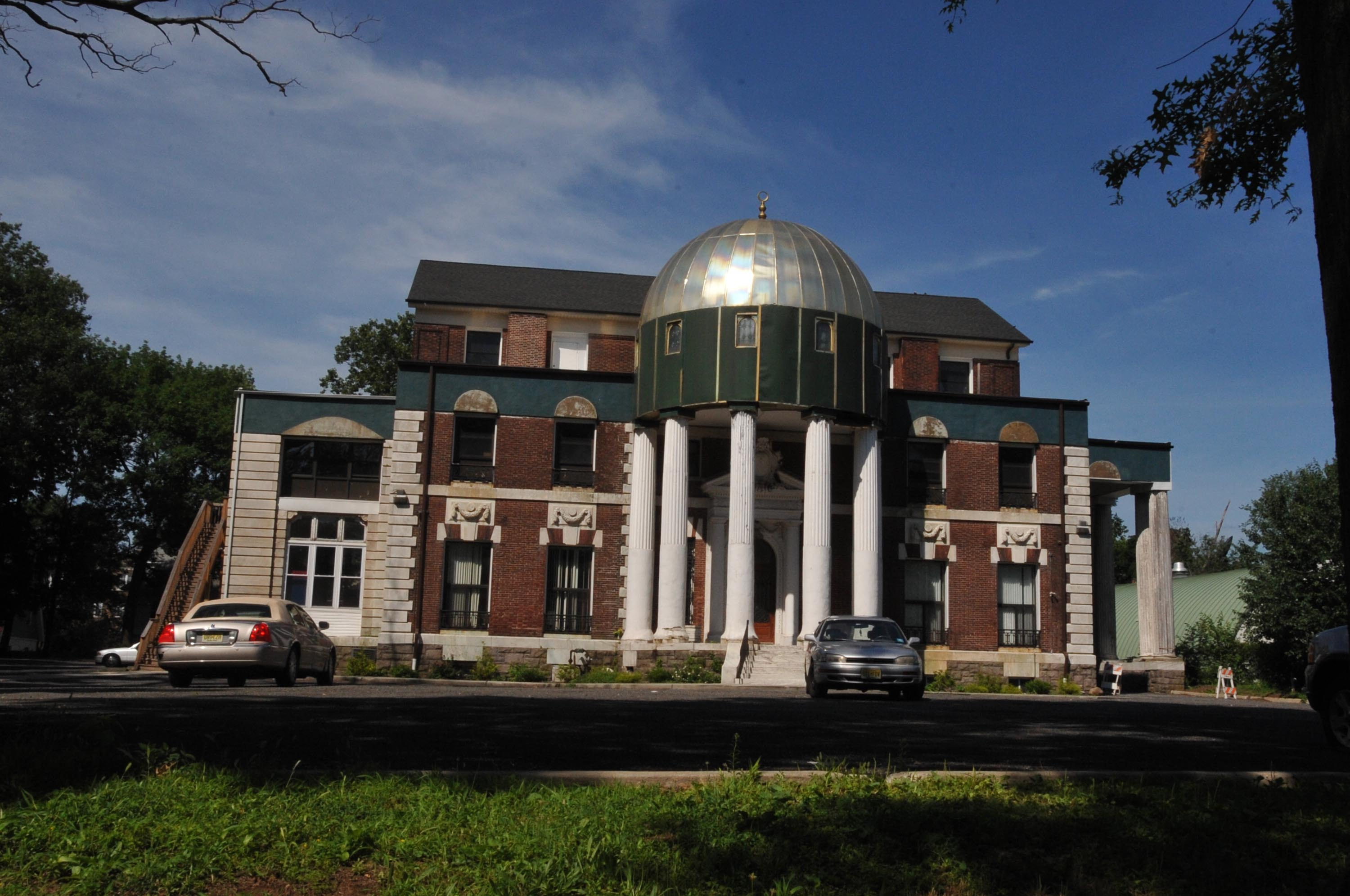

- Location within Union County, New Jersey Location within New Jersey Location within the United States
- Location: 518 Salem Avenue, Elizabeth, New Jersey
- Coordinates: 40°40′35″N 74°12′53″W
- Built: 1909
- Architect: Carrere & Hastings
- Architectural style: Colonial Revival, Georgian Revival
- NRHP reference No.: 86000389
- NJRHP No.: 2664

Significant dates
- Added to NRHP: March 13, 1986
- Designated NJRHP: February 5, 1986

The Charles N. Fowler House is located at 518 Salem Avenue in the city of Elizabeth in Union County, New Jersey, United States. Built in 1909, it is a prominent local example of Georgian Revival architecture, featuring a semi-circular projecting Doric portico topped by a metal dome (a later addition). It was designed by the New York firm Carrere & Hastings for Charles N. Fowler, a prominent local banker and United States Congressman. In 1930 Fowler sold the building to the Vail-Deane School. It is now home to a Dar-ul-Islam, an Islamic mosque and community center.

The historic house was listed on the National Register of Historic Places on March 13, 1986, for its significance in architecture and politics/government.

== See also ==
- National Register of Historic Places listings in Union County, New Jersey
