= Eugene F. Kinkead =

American politician (1876–1960)

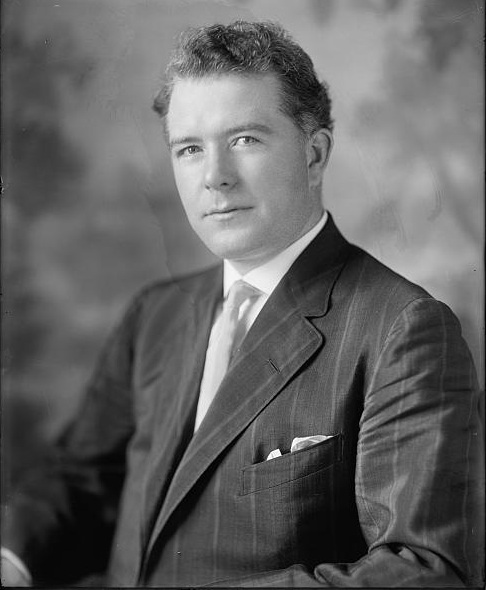
- Kinkead c. 1940

Member of the U.S. House of Representatives from New Jersey
- In office March 4, 1909 – February 4, 1915
- Preceded by: Eugene W. Leake
- Succeeded by: Edward W. Gray
- Constituency: 9th district (1909–13); 8th district (1913–15)

Personal details
- Born: Eugene Francis Kinkead; March 27, 1876 Buttevant, County Cork, Ireland
- Died: September 6, 1960 (aged 84) South Orange, New Jersey, U.S.
- Resting place: Gate of Heaven Cemetery
- Party: Democratic

Eugene Francis Kinkead (March 27, 1876 – September 6, 1960), was an American businessman and Democratic Party politician from New Jersey who represented the 9th congressional district from 1909 to 1913, and the 8th district from 1913 to 1915.

== Biography ==
Kinkead was born while his parents were on a visit abroad, in Buttevant, County Cork, Ireland, United Kingdom on March 27, 1876. He attended parochial schools in Jersey City, New Jersey, and graduated from Seton Hall College in South Orange, New Jersey in 1895. He was president of the Jersey Railway Advertising Co. and the Orange Publishing Co. Kinkead was president of the board of aldermen of Jersey City in 1898.

=== Congress ===
Kinkead was elected as a Democrat to the Sixty-first, Sixty-second, and Sixty-third Congresses and served in office from March 4, 1909, until February 4, 1915, when he resigned.

=== Later career ===
After leaving Congress, he was sheriff of Hudson County, New Jersey from 1915 to 1917, and played a role in the Bayonne refinery strikes of 1915–1916. He was commissioned major of the military intelligence division of the American forces during World War I and stationed at the National War College in Washington, D.C. He was chairman of the executive committee of Colonial Trust Co. in New York City from 1929-1960.

=== Death and burial ===
Kinkead died in South Orange, New Jersey, and was interred in Gate of Heaven Cemetery in East Hanover, New Jersey.

U.S. House of Representatives
Preceded by Eugene W. Leake	Member of the U.S. House of Representatives from New Jersey's 9th congressional district March 4, 1909 – March 3, 1913	Succeeded by Walter I. McCoy
Preceded by Walter I. McCoy	Member of the U.S. House of Representatives from New Jersey's 8th congressional district March 4, 1913 – February 4, 1915	Succeeded by Edward W. Gray
