= Thomas Corbally =

Private investigator and adventurer

Thomas Corbally (March 25, 1921 - April 15, 2004) was an American businessman, private investigator and international adventurer. For many years, he rendered investigative services (specializing in industrial espionage) for Kroll Associates as an independent contractor "who brought the ghosts of Longie Zwillman, occupied Germany and Swinging London straight into the corporate boardroom."

Corbally was born and raised in Newark, New Jersey. According to journalist Eamon Javers, his paternal grandfather (also named Thomas Corbally) "had been an Irish beat cop in Newark who worked his way up to detective and then founded his own private investigative firm in the early ’20s: the Corbally Detective Agency, where Tom’s uncles and father all worked as private investigators at various points in Tom’s childhood. Bad guys and mobsters [including the aforementioned Zwillman] swirled around the agency, as did politicians. Tom’s maternal grandfather, Paul Moore, was even elected to Congress as a Democrat, serving a single term from 1927 to 1929." Corbally later maintained that his teenage exploits as a trans-Atlantic stowaway partially inspired onetime acquaintance James Cameron's Titanic.

During World War II and its aftermath, he served in the Royal Canadian Air Force until 1943 before working in Allied-occupied Germany as a civilian employee of the "War Department Detachment" (believed to be a front for the Office of Strategic Services, the Central Intelligence Agency and the United States Army Counterintelligence Corps) through at least 1949. Corbally was involved in the investigation of the Profumo affair and was the subject himself of two documented FBI investigations during the 1960s. Throughout his career, his circle of friends and associates allegedly encompassed such disparate figures as John F. Kennedy, Henry Kissinger, Bob Hope, Faye Dunaway, Lee Iacocca, Roy Cohn, Heidi Fleiss, Jordan Belfort and members of the House of Saud.

A resident of the Upper East Side of Manhattan, he died in 2004 of complications from heart disease at the age of 83. He was survived by his third and final wife, Renee Lucidi. In 1956, he was married for three days to nationally ranked tennis player Gussie Moran, who had previously been married to Corbally's best friend, transport executive Eddie Hand.
