= William H. Wiley =

American politician, and publisher (1842–1925)

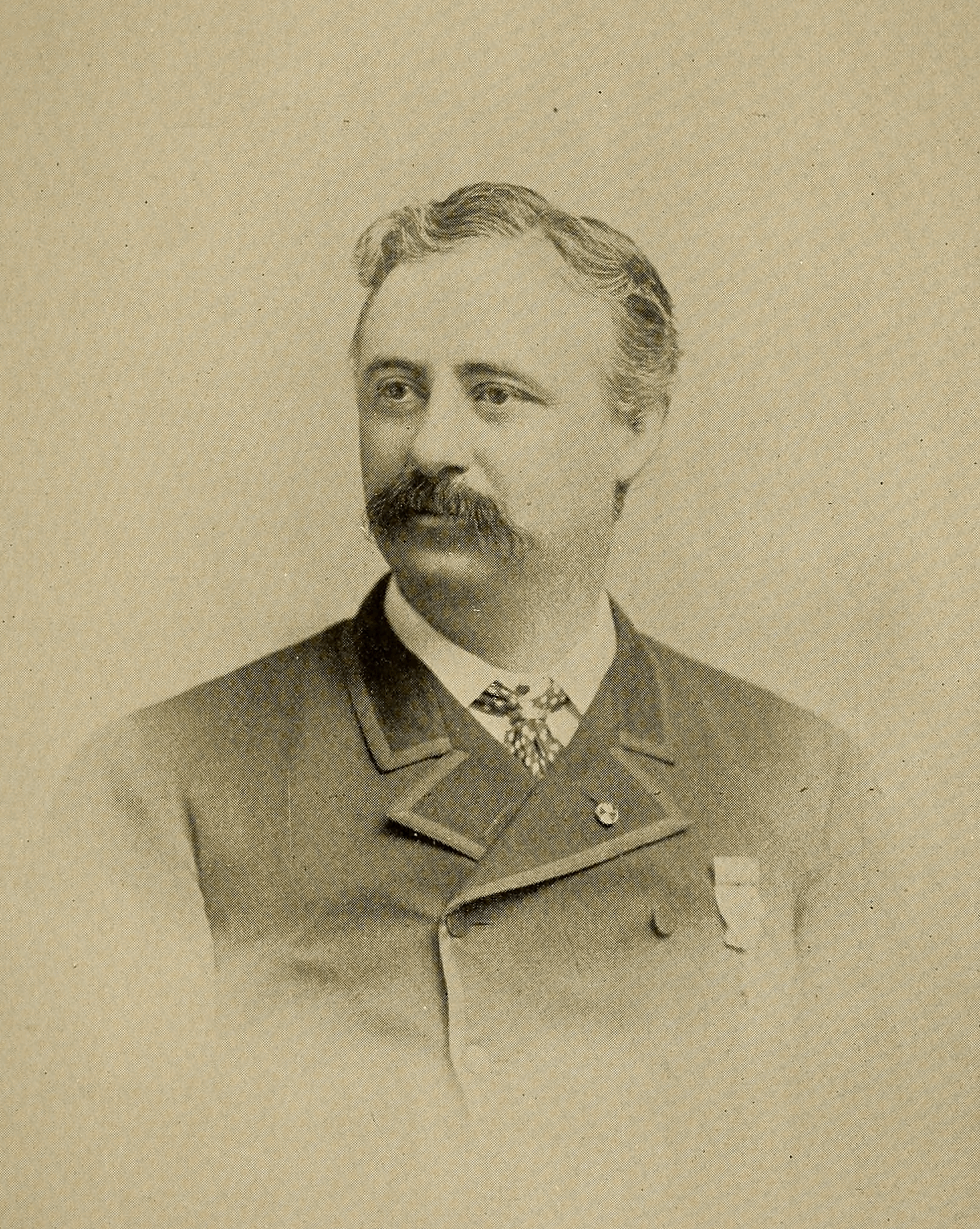
- Wiley c. 1891

Member of the U.S. House of Representatives from New Jersey's 8th district
- In office March 4, 1909 – March 3, 1911
- Preceded by: Le Gage Pratt
- Succeeded by: Walter I. McCoy
- In office March 4, 1903 – March 3, 1907
- Preceded by: Charles N. Fowler
- Succeeded by: Le Gage Pratt

Personal details
- Born: July 10, 1842 New York City, US
- Died: May 2, 1925 (aged 82) Orange, New Jersey, US
- Party: Republican

William Halsted Wiley (July 10, 1842 – May 2, 1925), was an American Republican Party politician who represented New Jersey's 8th congressional district from 1903 to 1907 and from 1909 to 1911, and was also a co-founder and former president of the publishing company John Wiley & Sons.

== Education ==
Wiley was born in New York City on July 10, 1842. In 1861 he graduated from the College of the City of New York in 1861 and proceeded to enter the Union Army in 1860 as a member of the Seventh New York Volunteers. He was promoted to first lieutenant of Volunteers in 1862 and mustered out with the rank of brevet major in 1864 by the consolidation of his regiment. After successful Artillery commanding and the end of the war he went to Rensselaer Polytechnic Institute. He was one of the first members of the Theta Xi fraternity's Alpha chapter at Rensselaer and remained involved in that fraternity for 60 years. After graduating with a degree in engineering he attended the Columbia College School of Mines in 1868. There he was engaged in civil engineering and also as a superintendent of a mine for several years and a member of the township committee of East Orange, New Jersey, from 1886 to 1888, and president one year. Actively involved in politics, he was also president of one of the juries at the International Exposition in Brussels and a member of the superior jury appointed by the Governor of New Jersey a member of the commission for the Louisiana Purchase Exposition at St. Louis, Mo., in 1904.

== Congressional stay ==
Wiley was first elected as a Republican to the 58th Congress as a representative for New Jersey and re-elected to the 59th Congress (March 4, 1903 – March 4, 1907). His run for re-election in 1906 was unsuccessful, however. But he did manage a re-election the next term into the 61st Congress (March 4, 1909 – March 4, 1911). After another unsuccessful bid for reelection in 1910, he moved on to work with his family in founding a publishing company in New York City.

== Publishing company ==
In 1876, he entered the publishing business with his father and brother, co-founding a firm under the name of John Wiley & Sons. The family company began by publishing works by authors such as Cooper, Emerson, Melville, and Poe. Once in charge, Wiley phased out all publishing programs not concerned with science and technology and established the firm as America's premier publisher of scientific and technical books. By 1895 the company became a worldwide organization, distributing American scientific knowledge around the globe.

Wiley died in East Orange on May 2, 1925.

U.S. House of Representatives
Preceded by Charles N. Fowler	Member of the U.S. House of Representatives from New Jersey's 8th congressional district March 4, 1903 – March 3, 1907	Succeeded by Le Gage Pratt
Preceded by Le Gage Pratt	Member of the U.S. House of Representatives from New Jersey's 8th congressional district March 4, 1909 – March 3, 1911	Succeeded by Walter I. McCoy
