= East Newark, New Jersey =

Borough in Hudson County, New Jersey, US

- Borough
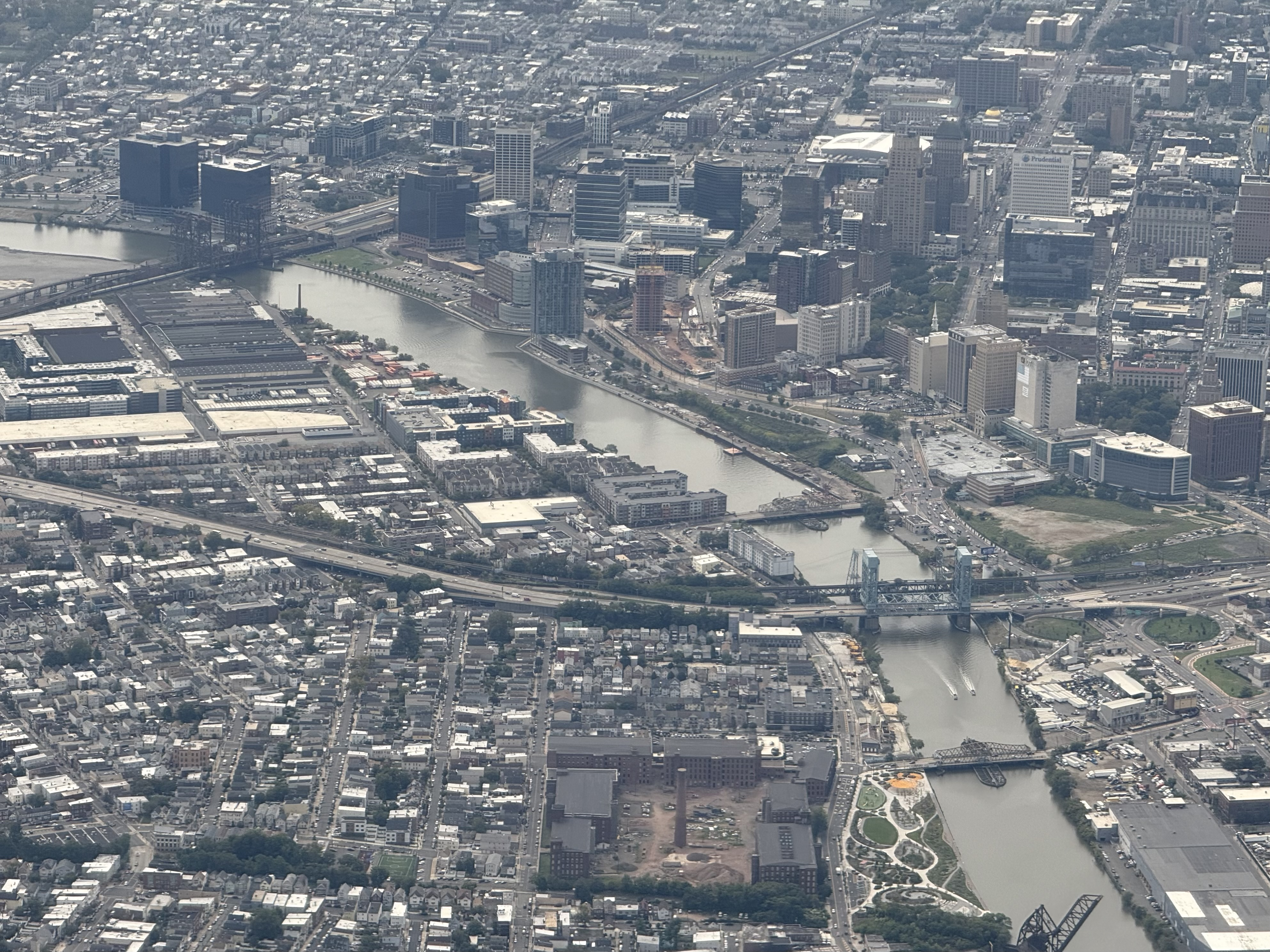
- Aerial view of East Newark (center foreground), with Harrison visible on the left, and the city of Newark on the opposite shore of the Passaic River

- Seal

- Location of East Newark in Hudson County highlighted in red (left). Inset map: Location of Hudson County in New Jersey highlighted in orange (right).

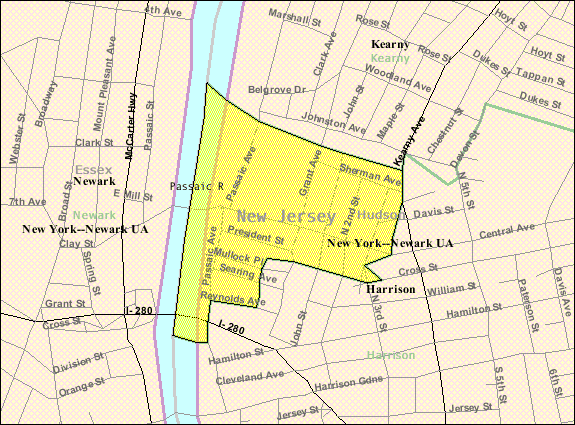
- Census Bureau map of East Newark, New Jersey

- Location in Hudson County Location in New Jersey Location in the United States
- Coordinates: 40.752011°N 74.162189°W
- Country: United States
- State: New Jersey
- County: Hudson
- Incorporated: July 2, 1895

Government
  - Type: Borough
  - Body: Borough Council
  - Mayor: Dina M. Grilo (D, term ends December 31, 2027)
  - Administrator: Fred Confessore
  - Municipal clerk: Cosmo A. Cirillo

Area
  - Total: 0.12 sq mi (0.32 km^{2})
  - Land: 0.10 sq mi (0.27 km^{2})
  - Water: 0.023 sq mi (0.06 km^{2}) 16.92%
  - Rank: 564th of 565 in state 12th of 12 in county
- Elevation: 16 ft (4.9 m)

Population (2020)
  - Total: 2,594
  - Estimate (2023): 2,428
  - Rank: 464th of 565 in state 12th of 12 in county
  - Density: 25,301.5/sq mi (9,769.0/km^{2})
  - Rank: 6th of 565 in state 5th of 12 in county
- Time zone: UTC−05:00 (Eastern (EST))
  - Summer (DST): UTC−04:00 (Eastern (EDT))
- ZIP Code: 07029
- Area code: 973
- FIPS code: 3401719360
- GNIS feature ID: 0885199
- Website: www.boroughofeastnewark.com

East Newark is a borough in the western part of Hudson County, in the U.S. state of New Jersey. The borough, a suburb of Newark, which sits across the Passaic River, is the second-smallest municipality by total area in the state.

The Borough of East Newark was established on July 2, 1895, from portions of Kearny lying between the Erie Railroad's Newark Branch right of way and Harrison, based on the results of a referendum held the previous day.

As of the 2020 United States census, the borough's population was 2,594, an increase of 188 (+7.8%) from the 2010 census count of 2,406, which in turn reflected an increase of 29 (+1.2%) from the 2,377 counted in the 2000 census.

== Geography ==
According to the United States Census Bureau, the borough had a total area of 0.13 square miles (0.32 km^{2}), including 0.10 square miles (0.27 km^{2}) of land and 0.02 square miles (0.06 km^{2}) of water (16.92%).

The borough is bordered to the north by Kearny and to the south and east by Harrison, both in Hudson County, and to the west by the Passaic River across from which is Newark in Essex County.

The Clark Thread Company Historic District is located in the borough.

== Demographics ==
Historical population
Census	Pop.	Note	%±
1900	2,500		—
1910	3,163		26.5%
1920	3,057		−3.4%
1930	2,686		−12.1%
1940	2,273		−15.4%
1950	2,173		−4.4%
1960	1,872		−13.9%
1970	1,922		2.7%
1980	1,923		0.1%
1990	2,157		12.2%
2000	2,377		10.2%
2010	2,406		1.2%
2020	2,594		7.8%
2023 (est.)	2,428	▼	−6.4%
Population sources: 1900–1920; 1900–1910 1910–1930; 1940–2000 2000; 2010 2020

=== Racial and ethnic composition ===
East Newark borough, New Jersey – Racial and ethnic composition Note: the US Census treats Hispanic/Latino as an ethnic category. This table excludes Latinos from the racial categories and assigns them to a separate category. Hispanics/Latinos may be of any race.
Race / Ethnicity (NH = Non-Hispanic)	Pop 2000	Pop 2010	Pop 2020	% 2000	% 2010	% 2020
White alone (NH)	1,058	668	511	44.51%	27.76%	19.70%
Black or African American alone (NH)	22	17	54	0.93%	0.71%	2.08%
Native American or Alaska Native alone (NH)	3	2	2	0.13%	0.08%	0.08%
Asian alone (NH)	59	188	257	2.48%	7.81%	9.91%
Native Hawaiian or Pacific Islander alone (NH)	1	0	0	0.04%	0.00%	0.00%
Other race alone (NH)	42	30	82	1.77%	1.25%	3.16%
Mixed race or Multiracial (NH)	62	24	69	2.61%	1.00%	2.66%
Hispanic or Latino (any race)	1,130	1,477	1,619	47.54%	61.39%	62.41%
Total	2,377	2,406	2,594	100.00%	100.00%	100.00%

=== 2020 census ===
As of the 2020 census, East Newark had a population of 2,594. The median age was 35.2 years. 20.7% of residents were under the age of 18 and 10.1% of residents were 65 years of age or older. For every 100 females there were 100.3 males, and for every 100 females age 18 and over there were 99.1 males age 18 and over.

100.0% of residents lived in urban areas, while 0.0% lived in rural areas.

There were 889 households in East Newark, of which 41.7% had children under the age of 18 living in them. Of all households, 40.3% were married-couple households, 22.6% were households with a male householder and no spouse or partner present, and 29.9% were households with a female householder and no spouse or partner present. About 15.8% of all households were made up of individuals and 3.5% had someone living alone who was 65 years of age or older.

There were 920 housing units, of which 3.4% were vacant. The homeowner vacancy rate was 1.4% and the rental vacancy rate was 3.0%.

=== 2010 census ===
The 2010 United States census counted 2,406 people, 759 households, and 569 families in the borough. The population density was 23,532.1 per square mile (9,085.8/km^{2}). There were 794 housing units at an average density of 7,765.8 per square mile (2,998.4/km^{2}). The racial makeup was 63.01% (1,516) White, 1.91% (46) Black or African American, 0.42% (10) Native American, 7.81% (188) Asian, 0.04% (1) Pacific Islander, 22.90% (551) from other races, and 3.91% (94) from two or more races. Hispanic or Latino of any race were 61.39% (1,477) of the population.

Of the 759 households, 36.6% had children under the age of 18; 45.2% were married couples living together; 18.7% had a female householder with no husband present and 25.0% were non-families. Of all households, 15.3% were made up of individuals and 4.3% had someone living alone who was 65 years of age or older. The average household size was 3.17 and the average family size was 3.38.

22.0% of the population were under the age of 18, 14.6% from 18 to 24, 32.2% from 25 to 44, 24.0% from 45 to 64, and 7.3% who were 65 years of age or older. The median age was 31.9 years. For every 100 females, the population had 101.8 males. For every 100 females ages 18 and older there were 100.1 males.

The Census Bureau's 2006–2010 American Community Survey showed that (in 2010 inflation-adjusted dollars) median household income was $54,722 (with a margin of error of +/− $5,909) and the median family income was $59,423 (+/− $9,367). Males had a median income of $41,173 (+/− $3,762) versus $28,224 (+/− $4,249) for females. The per capita income for the borough was $22,242 (+/− $2,054). About 7.9% of families and 12.5% of the population were below the poverty line, including 15.3% of those under age 18 and 16.1% of those age 65 or over.

=== 2000 census ===
As of the 2000 United States census, there were 2,377 people, 767 households, and 605 families residing in the borough. The population density was 23,330.0 inhabitants per square mile (9,007.8/km^{2}). There were 799 housing units at an average density of 7,842.1 per square mile (3,027.9/km^{2}). The racial makeup of the borough was 67.02% White, 1.68% African American, 0.50% Native American, 2.52% Asian, 0.04% Pacific Islander, 20.99% from other races, and 7.24% from two or more races. Hispanic or Latino of any race were 47.54% of the population.

As of the 2000 Census, 10.1% of East Newark's residents identified themselves as being of Peruvian American ancestry. This was the highest percentage of Peruvian American people in any place in the United States. In the same census, 6.2% of East Newark's residents identified themselves as being of Brazilian American ancestry, which was the highest percentage of Brazilian American people in any place in the United States. As of the 2000 Census, 7.67% of East Newark's residents identified themselves as being of Ecuadorian ancestry, which was the highest of any municipality in New Jersey and the third highest percentage of Ecuadorian people in any place in the United States with 1,000 or more residents identifying their ancestry.

There were 767 households, out of which 41.9% had children under the age of 18 living with them, 55.0% were married couples living together, 16.0% had a female householder with no husband present, and 21.1% were non-families. 16.0% of all households were made up of individuals, and 5.9% had someone living alone who was 65 years of age or older. The average household size was 3.10 and the average family size was 3.40.

In the borough the population was spread out, with 25.9% under the age of 18, 10.9% from 18 to 24, 36.7% from 25 to 44, 18.8% from 45 to 64, and 7.6% who were 65 years of age or older. The median age was 32 years. For every 100 females, there were 103.9 males. For every 100 females age 18 and over, there were 104.5 males.

The median income for a household in the borough was $44,352, and the median income for a family was $46,375. Males had a median income of $31,875 versus $24,231 for females. The per capita income for the borough was $16,415. About 11.3% of families and 12.6% of the population were below the poverty line, including 17.7% of those under age 18 and 8.6% of those age 65 or over.

== Government ==
=== Local government ===
East Newark is governed under the borough form of New Jersey municipal government, one of 218 municipalities (of the 564) statewide that use this form, the most commonly used form of government in the state. The governing body is comprised of the mayor and the borough council, with all positions elected at-large on a partisan basis as part of the November general election. The mayor is elected directly by the voters to a four-year term of office. The borough council includes six members elected to serve three-year terms on a staggered basis, with two seats coming up for election each year in a three-year cycle. The borough form of government used by East Newark is a "weak mayor / strong council" government in which council members act as the legislative body with the mayor presiding at meetings and voting only in the event of a tie. The mayor can veto ordinances subject to an override by a two-thirds majority vote of the council. The mayor makes committee and liaison assignments for council members, and most appointments are made by the mayor with the advice and consent of the council.

As of 2025, the Mayor of East Newark is Democrat Dina M. Grilo, whose term of office ends December 31, 2027; Mayor Grilo is the first woman to serve as East Newark's mayor, having defeated Democratic-turned-Republican incumbent mayor Joseph Smith in the 2019 local election. Members of the East Newark Borough Council are Chair Christopher Reis (D, 2025), Jessica Diaz (D, 2025), Rose M. Evaristo (D, 2027), Kenneth J. Graham (D, 2027), Acacio De Oliveira (D, 2026) and Jeanne Zincavage (D, 2026).

=== Federal, state and county representation ===
East Newark is located in the 8th Congressional District and is part of New Jersey's 29th state legislative district.

For the 119th United States Congress, New Jersey's 8th congressional district is represented by Rob Menendez (D, Jersey City). New Jersey is represented in the United States Senate by Democrats Cory Booker (Newark, term ends 2027) and Andy Kim (Moorestown, term ends 2031).

For the 2026–2027 session, the 29th legislative district of the New Jersey Legislature is represented in the State Senate by Teresa Ruiz (D, Newark) and in the General Assembly by Eliana Pintor Marin (D, Newark) and Shanique Speight (D, Newark).

Hudson County is governed by the directly elected Hudson County Executive and by a Board of County Commissioners, which serves as the county's legislative body. As of 2025, Hudson County's Hudson County Executive is Craig Guy (D, Jersey City), whose term of office expires December 31, 2027. Hudson County's Commissioners are Kenneth Kopacz (D, District 1 - Bayonne and parts of Jersey City; 2026, Bayonne), William O'Dea (D, District 2 - Western Jersey City; 2026, Jersey City), Vice Chair Jerry Walker (D, District 3 - South Eastern Jersey City Yraida Aponte-Lipski (D, District 4 - North Eastern Jersey City; 2026, Jersey City), Chair Anthony L. Romano Jr. (D, District 5 - Hoboken and parts of Jersey City; 2026, Hoboken), Fanny J. Cedeño (D, District 6 - Union City; 2026, Union City), Caridad Rodriguez (D, District 7 - Weehawken, West New York, and Gutenberg; 2026, West New York), Robert Bascelice (D, District 8 - West New York, North Bergen, Secaucus; 2026, North Bergen) and Albert J. Cifelli (D, District 9 - Secaucus, Kearny, East Newark, Harrison; 2026, Harrison)

Hudson County's constitutional officers are County Clerk E. Junior Maldonado (D, Jersey City, 2027), Register Jeffrey Dublin (D, Jersey City, 2026) Sheriff Frank X. Schillari (R, Jersey City, 2025) and Surrogate Tilo E. Rivas (D, Jersey City, 2029)

=== Politics ===
As of November 2024, there are a total of 1,105 registered voters in East Newark.

Gubernatorial election results for East Newark
Year	Republican		Democratic		Third party(ies)	
Year	No.	%	No.	%	No.	%
2025	131	30.68%	292	68.38%	4	0.94%
2021	92	36.65%	158	62.95%	1	0.40%
2017	40	15.63%	214	83.59%	2	0.78%
2013	75	32.89%	148	64.91%	5	2.19%
2009	71	22.33%	234	73.58%	13	4.09%
2005	44	14.57%	241	79.80%	17	5.63%

In the 2012 presidential election, Democrat Barack Obama received 82.3% of the vote (400 cast), ahead of Republican Mitt Romney with 16.5% (80 votes), and other candidates with 1.2% (6 votes), among the 492 ballots cast by the borough's 844 registered voters (6 ballots were spoiled), for a turnout of 58.3%. In the 2008 presidential election, Democrat Barack Obama received 76.0% of the vote (414 cast), ahead of Republican John McCain with 22.6% (123 votes) and other candidates with 0.7% (4 votes), among the 545 ballots cast by the borough's 904 registered voters, for a turnout of 60.3%. In the 2004 presidential election, Democrat John Kerry received 71.2% of the vote (337 ballots cast), outpolling Republican George W. Bush with 26.4% (125 votes) and other candidates with 0.8% (6 votes), among the 473 ballots cast by the borough's 800 registered voters, for a turnout percentage of 59.1.

Presidential Elections Results
Year	Republican	Democratic	Third Parties
2024	45.7% 258	51.3% 290	3.0% 14
2020	31.7% 201	64.4% 408	3.9% 10
2016	24.6% 135	71.4% 392	3.8% 21
2012	16.5% 80	82.3% 400	1.2% 6
2008	22.6% 123	76.0% 414	0.7% 4
2004	26.4% 125	71.2% 337	0.8% 6

In the 2013 gubernatorial election, Democrat Barbara Buono received 64.9% of the vote (148 cast), ahead of Republican Chris Christie with 32.9% (75 votes), and other candidates with 2.2% (5 votes), among the 232 ballots cast by the borough's 884 registered voters (4 ballots were spoiled), for a turnout of 26.2%. In the 2009 gubernatorial election, Democrat Jon Corzine received 71.8% of the vote (234 ballots cast), ahead of Republican Chris Christie with 21.8% (71 votes) and Independent Chris Daggett with 4.0% (13 votes), among the 326 ballots cast by the borough's 765 registered voters, yielding a 42.6% turnout.

United States Senate election results for East Newark1
Year	Republican		Democratic		Third party(ies)	
Year	No.	%	No.	%	No.	%
2024	172	38.48%	262	58.61%	13	2.91%
2018	85	21.14%	310	77.11%	7	1.74%
2012	59	14.08%	356	84.96%	4	0.95%
2006	67	22.71%	225	76.27%	3	1.02%

United States Senate election results for East Newark2
Year	Republican		Democratic		Third party(ies)	
Year	No.	%	No.	%	No.	%
2020	146	25.30%	396	68.63%	35	6.07%
2014	34	11.45%	260	87.54%	3	1.01%
2013	38	23.31%	124	76.07%	1	0.61%
2008	71	18.64%	299	78.48%	11	2.89%

== Education ==
The East Newark School District serves students in pre-kindergarten through eighth grade. As of the 2023–24 school year, the district, comprised of one school, had an enrollment of 240 students and 19.4 classroom teachers (on an FTE basis), for a student–teacher ratio of 12.4:1.

For ninth through twelfth grades, public school students attend Harrison High School in Harrison, as part of a sending/receiving relationship with the Harrison Public Schools. As of the 2023–24 school year, the high school had an enrollment of 784 students and 53.0 classroom teachers (on an FTE basis), for a student–teacher ratio of 14.8:1.

== Public safety ==
East Newark is protected by a volunteer fire department. There are approximately 34 firefighters who staff one ladder and two engines, one of which is a spare. The department also has shared use of a hazmat mass decontamination trailer unit with the Kearny and Harrison Fire Departments. The fire department has mutual aid agreements with all Hudson County departments and is also a member of the Southern Bergen County Mutual Aid Association.

East Newark has a police department, led by Public Safety Director Al Bringa.

== Transportation ==
=== Roads and highways ===
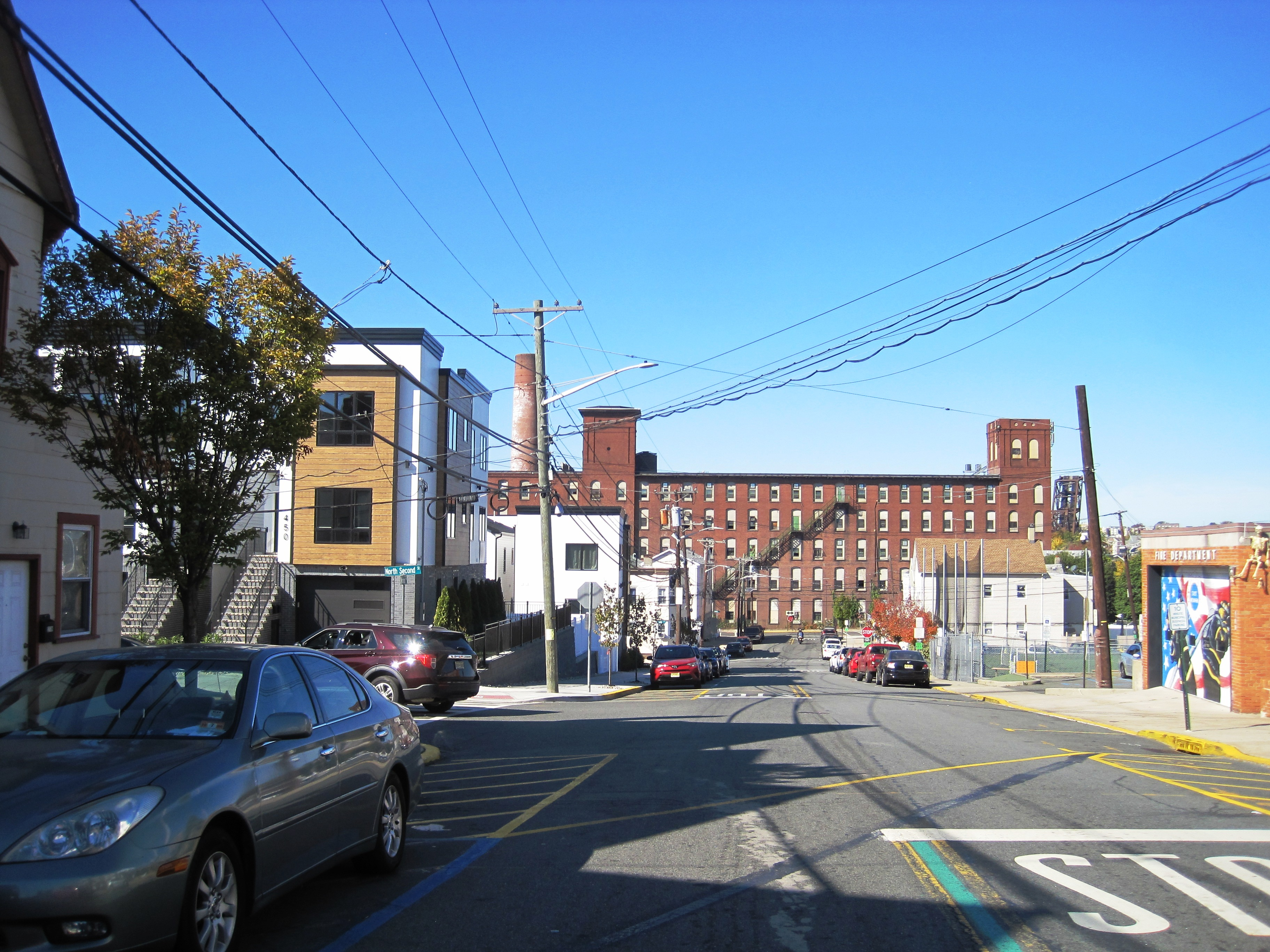
Westbound Sherman Avenue in East Newark

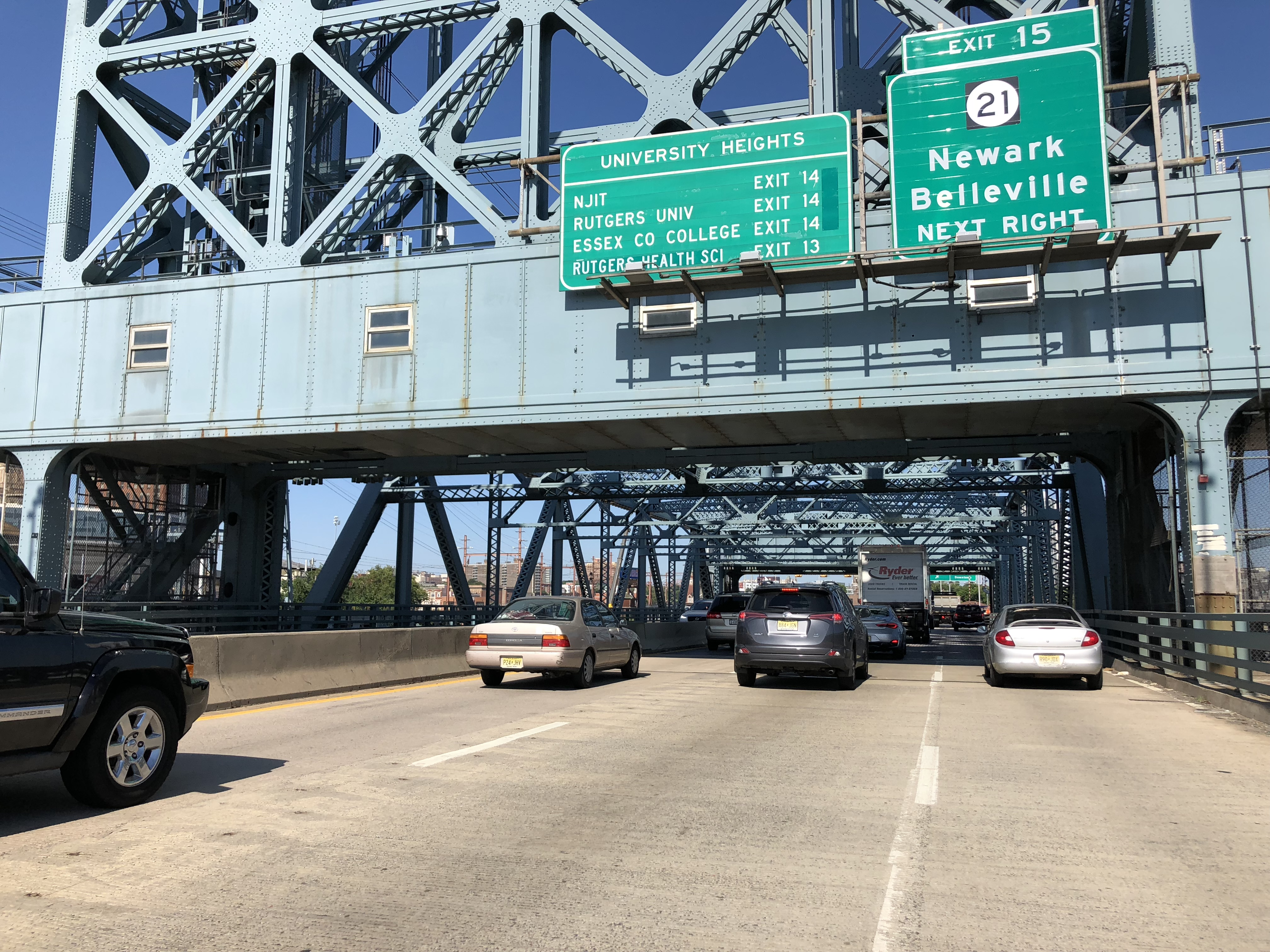
View west along Interstate 280 in East Newark, just before crossing the Stickel Bridge

As of May 2010, the borough had a total of 2.71 miles (4.36 km) of roadways, of which 2.27 miles (3.65 km) were maintained by the municipality and 0.44 miles (0.71 km) by Hudson County.

Interstate 280 passes through the southern portion of the borough. The entrances to interchange 16 lie in adjacent Harrison, and those for interchange 15B lie in Newark across the William A. Stickel Memorial Bridge over the Passaic River, which is crossed by the Clay Street Bridge.

=== Public transportation ===
NJ Transit bus service is available to Newark on the 30 and 76 routes.

The closest NJ Transit rail station to East Newark is the Newark Broad Street Station, with connections to the Montclair-Boonton Line and both branches of the Morris & Essex Lines. The station is also served by the Newark Light Rail. The closest rapid transit service is the PATH's Harrison station, a few blocks south of East Newark.

The closest airport with scheduled passenger service is Newark Liberty International Airport, located 4.8 miles (7.7 km) south in Newark and Elizabeth. John F. Kennedy International Airport and LaGuardia Airport are in Queens, New York City.

== Notable people ==
People who were born in, residents of, or otherwise closely associated with East Newark include:

- Davey Brown (1898–1970), professional soccer player inducted into the National Soccer Hall of Fame in 1951
- Jimmy Douglas (1898–1972), soccer goalkeeper who spent his career in the first American Soccer League
- Philip Kearny (1815–1862), United States Army officer, notable for his leadership in the Mexican–American War and American Civil War
- Ken Kelsch (1947–2023), cinematographer whose films included Bad Lieutenant
- Cornelius Augustine McGlennon (1878–1931), represented New Jersey's 8th congressional district from 1919 to 1921 and was Mayor of East Newark from 1907 to 1919
- Erika Vogt (born 1973), sculptor, printmaker and video artist
