= John T. Dunn =

American politician

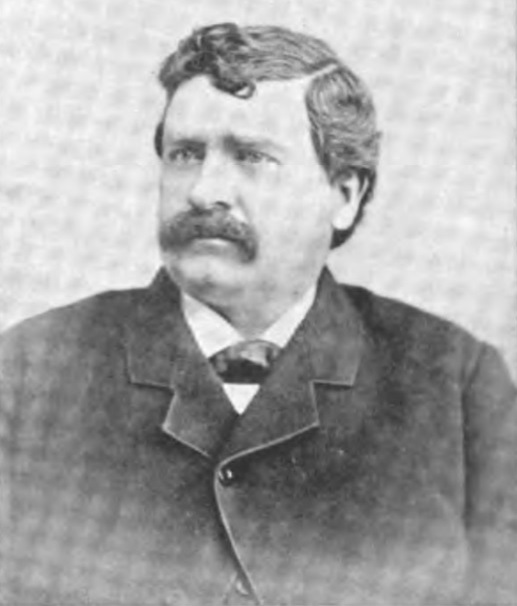
- From the Legislative Supplement to 1895's History of Trenton, New Jersey by Francis Bazley Lee

Member of the U.S. House of Representatives from New Jersey's 8th district
- In office March 4, 1893 – March 3, 1895
- Preceded by: District created
- Succeeded by: Charles N. Fowler

Personal details
- Born: June 4, 1838 County Tipperary, Ireland
- Died: February 22, 1907 (aged 68) Elizabeth, New Jersey, U.S.
- Party: Democratic

John Thomas Dunn (June 4, 1838 – February 22, 1907) was a U.S. representative from New Jersey.

== Biography ==
Born in County Tipperary in Ireland (then a part of the U.K.), Dunn immigrated to the United States with his father, who settled in New Jersey in 1845. He completed elementary studies at home. He engaged in business in 1862.

Dunn was elected a member of the board of aldermen of Elizabeth, New Jersey in 1878. He served as member of the New Jersey General Assembly from 1879 to 1882 and was speaker of the house in 1882. He studied law, was admitted to the bar in 1882 and commenced practice in Elizabeth, New Jersey. Dunn was again elected a member of the city council.

Dunn was elected as a Democrat to the Fifty-third Congress, where he represented the newly created 8th congressional district from March 4, 1893 – March 3, 1895. He was an unsuccessful candidate for reelection in 1894 to the Fifty-fourth Congress.

After leaving office he resumed the practice of law. He died in Elizabeth, New Jersey, February 22, 1907, and was interred in Mount Olivet Cemetery in Newark, New Jersey.

U.S. House of Representatives
Preceded by New District	Member of the U.S. House of Representatives from New Jersey's 8th congressional district March 4, 1893 – March 3, 1895	Succeeded by Charles N. Fowler
