= Le Gage Pratt =

American businessman and politician (1852–1911)

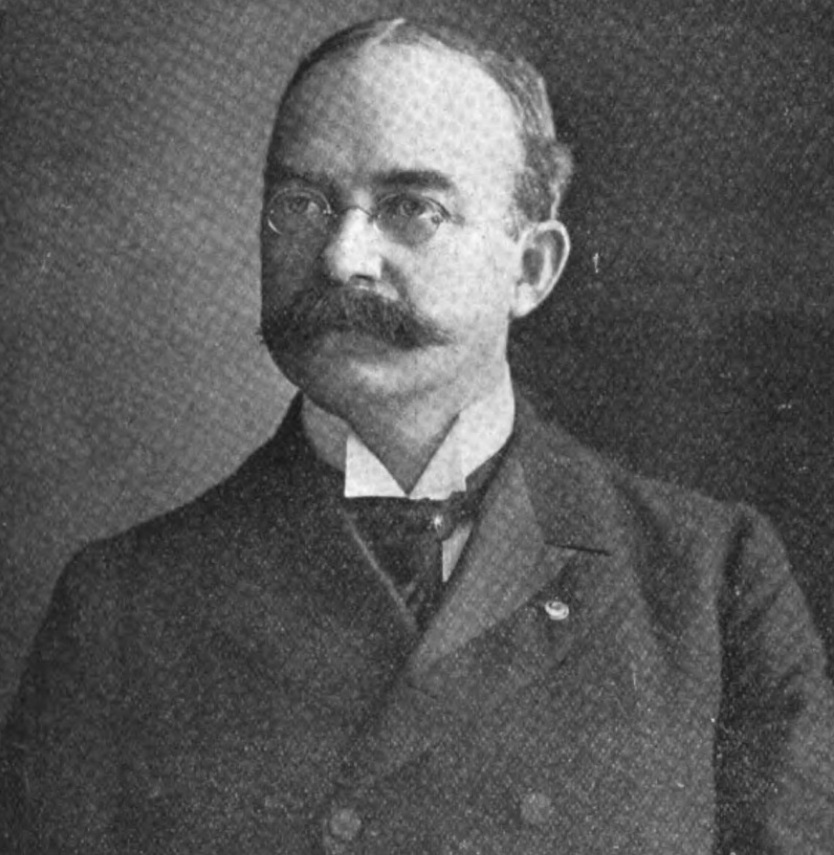
- From the March 15, 1911 edition of The Insurance Press magazine

Member of the U.S. House of Representatives from New Jersey's 8th district
- In office March 4, 1907 – March 3, 1909
- Preceded by: William H. Wiley
- Succeeded by: William H. Wiley

Personal details
- Born: December 14, 1852 Sterling, Massachusetts, US
- Died: March 9, 1911 (aged 58) Newark, New Jersey, US
- Party: Democratic

Le Gage Pratt (December 14, 1852 – March 9, 1911) was an American businessman and politician who served as a U.S. Representative from New Jersey for one term from 1907 to 1909.

== Early life and career ==
Born in Sterling, Massachusetts, Pratt was educated in the common schools. In 1869, he began a commercial career in Boston. He subsequently moved with his parents to Chicago, Illinois, where he engaged in newspaper work in Chicago 1884–1886. He was employed for several years in the life insurance business in Texas. He was subsequently transferred to Illinois and Nebraska and continued in that business.

In 1897, he tendered his resignation and moved to East Orange, New Jersey, where in 1903 he accepted a position with the Mutual Benefit Life Insurance Company at Newark, New Jersey. He was named company vice president, an office he held until elected to Congress.

== Congress ==
Pratt was elected as a Democrat to the Sixtieth Congress (March 4, 1907 – March 3, 1909). While in office, he investigated allegations of kickbacks during the construction of the Panama Canal. He was an unsuccessful candidate for reelection in 1908 to the Sixty-first Congress. He resumed the insurance business and became connected with the Puritan Life Insurance Co., of Providence, Rhode Island.

== Death ==
He died in Newark, New Jersey, March 9, 1911. He was interred in Fairmount Cemetery in Newark.

U.S. House of Representatives
Preceded by William H. Wiley	Member of the U.S. House of Representatives from New Jersey's 8th congressional district March 4, 1907 – March 3, 1909	Succeeded by William H. Wiley
