= Thomas J. Callan =

Recipient of the Medal of Honor

Thomas Joseph Callan
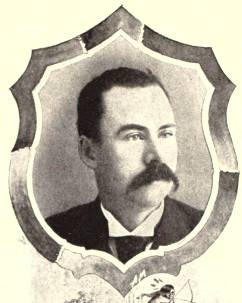
- Thomas J. Callan as depicted in Deeds of Valor, Volume II
- Born: July 12, 1853; County Louth, Ireland
- Died: March 5, 1908 (aged 54); Yonkers, New York, US
- Burial place: Holy Sepulchre Cemetery, East Orange, New Jersey
- Military career
- Allegiance: United States
- Branch: United States Army
- Service years: 1876–1881
- Rank: Private
- Unit: 7th United States Cavalry
- Conflicts: Indian Wars; *Battle of Little Big Horn
- Awards: Medal of Honor

Thomas Joseph Callan (July 12, 1853 – May 5, 1908) was a United States Army soldier who received the Medal of Honor for his bravery during the Battle of Little Big Horn in 1876.

== Biography ==
Callan was born in County Louth, Ireland on July 12, 1853, and joined the US Army in March 1876.

He had served just three months as a private in Company B, 7th United States Cavalry, at the time of his actions. He received the Medal of Honor for his bravery at the Battle of Little Big Horn, Montana Territory, on June 25, and June 26, 1876. His medal was issued on October 24, 1896.

He died on May 5, 1908, in Yonkers, New York and was buried in Holy Sepulchre Cemetery, East Orange, New Jersey.

== Medal of Honor citation ==
Rank and organization: Private, Company B, 7th U.S. Cavalry. Place and date. At Little Big Horn, Mont., 25-June 26, 1876. Entered service at: Boston, Mass. Birth: Ireland. Date of issue: October 24, 1896.

Citation:

Volunteered and succeeded in obtaining water for the wounded of the command; also displayed conspicuously good conduct in assistlng (sic) to drive away the Indians.

== See also ==
- List of Medal of Honor recipients
- List of Medal of Honor recipients for the Indian Wars
