= Erika Vogt =

American sculptor and video artist

Erika Vogt (born in 1973) is a sculptor, printmaker and video artist. She is represented at both Overduin & Co. in Los Angeles and Simone Subal Gallery in New York City.

Vogt uses a range of media and techniques in order to explore the mutability of images and objects. Her installations are frequently suspended from ropes or on moving racks, merging both sculpture, drawing, video, and photography to produce "heterogeneous constellations". Vogt has specified that her background in both feminist and queer video and then later in Los Angeles with experimental film has been influential to her work.

== Early life and education ==
Voft was born in East Newark, New Jersey. She received her BFA from New York University and her MFA from California Institute of the Arts.

== Work ==
Vogt's installations can be experienced as cinematic environments. She has a layered quality in her films which expand into physical space. There is a lack of permanence in Vogt's images and she experiments with obscuring her video’s content. In Vogt's recent work, she takes as her subject the ritual use and exchange of objects, such as currency, and investigates the empathetic relationship between objects and people. At Human Resources Los Angeles Vogt filled the upstairs gallery space with 800 panels of plaster titled Sounded Out. These were stepped on by visitors gradually dissolving into its initial material. Painted money covered the walls in a piece titled Notes on Currency IOU.

== Exhibitions ==
Vogt has screened and exhibited nationally and internationally including exhibitions at the Hammer Museum, Los Angeles County Museum of Art, Centre Pompidou, the Museum of Modern Art, and Contemporary Arts Center. Solo exhibitions include: Hepworth Wakefield, West Yorkshire, UK (2014); Triangle France, Marseilles, France (2014); New Museum (2013); Simone Subal Gallery, New York, NY (2012); Overduin and Kite, Los Angeles, CA (2010); Room Gallery, University of California, Irvine (2010); and Daniel Hug, Los Angeles, CA (2008) She was a 2012 Mohn Award Finalist and was in the Whitney Biennial in 2010.
