= Albert Oss =

- Born: 1818; Belgium
- Died: December 18 1898 (aged 79–80); New Jersey, US
- Burial place: Holy Sepulchre Cemetery, East Orange, New Jersey
- Military career
- Allegiance: United States of America; Union
- Branch: Union Army
- Service years: 1862 - 1865
- Rank: Private
- Units: Company B, 11th New Jersey Volunteer Infantry Regiment
- Conflicts: American Civil War
- Awards: Medal of Honor

Albert Oss (1818 – December 18, 1898) was a soldier in the Union Army during the American Civil War who received the Medal of Honor. He served in the 11th New Jersey Volunteer Infantry Regiment.

== Biography ==
Albert Oss was born in 1818 and immigrated to the United States from Belgium. He joined the 11th New Jersey Infantry from Newark, New Jersey in July 1862, and mustered out with the regiment in June 1865.

Oss died on December 18, 1898. He is buried in Holy Sepulchre Cemetery, East Orange, New Jersey and his grave can be found in Section H, Soldiers' Plot, Lot 137, Grave 4.

== Medal of Honor citation ==

Rank and Organization:

Private, Company B, 11th New Jersey Infantry. Place and Date: At Chancellorsville, Va., May 3, 1863. Entered Service At: Newark, N.J. Birth: Belgium. Date of Issue: May 6, 1892.

Citation:

Remained in the rifle pits after the others had retreated, firing constantly, and contesting the ground step by step.

== See also ==
- List of Medal of Honor recipients
- List of American Civil War Medal of Honor recipients: M–P
