= Herbert W. Taylor =

American politician (1869–1931)

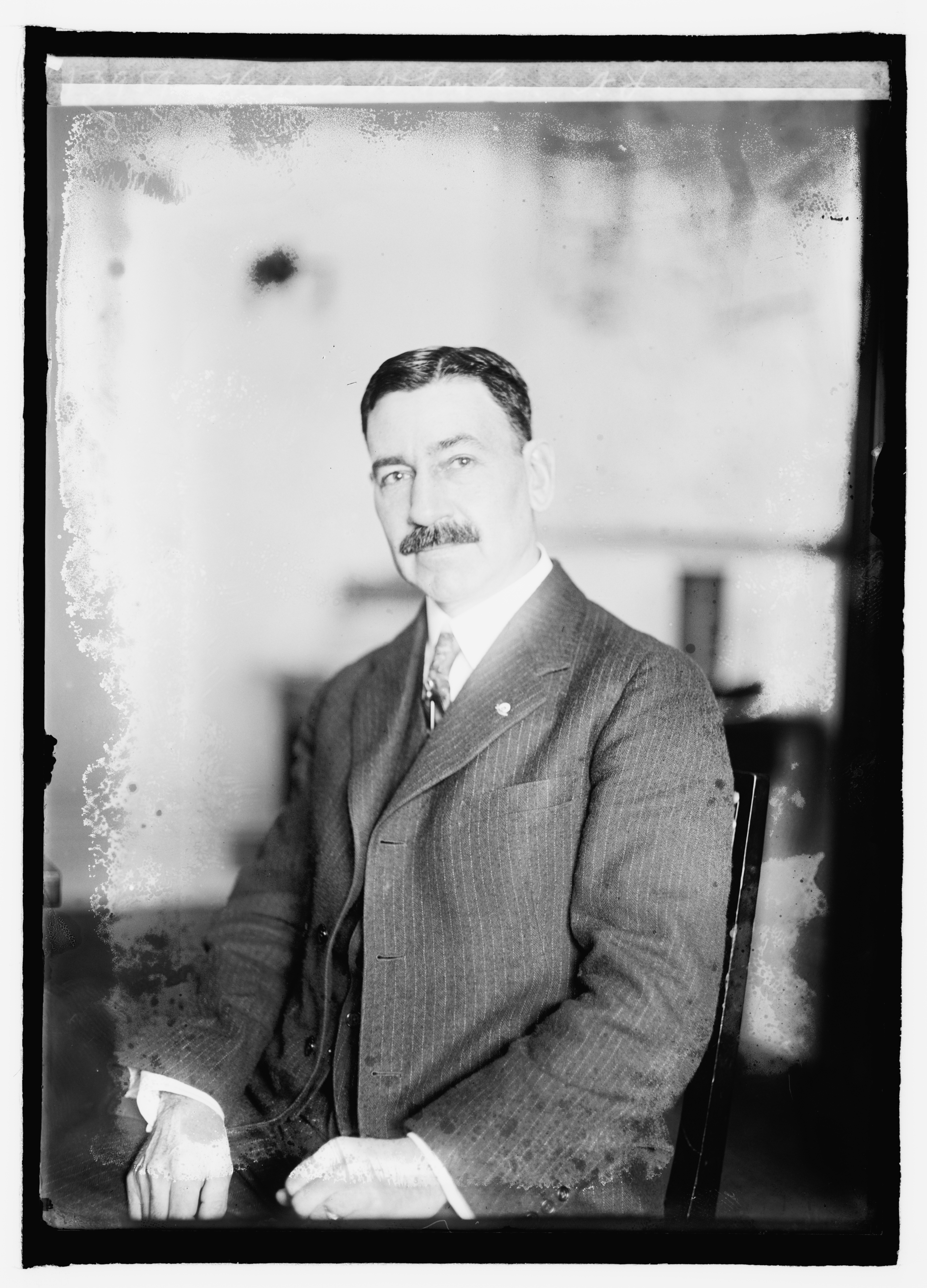
- National Photo Company Collection, Library of Congress

Member of the U.S. House of Representatives from New Jersey's 8th district
- In office March 4, 1925 – March 3, 1927
- Preceded by: Frank Joseph McNulty
- Succeeded by: Paul J. Moore
- In office March 4, 1921 – March 3, 1923
- Preceded by: Cornelius Augustine McGlennon
- Succeeded by: Frank Joseph McNulty

Personal details
- Born: Herbert Worthington Taylor; February 19, 1869 Belleville, New Jersey
- Died: October 15, 1931 (aged 62) Newark, New Jersey
- Resting place: East Ridgelawn Cemetery
- Party: Republican

Herbert Worthington Taylor (February 19, 1869, Belleville, New Jersey – October 15, 1931, Newark, New Jersey) was an American Republican Party politician who represented New Jersey's 8th congressional district in the United States House of Representatives from 1921 to 1923 and from 1925 to 1927.

== Early life and career ==
Taylor was born in Belleville, New Jersey, on February 19, 1869, where he attended the public schools. He graduated from the New York University School of Law in 1891, was admitted to the New York bar the same year and to the New Jersey bar in 1897.

He practiced in New York City and Newark. Taylor was a member of the common council of Newark from 1899 to 1903 and served in the New Jersey General Assembly in 1904 and 1905. He was chairman of the Essex County Republican committee from 1913 to 1917 and was a delegate to the 1916 Republican National Convention. He was county counsel of Essex County from 1916 to 1921.

== Congress ==
Taylor was elected as a Republican to the Sixty-seventh Congress, serving from March 4, 1921 to March 3, 1923, but was an unsuccessful candidate for renomination in 1922. After his first term, he resumed the practice of law in Newark. He was elected to the Sixty-ninth Congress, serving in his second term from March 4, 1925 to March 3, 1927, but was again an unsuccessful candidate for reelection in 1926.

== Later career and death ==
After leaving Congress, he resumed the practice of law in Newark, where he died on October 15, 1931. He was interred in East Ridgelawn Cemetery in the Delawanna section of Clifton, New Jersey.

U.S. House of Representatives
Preceded by Cornelius Augustine McGlennon	Member of the U.S. House of Representatives from New Jersey's 8th congressional district March 4, 1921 – March 3, 1923	Succeeded by Frank Joseph McNulty
Preceded by Frank Joseph McNulty	Member of the U.S. House of Representatives from New Jersey's 8th congressional district March 4, 1925 – March 3, 1927	Succeeded by Paul J. Moore
