= Mayor of East Newark, New Jersey =

East Newark, New Jersey, was incorporated on July 3, 1895. It is governed under the borough form of New Jersey municipal government. The governing body consists of a mayor and a borough council comprising six council members, with all positions elected at-large on a partisan basis as part of the November general election. A mayor is elected directly by the voters to a four-year term of office. The borough council consists of six members elected to serve three-year terms on a staggered basis, with two seats coming up for election each year in a three-year cycle. The borough form of government used by East Newark, the most common system used in the state, is a "weak mayor / strong council" government in which council members act as the legislative body with the mayor presiding at meetings and voting only in the event of a tie. The mayor can veto ordinances subject to an override by a two-thirds majority vote of the council. The mayor makes committee and liaison assignments for council members, and most appointments are made by the mayor with the advice and consent of the council.

== Mayors ==
The individuals who have served as the borough's mayor are: Terms began January 1 and end December 31.

#	Mayor	Birth and death	Term start	Term end	Notes
1	Edward Kenny		July 3, 1895	1906	Edward Kenny was the first mayor of East Newark, New Jersey.
2	Cornelius Augustine McGlennon	(1878-1931)	1907	1919	Democratic Party politician who represented New Jersey's 8th congressional district from 1919 to 1921.
3	Thomas Keenan		1920	1921	
4	Patrick Henry Quirk	(1862-1935)	1922	1923	He was born in 1862 in Troy, New York. He died on April 4, 1935, at the home of his daughter, in Harrison, New Jersey.
5	Thomas Keenan		1924	1925	Second (non-consecutive) term
6	Thomas Walsh		1926	1927	
7	Owen Coogan		1928	1929	
8	John Reynolds		1930	1945	Served 16 consecutive terms. Died soon after re-election in 1945.
9	William Seeds		1946	1947	
10	Harry Lawson		1948	1951	
11	Harold (Harry) Francis Lawson	(1887-1968)	1952	1963	He was born on August 4, 1887, and he married Katherine Brennen. He worked as an insurance broker and lived at 545 North Third Street and also served on the East Newark town council. He died on June 23, 1968, in West Hudson Hospital in Kearny, New Jersey, at age 80.
12	Wilbert Hotaling		1964	1976	Resigned from office in February 1976
13	Raymond Graham Sr.	(d. 2018)	1977	1987	Known as "Cookie", served for over 10 years. Originally assumed office in 1976 after being appointed.
14	Joseph R. Smith		1987	2020	Held position for 8 terms, 32 years Ran unopposed in 2003, 2007, 2011, and 2015. Eight years on the borough council; lost 1983 Democratic mayoral primary; became Republican in 1987 won mayoral by 61 votes, and then switched back. One of the longest-serving mayors in the United States.
15	Dina M. Grilo		2020		First woman elected as mayor in the borough.
