= Paul J. Moore =

American firefighter and politician (1868–1938)

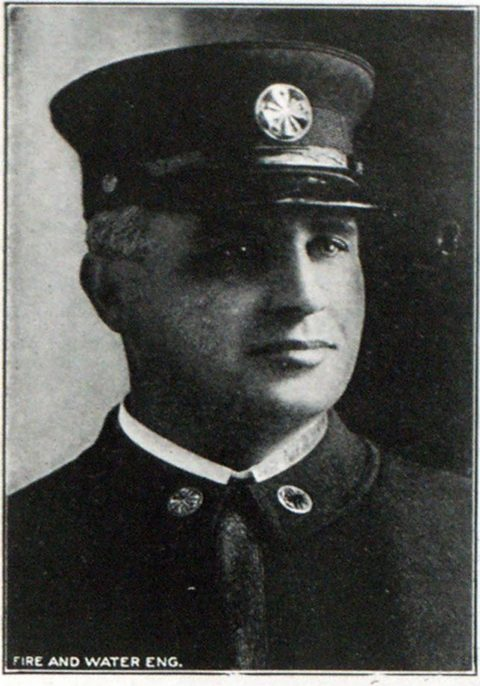
- Portrait in Fire Engineering magazine, 1938

Member of the U.S. House of Representatives from New Jersey's 8th district
- In office March 4, 1927 – March 3, 1929
- Preceded by: Herbert W. Taylor
- Succeeded by: Fred A. Hartley Jr.

Personal details
- Born: Paul John Moore; August 5, 1868 Newark, New Jersey, U.S.
- Died: January 10, 1938 (aged 69) Newark, New Jersey, U.S.
- Resting place: Holy Sepulchre Cemetery, East Orange
- Party: Democratic
- Relations: Thomas Corbally (grandson)
- Education: St. Benedict's Preparatory School

Paul John Moore (August 5, 1868 – January 10, 1938) was an American firefighter and politician who served as a member of the U.S. House of Representatives from New Jersey's 8th congressional district from 1927 to 1929.

Born in Newark, New Jersey, Moore attended public and parochial school, including St. Benedict's Preparatory School. He joined the Newark Fire Department on November 1, 1892, and was promoted through the ranks to chief engineer, serving until retirement on August 1, 1924, when he began work as a firefighting equipment salesman.

Moore was elected as a Democrat to the 70th United States Congress. He served for a single term from March 4, 1927, to March 3, 1929, and was chairman of the Essex County Democratic Committee from 1928 to 1929. Moore lost reelection in 1928 to Fred A. Hartley Jr. and failed to recover his seat in a rematch in 1930.

Upon leaving Congress, he again worked as a firefighting equipment salesman in Newark until 1931, when he retired in earnest and moved with his wife, Frances, to a home in nearby Maplewood. He died in Newark on January 10, 1938, and was interred in Holy Sepulchre Cemetery in East Orange. He was the maternal grandfather of private investigator Thomas Corbally.

== Electoral history ==
Electoral history of Paul J. Moore
Year	Office		Party	Votes			Result	Swing	Ref.
Year	Office		Party	Total	%	P.	Result	Swing	Ref.
1926	U.S. House	8th	Democratic	39,436	58.05	1st	Won	Gain	
1928	U.S. House	8th	Democratic	64,594	49.88	2nd	Lost	Gain	
1930	U.S. House	8th	Democratic	43,195	49.43	2nd	Lost	Hold	
Source: Clerk of the U.S. House | Election Statistics

U.S. House of Representatives
Preceded by Herbert W. Taylor	Member of the U.S. House of Representatives from New Jersey's 8th congressional district March 4, 1927 – March 3, 1929	Succeeded by Fred A. Hartley, Jr.
