= Anne Ryan (artist) =

American painter (1889–1954)

- Ryan in c. 1949
- Born: 1889; Hoboken, New Jersey, US
- Died: 1954 (aged 64–65); Morristown, New Jersey, US
- Known for: Collage, printmaking
- Movement: Abstract expressionism

Anne Ryan (1889–1954) was an American Abstract Expressionist artist associated with the New York School. Her first contact with the New York City avant-garde came in 1941 when she joined the Atelier 17, a famous printmaking workshop that the British artist Stanley William Hayter had established in Paris in the 1930s and then brought to New York when France fell to the Nazis. The great turning point in Ryan's development occurred after the war, in 1948. She was 57 years old when she saw the collages of Kurt Schwitters at the Rose Fried Gallery, in New York City, in 1948. She right away dedicated herself to this newly discovered medium. Since Anne Ryan was a poet, according to Deborah Solomon, in Kurt Schwitters's collages “she recognized the visual equivalent of her sonnets – discrete images packed together in an extremely compressed space.” When six years later Ryan died, her work in this medium numbered over 400 pieces.

== Biography ==
Anne Ryan was born in Hoboken, New Jersey in 1889. Both her parents died when Ryan was in her early teens, and she attended the Academy of Saint Elizabeth convent for both high school and early college. She left the school her junior year to marry attorney William McFadden; they separated in 1923. During this time she frequented art and literary circles in New York City's Greenwich Village neighborhood, and published a novel, Raquel, as well as a volume of poetry, Lost Hills. In 1931 and 1932 she lived in Mallorca and then Paris. When she returned to the United States and settled on West Fourth Street in New York City, the cultural community there was rapidly galvanizing, attracting artists and writers of all backgrounds through the Works Progress Administration and generating new styles that challenged the Regionalism and Social Realism for which the U.S. was known. She began to paint in 1938 and had her first solo exhibition in 1941 at The Pinacoteca on Lexington Avenue. After seeing Kurt Schwitters' collages shown at the Rose Fried Gallery in 1948, she was struck by "the abstract form and tactile quality, at how much power and complexity there could be on so small a scale. She seized on the idea of debris and made her first collage from paper and fabric scraps that very evening, continuing mostly in this mode until her death in 1954 in Morristown, New Jersey. She was interred at Gate of Heaven Cemetery in East Hanover, New Jersey.

Her work was included in the influential 1951 Ninth Street Show.

Her image is included in the iconic 1972 poster Some Living American Women Artists by Mary Beth Edelson.

In 2016 her biography was included in the exhibition catalogue Women of Abstract Expressionism organized by the Denver Art Museum.

== Artistic and literary work ==
For Ryan, the relationship between artmaking and writing was very permeable, though she favored the latter for most of her life. She wrote a series of poems in the late 1930s and 40s called Lines to a Young Painter, and her circle of friends included artists and writers of all kinds. Her artistic work first took the form of printmaking—she made prints with Stanley William Hayter at Atelier 17, a hub for the American and European avant-garde—followed by oil painting, and by the mid-1940s she was designing costumes and backdrops for ballet performances.

It was in collage, though, that Ryan found her primary voice. She incorporated all kinds of papers and textiles into her collage compositions, including silk, netting, handmade rag paper, and Washi paper. Most were small in scale, averaging roughly eight by six inches. Many of the works were mounted on handmade paper by Douglas Morse Howell, who frequently collaborated with New York artists in the 1950s and 60s and often made paper from re-purposed textile fibers like blue jeans, or from flax grown in his backyard. Ryan's collages distilled and expanded upon this sensibility by juxtaposing small squares of different materials against one another to highlight the distinct textures and densities of each. Their small scale and her use of pastel colors provoked varying critical responses in the early 1950s; many writers commented on the works' "feminine" qualities.

Ryan had three exhibitions of her work at the Betty Parsons Gallery in the 1950s that solidified her reputation in the art world. Parsons was well known for showing abstract artists like Barnett Newman and Agnes Martin. After her death in 1954, an exhibition of her collage was shown at the Brooklyn Museum and traveled to the National Collection of Fine Arts in Washington, DC; the Art Museum of South Texas, Corpus Christi; and the New Jersey State Museum in Trenton. Her daughter Elizabeth McFadden is also an artist.

== Public collections ==
- British Museum, London
- Brooklyn Museum of Art, New York
- Hirshhorn Museum and Sculpture Garden, Washington, D.C.
- Metropolitan Museum of Art, New York
- Museum of Fine Arts, Houston, Texas
- Museum of Modern Art, New York.
- National Gallery of Art, Washington, D.C.
- Walker Art Center, Minneapolis
- Whitney Museum of American Art, New York
- Yale University Art Gallery, New Haven, Conn.

== See also ==
- Art movement
- Action painting

== Bibliography ==
- Stuart Preston, Artists of Personal Vision, The New York Times, April 10, 1955 Section 2, p. 11
- Fairfield Porter, "Reviews and Previews," Art News, vol. 56, Dec. 1957, p. 11 - Anne Ryan, Darkest Leaf, Boteghe Oscure, vol. 22, 1958 (story published posthumously).
- Donald Windham, A note on Anne Ryan, Boteghe Oscure, vol. 22, 1958, pp. 267–271.
- Hilton Kramer, Anne Ryan: Bigness on a Small Scale, New York Times, February 3, 1968, p. 25, ills.
- John Ashberry, A Place for Everything, Art News, vol.69, March 1970, p. 32
- Carter Ratcliff, New York, Art International, vol.14, Summer 1970, p. 141
- Piri Halasz, "Trenton Exhibit Celebrates the Wonders of Collage," The New York Times, Nov 17, 1974, p. 33, B&W of Ryan

=== Books ===
- Marika Herskovic, New York School Abstract Expressionists Artists Choice by Artists, (New York School Press, 2000.) ISBN 0-9677994-0-6. p. 18; p. 38; p. 318-321
