= Gate of Heaven Cemetery (East Hanover, New Jersey) =

Cemetery

Gate Cemetery
- Interactive map of Gate Cemetery

Details
- Established: 1937
- Location: East Hanover, New Jersey, US
- Country: United States
- Coordinates: 40.816°N 74.374°W
- Type: Catholic
- Owned by: Roman Catholic Archdiocese of Newark
- Size: 128 acres (0.52 km^{2})
- No. of graves: 81,000
- Website: Gate of Heaven Cemetery

Gate of Heaven Cemetery is a cemetery located in East Hanover Township, New Jersey, United States. The cemetery is operated under the auspices of the Roman Catholic Archdiocese of Newark. It opened in 1937 and had 81,000 burials through 2002. 100 of the cemetery's original 128 acres (0.52 km^{2}) have been developed. Construction started in 1989 on Chapel Mausoleum, which was planned to include 10,000 crypts.

== Notable burials ==
- Hugh Joseph Addonizio (1914–1981), New Jersey politician.
- Yogi Berra (1925–2015), Baseball Hall of Fame New York Yankee.
- Denise Borino-Quinn (1964–2010), actress
- Ownie Carroll (1902–1975), Major League Baseball pitcher.
- James Anthony Grogan (1938–2022), Former President International Association of Heat and Frost Insulators and Allied Workers.
- The Amazing Kreskin (1935–2024), American mentalist
- Eugene Francis Kinkead (1876–1960), New Jersey politician.
- Tony Mottola (1918–2004), guitarist who played with Frank Sinatra.
- Karen Ann Quinlan (1954–1985), right to die debate figure.
- Peter W. Rodino (1909–2005), U.S. congressman.
- Anne Ryan (1889–1954), artist of the New York School of Abstract Expressionism
- Arthur Walsh (1896–1947), U.S. senator.
