= Charles N. Fowler =

American politician (1852–1932)

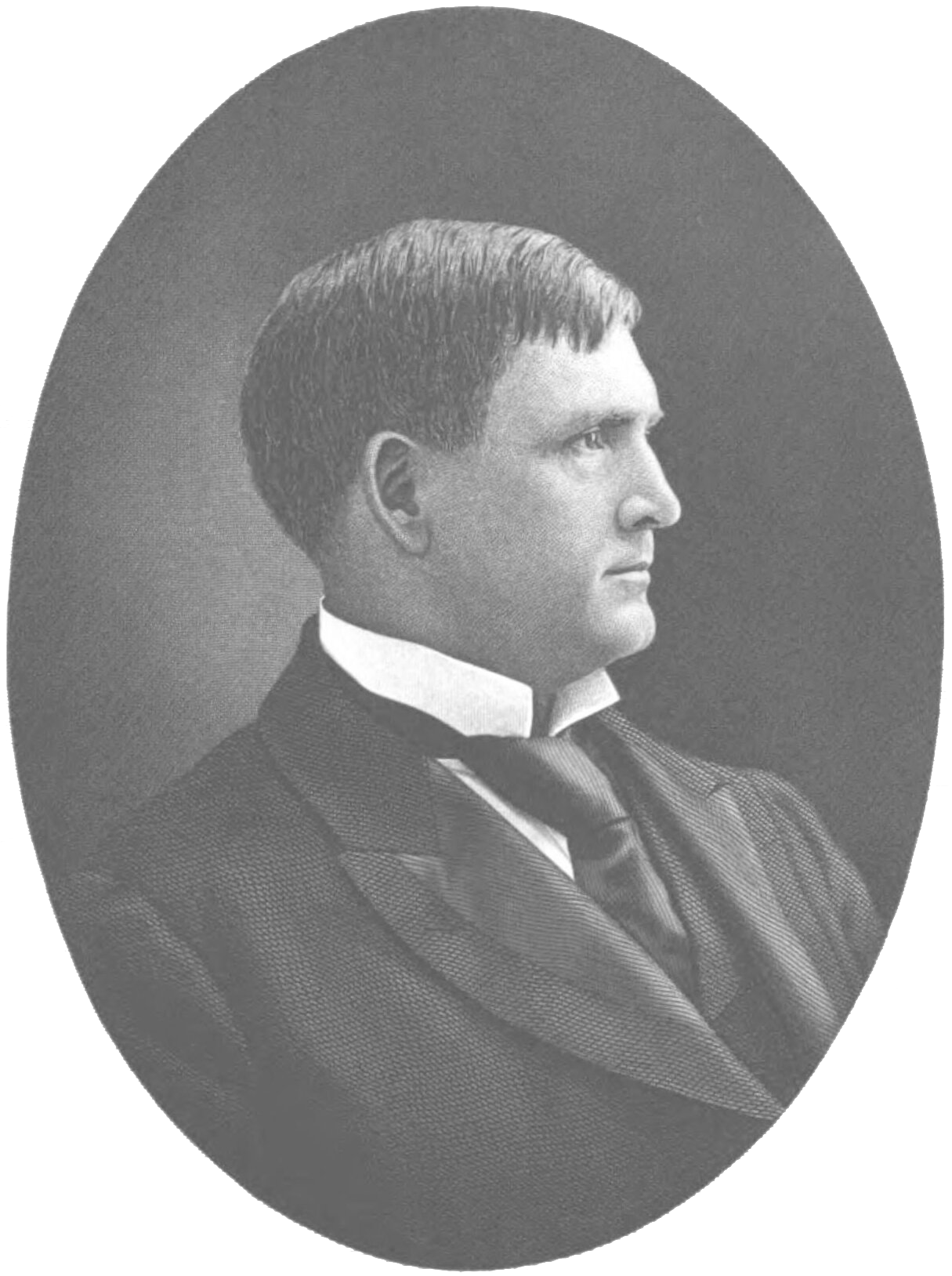
- Fowler in a 1902 publication

Member of the U.S. House of Representatives from New Jersey
- In office March 4, 1895 – March 3, 1911
- Preceded by: John T. Dunn
- Succeeded by: William E. Tuttle Jr.
- Constituency: 8th district (1895–1903); 5th district (1903–1911)

Personal details
- Born: November 2, 1852 Lena, Illinois, U.S.
- Died: May 27, 1932 (aged 79) Orange, New Jersey, U.S.
- Party: Republican
- Spouse: Hilda S. Heg (m. 1879)
- Children: 1
- Education: Beloit College; Yale College; University of Chicago Law School
- Occupation: Politician; lawyer
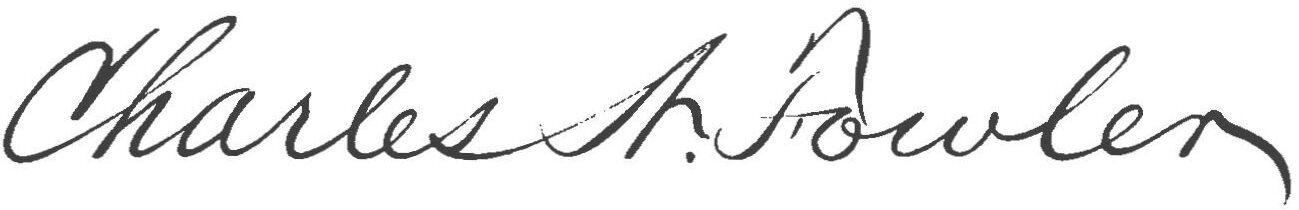
- Signature

Charles Newell Fowler Sr. (November 2, 1852 – May 27, 1932) was an American lawyer and Republican Party politician who represented New Jersey in the United States House of Representatives from 1895 to 1911.

== Early life ==
Charles Newell Fowler was born on November 2, 1852, in Lena, Illinois. He attended the public schools in Lena and Beloit College. He graduated from Yale College in 1876 where he was a member of Skull and Bones. He was a member of Yale Crew. He then taught school and graduated from the University of Chicago Law School in 1878. He was admitted to the bar in 1878.

== Early career ==
Fowler commenced the practice of law in Beloit, Kansas. Fowler moved to Cranford, New Jersey, in 1883 and to Elizabeth, New Jersey, in 1891. He engaged in banking, serving as president of a mortgage company.

== Political career ==
Fowler was a Republican. He was chairman of the Republican city committee of Elizabeth for a number of years. He was a member of the Republican State Committee from 1898 to 1907.

Fowler was elected to represent New Jersey's 8th congressional district as a Republican to the Fifty-fourth and to the seven succeeding Congresses, serving in office from March 4, 1895, to March 3, 1911. Fowler's district centered on his native Union County, New Jersey. From 1895 to 1903, his district also included Bayonne and most of Essex County. From 1903 to 1911, the district was redrawn to instead include Morris and Warren counties. He was chairman of the committee on banking and currency (Fifty-seventh through Sixtieth Congresses). He was an unsuccessful candidate for nomination for election to the United States Senate in 1910. He narrowly lost the Republican nomination to Governor Edward C. Stokes in the state's first direct primary election. He lost a second match with Stokes by a much wider margin in the 1913 gubernatorial primary.

Fowler was a leader at the 1897 monetary convention in Indianapolis. He debated in favor of paper money against fiat money with Andrew Jackson Warner at the 1898 Omaha Convention. He drafted a general financial bill known as the "Fowler Bill". He was a member of the committee on foreign affairs and wrote a bill to establish a tariff commission.

== Later career ==
After leaving Congress, he resumed banking activities at Elizabeth. He also engaged in literary pursuits and operated a group of marble quarries in Vermont. He was president of the Pingry School in Elizabeth.

== Personal life ==
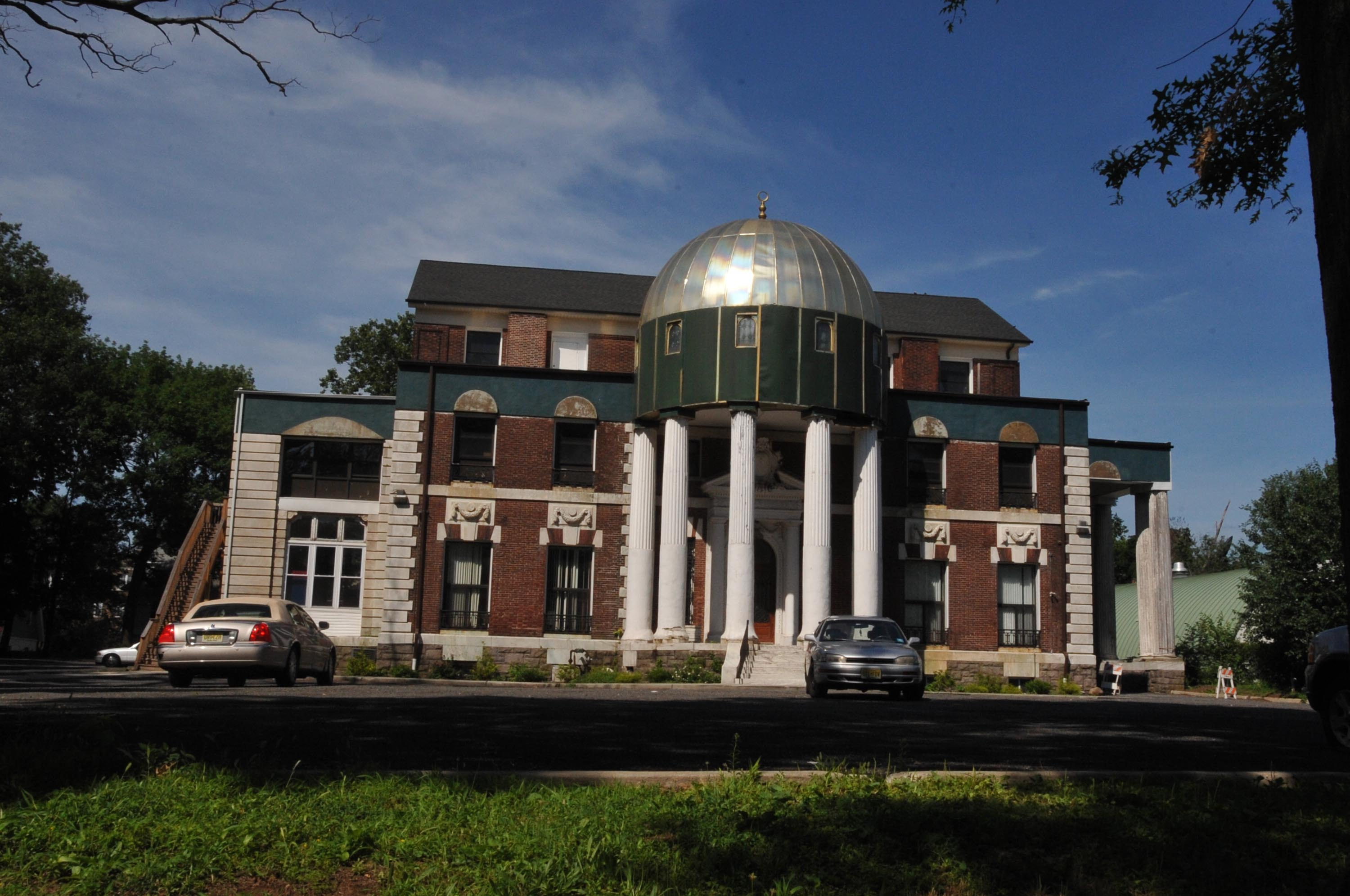
Charles N. Fowler House in Elizabeth, New Jersey

Fowler married Hilda S. Heg, daughter of Hans Christian Heg, in 1879. They had a son, Charles N. Jr. In 1930, he moved to Orange, New Jersey.

Fowler died on May 27, 1932. He was interred in Fairview Cemetery in Westfield, New Jersey.

His home in Elizabeth is listed on the National Register of Historic Places.

U.S. House of Representatives
Preceded by John T. Dunn	Member of the U.S. House of Representatives from New Jersey's 8th congressional district March 4, 1895 – March 3, 1903	Succeeded by William H. Wiley
Preceded by James F. Stewart	Member of the U.S. House of Representatives from New Jersey's 5th congressional district March 4, 1903 – March 3, 1911	Succeeded by William E. Tuttle Jr.
