= Frank Joseph McNulty =

American politician (1872–1926)

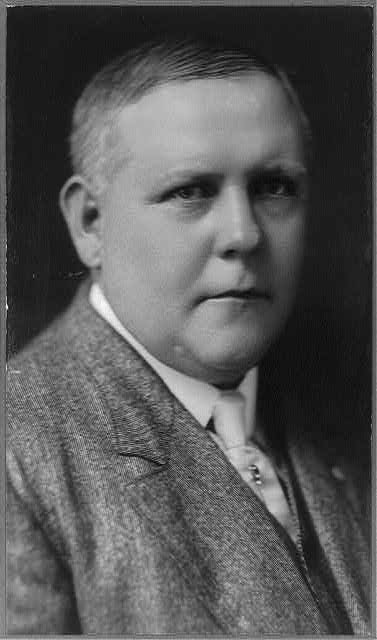

Member of the U.S. House of Representatives from New Jersey's 8th district
- In office March 4, 1923 – March 3, 1925
- Preceded by: Herbert W. Taylor
- Succeeded by: Herbert W. Taylor

Personal details
- Born: August 10, 1872 County Londonderry, Ireland
- Died: May 26, 1926 (aged 53) Newark, New Jersey
- Party: Democratic

Frank Joseph McNulty (August 10, 1872 – May 26, 1926) was a one-term Democratic U.S. Representative from New Jersey.

McNulty was born in County Londonderry, Ireland, but immigrated to the United States with his parents in 1876. The family settled in New York City. He was the son of the also Derry born Union Army officer Lt. Owen McNulty, who commanded before his son's immigration in their newly adopted country's Irish Brigade (U.S.) and whose command was renowned for its discipline under fire.

From 1903 to 1918, Frank Joseph McNulty served as President of the International Brotherhood of Electrical Workers. He also served as a member of a commission that studied the municipal ownership of utilities in Great Britain. During World War I, he served as a member of a board of adjustment to resolve labor-management disputes in the railroad industry without work stoppages. From 1917 to 1921, he served as Deputy Director of Public Safety of Newark, New Jersey.

In 1922, Frank Joseph McNulty was elected as a Democrat to the Sixty-Eighth Congress. He served a single term from March 4, 1923 to March 3, 1925 and was defeated for reelection in 1924. He returned to his former business activities, but died one year after leaving office. Frank Joseph McNulty is buried in the Holy Sepulchre Cemetery in East Orange.

U.S. House of Representatives
Preceded by Herbert W. Taylor	Member of the U.S. House of Representatives from New Jersey's 8th congressional district March 4, 1923 – March 3, 1925	Succeeded by Herbert W. Taylor
Trade union offices
Preceded by W. A. Jackson	President of the International Brotherhood of Electrical Workers; 1903–1918	Succeeded by James P. Noonan
