= New Jersey's 8th congressional district =

U.S. House district for New Jersey

Coordinates: 40.88°N 74.25°W

- Interactive map of district boundaries since January 3, 2023
- Representative: Rob Menendez; D–Jersey City
- Distribution: 100.00% urban; 0.00% rural
- Population (2025): 782,787
- Median household income: $91,819
- Ethnicity: 51.0% Hispanic; 24.9% White; 11.8% Asian; 7.8% Black; 2.8% Two or more races; 1.7% other
- Cook PVI: D+15

New Jersey's 8th congressional district is a congressional district in New Jersey. It is situated along the New York City border and includes most of Hudson County, Jersey City, Newark and Elizabeth. It is the only majority-Hispanic district in the state and the second-most Democratic.

Democrat Rob Menendez has represented the district since January 2023.

== Counties and municipalities in the district ==
For the 118th and successive Congresses (based on redistricting following the 2020 census), the district contains all or portions of three counties and 13 municipalities.

Essex County (1):

Newark (part; also 10th)

Hudson County (11):

Bayonne, East Newark, Guttenberg, Harrison, Hoboken, Jersey City (part; also 10th), Kearny (part; also 9th), North Bergen, Union City, Weehawken, West New York

Union County (1):

Elizabeth

== Recent election results from statewide races ==
Year	Office	Results
2008	President	Obama 73% - 26%
2012	President	Obama 79% - 21%
2016	President	Clinton 76% - 21%
2017	Governor	Murphy 81% - 17%
2018	Senate	Menendez 77% - 20%
2020	President	Biden 72% - 27%
2020	Senate	Booker 74% - 24%
2021	Governor	Murphy 74% - 25%
2024	President	Harris 61% - 37%
2024	Senate	Kim 64% - 33%
2025	Governor	Sherrill 75% - 24%

== List of members representing the district ==
Member (District Home)	Party	Years	Cong ress	Electoral history	Counties/Towns
District established March 4, 1893
John T. Dunn (Elizabeth)	Democratic	March 4, 1893 – March 3, 1895	53rd	Elected in 1892. Lost re-election.	1893–1895; Union and parts of Essex (East Orange, Irvington, Maplewood, Millburn, South Orange, and parts of Newark) and Hudson (Bayonne)
Charles N. Fowler (Elizabeth)	Republican	March 4, 1895 – March 3, 1903	54th 55th 56th 57th	Elected in 1894. Re-elected in 1896. Re-elected in 1898. Re-elected in 1900. Redistricted to the 5th district.	1895–1903; Union, Essex (except East Orange and parts of Newark), and parts of Hudson (Bayonne)
William H. Wiley (East Orange)	Republican	March 4, 1903 – March 3, 1907	58th 59th	Elected in 1902. Re-elected in 1904. Lost re-election.	1903–1913; Parts of Essex (East Orange, Irvington, Maplewood, Millburn, Newark and South Orange)
Le Gage Pratt (East Orange)	Democratic	March 4, 1907 – March 3, 1909	60th	Elected in 1906. Lost re-election.	1903–1913; Parts of Essex (East Orange, Irvington, Maplewood, Millburn, Newark and South Orange)
William H. Wiley (East Orange)	Republican	March 4, 1909 – March 3, 1911	61st	Elected in 1908. Lost re-election.	1903–1913; Parts of Essex (East Orange, Irvington, Maplewood, Millburn, Newark and South Orange)
Walter I. McCoy (South Orange)	Democratic	March 4, 1911 – March 3, 1913	62nd	Elected in 1910. Redistricted to the 9th district.	1903–1913; Parts of Essex (East Orange, Irvington, Maplewood, Millburn, Newark and South Orange)
Eugene F. Kinkead (Jersey City)	Democratic	March 4, 1913 – February 4, 1915	63rd	Redistricted from the 9th district and re-elected in 1912. Retired and resigned to become Sheriff of Hudson County	1903–1933; Parts of Essex and Hudson (Bayonne, East Newark, Harrison, Kearney)
Vacant		February 4, 1915 – March 3, 1915	63rd		1903–1933; Parts of Essex and Hudson (Bayonne, East Newark, Harrison, Kearney)
Edward W. Gray (Newark)	Republican	March 4, 1915 – March 3, 1919	64th 65th	Elected in 1914. Re-elected in 1916. Lost re-election.	1903–1933; Parts of Essex and Hudson (Bayonne, East Newark, Harrison, Kearney)
Cornelius A. McGlennon (East Newark)	Democratic	March 4, 1919 – March 3, 1921	66th	Elected in 1918. Lost re-election.	1903–1933; Parts of Essex and Hudson (Bayonne, East Newark, Harrison, Kearney)
Herbert W. Taylor (Newark)	Republican	March 4, 1921 – March 3, 1923	67th	Elected in 1920. Lost renomination.	1903–1933; Parts of Essex and Hudson (Bayonne, East Newark, Harrison, Kearney)
Frank J. McNulty (Newark)	Democratic	March 4, 1923 – March 3, 1925	68th	Elected in 1922. Lost re-election.	1903–1933; Parts of Essex and Hudson (Bayonne, East Newark, Harrison, Kearney)
Herbert W. Taylor (Newark)	Republican	March 4, 1925 – March 3, 1927	69th	Elected in 1924. Lost re-election.	1903–1933; Parts of Essex and Hudson (Bayonne, East Newark, Harrison, Kearney)
Paul J. Moore (Newark)	Democratic	March 4, 1927 – March 3, 1929	70th	Elected in 1926. Lost re-election.	1903–1933; Parts of Essex and Hudson (Bayonne, East Newark, Harrison, Kearney)
Fred A. Hartley Jr. (Kearny)	Republican	March 4, 1929 – March 3, 1933	71st 72nd	Elected in 1928. Re-elected in 1930. Redistricted to the 10th district.	1903–1933; Parts of Essex and Hudson (Bayonne, East Newark, Harrison, Kearney)
George N. Seger (Passaic)	Republican	March 4, 1933 – August 26, 1940	73rd 74th 75th 76th	Redistricted from the 7th district and re-elected in 1932. Re-elected in 1934. Re-elected in 1936. Re-elected in 1938. Died.	1933–1963; Passaic (except Ringwood and West Milford)
Vacant		August 26, 1940 – January 3, 1941	76th		1933–1963; Passaic (except Ringwood and West Milford)
Gordon Canfield (Paterson)	Republican	January 3, 1941 – January 3, 1961	77th 78th 79th 80th 81st 82nd 83rd 84th 85th 86th	Elected in 1940. Re-elected in 1942. Re-elected in 1944. Re-elected in 1946. Re-elected in 1948. Re-elected in 1950. Re-elected in 1952. Re-elected in 1954. Re-elected in 1956. Re-elected in 1958. Retired.	1933–1963; Passaic (except Ringwood and West Milford)
Charles S. Joelson (Paterson)	Democratic	January 3, 1961 – September 4, 1969	87th 88th 89th 90th 91st	Elected in 1960. Re-elected in 1962. Re-elected in 1964. Re-elected in 1966. Re-elected in 1968. Resigned to become judge of Superior Court of New Jersey.	1933–1963; Passaic (except Ringwood and West Milford)
Charles S. Joelson (Paterson)	Democratic	January 3, 1961 – September 4, 1969	87th 88th 89th 90th 91st	Elected in 1960. Re-elected in 1962. Re-elected in 1964. Re-elected in 1966. Re-elected in 1968. Resigned to become judge of Superior Court of New Jersey.	1963–1973; Passaic
Vacant		September 4, 1969 – November 4, 1969	91st		1963–1973; Passaic
Robert A. Roe (Wayne)	Democratic	November 4, 1969 – January 3, 1993	91st 92nd 93rd 94th 95th 96th 97th 98th 99th 100th 101st 102nd	Elected to finish Joelson's term. Re-elected in 1970. Re-elected in 1972. Re-elected in 1974. Re-elected in 1976. Re-elected in 1978. Re-elected in 1980. Re-elected in 1982. Re-elected in 1984. Re-elected in 1986. Re-elected in 1988. Re-elected in 1990. Retired.	1963–1973; Passaic
Robert A. Roe (Wayne)	Democratic	November 4, 1969 – January 3, 1993	91st 92nd 93rd 94th 95th 96th 97th 98th 99th 100th 101st 102nd	Elected to finish Joelson's term. Re-elected in 1970. Re-elected in 1972. Re-elected in 1974. Re-elected in 1976. Re-elected in 1978. Re-elected in 1980. Re-elected in 1982. Re-elected in 1984. Re-elected in 1986. Re-elected in 1988. Re-elected in 1990. Retired.	1973–1983; Passaic (except Little Falls and West Paterson)
Robert A. Roe (Wayne)	Democratic	November 4, 1969 – January 3, 1993	91st 92nd 93rd 94th 95th 96th 97th 98th 99th 100th 101st 102nd	Elected to finish Joelson's term. Re-elected in 1970. Re-elected in 1972. Re-elected in 1974. Re-elected in 1976. Re-elected in 1978. Re-elected in 1980. Re-elected in 1982. Re-elected in 1984. Re-elected in 1986. Re-elected in 1988. Re-elected in 1990. Retired.	1973–1985 parts of Bergen, Morris, and Passaic
Robert A. Roe (Wayne)	Democratic	November 4, 1969 – January 3, 1993	91st 92nd 93rd 94th 95th 96th 97th 98th 99th 100th 101st 102nd	Elected to finish Joelson's term. Re-elected in 1970. Re-elected in 1972. Re-elected in 1974. Re-elected in 1976. Re-elected in 1978. Re-elected in 1980. Re-elected in 1982. Re-elected in 1984. Re-elected in 1986. Re-elected in 1988. Re-elected in 1990. Retired.	1985–1993 southern Passaic and parts of Bergen, Essex, and Morris
Herb Klein (Clifton)	Democratic	January 3, 1993 – January 3, 1995	103rd	Elected in 1992. Lost re-election.	1993–2003 southern Passaic and parts of Essex
Bill Martini (Cedar Grove)	Republican	January 3, 1995 – January 3, 1997	104th	Elected in 1994. Lost re-election.	1993–2003 southern Passaic and parts of Essex
Bill Pascrell (Paterson)	Democratic	January 3, 1997 – January 3, 2013	105th 106th 107th 108th 109th 110th 111th 112th	Elected in 1996. Re-elected in 1998. Re-elected in 2000. Re-elected in 2002. Re-elected in 2004. Re-elected in 2006. Re-elected in 2008. Re-elected in 2010. Redistricted to the 9th district.	1993–2003 southern Passaic and parts of Essex
Bill Pascrell (Paterson)	Democratic	January 3, 1997 – January 3, 2013	105th 106th 107th 108th 109th 110th 111th 112th	Elected in 1996. Re-elected in 1998. Re-elected in 2000. Re-elected in 2002. Re-elected in 2004. Re-elected in 2006. Re-elected in 2008. Re-elected in 2010. Redistricted to the 9th district.	2003–2013 southern Passaic and parts of Essex
Albio Sires (West New York)	Democratic	January 3, 2013 – January 3, 2023	113th 114th 115th 116th 117th	Redistricted from the 13th district and re-elected in 2012. Re-elected in 2014. Re-elected in 2016. Re-elected in 2018. Re-elected in 2020. Retired.	2013–2023 parts of Bergen (Fairview), Essex (Belleville and part of Newark), Hudson, and Union (Elizabeth)
Rob Menendez (Jersey City)	Democratic	January 3, 2023 – present	118th 119th	Elected in 2022. Re-elected in 2024. Re-elected in 2026.	2023–present parts of Essex (part of Newark), Hudson, and Union (Elizabeth)

== Recent election results ==
=== 2012 ===
New Jersey's 8th congressional district, 2012
Party	Candidate	Votes	%
Democratic	Albio Sires (incumbent)	130,857	78.8
Republican	Maria Karczewski	31,767	19.1
Independent	Herbert Shaw	1,841	1.1
Independent	Stephen Deluca	1,710	1.0
Total votes		166,175	100.0
Democratic hold			

=== 2014 ===
New Jersey's 8th congressional district, 2014
Party	Candidate	Votes	%
Democratic	Albio Sires (incumbent)	61,510	77.4
Republican	Jude Anthony Tiscornia	15,141	19.0
Independent	Herbert H. Shaw	1,192	1.5
Independent	Pablo Olivera	1,022	1.3
Independent	Robert Thorne	653	0.8
Total votes		79,518	100.0
Democratic hold			

=== 2016 ===
New Jersey's 8th congressional district, 2016
Party	Candidate	Votes	%
Democratic	Albio Sires (incumbent)	134,733	77.0
Republican	Agha Khan	32,337	18.5
Independent	Pablo Olivera	4,381	2.5
Libertarian	Dan Delaney	3,438	2.0
Total votes		174,889	100.0
Democratic hold			

=== 2018 ===
New Jersey's 8th congressional district, 2018
Party	Candidate	Votes	%
Democratic	Albio Sires (incumbent)	119,881	78.1
Republican	John R. Muniz	28,752	18.7
Independent	Mahmoud Mahmoud	3,658	2.4
Libertarian	Dan Delaney	1,191	0.8
Total votes		153,455	100.0
Democratic hold			

=== 2020 ===
New Jersey's 8th congressional district, 2020
Party	Candidate	Votes	%
Democratic	Albio Sires (incumbent)	176,758	74.0
Republican	Jason Mushnick	58,686	24.6
Libertarian	Dan Delaney	3,329	1.4
Total votes		238,773	100.0
Democratic hold			

=== 2022 ===
New Jersey's 8th congressional district, 2022
Party	Candidate	Votes	%
Democratic	Rob Menendez	70,837	72.9
Republican	Marcos Arroyo	23,540	24.2
Socialist Workers	Joanne Kuniansky	894	0.9
Libertarian	Dan Delaney	687	0.7
Independent	David Cook	647	0.7
Independent	Pablo Olivera	361	0.4
Independent	John Salierno	226	0.2
Total votes		97,192	100.0
Democratic hold			

=== 2024 ===
New Jersey's 8th congressional district, 2024
Party	Candidate	Votes	%
Democratic	Rob Menendez (Incumbent)	116,434	59.2
Republican	Anthony Valdes	68,152	34.6
Green	Christian J. Robbins	5,465	2.8
Independent	Pablo R. Olivera	4,295	2.2
Socialist Workers	Lea Sherman	2,419	1.2
Total votes		196,765	100.0
Democratic hold			
