= Clark Thread Company Historic District =

Historic district in New Jersey, United States

- U.S. National Register of Historic Places
- U.S. National Historic Landmark District
- New Jersey Register of Historic Places
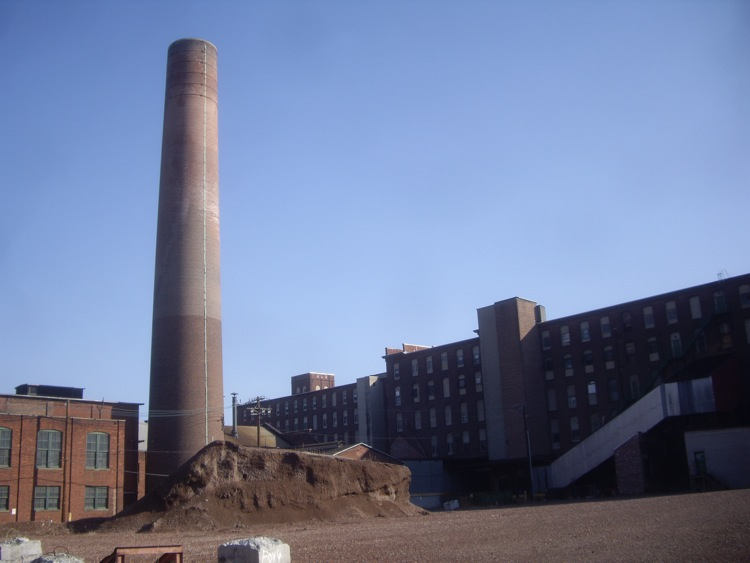

- Location within Hudson County, New Jersey Location within New Jersey Location within the United States
- Location: 900 Passaic Avenue, East Newark, New Jersey, USA
- Coordinates: 40°45′7″N 74°9′45″W
- Area: 13 acres (5.3 ha)
- Built: 1875
- NRHP reference No.: 78001764
- NJRHP No.: 1455

Significant dates
- Added to NRHP: June 2, 1978
- Designated NHLD: June 2, 1978
- Designated NJRHP: June 2, 1978

The Clark Thread Company Historic District, located at 900 Passaic Avenue, East Newark, Hudson County, New Jersey, United States, is a large mill complex. Begun in 1875, it was a major manufacturing site of the Clark Thread Company, the world's leading manufacturer of sewing thread, until 1935. The complex was designated a National Historic Landmark District in 1978 for this association. It now functions as an industrial park housing a diversity of businesses.

== Description and history ==
The former Clark Thread Company facilities lie overlooking the Passaic River in East Newark, covering an area of about 13 acres (5.3 ha) bounded by Passaic, Grant, and Central Avenues, and a railroad right-of-way that parallels Johnston Avenue. There are 35 buildings on the site, built between 1875 and 1910. Most are of brick construction, the most prominent ones being large four-story mills with rows of segmented-arch windows.

The Clark Company was founded in 1864 by George and William Clark, the sons of Scottish thread manufacturer James Clark, who acted as agents for their father's firm. First located in nearby Newark, the Clark firm expanded into East Newark in 1875. The company became famous for its thread, which was specifically developed to work well with then-new sewing machines. It was the largest threadmaker in the nation by 1873, and doubled in size by William Clark's death in 1897, when it merged with competitor J&P Coats. Coats and its successors continued to operate on this site until the 1930s, when they began moving production to the American South. The site is now used by a variety of industrial companies.

In 1888, Scientific American recognized Clark Thread Works to have the highest chimney in the United States at 335 ft.

== See also ==
- Conant Thread-Coats & Clark Mill Complex District, a former Coats & Clark mill complex in Rhode Island
- List of National Historic Landmarks in New Jersey
- National Register of Historic Places listings in Hudson County, New Jersey
