= List of former United States representatives (F) =

This is a complete list of former United States representatives whose last names begin with the letter F.

== Number of years and terms the member has served ==
The number of years the representative/delegate has served in Congress indicates the number of terms the representative/delegate has. Note the representative/delegate can also serve non-consecutive terms if the representative/delegate loses election and wins re-election to the House.

- 2 years - 1 or 2 terms
- 4 years - 2 or 3 terms
- 6 years - 3 or 4 terms
- 8 years - 4 or 5 terms
- 10 years - 5 or 6 terms
- 12 years - 6 or 7 terms
- 14 years - 7 or 8 terms
- 16 years - 8 or 9 terms
- 18 years - 9 or 10 terms
- 20 years - 10 or 11 terms
- 22 years - 11 or 12 terms
- 24 years - 12 or 13 terms
- 26 years - 13 or 14 terms
- 28 years - 14 or 15 terms
- 30 years - 15 or 16 terms
- 32 years - 16 or 17 terms
- 34 years - 17 or 18 terms
- 36 years - 18 or 19 terms
- 38 years - 19 or 20 terms
- 40 years - 20 or 21 terms
- 42 years - 21 or 22 terms
- 44 years - 22 or 23 terms
- 46 years - 23 or 24 terms
- 48 years - 24 or 25 terms
- 50 years - 25 or 26 terms
- 52 years - 26 or 27 terms
- 54 years - 27 or 28 terms
- 56 years - 28 or 29 terms
- 58 years - 29 or 30 terms

Name	Term	State/ Territory	Party	Lifespan
Charles I. Faddis	1933–1942	Pennsylvania	Democratic	1890–1972
Benjamin L. Fairchild	1895–1897; 1917–1919; 1921–1923; 1923–1927	New York	Republican	1863–1946
George W. Fairchild	1907–1919	New York	Republican	1854–1924
John Fairfield	1835–1838	Maine	Democratic	1797–1847
Louis W. Fairfield	1917–1925	Indiana	Republican	1858–1930
John M. Faison	1911–1915	North Carolina	Democratic	1862–1915
Jacob Falconer	1913–1915	Washington	Progressive	1869–1928
Eni Faleomavaega	1989–2015	American Samoa	Democratic	1943–2017
Mary Fallin	2007–2011	Oklahoma	Republican	1954–present
George Fallon	1945–1971	Maryland	Democratic	1902–1980
James J. Faran	1845–1849	Ohio	Democratic	1808–1892
Leonard Farbstein	1957–1971	New York	Democratic	1902–1993
Blake Farenthold	2011–2018	Texas	Republican	1961–2025
George W. Faris	1895–1901	Indiana	Republican	1854–1914
Isaac G. Farlee	1843–1845	New Jersey	Democratic	1787–1855
E. Wilder Farley	1853–1855	Maine	Whig	1817–1880
James I. Farley	1933–1939	Indiana	Democratic	1871–1948
Michael F. Farley	1915–1917	New York	Democratic	1863–1921
Dudley Farlin	1835–1837	New York	Democratic	1777–1837
Charles R. Farnsley	1965–1967	Kentucky	Democratic	1907–1990
John F. Farnsworth	1857–1861; 1863–1873	Illinois	Republican	1820–1897
Billie S. Farnum	1965–1967	Michigan	Democratic	1916–1979
John H. Farquhar	1865–1867	Indiana	Republican	1818–1873
John M. Farquhar	1885–1891	New York	Republican	1832–1918
Evarts W. Farr	1879–1880	New Hampshire	Republican	1840–1880
John R. Farr	1911–1919; 1921	Pennsylvania	Republican	1857–1933
Sam Farr	1993–2017	California	Democratic	1941–present
John W. Farrelly	1847–1849	Pennsylvania	Whig	1809–1860
Patrick Farrelly	1821–1825	Pennsylvania	Democratic-Republican	1770–1826
Patrick Farrelly	1825–1826	Pennsylvania	Democratic	1770–1826
James Farrington	1837–1839	New Hampshire	Democratic	1791–1859
Joseph R. Farrington	1943–1954	Hawaii	Republican	1897–1954
Elizabeth P. Farrington	1954–1957	Hawaii	Republican	1898–1984
Samuel Farrow	1813–1815	South Carolina	Democratic-Republican	1759–1824
Charles B. Farwell	1871–1876; 1881–1883	Illinois	Republican	1823–1903
Sewall S. Farwell	1881–1883	Iowa	Republican	1834–1909
John G. Fary	1975–1983	Illinois	Democratic	1911–1984
Dante Fascell	1955–1993	Florida	Democratic	1917–1998
John Faso	2017–2019	New York	Republican	1952–present
Jacob Sloat Fassett	1905–1911	New York	Republican	1853–1924
Chaka Fattah	1995–2016	Pennsylvania	Democratic	1956–present
Charles J. Faulkner	1851–1853	Virginia	Whig	1806–1884
Charles J. Faulkner	1853–1859	Virginia	Democratic	1806–1884
Charles J. Faulkner	1875–1877	West Virginia	Democratic	1806–1884
Walter Fauntroy	1971–1991	District of Columbia	Democratic	1933–present
Charles L. Faust	1921–1928	Missouri	Republican	1879–1928
George K. Favrot	1907–1909; 1921–1925	Louisiana	Democratic	1868–1934
Harris Fawell	1985–1999	Illinois	Republican	1929–2021
Francis B. Fay	1852–1853	Massachusetts	Whig	1793–1876
James H. Fay	1939–1941; 1943–1945	New York	Democratic	1899–1948
John Fay	1819–1821	New York	Democratic-Republican	1773–1855
Vic Fazio	1979–1999	California	Democratic	1942–2022
Paul Fearing	1801–1803	Northwest	Federalist	1762–1822
Winfield S. Featherston	1847–1851	Mississippi	Democratic	1820–1891
Lewis P. Featherstone	1890–1891	Arkansas	Laborite	1851–1922
John J. Feely	1901–1903	Illinois	Democratic	1875–1905
Tom Feeney	2003–2009	Florida	Republican	1958–present
Ed Feighan	1983–1993	Ohio	Democratic	1947–present
Michael A. Feighan	1943–1971	Ohio	Democratic	1905–1992
John Myers Felder	1831–1833	South Carolina	Democratic	1782–1851
John Myers Felder	1833–1835	South Carolina	Nullifier	1782–1851
Frank Fellows	1941–1951	Maine	Republican	1889–1951
John R. Fellows	1891–1893	New York	Democratic	1832–1896
Charles N. Felton	1885–1889	California	Republican	1832–1914
William Harrell Felton	1875–1881	Georgia	Independent Democrat	1823–1909
Clare G. Fenerty	1935–1937	Pennsylvania	Republican	1895–1952
E. Hart Fenn	1921–1931	Connecticut	Republican	1856–1939
Stephen S. Fenn	1876–1879	Idaho	Democratic	1820–1892
Ivor D. Fenton	1939–1963	Pennsylvania	Republican	1889–1986
Lucien J. Fenton	1895–1899	Ohio	Republican	1844–1922
Reuben Fenton	1853–1855	New York	Democratic	1819–1885
Reuben Fenton	1857–1864	New York	Republican	1819–1885
Millicent Fenwick	1975–1983	New Jersey	Republican	1910–1992
John W. Ferdon	1879–1881	New York	Republican	1826–1884
Drew Ferguson	2017–2025	Georgia	Republican	1966–present
Fenner Ferguson	1857–1859	Nebraska	Democratic	1814–1859
Mike Ferguson	2001–2009	New Jersey	Republican	1970–present
Phil Ferguson	1935–1941	Oklahoma	Democratic	1903–1978
Harvey B. Fergusson	1897–1899; 1912–1915	New Mexico	Democratic	1848–1915
Antonio M. Fernández	1943–1956	New Mexico	Democratic	1902–1956
Joachim O. Fernández	1931–1941	Louisiana	Democratic	1896–1978
Antonio Fernós-Isern	1946–1965	Puerto Rico	Democratic	1895–1974
Geraldine Ferraro	1979–1985	New York	Democratic	1935–2011
Thomas M. Ferrell	1883–1885	New Jersey	Democratic	1844–1916
Charles G. Ferris	1834–1835; 1841–1843	New York	Democratic	c. 1796–1848
Scott Ferris	1907–1921	Oklahoma	Democratic	1877–1945
Orange Ferriss	1867–1871	New York	Republican	1814–1894
Orris S. Ferry	1859–1861	Connecticut	Republican	1823–1875
Thomas W. Ferry	1865–1871	Michigan	Republican	1827–1896
Simeon D. Fess	1913–1923	Ohio	Republican	1861–1936
Samuel C. Fessenden	1861–1863	Maine	Republican	1815–1882
T. A. D. Fessenden	1862–1863	Maine	Republican	1826–1868
William P. Fessenden	1841–1843	Maine	Whig	1806–1869
Orlando B. Ficklin	1843–1849; 1851–1853	Illinois	Democratic	1808–1886
Bobbi Fiedler	1981–1987	California	Republican	1937–2019
William H. F. Fiedler	1883–1885	New Jersey	Democratic	1847–1919
David Dudley Field II	1877	New York	Democratic	1805–1894
Moses W. Field	1873–1875	Michigan	Republican	1828–1889
Scott Field	1903–1907	Texas	Democratic	1847–1931
Walbridge A. Field	1877–1878; 1879–1881	Massachusetts	Republican	1833–1899
George B. Fielder	1893–1895	New Jersey	Democratic	1842–1906
Jack Fields	1981–1997	Texas	Republican	1952–present
William C. Fields	1867–1869	New York	Republican	1804–1882
William J. Fields	1911–1923	Kentucky	Democratic	1874–1954
William L. Fiesinger	1931–1937	Ohio	Democratic	1877–1953
Millard Fillmore	1833–1835; 1837–1843	New York	Whig	1800–1874
Bob Filner	1993–2012	California	Democratic	1942–2025
Isaac Finch	1829–1831	New York	National Republican	1783–1845
Stephen Fincher	2011–2017	Tennessee	Republican	1973–present
William E. Finck	1863–1867; 1874–1875	Ohio	Democratic	1822–1901
James Findlay	1825–1833	Ohio	Democratic	1770–1835
John Findlay	1821–1825	Pennsylvania	Democratic-Republican	1766–1838
John Findlay	1825–1827	Pennsylvania	Democratic	1766–1838
John Van Lear Findlay	1883–1887	Maryland	Democratic	1839–1907
Paul Findley	1961–1983	Illinois	Republican	1921–2019
William Findley	1791–1795	Pennsylvania	Anti-Administration	c. 1741–1821
William Findley	1795–1799; 1803–1817	Pennsylvania	Democratic-Republican	c. 1741–1821
John Fine	1839–1841	New York	Democratic	1794–1867
Sidney A. Fine	1951–1956	New York	Democratic	1903–1982
John F. Finerty	1883–1885	Illinois	Independent Democrat	1846–1908
Eric Fingerhut	1993–1995	Ohio	Democratic	1959–present
Gustavus A. Finkelnburg	1869–1871	Missouri	Republican	1837–1908
Gustavus A. Finkelnburg	1871–1873	Missouri	Liberal Republican	1837–1908
Abby Finkenauer	2019–2021	Iowa	Democratic	1988–present
Charles Finley	1930–1933	Kentucky	Republican	1865–1941
David E. Finley	1899–1917	South Carolina	Democratic	1861–1917
Ebenezer B. Finley	1877–1881	Ohio	Democratic	1833–1916
Hugh F. Finley	1887–1891	Kentucky	Republican	1833–1909
Jesse J. Finley	1876–1877; 1879; 1881–1882	Florida	Democratic	1812–1904
Edward R. Finnegan	1961–1964	Illinois	Democratic	1905–1971
Darwin A. Finney	1867–1868	Pennsylvania	Republican	1814–1868
Paul A. Fino	1953–1968	New York	Republican	1913–2009
Israel F. Fischer	1895–1899	New York	Republican	1858–1940
Hamilton Fish	1843–1845	New York	Whig	1808–1893
Hamilton Fish II	1909–1911	New York	Republican	1849–1936
Hamilton Fish III	1920–1945	New York	Republican	1888–1991
Hamilton Fish IV	1969–1995	New York	Republican	1926–1996
John W. Fishburne	1931–1933	Virginia	Democratic	1868–1937
Charles Fisher	1819–1821	North Carolina	Democratic-Republican	1789–1849
Charles Fisher	1839–1841	North Carolina	Democratic	1789–1849
David Fisher	1847–1849	Ohio	Whig	1794–1886
George Fisher	1829–1830	New York	National Republican	1788–1861
George P. Fisher	1861–1863	Delaware	Unionist	1817–1899
Horatio G. Fisher	1879–1883	Pennsylvania	Republican	1838–1890
Hubert Fisher	1917–1931	Tennessee	Democratic	1877–1941
John Fisher	1869–1871	New York	Republican	1806–1882
Joseph L. Fisher	1975–1981	Virginia	Democratic	1914–1992
O. C. Fisher	1943–1974	Texas	Democratic	1903–1994
Spencer O. Fisher	1885–1889	Michigan	Democratic	1843–1919
James Fisk	1805–1809; 1811–1815	Vermont	Democratic-Republican	1763–1844
Jonathan Fisk	1809–1811; 1813–1815	New York	Democratic-Republican	1778–1832
Asa Fitch	1811–1813	New York	Federalist	1765–1843
Ashbel P. Fitch	1887–1889	New York	Republican	1848–1904
Ashbel P. Fitch	1889–1893	New York	Democratic	1848–1904
Graham N. Fitch	1849–1853	Indiana	Democratic	1809–1892
Thomas Fitch	1869–1871	Nevada	Republican	1838–1923
Samuel McClary Fite	1875	Tennessee	Democratic	1816–1875
Floyd Fithian	1975–1983	Indiana	Democratic	1928–2003
George W. Fithian	1889–1895	Illinois	Democratic	1854–1921
Frank T. Fitzgerald	1889	New York	Democratic	1857–1907
John F. Fitzgerald	1895–1901; 1919	Massachusetts	Democratic	1863–1950
John J. Fitzgerald	1899–1917	New York	Democratic	1872–1952
Roy G. Fitzgerald	1921–1931	Ohio	Republican	1875–1962
William Fitzgerald	1831–1833	Tennessee	Democratic	1799–1864
William J. Fitzgerald	1937–1939; 1941–1943	Connecticut	Democratic	1887–1947
William T. Fitzgerald	1925–1929	Ohio	Republican	1858–1939
John Fitzgibbons	1933–1935	New York	Democratic	1868–1941
Louis Fitzhenry	1913–1915	Illinois	Democratic	1870–1935
James M. Fitzpatrick	1927–1945	New York	Democratic	1869–1949
Mike Fitzpatrick	2005–2007; 2011–2017	Pennsylvania	Republican	1963–2020
Morgan C. Fitzpatrick	1903–1905	Tennessee	Democratic	1868–1908
Thomas Y. Fitzpatrick	1897–1901	Kentucky	Democratic	1850–1906
Thomas Fitzsimons	1789–1795	Pennsylvania	Pro-Administration	1741–1811
Orvin B. Fjare	1955–1957	Montana	Republican	1918–2011
William H. Flack	1903–1907	New York	Republican	1861–1907
Thomas T. Flagler	1853–1855	New York	Whig	1811–1897
Thomas T. Flagler	1855–1857	New York	Oppositionist	1811–1897
Lawrence J. Flaherty	1925–1926	California	Republican	1878–1926
Thomas A. Flaherty	1937–1943	Massachusetts	Democratic	1898–1965
Floyd Flake	1987–1997	New York	Democratic	1945–present
Jeff Flake	2001–2013	Arizona	Republican	1962–present
De Witt C. Flanagan	1902–1903	New Jersey	Democratic	1870–1946
Michael Flanagan	1995–1997	Illinois	Republican	1962–present
Alvan Flanders	1867–1869	Washington	Republican	1825–1894
Benjamin Flanders	1862–1863	Louisiana	Unionist	1816–1896
John W. Flannagan Jr.	1931–1949	Virginia	Democratic	1885–1955
J. Harold Flannery	1937–1942	Pennsylvania	Democratic	1898–1961
George W. Fleeger	1885–1887	Pennsylvania	Republican	1839–1904
Frederick G. Fleetwood	1923–1925	Vermont	Republican	1868–1938
Anthony A. Fleger	1937–1939	Ohio	Democratic	1900–1963
John Fleming	2009–2017	Louisiana	Republican	1951–present
William B. Fleming	1879	Georgia	Democratic	1803–1886
William Henry Fleming	1897–1903	Georgia	Democratic	1856–1944
Charles K. Fletcher	1947–1949	California	Republican	1902–1985
Ernie Fletcher	1999–2003	Kentucky	Republican	1952–present
Isaac Fletcher	1837–1841	Vermont	Democratic	1784–1842
Loren Fletcher	1893–1903; 1905–1907	Minnesota	Republican	1833–1919
Richard Fletcher	1837–1839	Massachusetts	Whig	1788–1869
Thomas Fletcher	1816–1817	Kentucky	Democratic-Republican	1779–????
Thomas B. Fletcher	1925–1929; 1933–1939	Ohio	Democratic	1879–1945
James P. Flick	1889–1893	Iowa	Republican	1845–1929
Ronnie Flippo	1977–1991	Alabama	Democratic	1937–present
Daniel J. Flood	1945–1947; 1949–1953; 1955–1980	Pennsylvania	Democratic	1903–1994
Henry D. Flood	1901–1921	Virginia	Democratic	1865–1921
Joel West Flood	1932–1933	Virginia	Democratic	1894–1964
Thomas S. Flood	1887–1891	New York	Republican	1844–1908
Elias Florence	1843–1845	Ohio	Whig	1797–1880
Thomas B. Florence	1851–1861	Pennsylvania	Democratic	1812–1875
Bill Flores	2011–2021	Texas	Republican	1954–present
Mayra Flores	2022–2023	Texas	Republican	1986–present
James Florio	1975–1990	New Jersey	Democratic	1937–2022
Thomas S. Flournoy	1847–1849	Virginia	Whig	1811–1883
Roswell P. Flower	1881–1883; 1889–1891	New York	Democratic	1835–1899
Walter Flowers	1969–1979	Alabama	Democratic	1933–1984
Charles A. Floyd	1841–1843	New York	Democratic	1791–1873
John Floyd	1817–1825	Virginia	Democratic-Republican	1783–1837
John Floyd	1825–1829	Virginia	Democratic	1783–1837
John Floyd	1827–1829	Georgia	Democratic	1769–1839
John C. Floyd	1905–1915	Arkansas	Democratic	1858–1930
John G. Floyd	1839–1843; 1851–1853	New York	Democratic	1806–1881
William Floyd	1789–1791	New York	Anti-Administration	1734–1821
Edwin Flye	1876–1877	Maine	Republican	1817–1886
Dennis Thomas Flynn	1893–1897; 1899–1903	Oklahoma	Republican	1861–1939
Gerald T. Flynn	1959–1961	Wisconsin	Democratic	1910–1990
Joseph V. Flynn	1915–1919	New York	Democratic	1883–1940
John Flynt	1954–1979	Georgia	Democratic	1914–2007
Benjamin K. Focht	1907–1913; 1915–1923; 1933–1937	Pennsylvania	Republican	1863–1937
Otto G. Foelker	1908–1911	New York	Republican	1875–1943
Robert H. Foerderer	1901–1903	Pennsylvania	Republican	1860–1903
John E. Fogarty	1941–1944; 1945–1967	Rhode Island	Democratic	1913–1967
Thomas M. Foglietta	1981–1983	Pennsylvania	Independent	1928–2004
Thomas M. Foglietta	1983–1997	Pennsylvania	Democratic	1928–2004
James B. Foley	1857–1859	Indiana	Democratic	1807–1886
John R. Foley	1959–1961	Maryland	Democratic	1917–2001
Mark Foley	1995–2006	Florida	Republican	1954–present
Tom Foley	1965–1995	Washington	Democratic	1929–2013
Alonzo D. Folger	1939–1941	North Carolina	Democratic	1888–1941
John Hamlin Folger	1941–1949	North Carolina	Democratic	1880–1963
Walter Folger Jr.	1817–1821	Massachusetts	Democratic-Republican	1765–1849
John F. Follett	1883–1885	Ohio	Democratic	1831–1902
Samuel A. Foot	1819–1821	Connecticut	Federalist	1780–1846
Samuel A. Foot	1823–1825	Connecticut	Democratic-Republican	1780–1846
Samuel A. Foot	1833–1834	Connecticut	National Republican	1780–1846
Solomon Foot	1843–1847	Vermont	Whig	1802–1866
Charles A. Foote	1823–1825	New York	Democratic-Republican	1785–1828
Ellsworth B. Foote	1947–1949	Connecticut	Republican	1898–1977
Wallace T. Foote Jr.	1895–1899	New York	Republican	1864–1910
Martin A. Foran	1883–1889	Ohio	Democratic	1844–1921
Aime Forand	1937–1939; 1941–1961	Rhode Island	Democratic	1895–1972
Michael Forbes	1995–1999	New York	Republican	1952–present
Michael Forbes	1999–2001	New York	Democratic	1952–present
Randy Forbes	2001–2017	Virginia	Republican	1952–present
Aaron L. Ford	1935–1943	Mississippi	Democratic	1903–1983
George Ford	1885–1887	Indiana	Democratic	1846–1917
Gerald Ford	1949–1973	Michigan	Republican	1913–2006
Harold Ford Jr.	1997–2007	Tennessee	Democratic	1970–present
Harold Ford, Sr.	1975–1997	Tennessee	Democratic	1945–present
James Ford	1829–1833	Pennsylvania	Democratic	1783–1859
Leland M. Ford	1939–1943	California	Republican	1893–1965
Melbourne H. Ford	1887–1889; 1891	Michigan	Democratic	1849–1891
Nicholas Ford	1879–1883	Missouri	Greenbacker	1833–1897
Thomas F. Ford	1933–1945	California	Democratic	1873–1958
William D. Ford	1965–1995	Michigan	Democratic	1927–2004
William Donnison Ford	1819–1821	New York	Democratic-Republican	1779–1833
Joseph W. Fordney	1899–1923	Michigan	Republican	1853–1932
Ed Foreman	1963–1965	Texas	Republican	1933–2022
Ed Foreman	1969–1971	New Mexico	Republican	1933–2022
John B. Forester	1833–1835	Tennessee	Democratic	????–1845
John B. Forester	1835–1837	Tennessee	National Republican	????–1845
Samuel C. Forker	1871–1873	New Jersey	Democratic	1821–1900
William St. John Forman	1889–1895	Illinois	Democratic	1847–1908
Joseph Fornance	1839–1843	Pennsylvania	Democratic	1804–1852
Charles V. Fornes	1907–1913	New York	Democratic	1844–1929
Daniel Munroe Forney	1815–1818	North Carolina	Democratic-Republican	1784–1847
Peter Forney	1813–1815	North Carolina	Democratic-Republican	1756–1834
William H. Forney	1875–1893	Alabama	Democratic	1823–1894
Thomas Forrest	1819–1821; 1822–1823	Pennsylvania	Federalist	1747–1825
Uriah Forrest	1793–1794	Maryland	Pro-Administration	1756–1805
Tic Forrester	1951–1965	Georgia	Democratic	1896–1970
John Forsyth	1813–1818; 1823–1825	Georgia	Democratic-Republican	1780–1841
John Forsyth	1825–1827	Georgia	Democratic	1780–1841
Albert P. Forsythe	1879–1881	Illinois	Greenbacker	1830–1906
Edwin B. Forsythe	1970-1984	New Jersey	Republican	1916–1984
Franklin W. Fort	1925–1931	New Jersey	Republican	1880–1937
Greenbury L. Fort	1873–1881	Illinois	Republican	1825–1883
Tomlinson Fort	1827–1829	Georgia	Democratic	1787–1859
Jeff Fortenberry	2005–2022	Nebraska	Republican	1960–present
Luis Fortuño	2005–2009	Puerto Rico	Republican	1960–present
Chauncey Forward	1826–1831	Pennsylvania	Democratic	1793–1839
Walter Forward	1822–1825	Pennsylvania	Democratic-Republican	1786–1852
Nicoll Fosdick	1825–1827	New York	National Republican	1785–1868
Eugene Foss	1910–1911	Massachusetts	Democratic	1858–1939
Frank H. Foss	1925–1935	Massachusetts	Republican	1865–1947
George E. Foss	1895–1913; 1915–1919	Illinois	Republican	1863–1936
Vito Fossella	1997–2009	New York	Republican	1965–present
A. Lawrence Foster	1841–1843	New York	Whig	1802–1877
Abiel Foster	1789–1791	New Hampshire	Pro-Administration	1735–1806
Abiel Foster	1795–1803	New Hampshire	Federalist	1735–1806
Charles Foster	1871–1879	Ohio	Republican	1828–1904
David J. Foster	1901–1912	Vermont	Republican	1857–1912
Dwight Foster	1793–1795	Massachusetts	Pro-Administration	1757–1823
Dwight Foster	1795–1800	Massachusetts	Federalist	1757–1823
George Peter Foster	1899–1905	Illinois	Democratic	1858–1928
Henry A. Foster	1837–1839	New York	Democratic	1800–1889
Henry D. Foster	1843–1847; 1871–1873	Pennsylvania	Democratic	1808–1880
Israel M. Foster	1919–1925	Ohio	Republican	1873–1950
John H. Foster	1905–1909	Indiana	Republican	1862–1917
Martin D. Foster	1907–1919	Illinois	Democratic	1861–1919
Nathaniel G. Foster	1855–1857	Georgia	American	1809–1869
Stephen Clark Foster	1857–1861	Maine	Republican	1799–1872
Thomas Flournoy Foster	1829–1835	Georgia	Democratic	1790–1848
Thomas Flournoy Foster	1841–1843	Georgia	Whig	1790–1848
Wilder D. Foster	1871–1873	Michigan	Republican	1819–1873
Philip B. Fouke	1859–1863	Illinois	Democratic	1818–1876
George Ernest Foulkes	1933–1935	Michigan	Democratic	1878–1960
William W. Foulkrod	1907–1910	Pennsylvania	Republican	1846–1910
Lawrence H. Fountain	1953–1983	North Carolina	Democratic	1913–2002
Charles N. Fowler	1895–1911	New Jersey	Republican	1852–1932
H. Robert Fowler	1911–1915	Illinois	Democratic	1851–1926
John Fowler	1797–1807	Kentucky	Democratic-Republican	1755–1840
John Edgar Fowler	1897–1899	North Carolina	Populist	1866–1930
Orin Fowler	1849–1852	Massachusetts	Whig	1791–1852
Samuel Fowler	1833–1837	New Jersey	Democratic	1779–1844
Samuel Fowler	1889–1893	New Jersey	Democratic	1851–1919
Tillie K. Fowler	1993–2001	Florida	Republican	1942–2005
Wyche Fowler	1977–1987	Georgia	Democratic	1940–present
Andrew F. Fox	1897–1903	Mississippi	Democratic	1849–1926
John Fox	1867–1871	New York	Democratic	1835–1914
Jon D. Fox	1995–1999	Pennsylvania	Republican	1947–2018
Richard Franchot	1861–1863	New York	Republican	1816–1875
George B. Francis	1917–1919	New York	Republican	1883–1967
William B. Francis	1911–1915	Ohio	Democratic	1860–1954
Augustus Frank	1859–1865	New York	Republican	1826–1895
Barney Frank	1981–2013	Massachusetts	Democratic	1940–2026
Nathan Frank	1889–1891	Missouri	Republican	1852–1931
William H. Frankhauser	1921	Michigan	Republican	1863–1921
Benjamin J. Franklin	1875–1879	Missouri	Democratic	1839–1898
Jesse Franklin	1795–1797	North Carolina	Democratic-Republican	1760–1823
John R. Franklin	1853–1855	Maryland	Whig	1820–1878
Meshack Franklin	1807–1815	North Carolina	Democratic-Republican	1772–1839
Webb Franklin	1983–1987	Mississippi	Republican	1941–present
Bob Franks	1993–2001	New Jersey	Republican	1951–2010
Gary Franks	1991–1997	Connecticut	Republican	1953–present
Trent Franks	2003–2017	Arizona	Republican	1957–present
Donald M. Fraser	1963–1979	Minnesota	Democratic-Farmer-Labor	1924–2019
Victor O. Frazer	1995–1997	U.S. Virgin Islands	Independent	1943–present
James B. Frazier Jr.	1949–1963	Tennessee	Democratic	1890–1978
James A. Frear	1913–1935	Wisconsin	Republican	1861–1939
Benjamin T. Frederick	1885–1887	Iowa	Democratic	1834–1903
John D. Fredericks	1923–1927	California	Republican	1869–1945
Arthur M. Free	1921–1933	California	Republican	1879–1953
John Freedley	1847–1851	Pennsylvania	Whig	1793–1851
Chapman Freeman	1875–1879	Pennsylvania	Republican	1832–1904
James C. Freeman	1873–1875	Georgia	Republican	1819–1885
John D. Freeman	1851–1853	Mississippi	Unionist	????–1886
Jonathan Freeman	1797–1801	New Hampshire	Federalist	1745–1808
Nathaniel Freeman Jr.	1795–1797	Massachusetts	Federalist	1766–1800
Nathaniel Freeman Jr.	1797–1799	Massachusetts	Democratic-Republican	1766–1800
Richard P. Freeman	1915–1933	Connecticut	Republican	1869–1944
Romeo H. Freer	1899–1901	West Virginia	Republican	1846–1913
Peter Frelinghuysen Jr.	1953–1975	New Jersey	Republican	1916–2011
Rodney Frelinghuysen	1995–2019	New Jersey	Republican	1946–present
Burton L. French	1903–1909; 1911–1915; 1917–1933	Idaho	Republican	1875–1954
Carlos French	1887–1889	Connecticut	Democratic	1835–1903
Ezra B. French	1859–1861	Maine	Republican	1810–1880
John R. French	1868–1869	North Carolina	Republican	1819–1890
Richard French	1835–1837; 1843–1845; 1847–1849	Kentucky	Democratic	1792–1854
Bill Frenzel	1971–1991	Minnesota	Republican	1928–2014
Lou Frey	1969–1979	Florida	Republican	1934–2019
Oliver W. Frey	1933–1939	Pennsylvania	Democratic	1887–1939
Henry Frick	1843–1844	Pennsylvania	Whig	1795–1844
Samuel Friedel	1953–1971	Maryland	Democratic	1898–1979
Frank W. Fries	1937–1941	Illinois	Democratic	1893–1980
George Fries	1845–1849	Ohio	Democratic	1799–1866
Dan Frisa	1995–1997	New York	Republican	1955–present
Harold V. Froehlich	1973–1975	Wisconsin	Republican	1932–present
Joel Frost	1823–1825	New York	Democratic-Republican	1765–1827
Martin Frost	1979–2005	Texas	Democratic	1942–present
R. Graham Frost	1879–1883	Missouri	Democratic	1851–1900
Rufus S. Frost	1875–1876	Massachusetts	Republican	1826–1894
Louis A. Frothingham	1921–1928	Massachusetts	Republican	1871–1928
Jacob Fry Jr.	1835–1839	Pennsylvania	Democratic	1802–1866
Joseph Fry Jr.	1827–1831	Pennsylvania	Democratic	1781–1860
William P. Frye	1871–1881	Maine	Republican	1830–1911
Marcia Fudge	2008–2021	Ohio	Democratic	1952–present
Thomas B. Fugate	1949–1953	Virginia	Democratic	1899–1980
J. William Fulbright	1943–1945	Arkansas	Democratic	1905–1995
James F. Fulbright	1923–1925; 1927–1929; 1931–1933	Missouri	Democratic	1877–1948
Abram Fulkerson	1881–1883	Virginia	Democratic	1834–1902
Frank B. Fulkerson	1905–1907	Missouri	Republican	1866–1936
Alvan T. Fuller	1917–1919	Massachusetts	Independent Republican	1878–1958
Alvan T. Fuller	1919–1921	Massachusetts	Republican	1878–1958
Benoni S. Fuller	1875–1879	Indiana	Democratic	1825–1903
Charles Eugene Fuller	1903–1913; 1915–1926	Illinois	Republican	1849–1926
Claude A. Fuller	1929–1939	Arkansas	Democratic	1876–1968
George Fuller	1844–1845	Pennsylvania	Democratic	1802–1888
Hadwen C. Fuller	1943–1949	New York	Republican	1895–1990
Henry Mills Fuller	1851–1853	Pennsylvania	Whig	1820–1860
Henry Mills Fuller	1855–1857	Pennsylvania	Oppositionist	1820–1860
Philo C. Fuller	1833–1835	New York	Anti-Masonic	1787–1855
Philo C. Fuller	1835–1836	New York	National Republican	1787–1855
Thomas J. D. Fuller	1849–1857	Maine	Democratic	1808–1876
Timothy Fuller	1817–1825	Massachusetts	Democratic-Republican	1778–1835
William E. Fuller	1885–1889	Iowa	Republican	1846–1918
William K. Fuller	1833–1837	New York	Democratic	1792–1883
David Fullerton	1819–1820	Pennsylvania	Democratic-Republican	1772–1843
Hampton P. Fulmer	1921–1944	South Carolina	Democratic	1875–1944
Willa L. Fulmer	1944–1945	South Carolina	Democratic	1884–1968
Andrew S. Fulton	1847–1849	Virginia	Whig	1800–1884
Elmer L. Fulton	1907–1909	Oklahoma	Democratic	1865–1939
James G. Fulton	1945–1971	Pennsylvania	Republican	1903–1971
John H. Fulton	1833–1835	Virginia	Democratic	1792–1836
Richard Fulton	1963–1975	Tennessee	Democratic	1927–2018
David Funderburk	1995–1997	North Carolina	Republican	1944–present
Benjamin F. Funk	1893–1895	Illinois	Republican	1838–1909
Frank H. Funk	1921–1927	Illinois	Republican	1869–1940
Edward H. Funston	1884–1894	Kansas	Republican	1836–1911
Don Fuqua	1963–1987	Florida	Democratic	1933–present
Foster Furcolo	1949–1952	Massachusetts	Democratic	1911–1995
Grant Furlong	1943–1945	Pennsylvania	Democratic	1886–1973
Allen J. Furlow	1925–1929	Minnesota	Republican	1890–1954
Elizabeth Furse	1993–1999	Oregon	Democratic	1936–2021
Jaime Fuster	1985–1992	Puerto Rico	Democratic	1941–2007
Robert W. Fyan	1883–1885; 1891–1895	Missouri	Democratic	1835–1896
