= Charles H. Mason =

American politician (1830–1859)

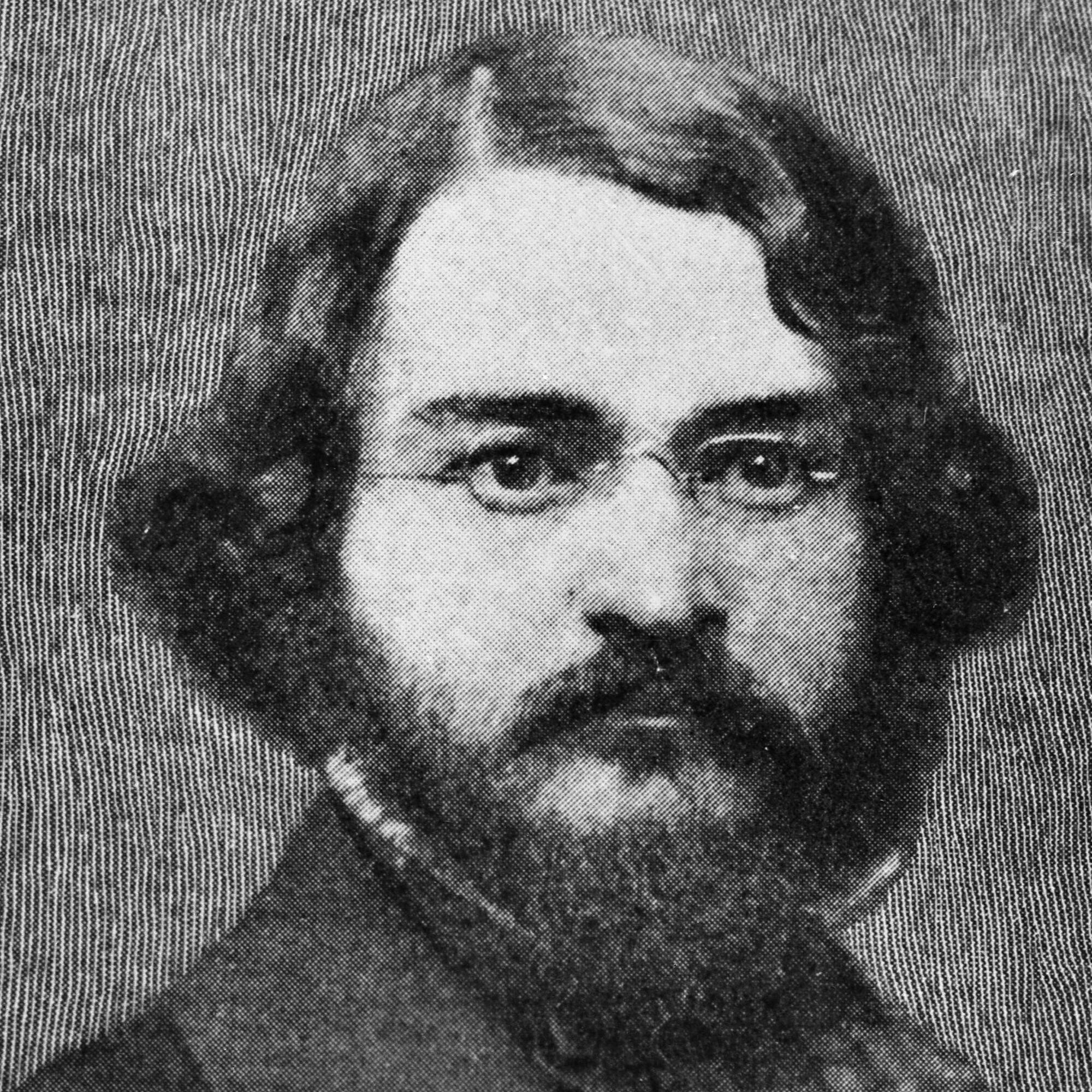
- Mason c. 1853-1859

1st Secretary of Washington Territory
- In office November 25, 1853 – July 29, 1859
- Governor: Isaac Stevens; Fayette McMullen; Richard D. Gholson
- Preceded by: Office established
- Succeeded by: Henry M. McGill

Personal details
- Born: 1830 Fort Washington, Maryland, U.S.
- Died: July 29, 1859 (aged 28–29) Olympia, Washington Territory, U.S.
- Education: Brown University

Charles H. Mason (1830 – July 29, 1859) was an American politician, the first Secretary of State for Washington Territory, and acting Governor for two and a half years while the territorial Governor, Isaac Ingalls Stevens, conducted railroad surveys and concluded treaties with First Nations tribes and confederations.

== Biography ==
Mason was born in 1830 in Fort Washington, Maryland. After the death of his father in 1837, he moved with his mother to her home town of Providence, Rhode Island. Mason graduated with honors from Brown University in 1850 and was recommended for the bar shortly after. Following the establishment of Washington Territory in March 1853, Mason was appointed Secretary of the Territory and came west, arriving in September 1853.

As Acting Governor he served the state in time of war, from October 1855 to January 1856, as hostilities between settlers and First Nations peoples erupted in Snohomish, King, Pierce, and Thurston counties. Historians assess his efforts during this time as "marked with energy, decision, and wisdom." Mason called for volunteers, maintained peaceful relations with non-hostile bands, and treated all parties with fairness. From May 15, 1855, Mason assisted Stevens in the negotiations of the Medicine Creek and Point No Point Treaties and was credited as the secretary of the treaty commissions. Mason transported documents to the nation's capital and secured $300,000 for territorial aid.

In all he served four stints as acting Governor:

1. March 26, 1854 – December 1854
2. May 12, 1855 – January 19, 1856: Gov. Stevens was in eastern Washington to establish treaties.
3. August 1857 – September 1857: Gov. Stevens resigned to become the delegate in Congress for Washington Territory. Mason acted as governor until Gov. Fayette McMullen arrived.
4. August 1858 – July 1859: Gov. McMullen was removed from office. Mason acted as governor until Gov. Richard D. Gholson arrived.

Mason died after a brief illness at Olympia, Washington Territory. Isaac Stevens gave his eulogy at the funeral. His burial location was established by the Washington state Archivist from the primary source material and his grave marked in 1997 following an extensive search.

Mason County, Washington was renamed in 1864 in his honor. Mason Lake, in that county, was also named for him.
