= Charles G. Conn =

American politician and band instrument manufacturer (1844–1931)

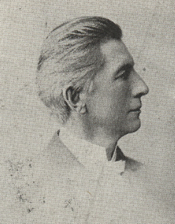

Member of the U.S. House of Representatives from Indiana's 13th district
- In office March 4, 1893 – March 4, 1895
- Preceded by: Benjamin F. Shively
- Succeeded by: Lemuel W. Royse

Member of the Indiana House of Representatives for Elkhart, Noble, and DeKalb
- In office January 10, 1889 – January 8, 1891
- Preceded by: William M. Van Slyke
- Succeeded by: Norman Teal

Personal details
- Born: January 29, 1844 Phelps, New York, U.S.
- Died: January 5, 1931 (aged 86) Los Angeles, California, U.S.
- Party: Democratic
- Known for: Founder of C.G. Conn

Military service
- Allegiance: United States
- Branch/service: United States Army
- Years of service: 1861–1863; 1863–1865
- Rank: Captain
- Unit: 15th Indiana Infantry and 1st Michigan Volunteer Sharpshooters Regiment
- Battles/wars: American Civil War

Charles Gerard Conn (January 29, 1844 – January 5, 1931) was an entrepreneur, band instrument manufacturer, newspaper publisher, and U.S. Representative from Indiana for one term from 1893 to 1895.

== Biography ==
=== Early life and education ===
Charles Gerard Conn was born in Phelps, New York, on January 29, 1844. In 1850, he accompanied his family to Three Rivers, Michigan, and in the following year to Elkhart, Indiana. Little is known about his early life, other than that he learned to play the cornet.

=== Civil War ===
With the outbreak of the American Civil War, he enlisted in the United States Army on May 18, 1861, at the age of seventeen, despite his parents' protests. On June 14, 1861, he became a private in Company B, 15th Regiment Indiana Infantry, and shortly afterwards was assigned to a regimental band. When his enlistment expired he returned to Elkhart, but re-enlisted on December 12, 1863, at Niles, Michigan, in Company G, 1st Michigan Sharpshooters. At the age of nineteen on August 8, 1863, he was elevated to the rank of captain. He would briefly command the sharpshooters after suffering extreme casualties during the Overland Campaign and the Second Battle of Petersburg. During the Battle of the Crater on July 30, 1864, Conn was wounded and taken prisoner. In spite of two imaginative and valiant attempts to escape, he was recaptured and spent the remainder of the war in captivity. At the end of hostilities, he was released from Columbia, South Carolina, prison camp, and was honorably discharged on July 28, 1865. He was one of only six Union soldiers to be retroactively awarded the Silver Citation Star on the Civil War Campaign Medal for gallantry in action.

=== Career ===
After the war he engaged in the grocery and bakery business. In 1871, while serving as a band leader in Buchanan, Michigan, Conn badly injured his hand while working at the local zinc horse collar-pad factory. The accident forced Conn to switch from violin to cornet.

In 1877, Conn and his wife, Catherine, relocated to Elkhart, Indiana, where Conn worked various jobs for two years. During this time, Conn sold health care products under the tradename "Konn's Kurative Kream", and invented parts for sewing machines. He also plated and engraved silverware, and manufactured rubber stamps. Drawing from the skills learned at his previous jobs, he invented a cornet mouthpiece with a rubber rim, which began his career in the manufacture of band instruments Conn was an important innovator in the development of modern wind instruments, and established the C.G. Conn Company, a major instrument manufacturer, in Elkhart.

Charles Conn was elected Mayor of Elkhart in 1880. In 1884, Conn organized the 1st Regiment of Artillery in the Indiana Legion and became its first Colonel, a military title which stayed with him throughout the remainder of his life. He was also the first commander of the Elkhart Commandery of the Knights Templar. Colonel Conn also served as Lieutenant Colonel of the 2nd Regiment of Uniform Rank, Knights of Pythias, and was re-elected many times as Commander of the local G.A.R. post.

In 1880, Conn was elected mayor of Elkhart on the Democratic ticket. He was re-elected in 1882 but did not finish the term. Ten days before the general election in 1888, Conn was drafted as an emergency Democratic candidate for the Indiana House of Representatives, and won the election.

Conn founded a newspaper, the Elkhart Daily Truth, on 15 October 1889, which is still operating as The Elkhart Truth. He published the monthly Trumpet Notes which he circulated amongst his employees and dealers. He also published a scandal sheet called The Gossip which, along with the town doings, he used occasionally to attack his competitors and enemies.

=== Congress ===
Conn was elected as a Democrat to the Fifty-third Congress (4 March 1893 – 3 March 1895), but he was not a candidate for renomination in 1894. The same year, during his congressional term, Conn bought the newly established Washington Times, and conducted a sensational campaign against alleged vice in the city. Eventually he found himself as a defendant in a big damage suit, but won the case. Sometime later he disposed of the paper.

=== Later career ===
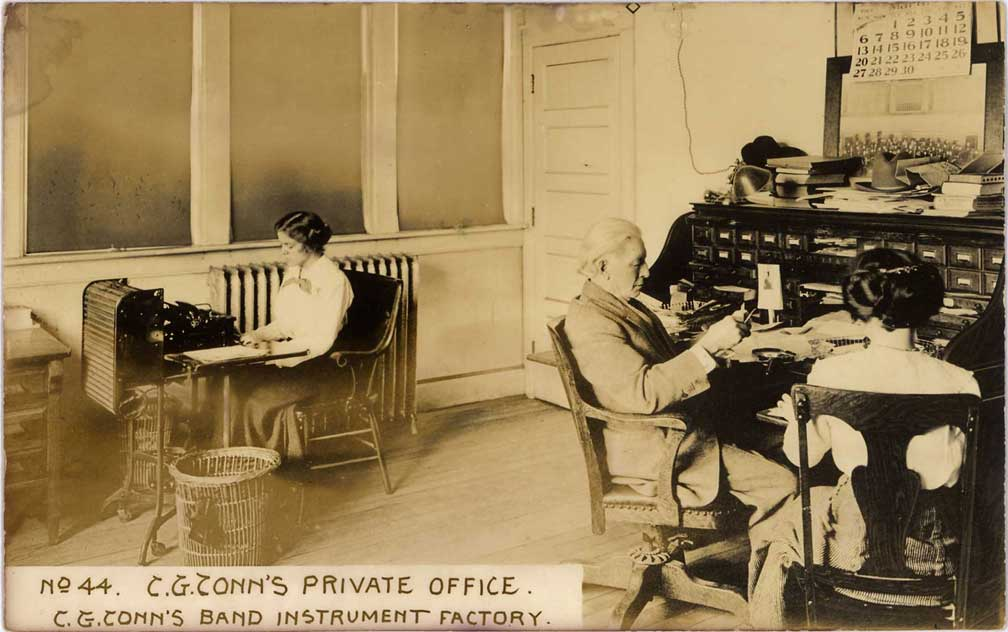
C.G. Conn in his office, March 1910.

After his term in Congress, Conn resumed the manufacture of band instruments at Elkhart, Indiana, while also investing heavily in other businesses. In 1904 Conn constructed a powerhouse and provided electrical service as a competitor to the Indiana and Michigan Electric Company, who later bought out Conn's service at a great loss to himself. This failed venture, the building of Conn's third factory and its loss to fire, and Conn's loss of a costly lawsuit filed against him by a former company manager resulted in Conn amassing a large amount of debt. In 1911, in an effort to bond Conn's debts and secure working capital, Conn and his wife executed a trust deed for $200,000 covering all their possessions, with the longest bond to mature in ten years. The deed included, in addition to the horn factory, what was then known as the Angledile Scale Company, and The Elkhart Truth, some sixty descriptions of real estate in Elkhart and vicinity, various real estate mortgages, 125 shares of stock in the Simplex Motor Car Company of Mishawaka, Indiana, a seagoing yacht, a lake motor launch, and much valuable personal property. Conn also lost considerable face when he was ordered by a judge to publicly apologize for publishing inflammatory comments about his Pennsylvania competitor, J. W. Pepper. The Musical Courier picked up on the legal problems and reported about how Conn was knowingly making false statements about Pepper. In his published apology, Conn attributed his aberrant behavior on an addiction to tobacco.

In 1915 Conn's growing debt crisis forced him to seek a buyer for his assets, and all of Conn's holdings were bought by a group of investors led by Carl Dimond Greenleaf, whom Conn had met during his years in Washington, D.C., and invested in some grain mills in Ohio which Greenleaf owned. Initially Conn held onto ownership of The Elkhart Truth, but a few months after the sale of his other holdings, Conn sold The Elkhart Truth to Greenleaf and local entrepreneur Andrew Hubble Beardsley.

=== Retirement and death ===
The sale of Conn's holdings was detrimental to his marriage, and he and his wife Kate divorced. In 1916 Conn retired and moved to Los Angeles, California, where he married Suzanne Cohn. Their son, Charles Gerard Conn III, was born in 1918.

Conn authored books in his retirement, including The Sixth Sense, Prayer: Brain Cell Reformation (1916), For the Good of the World. Finding the Real God (1919), and The Wonder Book: How to Achieve Success (1923). Conn died on January 5, 1931, in Los Angeles, and was interred in Grace Lawn Cemetery, Elkhart, Indiana. Once a very wealthy and influential man, he died almost penniless. His estate did not have enough money in it to afford a grave marker, and a hat was passed around the horn factory to collect enough money to buy one.

Mrs. Conn was permitted to remain in the Conns’ Elkhart home, the Charles Gerard Conn Mansion, where she lived until her death in 1924. The mansion was added to the National Register of Historic Places in 2007.

== See also ==
- C.G. Conn

U.S. House of Representatives
Preceded by Benjamin F. Shively	Member of the U.S. House of Representatives from Indiana's 13th congressional district 1893–1895	Succeeded by Lemuel W. Royse
