= Governor Mason =

Governor Mason may refer to:

- Charles H. Mason (1830–1859), Acting Governor of Washington
- John Mason (governor) (1586–1635), 2nd Proprietary Governor of Newfoundland's Cuper's Cove colony
- Richard Barnes Mason (1797–1850), military governor of California
- Sandra Mason (born 1949), Governor-General of Barbados
- Stevens T. Mason (1811–1843), 1st Governor of Michigan
