= 1896 Indiana gubernatorial election =

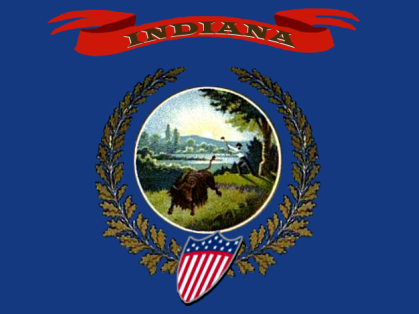
- November 3, 1896
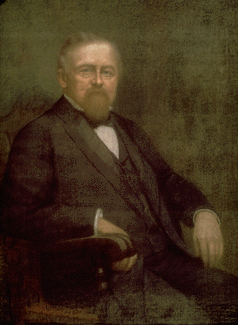

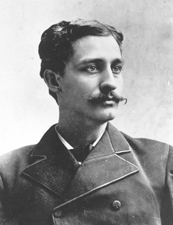
Nominee	James A. Mount	Benjamin F. Shively
Party	Republican	Democratic
Popular vote	320,936	294,855
Percentage	50.93%	46.79%
- County results Mount: 40–50% 50–60% 60–70% Shivley: 40–50% 50–60% 60–70%
Governor before election
Claude Matthews
Democratic
Elected Governor
James A. Mount
Republican

The 1896 Indiana gubernatorial election was held on November 3, 1896. Republican nominee James A. Mount defeated Democratic nominee Benjamin F. Shively with 50.93% of the vote.

== General election ==
=== Candidates ===
Major party candidates

- James A. Mount, Republican, former state senator
- Benjamin F. Shively, Democratic, former U.S. Representative from Indiana's 13th congressional district

Other candidates

- Thomas Wadsworth, People's
- Leander M. Crist, Prohibition
- James G. Kingsbury, National
- Philip H. Moore, Socialist Labor

=== Results ===
1896 Indiana gubernatorial election
Party	Candidate	Votes	%	±%
Republican	James A. Mount	320,936	50.93%	
Democratic	Benjamin F. Shively	294,855	46.79%	
Populist	Thomas Wadsworth	8,626	1.37%	
Prohibition	Leander M. Crist	2,997	0.48%	
National	James G. Kingsbury	2,500	0.40%	
Socialist Labor	Philip H. Moore	283	0.05%	
Majority		26,081		
Turnout				
Republican gain from Democratic		Swing		
