= Henry A. Barnhart =

American politician

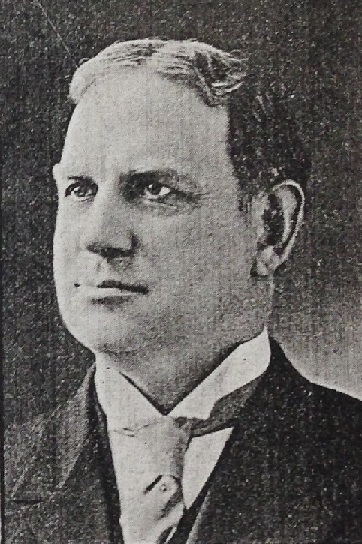

Member of the U.S. House of Representatives from Indiana's 13th district
- In office November 3, 1908 – March 3, 1919
- Preceded by: Abraham L. Brick
- Succeeded by: Andrew J. Hickey

Personal details
- Born: September 11, 1858 Twelve Mile, Indiana, U.S.
- Died: March 26, 1934 (aged 75) Rochester, Indiana, U.S.
- Resting place: The Mausoleum, Rochester, Indiana
- Party: Democratic
- Education: Amboy Academy

Henry A. Barnhart (September 11, 1858 – March 26, 1934) was an American businessman and politician who served as a U.S. representative from Indiana from 1908 to 1919.

== Biography ==
Born near Twelve Mile, Indiana, Barnhart attended the common schools, Amboy Academy, and Wabash Normal Training School. He was a teacher, farmer, surveyor of Fulton County, Indiana from 1885 to 1887, newspaper publisher, and businessman. He served as director of the United States Bank Trust Co.. He served as director, Indiana State Prison, 1893. He was also a hospital executive.

=== Congress ===
Barnhart was elected as a Democrat to the Sixtieth Congress to fill the vacancy caused by the death of United States Representative Abraham L. Brick. He was reelected to the Sixty-first and to the four succeeding Congresses (November 3, 1908 – March 3, 1919). He was an unsuccessful candidate for reelection to the Sixty-sixth Congress in 1918. He later worked as a lecturer.

=== Death ===
He died on March 26, 1934, in Rochester, Indiana. He was interred in the Mausoleum in Rochester.

U.S. House of Representatives
Preceded by Abraham L. Brick	Member of the U.S. House of Representatives from Indiana's 13th congressional district 1908-1919	Succeeded by Andrew J. Hickey
