= Lemuel W. Royse =

American politician (1847–1946)

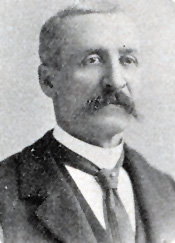

Member of the U.S. House of Representatives from Indiana's 13th district
- In office March 4, 1895 – March 3, 1899
- Preceded by: Charles G. Conn
- Succeeded by: Abraham L. Brick

Personal details
- Born: Lemuel Willard Royse; January 19, 1847 Pierceton, Indiana
- Died: December 18, 1946 (aged 99) Warsaw, Indiana
- Resting place: Oakwood Cemetery
- Profession: lawyer

Lemuel Willard Royse (January 19, 1847 – December 18, 1946) was an American lawyer, jurist, and politician who served two terms as a U.S. representative from Indiana from 1895 to 1899.

== Biography ==
Born near Pierceton, Indiana, Royse attended the common schools. He studied law. He was admitted to the bar in 1874 and commenced practice in Warsaw, Indiana.

He served as prosecuting attorney for the thirty-third judicial circuit of Indiana in 1876. He served as mayor of Warsaw 1885–1891. He served as member of the Republican State central committee from 1886 to 1890. He served as delegate to the Republican National Convention in 1892.

=== Congress ===
Royse was elected as a Republican to the Fifty-fourth and Fifty-fifth Congresses (March 4, 1895 – March 3, 1899). He served as chairman of the Committee on Elections No. 2 (Fifty-fifth Congress). He was an unsuccessful candidate for renomination in 1898.

=== Later career and death ===
He resumed the practice of law in Warsaw, Indiana. He served as judge of the Kosciusko County Circuit Court 1904–1908.

He resumed the practice of his profession. He was reelected circuit judge and served from 1920 to 1932. He again resumed the practice of law until his retirement in 1940.

He died in Warsaw, Indiana, December 18, 1946, one month shy of his 100th birthday. He was interred in Oakwood Cemetery.

U.S. House of Representatives
| Preceded by Charles G. Conn | Member of the U.S. House of Representatives from Indiana's 13th congressional district 1895–1899 | Succeeded by Abraham L. Brick |
