= Oscar M. Crutchfield =

American politician

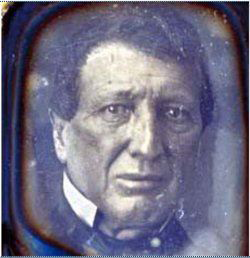

26th Speaker of the Virginia House of Delegates
- In office 1852 – May 15, 1861
- Preceded by: George W. Hopkins
- Succeeded by: James L. Kemper

Member of the Virginia House of Delegates from the Spotsylvania district
- In office December 2, 1850 – May 15, 1861
- Preceded by: Eustace Conway
- Succeeded by: Douglas H. Gordon
- In office December 1, 1834 – December 3, 1843
- Preceded by: Carter L. Stephenson
- Succeeded by: Hubbard C Minor

Personal details
- Born: Oscar Minor Crutchfield; January 16, 1800 Culpeper County, Virginia, US
- Died: May 15, 1861 (aged 61) Spring Forest plantation, Spotsylvania County, Virginia
- Resting place: Green Branch plantation, Spotsylvania County, Virginia
- Party: Whig
- Spouse: Susan Elizabeth Gatewood
- Parent(s): Stapleton Crutchfield, Elizabeth Lewis Minor
- Profession: politician, farmer

Military service
- Allegiance: United States of America
- Branch/service: Virginia Militia
- Rank: Major

Oscar Minor Crutchfield (16 January 1800 – 15 May 1861) was a Virginia lawyer, politician and planter who represented Spotsylvania County in the Virginia House of Delegates for many years, and in the final decade of his life served as that body's Speaker from 1852 until 1861. He presided over the House during the special session that on 19 January 1861 approved the calling of a state convention to consider Virginia's response to the secession crisis.

== Early and family life ==
The first child born to the former Elizabeth Lewis Minor (c. 1773-c. 1839) on the Crutchfield family "Spring forest" plantation near Snell, he would have at least two younger brothers and four sisters (of whom three married). His paternal grandfather Stapleton Crutchfield (1729-1788) moved his family to Spotsylvania County from Middlesex County after serving as a (47 year old) private in the 10th Virginia regiment during the American Revolutionary War, and his father Major Stapleton Crutchfield Sr. (1776-1818) became a hero of the War of 1812 before representing Spotsylvania County in the House of Delegates for several years during this man's boyhood. His mother's family came from nearby Louisa County and her father (this boy's maternal grandfather) Col. Garrett Lewis Minor was likewise a veteran officer. After his father died in 1818, when this son had not quite reached legal age, his mother supported the family by operating a school, as well as taking in boarders. His never married uncle Robert Crutchfield (1771-1844) operated the family farm.

His education is unclear, other that during 1824 and 1825 he accompanied civil engineer Moncure Robinson (of a prominent neighboring family) on a tour of European dykes and windmills He also practiced law occasionally. On October 24, 1833, he married his cousin, Susan Elizabeth Gatewood of Essex County. The couple would have seven sons (three of whom served in the Confederate States Army including Stapleton Crutchfield) and a daughter.

== Career ==
When Crutchfield sought to retire from political office in 1860, he cited failing health as well as financial obligations to certain estates for which he was serving as trustee, indicating that he maintained a legal practice for years.

Nonetheless, at least after about 1840, like his father, uncle and grandfather, Crutchfield was a planter, whose farming operations relied on enslaved labor. In the 1840s, he developed a 1,167.5 acre plantion on the Mat river that he called "Green Branch." In the 1840 census, he owned 29 slaves in Spotsylvania County, and his uncle Robert Crutchfield nearly three times as many. In the 1850 census, he owned 41 enslaved people in Spotsylvania County, and his mother another 19. In the last census of his life, Crutchfield owned 55 slaves Because of the Spotsylvania County label, he appears the owner of 10, 12 and 13 year old male slaves leased in nearby Louisa County in 1860. as well as a 32 year old woman in Petersburg.

Crutchfield's first public office was deputy sheriff of Spotsylvania County, which began in 1822, and two decades later he became the county sheriff (Feb. 7, 1843-Dec. 10, 1844). Meanwhile, in 1825 Crutchfield was appointed one of the Justices of the Peace for Spotsylvania County (the justices collectively in that era also administering the county). He became presiding judge of that body by March 1829, and continued to hold that position until resigning on June 29, 1852 (although he retained his justice of the peace position until his death). He also served in the county militia, rising to the rank of brigade inspector with the rank of major before beginning his political career below.

Beginning in 1834, Spotsylvania County voters elected Crutchfield as their sole delegate in the Virginia House of Delegates, and re-elected him nine times (he may not have sought re-election after inheriting the farm from his uncle). He aligned as a Whig, but that party disintegrated by 1850. He finished ninth in the ten or eleven-candidate field to represent the combined district of Caroline, Hanover, King William and Spotsylvania counties in the Constitutional Convention of 1850, in which his by then successor in the House of Delegates for Spotsylvania County, pro-slavery Fredericksburg lawyer Eustace Conway ran third.

After adoption of the Virginia Constitution of 1851 (which increased representation of Piedmont and western Virginians), Crutchfield successfully ran to become Spotsylvania county's sole delegate, and won re-election every following year until his death.

Fellow legislators elected Crutchfield as their speaker, and likewise re-elected him until his death, usually either unanimously or by overwhelming margins, as he had a reputation for courtesy, evenhandedness and impartiality. His nine years in office were only surpassed in that century by Linn Banks of Madison County (to the west but also in Virginia's Piedmont region). Although Crutchfield initially announced his intent to retire following the spring 1861 legislative session, Crutchfield reconsidered after Virginia voted to secede from the union, announcing that he favored a single party "for the achievement of Southern Liberty, Southern Rights and a Southern Union forever separated from a Northern Union"

In 1855, Crutchfield also charied the state Democratic convention that selected Henry Alexander Wise as its (successful) gubernatorial candidate. Nonetheless, some formerly Whig newspapers urged Crutchfield to run as the Know Nothing Party candidtate against Wise. Also, some in Spotsylvania County and in southwestern Virginia suggested that Crutchfield become a statewide candidate for governor or lieutenant governor in 1858, but he declined to run and Democrat John Letcher was elected. Crutchfield also served on Fredericksburg's committee to arrange the Marquis de LaFayette's visit to the area in 1824. Like Lafayette, Crutchfield was also a prominent Mason, and rose to become Grand Master of the Grand Lodge of Virginia (from 14 December 1841 through 12 December 1843) despite never having served as president of his local lodge as normally occurred. Other civic activities were as assistant marshal during the unveiling of a monument to Mary Ball Washington in 1833, manager of George Washington's birthday ball in 1839 and as a member of a committee to erect a monument honoring Revolutionary war general Hugh Mercer in Fredericksburg in 1857.

== Death and legacy ==
Crutchfield died of apoplexy at his Green Branch plantation, after a day of supervising plantation operations. He is buried on his Spotsylvania County estate. Although his son Stapleton Crutchfield became the artillery chief for the Army of Northern Virginia, he was severely wounded at the Battle of Chancellorsville and died of injuries at the Battle of Saylor's Creek near then end of the American Civil War. Two other sons survived the conflict.
