= Benjamin F. Shively =

American politician (1857–1916)

Benjamin Franklin Shively
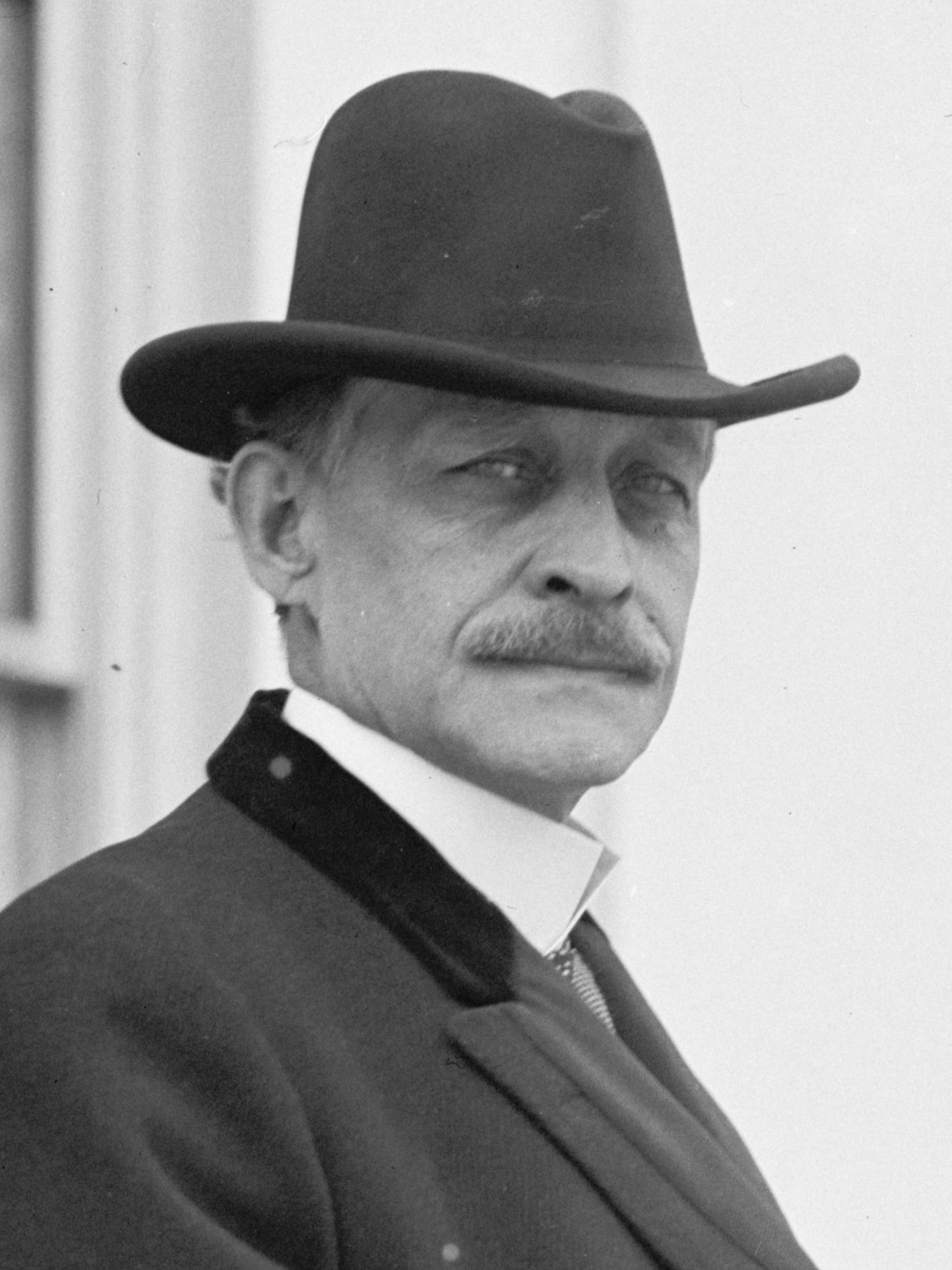
- Shively in 1913

United States Senator from Indiana
- In office March 4, 1909 – March 14, 1916
- Preceded by: James A. Hemenway
- Succeeded by: Thomas Taggart

Member of the U.S. House of Representatives from Indiana's 13th district
- In office March 4, 1887 – March 3, 1893
- Preceded by: George Ford
- Succeeded by: Charles G. Conn
- In office December 1, 1884 – March 3, 1885
- Preceded by: William H. Calkins
- Succeeded by: George Ford

Personal details
- Born: March 20, 1857 Osceola, Indiana, US
- Died: March 14, 1916 (aged 58) Washington, D.C., US
- Party: Democratic; Anti-Monopoly (1884)
- Education: Northern Indiana Normal School; University of Michigan at Ann Arbor
- Profession: Attorney

Benjamin Franklin Shively (March 20, 1857 – March 14, 1916) was an American politician and lawyer who served as a United States representative (1884 to 1885 and 1887 to 1893) and senator (1909 to 1916) from Indiana.

== Biography ==
=== Early life, education, and career ===
Shively was born on a farm near Osceola, Indiana, to Rev. Joel Shively and Elizabeth (née Pendleton) Shively. Joel Shively was the son of Rev. George Shively, who arrived in Indiana in 1864 after living in Washington County, Pennsylvania, and Stark County, Ohio. Elizabeth Pendleton was a native of Somerset County, Pennsylvania.

Benjamin Shively attended the common schools and the Northern Indiana Normal School at Valparaiso. After considering a career as a carpenter, Shively taught school from 1874 to 1880. From 1880 to 1884, Shively edited the Era, a newspaper in St. Joseph County. He was secretary of the National Anti-Monopoly Association in 1883. In 1884 he was president of the board of Indiana University and was elected as a National Anti-Monopolist to the Forty-eighth Congress to fill the vacancy caused by the resignation of William H. Calkins, serving from December 1, 1884, to March 3, 1885.

Shively graduated from the Law School of the University of Michigan at Ann Arbor in 1886, was admitted to the bar, and commenced practice in South Bend, Indiana.

=== Congressional service ===
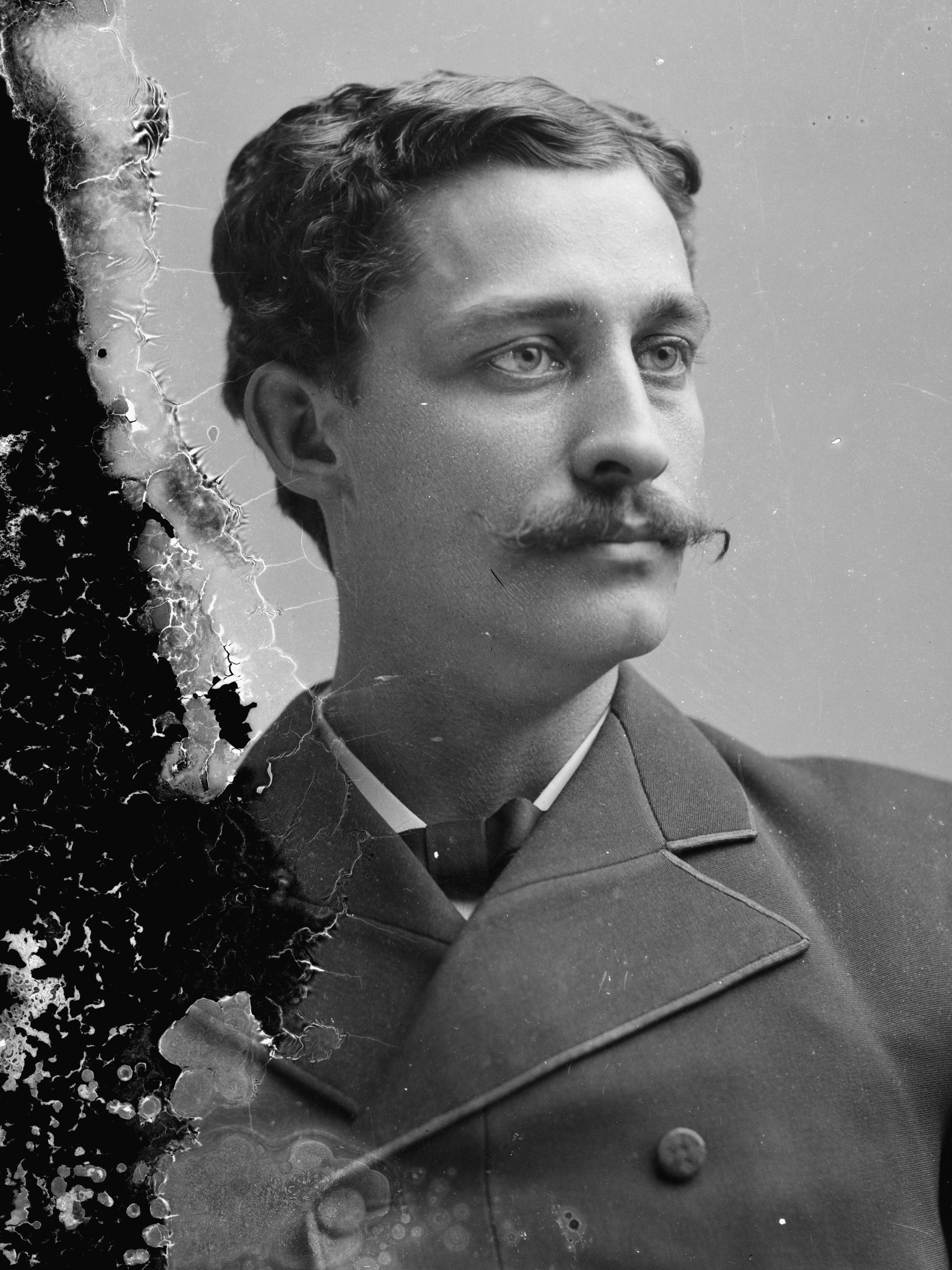
Portrait by C. M. Bell c. 1884–1890

He was elected as a Democrat to the Fiftieth, Fifty-first, and Fifty-second Congresses, serving from March 4, 1887, to March 4, 1893; he was not a candidate for renomination in 1892, and resumed the practice of law in South Bend. He was an unsuccessful Democratic candidate for Governor of Indiana in 1896 and was an unsuccessful candidate for election in 1906 to the Sixtieth Congress; in 1909 he was elected to the U.S. Senate and reelected in 1914 and served from March 4, 1909, until his death. While in the Senate he was chairman of the Committee on Pacific Railroads (Sixty-second Congress) and a member of the Committee on Pensions (Sixty-third and Sixty-fourth Congresses).

Shively came to prominence in the Senate as chairman of the Committee on Foreign Relations. Shively personally advised President Woodrow Wilson on the situation in Mexico during the Mexican Revolution. Shively was a noted political ally and vocal supporter of the Wilson administration.

=== Personal life and death ===
In 1888, Shively married Laura Jenks, daughter of George A. Jenks, the former Solicitor General of the United States under President Grover Cleveland. They had thee children: George, John, and Mary.

Shively was a trustee of Indiana State University in Terre Haute. He was also an Elk.

Shively died in Washington, D.C., and was interred in the Brookville Cemetery, Brookville, Pennsylvania. Vice President Thomas R. Marshall and Second Lady Lois Irene Marshall attended Shively's funeral. President Wilson sent Laura Shively a letter expressing his condolences. Indiana Governor Samuel M. Ralston appointed Thomas Taggart to fill Shively's vacant Senate seat.

== See also ==
- List of members of the United States Congress who died in office (1900–1949)

Party political offices
| Preceded by Claude Matthews | Democratic nominee for Governor of Indiana; 1896 | Succeeded by John W. Kern |
| First | Democratic nominee for U.S. Senator from Indiana (Class 3); 1914 | Succeeded by Thomas Taggart |
U.S. House of Representatives
| Preceded by William H. Calkins | Member of the U.S. House of Representatives from Indiana's 13th congressional district 1884–1885 | Succeeded by George Ford |
| Preceded by George Ford | Member of the U.S. House of Representatives from Indiana's 13th congressional district 1887–1893 | Succeeded by Charles G. Conn |
U.S. Senate
| Preceded by James A. Hemenway | U.S. senator from Indiana; March 4, 1909 – March 14, 1916 | Succeeded by Thomas Taggart |
