= Henry L. Hopkins =

American politician

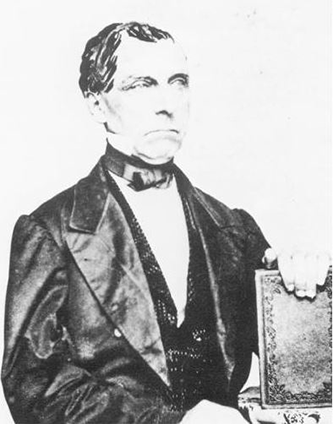
- Portrait of Hopkins (c. 1835)
- Born: 1805; Goochland County, Virginia, U.S.
- Died: 1870 (aged 64–65) near Wilmington, North Carolina, U.S.
- Occupation: Lawyer
- Title: Delegate

Henry Laurens Hopkins (July 12, 1805 – 1870) was a nineteenth century American politician from Virginia.

== Early life ==
Hopkins was born in Goochland County, Virginia, near Goochland Court House, a son of the Episcopal minister Charles Hopkins. He studied law in his home county.

== Career ==
The Virginia Capitol at Richmond VA where 19th century Conventions met

As an adult, Hopkins established a law practice in Powhatan County, Virginia, There he served as a Commonwealth’s Attorney for many years.

Hopkins served as a Delegate in the Virginia Assembly from Powhatan County and was elected Speaker of the House of Delegates 1848-1850. He also served in another Constitutional office as a member of the Council of State and acting Governor for a year. He was succeeded by his brother, George Washington Hopkins of Washington County, Virginia.

In 1850, Hopkins was elected to the Virginia Constitutional Convention of 1850. He was one of three delegates elected from the Southside delegate district made up of his home district of Brunswick County, as well as Lunenburg, Nottoway and Dinwiddie Counties.

Hopkins moved to Petersburg in 1859. During the American Civil War, he served under the Confederate regime as a member of the House of Delegates from 1862 to 1863.

== Death ==
Henry L. Hopkins died in near Wilmington, North Carolina in 1870.

== Bibliography ==
- List of former Speakers of the House of Delegates, in the old House chamber in the Virginia State Capitol
- Pulliam, David Loyd (1901). The Constitutional Conventions of Virginia from the foundation of the Commonwealth to the present time. John T. West, Richmond. ISBN 978-1-2879-2059-5.
