= Stapleton Crutchfield =

Confederate Army officer

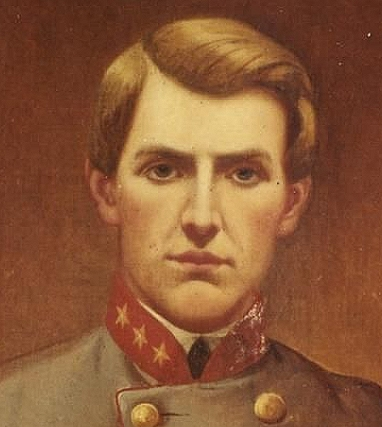
- Stapleton Crutchfield, by William D. Washington
- Born: June 21, 1835; Spotsylvania County, Virginia
- Died: April 6, 1865 (aged 29); Amelia County, Virginia
- Military career
- Allegiance: Confederate States of America
- Branch: Confederate States Army
- Service years: 1861–1865
- Rank: Colonel (CSA)
- Units: 9th Virginia Infantry; 58th Virginia Infantry
- Commands: Artillery / Jackson's Division; Artillery / II Corps, ANV; Artillery Bde. / Department of Richmond
- Conflicts: American Civil War: Valley Campaign (1862); Seven Days Battles; Northern Virginia Campaign; Maryland Campaign; Battle of Fredericksburg; Battle of Chancellorsville; Appomattox Campaign; Battle of Sailor's Creek †

Stapleton Crutchfield (June 21, 1835 – April 6, 1865) was a Confederate officer in the American Civil War closely associated with Stonewall Jackson until Jackson's death. Although Crutchfield lost a leg in the same battle, he returned to field in the last campaign in Virginia, losing his life in the Battle of Sailor's Creek.

== Early and family life and education ==
Stapleton Crutchfield junior was born at "Spring Forest" plantation Spotsylvania County, Virginia on June 21, 1835, to the former Susan Gatewood and her husband, Oscar M. Crutchfield, a planter and justice of the peace who would become a delegate and Speaker of the House of Delegates. He was named to honor his grandfather, Major Stapleton Crutchfield (1776-1818), also an artillery officer and hero in the War of 1812 for his valiant but unsuccessful defense of Hampton. Complicating matters, he also had an uncle of the same name (b. 1808). A more distant ancestor, Robert Sidney, 2nd Earl of Leicester, was said to be one of the most important men in English politics. He had two younger brothers, CSA Lt. Oscar M. Crutchfield and Oscar M. Crutchfield Jr, who survived the war, as did his sister Susan who married Richard L. Maury, likewise of a military family.

Crutchfield attended the Virginia Military Institute, where Thomas J. Jackson was one of his teachers. After graduating with first honors in 1855, Crutchfield stayed on as an instructor of mathematics and tactics. He also served as interim superintendent of the VMI in early 1861, before his father's death in May.

== Civil War ==
After Virginia's declaration of secession, Crutchfield became a drillmaster at the University of Virginia. On July 7, 1861, Crutchfield accepted an appointment as major in the 9th and began training troops on Craney Island, near his grandfather's heroics, but which proved to be mostly garrisoning artillery batteries protecting the Hampton Roads area. During the reorganization following the First Battle of Manassas, Crutchfield secured a transfer (with the same rank) for more active campaigning with the 58th Virginia Infantry Regiments, eventually being promoted to lieutenant colonel, but failed to win re-election on May 1, 1862. Crutchfield had been elected colonel of the 16th Virginia Infantry in early 1862, but declined the position for health reasons.

Instead, on May 5, 1862, Crutchfield became a colonel and Stonewall Jackson's chief of artillery. Jackson's Valley Campaign had begun on April 21, 1862. On May 23, he hurried guns to the front in the Battle of Front Royal, but they were able to do little with the available ordnance. Crutchfield saw service at the First Battle of Winchester on May 25, 1862, including carrying orders to Maj. Gen. Richard S. Ewell. He and his assistant, Edward Willis, were briefly captured on June 8, when a Federal raiding party got into the rear of the Confederate position at Port Republic. Lt. Col. Crutchfield was back on duty the next day at the Battle of Port Republic, directing the guns, having escaped during a melee between his captors and troops from the 37th Virginia Infantry.

Crutchfield participated in the Seven Days Battles with Jackson's command. His artillery was at the head of Jackson's column at the Battle of White Oak Swamp. The fire of his guns drove off federal gunners, permitting the Confederate infantry to cross the swamp, briefly. Union reinforcements, however, forced the Confederates to withdraw.

Crutchfield then served under Jackson at the Battle of Cedar Mountain, the Second Battle of Bull Run, the Battle of Antietam and the Battle of Fredericksburg.

Crutchfield commanded the artillery reserve of Jackson's corps at the Battle of Chancellorsville. He was wounded on May 2, 1863, when he brought up guns to fire on the Union batteries at Hazel Grove, losing a leg as a result. He was in an ambulance when Jackson, wounded by his own men, was placed in it too. At one point Jackson had the ambulance halted to ease his companion's pain.

After recovering from his wound, Col. Crutchfield was assigned to VMI in 1863, then beginning on March 16, 1864, was assigned as an assistant artillery inspector for coastal defenses. Then on January 18, 1865, Crutchfield was again assigned to the Army of Northern Virginia, this time in command artillery units in the defenses of Richmond, Virginia, including the Chaffin's Bluff Defense Line. When the southern army vacated and set fire to the capital city, his gunners became an infantry brigade in the division of Maj. Gen. George Washington Custis Lee.

== Death and legacy ==
Crutchfield died at the Battle of Sayler's Creek on April 6, 1865, shot in the head while leading an attack on the Union VI Corps. His body was buried on the field and not recovered. Opinions of Crutchfield varied. Edward Porter Alexander thought him a candidate for promotion to brigadier general before the leg was lost, but Campbell Brown thought him "competent but lazy". A recent writer has opined that Jackson tolerated Crutchfield's tendency to sleep late because of his abilities.
