= Andrew J. Hickey =

American politician

Andrew Hickey
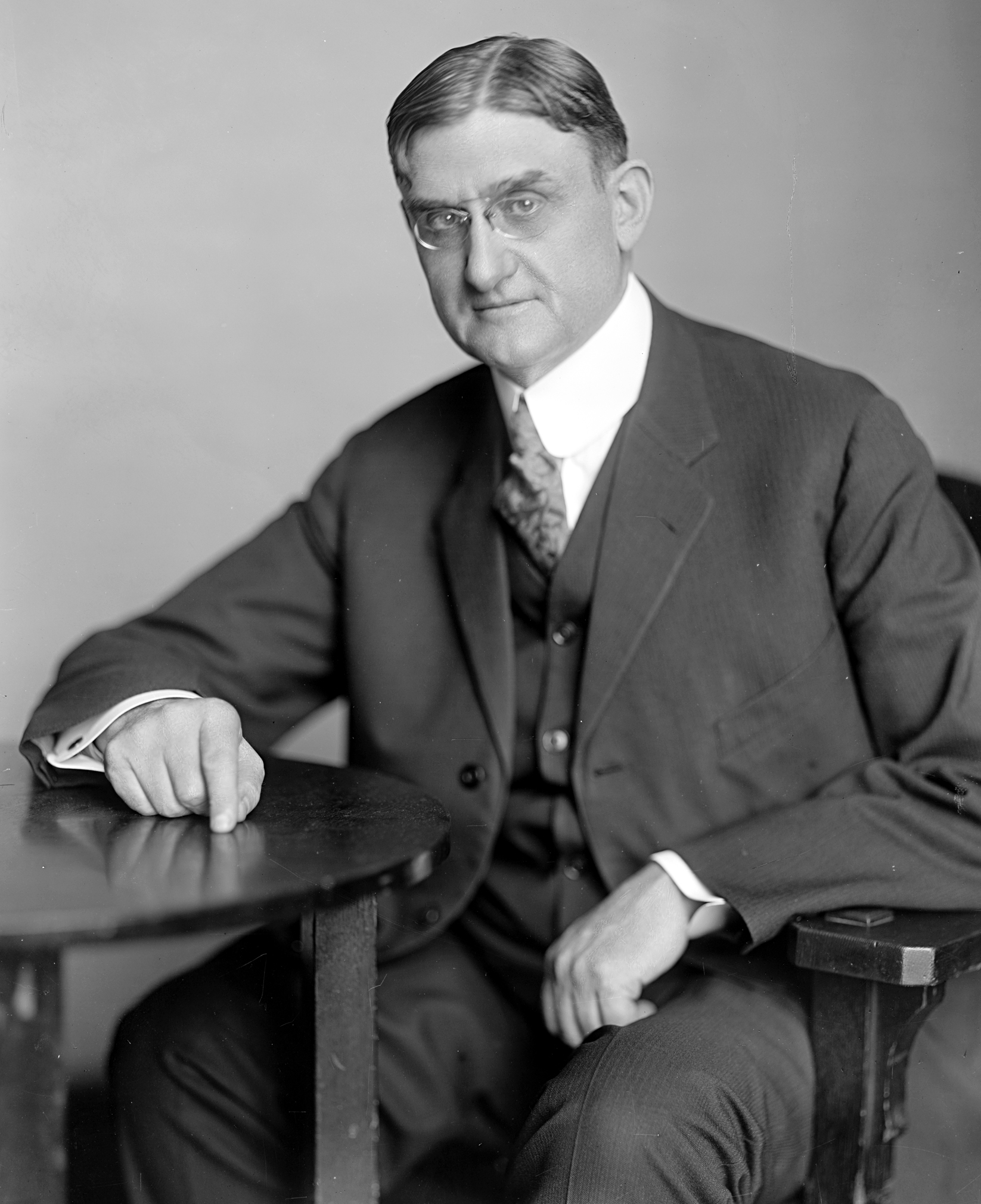

Member of the U.S. House of Representatives from Indiana's 13th district
- In office March 4, 1919 – March 3, 1931
- Preceded by: Henry A. Barnhart
- Succeeded by: Samuel B. Pettengill

Personal details
- Born: August 27, 1872 Albion, New York, U.S.
- Died: August 20, 1942 (aged 69) Buffalo, New York, U.S
- Party: Republican
- Education: University at Buffalo Law School

Andrew James Hickey (August 27, 1872 – August 20, 1942) was an American lawyer and politician who served six terms as a U.S. representative from Indiana from 1919 to 1931.

== Biography ==
Born in Albion, New York, Hickey attended the public schools of his native city and Buffalo (New York) Law School. He was admitted to the New York bar in 1896 and commenced practice in La Porte, Indiana, in 1897.

=== Congress ===
Hickey was elected as a Republican to the Sixty-sixth and to the five succeeding Congresses (March 4, 1919 – March 3, 1931). He was an unsuccessful candidate for reelection in 1930 to the Seventy-second Congress, for election in 1934 to the Seventy-fourth Congress, and in 1936 to the Seventy-fifth Congress.

=== Later career and death ===
He resumed the practice of law. He died in Buffalo, New York, August 20, 1942, while on a motor trip. He was interred in Pine Lake Cemetery, La Porte, Indiana. Hickey had one brother, New York politician and judge William J. Hickey, who outlived him by a decade.

U.S. House of Representatives
Preceded by Henry A. Barnhart	Member of the U.S. House of Representatives from Indiana's 13th congressional district 1919-1931	Succeeded by Samuel B. Pettengill
