= Abraham L. Brick =

American politician (1860–1908)

Abraham Lincoln Brick
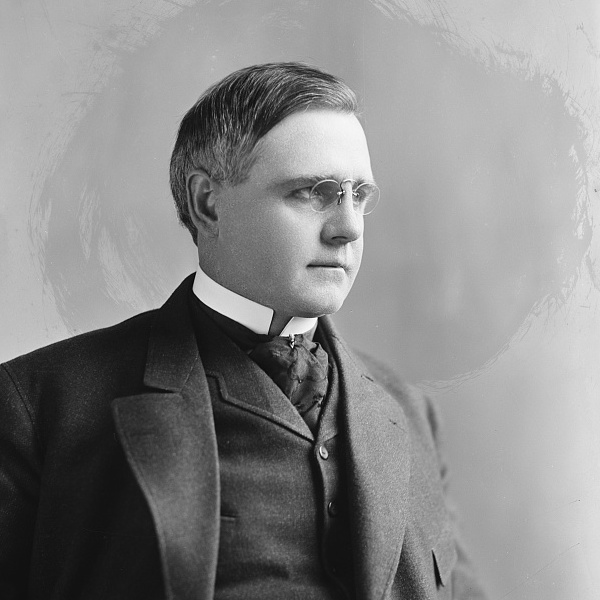

Member of the U.S. House of Representatives from Indiana's 13th district
- In office March 4, 1899 – April 7, 1908
- Preceded by: Lemuel W. Royse
- Succeeded by: Henry A. Barnhart

Personal details
- Born: May 27, 1860 South Bend, Indiana, U.S.
- Died: April 7, 1908 (aged 47) Indianapolis, Indiana, U.S.
- Resting place: Riverview Cemetery; South Bend, Indiana, U.S.
- Party: Republican
- Education: Cornell University; Yale University
- Alma mater: University of Michigan at Ann Arbor
- Occupation: Attorney

Abraham Lincoln Brick (May 27, 1860 – April 7, 1908) was an American attorney and politician. He served five terms in the United States House of Representatives from 1899 until his death in 1908.

== Early life and education ==
Abraham Lincoln Brick was born on his father's farm, near South Bend, St. Joseph County, Indiana, on May 27, 1860. Brick attended the common schools and was graduated from the South Bend High School. He later attended Cornell University and Yale University, and graduated from the law department of the University of Michigan at Ann Arbor in 1883.

== Career and life ==
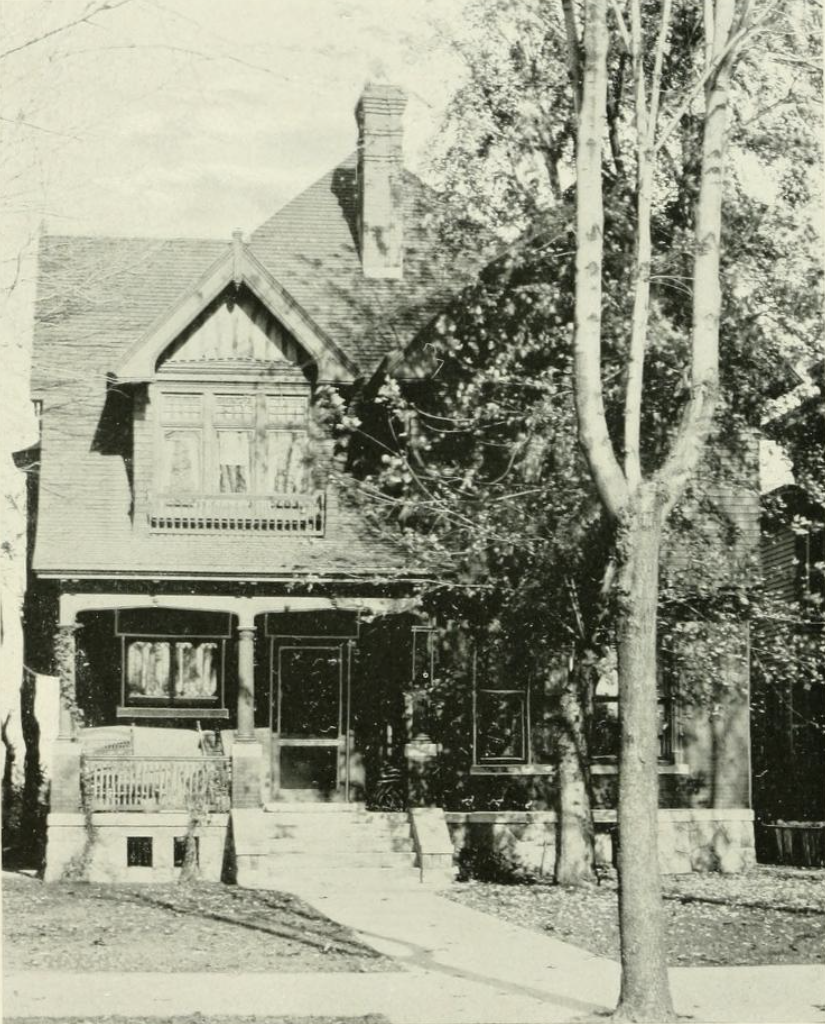
Home of Brick in South Bend (c. 1901)

He was admitted to the bar the same year and commenced practice in South Bend, St. Joseph County, Indiana. He served as prosecuting attorney for the counties of St. Joseph and La Porte in 1886 and delegate to the Republican National Convention in 1896.

=== Politics ===
Brick was elected as a Republican to the Fifty-Sixth and to the four succeeding Congresses and served from March 4, 1899, until his death.

== Death and legacy ==
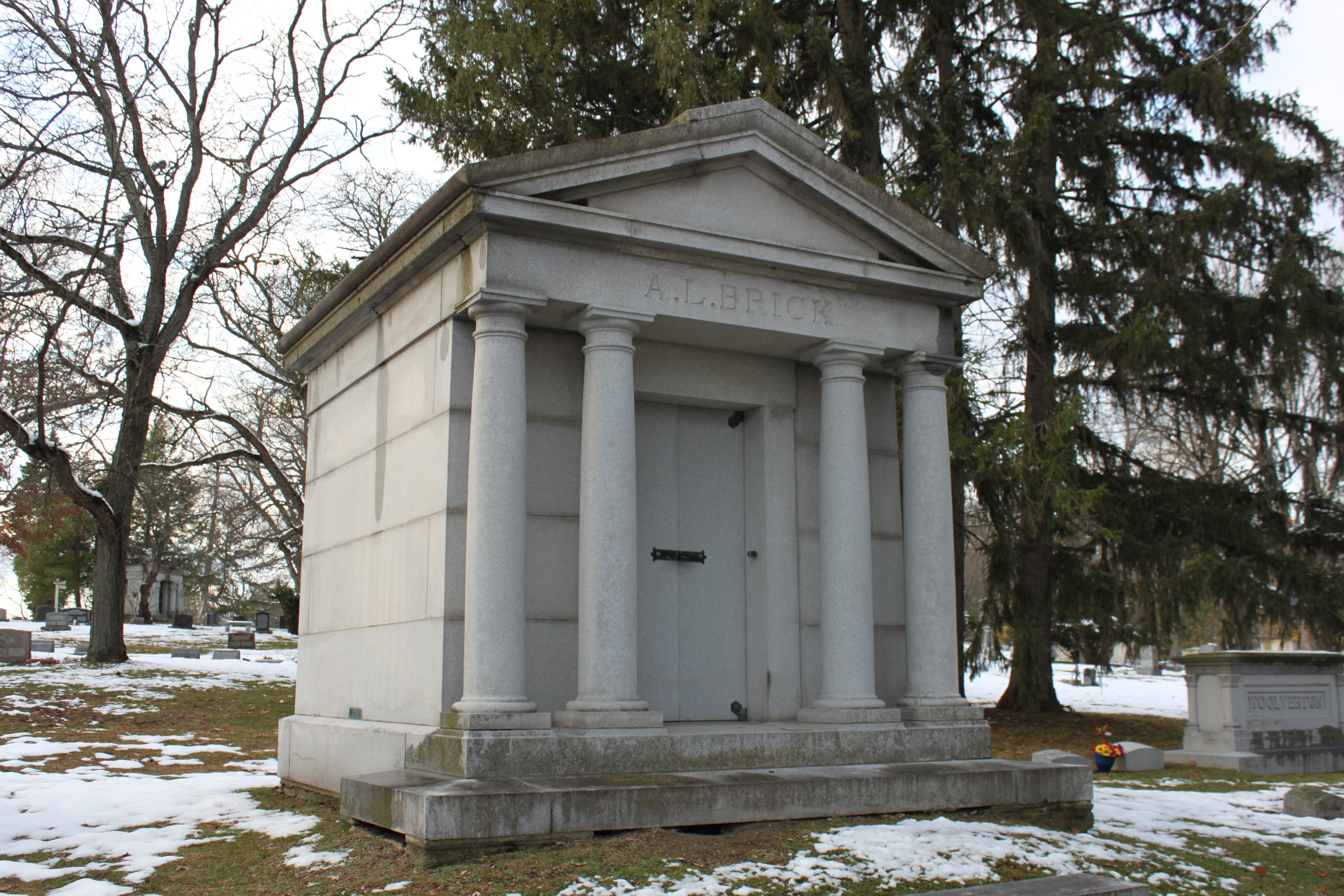
Brick Mausoleum in Riverview Cemetery

Brick died in Indianapolis, Indiana, on April 7, 1908. He was interred in Riverview Cemetery in South Bend.

Brick's papers are held in the collection of the Indiana State Library.

== See also ==
- List of members of the United States Congress who died in office (1900–1949)

U.S. House of Representatives
Preceded by Lemuel W. Royse	Member of the U.S. House of Representatives from Indiana's 13th congressional district 1899-1908	Succeeded by Henry A. Barnhart
