= Samuel B. Pettengill =

American politician

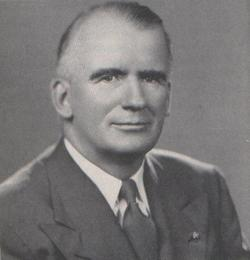

Member of the U.S. House of Representatives from Indiana
- In office March 4, 1931 – January 3, 1939
- Preceded by: Andrew J. Hickey (13th); Eugene B. Crowe (3rd)
- Succeeded by: District eliminated (13th); Robert A. Grant (3rd)
- Constituency: 13th district (1931-33); 3rd district (1933-39)

Personal details
- Born: January 19, 1886 Portland, Oregon, USA
- Died: March 20, 1974 (aged 88) Springfield, Vermont, USA
- Party: Democratic Party
- Spouse(s): Josephine Campbell (1912-1948) (her death) (1 child); Helen M. Charles (1949-1974) (his death)
- Children: Susan
- Education: Yale University
- Occupation: Lawyer

Samuel Barrett Pettengill (January 19, 1886 – March 20, 1974) was a U.S. representative from Indiana, representing Indiana's 3rd congressional district and nephew of William Horace Clagett.

== Early life ==
Pettengill was born January 19, 1886, in Portland, Oregon, the second son of Samuel Barrett and Susan Clagett Pettengill. After his mother's death in 1890, the family moved to Vermont in 1892, and lived on the ancestral farm settled by his great-grandfather in 1787 in Grafton, Windham County, Vermont. He attended common schools. He graduated from Vermont Academy at Saxtons River, Vermont, in 1904, from Middlebury College, Middlebury, Vermont, in 1908, and from the law department of Yale University in 1911. He was admitted to the bar in 1912 and commenced practice in South Bend, Indiana.

He was a member of the Bar of the Supreme Court of Indiana and the United States Supreme Court. He was the recipient of honorary degrees from Harding, Franklin, Marietta and Middlebury Colleges and Norwich University. He served as member of the board of education of South Bend from 1926 to 1928. On June 1, 1912, Mr. Pettengill married Josephine Campbell of Napoleon, Ohio, who died on June 26, 1948. They had one daughter, Susan, (Mrs. Thomas B. Douglas), who lives in Washington, D.C. On July 16, 1949, he married Helen M. Charles, of New York City. He was a Congregationalist and a member of the Grafton Church in Grafton, Vermont all his life.

== Politics ==
Pettengill was elected as a Democrat to the Seventy-second and to the three succeeding Congresses (March 4, 1931 – January 3, 1939). Pettengill was first elected to represent Indiana's 13th congressional district, which was eliminated as a result of the 1930 Census, at which time Pettengill was redistricted into Indiana's 3rd congressional district. During his time in Congress he served on committees on military affairs, interstate and foreign commerce and helped formulate much influential legislation. He was influential in the enactment of the Connolly Hot Oil Act and the formulation of the Interstate Oil Compact. As a member of the House Committee on Interstate and Foreign Commerce, Mr. Pettengill helped formulate the Securities Act, the Motor Carriers Act, the Stock Exchange Act, the National Gas Act and other legislation dealing with railroads, commodity exchanges, public utilities, aviation and the Panama Canal. He became widely known because of his activities in the defeat of the Supreme Court Packing Bill and the Reorganization Bill during the presidency of Franklin D. Roosevelt. He was not a candidate for renomination in 1938 to the Seventy-sixth Congress. He then resumed practicing law.

== Other work ==
His first book, Hot Oil, published in 1936, summarized the arguments pro and con in reference to the question of federal control or nationalization of the petroleum industry. Pettengill favored state rather than federal regulation and the highest degree of industrial freedom consistent with the conservation of national petroleum resources. In 1939, he wrote Jefferson, The Forgotten Man, to show how far the principles of Thomas Jefferson had been discarded. He worked as a newspaper columnist 1939–1948. A strong critic of numerous New Deal policies, he was Chairman of the "No Third Term" campaign meeting at Carnegie Hall in 1940. He was elected Chairman of the Republican National Finance Committee in 1942.

He served as vice president and general counsel of the Transportation Association of America from 1943 to 1945. He resigned early in 1944 to devote more of his time to his law practice, writing and speaking. In 1947 and 1948, he spoke on public affairs every Sunday afternoon over the American Broadcasting System. Since leaving Congress, he had been writing a twice-a-week column as "The Gentleman From Indiana," syndicated to over 100 newspapers all over the country.

In 1940 he wrote, Smoke Screen to show that the increasing federal controls over every facet of American business had its counterpart in developments in Germany and Italy. Smoke Screen was the best-selling non-fiction book of that year. For Americans Only, published in 1944, brought the same theme up to date. He was a practicing attorney for the Pure Oil Company, Chicago, Illinois, from 1949 to 1956. He was a consultant for the Coe Foundation from 1956 to 1965.

== Retirement ==
He retired from public life on July 1, 1956, and moved back to Vermont, where he continued to engage in writing and speaking in defense of constitutional government and the competitive free enterprise system. After retirement he taught American history at a variety of colleges in the Vermont area. He was a trustee of the Vermont Historical Society and was one of the founders of the Grafton Historical Society in 1962 and its president for the next ten years.

His intense interest in the early history of Vermont and its settlers led him to write his fifth book, The Yankee Pioneers--A Saga of Courage, published in 1971. He was a 33rd Degree Mason, Master of Lodge # 294 and past deputy Grand Master of the Indiana Grand Lodge. In 1973, he received a citation and a medal of honor from the Masons in recognition of distinguished service to the craft.

He continued to live at his boyhood farm in Vermont until his death in Springfield, Vermont, March 20, 1974. He was interred in Grafton Village Cemetery, Grafton, Vermont.

His autobiography, My Story, edited by his wife Helen, was published posthumously in 1979.

U.S. House of Representatives
| Preceded by Andrew J. Hickey | Member of the U.S. House of Representatives from Indiana's 13th congressional district 1931-1933 | Succeeded by District inactive |
| Preceded by Eugene B. Crowe | Member of the U.S. House of Representatives from Indiana's 3rd congressional district 1933-1939 | Succeeded by Robert A. Grant |
