= George Washington Hopkins =

American politician

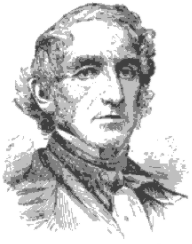
- Portrait of Hopkins in 1893 book

Member of the U.S. House of Representatives from Virginia
- In office March 4, 1835 – March 3, 1847
- Preceded by: John H. Fulton (18th); LaFayette McMullen (13th)
- Succeeded by: District eliminated (18th); Elbert S. Martin (13th)
- Constituency: 18th district (1835-43); 13th district (1843-47)
- In office March 4, 1857 – March 3, 1859
- Preceded by: Fayette McMullen
- Succeeded by: Elbert S. Martin
- Constituency: 13th district

Chairman of the House Committee on Foreign Affairs
- In office 1858–1859
- Preceded by: Thomas Lanier Clingman
- Succeeded by: Thomas Corwin

Chairman of the House Committee on Post Office and Post Roads
- In office 1843 – 1847
- Preceded by: George N. Briggs
- Succeeded by: William L. Goggin

United States Chargé d'Affaires to Portugal
- In office November 4, 1847 – October 18, 1849
- President: James K. Polk
- Preceded by: Abraham Rencher
- Succeeded by: James Brown Clay

Speaker of the Virginia House of Delegates
- In office 1850 – 1852
- Preceded by: Henry L. Hopkins
- Succeeded by: Oscar M. Crutchfield

Member of the Virginia House of Delegates
- In office 1833 – 1835
- In office 1850–1852
- In office 1860–1861

Personal details
- Born: February 22, 1804 Goochland County, Virginia
- Died: March 1, 1861 (aged 57) Richmond, Virginia
- Resting place: Sinking Spring Cemetery, Abingdon, Virginia
- Party: Democratic (1837–1839; after 1841); Conservative (1839–1841); Jacksonian (1835–1837)
- Education: Hampden-Sydney College

George Washington Hopkins (February 22, 1804 – March 1, 1861) was a nineteenth-century United States politician, diplomat, lawyer, judge and teacher.

== Biography ==
Born in Goochland County, Virginia near Goochland Court House to the Episcopal minister Charles Hopkins, Hopkins attended the common schools as a child. He later taught school, studied law and was admitted to the bar in 1834, commencing practice in Lebanon, Virginia. He was a member of the Virginia House of Delegates from 1833 to 1835 and was elected a Jacksonian Democrat and Conservative to the United States House of Representatives in 1834, serving from 1835 to 1847. There, Hopkins served as chairman of the Committee on Post Office and Post Roads from 1843 to 1847.

President James Knox Polk appointed Hopkins as Chargé d'affaires to Portugal in 1847; he served as until 1849. He returned to the House of Delegates as Speaker succeeding his brother Henry L. Hopkins from 1850 to 1852 and was a member of the Virginia Constitutional Convention in 1850 and 1851. He served as judge of the circuit court of Washington, D.C. and other counties and was elected back to the House of Representatives in 1856, serving again from 1857 to 1859. There, he served as chairman of the Committee on Foreign Affairs from 1857 to 1859. He was not a candidate for reelection in 1858 and resumed practicing law in Abingdon, Virginia.

Hopkins served in the House of Delegates for a third time from 1859 until his death in Richmond, Virginia on March 1, 1861. He was interred in Sinking Spring Cemetery in Abingdon.

U.S. House of Representatives
Preceded by John H. Fulton	Member of the U.S. House of Representatives from Virginia's 18th congressional district 1835 – 1843	Succeeded by Constituency abolished
Preceded by William Smith	Member of the U.S. House of Representatives from Virginia's 13th congressional district 1843 – 1847	Succeeded by Andrew S. Fulton
Preceded by LaFayette McMullen	Member of the U.S. House of Representatives from Virginia's 13th congressional district 1857 – 1859	Succeeded by Elbert S. Martin
Diplomatic posts
Preceded by Abraham Rencher	Chargé d'Affaires to Portugal; 1847 – 1849	Succeeded by James Brown Clay
Political offices
Preceded by Henry L. Hopkins	Speaker of the Virginia House of Delegates; 1850 – 1852	Succeeded by Oscar M. Crutchfield
