= George Ford (American politician) =

American politician (1846–1917)

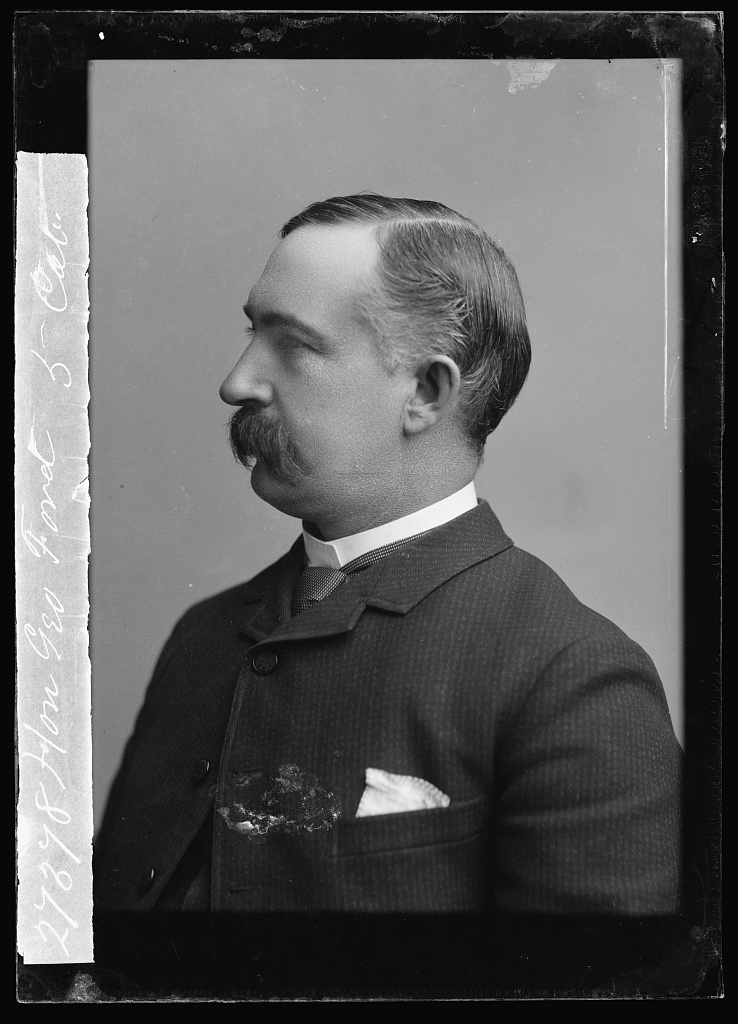

Member of the U.S. House of Representatives from Indiana's 13th district
- In office March 4, 1885 – March 3, 1887
- Preceded by: Benjamin F. Shively
- Succeeded by: Benjamin F. Shively

Personal details
- Born: January 11, 1846 South Bend, St. Joseph County, Indiana, U.S.
- Died: August 30, 1917 (aged 71) South Bend, Indiana, U.S.
- Resting place: Riverview Cemetery
- Party: Democratic
- Education: University of Michigan at Ann Arbor

George Ford (January 11, 1846 – August 30, 1917) was an American lawyer and politician who served one term as a U.S. representative from Indiana from 1885 to 1887.

== Biography ==
Born in South Bend, St. Joseph County, Indiana, Ford attended the common schools. He engaged in the cooper's trade in early youth. He entered the law department of the University of Michigan at Ann Arbor, and was graduated from that institution in 1869. He was immediately admitted to the bar and commenced practice in South Bend.

He served as prosecuting attorney of St. Joseph County in 1873 and 1875–1884.

=== Congress ===
Ford was elected as a Democrat to the Forty-ninth Congress (March 4, 1885 – March 3, 1887). He declined to be a candidate for reelection in 1886 to the Fiftieth Congress.

=== Later career and death ===
He became the head of the legal department of an implement concern, but subsequently resumed the private practice of his profession in South Bend.

Ford was elected judge of the superior court of St. Joseph County in 1914.

He died in South Bend, on August 30, 1917. He was interred in Riverview Cemetery.

U.S. House of Representatives
Preceded by Benjamin F. Shively	Member of the U.S. House of Representatives from Indiana's 13th congressional district 1885–1887	Succeeded by Benjamin F. Shively
