= Andrew S. Fulton =

American politician and judge (1800–1884)

Member of the U.S. House of Representatives from Virginia's 13th district
- In office March 4, 1847 – March 3, 1849
- Preceded by: George W. Hopkins
- Succeeded by: LaFayette McMullen

Member of the Virginia House of Delegates from the Wythe County district
- In office 1840–1840
- In office 1845–1845

Personal details
- Born: September 29, 1800 near Waynesboro, Virginia, U.S.
- Died: November 22, 1884 (aged 84) near Austinville, Virginia, U.S.
- Resting place: near Austinville, Virginia, U.S.
- Party: Whig
- Spouse: Sarah M. Kincannon (m. 1828)
- Children: 9
- Relatives: John H. Fulton (brother)
- Occupation: Politician; lawyer; judge

Andrew Steele Fulton (September 29, 1800 – November 22, 1884) was a nineteenth-century congressman, lawyer and judge from Virginia. He was the brother of John H. Fulton.

== Early life ==
Andrew Steele Fulton was born on September 29, 1800, near Waynesboro, Virginia. He attended common schools as a child and went on to attend Hampden-Sydney College. He read law in the office of Briscoe Baldwin in Staunton, Virginia, and was admitted to the bar in 1825.

== Career ==
Fulton commenced practice with his brother John H. Fulton in Abingdon in 1826. He moved to Wytheville in 1828 and became a member of the Virginia House of Delegates, representing Wythe County in 1840 and 1845. Fulton became prosecuting attorney of Wythe County and was elected a Whig to the United States House of Representatives in 1846, serving from 1847 to 1849. There, he was chairman of the Committee on Invalid Pensions from 1847 to 1849. He was not a candidate for reelection and instead continued to practice law. He served as judge of the fifteenth judicial circuit of Virginia from 1852 to 1869.

Fulton operated a leadworks facility that produced US$9,000 worth of lead products in 1860. He also ran a farm that produced corn and wheat. He sold the farm in 1875.

== Personal life ==
Fulton married Sarah "Sallie" M. Kincannon in 1828. He had nine children. In 1852, they purchased land near Austinville and built a farmhouse there.

Fulton died on November 22, 1884, near Austinville, and was interred in the family cemetery by New River near Austinville.

U.S. House of Representatives
| Preceded by George W. Hopkins | Member of the U.S. House of Representatives from Virginia's 13th congressional district March 4, 1847 – March 3, 1849 (obsolete district) | Succeeded by LaFayette McMullen |
