= Fayette McMullen =

2nd Territorial Governor of Washington

LaFayette McMullen
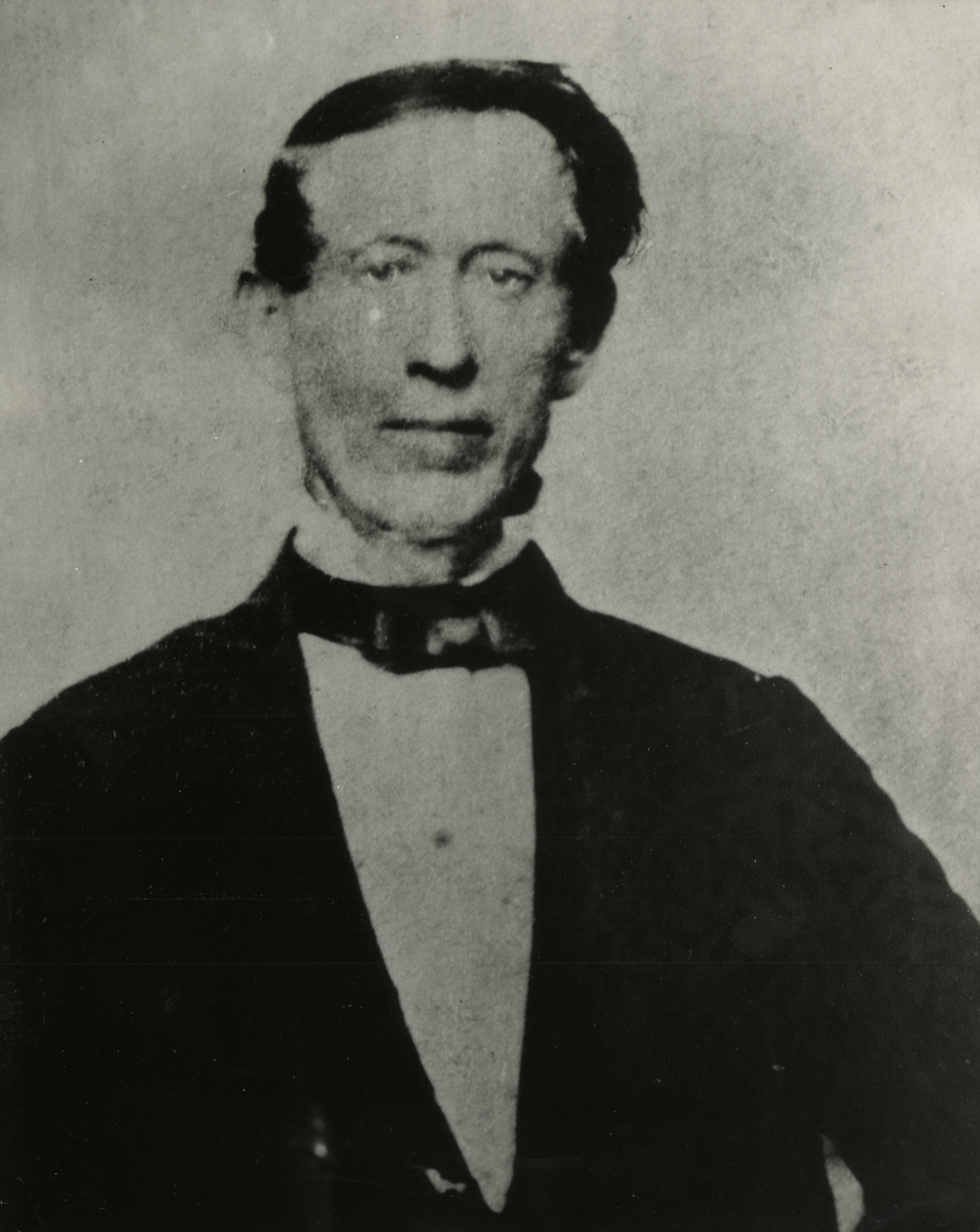

2nd Governor of Washington Territory
- In office September 10, 1857 – July 15, 1859
- Preceded by: Isaac Stevens
- Succeeded by: Richard D. Gholson

Member of the U.S. House of Representatives from Virginia's 13th district
- In office March 4, 1849 – March 4, 1857
- Preceded by: Andrew S. Fulton
- Succeeded by: George W. Hopkins

Member of the Virginia Senate
- In office 1839–1849

Personal details
- Born: May 18, 1805 Estillville, Virginia, US
- Died: November 8, 1880 (aged 75) Wytheville, Virginia, US
- Party: Democratic
- Spouse: Mary Wood McMullen
- Profession: Politician, driver, teamster, banker

LaFayette "Fayette" McMullen (May 18, 1805 – November 8, 1880) was a 19th-century politician, driver, teamster and banker from the U.S. state of Virginia and the second appointed governor of Washington Territory.

== Early life and family ==
Born in Estillville, Virginia, McMullen attended private schools as a child. He was a Virginia driver and teamster, working in the family owned business and driving a coach. He married Mary (Polly) Wood, daughter of the sheriff, in 1826. They had no children.

== Career ==
McMullen became a member of the Senate of Virginia in 1839, serving until 1849. He was elected as a Democrat to the United States House of Representatives in 1848, serving from 1849 to 1857. There, McMullen served as chairman of the Committee on Expenditures in the Department of the Navy from 1851 to 1855 and chairman of the Committee on Expenditures on Public Buildings from 1855 to 1857. McMullen was a delegate to the Democratic National Convention in 1852 and 1856.

McMullen was appointed by President James Buchanan, as Territorial Governor of Washington in 1857, serving until 1859.

McMullen was elected as a Democrat to the Confederate House of Representatives in 1863, serving from 1864 until the crumbling of the Confederacy in 1865. Afterwards, he engaged in agricultural and banking pursuits and unsuccessfully ran for Governor of Virginia in 1878.

== Death ==
McMullen died in a train accident on November 8, 1880, in Wytheville, Virginia, and is interred at Round Hill Cemetery in Marion, Virginia.

U.S. House of Representatives
Preceded by Andrew S. Fulton	Member of the U.S. House of Representatives from Virginia's 13th congressional district March 4, 1849 – March 3, 1857 (obsolete district)	Succeeded by George W. Hopkins
Political offices
Preceded by Isaac Stevens	Territorial Governor of Washington; 1857–1859	Succeeded by Richard D. Gholson
Confederate States House of Representatives
Preceded by Walter Preston	Member of the C.S. House of Representatives from Virginia; February 18, 1864 – May 10, 1865	Succeeded by (none)
