= Charles Gerard Conn Mansion =

Historic house in Indiana, United States

- U.S. National Register of Historic Places
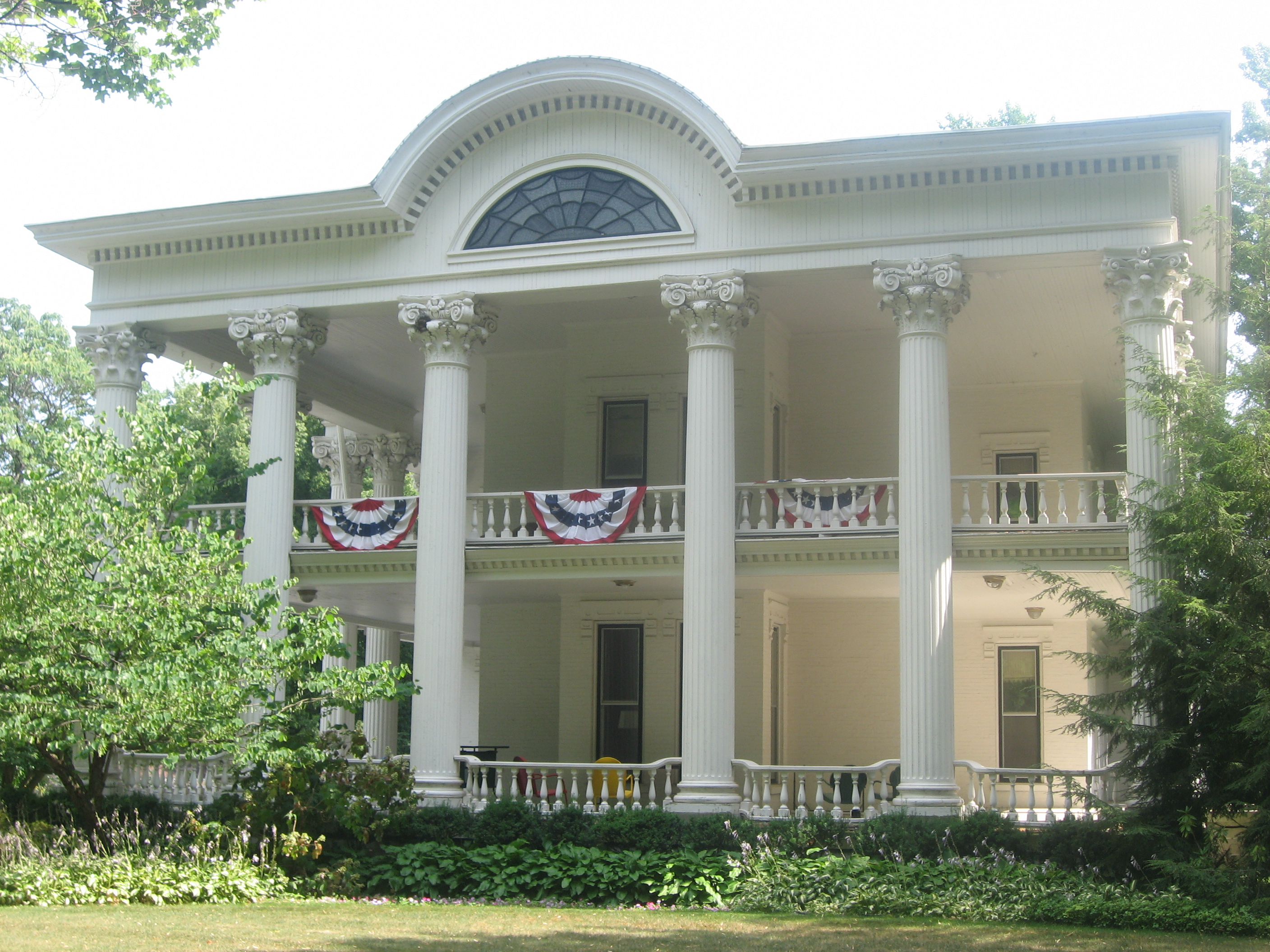
- Charles Gerard Conn Mansion, July 2012

- Location within Indiana Location within the United States
- Location: 723 Strong Ave., Elkhart, Indiana
- Coordinates: 41°41′7″N 85°59′11″W
- Area: 3.3 acres (1.3 ha)
- Built: 1884
- Architect: Ellwood, A.H. & Son; Welter, L.H.
- Architectural style: Italianate, Classical Revival
- NRHP reference No.: 07001278
- Added to NRHP: December 19, 2007

Charles Gerard Conn Mansion, also known as the Strong-Conn Mansion, is a historic home located at Elkhart, Elkhart County, Indiana. It was built in 1884, and is a two-story, Italianate style painted brick mansion. It features a two-story, Classical Revival style wraparound porch supported by 17 pillars and two-story projecting front bay. It was the home of musical instrument manufacturer C.G. Conn (1884–1931).

It was added to the National Register of Historic Places in 2007.
