= John H. Fulton =

American politician (1792-1836)

Member of the U.S. House of Representatives from Virginia's 18th district
- In office March 4, 1833 – March 3, 1835
- Preceded by: Joseph Johnson
- Succeeded by: George W. Hopkins

Member of the Virginia Senate from Washington, Lee, Scott, Russell, and Tazewell Counties
- In office 1828 – 1830
- Preceded by: John D. Sharp
- Succeeded by: Constituency abolished

Member of the Virginia House of Delegates from Washington County
- In office 1822 – 1824

Personal details
- Born: 1792 Augusta County, Virginia, US
- Died: January 28, 1836 (aged 43–44) Abingdon, Virginia, US
- Resting place: Sinking Spring Cemetery, Abingdon, Virginia
- Party: Jacksonian
- Education: Hampden-Sydney College

John Hall Fulton (1792 – January 28, 1836) was a nineteenth-century politician and lawyer from Virginia. He was the brother of Andrew S. Fulton.

== Biography ==
Born in Augusta County, Virginia, Fulton attended common schools as a child and went on to graduate from Hampden-Sydney College. He studied law and was admitted to the bar, commencing practice in Abingdon, Virginia. He was a member of the Virginia House of Delegates in 1823 and 1824 and the Virginia Senate from 1829 to 1831. Fulton was elected a Jacksonian to the United States House of Representatives in 1832, serving from 1833 to 1835, being unsuccessful for reelection in 1834. He ran for the House again in 1836, but died before the election on January 28, 1836, in Abingdon, Virginia. He was interred in Sinking Spring Cemetery in Abingdon.

U.S. House of Representatives
Preceded by Joseph Johnson	Member of the U.S. House of Representatives from Virginia's 18th congressional district 1833 – 1835	Succeeded by George W. Hopkins
