= Indiana's 13th congressional district =

Former U.S. House district from 1873 to 1933

- Obsolete district
- Created: 1875
- Eliminated: 1930
- Years active: 1875–1933

Indiana's 13th congressional district was a congressional district for the United States House of Representatives in Indiana. It was eliminated as a result of the 1930 census. It was last represented by Samuel B. Pettengill who was redistricted into the 3rd district.

== List of members representing the district ==
Member	Party	Years	Cong ress	Electoral history
District created March 4, 1875
John Baker (Goshen)	Republican	March 4, 1875 – March 3, 1881	44th 45th 46th	Elected in 1874. Re-elected in 1876. Re-elected in 1878. Retired.
William H. Calkins (Laporte)	Republican	March 4, 1881 – October 20, 1884	47th 48th	Redistricted from the 10th district and re-elected in 1880. Re-elected in 1882. Retired to run for governor and resigned.
Vacant		October 20, 1884 – December 1, 1884	48th	
Benjamin F. Shively (South Bend)	Anti-Monopolist	December 1, 1884 – March 3, 1885	48th	Elected to finish Calkins's term. Was not candidate for full term.
George Ford (South Bend)	Democratic	March 4, 1885 – March 3, 1887	49th	Elected in 1884. Retired.
Benjamin F. Shively (South Bend)	Democratic	March 4, 1887 – March 3, 1893	50th 51st 52nd	Elected in 1886. Re-elected in 1888. Re-elected in 1890. Retired.
Charles G. Conn (Elkhart)	Democratic	March 4, 1893 – March 3, 1895	53rd	Elected in 1892. Retired.
Lemuel W. Royse (Warsaw)	Republican	March 4, 1895 – March 3, 1899	54th 55th	Elected in 1894. Re-elected in 1896. Lost renomination.
Abraham L. Brick (South Bend)	Republican	March 4, 1899 – April 7, 1908	56th 57th 58th 59th 60th	Elected in 1898. Re-elected in 1900. Re-elected in 1902. Re-elected in 1904. Re-elected in 1906. Died.
Vacant		April 7, 1908 – November 3, 1908	60th	
Henry A. Barnhart (Rochester)	Democratic	November 3, 1908 – March 3, 1919	60th 61st 62nd 63rd 64th 65th	Elected to finish Brick's term. Re-elected in 1908. Re-elected in 1910. Re-elected in 1912. Re-elected in 1914. Re-elected in 1916. Lost re-election.
Andrew J. Hickey (La Porte)	Republican	March 4, 1919 – March 3, 1931	66th 67th 68th 69th 70th 71st	Elected in 1918. Re-elected in 1920. Re-elected in 1922. Re-elected in 1924. Re-elected in 1926. Re-elected in 1928. Lost re-election.
Samuel B. Pettengill (South Bend)	Democratic	March 4, 1931 – March 3, 1933	72nd	Elected in 1930. Redistricted to the 3rd district.
District eliminated March 4, 1933
