= Richard D. Gholson =

American lawyer and politician (1804–1862)

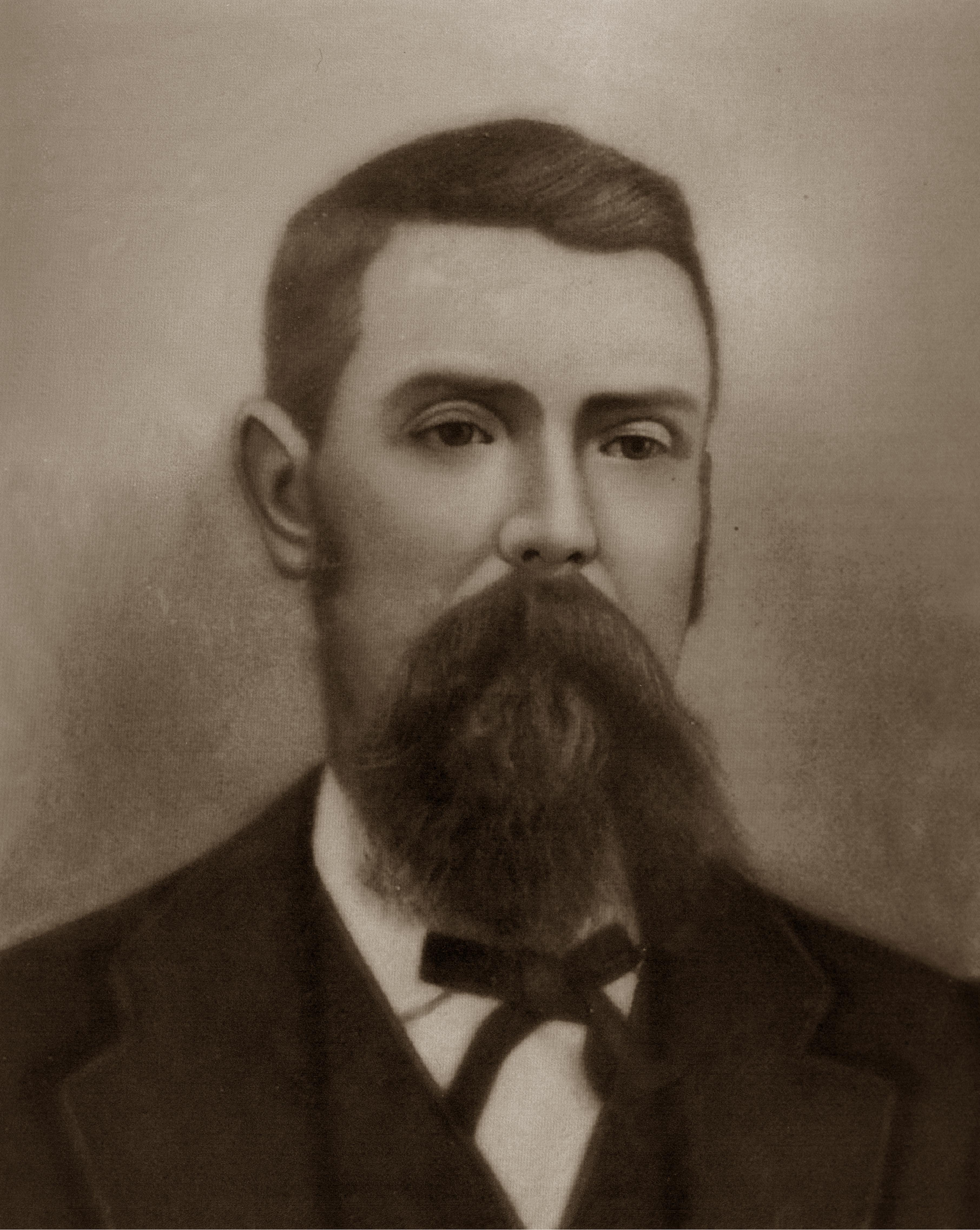

3rd Governor of Washington Territory
- In office March 5, 1859 – March 4, 1861
- Appointed by: James Buchanan
- Preceded by: Fayette McMullen
- Succeeded by: William H. Wallace

Member of the Kentucky Senate from the 1st district
- In office August 4, 1851 – August 6, 1855
- Preceded by: John Eaker
- Succeeded by: George W. Silvertooth

Personal details
- Born: Richard Dickerson Gholson; January 31, 1804 Caldwell County, Kentucky
- Died: August 23, 1862 (aged 58) Troy, Tennessee
- Party: Democratic
- Spouse: Mary Jane Martin
- Profession: Politician, lawyer

Richard Dickerson Gholson (January 31, 1804 – August 23, 1862) was an American lawyer and politician who served as the 3rd territorial governor of Washington.

== Biography ==
Born in Garrard County, Kentucky, Gholson was the son of William J. Gholson and "Polly" Mary Jarrell. He settled on Humphrey's Creek in the area of Lovelaceville, Kentucky, which had been recently settled by Andrew Lovelace in 1820. He was married in Hickman County, Kentucky, to Mary Jane Morrison Martin on April 15, 1826. Gholson studied law and became a lawyer with a practice in Kentucky.

He served as a captain with the U.S. Volunteers during the war with Mexico. On June 26, 1846, he was appointed Assistant Commissary of Subsistence, U.S. Volunteers, with the rank of captain. On July 31, 1846, he accepted that appointment at Paducah, Kentucky, US. On August 26, 1846, he joined the 2nd Kentucky Infantry and served in the Mexican War. In October 1846, he was known to be at Round Rock, Williamson County, Texas, US. In December 1846, he was at Corpus Christi, Nueces County, Texas, US. On June 30, 1847, he was honourably discharged from military service.

His experience during the war with Mexico led him to purchase a sizable ranch in Texas, in addition to his substantial land holdings in Kentucky. He could not convince his wife to move to the Texas frontier.

He was a member of the Kentucky Senate from 1851 to 1855 and represented Ballard and McCracken Counties in the framing of a new constitution for Kentucky.

Gholson was an ardent supporter of President James Buchanan and campaigned throughout the state of Kentucky for him in his race for president. Buchanan later appointed him governor of the Washington Territory, and he served from July 1859 until 1861 when he resigned and returned to Kentucky due to the unrest that led up to the Civil War.

At the onset of the Civil War, Gholson moved from Kentucky across the state line into Tennessee "for greater protection of his family and slaves." This was apparently a fairly common practice during that time. The Woodville Cavalry, Woodville, McCracken County, Kentucky, was commissioned on April 23, 1861. Its officers were: R. D. Gholson, captain; W. W. Faulkner, first lieutenant; R. S. Hill, second lieutenant; and W. S. Gholson, third lieutenant.

Gholson died in Troy, Tennessee, on August 23, 1862. His death resulted from injuries suffered from being thrown against a tree by a runaway team of horses pulling a wagon. Some believe that his body was taken back to Kentucky for burial, while others believe he was buried on his Texas ranch, but the burial spot remains unknown.

For over a century it was believed that no portrait of Gholson existed. In 2006, Jewell Dunn, a volunteer at the Washington State Archives located Gholson family members who had chalk pastel portrait of Gholson. An electronic image of the portrait is available online at the Washington State Digital Archives.

His wife Mary died in Ballard County, Kentucky, on October 19, 1883.

Family correspondence suggest that Gholson and his wife had eleven children. Census records suggests they may have had as many as 13 children:

1. Mary Agnes Gholson, born April 23, 1827
2. Frederick Martin Gholson, born April 10, 1829
3. Daniel Burdine Gholson, born September 21, 1831 (Twin child)
4. Elizabeth Angelline Gholson, born September 21, 1831 (Twin child)
5. Richard Dickerson Gholson, born March 13, 1834
6. Phoebe Jane Gholson, born March 6, 1837
7. William Samuel Gholson, born September 29, 1839
8. Susan Frances Gholson, born September 30, 1842
9. Sarah Gholson, born February 22, 1844
10. Marguerite L. J. Gholson, born August 25, 1848
11. Daniel Jarrell Gholson, born January 10, 1851 (Twin child)
12. Margaret Burdine Gholson, born January 10, 1851 (Twin child)
13. Martha Gholson, born February 1852

== Correspondence ==
R. D. Gholson, Governor of Washington Territory to J. Black, Secry of State, 14 February 1861

Woodville, Ky, Feb. 14, 1861

Hon. J. Black State Department Washington City D.C.

Sir,

Unwilling even for a day to hold office under a (so called) "Republican" president, with my cordial thanks to President Buchanan for the honor of his bestowal, I hereby tender my resignation of the office of Governor of Washington Territory, to take effect from and after the 4th day of March next.

My leave of absence expires on the 25th inst. Will you sir do me the kindness to extend it to the 4th proximo so that my term in office will be just two years, I having been appointed March 5, 1859.

With profound respect I have the honor to be your most obedient servant.

R. D. Gholson, Gov. W.T.

== Sources ==
- Charles Gholson, August 19, 2001. "Richard Dickerson Gholson 1802–1861"

From Genealogy Forum at Genealogy.com

- IGI Individual Record #457167

Record from FamilySearch.com

- Wiley A. Jarrell "William J. Gholson (1758–1837);Va>Ky"

From Genealogy Forum at Genealogy.com

- Meany, Edmond S (1915). Governors of Washington : territorial and state. University of Washington. Available online through the Washington State Library's Classics in Washington History collection

== Notes ==
Political offices
Preceded by LaFayette McMullen	Territorial Governor of Washington; 1859–1861	Succeeded by William H. Wallace
