= List of defunct United States congressional committees =

The United States Congress has operated with more than 1,500 standing, special, select, or joint committees over the years.

Most of these committees are now defunct. In some cases, their responsibilities were merged with those of other committees. For others, the committee remained in existence, but its name was changed. However, the bulk of committees were eliminated because they served a single purpose or it was deemed that subject matter no longer merited its own committee.

These lists contain both select and standing committees. When known, the committee's type, years, reason for elimination, and any successor committees are noted. Some committees, such as the myriad "Committee(s) to Investigate," are included in the list alphabetically by the primary subject matter being studied or investigated.

Early select committees were very fluid, serving their established function and then going out of existence. This makes tracking committees difficult, since many committees were known by the date they were created or by a petition or other document that had been referred to them. In a number of instances, the official journal and other congressional publications did not consistently refer to an individual committee by the same title. Though such inconsistencies still appeared during the 20th century, they were less frequent. Therefore, this list does include hundreds of select committees established by Congress during its early years, particularly prior to 1795 and 1816, when a system of permanent standing committees was established in the House of Representatives and the Senate respectively. The majority of these committees were assigned specific legislative bills, but many served merely ceremonial functions.

In the 1st Congress (1789–1791), the House appointed about 220 select committees over the course of two years. By the 3rd Congress (1793–1795), Congress had three permanent standing committees, the House Committee on Elections, the House Committee on Claims, and the Joint Committee on Enrolled Bills, but more than 350 select committees. While the modern committee system is now firmly established in both House and Senate procedure, with the rules of each House establishing a full range of permanent standing committees and assigning jurisdiction of all legislative issues among them, select committees continue to be used to respond to unique and difficult issues as the need arises.

== Defunct House committees ==
Committee	Type	Established	Terminated	Notes
Alleged Abstraction of Books from the Library of the House	Select	February 14, 1861	February 28, 1861	Investigation of rumors that representatives from southern seceding states had stolen books from the House library.
Alleged Abstraction of a Report from the Clerk's Office	Select	March 3, 1863	March 3, 1863	Investigation into the disappearance of a committee report from the Select Committee on Government Contracts
Accountability of Public Moneys	Select	April 12, 1822	May 8, 1822	Select committee expired
Accounts	Standing	December 27, 1803	January 2, 1947	Merged with House Administration
Admission to the Floor	Select	June 18, 1886	January 27, 1887	Select committee expired
Affairs with Algiers	Select	February 9, 1808	April 25, 1808	Select committee expired
Aging (Permanent Select)	Select	October 8, 1974	October 9, 1992	Terminated at the end of the 102nd Congress. Committee not renewed during the 103rd Congress.
Memorial of the Agricultural Bank of Mississippi	Select	January 7, 1842	April 9, 1842	Memorial requesting forgiveness of a debt to the United States.
Air Accidents	Select	March 6, 1941	January 7, 1943	Select committee expired
Air Services	Select	March 24, 1924	1925	Select committee expired
Alabama’s Admission to the Union	Select	December 7, 1818	March 3, 1819	Select committee expired
Alabama Affairs	Select	December 21, 1874	February 23, 1875	Select committee expired
Alcoholic Liquor Traffic	Select	May 16, 1879	August 18, 1893	Became a standing committee
Alcoholic Liquor Traffic	Standing	August 18, 1893	December 5, 1927	[data missing]
Alleged Assault on Senator Sumner	Select	May 23, 1856	June 2, 1856	Select committee expired
Amendment to the Constitution	Select	December 17, 1835	February 28, 1837	Amendment related to the Election of President and Vice President; Select committee expired
Amendment to the Constitution	Select	January 11, 1837	July 9, 1838	Amendment related to the Appointment of Members of Congress to office Select committee expired
American Colonization Society	Select	January 29, 1827	February 7, 1832	Memorial of the American Colonization Society; Select committee expired
American Retail Federation	Special	April 24, 1935	April 7, 1936	Select committee expired
American Ship building	Select	December 19, 1883	February 12, 1887	Select committee expired
American Sugar Refining Company	Special	May 9, 1911	April 20, 1912	[data missing]
Anthracite Emergency Program	Special	September 12, 1940	January 3, 1941	Program to stabilize the Pennsylvania coal industry. Not authorized to hold hearings and no appropriations were authorized for it.
Apportionment of Representatives	Select	November 8, 1811	November 20, 1811	Bring a Bill for the Apportionment of Representatives; Select committee expired
Apportionment of Representatives	Select	December 29, 1820	March 3, 1821	Apportionment of Representatives under the 4th Census; Select committee expired
Apportionment of Representatives	Select	December 11, 1826	March 3, 1827	Apportionment of Representatives under the Next Census; Select committee expired
Apportionment of Representatives	Select	December 13, 1841	January 22, 1842	Apportionment of Representatives under the 6th Census; Select committee expired
Arkansas Affairs	Select	May 27, 1874	February 6, 1875	Select committee expired
Arkansas Territory	Select	December 16, 1818	December 21, 1818	Select committee expired
Arkansas Territorial Limits	Select	January 9, 1823	March 3, 1823	Select committee expired
Arms Contracts	Select	January 7, 1824	March 27, 1824	Select committee expired
Arms Exports	Select	February 27, 1809	February 27, 1809	Select committee expired
Army Appropriations Inquiry	Select	December 10, 1819	February 28, 1820	Select committee expired
Army Pay	Select	December 16, 1844	March 3, 1845	Select committee expired
Army Regulations	Select	December 6, 1805	April 21, 1806	Select committee expired
Army Supply Contracts	Select	February 3, 1814	April 13, 1814	Select committee expired
Assassinations	Select	February 2, 1977	March 29, 1979	Investigation into the Assassinations of President John. F. Kennedy and Dr. Martin Luther King Jr. Select committee expired
Assault on the President’s Secretary	Select	April 18, 1828	May 16, 1828	Select committee expired
Establishing an Assay Office in the Gold Region	Select	January 4, 1831	April 4, 1834	[data missing]
Export Control	Select	1961	1962	Select committee expired
Assent of Congress to an Act of the Virginia Legislature	Select	April 8, 1816	April 9, 1816	Select committee expired
Astronautics and Space Exploration	Select	March 5, 1958	July 21, 1958	Select committee expired
Asylum for the Blind	Select	December 12, 1831	December 28, 1831	Select committee expired
Attorney General's Office	Select	December 4, 1816	March 3, 1817	Select committee expired
Investigate the Incorporation of the Baltic States into the U.S.S.R.	Select	July 27, 1953	March 4, 1954	Replaced by the Committee on Communist Aggression
Bank of the United States	Select	November 30, 1818	January 16, 1819	Conduct and Management of the Bank of the United States; Select committee expired
Bank of the United States	Select	December 13, 1820	March 7, 1822	Petition of the Bank of the United States; Select committee expired
Bank of the United States	Select	March 14, 1832	June 25, 1834	United States Bank Affairs; Select committee expired
Banking and Currency	Standing	March 2, 1865	January 3, 1975	Renamed Banking, Currency, and Housing
Banking, Currency, and Housing	Standing	January 3, 1975	January 4, 1977	Renamed Banking, Finance, and Urban Affairs
Banking, Finance, and Urban Affairs	Standing	January 4, 1977	January 5, 1995	Renamed Banking and Financial Services
Banking and Financial Services	Standing	January 5, 1995	January 3, 2001	Renamed Financial Services
Banking Memorials	Select	January 20, 1823	February 27, 1823	Memorials of Banking Institutions and Insurance Companies in Charleston, South Carolina, and the Bank of the United States; Select committee expired
Bankrupt Law	Select	July 15, 1861	May 17, 1866	Select committee expired
Bankruptcy	Select	January 1, 1812	July 6, 1812	Establishing a Uniform System of Bankruptcy; Select committee expired
Banks of the District of Columbia	Select	February 19, 1814	March 3, 1817	Select committee expired
Banks of the District of Columbia	Select	December 31, 1835	June 20, 1836	Select committee expired
Banks of the District of Columbia	Select	December 4, 1844	February 25, 1845	Select committee expired
Benefits for Dependents of Armed Services Veterans	Select	August 4, 1954	January 15, 1956	Committee to Investigate and Study Certain Benefits for Surviving Dependents of Deceased Members and Former Members of the Armed Forces; Select committee expired
Berkshire Association	Select	January 29, 1817	February 21, 1817	Select committee expired
Bible Society of Philadelphia	Select	February 24, 1816	March 5, 1816	Select committee expired
Biennial Register	Select	April 28, 1832	June 26, 1834	Select committee expired
Bills of Exchange	Select	January 13, 1826	March 22, 1826	Select committee expired
Bills and Resolutions Introduced in the House	Select	February 10, 1909	March 3, 1909	Select committee expired
Bonus of the National Bank	Select	December 16, 1816	December 23, 1816	Select committee expired
Boundary of the Chickasaw Indians	Select	February 6, 1834	May 6, 1834	Committee to review the True Boundary of the Chickasaw Indians, Between the Tennessee and Mississippi Rivers; Select committee expired
Bounty Land Act of 1850	Select	December 5, 1850	August 31, 1852	Select committee expired
Bounty Lands Commutation	Select	December 11, 1816	January 11, 1817	Select committee expired
Boynton Investigation	Select	February 8, 1884	July 7, 1884	Select committee expired
British Depredations of the Northern Frontier	Select	January 25, 1832	March 17, 1832	Select committee expired
Brownstown Treaty	Select	January 26, 1820	May 12, 1820	Select committee expired
Conduct of Peter J. Bruin	Select	April 18, 1808	April 21, 1808	Committee investigated the conduct of Peter J. Bruin, one of the Judges of the Superior Court of the Mississippi Territory
Budget	Select	July 31, 1919	October 11, 1919	Select committee expired
Census	Standing	1901	1946	Jurisdiction merged into Post Office and Civil Service
Children, Youth, and Families	Select	1983	1993	[data missing]
Civil Service	Standing	1924	1946	Jurisdiction merged into Post Office and Civil Service
Claims	Standing	November 13, 1794	1946	Jurisdiction merged into Judiciary
Climate Crisis	Select	2019	January 3, 2023	Terminated
Coinage, Weights and Measures	Standing	1867	1946	Jurisdiction merged into Banking and Currency
Commerce and Manufactures	Standing	December 14, 1795	1819	Renamed and split into Commerce and Manufactures
Commerce	Standing	1819	1893	First period. Renamed Interstate and Foreign Commerce
Conservation of Wildlife Resources	Select	1934	1946	[data missing]
Communist Aggression	Select	1954	1954	[data missing]
Disposition of Executive Papers	Standing	1889	1947	Jurisdiction merged into House Administration
Disposition of Surplus Property	Select	1946	1946	Select committee expired
District of Columbia	Standing	1808	1999	Jurisdiction merged into Government Reform
Economic and Educational Opportunities	Standing	1995	1997	Renamed Committee on Education and the Workforce
Economic Disparity and Fairness in Growth	Select	December 30, 2020	January 3, 2023	Terminated
Education	Standing	1883	1947	Merged into Education and Labor
Education and Labor	Standing	1867	1883	Split into Education and Labor; 1947–1995: Restored as Economic and Educational Opportunities; 1997–2007: Renamed Education and the Workforce; Restored in 2007
Elections	Standing	April 13, 1789	1947	Jurisdiction merged into House Administration
Election of the President, Vice President and Representatives in Congress	Standing	1893	1947	Jurisdiction merged into House Administration
Energy Independence and Global Warming	Select	2007	2011	Terminated
Engraving	Standing	1844	1860	Jurisdiction merged into Printing
Enrolled Bills	Standing	1876	1947	Jurisdiction merged into House Administration
Events Surrounding the 2012 Terrorist Attack in Benghazi	Select	2014	2016	Terminated
Expenditures in the Executive Departments	Standing	1927	1952	Created by the merger of several predecessor expenditure committees Jurisdiction merged into Government Operations
Expenditures in the Agriculture Department	Standing	1889	1927	Jurisdiction merged into Expenditures in the Executive Departments
Expenditures in the Commerce and Labor Departments	Standing	1905	1913	Split between Expenditures in the Commerce Department and Expenditures in the Labor Department
Expenditures in the Commerce Department	Standing	1913	1927	Merged into Expenditures in the Executive Departments
Expenditures in the Interior Department	Standing	1860	1927	Merged into Expenditures in the Executive Departments
Expenditures in the Justice Department	Standing	1874	1927	Merged into Expenditures in the Executive Departments
Expenditures in the Labor Department	Standing	1913	1927	Merged into Expenditures in the Executive Departments
Expenditures in the Navy Department	Standing	1816	1927	Merged into Expenditures in the Executive Departments
Expenditures in the Post Office Department	Standing	1816	1927	Merged into Expenditures in the Executive Departments
Expenditures in the State Department	Standing	1816	1927	Merged into Expenditures in the Executive Departments
Expenditures in the Treasury Department	Standing	1816	1927	Merged into Expenditures in the Executive Departments
Expenditures in the War Department	Standing	1816	1927	Merged into Expenditures in the Executive Departments
Expenditures on Public Buildings	Standing	1816	1927	Merged into Expenditures in the Executive Departments
Flood Control	Standing	February 3, 1916	January 3, 1947	Jurisdiction over related subjects previously under Rivers and Harbors, and some issues included from Levees and Improvements of the Mississippi River before its termination in 1911. Committee terminated by 1946 Reorg., with its successor being Public Works.
Freedmen's Affairs	Standing	1866	1875	Implementation of 14th and 15th Amendments
Government Operations	Standing	1952	1999	Moved into Government Reform
Government Reform	Standing	1999	2007	Renamed Oversight and Government Reform
Government Research	Select	1963	1964	Select committee expired
House Beauty Shop	Select	1967	1979	Moved into House Administration
House Restaurant	Select	1969	1975	[data missing]
Hurricane Katrina	Select	2005	2006	Select committee expired
Immigration and Naturalization	Standing	1893	1946	Moved into Judiciary
Indian Affairs	Standing	1821	1946	Moved into Public Lands
Industrial Arts and Expositions	Standing	1903	1927	[data missing]
Insular Affairs	Standing	1899	1946	Cuban affairs moved to Foreign Affairs in 1906; Moved to Public Lands
Interior and Insular Affairs	Standing	1951	1993	Moved to Resources
Internal Security	Standing	1969	1975	Functions transferred to the Judiciary
International Relations	Standing	1975	1979	Renamed Foreign Affairs; Restored 1995–2007; Reverted to Foreign Affairs
Interstate and Foreign Commerce	Standing	1893	1981	Renamed Energy and Commerce
Inquiry into Operation of the U.S. Air Services	Select	1924	1925	Select committee expired
Invalid Pensions	Standing	January 10, 1831	1946	Terminated
Irrigation and Reclamation	Standing	1924	1946	Moved to Public Lands
Irrigation of Arid Lands	Standing	1893	1924	Renamed Irrigation and Reclamation
January 6th attack	Select	July 1, 2021	January 3, 2023	Official title: Select Committee to Investigate the January 6th Attack on the United States Capitol Terminated
Katyn Forest Massacre Investigation	Select	1951	1952	Select committee expired
Labor	Standing	1883	1947	Merged into Education and Labor
Levees and Improvements of the Mississippi River	Standing	November 7, 1877	April 5, 1911	Committee terminated, with its successor being Rivers and Harbors.
Library	Standing	[data missing]	[data missing]	Some functions moved into House Administration. Now Joint Committee on the Library
Lobbying Activities	Select	1949	1951	Select committee expired
Manufactures	Standing	December 8, 1819	1911	Created from the split of Commerce and Manufactures in 1819, it became inactive during its later years and was eliminated in 1911.
Memorials	Standing	1929	1947	Moved into House Administration
Merchant Marine and Fisheries	Standing	1887	1932	[data missing]
Merchant Marine and Fisheries	Standing	1935	1994	[data missing]
Merchant Marine, Radio and Fisheries	Standing	1932	1935	Temporary renaming of Merchant Marine and Fisheries
Mileage	Standing	1837	1927	Duties returned to Accounts
Military Affairs	Standing	1822	1946	Moved into Armed Services
Military Pensions	Standing	1825	1831	Renamed Invalid Pensions
Militia	Standing	1835	1911	Moved to Military Affairs
Mines and Mining	Standing	1865	1946	Moved to Public Lands
Mississippi Levees	Standing	December 10, 1875	November 7, 1877	Renamed Levees and Improvements of the Mississippi River, until 1911.
Modernization of Congress	Select	January 4, 2019	January 3, 2023	Terminated
Impeachment Trial Investigation	Select	March 1868	1868	Official title: Select Committee to Investigate in Regard to Alleged Improper Influences on the Impeachment Trial Select committee expired
Investigate Commodity Transactions	Select	1947	1948	Select committee expired
Investigate Conditions Interfering with Interstate Commerce between the States of Illinois and Missouri	Select	1917	1921	Select committee expired
Investigate Contracts and Expenditures Made by the War Department during the War	Select	1919	1921	Select committee expired
Investigating Defense Migration	Select	1941	1943	Select committee expired
Investigate the Disposition of Surplus Property	Select	1946	1946	Select committee expired
Investigate the Seizure of Montgomery Ward and Company	Select	1943	1945	Select committee expired
Investigate Foundations and Other Organizations	Select	1952	1953	Select committee expired
Investigate the Use of Chemicals in Food and Cosmetics	Select	1950	1953	Select committee expired
Investigate the National Labor Relations Board	Select	1939	1940	Select committee expired
Investigate the Preparation, Distribution, Sale, Payment, Retirement, Surrender, Cancellation, and Destruction of Government Bonds and Other Securities	Select	1924	1925	Select committee expired
Investigate the Seizure of Montgomery Ward and Company	Select	1944	1944	Select committee expired
Investigate Real Estate Bondholders' Reorganizations	Select	1934	1935	Select committee expired
Investigate Tax-Exempt Foundations and Comparable Organizations	Select	1952	1954	Select committee expired
Lobbying Activities	Select	1949	1951	Select committee expired
Missing Persons in Southeast Asia	Select	1975	1976	Select committee expired
Natural Resources	Standing	1993	1995	Renamed Resources; 2007: Restored
Narcotics Abuse and Control	Select	1976	1993	Select committee expired
Naval Affairs	Standing	1822	1946	Moved into Armed Services
Niagara Ship Canal	Select	1861	1861	Select committee expired
Newsprint and Paper Supply	Select	1947	1948	Select committee expired
Offensive and Undesirable Books, Magazines, and Comic Books	Select	1952	1952	Select committee expired
Pacific Railroads	Standing	1865	1911	Terminated
Patents	Standing	1837	1946	Moved into Judiciary
Pensions and Revolutionary War Claims	Standing	December 22, 1813	December 9, 1825	Renamed Revolutionary Pensions
Pensions	Standing	1880	1946	Terminated
Population	Select	1977	1979	Select committee expired
Post Office and Civil Service	Standing	1946	1999	Moved into Government Reform
Post Office and Post Roads	Standing	1808	1946	Moved into Post Office and Civil Service
Post-War Economic Policy and Planning	Special	1944	1946	[data missing]
Printing	Standing	1846	[data missing]	Moved into House Administration
Private Land Claims	Standing	April 29, 1816	1911	Abolished due to diminished legislative activity.
Professional Sports	Select	1976	1977	Select committee expired
Public Buildings and Grounds	Standing	1837	1946	Established as a standing Committee, replacing the Select Committee on Public Buildings created in 1819. Jurisdiction over "all the public buildings constructed by the United States" was given by an 1871 resolution.
Public Expenditures	Standing	1814	1880	[data missing]
Public Lands	Standing	1805	1951	Renamed Interior and Insular Affairs
Public Works	Standing	1947	1968	Created by the 1946 Reorg., which combined the jurisdictions of Public Buildings and Grounds, Rivers and Harbors, Roads, and Flood Control Committees. Its wide jurisdiction remained the same throughout.
Railways and Canals	Standing	April 9, 1869	1927	Renamed from Roads and Canals. Jurisdiction contracted significantly over time in 1880 responsibility for improvement of navigation of rivers and many railroad related matters moved to Commerce. Dissolved in 1927 with its jurisdiction added to Interstate and Foreign Commerce.
Reconstruction	Select	1867	1871	Select committee expired
Records of Committees Relating to Banking and Currency	[data missing]	[data missing]	[data missing]	[data missing]
Reform in the Civil Service	Standing	1893	1924	Renamed Civil Service
Resources	Standing	1995	2007	Renamed Natural Resources
Revisal and Unfinished Business	Standing	December 9, 1795	1868	Unfinished business duties obsolete, remainder renamed Revision of Laws
Revision of Laws	Standing	1868	1946	Moved into Judiciary
Revolutionary Claims	Standing	1825	1873	Moved to War Claims
Revolutionary Pensions (1825)	Standing	December 9, 1825	December 13, 1825	Split between Military Pensions and Revolutionary Claims
Revolutionary Pensions (1831)	Standing	January 10, 1831	1880	Abolished. Jurisdiction referred to Pensions
Rivers and Harbors	Standing	December 1883	1946	Given jurisdiction over subjects relating to improvements of navigation and responsible for reporting river and harbor bills, previously handled by Commerce. Jurisdiction changed over time, gaining responsibilities of Levees and Improvements of the Mississippi River, when terminated in 1911, then losing that subject to the new Flood Control in 1916. After 1920 it lost ability to report appropriations and was limited to reporting authorizations.
Roads	Standing	1913	1946	The committee was disbanded by the Legislative Reorganization Act of 1946, and its jurisdiction included in those of the new Public Works.
Roads and Canals	Standing	1831	1869	Originated as a select committee in 1815 and reappointed at each succeeding Congress until December 1831, when it became a standing committee in 1869 a motion was approved to change the name to the Railways and Canals
Science	Standing	1995	2007	Renamed Science and Technology
Science and Astronautics	Standing	1959	1974	Renamed Science and Technology
Science and Technology	Standing	1974	1987	Renamed Committee on Science, Space and Technology (Restored in 2007)
Science, Space and Technology	Standing	1987	1995	Renamed Committee on Science
Survivor Benefits	Select	1954	1955	Select committee expired
Territories	Standing	1825	1946	Moved to Public Lands
U.S. Shipping Board Operations	Select	1919	1921	Select committee expired
Un-American Activities	Standing	1945	1969	Also called HUAC or HCUA. Became Internal Security
Uniform System of Coinage, Weights and Measures	Standing	1864	1867	Renamed Committee on Coinage, Weights and Measures
Ventilation and Acoustics	Standing	1893	1911	[data missing]
Voting Irregularities of August 2, 2007	Select	August 3, 2007	January 3, 2009	Select committee expired
War Claims	Standing	1873	1946	Moved into Judiciary
Water Power	Special	1918	1921	[data missing]
Woman Suffrage	Standing	1917	1927	Implementation of the 19th Amendment
World War Veterans' Legislation	Standing	January 18, 1924	1946	Renamed Veterans' Affairs

== Defunct Senate committees ==
Committee	Type	Established	Terminated	Notes
Committee of the Whole	Standing	1789	1986	A parliamentary device used by the Senate to consider issues as a body. Used extensively prior to the creation of standing committees in 1816.
Accounts of James Monroe	Select	February 8, 1831	February 11, 1831	Select committee expired
Additional Accommodations for the Library of Congress	Select	March 3, 1881	April 18, 1921	Select committee expired
Aeronautical and Space Sciences	Standing	July 24, 1958	February 11, 1977	Replaced by Commerce, Science and Transportation
Agriculture	Standing	December 9, 1825	March 3, 1857	Restored in 1863
Agriculture	Standing	March 6, 1863	February 5, 1884	Renamed Agriculture and Forestry
Agriculture and Forestry	Standing	February 5, 1884	February 11, 1977	Renamed Agriculture, Nutrition and Forestry
Agricultural Labor Shortages in the West	Special	October 24, 1942	December 16, 1942	[data missing]
Air Mail and Ocean Mail Contracts	Special	February 24, 1933	June 30, 1936	[data missing]
Alabama Land Purchase	Select	February 4, 1828	May 26, 1828	Official title: Memorial of the State of Alabama to Purchase Certain Public Lands from Within the State; Select committee expired
Alaska Railroad (Special Select)	Special	July 1, 1930	December 4, 1933	[data missing]
Alien Property Custodian's Office	Select	July 3, 1926	March 3, 1927	Select committee expired
Alter and Improve Senate Chamber	Select	May 19, 1860	August 6, 1861	Select committee expired
Amending the Constitution on the Election of the President and Vice President	Select	March 15, 1830	March 3, 1831	Select committee expired
Amendments to the Constitution	Select	November 23, 1820	March 3, 1825	Official title: Proposed Amendments to the Constitution; Select committee expired
Amendments to the Constitution	Select	June 2, 1834	June 30, 1834	Official title: Resolution to Amend the Constitution; Select committee expired
Amendments to the Constitution	Select	February 27, 1861	February 28, 1861	Official title: Certain Amendments Proposed to the Constitution by the Convention held in Washington City; Select committee expired
American Colonization Society	Select	February 29, 1820	May 15, 1820	[data missing]
Aquatic Life	Special	January 3, 1938	January 3, 1940	Official title: Conservation and Utilization of Aquatic Life
Armed Strikebreakers	Select	August 2, 1892	February 10, 1893	Official title: Investigate Armed Bodies of Men for Private Purposes; Pinkerton Detective Force; Select committee expired
Assault on Charles Sumner	Select	May 23, 1856	May 28, 1856	[data missing]
Atomic Energy	Select	October 22, 1945	August 1, 1946	Replaced by the Joint Committee on Atomic Energy
Atmospheric Telegraph Between Washington and Baltimore	Select	February 23, 1854	August 7, 1854	Proposal for a Pneumatic tube delivery system Select committee expired
Attorney General Harry M. Daugherty	Select	March 3, 1924	March 4, 1925	Select committee expired
Attorney General's Office	Select	December 10, 1816	March 3, 1817	Official title: Establishing an Additional Executive Office of the Attorney General
Audit and Control the Contingent Expenses of the Senate	Standing	November 4, 1807	January 2, 1947	Replaced by Rules and Administration. No mention of committee in 1809.
Bank Note Circulation	Select	February 27, 1840	July 21, 1840	Official title: Committee on the expediency of an amendment to the Constitution in Relation to the Circulation of Bank Notes and other Paper Currency; Select committee expired
Banking and Currency	Standing	May 22, 1913	October 26, 1970	Renamed Banking, Housing, and Urban Affairs
Bankruptcy	Select	December 8, 1826	March 3, 1827	Official title: Establishing a Uniform System of Bankruptcy; Select committee expired
Bankruptcy	Select	June 8, 1840	July 21, 1840	Official title: Bills to Establish a Uniform System of Bankruptcy throughout the United States; Select committee expired
Bankruptcy and Receivership	Special	June 13, 1933	May 29, 1936	Official title: Special Committee to Investigate Receivership and Bankruptcy Proceedings in the Courts of the United States
Banks Expedition	Select	December 22, 1862	February 9, 1863	Official title: Inquire and Report in Regard to the Chartering of Transport Vessels for the Banks Expedition; Select committee expired
Banks in Which Deposits Have Been Made	Select	December 24, 1824	March 3, 1825	Official title: Liquidation of the Balances Due from Banks in Which Deposits Have Been Made
Banks of the District of Columbia	Select	December 17, 1857	June 14, 1858	Select committee expired
Bribery Attempts Investigation	Special	May 17, 1894	August 2, 1894	Official title: to Investigate Attempts at Bribery During the Consideration of the Tariff Bill
Budget	Special	July 14, 1919	April 13, 1920	See Committee on the Budget
Cabinet Officers on the Floor of the Senate	Select	December 7, 1880	August 8, 1882	Select committee expired
California's Admission to the Union	Select	January 24, 1849	March 3, 1850	Stubbs Lists the committee through September 30, 1850, but there is no record of it existing during the 31st Congress. See the Committee of Thirteen for the Settlement of the Slavery Question
Campaign Expenditures	Special	June 17, 1924	February 12, 1925	[data missing]
Campaign Expenditures	Select	December 5, 1932	December 21, 1933	Investigate Campaign Expenditures of Presidential and Vice-Presidential Candidates and Candidates for the United States Senate.
Campaign Expenditures Investigation	Special	January 3, 1935	January 3, 1941	
Campaign Expenditures, 1944	Special	March 30, 1944	March 15, 1945	Official title: Presidential, Vice-Presidential, and Senate Campaign Expenditures in 1944
Campaign Expenditures, 1946	Special	January 14, 1946	[data missing]	
Canadian Relations	Select	July 31, 1888	January 13, 1892	Became a standing committee
Canadian Relations	Select	January 13, 1892	April 18, 1921	Merged with Foreign Relations
Catlin's Collection of Indian Scenes, Purchase of	Select	February 3, 1852	June 23, 1852	[data missing]
Censure Charges against Senator McCarthy	Select	August 2, 1954	December 2, 1954	Terminated on passage of a motion to censure Senator Joseph McCarthy
Census	Standing	December 12, 1887	April 18, 1921	Preceded by various select committees
Seventh Census	Select	December 14, 1848	June 28, 1852	Select committee expired
Ninth Census	Select	January 29, 1869	March 3, 1869	Select committee expired
Tenth Census	Select	April 4, 1878	March 3, 1887	Replaced by the Committee on the Census
Centennial of the Constitution and the Discovery of America	Select	July 31, 1888	March 3, 1889	Replaced with the Select Committee on the Quadro-Centennial
Centralization of Heavy Industry in the United States	Special	December 21, 1943	December 19, 1944	[data missing]
Charges Against Benjamin Stark	Select	March 18, 1862	April 22, 1862	Select committee expired
Charges Against Burton K. Wheeler	Select	April 9, 1924	May 19, 1924	Investigation into Senator Burton Wheeler for acting as an attorney in cases to which the U.S. was a party.; Select committee expired
Charges Against Senator Powell Clayton	Select	January 9, 1872	February 26, 1873	Select committee expired
Senator Pomeroy	Select	February 10, 1873	March 3, 1873	Charges of election bribes against Senator Samuel C. Pomeroy; Select committee expired
Charges of Corruption Contained in the Daily Times	Select	March 12, 1846	March 16, 1846	Charges of corruption against the Senate related to the U.S.-British Oregon boundary dispute that were printed by the Daily Times in Washington, D.C., on 5th, 9th, 10th, 11th, 1846.; Select committee expired
Cherokee Nation's Complaints of Invasion of their Territory	Select	August 5, 1892	March 3, 1893	Select committee expired
Circulation of Bank Notes in the District of Columbia	Select	January 9, 1860	January 17, 1860	Official title: Bill to Prohibit the Issue and Circulation of Bank Notes in the District of Columbia; Select committee expired
Civil Service	Standing	April 18, 1921	January 2, 1947	Replaced by Post Office and Civil Service
Civil Service and Retrenchment	Standing	December 4, 1873	April 18, 1921	Renamed Civil Service
Civil Service Commission Examining Division	Select	January 19, 1922	July 25, 1922	Official title: Investigate the Examining Division of the Civil Service Commission
Civil Service Laws	Special	April 1, 1938	January 25, 1945	Official title: Special Committee to Investigate Administration and Operation of Civil Service Laws and the Classification Act of 1923
Civil Service Operations	Select	March 13, 1888	March 3, 1889	Select committee expired
Civil Service System	Special	April 1, 1938	January 3, 1941	[data missing]
Claims	Standing	December 10, 1816	January 2, 1947	Jurisdiction transferred to Judiciary and United States Court of Federal Claims
Clerical Assistance to Senators	Select	January 26, 1917	March 3, 1917	Select committee expired
Coast and Insular Survey	Standing	December 15, 1899	April 18, 1921	[data missing]
Coast Defenses	Standing	March 13, 1885	April 18, 1921	[data missing]
Coins	Select	December 10, 1929	December 15, 1930	Select committee expired
Coins, Weights and Measures	Select	May 18, 1866	July 16, 1866	Select committee expired
Commerce	Standing	December 12, 1825	January 2, 1947	Transferred to Interstate and Foreign Commerce; Restored in 1961
Commerce	Standing	April 13, 1961	February 11, 1977	Replaced by Commerce, Science and Transportation
Commerce and Manufactures	Standing	December 10, 1816	December 12, 1825	Split into Commerce and Manufactures
Compensation	Select	June 26, 1866	July 2, 1866	Select committee expired
Compensation of Congress	Select	December 11, 1816	March 3, 1817	Official title: Resolution to Amend the Constitution on Compensation of Congress; Select committee expired
United States Senate Select Committee on Compensation of Members of Congress	Select	December 9, 1816	February 6, 1817	Official title: Repealing or Modifying a Law on Compensation of Members of Congress; Select committee expired
Compensation of Senate Employees	Select	March 30, 1885	December 7, 1885	Select committee expired
Compensation of Senate Employees	Select	January 6, 1954	[data missing]	Date as listed in the Congressional Directory, 83rd Congress, 2nd Session.
Comptroller William Medill	Select	June 1, 1860	June 12, 1860	Official title: Select Committee in Relation to the First Comptroller, William Medill; Select committee expired
Conservation of National Resources	Standing	March 22, 1909	April 18, 1921	[data missing]
Confiscation of Rebel Property	Select	May 6, 1862	May 14, 1862	Official title: Committee on S. 151 to Confiscate Property and Free the Slaves of Rebels. Considered various bills related to confiscation of property.; Select committee expired
Constitution of the State of Alabama	Select	December 6, 1819	May 15, 1820	[data missing]
Constitution of the State of Arkansas	Select	March 14, 1835	July 4, 1836	[data missing]
Contribution Investigation	Select	February 7, 1956	March 29, 1956	Investigation into use of political contributions to influence the vote of a senator on a particular bill.; Select committee expired
Corporations Organized in the District of Columbia	Select	July 27, 1892	March 19, 1896	Became a standing committee
Corporations Organized in the District of Columbia	Select	March 19, 1896	April 18, 1921	[data missing]
Counting the Electoral Vote	Select	December 18, 1876	March 3, 1877	United States presidential election of 1876; Select committee expired
Court Reorganization and Judicial Procedure	Special	August 6, 1937	August 5, 1939	[data missing]
Credentials of the Honorable John M. Niles	Select	April 30, 1844	May 16, 1844	Select committee expired
Crop Insurance	Select	September 9, 1922	March 3, 1923	Select committee expired
Cuban Relations	Standing	December 15, 1899	April 18, 1921	Merged with Foreign Relations
Danger of Steam Vessels	Select	December 6, 1837	July 9, 1838	Select committee expired
Debt Imprisonment Abolition	Select	January 21, 1823	March 3, 1829	Official title: Abolishing Imprisonment for Debt; Select committee expired
Debts of the States	Select	January 8, 1840	July 21, 1840	Official title: Assumption by the General Government of the Debts of the States
Depreciation of Foreign Currencies	Select	April 12, 1932	March 3, 1933	Official title: Investigation of Depreciation of Foreign Currencies; Select committee expired
Disorder in the Senate of April 17, 1850	Select	April 17, 1850	September 30, 1850	Fight between Senator Foote and Senator Benton Congressional
Disarmament	Select	[data missing]	[data missing]	Select committee expired
Disposition of Useless Papers in the Executive Departments	Standing	March 22, 1909	April 18, 1921	Byrd first lists it in December 1903. Preceded by the Examination and Disposition of Documents
Distilled Spirit Tax Bill	Select	May 4, 1882	August 8, 1882	Select committee expired
Distributing Public Revenue Among the States	Select	December 14, 1826	March 3, 1913	Select committee expired
District of Columbia	Standing	December 18, 1816	February 11, 1977	Functions transferred to Governmental Affairs
District of Columbia Public School System	Select	February 24, 1920	May 26, 1920	Official title: Investigate the Public School System of the District of Columbia; Select committee expired
District of Columbia Excise Board	Select	January 26, 1915	March 4, 1915	Select committee expired
Dueling	Select	February 25, 1831	March 3, 1831	Select committee expired
Duties on Imports	Select	January 23, 1861	February 1, 1861	Official title: Bill (H.R. 338) to Provide for the Payment of Outstanding Treasury Notes, to Authorize and Loan, and t o Regulate and Fix the Duties on Imports; Select committee expired
Education	Standing	January 28, 1869	February 14, 1870	Renamed Education and Labor
Education and Labor	Standing	February 14, 1870	January 2, 1947	Functions transferred to Labor and Public Welfare
Education and Labor Subcommittee Investigating Violations of Free Speech and the Rights of Labor	Standing	1936	1941	Also known as the La Follette Civil Liberties Committee or La Follette Committee
Education and Labor Subcommittee on Wartime Health and Education	Standing	1943	1946	
Efficiency of the Army Efficiency	Select	July 6, 1861	August 6, 1861	Review of a bill numbered S. 4 to promote efficiency of the Army; Select committee expired
Elections of 1878	Select	December 17, 1878	March 3, 1881	Official title: Inquire into Alleged Frauds and Violence in the Elections of 1878; Select committee expired
Election of William Lorimer	Select	June 7, 1911	May 20, 1912	[data missing]
Eligibility of James Shields	Special	March 6, 1849	March 15, 1849	Official title: Eligibility of the Honorable James Shields to a Seat in the Senate; Select committee expired
Emigrant Route and Telegraphic Line to California	Select	January 20, 1853	March 3, 1853	Official title: Protection of the Emigrant Route and a Telegraphic Line from Missouri to California and Oregon; Select committee expired
Emigration of Negroes from the South to North	Select	December 19, 1879	June 1, 1880	Official title: Investigate the Causes Which Have Led to the Emigration of Negroes from the Southern to the Northern States
Employment of a Fiscal Agent	Select	June 3, 1941	July 21, 1941	[data missing]
Engrossed Bills	Standing	March 9, 1875	April 18, 1921	[data missing]
Enrolled Bills	Standing	March 9, 1875	January 2, 1947	Preceded by the Enrolled Bills (Joint); Transferred to Rules and Administration
Epidemic Diseases	Select	December 4, 1878	December 12, 1887	Became a standing committee
Epidemic Diseases	Select	December 12, 1887	March 19, 1896	Preceded by a select committee Renamed Public Health and National Quarantine
Equal Educational Opportunity	Select	February 19, 1970	January 6, 1973	Select committee expired
Establish a University of the United States	Select	June 2, 1890	March 19, 1896	Became a standing committee
Establish a University of the United States	Select	March 19, 1896	April 18, 1921	[data missing]
Establishing Branches of the Mint	Select	February 5, 1835	February 10, 1835	Select committee expired
Ether Discovery	Select	January 5, 1853	February 19, 1853	Select committee expired
Examination and Disposition of Documents	Select	June 15, 1906	March 22, 1909	Replaced by the Disposition of Useless Papers in the Executive Departments
Examine the Several Branches in Civil Service	Select	December 8, 1875	January 21, 1884	Became a standing committee
Examine the Several Branches in Civil Service	Select	January 21, 1884	April 21, 1921	Preceded by a select committee
Execution without Trial in France	Special	November 4, 1921	March 1, 1923	Investigating the conduct of officers of the Army related to punishment of enlisted men during World War I
Executive Agencies of the Government	Select	February 24, 1936	January 16, 1938	Official title: Investigation of Executive Agencies of the Government. Reported the Reorganization Act of 1939.
Executive Departments Methods	Select	March 3, 1887	March 28, 1889	Official title: Methods of Business of the Executive Departments Methods; Select committee expired
Executive Patronage	Select	January 7, 1835	February 9, 1835	Select committee expired
Expedition of John C. Fremont	Select	June 26, 1848	August 9, 1848	Select Committee on Publication of the Results of the Exploring Expedition of John C. Fremont; Select committee expired
Expenditures in the Department of Agriculture	Select	December 17, 1907	March 22, 1909	Became a standing committee
Expenditures in the Department of Agriculture	Select	March 22, 1909	April 18, 1921	Merged with Expenditures in Executive Departments
Expenditures in the Department of Commerce	Standing	June 24, 1914	April 18, 1921	Formed from Expenditures in the Department of Commerce and Labor; Merged with Expenditures in Executive Departments
Expenditures in the Department of Commerce and Labor	Standing	April 5, 1912	June 24, 1914	Split into Expenditures in the Department of Commerce and Expenditures in the Department of Labor
Expenditures in Executive Departments	Standing	December 15, 1899	December 17, 1907	Official title: Organization, Conduct, and Expenditures of the Executive Departments; Replaced by Select Committee on Expenditures in the State Department on July 1, 1908
Expenditures in Executive Departments	Standing	April 18, 1921	March 3, 1952	Preceded by several individual select committees Renamed Government Operations
Expenditures in the Interior Department	Select	December 17, 1907	March 22, 1909	Became a standing committee
Expenditures in the Interior Department	Select	March 22, 1909	April 18, 1921	Merged with Expenditures in Executive Departments
Expenditures in the Department of Justice	Select	December 17, 1907	March 22, 1909	Became a standing committee
Expenditures in the Department of Justice	Select	March 22, 1909	April 18, 1921	Merged with Expenditures in Executive Departments
Expenditures in the Department of Labor	Standing	June 24, 1914	April 18, 1921	Formed from Expenditures in the Department of Commerce and Labor; Merged with Expenditures in Executive Departments
Expenditures in the Navy Department	Select	December 17, 1907	March 22, 1909	Became a standing committee
Expenditures in the Navy Department	Select	March 22, 1909	April 18, 1921	Merged with Expenditures in Executive Departments
Expenditures in the Post Office Department	Standing	December 22, 1909	April 21, 1921	Merged with Expenditures in Executive Departments
Expenditures of Public Money	Standing	January 21, 1884	1889	[data missing]
Expenditures in the Department of State	Select	December 17, 1907	March 22, 1909	Preceded by Organization, Conduct, and Expenditures of the Executive Departments; Became a standing committee
Expenditures in the Department of State	Select	March 22, 1909	April 18, 1921	Merged with Expenditures in Executive Departments
Expenditures in the Treasury Department	Select	December 17, 1907	December 22, 1909	Became a standing committee
Expenditures in the Treasury Department	Select	December 22, 1909	April 18, 1921	Merged with Expenditures in Executive Departments
Expenditures in the War Department	Select	December 17, 1907	December 22, 1909	Became a standing committee
Expenditures in the War Department	Select	December 22, 1909	April 18, 1921	Merged with Expenditures in Executive Departments
Ex-servicemen Bureaus and Agencies	Select	June 9, 1921	February 17, 1923	Official title: Investigate Bureaus and Agencies Dealing with the Welfare of Ex-servicemen
Evidence Affecting Certain members of the Senate	Select	February 4, 1873	February 27, 1873	Select committee expired
Failed National Banks	Select	June 2, 1892	March 15, 1893	Renamed Select Committee on National Banks
Fire Engines, Purchase of	Select	December 13, 1820	March 3, 1821	Select committee expired
Fiscal Affairs of the Government	Special	February 13, 1941	December 16, 1942	[data missing]
Fiscal Corporation of the United States	Select	August 24, 1841	February 21, 1842	Select committee expired
Fisheries	Standing	January 11, 1884	April 18, 1921	[data missing]
Fishing Bounties and Allowances	Select	March 30, 1840	April 10, 1840	Official title: Character and Origin of Fishing Bounties and Allowances; Select committee expired
Five Civilized Tribes of Indians	Select	December 21, 1887	March 22, 1909	Became a standing committee
Five Civilized Tribes of Indians	Select	March 22, 1909	April 18, 1921	[data missing]
Florida and Its Admission to the Union	Select	February 12, 1840	July 1, 1840	Official title: Division of Florida and Its Admission to the Union
Ford Theater Disaster	Select	December 14, 1893	August 28, 1894	Merged with the Joint Committee on the Ford's Theater Disaster
Foreign Aid Program	Special	July 11, 1956	August 30, 1957	Official title: to Study the Foreign Aid Program
Select Committee on Forest Reservations	Select	March 15, 1893	March 19, 1896	Replaced by Forest Reservations and the Protection of Game
Select Committee on Forest Reservations in California	Select	July 28, 1892	March 15, 1893	Replaced by Select Committee on Forest Reservations
Forest Reservations and the Protection of Game	Standing	March 19, 1896	April 18, 1921	Combined with Committee on Agriculture and Forestry
Freedman's Savings and Trust Company	Select	April 7, 1879	April 2, 1880	Select committee expired
French Spoliations	Select	December 20, 1826	March 3, 1835	Select committee expired
French Spoliations	Select	December 18, 1845	March 3, 1847	French Spoliations prior to 1800
French Spoliations	Select	January 9, 1850	August 7, 1854	French Spoliations prior to 1801
French Spoliations	Select	January 5, 1858	June 11, 1860	French Spoliation claims
Fuel Situation in the Middle West	Special	December 15, 1942	October 5, 1943	[data missing]
Fuels in the Areas West of the Mississippi	Special	December 15, 1942	August 2, 1946	[data missing]
Gasoline and Fuel Oil Shortages	Special	August 28, 1941	December 19, 1944	[data missing]
Geological Survey	Select	July 28, 1892	December 15, 1899	Official title: Select Committee to Investigate the Operations of the Geological Survey; Became a standing committee
Geological Survey	Select	December 15, 1899	April 18, 1921	Select Committee until December 15, 1899
Georgia and the Creek Indians	Select	February 5, 1827	March 3, 1827	Select committee expired
Government Operations	Standing	March 3, 1952	February 11, 1977	Preceded by Expenditures in Executive Departments; Replaced by Governmental Affairs
Government Organization	Select	January 29, 1937	January 3, 1941	See also Government Organization; Select committee expired
Government Printing Office	Select	January 30, 1888	August 23, 1888	Select committee expired
Governmental Affairs	Standing	February 11, 1977	February 17, 2005	Renamed United States Senate Committee on Homeland Security and Governmental Affairs
United States Senate Committee on Haiti and Santo Domingo	Standing	July 27, 1921	June 26, 1922	[data missing]
Harpers Ferry Invasion	Select	December 15, 1859	June 15, 1860	Official title: Inquire into the Facts of the Recent Invasion and Seizure of the United States Armory at Harpers Ferry; Select committee expired
Harpers Ferry Invasion	Select	July 25, 1861	April 18, 1862	[data missing]
Senator Heflin's Letter on Intermarriages in New York	Select	February 7, 1930	March 3, 1931	Official title: Investigate a Certain Letter Written by Senator J. Thomas Heflin on Intermarriages in New York. Racially-tinged letter written to journalist Sam H. Reading on October 15, 1929.
Hot Springs (Arkansas) Commission	Special	December 3, 1878	February 19, 1879	Official title: Cause of the Omission of the Clause Relating to the Hot Springs of Arkansas in the Sundry Civil Appropriation Bill
Human Resources	Standing	February 11, 1977	March 7, 1979	Preceded by Labor and Public Welfare; Renamed Labor and Human Resources
Illegal Appointments in Civil Service	Select	May 19, 1928	March 3, 1929	Select committee expired
Immigration	Standing	December 12, 1889	January 2, 1947	Transferred to Judiciary
Immigration and Naturalization	Select	December 20, 1889	August 18, 1893	Became a standing committee
Immigration and Naturalization	Select	August 18, 1893	January 2, 1947	Subcommittee on Immigration and Naturalization
Impeachment of President Andrew Johnson	Select	February 25, 1868	February 26, 1868	Official title: Consider and Report on the Message of the House Respecting the Impeachment of the President; Select committee expired
Impeachment Trial Investigation	Select	May 27, 1868	November 10, 1868	Official title: Select Committee to Investigate in Regard to Alleged Improper Influences on the Impeachment Trial; Select committee expired
Impeachment of Robert H. Archbald	Select	July 15, 1912	January 13, 1913	Terminated upon conclusion of the impeachment trial Select committee expired
Impeachment of Harry E. Claiborne	Select	August 14, 1986	October 1, 1986	Known as the Impeachment Trial Committee; Select committee expired
Impeachment of Alcee L. Hastings	Select	May 10, 1989	October 20, 1989	Known as the Impeachment Trial Committee; Select committee expired
Impeachment of West H. Humphreys	Select	May 8, 1862	May 9, 1862	Official title: Message of the House of Representatives in Relation to the Impeachment of West H. Humphreys; Select committee expired
Impeachment of Samuel B. Kent	Select	June 24, 2009	July 22, 2009	Known as the Impeachment Trial Committee; Select committee expired
Impeachment of G. Thomas Porteous, Jr.	Select	March 17, 2010	December 8, 2010	Known as the Impeachment Trial Committee; Select committee expired
Impeachment of Walter L. Nixon	Select	May 11, 1989	November 3, 1989	Known as the Impeachment Trial Committee; Select committee expired
Impeachment of James H. Peck	Select	April 26, 1830	April 27, 1830	Select committee expired
Impeachment of Charles Swayne	Select	December 14, 1904	March 3, 1905	Select committee expired
Incendiary Publications	Select	December 26, 1835	February 4, 1836	[data missing]
Indian Affairs	Standing	January 3, 1820	January 2, 1947	Transferred to Committee on Public Lands
Indian Affairs	Standing	February 11, 1977	February 24, 1993	Restored as a select committee Became a standing committee
Indian Contracts Investigation	Select	June 25, 1910	March 3, 1911	Indian Contracts Investigation; Select committee expired
Indian Depredations	Standing	1889	April 18, 1921	Superseded by a select committee
Irrigation and Reclamation	Standing	February 14, 1889	December 16, 1891	Official title: Select Committee on Irrigation and Reclamation of Arid Lands; Became a standing committee
Irrigation and Reclamation	Standing	April 5, 1893	April 18, 1921	Preceded by a select committee
Indian Territory	Select	February 12, 1879	May 31, 1880	Removal of Northern Cheyennes to Indian Territory; Official title: Select Committee to Examine into the Circumstances Connected with the Removal of the Northern Cheyennes from the Sioux Reservation to the Indian Territory; Select committee expired
Indian Territory	Select	June 30, 1906	March 3, 1907	Official title: Select Committee on the Affairs of Five Civilized Tribes in Indian Territory
Indian Title to Certain Lands	Select	March 4, 1818	March 20, 1818	Official title: Select Committee on the Extinguishment of Indian Title to Certain Lands; Select committee expired
Indian Traders	Select	June 3, 1886	March 2, 1889	Select committee expired
Indiana Admission to the Union	Select	December 2, 1816	December 16, 1816	Select committee expired
Industrial Expositions	Standing	December 15, 1899	April 18, 1921	Select Committee 1899–1909 preceded by Select Committee on International Expositions
Intelligence Activities	Select	July 27, 1975	May 19, 1976	Church Committee; Replaced by Select Committee on Intelligence
Interior and Insular Affairs	Standing	1948	1977	Renamed Energy and Natural Resources
Interior Department Clerical Force	Select	August 24, 1865	May 25, 1866	Official title: Bill S. 282 to Reorganize the Clerical Force in the Department of Interior; Select committee expired
Internal Revenue Bureau	Select	March 12, 1924	February 6, 1926	Replaced by Joint Committee on Internal Revenue Taxation
Subcommittee on Internal Security	Standing	December 21, 1950	1977	Also known as the Senate Internal Security Subcommittee (SISS) or the McCarran Committee after Senator Pat McCarran of Nevada
International Copyright Law	Select	January 22, 1846	August 10, 1846	[data missing]
International Expositions	Select	December 30, 1895	December 15, 1899	Renamed Select Committee on Industrial Expositions; Preceded by Select Committee on the Quadro-Centennial
Interoceanic Canals	Standing	December 15, 1899	January 2, 1947	Transferred to Interstate and Foreign Commerce
Interstate and Foreign Commerce	Standing	January 2, 1947	April 13, 1961	Renamed Commerce
Interstate Commerce	Select	March 17, 1885	January 18, 1886	Became a standing committee
Interstate Commerce	Select	December 12, 1887	January 2, 1947	Renamed Interstate and Foreign Commerce
United States Senate Special Committee to Investigate the National Defense Program	Special	March 1, 1941	April 28, 1948	Truman Committee
Investigation and Retrenchment	Standing	December 14, 1871	March 3, 1873	[data missing]
Irrigation and Reclamation	Standing	February 14, 1889	December 16, 1891	Official title: Select Committee on Irrigation and Reclamation of Arid Lands; Became a standing committee
Irrigation and Reclamation	Standing	December 16, 1891	January 2, 1947	[data missing]
Labor and Human Resources	Standing	March 7, 1979	January 19, 1999	Renamed Health, Education, Labor, and Pensions
Labor and Public Welfare	Standing	January 2, 1947	February 11, 1977	Renamed Human Resources
Labor-Management Relations	Select	January 30, 1957	March 31, 1960	Official title: Improper Activities in Labor and Management; Select committee expired
Land and Water Policies of the United States	Special	January 25, 1935	June 20, 1936	Official title: Special Committee on the Survey of Land and Water Policies of the United States
Land Commissioners Reports	Select	February 6, 1820	March 3, 1821	Official title: Select Committee on the Reports for Land Commissioners
Law Enforcement Undercover Activities of the Justice Department	Select	March 24, 1982	December 15, 1982	[data missing]
Library	Standing	February 25, 1806	January 2, 1947	Joint Committee from 1806 to 1844 and from 1861 to 1882; Senate Committee from 1883 to 1947 replaced by Joint Committee on the Library
Lobbying Activities	Select	July 11, 1935	June 16, 1938	Select committee expired
Loss of Original Papers of Mark and Richard Bean	Select	January 23, 1854	August 7, 1854	Select committee expired
Late Presidential Election Louisiana	Standing	June 5, 1878	March 1, 1879	United States presidential election of 1876
Mail Cover on Senators	Special	December 1, 1954	December 3, 1954	Investigating whether mail from Joseph McCarthy was intercepted or reviewed by anyone to determine either the contents or the identify of correspondents.
Contested Election of 1850	Standing	December 1, 1851	August 21, 1852	Contested election of Stephen R. Mallory by David L. Yulee
Manufactures	Standing	February 10, 1825	March 3, 1855	[data missing]
Manufactures	Standing	February 10, 1864	January 2, 1947	Restored in 1864
Marquis de La Fayette	Select	January 21, 1824	May 27, 1824	Official title: Resolution Respecting the Marquis de La Fayette visit by the Marquis to the United States.; Select committee expired
Memorial of A. B. Quinby	Select	January 26, 1837	February 1, 1837	Official title: Memorial of A. B. Quinby for his Steam Engine Safety Valve; Select committee expired
American Association for the Promotion of Science	Select	April 24, 1854	August 7, 1854	Official title: Select Committee on Professor Mitchell's machine for measuring right ascensions and declination Select committee expired
Memorial of the Bank of the United States	Select	January 9, 1832	March 13, 1832	Select committee expired
Memorial of Certain Cherokee Claimants	Select	May 30, 1848	August 14, 1848	Select committee expired
Memorial of the Citizens of Georgetown (DC) for the Retrocession of that Part of the District	Select	April 10, 1838	July 3, 1838	Select committee expired
Memorial of Davis Hatch	Select	June 8, 1870	June 25, 1870	[data missing]
Memorial of Duff Green	Select	December 14, 1837	July 9, 1838	Select committee expired
Memorial of Edward D. Tippett	Select	February 24, 1838	July 9, 1838	Select committee expired
Memorial of Houmas Lands Settlers	Select	January 4, 1860	March 23, 1860	Official title: Memorial of Certain Settlers of the Houmas Lands; Select committee expired
Memorials of the Manufacturers Iron	Select	January 27, 1831	March 3, 1831	Select committee expired
Memorial of the Legislature of Arkansas	Select	December 17, 1823	March 23, 1824	Select committee expired
Memorial on Services Rendered by Carlisle P. Patterson	Standing	January 11, 1882	August 8, 1882	[data missing]
Memorial of W.T.G. Morton	Select	December 26, 1846	March 3, 1847	Select committee expired
Memphis Convention	Select	February 3, 1846	June 26, 1846	Select committee expired
Mexican Boundary	Select	August 17, 1852	March 3, 1853	Official title: Investigate Irregularities in Running and Marking the Mexican Boundary; Select committee expired
Mexican Boundary Commission	Select	July 8, 1850	September 30, 1850	Official title: Appointment of a Scientific Corps Attached to the Mexican Boundary Commission; Select committee expired
Mexican Boundary Commission	Select	July 26, 1852	August 31, 1852	Official title: Report to the Secretary of Interior Mexican Boundary Commission
Mexican Propaganda	Select	December 9, 1927	January 9, 1929	Investigation whether senators received any bribes from foreign governments to influence official actions.; Select committee expired
Mexican Relations	Select	December 11, 1877	June 20, 1878	Select committee expired
Mexican Claims Commission	Select	February 25, 1852	March 28, 1854	Official title: Proceedings of the Board of Commissioners on Claims Against Mexico; Select committee expired
Michigan and Arkansas Admission to the Union	Select	January 27, 1834	May 3, 1834	[data missing]
Mileage of Members of Congress	Select	January 6, 1830	July 7, 1840	Official title: Establish a Uniform Rule for Computation of Mileage of Members of Congress; Select committee expired
Military Affairs	Standing	December 10, 1816	January 2, 1947	Merged with Armed Services
Military Asylum near Washington, D.C.	Select	April 12, 1858	August 18, 1858	Select committee expired
Military Claims Originating in West Virginia	Select	February 5, 1863	February 13, 1863	Official title: Appointment of a Commission to Examine and Decide upon Military Claims Originating in the State of Virginia, West of the Blue Ridge; Select committee expired
Militia	Standing	December 10, 1816	December 16, 1857	Merged with Military Affairs
Mines and Mining	Standing	March 8, 1865	January 2, 1947	Other sources list date established as December 5, 1865.
Mississippi's Admission to the Union	Select	December 1, 1817	December 3, 1817	Select committee expired
Mississippi Flood Control Project	Select	February 22, 1933	January 5, 1937	Official title: Labor Conditions on the Mississippi Flood Control Project; Select committee expired
Mississippi River and Its Tributaries	Standing	March 19, 1879	April 18, 1921	[data missing]
Mississippi River Levees Reconstruction	Select	June 8, 1866	July 2, 1866	Select committee expired
Mississippi River Levee System	Select	June 3, 1870	March 3, 1879	Replaced by Mississippi River and Its Tributaries; Select committee expired
Memorial of the Mississippi Territory	Select	January 7, 1817	January 17, 1817	Select committee expired
Merchant Marine	Special	February 25, 1938	August 5, 1939	Official title: Investigate Conditions in the Merchant Marine
Mississippi Election Frauds, 1876	Select	March 31, 1876	August 7, 1876	[data missing]
Missouri's Admission to the Union	Select	November 14, 1820	December 13, 1820	Select committee expired
Monuments to Deceased Senators	Select	January 20, 1848	August 14, 1848	Select committee expired
Munitions Industry	Select	April 12, 1934	June 11, 1938	Also known as the Nye Committee; Official name: Special Committee on Investigation of the Munitions Industry (See Merchants of Death at Senate.gov)
National Armory and Foundry	Select	March 21, 1862	July 17, 1862	[data missing]
National Banks	Select	May 24, 1866	July 28, 1866	Restored in 1892 as Failed National Banks
National Banks	Select	March 15, 1893	March 22, 1909	Renamed from Failed National Banks; Became a standing committee
National Banks	Select	March 22, 1909	April 18, 1921	[data missing]
National Fuels Study	Special	September 11, 1961	April 12, 1962	[data missing]
National Road from Cumberland to Wheeling	Select	December 12, 1822	May 3, 1823	Select committee expired
National Telegraph Company	Select	April 5, 1866	July 28, 1866	Select committee expired
National University	Standing	December 10, 1810	March 3, 1817	[data missing]
National Water Resources	Select	April 20, 1959	January 30, 1961	Select committee expired
Naval Affairs	Standing	December 10, 1816	January 2, 1947	Merged with Armed Services
Naval Supplies	Select	January 25, 1864	June 29, 1864	Select committee expired
Nicaragua Canal	Select	December 30, 1895	March 3, 1901	Official title: Construction of the Nicaragua Canal; Select committee expired
Nicaraguan Claims	Select	February 5, 1879	March 3, 1895	Select committee expired
Nine Foot Channel from the Great Lakes to the Gulf	Select	January 25, 1923	February 3, 1925	Select committee expired
Nomination of Amos Kendall	Select	March 10, 1830	April 27, 1830	Nomination to be United States Postmaster General
Nutrition and Human Needs	Select	July 30, 1968	December 31, 1977	Transferred to Agriculture, Nutrition, and Forestry
Occupation of the Columbia River	Select	February 7, 1838	July 9, 1838	Select committee expired
Official Conduct	Special	January 18, 1977	March 10, 1977	[data missing]
Ohio-Michigan Boundary	Select	December 14, 1831	March 20, 1832	Select committee expired
Ohio-Michigan Boundary	Select	December 22, 1835	July 4, 1836	[data missing]
Old-Age Pension System	Select	June 20, 1941	December 16, 1942	Select committee expired
Omaha Exposition	Select	July 8, 1898	March 3, 1899	Select committee expired
Preservation of Order in the Galleries	Select	March 8, 1861	March 8, 1861	Official title: Additional Arrangements for the Preservation of Order in the Galleries; Select committee expired
Ordnance and Gunnery	Select	August 2, 1882	March 3, 1883	Renamed Ordnance and War Ships
Ordnance and Projectiles	Select	August 2, 1882	February 9, 1883	Official title: Heavy Ordnance and Projectiles; Select committee expired
Ordnance and War Ships	Select	July 3, 1844	February 8, 1886	Select committee expired
Ordnance Stores	Select	February 29, 1872	March 11, 1872	Official title: Investigate all Sales Ordnance Stores by the Government of the United States; Select committee expired
Oregon Railroad	Select	June 27, 1848	August 14, 1848	Select committee expired
Oregon Territory	Select	December 10, 1838	March 3, 1843	Select committee expired
Organization of Congress	Special	December 1945	March 4, 1946	Consisted of the Senate members of the Joint Committee on the Organization of Congress
Organization of Congress	Special	August 26, 1966	October 14, 1968	Operated concurrently with the Joint Committee on the Organization of Congress
Organized Crime in Interstate Commerce	Special	May 3, 1950	August 31, 1951	Official title: Investigate Organized Crime in Interstate Commerce
Outrages in Southern States	Select	January 19, 1871	March 12, 1873	Select committee expired
Overland Mail Service	Select	March 3, 1865	March 3, 1865	Official title: Examine the Condition of the Overland Mail Service; Select committee expired
Pacific Islands and Puerto Rico	Standing	December 15, 1899	February 5, 1920	Renamed Pacific Islands, Puerto Rico and the Virgin Islands
Pacific Islands, Puerto Rico and the Virgin Islands	Standing	February 5, 1920	April 18, 1921	[data missing]
Pacific Railroad (1861–1873)	Select	January 4, 1854	December 22, 1863	Became a standing committee in 1863
Pacific Railroad (1861–1873)	Select	December 22, 1863	March 12, 1873	Replaced by Railroads
Pacific Railroads	Standing	March 15, 1893	April 18, 1921	Separate and distinct from the Committee on the Pacific Railroad
Pacific Railway Commission	Special	January 24, 1888	March 3, 1893	[data missing]
Patent Office	Select	December 31, 1835	April 28, 1836	Replaced by Patents and the Patent Office
Patents	Standing	March 8, 1869	January 2, 1947	Duties moved to United States Senate Judiciary Subcommittee on Patents, Copyrights, and Trademarks
Patents and the Patent Office	Standing	September 7, 1837	March 8, 1869	Renamed Patents
Peale's Portrait of Washington	Select	January 17, 1825	January 25, 1825	Select committee expired
Pensacola Navy Yard Surrender	Select	July 25, 1861	April 18, 1862	Official title: Inquire into the Circumstances of the Surrender of the Pensacola Navy Yard and Destruction of Public Property at the Norfolk Navy Yard and at the Harpers Ferry Armory; Select committee expired
Pensions	Standing	December 10, 1816	January 2, 1947	[data missing]
Petroleum Resources	Special	March 13, 1944	January 31, 1947	[data missing]
Philippines	Standing	December 15, 1899	April 18, 1921	See also: Lodge Committee, a 1902 investigation by the Committee on the Philippines into war crimes committed during the Philippine–American War
Philippines Economic Condition	Special	June 18, 1934	May 3, 1935	Investigate Economic Activities in the Philippines
Plueropneumonia among Animals	Select	January 19, 1881	March 3, 1881	Select committee expired
Letter from Mr. Poindexter	Select	February 21, 1835	March 2, 1835	Select committee expired
Political Activities, Lobbying, and Campaign Contributions	Special	February 22, 1956	May 31, 1957	[data missing]
Post Office and Civil Service	Standing	January 2, 1947	February 11, 1977	Merger of Civil Service and Post Office and Post Roads; Succeeded by Governmental Affairs
Post Office Department	Select	December 5, 1830	March 3, 1831	Official title: Investigation of the Post Office Department; Select committee expired
Post Office Leases	Select	April 18, 1930	July 1, 1932	Select committee expired
Post Office and Post Roads	Standing	December 10, 1816	January 2, 1947	Replaced by Post Office and Civil Service
Post-War Economic Policy and Planning	Special	March 12, 1943	February 3, 1947	[data missing]
Potomac River Front	Select	December 13, 1881	March 3, 1911	Official title: Investigate the Potomac River Front Improvement; Select committee expired
POW/MIA Affairs	Select	August 2, 1991	January 2, 1993	Select committee expired
Preserve Historical Records of the Senate	Special	July 28, 1958	April 2, 1959	[data missing]
Presidential and Senatorial Campaign Expenditures	Special	June 13, 1934	January 10, 1935	[data missing]
Presidential Campaign Activities	Select	February 7, 1973	June 27, 1974	Watergate Committee; Select committee expired
Presidential Campaign Expenditures	Special	April 30, 1928	January 21, 1929	[data missing]
President's Message Refusing to Furnish a Paper to Senate	Select	December 19, 1833	June 30, 1834	Select committee expired
Printing	Standing	December 15, 1841	January 2, 1947	Replaced by Joint Committee on Printing; Also listed as a Joint Committee from 1861 to 1883.
Public Printing Investigation	Select	January 24, 1860	May 31, 1860	Official title: Investigate Public Printing.; Select committee expired
Private Claims Commission	Select	December 18, 1854	March 3, 1855	Establishing a Private Claims Commission; Select committee expired
Private Land Claims	Standing	December 26, 1826	April 18, 1921	Merged with Committee on Claims
Privileges and Elections	Standing	March 10, 1871	January 2, 1947	Transferred to Rules and Administration
Propaganda Affecting Taxation and Soldiers' Bonus	Select	January 17, 1924	March 3, 1925	Investigate whether "the profiteers of the war are now contributing to defeat the soldiers' adjusted compensation bill by money or influence."; Select committee expired
Propaganda or Money Alleged Used by Foreign Governments	Special	December 9, 1927	January 9, 1929	[data missing]
Protection of Life and Health in Passenger Ships	Select	December 20, 1854	March 3, 1855	See also Select Committee on Sickness on Emigrant Ships; Select committee expired
Public Buildings	Select	December 16, 1819	May 15, 1820	Select committee expired
Public Buildings and Grounds	Standing	December 6, 1838	January 2, 1947	Public Buildings, 1838–1855 joint committee 1856–1883; Transferred to Public Works.
Public Distress	Select	June 6, 1894	August 28, 1894	Select committee expired
Public Expenditures	Standing	March 22, 1909	March 3, 1911	[data missing]
Public Health and National Quarantine	Standing	March 19, 1896	April 18, 1921	Preceded by Epidemic Diseases
Public Lands	Standing	December 10, 1816	April 18, 1921	Renamed Public Lands and Surveys
Public Lands	Standing	January 2, 1947	January 28, 1948	Restored in 1947; Renamed Interior and Insular Affairs
Public Lands and Surveys	Standing	April 18, 1921	January 2, 1947	Renamed Public Lands
Public Works	Standing	January 2, 1947	February 11, 1977	Renamed Environment and Public Works
Publication of the Treaty of Washington	Select	May 12, 1871	May 25, 1871	Official title: Investigate How and by Whom the Treaty of Washington was Made Public; Select committee expired
Purchasing Boyd Reilly's Gas Apparatus	Select	May 6, 1834	March 3, 1839	Select committee expired
Quadrocentennial	Select	December 12, 1889	March 3, 1895	Renamed Select Committee on International Expositions
Railroads	Standing	March 12, 1873	April 18, 1921	Preceded by the Committee on the Pacific Railroad
Readjustment of Service Pay	Special	February 16, 1922	March 22, 1922	[data missing]
Reconstruction and Production	Select	April 17, 1920	March 3, 1921	Housing shortage after World War I.; Select committee expired
Reconstruction Finance Corporation	Select	July 11, 1932	January 13, 1933	Select committee expired
Reduction of Congressional Salaries	Select	December 19, 1820	March 3, 1821	Select committee expired
Reforestation	Select	January 22, 1923	January 10, 1924	Select committee expired
Remodeling the Senate Chamber	Special	July 17, 1945	April 2, 1951	Official title: Reconstruction of Senate Roof and Skylights and Remodeling of Senate Chamber
Removal of Political Disabilities	Select	March 20, 1869	March 12, 1873	14th Amendment
Representative Reform	Select	January 13, 1869	March 3, 1869	Select committee expired
Retired List for the Army and the Navy	Select	June 12, 1848	August 3, 1848	Select committee expired
Retrenchment	Standing	December 9, 1844	March 12, 1873	[data missing]
Revenue Collections in North Carolina	Special	March 2, 1882	February 12, 1883	[data missing]
Revision of the Laws	Standing	March 8, 1869	January 14, 1928	[data missing]
Revolutionary Claims	Standing	December 16, 1832	April 18, 1921	Merged with Claims
Revolutionary Officers	Select	December 18, 1827	May 26, 1828	Select committee expired
Rivers and Harbors Convention in Chicago	Select	June 19, 1848	August 14, 1848	Official title: Memorial of the Chicago Convention on the Rivers and Harbors of the United States; Select committee expired
Roads and Canals	Select	February 8, 1820	January 18, 1830	Became a standing committee
Roads and Canals	Select	January 18, 1830	March 3, 1857	[data missing]
Letter of Mr. Ruggles	Select	February 22, 1838	April 12, 1838	Select committee expired
Rules	Standing	December 3, 1867	June 23, 1874	Official title: Select Committee to Revise the Rules of the Senate; Became a standing committee
Rules	Standing	June 23, 1874	January 2, 1947	Renamed Rules and Administration
Sale of Arms to French Agents	Select	February 29, 1872	March 11, 1872	Select committee expired
Sale of Public Lands	Select	March 31, 1836	June 15, 1836	Official title: Sale of Public Lands and the Means of preventing Their Monopoly; Select committee expired
Violation of the Injunction of Secrecy	Select	April 29, 1844	May 8, 1844	Select committee expired
Secret and Confidential Government Documents	Special	August 15, 1972	October 12, 1973	To propose guidelines for handling classified documents submitted to the Senate
Security and Cooperation in Europe	Special	November 18, 1983	1986	Senate committee terminated. See also the Commission on Security and Cooperation in Europe
Secret Military Assistance to Iran and the Nicaraguan Opposition	Select	January 12, 1987	January 2, 1989	Iran-Contra Committee; Select committee expired
Seminole War	Select	December 18, 1818	May 15, 1820	Select committee expired
Senate Administrative Services	Select	June 20, 1890	March 3, 1891	Official title: State of the Administrative Service of the Senate; Select committee expired
Senate Committee System (Temporary Select)	Select	March 31, 1976	February 11, 1977	[data missing]
Senate Committee System (Temporary Select)	Select	June 6, 1984	December 14, 1984	[data missing]
Senate Reception Room	Special	August 2, 1955	May 1, 1957	[data missing]
Senatorial Campaign Expenditures	Special	May 27, 1938	July 7, 1943	. Byrd lists a similar committee from January 5, 1942, to January 6, 1943.
Senatorial Campaign of 1930	Select	April 10, 1930	December 3, 1931	Related to Senator James Thomas Heflin’s charges of fraud Select committee expired
Senatorial Elections	Select	May 19, 1926	March 22, 1928	Select committee expired
Settlement of the Slavery Question	Select	April 19, 1850	September 30, 1850	Known as the Committee of Thirteen. Not listed in Stubbs.; Select committee expired
Shiloh National Park	Select	June 13, 1834	June 18, 1834	Official title: Investigate Abuses at Shiloh National Park; Select committee expired
Ship Purchase Lobby	Special	February 15, 1915	January 5, 1916	[data missing]
Sickness on Emigrant Ships	Select	December 7, 1853	August 2, 1854	Official title: Consider the Causes and Extent of Sickness on Emigrant Ships; Select committee expired
Silver	Special	August 16, 1935	August 2, 1946	Also known as the Special Silver Committee
Sioux and Crow Indians	Select	March 2, 1883	March 7, 1884	Select committee expired
Slave Trade	Select	December 10, 1816	March 3, 1819	Select committee expired
Slavery and the Treatment of Freedmen	Select	January 13, 1864	February 29, 1864	Select committee expired
Small Business	Select	February 20, 1950	March 25, 1981	Became a standing committee, Small Business and Entrepreneurship
Smithsonian Institution	Select	April 30, 1846	August 10, 1846	Select committee expired
Space and Astronautics	Special	February 6, 1958	March 11, 1959	Replaced by the Committee on Aeronautical and Space Sciences
Standards and Conduct	Select	July 24, 1964	February 11, 1977	Transferred to Committee on Ethics
Standards, Weights, and Measures	Select	December 18, 1901	March 22, 1909	Became a standing committee
Standards, Weights, and Measures	Select	March 22, 1909	April 18, 1921	Preceded by a select committee
Small Business Enterprises(Special)	Special	October 8, 1940	February 20, 1950	Also known as Special Committee to Study Problems of American Small Business; Replaced by Small Business
Steel Producing Capacity of the United States	Select	July 3, 1884	March 3, 1885	Select committee expired
Tariff Bill of 1828	Special	January 2, 1849	March 3, 1849	Official title: Repealing the First Section of the Tariff Bill of 1828
Tariff Commission	Select	March 11, 1926	May 28, 1928	Select committee expired
Tariff Regulation	Select	February 25, 1823	March 3, 1923	Select committee expired
Tariff Bill	Select	February 13, 1833	March 2, 1833	Select committee expired
Taxation of Government Securities and Salaries	Special	June 16, 1938	September 18, 1940	[data missing]
Telepost	Select	July 17, 1914	March 4, 1915	Proposal to use the St. Louis to Chicago telepost by the U.S. Post Office Department.
Tennessee Centennial Exposition	Select	May 12, 1896	March 3, 1897	[data missing]
Termination National Emergency	Special	January 6, 1973	December 20, 1974	[data missing]
Territories	Standing	March 25, 1844	April 18, 1921	Renamed Territories and Insular Possessions
Territories and Insular Possessions	Standing	April 18, 1921	June 17, 1929	Renamed Territorial and Insular Affairs
Territorial and Insular Affairs	Standing	June 17, 1929	January 2, 1947	Replaced by Interior and Insular Affairs
Third Degree Ordeal	Standing	April 30, 1910	August 4, 1911	[data missing]
Thirteen on the Disturbed Condition of the Country	Select	December 18, 1860	December 31, 1860	Also known as the ‘’’Committee of Thirteen’’’ Select committee expired
Traffic with Rebels in Texas	Select	January 4, 1871	March 3, 1871	Official title: Investigate Alleged Traffic with Rebels in Texas; Select committee expired
Transportation and Sale of Meat Products	Select	May 16, 1888	April 18, 1921	Select committee expired
Transportation Routes to the Seaboard	Select	December 16, 1872	March 19, 1879	Became a standing committee
Transportation Routes to the Seaboard	Select	March 19, 1879	April 18, 1921	[data missing]
Treasury Department Account Discrepancies	Select	November 19, 1877	April 28, 1880	Official title: Investigate the Books and Accounts of the Treasury Department in Relation to the Discrepancies and Alternations of the Official Report; Select committee expired
Treasury Printing Bureau	Select	March 13, 1867	December 2, 1867	Official title: Examine the Management of the Treasury Printing Bureau; Select committee expired
Trespassers upon Indian Lands	Select	December 18, 1905	April 18, 1921	Select committee expired
Unemployment and Relief	Select	June 10, 1937	January 16, 1939	[data missing]
Unemployment Insurance	Standing	February 28, 1931	1932	[data missing]
Unemployment Problems	Special	September 12, 1959	March 30, 1960	[data missing]
Vaccination	Select	January 22, 1828	February 21, 1828	Select committee expired
Ventilation and Acoustics	Select	December 1903	December 1907	Select committee expired
Veterans Bureau Investigation	Select	March 2, 1923	March 3, 1925	Select committee expired
Virgin Islands	Select	April 1, 1935	January 20, 1936	Official title: Investigate the Government of the Virgin Islands; Select committee expired
Wages and Prices of Commodities	Select	February 9, 1910	June 23, 1910	Official title: Investigate Wages and Prices of Commodities; Select committee expired
War Finance Corporation Loans	Select	June 7, 1924	March 9, 1925	Official title: Investigate Certain Loans Made by the War Finance Corporation; Select committee expired
Washington City Centennial	Select	December 7, 1898	December 12, 1900	Select committee expired
Washington City Charter	Select	June 5, 1840	July 21, 1840	Official title: Modifying the Charter of the City of Washington June 5, 1840; Select committee expired
Washington Railway and Electrical Company	Special	April 16, 1917	October 6, 1917	Investigation of the causes of a strike
Weights and Measures	Select	December 10, 1816	March 3, 1817	Select committee expired
Whitewater Committee	Special	May 17, 1995	June 18, 1996	Official title: Investigate Whitewater Development Corporation and Related Matters
Wildlife Resources	Special	April 17, 1930	June 1946	Stubbs lists committee as terminating on January 21, 1931.
Woman Suffrage	Select	January 9, 1882	April 18, 1921	Became a standing committee in 1909
Wool Production	Special	July 10, 1935	May 29, 1946	Official title: Investigate the Production, Transportation, and Marketing of Wool
Year 2000 Technology Problem	Special	April 2, 1998	February 29, 2000	

== Defunct joint committees ==
Committee	Type	Established	Terminated	Notes
Alcohol in the Arts	Select	June 3, 1896	December 17, 1897	[data missing]
Amending the Constitution on Presidential and Vice Presidential Elections	Standing	January 30, 1854	August 7, 1854	[data missing]
American Shipbuilding	Select	August 7, 1882	December 15, 1882	[data missing]
Armor Plant Costs	Special	June 30, 1914	February 24, 1915	[data missing]
Atomic Energy	Standing	August 1, 1946	September 30, 1977	Preceded by the Senate Special Committee on Atomic Energy.
United States Congressional Joint Committee on Arrangements for the Bicentennial	Standing	September 5, 1975	October 1, 1976	[data missing]
Aviation Policy Board	Standing	July 30, 1947	December 31, 1948	
Banking and Currency	Standing	March 4, 1923	March 3, 1925	[data missing]
Budget Control	Standing	December 7, 1880	August 8, 1882	[data missing]
Centennial of the Laying of the Capitol Cornerstone, Celebrate the	Standing	August 17, 1893	August 28, 1894	[data missing]
Centennial of the Telegraph, Commemorate the	Standing	1943	1945	78th Congress.
Charities and Reformatory Institutions in the District of Columbia, Investigate	Standing	June 11, 1896	March 28, 1898	[data missing]
United States Congressional Joint Committee on Chickamauga and Chattanooga National Military Park, Dedication of	Standing	February 9, 1895	March 26, 1896	[data missing]
Chinese Immigration, Investigate	Standing	July 17, 1876	February 27, 1877	[data missing]
Civil Service Retirement Act	Standing	1925	1927	69th Congress.
Condition of Affairs in the Late Insurrectionary States, Inquire into the	Standing	April 10, 1871	February 19, 1872	Investigation of the Ku Klux Klan.
Condition of the States which Formed the So-Called Confederate States, Inquire into the	Standing	December 13, 1865	June 8, 1866	American Civil War.
Conditions in Alaska, Investigation of	Standing	March 4, 1911	April 4, 1911	[data missing]
Conditions of Indian Tribes	Special	March 3, 1865	January 26, 1867	Committee expired after releasing report.
Conduct of the War	Standing	December 10, 1861	June 20, 1865	American Civil War.
Congressional Operations	Standing	October 26, 1970	February 11, 1977	Functions transferred to the Senate Committee on Rules and Administration
Congressional Salaries, Investigate	Standing	March 4, 1923	May 1, 1924	[data missing]
Construction of a Building for a Museum of History and Technology for the Smithsonian	Standing	June 28, 1955	September 15, 1965	[data missing]
Control of Aircraft for Seacoast Defense, Investigate	Standing	March 4, 1929	March 3, 1931	[data missing]
Defense Production	Standing	September 8, 1950	February 11, 1977	[data missing]
Deficit Reduction	Select	August 2, 2011	November 21, 2011	[data missing]
Determine what Employment may be Furnished Federal Prisoners	Standing	March 2, 1923	December 3, 1923	[data missing]
Dirigible Disasters, Investigate	Standing	April 20, 1933	June 14, 1933	[data missing]
Disposition of (Useless) Executive Papers	Standing	February 16, 1889	July 7, 1943	Renamed the Joint Committee on Disposition of Executive Papers.
Joint Committee on Disposition of Executive Papers	Standing	July 7, 1943	June 23, 1970	[data missing]
District of Columbia, to Inquire into the Affairs of the	Standing	February 5, 1874	June 16, 1874	[data missing]
District of Columbia Public Parks	Standing	June 30, 1906	January 15, 1907	[data missing]
Economic Report	Standing	February 20, 1946	June 18, 1956	Renamed the Joint Economic Committee.
Enrolled Bills	Standing	July 27, 1789	August 14, 1876	Divided into the House Committee on Enrolled Bills and the Senate Committee on Enrolled Bills.
Eradication of the Mediterranean Fruit Fly	Standing	August 19, 1940	October 27, 1941	[data missing]
Fiscal Relations between the District of Columbia and the United States (1915)	March 3, 1915	January 6, 1916	[data missing]	[data missing]
Fiscal Relations between the District of Columbia and the United States (1922)	June 29, 1922	February 24, 1923	[data missing]	[data missing]
Federal Aid in Construction of Post Roads	Standing	August 24, 1912	November 25, 1914	[data missing]
Federal Reserve System	Standing	March 4, 1923	March 3, 1925	[data missing]
Ford's Theater Disaster	Standing	August 18, 1894	February 25, 1897	Preceded by the Senate Select Committee on the Ford Theater Disaster.
Foreign Economic Cooperation	Standing	April 3, 1948	March 3, 1950	[data missing]
Forestry	Standing	June 14, 1938	March 23, 1941	[data missing]
General Parcel Post, to Investigate	Standing	August 24, 1912	February 12, 1915	[data missing]
Government for the District of Columbia, to Frame a Form of	Standing	August 14, 1876	January 11, 1877	[data missing]
Government Organization	Standing	February 3, 1937	August 21, 1937	[data missing]
Harriman Geographic Code System	Standing	March 4, 1927	February 7, 1929	[data missing]
Hawaii	Standing	August 21, 1937	February 15, 1938	[data missing]
Housing	Standing	July 25, 1947	March 15, 1948	[data missing]
High Cost of Living	Standing	1919	1921	66th Congress.
Immigration and Nationality Policy	Standing	June 27, 1952	October 26, 1970	[data missing]
Inaugurating Washington's Statue, Making Arrangement for	Standing	February 16, 1860	February 25, 1860	[data missing]
Inaugural Ceremonies	see note			Convened every four years after the quadrennial presidential election.
Interior Department and Forestry Service, to Investigate the	Standing	January 19, 1910	March 4, 1911	[data missing]
Internal Revenue Taxation	Standing	February 26, 1926	October 4, 1976	Renamed the Joint Committee on Taxation
Interstate Commerce	Standing	July 20, 1916	March 3, 1919	[data missing]
Interstate and Foreign Commerce	Standing	July 20, 1916	March 3, 1919	[data missing]
Labor Management Relations	Standing	June 23, 1947	April 11, 1949	[data missing]
Code of Laws for the District of Columbia (1832)	[data missing]	May 22, 1832	February 14, 1833	Preceded by the Joint Committee to Prepare a Code of Laws for the District of Columbia (1828)
Code of Laws for the District of Columbia, to Prepare a (1828)	[data missing]	February 5, 1828	February 12, 1828	[data missing]
Legislative Budget	Standing	January 2, 1947	January 3, 1971	[data missing]
Muscle Shoals	Standing	March 13, 1926	June 21, 1926	[data missing]
Navajo-Hopi Indian Administration	Standing	April 19, 1950	January 6, 1973	[data missing]
Naval Affairs	Standing	January 12, 1894	August 28, 1894	[data missing]
Naval Personnel	Standing	January 12, 1894	March 3, 1895	[data missing]
Northern Pacific Railroad Land Grants, Investigation of	Standing	June 5, 1924	April 19, 1929	[data missing]
Ordnance	Select	March 30, 1867	February 25, 1869	[data missing]
Organization of Congress (1946)	Special	December 15, 1944	May 31, 1946	Adoption of the Legislative Reorganization Act of 1946
Organization of Congress (1965)	Special	March 9, 1965	June 28, 1966	Adoption of the Legislative Reorganization Act of 1970
Organization of Congress (1991)	Special	August 6, 1992	November 23, 1993	Comprehensive reorganization bills never reached the House or Senate floor during the 103rd Congress, but most recommendations were implemented through the Congressional Accountability Act of 1995 in the 104th Congress.
Pacific Coast Naval Bases	Standing	June 4, 1920	December 31, 1920	[data missing]
Pacific Islands, to Study	Standing	June 18, 1948	December 31, 1948	[data missing]
Pearl Harbor Attack, Investigation of the	Standing	September 11, 1945	July 16, 1946	[data missing]
Phosphate Resource of the United States, to Investigate	Standing	June 16, 1938	January 16, 1941	[data missing]
Police and Preservation of the Capital	Standing	December 12, 1825	December 23, 1825	[data missing]
Postage on 2nd Class Mail Matter and Compensation for Transportation of Mail	Standing	August 24, 1912	March 3, 1915	[data missing]
Postal Salaries	Standing	February 28, 1919	March 3, 1921	[data missing]
Postal Service	Standing	April 24, 1920	February 8, 1924	[data missing]
Railroad Retirement Legislation	Standing	October 18, 1951	January 9, 1953	[data missing]
Safety of Roofs over Senate and House Wings of the Capitol, Investigate	Standing	January 13, 1821	February 6, 1821	[data missing]
Readjustment of Service Pay	Special	February 16, 1922	March 22, 1922	[data missing]
Reclassification of Salaries	Standing	March 1, 1919	March 12, 1920	[data missing]
Reconstruction	Standing	December 12, 1865	March 3, 1867	Succeeded by the House Select Committee on Reconstruction
Revision of the Laws	Standing	March 2, 1907	March 15, 1910	Separate from House and Senate committees of the same name
Reduction of Nonessential Federal Expenditures	Standing	September 20, 1941	July 12, 1974	[data missing]
Reorganization	Standing	December 29, 1920	June 3, 1924	[data missing]
Reorganization of the Administrative Branch of the Government	Standing	December 29, 1920	June 3, 1924	[data missing]
Reorganization of the Army	Standing	June 18, 1878	December 12, 1878	[data missing]
Reorganize the Civil Service in the Departments	Standing	February 1, 1869	March 3, 1869	[data missing]
Repairs and Furnishings of the Executive Mansion, to Examine the Accounts for	Standing	March 11, 1867	November 10, 1868	[data missing]
Retrenchment	Standing	July 19, 1866	March 3, 1871	[data missing]
Revise and Equalize the Pay of the Employees of Each House	Standing	March 6, 1867	March 3, 1869	[data missing]
Rural Credits	Standing	March 4, 1915	January 4, 1916	64th Congress.
Salaries of Officers and Employees of the Senate and the House, to Investigate the	Standing	February 28, 1929	June 14, 1929	[data missing]
San Francisco Disaster	Standing	January 16, 1854	February 16, 1854	[data missing]
Scientific Bureaus	Standing	July 7, 1884	June 8, 1886	[data missing]
Second Class Mail Matter	Standing	June 26, 1906	January 28, 1907	[data missing]
Second Class Mail Matter and Compensation for Rail Mail Service	Standing	August 24, 1912	December 8, 1914	[data missing]
Selective Service Deferments	Standing	April 8, 1943	March 31, 1947	[data missing]
Senate Chamber and Hall of the House of Representatives	Standing	May 10, 1864	February 20, 1865	[data missing]
Smithsonian Bequest	Standing	February 19, 1844	August 10, 1846	[data missing]
State, War and Navy Department Building	Standing	August 5, 1882	March 3, 1883	[data missing]
System of Shortime Rural Credits, to Investigate	Standing	May 31, 1920	June 30, 1922	[data missing]
Tax Evasion and Avoidance	Standing	June 11, 1937	August 5, 1937	75th Congress.
Temporary National Economic Committee	[data missing]	June 16, 1938	April 3, 1941	The TNEC was established by a joint resolution of Congress (52 Stat. 705) to study monopolies and concentration of economic power.
Tennessee Valley Authority	Standing	April 5, 1938	April 1, 1939	[data missing]
Transfer of the Indian Bureau	Standing	June 18, 1878	January 31, 1879	[data missing]
Veterans' Affairs	Standing	June 30, 1932	May 26, 1933	Restored as House Committee on Veterans' Affairs in 1947 and Senate Committee on Veterans' Affairs in 1970.
Washington (DC) Metropolitan Problems	[data missing]	August 29, 1957	August 23, 1960	[data missing]
Washington Aqueduct Tunnel, to Investigate Work on the	Standing	October 9, 1888	February 26, 1889	[data missing]
