= United States Senate Committee on Railroads =

The Senate Committee on Railroads is a defunct committee of the United States Senate. It succeeded the Committee on the Pacific Railroad on March 12, 1873. The committee reviewed legislation and matters related to railroad transportation on the United States. The committee existed until April 8, 1921, when it was abolished due to inactivity. The committee's role waned after the 50th Congress (1887-89) as other Senate committees acquired legislative jurisdiction over railroad matters. The United States Senate Committee on Interstate Commerce, in particular, focused on regulating railroad rates and assuring safety of railroad passengers and crews. A separate Committee on Pacific Railroads also operated from 1893 to 1921, investigating the financial status of the Union Pacific Railroad.

While it no longer formerly exists as a standing committee, the Senate still conducts oversight over the railroad industry through the Senate Commerce, Science, and Transportation Committee and its Surface Transportation and United Interstate Commerce subcommittees.

== Chairmen 1873-1921 ==
- 1873-1875: William Stewart (R-Nevada)
- 1875-1877: J. Rodman West (R-Louisiana)
- 1877-1879: John H. Mitchell (R-Oregon)
- 1879-1880: Matt Ransom (D-North Carolina)
- 1880-1881: L.Q.C. Lamar (D-Mississippi)
- 1881-1883: William Pitt Kellogg (R-Louisiana)
- 1883-1887: Philetus Sawyer (R-Wisconsin)
- 1887-1889: Dwight Sabin (R-Minnesota)
- 1889-1891: John H. Mitchell (R-Oregon)
- 1891-1893: Lyman R. Casey (R-North Dakota)
- 1893-1894: Johnson Camden (D-West Virginia)
- 1894-1895: John Martin (D-Kansas)
- 1895-1905: Clarence D. Clark (R-Wyoming)
- 1905-1907: J. Frank Allee (R-Delaware)
- 1907-1911: Morgan Bulkeley (R-Connecticut)
- 1911-1913: Thomas P. Gore (D-Oklahoma)
- 1913-1915: George C. Perkins (R-California)
- 1915-1917: James D. Phelan (D-California)
- 1917-1919: Peter G. Gerry (D-Rhode Island)
- 1919-1921: Irvine L. Lenroot (R-Wisconsin)
