= United States House Committee on Accounts =

The United States House Committee on Accounts was a standing committee of the US House of Representatives from 1803 to 1946. It had purview over the financial accounts of the House's contingent fund, as well as some matters related to facilities and staffing. In 1946, it was merged into the newly formed the Committee on House Administration.

== Jurisdiction ==
Its jurisdiction covered all subjects "touching the expenditure of the contingent fund of the House, [and] the auditing and settling of all accounts which may be charged therein to the House." In addition, the committee was responsible for the accountability of officers of the House, the procurement of rooms for the use of House committees and for the Speaker, and for recommending and authorizing the employment of such persons as stenographers, reporters of debates, janitors, and clerks and staff assistants for committees, members and senators.

== History ==
The committee was created on December 27, 1803, and was made a standing committee in 1805. In 1911, the functions of the Committee on Ventilation and Acoustics were transferred to the Committee on Accounts, and in 1927 the functions of the Committee on Mileage were similarly transferred.

In 1946, the Committee on House Administration was created by the Legislative Reorganization Act of 1946, which superseded ten standing committees, assuming the jurisdictions and functions of some of the oldest and longest standing committees of the House. Among the merged committees were the House Committee on Accounts, along with the Committees on Enrolled Bills (created in 1789 as Joint Committee), Elections (created in 1794), Printing (created in 1846), Disposition of Executive Papers (created in 1889), Memorials (created in 1929), and some functions of the Joint Committee on the Library (created in 1806 as a Joint Committee).
