= Legislative Reorganization Act =

Legislative Reorganization Act may refer to either of two acts of the United States Congress that changed the procedures under which Congress operates:

- Legislative Reorganization Act of 1946
- Legislative Reorganization Act of 1970
