= United States House Committee on Coinage, Weights, and Measures =

U.S. standing committee from 1864 to 1946

The Committee on Coinage, Weights, and Measures (established as the Committee on a Uniform System of Coinage, Weights, and Measures) was a standing committee of the United States House of Representatives from 1864 to 1946.

== History ==
In 1864, the Committee on a Uniform System of Coinage, Weights, and Measures was established to relieve the House Committee on Ways and Means of part of its workload. The name was shortened to Committee on Coinage, Weights, and Measures in 1867. In 1921, the portion of the committee's jurisdiction relating to stabilization of the currency was transferred to the House Committee on Banking and Currency. Under the Legislative Reorganization Act of 1946, the coinage portion of its jurisdiction was also transferred to that committee, while its weights and measures jurisdiction was transferred to the House Committee on Interstate and Foreign Commerce, thus dissolving the committee.

== Jurisdiction ==
The jurisdiction of the Committee on Coinage, Weights, and Measures included the subjects listed in its name: coinage, weights, and measures. The coinage part of the jurisdiction included the defining and fixing of standards of value and the regulation of coinage and exchange. This included the coinage of silver and the purchase of bullion, the exchange of gold coins for gold bars, the subject of mutilated coins, and the coinage of souvenir and commemorative coins. The committee's jurisdiction also included legislation related to mints and assay offices and the establishment of legal standards of value in the insular possessions.

== Chairmen ==
Representative	Party	State	Congress(es)
John A. Kasson	Republican	Iowa	38th–39th
William D. Kelley	Republican	Pennsylvania	40th
David Heaton	Republican	North Carolina	41st
William D. Kelley	Republican	Pennsylvania	41st–42nd
Samuel Hooper	Republican	Massachusetts	42nd–43rd
Sherman Otis Houghton	Republican	California	43rd
Alexander H. Stephens	Democratic	Georgia	44th–46th
Horatio Gates Fisher	Republican	Pennsylvania	47th
Richard P. Bland	Democratic	Missouri	48th–50th
Charles Preston Wickham	Republican	Ohio	51st
Richard P. Bland	Democratic	Missouri	52nd–53rd
Charles Warren Stone	Republican	Pennsylvania	54th–55th
James H. Southard	Republican	Ohio	56th–59th
William B. McKinley	Republican	Illinois	60th–61st
Thomas W. Hardwick	Democratic	Georgia	62nd–63rd
William A. Ashbrook	Democratic	Ohio	64th–65th
Albert Henry Vestal	Republican	Indiana	66th–68th
Randolph Perkins	Republican	New Jersey	69th–71st
Andrew Lawrence Somers	Democratic	New York	72nd–78th
Compton I. White	Democratic	Idaho	79th
