= United States House Select Committee on the Memorial of the Agricultural Bank of Mississippi =

The Committee on the Memorial of the Agricultural Bank of Mississippi was a select committee of the United States House of Representatives that existed during the 27th Congress.

== History ==
The select committee was established January 7, 1842, when Representative William M. Gwin of Mississippi presented to the House a memorial from the president, directors, and company of the Agricultural Bank of Mississippi in Natchez, Mississippi. The memorial requested relief from Congress, specifically that interest the bank owed to the United States be remitted or forgiven.

The committee terminated April 9, 1842, when it submitted its final report to the House.

== Members ==
The select committee consisted of five members, and was chaired by William M. Gwin, Democrat of Mississippi. The committee consisted of three Democrats and two Whigs.

Members	Party	State
William M. Gwin, Chairman	Democratic	Mississippi
James M. Russell	Whig	Pennsylvania
Charles Hudson	Whig	Massachusetts
Joshua A. Lowell	Democratic	Maine
William O. Butler	Democratic	Kentucky

== Legislation ==
Committee Chairman William M. Gwin introduced a private bill, H.R. 345, on April 9, 1842, along with the committee report. The bill authorized the United States Treasury Department to settle with the bank "for the amount of moneys of the United States deposited in said bank" and to remit the interest on those amounts. The bill was referred to the Committee of the Whole House on the State of the Union.

The Committee of the Whole approved an amended version of the bill on June 25, 1842 This amended bill still provided relief to the bank, but tied the relief to expenses incurred by the bank when it received proceeds on behalf of the United States Government from the sale of lands from the Chickasaw cession in Mississippi and Alabama pursuant to an 1834 treaty between the United States and the Chickasaw Indians. The bill allowed the bank a credit for its expenses equal to the amount of interest on the proceeds then due to the United States.

The Senate approved the amended bill on August 11, and it was enacted August 16, 1842.

== See also ==
- List of defunct United States congressional committees
