= United States Senate Committee on Pacific Railroads =

The Senate Committee on Pacific Railroads is a defunct committee of the United States Senate. It was first established as a select committee in 1889 and became a standing committee on March 15, 1893. The committee is not to be confused with the Committee on the Pacific Railroad, which existed from 1861 to 1873.

The committee was appointed following an investigation into the finances of the Union Pacific Railroad, which was heavily indebted to the United States Government. The committee was terminated on April 18, 1921.

== Chairmen 1863-1921 ==
- 1893-1895: Calvin S. Brice, D-Ohio
- 1895-1900: John H. Gear, R-Iowa
- 1901-1905: Jonathan Dolliver, R-Iowa
- 1905-1907: Russell A. Alger, R-Michigan
- 1907-1911: Elmer J. Burkett, R-Nebraska
- 1911-1913: Robert L. Owen, D-Oklahoma
- 1913-1919: Frank B. Brandegee, R-Connecticut
- 1919-1921: Charles S. Thomas, D-Colorado
