= Committee of the Whole (United States House of Representatives) =

Largest US congressional committee

In the United States House of Representatives, a Committee of the Whole House is a congressional committee that includes all members of the House. In modern practice there is only one such committee, the Committee of the Whole House on the State of the Union, which has original consideration of all bills on the Union Calendar. While assembled, the House may resolve itself temporarily into a Committee of the Whole House. Business can then proceed with various procedural requirements relaxed. At the conclusion of business, the committee resolves to "rise" and reports its conclusions (typically in the form of an amended bill) or lack of conclusion to the speaker.

When the House resolves into a Committee of the Whole House, the speaker appoints another member to the chair, and this member is responsible for delivering the committee's report. Conventionally, the speaker appoints a member of the majority party who does not hold the chair of a standing committee. A Committee of the Whole House requires 100 members for a quorum as compared to the House's majority of 218, while only 25 members are required to force a recorded (rather than voice) vote as compared to the typical requirement of one-fifth of the members present.

== History ==
The tradition of a committee of the whole originates in the English House of Commons, where it is attested as early as 1607. In only a few years it became a near-daily process used to debate matters without representatives of the Crown present, and the custom was subsequently adopted by deliberative assemblies in other Crown provinces. The American Continental Congress, for example, established committees of the whole "to take into consideration the state of America."

The rules of the House in the 1st United States Congress expressly provided for the House, on any business day, to resolve itself into the Committee of the Whole House on the state of the Union. This procedure was used to discuss matters for which no specific action had been decided. Since 1807, the Committee has also been the recipient of the President's messages on the State of the Union. Other ad hoc committees of the whole were established and charged through the normal committee process, but in time, a custom developed whereby the Committee of the Whole House on the state of the Union considered public bills and a separate Committee of the Whole House considered all private bills. The Committee of the Whole House for private bills was abolished by the 106th Congress, which transferred their consideration to the House proper.

For most of the House's history, votes in the Committee of the Whole were off record. The Legislative Reorganization Act of 1970 provided for the recording of votes by name upon the request of 25 members, which is routine for amendment votes.

== Participation of non-voting delegates ==
In 1993, Delegate Eleanor Holmes Norton (D-DC), along with the Resident Commissioner from Puerto Rico and the delegates from Guam, the U.S. Virgin Islands, and American Samoa, received a limited vote in the Committee of the Whole, based on their right to vote in legislative committees. However, this limited vote stipulated if any of the delegates provided the deciding vote on an issue considered by the Committee of the Whole, a new vote would be conducted and the delegates would not be allowed to vote. The right of delegates to vote in Committee of the Whole was removed by the Republican majority in 1995 after that party gained control of Congress in the 1994 congressional elections. In January 2007, it was proposed by Democrats in the House that the 1993–1994 procedure be revived. The House approved the proposal with the adoption of H.Res. 78 by a vote of 226–191.

On January 5, 2011, at the start of the 112th Congress, the Republican-controlled House voted for a rules package that included stripping non-voting delegates of their votes in the Committee of the Whole. Delegate Norton proposed tabling the motion pending further study of the non-voting delegate issue, but the measure was defeated in a 225–188 party-line vote. Norton and her fellow non-voting delegates sought restoration of the right to vote in the Committee of the Whole at the start of the three subsequent congresses but were unable to overcome opposition from House Republicans. When Democrats regained the majority for the 116th United States Congress, they reinstated the right of delegates to vote in the committee.

== Former use in the Senate ==
Until 1930, the United States Senate considered all bills in the committee of the whole, or "quasi-committee," before a final debate. The usual rules of debate applied, but only amendments could be considered and tentatively approved. It was possible for a bill to go through four debates: consideration and reconsideration in quasi-committee, then final consideration and reconsideration in the Senate. This practice ended for bills and joint resolutions in 1930, and for treaties in 1986.

== See also ==
- List of United States House of Representatives committees
