= United States Senate Committee on Civil Service =

Former committee of the United States Senate

United States Senate Committee on Civil Service is a defunct committee of the United States Senate.

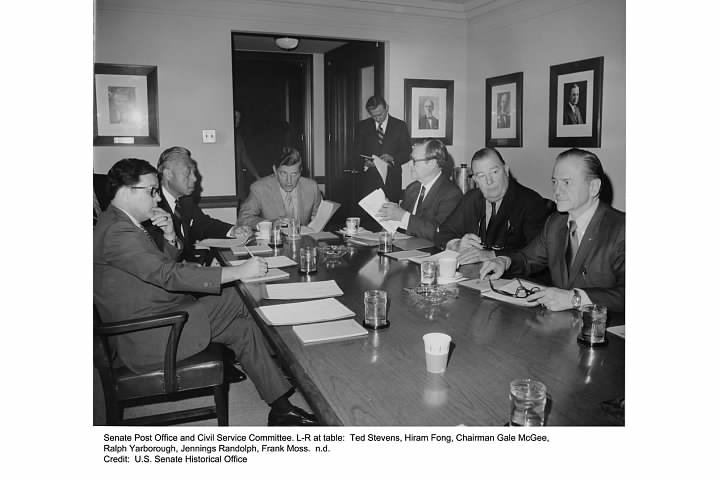
U.S. Senate Post Office and Civil Service Committee (L-R): Senators Ted Stevens (R-AK), Ranking Member Hiram Fong (R-HI), Chairman Gale McGee (D-WY), Ralph Yarborough (D-TX), Jennings Randolph (D-WV), and Frank Moss (D-UT).

The first standing Senate committee with jurisdiction over the civil service was the United States Senate Committee on Civil Service and Retrenchment, which was established on December 4, 1873, following unanimous approval of a resolution introduced by Henry B. Anthony of Rhode Island. On April 18, 1921, the committee was renamed the United States Senate Committee on Civil Service.

The Legislative Reorganization Act of 1946 retained the Committee on Civil Service and established the committee's jurisdiction over all the aspects of civil service, the Census Bureau and the government's gathering of statistics, and the National Archives. The act also transferred to the committee jurisdiction over the postal service. On April 17, 1947, as specified by S. 99 of the 80th United States Congress, the committee's name was changed from the Committee on Civil Service to the United States Senate Committee on Post Office and Civil Service.

The committee ceased to exist in February 1977, under S. Res. 4 of the 95th Congress when its functions were transferred to the Committee on Governmental Affairs.

In there were select or special committees pertaining to the Civil Service:

- United States Senate Select Committee to Investigate the Operation of the Civil Service, 1888-1889 (50th Congress)
- United States Senate Select Committee to Examine the Several Branches in the Civil Service, 1875-1921 (43rd-67th Congresses)
- United States Special Committee to Investigate the Administration of the Civil Service System, 1938-1941 (75th-76th Congresses)

== Chairmen of the Committee on Civil Service and Retrenchment, 1873-1921 ==
- George Wright (R-IA) 1873-1875
- Powell Clayton (R-AR) 1875-1877
- James G. Blaine (R-ME) 1877
- Henry Teller (R-CO) 1877-1879
- M. C. Butler (D-SC) 1879-1881
- Joseph Hawley (R-CT) 1881-1887
- Jonathan Chace (R-RI) 1887-1889
- Edward O. Wolcott (R-CO) 1889-1893
- Wilkinson Call (D-FL) 1893-1894
- Thomas Jarvis (D-NC) 1894-1895
- Jeter C. Pritchard (R-NC) 1895-1899
- Lucien Baker (R-KS) 1899-1901
- George C. Perkins (R-CA) 1901-1909
- Albert Cummins (R-IA) 1909-1913
- Atlee Pomerene (D-OH) 1913-1917
- Kenneth McKellar (D-TN) 1917-1919
- Thomas Sterling (R-SD) 1919-1921

== Chairmen of the Committee on Civil Service, 1921-1947 ==
- Thomas Sterling (R-SD) 1921-1923
- Robert Nelson Stanfield (R-OR) 1923-1925
- James Couzens (R-MI) 1925-1926
- Porter H. Dale (R-VT) 1926-1933
- William J. Bulow (D-SD) 1933-1943
- Kenneth McKellar (D-TN) 1943-1944
- Sheridan Downey (D-CA) 1944-1947

== Sources ==
- Chapter 15. Records of the Committee on Post Office and Civil Service and Related Committees, 1816-1968 Guide to the Records of the U.S. Senate at the National Archives (Record Group 46)
