= United States House Committee on Public Works =

Defunct U.S. House of Representatives committee

The United States House Committee on Public Works was a U.S. House committee, established in 1947 by the Legislative Reorganization Act of 1946, that had jurisdiction over infrastructure within the United States. It was dissolved in 1968 and superseded by the Committee on Transportation and Infrastructure.

== History ==
Established by the Legislative Reorganization Act of 1946, the Public Works Committee consolidated the responsibilities and jurisdictions of the Public Buildings and Grounds, Rivers and Harbors, Roads and Flood Control committees. These committees maintained their names, but became subcommittees of the Public Works committee. Through this period, the government invested strongly in building road and federal highway infrastructure, with profound effects on cities and suburbs in the country.

Other subcommittees included Beach Erosion (1947–48), Watershed Development (1959–68), Investigation of Questionable Trade Practices (select, 1951–52), Studying of Civil Works (select, 1947–48 and 1951–68), Federal Aid Highway Program (select, 1959–68), Montana Flood Damage (select, 1963–64), Economic Development Programs (select, 1965–68), Appalachian Regional Development (ad hoc, 1963–68), and 1967 Alaska Exposition (ad hoc, 1965–68).

The committee operated from the 80th Congress to the 90th Congress. It was dissolved in 1968 and superseded by the Committee on Transportation and Infrastructure.

== See also ==
- List of defunct United States congressional committees
