= United States Senate Committee on Aeronautical and Space Sciences =

The Committee on Aeronautical and Space Sciences was a standing committee of the United States Senate from 1958 until 1977, when it was folded into the U.S. Senate Committee on Commerce, Science and Transportation. It was preceded by the Special Committee on Space and Astronautics, which operated from February 6, 1958, to March 11, 1959.

== History ==
The Committee on Aeronautical and Space Sciences was established July 24, 1958, when the Senate adopted S. Res. 327, introduced by Senator Lyndon Johnson. The resolution also extended the term of the Special Committee on Space and Astronautics until March 11, 1959, so it could complete its final report. Many of the members of the special committee joined the new standing committee.

== Jurisdiction ==
The standing committee was given jurisdiction over the National Aeronautics and Space Administration and all aeronautical and space sciences generally. However, matters concerning the development of weapons systems or military operations were reserved for the Senate Armed Services Committee. However, the Space Committee was permitted to survey, review, and report on both military and civilian space activities of the United States. According to Senate Rule 25, as amended at the time, the committee was to consist of 16 Senators.

== Chairmen ==
=== Special Committee on Space and Astronautics ===
- Lyndon B. Johnson (D-TX) February 6, 1958 – March 11, 1959

=== Committee on Aeronautical and Space Sciences ===
- Lyndon B. Johnson (D-TX) 1958–1961
- Robert S. Kerr (D-OK) 1961–1963
- Clinton P. Anderson (D-NM) 1963–1973
- Frank E. Moss (D-UT) 1973–1977
- Wendell H. Ford (D-KY) January 10 – February 11, 1977
