= United States Congressional Joint Committee on the Organization of Congress =

The Joint Committee on the Organization of Congress is the name given to three separate temporary joint congressional committees established during the mid to late 20th century to study and make recommendations on measures to improve the structure of the U.S. Congress, including committees, staff, and other organizational matters.

== History ==
The committee existed in three different versions during the last 60 years, each with a set timetable and responsibilities.

=== 1945-1947 ===
The committee was established by S. Con. Res. 23, 78th Congress. It held 39 public hearings between March 3 and June 29, 1945, as well as four executive sessions. Over 100 witnesses testified, including 45 members of Congress, and an additional 37 members submitted statements. The recommendations of the committee led to streamlining of congressional committees and adoption of the Legislative Reorganization Act of 1946.

=== 1965-1966 ===
The committee was established on March 11, 1965, by S. Con. Res. 2, 89th United States Congress. Its mission was to study the operation of Congress and recommend improvements "with a view toward strengthening the Congress, simplifying its operations, improving its relationship with other branches of the United States Government, and enabling it better to meet its responsibilities under the Constitution."

The committee held hearings over a period of 5 months, taking testimony from 199 witnesses, including 106 members of Congress. The committee issued its final report (S. Rept. 1414) on July 28, 1966. This work eventually led to the passage of the Legislative Reorganization Act of 1970.

=== 1991-1994 ===
The last and most recent version of this committee attempted further reforms, some of which were adopted by Congress when Republicans gained control of the House and Senate after the 1994 congressional elections. Key among these was the Congressional Accountability Act of 1995 (Pub. L. 104–1 (text) (PDF)), which applied provisions of 11 major labor laws to Congress and its employees for the first time.

== Sources ==
- Schamel, Charles E.; Rephlo, Mary; Ross, Rodney; Kepley, David; Coren, Robert W.; Bradsher, James Gregory (May 26, 2021) [1989]. "Chapter 23: Records of the Joint Committees of Congress, 1789-1968". Guide to the Records of the United States House of Representatives at the National Archives, 1789-1989: Bicentennial Edition. National Archives and Records Administration. LCCN 88-607954. Doct. No. 100-245. Archived from the original on 2023-09-25.
- Schneider, Judy; Davis, Christopher M. (October 20, 2003). Reorganization of the House of Representatives: Modern Reform Efforts (Report). Congressional Research Service. RL31835. Archived from the original on 2024-08-10.
- Schneider, Judy; Davis, Christopher M.; Campbell, Colton C.; Palmer, Betsy (October 15, 2003). Reorganization of the Senate: Modern Reform Efforts (Report). Congressional Research Service. RL32112. Archived from the original on 2022-04-17.
