= United States House Committee on Invalid Pensions =

The United States House Committee on Invalid Pensions is a former committee of the United States House of Representatives from 1831 to 1946.

The committee was created on January 10, 1831, with jurisdiction over matters relating to pensions for disabled veterans. Originally, the jurisdiction of the committee included pensions from the War of 1812. The committee had become so overburdened with pensions from the Civil War, that on March 26, 1867, jurisdiction for pensions from the War of 1812 was transferred to the Committee on Revolutionary Pensions. Subsequently, jurisdiction of the Committee on Invalid Pensions included only matters relating to pensions of the Civil War, with the committee reporting general and special bills authorizing payments of pensions and bills for relief of soldiers of that war.

In 1939 the jurisdiction of the committee was changed to include, "the pensions of all the wars of the United States and peace-time service, other than the Spanish–American War, Philippine Insurrection, Boxer Rebellion, and World War", while those pensions that fell in the excluded categories were tended to by the Committee on Pensions.

The committee was abolished under the Legislative Reorganization Act of 1946 and its jurisdiction transferred, in large part, to the executive agencies.
