= Congressional oversight =

Oversight by the US Congress over the Executive Branch

Congressional oversight is oversight by the United States Congress over the executive branch, including the numerous U.S. federal agencies. Congressional oversight includes the review, monitoring, and supervision of federal agencies, programs, activities, and policy implementation. Congress exercises this power largely through its congressional committee system. Oversight also occurs in a wide variety of congressional activities and contexts. These include authorization, appropriations, investigative, and legislative hearings by standing committees; which is specialized investigations by select committees; and reviews and studies by congressional support agencies and staff.

Congress’s oversight authority derives from its "implied" powers in the Constitution, public laws, and House and Senate rules. It is an integral part of the American system of checks and balances.

Some scholars have questioned the efficacy of congressional oversight in ensuring bureaucratic performance and compliance with law.

== Constitutionality ==
Oversight is an implied rather than an expressed power under the U.S. Constitution. The government's charter does not explicitly grant Congress the authority to conduct inquiries or investigations of the executive, to have access to records or materials held by the executive, or to issue subpoenas for documents or testimony from the executive.

There was little discussion of the power to oversee, review, or investigate executive activity at the Constitutional Convention of 1787 or later in The Federalist Papers, which argued in favor of ratification of the Constitution. The lack of debate was because oversight and its attendant authority were seen as an inherent power of representative assemblies which enacted public law.

Oversight also derives from the many and varied express powers of the Congress in the Constitution. It is implied in the legislature's authority, among other powers and duties, to appropriate funds, enact laws, raise and support armies, provide for a Navy, declare war, and impeach and remove from office the president, vice president, and other civil officers. Congress could not reasonably or responsibly exercise these powers without knowing what the executive was doing; how programs were being administered, by whom, and at what cost; and whether officials were obeying the law and complying with legislative intent.

The Supreme Court of the United States has confirmed the oversight powers of Congress, subject to constitutional safeguards for civil liberties, on several occasions. In 1927, for instance, the court found that in investigating the administration of the Justice Department, Congress had the authority to consider a subject "on which legislation could be had or would be materially aided by the information which the investigation was calculated to elicit".

== Congressional control of agencies ==
If Congress believes that an agency has drifted from its original mandate, Congress can respond in a number of ways. Congress can pass a law to overrule agency decisions, or to narrow the agency's jurisdiction. Congress can use its appropriations power to restrict the agency's funding. Congress can also narrow the agency's regulatory authority. For example, in the 1980s Congress narrowed the U.S. Environmental Protection Agency's regulatory discretion using detailed substantive criteria to limit EPA rulemaking.

== Principles ==
Underlying the legislature's ability to oversee the executive are democratic principles as well as practical purposes. John Stuart Mill, the British Utilitarian philosopher, insisted that oversight was the key feature of a meaningful representative body: "The proper office of a representative assembly is to watch and control the government". As a young scholar, Woodrow Wilson equated oversight with lawmaking, which was usually seen as the supreme function of a legislature. He wrote, "Quite as important as legislation is vigilant oversight of administration".

The philosophical underpinning for oversight is the Constitution’s system of checks and balances among the legislature, executive, and judiciary. James Madison, known as the "Father of the Constitution", described the system in Federalist No. 51 as establishing "subordinate distributions of power, where the constant aim is to divide and arrange the several offices in such a manner that each may be a check on the other".

== Purposes ==
Oversight, as an outgrowth of this principle, ideally serves a number of overlapping objectives and purposes:

- improve the efficiency, economy, and effectiveness of governmental operations
- evaluate programs and performance
- detect and prevent poor administration, waste, abuse, arbitrary and capricious behavior, or illegal and unconstitutional conduct
- protect civil liberties and constitutional rights
- inform the general public and ensure that executive policies reflect the public interest
- gather information to develop new legislative proposals or to amend existing statutes
- ensure administrative compliance with legislative intent
- prevent executive encroachment on legislative authority and prerogatives

In sum, oversight is a way for Congress to check on, and check, the executive directors.

== Powers and prerogatives ==
=== U.S. Constitution ===
Although the U.S. Constitution grants no formal, express authority to oversee or investigate the executive or program administration, oversight is implied in Congress’s array of enumerated powers. The legislature is authorized to appropriate funds; raise and support armies; provide for and maintain a navy; declare war; provide for organizing and calling forth the Militia; regulate interstate and foreign commerce; establish post offices and post roads; advise and consent on treaties and presidential nominations (Senate); and impeach (House) and try (Senate) the president, vice president, and civil officers for treason, bribery, or other high crimes and misdemeanors. Reinforcing these powers is Congress’s broad authority "to make all laws which shall be necessary and proper for carrying into execution the foregoing powers, and all other powers vested by this Constitution in the Government of the United States, or in any Department or Officer thereof."

The authority to oversee derives from these constitutional powers. Congress could not carry them out reasonably or responsibly without knowing what the executive is doing; how programs are being administered, by whom, and at what cost; and whether officials are obeying the law and complying with legislative intent. The Supreme Court has legitimated Congress’s investigative power, subject to constitutional safeguards for civil liberties. In 1927, the court found that, in investigating the administration of the Department of Justice, Congress was considering a subject "on which legislation could be had or would be materially aided by the information which the investigation was calculated to elicit".

=== Statutes ===
The "necessary and proper" clause of the Constitution also allows Congress to enact laws that mandate oversight by its committees, grant relevant authority to itself and its support agencies, and impose specific obligations on the executive to report to or consult with Congress, and even seek its approval for specific actions.

Broad oversight mandates exist for the legislature in several significant statutes.

- The Legislative Reorganization Act of 1946 (P.L. 79-601), for the first time, explicitly called for "legislative oversight" in public law. It directed House and Senate standing committees "to exercise continuous watchfulness" over programs and agencies under their jurisdiction; authorized professional staff for them; and enhanced the powers of the Comptroller General, the head of Congress’s investigative and audit arm, the Government Accountability Office (GAO).
- The Legislative Reorganization Act of 1970 (P.L. 91-510) authorized each standing committee to "review and study, on a continuing basis, the application, administration and execution" of laws under its jurisdiction; increased the professional staff of committees; expanded the assistance provided by the Congressional Research Service; and strengthened the program evaluation responsibilities of GAO.
- The Congressional Budget Act of 1974 (P.L. 93-344) allowed committees to conduct program evaluation themselves or contract out for it; strengthened GAO’s role in acquiring fiscal, budgetary, and program-related information; and upgraded GAO’s review capabilities.

Besides these general powers, numerous statutes direct the executive to furnish information to or consult with Congress. For example, the Government Performance and Results Act of 1993 (P.L. 103-62) requires agencies to consult with Congress on their strategic plans and report annually on performance plans, goals, and results. In fact, more than 2,000 reports are submitted each year to Congress by federal departments, agencies, commissions, bureaus, and offices. Inspectors general (IGs), for instance, report their findings about waste, fraud, and abuse, and their recommendations for corrective action, periodically to the agency head and Congress. The IGs are also instructed to issue special reports concerning particularly serious problems immediately to the agency head, who transmits them unaltered to Congress within seven days. The Reports Consolidation Act of 2000 (P.L. 106-531), moreover, instructs the IGs to identify and describe their agencies' most serious management and performance challenges and briefly assess progress in addressing them. This new requirement is to be part of a larger effort by individual agencies to consolidate their numerous reports on financial and performance management matters into a single annual report. The aim is to enhance coordination and efficiency within the agencies; improve the quality of relevant information; and provide it in a more meaningful and useful format for Congress, the president, and the public.

In addition, Congress creates commissions and establishes task forces to study and make recommendations for select policy areas that can also involve examination of executive operations and organizations.

There is a long history behind executive reports to Congress. Indeed, one of the first laws of the First Congress—the 1789 Act to establish the Treasury Department (1 Stat. 66)—called upon the secretary and the treasurer to report directly to Congress on public expenditures and all accounts. The secretary was also required "to make report, and give information to either branch of the legislature...respecting all matters referred to him by the Senate or House of Representatives, or which shall appertain to his office." Separate from such reporting obligations, public employees may provide information to Congress on their own. In the early part of the 20th century, Congress enacted legislation to overturn a "gag" rule, issued by the president, that prohibited employees from communicating directly with Congress (5 U.S.C. 7211 (1994)). Other "whistleblower" statutes, which have been extended specifically to cover personnel in the intelligence community (P.L. 105-272), guarantee the right of government employees to petition or furnish information to Congress or a member.

House and Senate chamber rules also reinforce the oversight function. House and Senate rules, for instance, provide for "special oversight" or "comprehensive policy oversight", respectively, for specified committees over matters that relate to their authorizing jurisdiction. In addition, House rules direct each standing committee to require its subcommittees to conduct oversight or to establish an oversight subcommittee for this purpose. House rules also call for each committee to submit an oversight agenda, listing its prospective oversight topics for the ensuing Congress, to the House Committee on Government Reform, which compiles and prints the agendas.

The House Government Reform Committee and the Senate Governmental Affairs Committee, which have oversight jurisdiction over virtually the entire federal government, furthermore, are authorized to review and study the operation of government activities to determine their economy and efficiency and to submit recommendations based on GAO reports. In addition, House rules require that the findings and recommendations from the Government Reform Committee be considered by authorizing panels, if presented to them in a timely fashion.

== Activities and avenues ==
Congressional oversight involves many different activities. The most highly publicized are rare select committee investigations into major scandals or executive branch failures.

Cases in point are temporary select committee inquiries into: China’s acquisition of U.S. nuclear weapons information, in 1999; the Iran–Contra affair, in 1987; intelligence agency abuses, in 1975–1976, and the Watergate scandal in 1973–1974. The precedent for this kind of oversight goes back two centuries: in 1792, a special House committee investigated the defeat of an Army force by confederated Indian tribes.

By comparison to these select panel investigations, other congressional inquiries in recent Congresses—into the Whitewater controversy, access to Federal Bureau of Investigation files, White House Travel Office firings, and campaign financing—have relied upon standing committees.

The impeachment proceedings against President Bill Clinton in 1998 in the House and in 1999 in the Senate also generated considerable oversight. The oversight not only encompassed the president and the White House staff, but also extended to the office of independent counsel, specifically its authority, jurisdiction, and expenditures. Although such highly visible endeavors are significant, they usually reflect only a small portion of Congress’s total oversight effort. More routine and regular review, monitoring, and supervision occur in other congressional activities and contexts. Especially important are appropriations hearings on agency budgets as well as authorization hearings for existing programs. Separately, examinations of executive operations and the implementation of programs—by congressional staff, support agencies, and specially created commissions and task forces—provide additional oversight.

Another avenue of oversight is a resolution of inquiry, which is a simple resolution making a direct request or demand of the president or the head of an executive department to furnish the House of Representatives with specific factual information in the administration’s possession.

== Congressional oversight training ==
The CRS and the Project On Government Oversight, an independent nonprofit watchdog, train congressional staff how to conduct effective oversight.

== See also ==
- Government Accountability Office (GAO) – assists congressional oversight by monitoring the executive branch and reporting to Congress.
- Congressional oversight hearings
