= United States Senate Committee on Patents =

The United States Senate Committee on Patents was a committee of the United States Senate. It was established September 7, 1837, as the "Committee on Patents and the Patent Office" when the Senate approved a resolution of Henry Hubbard of Kentucky. Prior to this, legislation and other matters relating to patents and the Patent Office were referred to the United States Senate Committee on the Judiciary.

== History ==
In 1869, the name of the committee was shortened to simply the Committee on Patents, which it remained until the committee was eliminated by the provisions of the Legislative Reorganization Act of 1946. Beginning January 2, 1947, jurisdiction over patents, the Patent Office, and patent law reverted to the United States Senate Judiciary Subcommittee on Patents, Copyrights, and Trademarks.

The comparable committee in the United States House of Representatives was also called the Committee on Patents.

== Chairmen and members ==
- 1837–1838: John Ruggles (D-ME)
- 1838–1840: Robert Strange (D-NC)
- 1840–1841: Daniel Sturgeon (D-PA)
- 1841–1842: Samuel Prentiss (W-VT)
- 1842–1843: John Leeds Kerr (W-MD)
  - Members: Augustus S. Porter (W-MI), John B. Henderson (W-MS), Leonard Wilcox (D-NH), Daniel Sturgeon (D-PA)
- 1843–1845: Samuel S. Phelps (W-VT)
- 1845–1846: Simon Cameron (D-PA)
- 1846–1847: Walter Colquitt (D-GA)
- 1847–1849: James D. Westcott (D-FL)
- 1849–1851: Hopkins Turney (D-TN)
- 1851–1852: Moses Norris Jr. (D-NH)
- 1852–1857: Charles Tillinghast James (D-RI)
- 1857–1859: David S. Reid (D-NC)
- 1859–1861: William Bigler (D-PA)
- 1861–1862: James F. Simmons (R-RI)
- 1862–1866: Edgar Cowan (R-PA)
- 1866–1871: Waitman Willey (R-WV)
- 1871–1875: Orris S. Ferry (R/LR/R-CT)
- 1875–1877: Bainbridge Wadleigh (R-NH)
  - Members: Newton Booth (AM-CA), Jerome B. Chaffee (R-CO), John W. Johnston (D-VA), Francis Kernan (D-NY)
- 1877–1879: Newton Booth (R-CA)
- 1879–1881: Francis Kernan (D-NY)
- 1881–1887: Orville H. Platt (R-CT)
- 1887–1889: Henry M. Teller (R-CO)
- 1889–1891: Nathan F. Dixon III (R-RI)
- 1891–1893: George Gray (D-DE)
- 1893–1899: Orville H. Platt (R-CT)
- 1899–1903: Jeter Pritchard (R-NC)
- 1903–1907: Alfred Kittredge (R-SD)
- 1907–1909: Reed Smoot (R-UT)
- 1909–1913: Norris Brown (R-NE)
- 1913–1918: Ollie M. James (D-KY)
- 1918–1919: William F. Kirby (D-AR)
- 1919–1921: George Norris (R-NE)
- 1921–1923: Hiram W. Johnson (R-CA)
- 1923–1925: Richard P. Ernst (R-KY)
- 1925–1926: William M. Butler (R-MA)
- 1926: Richard P. Ernst (R-KY)
- 1926–1929: Jesse H. Metcalf (R-RI)
- 1929–1932: Charles W. Waterman (R-CO);
  - Members: George W. Norris (R-NE), Ellison D. Smith (D-SC), Phillips Lee Goldsborough (R-MD), Edwin S. Broussard (D-LA), Felix Hebert (R-RI), Clarence Dill (D-WA)
- 1932–1933: Felix Hebert (R-RI)
- 1933: Robert F. Wagner (D-NY)
- 1934–1938: William Gibbs McAdoo (D-CA)
- 1939–1944: Homer T. Bone (D-WA)
- 1944–1947: Claude Pepper (D-FL)
