= United States Senate Committee on the Pacific Railroad =

The Senate Committee on the Pacific Railroad is a defunct committee of the United States Senate. It was first established as a select committee on July 7, 1861, to examine legislation to authorize construction of a transcontinental railroad.

This legislation formed the basis of the Pacific Railway Acts enacted in 1862, which granted a charter to the Union Pacific Railroad Company to construct the first transcontinental railroad in the United States and to provide federal support in the form of land grants and bond subsidies. The committee was made a standing committee on December 22, 1863 during the 38th United States Congress to oversee matters related to construction of the railroad. After construction was completed in 1869, the committee decreased in relevance and in 1873 when it was replaced by the Committee on Railroads.

== Original Members, 38th Congress ==
The standing committee consisted of nine members, each of whom were appointed to the committee on January 6, 1864. The committee's first chairman was Jacob Howard, a Republican from Michigan.

Member	State	Party
Jacob Howard, Chairman	Michigan	Republican
Jacob Collamer	Vermont	Republican
Reverdy Johnson	Maryland	Union
James Harlan	Iowa	Republican
Lyman Trumbull	Illinois	Republican
John Sherman	Ohio	Republican
Edwin D. Morgan	New York	Republican
John Conness	California	Republican
Gratz Brown	Missouri	Union Emancipation

== Chairmen (1863-1873) ==
- Jacob Howard, R-Michigan, 1863–1871
- William Stewart, R-Nevada, 1871–1873

== References and sources ==
- Chairmen of Senate Standing Committees 1789 – present, United States Senate Historical Office, November 2006
