= United States House Committee on Roads and Canals =

The United States House Committee on Roads and Canals was a U.S. House committee, which was initially established as a select committee in 1815 and subsequently became a standing committee between 1831 and 1869. Roads and canals were an initial and integral sector of domestic improvements for transportation. Previously from 1795 to 1815, federal government support for internal improvements was under the jurisdiction of the Committee on Commerce and Manufactures. Considered closely related to increasing the value of domestic commerce and funded by protective tariffs on it, the general subject of internal improvements was one of the most contentious issues in the young republic, despite the near-universal acceptance of the need for such development.

As technical advances were made and competing modes of transportation developed, the government's consensus and perspectives of them also changed. The committee was renamed the Committee on Railways and Canals between 1869 and 1927, but over this period the committee's authorized jurisdiction contracted significantly. In 1880, responsibility for many railroad related matters and the improvement of navigation of rivers were moved back to the renamed Committee on Commerce. In 1883 however, the new Committee on Rivers and Harbors was given jurisdiction over subjects including canals, which were related to the improvements of rivers and harbors, as well as the responsibility of reporting the river and harbor bills. The Committee on Railways and Canals was dissolved in 1927 with its remaining issues and jurisdiction being added to those of the Committee on Interstate and Foreign Commerce, which was later renamed the United States House Committee on Energy and Commerce in 1981.
