= United States Senate Committee on Forest Reservations and the Protection of Game =

Defunct committee of the United States Senate

The Senate Committee on Forest Reservations and the Protection of Game is a defunct committee of the United States Senate. It was established on March 19, 1896, and was terminated April 18, 1921, when its functions were transferred to the Committee on Agriculture and Forestry. The committee had overlapping jurisdiction with forestry policy handled by the agriculture committee, and outlived its usefulness during its later years.

The committee was preceded by two select committees, the Select Committee on Forest Reservations in California, which existed from July 28, 1892, to March 15, 1893, and the Select Committee on Forest Reservations which operated until March 19, 1896.

== See also ==
- National Park Service
