= United States Congressional Joint Committee on Postage on Second-Class Mail Matter and Compensation for Transportation of Mail =

The Committee on Postage on Second-Class Mail Matter and Compensation for Transportation of Mail was a joint committee of the United States Congress that existed from 1912 to 1915.

== History ==
The committee was established on August 24, 1912, during the 62nd Congress, and was extended twice on March 4, 1913 and again March 9, 1914. The extensions were necessary because the committee had been unable both times to complete its study prior to the reporting deadline established by Congress. The committee expired on March 3, 1915 at the end of the 63rd Congress.

== Jurisdiction ==
The Act of August 24, 1912, establishing the joint committee required the creation of a 6-member committee, consisting of three senators and three representatives. Membership was to come from the Senate Committee on Post Offices and Post Roads and the House Committee on the Post Office and Post Roads. The committee was ordered to "make inquiry into the subject of postage on second-class mail matter and compensation for the transportation of mail and to report at the earliest practicable date."

When the committee was unable to complete its task before the end of the 62nd Congress, it was reauthorized to sit for the 63rd Congress. The act extending the committees authority was adopted March 4, 1913, and stated that "personnel of the membership of the committees and commissions . . . shall continue with the same authorities, powers, and provisions for expenses until final report is made to Congress." The Act also stipulated a date for that final report, which was due March 4, 1914.

When the committee again failed to meet the statutory deadline, the committee was extended a third and final time on March 9, 1914, with a final report now due December 1 of that year. An interim report outlining the committees progress was presented by Chairman Jonathan Bourne, Jr. on August 31, 1914.

== Members ==
The committee consisted of three members of the United States Senate and three members of the United States House of Representatives. It was chaired by Jonathan Bourne of Oregon, who also served as the chairman of the Senate Committee on Post Office and Post Roads.

One unique aspect of the committee is that two of its members, Chairman Bourne and Harry A. Richardson of Delaware continued serving even after their terms as senators had ended. The committee had its authority extended in 1913 and 1914. Through an act dates March 4, 1913, the committee was reauthorized along with a provision that continued "the personnel of the joint committee with the same duties, powers, etc., as conferred by the act of August 24, 1912." This provision was enacted so Congress would not be deprived of the services and the benefit of the study given to the subject by the former senators, even though their terms of office expired on March 3, 1913. Both continued serving on the committee on their previous capacities, without compensation and paying, until the committee expired in December 1914.

| | Majority | Minority |
|---|---|---|
| Senate members | Jonathan Bourne, Jr., Oregon, Chairman; Harry A. Richardson, Delaware | John H. Bankhead, Alabama |
| House members | James T. Lloyd, Missouri; William E. Tuttle, Jr., New Jersey | John W. Weeks, Massachusetts |
