= United States Senate Committee on Public Health and National Quarantine =

Originally established December 4, 1878 as the Select Committee on Epidemic Diseases. It became a standing committee on December 12, 1887 until March 19, 1896, when the name was changed to the Committee on Public Health and National Quarantine. Terminated April 18, 1921.

== Chairmen ==
=== Select Committee on Epidemic Diseases 1878-1887 ===
- Isham Harris (D-TN) 1878-1887

=== Committee on Epidemic Diseases 1887-1896 ===
- Isham Harris (D-TN) 1887-1893
- John P. Jones (R-NV) 1893-1895

=== Committee on Public Health and National Quarantine 1896-1921 ===
- George G. Vest (D-MO) 1896-1903
- John T. Morgan (D-AL) 1903-1907
- John W. Daniel (D-VA) 1908-1909
- Thomas S. Martin (D-VA) 1909-1911
- Charles A. Culberson (D-TX) 1911-1913
- Joseph E. Ransdell (D-LA) 1913-1919
- Joseph I. France (R-MD) 1919-1921
