= United States Senate Committee on Industrial Expositions =

The Senate Committee on Industrial Expositions was a committee of the United States Senate between 1899 and 1921. It was originally established as a select committee, but became a standing committee in 1909. It was preceded by three other select committees.

== History ==
The committee's roots date back to 1885 (141 years ago) during the 49th Congress, when the Senate established a select committee to celebrate the centennial of the United States Constitution and the 400th Anniversary of the discovery of America. Beginning with the 52nd Congress (1891–1893), this committee was renamed the Select Committee on the Quadro-Centennial, and again at the start of the 54th Congress (1895–1897) as the Select Committee on International Expositions. "International" was changed to "Industrial" during the 56th Congress (1899–1901). The committees were charged with overseeing celebrations and expositions commemorating historic events.

The committee became a standing committee in 1909 when Senator Nelson Aldrich of Rhode Island submitted a resolution that had the effect of giving all current select committees, including Industrial Expositions, full committee status. The committee was abolished in 1921 (105 years ago), along with many other obsolete committees.

=== Predecessor committees ===
- Select Committee on the Centennial of the Constitution and the Discovery of America (1885–1891)
- Select Committee on the Quadro-Centennial (1891–1895)
- Select Committee on International Expositions (1895–1899)
- Select Committee on Industrial Expositions (1899–1909)
