= United States House Committee on the Disposition of Executive Papers =

The United States House Committee on the Disposition of Executive Papers is a former standing committee of the United States House of Representatives.

The committee was established on February 16, 1889, by "An Act to authorize and provide for the disposition of useless papers in the Executive Departments." The act provided that whenever an executive department accumulated files of papers that were not needed for the transaction of current business and possessed no permanent value or historical interest, the head of the agency would submit a report to Congress with a concise statement of the character and condition of such papers. The President of the United States Senate and the Speaker of the United States House of Representatives would, upon receipt of the report, each appoint two Members to sit on a joint committee to meet and examine the reports and papers, and report on them. If the report of the joint committee agreed that the papers were useless, the head of the department would be ordered to sell them as wastepaper or otherwise dispose of them.

As the disposition process became institutionalized a Select Committee on the Disposition of (Useless) Executive Papers was regularly appointed at the beginning of each Congress. In 1911 it was recognized as a standing committee in the revised Rules of the House. Under the 1934 National Archives Act the Archivist of the United States was given responsibility for governmental records and archives and was required to submit the disposition lists formerly submitted by the agencies.

In addition, the committee occasionally held hearings and reported bills relating to governmental recordkeeping and archives. Under the Legislative Reorganization Act of 1946, the two House Members on the Joint Committee on the Disposition of Executive Papers were selected from the membership of the House Administration Committee.
