= United States House Committee on Ventilation and Acoustics =

Former US House of Representatives committee

The United States House Committee on Ventilation and Acoustics is a former standing committee of the United States House of Representatives.

The committee was established to have jurisdiction over subjects related to the ventilation and acoustics of the Hall of the House of Representatives. The ventilation and acoustics of the House Chamber had been known to be unsatisfactory from 1857 when the chamber was first occupied. Before the establishment of the standing committee, numerous select committees were named to study the problem and suggest solutions. In 1911 the committee was abolished and the subjects in its jurisdiction were included in the jurisdiction of the Committee on Accounts.

== Chairmen ==
Representative	Party	State	Years	Congress
George Washington Shell	Democrat	South Carolina	1893–1895	53rd
William S. Linton	Republican	Michigan	1895–1897	54th
Joel Prescott Heatwole	Republican	Minnesota	1897–1899	55th
George Washington Prince	Republican	Illinois	1899–1901	56th
Roswell P. Bishop	Republican	Michigan	1901–1907	57th, 58th and 59th
William H. Graham	Republican	Pennsylvania	1907–1909	60th
George D. McCreary	Republican	Pennsylvania	1909–1911	61st
