= United States Senate Committee on the Census =

Committee in the United States Senate

The United States Senate Select Committee on the Tenth Census was created in 1878. It continued to operate until 1887, when it became the United States Senate Committee on the Census. It was abolished in 1921. Issues related to the U.S. Census and the U.S. Census Bureau are now under the jurisdiction of the Senate Committee on Homeland Security and Governmental Affairs.

The Committee conducted hearings to examine the census and a permanent census service.

== Chairmen of the Select Committee on the Tenth Census, 1878–1887 ==
- Justin S. Morrill (R-VT) 1878–1879
- George H. Pendleton (D-OH) 1879–1881
- Eugene Hale (R-ME) 1881–1887

== Chairmen of the Committee on the Census, 1887–1921 ==
- Eugene Hale (R-ME) 1887–1893
- David Turpie (D-IN) 1893–1895
- William Chandler (R-NH) 1895–1897
- Thomas H. Carter (R-MT) 1897–1901
- Joseph V. Quarles (R-WI) 1901–1905
- Chester Long (R-KS) 1905–1909
- Robert M. La Follette (R-WI) 1909–1913
- William E. Chilton (D-WV) 1913–1916
- Morris Sheppard (D-TX) 1916–1919
- Howard Sutherland (R-WV) 1919–1921
