= United States House Select Committee on Alleged Abstraction of Books from the Library of the House =

The Committee on Alleged Abstraction of Books from the Library of the House was a select committee of the United States House of Representatives that existed from February 14–28, 1861.

The committee was charged with investigating rumors that several members of the House of Representatives from several states that had seceded from the United States had taken books from the House Library for personal use, or, alternatively, to help start a congressional library for the Confederate States of America. The allegations were first made public by The New York Times in an article published February 13, 1861, that accused Members of Congress of taking "some of the most valuable volumes in the collection.

The select committee's investigation determined those rumors to be in error, finding that the supposed missing books had instead not been properly credited back to the representatives' accounts after being returned.

== Members ==
Members	Party	State
Roger A. Pryor, Chairman	Democratic	Virginia
Horace Maynard	Independent	Tennessee
Thomas M. Edwards	Republican	New Hampshire
