= United States Congressional Joint Committee on the Ford's Theater Disaster =

United States Congressional committee

The Committee on the Ford's Theater Disaster was a joint committee of the United States Congress that existed from August 18, 1894, to February 25, 1897. It was preceded by the Senate Select Committee on the Ford Theater Disaster. The committee investigated injury claims from victims of the 1893 collapse of Ford's Theatre in Washington, D.C.

== History ==
On June 9, 1893, while 490 clerks of the Record and Pension Division of the War Department were working at their offices in the Ford's Theater building, workmen in the basement were removing portions of the building's foundation. A large section of the three interior floors collapsed. Eighteen employees were killed immediately and four more died later. Sixty-eight others were injured.

On December 14, 1893, the United States Senate established a select committee to investigate the disaster and report whether the government should compensate the victims. On August 18, 1894, Congress approved the sundry civil appropriations bill, which created a joint committee of the existing Senate select committee and five members of the U.S. House of Representatives. The committee was directed to investigate the disaster and report to the two Houses "whether in equity and justice the government should compensate the sufferers of that disaster for the injuries sustained by them." If such compensation seemed appropriate, the Act required the committee to investigate each case to determine the amount that should be paid.

Upon investigation, the committee unanimously concluded that compensation should be made "by reason of the fact that in the contract for removing the underpinning of said building no provision whatever for shoring up the building during the excavation was made, and the fact that no provision was made for expert superintendence, the building at the time containing about 500 Government clerks."

The committee proceeded to consider individual claims of death or injury due to the disaster, taking testimony and affidavits from claimants and witnesses. The committee referred all claims for permanent injury to a medical board. An abstract of each case was appended to a committee report of May 11, 1896. The committee completed its task on February 25, 1897, with the issuance of its final report, including synopses and recommendations on three new cases and some reconsidered claims.
