= United States House Committee on Mileage =

The United States House Committee on Mileage is a former standing committee of the United States House of Representatives.

The jurisdiction of the committee is described in Rule XI: "The ascertaining of the travel of Members of the House shall be made by the Committee on Mileage and reported to the Sergeant at Arms." The committee was an outgrowth of the Committee on Accounts which originally was charged with the audit of Members' mileage.

In 1927 the Committee on Mileage was discontinued and these duties were returned to the Accounts Committee.

In addition to determining the travel expenses of Members, the committee reported on bills, resolutions, and petitions and memorials related to this subject.
