= United States House Committee on Revolutionary Pensions =

Defunct U.S. House of Representatives committee

The United States House Committee on Revolutionary Pensions was a U.S. House committee, established on January 10, 1831, that superseded the defunct Committee on Military Pensions to assume jurisdiction over issues related to pensions for service in the American Revolutionary War.

In 1867, the committee assumed the role of administering to pension issues related to the War of 1812 to reduce the workload of the Committee on Invalid Pensions. The committee on Revolutionary Pensions was subsequently dissolved in 1880 following the creation of the Committee on Pensions.
