= United States House Committee on Rivers and Harbors =

The House Committee on Rivers and Harbors was a U.S. House committee from 1883 until 1946. It was authorized early in the 48th Congress in December 1883, when the committee was given jurisdiction over subjects relating to the improvements of rivers and harbors; it also had the responsibility of reporting the river and harbor bills to the floor. These functions previously had been handled by the Committee on Commerce.

The committee's jurisdiction changed over time with many additional considerations and jurisdictions and some reductions. The Rivers and Harbors committee, as well as other committees related to public works were terminated by the Legislative Reorganization Act of 1946, with their successor being House Committee on Public Works, and currently the Committee on Transportation and Infrastructure.

== History and jurisdiction ==
With the establishment of the Committee on Rivers and Harbors on December 19, 1883, the Committee on Commerce relinquished its previous jurisdiction over appropriations for the improvement of rivers and harbors. Federal internal improvements for harbors date from 1792 with the Cape Henry Light, and for rivers from 1824. The latter beginning for rivers followed the landmark decision of the US Supreme Court granting Congress the power to regulate interstate navigation under the Commerce Clause in Gibbons v. Ogden; the work was initiated through the General Survey Act and the first rivers and harbors legislation passed shortly thereafter. While the issue of federally funded improvements was still contentious, it was generally less so by the time the committee was formed.
