= Legislative Reorganization Act of 1970 =

- Long title: An Act to improve the operation of the legislative branch of the Federal Government, and for other purposes.
- Enacted by: the 91st United States Congress

Citations
- Public law: Pub. L. 91-510
- Statutes at Large: 84 Stat. 1140

Legislative history
- Introduced in the House as H.R. 17654 by William M. Colmer on May 18, 1970; Signed into law by President Richard Nixon on October 26, 1970

The Legislative Reorganization Act of 1970 (Pub. L. 91–510) was an act of the United States Congress to "improve the operation of the legislative branch of the Federal Government, and for other purposes." The act focused mainly on the rules that governed congressional committee procedures, decreasing the power of the chair and empowering minority members, and on making House and Senate processes more transparent.

== Provisions ==
- Required that reports on a measure be made available three days before a floor vote.
- Established procedures for recorded votes in the House Committee of the Whole and led to the installation of electronic voting machines.
- Provided procedures to combat non-germane amendments in conference reports and compromises that exceeded the scope of the disagreement between House and Senate versions of the bill.
- Required that debate time on conference reports be equally divided between the two major parties.
- Allowed committees to meet while the Senate was in session, with approval of the majority and minority leaders.
- Expanded committee staffing, gave minority members greater say in staff selections, and required majority approval for hiring and firing committee staffers.
- Renamed the Legislative Reference Service as the Congressional Research Service, gave it greater autonomy from the Library of Congress, expanded the services that it provided, and directed it to triple its staff.
- Revised the executive oversight functions of standing committees, requiring committees to issue biennial reports.
- Authorized funding of computer technology in member offices.
- Authorized televising of open House committee hearings.
- Created the Joint Committee on Congressional Operations.

== History ==
The origins of the act can be traced back to the formation of the Joint Committee on the Organization of the Congress in March 1965. The committee held extensive hearings and issued its recommendations on July 28, 1966. These recommendations "formed the backbone" of the act.

On April 22, 1969, the House Rules Committee formed the Special Subcommittee on Legislative Reorganization. The chairman of the committee was B. F. Sisk (D-CA) and the other members were Ray J. Madden (D-IN), who was later replaced by John Young (D-TX), Richard Bolling (D-MO), H. Allen Smith (R-CA), and Delbert L. Latta (R-OH). The subcommittee held meetings over several months, creating a draft bill, held multiple briefings for House members, followed by hearings on the draft bill. After revisions to the draft bill, the subcommittee reported the bill to the full Rules Committee in early 1970. After further amendments, the committee reported the bill on May 12.

The full House began debate on the bill on July 13 and after amending it, passed the bill by a vote of 326–19 on September 17. The Senate took up the bill without referring it to committee, and passed the bill with amendments, by a vote of 59–5 on October 6. The House agreed to the Senate version by voice vote on October 8, and it was signed by President Nixon on October 26, 1970.

== See also ==
- Legislative Reorganization Act of 1946
