= Standing committee (United States Congress) =

Permanent legislative panel of the United States Congress

In the United States Congress, standing committees are permanent legislative panels established by the United States House of Representatives and United States Senate rules. (House Rule X, Senate Rule XXV.) Because they have legislative jurisdiction, standing committees consider bills and issues and recommend measures for consideration by their respective chambers. They also have oversight responsibility to monitor agencies, programs, and activities within their jurisdictions, and in some cases in areas that cut across committee jurisdictions. Due to their permanent nature, these committees exist beyond the adjournment of each two-year meeting of Congress.

Most standing committees recommend funding levels—authorizations—for government operations and for new and existing programs. A few have other functions. For example, the Appropriations Committees recommend legislation to provide budget authority for federal agencies and programs. The Budget Committees establish aggregate levels for total spending and revenue that serve as guidelines for the work of the authorizing and appropriating panels. Committees also provide oversight of federal agencies and programs.

The Legislative Reorganization Act of 1946 greatly reduced the number of committees. The membership of each committee is adopted at the beginning of each Congress, usually by adoption of a formal resolution. Each committee is assigned its own staff to assist with its legislative, investigative, and research functions. Several committees divide their work into sub units called subcommittees.

Committee sizes range from 6 to 50 members per committee. In the House, one person may not serve on more than two standing committees and four subcommittees at one time, though waivers can be granted to serve on additional committees. Also in the House, the House Republican Steering Committee assigns Republican representatives to their committee(s), while the Steering and Policy Committee is in charge of assigning Democratic representatives to committees. The Senate follows similar procedures, with senators being limited to no more than three full committees and five sub-committees.

== Current number of standing committees ==
As of June 20, 2020, the Senate had 16 standing committees, and the House had 20 standing committees. (The count is for standing committees only, and does not include select or special committees or joint committees. See those articles for that information.)

== See also ==
- List of United States House of Representatives committees
- List of United States Senate committees
- Select or special committee
- Standing committee
