= Legislative Reorganization Act of 1946 =

Reorganization of the US Congress

- Long title: To provide for increased efficiency in the legislative branch of the Government.
- Enacted by: the 79th United States Congress
- Effective: August 2, 1946; 80 years ago

Citations
- Public law: Pub. L. 79–601
- Statutes at Large: 60 Stat. 812 through 60 Stat. 852 (40 pages)

Legislative history
- Signed into law by President Harry S. Truman on August 2, 1946

The Legislative Reorganization Act of 1946 (also known as the Congressional Reorganization Act, ch. 753, 60 Stat. 812, enacted August 2, 1946) was the most comprehensive reorganization of the United States Congress in history to that date.

== Background ==
The need to modernize the national legislature became evident during the Great Depression of the 1930s and World War II. During those years of economic crisis and global war, the federal government took on vast new responsibilities—responsibilities that stretched to the breaking point of the capacity of the national legislature, as it was then structured, to cope with a vastly increased workload. At the same time the power and prestige of Congress were rapidly eroding. During the Depression, and even more so during the war, Congress delegated sweeping authority to the administration of Franklin D. Roosevelt to implement legislation as he and his agents in the executive branch saw fit. In addition, the war caused Congress a severe loss of prestige. Some influential commentators charged that Congress's antiquated traditions, cumbersome procedures, and long delays in considering legislation rendered it incapable of meeting the needs of the modern world. The future, they said, rested with the president.

== Overview ==
By the end of the war, many legislators had concluded that the only way to recapture their lost stature was to reform the Congress. A key leader of the reform movement was the veteran Wisconsin senator Robert M. La Follette Jr., scion of Wisconsin's famous political dynasty. In 1945, he and Oklahoma representative A. S. "Mike" Monroney co-chaired a joint committee of Congress to consider what might be done to make the body more efficient and effective. The following year, the committee recommended sweeping reforms, and the committee's co-chairs incorporated many of those reforms into a reorganization measure.

=== Provisions ===
The key provisions of the Act proposed streamlining Congress's cumbersome committee system by reducing the number of standing committees and carefully defining their jurisdictions; upgrading staff support for legislators; strengthening congressional oversight of executive agencies; and establishing an elaborate procedure to put congressional spending and taxation policies on a more rational basis. The bill also required lobbyists to register with Congress and to file periodic reports of their activities.

Under the Act the Committees on Public Buildings and Grounds (1837–1946), Rivers and Harbors (1883–1946), Roads (1913–46), and the Flood Control (1916–46) were combined to form the Committee on Public Works. Its jurisdiction from the beginning of the 80th Congress (1947–48) through the 90th Congress (1967–68) remained unchanged.

The Act also prohibited the practice of the Executive Branch detailing staff to committees for policy development. FDR had detailed several Executive Branch staff to key committees that were working on his legislative agenda. Congressional backlash to this tactic is one of the reasons the Act was passed.

== Results ==
The Act produced mixed results. Probably its greatest success was in equipping legislators and their committees with staffs of experts to help draft bills and analyze the complex issues that come before Congress. Legislative oversight of the executive branch also improved as a result of reorganization. In other areas reorganization fell short. The positive effects of reducing committee numbers was at least partly counterbalanced by the unexpected proliferation of subcommittees, which were not regulated in the act. Many lobbyists exploited loopholes in the act to avoid full compliance. The ambitious reform of the budget process failed to work and was abandoned after a couple of years. Above all, the act failed to achieve its major objective. It slowed but did not reverse the flow of power and prestige from the legislative branch to the executive branch.

== Regulation of Lobbying Act ==
Title III of the Act was the Regulation of Lobbying Act (60 Stat. 839), intended to reduce the influence of lobbyists and to provide information to members of Congress about those that lobby them. The Regulation of Lobbying Act was later repealed by the Lobbying Disclosure Act of 1995.

== Federal Tort Claims Act ==
Title IV of the Act was the Federal Tort Claims Act (60 Stat. 842), permitting private parties to sue the United States in a federal court for most torts committed by persons acting on behalf of the United States. Historically, citizens have not been able to sue their state—a doctrine referred to as sovereign immunity. The FTCA constitutes a limited waiver of sovereign immunity, permitting citizens to pursue some tort claims against the government.

== General Bridge Act ==
Title V of the Act was the General Bridge Act (60 Stat. 847), providing for the: "construction, maintenance, and operation of bridges and approaches thereto over the navigable waters of the United States" and repealed provisions of the Rivers and Harbors Act of 1899.

== See also ==
- Legislative Reorganization Act of 1970
- List of United States House of Representatives committees
- List of defunct United States congressional committees
