= 65th United States Congress =

1917-1919 U.S. Congress

←	64th	66th	→
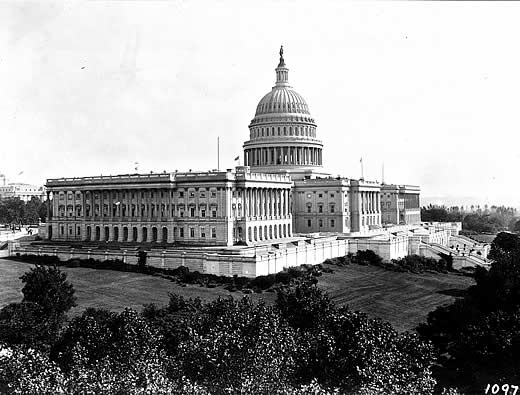
- United States Capitol (1906)

Overview
- Legislative body: United States Congress
- Jurisdiction: United States
- Term: March 4, 1917 – March 4, 1919

Senate
- Members: 96
- President: Thomas R. Marshall (D)
- President pro tempore: Willard Saulsbury Jr. (D)
- Party control: Democratic

House of Representatives
- Members: 435 representatives 5 non-voting delegates
- Speaker: Champ Clark (D)
- Party control: Coalition: Democratic Progressive Socialist

Sessions
- Special (Note: Special session of the Senate.): March 5, 1917 – March 16, 1917
- 1st: April 2, 1917 – October 6, 1917
- 2nd: December 3, 1917 – November 21, 1918
- 3rd: December 2, 1918 – March 3, 1919

The 65th United States Congress was a meeting of the legislative branch of the United States federal government, composed of the United States Senate and the United States House of Representatives. It met in Washington, D.C., from March 4, 1917, to March 4, 1919, during the fifth and sixth years of Woodrow Wilson's presidency. The apportionment of seats in this House of Representatives was based on the 1910 United States census.

The Senate maintained a Democratic majority. In the House, the Republicans had actually won a plurality, but as the Progressives and Socialist Representative Meyer London caucused with the Democrats, this gave them the operational majority of the nearly evenly divided chamber, thus giving the Democrats full control of Congress, and along with President Wilson maintaining an overall federal government trifecta.

== Major events ==
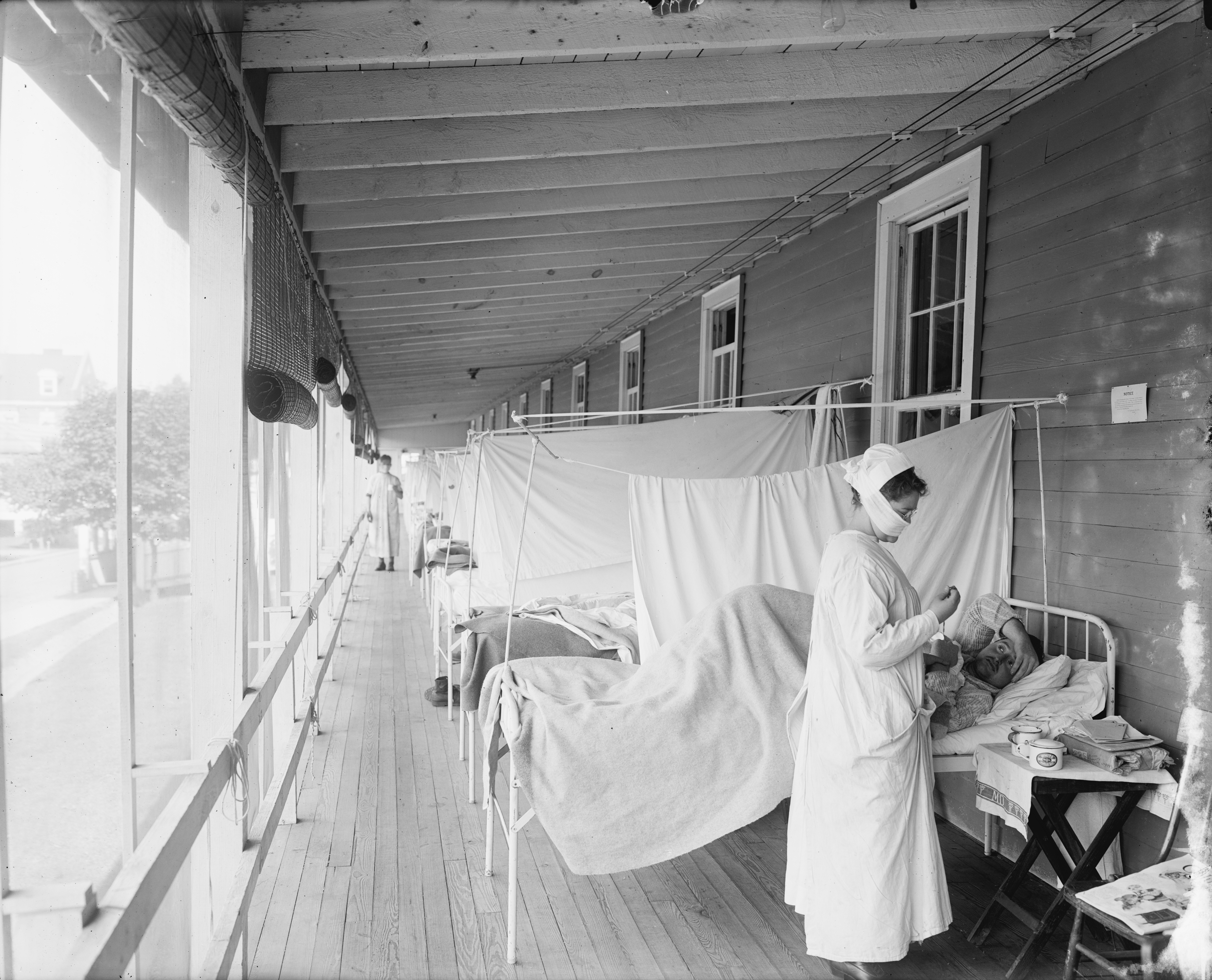
1918 flu pandemic

- March 4, 1917: Jeannette Rankin of Montana became the first woman member of the United States House of Representatives.
- March 8, 1917: The United States Senate adopted the cloture rule to limit filibusters.
- March 31, 1917: The United States takes possession of the Danish West Indies, which become the US Virgin Islands, after paying $25 million to Denmark.
- April 2, 1917: World War I: President Woodrow Wilson asks the U.S. Congress for a declaration of war on Germany.
- December 4, 1917: World War I: President Woodrow Wilson delivers the State of the Union Address and requests declaration of war on Austria-Hungary.
- March 4, 1918: A soldier at Camp Funston, Kansas, fell sick with the first confirmed case of the Spanish flu.
- November 11, 1918: World War I ends.

== Major legislation ==
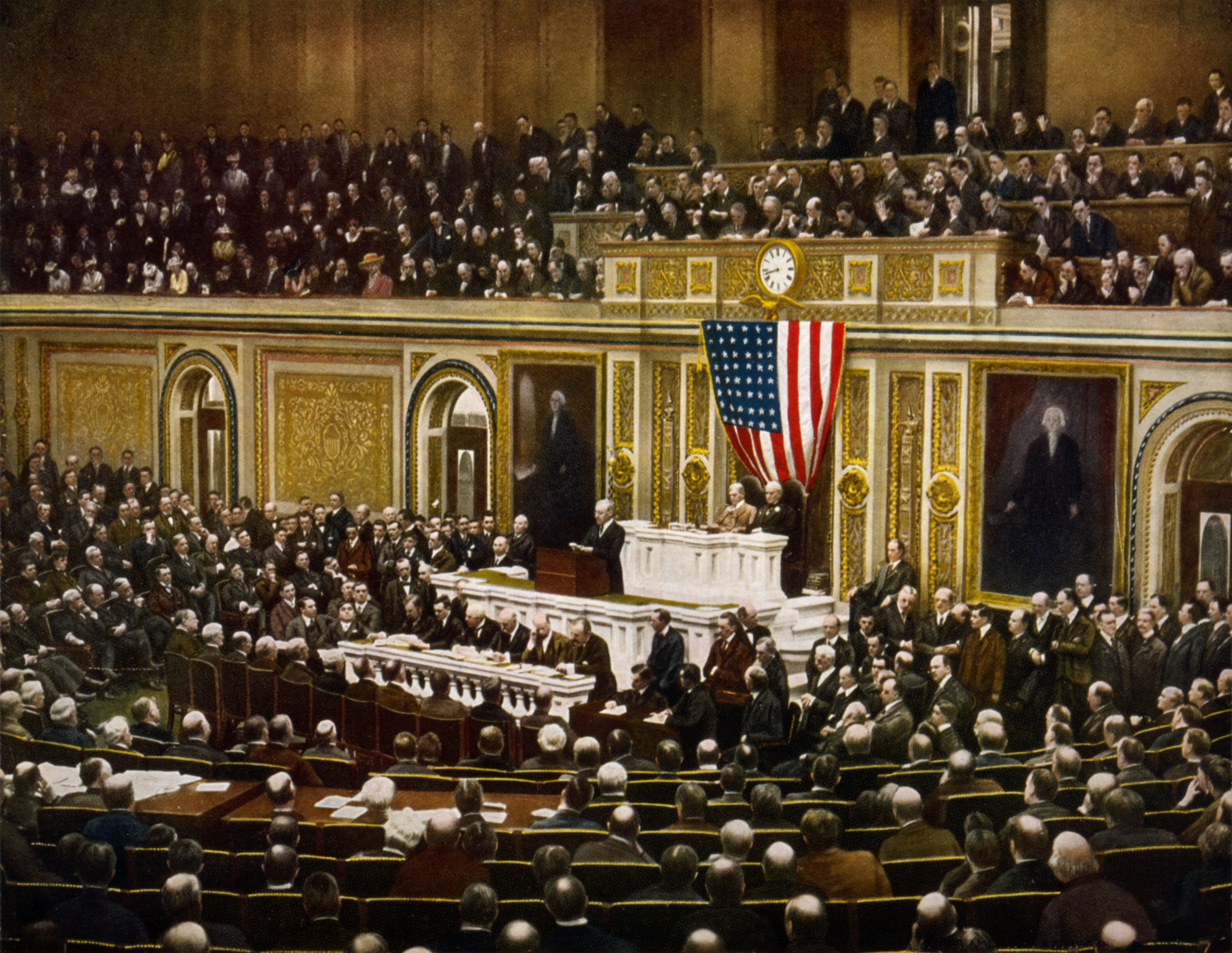
President Woodrow Wilson asking Congress to declare war on Germany on April 2, 1917.

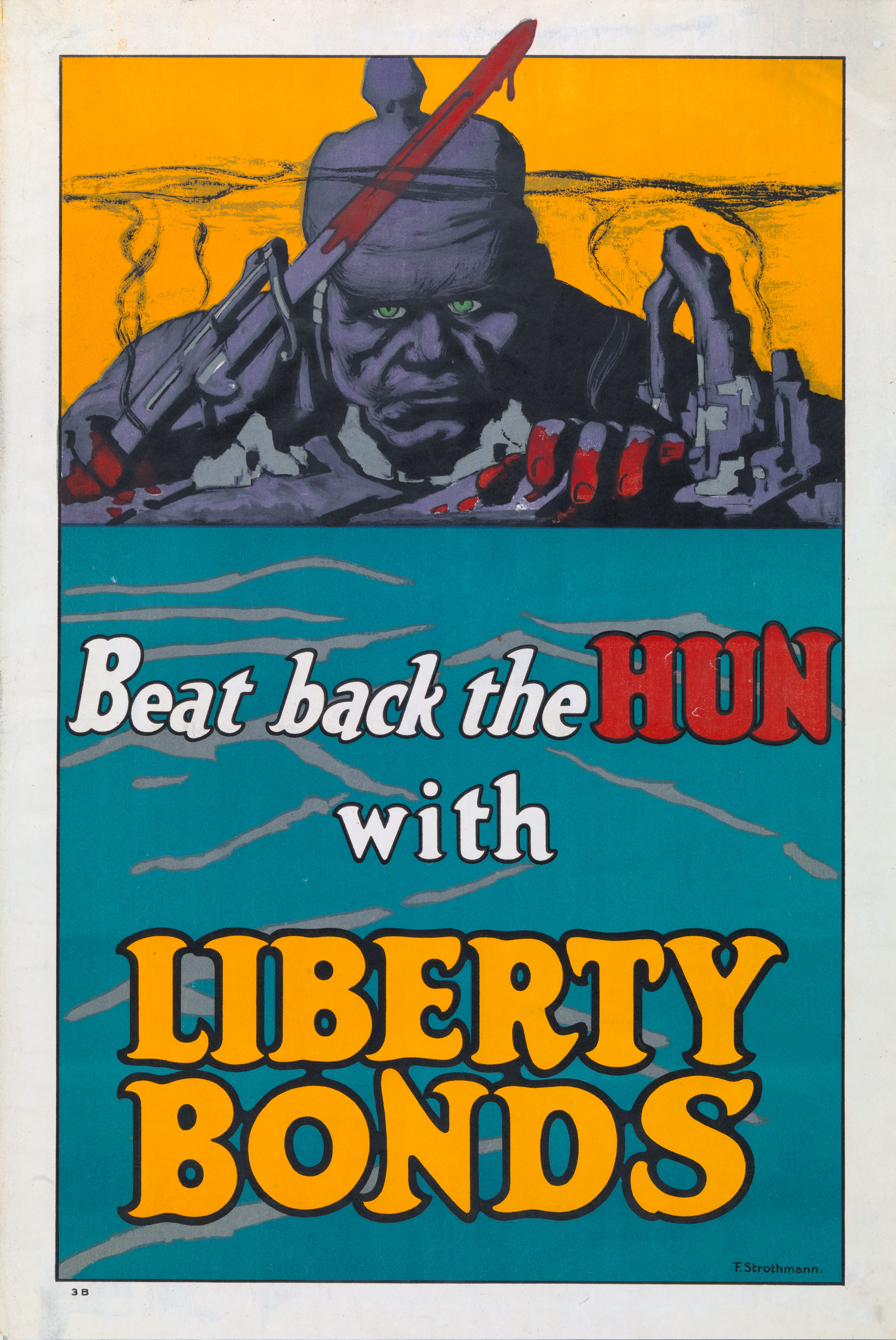
After war was declared, war bond posters demonized Germany

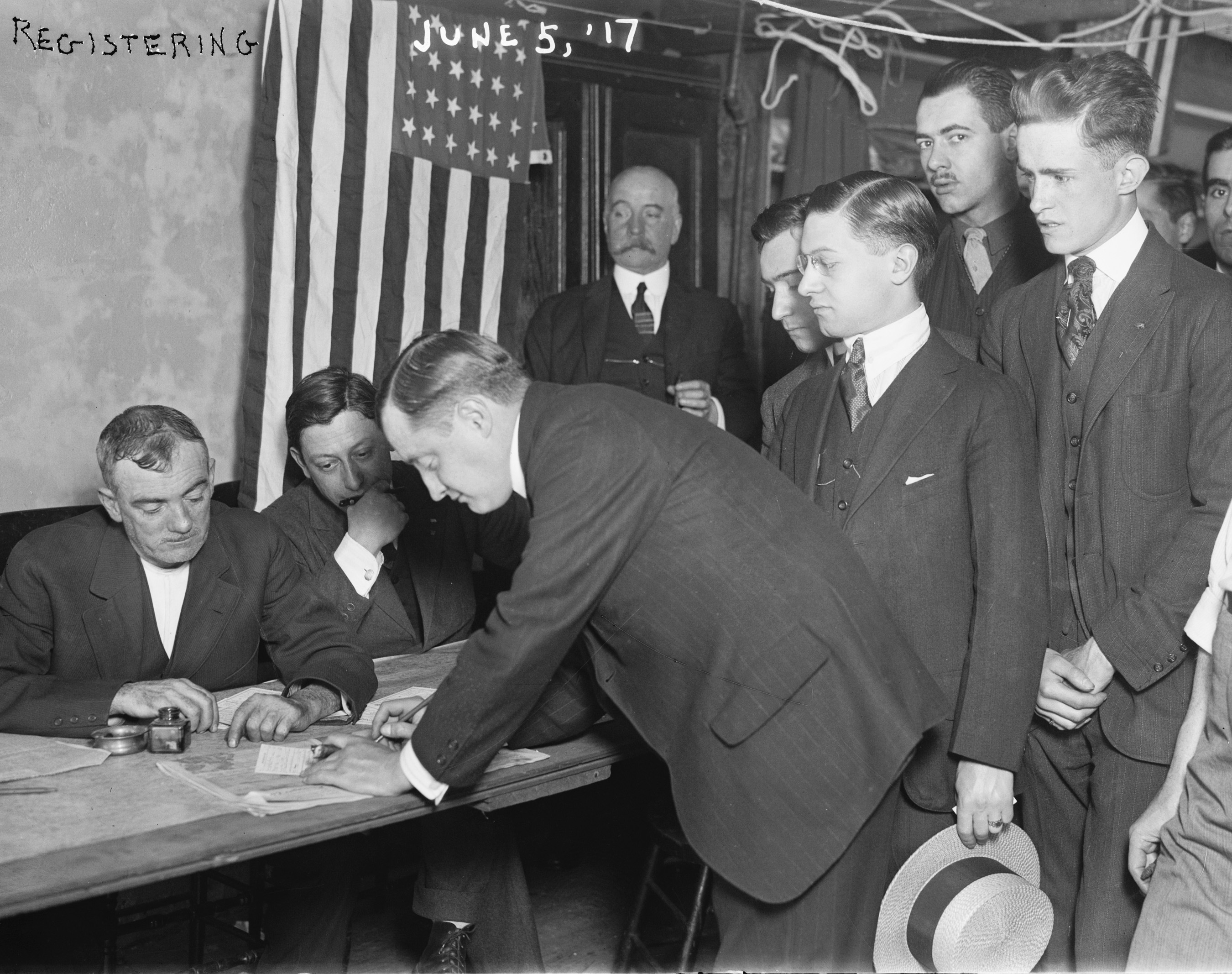
Young men at the first national registration day held in association with the Selective Service Act of 1917.

- April 6, 1917: Declaration of war against Germany, Sess. 1 ch. 1, 40 Stat. 1
- April 24, 1917: First Liberty Bond Act, Sess. 1, ch. 4, 40 Stat. 35
- May 12, 1917: Enemy Vessel Confiscation Joint Resolution, Pub. L. 65–2, 40 Stat. 75
- May 12, 1917: First Army Appropriations Act of 1917, 40 Stat. 69
- May 18, 1917: Selective Service Act of 1917, Sess. 1, ch. 15, 40 Stat. 76
- May 29, 1917: Esch Car Service Act of 1917, Sess. 1, ch. 23, 40 Stat. 101
- June 15, 1917: Emergency Shipping Fund Act of 1917, c. 29, 40 Stat. 182
- June 15, 1917: Second Army Appropriations Act of 1917, 40 Stat. 188
- June 15, 1917: Espionage Act of 1917, Sess. 1, ch. 30, 40 Stat. 217 (incl. title XI: Search Warrant Act of 1917)
- July 24, 1917: Aviation Act of 1917, ch. 40, 40 Stat. 243
- August 8, 1917: River and Harbor Act of 1917, Sess. 1, ch. 49, 40 Stat. 250
- August 10, 1917: Priority of Shipments Act of 1917 (Obstruction of Interstate Commerce Act of 1917), Sess. 1, ch. 51, 40 Stat. 272
- August 10, 1917: Food and Fuel Control Act (Lever Act), Sess. 1, ch. 53, 40 Stat. 27
- October 1, 1917: Second Liberty Bond Act, Sess. 1, ch. 56, 40 Stat. 288
- October 1, 1917: Aircraft Board Act of 1917, Sess. 1, ch. 61, 40 Stat. 296
- October 3, 1917: War Revenue Act of 1917, Sess. 1, ch. 63, 40 Stat. 300
- October 5, 1917: Repatriation Act of 1917, Sess. 1, ch. 68, 40 Stat. 340
- October 6, 1917: Federal Explosives Act of 1917, Sess. 1, ch. 83, 40 Stat. 385
- October 6, 1917: War Risk Insurance Act of 1917, Sess. 1, ch. 105, 40 Stat. 398
- October 6, 1917: International Emergency Economic Powers Act (Trading with the Enemy Act), Sess. 1, ch. 106, 40 Stat. 411
- December 7, 1917: Declaration of war against Austria–Hungary, Sess. 2, ch. 1, 40 Stat. 429
- February 24, 1918: Revenue Act of 1918, Sess. 2, ch. 18, 40 Stat. 1057
- March 8, 1918: Soldiers' and Sailors' Civil Relief Act, Sess. 2, ch. 20, 40 Stat. 440
- March 19, 1918: Standard Time Act of 1918 (Calder Act), Sess. 2, ch. 24, 40 Stat. 450
- March 21, 1918: Federal Control Act of 1918, Sess. 2, ch. 25, 40 Stat. 451
- April 4, 1918: Third Liberty Bond Act, Sess. 2, ch. 44, 40 Stat. 502
- April 5, 1918: War Finance Corporation Act, Sess. 2, ch. 45, 40 Stat. 506
- April 10, 1918: Webb–Pomerene Act, Sess. 2, ch. 50, 40 Stat. 516
- April 18, 1918: American Forces Abroad Indemnity Act, Sess. 2, ch. 57, 40 Stat. 532
- April 20, 1918: Destruction of War Materials Act, Sess. 2, ch. 59, 40 Stat. 533
- April 23, 1918: Pittman Act, Sess. 2, ch. 63, 40 Stat. 535
- May 9, 1918: Alien Naturalization Act, Sess. 2, ch. 69, 40 Stat. 542
- May 16, 1918: Housing Act, Sess. 2, ch. 74, 40 Stat. 550
- May 16, 1918: Sedition Act of 1918, Sess. 2, ch. 75, 40 Stat. 553
- May 20, 1918: Departmental Reorganization Act (Overman Act), Sess. 2, ch. 78, 40 Stat. 556
- May 22, 1918: Wartime Measure Act of 1918, Sess. 2, ch. 81, 40 Stat. 559
- May 31, 1918: Saulsbury Resolution, Sess. 2, ch. 90, 40 Stat. 593
- June 27, 1918: Veterans Rehabilitation Act (Smith–Sears Act), Sess. 2, ch. 107, 40 Stat. 617
- July 3, 1918: Migratory Bird Treaty Act of 1918, Sess. 2, ch. 128, 40 Stat. 755
- July 9, 1918: Fourth Liberty Bond Act, Sess. 2, ch. 142, 40 Stat. 844
- July 9, 1918: Army Appropriations Act of 1918, Sess. 2, ch. 143, 40 Stat. 845 (incl. ch. 15: Public Health and Research Act of 1918 (Chamberlain–Kahn Act))
- July 18, 1918: River and Harbor Act of 1918, Sess. 2, ch. 155, 40 Stat. 904
- July 18, 1918: Charter Rate and Requisition Act of 1918, Sess. 2, ch. 157, 40 Stat. 913
- October 16, 1918: Immigration Act of 1918 (Dillingham–Hardwick Act), Sess. 2, ch. 186, 40 Stat. 1012
- October 16, 1918: Corrupt Practices Act of 1918 (Gerry Act), Sess. 2, ch. 187, 40 Stat. 1013
- November 7, 1918: National Bank Consolidation Act of 1918, Sess. 2, ch. 209, 40 Stat. 1043
- November 21, 1918: Food Production Stimulation Act (War–Time Prohibition Act), Sess. 2, ch. 212, 40 Stat. 1045
- February 24, 1919: Child Labor Act of 1919, Sess. 3, ch. 18, 40 Stat. 1138
- February 26, 1919: Grand Canyon National Park Act of 1919, Sess. 3, ch. 44, 40 Stat. 1178
- February 26, 1919: Acadia National Park Act of 1919, Sess. 3, ch. 45, 40 Stat. 1178
- March 2, 1919: War Risk Insurance Act of 1919 (War Minerals Relief Act of 1919, Dent Act), Sess. 3, ch. 94, 40 Stat. 1272
- March 2, 1919: River and Harbors Act of 1919, Sess. 3, ch. 95, 40 Stat. 1275
- March 3, 1919: Hospitalization Act of 1919, Sess. 3, ch. 98, 40 Stat. 1302
- March 3, 1919: Fifth Liberty Bond Act, Sess. 3, ch. 100, 40 Stat. 1309
- March 4, 1919: Wheat Price Guarantee Act, Sess. 3, ch. 125, 40 Stat. 1348

== Major resolutions ==
- April 3, 1918 American's Creed (House)

== Constitutional amendments ==
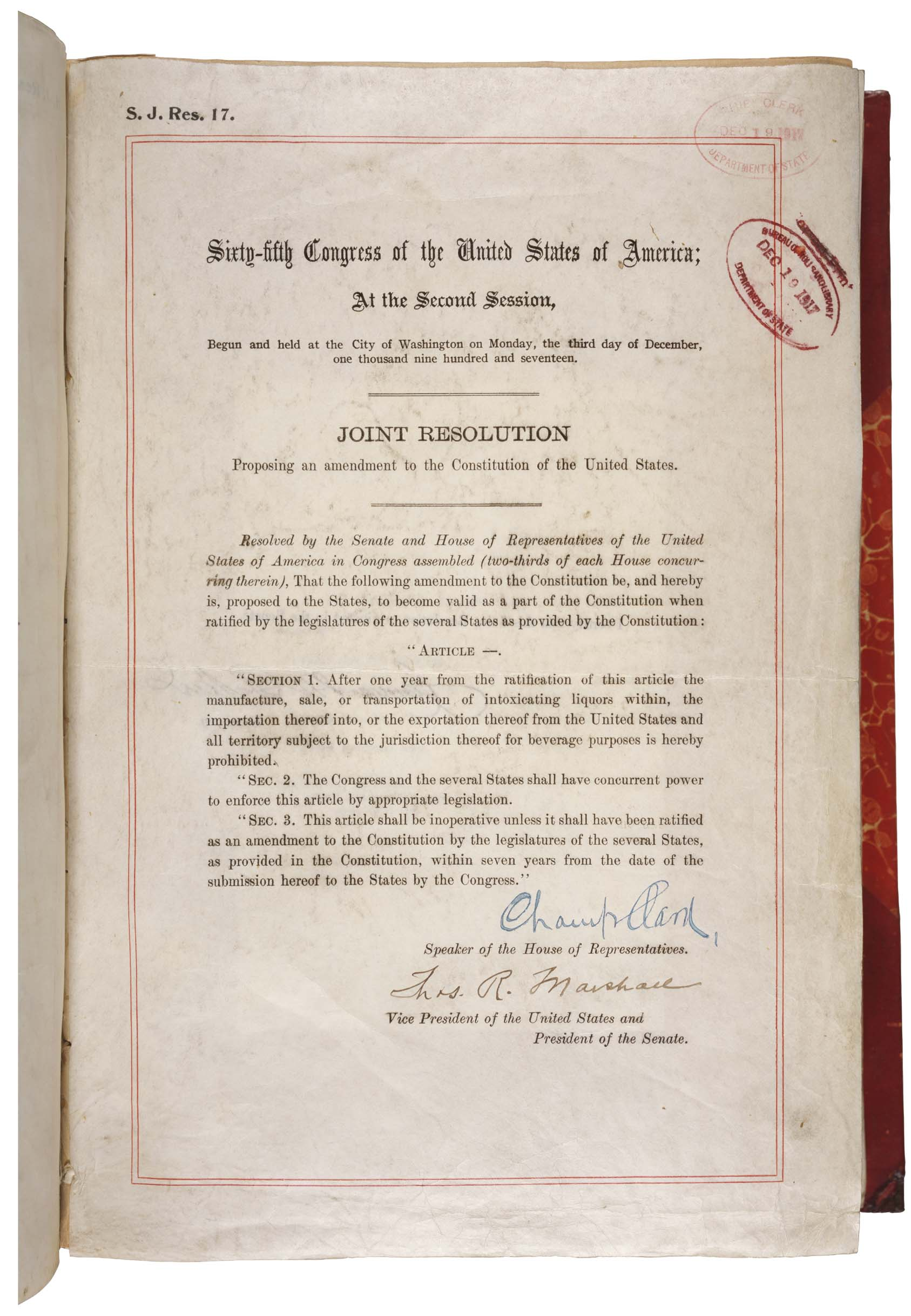
The Eighteenth Amendment in the National Archives

- December 18, 1917: Approved an amendment to the United States Constitution declaring the production, transport, and sale of alcohol (though not the consumption or private possession) illegal, and submitted it to the state legislatures for ratification
  - Amendment was later ratified on January 16, 1919, becoming the Eighteenth Amendment to the United States Constitution

== Party summary ==
=== Senate ===
	Party (shading shows control)		Total	Vacant
	Democratic (D)	Republican (R)	Total	Vacant
End of previous congress	55	41	96	0
Begin	54	42	96	0
End	51	45	96	0
Final voting share	53.1%	46.9%		
Beginning of next congress	47	49	96	0

=== House of Representatives ===
Affiliation	Party (Shading indicates control)						Total	
Affiliation	Democratic (D)	Bull Moose (Prog.)	Socialist (Soc.)	Prohibition (Proh.)	Republican (R)	Other	Total	Vacant
End of previous Congress	227	4	1	1	200	1 (Note: Independent)	434	1
Begin	213	3	1	1	216	0	434	1
End	211	3	1	1	212	0	428	7
Final voting share	50.2%			0.2%	49.5%	0.0%		
Beginning of the next Congress	191	0	1	1	238	1 (Note: Farmer–Labor Party)	432	3

== Leadership ==
=== Senate leadership ===
Senate president

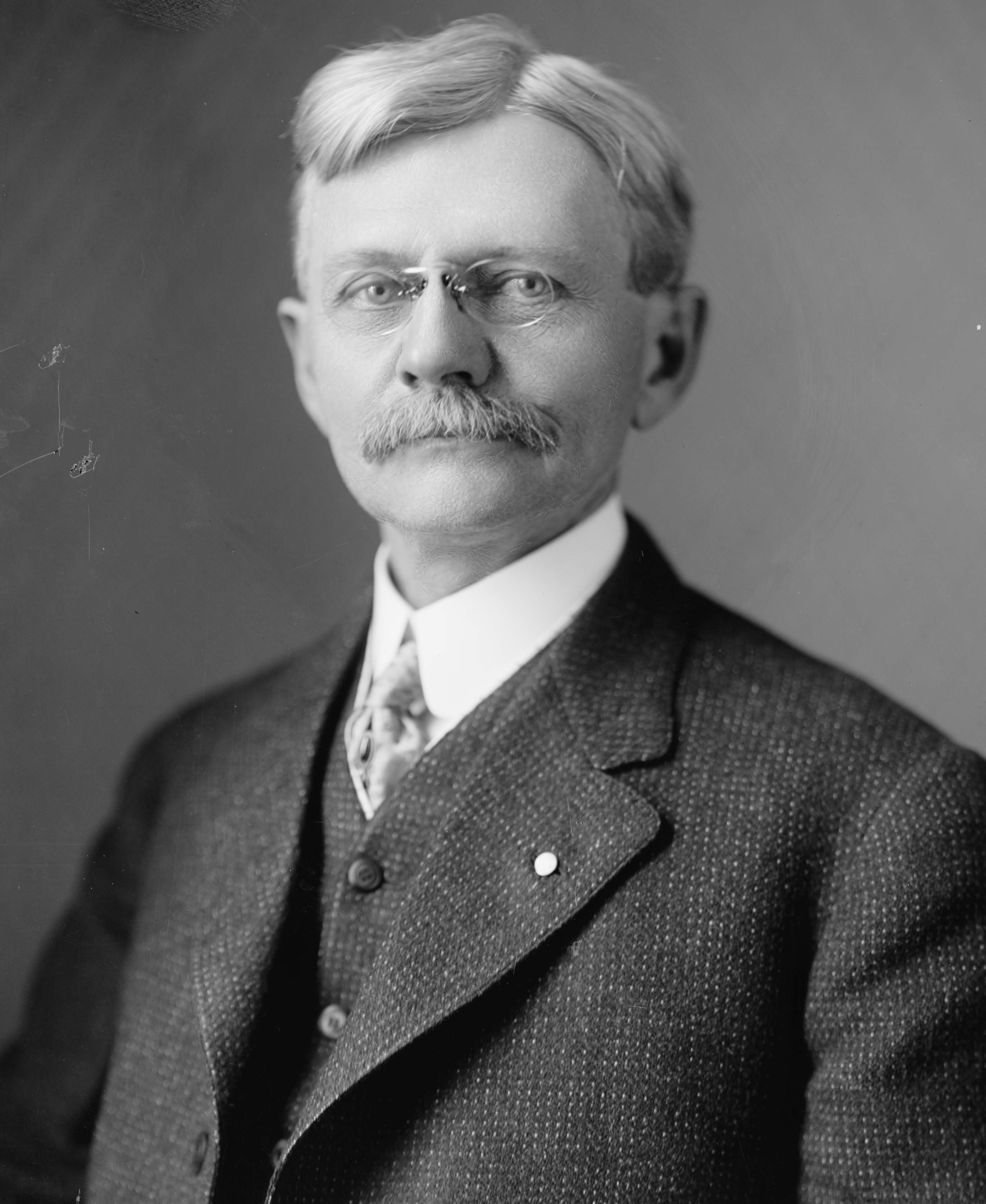
Thomas R. Marshall (D)

Senate president pro tempore

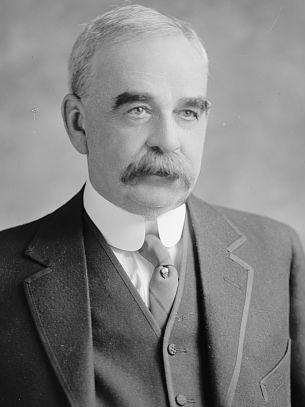
Willard Saulsbury Jr. (D)

==== Presiding ====
- President: Thomas R. Marshall (D)
- President pro tempore: Willard Saulsbury Jr. (D)
- Majority Whip: J. Hamilton Lewis (D)
- Minority Whip: Charles Curtis (R)
- Republican Conference Chairman: Jacob Harold Gallinger (until August 17, 1918)
  - Henry Cabot Lodge (from 1918)
- Democratic Caucus Chairman : Thomas S. Martin
- Republican Conference Secretary: James Wolcott Wadsworth Jr.
- Democratic Caucus Secretary: William H. King

=== House leadership ===
House Speaker

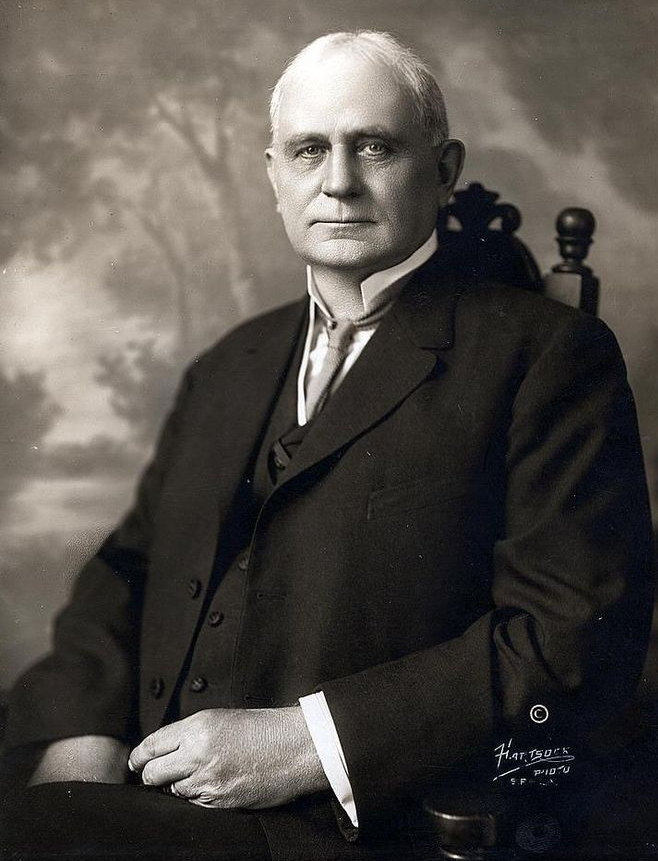
Champ Clark (D)

==== Presiding ====
- Speaker: Champ Clark (D)

==== Majority (Democratic) leadership ====
- Majority Leader: Claude Kitchin
- Majority Whip: vacant
- Democratic Caucus Chairman: Edward W. Saunders
- Democratic Campaign Committee Chairman: Scott Ferris

==== Minority (Republican) leadership ====
- Minority Leader: James R. Mann
- Minority Whip: Charles M. Hamilton
- Republican Conference Chairman: William S. Greene
- Republican Campaign Committee Chairman: Frank P. Woods

== Members ==
Skip to House of Representatives, below

=== Senate ===
Because of the 17th Amendment, starting in 1914 U.S. senators were directly elected instead of by the state legislatures. However, this did not affect the terms of U.S. senators whose terms had started before that Amendment took effect, In this Congress, Class 2 meant their term ended with this Congress, requiring reelection in 1918; Class 3 meant their term began in the last Congress, requiring reelection in 1920; and Class 1 meant their term began in this Congress, requiring reelection in 1922.

==== Alabama ====
▌2. John H. Bankhead (D)
▌3. Oscar Underwood (D)

==== Arizona ====
▌1. Henry F. Ashurst (D)
▌3. Marcus A. Smith (D)

==== Arkansas ====
▌2. Joseph Taylor Robinson (D)
▌3. William F. Kirby (D)

==== California ====
▌1. Hiram W. Johnson (R) (Note: Hiram Johnson (R-California) did not take his seat until March 16, 1917, as he wanted to remain Governor of California. However, he was still elected and qualified as Senator.)
▌3. James D. Phelan (D)

==== Colorado ====
▌2. John F. Shafroth (D)
▌3. Charles S. Thomas (D)

==== Connecticut ====
▌1. George P. McLean (R)
▌3. Frank B. Brandegee (R)

==== Delaware ====
▌1. Josiah O. Wolcott (D)
▌2. Willard Saulsbury Jr. (D)

==== Florida ====
▌1. Park Trammell (D)
▌3. Duncan U. Fletcher (D)

==== Georgia ====
▌2. Thomas W. Hardwick (D)
▌3. Hoke Smith (D)

==== Idaho ====
▌2. William E. Borah (R)
▌3. James H. Brady (R), until January 13, 1918

▌John F. Nugent (D), from January 22, 1918

==== Illinois ====
▌2. James Hamilton Lewis (D)
▌3. Lawrence Y. Sherman (R)

==== Indiana ====
▌1. Harry S. New (R)
▌3. James E. Watson (R)

==== Iowa ====
▌2. William S. Kenyon (R)
▌3. Albert B. Cummins (R)

==== Kansas ====
▌2. William H. Thompson (D)
▌3. Charles Curtis (R)

==== Kentucky ====
▌2. Ollie M. James (D), until August 28, 1918

▌George B. Martin (D), from September 7, 1918

▌3. John C. W. Beckham (D)

==== Louisiana ====
▌2. Joseph E. Ransdell (D)
▌3. Robert F. Broussard (D), until April 12, 1918

▌Walter Guion (D), April 22, 1918 – November 5, 1918
▌Edward J. Gay (D), from November 6, 1918

==== Maine ====
▌1. Frederick Hale (R)
▌2. Bert M. Fernald (R)

==== Maryland ====
▌1. Joseph I. France (R)
▌3. John W. Smith (D)

==== Massachusetts ====
▌1. Henry Cabot Lodge (R)
▌2. John W. Weeks (R)

==== Michigan ====
▌1. Charles E. Townsend (R)
▌2. William Alden Smith (R)

==== Minnesota ====
▌1. Frank B. Kellogg (R)
▌2. Knute Nelson (R)

==== Mississippi ====
▌1. John Sharp Williams (D)
▌2. James K. Vardaman (D)

==== Missouri ====
▌1. James A. Reed (D)
▌3. William J. Stone (D), until April 14, 1918

▌Xenophon P. Wilfley (D), April 30, 1918 – November 5, 1918
▌Selden P. Spencer (R), from November 6, 1918

==== Montana ====
▌1. Henry L. Myers (D)
▌2. Thomas J. Walsh (D)

==== Nebraska ====
▌1. Gilbert M. Hitchcock (D)
▌2. George W. Norris (R)

==== Nevada ====
▌1. Key Pittman (D)
▌3. Francis G. Newlands (D), until December 24, 1917

▌Charles B. Henderson (D), from January 12, 1918

==== New Hampshire ====
▌2. Henry F. Hollis (D)
▌3. Jacob H. Gallinger (R), until August 17, 1918

▌Irving W. Drew (R), September 2, 1918 – November 5, 1918
▌George H. Moses (R), from November 6, 1918

==== New Jersey ====
▌1. Joseph S. Frelinghuysen (R)
▌2. William Hughes (D), until January 30, 1918

▌David Baird (R), from February 23, 1918

==== New Mexico ====
▌1. Andrieus A. Jones (D)
▌2. Albert B. Fall (R)

==== New York ====
▌1. William M. Calder (R)
▌3. James W. Wadsworth Jr. (R)

==== North Carolina ====
▌2. Furnifold M. Simmons (D)
▌3. Lee S. Overman (D)

==== North Dakota ====
▌1. Porter J. McCumber (R)
▌3. Asle Gronna (R)

==== Ohio ====
▌1. Atlee Pomerene (D)
▌3. Warren G. Harding (R)

==== Oklahoma ====
▌2. Robert L. Owen (D)
▌3. Thomas P. Gore (D)

==== Oregon ====
▌2. Harry Lane (D), until May 23, 1917

▌Charles L. McNary (R), May 29, 1917 – November 5, 1918
▌Frederick W. Mulkey (R), November 6, 1918 – December 17, 1918
▌Charles L. McNary (R), from December 18, 1918

▌3. George E. Chamberlain (D)

==== Pennsylvania ====
▌1. Philander C. Knox (R)
▌3. Boies Penrose (R)

==== Rhode Island ====
▌1. Peter G. Gerry (D)
▌2. LeBaron B. Colt (R)

==== South Carolina ====
▌2. Benjamin R. Tillman (D), until July 3, 1918

▌Christie Benet (D), July 6, 1918 – November 5, 1918
▌William P. Pollock (D), from November 6, 1918

▌3. Ellison D. Smith (D)

==== South Dakota ====
▌2. Thomas Sterling (R)
▌3. Edwin S. Johnson (D)

==== Tennessee ====
▌1. Kenneth D. McKellar (D)
▌2. John K. Shields (D)

==== Texas ====
▌1. Charles A. Culberson (D)
▌2. Morris Sheppard (D)

==== Utah ====
▌1. William H. King (D)
▌3. Reed Smoot (R)

==== Vermont ====
▌1. Carroll S. Page (R)
▌3. William P. Dillingham (R)

==== Virginia ====
▌1. Claude A. Swanson (D)
▌2. Thomas S. Martin (D)

==== Washington ====
▌1. Miles Poindexter (R)
▌3. Wesley L. Jones (R)

==== West Virginia ====
▌1. Howard Sutherland (R)
▌2. Nathan Goff (R)

==== Wisconsin ====
▌1. Robert M. La Follette (R)
▌2. Paul O. Husting (D), until October 21, 1917

▌2. Irvine Lenroot (R), from April 8, 1918

==== Wyoming ====
▌1. John B. Kendrick (D)
▌2. Francis E. Warren (R)

Senators' party membership by state at the opening of the 65th Congress in March 1917. 2 Democrats 1 Democrat and 1 Republican 2 Republicans

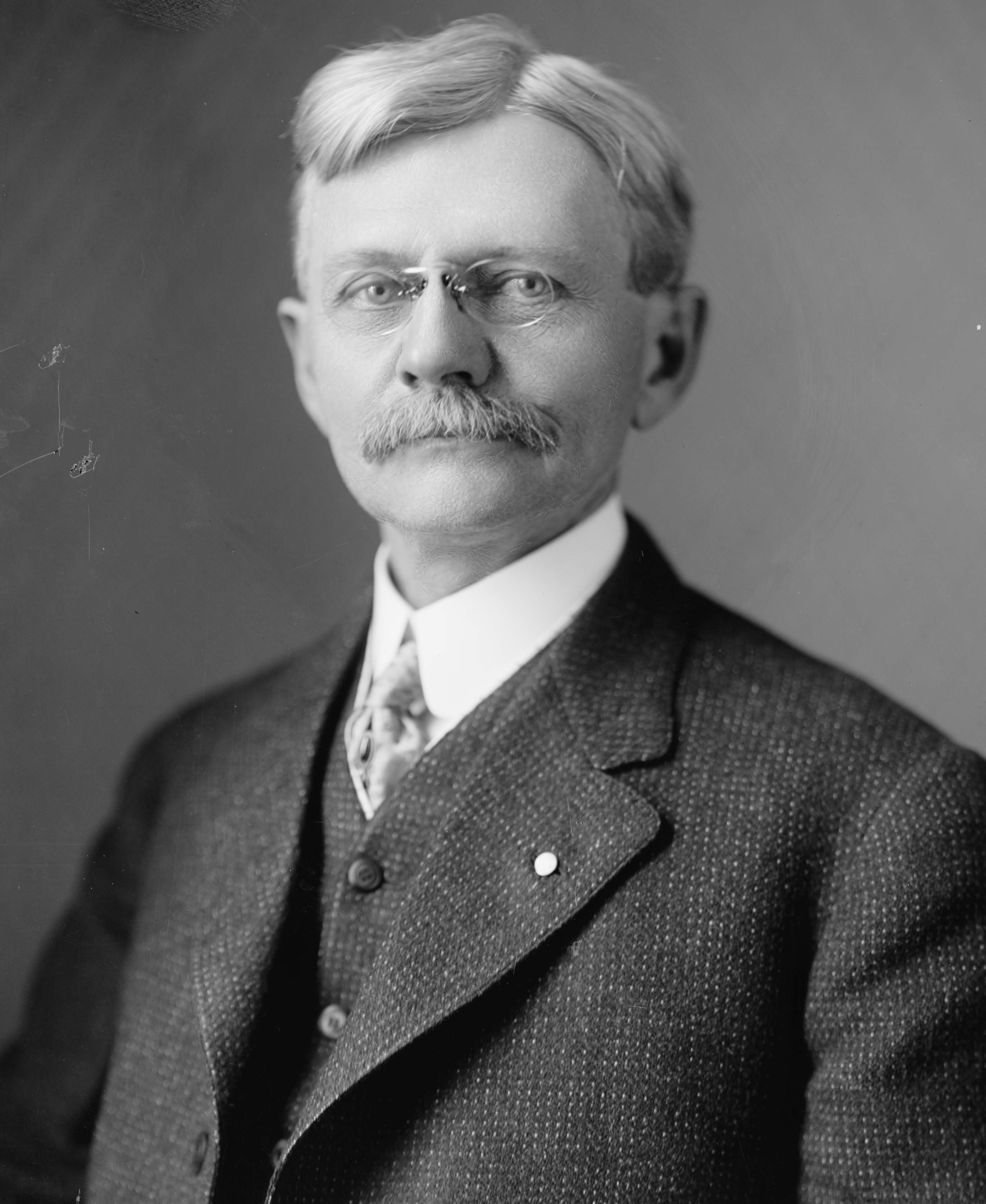
Senate President Thomas R. Marshall

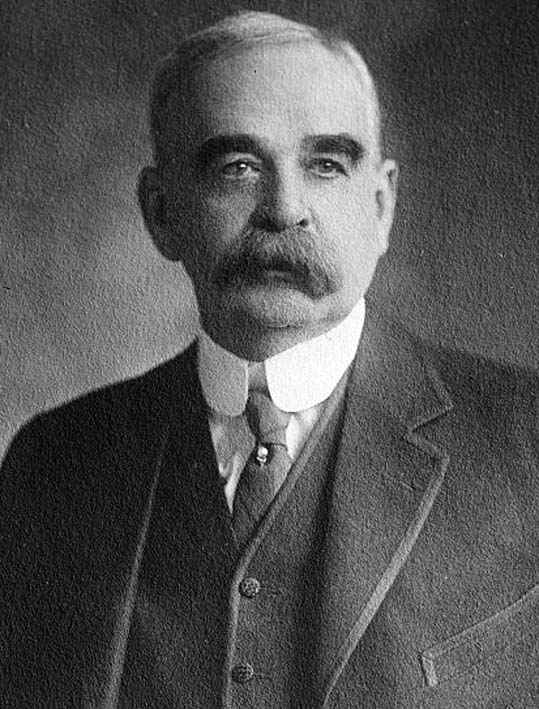
Senate President pro tempore Willard Saulsbury Jr.

=== House of Representatives ===
==== Alabama ====
▌1. Oscar Lee Gray (D)
▌2. S. Hubert Dent Jr. (D)
▌3. Henry B. Steagall (D)
▌4. Fred L. Blackmon (D)
▌5. J. Thomas Heflin (D)
▌6. William B. Oliver (D)
▌7. John L. Burnett (D)
▌8. Edward B. Almon (D)
▌9. George Huddleston (D)
▌10. William B. Bankhead (D)

==== Arizona ====
▌At-large. Carl Hayden (D)

==== Arkansas ====
▌1. Thaddeus H. Caraway (D)
▌2. William A. Oldfield (D)
▌3. John N. Tillman (D)
▌4. Otis Wingo (D)
▌5. Henderson M. Jacoway (D)
▌6. Samuel M. Taylor (D)
▌7. William S. Goodwin (D)

==== California ====
▌1. Clarence F. Lea (D)
▌2. John E. Raker (D)
▌3. Charles F. Curry (R)
▌4. Julius Kahn (R)
▌5. John I. Nolan (R)
▌6. John A. Elston (Prog.)
▌7. Denver S. Church (D)
▌8. Everis A. Hayes (R)
▌9. Charles H. Randall (Proh.)
▌10. Henry Z. Osborne (R)
▌11. William Kettner (D)

==== Colorado ====
▌1. Benjamin Hilliard (D)
▌2. Charles Bateman Timberlake (R)
▌3. Edward Keating (D)
▌4. Edward T. Taylor (D)

==== Connecticut ====
▌1. Augustine Lonergan (D)
▌2. Richard P. Freeman (R)
▌3. John Q. Tilson (R)
▌4. Ebenezer J. Hill (R), until September 27, 1917

▌Schuyler Merritt (R), from November 6, 1917

▌5. James P. Glynn (R)

==== Delaware ====
▌At-large. Albert F. Polk (D)

==== Florida ====
▌1. Herbert J. Drane (D)
▌2. Frank Clark (D)
▌3. Walter Kehoe (D)
▌4. William J. Sears (D)

==== Georgia ====
▌1. James W. Overstreet (D)
▌2. Frank Park (D)
▌3. Charles R. Crisp (D)
▌4. William C. Adamson (D), until December 18, 1917

▌William C. Wright (D), from January 16, 1918

▌5. William S. Howard (D)
▌6. James W. Wise (D)
▌7. Gordon Lee (D)
▌8. Charles H. Brand (D)
▌9. Thomas Montgomery Bell (D)
▌10. Carl Vinson (D)
▌11. John R. Walker (D)
▌12. William W. Larsen (D)

==== Idaho ====
▌At-large. Addison T. Smith (R)
▌At-large. Burton L. French (R)

==== Illinois ====
▌1. Martin B. Madden (R)
▌2. James R. Mann (R)
▌3. William W. Wilson (R)
▌4. Charles Martin (D), until October 28, 1917

▌John W. Rainey (D), from April 2, 1918

▌5. Adolph J. Sabath (D)
▌6. James McAndrews (D)
▌7. Niels Juul (R)
▌8. Thomas Gallagher (D)
▌9. Frederick A. Britten (R)
▌10. George E. Foss (R)
▌11. Ira C. Copley (R)
▌12. Charles Eugene Fuller (R)
▌13. John C. McKenzie (R)
▌14. William J. Graham (R)
▌15. Edward John King (R)
▌16. Clifford Ireland (R)
▌17. John A. Sterling (R), until October 17, 1918
▌18. Joseph G. Cannon (R)
▌19. William B. McKinley (R)
▌20. Henry T. Rainey (D)
▌21. Loren E. Wheeler (R)
▌22. William A. Rodenberg (R)
▌23. Martin D. Foster (D)
▌24. Thomas S. Williams (R)
▌25. Edward E. Denison (R)
▌At-large. J. Medill McCormick (R)
▌At-large. William E. Mason (R)

==== Indiana ====
▌1. George K. Denton (D)
▌2. Oscar E. Bland (R)
▌3. William E. Cox (D)
▌4. Lincoln Dixon (D)
▌5. Everett Sanders (R)
▌6. Daniel Webster Comstock (R), until May 19, 1917

▌Richard N. Elliott (R), from June 29, 1917

▌7. Merrill Moores (R)
▌8. Albert H. Vestal (R)
▌9. Fred S. Purnell (R)
▌10. William R. Wood (R)
▌11. Milton Kraus (R)
▌12. Louis W. Fairfield (R)
▌13. Henry A. Barnhart (D)

==== Iowa ====
▌1. Charles A. Kennedy (R)
▌2. Harry E. Hull (R)
▌3. Burton E. Sweet (R)
▌4. Gilbert N. Haugen (R)
▌5. James W. Good (R)
▌6. C. William Ramseyer (R)
▌7. Cassius C. Dowell (R)
▌8. Horace M. Towner (R)
▌9. William R. Green (R)
▌10. Frank P. Woods (R)
▌11. George Cromwell Scott (R)

==== Kansas ====
▌1. Daniel Read Anthony Jr. (R)
▌2. Edward C. Little (R)
▌3. Philip P. Campbell (R)
▌4. Dudley Doolittle (D)
▌5. Guy T. Helvering (D)
▌6. John R. Connelly (D)
▌7. Jouett Shouse (D)
▌8. William A. Ayres (D)

==== Kentucky ====
▌1. Alben Barkley (D)
▌2. David Hayes Kincheloe (D)
▌3. Robert Y. Thomas Jr. (D)
▌4. Ben Johnson (D)
▌5. J. Swagar Sherley (D)
▌6. Arthur B. Rouse (D)
▌7. J. Campbell Cantrill (D)
▌8. Harvey Helm (D), until March 3, 1919
▌9. William Jason Fields (D)
▌10. John W. Langley (R)
▌11. Caleb Powers (R)

==== Louisiana ====
▌1. Albert Estopinal (D)
▌2. Henry Garland Dupré (D)
▌3. Whitmell P. Martin (Prog.)
▌4. John Thomas Watkins (D)
▌5. Riley Joseph Wilson (D)
▌6. Jared Y. Sanders Sr. (D)
▌7. Ladislas Lazaro (D)
▌8. James Benjamin Aswell (D)

==== Maine ====
▌1. Louis B. Goodall (R)
▌2. Wallace H. White Jr. (R)
▌3. John A. Peters (R)
▌4. Ira G. Hersey (R)

==== Maryland ====
▌1. Jesse D. Price (D)
▌2. J. Frederick C. Talbott (D), until October 5, 1918

▌Carville Benson (D), from November 5, 1918

▌3. Charles P. Coady (D)
▌4. J. Charles Linthicum (D)
▌5. Sydney Emanuel Mudd II (R)
▌6. Frederick N. Zihlman (R)

==== Massachusetts ====
▌1. Allen T. Treadway (R)
▌2. Frederick H. Gillett (R)
▌3. Calvin D. Paige (R)
▌4. Samuel E. Winslow (R)
▌5. John J. Rogers (R)
▌6. Augustus P. Gardner (R), until May 15, 1917

▌Willfred W. Lufkin (R), from November 6, 1917

▌7. Michael F. Phelan (D)
▌8. Frederick W. Dallinger (R)
▌9. Alvan T. Fuller (R)
▌10. Peter F. Tague (D)
▌11. George H. Tinkham (R)
▌12. James A. Gallivan (D)
▌13. William H. Carter (R)
▌14. Richard Olney II (D)
▌15. William S. Greene (R)
▌16. Joseph Walsh (R)

==== Michigan ====
▌1. Frank E. Doremus (D)
▌2. Mark R. Bacon (R), until December 13, 1917

▌Samuel Beakes (D), from December 13, 1917

▌3. John M. C. Smith (R)
▌4. Edward L. Hamilton (R)
▌5. Carl Mapes (R)
▌6. Patrick H. Kelley (R)
▌7. Louis C. Cramton (R)
▌8. Joseph W. Fordney (R)
▌9. James C. McLaughlin (R)
▌10. Gilbert A. Currie (R)
▌11. Frank D. Scott (R)
▌12. W. Frank James (R)
▌13. Charles Archibald Nichols (R)

==== Minnesota ====
▌1. Sydney Anderson (R)
▌2. Franklin Ellsworth (R)
▌3. Charles Russell Davis (R)
▌4. Carl Van Dyke (D)
▌5. Ernest Lundeen (R)
▌6. Harold Knutson (R)
▌7. Andrew Volstead (R)
▌8. Clarence B. Miller (R)
▌9. Halvor Steenerson (R)
▌10. Thomas D. Schall (R)

==== Mississippi ====
▌1. Ezekiel S. Candler Jr. (D)
▌2. Hubert D. Stephens (D)
▌3. Benjamin G. Humphreys II (D)
▌4. Thomas U. Sisson (D)
▌5. William Webb Venable (D)
▌6. Pat Harrison (D)
▌7. Percy E. Quin (D)
▌8. James W. Collier (D)

==== Missouri ====
▌1. Milton A. Romjue (D)
▌2. William W. Rucker (D)
▌3. Joshua Willis Alexander (D)
▌4. Charles F. Booher (D)
▌5. William Patterson Borland (D), until February 20, 1919
▌6. Clement C. Dickinson (D)
▌7. Courtney W. Hamlin (D)
▌8. Dorsey W. Shackleford (D)
▌9. James Beauchamp Clark (D)
▌10. Jacob Edwin Meeker (R), until October 16, 1918

▌Frederick Essen (R), from November 5, 1918

▌11. William Leo Igoe (D)
▌12. Leonidas C. Dyer (R)
▌13. Walter Lewis Hensley (D)
▌14. Joseph J. Russell (D)
▌15. Perl D. Decker (D)
▌16. Thomas L. Rubey (D)

==== Montana ====
▌At-large. John M. Evans (D)
▌At-large. Jeannette Rankin (R)

==== Nebraska ====
▌1. C. Frank Reavis (R)
▌2. Charles O. Lobeck (D)
▌3. Dan V. Stephens (D)
▌4. Charles Henry Sloan (R)
▌5. Ashton C. Shallenberger (D)
▌6. Moses P. Kinkaid (R)

==== Nevada ====
▌At-large. Edwin E. Roberts (R)

==== New Hampshire ====
▌1. Cyrus A. Sulloway (R), until March 11, 1917

▌Sherman Everett Burroughs (R), from May 29, 1917

▌2. Edward Hills Wason (R)

==== New Jersey ====
▌1. William J. Browning (R)
▌2. Isaac Bacharach (R)
▌3. Thomas J. Scully (D)
▌4. Elijah C. Hutchinson (R)
▌5. John H. Capstick (R), until March 17, 1918

▌William F. Birch (R), from November 5, 1918

▌6. John R. Ramsey (R)
▌7. Dow H. Drukker (R)
▌8. Edward W. Gray (R)
▌9. Richard Wayne Parker (R)
▌10. Frederick R. Lehlbach (R)
▌11. John J. Eagan (D)
▌12. James A. Hamill (D)

==== New Mexico ====
▌At-large. William Bell Walton (D)

==== New York ====
▌1. Frederick C. Hicks (R)
▌2. C. Pope Caldwell (D)
▌3. Joseph V. Flynn (D)
▌4. Harry H. Dale (D), until January 6, 1919
▌5. James P. Maher (D)
▌6. Frederick W. Rowe (R)
▌7. John J. Fitzgerald (D), until December 31, 1917

▌John J. Delaney (D), from March 5, 1918

▌8. Daniel J. Griffin (D), until December 31, 1917

▌William E. Cleary (D), from March 5, 1918

▌9. Oscar W. Swift (R)
▌10. Reuben L. Haskell (R)
▌11. Daniel J. Riordan (D)
▌12. Meyer London (Soc.)
▌13. Christopher D. Sullivan (D)
▌14. Fiorello H. LaGuardia (R)
▌15. Thomas Francis Smith (D), from April 12, 1917
▌16. Peter J. Dooling (D)
▌17. John F. Carew (D)
▌18. George B. Francis (R)
▌19. Walter M. Chandler (R)
▌20. Isaac Siegel (R)
▌21. G. Murray Hulbert (D), until January 1, 1918

▌Jerome F. Donovan (D), from March 5, 1918

▌22. Henry Bruckner (D), until December 31, 1917

▌Anthony J. Griffin (D), from March 5, 1918

▌23. Daniel C. Oliver (D)
▌24. Benjamin L. Fairchild (R)
▌25. James W. Husted (R)
▌26. Edmund Platt (R)
▌27. Charles B. Ward (R)
▌28. Rollin B. Sanford (R)
▌29. James S. Parker (R)
▌30. George R. Lunn (D)
▌31. Bertrand H. Snell (R)
▌32. Luther W. Mott (R)
▌33. Homer P. Snyder (R)
▌34. George W. Fairchild (R)
▌35. Walter W. Magee (R)
▌36. Norman J. Gould (R)
▌37. Harry H. Pratt (R)
▌38. Thomas B. Dunn (R)
▌39. Archie D. Sanders (R)
▌40. S. Wallace Dempsey (R)
▌41. Charles B. Smith (D)
▌42. William F. Waldow (R)
▌43. Charles M. Hamilton (R)

==== North Carolina ====
▌1. John Humphrey Small (D)
▌2. Claude Kitchin (D)
▌3. George E. Hood (D)
▌4. Edward W. Pou (D)
▌5. Charles M. Stedman (D)
▌6. Hannibal L. Godwin (D)
▌7. Leonidas D. Robinson (D)
▌8. Robert L. Doughton (D)
▌9. Edwin Y. Webb (D)
▌10. Zebulon Weaver (D), until March 1, 1919

▌James Jefferson Britt (R), from March 1, 1919

==== North Dakota ====
▌1. Henry Thomas Helgesen (R), until April 10, 1917

▌John Miller Baer (R), from July 20, 1917

▌2. George M. Young (R)
▌3. Patrick Daniel Norton (R)

==== Ohio ====
▌1. Nicholas Longworth (R)
▌2. Victor Heintz (R)
▌3. Warren Gard (D)
▌4. Benjamin F. Welty (D)
▌5. John S. Snook (D)
▌6. Charles C. Kearns (R)
▌7. Simeon D. Fess (R)
▌8. John A. Key (D)
▌9. Isaac R. Sherwood (D)
▌10. Robert M. Switzer (R)
▌11. Horatio C. Claypool (D)
▌12. Clement L. Brumbaugh (D)
▌13. Arthur W. Overmyer (D)
▌14. Ellsworth R. Bathrick (D), until December 23, 1917

▌Martin L. Davey (D), from November 5, 1918

▌15. George White (D)
▌16. Roscoe C. McCulloch (R)
▌17. William A. Ashbrook (D)
▌18. David Hollingsworth (R)
▌19. John G. Cooper (R)
▌20. William Gordon (D)
▌21. Robert Crosser (D)
▌22. Henry I. Emerson (R)

==== Oklahoma ====
▌1. Thomas Alberter Chandler (R)
▌2. William W. Hastings (D)
▌3. Charles D. Carter (D)
▌4. Tom D. McKeown (D)
▌5. Joseph Bryan Thompson (D)
▌6. Scott Ferris (D)
▌7. James V. McClintic (D)
▌8. Dick Thompson Morgan (R)

==== Oregon ====
▌1. Willis C. Hawley (R)
▌2. Nicholas J. Sinnott (R)
▌3. Clifton N. McArthur (R)

==== Pennsylvania ====
▌1. William S. Vare (R)
▌2. George S. Graham (R)
▌3. J. Hampton Moore (R)
▌4. George W. Edmonds (R)
▌5. Peter E. Costello (R)
▌6. George P. Darrow (R)
▌7. Thomas S. Butler (R)
▌8. Henry Winfield Watson (R)
▌9. William W. Griest (R)
▌10. John R. Farr (R)
▌11. Thomas W. Templeton (R)
▌12. Robert D. Heaton (R)
▌13. Arthur G. Dewalt (D)
▌14. Louis T. McFadden (R)
▌15. Edgar R. Kiess (R)
▌16. John V. Lesher (D)
▌17. Benjamin K. Focht (R)
▌18. Aaron S. Kreider (R)
▌19. John M. Rose (R)
▌20. Andrew R. Brodbeck (D)
▌21. Charles H. Rowland (R)
▌22. Edward E. Robbins (R), until January 25, 1919
▌23. Bruce F. Sterling (D)
▌24. Henry W. Temple (R)
▌25. Henry A. Clark (R)
▌26. Henry J. Steele (D)
▌27. Nathan L. Strong (R)
▌28. Orrin D. Bleakley (R), until April 3, 1917

▌Earl Hanley Beshlin (D), from November 6, 1917

▌29. Stephen G. Porter (R)
▌30. M. Clyde Kelly (Prog.)
▌31. John M. Morin (R)
▌32. Guy E. Campbell (D)
▌At-large. Thomas S. Crago (R)
▌At-large. John R. K. Scott (R), until January 5, 1919
▌At-large. Joseph McLaughlin (R)
▌At-large. Mahlon M. Garland (R)

==== Rhode Island ====
▌1. George Francis O'Shaunessy (D)
▌2. Walter Russell Stiness (R)
▌3. Ambrose Kennedy (R)

==== South Carolina ====
▌1. Richard S. Whaley (D)
▌2. James F. Byrnes (D)
▌3. Fred H. Dominick (D)
▌4. Samuel J. Nicholls (D)
▌5. William F. Stevenson (D)
▌6. J. Willard Ragsdale (D)
▌7. Asbury F. Lever (D)

==== South Dakota ====
▌1. Charles H. Dillon (R)
▌2. Royal C. Johnson (R)
▌3. Harry L. Gandy (D)

==== Tennessee ====
▌1. Sam R. Sells (R)
▌2. Richard W. Austin (R)
▌3. John A. Moon (D)
▌4. Cordell Hull (D)
▌5. William C. Houston (D)
▌6. Joseph W. Byrns (D)
▌7. Lemuel P. Padgett (D)
▌8. Thetus W. Sims (D)
▌9. Finis J. Garrett (D)
▌10. Hubert Fisher (D)

==== Texas ====
▌1. Eugene Black (D)
▌2. Martin Dies (D)
▌3. James Young (D)
▌4. Sam Rayburn (D)
▌5. Hatton W. Sumners (D)
▌6. Rufus Hardy (D)
▌7. Alexander W. Gregg (D)
▌8. Joe H. Eagle (D)
▌9. Joseph J. Mansfield (D)
▌10. James P. Buchanan (D)
▌11. Tom T. Connally (D)
▌12. James Clifton Wilson (D), until March 3, 1919
▌13. John Marvin Jones (D)
▌14. James L. Slayden (D)
▌15. John Nance Garner (D)
▌16. Thomas L. Blanton (D)
▌At-large. Daniel E. Garrett (D)
▌At-large. A. Jeff McLemore (D)

==== Utah ====
▌1. Milton H. Welling (D)
▌2. James Henry Mays (D)

==== Vermont ====
▌1. Frank L. Greene (R)
▌2. Porter H. Dale (R)

==== Virginia ====
▌1. William A. Jones (D), until April 17, 1918

▌S. Otis Bland (D), from July 2, 1918

▌2. Edward Everett Holland (D)
▌3. Andrew Jackson Montague (D)
▌4. Walter Allen Watson (D)
▌5. Edward W. Saunders (D)
▌6. Carter Glass (D), until December 16, 1918

▌James P. Woods (D), from February 25, 1919

▌7. Thomas W. Harrison (D)
▌8. Charles Creighton Carlin (D)
▌9. C. Bascom Slemp (R)
▌10. Henry D. Flood (D)

==== Washington ====
▌1. John F. Miller (R)
▌2. Lindley H. Hadley (R)
▌3. Albert Johnson (R)
▌4. William Leroy La Follette (R)
▌5. Clarence Cleveland Dill (D)

==== West Virginia ====
▌1. Matthew M. Neely (D)
▌2. George M. Bowers (R)
▌3. Stuart F. Reed (R)
▌4. Harry C. Woodyard (R)
▌5. Edward Cooper (R)
▌6. Adam B. Littlepage (D)

==== Wisconsin ====
▌1. Henry Allen Cooper (R)
▌2. Edward Voigt (R)
▌3. John M. Nelson (R)
▌4. William J. Cary (R)
▌5. William H. Stafford (R)
▌6. James H. Davidson (R), until August 6, 1918

▌Florian Lampert (R), from November 5, 1918

▌7. John J. Esch (R)
▌8. Edward E. Browne (R)
▌9. David G. Classon (R)
▌10. James A. Frear (R)
▌11. Irvine L. Lenroot (R), until April 17, 1918

▌Adolphus P. Nelson (R), from November 5, 1918

==== Wyoming ====
▌At-large. Franklin W. Mondell (R)

==== Non-voting members ====
▌Alaska Territory. Charles A. Sulzer (D), until January 7, 1919

▌James Wickersham (R), from January 7, 1919

▌Hawaii Territory. Jonah Kūhiō Kalanianaʻole (R)
▌Philippines. Jaime C. de Veyra (Resident Commissioner), (Nac.)
▌Philippines. Teodoro R. Yangco (Resident Commissioner), (Nac.)
▌Puerto Rico. Félix Córdova Dávila (Resident Commissioner), (Unionist), from August 7, 1917

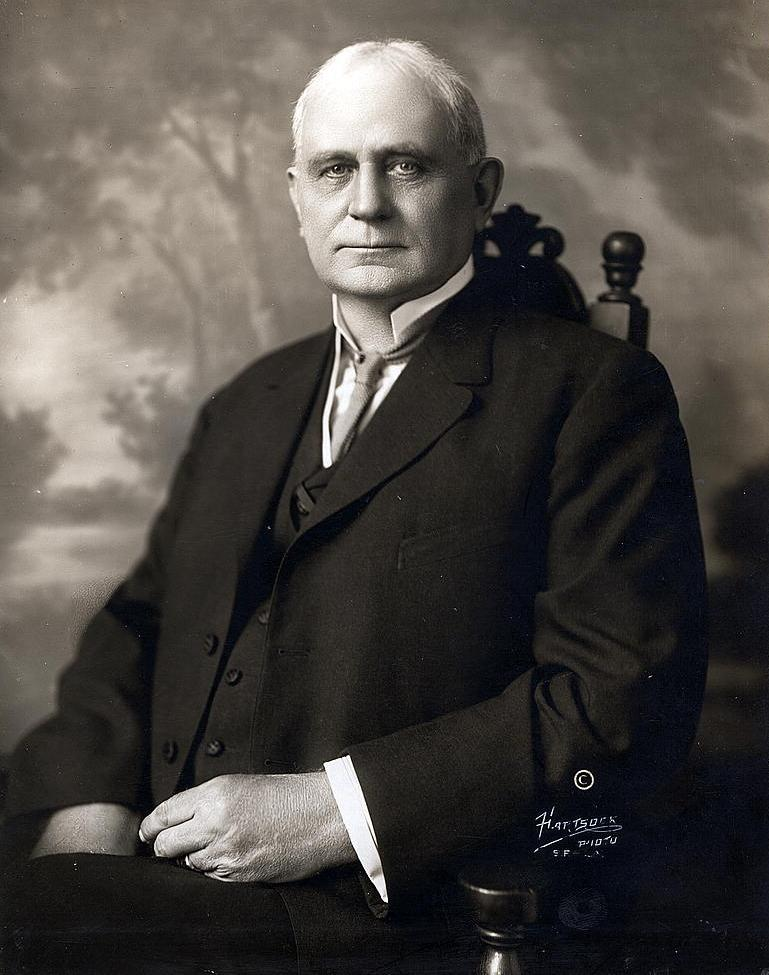
House Speaker Champ Clark

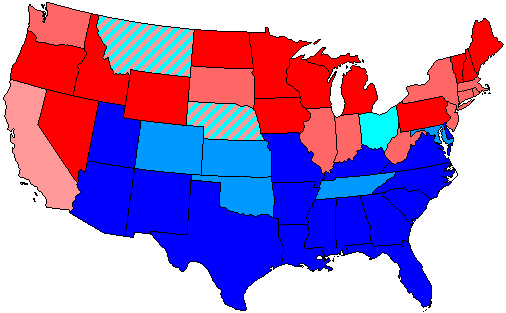
House seats by party holding plurality in state: 80.1-100% Democratic / 80.1-100% Republican; 60.1-80% Democratic / 60.1-80% Republican; Up to 60% Democratic / Up to 60% Republican

== Changes in membership ==
The count below reflects changes from the beginning of the first session of this Congress.

=== Senate ===
- Replacements: 17
  - Democratic: 3-seat net loss
  - Republican: 3-seat net gain
- Deaths: 10
- Resignations: 1
- Vacancy: 0
- Total seats with changes: 10

State	Senator	Reason for vacancy	Successor	Date of successor's installation
Oregon (2)	Harry Lane (D)	Died May 23, 1917. Successor was appointed.	Charles L. McNary (R)	May 29, 1917
Wisconsin (3)	Paul O. Husting (D)	Died October 21, 1917. Successor was elected.	Irvine Lenroot (R)	April 18, 1918
Nevada (3)	Francis G. Newlands (D)	Died December 24, 1917. Successor was appointed and subsequently elected.	Charles Henderson (D)	January 12, 1918
Idaho (3)	James H. Brady (R)	Died January 13, 1918. Successor appointed and elected November 5, 1918.	John F. Nugent (D)	January 22, 1918
New Jersey (2)	William Hughes (D)	Died January 30, 1918. Successor appointed February 23, 1918, and elected November 5, 1918.	David Baird Sr. (R)	February 23, 1918
Louisiana (3)	Robert F. Broussard (D)	Died April 12, 1918. Successor was appointed.	Walter Guion (D)	April 22, 1918
Missouri (3)	William J. Stone (D)	Died April 14, 1918. Successor was appointed.	Xenophon P. Wilfley (D)	April 30, 1918
South Carolina (2)	Benjamin Tillman (D)	Died July 3, 1918. Successor was appointed.	Christie Benet (D)	July 6, 1918
New Hampshire (3)	Jacob H. Gallinger (R)	Died August 17, 1918. Successor was appointed.	Irving W. Drew (R)	September 2, 1918
Kentucky (2)	Ollie M. James (D)	Died August 28, 1918. Successor was appointed.	George B. Martin (D)	September 7, 1918
Louisiana (3)	Walter Guion (D)	Interim appointee replaced by elected successor.	Edward Gay (D)	November 6, 1918
Missouri (3)	Xenophon P. Wilfley (D)	Interim appointee replaced by elected successor.	Selden P. Spencer (R)	November 6, 1918
New Hampshire (3)	Irving W. Drew (R)	Interim appointee replaced by elected successor.	George H. Moses (R)	November 6, 1918
Oregon (2)	Charles L. McNary (R)	Interim appointee replaced by elected successor.	Frederick W. Mulkey (R)	November 6, 1918
South Carolina (2)	Christie Benet (D)	Interim appointee replaced by elected successor.	William P. Pollock (D)	November 6, 1918
Oregon (2)	Frederick W. Mulkey (R)	Resigned December 17, 1918, to give successor preferential seniority. Successor was appointed.	Charles L. McNary (R)	December 18, 1918

=== House of Representatives ===
- replacements: 23
  - Democratic: no net change
  - Republican: no net change
- Deaths: 15
- Resignations: 12
- Contested elections: 3
- Total seats with changes: 31

District	Vacated by	Reason for vacancy	Successor	Date of successor's installation
New York 15th	Vacant	Rep. Michael F. Conry died during previous congress. Successor was elected.	Thomas F. Smith (D)	April 12, 1917
New Hampshire 1st	Cyrus A. Sulloway (R)	Died March 11, 1917. Successor was elected.	Sherman E. Burroughs (R)	May 29, 1917
Pennsylvania 28th	Orrin D. Bleakley (R)	Resigned April 3, 1917, after being convicted and fined under the Federal Corrupt Practices Act. Successor was elected.	Earl H. Beshlin (D)	November 6, 1917
North Dakota 1st	Henry T. Helgesen (R)	Died April 10, 1917. Successor was elected.	John M. Baer (R)	July 20, 1917
Massachusetts 6th	Augustus P. Gardner (R)	Resigned May 15, 1917, to join the U.S. Army. Successor was elected.	Willfred W. Lufkin (R)	November 6, 1917
Indiana 6th	Daniel W. Comstock (R)	Died May 19, 1917. Successor was elected.	Richard N. Elliott (R)	June 29, 1917
Connecticut 4th	Ebenezer J. Hill (R)	Died September 27, 1917. Successor was elected.	Schuyler Merritt (R)	November 6, 1917
Illinois 4th	Charles Martin (D)	Resigned October 28, 1917. Successor was elected.	John W. Rainey (D)	April 2, 1918
Michigan 2nd	Mark R. Bacon (R)	Lost contested election December 13, 1917.	Samuel Beakes (D)	December 13, 1917
Georgia 4th	William C. Adamson (D)	Resigned December 18, 1917. Successor was elected.	William C. Wright (D)	January 6, 1918
Ohio 14th	Ellsworth R. Bathrick (D)	Died December 23, 1917. Successor was elected.	Martin L. Davey (D)	November 5, 1918
New York 7th	John J. Fitzgerald (D)	Resigned December 31, 1917. Successor was elected.	John J. Delaney (D)	March 5, 1918
New York 8th	Daniel J. Griffin (D)	Resigned December 31, 1917, after being elected Sheriff of Kings County, New York. Successor was elected.	William E. Cleary (D)	March 5, 1918
New York 22nd	Henry Bruckner (D)	Resigned December 31, 1917. Successor was elected.	Anthony J. Griffin (D)	March 5, 1918
New York 21st	George M. Hulbert (D)	Resigned January 1, 1918, to become Commissioner of Docks and director of the Port of New York. Successor was elected.	Jerome F. Donovan (D)	March 5, 1918
New Jersey 5th	John H. Capstick (R)	Died March 17, 1918. Successor was elected.	William F. Birch (R)	November 5, 1918
Virginia 1st	William A. Jones (D)	Died April 17, 1918. Successor was elected.	S. Otis Bland (D)	July 2, 1918
Wisconsin 11th	Irvine Lenroot (R)	Resigned April 17, 1918, after being elected to the U.S. Senate. Successor was elected.	Adolphus P. Nelson (R)	November 5, 1918
Wisconsin 6th	James H. Davidson (R)	Died August 6, 1918. Successor was elected.	Florian Lampert (R)	November 5, 1918
Maryland 2nd	Fred Talbott (D)	Died October 5, 1918. Successor was elected.	Carville Benson (D)	November 5, 1918
Missouri 10th	Jacob E. Meeker (R)	Died October 16, 1918. Successor was elected.	Frederick Essen (R)	November 5, 1918
Illinois 17th	John Allen Sterling (R)	Died October 17, 1918.	Seat remained vacant until next Congress.	
Virginia 6th	Carter Glass (D)	Resigned December 6, 1918, after being appointed United States Secretary of the Treasury.	James P. Woods (D)	February 25, 1919
Pennsylvania At-large	John R. K. Scott (R)	Resigned January 5, 1919.	Seat remained vacant until next Congress.	
New York 4th	Harry H. Dale (D)	Resigned January 6, 1919, after being appointed judge of magistrate court.	Seat remained vacant until next Congress.	
Alaska Territory	Charles A. Sulzer (D)	Lost contested election January 7, 1919.	James Wickersham (R)	January 7, 1919
Pennsylvania 22nd	Edward E. Robbins (R)	Died January 25, 1919.	Seat remained vacant until next Congress.	
Missouri 5th	William P. Borland (D)	Died February 20, 1919.	Seat remained vacant until next Congress.	
North Carolina 10th	Zebulon Weaver (D)	Lost seat after House vote on contested election on March 1, 1919.	James J. Britt (R)	March 1, 1919
Kentucky 8th	Harvey Helm (D)	Died March 3, 1919.	Seat remained vacant until next Congress.	
Texas 12th	James C. Wilson (D)	Resigned March 3, 1919, to become judge of United States District Court for the Northern District of Texas.	Seat remained vacant until next Congress	

== Committees ==
Lists of committees and their party leaders for members of the House and Senate committees can be found through the Official Congressional Directory at the bottom of this article. The directory after the pages of terms of service lists committees of the Senate, House (Standing with Subcommittees, Select and Special) and Joint and, after that, House/Senate committee assignments. On the committees section of the House and Senate in the Official Congressional Directory, the committee's members on the first row on the left side shows the chairman of the committee and on the right side shows the ranking member of the committee.

=== Senate ===
- Additional Accommodations for the Library of Congress (Select) (Chairman: Boies Penrose; Ranking Member: William J. Stone)
- Agriculture and Forestry (Chairman: Thomas P. Gore; Ranking Member: Francis E. Warren)
- Appropriations (Chairman: Thomas S. Martin; Ranking Member: Francis E. Warren)
- Audit and Control the Contingent Expenses of the Senate (Chairman: William H. Thompson; Ranking Member: Reed Smoot)
- Banking and Currency (Chairman: Robert L. Owen; Ranking Member: George P. McLean)
- Canadian Relations (Chairman: John B. Kendrick; Ranking Member: Lawrence Y. Sherman)
- Census (Chairman: Morris Sheppard; Ranking Member: Robert M. La Follette)
- Civil Service and Retrenchment (Chairman: Kenneth McKellar; Ranking Member: Albert B. Cummins)
- Claims (Chairman: Joseph T. Robinson; Ranking Member: Nathan Goff)
- Coast and Insular Survey (Chairman: Willard Saulsbury; Ranking Member: Charles E. Townsend)
- Coast Defenses (Chairman: Charles S. Thomas; Ranking Member: John W. Weeks)
- Commerce (Chairman: Duncan U. Fletcher; Ranking Member: Knute Nelson)
- Conservation of National Resources (Chairman: James K. Vardaman; Ranking Member: Asle Gronna)
- Corporations Organized in the District of Columbia (Chairman: Robert M. La Follette; Ranking Member: William J. Stone)
- Cuban Relations (Chairman: Oscar W. Underwood; Ranking Member: William A. Smith)
- Disposition of Useless Papers in the Executive Departments (Chairman: John W. Weeks; Ranking Member: Henry F. Hollis)
- District of Columbia (Chairman: John W. Smith; Ranking Member: William P. Dillingham)
- Education and Labor (Chairman: Hoke Smith; Ranking Member: William E. Borah)
- Engrossed Bills (Chairman: Francis E. Warren; Ranking Member: Furnifold M. Simmons)
- Enrolled Bills (Chairman: Henry F. Hollis; Ranking Member: Charles Curtis)
- Establish a University in the United States (Select)
- Examine the Several Branches in the Civil Service (Chairman: William A. Smith; Ranking Member: Charles A. Culberson)
- Expenditures in the Department of Agriculture (Chairman: William F. Kirby; Ranking Member: James W. Wadsworth Jr.)
- Expenditures in the Department of Commerce (Chairman: Josiah O. Wolcott; Ranking Member: Albert B. Fall)
- Expenditures in the Interior Department (Chairman: Reed Smoot; Ranking Member: Claude A. Swanson)
- Expenditures in the Department of Justice (Chairman: William E. Borah; Ranking Member: Key Pittman)
- Expenditures in the Department of Labor (Chairman: J.C.W. Beckham; Ranking Member: Nathan Goff)
- Expenditures in the Navy Department (Chairman: Asle Gronna; Ranking Member: William Hughes)
- Expenditures in the Post Office Department (Chairman: William H. King; Ranking Member: William A. Smith)
- Expenditures in the State Department (Chairman: J. Hamilton Lewis; Ranking Member: Boies Penrose)
- Expenditures in the Treasury Department (Chairman: Park Trammell; Ranking Member: Warren G. Harding)
- Expenditures in the War Department (Chairman: Charles E. Townsend; Ranking Member: Charles S. Thomas)
- Finance (Chairman: Furnifold M. Simmons; Ranking Member: Boies Penrose)
- Fisheries (Chairman: John F. Nugent; Ranking Member: Wesley L. Jones)
- Five Civilized Tribes of Indians (Chairman: Knute Nelson; Ranking Member: Benjamin R. Tillman)
- Foreign Relations (Chairman: William J. Stone; Ranking Member: Henry Cabot Lodge)
- Forest Reservations and the Protection of Game (Chairman: George P. McLean; Ranking Member: Benjamin R. Tillman)
- Geological Survey (Chairman: Albert B. Fall; Ranking Member: Ellison D. Smith)
- Immigration (Chairman: Thomas W. Hardwick; Ranking Member: William P. Dillingham)
- Indian Affairs (Chairman: Henry F. Ashurst; Ranking Member: Robert M. La Follette)
- Indian Depredations (Chairman: Miles Poindexter; Ranking Member: Claude A. Swanson)
- Industrial Expositions (Chairman: N/A; Ranking Member: Asle Gronna)
- Interoceanic Canals (Chairman: John K. Shields; Ranking Member: Frank B. Brandegee)
- Interstate Commerce (Chairman: Ellison D. Smith; Ranking Member: Albert B. Cummins)
- Investigate Trespassers upon Indian Lands (Chairman: Wesley L. Jones; Ranking Member: J.C.W. Beckham)
- Irrigation and Reclamation (Chairman: James D. Phelan; Ranking Member: Wesley L. Jones)
- Judiciary (Chairman: Charles A. Culberson; Ranking Member: Knute Nelson)
- Library (Chairman: John S. Williams; Ranking Member: Jacob H. Gallinger then John W. Weeks)
- Manufactures (Chairman: James A. Reed; Ranking Member: Robert M. La Follette)
- Military Affairs (Chairman: George E. Chamberlain; Ranking Member: Francis E. Warren)
- Mines and Mining (Chairman: Charles B. Henderson; Ranking Member: Miles Poindexter)
- Mississippi River and its Tributaries (Select) (Chairman: Albert B. Cummins; Ranking Member: John K. Shields)
- National Banks (Chairman: N/A; Ranking Member: Frank B. Kellogg)
- Naval Affairs (Chairman: Benjamin R. Tillman; Ranking Member: Boies Penrose)
- Pacific Islands and Puerto Rico (Chairman: John F. Shafroth; Ranking Member: Miles Poindexter)
- Pacific Railroads (Chairman: Frank B. Brandegee; Ranking Member: James A. Reed)
- Patents (Chairman: Ollie M. James; Ranking Member: Frank B. Brandegee)
- Pensions (Chairman: Thomas J. Walsh; Ranking Member: Porter J. McCumber)
- Philippines (Chairman: Gilbert M. Hitchcock; Ranking Member: George P. McLean)
- Post Office and Post Roads (Chairman: John H. Bankhead; Ranking Member: Boies Penrose)
- Printing (Chairman: Marcus A. Smith; Ranking Member: Reed Smoot)
- Private Land Claims (Chairman: Henry Cabot Lodge; Ranking Member: Benjamin R. Tillman)
- Privileges and Elections (Chairman: Atlee Pomerene; Ranking Member: William P. Dillingham)
- Public Buildings and Grounds (Chairman: Claude A. Swanson; Ranking Member: Francis E. Warren)
- Public Health and National Quarantine (Chairman: Joseph E. Ransdell; Ranking Member: John W. Weeks)
- Public Lands (Chairman: Henry L. Myers; Ranking Member: Reed Smoot)
- Railroads (Chairman: Peter G. Gerry; Ranking Member: George W. Norris)
- Revolutionary Claims (Chairman: Edwin S. Johnson; Ranking Member: Charles Curtis)
- Rules (Chairman: Lee S. Overman; Ranking Member: Jacob H. Gallinger then Francis E. Warren)
- Standards, Weights and Measures (Chairman: William S. Kenyon; Ranking Member: John H. Bankhead)
- Tariff Regulation (Select)
- Territories (Chairman: Key Pittman; Ranking Member: George P. McLean)
- Transportation and Sale of Meat Products (Select) (Chairman: Carroll S. Page; Ranking Member: Benjamin R. Tillman)
- Transportation Routes to the Seaboard (Chairman: Porter J. McCumber; Ranking Member: Morris Sheppard)
- University of the United States (Chairman: William P. Dillingham; Ranking Member: Willard Saulsbury)
- Washington Railway and Electrical Company (Select)
- Whole
- Woman Suffrage (Chairman: Andrieus A. Jones; Ranking Member: Wesley L. Jones)

=== House of Representatives ===
- Accounts (Chairman: Frank Park; Ranking Member: Rollin B. Sanford)
- Agriculture (Chairman: Asbury F. Lever; Ranking Member: Gilbert N. Haugen)
- Alcoholic Liquor Traffic (Chairman: Adolph J. Sabath; Ranking Member: Addison T. Smith)
- Appropriations (Chairman: Swagar Sherley; Ranking Member: Frederick H. Gillett)
- Banking and Currency (Chairman: Carter Glass; Ranking Member: Everis A. Hayes)
- Census (Chairman: Harvey Helm; Ranking Member: Charles A. Nichols)
- Claims (Chairman: Hubert D. Stephens; Ranking Member: George W. Edmonds)
- Coinage, Weights and Measures (Chairman: William A. Ashbrook; Ranking Member: Edwin E. Roberts)
- Disposition of Executive Papers (Chairman: J. Frederick C. Talbott; Ranking Member: Burton L. French)
- District of Columbia (Chairman: Ben Johnson; Ranking Member: William J. Cary)
- Education (Chairman: William J. Sears; Ranking Member: Caleb Powers)
- Election of the President, Vice President and Representatives in Congress (Chairman: William W. Rucker; Ranking Member: Carl E. Mapes)
- Elections No.#1 (Chairman: Riley J. Wilson; Ranking Member: Merrill Moores)
- Elections No.#2 (Chairman: James A. Hamill; Ranking Member: John Jacob Rogers)
- Elections No.#3 (Chairman: Walter A. Watson; Ranking Member: Cassius C. Dowell)
- Enrolled Bills (Chairman: Ladislas Lazaro; Ranking Member: John R. Ramsey)
- Expenditures in the Agriculture Department (Chairman: Robert L. Doughton; Ranking Member: Cassius C. Dowell)
- Expenditures in the Commerce Department (Chairman: Robert Crosser; Ranking Member: Thomas S. Williams)
- Expenditures in the Interior Department (Chairman: William W. Hastings; Ranking Member: Aaron S. Kreider)
- Expenditures in the Justice Department (Chairman: William B. Walton; Ranking Member: Stephen G. Porter)
- Expenditures in the Labor Department (Chairman: Christopher D. Sullivan; Ranking Member: Niels Juul)
- Expenditures in the Navy Department (Chairman: Rufus Hardy; Ranking Member: George E. Foss)
- Expenditures in the Post Office Department (Chairman: Edward Keating; Ranking Member: Harry H. Pratt)
- Expenditures in the State Department (Chairman: Courtney W. Hamlin; Ranking Member: George H. Tinkham)
- Expenditures in the Treasury Department (Chairman: Charles O. Lobeck; Ranking Member: Henry W. Temple)
- Expenditures in the War Department (Chairman: Peter J. Dooling; Ranking Member: Luther W. Mott)
- Expenditures on Public Buildings (Chairman: James V. McClintic; Ranking Member: Edward E. Robbins then Oscar E. Bland)
- Flood Control (Chairman: Benjamin G. Humphreys; Ranking Member: William A. Rodenberg)
- Foreign Affairs (Chairman: Henry D. Flood; Ranking Member: Henry A. Cooper)
- Immigration and Naturalization (Chairman: John L. Burnett; Ranking Member: Everis A. Hayes)
- Indian Affairs (Chairman: Charles D. Carter; Ranking Member: Philip P. Campbell)
- Industrial Arts and Expositions (Chairman: James E. Cantrill; Ranking Member: Frank P. Woods)
- Insular Affairs (Chairman: Finis J. Garrett; Ranking Member: Horace M. Towner)
- Interstate and Foreign Commerce (Chairman: Thetus W. Sims; Ranking Member: John J. Esch)
- Invalid Pensions (Chairman: Isaac R. Sherwood; Ranking Member: John W. Langley)
- Investigate Conditions Interfering with Interstate Commerce between the States of Illinois and Missouri (Select) (Chairman: N/A; Ranking Member: N/A)
- Irrigation of Arid Lands (Chairman: Edward T. Taylor; Ranking Member: Moses P. Kinkaid)
- Judiciary (Chairman: Edwin Y. Webb; Ranking Member: Andrew J. Volstead)
- Labor (Chairman: James P. Maher; Ranking Member: John M.C. Smith)
- Library (Chairman: James L. Slayden; Ranking Member: Edward W. Gray)
- Merchant Marine and Fisheries (Chairman: Joshua W. Alexander; Ranking Member: William S. Greene)
- Mileage (Chairman: Clarence C. Dill; Ranking Member: John A. Elston)
- Military Affairs (Chairman: S. Hubert Dent; Ranking Member: Julius Kahn)
- Mines and Mining (Chairman: Martin D. Foster; Ranking Member: Mahlon M. Garland)
- Naval Affairs (Chairman: Lemuel P. Padgett; Ranking Member: Thomas S. Butler)
- Patents (Chairman: Charles B. Smith; Ranking Member: John I. Nolan)
- Pensions (Chairman: John A. Key; Ranking Member: Sam R. Sells)
- Post Office and Post Roads (Chairman: John A. Moon; Ranking Member: Halvor Steenerson)
- Printing (Chairman: Henry A. Barnhart; Ranking Member: Edgar R. Kiess)
- Public Buildings and Grounds (Chairman: Frank Clark; Ranking Member: Richard W. Austin)
- Public Lands (Chairman: Scott Ferris; Ranking Member: Irvine L. Lenroot)
- Railways and Canals (Chairman: Clement Brumbaugh; Ranking Member: William L. La Follette)
- Reform in the Civil Service (Chairman: Hannibal L. Godwin; Ranking Member: Frederick R. Lehlbach)
- Revision of Laws (Chairman: John T. Watkins; Ranking Member: Merrill Moores)
- Rivers and Harbors (Chairman: John H. Small; Ranking Member: Charles A. Kennedy)
- Roads (Chairman: Dorsey W. Shackleford; Ranking Member: Thomas B. Dunn)
- Rules (Chairman: Edward W. Pou; Ranking Member: Philip P. Campbell)
- Standards of Official Conduct
- Territories (Chairman: William C. Houston; Ranking Member: Albert Johnson)
- War Claims (Chairman: Alexander W. Gregg; Ranking Member: Benjamin K. Focht)
- Water Power (Special) (Chairman: Thetus W. Sims; Ranking Member: N/A)
- Ways and Means (Chairman: Claude Kitchin; Ranking Member: Joseph W. Fordney)
- Woman Suffrage (Chairman: John E. Raker; Ranking Member: Jeannette Rankin)
- Whole

=== Joint committees ===
- Conditions of Indian Tribes (Special)
- Disposition of (Useless) Executive Papers
- Interstate Commerce (Chairman: Sen. Ellison D. Smith)
- The Library (Chairman: Sen. John Sharp Williams)
- Postal Salaries
- Printing (Chairman: Sen. Duncan U. Fletcher)
- Reclassification of Salaries

== Caucuses ==
- Democratic (House)
- Democratic (Senate)

== Employees ==
=== Legislative branch agency directors ===
- Architect of the Capitol: Elliott Woods
- Librarian of Congress: Herbert Putnam
- Public Printer of the United States: Cornelius Ford

=== Senate ===
- Chaplain: F.J. Prettyman (Methodist)
- Secretary: James M. Baker
- Librarian: Edward C. Goodwin
- Sergeant at Arms: Charles P. Higgins

=== House of Representatives ===
- Chaplain: Henry N. Couden (Universalist)
- Clerk: South Trimble
- Doorkeeper: Joseph J. Sinnott
- Postmaster: William M. Dunbar
- Clerk at the Speaker's Table: Bennett C. Clark
  - Clarence A. Cannon
- Reading Clerks: Patrick Joseph Haltigan (D) and H. Martin Williams (R)
- Sergeant at Arms: Robert B. Gordon

== See also ==
- 1916 United States elections (elections leading to this Congress)
  - 1916 United States presidential election
  - 1916 United States Senate elections
  - 1916 United States House of Representatives elections
- 1918 United States elections (elections during this Congress, leading to the next Congress)
  - 1918 United States Senate elections
  - 1918 United States House of Representatives elections
