= George M. Beakes =

American politician

George Mortimer Beakes (January 2, 1831 – June 15, 1900) was an American physician, surgeon, and politician from New York.

== Life ==
Beakes was born on January 2, 1831, in Middletown, New York. He was the youngest of 11 children.

Beakes attended Walkill Academy, the University of Michigan, and Albany Medical College. He graduated from the latter in 1856; he began practicing medicine in Bergen Point, New Jersey. In 1857, he moved to Burlingham, New York, where he lived until 1861.

When the Civil War began, Beakes enlisted and was appointed Assistant Surgeon for the 1st Regiment New York Volunteer Cavalry, where he served in the Army of the Potomac. He was later promoted to Surgeon for the 141st New York Volunteer Infantry, where he served in the Army of the Cumberland and with General Sherman until the war's end. He took part in various battles in the War. In 1868, he was a delegate to the New York Soldiers' and Sailors' Convention. In 1864, General Thomas assigned him to future President Benjamin Harrison's Brigade, where he served as Surgeon in Chief. He participated in the Grand Review of the Armies in 1865, and was honorably discharged shortly afterwards.

Beakes returned to Burlingham after he was discharged, but in 1870 he moved to Bloomingburg. During both of President Cleveland's terms, he was on the board of United States Pension examining surgeons for his congressional district.

In 1890, Beakes was elected to the New York State Assembly as a Democrat, representing Sullivan County. He served in the Assembly in 1891 and 1892.

Beakes married Elizabeth Bull in 1858. Their children were Michigan congressman Samuel Willard, Robert Osborn, and Gertrude.

Beakes died on June 15, 1900, at home in Bloomingburg. He was buried in the Bloomingburg Rural Cemetery.

New York State Assembly
Preceded by William R. Rose	New York State Assembly; Sullivan County; 1891-1892	Succeeded by Uriah S. Messiter
