= Webb–Pomerene Act =

- Other short titles: Export Trade Act
- Long title: An Act To promote export trade, and for other purposes.
- Enacted by: the 65th United States Congress
- Effective: April 10, 1918

Citations
- Statutes at Large: USS 40 (516)

Codification
- Acts amended: Clayton Antitrust Act of 1914

Legislative history
- Introduced in the House as H.R. 2316 by Edwin Y. Webb (D-NC) on April 12, 1917; Passed the House on June 13, 1917 (242–29); Passed the Senate on December 12, 1917 (51–11); Reported by the joint conference committee on April 4, 1918; agreed to by the House on April 6, 1918 and by the Senate on April 6, 1918

The Webb–Pomerene Act was a law which came into effect on April 10, 1918 that exempted certain exporters' associations from certain antitrust regulations. Sponsored by Rep. Edwin Y. Webb (D) of North Carolina and Sen. Atlee Pomerene (D) of Ohio, the act granted immunity from antitrust regulation to companies that combined to operate the export trade that was essential to the war effort. The law was intended to promote American export trade.

The act was important because it granted exemptions from the Clayton Antitrust Act of 1914. Many large conglomerates that had previously been subject to Federal antitrust investigations were now free to continue "business as usual" because they "aided" the war effort. Webb-Pomerene exemptions lasted well into the 1920s as the Federal Trade Commission granted stays of investigation for those companies that initially qualified for exemption under the 1918 act.
