= Samuel Beakes =

American politician

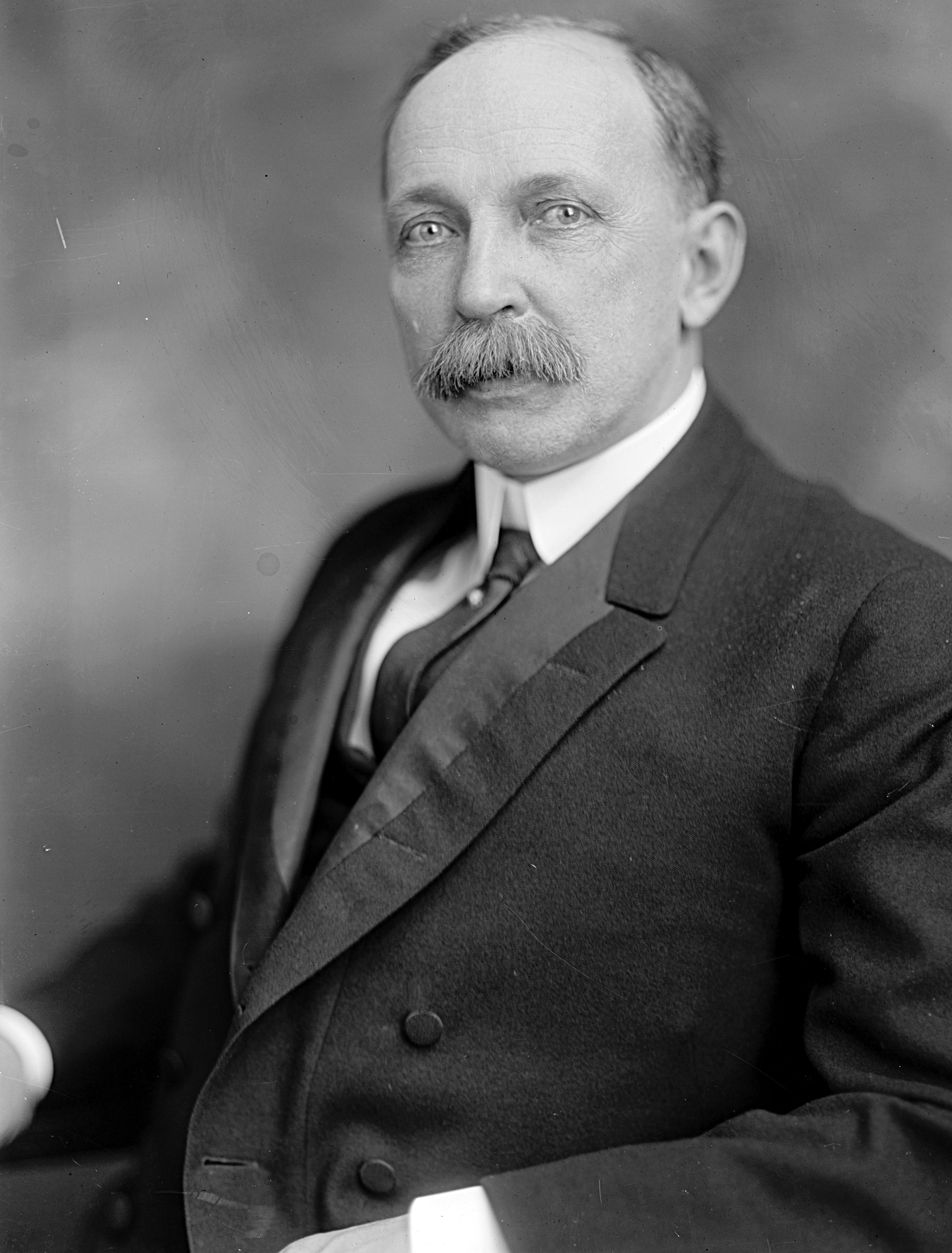
- Samuel Beakes

Member of the U.S. House of Representatives from Michigan's 2nd district
- In office December 13, 1917 – March 3, 1919
- Preceded by: Mark R. Bacon
- Succeeded by: Earl C. Michener
- In office March 4, 1913 – March 3, 1917
- Preceded by: William Wedemeyer
- Succeeded by: Mark R. Bacon

Personal details
- Born: January 11, 1861 Sullivan County, New York, U.S.
- Died: February 9, 1927 (aged 66) Washington, D.C., U.S.
- Party: Democratic
- Education: University of Michigan

Samuel Willard Beakes (January 11, 1861 – February 9, 1927) was a politician from the U.S. state of Michigan.

== Life and career ==
Beakes was born in Sullivan County, New York to parents Elizabeth Bull and George M. Beakes. He attended Wallkill Academy in Middletown, New York. Beakes graduated from the law department of the University of Michigan at Ann Arbor in 1883, was admitted to the bar the same year, and commenced practice in Westerville, Ohio.

He was editor and proprietor of the Westerville Review in 1884, of the Adrian, Michigan Daily Record 1884–1886, and of the Ann Arbor Argus 1886–1905.

He was also mayor of Ann Arbor 1888–1890, postmaster of Ann Arbor 1894–1898, city treasurer 1891-1893 and 1903–1905, and city assessor 1906–1913. He was a delegate to the Democratic National Convention at St. Louis in 1916.

Beakes was elected as a Democrat from Michigan's 2nd District to the United States House of Representatives for the Sixty-third and Sixty-fourth Congresses, serving from March 4, 1913 to March 3, 1917.

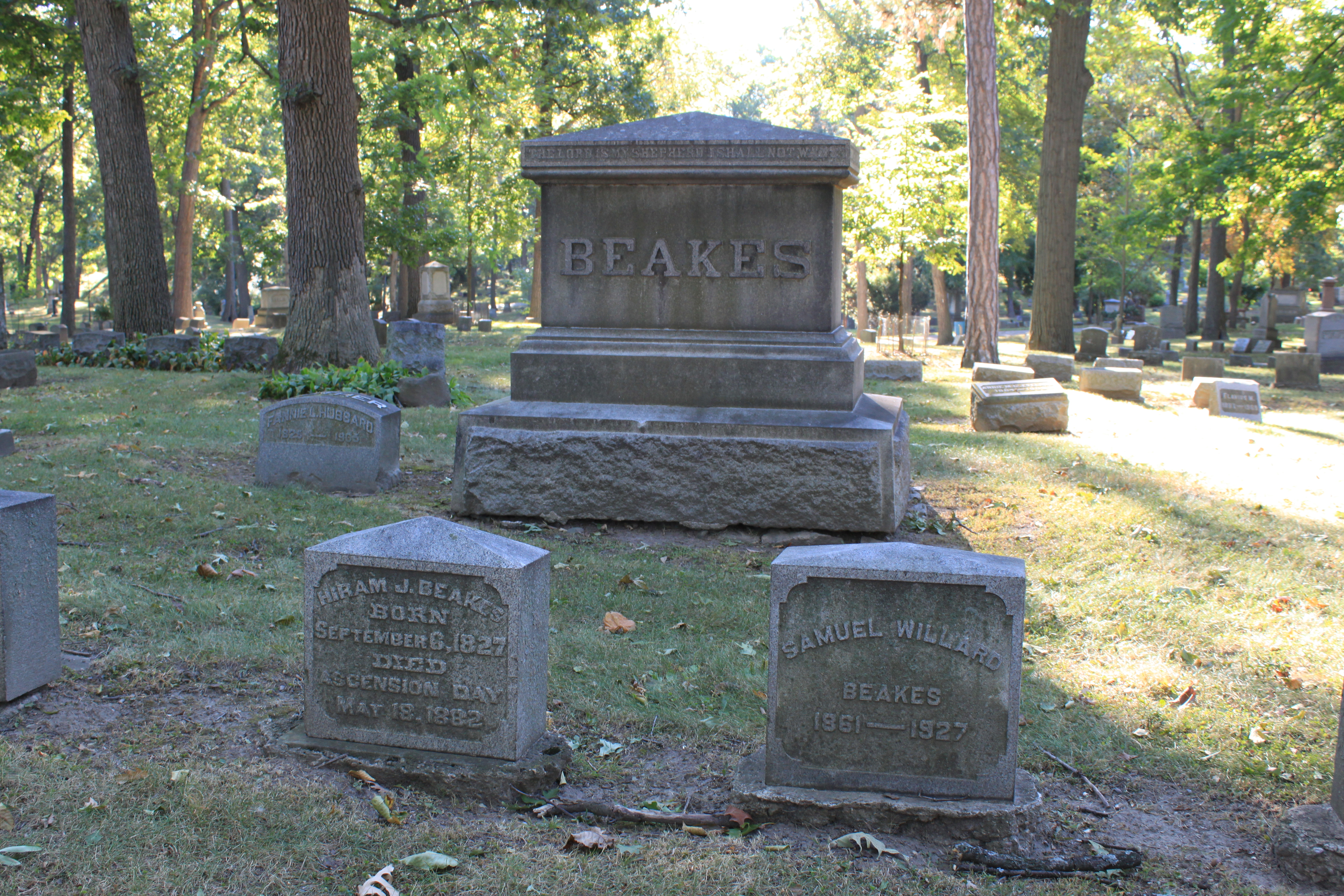
Beakes grave

He successfully contested the election of Mark R. Bacon to the Sixty-fifth Congress and served from December 13, 1917, to March 3, 1919. He was defeated by Earl C. Michener for reelection in 1918 to the Sixty-sixth Congress.

After his service in Congress, he resided in Washington, D.C. and was assistant chief of the industrial cooperation service of the United States Department of Commerce from April to July 1919 and a staff member of the United States Veterans' Bureau from 1919 until his death in Washington, D.C., aged 66.

He is buried in Forest Hill Cemetery in Ann Arbor, Michigan.

Political offices
Preceded by John Robison	Mayor of Ann Arbor, Michigan; 1888–1890	Succeeded by Charles H. Manly
U.S. House of Representatives
Preceded by William Wedemeyer	United States Representative for the 2nd congressional district of Michigan; March 4, 1913–March 3, 1917	Succeeded by Mark R. Bacon
Preceded by Mark R. Bacon	United States Representative for the 2nd congressional district of Michigan; December 13, 1917–March 3, 1919	Succeeded by Earl C. Michener
