= Alien Naturalization Act =

- Long title: An Act To amend the naturalization laws and to repeal certain sections of the Revised Statutes of the United States and other laws relating to naturalization, and for other purposes
- Enacted by: the 65th United States Congress
- Effective: May 9, 1918

Citations
- Statutes at Large: 40 Stat. 542

The Alien Naturalization Act, Sess. 2, ch. 69, 40 Stat. 542, was a May 9, 1918 Act of the 65th United States Congress.

More than 192,000 aliens were naturalized between May 9, 1918-June 30, 1919, under this act. It allowed aliens that were serving in the U.S. armed forces during "the present war" to file petitions for naturalization without making declarations of intent or proving 5 years' residence (requirements at the time).
