= United States House Special Committee on Water Power =

The Special Committee on Water Power was a special committee of the U.S. House of Representatives during the 65th and 66th Congresses. It was established on January 11, 1918.

== Jurisdiction ==
The special committee was assigned jurisdiction over all bills and resolutions involving development or utilization of water power within the United States

== History ==
For several years, Congress had failed in its attempts to pass legislation authorizing the building of dams on navigable streams. At the time, the Secretaries of War, Interior, and Agriculture all had authority over some aspect of the issue. The three secretaries joined in drafting a water power bill for consideration by Congress. In the House, jurisdiction over the bill was split. The Committee on Interstate and Foreign Commerce had jurisdiction over bills regarding construction of bridges and dams over navigable waters within the several states, the Committee on Public Lands had jurisdiction over dams on public lands, and the Committee on Agriculture had jurisdiction over those on forest reserves. To prevent the Secretaries' bill from being fragmented among committees, the special committee was created, drawing its members from the three standing committees. The committee was renewed in the 66th Congress (1919–21) and expired in 1921.
