= Charles E. Townsend =

American politician (1856–1924)

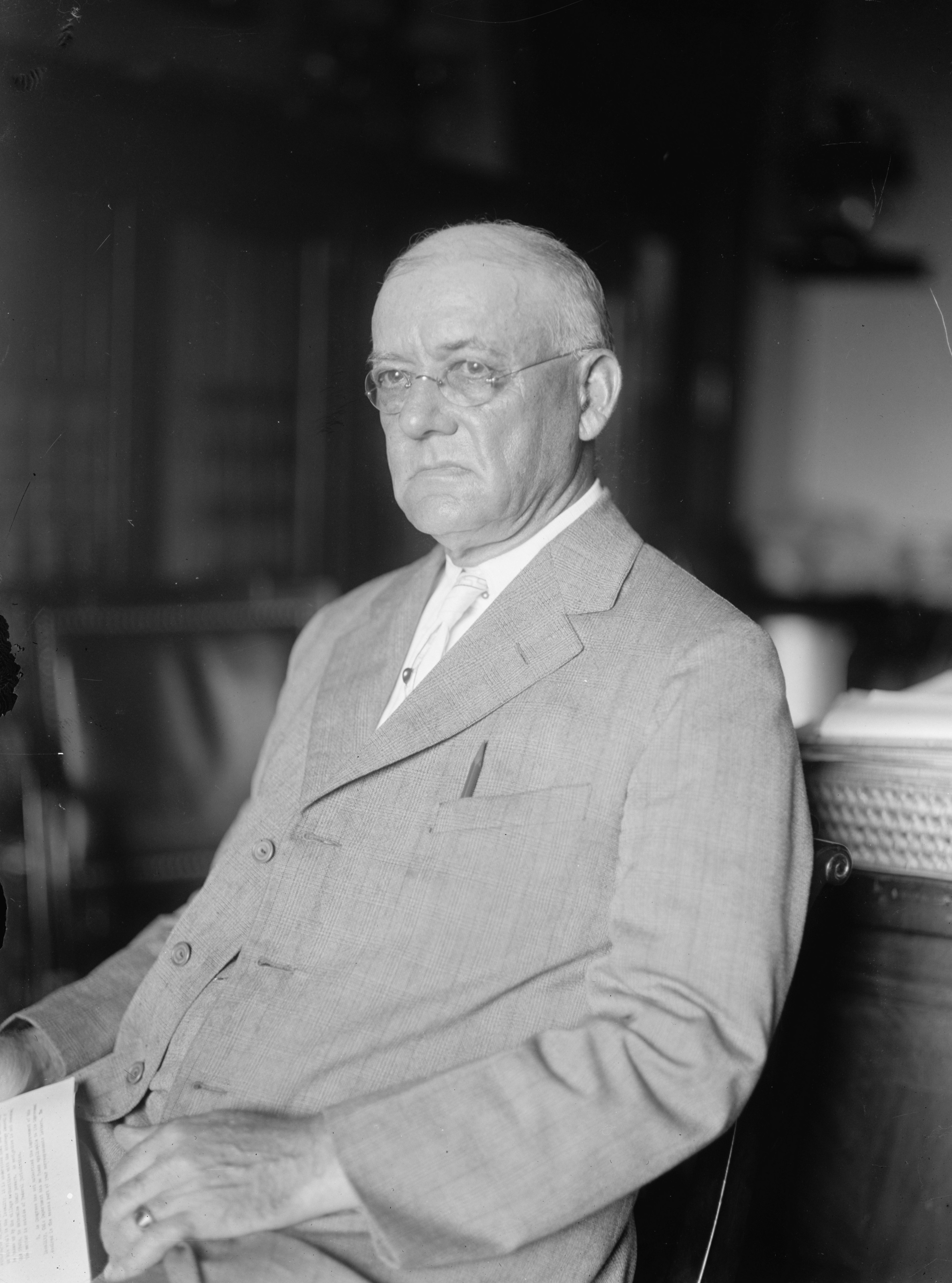
- Townsend in 1921

United States Senator from Michigan
- In office March 4, 1911 – March 3, 1923
- Preceded by: Julius C. Burrows
- Succeeded by: Woodbridge N. Ferris

Member of the U.S. House of Representatives from Michigan's 2nd district
- In office March 4, 1903 – March 3, 1911
- Preceded by: Henry C. Smith
- Succeeded by: William Wedemeyer

Personal details
- Born: August 15, 1856 Concord, Michigan
- Died: August 3, 1924 (aged 67) Jackson, Michigan
- Party: Republican
- Education: University of Michigan

Charles Elroy Townsend (August 15, 1856 – August 3, 1924) was an American lawyer who served as both a U.S. representative and U.S. senator from the state of Michigan. He served in the United States Congress from 1903 to 1923.

== Early life and career ==
Townsend was born on August 15. 1856, near Concord, Michigan and attended the common schools in Concord and Jackson and the University of Michigan at Ann Arbor. He taught school at Concord 1881-1886 and was Jackson County Register of Deeds 1886–1897. He studied law and was admitted to the bar in 1895 and commenced practice in Jackson.

== Tenure in Congress ==
Townsend was elected as a Republican to the United States House of Representatives for the Fifty-eighth and for the three succeeding Congresses, serving from March 4, 1903, to March 3, 1911.

He was elected to the United States Senate in 1910 and was reelected in 1916, serving from March 4, 1911, to March 3, 1923. In 1914, and while holding the office of Senator, he was on the Central Committee of the First National Conference on Race Betterment, a conference on eugenics held at the Battle Creek Sanatorium. He was an unsuccessful candidate for reelection in 1922. He was chairman of the U.S. Senate Committee on Coast and Insular Survey in the Sixty-second Congress, the U.S. Senate Committee on Expenditures in the War Department in the Sixty-fifth Congress, and the U.S. Senate Committee on Post Office and Post Roads in the Sixty-sixth and Sixty-seventh Congresses.

== Career after Congress ==
Townsend was appointed in 1923 as a member of the International Joint Commission created to regulate the use of the boundary waters between the United States and Canada, in which capacity he served until his death on August 3, 1924, in Jackson, Michigan. He is interred in Maple Grove Cemetery, in Concord.

== Bibliography ==
- Schlup, Peonard. "Party Loyalist: Charles E. Townsend and the Vice-Presidential Election of 1912." Research Journal of Philosophy & Social Sciences (1992): 61–70.
- United States Congress. "Charles E. Townsend (id: T000330)". Biographical Directory of the United States Congress.

Party political offices
First	Republican nominee for U.S. Senator from Michigan (Class 1); 1916, 1922	Succeeded by Arthur Vandenberg
U.S. House of Representatives
Preceded by Henry C. Smith	United States Representative for the 2nd congressional district of Michigan; 1903–1911	Succeeded by William Wedemeyer
U.S. Senate
Preceded by Julius C. Burrows	U.S. Senator (Class 1) from Michigan; 1911–1923	Succeeded by Woodbridge N. Ferris
