= Wheat Price Guarantee Act =

United States federal law

- Long title: An Act to enable the President to carry out the price guaranties made to producers of wheat of the crops of nineteen hundred and eighteen and nineteen hundred and nineteen and to protect the United States against undue enhancement of its liabilities thereunder.
- Nicknames: Wheat Stabilization Act of 1919
- Enacted by: the 65th United States Congress
- Effective: March 4, 1919

Citations
- Public law: Pub. L. 65–348
- Statutes at Large: 40 Stat. 1348

Legislative history
- Introduced in the House as H.R. 15796 by Asbury Francis Lever (D-SC); Passed the House on February 22, 1919 (278-14); Signed into law by President Woodrow Wilson on March 4, 1919

The Wheat Price Guarantee Act was a 1919 bill passed by Congress that gave the government the power to regulate the price of wheat.

== Background ==
At the start of the first World War, the US government passed the Lever [Food] Act (1917). This was done to conserve the food supply and increase its production in order to aid the efforts in Europe during the war. This alone helped food industries, including wheat, to take off in the United States. Sponsored by Democrat Asbury F. Lever, the Lever Act was very controversial because it gave the president authority to make the country limit their use of agricultural products. In July 1918, the Grain Corporation (a part of the US Food Administration) took on contracts with allied governments, promising to provide as much wheat up to 200 million bushels to the Allied powers. Soon after this, the war ended, and the United States had a decision to make if they were going to honor the wheat prices they promised to farmers before the war ended.

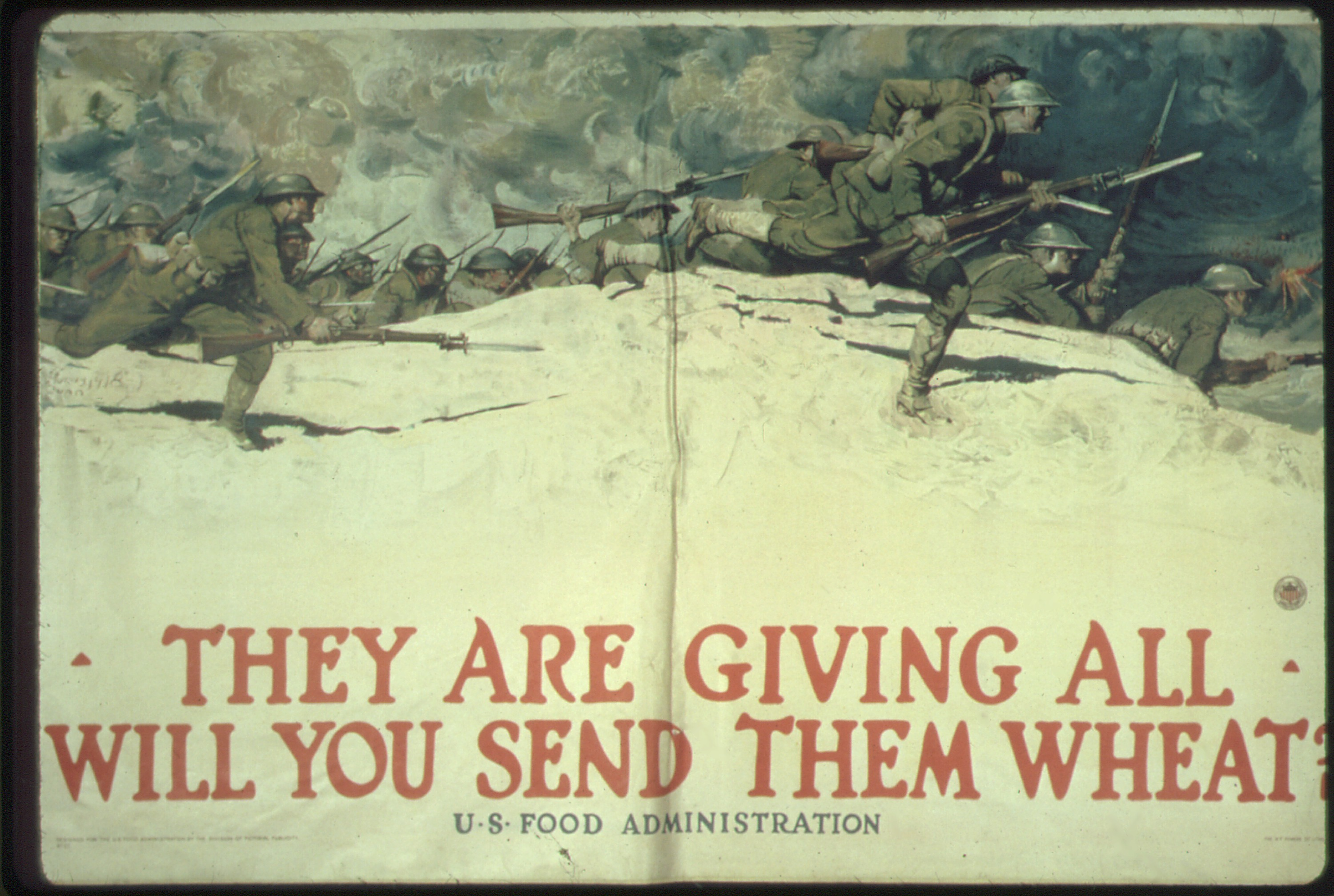
The US Food Administration used advertisements like this during World War I to urge people to conserve food in order to have enough for the soldiers. Despite the wheat industry being as mobilized as it was, there was always a constant demand for more to aid the war effort.

During World War I, the wheat industry was mobilized, but following the end of it the demand started to decline, which hurt the still-mobilized agricultural industry. This resulted in the drafting of the Wheat Price Guarantee Act. Despite strong opposition from the Republican Party, the 65th Congress approved this and it was signed into law by Woodrow Wilson. The bill appropriated $1,000,000,000 in funds to keep wheat prices constant through the 1919-1920 crop year. Similar to the Lever Act, the passage of this act allowed the US Government (specifically the president) to monitor wheat prices in order to guarantee farmers profits based on what they had expected them to be if the war had continued. The minimum price per bushel was set to $2.26, which is known as a guaranteed price scheme. The Wheat Price Guarantee Act was intended to give the agricultural industry time to adjust to the war being over. Simply put, this act was a temporary continuation of the Lever [Food] Act of 1917. The Wheat Price Guarantee Act would officially expire on June 1, 1920. After this, most farmers fell into debt and this laid some of the roots that would lead to the Great Depression in the 1930s. Unlike the rest of the country, farmers felt the effects of the depression about 10–15 years before it would reach its peak.

=== Wheat Prices ===
The passage of the bill required the US to buy bushels of wheat for at least $2.26 each. Following the expiration of the bill in 1920, prices plummeted back to their typical range of $0.50–$1.50 per bushel. Having lost most of the business they had during the war, the wheat industry took a big hit. In 1931 during the Great Depression, it would hit a low of just $0.33 per bushel.

=== The Gronna Bill ===
Republican Senator Asle Gronna attempted to reverse all guarantees within this act with the Gronna Bill. Many state representatives opposed this, mostly from the Democratic Party (who had a majority in the Senate), choosing to back the farmers with a 100% guarantee on their profits. The bill did not end up passing in the end.
