= Mark R. Bacon =

American politician (1852–1941)

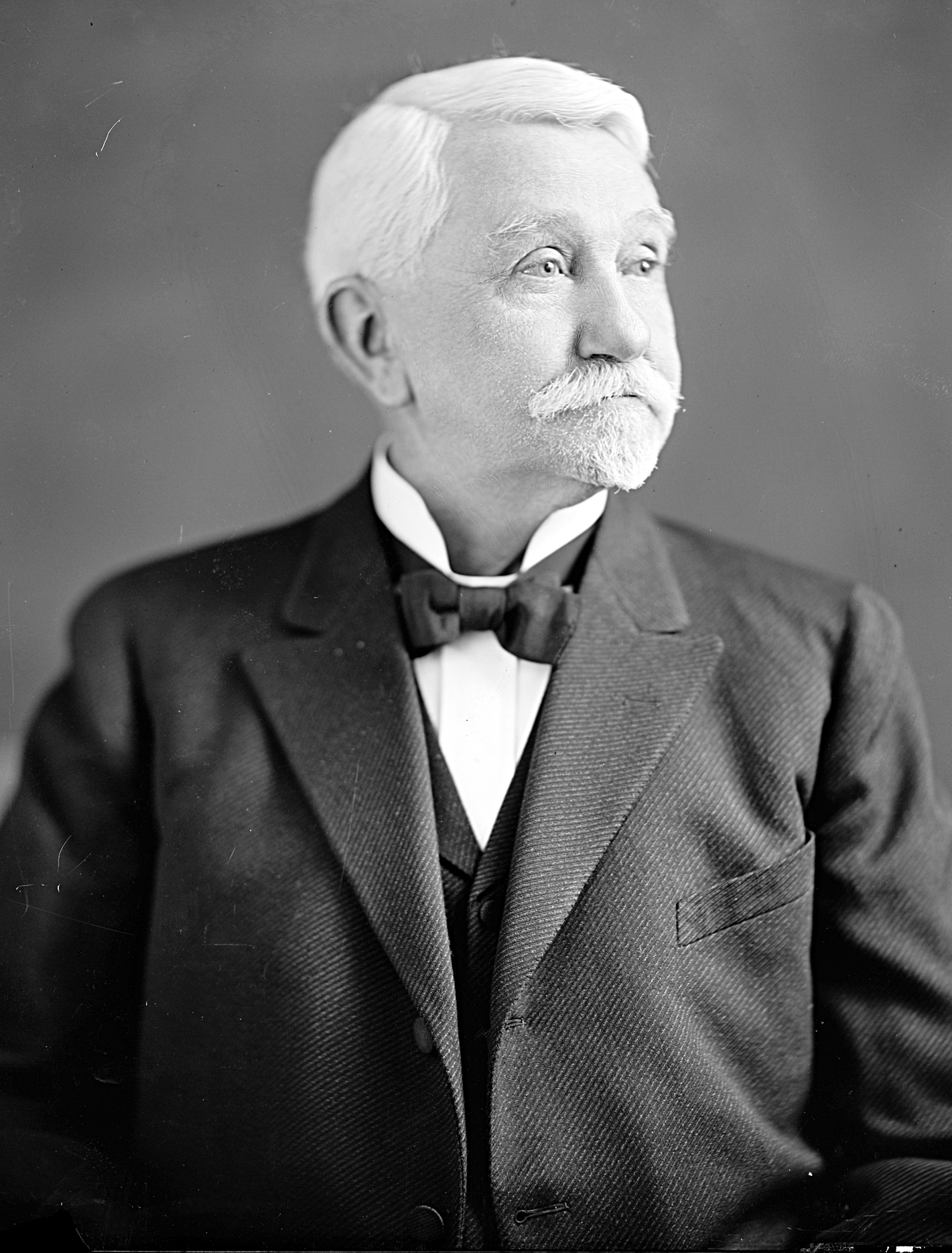
- Harris & Ewing Photo Collection, Library of Congress

Member of the U.S. House of Representatives from Michigan's 2nd district
- In office March 4, 1917 – December 13, 1917
- Preceded by: Samuel Beakes
- Succeeded by: Samuel Beakes

Personal details
- Born: February 29, 1852 Phillipstown, Illinois, U.S.
- Died: August 20, 1941 (aged 89) Pasadena, California, U.S.
- Resting place: San Gabriel Cemetery, San Gabriel, California, U.S.
- Party: Republican

Mark Reeves Bacon (February 29, 1852 – August 20, 1941) was a lawyer and politician from the U.S. state of Michigan.

Bacon was born in Phillipstown, Illinois, and attended the public schools there. He taught school at the Academy in Bolivar, Missouri in 1871. He studied law, was admitted to the bar on July 4, 1876, and commenced practice in Fairfield, Illinois. He was the city attorney of Fairfield and a delegate to several State conventions.

== Career ==
He moved to Orlando, Florida, in 1882 and to Jacksonville, Florida, in 1886 and engaged in the abstract business. He moved to Wyandotte, Michigan, in 1895 and became associated with the Michigan Alkali Company through his marriage to Mary Ford, the granddaughter of founder Jean-Baptiste Ford (and the daughter of Edward Ford, founder of Edward Ford Plate Glass Company, subsequently part of Libbey-Owens Ford Glass and the Pilkington).

Bacon presented credentials as a Republican Member-elect from Michigan's 2nd congressional district to the United States House of Representatives for the Sixty-fifth Congress. He served from March 4 until December 13, 1917, when he was succeeded by Democrat Samuel W. Beakes, who successfully contested the election. On April 5, 1917, he was one of the 50 representatives who voted against declaring war on Germany. He was not a candidate for renomination in 1918, retiring to Wyandotte, Michigan.

== Death ==
He died at his winter home in Pasadena, California, aged 89, and is interred at San Gabriel Cemetery, San Gabriel, California.

U.S. House of Representatives
Preceded by Samuel Beakes	United States Representative for the 2nd congressional district of Michigan; March 4, 1917– December 13, 1917	Succeeded by Samuel Beakes
