= 1922 United States Senate election in Michigan =

- November 7, 1922
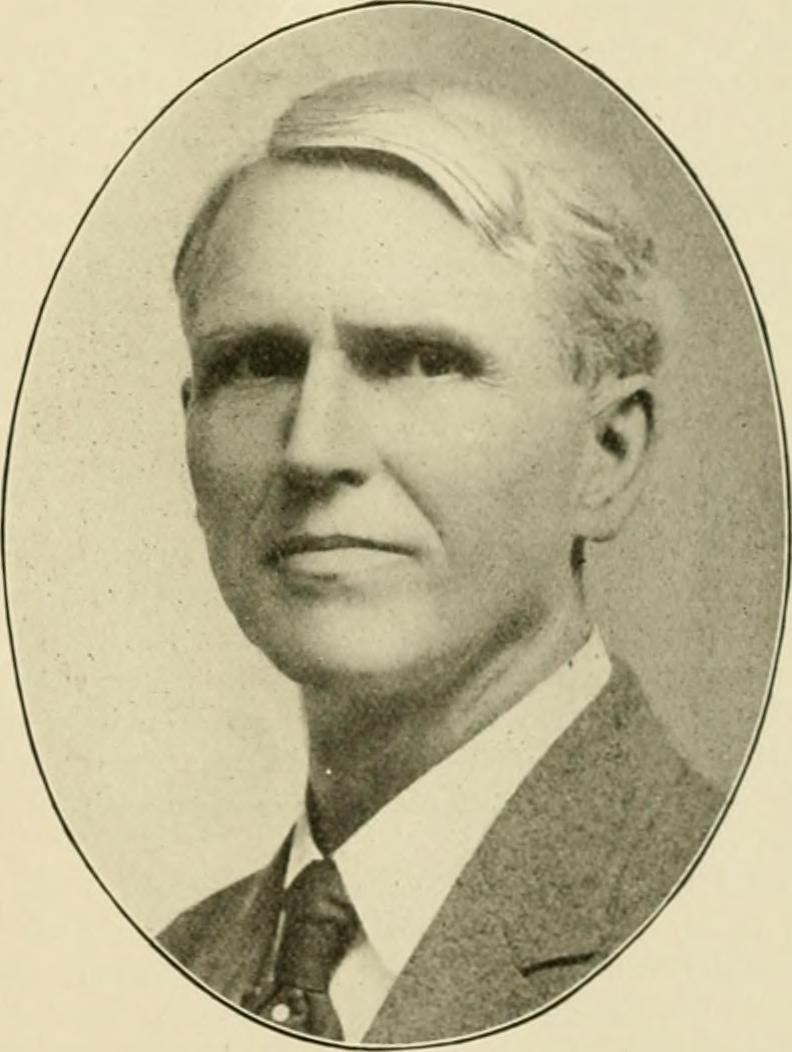

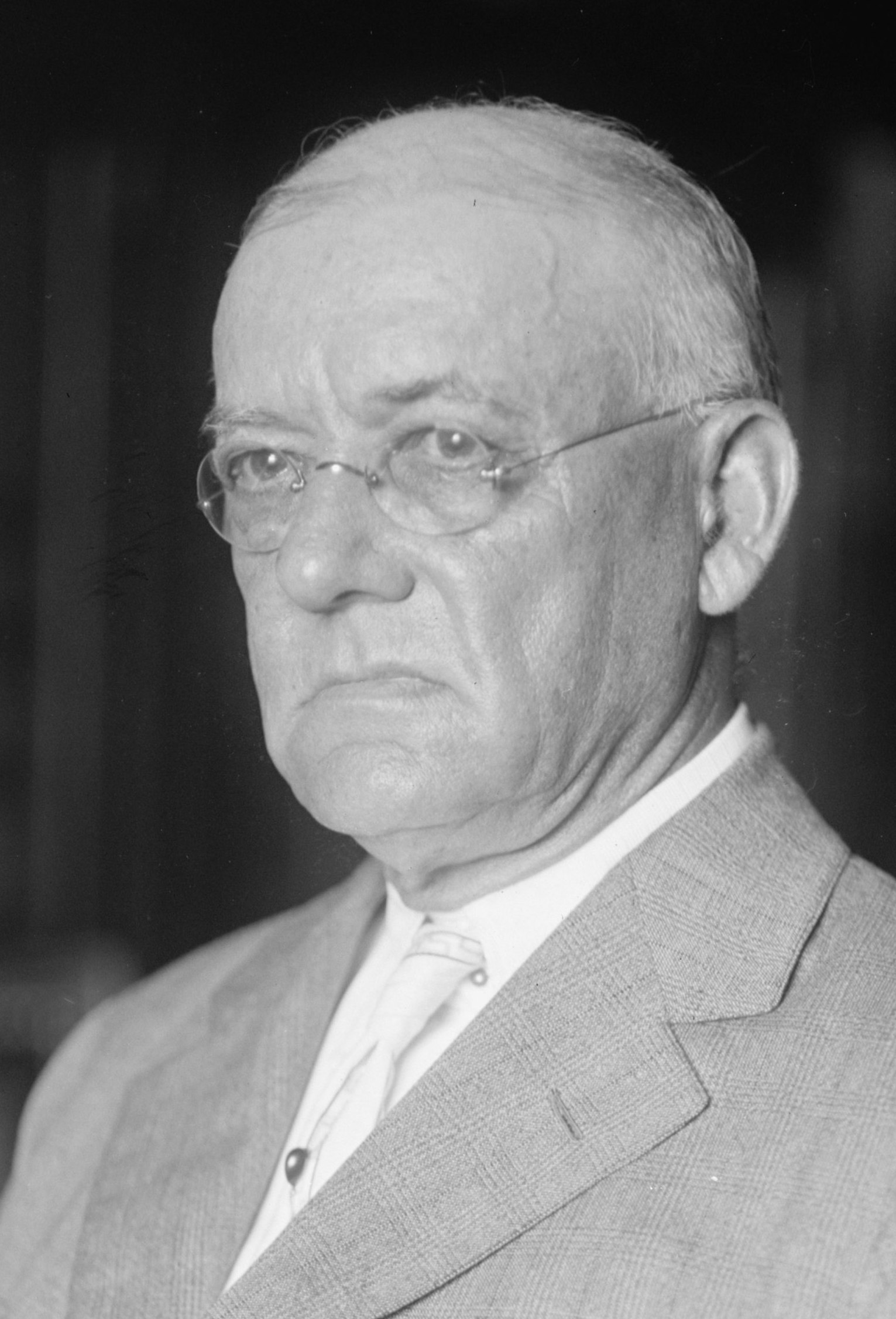
Nominee	Woodbridge N. Ferris	Charles E. Townsend
Party	Democratic	Republican
Popular vote	294,932	281,843
Percentage	50.59%	48.35%
- County results Ferris: 40–50% 50–60% 60–70% Townsend: 40–50% 50–60% 60–70% 70–80% 80–90%
U.S. senator before election
Charles E. Townsend
Republican
Elected U.S. Senator
Woodbridge N. Ferris
Democratic

The 1922 United States Senate election in Michigan was held on November 7, 1922. Incumbent Republican Senator Charles E. Townsend ran for re-election to a third term in office, but was defeated by Democratic former Governor Woodbridge N. Ferris. Ferris was the first Democrat popularly elected to represent Michigan in the Senate, as Democrats last won a Senate seat in 1859, and last held this seat in 1857.

== General election ==
=== Candidates ===
- Woodbridge N. Ferris, former Governor of Michigan (1913–17) (Democratic)
- William L. Kreighoff (Socialist)
- Frank E. Titus (Prohibition)
- Charles E. Townsend, incumbent Senator since 1911 (Republican)

=== Results ===
1922 U.S. Senate election in Michigan
Party	Candidate	Votes	%	±%
Democratic	Woodbridge N. Ferris	294,932	50.59%	▲10.74
Republican	Charles E. Townsend (incumbent)	281,843	48.35%	▼7.99
Socialist	William L. Kreighoff	4,249	0.73%	▼2.68
Prohibition	Frank E. Titus	1,936	0.33%	▼0.84
Total votes		582,960	100.00%	N/A
Democratic gain from Republican				

== See also ==
- 1922 United States Senate elections
