= 1916 United States Senate election in Michigan =

- November 7, 1916
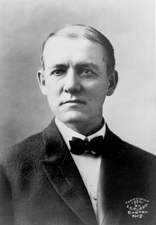

Nominee	Charles E. Townsend	Lawrence Price
Party	Republican	Democratic
Popular vote	364,657	257,954
Percentage	56.34%	39.85%
- County results Townsend: 40–50% 50–60% 60–70% 70–80% Price: 40–50%
U.S. senator before election
Charles E. Townsend
Republican
Elected U.S. Senator
Charles E. Townsend
Republican

The 1916 United States Senate election in Michigan was held on November 7, 1916.

Incumbent Republican Senator Charles E. Townsend was re-elected to a second term in office over Democrat Lawrence Price.

This was the first election in Michigan held after the passage of the Seventeenth Amendment to the United States Constitution, which required all senators to be elected by direct popular vote.

== General election ==
=== Candidates ===
- Edward O. Foss (Socialist)
- John Y. Johnston (Prohibition)
- Lawrence Price (Democratic)
- Herman Richter (Socialist Labor)
- Charles E. Townsend, incumbent senator since 1911 (Republican)

=== Results ===
1916 U.S. Senate election in Michigan
Party	Candidate	Votes	%
Republican	Charles E. Townsend (incumbent)	364,657	56.34%
Democratic	Lawrence Price	257,954	39.85%
Socialist	Edward O. Foss	15,614	2.41%
Prohibition	John Y. Johnston	7,569	1.17%
Socialist Labor	Herman Richter	924	0.14%
Independent	Henry Ford (write-in)	566	0.09%
Total votes		677,284	100.00%
Republican hold			

== See also ==
- 1916 United States Senate elections
