= William Wedemeyer =

American politician

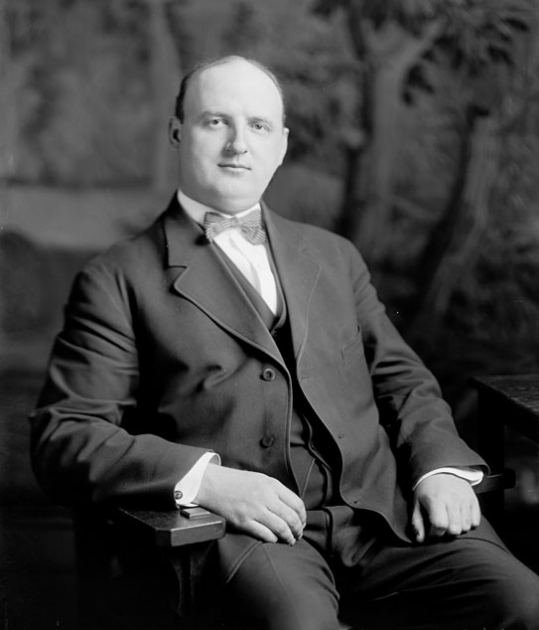
- Portrait of William Wedemeyer

Member of the U.S. House of Representatives from Michigan's 2nd district
- In office March 4, 1911 – January 2, 1913
- Preceded by: Henry C. Smith
- Succeeded by: Samuel Beakes

Personal details
- Born: March 22, 1873 Lima Township, Michigan, U.S.
- Died: January 2, 1913 (aged 39) Colón, Panama
- Party: Republican
- Education: University of Michigan

William Walter Wedemeyer (March 22, 1873 – January 2, 1913) was a politician from the U.S. state of Michigan.

Wedemeyer was born near Lima Township in Washtenaw County, Michigan. He attended the district schools and Ann Arbor High School. He graduated from the law department of the University of Michigan at Ann Arbor in 1895. He was a member of the board of school examiners from 1894 to 1895. He was admitted to the bar in 1895 and served as county commissioner of schools from 1895 to 1897. He served as deputy commissioner of railroads for Michigan from 1897 to 1899 and commenced the practice of law at Ann Arbor in 1899.

Wedemeyer was chairman of the Republican State convention in 1903. He was American consul at Georgetown, British Guiana during the summer of 1905. He was a member of the Republican State central committee from 1906 to 1910. In 1910, he was elected as a Republican from Michigan's 2nd congressional district to the 62nd United States Congress, serving from March 4, 1911 until his death on January 2, 1913. He was an unsuccessful candidate for reelection in 1912 to the Sixty-third Congress. While on an official visit to Colón, Panama, William Wedemeyer committed suicide by jumping from a steam ship on the return voyage to the United States. He had been having suicidal tendencies for a while, after losing his re-election bid for his congressional seat to Samuel Beakes. His body was never recovered. He had been in Panama with an official congressional delegation to coincide with President Taft’s visit to the country.

== See also ==
- List of members of the United States Congress who died in office (1900–1949)

U.S. House of Representatives
Preceded by Charles E. Townsend	United States Representative for the 2nd congressional district of Michigan; 1911– 1913	Succeeded by Samuel Beakes
