= Burlingham, New York =

- Hamlet
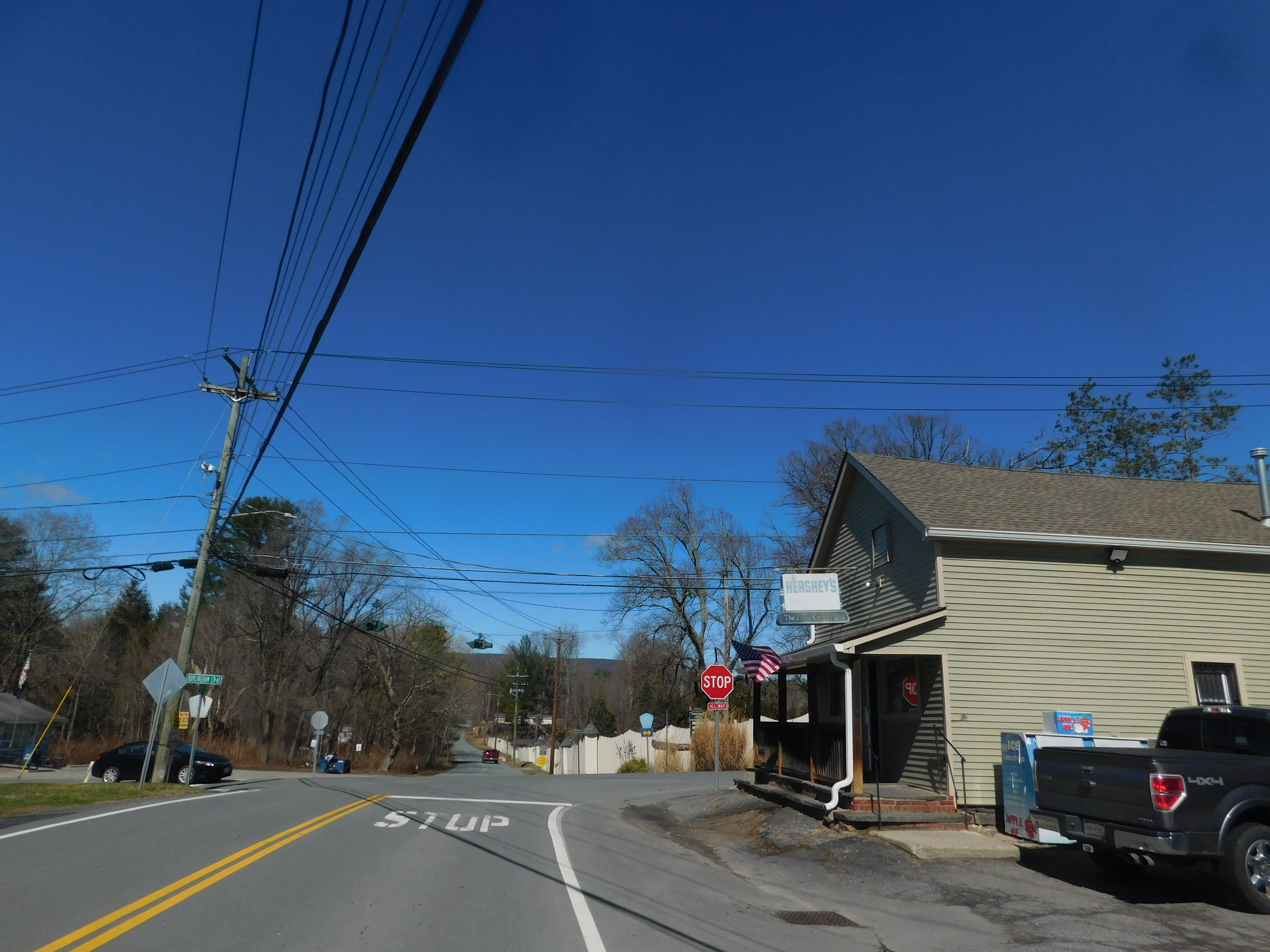
- Burlingham from County Route 66 westbound.

- Location within New York Location within the United States
- Coordinates: 41°35′24″N 74°22′56″W
- Country: United States
- State: New York
- County: Sullivan
- Elevation: 400 ft (120 m)
- Time zone: UTC-5 (Eastern (EST))
  - Summer (DST): UTC-4 (EDT)
- ZIP code: 12722
- Area code: 845
- GNIS feature ID: 945221

Burlingham is a hamlet in Sullivan County, New York, United States. The community is 3.9 miles (6.3 km) northeast of Bloomingburg. Burlingham has a post office with ZIP code 12722.
