= Departmental Reorganization Act =

Act of the United States Congress

Overman Act

United States Congress
- Long title: Departmental Reorganization Act
- Status: Current legislation

The Departmental Reorganization Act (40 Stat. 556, May 20, 1918), also known as the Overman Act, was an American law that increased presidential power during World War I. Sponsored by Sen. Lee S. Overman, a Democrat from North Carolina, it gave President Woodrow Wilson sweeping powers to reorganize government agencies "during the continuance of the present war and for six months after the termination of the war by the proclamation of the treaty of peace, or at such earlier time as the President may designate." (40 Stat. 556) With its authority, Wilson created the War Industries Board, the National War Labor Board, and the Committee on Public Information.

== War Industries Board (WIB) ==
Established by the Council of National Defense under Wall Street broker and Democratic Party activist Bernard M. Baruch, it regulated much of the economy, setting production priorities for factories, and establishing centralized control over raw materials and prices. Mass production techniques were implemented in heavy industry to increase efficiency. The WIB required products to be standardized. It also conducted psychological testing to help people find suitable jobs. The WIB also dealt with labor-management disputes resulting from increased demand by freezing wages and forbidding strikes. With WIB direction, industrial output in the United States increased 20%. The downside, however, was soaring retail prices. Many large industrial firms resisted Baruch's tight-armed tactics, especially U.S. Steel then headed by Elbert Gary. U.S. Steel made enormous wartime profits. Between 1915 and 1919, those profits equaled the wages received by the 2 million U.S. soldiers in France combined. Baruch threatened to take over U.S. Steel unless the company agreed to lower its prices. Gary sneeringly said that the government wasn't capable of running the company. Baruch replied that he would get a 2nd Lieutenant to do the job. “But that won’t trouble you very much,” he added. “If those mill towns find out why we’ve taken over, they’ll present you with your mills -- brick by brick.” – Gary agreed to lower the prices. At WIB suggestion, the Treasury Department sponsored the selling of Treasury Bonds, called the “Liberty Loan Drives.” Such drives were pushed for by the War Finance Corporation (WFC) under Eugene Meyer. Popular actors and actresses like Charlie Chaplin, ”the little tramp,” Douglas Fairbanks, Mary Pickford, ”America’s Sweetheart,” and Sarah Bernhardt publicly campaigned for people to buy them. The campaign raised the then astronomical sum of $21 Billion. Secretary of the Treasury McAdoo even said of the bond drive: “Every person who refuses to subscribe…is a friend of Germany and is not entitled to be an American citizen” and “A man who can’t lend his government $1.25 per week at a rate of 4% interest is not entitled to be an American citizen.” Another popular slogan was “Lick a stamp, and Lick the Kaiser.”

== National War Labor Board (NWLB) ==
Under former President William Howard Taft and Frank P. Walsh, it arbitrated disputes between labor and employers for the sake of the war effort and national unity. The slogan was “Labor will win the War.” Contrary to the phrase's patriotic spirit, however, the War Department established the “work or fight” rule in 1918 which threatened any unemployed male with being immediately drafted. In response, union membership soared from 2.5 million in 1916 to more than 4 million people by 1919, with more than 6,000 strikes breaking out in wartime in protest against stagnant wages at a time of rising prices.

== Committee on Public Information (CPI) ==
Under George Creel, it was the nation's first propaganda agency. It made sure that all communication, either through art, newspapers, cartoons, or sculpture, did not exhibit anti-government tendencies or statements. Numerous silent propaganda movies were made, with such titles as “The Kaiser,” “The Beast of Berlin,” “To Hell With the Kaiser,” “The Claws of the Hun,” and “The Prussian Cur.” The massive propaganda campaign included 75,000 “Four-Minute Men” who gave four-minute speeches to drum up enthusiasm for the war effort. The speeches were on such topics as “Why We Are Fighting,” “Maintaining Morals and Morale,” and “The Meaning of America.” By war's end, 7.5 million speeches had been made to 314 million listeners—Creel created the Division of Pictorial Publicity to spearhead official war propaganda art. He asked Charles Dana Gibson, the creator of the “Gibson Girl” image and who was America's most popular illustrator, to assemble a group of artists to help design posters for the government. Famous illustrators such as James Montgomery Flagg, Joseph Pennell, Louis D. Fancher, and N.C. Wyeth were brought together to produce some of World War I's most lasting images. Flagg drew and painted the “Uncle Sam” image saying “I Want You for the U.S. Army.” Seven million pamphlets entitled “How the War Came To America” were distributed as well.
