= Rivers and Harbors Act of 1913 =

United States federal law

- Long title: An Act making appropriations for the construction, repair, and preservation of certain public works on rivers and harbors, and for other purposes.
- Enacted by: the 62nd United States Congress
- Effective: March 4, 1913

Citations
- Statutes at Large: 37 Stat. 801

Legislative history
- Passed the House on; Passed the Senate on; Signed into law by President William Howard Taft on March 4, 1913

In United States federal legislation, the Rivers and Harbors Act of 1913 appropriated money for various Congressional river and harbor improvement projects, the most prominent of which was Indiana Harbor, Indiana.
