= Labor Department Act =

- Long title: An Act to create a Department of Labor.
- Enacted by: the 62nd United States Congress
- Effective: March 4, 1913

Citations
- Statutes at Large: 37 Stat. 736

Legislative history
- Passed the House on; Passed the Senate on; Signed into law by President William Howard Taft on March 3, 1913

The Labor Department Act, also called the Borah Act, was sponsored by Sen. William E. Borah (R) of Idaho. It was approved on March 4, 1913 (37 Stat. 736).

This was the final bill signed by President William Howard Taft, separating the bureaus and agencies specialized in labor from the Department of Commerce and Labor. Its 1st Secretary was Rep. William B. Wilson (D) of Pennsylvania. As a trade Unionist, Wilson resigned from Congress to accept the position which he held until 1921.

The Department of Labor included:

- 1) the Bureau of Labor Statistics under Dr. Charles Patrick Neill, former Roosevelt Commissioner of Labor, Economics Professor at Catholic University, and the investigator of the meatpacking industry that prompted Upton Sinclair to write The Jungle
- 2) the Bureau of Immigration and Naturalization (INS) which was abolished on Mar. 1st, 2003 and replaced with the U.S. Citizenship and Immigration Services (USCIS)
- 3) the United States Children's Bureau under Julia Lathrop. Lathrop’s father, William Lathrop of Illinois, had helped found the Republican Party in 1854, while she herself was a graduate of Vassar College, a friend of Jane Addams, and a social reformer who had worked at Hull House in Chicago. Appointed by President Taft at the agency’s creation in 1912, she served faithfully until 1921, directing research into child labor, infant and mother mortality, juvenile delinquency, mothers’ pensions, and illegitimacy.

Congress forgot to grant the new Department of Labor a budget or Rep. Wilson a salary.
