= Mial Eben Lilley =

American politician

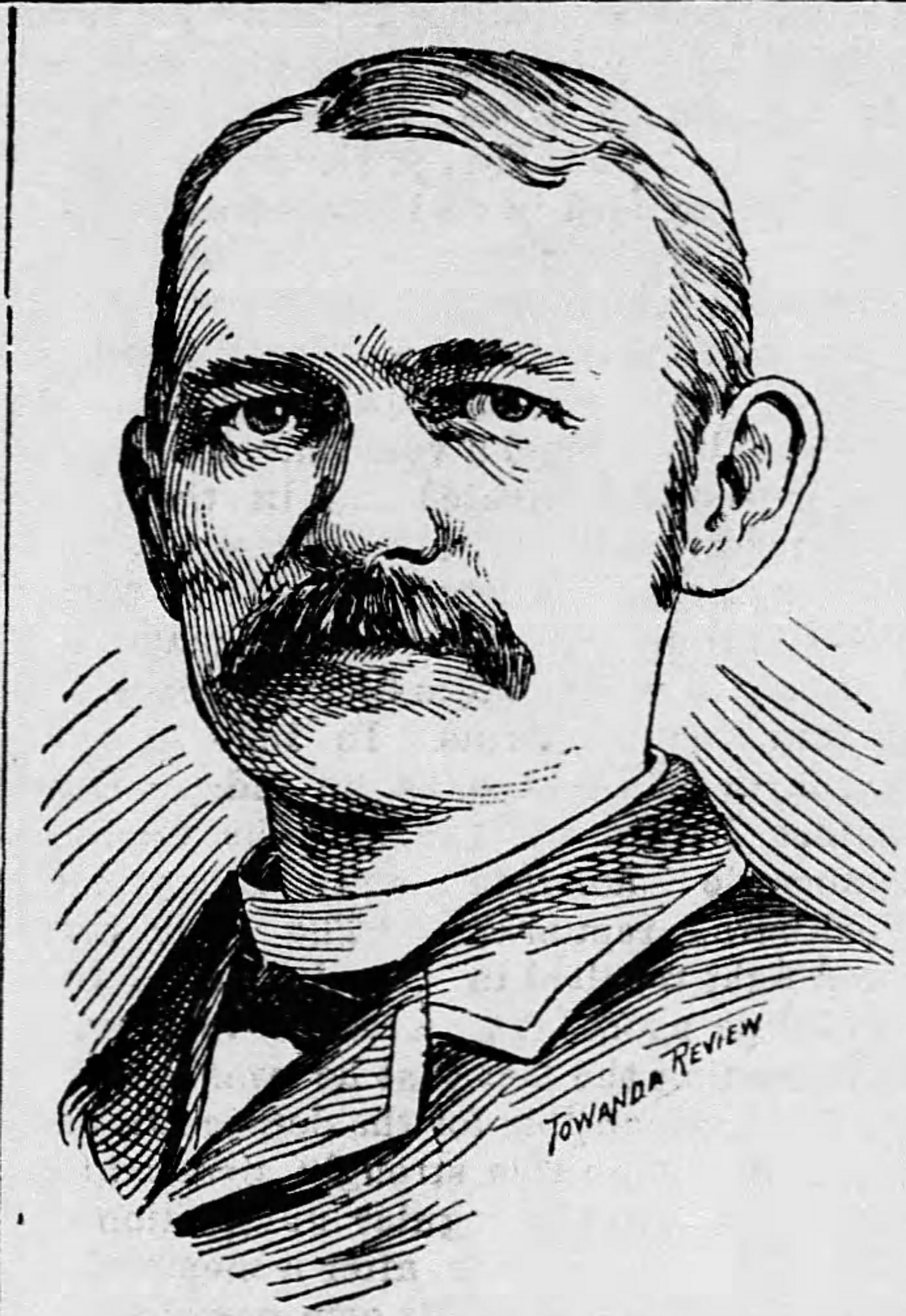
- Illustration, circa 1893

Member of the U.S. House of Representatives from Pennsylvania's 15th district
- In office March 4, 1905 – March 3, 1907

Personal details
- Born: May 30, 1850 Canton, Pennsylvania
- Died: February 28, 1915 (aged 64) Towanda, Pennsylvania
- Resting place: Oak Hill Cemetery, Towanda
- Party: Republican
- Occupation: Lawyer, politician

Mial Eben Lilley (May 30, 1850 – February 28, 1915) was a Republican member of the U.S. House of Representatives from Pennsylvania.

== Biography ==
Mial Eben Lilley was born in Canton, Pennsylvania. He worked as a blacksmith several years.

He studied law in Canton, was admitted to the bar in 1880 and commenced practice in Towanda, Pennsylvania. For several years he was chairman of the Republican committee of Bradford County, Pennsylvania. He was elected prothonotary of Bradford County in 1893 and reelected in 1896. He was appointed assistant United States district attorney for the middle district of Pennsylvania in 1903.

Lilley was elected as a Republican to the Fifty-ninth Congress. He was an unsuccessful candidate for reelection in 1906. He engaged in the practice of his profession until his death in Towanda in 1915, aged 64; he was interred in Oak Hill Cemetery.

== Sources ==
- United States Congress. "Mial Lilley (id: L000309)". Biographical Directory of the United States Congress.
- The Political Graveyard

U.S. House of Representatives
Preceded by Charles F. Wright	Member of the U.S. House of Representatives from Pennsylvania's 14th congressional district 1905–1907	Succeeded by George W. Kipp
