= Publicity In Taking Evidence Act =

American law

Publicity in Taking Evidence Act
- Long title: An Act Providing for publicity in taking evidence under Act of July second, eighteen hundred and ninety
- Enacted by: the 62nd United States Congress
- Effective: March 3, 1913

Citations
- Public law: Public Law 62-416
- Statutes at Large: 37 Stat. 731

Codification
- Acts amended: Sherman Antitrust Act of 1890

Legislative history
- Introduced in the Senate as S. 8000 by George W. Norris (R‑NE) on January 14, 1913; Committee consideration by Senate Committee on the Judiciary; Passed the Senate on January 14, 1913 (Voice vote); Passed the House of Representatives on February 3, 1913 (Voice vote); Signed into law by President William Howard Taft on March 3, 1913

The Publicity in Taking Evidence Act was an act passed in 1913 that provided that depositions of witnesses for use in any anti-trust suit "shall be open to the public as freely as are trials in open court."
