= Merrill Moores =

American politician

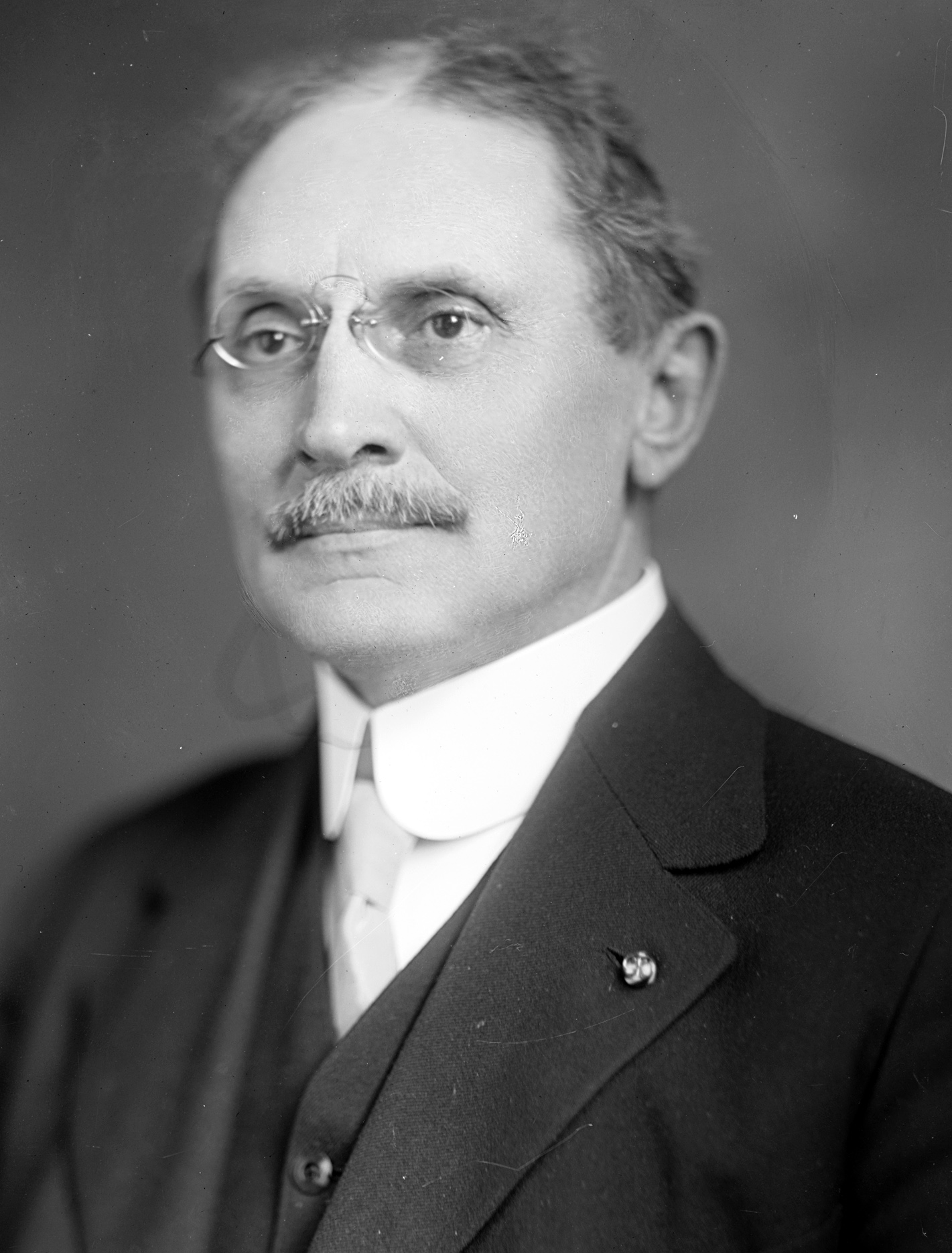

Member of the U.S. House of Representatives from Indiana's 7th district
- In office March 4, 1915 – March 3, 1925
- Preceded by: Charles A. Korbly
- Succeeded by: Ralph E. Updike

Personal details
- Born: April 21, 1856 Indianapolis, Indiana, U.S.
- Died: October 21, 1929 (aged 73) Indianapolis, Indiana, U.S
- Resting place: Crown Hill Cemetery and Arboretum, Section 7, Lot 16, indianapolis, indiana 39.8213678°N 86.1751498°W
- Party: Republican
- Education: Butler University; Willamette University; Yale University; Central Law School of Indiana

Merrill Moores (April 21, 1856 – October 21, 1929) was an American lawyer and politician who served five terms as a U.S. representative from Indiana from 1915 to 1925.

== Biography ==
Moores was born in Indianapolis, Indiana, and received his education in public schools. He attended Butler University and Willamette University before graduating from Yale University in 1878. He later earned a law degree from the Central Law School of Indiana (now Indiana Law School) in Indianapolis in 1880. That same year he was admitted to the bar and began practicing law in Indianapolis.

From 1892 to 1896, Moores served as chairman of the Marion County Republican committee. He went on to become the assistant attorney general of Indiana from 1894 to 1903. In 1908, he served as president of both the Indiana State Bar Association and the Indianapolis Bar Association. He served as Indiana commissioner of the National Conference of Commissioners on Uniform State Laws from 1909 to 1925. He served as member of the executive council of the Interparliamentary Union in 1919.

=== Congress ===
Moores was elected as a Republican to the Sixty-fourth and to the four succeeding Congresses (March 4, 1915 – March 3, 1925). He was an unsuccessful candidate for renomination in 1924 and for nomination in 1926.

=== Later career and death ===
After leaving Congress, Moores resumed the practice of law in Indianapolis. He served as vice president of the American Systems and Audit Co.

Moores died on October 21, 1929, in Indianapolis. He was interred in Crown Hill Cemetery.

U.S. House of Representatives
Preceded by Charles A. Korbly	Member of the U.S. House of Representatives from Indiana's 7th congressional district 1915-1925	Succeeded by Ralph E. Updike
