= Ralph E. Updike =

American politician (1894–1953)

Ralph Eugene Updike
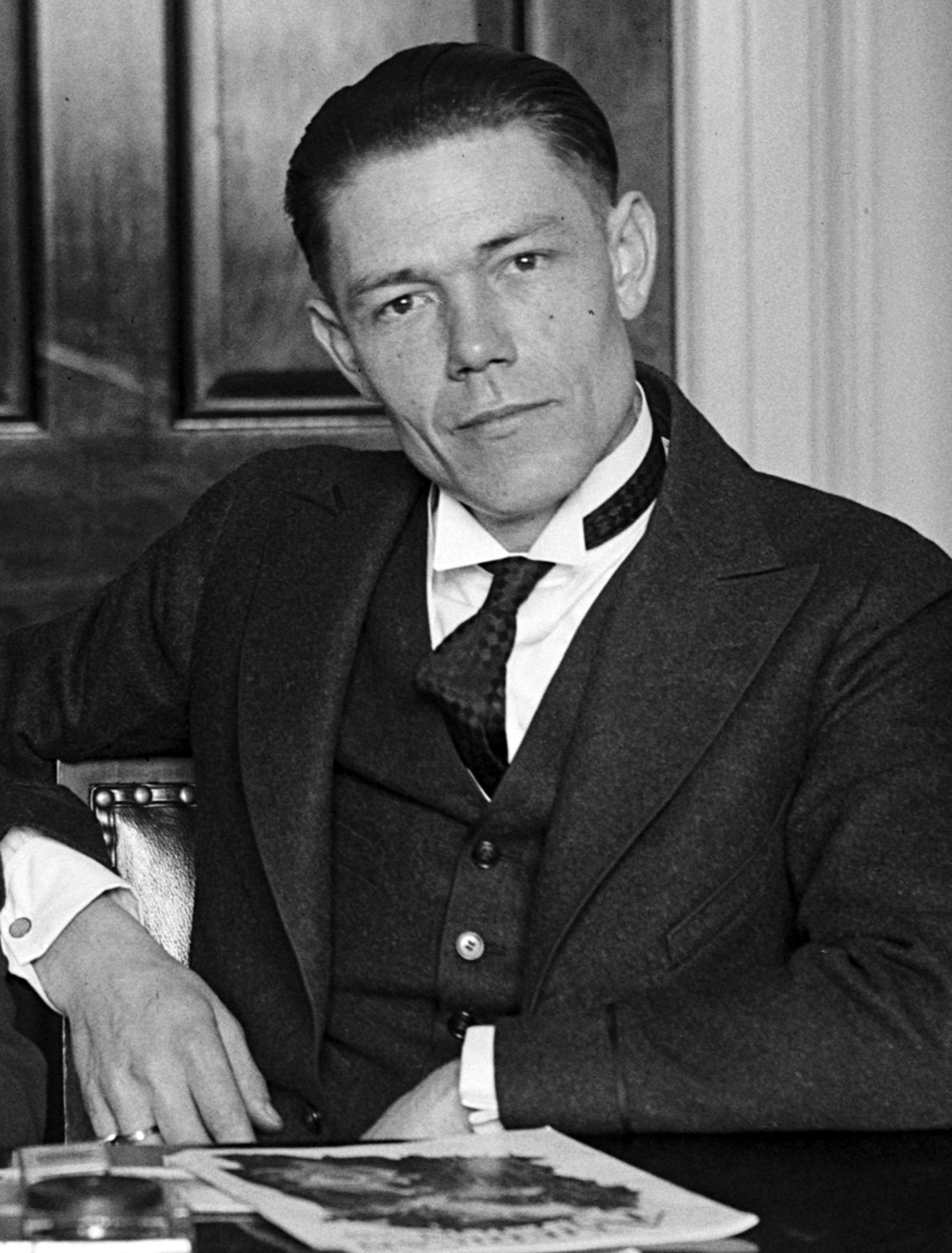

Member of the U.S. House of Representatives from Indiana's 7th district
- In office March 4, 1925 – March 3, 1929
- Preceded by: Merrill Moores
- Succeeded by: Louis Ludlow

Personal details
- Born: May 27, 1894 Brookville, Indiana, U.S.
- Died: September 16, 1953 (aged 59) Arlington, Virginia, U.S.
- Party: Republican
- Education: Columbia University; Purdue University

Ralph Eugene Updike (May 27, 1894 – September 16, 1953) was an American lawyer, jurist, World War I and World War II veteran, and politician who served two terms as a U.S. representative from Indiana from 1925 to 1929.

== Biography ==
Born in Brookville, Indiana, Updike attended the public schools of Whitcomb and Brookville, Dodds Army and Navy Academy, Washington, D.C., Columbia University, New York City, and Purdue University, Lafayette, Indiana. During the First World War served overseas as a sergeant with the Seventy-fourth Company, Sixth Regiment, Second Division, United States Marine Corps from 1916 to 1919. He studied law. He was admitted to the bar in 1920. He was graduated from the law department of Indiana University in 1923 and commenced practice in Indianapolis, Indiana.

=== Early political career ===
He served as member of the State house of representatives 1923–1925. He served as special judge of the city of Indianapolis in 1923 and 1924. He served as special judge of the superior court of Marion County in 1925 and 1926.

=== Congress ===
Updike was elected as a Republican to the Sixty-ninth and Seventieth Congresses (March 4, 1925 – March 3, 1929). He was an unsuccessful candidate for reelection in 1928 to the Seventy-first Congress.

=== Later career ===
He served as special attorney in the Bureau of Internal Revenue 1929–1933. He resumed the practice of law in Indianapolis, Indiana, and Washington, D.C., until March 2, 1942, when he was commissioned a captain in the United States Marine Corps Reserve. He served overseas in the South Pacific with the First Marine Division, Fleet Marine Force, and was inactivated June 15, 1945.

He resumed the practice of law in Indianapolis, Indiana, and Washington, D.C., until his retirement.

=== Death ===
He died in Arlington, Virginia, September 16, 1953. He was interred in Arlington National Cemetery.

Updike was a member of the Indiana Ku Klux Klan.

U.S. House of Representatives
Preceded by Merrill Moores	Member of the U.S. House of Representatives from Indiana's 7th congressional district 1925-1929	Succeeded by Louis Ludlow
