= George W. Kipp =

American politician

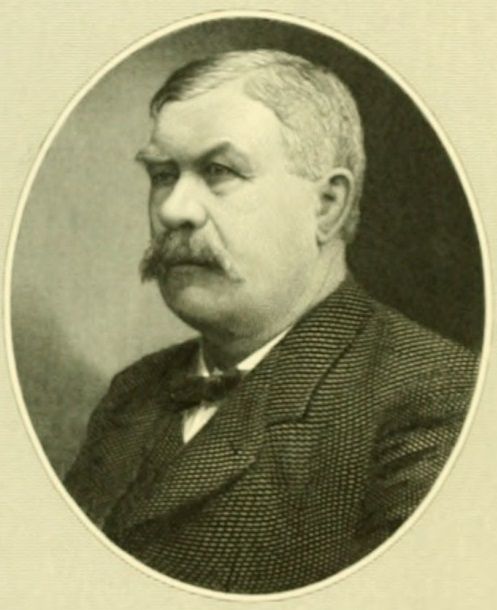
- Frontispiece of 1935's George Washington Kipp, Late a Representative

Member of the U.S. House of Representatives from Pennsylvania's 14th district
- In office March 4, 1911 – July 24, 1911
- Preceded by: Charles C. Pratt
- Succeeded by: William D.B. Ainey
- In office March 4, 1907 – March 3, 1909
- Preceded by: Mial E. Lilley
- Succeeded by: Charles C. Pratt

Personal details
- Born: March 28, 1847 Greene Township, Pennsylvania, U.S.
- Died: July 24, 1911 (aged 64) Vancouver Island, British Columbia, Canada
- Party: Democratic

George Washington Kipp (March 28, 1847 – July 24, 1911) was a Democratic member of the U.S. House of Representatives from Pennsylvania.

== Biography ==
Kipp was born in Greene Township, Pike County, Pennsylvania. He engaged in the lumber business for thirty-five years. He served as a county commissioner of Wayne County, Pennsylvania, in 1880.

Kipp was elected as a Democrat to the Sixtieth Congress. He was not a candidate for renomination in 1908, as he instead chose to run for Pennsylvania State treasurer, for which he was unsuccessful.

He resumed his former business pursuits until the 1910 congressional election when he was once again elected, serving in the Sixty-second Congress until his death, on Vancouver Island, British Columbia. He was interred in Oak Hill Cemetery, Towanda, Pennsylvania.

== See also ==
- List of members of the United States Congress who died in office (1900–1949)

== Sources ==
- United States Congress. "George W. Kipp (id: K000232)". Biographical Directory of the United States Congress.
- The Political Graveyard
- George W. Kipp, late a representative from Pennsylvania, Memorial addresses delivered in the House of Representatives and Senate frontispiece 1913

Party political offices
Preceded by John G. Harman	Democratic nominee for Treasurer of Pennsylvania; 1909	Succeeded by William H. Berry
U.S. House of Representatives
Preceded by Mial E. Lilley	Member of the U.S. House of Representatives from Pennsylvania's 14th congressional district 1907–1909	Succeeded by Charles C. Pratt
Preceded by Charles C. Pratt	Member of the U.S. House of Representatives from Pennsylvania's 14th congressional district 1911	Succeeded by William D.B. Ainey
