= Indiana's 7th congressional district =

U.S. House district for Indiana

Coordinates: 39°45′N 86°9′W

- Interactive map of district boundaries since January 3, 2023
- Representative: André Carson; D–Indianapolis
- Area: 265 mi^{2} (690 km^{2})
- Distribution: 99.7% urban; 0.3% rural
- Population (2025): 765,596
- Median household income: $68,731
- Ethnicity: 45.3% White; 32.9% Black; 14.8% Hispanic; 4.2% Two or more races; 1.9% Asian; 0.8% other
- Cook PVI: D+21

Indiana's 7th congressional district is a congressional district in the U.S. state of Indiana. It is entirely located within Marion County and includes most of Indianapolis, except for the southern side, which is located within the 6th district.

The district is currently represented by Democrat André Carson, who won a special election in 2008 to succeed his grandmother Julia Carson following her death in 2007. With a Cook Partisan Voting Index rating of D+21, it is, by far, the most Democratic district in Indiana.

The district is one of three to be represented by a Muslim in the United States, the others being Michigan's 12th, represented by Rashida Tlaib; and Minnesota's 5th, represented by Ilhan Omar.

From 1967 to 2003, the district served a completely different area of Indiana, covering Fountain, Parke, Tippecanoe, Montgomery, Clinton, Boone, Hendricks, Vigo, Clay, Putnam, and Owen counties and parts of Morgan and Hamilton counties. It had a dramatically different political history from the current 7th; it was a mostly rural area anchored by Terre Haute and Lafayette, and was heavily Republican.

After the loss of a congressional seat in 2000 by virtue of that year's census, an ambitious redistricting plan was implemented in 2002. Most of the old 10th became the new 7th, while the territory of the old 7th was split into the 4th and 8th districts.

This district and its predecessors have not elected a Republican since 1972, and it is considered a safe Democratic seat.

== Composition ==
For the 118th and successive Congresses (based on redistricting following the 2020 census), the district contains all or portions of the following counties and townships:

Marion County (7)

Center, Lawrence, Perry (part, also 7th; includes part of Beech Grove), Pike, Warren, Washington, Wayne

== Recent election results from statewide races ==
Year	Office	Results
2008	President	Obama 68% - 31%
2012	President	Obama 67% - 33%
2012	Senate	Donnelly 69% - 26%
2012	Governor	Gregg 64% - 31%
2016	President	Clinton 65% - 29%
2016	Senate	Bayh 64% - 30%
2016	Governor	Gregg 68% - 30%
2016	Attorney General	Arredondo 62% - 38%
2018	Senate	Donnelly 70% - 26%
2020	President	Biden 70% - 28%
2020	Governor	Myers 58% - 35%
2020	Attorney General	Weinzapfel 70% - 30%
2022	Senate	McDermott Jr. 68% - 29%
2022	Treasurer	McClellan 68% - 32%
2022	Auditor	Brooks 66% - 31%
2022	Secretary of State	Wells 70% - 24%
2024	President	Harris 70% - 28%
2024	Senate	McCray 69% - 29%
2024	Governor	McCormick 70% - 27%
2024	Attorney General	Wells 71% - 29%

== History ==
The current area of the 7th District is largely the same as what had been the 10th District from 1983 to 2003. It includes all of Center Township, now widely regarded as a Democratic stronghold due to its large African American population and gentrified middle class.

Traditionally, the city and the district have been more competitive and much more Republican. For years Indianapolis was one of the most Republican metropolitan areas in the country, particularly during the years when Richard Lugar and William H. Hudnut III served as Mayor of Indianapolis. However, in recent decades, much of the affluence of the city has begun to migrate to the edges of the city and outer Marion County, which has resulted in the Democratic lean. The southern portion of Marion County, which tilts more Republican, is not included in the district.

The southern and eastern parts of the district include the more modest neighborhoods of the city, which is home to Amtrak's largest repair yard. Since the late 1990s, there has been an influx of Mexican and Hispanic workers to the district, which has further increased its Democratic leanings. Also, as the industrial and financial center of Indiana, the district has been strongly influenced by the politics of the unions in the past; however, their influence over the district has become increasingly marginal in recent years.

== List of members representing the district ==
Member	Party	Years	Cong ress	Electoral history
District created March 4, 1833
Edward A. Hannegan (Covington)	Jacksonian	March 4, 1833 – March 3, 1837	23rd 24th	Elected in 1833. Re-elected in 1835. Retired.
Albert S. White (Lafayette)	Whig	March 4, 1837 – March 3, 1839	25th	Elected in 1837. Retired to run for U.S. senator.
Tilghman Howard (Rockville)	Democratic	March 3, 1839 – July 1, 1840	26th	Elected in 1839. Resigned.
Vacant		July 1, 1840 – August 3, 1840	26th	
Henry S. Lane (Crawfordsville)	Whig	August 3, 1840 – March 3, 1843	26th 27th	Elected to finish Howard's term. Re-elected in 1841. Retired.
Joseph A. Wright (Rockville)	Democratic	March 4, 1843 – March 3, 1845	28th	Elected in 1843. Lost re-election.
Edward W. McGaughey (Greencastle)	Whig	March 4, 1845 – March 3, 1847	29th	Elected in 1845. Lost renomination.
Richard W. Thompson (Terre Haute)	Whig	March 4, 1847 – March 3, 1849	30th	Elected in 1847. Renominated but declined to run.
Edward W. McGaughey (Rockville)	Whig	March 4, 1849 – March 3, 1851	31st	Elected in 1849. Lost re-election.
John G. Davis (Rockville)	Democratic	March 4, 1851 – March 3, 1855	32nd 33rd	Elected in 1851. Re-elected in 1852. (Note: Starting in 1852, Indiana held its elections in even-numbered years.); Lost re-election.
Harvey D. Scott (Terre Haute)	People's	March 4, 1855 – March 3, 1857	34th	Elected in 1854. Retired.
John G. Davis (Rockville)	Anti-Lecompton; Democratic	March 4, 1857 – March 3, 1861	35th 36th	Elected in 1856. Re-elected in 1858. Retired.
Daniel W. Voorhees (Terre Haute)	Democratic	March 4, 1861 – February 23, 1866	37th 38th 39th	Elected in 1860. Re-elected in 1862. Lost contested election.
Henry D. Washburn (Clinton)	Republican	February 23, 1866 – March 3, 1869	39th 40th	Won contested election. Re-elected in 1866. Retired.
Godlove S. Orth (Lafayette)	Republican	March 4, 1869 – March 3, 1871	41st	Redistricted from the 8th district and re-elected in 1868. Retired.
Mahlon D. Manson (Crawfordsville)	Democratic	March 4, 1871 – March 3, 1873	42nd	Elected in 1870. Lost re-election.
Thomas J. Cason (Lebanon)	Republican	March 4, 1873 – March 3, 1875	43rd	Elected in 1872. Redistricted to the 9th district.
Franklin Landers (Indianapolis)	Democratic	March 4, 1875 – March 3, 1877	44th	Elected in 1874. Lost re-election.
John Hanna (Indianapolis)	Republican	March 4, 1877 – March 3, 1879	45th	Elected in 1876. Lost re-election.
Gilbert De La Matyr (Indianapolis)	Greenback	March 4, 1879 – March 3, 1881	46th	Elected in 1878. Lost re-election.
Stanton J. Peelle (Indianapolis)	Republican	March 4, 1881 – May 22, 1884	47th 48th	Elected in 1880. Lost contested election.
William E. English (Indianapolis)	Democratic	May 22, 1884 – March 3, 1885	48th	Won contested election. Retired.
William D. Bynum (Indianapolis)	Democratic	March 4, 1885 – March 3, 1895	49th 50th 51st 52nd 53rd	Elected in 1884. Re-elected in 1886. Re-elected in 1888. Re-elected in 1890. Re-elected in 1892. Lost re-election.
Charles L. Henry (Anderson)	Republican	March 4, 1895 – March 3, 1897	54th	Elected in 1894. Redistricted to the 8th district.
Jesse Overstreet (Indianapolis)	Republican	March 4, 1897 – March 3, 1909	55th 56th 57th 58th 59th 60th	Redistricted from the 5th district and re-elected in 1896. Re-elected in 1898. Re-elected in 1900. Re-elected in 1902. Re-elected in 1904. Re-elected in 1906. Lost re-election.
Charles A. Korbly (Indianapolis)	Democratic	March 4, 1909 – March 3, 1915	61st 62nd 63rd	Elected in 1908. Re-elected in 1910. Re-elected in 1912. Lost re-election.
Merrill Moores (Indianapolis)	Republican	March 4, 1915 – March 3, 1925	64th 65th 66th 67th 68th	Elected in 1914. Re-elected in 1916. Re-elected in 1918. Re-elected in 1920. Re-elected in 1922. Lost renomination.
Ralph E. Updike (Indianapolis)	Republican	March 4, 1925 – March 3, 1929	69th 70th	Elected in 1924. Re-elected in 1926. Lost re-election.
Louis Ludlow (Indianapolis)	Democratic	March 4, 1929 – March 3, 1933	71st 72nd	Elected in 1928. Re-elected in 1930. Redistricted to the 12th district.
Arthur H. Greenwood (Washington)	Democratic	March 3, 1933 – January 3, 1939	73rd 74th 75th	Redistricted from the 2nd district and re-elected in 1932. Re-elected in 1934. Re-elected in 1936. Lost re-election.
Gerald W. Landis (Linton)	Republican	January 3, 1939 – January 3, 1949	76th 77th 78th 79th 80th	Elected in 1938. Re-elected in 1940. Re-elected in 1942. Re-elected in 1944. Re-elected in 1946. Lost re-election.
James E. Noland (Bloomington)	Democratic	January 3, 1949 – January 3, 1951	81st	Elected in 1948. Lost re-election.
William G. Bray (Martinsville)	Republican	January 3, 1951 – January 3, 1967	82nd 83rd 84th 85th 86th 87th 88th 89th	Elected in 1950. Re-elected in 1952. Re-elected in 1954. Re-elected in 1956. Re-elected in 1958. Re-elected in 1960. Re-elected in 1962. Re-elected in 1964. Redistricted to the 6th district.
John T. Myers (Covington)	Republican	January 3, 1967 – January 3, 1997	90th 91st 92nd 93rd 94th 95th 96th 97th 98th 99th 100th 101st 102nd 103rd 104th	Elected in 1966. Re-elected in 1968. Re-elected in 1970. Re-elected in 1972. Re-elected in 1974. Re-elected in 1976. Re-elected in 1978. Re-elected in 1980. Re-elected in 1982. Re-elected in 1984. Re-elected in 1986. Re-elected in 1988. Re-elected in 1990. Re-elected in 1992; Re-elected in 1994. Retired.
Edward A. Pease (Terre Haute)	Republican	January 3, 1997 – January 3, 2001	105th 106th	Elected in 1996. Re-elected in 1998. Retired.
Brian D. Kerns (Prairieton)	Republican	January 3, 2001 – January 3, 2003	107th	Elected in 2000. Redistricted to the 4th district and lost renomination.
Julia Carson (Indianapolis)	Democratic	January 3, 2003 – December 15, 2007	108th 109th 110th	Redistricted from the 10th district and re-elected in 2002. Re-elected in 2004. Re-elected in 2006. Died.
Vacant		December 15, 2007 – March 11, 2008	110th	
André Carson (Indianapolis)	Democratic	March 11, 2008 – present	110th 111th 112th 113th 114th 115th 116th 117th 118th 119th	Elected to finish his grandmother's term. Re-elected in 2008. Re-elected in 2010. Re-elected in 2012. Re-elected in 2014. Re-elected in 2016. Re-elected in 2018. Re-elected in 2020. Re-elected in 2022. Re-elected in 2024. Re-elected in 2026.

== Recent election results ==
=== 2002 ===
Indiana's 7th Congressional District election (2002)
Party	Candidate	Votes	%
Democratic	Julia Carson	77,478	53.13%
Republican	Ambrose McVey	64,379	44.14%
Libertarian	Andrew Horning	3,919	2.69%
No party	Others	64	0.04%
Total votes		145,840	100.00%
Turnout			
Democratic gain from Republican			

=== 2004 ===
Indiana's 7th Congressional District election (2004)
Party	Candidate	Votes	%
Democratic	Julia Carson (incumbent)	121,303	54.35%
Republican	Andrew Horning	97,491	43.68%
Libertarian	Barry Campbell	4,381	1.96%
Total votes		223,175	100.00%
Turnout			
Democratic hold			

=== 2006 ===
Indiana's 7th Congressional District election (2006)
Party	Candidate	Votes	%
Democratic	Julia Carson (incumbent)	74,750	53.76%
Republican	Eric Dickerson	64,304	46.24%
Total votes		139,054	100.00%
Turnout			
Democratic hold			

=== 2008 ===
Indiana's 7th Congressional District special election (March 11, 2008)
Party	Candidate	Votes	%
Democratic	André Carson	45,668	54.04%
Republican	Jonathan Elrod	36,415	43.09%
Libertarian	Sean Sheppard	2,430	2.88%
Total votes		84,513	100.00%
Turnout			
Democratic hold			

Indiana's 7th Congressional District general election (2008)
Party	Candidate	Votes	%
Democratic	André Carson (incumbent)	172,650	65.08%
Republican	Gabrielle Campo	92,645	34.92%
Total votes		265,295	100.00%
Turnout			
Democratic hold			

=== 2010 ===
Indiana's 7th Congressional District election (2010)
Party	Candidate	Votes	%
Democratic	André Carson (incumbent)	86,011	58.90%
Republican	Marvin B. Scott	55,213	37.81%
Libertarian	Dav Wilson	4,815	3.30%
Total votes		146,039	100.00%
Turnout			
Democratic hold			

=== 2012 ===
Indiana's 7th Congressional District election (2012)
Party	Candidate	Votes	%
Democratic	André Carson (incumbent)	162,122	62.85%
Republican	Carlos May	95,828	37.15%
Total votes		257,950	100.00%
Turnout			
Democratic hold			

=== 2014 ===
Indiana's 7th Congressional District election (2014)
Party	Candidate	Votes	%
Democratic	Andre Carson (incumbent)	61,443	54.73%
Republican	Catherine Ping	46,887	41.77%
Libertarian	Chris Mayo	3,931	3.50%
Total votes		112,261	100.00%
Democratic hold			

=== 2016 ===
Indiana's 7th Congressional District election (2016)
Party	Candidate	Votes	%
Democratic	André Carson (incumbent)	158,739	59.98%
Republican	Catherine Ping	94,456	35.69%
Libertarian	Drew Thompson	11,475	4.34%
Total votes		264,670	100.00%
Democratic hold			

=== 2018 ===
Indiana's 7th Congressional District election (2018)
Party	Candidate	Votes	%
Democratic	André Carson (incumbent)	141,139	64.9%
Republican	Wayne Harmon	76,457	35.1%
Total votes		217,596	100.0%
Democratic hold			

=== 2020 ===
Indiana's 7th Congressional District election (2020)
Party	Candidate	Votes	%
Democratic	André Carson (incumbent)	176,422	62.4%
Republican	Susan Marie Smith	106,146	37.6%
Total votes		282,568	100.0%
Democratic hold			

=== 2022 ===
Indiana's 7th Congressional District election (2022)
Party	Candidate	Votes	%
Democratic	André Carson (incumbent)	117,309	67.0%
Republican	Angela Grabovsky	53,631	30.6%
Libertarian	Gavin Maple	4,240	2.4%
Total votes		175,180	100.00%
Democratic hold			

=== 2024 ===
Indiana's 7th Congressional District election (2024)
Party	Candidate	Votes	%
Democratic	André Carson (incumbent)	185,987	68.3%
Republican	John Schmitz	78,792	29.0%
Libertarian	Rusty Johnson	7,369	2.7%
Total votes		271,799	100.00%
Democratic hold			

== Historical district boundaries ==
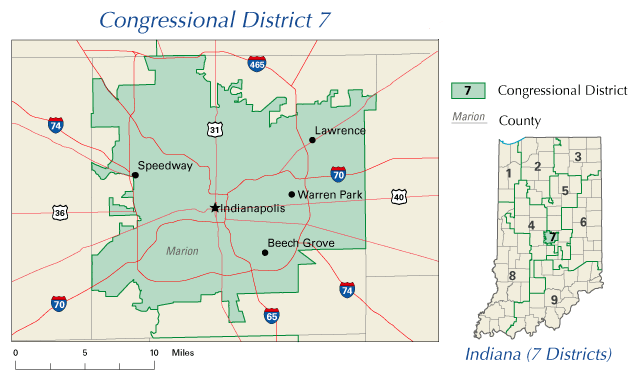
2003 – 2013

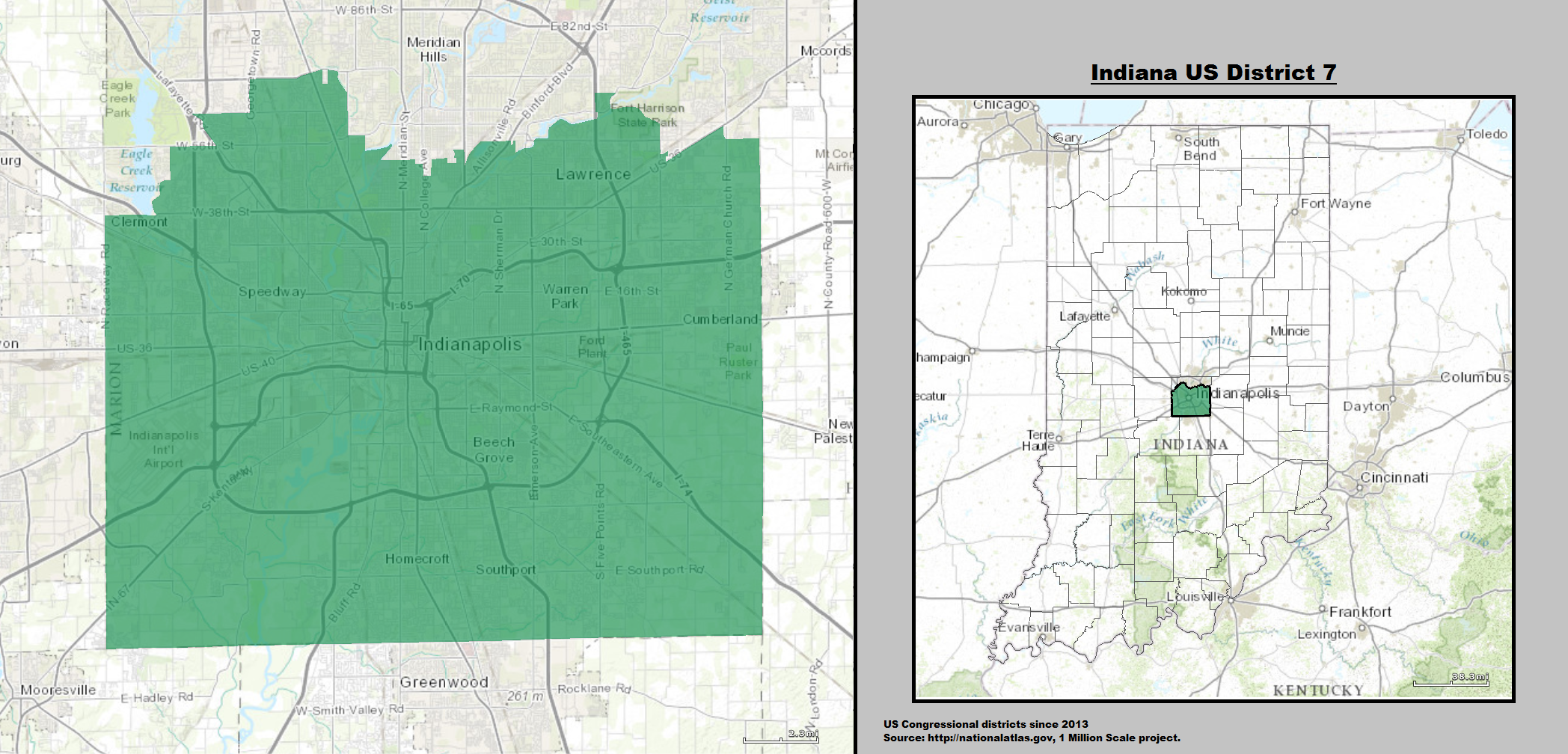
2013 – 2023

== See also ==
- Indiana's congressional districts
- List of United States congressional districts
