= William D.B. Ainey =

American politician (1864–1932)

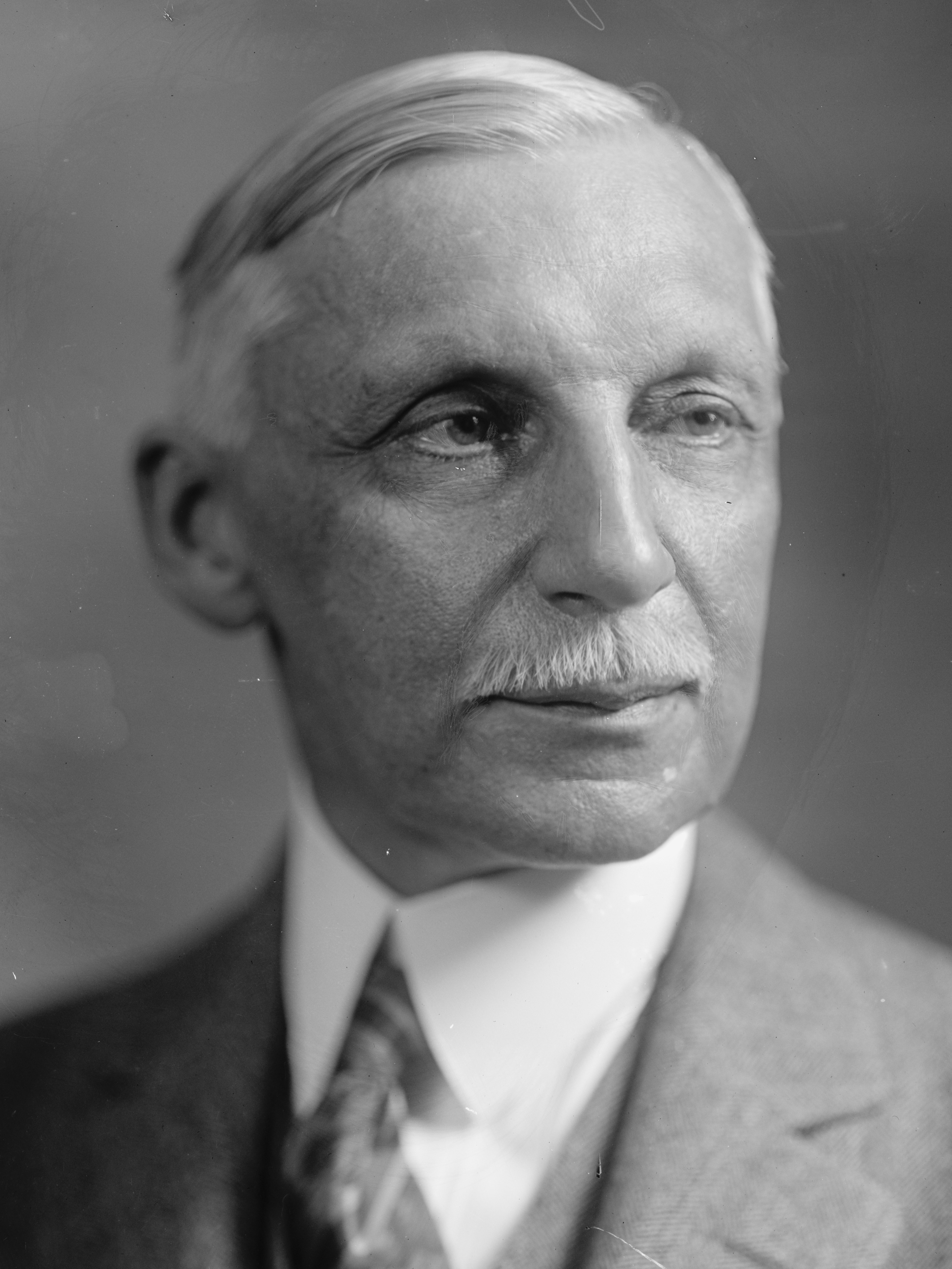
- Ainey in 1905

Member of the U.S. House of Representatives from Pennsylvania's 14th district
- In office November 7, 1911 – March 3, 1915
- Preceded by: George W. Kipp
- Succeeded by: Louis T. McFadden

Personal details
- Born: William David Blakeslee Ainey; April 8, 1864 New Milford, Pennsylvania, U.S.
- Died: September 4, 1932 (aged 68)
- Party: Republican
- Education: Lehigh University

William David Blakeslee Ainey (April 8, 1864 – September 4, 1932) was a Republican member of the U.S. House of Representatives from Pennsylvania.

== Biography ==
Born in New Milford, Pennsylvania, he attended the State Normal School at Mansfield, Pennsylvania, and Lehigh University in Bethlehem, Pennsylvania, in 1887. He studied law, was admitted to the bar in 1887 and commenced practice in Montrose, Pennsylvania. He served as district attorney for Susquehanna County, Pennsylvania, from 1890 to 1896. He organized Company G of the Pennsylvania National Guard and served as captain from 1889 to 1894.

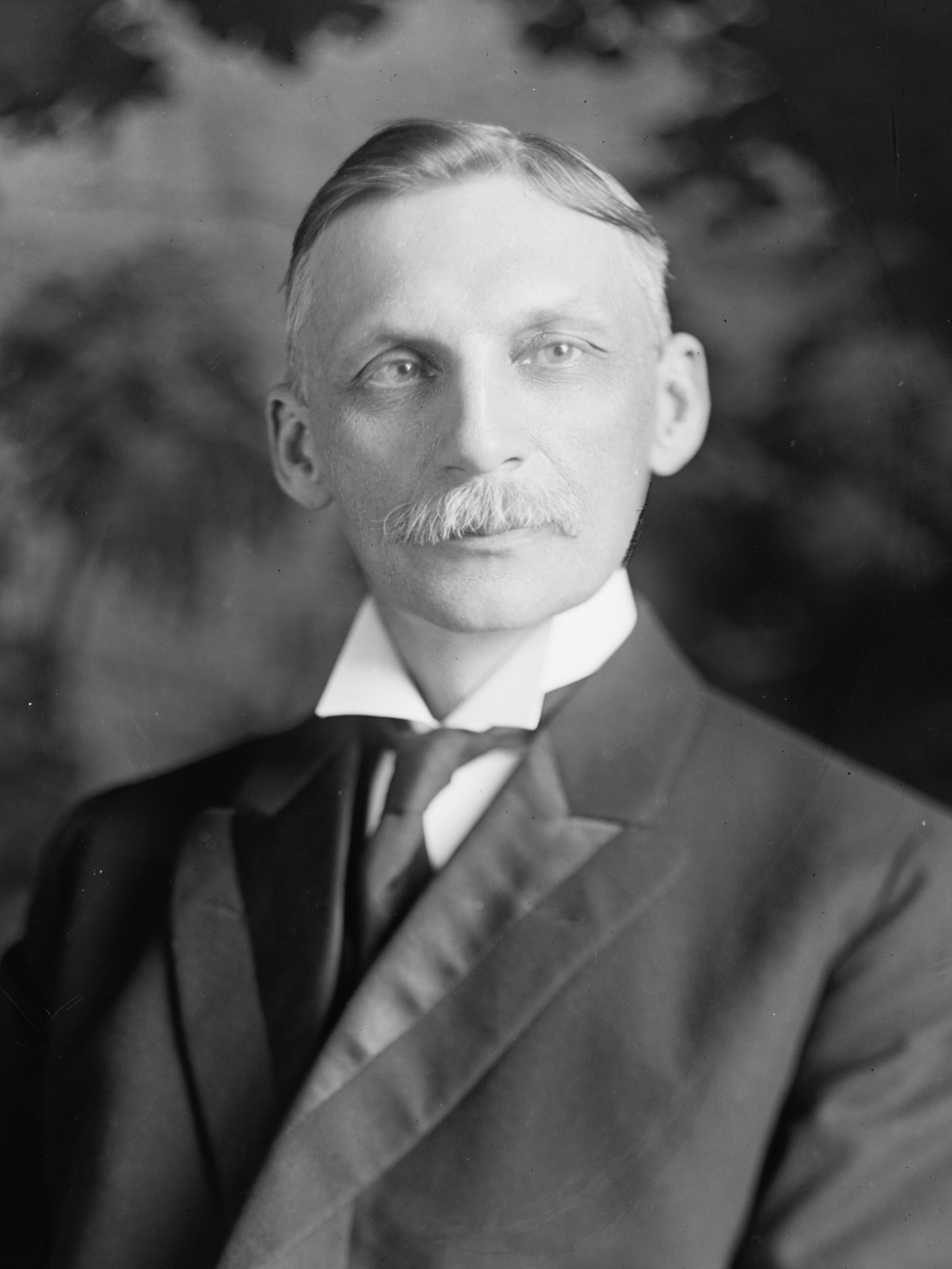
Ainey, 1905–1932

Ainey was elected as a Republican to the 62nd United States Congress to fill the vacancy caused by the death of George W. Kipp. He was reelected to the 63rd United States Congress. He was not a candidate for reelection in 1914.

Ainey was a delegate to the International Parliamentary Union for International Peace held at Geneva, Switzerland, in 1912, and at The Hague in 1913. He served as secretary and president of the Japanese-American group of inter-parliamentarians and delegate in 1914 to Tokyo, Japan, and to Stockholm, Sweden. He resumed the practice of law in Montrose. He was appointed a member of the Public Service Commission of Pennsylvania on May 20, 1915, and on August 20, 1915, was elected chairman. He was reappointed for a ten-year term as member and chairman on July 1, 1917, and again on July 1, 1927. He was appointed chairman of the Pennsylvania Fuel Commission in August 1922. He served as president of the National Association of Railroad and Utilities Commissioners in 1924. He died in Harrisburg, Pennsylvania, in 1932. Interment in Montrose Cemetery in Montrose, Pennsylvania.

== Sources ==
- United States Congress. "William D.B. Ainey (id: A000065)". Biographical Directory of the United States Congress.
- The Political Graveyard

U.S. House of Representatives
Preceded by George W. Kipp	Member of the U.S. House of Representatives from Pennsylvania's 14th congressional district 1911–1915	Succeeded by Louis T. McFadden
