= Federal Revenue Sharing Act =

1939 United States law

- Other short titles: Expenditures from Receipts Act
- Long title: An Act making appropriations for the Department of Agriculture for the fiscal year ending June thirtieth, nineteen hundred and fourteen
- Nicknames: Roads and Trails Fund Act
- Enacted by: the 62nd United States Congress
- Effective: March 4, 1913

Citations
- Public law: Public Law 62-430
- Statutes at Large: 37 Stat. 828

Codification
- U.S.C. sections created: 16 U.S.C. § 501

Legislative history
- Introduced in the House of Representatives as H.R. 28283 by John Lamb (D‑VA) on January 14, 1913; Committee consideration by House Committee on Agriculture; Passed the House of Representatives on January 31, 1913 (Voice vote); Passed the Senate on February 27, 1913 (Voice vote); Reported by the joint conference committee on February 28 – March 3, 1913; agreed to by the House of Representatives on March 3, 1913 (Voice vote) and by the Senate on March 4, 1913 (Voice vote); Signed into law by President William Howard Taft on March 4, 1913

The Federal Revenue Sharing Act, also called the Expenditures from Receipts Act, was a bill passed in 1913 by the US Congress. It allowed the federal government to split national forest and park revenues 50–50 between itself and the states for National Forest Road and Trail repair.
