= Charles A. Korbly =

American politician (1871–1937)

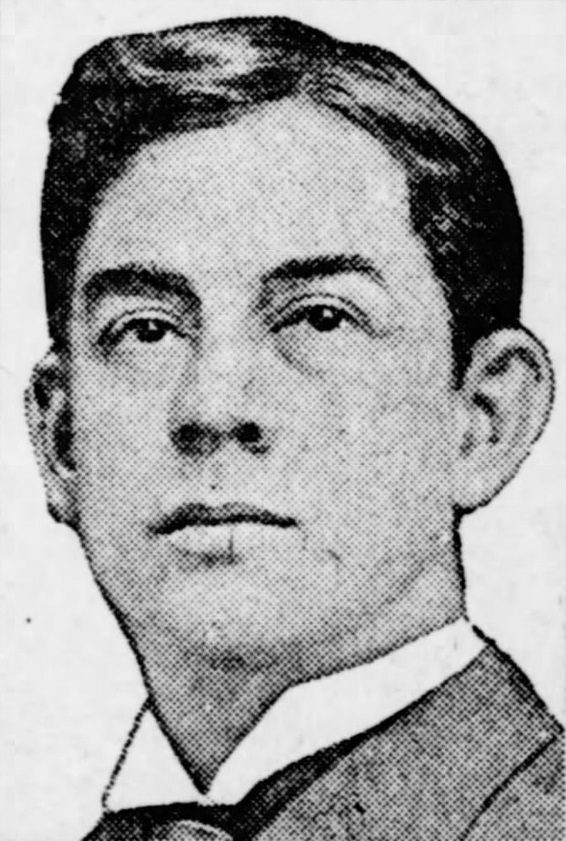
- Drawing of Korby in Madison Herald (1914)

Member of the U.S. House of Representatives from Indiana's 7th district
- In office March 4, 1909 – March 3, 1915
- Preceded by: Jesse Overstreet
- Succeeded by: Merrill Moores

Personal details
- Born: Charles Alexander Korbly; March 24, 1871 Madison, Indiana, U.S.
- Died: July 26, 1937 (aged 66) Washington, D.C., U.S.
- Resting place: Mount Olivet Cemetery; Washington, D.C., U.S.
- Party: Democratic
- Spouse: Isabel Stephens Palmer (m. 1902)
- Children: 5

Charles Alexander Korbly (March 24, 1871 – July 26, 1937) was an American lawyer and politician who served three terms as a U.S. representative from Indiana from 1909 to 1915.

== Early life ==
Charles Alexander Korbly was born on March 24, 1871, in Madison, Indiana. Korbly attended the parochial schools of Madison and St. Joseph's College, near Effingham, Illinois. He worked as a reporter and editor of the Madison Herald. He studied law, was admitted to the bar in 1892.

== Career ==
Korbly commenced practice in Madison, Indiana. He moved to Indianapolis, Indiana, in 1895 and continued the practice of law under his father's law firm, Smith & Korbly. After his father's death in 1900, he practiced law with Alonzo Green Smith until 1902.

Korbly was elected as a Democrat to the Sixty-first, Sixty-second, and Sixty-third Congresses (March 4, 1909 – March 3, 1915). He served as chairman of the Committee on Railways and Canals (Sixty-second Congress). He was an unsuccessful candidate for reelection in 1914 to the Sixty-fourth Congress. He served as receiver general of insolvent national banks in Washington, D.C., from 1915 to 1917. He served as member of the legal staff of the Alien Property Custodian in 1918. He served with the National War Labor Board until it dissolved in 1919 and with the United States Shipping Board until 1922.

He resumed the practice of law in Washington, D.C., in 1922. He also engaged in literary pursuits.

== Personal life and death ==
Korbly married Isabel Stephens Palmer on June 10, 1902. She was the granddaughter of Nathan B. Palmer, speaker of the Indiana House of Representatives and Indiana State Treasurer. Together, they had five children: Richard, Charles, Edward, Elizabeth and Mrs. Arthur T. Cain. Later in life, he lived in Mohican Hills (part of Glen Echo, Maryland).

Korbly died in Washington, D.C., on July 26, 1937. He was interred in Mount Olivet Cemetery in Washington, D.C.

U.S. House of Representatives
| Preceded by Jesse Overstreet | Member of the U.S. House of Representatives from Indiana's 7th congressional district 1909-1915 | Succeeded by Merrill Moores |
