= Virus-Serum-Toxin Act =

- Long title: An Act making appropriations for the Department of Agriculture for the fiscal year ending June thirtieth, nineteen hundred and fourteen.
- Enacted by: the 62nd United States Congress
- Effective: July 1, 1913

Citations
- Statutes at Large: 37 Stat. 832

Legislative history
- Passed the House on; Passed the Senate on; Signed into law by President William Howard Taft on March 4, 1913

The Virus-Serum-Toxin Act or VSTA (P.L. 430 of 1913, as amended; 21 U.S.C. 151-158) was United States federal legislation designed to protect farmers and livestock raisers by regulating the quality of vaccines and point-of-care diagnostics for animals. Initially, the Virus-Serum-Toxin Act was created due to significant losses from unregulated manufacture and distribution of anti-hog cholera serum. The Act's intended purpose is to ensure the safe and efficient supply of animal vaccines and other biological products. The United States Secretary of Agriculture is responsible for licensing and regulating the manufacture, importation, and exportation of affected agents. The act and its applicable guidelines are managed by the Animal and Plant Health Inspection Service (APHIS) of the United States Department of Agriculture (USDA).

== History ==

The Virus-Serum-Toxin Act was enacted in 1913. During this time, a USDA official stated that the bill was crucial "to protect the farmer and stock raiser from improperly made and prepared serums, toxins, and viruses." After seven decades, the Act was amended in 1985 to address the effects of advancement, industrialization, and modernization in the field of agriculture. The Food Security Act of 1985 lists the specific amendments: (1) authorize USDA to regulate intrastate, as well as interstate, movement of biological products, (2) broaden the Secretary's authority to issue regulations, (3) enhance enforcement powers, and (4) recognize a congressional view that regulation is "necessary to prevent and eliminate burdens on commerce and to effectively regulate commerce." In 2002, the VSTA was one out of seven agricultural laws affected by the Homeland Security Act of 2002. This did not cause provisions within the law to change but only shifted certain functions from one department to another. In this case, border and import inspection functions were moved from USDA to the Department of Homeland Security. After the terrorist attacks that took place in America on September 11, 2001, Congress wanted to merge all of the major border inspection activities under the control of one department to make things easier and more efficient. Currently, the DHS manages the physical inspection of imports, but the USDA still has authority over VSTA regulations and policies. The DHS and USDA are required to cooperate with each other for proper regulation and inspection practice.

== Provisions ==

It makes it unlawful for any person, firm or corporation to engage in the "preparation, sale, barter, exchange, or shipment" of "worthless, contaminated, dangerous or harmful" virus, serum, toxin, or analogous animal biologicals in interstate commerce. The Act provides for licensing of products and establishments, and requires permits for the importation of animal biologicals. Regulations require preparation of biologicals in accordance with an approved Outline of Production so as to meet prescribed test requirements for purity, safety, potency, and efficacy. Regulations also require approval of all labeling and claims to be made in advertising. Animal biologicals are subject to both the Federal Food, Drug, and Cosmetic Act and the VST Act. The USDA Animal and Plant Health Inspection Service (APHIS) enforces the VST Act.

=== Licenses issued by Administrator ===
It is required that every person who is trained to prepare biological products subject to the VSTA shall have an unexpired, unsuspended, and unrevoked U.S. Veterinary Biologics Establishment License and at least one unexpired, unsuspended, and unrevoked U.S. Veterinary Biological Product License issued by the Administrator to prepare a biological product. Applicants who apply for an establishment license must also apply for at least one product license. An establishment license will not be issued without a license allowing the production of a biological product in the establishment.

=== Types of license applications and their regulations ===
- U.S. Veterinary Biologics Establishment License: The operator of each establishment has to submit a written application to the Administrator for a license. Blank applications are available upon request from the Animal and Plant Health Inspection Service. When a person runs more than one establishment, a separate application is required for each establishment. The person of the establishment who is interested in applying for a license must have a statement explaining the relationship between the applicant and the company. If there is a change in ownership, operation, location of establishment, or the license becomes expired, a new application must be filled out. Before the license can be issued by the Administrator, an inspection of the establishment will take place. The conditions, equipment, facilities, and methods used to prepare the biological products will be examined. The inspection will verify that the establishment meets all of the requirements. A license will not be issued unless the Administrator feels the establishment will use the products efficiently for all its intended purposes. They also must operate in compliance with VSTA. In addition, the applicant or person who is responsible for producing the biological product has to be qualified by education and/or experience. The establishment must state in written form that they will not use false advertisements concerning the biological product. Consumers cannot be misled or deceived.
- U.S. Veterinary Biological Product License: The operator of the establishment has to submit a written application to the Administrator to obtain a license for each biological product that will be prepared in the establishment. Along with the application, several documents must be attached. The first type of document includes least four copies of an Outline of Production. Second, at least three copies of test reports and research data necessary to establish purity, safety, potency, and efficacy of the product must be attached. Third, legends describing which facilities are going to prepare each fraction of product are required. The fourth document has to contain completed labels. Along with these labels, all of the advertising matter and information regarding all claims to be made on labels must be attached. Once received, the Office of Management and Budget will approve this application. Once approved, several things must appear on the license. The true name of the product and its code number must be listed. The date in which the license was issued must be shown. Restrictions will be involved with the use of the product, which might include limited distribution and supervised usage. Licensed individuals have the option to request specific restrictions on the product if it pertains to the protection and safety of domestic animals and/or public health. These requests must be written and sent to the Director, Center for Veterinary Biologics, Licensing and Policy Development. In the requests, the person must state why the restrictions are needed. Supporting documents for these requests may also be attached.

== Controversy ==
The first case of bovine spongiform encephalopathy (BSE), or mad cow disease, in the U.S. was reported in December 2003 at a farm in the state of Washington. Since the cow was from Canada, USDA officials thought the American beef supply was safe. However, after Japan and fifty-two other countries banned U.S. beef, the USDA started a program to test half of the nation's 450,000 cows that could not walk. The program did not find any cases of mad cow disease until June 25, 2005. The cow was found to have originated from America, was first tested in November 2004, and was recommended to be retested. During this time, the Bush administration restored about one-third of U.S. beef exports through intense lobbying, but Japan, the biggest export market, continued to deny America's beef. After a while, Japan lifted part of its ban. They allowed meat only from the carcasses of young cows that have had their spinal cords, vertebrae, brains, and bone marrow removed. Eventually, Japan reenacted the ban after a shipment from the U.S. contained meat with the vertebrae still attached. This has caused speculation on whether the VSTA regulates testing for BSE in cows. Many people believe that Congress should pass legislation forcing the USDA to license BSE testing to ranchers and slaughterhouses, and it is possible to amend the VSTA to do so.

After the first case of mad cow disease that was discovered, two more cases emerged. In 2005, the second instance was found in a cow in Texas, and the third was found in 2006 in a cow from Alabama. In 2012, this issue still remains a controversy. On April 24, 2012, the Department of Agriculture discovered a dairy cow in central California with mad cow disease. The USDA's chief veterinary officer, John Clifford, stated that the cow's meat did not enter the food supply. In addition to this, the carcass will be destroyed. The infected cow was found due to random sampling and is considered the fourth cow in the U.S. to be infected with BSE. This has caused the controversy to arise once again and speculation on whether the VSTA regulates testing for BSE in cows is still a hot topic to be discussed.
