= Carlin Act =

1913 law of the United States Congress

- Long title: An Act to punish the larceny of goods in the course of interstate or foreign commerce, and for other purposes.
- Enacted by: the 62nd United States Congress
- Effective: February 13, 1913

Citations
- Statutes at Large: 37 Stat. 670

Legislative history
- Passed the House on; Passed the Senate on; Signed into law by President William Howard Taft on February 13, 1913

The Carlin Act of 1913, sponsored by Rep. Charles Creighton Carlin (D) of Virginia and signed into law by President William Howard Taft, was an Act of the United States Congress that made larceny from interstate carriers a felony and a federal crime.

An amendment to the Carlin Act was introduced by Rep. Leonidas C. Dyer (R) of Missouri and passed by the 68th United States Congress, expanding its scope to cover any "station house, platform, depot, wagon, automobile, truck, or other vehicle" associated with freight or express shipments. The amended act provided a fine of not more than $5,000, imprisonment for more than 10 years, or both, and stated that a crime could be prosecuted in whichever district it was committed. President Calvin Coolidge signed the amendment in 1925.

The Carlin Act was amended again in January 1933, making it a violation not only to break open or rob boxcars involved in interstate commerce, but also to "obtain by any fraudulent device, scheme, or game, any moneys, baggage, goods, or chattels, from any passenger while on a passenger car, sleeping car, or dining car, in a train moving in interstate commerce." According to the report of the committee on the bill, this was prompted by reports of passengers on Pullman berths being robbed at night while they were sleeping. In such a situation, the committee said, "the thief [could] not be prosecuted under the Carlin Act, because the property is taken from the possession or custody of the passenger and not from the carrier."
