= 62nd United States Congress =

1911-1913 U.S. Congress

←	61st	63rd	→
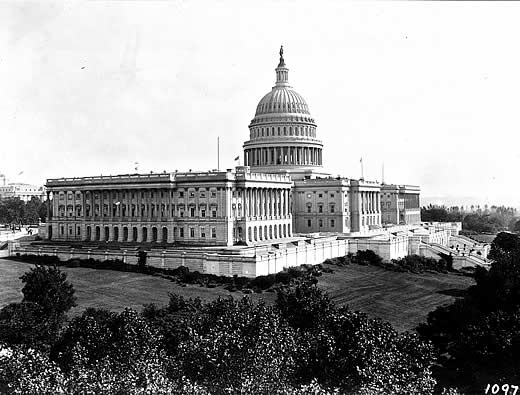
- United States Capitol (1906)

Overview
- Legislative body: United States Congress
- Jurisdiction: United States
- Term: March 4, 1911 – March 4, 1913

Senate
- Members: 92 - 96
- President: James S. Sherman (R) (Note: U.S. Vice President Sherman's term as President of the Senate ended on October 30, 1912 when he died in office. There were four President pro tempores rotated in each appointee, Charles Curtis, Jacob H. Gallinger, Frank B. Brandegee, and Henry Cabot Lodge, acted their duties as the President of the Senate prior to the ratification of the Twenty-fifth Amendment.) (until October 30, 1912); Vacant (from October 30, 1912)
- President pro tempore: Augustus O. Bacon (D); Charles Curtis (R); Jacob H. Gallinger (R); Frank B. Brandegee (R); Henry Cabot Lodge (R)
- Party control: Republican

House of Representatives
- Members: 391 - 394 representatives 5 - 7 non-voting delegates
- Speaker: Champ Clark (D)
- Party control: Democratic

Sessions
- 1st: April 4, 1911 – August 22, 1911
- 2nd: December 4, 1911 – August 26, 1912
- 3rd: December 2, 1912 – March 3, 1913

The 62nd United States Congress was a meeting of the legislative branch of the United States federal government, composed of the United States Senate and the United States House of Representatives. It met in Washington, D.C., from March 4, 1911, to March 4, 1913, during the final two years of William H. Taft's presidency.

The apportionment of seats in the House of Representatives was based on the 1900 United States census. Additional House seats were assigned to the two new states of New Mexico and Arizona. The size of the House was to be 435 starting with the new Congress coming into session in 1913. The Senate had a Republican majority, and the House flipped into a Democratic majority. This change of control ended the 14-year-long Republican government trifecta that began in the 55th Congress, one of only two trifectas that lasted longer than a decade.

== Major events ==
- April 27, 1911: Following the resignation and death of William P. Frye, a compromise is reached to rotate the office of President pro tempore of the United States Senate.
- October 30, 1912: Vice President James S. Sherman died. It is the most recent time a vice president has died in office.

== Major legislation ==
- August 8, 1911: Public Law 62-5, Pub. L. 62–5 (set House of Representatives size at 435 members)
- August 24, 1912: Lloyd–La Follette Act, ch. 389, § 6, 37 Stat. 539
- February 13, 1913: Carlin Act
- March 1, 1913: Webb–Kenyon Act
- March 1, 1913: Railway Evaluation Act
- March 3, 1913: Publicity In Taking Evidence Act
- March 3, 1913: Virus-Serum-Toxin Act
- March 3, 1913: Gould Amendment
- March 4, 1913: Arlington Memorial Amphitheater Act
- March 4, 1913: Road and Trails Fund Act
- March 4, 1913: Burnett Act
- March 4, 1913: Weeks–McLean Act
- March 4, 1913: Federal Revenue Sharing Act
- March 4, 1913: Rivers and Harbors Act of 1913
- March 4, 1913: Burnt Timber Act
- March 4, 1913: Labor Department Act, 37 Stat. 736

== Constitutional amendments ==
- May 13, 1912: Approved an amendment to the United States Constitution establishing the popular election of United States senators by the people of the states, and submitted it to the state legislatures for ratification
  - Amendment was later ratified on April 8, 1913, becoming the seventeenth Amendment to the United States Constitution
- February 3, 1913: Sixteenth Amendment to the United States Constitution was ratified by the requisite number of states (then 36) to become part of the Constitution

== States admitted and territories created ==
- January 6, 1912: New Mexico admitted to the Union.
- February 14, 1912: Arizona admitted to the Union
- August 24, 1912: Alaska Territory created.

== Party summary ==
=== Senate ===
	Party (shading shows control)			Total	Vacant
	Democratic (D)	Bull Moose (Prog.)	Republican (R)	Total	Vacant
End of previous congress	32	0	59	91	1
Begin	40	0	50	90	2
End	45	0	50	95	1
Final voting share	47.4%	0.0%	52.6%		
Beginning of next congress	49	1	42	92	4

=== House of Representatives ===
	Party (shading shows control)					Total	Vacant
	Democratic (D)	Socialist (S)	Bull Moose (Prog.)	Republican (R)	Other	Total	Vacant
End of previous congress	173	0	0	210	1 (Note: Independent Democratic)	384	7
Begin	228	1	0	161	0	390	1
End	225	1	0	156	0	382	12
Final voting share	58.9%	0.3%	0.0%	40.8%	0.0%		
Beginning of next congress	289	0	10	134	1 (Note: Independent)	434	1

== Leaders ==
=== Senate ===
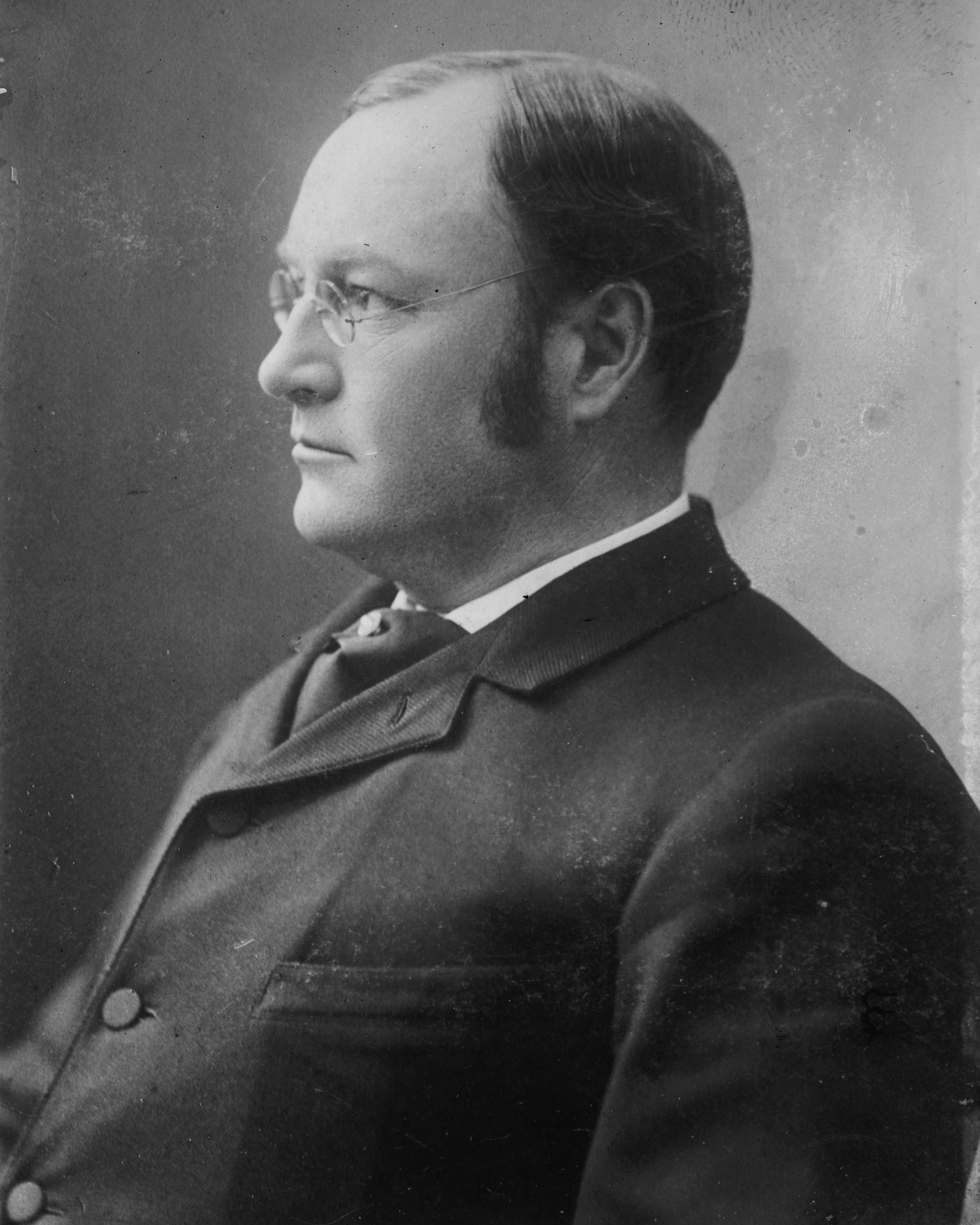
President of the Senate James S. Sherman

- President: James S. Sherman (R), until October 30, 1912; thereafter vacant
- Presidents pro tempore: William P. Frye (R), until April 27, 1911.
  - For the remainder of this Congress, the office rotated among five senators. The Senate at that time was split between progressive Republicans, conservative Republicans, and Democrats. Each put forth a candidate, and the ballots were deadlocked until August 1911 when a compromise was reached. Democrat Augustus Bacon served for one day on August 14, 1911, and thereafter he and four Republicans rotated holding the seat for the remainder of the Congress. These Republicans were: Charles Curtis, Jacob H. Gallinger, Frank B. Brandegee, and Henry Cabot Lodge.
- Republican Conference Chairman: Shelby Moore Cullom
- Democratic Caucus Chairman: Thomas S. Martin
- Republican Conference Secretary: Charles Curtis
- Democratic Caucus Secretary: William E. Chilton

=== House of Representatives ===
- Speaker: Champ Clark (D)

==== Majority (Democratic) leadership ====
- Majority Leader: Oscar Underwood
- Majority Whip: vacant
- Democratic Caucus Chairman: Albert S. Burleson
- Democratic Campaign Committee Chairman: James Tilghman Lloyd

==== Minority (Republican) leadership ====
- Minority Leader: James R. Mann
- Minority Whip: John W. Dwight
- Republican Conference Chairman: Frank Dunklee Currier

== Members ==
Skip to House of Representatives, below

=== Senate ===
At this time, most senators were elected by the state legislatures every two years, with one-third beginning new six-year terms with each Congress. A few senators were elected directly by the residents of the state. Preceding the names in the list below are Senate class numbers, which indicate the cycle of their election, In this Congress, Class 2 meant their term ended with this Congress, requiring reelection in 1912; Class 3 meant their term began in the last Congress, requiring reelection in 1914; and Class 1 meant their term began in this Congress, requiring reelection in 1916.

==== Alabama ====
▌2. John H. Bankhead (D)
▌3. Joseph F. Johnston (D)

==== Arizona ====
▌1. Henry F. Ashurst (D), from April 2, 1912
▌3. Marcus A. Smith (D), from April 2, 1912

==== Arkansas ====
▌2. Jeff Davis (D), until January 3, 1913

▌John N. Heiskell (D), January 6, 1913 – January 29, 1913
▌William M. Kavanaugh (D), from January 29, 1913

▌3. James P. Clarke (D)

==== California ====
▌1. John D. Works (R)
▌3. George C. Perkins (R)

==== Colorado ====
▌2. Simon Guggenheim (R)
▌3. Charles S. Thomas (D), from January 15, 1913

==== Connecticut ====
▌1. George P. McLean (R)
▌3. Frank B. Brandegee (R)

==== Delaware ====
▌1. Henry A. du Pont (R)
▌2. Harry A. Richardson (R)

==== Florida ====
▌1. Nathan P. Bryan (D)
▌3. Duncan U. Fletcher (D)

==== Georgia ====
▌2. Augustus O. Bacon (D)
▌3. Joseph M. Terrell (D), until July 14, 1911

▌Hoke Smith (D), from November 16, 1911

==== Idaho ====
▌2. William E. Borah (R)
▌3. Weldon B. Heyburn (R), until October 17, 1912

▌Kirtland I. Perky (D), November 18, 1912 – February 5, 1913
▌James H. Brady (R), from February 6, 1913

==== Illinois ====
▌2. Shelby M. Cullom (R)
▌3. William Lorimer (R), until July 13, 1912

==== Indiana ====
▌1. John W. Kern (D)
▌3. Benjamin F. Shively (D)

==== Iowa ====
▌2. Lafayette Young (R), until April 11, 1911

▌William S. Kenyon (R), from April 12, 1911

▌3. Albert B. Cummins (R)

==== Kansas ====
▌2. Charles Curtis (R)
▌3. Joseph L. Bristow (R)

==== Kentucky ====
▌2. Thomas H. Paynter (D)
▌3. William O. Bradley (R)

==== Louisiana ====
▌2. Murphy J. Foster (D)
▌3. John Thornton (D)

==== Maine ====
▌1. Charles Fletcher Johnson (D)
▌2. William P. Frye (R), until August 8, 1911

▌Obadiah Gardner (D), from September 23, 1911

==== Maryland ====
▌1. Isidor Rayner (D), until November 25, 1912

▌William P. Jackson (R), from November 29, 1912

▌3. John W. Smith (D)

==== Massachusetts ====
▌1. Henry Cabot Lodge (R)
▌2. Winthrop M. Crane (R)

==== Michigan ====
▌1. Charles E. Townsend (R)
▌2. William Alden Smith (R)

==== Minnesota ====
▌1. Moses E. Clapp (R)
▌2. Knute Nelson (R)

==== Mississippi ====
▌1. John Sharp Williams (D)
▌2. LeRoy Percy (D)

==== Missouri ====
▌1. James A. Reed (D)
▌3. William J. Stone (D)

==== Montana ====
▌1. Henry L. Myers (D)
▌2. Joseph M. Dixon (R)

==== Nebraska ====
▌1. Gilbert M. Hitchcock (D)
▌2. Norris Brown (R)

==== Nevada ====
▌1. George S. Nixon (R), until June 5, 1912

▌William A. Massey (R), July 1, 1912 – January 29, 1913
▌Key Pittman (D), from January 29, 1913

▌3. Francis G. Newlands (D)

==== New Hampshire ====
▌2. Henry E. Burnham (R)
▌3. Jacob H. Gallinger (R)

==== New Jersey ====
▌1. James E. Martine (D)
▌2. Frank O. Briggs (R)

==== New Mexico ====
▌1. Thomas B. Catron (R), from April 2, 1912
▌2. Albert B. Fall (R), from April 2, 1912

==== New York ====
▌1. James A. O'Gorman (D), from April 4, 1911
▌3. Elihu A. Root (R)

==== North Carolina ====
▌2. Furnifold M. Simmons (D)
▌3. Lee S. Overman (D)

==== North Dakota ====
▌1. Porter J. McCumber (R)
▌3. Asle J. Gronna (R)

==== Ohio ====
▌1. Atlee Pomerene (D)
▌3. Theodore E. Burton (R)

==== Oklahoma ====
▌2. Robert L. Owen (D)
▌3. Thomas P. Gore (D)

==== Oregon ====
▌2. Jonathan Bourne Jr. (R)
▌3. George E. Chamberlain (D)

==== Pennsylvania ====
▌1. George T. Oliver (R)
▌3. Boies Penrose (R)

==== Rhode Island ====
▌1. Henry F. Lippitt (R)
▌2. George P. Wetmore (R)

==== South Carolina ====
▌2. Benjamin R. Tillman (D)
▌3. Ellison D. Smith (D)

==== South Dakota ====
▌2. Robert J. Gamble (R)
▌3. Coe I. Crawford (R)

==== Tennessee ====
▌1. Luke Lea (D)
▌2. Robert L. Taylor (D), until March 31, 1912

▌Newell Sanders (R), April 11, 1912 – January 24, 1913
▌William R. Webb (D), from January 24, 1913

==== Texas ====
▌1. Charles A. Culberson (D)
▌2. Joseph W. Bailey (D), until January 3, 1913

▌Rienzi M. Johnston (D), January 4, 1913 – January 29, 1913
▌Morris Sheppard (D), from February 3, 1913

==== Utah ====
▌1. George Sutherland (R)
▌3. Reed Smoot (R)

==== Vermont ====
▌1. Carroll S. Page (R)
▌3. William P. Dillingham (R)

==== Virginia ====
▌1. Claude A. Swanson (D)
▌2. Thomas S. Martin (D)

==== Washington ====
▌1. Miles Poindexter (R)
▌3. Wesley L. Jones (R)

==== West Virginia ====
▌1. William E. Chilton (D)
▌2. Clarence W. Watson (D)

==== Wisconsin ====
▌1. Robert M. La Follette Sr. (R)
▌3. Isaac Stephenson (R)

==== Wyoming ====
▌1. Clarence D. Clark (R)
▌2. Francis E. Warren (R)

Senators' party membership by state at the opening of the 62nd Congress in March 1911. The senators from Arizona and New Mexico were not seated until April 2, 1912. 2 Democrats 1 Democrat and 1 Republican 2 Republicans

=== House of Representatives ===
The names of representatives are preceded by their district numbers.

==== Alabama ====
▌1. George W. Taylor (D)
▌2. S. Hubert Dent Jr. (D)
▌3. Henry D. Clayton (D)
▌4. Fred L. Blackmon (D)
▌5. J. Thomas Heflin (D)
▌6. Richmond P. Hobson (D)
▌7. John L. Burnett (D)
▌8. William N. Richardson (D)
▌9. Oscar Underwood (D)

==== Arizona ====
▌At-large. Carl Hayden (D), from February 19, 1912

==== Arkansas ====
▌1. Robert B. Macon (D)
▌2. William A. Oldfield (D)
▌3. John C. Floyd (D)
▌4. William B. Cravens (D)
▌5. Henderson M. Jacoway (D)
▌6. Joseph Taylor Robinson (D), until January 14, 1913

▌Samuel M. Taylor (D), from January 15, 1913

▌7. William S. Goodwin (D)

==== California ====
▌1. John E. Raker (D)
▌2. William Kent (R)
▌3. Joseph R. Knowland (R)
▌4. Julius Kahn (R)
▌5. Everis A. Hayes (R)
▌6. James C. Needham (R)
▌7. William Stephens (R)
▌8. Sylvester C. Smith (R), until January 26, 1913

==== Colorado ====
▌1. Atterson Walden Rucker (D)
▌2. John A. Martin (D)
▌At-large. Edward T. Taylor (D)

==== Connecticut ====
▌1. E. Stevens Henry (R)
▌2. Thomas L. Reilly (D)
▌3. Edwin W. Higgins (R)
▌4. Ebenezer J. Hill (R)
▌At-large. John Q. Tilson (R)

==== Delaware ====
▌At-large. William H. Heald (R)

==== Florida ====
▌1. Stephen M. Sparkman (D)
▌2. Frank Clark (D)
▌3. Dannite H. Mays (D)

==== Georgia ====
▌1. Charles G. Edwards (D)
▌2. Seaborn Roddenbery (D)
▌3. Dudley M. Hughes (D)
▌4. William C. Adamson (D)
▌5. William S. Howard (D)
▌6. Charles L. Bartlett (D)
▌7. Gordon Lee (D)
▌8. Samuel J. Tribble (D)
▌9. Thomas Montgomery Bell (D)
▌10. Thomas W. Hardwick (D)
▌11. William G. Brantley (D)

==== Idaho ====
▌AL. Burton L. French (R)

==== Illinois ====
▌1. Martin B. Madden (R)
▌2. James R. Mann (R)
▌3. William W. Wilson (R)
▌4. James T. McDermott (D)
▌5. Adolph J. Sabath (D)
▌6. Edmund J. Stack (D)
▌7. Frank Buchanan (D)
▌8. Thomas Gallagher (D)
▌9. Lynden Evans (D)
▌10. George E. Foss (R)
▌11. Ira C. Copley (R)
▌12. Charles Eugene Fuller (R)
▌13. John C. McKenzie (R)
▌14. James McKinney (R)
▌15. George W. Prince (R)
▌16. Claude U. Stone (D)
▌17. John A. Sterling (R)
▌18. Joseph G. Cannon (R)
▌19. William B. McKinley (R)
▌20. Henry T. Rainey (D)
▌21. James M. Graham (D)
▌22. William A. Rodenberg (R)
▌23. Martin D. Foster (D)
▌24. H. Robert Fowler (D)
▌25. Napoleon B. Thistlewood (R)

==== Indiana ====
▌1. John W. Boehne (D)
▌2. William A. Cullop (D)
▌3. William E. Cox (D)
▌4. Lincoln Dixon (D)
▌5. Ralph Wilbur Moss (D)
▌6. Finly H. Gray (D)
▌7. Charles A. Korbly (D)
▌8. John A. M. Adair (D)
▌9. Martin A. Morrison (D)
▌10. Edgar D. Crumpacker (R)
▌11. George W. Rauch (D)
▌12. Cyrus Cline (D)
▌13. Henry A. Barnhart (D)

==== Iowa ====
▌1. Charles A. Kennedy (R)
▌2. Irvin S. Pepper (D)
▌3. Charles E. Pickett (R)
▌4. Gilbert N. Haugen (R)
▌5. James W. Good (R)
▌6. Nathan E. Kendall (R)
▌7. Solomon F. Prouty (R)
▌8. Horace M. Towner (R)
▌9. Walter I. Smith (R), until March 15, 1911

▌William R. Green (R), from June 5, 1911

▌10. Frank P. Woods (R)
▌11. Elbert H. Hubbard (R), until June 4, 1912

▌George Cromwell Scott (R), from November 5, 1912

==== Kansas ====
▌1. Daniel Read Anthony Jr. (R)
▌2. Alexander C. Mitchell (R), until July 7, 1911

▌Joseph Taggart (D), from November 7, 1911

▌3. Philip P. Campbell (R)
▌4. Fred S. Jackson (R)
▌5. Rollin R. Rees (R)
▌6. Isaac D. Young (R)
▌7. Edmond H. Madison (R), until September 18, 1911

▌George A. Neeley (D), from January 9, 1912

▌8. Victor Murdock (R)

==== Kentucky ====
▌1. Ollie M. James (D)
▌2. Augustus Stanley (D)
▌3. Robert Y. Thomas Jr. (D)
▌4. Ben Johnson (D)
▌5. J. Swagar Sherley (D)
▌6. Arthur B. Rouse (D)
▌7. J. Campbell Cantrill (D)
▌8. Harvey Helm (D)
▌9. William Jason Fields (D)
▌10. John W. Langley (R)
▌11. Caleb Powers (R)

==== Louisiana ====
▌1. Albert Estopinal (D)
▌2. Henry Garland Dupré (D)
▌3. Robert F. Broussard (D)
▌4. John Thomas Watkins (D)
▌5. Joseph E. Ransdell (D)
▌6. Robert Charles Wickliffe (D), until June 11, 1912

▌Lewis Lovering Morgan (D), from November 5, 1912

▌7. Arsène Paulin Pujó (D)

==== Maine ====
▌1. Asher C. Hinds (R)
▌2. Daniel J. McGillicuddy (D)
▌3. Samuel W. Gould (D)
▌4. Frank E. Guernsey (R)

==== Maryland ====
▌1. J. Harry Covington (D)
▌2. J. Frederick C. Talbott (D)
▌3. George Konig (D)
▌4. J. Charles Linthicum (D)
▌5. Thomas Parran Sr. (R)
▌6. David J. Lewis (D)

==== Massachusetts ====
▌1. George P. Lawrence (R)
▌2. Frederick H. Gillett (R)
▌3. John A. Thayer (D)
▌4. William H. Wilder (R)
▌5. Butler Ames (R)
▌6. Augustus P. Gardner (R)
▌7. Ernest W. Roberts (R)
▌8. Samuel W. McCall (R)
▌9. William F. Murray (D)
▌10. James Michael Curley (D)
▌11. Andrew J. Peters (D)
▌12. John W. Weeks (R)
▌13. William S. Greene (R)
▌14. Robert O. Harris (R)

==== Michigan ====
▌1. Frank E. Doremus (D)
▌2. William Wedemeyer (R), until January 2, 1913
▌3. John M. C. Smith (R)
▌4. Edward L. Hamilton (R)
▌5. Edwin F. Sweet (D)
▌6. Samuel W. Smith (R)
▌7. Henry McMorran (R)
▌8. Joseph W. Fordney (R)
▌9. James C. McLaughlin (R)
▌10. George A. Loud (R)
▌11. Francis H. Dodds (R)
▌12. H. Olin Young (R)

==== Minnesota ====
▌1. Sydney Anderson (R)
▌2. Winfield Scott Hammond (D)
▌3. Charles Russell Davis (R)
▌4. Frederick C. Stevens (R)
▌5. Frank Nye (R)
▌6. Charles August Lindbergh (R)
▌7. Andrew Volstead (R)
▌8. Clarence B. Miller (R)
▌9. Halvor Steenerson (R)

==== Mississippi ====
▌1. Ezekiel S. Candler Jr. (D)
▌2. Hubert D. Stephens (D)
▌3. Benjamin G. Humphreys II (D)
▌4. Thomas U. Sisson (D)
▌5. Samuel Andrew Witherspoon (D)
▌6. Pat Harrison (D)
▌7. William A. Dickson (D)
▌8. James W. Collier (D)

==== Missouri ====
▌1. James T. Lloyd (D)
▌2. William W. Rucker (D)
▌3. Joshua Willis Alexander (D)
▌4. Charles F. Booher (D)
▌5. William Patterson Borland (D)
▌6. Clement C. Dickinson (D)
▌7. Courtney W. Hamlin (D)
▌8. Dorsey W. Shackleford (D)
▌9. James Beauchamp Clark (D)
▌10. Richard Bartholdt (R)
▌11. Theron Ephron Catlin (R), until August 12, 1912

▌Patrick F. Gill (D), from August 12, 1912

▌12. Leonidas C. Dyer (R)
▌13. Walter Lewis Hensley (D)
▌14. Joseph J. Russell (D)
▌15. James Alexander Daugherty (D)
▌16. Thomas L. Rubey (D)

==== Montana ====
▌At-large. Charles N. Pray (R)

==== Nebraska ====
▌1. John A. Maguire (D)
▌2. Charles O. Lobeck (D)
▌3. James P. Latta (D), until September 11, 1911

▌Dan V. Stephens (D), from November 7, 1911

▌4. Charles Henry Sloan (R)
▌5. George W. Norris (R)
▌6. Moses P. Kinkaid (R)

==== Nevada ====
▌At-large. Edwin E. Roberts (R)

==== New Hampshire ====
▌1. Cyrus A. Sulloway (R)
▌2. Frank Dunklee Currier (R)

==== New Jersey ====
▌1. Henry C. Loudenslager (R), until August 12, 1911

▌William J. Browning (R), from November 7, 1911

▌2. John J. Gardner (R)
▌3. Thomas J. Scully (D)
▌4. Ira W. Wood (R)
▌5. William E. Tuttle Jr. (D)
▌6. William Hughes (D), until September 27, 1912

▌Archibald C. Hart (D), from November 5, 1912

▌7. Edward W. Townsend (D)
▌8. Walter I. McCoy (D)
▌9. Eugene F. Kinkead (D)
▌10. James A. Hamill (D)

==== New Mexico ====
▌At-large. Harvey B. Fergusson (D), from January 8, 1912
▌At-large. George Curry (R), from January 8, 1912

==== New York ====
▌1. Martin W. Littleton (D)
▌2. George H. Lindsay (D)
▌3. James P. Maher (D)
▌4. Frank E. Wilson (D)
▌5. William C. Redfield (D)
▌6. William M. Calder (R)
▌7. John J. Fitzgerald (D)
▌8. Daniel J. Riordan (D)
▌9. Henry M. Goldfogle (D)
▌10. William Sulzer (D), until December 31, 1912
▌11. Charles V. Fornes (D)
▌12. Michael F. Conry (D)
▌13. Jefferson M. Levy (D)
▌14. John J. Kindred (D)
▌15. Thomas G. Patten (D)
▌16. Francis B. Harrison (D)
▌17. Henry George Jr. (D)
▌18. Stephen B. Ayres (D)
▌19. John E. Andrus (R)
▌20. Thomas W. Bradley (R)
▌21. Richard E. Connell (D), until October 30, 1912
▌22. William H. Draper (R)
▌23. Henry S. De Forest (R)
▌24. George W. Fairchild (R)
▌25. Theron Akin (R)
▌26. George R. Malby (R), until July 5, 1912

▌Edwin A. Merritt (R), from November 5, 1912

▌27. Charles A. Talcott (D)
▌28. Luther W. Mott (R)
▌29. Michael E. Driscoll (R)
▌30. John W. Dwight (R)
▌31. Sereno E. Payne (R)
▌32. Henry G. Danforth (R)
▌33. Edwin S. Underhill (D)
▌34. James S. Simmons (R)
▌35. Daniel A. Driscoll (D)
▌36. Charles B. Smith (D)
▌37. Edward B. Vreeland (R)

==== North Carolina ====
▌1. John Humphrey Small (D)
▌2. Claude Kitchin (D)
▌3. John M. Faison (D)
▌4. Edward W. Pou (D)
▌5. Charles M. Stedman (D)
▌6. Hannibal L. Godwin (D)
▌7. Robert N. Page (D)
▌8. Robert L. Doughton (D)
▌9. Edwin Y. Webb (D)
▌10. James M. Gudger Jr. (D)

==== North Dakota ====
▌At-large. Louis B. Hanna (R), until January 7, 1913
▌At-large. Henry Thomas Helgesen (R)

==== Ohio ====
▌1. Nicholas Longworth (R)
▌2. Alfred G. Allen (D)
▌3. James M. Cox (D), until January 12, 1913
▌4. J. Henry Goeke (D)
▌5. Timothy T. Ansberry (D)
▌6. Matthew R. Denver (D)
▌7. James D. Post (D)
▌8. Frank B. Willis (R)
▌9. Isaac R. Sherwood (D)
▌10. Robert M. Switzer (R)
▌11. Horatio C. Claypool (D)
▌12. Edward L. Taylor Jr. (R)
▌13. Carl C. Anderson (D), until October 1, 1912
▌14. William G. Sharp (D)
▌15. George White (D)
▌16. William B. Francis (D)
▌17. William A. Ashbrook (D)
▌18. John J. Whitacre (D)
▌19. Elsworth R. Bathrick (D)
▌20. L. Paul Howland (R)
▌21. Robert J. Bulkley (D)

==== Oklahoma ====
▌1. Bird Segle McGuire (R)
▌2. Dick Thompson Morgan (R)
▌3. James S. Davenport (D)
▌4. Charles D. Carter (D)
▌5. Scott Ferris (D)

==== Oregon ====
▌1. Willis C. Hawley (R)
▌2. Walter Lafferty (R)

==== Pennsylvania ====
▌1. Henry H. Bingham (R), until March 22, 1912

▌William S. Vare (R), from May 24, 1912

▌2. William S. Reyburn (R), from May 23, 1911
▌3. J. Hampton Moore (R)
▌4. Reuben O. Moon (R)
▌5. Michael Donohoe (D)
▌6. George D. McCreary (R)
▌7. Thomas S. Butler (R)
▌8. Robert E. Difenderfer (D)
▌9. William W. Griest (R)
▌10. John R. Farr (R)
▌11. Charles C. Bowman (R), until December 12, 1912
▌12. Robert Emmett Lee (D)
▌13. John H. Rothermel (D)
▌14. George W. Kipp (D), until July 24, 1911

▌William D. B. Ainey (R), from November 7, 1911

▌15. William B. Wilson (D)
▌16. John G. McHenry (D), until December 27, 1912
▌17. Benjamin K. Focht (R)
▌18. Marlin E. Olmsted (R)
▌19. Jesse L. Hartman (R)
▌20. Daniel F. Lafean (R)
▌21. Charles E. Patton (R)
▌22. Curtis H. Gregg (D)
▌23. Thomas S. Crago (R)
▌24. Charles Matthews (R)
▌25. Arthur L. Bates (R)
▌26. A. Mitchell Palmer (D)
▌27. J. N. Langham (R)
▌28. Peter M. Speer (R)
▌29. Stephen G. Porter (R)
▌30. John Dalzell (R)
▌31. James F. Burke (R)
▌32. Andrew J. Barchfeld (R)

==== Rhode Island ====
▌1. George Francis O'Shaunessy (D)
▌2. George H. Utter (R), until November 3, 1912

==== South Carolina ====
▌1. George S. Legare (D), until January 31, 1913
▌2. James F. Byrnes (D)
▌3. Wyatt Aiken (D)
▌4. Joseph T. Johnson (D)
▌5. David E. Finley (D)
▌6. J. Edwin Ellerbe (D)
▌7. Asbury F. Lever (D)

==== South Dakota ====
▌At-large. Charles H. Burke (R)
▌At-large. Eben W. Martin (R)

==== Tennessee ====
▌1. Sam R. Sells (R)
▌2. Richard W. Austin (R)
▌3. John A. Moon (D)
▌4. Cordell Hull (D)
▌5. William C. Houston (D)
▌6. Joseph W. Byrns (D)
▌7. Lemuel P. Padgett (D)
▌8. Thetus W. Sims (D)
▌9. Finis J. Garrett (D)
▌10. George W. Gordon (D), until August 9, 1911

▌Kenneth McKellar (D), from December 4, 1911

==== Texas ====
▌1. Morris Sheppard (D), until February 3, 1913
▌2. Martin Dies (D)
▌3. James Young (D)
▌4. Choice B. Randell (D)
▌5. James Andrew Beall (D)
▌6. Rufus Hardy (D)
▌7. Alexander W. Gregg (D)
▌8. John M. Moore (D)
▌9. George Farmer Burgess (D)
▌10. Albert S. Burleson (D)
▌11. Robert L. Henry (D)
▌12. Oscar Callaway (D)
▌13. John H. Stephens (D)
▌14. James L. Slayden (D)
▌15. John Nance Garner (D)
▌16. William R. Smith (D)

==== Utah ====
▌At-large. Joseph Howell (R)

==== Vermont ====
▌1. David J. Foster (R), until March 21, 1912

▌Frank L. Greene (R), from July 30, 1912

▌2. Frank Plumley (R)

==== Virginia ====
▌1. William A. Jones (D)
▌2. Edward Everett Holland (D)
▌3. John Lamb (D)
▌4. Robert Turnbull (D)
▌5. Edward W. Saunders (D)
▌6. Carter Glass (D)
▌7. James Hay (D)
▌8. Charles Creighton Carlin (D)
▌9. C. Bascom Slemp (R)
▌10. Henry D. Flood (D)

==== Washington ====
▌1. William E. Humphrey (R)
▌2. Stanton Warburton (R)
▌3. William Leroy La Follette (R)

==== West Virginia ====
▌1. John W. Davis (D)
▌2. William Gay Brown Jr. (D)
▌3. Adam B. Littlepage (D)
▌4. John M. Hamilton (D)
▌5. James Anthony Hughes (R)

==== Wisconsin ====
▌1. Henry Allen Cooper (R)
▌2. John M. Nelson (R)
▌3. Arthur W. Kopp (R)
▌4. William J. Cary (R)
▌5. Victor L. Berger (S)
▌6. Michael Edmund Burke (D)
▌7. John J. Esch (R)
▌8. James H. Davidson (R)
▌9. Thomas Frank Konop (D)
▌10. Elmer A. Morse (R)
▌11. Irvine L. Lenroot (R)

==== Wyoming ====
▌At-large. Franklin W. Mondell (R)

==== Non-voting members ====
▌Alaska Territory. James Wickersham (R)
▌Arizona Territory. Ralph H. Cameron (R), until February 14, 1912
▌Hawaii Territory. Jonah Kūhiō Kalanianaʻole (R)
▌New Mexico Territory. William Henry Andrews (R), until January 6, 1912
▌Philippines seat A. Benito Legarda y Tuason (Resident Commissioner), (Fed., R)
▌Philippines seat B. Manuel L. Quezon (Resident Commissioner), (Nac.)
▌Puerto Rico. Luis Muñoz Rivera (Resident Commissioner), (Unionist)

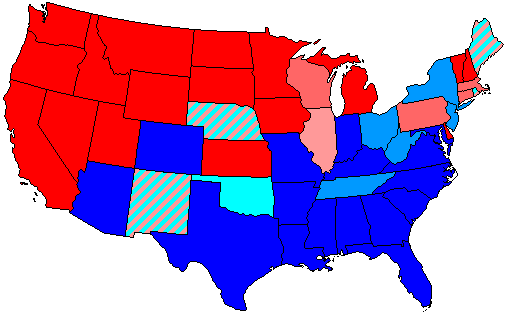
House seats by party holding plurality in state: 80+% to 100% Democratic / 80+% to 100% Republican; 60+% to 80% Democratic / 60+% to 80% Republican; Up to 60% Democratic / Up to 60% Republican

== Changes in membership ==
=== Senate ===
There were 20 changes: 6 deaths, 2 resignations, 1 invalidated election, 6 appointees replaced by electees, 4 seats added from new states, and 1 seat vacant from the previous Congress. Democrats had a 4-seat net gain, and no other parties had a net change.

State (class)	Vacated by	Reason for vacancy	Subsequent	Date of successor's installation
New York (1)	Vacant	Legislature failed to elect. Election deadlock extends for three months until successor is chosen.	James A. O'Gorman (D)	March 31, 1911
Arizona (1)	New seats	Arizona achieved statehood February 14, 1912	Henry F. Ashurst (D)	April 2, 1912
Arizona (3)	New seats	Arizona achieved statehood February 14, 1912	Marcus A. Smith (D)	April 2, 1912
New Mexico (1)	New seats	New Mexico achieved statehood January 6, 1912	Thomas B. Catron (R)	April 2, 1912
New Mexico (2)	New seats	New Mexico achieved statehood January 6, 1912	Albert B. Fall (R)	April 2, 1912
Colorado (3)	Vacant	Sen. Charles J. Hughes Jr. died January 11, 1911, before the end of the previous Congress. Winner was elected to finish term ending March 4, 1915.	Charles S. Thomas (D)	January 15, 1913
Iowa (2)	Lafayette Young (R)	Appointment expired April 11, 1911, upon successor's special election to finish term ending March 4, 1913.	William S. Kenyon (R)	April 12, 1911
Georgia (3)	Joseph M. Terrell (D)	Resigned July 14, 1911, for health reasons. Successor was elected.	Hoke Smith (D)	November 16, 1911
Maine (2)	William P. Frye (R)	Died August 8, 1911. Successor was appointed September 23, 1911, and subsequently elected April 2, 1912.	Obadiah Gardner (D)	September 23, 1911
Tennessee (2)	Robert Love Taylor (D)	Died March 31, 1912. Successor was appointed to continue the term.	Newell Sanders (R)	April 11, 1912
Nevada (1)	George S. Nixon (R)	Died June 5, 1912. Successor was appointed to continue the term.	William A. Massey (R)	July 1, 1912
Illinois (3)	William Lorimer (R)	Senate invalidated election July 13, 1912.	Vacant until next Congress	
Idaho (3)	Weldon B. Heyburn (R)	Died October 17, 1912. Successor was appointed to continue the term.	Kirtland I. Perky (D)	November 18, 1912
Maryland (1)	Isidor Rayner (D)	Died November 25, 1912. Successor was appointed.	William P. Jackson (R)	November 29, 1912
Arkansas (2)	Jeff Davis (D)	Died January 3, 1913. Successor was appointed to continue the term.	John N. Heiskell (D)	January 6, 1913
Texas (2)	Joseph W. Bailey (D)	Resigned January 3, 1913, due to investigations brought to light suspicious income and financial ties to the oil industry. Successor was appointed to continue the therm.	Rienzi Melville Johnston (D)	January 4, 1913
Tennessee (2)	Newell Sanders (R)	Appointment expired January 24, 1913, upon successor's special election to finish term ending March 4, 1913.	William R. Webb (D)	January 24, 1913
Nevada (1)	William A. Massey (R)	Appointment expired January 29, 1913, upon successor's special election.	Key Pittman (D)	January 29, 1913
Arkansas (2)	John N. Heiskell (D)	Appointment expired January 29, 1913, upon successor's special election to finish term ending March 4, 1913.	William M. Kavanaugh (D)	January 29, 1913
Texas (2)	Rienzi M. Johnston (D)	Appointment expired January 29, 1913, upon successor's special election to finish term ending March 4, 1913.	Morris Sheppard (D)	January 29, 1913
Idaho (3)	Kirtland I. Perky (D)	Appointment expired February 5, 1913, upon successor's special election.	James H. Brady (R)	February 6, 1913

=== House of Representatives ===
House vacancies are only filled by elections. State laws regulate when (and if) there will be special elections.

District	Previous	Reason for change	Subsequent	Date of successor's installation
Pennsylvania 2nd	Vacant	Rep-elect Joel Cook died in office December 15, 1910. Seat filled in special election held May 23, 1911.	William S. Reyburn (R)	May 23, 1911
Iowa 9th	Walter I. Smith (R)	Resigned March 15, 1911, after being appointed judge for the United States Court of Appeals for the Eighth Circuit.	William R. Green (R)	June 5, 1911
Kansas 2nd	Alexander C. Mitchell (R)	Died July 7, 1911.	Joseph Taggart (D)	November 7, 1911
Pennsylvania 14th	George W. Kipp (D)	Died July 24, 1911.	William D.B. Ainey (R)	November 7, 1911
Tennessee 10th	George W. Gordon (D)	Died August 9, 1911.	Kenneth McKellar (D)	December 4, 1911
New Jersey 1st	Henry C. Loudenslager (R)	Died August 12, 1911.	William J. Browning (R)	November 7, 1911
Nebraska 3rd	James P. Latta (D)	Died September 11, 1911.	Dan V. Stephens (D)	November 7, 1911
Kansas 7th	Edmond H. Madison (R)	Died September 18, 1911.	George A. Neeley (D)	January 9, 1912
New Mexico Territory at-large	William Henry Andrews (R)	New State January 6, 1912.	seat eliminated	
New Mexico at-large	New seat	New State January 6, 1912.	Harvey B. Fergusson (D)	January 8, 1912
New Mexico at-large	New seat	New State January 6, 1912.	George Curry (R)	January 8, 1912
Arizona Territory At-large	Ralph H. Cameron (R)	New State February 14, 1912.	seat eliminated	
Arizona at-large	New seat	New State February 14, 1912.	Carl Hayden (D)	February 19, 1912
Vermont 1st	David J. Foster (R)	Died March 21, 1912	Frank L. Greene (R)	July 30, 1912
Pennsylvania 1st	Henry H. Bingham (R)	Died March 22, 1912.	William S. Vare (R)	May 24, 1912
Iowa 11th	Elbert H. Hubbard (R)	Died June 4, 1912.	George Cromwell Scott (R)	November 5, 1912
Louisiana 6th	Robert Charles Wickliffe (D)	Died June 11, 1912.	Lewis Lovering Morgan (D)	November 5, 1912
New York 26th	George R. Malby (R)	Died July 5, 1912.	Edwin A. Merritt (R)	November 5, 1912
Missouri 11th	Theron Ephron Catlin (R)	Lost contested election August 12, 1912.	Patrick F. Gill (D)	August 12, 1912
New Jersey 6th	William Hughes (D)	Resigned September 27, 1912, after being appointed to the Passaic County Court of Common Pleas.	Archibald C. Hart (D)	November 5, 1912
Ohio 13th	Carl C. Anderson (D)	Died October 1, 1912.	Seat remained vacant until next Congress	
New York 21st	Richard E. Connell (D)	Died October 30, 1912.	Seat remained vacant until next Congress	
Rhode Island 2nd	George H. Utter (R)	Died November 3, 1912.	Seat remained vacant until next Congress	
Pennsylvania 11th	Charles C. Bowman (R)	Seat declared vacant December 12, 1912.	Seat remained vacant until next Congress	
Pennsylvania 16th	John G. McHenry (D)	Died December 27, 1912.	Seat remained vacant until next Congress	
New York 10th	William Sulzer (D)	Resigned December 31, 1912, after being elected Governor of New York.	Seat remained vacant until next Congress	
Michigan 2nd	William Wedemeyer (R)	Died January 2, 1913.	Seat remained vacant until next Congress	
North Dakota 1st	Louis B. Hanna (R)	Resigned January 7, 1913, after being elected Governor of North Dakota	Seat remained vacant until next Congress	
Ohio 3rd	James M. Cox (D)	Resigned January 12, 1913, after being elected Governor of Ohio	Seat remained vacant until next Congress	
Arkansas 6th	Joseph Taylor Robinson (D)	Resigned January 14, 1913, after being elected Governor of Arkansas	Samuel M. Taylor (D)	January 15, 1913
California 8th	Sylvester C. Smith (R)	Died January 26, 1913.	Seat remained vacant until next Congress	
South Carolina 1st	George S. Legare (D)	Died January 31, 1913.	Seat remained vacant until next Congress	
Texas 1st	J. Morris Sheppard (D)	Resigned February 3, 1913, after being elected to the U.S. Senate	Seat remained vacant until next Congress	

== Committees ==
Lists of committees and their party leaders for members of the House and Senate committees can be found through the Official Congressional Directory at the bottom of this article. The directory after the pages of terms of service lists committees of the Senate, House (Standing with Subcommittees, Select and Special) and Joint and, after that, House/Senate committee assignments. On the committees section of the House and Senate in the Official Congressional Directory, the committee's members on the first row on the left side shows the chairman of the committee and on the right side shows the ranking member of the committee.

=== Senate ===
- Additional Accommodations for the Library of Congress (Select) (Chairman: Josiah W. Bailey; Ranking Member: Shelby M. Cullom)
- Agriculture and Forestry (Chairman: Henry E. Burnham; Ranking Member: John H. Bankhead)
- Appropriations (Chairman: Francis E. Warren; Ranking Member: Benjamin R. Tillman)
- Audit and Control the Contingent Expenses of the Senate (Chairman: Frank O. Briggs; Ranking Member: James P. Clarke)
- Canadian Relations (Chairman: George T. Oliver; Ranking Member: Benjamin R. Tillman)
- Census (Chairman: Robert M. La Follette; Ranking Member: Joseph W. Bailey)
- Civil Service and Retrenchment (Chairman: Albert B. Cummins; Ranking Member: James P. Clarke)
- Claims (Chairman: Coe I. Crawford; Ranking Member: Thomas S. Martin)
- Coast and Insular Survey (Chairman: Charles E. Townsend; Ranking Member: Charles A. Culberson)
- Coast Defenses (Chairman: Charles Curtis; Ranking Member: Furnifold M. Simmons)
- Commerce (Chairman: William P. Frye; Ranking Member: Thomas S. Martin)
- Conservation of National Resources (Chairman: Joseph M. Dixon; Ranking Member: Francis G. Newlands)
- Corporations Organized in the District of Columbia (Chairman: Francis G. Newlands; Ranking Member: Norris Brown)
- Cuban Relations (Chairman: Carroll S. Page; Ranking Member: Furnifold M. Simmons)
- Disposition of Useless Papers in the Executive Departments (Chairman: James P. Clarke; Ranking Member: Henry E. Burnham)
- Distributing Public Revenue Among the States (Select)
- District of Columbia (Chairman: Jacob H. Gallinger; Ranking Member: Thomas S. Martin)
- Education and Labor (Chairman: William E. Borah; Ranking Member: Isidor Rayner then John H. Bankhead)
- Election of William Lorimer (Select)
- Engrossed Bills (Chairman: Furnifold M. Simmons; Ranking Member: Henry Cabot Lodge)
- Enrolled Bills (Chairman: Isaac Stephenson; Ranking Member: Murphy J. Foster)
- Establish a University in the United States (Select)
- Examine the Several Branches in the Civil Service (Chairman: Thomas H. Paynter; Ranking Member: Harry A. Richardson)
- Expenditures in the Department of Agriculture (Chairman: Henry F. Lippitt; Ranking Member: Furnifold M. Simmons)
- Expenditures in the Department of Commerce and Labor (Chairman: Miles Poindexter; Ranking Member: N/A)
- Expenditures in the Interior Department (Chairman: James M. Graham; Ranking Member: Jeff Davis)
- Expenditures in the Department of Justice (Chairman: William O. Bradley; Ranking Member: Joseph W. Bailey)
- Expenditures in the Navy Department (Chairman: Asle J. Gronna; Ranking Member: Thomas S. Martin)
- Expenditures in the Post Office Department (Chairman: Joseph L. Bristow; Ranking Member: Augustus O. Bacon)
- Expenditures in the Department of State (Chairman: William S. Kenyon; Ranking Member: William J. Stone)
- Expenditures in the Treasury Department (Chairman: Theodore E. Burton; Ranking Member: John W. Smith)
- Expenditures in the War Department (Chairman: John D. Works; Ranking Member: Murphy J. Foster Jr.)
- Finance (Chairman: Boies Penrose; Ranking Member: Joseph W. Bailey)
- Fisheries (Chairman: Wesley L. Jones; Ranking Member: Joseph W. Bailey)
- Five Civilized Tribes of Indians (Chairman: Benjamin R. Tillman; Ranking Member: Moses E. Clapp)
- Foreign Relations (Chairman: Shelby M. Cullom; Ranking Member: Augustus O. Bacon)
- Forest Reservations and the Protection of Game (Chairman: George P. McLean; Ranking Member: Benjamin R. Tillman)
- Geological Survey (Chairman: Robert L. Taylor; Ranking Member: Frank O. Briggs)
- Immigration (Chairman: Henry Cabot Lodge; Ranking Member: Jeff Davis)
- Impeachment of Robert H. Archibald (Select)
- Indian Affairs (Chairman: Robert J. Gamble; Ranking Member: William J. Stone)
- Indian Depredations (Chairman: Isidor Rayner then Jeff Davis; Ranking Member: Charles Curtis)
- Industrial Expositions (Chairman: Elihu Root; Ranking Member: Isidor Rayner then Lee S. Overman)
- Interoceanic Canals (Chairman: Frank B. Brandegee; Ranking Member: Furnifold M. Simmons)
- Interstate Commerce (Chairman: Moses E. Clapp; Ranking Member: Benjamin R. Tillman)
- Irrigation and Reclamation (Chairman: George S. Nixon; Ranking Member: Joseph W. Bailey)
- Judiciary (Chairman: Clarence D. Clark; Ranking Member: Augustus O. Bacon)
- Library (Chairman: George P. Wetmore; Ranking Member: Francis G. Newlands)
- Manufactures (Chairman: Weldon B. Heyburn; Ranking Member: Ellison D. Smith)
- Military Affairs (Chairman: Henry A. du Pont; Ranking Member: Murphy J. Foster)
- Mines and Mining (Chairman: William Lorimer; Ranking Member: Benjamin R. Tillman)
- Mississippi River and its Tributaries (Select) (Chairman: Jeff Davis; Ranking Member: Norris Brown)
- National Banks (Chairman: George C. Perkins)
- Naval Affairs (Chairman: George C. Perkins; Ranking Member: Benjamin R. Tillman)
- Pacific Islands and Puerto Rico (Chairman: Harry A. Richardson; Ranking Member: James P. Clarke)
- Pacific Railroads (Chairman: Robert L. Owen; Ranking Member: William A. Smith)
- Patents (Chairman: Norris Brown; Ranking Member: Benjamin F. Shively)
- Pensions (Chairman: Porter J. McCumber; Ranking Member: Robert L. Taylor)
- Philippines (Chairman: Simon Guggenheim; Ranking Member: Joseph F. Johnston)
- Post Office and Post Roads (Chairman: Jonathan Bourne Jr.; Ranking Member: John H. Bankhead)
- Printing (Chairman: Reed Smoot; Ranking Member: John W. Smith)
- Private Land Claims (Chairman: Augustus O. Bacon; Ranking Member: William A. Smith)
- Privileges and Elections (Chairman: William P. Dillingham; Ranking Member: Thomas H. Paynter)
- Public Buildings and Grounds (Chairman: George Sutherland; Ranking Member: Charles A. Culberson)
- Public Health and National Quarantine (Chairman: Charles A. Culberson; Ranking Member: Reed Smoot)
- Public Lands (Chairman: Knute Nelson; Ranking Member: Francis G. Newlands)
- Railroads (Chairman: Thomas P. Gore; Ranking Member: Clarence D. Clark)
- Revision of the Laws (Chairman: Weldon B. Heyburn)
- Revolutionary Claims (Chairman: William J. Stone; Ranking Member: William O. Bradley)
- Rules (Chairman: Winthrop Murray Crane; Ranking Member: Augustus O. Bacon)
- Standards, Weights and Measures (Chairman: John H. Bankhead; Ranking Member: William E. Borah)
- Tariff Regulation (Select)
- Territories (Chairman: William A. Smith; Ranking Member: Robert L. Owen)
- Third Degree Ordeal
- Transportation and Sale of Meat Products (Select) (Chairman: Murphy J. Foster; Ranking Member: Clarence D. Clark)
- Transportation Routes to the Seaboard (Chairman: Ellison D. Smith; Ranking Member: Clarence D. Clark)
- Trespassers upon Indian Lands (Select) (Chairman: John W. Smith; Ranking Member: William O. Bradley)
- Whole
- Woman Suffrage (Chairman: Lee S. Overman; Ranking Member: George P. Wetmore)

=== House of Representatives ===
- Accounts (Chairman: James T. Lloyd; Ranking Member: James A. Hughes)
- Agriculture (Chairman: John Lamb; Ranking Member: Gilbert N. Haugen)
- Alcoholic Liquor Traffic (Chairman: Ezekiel S. Candler Jr.; Ranking Member: Andrew J. Barchfeld)
- Appropriations (Chairman: John J. Fitzgerald; Ranking Member: Joseph G. Cannon)
- American Sugar Refining Company (Special)
- Banking and Currency (Chairman: Arsene P. Pujo; Ranking Member: Edward B. Vreeland)
- Census (Chairman: William C. Houston; Ranking Member: Edgar D. Crumpacker)
- Claims (Chairman: Edward W. Pou; Ranking Member: William H. Heald)
- Coinage, Weights and Measures (Chairman: Thomas W. Hardwick; Ranking Member: William W. Griest)
- Disposition of Executive Papers (Chairman: J. Frederick Cockey Talbott; Ranking Member: George D. McCreary)
- District of Columbia (Chairman: Ben Johnson; Ranking Member: Julius Kahn)
- Education (Chairman: Asbury F. Lever; Ranking Member: James F. Burke)
- Election of the President, Vice President and Representatives in Congress (Chairman: William W. Rucker; Ranking Member: Marlin E. Olmsted)
- Elections No.#1 (Chairman: Timothy T. Ansberry; Ranking Member: Solomon F. Prouty)
- Elections No.#2 (Chairman: James A. Hamill; Ranking Member: John M. Nelson)
- Elections No.#3 (Chairman: Henry M. Goldfogle; Ranking Member: Henry A. Cooper)
- Enrolled Bills (Chairman: Ben Cravens; Ranking Member: Daniel Read Anthony)
- Expenditures in the Agriculture Department (Chairman: Ralph W. Moss; Ranking Member: Edwin W. Higgins)
- Expenditures in the Commerce and Labor Departments (Chairman: John H. Rothermel; Ranking Member: Bird S. McGuire)
- Expenditures in the Interior Department (Chairman: James M. Graham; Ranking Member: Franklin W. Mondell)
- Expenditures in the Justice Department (Chairman: Jack Beall; Ranking Member: Elbert H. Hubbard)
- Expenditures in the Navy Department (Chairman: Rufus Hardy; Ranking Member: William B. McKinley)
- Expenditures in the Post Office Department (Chairman: William A. Ashbrook; Ranking Member: Richard W. Austin)
- Expenditures in the State Department (Chairman: Courtney W. Hamlin; Ranking Member: Charles R. Davis)
- Expenditures in the Treasury Department (Chairman: William E. Cox; Ranking Member: Ebenezer J. Hill)
- Expenditures in the War Department (Chairman: Harvey Helm; Ranking Member: Asher C. Hinds)
- Expenditures on Public Buildings (Chairman: Cyrus Cline; Ranking Member: E. Stevens Henry)
- Foreign Affairs (Chairman: William Sulzer; Ranking Member: William B. McKinley)
- Immigration and Naturalization (Chairman: John L. Burnett; Ranking Member: Augustus P. Gardner)
- Indian Affairs (Chairman: John H. Stephens; Ranking Member: Charles H. Burke)
- Industrial Arts and Expositions (Chairman: J. Thomas Heflin; Ranking Member: William A. Rodenberg)
- Insular Affairs (Chairman: William A. Jones; Ranking Member: Marlin E. Olmsted)
- Interstate and Foreign Commerce (Chairman: William C. Adamson; Ranking Member: Frederick C. Stevens)
- Invalid Pensions (Chairman: Isaac R. Sherwood; Ranking Member: Charles H. Burke)
- Irrigation of Arid Lands (Chairman: William R. Smith; Ranking Member: Moses P. Kinkaid)
- Judiciary (Chairman: Henry De Lamar Clayton; Ranking Member: John A. Sterling)
- Labor (Chairman: William B. Wilson; Ranking Member: John J. Gardner)
- Levees and Improvements of the Mississippi River (Chairman: James L. Slayden; Ranking Member: N/A)
- Merchant Marine and Fisheries (Chairman: Joshua W. Alexander; Ranking Member: William S. Greene)
- Mileage (Chairman: Robert E. Lee; Ranking Member: Charles A. Kennedy)
- Military Affairs (Chairman: James Hay; Ranking Member: George W. Prince)
- Mines and Mining (Chairman: Martin D. Foster; Ranking Member: Joseph Howell)
- Naval Affairs (Chairman: Lemuel P. Padgett; Ranking Member: George Edmund Foss)
- Patents (Chairman: William A. Oldfield; Ranking Member: Frank D. Currier)
- Pensions (Chairman: William Richardson; Ranking Member: Ira W. Wood)
- Post Office and Post Roads (Chairman: John A. Moon; Ranking Member: John W. Weeks)
- Public Buildings and Grounds (Chairman: David E. Finley; Ranking Member: Benjamin K. Focht)
- Public Lands (Chairman: Morris Sheppard; Ranking Member: Franklin W. Mondell)
- Railways and Canals (Chairman: Charles A. Korbly; Ranking Member: Frederick H. Gillett)
- Reform in the Civil Service (Chairman: Charles A. Korbly; Ranking Member: George P. Lawrence)
- Revision of Laws (Chairman: John T. Watkins; Ranking Member: Reuben O. Moon)
- Rivers and Harbors (Chairman: Stephen M. Sparkman; Ranking Member: George P. Lawrence)
- Rules (Chairman: Robert L. Henry; Ranking Member: John Dalzell)
- Standards of Official Conduct
- Territories (Chairman: Henry D. Flood; Ranking Member: Richard E. Connell then William H. Draper)
- War Claims (Chairman: Thetus W. Sims; Ranking Member: Elmer A. Morse)
- Ways and Means (Chairman: Oscar Underwood; Ranking Member: Sereno E. Payne)
- Whole

=== Joint committees ===
- Conditions of Indian Tribes (Special)
- Disposition of (Useless) Executive Papers
- Federal Aid in Construction of Post Roads
- Investigations of Conditions in Alaska (Chairman: Sen. Knute Nelson)
- Investigate the General Parcel Post
- The Library
- Printing (Chairman: Sen. Reed Smoot)
- Postage on 2nd Class Mail Matter and Compensation for Transportation of Mail (Chairman: Sen. Jonathan Bourne Jr.)
- Second Class Mail Matter and Compensation for Rail Mail Service

== Caucuses ==
- Democratic (House)
- Democratic (Senate)

== Employees ==
=== Legislative branch agency directors ===
- Architect of the Capitol: Elliott Woods
- Librarian of Congress: Herbert Putnam
- Public Printer of the United States: Samuel B. Donnelly

=== Senate ===
- Chaplain: Ulysses G.B. Pierce, Unitarian
- Secretary: Charles G. Bennett
- Librarian: Edward C. Goodwin
- Sergeant at Arms: Daniel M. Ransdell, until December 10, 1912
  - E. Livingston Cornelius, elected December 10, 1912

=== House of Representatives ===
- Clerk: Alexander McDowell, until March 3, 1911.
  - South Trimble, from April 4, 1911.
- Chaplain: Henry N. Couden, Universalist
- Clerk at the Speaker's Table: Charles R. Crisp
- Doorkeeper: Joseph J. Sinnott
- Reading Clerks: Patrick Joseph Haltigan (D) and H. Martin Williams (R)
- Postmaster: William M. Dunbar
- Sergeant at Arms: Henry Casson, until April 4, 1911.
  - W. Stokes Jackson, died June 1912.
  - Charles F. Riddell, elected July 18, 1912.

== See also ==
- 1910 United States elections (elections leading to this Congress)
  - 1910–11 United States Senate elections
  - 1910 United States House of Representatives elections
- 1912 United States elections (elections during this Congress, leading to the next Congress)
  - 1912 United States presidential election
  - 1912–13 United States Senate elections
  - 1912 United States House of Representatives elections
