= Pratt Memorial Library =

Public library located in New Milford, Pennsylvania, U.S.

Coordinates: 41.87602°N 75.72705°W

The Pratt Memorial Library is a historic public library located in New Milford, Pennsylvania.

== History ==
The library was opened in 1893 by Mr. Ezra Pratt. It was first located in the front room of a house at 248 Main Street. The house belonged to the principal of the local school, Ulric B. Gillett, and his wife, Addie, was the first librarian. The library contained 1000 volumes donated by Mr. Pratt. It was open once a week and cost 50 cents per year for membership. There was a membership of 200 people by the end of the first year of operation.

Mr. Pratt died in 1898 and his son, Col. Charles Pratt, built the current library building in 1903. The building was made of limestone, had a large copper door, and contained a mechanical clock in the clock tower. In 1922, the Pratt family donated the library to the community and the Pratt Memorial Library Association was formed. In 1952, the clock was replaced with an automatic electric clock which chimed every half-hour.

On July 19, 2003, the library celebrated its 100-year anniversary with an open house. A commemorative booklet was also published, called "The Pratt Memorial Library: Its Origin, Continual Operation and Glorious Centennial Celebration."

== Current uses ==
The Pratt Memorial Library is still located in the original building. It is free to the public, but is not a member of the Susquehanna County library system. It now has two computers available for public use. It provides books, magazines, and audiobooks. A story hour for children is hosted every summer.
