= Charles C. Pratt =

American politician

Charles Clarence Pratt (April 23, 1854 – January 27, 1916) was a Republican member of the U.S. House of Representatives from Pennsylvania.

Pratt was born in New Milford, Pennsylvania to Ezra and Addie Pratt. He attended the rural schools in his community and the Sedgwick Institute in Great Barrington, Massachusetts. He graduated from the State Normal School, Bloomsburg, Pennsylvania. He entered the lumber and oil businesses at New Milford in 1879. He served as assessor, school director, and justice of the peace. He served as colonel on the respective staffs of Governors William A. Stone, Samuel W. Pennypacker, and John K. Tener from 1899 to 1907. In 1903, he built what is now called the Pratt Memorial Library, expanding on the library established by his parents.

Pratt was elected as a Republican to the Sixty-first Congress. He was an unsuccessful candidate for reelection in 1910. He resumed his former business pursuits, residing in Binghamton, New York, during the winters and in New Milford during the summers. He died in Binghamton in 1916, aged 61, and was interred in New Milford Cemetery.

== Sources ==
- United States Congress. "Charles C. Pratt (id: P000496)". Biographical Directory of the United States Congress.
- The Political Graveyard

U.S. House of Representatives
Preceded by George W. Kipp	Member of the U.S. House of Representatives from Pennsylvania's 14th congressional district 1909–1911	Succeeded by George W. Kipp
