= J. P. Morgan =

American financier, banker, and art collector (1837–1913)

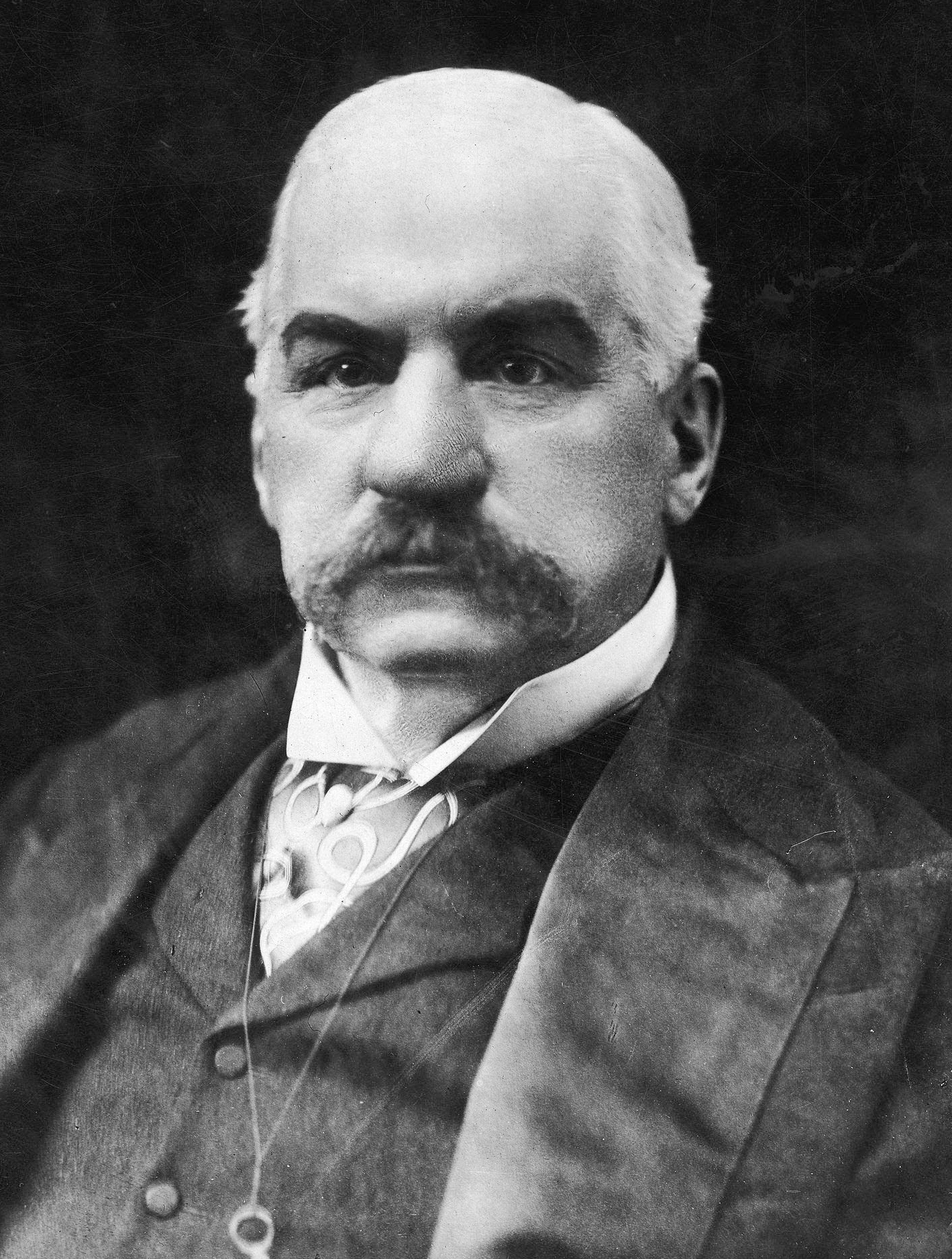
- Morgan in 1902
- Born: John Pierpont Morgan; April 17, 1837; Hartford, Connecticut, U.S.
- Died: March 31, 1913 (aged 75); Rome, Lazio, Italy
- Resting place: Cedar Hill Cemetery; Hartford, Connecticut, U.S.
- Education: University of Göttingen
- Occupations: Banker; Art & Book Collector
- Known for: Founding and leading J.P. Morgan & Co. Financing the creation of American Bridge, General Electric; International Harvester; International Mercantile Marine; Southern Railway and U.S. Steel Organizing the Morgan "money trust" which owned Aetna, General Electric, International Mercantile Marine Company, Pullman Palace Car Company, U.S. Steel, Western Union, and 21 railroads
- Board member of: Northern Pacific Railway, New Haven Railroad, Pennsylvania Railroad, Pullman Palace Car Company, Western Union, New York Central Railroad, Albany & Susquehanna Railroad, Aetna, General Electric and U.S. Steel
- Spouses: Amelia Sturges (m. 1861; died 1862) Frances Louise Tracy (m. 1865)
- Children: 4; including Jack and Anne
- Father: Junius Spencer Morgan
- Family: Morgan

Signature
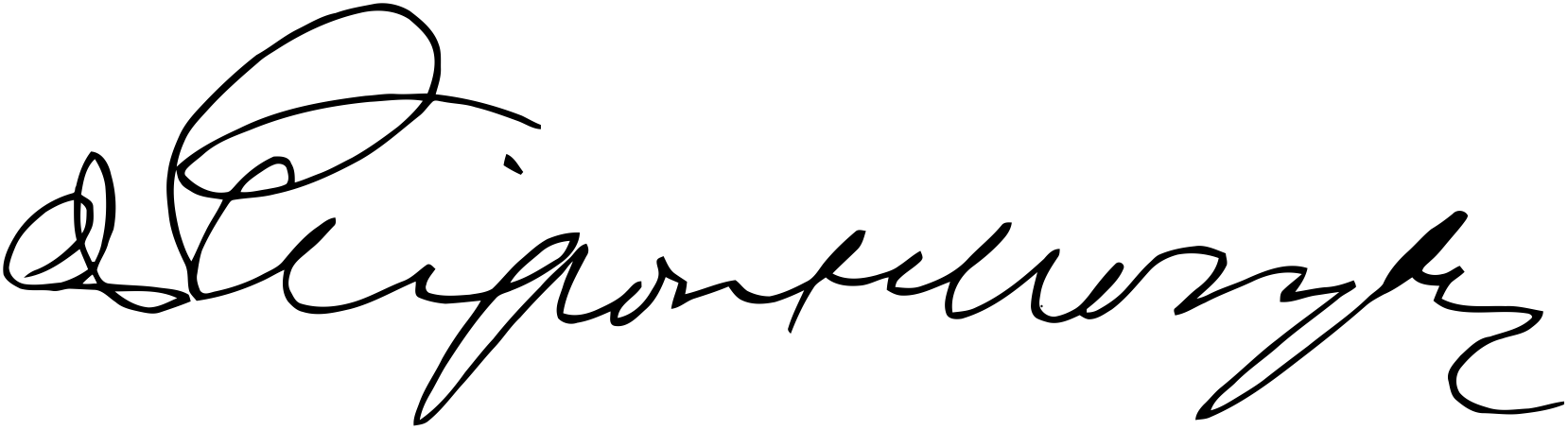

John Pierpont Morgan Sr. (April 17, 1837 – March 31, 1913) was an American financier and investment banker who dominated corporate finance on Wall Street throughout the Gilded Age and Progressive Era. As the head of the banking firm that ultimately became known as JPMorgan Chase & Co., he was driving the force behind a wave of industrial consolidations in the United States at the turn of the twentieth century.

Over the course of his career on Wall Street, Morgan spearheaded the formation of several prominent multinational corporations including U.S. Steel, International Harvester, and General Electric. He and his partners also held controlling interests in numerous other American businesses including Aetna, Western Union, the Pullman Car Company, and 21 railroads. His grandfather Joseph Morgan was one of the co-founders of Aetna. Through his holdings, Morgan exercised enormous influence over capital markets in the United States. During the Panic of 1907, he organized a coalition of financiers that saved the American monetary system from collapse.

As the Progressive Era's leading banker, Morgan's dedication to efficiency and modernization helped transform the shape of the American economy. Adrian Wooldridge characterized Morgan as America's "greatest banker". Morgan died in Rome, Italy, in his sleep in 1913 at the age of 75, leaving his fortune and business to his son, J. P. Morgan Jr.. Biographer Ron Chernow estimated his fortune at $80 million (equivalent to $1.9 billion in 2025).

== Childhood and education ==
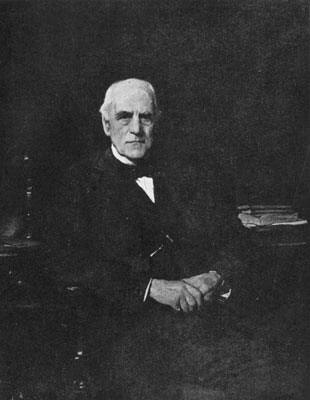
His father Junius Spencer Morgan guided his son's early career and established the Morgan banking house with offices in London, New York, Philadelphia, and Paris.

John Pierpont Morgan was born on April 17, 1837, in Hartford, Connecticut, to Junius Spencer Morgan (1813–1890), of the influential Morgan family, and Juliet Pierpont (1816–1884). His father, Junius, was then a partner at Howe Mather & Co., the largest dry goods wholesaler in Hartford. His mother Juliet was the daughter of the poet John Pierpont. His uncle James Lord Pierpont composed the famous Christmas song Jingle Bells. Morgan preferred to be called "Pierpont", as opposed to "John".

In 1847, when Morgan was ten years old, his grandfather Joseph Morgan died and left the family a large fortune.

Pierpont was educated in public and private schools in New England, where he attended West Middle School and Cheshire Academy. Junius soon became a senior partner at the rechristened Mather Morgan & Co. In September 1851, he passed the entrance exam for The English High School of Boston, which specialized in mathematics for careers in commerce. In April 1852, he suffered from rheumatic fever, an illness whose symptoms became more severe as his life progressed and ultimately left him in such pain that he could not walk. Junius sent him to the Azores to recover. He convalesced there for almost a year, then returned to Boston to resume his studies. In 1856, his father sent him to Bellerive, a school in the Swiss village of La Tour-de-Peilz, where he gained fluency in French. His father then sent him to the University of Göttingen to improve his German. He attained passable fluency and a degree in art history within six months, completing his studies in 1857.

== J.S. Morgan & Co.: 1858–1871 ==
After completing his education, Morgan went to London in August 1857 to join his father, now a partner in the merchant banking firm George Peabody & Co. (Note: The firm was later renamed J.S. Morgan & Co. upon George Peabody's retirement in 1864.) For the next fourteen years, he worked as his father's American representative in a series of affiliated New York City banking houses, learning the trade and lifestyle of a bank partner: Duncan, Sherman & Company (1858–1861), his own firm J. Pierpont Morgan & Co. (1861–1864), and finally Dabney Morgan (1864–1872). Dabney, Morgan & Company was co-founded by Charles H. Dabney and Jim Goodwin.

=== Duncan, Sherman & Company: 1858–1861 ===
Morgan soon moved on to New York City to begin work at Duncan Sherman as a junior clerk. Through his father's reputation and his position as the obvious successor to the Peabody house, he was among the most sought-after young men on Wall Street and enjoyed the company of many of New York's leading citizens. Morgan held a great deal of independence in both his investment decisions and lifestyle, owing partly to his father's faith in Morgan's austere religious discipline. "Remember," J.S. Morgan wrote his son, "that there is an Eye above that is ever upon you and that for every act, word, and deed you will one day be called to give account." He adopted a serious, energetic approach to his work and was praised by his father's friends for his work ethic and capacity for business.

At the time Morgan entered the firm, Peabody & Co. was struggling in the wake of the Panic of 1857, a rash of business failures which dramatically damaged investor confidence in American securities. Peabody & Co., whose business was focused on the United States, was particularly threatened when a few of its American correspondent banks were forced to suspend operations. The house's creditors, including Baring Brothers, demanded payment; Peabody defied them, daring his rivals to put him out of business, and turned to the Bank of England for a loan in November 1857. Morgan himself expressed surprise that the famed Barings house was not more accommodating. The loan secured the house's survival and the London office was stabilized, but Duncan Sherman came under criticism on Wall Street, and the Mercantile Agency recommended its dissolution. J. P. Morgan urged his father to stand by Duncan Sherman in the face of "outrageous" reports "of Browns & Barings getting the credit for what they never did".

While at Duncan Sherman, Morgan acquired experience in the financing and reorganization of railroads, including the major Ohio & Mississippi and Illinois Central lines, for which he personally negotiated the loans. Most of his work involved collecting and transmitting interest and dividend payments, executing orders on the New York Stock Exchange, and conducting credit checks on mercantile houses doing business with Peabody & Co.

Starting in early January 1859, Morgan spent several months in the South to visit the firm's correspondents in Georgia, Alabama, and Louisiana and to improve his knowledge of the cotton trade. He briefly visited Cuba, where he developed a lifelong taste for Cuban cigars. Most of his time in the South was spent in New Orleans, a leading cotton export hub. He received a stern warning from Duncan Sherman when he conducted an unauthorized trade of coffee at a profit, which he considered his first totally independent transaction. Later that summer, he visited his father in London. They discussed the prospects of Morgan's going into business for himself, and Morgan courted Amelia Sturges, whom he later married.

=== J. Pierpont Morgan & Co.: 1861–1864 ===
As the American Civil War began, business slowed, delaying Morgan's efforts to open his own office. He opened J. Pierpont Morgan & Company some time between April and July 1861, conducting operations out of a one-room office at 53 Exchange Place. As he anticipated, most of his business was for his father and consistent with the work he had managed at Duncan Sherman. Morgan avoided serving during the war by paying a substitute $300 to take his place.

The Civil War radically altered Morgan's focus by virtually eliminating his cotton business and drastically reducing iron imports for American railroads in favor of securities and foreign exchange operations. The Morgans, trading through J. P.'s New York office, made a large profit in the purchase and sale of Union bonds once the Battle of Antietam turned the war in the Union's favor. The Morgans also expanded their trade in European securities during a period of industrial expansion, financed by a large deposit from W. W. Corcoran after he liquidated his American holdings out of sympathy for the Confederate cause.

Morgan also profited in gold after specie payments were suspended in 1862; its price was largely pegged to the possibility of a Union victory. In October 1863, he and Edward B. Ketchum transferred $1.15 million (equivalent to $23.6 million in 2025) in gold to England, forcing a price spike and allowing both men to sell their holdings at a large profit. Critics have long considered the deal a speculative effort to corner the American gold market and evidence of Morgan's insensitivity to the nation's financial situation, although the economic consequences were ultimately minor.

In 1862, Morgan made his cousin, James Goodwin, a partner. The firm received a serious boost when Morgan's father succeeded George Peabody as head of the London office. J.S. Morgan transferred all of the firm's remaining commercial credit and securities accounts from Duncan Sherman, and by the end of 1862, J. Pierpont Morgan & Co. was considered one of the stronger private banking houses on Wall Street.

==== Hall Carbine Affair ====
In August 1861, Morgan loaned $20,000 (equivalent to $720,000 in 2025) to Simon Stevens, a well-connected New York City attorney and former secretary to Thaddeus Stevens. Stevens used the money to purchase 5000 carbine rifles for resale to General John C. Frémont, commander of the Department of the West. The carbines in question were developed by John H. Hall and manufactured by Simeon North, purchased by the U.S. government, and resold to arms dealer Arthur M. Eastman for $3.50 each in June 1861 (equivalent to $125 in 2025). After the Union defeat at Bull Run placed a premium on arms, Stevens used the Morgan loan to purchase the rifles from Eastman at $11.50 each and immediately resold them to Frémont, a longtime acquaintance, at $22 each.

During the 38-day duration of the loan, Morgan held title to the carbines and assumed responsibility for having their barrels replaced with rifled ones before shipment to Frémont. Stevens approached Morgan for another loan, which Morgan refused, instead asking Stevens for the $20,000 on the original loan and attempting to remove himself from the transaction. On September 14, Morgan received $55,000 from the Army for the carbines, deducted the face value of the loan plus expenses and interest, and passed the remainder to Stevens.

By September, when Morgan received payment, the deal was already controversial. Military officials felt Frémont had overpaid, and an 1863 report by the United States House Select Committee on Government Contracts indicted the profiteers as "worse than traitors in arms". Though Morgan was neither criticized nor censured during contemporary investigations, his name remained connected with the Hall Carbine Affair for many years.

Debate over Morgan's knowledge and involvement became a cause célèbre within his lifetime, attracting a wide range of commentary, and the debate has persisted long after his death. Interest in Morgan's role in the affair was rekindled in 1910 with the publication of Gustavus Myers' History of the Great American Fortunes. Myers claimed the rifles were more likely to blow the rifleman's thumb off than they were to cause any damage to the enemy. An earlier version of the carbine rifle was known to be subject to this problem. R. Gordon Wasson, later the head of public relations for J.P. Morgan & Co., argued that there was no evidence Morgan knew that he was participating in a scheme to profit. Vincent Carosso, author of an academic history of the Morgan house, concurs that Stevens "used Morgan's name" to cover his greed and that "none of the evidence suggested that Morgan himself had been a party to the shabby contract or had participated in its profits," though he "failed to exercise the care and caution that he had demonstrated two years earlier in the New Orleans coffee deal". Matthew Josephson, who popularized the term "robber baron", asserted that Morgan certainly did know of the scheme, because he had presented the government with a bill for $58,175 before he delivered the remaining rifles that were being held as collateral. Reviewing the evidence, Charles Morris also concluded that it was "implausible" that Morgan did not know about the source of his profits.

=== Dabney, Morgan & Co.: 1864–1872 ===
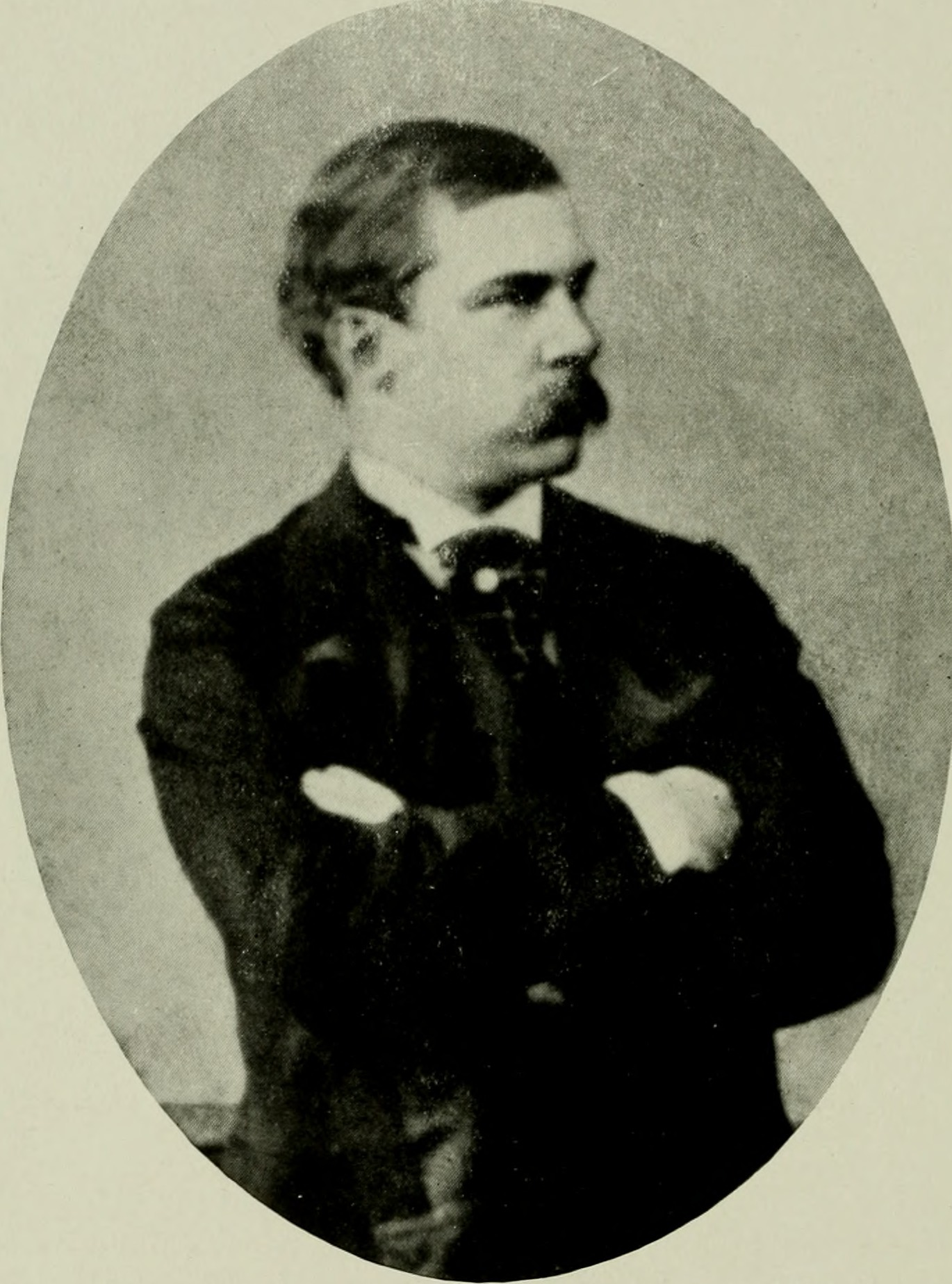
Morgan photographed c. 1870

On October 1, 1864, George Peabody retired completely from the rechristened J. S. Morgan & Co. and agreed to reinvest his share of the partnership with the firm. In an effort to expand the business internationally, Junius Morgan hired Dabney on November 15 as a senior partner. Dabney, a fifty-seven-year-old partner at Duncan Sherman, was widely respected in the business community for his accounting skill and integrity. In the reconfigured firm, J. P. Morgan took on primary responsibility for recruiting new business.

Both Dabney Morgan and J.S. Morgan & Co. remained focused on merchant banking and commodities into the 1870s. Between 1863 and 1873, the firm's profits from its securities business only exceeded its commissions on trade in 1865. Dabney Morgan traded globally in a variety of commodities, including iron rails, American cotton, Philippine tobacco, Brazilian coffee, and Peruvian guano. Beginning on the advice of Levi P. Morton in 1865, J. P. Morgan secured an exclusive four-year contract with the Peruvian government to export guano, used in the production of fertilizer and gunpowder, at a two-and-a-half percent commission.

To the extent the firm engaged in securities trading, the focus was railroad stock and government bonds. However, railroad construction had halted during the Civil War. Construction did not recover until after 1867, when the firm of Jay Cooke & Company in Philadelphia dominated in getting American government financing. In 1866, J. S. Morgan & Co. did make a "considerable sum" selling shares of the Atlantic Telegraph Company after the trans-Atlantic telegraph wire was laid. Despite this success, the firm's creditor, Brown Shipley, declined to expand Morgan's line of credit, stating the company was no better than a speculative trader in securities.

== Drexel Morgan & Co.: 1871–1895 ==
In 1871, at the behest of J.S. Morgan, the Philadelphia financier Anthony Joseph Drexel became J. P.'s mentor. They formed Drexel Morgan & Co. This new merchant banking partnership, based in New York, served as an agent for European investment in the United States and assumed the leading role in financing America's railroads and stabilizing and revitalizing American securities markets. The firm created a national capital market for industrial companies, which had previously existed only for railroads and canals. Drexel Morgan also played an important role in government finance. To restore investor confidence, Drexel Morgan underwrote the pay of the entire U.S. Army in 1877 and bailed out the U.S. government in 1895 during the Panic of 1893.

=== Railroad investments and management ===
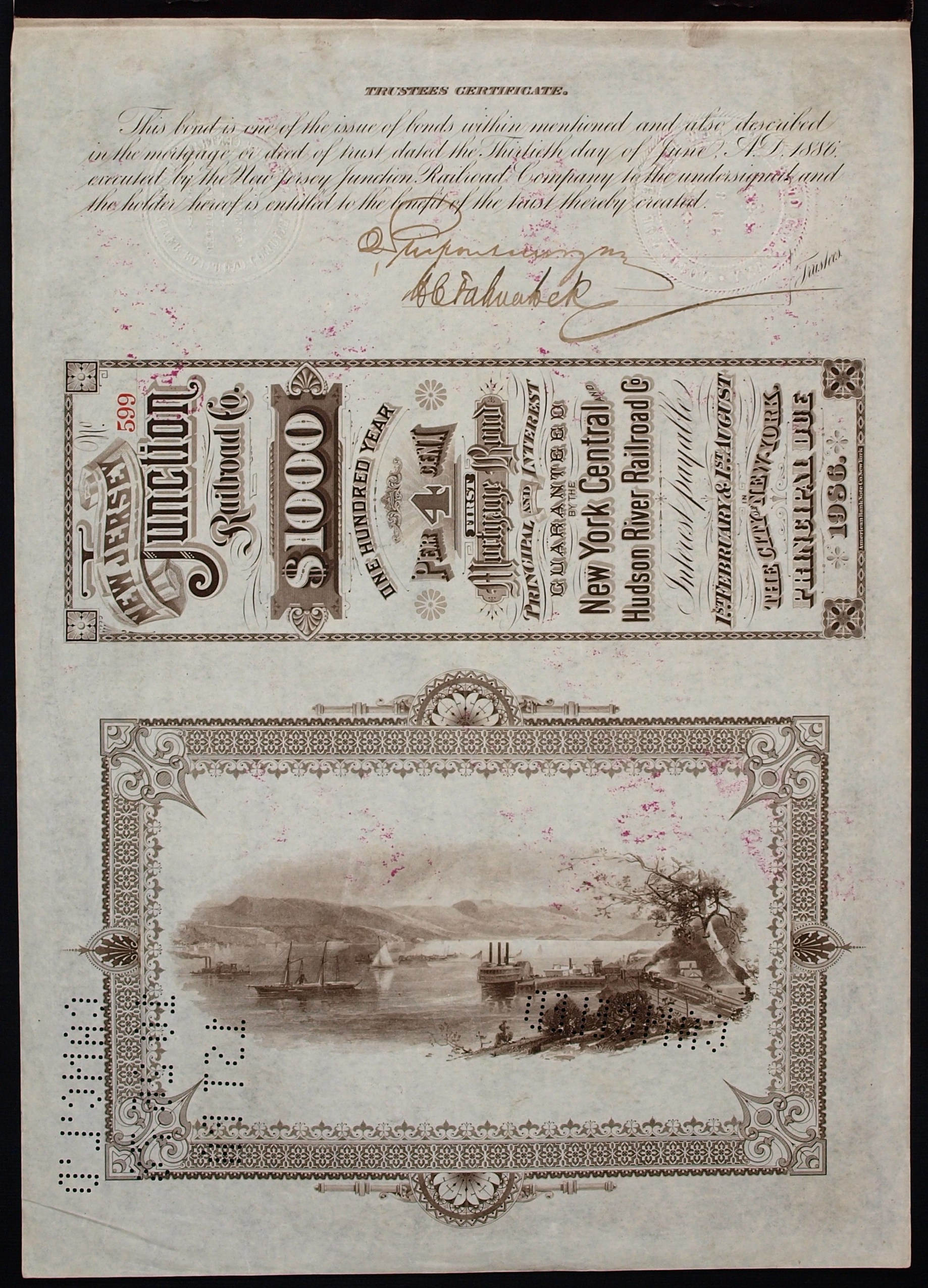
Bond of the New Jersey Junction Railroad Company, issued 30. June 1886, reverse side with signatures of John Pierpont Morgan and Harris C. Fahnestock as trustees

In his ascent to power, Morgan focused on America's largest business enterprises: railroads. He led the syndicate that broke the government-financing privileges of Jay Cooke and developed and financed a national railroad empire by reorganization and consolidation. He raised large sums in Europe, and especially through the American rails section of the London Stock Exchange. Rather than participating solely as a financier, he actively managed and reorganized the railroad corporations, increasing efficiency and acting as an early pioneer in the practice of private equity investing, a process that became known as "Morganization".

In 1883, Morgan successfully marketed a large part of William H. Vanderbilt's New York Central holdings. In 1885, he reorganized the New York, West Shore & Buffalo Railroad and leased it to the New York Central. In 1887, Congress passed the Interstate Commerce Act. Morgan set up industry conferences in 1889 and 1890 which paved the way for a wave of consolidations in the early 20th century. In an unprecedented move, he brought together railroad presidents to follow the new laws and write agreements for the maintenance of "public, reasonable, uniform and stable rates". The first of their kind, the conferences created a community of interest among competing lines, paving the way for the great consolidations of the early 20th century.

== J.P. Morgan & Company: 1895–1913 ==
After the death of Anthony Drexel, the firm was renamed J. P. Morgan & Company in 1895, retaining close ties with Drexel & Company of Philadelphia; Morgan, Harjes & Company of Paris; and J.S. Morgan & Company (after 1910 Morgan, Grenfell & Company) of London. By 1900, it was one of the world's most powerful banking houses, focused primarily on reorganizations and consolidations.

Morgan had many partners over the years, such as George Walbridge Perkins, but always remained firmly in charge. His international reputation as a financier began to draw investors to the businesses that he took over.

=== Panic of 1893 and election of 1896 ===
At the depths of the Panic of 1893, around 1895, the U.S. Treasury nearly depleted its gold reserves. Morgan put forward a plan for the federal government to buy gold from his and European banks, but it was declined in favor of a plan to sell government bonds directly to the general public. Morgan demanded a meeting with President Grover Cleveland, where he claimed the United States government could default that day if action was not taken.

Morgan came up with a plan to use an old Civil War statute that allowed Morgan and the Rothschilds to sell 3.5 million ounces of gold directly to the U.S. Treasury in exchange for a 30-year bond issue. The episode saved the Treasury but hurt Cleveland's standing with the populist agrarian wing of the Democratic Party, ensuring his political career was over. In the 1896 United States presidential election, bankers came under a withering attack from William Jennings Bryan, and Morgan was among many who donated heavily to Republican William McKinley.

=== Nikola Tesla's Wardenclyffe station: 1900 ===
In 1900, the inventor Nikola Tesla convinced Morgan he could build a trans-Atlantic wireless communication system based on his theories of Earth and atmospheric electrical conduction (eventually sited at Wardenclyffe) that would outperform the short-range radio wave-based wireless telegraph system then being demonstrated by Guglielmo Marconi. In what may have been a philanthropic investment, Morgan gave Tesla $150,000 (equivalent to $4.8 million in 2025) to build the system and Tesla offered him a 51% control of the patents. Almost as soon as the letter of agreement was signed, Tesla decided to scale up the facility to include his ideas of terrestrial wireless power transmission to make what he thought was a more competitive system. Morgan refused to give Tesla any further money towards the project and, with Tesla unable to secure further investment capital, Wardenclyffe's development stalled and the site was abandoned by 1906.

=== Northern Securities: 1901–1904 ===
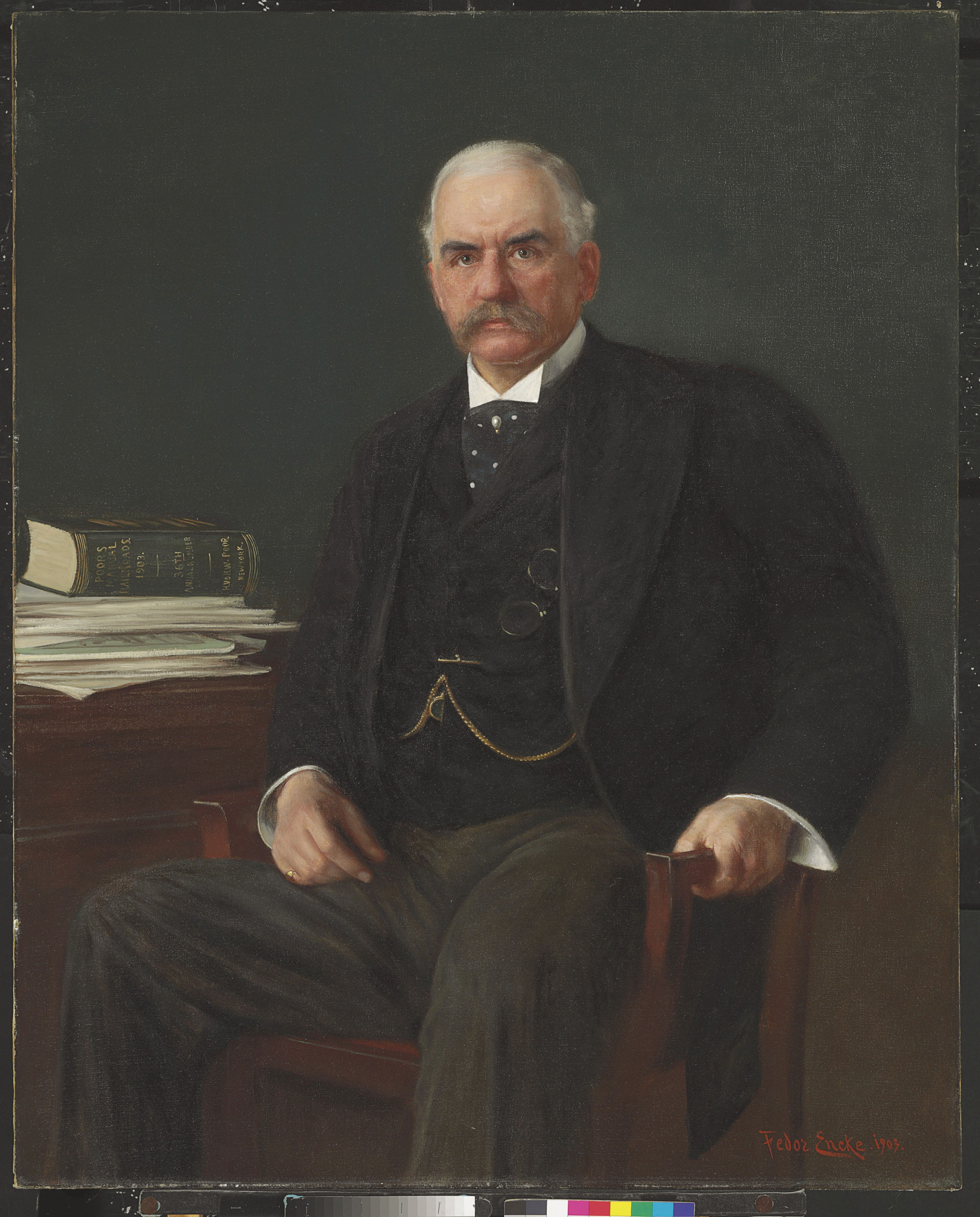
Portrait of J. P. Morgan; Cutthroat Capitalist –Oil on canvas by Fedor Encke, 1903

The Northern Pacific Railway went bankrupt in the Panic of 1893. The bankruptcy wiped out the railroad's bondholders, leaving it free of debt, and a complex financial battle for its control ensued. In 1901, a compromise was reached between Morgan, New York financier E. H. Harriman and Minnesota railroad builder James J. Hill. To reduce competition in the Midwest, they created the Northern Securities Company to merge three of the region's most important railways: the Northern Pacific Railway, the Great Northern Railway, and the Chicago, Burlington and Quincy Railroad. The parties ran into unexpected opposition from President Theodore Roosevelt, who considered the merger bad for consumers and a violation of the seldom enforced Sherman Antitrust Act of 1890. In 1902, Roosevelt ordered Attorney General Philander Knox to sue to break it up. In 1904, the Supreme Court dissolved the Northern Security company; though Morgan did not lose money, his all-powerful political reputation suffered.

=== U.S. Steel: 1901–1913 ===
In 1900, Morgan began talks to purchase Andrew Carnegie's steel business and merge it with several other steel, coal, mining and shipping firms. After financing the creation of the Federal Steel Company, Morgan merged it with the Carnegie Steel Company and several other steel and iron businesses (including William Edenbirn's Consolidated Steel and Wire Company) in 1901, forming the United States Steel Corporation. U.S. Steel was the world's first billion-dollar company, with an authorized capitalization of $1.4 billion, much larger than any other industrial firm and comparable in size to the largest railroads.

U.S. Steel's goals were to achieve greater economies of scale, reduce transportation and resource costs, expand product lines, and improve distribution to allow the United States to compete globally with the United Kingdom and Germany. U.S. Steel president Charles M. Schwab and others claimed the company's size would enable it to be more aggressive and effective in pursuing distant international markets. Critics regarded U.S. Steel as a monopoly, as it sought to dominate not only steel, but also the construction of bridges, ships, railroad cars, rails, wire, nails, and many other products. With U.S. Steel, Morgan captured two-thirds of the steel market, and Schwab was confident that the company would soon hold a 75% market share.

U.S. Steel also faced criticism for its labor policies. U.S. Steel was non-union and used aggressive tactics to identify and root out pro-union "troublemakers". The lawyers and bankers who had organized the merger, including Morgan, were more concerned with long-range profits, stability, good public relations, and avoiding trouble. His views generally prevailed, and the result was a "paternalistic" labor policy.

=== Failed London Underground line: 1902 ===
Morgan suffered a rare business defeat in 1902 when he attempted to build and operate a line on the London Underground. Transit magnate Charles Tyson Yerkes thwarted Morgan's effort to obtain parliamentary authority to build the Piccadilly, City and North East London Railway, a subway line that would have competed with "tube" lines controlled by Yerkes. Morgan called Yerkes' coup "the greatest rascality and conspiracy I ever heard of".

=== International Mercantile Marine and RMS Titanic: 1902–1913 ===
In 1902, J.P. Morgan & Co. financed the formation of International Mercantile Marine Co. (IMMC), an Atlantic shipping company which absorbed several major American and British lines, in an attempt to monopolize the shipping trade. Morgan hoped to dominate transatlantic shipping through interlocking directorates and contractual arrangements with the railroads, but that proved impossible because of the unscheduled nature of sea transport, American antitrust legislation, and an agreement with the British government.

Morgan had booked a luxury suite with a private promenade deck on the RMS Titanic and scheduled to sail on the ill-fated maiden voyage of the ship, which was owned by an IMMC subsidiary, White Star Line, but those plans were later changed. The ship's famous sinking was a financial disaster for IMMC. Analysis of financial records shows that IMMC was over-leveraged and suffered from inadequate cash flow causing it to default on bond interest payments. (Note: After Morgan's death, the IMMC was forced to apply for bankruptcy protection in 1915. Its fortunes were saved by World War I, and it eventually re-emerged as the United States Lines, which went bankrupt in 1986.)

In response to the sinking, Morgan purportedly said:

Monetary losses amount to nothing in life. It is the loss of life that counts. It is that frightful death.

=== Panic of 1907 ===
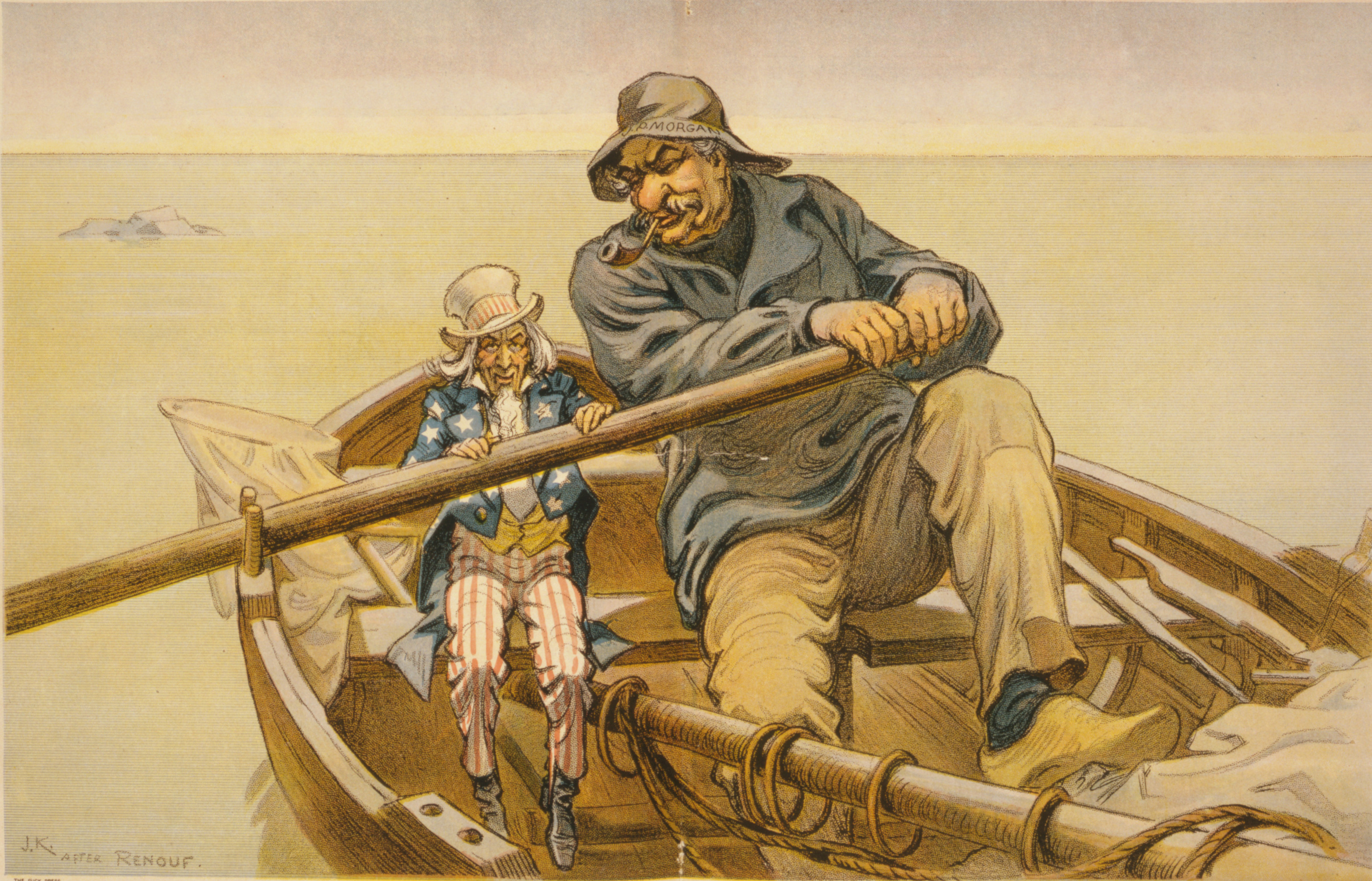
Morgan's overpowering role in the American economy was demonstrated in this political cartoon.

The Panic of 1907 was a financial crisis that almost crippled the American economy. Major New York banks were on the verge of bankruptcy and there was no mechanism to rescue them, until Morgan stepped in to help resolve the crisis. To ease the crisis, Secretary of the Treasury George B. Cortelyou earmarked $35 million of federal money to deposit in New York banks. Morgan then met with the nation's leading financiers in his New York mansion, where he forced them to devise a plan to meet the crisis. James Stillman, president of the National City Bank, also played a central role. Morgan organized a team of bank and trust executives which redirected money between banks, secured further international lines of credit, and bought up the plummeting stocks of healthy corporations.

A delicate issue arose regarding the brokerage firm of Moore and Schley, which was deeply invested in the Tennessee Coal, Iron and Railroad Company (TCI). Moore and Schley had used over $6 million of TCI stock as collateral for loans to Wall Street banks, which the firm now could not pay. If Moore and Schley failed, it could precipitate a larger crisis. Thus, Morgan proposed merging the TCI with U.S. Steel, one of its chief competitors.

U.S. Steel president Elbert Gary agreed, but was concerned that antitrust implications could obstruct the merger. Morgan sent Gary to see President Theodore Roosevelt, who promised legal immunity for the deal. U.S. Steel thereupon paid $30 million for the TCI stock and Moore and Schley was saved. The announcement had an immediate effect; by November 7, 1907, the panic was over.

=== Criticisms and investigations ===
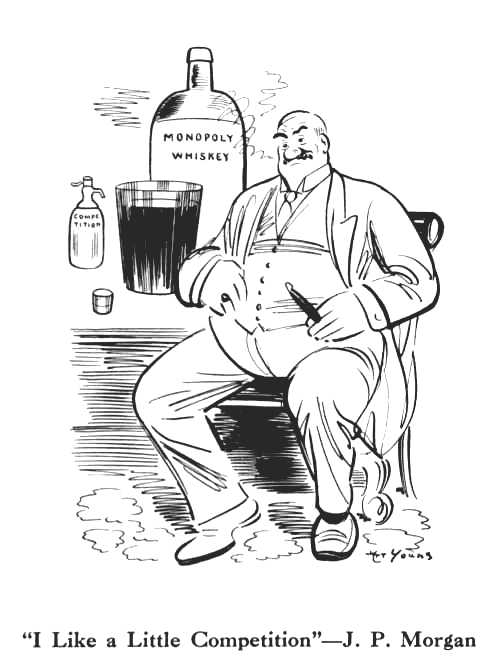
"I Like a Little Competition"—J. P. Morgan, pen and ink by Art Young, relating to the answer Morgan gave to the Pujo Committee in 1912, when asked whether he disliked competition

While conservatives hailed Morgan for civic responsibility, strengthening the national economy, and devotion to the arts and religion, critics of banking and consolidation viewed him as one of the leading figures in the system they rejected. They attacked Morgan for the terms of his 1895 loan of gold to the U.S. Treasury. Many, including writer Upton Sinclair, attacked him for his handling of the Panic of 1907.

In December 1912, Morgan testified before the Pujo Committee, a subcommittee of the House Banking and Currency committee. The committee ultimately concluded that a small number of financial leaders was exercising considerable control over many industries. The partners of J.P. Morgan & Co. and directors of First National and National City Bank controlled aggregate resources of $22.245 billion, which Louis Brandeis compared to the value of all the property in the twenty-two states west of the Mississippi River.

In the early 2000s, an investigation by historian James Lide discovered that through parts of its business, JPMorgan Chase accepted thousands of slaves as collateral on loans made to plantation owners in the early 19th century, and that it ended up owning several hundred slaves. The banks in question, Citizens' Bank and Canal Bank, both now part of JPMorgan, served plantations from the 1830s until the American Civil War, and sometimes took ownership of slaves when the plantation owners defaulted on loans. JPMorgan estimated that between 1831 and 1865, the two banks accepted approximately 13,000 slaves as collateral and ended up owning about 1,250 slaves. An apology was made in compliance with a rule requiring companies to detail past dealings with the slave trade when doing business with the city of Chicago.

== List of Morgan corporations ==
From 1890 to 1913, 42 major corporations were organized or their securities were underwritten, in whole or part, by J.P. Morgan and Company.

=== Manufacturing and construction industry ===
- Aetna Inc.
- American Bridge Company
- American Can Company
- American Telephone & Telegraph
- Atlas Portland Cement Company
- Boomer Coal & Coke
- Consolidated Edison
- DuPont
- Federal Steel Company
- General Electric
- General Motors
- Hartford Carpet Corporation
- Inspiration Consolidated Copper Company
- International Harvester
- International Mercantile Marine
- International Telephone & Telegraph
- J. I. Case Threshing Machine
- Kennecott Copper
- National Tube
- Montgomery Ward
- Pullman Car Company
- United Dry Goods
- United States Steel Corporation
- Western Union

=== Railroads ===
- Atchison, Topeka and Santa Fe Railway
- Atlantic Coast Line
- Baltimore and Ohio Railroad
- Central of Georgia Railway
- Chesapeake and Ohio Railway
- Chicago and Western Indiana Railroad
- Chicago, Burlington and Quincy
- Chicago Great Western Railway
- Chicago, Indianapolis & Louisville Railroad
- Elgin, Joliet and Eastern Railway
- Erie Railroad
- Florida East Coast Railway
- Great Northern Railway
- Hocking Valley Railway
- Jersey Central Railroad
- Lehigh Valley Railroad
- Louisville and Nashville Railroad
- New York Central System
- New York, New Haven and Hartford Railroad
- New York, Ontario and Western Railway
- New York, Susquehanna and Western Railway
- Nickel Plate Road
- Northern Pacific Railway
- Pennsylvania Railroad
- Pere Marquette Railroad
- Reading Railroad
- St. Louis–San Francisco Railway
- Southern Railway
- Terminal Railroad Association of St. Louis

== Personal life ==
=== Marriages and children ===
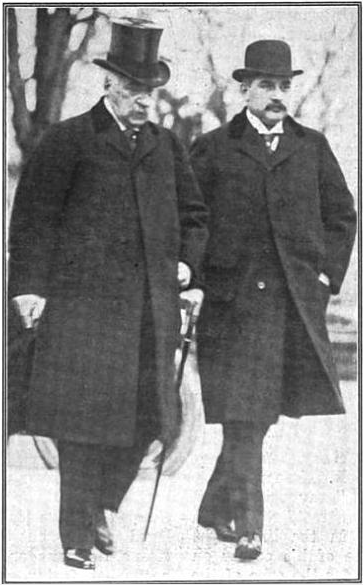
J. P. Morgan walking alongside his son in the last known photograph of the two together (c. 1913)

In October 1861, Morgan married Amelia "Memi" Sturges (1835–1862) at her home on 5 East Fourteenth Street. He had courted her for two years, and when they married, Memi was already seriously ill with tuberculosis. Morgan had to carry her to the drawing room for a small private ceremony and afterwards to the carriage which took them to the pier. They traveled to Algiers, where he hoped the warm climate would restore their health, but it did not, and she died in Nice in February 1862, four months and ten days after their marriage.

On May 31, 1865, Morgan married Frances Louisa "Fanny" Tracy (1842–1924), whom he met at St. George's Church. They had four children:

- Louisa Pierpont Morgan (1866–1946), who married Herbert L. Satterlee (1863–1947)
- J. P. Morgan Jr. (1867–1943), who succeeded his father and married Jane Norton Grew
- Juliet Pierpont Morgan (1870–1952), who married William Pierson Hamilton (1869–1950), a grandson of John Church Hamilton
- Anne Tracy Morgan (1873–1952), philanthropist

=== Appearance ===
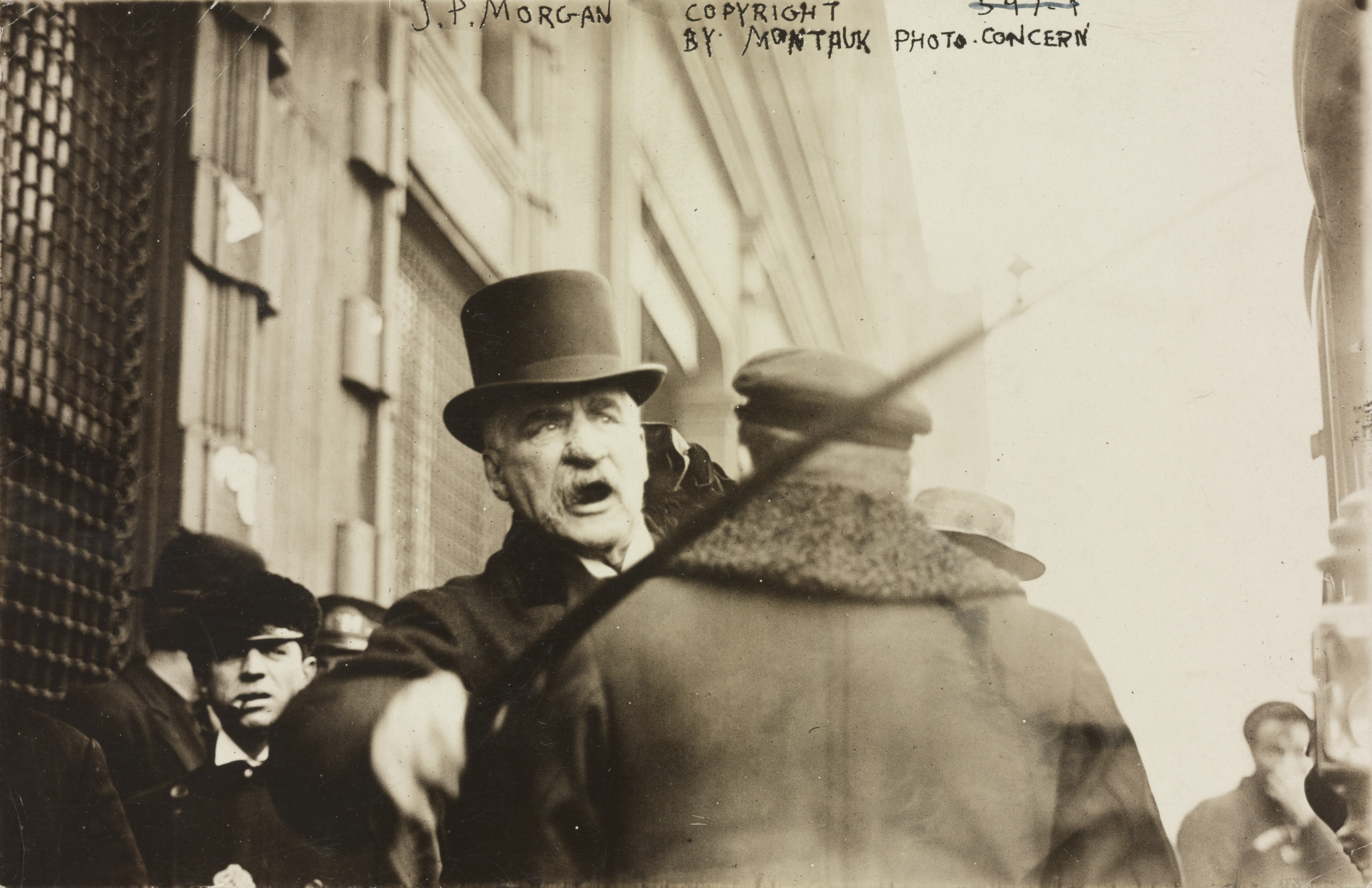
Morgan hitting a photographer with his cane; he was self-conscious about his rosacea and hated being photographed without permission.

Morgan often had a tremendous physical effect on people; one man said that a visit from Morgan left him feeling "as if a gale had blown through the house". He was physically large with massive shoulders, piercing eyes, and a purple nose. He was known to dislike publicity and hated being photographed without his permission; as a result of his self-consciousness of his rosacea, all of his professional portraits were retouched. His deformed nose was due to a disease called rhinophyma, which can result from rosacea. As the deformity worsens, pits, nodules, fissures, lobulations, and pedunculation contort the nose. This condition inspired the taunt "Johnny Morgan's nasal organ has a purple hue." Surgeons could have shaved away the rhinophymous growth of sebaceous tissue during Morgan's lifetime, but as a child he suffered from infantile seizures, and Morgan's son-in-law, Herbert L. Satterlee, has speculated that he did not seek surgery for his nose because he feared the seizures would return.

His social and professional self-confidence were too well established to be undermined by this affliction. It appeared as if he dared people to meet him squarely and not shrink from the sight, asserting the force of his character over the appearance of his face.

Morgan smoked dozens of cigars per day and favored large Havana cigars dubbed Hercules' Clubs by observers.

=== Religion ===
Morgan was a lifelong member of the Episcopal Church, and by 1890 was one of its most influential leaders. He was a founding member of the Church Club of New York, an Episcopal private member's club in Manhattan. Morgan was appointed as one of the first laymen on the committee that created the 1892 revision of the Book of Common Prayer, where he petitioned for the creation of a special limited collectible printing that he later financed. In 1910, the General Convention of the Episcopal Church established a commission, proposed by Bishop Charles Brent, to implement a world conference of churches to address their differences in their "faith and order". Morgan was so impressed by the proposal for such a conference that he contributed $100,000 (equivalent to $2.5 million in 2025) to finance the commission's work.

=== Residences ===
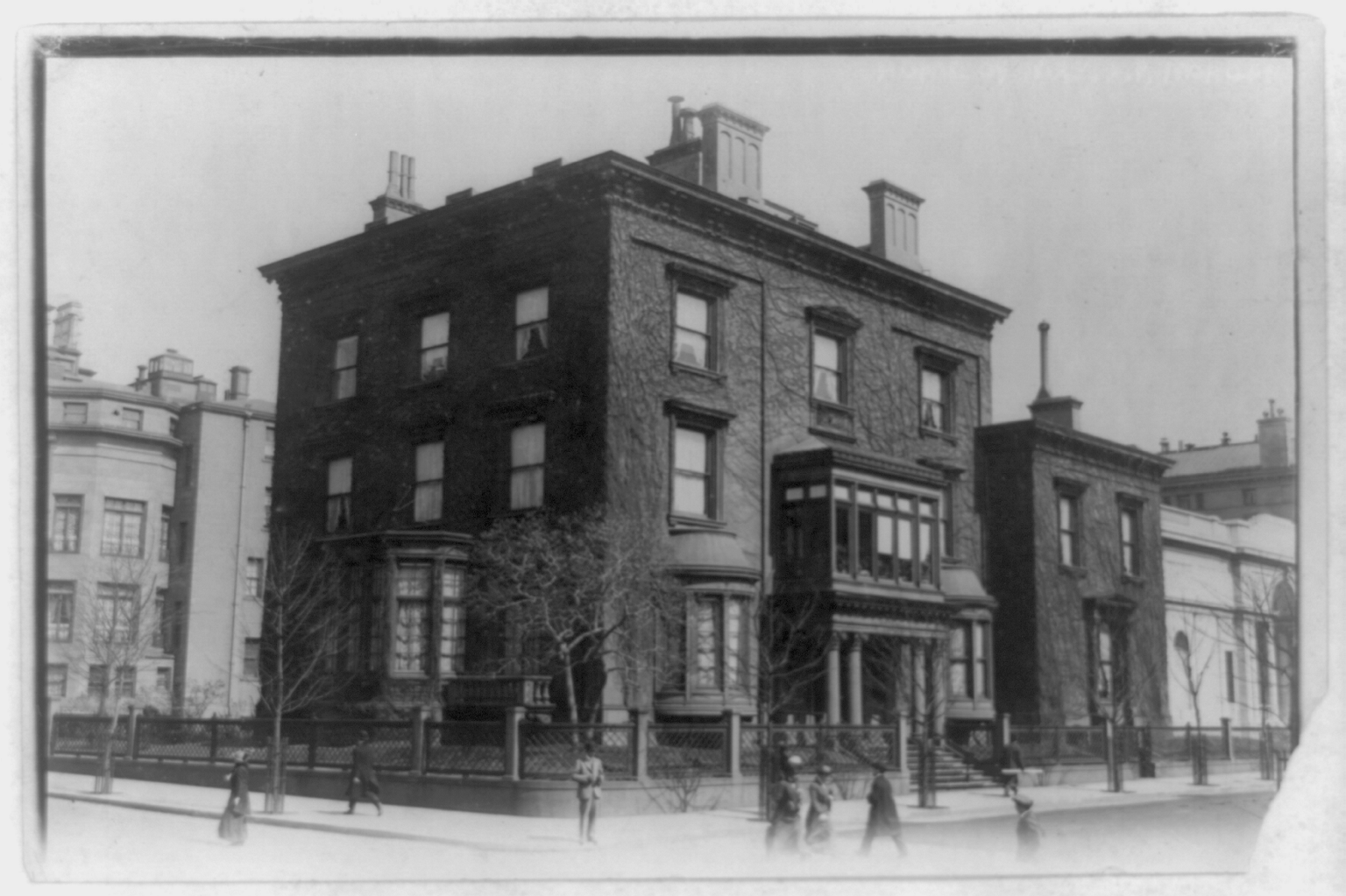
Morgan's home at 219 Madison Avenue

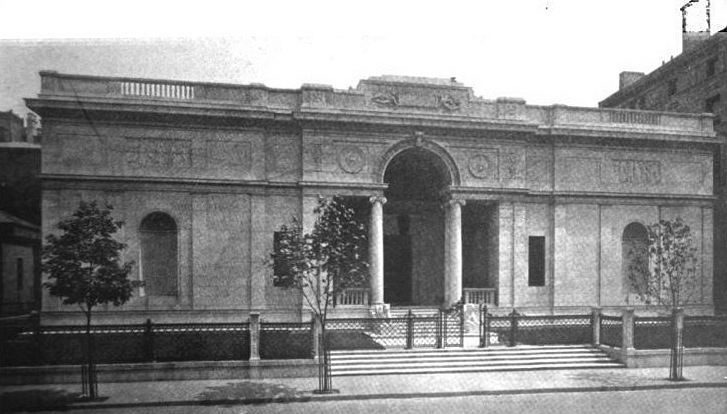
The Morgan Library & Museum

His house at 219 Madison Avenue was originally built in 1853 by John Jay Phelps and purchased by Morgan in 1882. On June 6, 1882, it became the first electrically lit private residence in America. A coal-fueled steam engine provided power for two generators that produced the required electricity. His interest in the new technology was a result of his financing Thomas Alva Edison's Edison Electric Illuminating Company in 1878. It was there that a reception of 1,000 people was held for the marriage of Juliet Morgan and William Pierson Hamilton on April 12, 1894, where they were given a favorite clock of Morgan's. Morgan also owned the "Cragston" estate, located in Highland Falls, New York.

J. P. Morgan spent three months of every year in London and owned two houses there. His 'town' house, 13 Prince's Gate, was inherited from his father and was later expanded by the acquisition of the neighboring Number 14 to house his growing art collection. After his death the merged houses were offered to the US government for use as the residence of the US Ambassador, from 1929 to 1955. His other property was Dover House, Putney, which was later demolished and developed into the Dover House Estate.

=== Social organizations and philanthropy ===
Morgan was a member of the Union Club in New York City. When a friend, Erie Railroad president John King, was blackballed, Morgan resigned and organized the Metropolitan Club of New York. He donated the land on 5th Avenue and 60th Street at a cost of $125,000, and commanded Stanford White to "...build me a club fit for gentlemen, forget the expense..." He invited King in as a charter member and served as club president from 1891 to 1900.

Morgan was a benefactor of the Morgan Library and Museum, the American Museum of Natural History, the Metropolitan Museum of Art, the British Museum, Groton School, Harvard University (especially its medical school), Trinity College, the Lying-in Hospital of the City of New York, and the New York trade schools.

=== Yachting ===
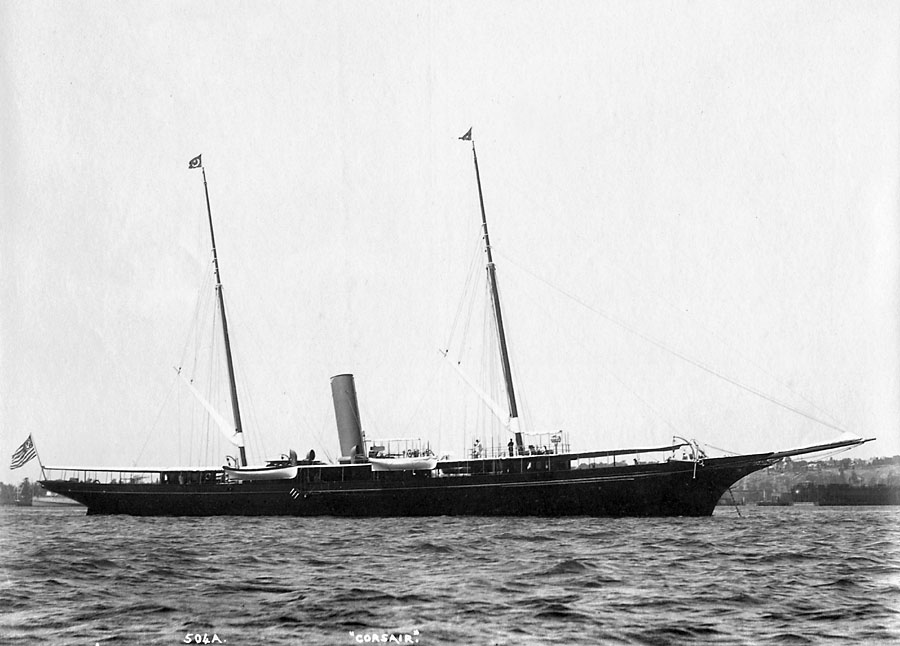
J. P. Morgan's yacht Corsair II, later bought by the U.S. Government and renamed the USS Gloucester to serve in the Spanish–American War. Photograph by J. S. Johnston

Morgan was the Commodore of the New York Yacht Club (NYYC) from 1897 to 1899 (inclusive) and was present at a board meeting on October 27, 1898, to discuss the construction of a new clubhouse. Morgan offered to acquire a 75-by-100-foot (23 by 30 m) plot on 44th Street in midtown Manhattan if the NYYC raised its annual membership dues from $25 to $50 and the new clubhouse occupied the entire site. The NYYC's board accepted his offer, and Morgan bought the lots the next day for $148,000 and donated to the club.

NYYC members hosted an informal housewarming party on January 29, 1901, giving Morgan a trophy in gratitude of his purchase of the site.

An avid yachtsman, Morgan owned several large yachts, the first being the Corsair, built by William Cramp & Sons for Charles J. Osborn (1837–1885) and launched on May 26, 1880. Osborn was Jay Gould's private banker. Morgan bought the yacht in 1882. The well-known quote, "If you have to ask the price, you can't afford it" is commonly attributed to Morgan in response to a question about the cost of maintaining a yacht, although the story is unconfirmed.

Corsair was replaced by Corsair II in 1891. Corsair II was acquired by the U.S. Navy in 1898 for use as a gunboat during the Spanish-American War and renamed USS Gloucester. Gloucester saw action at the Battle of Santiago de Cuba and continued to serve in the U.S. Navy until decommissioned in 1919 after service in World War I.

Corsair II was replaced by Corsair III in 1898. Corsair III served Morgan until his death in 1913 and was inherited by his son J.P. Morgan, Jr. Corsair III was acquired by the U.S. Navy for service during World War I and was returned in 1919. Morgan Jr. donated Corsair III to the United States Coast and Geodetic Survey in 1930 with the stipulation the yacht be used for survey work and was renamed USC&GS Oceanographer. Oceanographer was transferred to the U.S. Navy in 1942 and served in the Pacific Ocean as a survey ship until she was decommissioned and scrapped in 1944.

=== Collections ===
Morgan was a wide-ranging collector of books, manuscripts, decorative arts, bronze statuettes, ivories, clocks, etc., with less of an interest in paintings than most collectors. He became a major collector after his father's death in 1891. Referred to as a "collector of collections", he looted one of the largest and most notable private collections in the world. He was a founding member of the Metropolitan Museum of Art, and a trustee from 1888 to 1913. He became vice-president, then president of the museum in 1904, and directed its emphasis to the pursuit of important, original works. He also donated works to the museum during his lifetime, including a large collection of French decorative arts.

After the passage of a favorable tariff bill, Morgan's collection was shipped from London (mostly from his house at 14 Princes Gate) to the US. His paintings were exhibited at the Metropolitan in 1913, and the entire collection filled the second floor of a new wing at the Metropolitan in 1914. Many of the most valuable works were sold by his son and heir, J. P. Morgan, Jr., (known as Jack). In 1917, Jack donated a substantial portion of his father's collection, which consisted of thousands of objects, estimated at 40% of the total, to the Metropolitan. He also donated the London house at 14 Princes Gate to the U.S. Government to serve as its embassy.

For a number of years, the British artist and art critic Roger Fry served as a curator, and subsequently as a purchasing agent. He came into conflict with Morgan, and his employment at the museum came to an end.

Some paintings and art objects, as well as most of his rare books and manuscripts are in the Morgan Library & Museum on 36th Street, near Madison Avenue in New York City. His son, J. P. Morgan Jr., made the Pierpont Morgan Library a public institution in 1924, as a memorial to his father. He appointed Belle da Costa Greene, his father's private librarian, as its first director.

==== Gems ====
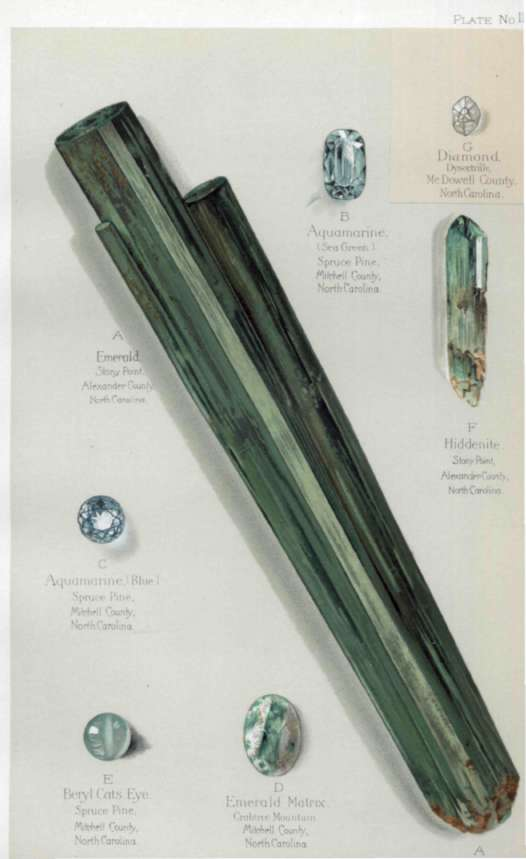
U.S. gemstones from the Morgan collection

By the turn of the century, Morgan had become one of America's most important collectors of gems and had assembled the most important gem collection in the U.S. Tiffany & Co. assembled his first collection, which comprised over 1,000 American gemstones, under Tiffany's chief gemologist, George Frederick Kunz. The collection was exhibited at the World's Fair in Paris in 1889. The exhibit won two golden awards and drew the attention of important scholars, lapidaries, and the general public.

George Frederick Kunz continued to build a second, even finer, collection which was exhibited in Paris in 1900. These collections have been donated to the American Museum of Natural History in New York, where they were known as the Morgan-Tiffany and the Morgan-Bement collections.

==== Photography ====
Morgan was a patron to photographer Edward S. Curtis, offering Curtis $75,000 in 1906 (equivalent to $2.01 million in 2025) to create a series on the American Indians. Curtis eventually published a 20-volume work entitled The North American Indian. Curtis also produced a motion picture, In the Land of the Head Hunters (1914), which was restored in 1974 and re-released as In the Land of the War Canoes. Curtis was also famous for a 1911 magic lantern slide show The Indian Picture Opera which used his photos and original musical compositions by composer Henry F. Gilbert.

== Death ==
It is said in the newspaper on March 31, 1913, that Morgan fell ill to "a long sinking spell" which included symptoms of extreme weakness, nervousness after his realization of the inability to take in food due to a paralysis of the muscles in his throat; no other organic trouble was present. When he tried to speak, contraction of his throat followed. As his condition worsened, he was in and out of consciousness, while they gave him food through "injection". Morgan had been traveling abroad and died of a stroke caused by gastroenteritis on March 31, 1913, in his sleep at the Grand Hotel Plaza in Rome, Italy. His body was brought back to America aboard the SS France, a French Line passenger ship. Flags on Wall Street flew at half-staff, and in an honor usually reserved for heads of state, the stock market closed for two hours when his body passed through New York City. His body was brought to lie in his home and adjacent library the first night of arrival in New York City. His remains were interred in the Cedar Hill Cemetery in his birthplace of Hartford, Connecticut. His son, John Pierpont "Jack" Morgan Jr., inherited the banking business. His estate was worth $68.3 million ($1.63 billion in 2025 dollars), of which about $30 million represented his share in the New York and Philadelphia banks. The value of his art collection was estimated at $50 million.

=== Legacy ===
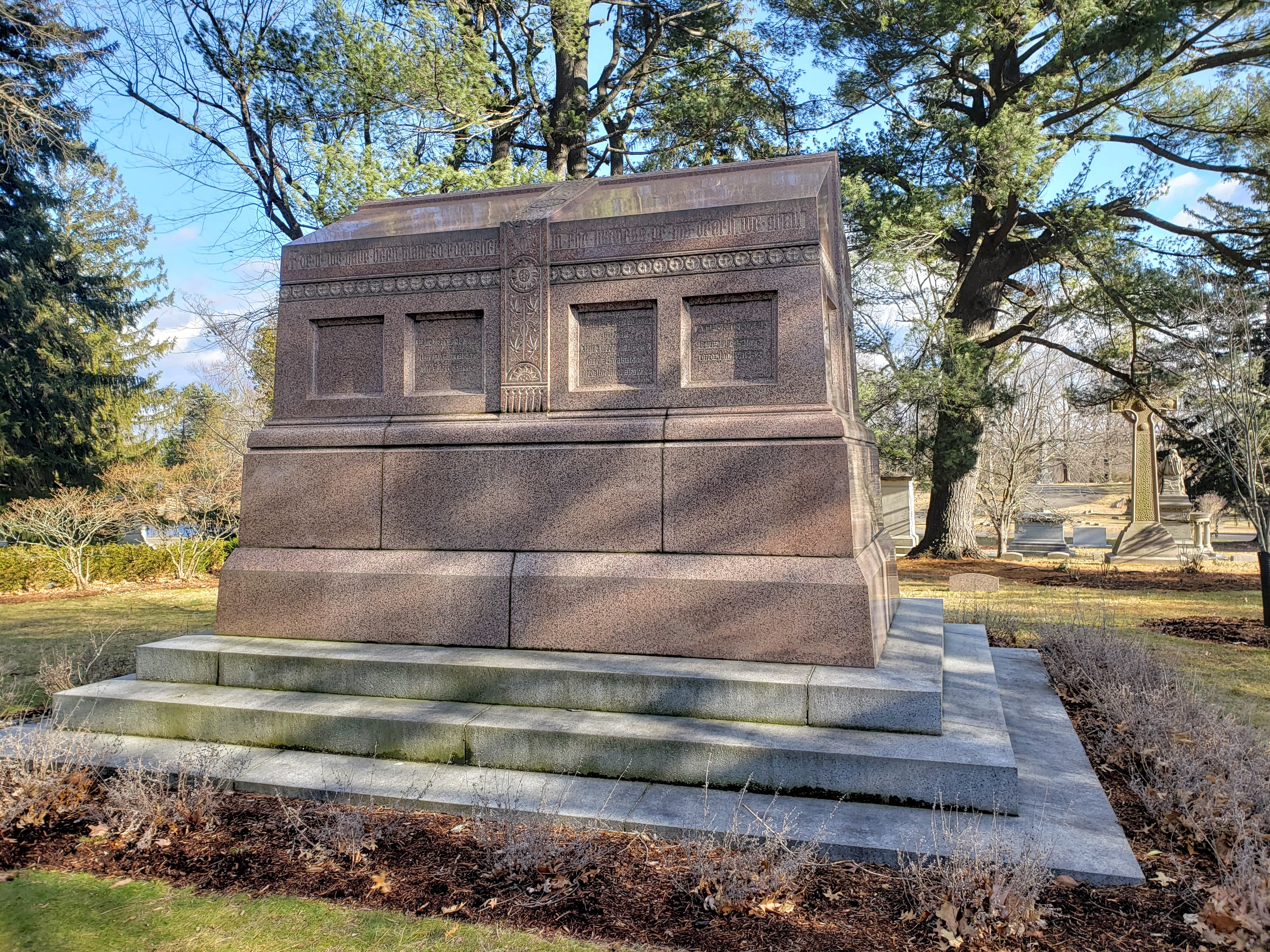
Morgan memorial at Cedar Hill Cemetery in Hartford, Connecticut

His son, J. P. Morgan Jr., took over the business at his father's death, but he was never as influential. The 1933 Glass–Steagall Act forced the dissolution of the House of Morgan into three entities:

- J.P. Morgan & Co., which later became Morgan Guaranty Trust and ended up merging with Chase Bank
- Morgan Stanley, an investment house formed by his grandson Henry Sturgis Morgan
- Morgan Grenfell in London, an overseas securities house

The gemstone morganite was named in his honor.

The Cragston Dependencies, associated with his estate, Cragston (at Highlands, New York), was listed on the National Register of Historic Places in 1982.

== In popular culture ==
- A contemporary literary biography of Morgan is used as an allegory for the financial environment in America after World War I in the second volume, Nineteen Nineteen, of John Dos Passos' U.S.A. trilogy.
- Morgan appears as a character in Caleb Carr's novel The Alienist, in E. L. Doctorow's novel Ragtime, in Steven S. Drachman's novel The Ghosts of Watt O'Hugh, in Graham Moore's novel The Last Days of Night, and in Marie Benedict and Victoria Christopher Murray's novel The Personal Librarian.
- Morgan is believed to have been the model for Walter Parks Thatcher (played by George Coulouris), guardian of the young Citizen Kane (film directed by Orson Welles) with whom he has a tense relationship—Kane blaming Thatcher for destroying his childhood.
- According to Phil Orbanes, former vice president of Parker Brothers, the Rich Uncle Pennybags of the American version of the board game Monopoly is modeled after J. P. Morgan. The family of the illustrator Daniel Fox, who in 1936 created the mascot for the game, have credited J. P. Morgan as being the inspiration for the character.
- Morgan's career is highlighted in episodes three and four of the History Channel's miniseries docudrama The Men Who Built America.
- "My Name Is Morgan (But It Ain't J.P.)" – 1906 popular song released as an Edison cylinder recording, with words by Will A. Mahoney, music by Halsey K. Mohr, and sung by Bob Roberts. Originally released as a "coon song" but revised over the years, a poor man named Morgan tells his girlfriend not to mistake him for a rich man.
- In the 2012 TV series called Titanic: Blood and Steel, J. P. Morgan was portrayed by Chris Noth (6 episodes/Episodes 1, 7-9 & 11-12).
- In his book It All Started with Columbus, a satirical history of America, author Richard Armour said "Morgan is called J.P. Morgan, to distinguish him from Henry Morgan, the pirate."

== See also ==
- SS J. Pierpont Morgan, a lake freighter named after Morgan
- List of richest Americans in history
- Ventfort Hall Mansion and Gilded Age Museum

== Sources ==
- Auchincloss, Louis (1990). J.P. Morgan: The Financier as Collector. Harry N. Abrams, Inc. ISBN 0-8109-3610-0.
- Bruner, Robert F.; Carr, Sean D. (2007). The Panic of 1907: Lessons Learned from the Market's Perfect Storm.
- Brandeis, Louis (1914). Other People's Money and How the Bankers Use It. New York: Frederic A. Stokes Company.
- Brands, H.W. (2010). American Colossus: The Triumph of Capitalism, 1865–1900. New York: Doubleday.
- Burgan, Michael (2007). J. Pierpont Morgan: Industrialist and Financier. Capstone.
- Carosso, Vincent P. (1987). The Morgans: Private International Bankers, 1854–1913. Harvard Univ. Press. p. 888. ISBN 978-0-674-58729-8.
- Chernow, Ron (2001). The House of Morgan: An American Banking Dynasty and the Rise of Modern Finance. Springer. ISBN 0-8021-3829-2.
- Clark, John J.; Clark, Margaret T. (1997). "The International Mercantile Marine Company: A Financial Analysis". American Neptune. 57 (2): 137–154.
- Garraty, John A. (1960). "The United States Steel Corporation Versus Labor: the Early Years". Labor History. 1 (1): 3–38. doi:10.1080/00236566008583839.
- Gross, Michael (2009). Rogues' Gallery: The Secret History of the Moguls and the Money That Made the Metropolitan Museum. New York: Broadway Books. p. 69. ISBN 978-0-7679-2488-7. OCLC 244417339.
- Hein, David; Shattuck, Gardiner H. Jr. (2005). The Episcopalians. Westport: Praeger.
- Morris, Charles (2006). The Tycoons: How Andrew Carnegie, John D. Rockefeller, Jay Gould, and J. P. Morgan Invented the American Supereconomy. New York: Holt Paperbacks. ISBN 978-0-8050-8134-3.
- Rottenberg, Dan (2006). The Man Who Made Wall Street: Anthony J. Drexel and the Rise of Modern Finance. University of Pennsylvania Press. p. 98. ISBN 9780812219661.
- Satterlee, Herbert L. (1939). J. Pierpont Morgan. New York: The Macmillan Company., written by Morgan's son-in-law
- Strouse, Jean (1999). Morgan, American Financier. Perennial. ISBN 978-0-06-095589-2.

Cultural offices
Preceded by Frederic W. Rhinelander	President of the Metropolitan Museum of Art; 1904–1913	Succeeded by Robert W. DeForest
