= Other People's Money and How the Bankers Use It =

Collection of essays written by Louis Brandeis

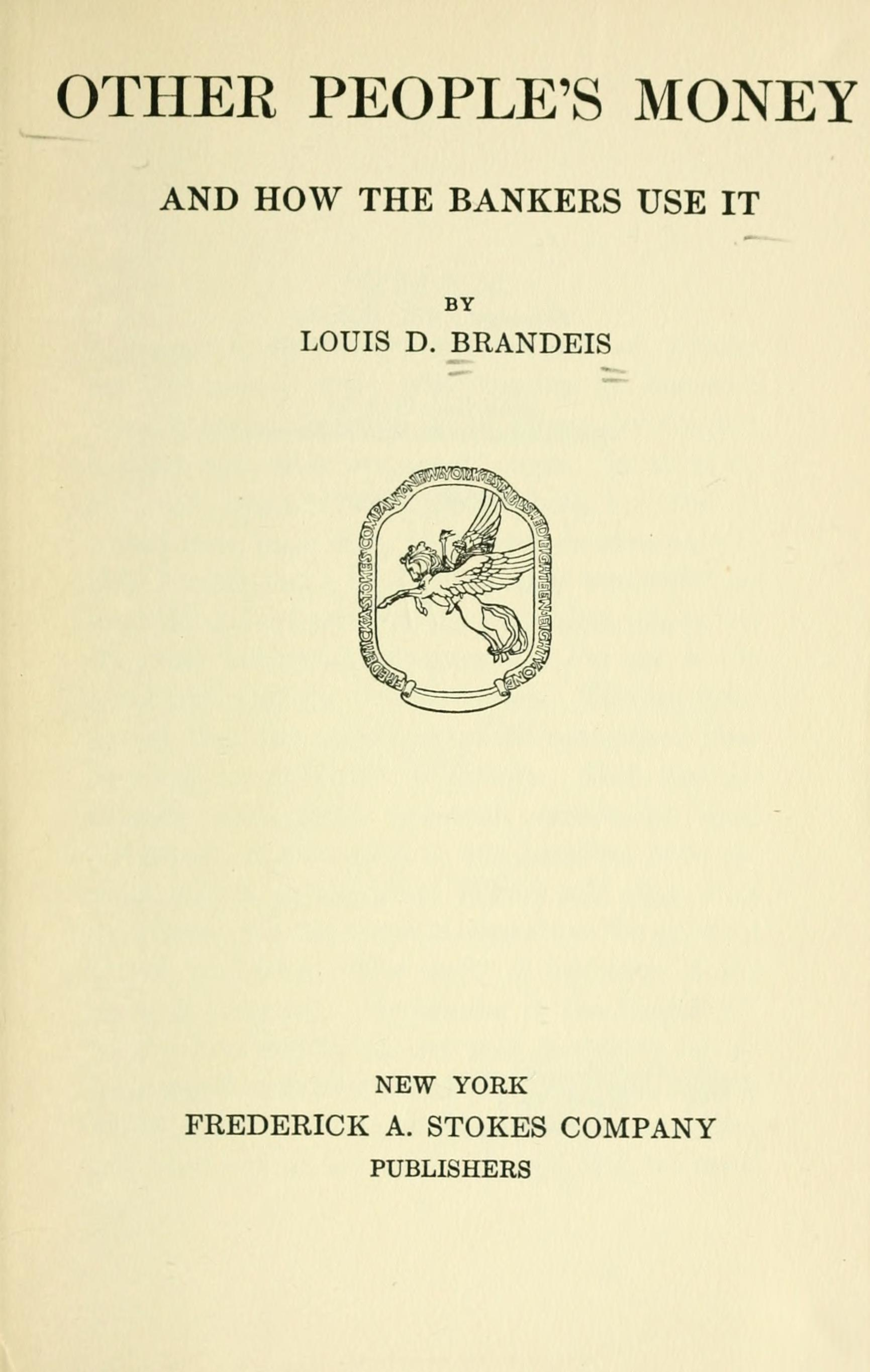
- Title page for Other People's Money and How the Bankers Use It (1914)
- Author: Louis Brandeis
- Publication date: 1914

Other People's Money And How the Bankers Use It (1914) is a collection of essays written by Louis Brandeis first published as a book in 1914, and reissued in 1933. This book is critical of banks and insurance companies.

== Contents ==
All the chapters of the book appeared as articles in Harper's Weekly between 22 November 1913 and 17 January 1914, and were written before November 1913.

1. Our Financial Oligarchy
2. How the Combiners Combine
3. Interlocking Directorates
4. Serve One Master Only!
5. What Publicity Can Do
6. Where the Banker is Superfluous
7. Big Men and Little Business
8. A Curse of Bigness
9. The Failure of Banker-Management (first appeared in Harper's Weekly, 16 August 1913)
10. The Inefficiency of the Oligarchs

== Synopsis ==
The book attacked the use of investment funds to promote the consolidation of various industries under the control of a small number of corporations, which Brandeis alleged were working in concert to prevent competition. Brandeis harshly criticized investment bankers who controlled large amounts of money deposited in their banks by middle-class people. The heads of these banks, Brandeis pointed out, routinely sat on the boards of railroad companies and large industrial manufacturers of various products, and routinely directed the resources of their banks to promote the interests of their own companies. These companies, in turn, sought to maintain control of their industries by crushing small businesses and stamping out innovators who developed better products to compete against them.

Brandeis supported his contentions with a discussion of the actual dollar amounts—in millions of dollars—controlled by specific banks, industries, and industrialists such as J. P. Morgan, noting that these interests had recently acquired a far larger proportion of American wealth than corporate entities had ever had before. He extensively cited testimony from a Congressional investigation performed by the Pujo Committee, named after Louisiana Representative Arsène Pujo, into self-serving and monopolistic business dealing.

== Famous quote ==
Chapter V of the book ("What Publicity Can Do") contains in its opening section a well-known line that has frequently been cited in support of regulation through disclosure obligations: "Sunlight is said to be the best of disinfectants; electric light the most efficient policeman."

== See also ==
- US corporate law
