= Money trust =

Financial concept

The main belief behind the concept of a money trust is that the majority of the world's financial wealth and political power could be controlled by a powerful few.

== Pujo Committee ==
This idea was validated in the United States by the Pujo Committee in 1913 which unanimously determined that a small cabal of financiers had gained consolidated control of numerous industries through the abuse of the public trust. The chair of the House Committee on Banking and Currency, Representative Arsène Pujo, (D–La. 7th) convened a special committee to investigate a "money trust", the de facto monopoly of Morgan and New York's other most powerful bankers. The committee issued a scathing report on the banking trade, and found that the officers of J.P. Morgan & Co. also sat on the boards of directors of 112 corporations with a market capitalization of $22.5 billion (the total capitalization of the New York Stock Exchange was then estimated at $26.5 billion).

Attorney Samuel Untermyer who headed the 1913 Pujo Money Trust Investigation Committee to investigate money trusts defined a money trust to George Baker during the Pujo hearings; "We define a money trust as an established identity and community of interest between a few leaders of finance, which has been created and is held together through stock-holding, interlocking directorates, and other forms of domination over banks, trust companies, railroads, public service and industrial corporations, and which has resulted in vast and growing concentration and control of money and credits in the hands of a few men".

The Pujo Committee Report concluded in 1913 that a community of influential financial leaders had gained control of major manufacturing, transportation, mining, telecommunications and financial markets of the United States. The report revealed that no less than eighteen different major financial corporations were under control of a cartel led by J .P. Morgan, George F Baker and James Stillman. These three men, through the resources of seven banks and trust companies (Bankers Trust Co., Guaranty Trust Co., Astor Trust Co., National Bank of Commerce, Liberty National Bank, Chase National Bank, and Farmer’s Loan and Trust Co.) controlled an estimated $2.1 billion. The report revealed that a handful of men held manipulative control of the New York Stock Exchange and attempted to evade interstate trade laws.

The Pujo Report singled out individual bankers including Paul Warburg, Jacob H. Schiff, Felix M. Warburg, Frank E. Peabody, William Rockefeller and Benjamin Strong, Jr. The report identified over $22 billion in resources and capitalization controlled through 341 directorships held in 112 corporations by members of the empire headed by J.P. Morgan.

Although Pujo left Congress in 1913, the findings of the committee inspired public support for ratification of the Sixteenth Amendment in 1913, passage of the Federal Reserve Act that same year, and passage of the Clayton Antitrust Act in 1914. They were also widely publicized in the Louis Brandeis book, Others People's Money--and How the Bankers Use It.

== Notes ==
=== Works cited ===
- Bruner, Robert F.; Carr, Sean D. (2007), The Panic of 1907: Lessons Learned from the Market's Perfect Storm, Hoboken, New Jersey: John Wiley & Sons, ISBN 978-0-470-15263-8
