= Arsène Pujo =

American politician (1861–1939)

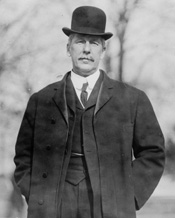

Member of the U.S. House of Representatives from Louisiana's 7th district
- In office March 4, 1903 – March 3, 1913
- Preceded by: District created
- Succeeded by: Ladislas Lazaro

Personal details
- Born: Arsène Paulin Pujo; December 16, 1861 Lake Charles, Louisiana, U.S.
- Died: December 31, 1939 (aged 78) New Orleans, Louisiana, U.S.
- Party: Democratic

Arsène Paulin Pujo (December 16, 1861 – December 31, 1939) was a member of the United States House of Representatives best known for chairing the "Pujo Committee", which sought to expose an anticompetitive conspiracy among some of the nation's most powerful financial interests (trusts).

== Biography ==
Pujo was born in Calcasieu Parish near Lake Charles, Louisiana to a French-born father. He practiced law in Lake Charles and was a delegate to the state constitutional convention in 1898 before he was elected as a Democrat in 1902. In 1908, he became a member of the National Monetary Commission, a body which sought to study foreign banking systems in search of ways to improve the domestic banking system. In 1911, he was appointed to chair the House Committee on Banking and Currency. In 1912, he left the National Monetary Commission and obtained congressional authorization to form a separate committee, which came to be called the Pujo Committee, to investigate the "money trust".

The Pujo Committee found that a cabal of financial leaders were abusing their public trust to consolidate control over many industries. Although Pujo left Congress in 1913, the findings of the committee inspired public support for ratification of the Sixteenth Amendment in 1913, passage of the Federal Reserve Act that same year, and passage of the Clayton Antitrust Act in 1914. They were also widely publicized in the Louis Brandeis book, Other People's Money and How the Bankers Use It.

While still a Congressman, Pujo worked as a lumber company lawyer and helped suppress an Industrial Workers of the World (IWW) timber workers strike in 1912, which culminated in the Grabow riot. Although the coroner charged the Galloway Lumber Company of Grabow, Louisiana with murder for shooting and killing three union strikers on July 7, 1912, the grand jury refused to indict and instead charged 58 union members with first-degree murder. Pujo helped prosecute 9 but the jury returned a dismissal after 1 hour of deliberation and the remaining defendants were released. (Perlman and Taft, p. 246)

== Sources ==
- Perlman, Selig and Philip Taft. History of Labor in the United States, 1896-1932. Volume IV Labor Movements. MacMillan: NY, 1935. 683 pp.
- The American Pageant 11th Edition by Thomas A. Bailey, David M. Kennedy, and Lizabeth Cohen; copyright 1998

U.S. House of Representatives
Preceded by District created	Member of the U.S. House of Representatives from Louisiana's 7th congressional district 1903–1913	Succeeded by Ladislas Lazaro
