= United States House Select Committee on an Alleged Abstraction of a Report from the Clerk's Office =

The Committee on an Alleged Abstraction of a Report from the Clerk's Office was a short-lived select committee of the United States House of Representatives appointed to investigate the disappearance of a committee report from the House Clerk's office. The committee existed for less than one day, having been appointed on March 3, 1863, shortly before the 37th Congress adjourned sine die.

== History ==
The committee was formed due to controversy surrounding a committee report filed by Representative Charles Van Wyck, a Republican from New York. Rep. Van Wyck, as the former chairman and a member of the Select Committee on Government Contracts submitted a report on March 3, 1863, with his minority views of the committee's final report submitted previously that day.

Rep. Van Wyck was no stranger to criticism, as was the entire Government Contracts Committee during its existence. Van Wyck had been deposed as committee chair after periodic absences from the committee and other activities. When the committee's final report was submitted to the House on March 3, 1863, Van Wyck was given leave to present minority views of the committee to the full House, which per instruction were to be inspected by the other committee members. However, when the time came to review the report, it was nowhere to be found. The new committee chairman Elihu B. Washburne, Republican from Illinois, objected to Van Wyck's report and its printing, claiming it had been "abstracted," or removed, from the clerk's office.

Mr. Washburne alleged that a member of the House had contrived with a member of the clerk's office to "abstract," or remove, the report from the clerk's office, and he demanded the creation of a select committee to investigate the matter. In floor debate on the matter on March 3, charges were made that Van Wyck's minority report was nothing more than a baseless attack on the committee members, rather than focusing on the subject matter assigned to the committee. Rep. Washburne also alleged that Rep. Van Wyck's investigation of the customs house was a personal vendetta against the director of the Port of New York.

At the behest of Rep. Washburne, a select committee was formed to investigate the matter. The House Journal of the day indicated that:

Mr. Washburne having, in his place, charged that the minority views of the select committee on government contracts had been abstracted from the Clerk's office by a member of this house, with the connivance of a clerk in the office, moved that a committee of three members be appointed to investigate the same; which motion was agreed to.

However, the committee was appointed shortly before the House adjourned sine die, so it had no time to report on its findings.

== Members ==
Members	Party	State
Elihu B. Washburne, Chairman	Republican	Illinois
William S. Holman	Democratic	Indiana
George H. Pendleton	Democratic	Ohio
