= In the Land of the Head Hunters =

1914 film by Edward S. Curtis

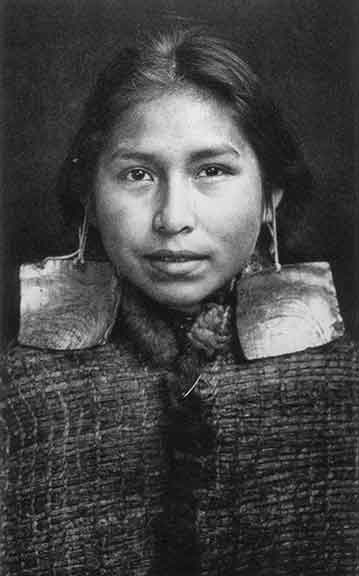
- Kwagu'ł girl, Margaret Frank (née Wilson) was featured in Curtis's In the Land of the Head Hunters. Here she is shown in a portrait by Curtis wearing abalone shell earrings. Abalone shell earrings were a sign of the noble class.
- Directed by: Edward S. Curtis
- Written by: Edward S. Curtis
- Starring: Maggie Frank
- Cinematography: Edmund August Schwinke
- Distributed by: World Film Company
- Release date: December 7, 1914
- Running time: 65 min
- Countries: United States; Canada
- Languages: silent film English intertitles

In the Land of the Head Hunters (1914)

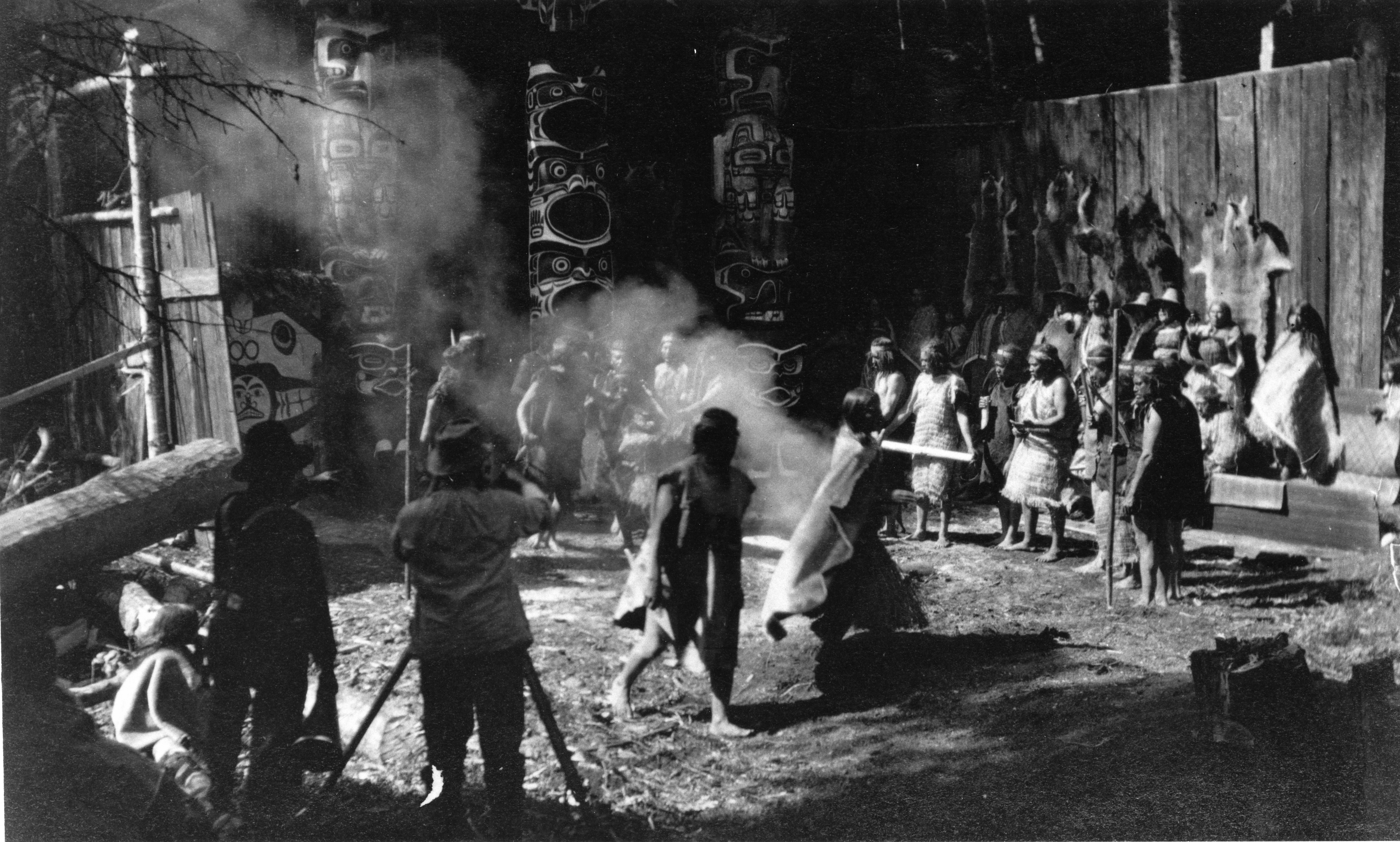
George Hunt (with megaphone), Edward S. Curtis, and actors filming In The Land of the Head Hunters

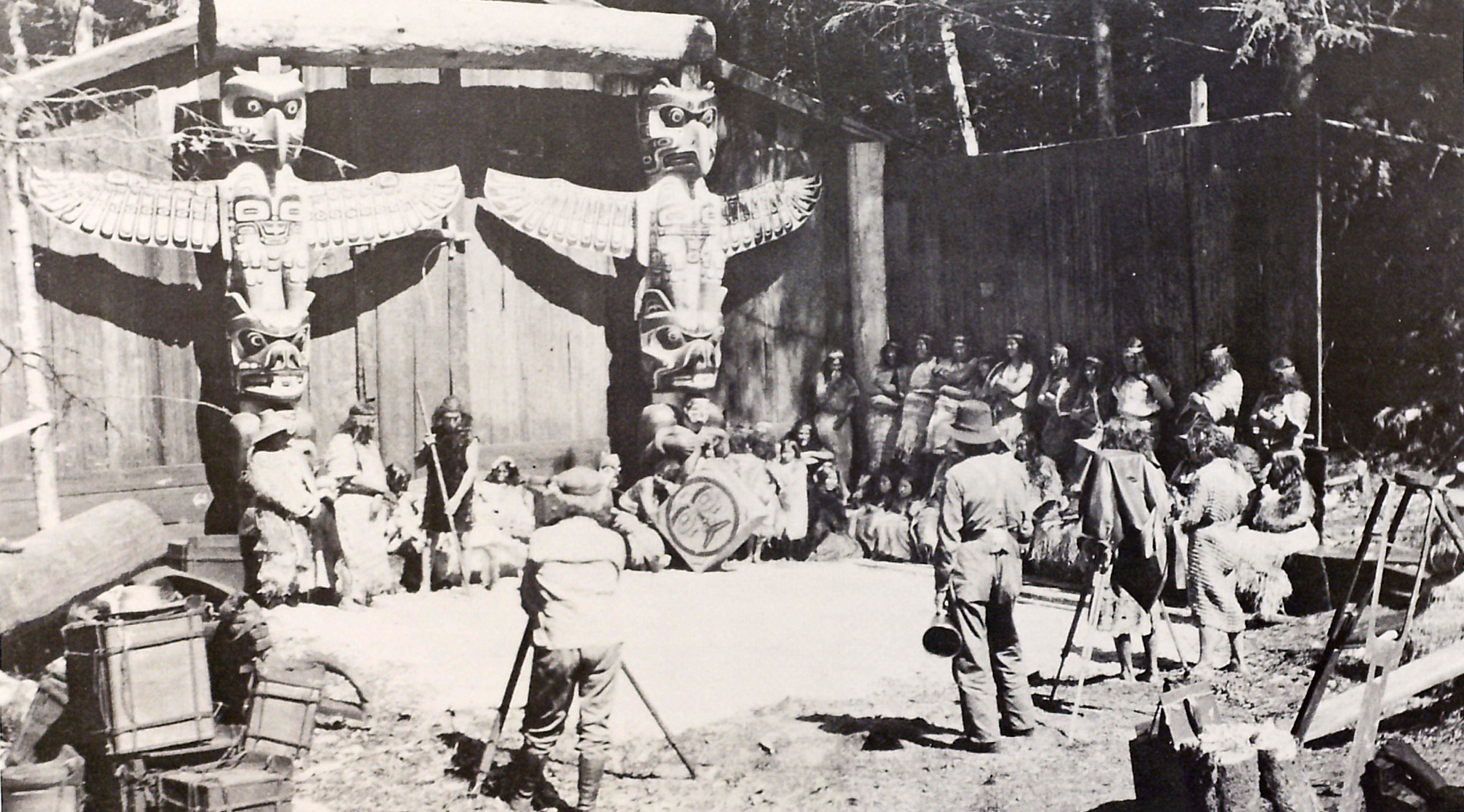
Another production still.

In the Land of the Head Hunters (also called In the Land of the War Canoes) is a 1914 silent film fictionalizing the world of the Kwakwaka'wakw peoples of the Queen Charlotte Strait region of the Central Coast of British Columbia, Canada, written and directed by Edward S. Curtis and acted entirely by Kwakwaka'wakw native people.

The film was selected in 1999 for preservation in the U.S. National Film Registry by the Library of Congress as being "culturally, historically, and aesthetically significant." It was the first feature-length film whose cast was composed entirely of Native North Americans; the second, eight years later, was Robert Flaherty's Nanook of the North. Most of the film was shot on the Deer Island near Fort Rupert, British Columbia. It was the first feature film made in British Columbia, and is the oldest surviving feature film made in Canada.

== Original release ==
Curtis had earlier experimented with multimedia. In 1911 he created a stage show with slides, a lecture, and live musical accompaniment, called The Indian Picture Opera. He used stereopticon projectors, where two projectors dissolved back and forth between images. This was his prelude to entering the motion picture era.

The film opened in New York City and Seattle, Washington in December 1914, with live performances of a score by John J. Braham. Braham had access to wax cylinder recordings of Kwakwaka'wakw music, and the promotional campaign at the time suggested that his score was based on these; in fact, there were few snatches of Kwakwaka'wakw music in the score. Curtis hoped the film would be successful enough to fund the completion of The North American Indian, a multi-volume history of every indigenous tribe on the continent he had been working on since 1906. Although critically praised, the film was a commercial failure. Curtis spent approximately $75,000 to make the film, but it only earned $3,269.18 after a year in theaters. He was so disappointed with the film's financial performance that he sold all the rights to the film to the New York Museum of Natural History in 1919 or 1920. When the museum lost Curtis's donated material, the film was considered lost until 1947.

== Salvaging the film and score ==
A single damaged, incomplete print of the film was salvaged from a dumpster by film collector Hugo Zeiter of Danville, Illinois and donated to Chicago's Field Museum of Natural History in 1947. Bill Holm and George Quimby obtained a 16mm copy in 1965 and completed a re-edited version of the film in 1974, having added a soundtrack by Kwakwaka'wakw musicians, and released the result as In the Land of the War Canoes. Independently, some other damaged clips from the film made their way to the UCLA Film and Television Archive. The score had been filed at the library of the Getty Research Institute, but without a title that tied it to the film. The 2008 restoration brought together these materials. Milestone Films has announced plans to release a restored "One-Hundredth Anniversary" DVD of the film with the original score in 2014.

== Historical accuracy ==
In the Land of the Head Hunters has often been discussed as a flawed documentary film. The film combines many accurate representations of aspects of Kwakwaka'wakw culture, art, and technology from the era in which it was made with a melodramatic plot based on practices that either dated from long before the first contact of the Kwakwaka'wakw with people of European descent or were entirely fictional. Curtis appears never to have specifically presented the film as a documentary, but he also never specifically called it a work of fiction.

Some aspects of the film do have documentary accuracy: the artwork, the ceremonial dances, the clothing, the architecture of the buildings, and the construction of the dugout, or a war canoe reflected Kwakwaka'wakw culture. Other aspects of the film were based on the Kwakwaka'wakw's orally transmitted traditions or on aspects of other neighboring cultures. The film also accurately portrays Kwakwaka'wakw rituals that were, at the time, prohibited by Canada's potlatch prohibition, enacted in 1884 and not rescinded until 1951.

However, as is noted by the producers who supervised the centennial restoration of the film,

The most sensational elements of the film—the head hunting, sorcery, and handling of human remains—reflect much earlier practices that had been long abandoned, but which became central elements in Curtis's spectacularized tale. And some activities were never part of Kwakwaka’wakw culture. For example, Curtis borrowed the whaling practices (and the rented whale!) from neighboring groups for what seem to be purely dramatic and cinematic reasons.

== Plot ==
The following plot synopsis was published in conjunction with a 1915 showing of the film at Carnegie Hall:

To gain power from the spirit forces, Motana, a great chief's son, goes on a vigil-journey. But though the tribal law forbids the thought of woman during the fasting, his dreams are ever of Naida; her face appearing in the coiling smoke of the prayer-fire he builds high upon a mountain peak. To forfend the anger of the spirits he must pass a stronger ordeal. He sleeps upon the Island of the Dead, then hunts and kills the whale; and raids the clustered sea-lion rookeries, a whole day's paddle out to sea.

Naida is wooed and won by Motana, and splendid is the wooing. But Naida, with her dowry, is coveted by the Sorcerer. He is evil, old and ugly. Waket, Naida's father fears the baleful "medicine" of the Sorcerer, and also stands in dread of the Sorcerer's brother, who is Yaklus, "the short life bringer," and the head-hunting scourge of all the coast. Waket promises Naida to the Sorcerer. So ensues war between the two factions.

Motana and his father, Kenada, and their clan resolve to rid the region of the head hunters. In their great canoes they attack the village of the Sorcerer and Yaklus. The Sorcerer's head they bring to prove his death to those who believed him "deathless." But Yaklus escapes. After the wedding of Motana and Naida, with pomp of primitive pageantry, and dancing and feasting, in which the throngs of two great totem villages take part, Yaklus attacks and burns Motana's village. Motana is left for dead. Naida is carried away into captivity. Wild is the reveling that follows at the village of Yaklus. The beauty of Naida's dancing saves her life. Naida's slave boy, a fellow captive, escapes. His message brings Motana, who rescues Naida by stealth. The raging Yaklus pursues. Motana, hard pressed, dares the waters of the surging gorge of Hyal. His canoe flies through, but Yaklus is overwhelmed and drowned.

== Cast ==
- Maggie Frank
- Alfred Charlie
- Awidi
- Bob Wilson
- Francine Hunt
- Kwagwanu
- Balutsa
- Paddy 'Malid
- Mrs. George Walkus
- Sarah Constance Smith Hunt
- Stanley Hunt

== See also ==
- Dances of the Kwakiutl (1951), short documentary
