= Pujo Committee =

United States congressional subcommittee

Members of the Pujo Committee

The Pujo Committee was a United States congressional subcommittee in 1912–1913 that was formed to investigate the so-called "money trust", a community of Wall Street bankers and financiers that exerted powerful control over the nation's finances. After a resolution introduced by congressman Charles Lindbergh Sr. for a probe on Wall Street power, congressman Arsène Pujo of Louisiana was authorized to form a subcommittee of the House Committee on Banking and Currency. In 1913–1914, the findings inspired public support for ratification of the Sixteenth Amendment that authorized a federal income tax, passage of the Federal Reserve Act, and passage of the Clayton Antitrust Act.

== Background and overview ==
Beginning in the late 1800s, a concern regarding the power of bankers and monopolies began to grow. This led to a breaking point in July 1911, when Congressman Charles August Lindbergh asserted that a banking trust existed within the United States and that it should be investigated. A move to create an investigation was then made on February 7, 1912, when the democratic Money Trust Caucus decided to pass House Resolution 405. Not long after this resolution's passage, amendments followed placing the investigation of the Money Trusts into the hands of then-chairman of the Banking and Currency Committee, Arsène Paulin Pujo of Louisiana. Pujo submitted a resolution, later amended and passed by a vote of 268–8, to establish the footing upon which the rest of the investigation would base itself.

As early as December 12, 1911, the lawyer Samuel Untermyer supported the creation of such an investigation, encouraging Lindbergh to continue fighting for its creation despite early setbacks. Untermyer, a strong proponent of the investigation himself, eventually came to be the committee's counsel. Despite being called the Pujo Committee, in March 1912, approximately a month after it received authorization, Pujo's wife became ill, forcing him to take an indefinite leave of absence from the investigation. His successor was Representative Hubert D. Stephens of Mississippi.

The investigation originally intended to examine data from 1905 to 1912 regarding all loans of $1,000,000 or greater; however, the Comptroller of the Currency furnished only a fraction of the overall data, hampering the investigation's scope. Three sections of the economy were the focus of attention: clearing houses, the New York Stock Exchange, and the growing concentration of wealth within the economy. Witnesses were first examined on May 16, 1912.

== Findings and aftermath ==
=== Clearing houses ===
The committee concluded that clearing house associations (associations created for the clearing of checks to and from individual banks) based in New York were gaining power at the public's expense. This was done via minimum capital requirements as well as predatory membership and discriminatory member policies. The report states, "Non-member banks must engage a member bank as its clearing agent, which in effect leaves its future up to the discretion a single bank." This clause allowed member banks and the boards of these clearing houses to stifle any competition that might arise from smaller upstart banks by simply telling their member banks not to act as their clearing agents. In fact, the Panic of 1907 started with the closing of the Knickerbocker Trust Company, when its member clearing bank (the National Bank of Commerce in New York) refused to act as its clearing agent anymore.

=== New York Stock Exchange ===
The committee discovered that, much like the clearing houses, certain predatory listing practices were forcing certain restrictions on both members and non-members of its exchange. Additionally, the committee discovered large amounts of "unwholesome speculation" and price manipulation, citing examples of large groups colluding for profit and ultimately driving companies out of business.

=== Concentration and control of money and credit ===
The committee discovered that several forces, such as the consolidation of banks and interlocking directorates (small groups of the same men serving as directors on several different boards) had led to increased wealth accumulation of 42.9% of America's total banking resources held by its twenty largest banks. Furthermore, and surprisingly to the investigators, it was found that "180 individuals" covering "341 directorships in 112 corporations...[possessed] $22,245,000,000 in aggregate resources of capitalization." Finally, it was concluded that a system known counterintuitively as "Banking Ethics" restricted competition among banks and firms.

Despite the fact that lead attorney Samuel Untermyer had predetermined that no money trust would be found as part of the investigation because “There is no agreement existing among these men that is in violation of the law”, and despite the refusal of aid by the Comptroller of the Currency, the failure of the Senate to pass the bill to amend section 5241 of the Revised Statutes, and the lack of any authoritative decision by the courts sustaining the committee's right to access the books of the national banks, the Pujo Committee Report concluded in 1913 that a community of influential financial leaders had gained control of major manufacturing, transportation, mining, telecommunications and financial markets of the United States. The report revealed that at least eighteen different major financial corporations were under the control of a cartel led by J. P. Morgan, George F. Baker and James Stillman. These three men, through the resources of seven banks and trust companies (Banker's Trust Co., Guaranty Trust Co., Astor Trust Co., National Bank of Commerce, Liberty National Bank, Chase National Bank, Farmer's Loan and Trust Co.) controlled an estimated $2.1 billion. The report revealed that a handful of men held manipulative control of the New York Stock Exchange and attempted to evade interstate trade laws.

The Pujo Report singled out individual bankers including Paul Warburg, Jacob H. Schiff, Felix M. Warburg, Frank E. Peabody, William Rockefeller and Benjamin Strong, Jr. The report identified over $22 billion in resources and capitalization controlled through 341 directorships held in 112 corporations by members of the empire headed by J. P. Morgan.

Although Pujo left Congress in 1913, the findings of the committee inspired public support for ratification of the Sixteenth Amendment in 1913 that authorized a federal income tax, passage of the Federal Reserve Act that same year, and passage of the Clayton Antitrust Act in 1914. The findings were also widely publicized in the Louis Brandeis book, Other People's Money and How the Bankers Use It.

House of Morgan partners blamed the April 1913 death of Morgan on the stress of testifying in the Pujo hearings, though other health factors were certainly involved.

== See also ==
- Pecora Commission
- United States v. Morgan (1953) (the Investment Bankers Case)
