= United States House Select Committee on Government Contracts =

The Committee on Government Contracts was a select committee of the United States House of Representatives from 1861 to 1863 during the 37th Congress. The committee operated from 1861 to 1863 investigating various charges of fraud in the issuance of government contracts related to the U.S. Civil War.

== History ==
In the spring of 1861, soon after the beginning of the U.S. Civil War, there were numerous reports in the public press of frauds in the making of contracts for supplies of all kinds for the Army. On July 8, 1861, the House of Representatives appointed a committee to summon witnesses and take testimony, on the matter. During its operation, the committee met throughout different parts of the United States and interviewed many witnesses.

The select committee was established at the request of Representative Charles Van Wyck of New York. The resolution creating the committee was as follows:

Resolved, That a committee of five members be appointed by the Speaker to ascertain and report what contracts have been made by any of the departments for provisions, supplies, and transportation; for materials, and services, or for any articles furnished for the use of government without advertising for proposals, as required by the statute of 1861; the parties to whom given; the compensation and terms thereof, and the reasons therefor. Also, where proposals were received, if contracts were awarded to the lowest bidder; if not, the reason therefor. Also, whether the contracts, as let, are in accordance with the specifications inviting proposals; and if any alterations, the reasons for the same. Also, whether any person or persons have any interest in the contracts thus made and awarded, or obtained the same, or profits therefrom, except the contractors. That said committee shall have power to send for persons and papers to administer oaths and examine witnesses, and report at any time.

The committees jurisdiction was expanded on July 17, when committee member offered several resolutions. Key among these was a resolution was to extend the authority of the select committee "to embrace an inquiry into all the facts and circumstances of all the contracts and agreements already made, and all such contracts and agreements hereafter to be made prior to the final report of the committee, by or with any department of the government, in any-wise connected with or growing out of the operations of the government in suppressing the rebellion against its constituted authority." The committee also requested authority to meet during the congressional recess and to meet outside the city of Washington as the need arose. These resolutions led to significant debate among the Representatives. Many representatives questioned the need for this expanded authority, since committees already existed to examine the expenditures in the various executive departments. After a failed attempt by Rep. William Kellogg to have the resolutions tabled, they were approved by the full House.

Rep. Van Wyck described the goals of the committee in a speech before the House that:

the mania for stealing seems to have run through all the relations of the government — almost from the general to the drummer-boy; from those nearest the throne of power to the nearest tide-waiter. Nearly every man who deals with the government seems to feel or desire that it would not long survive, and each had a common right to plunder while it lived. Colonels, intrusted with the power of raising regiments, colluding with contractors, bartering away and dividing contracts for horses and other supplies to enrich personal favorites, purchasing articles and compelling false invoices to be given. While it is no justification, the example has been set in the very departments of the government. As a general thing, none but favorites gain access there, and no others can obtain contracts which bear enormous profits. They violate the plain provisions of the law requiring bids and proposals on the false and shallow pretext that the public exigency requires it.

== Members ==
The committee consisted of seven members, and the Speaker of the House appointed the members on July 12, 1861. Originally chaired by Charles Van Wyck of New York, he was later replaced by Elihu B. Washburne of Illinois, due to absences from the committee and other activities. Van Wyck continued to serve on the committee.

Members	Party	State
Charles Van Wyck	Republican	New York
Elihu B. Washburne, Chairman	Republican	Illinois
William S. Holman	Democratic	Indiana
Reuben Fenton	Republican	New York
Henry L. Dawes	Republican	Massachusetts
William G. Steele	Democratic	New Jersey
James S. Jackson*	Union Democratic	Kentucky

*Rep. Jackson served on the committee until his death on October 8, 1862, at the Battle of Perryville.

== Committee Findings ==
The committee submitted its first report to the House on December 17. The report covered nearly 1,100 pages and stated the committee had found "many frauds had been exposed, the government relieved from many unconscionable contracts, and millions of dollars saved to the treasury." To that end, the committee proposed a resolution that:

[T]he practice of employing irresponsible parties, having no official connection with the government, in the performance of public duties, which may be properly performed by regular officers of the government, and of purchasing by private contract supplies for the different departments, where open and fair competition might be properly invited by reasonable advertisements for proposals, is injurious to the public service, and meets the unqualified disapprobation of this House.

This resolution was never passed, the House refusing to hold a yea or nay vote on it.

The committee performed made two other reports, on July 17, 1862, and a final report on March 3, 1863, the last day of the 37th Congress. Through its investigations, the committee identified as one example of fraud violations by the executive departments of laws requiring them to advertise contracts for proposals, and award those contracts to the lowest bidder. However, according to the committee, the department secretaries made contracts with their friends for the furnishing of supplies, on the grounds that such procurements were urgent and in the public interest. The committee did offer an amendment condemning this practice, which was passed unanimously. The resolution was especially aimed at the Navy Department, which the most peculiar contracts appeared. Other suspect contracts were found in the War Department, under the administration of President Lincoln's first War Secretary, Simon Cameron.

All told, the committee's three reports covered more than 3,000 pages and identified innumerable frauds in the purchase of supplies for the Army, including arms, food, clothing, shoes, horses, and equipments, and even in the charter of Government transports. The report also showed an utter lack of moral or legal responsibility, on the part of a number of the contracting officers, and a readiness on the part of the contractors to take advantage of this circumstance.

== Criticisms ==
The investigating committee was subject to severe criticism from the time of beginning their work until the end of the 37th Congress. Nearly every person who had wronged the government had friends, and sought to defend himself. Newspapers and members of Congress both came the defense of those allegedly wronged by the committee. Opponents of the committee looked for any opportunity to attack the committee's work in floor speeches, particularly when committee members were absent from the House, thereby lessening the importance of the work of the committee and to render its members unpopular. Rep. Roscoe Conkling, Republican of New York, was an often vocal opponent of the committee, sharply denounced its work, maintaining that "the nation, the government, classes of individuals, and individuals themselves, had suffered in character; that we had lost caste, and that much harm had come, not from detecting or exposing fraud or extravagance, but from magnifying and exaggerating what had happened, and charging and publishing to the world what had never happened at all." Rep. Schuyler Colfax, Republican of Indiana, frequently joined Rep. Conkling in attacking the committee's work.

Other criticisms were levied at its original chairman, Charles Van Wyck. After the committee had been at work for several months, Rep. Van Wyck desired to investigate the mode of conducting business at the New York Customs House. The other committee members objected for lack of time. It was decided that Van Wyck would take the evidence while the other members continued their work of investigating government contracts. After collecting a large body of evidence, was instructed by the committee not to proceed in his investigations without further orders. The rest of the committee returned to New York, and after receiving testimony and evidence from the custom-house in its own defense, ordered the testimony taken by Mr. Van Wyck to be deposited with the Clerk of the House "subject only to the inspection of any member of the committee." Van Wyck was later suspended from conducting his investigations, which he alleged were because of "the clamor of the revenue officers and their friends."

Early on, Van Wyck's efforts to investigate the custom house as well as periodic absences from the committee had led the committee members to replace him as chairman and appointed Elihu B. Washburne in his place as acting chairman. When the committee's final report was submitted to the House on March 3, 1863, Van Wyck was given leave to present minority views of the committee to the full House, which per instruction were to be inspected by the other committee members. However, when the time came to review the report, it was nowhere to be found. Mr. Washburne alleged that a member of the House had contrived with a member of the clerk's office to "abstract," or remove, the report from the clerk's office, and he demanded the creation of a select committee to investigate the matter. In floor debate on the matter on March 3, charges were made that Van Wyck's minority report was nothing more than a baseless attack on the committee members, rather than focusing on the subject matter assigned to the committee. Rep. Washburne also alleged that Rep. Van Wyck's investigation of the customs house was a personal vendetta against the director of the Port of New York. At the behest of Rep. Washburne, the Select Committee on an Alleged Abstraction of a Report from the Clerk's Office that same day, but the House adjourned shortly thereafter, giving it no time to meet or report on its findings.

== Legislation ==
In spite of all the criticisms, the committee's investigation did lead to new legislation in 1862 for the prevention of fraud. Congress enacted legislation requiring that the Secretaries of the Navy, Interior, and War should put every contract made by them, or by officers appointed it, in writing and should have them signed with the names of the contractors, and also to file a copy in a "Returns Office" of Department of the Interior within 30 days. The officers making such contracts were to swear to them, and penalties were prescribed for violations of the law. The quartermaster-general of the Army convinced Congress that the law could not be then enforced, so congress enacted legislation on July 17 delaying its enforcement until the beginning of 1863.

Two months after the law began to operate, Congress resolved that the chief of any bureau of the navy department should be at liberty to reject the offers of those who had failed as principals or sureties on previous contracts to furnish naval supplies. In those made with the same bureau, one contractor could not be received as surety for another; every contract should require the delivery of a specified quantity, and no bids having nominal or fictitious prices could be considered.
