= The Indian Picture Opera =

Magic lantern slide show in early 1900s

The Indian Picture Opera was a traveling multimedia presentation created in 1911 by American photographer Edward S. Curtis to promote his book series The North American Indian, combining projected photographs, live orchestral music, and narration by Curtis.

== Background ==
In 1911, Edward S. Curtis created The Indian Picture Opera to assist in the promotion and sale of his book series, The North American Indian. This traveling slideshow utilized a Stereopticon projector to display photographs on screens in various cities across the United States. An orchestra provided live music during the presentations, drawing inspiration from Native American chants and rhythms. Curtis himself delivered the narration, offering explanations of the images and recounting stories about the Native American communities that he had spent several years photographing and studying.

== Reception ==
The Indian Picture Opera achieved success in New York City after newspaper reviews by The Evening World, the evening edition of The New York World, reported that the audience “taxed the capacity of the auditorium” and was “lifted out of the prosaic into the wild, romantic life” of Native Americans, from “the first pictures with barbaric, colorful musical setting to the last example of Mr. Curtis’s photographic art”. Another New York paper, The New-York Tribune, described the opera as “a decided addition to the authoritative information the present generation has of the race found on the continent”.

The show was widely described as a box office hit and highly entertaining for the audience. Despite being reviewed in a generally favorable manner, the 1911–1912 and 1912–1913 tours were unprofitable due to the cost of traveling with a show of their size (venue costs, transport for the orchestra, food and supplies, advertising, etc.) and ended shortly after the company's financial difficulties.

=== Historical context ===
Curtis documented the Indigenous peoples of the continent, particularly those in the West, as he considered it important to record what he regarded as a “vanishing race”. In accordance with prevailing attitudes among Americans at the time, Curtis believed that Indigenous peoples would eventually be assimilated into American society, and that their cultures, traditions, and languages would disappear entirely as more of their land was taken.

=== Legacy ===
Current opinion typically regards Curtis' works to be misleading. Owing to the staging of traditional costumes, scenes, the editing of photographs to remove modern objects (which conflict with the pre-industrial narrative of the works), and other anachronistic artistic choices which did not represent the reality of most Native Americans' lifestyles during the time. This approach reinforced racial stereotypes and led many to perceive Indigenous peoples as uncivilized and unintelligent, in addition to obscuring the reservation system within which his subjects actually lived.

=== Modern reinterpretation ===
Curtis's influence extended beyond his lifetime, with his visual documentation of Native American tribes continuing to serve as a valuable resource frequently cited in cultural and academic discussions. In 2006, a modern remake of The Indian Picture Opera was released on DVD. This version adhered to Curtis's original script, the music being reinterpreted within a contemporary multimedia format.

== Related works ==
In 1914, building on the success of The Indian Picture Opera, Curtis produced and directed In the Land of the Head Hunters, one of the earliest feature-length films to feature an exclusively Native American cast. This film further demonstrated his interest in documenting Indigenous cultures, although they attracted criticism for its staged scenes and fictionalized representations.
