= 79th United States Congress =

1945–1947 U.S. Congress

←	78th	80th	→
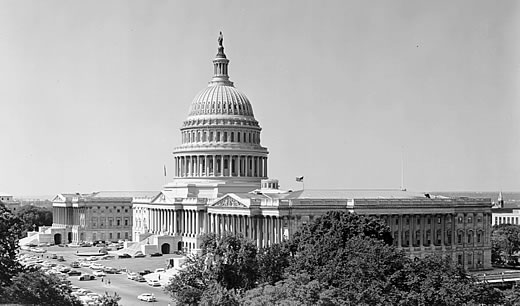
- United States Capitol (1956)

Overview
- Legislative body: United States Congress
- Jurisdiction: United States
- Term: January 3, 1945 – January 3, 1947

Senate
- Members: 96
- President: Henry A. Wallace (D) (Note: U.S. Vice President Henry A. Wallace's term as President of the Senate ended at noon January 20, 1945, when Harry S. Truman's term began.) (until January 20, 1945); Harry S. Truman (D) (Note: U.S. Vice President Truman's term as President of the Senate ended on April 12, 1945 when he ascended to the presidency. President pro tempore Kenneth McKellar acted his duties as the president of the Senate prior to the ratification of the Twenty-fifth Amendment.) (Jan 20–Apr 12, 1945); Vacant (from April 12, 1945)
- President pro tempore: Kenneth McKellar (D)
- Party control: Democratic

House of Representatives
- Members: 435 representatives 4 non-voting delegates
- Speaker: Sam Rayburn (D)
- Party control: Democratic

Sessions
- 1st: January 3, 1945 – December 21, 1945
- 2nd: January 14, 1946 – August 2, 1946

The 79th United States Congress was a meeting of the legislative branch of the United States federal government, composed of the United States Senate and the United States House of Representatives. It met in Washington, D.C., from January 3, 1945, to January 3, 1947, during the last months of Franklin D. Roosevelt's presidency, and the first two years of Harry Truman's presidency. The apportionment of seats in this House of Representatives was based on the 1940 United States census.

Both chambers had a Democratic majority (including increasing their edge in the House). With the reelection of President Franklin D. Roosevelt to a record fourth term, the Democrats maintained an overall federal government trifecta.

== Major events ==
- January 20, 1945: President Franklin D. Roosevelt began his fourth term.
- April 12, 1945: President Roosevelt died, Vice President Harry S. Truman became President of the United States.
- September 2, 1945: World War II ended.
- September 11, 1945 – June 20, 1946: Joint Committee on the Investigation of the Pearl Harbor Attack conducted its investigation and issued a report.
- November 6, 1946: 1946 United States Senate elections, 1946 United States House of Representatives elections: Republicans gained control of both houses.
- January 3, 1947: Proceedings of the U.S. Congress were televised for the first time.

== Major legislation ==
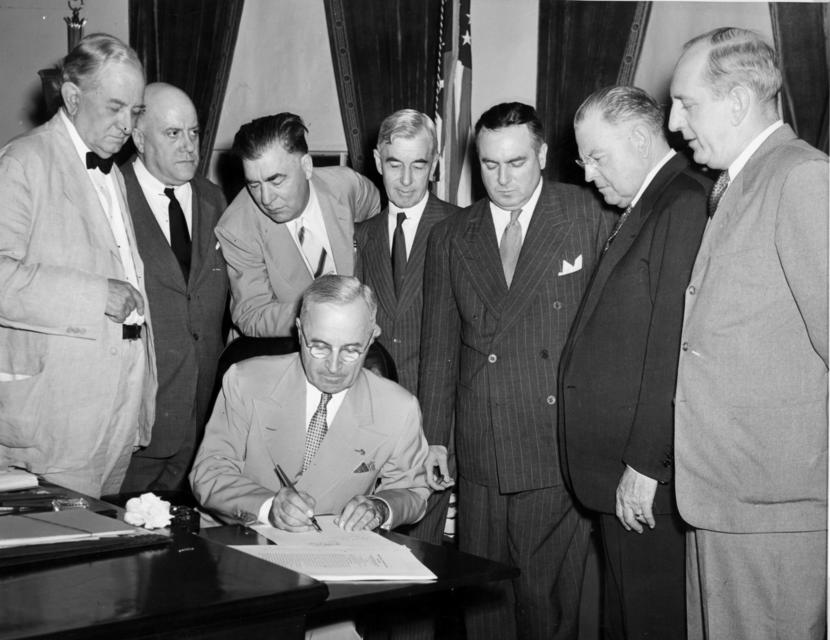
President Truman signs the Atomic Energy Act on August 1, 1946.

- March 9, 1945: McCarran-Ferguson Act
- July 31, 1945: Bretton Woods Agreements Act, Pub. L. 79–171
- July 31, 1945: Export-Import Bank Act of 1945
- December 20, 1945: United Nations Participation Act, Pub. L. 79–264, S. 1580, 59 Stat. 619, enacted December 20, 1945
- December 28, 1945: War Brides Act
- February 18, 1946: Rescission Act of 1946, Pub. L. 79–391
- February 20, 1946: Employment Act, Pub. L. 79–304, ch. 33, 60 Stat. 23
- May 13, 1946: Federal Airport Act of 1946, Pub. L. 79–377
- June 4, 1946: Richard B. Russell National School Lunch Act, ch. 281, 60 Stat. 230
- June 11, 1946: Administrative Procedure Act, ch. 324, Pub. L. 79–404, 60 Stat. 237
- July 2, 1946: Luce–Celler Act of 1946, Pub. L. 79–483
- July 3, 1946: Hobbs Anti-Racketeering Act, ch. 537, Pub. L. 79–486, 60 Stat. 420
- July 5, 1946: Lanham Trademark Act of 1946, Pub. L. 79–489
- August 1, 1946: United States Atomic Energy Act of 1946, ch. 724, Pub. L. 79–585, 60 Stat. 755
- August 2, 1946: Legislative Reorganization Act of 1946, Pub. L. 79–601, including Title III: Federal Regulation of Lobbying Act of 1946, Title IV: Federal Tort Claims Act, and Title V: General Bridge Act
- August 13, 1946: Foreign Service Act, ch. 957, titles I–X, 60 Stat. 999
- August 13, 1946: Hospital Survey and Construction Act (Hill-Burton Act), Pub. L. 79–725, ch. 958, 60 Stat. 1040

== Treaties ratified ==
- July 28, 1945: Senate ratified the Charter of the United Nations by a vote of 89–2.
- July 4, 1946: Senate ratified the Treaty of Manila, which gave independence to the Philippines.

== Party summary ==
=== Senate ===
	Party (shading shows control)			Total	Vacant
	Democratic (D)	Progressive (P)	Republican (R)	Total	Vacant
End of previous congress	56	1	39	96	0
Begin	57	1	38	96	0
End	53	1	42	96	0
Final voting share	55.2%	1.0%	43.8%		
Beginning of next congress	45	0	51	96	0

=== House of Representatives ===
	Party (shading shows control)					Total	Vacant
	Democratic (D)	Farmer– Labor (FL)	American Labor (AL)	Progressive (P)	Republican (R)	Total	Vacant
End of previous congress	212	1	1	2	210	426	9
Begin	242	0	1	1	190	434	1
End	236	0	1	1	191	429	6
Final voting share	55.0%	0.0%	0.2%	0.2%	44.5%		
Beginning of next congress	187	0	1	0	245	433	2

== Leadership ==
=== Senate ===
- President:
  - Henry A. Wallace (D), until January 20, 1945
  - Harry S. Truman (D), January 20, 1945 – April 12, 1945; thereafter vacant
- President Pro Tempore: Kenneth McKellar (D)
- Majority leader: Alben W. Barkley (D)
- Minority leader: Wallace H. White Jr. (R, acting)
- Majority whip: J. Lister Hill (D)
- Minority whip: Kenneth S. Wherry (R), elected 1944

=== House of Representatives ===
- Speaker: Sam Rayburn (D)
- Majority leader: John W. McCormack (D)
- Minority leader: Joseph W. Martin Jr. (R)
- Majority whip: John Sparkman (D)
- Minority whip: Leslie C. Arends (R)

== Members ==
=== Senate ===
Senators are popularly elected statewide every two years, with one-third beginning new six-year terms with each Congress. Preceding the names in the list below are Senate class numbers, which indicate the cycle of their election, In this Congress, Class 1 meant their term ended with this Congress, facing re-election in 1946; Class 2 meant their term began in the last Congress, facing re-election in 1948; and Class 3 meant their term began in this Congress, facing re-election in 1950.

==== Alabama ====
▌2. John H. Bankhead II (D), until June 12, 1946

▌George R. Swift (D), June 15, 1946 – November 5, 1946
▌John Sparkman (D), from November 6, 1946

▌3. J. Lister Hill (D)

==== Arizona ====
▌1. Ernest McFarland (D)
▌3. Carl Hayden (D)

==== Arkansas ====
▌2. John L. McClellan (D)
▌3. J. William Fulbright (D)

==== California ====
▌1. Hiram Johnson (R), until August 6, 1945

▌William Knowland (R), from August 26, 1945

▌3. Sheridan Downey (D)

==== Colorado ====
▌2. Edwin C. Johnson (D)
▌3. Eugene Millikin (R)

==== Connecticut ====
▌1. Francis T. Maloney (D), until January 16, 1945

▌Thomas C. Hart (R), February 15, 1945 – November 5, 1946
▌Raymond E. Baldwin (R), from December 27, 1946

▌3. Brien McMahon (D)

==== Delaware ====
▌1. James M. Tunnell (D)
▌2. C. Douglass Buck (R)

==== Florida ====
▌1. Charles O. Andrews (D), until September 18, 1946

▌Spessard Holland (D), from September 25, 1946

▌3. Claude Pepper (D)

==== Georgia ====
▌2. Richard Russell Jr. (D)
▌3. Walter F. George (D)

==== Idaho ====
▌2. John Thomas (R), until November 10, 1945

▌Charles C. Gossett (D), November 17, 1945 – November 6, 1946
▌Henry Dworshak (R), from November 6, 1946

▌3. Glen H. Taylor (D)

==== Illinois ====
▌2. C. Wayland Brooks (R)
▌3. Scott W. Lucas (D)

==== Indiana ====
▌1. Raymond E. Willis (R)
▌3. Homer E. Capehart (R)

==== Iowa ====
▌2. George A. Wilson (R)
▌3. Bourke B. Hickenlooper (R)

==== Kansas ====
▌2. Arthur Capper (R)
▌3. Clyde M. Reed (R)

==== Kentucky ====
▌2. Happy Chandler (D), until November 1, 1945

▌William A. Stanfill (R), November 19, 1945 – November 5, 1946
▌John Sherman Cooper (R), from November 6, 1946

▌3. Alben W. Barkley (D)

==== Louisiana ====
▌2. Allen J. Ellender (D)
▌3. John H. Overton (D)

==== Maine ====
▌1. Owen Brewster (R)
▌2. Wallace H. White (R)

==== Maryland ====
▌1. George L. P. Radcliffe (D)
▌3. Millard Tydings (D)

==== Massachusetts ====
▌1. David I. Walsh (D)
▌2. Leverett Saltonstall (R)

==== Michigan ====
▌1. Arthur Vandenberg (R)
▌2. Homer S. Ferguson (R)

==== Minnesota ====
▌1. Henrik Shipstead (R)
▌2. Joseph H. Ball (R)

==== Mississippi ====
▌1. Theodore G. Bilbo (D)
▌2. James Eastland (D)

==== Missouri ====
▌1. Harry S. Truman (D), until January 17, 1945

▌Frank P. Briggs (D), from January 18, 1945

▌3. Forrest C. Donnell (R)

==== Montana ====
▌1. Burton K. Wheeler (D)
▌2. James E. Murray (D)

==== Nebraska ====
▌1. Hugh A. Butler (R)
▌2. Kenneth S. Wherry (R)

==== Nevada ====
▌1. James G. Scrugham (D), until June 23, 1945

▌Edward P. Carville (D), from July 25, 1945

▌3. Pat McCarran (D)

==== New Hampshire ====
▌2. Styles Bridges (R)
▌3. Charles W. Tobey (R)

==== New Jersey ====
▌1. H. Alexander Smith (R)
▌2. Albert W. Hawkes (R)

==== New Mexico ====
▌1. Dennis Chávez (D)
▌2. Carl Hatch (D)

==== New York ====
▌1. James M. Mead (D)
▌3. Robert F. Wagner (D)

==== North Carolina ====
▌2. Josiah Bailey (D), until December 15, 1946

▌William B. Umstead (D), from December 18, 1946

▌3. Clyde R. Hoey (D)

==== North Dakota ====
▌1. William Langer (R-NPL)
▌3. John Moses (D), until March 3, 1945

▌Milton Young (R), from March 12, 1945

==== Ohio ====
▌1. Harold H. Burton (R), until September 30, 1945

▌James W. Huffman (D), October 8, 1945 – November 5, 1946
▌Kingsley A. Taft (R), from November 6, 1946

▌3. Robert A. Taft (R)

==== Oklahoma ====
▌2. Edward H. Moore (R)
▌3. Elmer Thomas (D)

==== Oregon ====
▌2. Guy Cordon (R)
▌3. Wayne Morse (R)

==== Pennsylvania ====
▌1. Joseph F. Guffey (D)
▌3. Francis J. Myers (D)

==== Rhode Island ====
▌1. Peter G. Gerry (D)
▌2. Theodore F. Green (D)

==== South Carolina ====
▌2. Burnet R. Maybank (D)
▌3. Olin D. Johnston (D)

==== South Dakota ====
▌2. Harlan J. Bushfield (R)
▌3. Chan Gurney (R)

==== Tennessee ====
▌1. Kenneth McKellar (D)
▌2. Tom Stewart (D)

==== Texas ====
▌1. Tom Connally (D)
▌2. W. Lee O'Daniel (D)

==== Utah ====
▌1. Abe Murdock (D)
▌3. Elbert D. Thomas (D)

==== Vermont ====
▌1. Warren Austin (R), until August 2, 1946

▌Ralph Flanders (R), from November 1, 1946

▌3. George Aiken (R)

==== Virginia ====
▌1. Harry F. Byrd (D)
▌2. Carter Glass (D), until May 28, 1946

▌Thomas G. Burch (D), May 31, 1946 – November 5, 1946
▌A. Willis Robertson (D), from November 6, 1946

==== Washington ====
▌1. Monrad Wallgren (D), until January 9, 1945

▌Hugh Mitchell (D), January 10, 1945 – December 25, 1946
▌Harry P. Cain (R), from December 26, 1946

▌3. Warren Magnuson (D)

==== West Virginia ====
▌1. Harley M. Kilgore (D)
▌2. Chapman Revercomb (R)

==== Wisconsin ====
▌1. Robert M. La Follette Jr. (P)
▌3. Alexander Wiley (R)

==== Wyoming ====
▌1. Joseph C. O'Mahoney (D)
▌2. Edward V. Robertson (R)

Senators' party membership by state at the opening of the 79th Congress in January 1945. The green stripes denote Senator Robert M. La Follette Jr. of the Progressive Party. 2 Democrats 1 Democrat and 1 Republican 2 Republicans

=== House of Representatives ===
The names of representatives are preceded by their district numbers.

==== Alabama ====
▌1. Frank W. Boykin (D)
▌2. George M. Grant (D)
▌3. George W. Andrews (D)
▌4. Sam Hobbs (D)
▌5. Albert Rains (D)
▌6. Pete Jarman (D)
▌7. Carter Manasco (D)
▌8. John Sparkman (D), until November 6, 1946, vacant thereafter
▌9. Luther Patrick (D)

==== Arizona ====
▌At-large. John R. Murdock (D)
▌At-large. Richard F. Harless (D)

==== Arkansas ====
▌1. Ezekiel C. Gathings (D)
▌2. Wilbur Mills (D)
▌3. James William Trimble (D)
▌4. William Fadjo Cravens (D)
▌5. Brooks Hays (D)
▌6. William F. Norrell (D)
▌7. Oren Harris (D)

==== California ====
▌1. Clarence F. Lea (D)
▌2. Clair Engle (D)
▌3. J. Leroy Johnson (R)
▌4. Franck R. Havenner (D)
▌5. Richard J. Welch (R)
▌6. George P. Miller (D)
▌7. John H. Tolan (D)
▌8. Jack Z. Anderson (R)
▌9. Bertrand W. Gearhart (R)
▌10. Alfred J. Elliott (D)
▌11. George E. Outland (D)
▌12. Jerry Voorhis (D)
▌13. Ned R. Healy (D)
▌14. Helen Gahagan Douglas (D)
▌15. Gordon L. McDonough (R)
▌16. Ellis E. Patterson (D)
▌17. Cecil R. King (D)
▌18. Clyde Doyle (D)
▌19. Chet Holifield (D)
▌20. Carl Hinshaw (R)
▌21. Harry R. Sheppard (D)
▌22. John R. Phillips (R)
▌23. Edouard Izac (D)

==== Colorado ====
▌1. Dean M. Gillespie (R)
▌2. William S. Hill (R)
▌3. John Chenoweth (R)
▌4. Robert F. Rockwell (R)

==== Connecticut ====
▌1. Herman P. Kopplemann (D)
▌2. Chase G. Woodhouse (D)
▌3. James P. Geelan (D)
▌4. Clare Boothe Luce (R)
▌5. Joseph E. Talbot (R)
▌At-large. Joseph F. Ryter (D)

==== Delaware ====
▌At-large. Philip A. Traynor (D)

==== Florida ====
▌1. J. Hardin Peterson (D)
▌2. Emory H. Price (D)
▌3. Bob Sikes (D)
▌4. Pat Cannon (D)
▌5. Joe Hendricks (D)
▌6. Dwight L. Rogers (D)

==== Georgia ====
▌1. Hugh Peterson (D)
▌2. E. Eugene Cox (D)
▌3. Stephen Pace (D)
▌4. A. Sidney Camp (D)
▌5. Robert Ramspeck (D), until December 31, 1945

▌Helen Douglas Mankin (D), from February 12, 1946

▌6. Carl Vinson (D)
▌7. Malcolm C. Tarver (D)
▌8. John S. Gibson (D)
▌9. John Stephens Wood (D)
▌10. Paul Brown (D)

==== Idaho ====
▌1. Compton I. White (D)
▌2. Henry Dworshak (R), until November 5, 1946, vacant thereafter

==== Illinois ====
▌1. William L. Dawson (D)
▌2. William A. Rowan (D)
▌3. Edward A. Kelly (D)
▌4. Martin Gorski (D)
▌5. Adolph J. Sabath (D)
▌6. Thomas J. O'Brien (D)
▌7. William W. Link (D)
▌8. Thomas S. Gordon (D)
▌9. Alexander J. Resa (D)
▌10. Ralph E. Church (R)
▌11. Chauncey W. Reed (R)
▌12. Noah M. Mason (R)
▌13. Leo E. Allen (R)
▌14. Anton J. Johnson (R)
▌15. Robert B. Chiperfield (R)
▌16. Everett Dirksen (R)
▌17. Leslie C. Arends (R)
▌18. Jessie Sumner (R)
▌19. Rolla C. McMillen (R)
▌20. Sid Simpson (R)
▌21. George Evan Howell (R)
▌22. Melvin Price (D)
▌23. Charles W. Vursell (R)
▌24. James V. Heidinger (R), until March 22, 1945

▌Roy Clippinger (R), from November 6, 1945

▌25. C. W. Bishop (R)
▌At-large. Emily Taft Douglas (D)

==== Indiana ====
▌1. Ray Madden (D)
▌2. Charles A. Halleck (R)
▌3. Robert A. Grant (R)
▌4. George W. Gillie (R)
▌5. Forest Harness (R)
▌6. Noble J. Johnson (R)
▌7. Gerald W. Landis (R)
▌8. Charles M. La Follette (R)
▌9. Earl Wilson (R)
▌10. Raymond S. Springer (R)
▌11. Louis Ludlow (D)

==== Iowa ====
▌1. Thomas E. Martin (R)
▌2. Henry O. Talle (R)
▌3. John W. Gwynne (R)
▌4. Karl M. LeCompte (R)
▌5. Paul H. Cunningham (R)
▌6. James I. Dolliver (R)
▌7. Ben F. Jensen (R)
▌8. Charles B. Hoeven (R)

==== Kansas ====
▌1. Albert M. Cole (R)
▌2. Errett P. Scrivner (R)
▌3. Thomas Daniel Winter (R)
▌4. Edward Herbert Rees (R)
▌5. Clifford R. Hope (R)
▌6. Frank Carlson (R)

==== Kentucky ====
▌1. Noble J. Gregory (D)
▌2. Earle C. Clements (D)
▌3. Emmet O'Neal (D)
▌4. Frank Chelf (D)
▌5. Brent Spence (D)
▌6. Virgil Chapman (D)
▌7. Andrew J. May (D)
▌8. Joe B. Bates (D)
▌9. John M. Robsion (R)

==== Louisiana ====
▌1. F. Edward Hébert (D)
▌2. Paul H. Maloney (D)
▌3. James R. Domengeaux (D)
▌4. Overton Brooks (D)
▌5. Charles E. McKenzie (D)
▌6. James H. Morrison (D)
▌7. Henry D. Larcade Jr. (D)
▌8. A. Leonard Allen (D)

==== Maine ====
▌1. Robert Hale (R)
▌2. Margaret Chase Smith (R)
▌3. Frank Fellows (R)

==== Maryland ====
▌1. Dudley Roe (D)
▌2. Harry Streett Baldwin (D)
▌3. Thomas D'Alesandro Jr. (D)
▌4. George Hyde Fallon (D)
▌5. Lansdale G. Sasscer (D)
▌6. James Glenn Beall (R)

==== Massachusetts ====
▌1. John W. Heselton (R)
▌2. Charles Clason (R)
▌3. Philip J. Philbin (D)
▌4. Pehr G. Holmes (R)
▌5. Edith Nourse Rogers (R)
▌6. George J. Bates (R)
▌7. Thomas J. Lane (D)
▌8. Angier Goodwin (R)
▌9. Charles L. Gifford (R)
▌10. Christian Herter (R)
▌11. James Michael Curley (D)
▌12. John W. McCormack (D)
▌13. Richard B. Wigglesworth (R)
▌14. Joseph W. Martin Jr. (R)

==== Michigan ====
▌1. George G. Sadowski (D)
▌2. Earl C. Michener (R)
▌3. Paul W. Shafer (R)
▌4. Clare E. Hoffman (R)
▌5. Bartel J. Jonkman (R)
▌6. William W. Blackney (R)
▌7. Jesse P. Wolcott (R)
▌8. Fred L. Crawford (R)
▌9. Albert J. Engel (R)
▌10. Roy O. Woodruff (R)
▌11. Fred Bradley (R)
▌12. Frank Hook (D)
▌13. George D. O'Brien (D)
▌14. Louis C. Rabaut (D)
▌15. John D. Dingell Sr. (D)
▌16. John Lesinski Sr. (D)
▌17. George A. Dondero (R)

==== Minnesota ====
▌1. August H. Andresen (R)
▌2. Joseph P. O'Hara (R)
▌3. William Gallagher (DFL) (Note: The Minnesota Democratic–Farmer–Labor Party (DFL) is the Minnesota affiliate of the U.S. Democratic Party and are counted as Democrats.), until August 13, 1946
▌4. Frank Starkey (DFL)
▌5. Walter Judd (R)
▌6. Harold Knutson (R)
▌7. Herman Carl Andersen (R)
▌8. William Pittenger (R)
▌9. Harold Hagen (R)

==== Mississippi ====
▌1. John E. Rankin (D)
▌2. Jamie L. Whitten (D)
▌3. William M. Whittington (D)
▌4. Thomas Abernethy (D)
▌5. W. Arthur Winstead (D)
▌6. William M. Colmer (D)
▌7. Dan R. McGehee (D)

==== Missouri ====
▌1. Samuel W. Arnold (R)
▌2. Max Schwabe (R)
▌3. William Clay Cole (R)
▌4. C. Jasper Bell (D)
▌5. Roger C. Slaughter (D)
▌6. Marion T. Bennett (R)
▌7. Dewey Short (R)
▌8. A. S. J. Carnahan (D)
▌9. Clarence Cannon (D)
▌10. Orville Zimmerman (D)
▌11. John B. Sullivan (D)
▌12. Walter C. Ploeser (R)
▌13. John J. Cochran (D)

==== Montana ====
▌1. Mike Mansfield (D)
▌2. James F. O'Connor (D), until January 15, 1945

▌Wesley A. D'Ewart (R), from June 5, 1945

==== Nebraska ====
▌1. Carl Curtis (R)
▌2. Howard Buffett (R)
▌3. Karl Stefan (R)
▌4. Arthur L. Miller (R)

==== Nevada ====
▌At-large. Berkeley L. Bunker (D)

==== New Hampshire ====
▌1. Chester Earl Merrow (R)
▌2. Sherman Adams (R)

==== New Jersey ====
▌1. Charles A. Wolverton (R)
▌2. T. Millet Hand (R)
▌3. James C. Auchincloss (R)
▌4. D. Lane Powers (R), until August 30, 1945

▌Frank A. Mathews Jr. (R), from November 6, 1945

▌5. Charles A. Eaton (R)
▌6. Clifford P. Case (R)
▌7. J. Parnell Thomas (R)
▌8. Gordon Canfield (R)
▌9. Harry L. Towe (R)
▌10. Fred A. Hartley Jr. (R)
▌11. Frank Sundstrom (R)
▌12. Robert Kean (R)
▌13. Mary T. Norton (D)
▌14. Edward J. Hart (D)

==== New Mexico ====
▌At-large. Clinton P. Anderson (D), until June 30, 1945, vacant thereafter
▌At-large. Antonio M. Fernández (D)

==== New York ====
▌1. Edgar A. Sharp (R)
▌2. Leonard W. Hall (R)
▌3. Henry J. Latham (R)
▌4. William B. Barry (D), until October 20, 1946, vacant thereafter
▌5. James A. Roe (D)
▌6. James J. Delaney (D)
▌7. John J. Delaney (D)
▌8. Joseph L. Pfeifer (D)
▌9. Eugene J. Keogh (D)
▌10. Andrew L. Somers (D)
▌11. James J. Heffernan (D)
▌12. John J. Rooney (D)
▌13. Donald L. O'Toole (D)
▌14. Leo F. Rayfiel (D)
▌15. Emanuel Celler (D)
▌16. Ellsworth B. Buck (R)
▌17. Joseph C. Baldwin (R)
▌18. Vito Marcantonio (AL)
▌19. Samuel Dickstein (D), until December 30, 1945

▌Arthur George Klein (D), from February 19, 1946

▌20. Sol Bloom (D)
▌21. James H. Torrens (D)
▌22. Adam Clayton Powell Jr. (D)
▌23. Walter A. Lynch (D)
▌24. Benjamin J. Rabin (D)
▌25. Charles A. Buckley (D)
▌26. Peter A. Quinn (D)
▌27. Ralph W. Gwinn (R)
▌28. Ralph A. Gamble (R)
▌29. Augustus W. Bennet (R)
▌30. Jay Le Fevre (R)
▌31. Bernard W. Kearney (R)
▌32. William T. Byrne (D)
▌33. Dean P. Taylor (R)
▌34. Clarence E. Kilburn (R)
▌35. Hadwen C. Fuller (R)
▌36. Clarence E. Hancock (R)
▌37. Edwin Arthur Hall (R)
▌38. John Taber (R)
▌39. W. Sterling Cole (R)
▌40. George F. Rogers (D)
▌41. James W. Wadsworth Jr. (R)
▌42. Walter G. Andrews (R)
▌43. Edward J. Elsaesser (R)
▌44. John Cornelius Butler (R)
▌45. Daniel A. Reed (R)

==== North Carolina ====
▌1. Herbert Covington Bonner (D)
▌2. John H. Kerr (D)
▌3. Graham A. Barden (D)
▌4. Harold D. Cooley (D)
▌5. John Hamlin Folger (D)
▌6. Carl T. Durham (D)
▌7. J. Bayard Clark (D)
▌8. William O. Burgin (D), until April 11, 1946

▌Eliza Jane Pratt (D), from May 25, 1946

▌9. Robert L. Doughton (D)
▌10. Joseph Wilson Ervin (D), until December 25, 1945

▌Sam Ervin (D), from January 22, 1946

▌11. Alfred L. Bulwinkle (D)
▌12. Zebulon Weaver (D)

==== North Dakota ====
▌At-large. William Lemke (R-NPL)
▌At-large. Charles R. Robertson (R)

==== Ohio ====
▌1. Charles H. Elston (R)
▌2. William E. Hess (R)
▌3. Edward J. Gardner (D)
▌4. Robert Franklin Jones (R)
▌5. Cliff Clevenger (R)
▌6. Edward O. McCowen (R)
▌7. Clarence J. Brown (R)
▌8. Frederick Cleveland Smith (R)
▌9. Homer A. Ramey (R)
▌10. Thomas A. Jenkins (R)
▌11. Walter E. Brehm (R)
▌12. John M. Vorys (R)
▌13. Alvin F. Weichel (R)
▌14. Walter B. Huber (D)
▌15. Percy W. Griffiths (R)
▌16. William R. Thom (D)
▌17. J. Harry McGregor (R)
▌18. Earl R. Lewis (R)
▌19. Michael J. Kirwan (D)
▌20. Michael A. Feighan (D)
▌21. Robert Crosser (D)
▌22. Frances P. Bolton (R)
▌At-large. George H. Bender (R)

==== Oklahoma ====
▌1. George B. Schwabe (R)
▌2. William G. Stigler (D)
▌3. Paul Stewart (D)
▌4. Lyle Boren (D)
▌5. A. S. Mike Monroney (D)
▌6. Jed J. Johnson (D)
▌7. Victor Wickersham (D)
▌8. Ross Rizley (R)

==== Oregon ====
▌1. James W. Mott (R), until November 12, 1945

▌A. Walter Norblad (R), from January 18, 1946

▌2. Lowell Stockman (R)
▌3. Homer D. Angell (R)
▌4. Harris Ellsworth (R)

==== Pennsylvania ====
▌1. William A. Barrett (D)
▌2. William T. Granahan (D)
▌3. Michael J. Bradley (D)
▌4. John E. Sheridan (D)
▌5. William J. Green Jr. (D)
▌6. Herbert J. McGlinchey (D)
▌7. James Wolfenden (R)
▌8. Charles L. Gerlach (R)
▌9. J. Roland Kinzer (R)
▌10. John W. Murphy (D), until July 17, 1946

▌James P. Scoblick (R), from November 5, 1946

▌11. Dan Flood (D)
▌12. Ivor D. Fenton (R)
▌13. Daniel K. Hoch (D)
▌14. Wilson D. Gillette (R)
▌15. Robert F. Rich (R)
▌16. Samuel K. McConnell Jr. (R)
▌17. Richard M. Simpson (R)
▌18. John C. Kunkel (R)
▌19. Leon H. Gavin (R)
▌20. Francis E. Walter (D)
▌21. Chester H. Gross (R)
▌22. D. Emmert Brumbaugh (R)
▌23. J. Buell Snyder (D), until February 24, 1946

▌Carl Henry Hoffman (R), from May 21, 1946

▌24. Thomas E. Morgan (D)
▌25. Louis E. Graham (R)
▌26. Harve Tibbott (R)
▌27. Augustine B. Kelley (D)
▌28. Robert L. Rodgers (R)
▌29. Howard E. Campbell (R)
▌30. Robert J. Corbett (R)
▌31. James G. Fulton (R)
▌32. Herman P. Eberharter (D)
▌33. Samuel A. Weiss (D), until January 7, 1946

▌Frank Buchanan (D), from May 21, 1946

==== Rhode Island ====
▌1. Aime Forand (D)
▌2. John E. Fogarty (D), from February 7, 1945

==== South Carolina ====
▌1. L. Mendel Rivers (D)
▌2. John J. Riley (D)
▌3. Butler B. Hare (D)
▌4. Joseph R. Bryson (D)
▌5. James P. Richards (D)
▌6. John L. McMillan (D)

==== South Dakota ====
▌1. Karl E. Mundt (R)
▌2. Francis Case (R)

==== Tennessee ====
▌1. B. Carroll Reece (R)
▌2. John Jennings Jr. (R)
▌3. Estes Kefauver (D)
▌4. Albert Gore Sr. (D)
▌5. Harold Earthman (D)
▌6. Percy Priest (D)
▌7. W. Wirt Courtney (D)
▌8. Tom J. Murray (D)
▌9. Jere Cooper (D)
▌10. Clifford Davis (D)

==== Texas ====
▌1. Wright Patman (D)
▌2. Jesse M. Combs (D)
▌3. Lindley Beckworth (D)
▌4. Sam Rayburn (D)
▌5. Hatton W. Sumners (D)
▌6. Luther Alexander Johnson (D), until July 17, 1946

▌Olin E. Teague (D), from August 24, 1946

▌7. Tom Pickett (D)
▌8. Albert Thomas (D)
▌9. Joseph J. Mansfield (D)
▌10. Lyndon B. Johnson (D)
▌11. William R. Poage (D)
▌12. Fritz G. Lanham (D)
▌13. Ed Gossett (D)
▌14. John E. Lyle Jr. (D)
▌15. Milton H. West (D)
▌16. R. Ewing Thomason (D)
▌17. Sam M. Russell (D)
▌18. Eugene Worley (D)
▌19. George H. Mahon (D)
▌20. Paul J. Kilday (D)
▌21. O. C. Fisher (D)

==== Utah ====
▌1. Walter K. Granger (D)
▌2. J. W. Robinson (D)

==== Vermont ====
▌At-large. Charles A. Plumley (R)

==== Virginia ====
▌1. S. Otis Bland (D)
▌2. Ralph Hunter Daughton (D)
▌3. Dave E. Satterfield Jr. (D), until February 15, 1945

▌J. Vaughan Gary (D), from March 6, 1945

▌4. Patrick H. Drewry (D)
▌5. Thomas G. Burch (D), until May 31, 1946

▌Thomas B. Stanley (D), from November 5, 1946

▌6. Clifton A. Woodrum (D), until December 31, 1945

▌J. Lindsay Almond (D), from January 22, 1946

▌7. A. Willis Robertson (D), until November 5, 1946

▌Burr Harrison (D), from November 5, 1946

▌8. Howard W. Smith (D)
▌9. John W. Flannagan Jr. (D)

==== Washington ====
▌1. Hugh De Lacy (D)
▌2. Henry M. Jackson (D)
▌3. Charles R. Savage (D)
▌4. Hal Holmes (R)
▌5. Walt Horan (R)
▌6. John M. Coffee (D)

==== West Virginia ====
▌1. Matthew M. Neely (D)
▌2. Jennings Randolph (D)
▌3. Cleveland M. Bailey (D)
▌4. Hubert S. Ellis (R)
▌5. John Kee (D)
▌6. E. H. Hedrick (D)

==== Wisconsin ====
▌1. Lawrence H. Smith (R)
▌2. Robert K. Henry (R), until November 20, 1946, vacant thereafter
▌3. William H. Stevenson (R)
▌4. Thad F. Wasielewski (D)
▌5. Andrew J. Biemiller (D)
▌6. Frank Bateman Keefe (R)
▌7. Reid F. Murray (R)
▌8. John W. Byrnes (R)
▌9. Merlin Hull (P)
▌10. Alvin O'Konski (R)

==== Wyoming ====
▌At-large. Frank A. Barrett (R)

==== Non-voting members ====
▌Alaska Territory: Bob Bartlett (D)
▌Hawaii Territory: Joseph Rider Farrington (R)
▌Philippines: Carlos Peña Romulo (Lib.), until July 4, 1946
▌▌Puerto Rico: Jesús T. Piñero Jiménez (PPD), until September 2, 1946

▌▌Antonio Fernós-Isern (PPD), from September 11, 1946

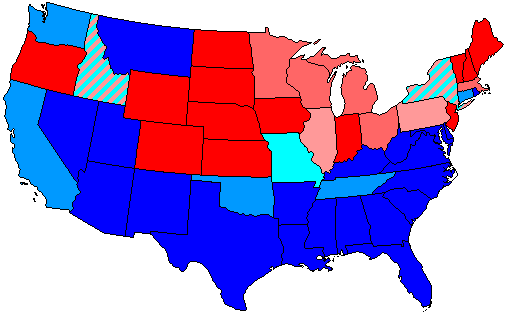
House seats by party holding plurality in state: 80+% Democratic / 80+% Republican; 60+% to 80% Democratic / 60+% to 80% Republican; Up to 60% Democratic / Up to 60% Republican

== Changes in membership ==
The count below reflects changes from the beginning of this Congress.

=== Senate ===
Missouri
(3)

Senate changes
State (class)	Vacated by	Reason for change	Successor	Date of successor's formal installation (Note: When seated or oath administered, not necessarily when service began.)					
Vacant	Senator-elect Donnell chose to remain as Governor of Missouri until his term expired and to fulfill a fairness pledge that his elected successor appoint Harry A. Truman's successor in the Senate	Forrest Donnell (R)	January 16, 1945	-	Washington (1)	Monrad Wallgren (D)	Resigned January 9, 1945, after being elected Governor of Washington. Successor was appointed to serve until the next election.	Hugh Mitchell (D)	January 10, 1945
Connecticut (1)	Francis T. Maloney (D)	Died January 16, 1945. Successor was appointed to serve until a special election.	Thomas C. Hart (R)	February 15, 1945					
Missouri (1)	Harry S. Truman (D)	Resigned January 17, 1945, after being elected Vice President of the United States. Successor was appointed to serve until the next election.	Frank P. Briggs (D)	January 18, 1945					
North Dakota (3)	John Moses (D)	Died March 3, 1945. Successor was appointed to serve until a special election, which he subsequently won.	Milton Young (R)	March 12, 1945					
Nevada (1)	James G. Scrugham (D)	Died June 23, 1945. Successor was appointed to serve until the next election.	Edward P. Carville (D)	July 25, 1945					
California (1)	Hiram Johnson (R)	Died August 6, 1945. Successor was appointed to serve until a special election, which he subsequently won.	William F. Knowland (R)	August 26, 1945					
Ohio (1)	Harold H. Burton (R)	Resigned September 30, 1945, after being appointed an Associate Justice of the Supreme Court of the United States. Successor was appointed to serve until a special election.	James W. Huffman (D)	October 8, 1945					
Kentucky (2)	Happy Chandler (D)	Resigned November 1, 1945, after becoming Commissioner of Major League Baseball. Successor was appointed to serve until a special election.	William A. Stanfill (R)	November 19, 1945					
Idaho (2)	John Thomas (R)	Died November 10, 1945. Successor was appointed to serve until a special election, which he subsequently lost.	Charles C. Gossett (D)	November 17, 1945					
Virginia (2)	Carter Glass (D)	Died May 28, 1946. Successor was appointed to serve until a special election.	Thomas G. Burch (D)	May 31, 1946					
Alabama (2)	John H. Bankhead II (D)	Died June 12, 1946. Successor was appointed to serve until a special election.	George R. Swift (D)	June 15, 1946					
Vermont (1)	Warren Austin (R)	Resigned August 2, 1946, after being appointed United States representative on the United Nations Security Council. Successor was appointed to serve until the next election.	Ralph Flanders (R)	November 1, 1946					
Florida (1)	Charles O. Andrews (D)	Died September 18, 1946. Successor was elected to finish term.	Spessard Holland (D)	September 25, 1946					
Alabama (2)	George R. Swift (D)	Resigned November 5, 1946. Successor was elected to finish term.	John Sparkman (D)	November 6, 1946					
Connecticut (1)	Thomas C. Hart (R)	Resigned November 5, 1946. Successor was elected to finish term.	Raymond E. Baldwin (R)	December 27, 1946					
Kentucky (2)	William A. Stanfill (R)	Resigned November 5, 1946. Successor was elected to finish term	John S. Cooper (R)	November 6, 1946					
Ohio (1)	James W. Huffman (D)	Resigned November 5, 1946. Successor was elected to finish term.	Kingsley A. Taft (R)	November 6, 1946					
Virginia (2)	Thomas G. Burch (D)	Resigned November 5, 1946. Successor was elected to finish term.	Absalom W. Robertson (D)	November 6, 1946					
Idaho (2)	Charles C. Gossett (D)	Resigned November 6, 1946. Successor was elected to finish term.	Henry Dworshak (R)	November 6, 1946					
North Carolina (2)	Josiah Bailey (D)	Died December 15, 1946. Successor was appointed to serve until a special election, which he subsequently lost.	William B. Umstead (D)	December 18, 1946					
Washington (1)	Hugh Mitchell (D)	Resigned December 25, 1946. Successor was appointed to finish the term already having to be elected the next term.	Harry P. Cain (R)	December 26, 1946					

=== House of Representatives ===
House changes
District	Vacated by	Reason for change	Successor	Date of successor's formal installation
Rhode Island 2nd	Vacant	John E. Fogarty resigned during the previous Congress.	John E. Fogarty (D)	February 7, 1945
Montana 2nd	James F. O'Connor (D)	Died January 15, 1945	Wesley A. D'Ewart (R)	June 5, 1945
Virginia 3rd	Dave E. Satterfield Jr. (D)	Resigned February 15, 1945, to become general counsel and executive director of the Life Insurance Association of America	J. Vaughan Gary (D)	March 6, 1945
Illinois 24th	James V. Heidinger (R)	Died March 22, 1945	Roy Clippinger (R)	November 6, 1945
New Mexico at-large	Clinton P. Anderson (D)	Resigned June 30, 1945, after being appointed Secretary of Agriculture	Vacant	Not filled this term
New Jersey 4th	D. Lane Powers (R)	Resigned August 30, 1945, to become a member of the Public Utilities Commission of New Jersey	Frank A. Mathews Jr. (R)	November 6, 1945
Oregon 1st	James W. Mott (R)	Died November 12, 1945	A. Walter Norblad (R)	January 18, 1946
North Carolina 10th	Joseph W. Ervin (D)	Died December 25, 1945	Sam Ervin (D)	January 22, 1946
New York 19th	Samuel Dickstein (D)	Resigned December 30, 1945	Arthur G. Klein (D)	February 19, 1946
Virginia 6th	Clifton A. Woodrum (D)	Resigned December 31, 1945, to become president of the American Plant Food Council, Inc.	J. Lindsay Almond (D)	January 22, 1946
Georgia 5th	Robert Ramspeck (D)	Resigned December 31, 1945, to become executive vice-president of the Air Transport Association	Helen D. Mankin (D)	February 12, 1946
Pennsylvania 33rd	Samuel A. Weiss (D)	Resigned January 7, 1946, after being elected judge of Common Pleas in Allegheny County, Pennsylvania	Frank Buchanan (D)	May 21, 1946
Pennsylvania 23rd	J. Buell Snyder (D)	Died February 24, 1946	Carl H. Hoffman (R)	May 21, 1946
North Carolina 8th	William O. Burgin (D)	Died April 11, 1946	Eliza Jane Pratt (D)	May 25, 1946
Virginia 5th	Thomas G. Burch (D)	Resigned May 31, 1946, after being appointed to the U.S. Senate	Thomas B. Stanley (D)	November 5, 1946
Texas 6th	Luther A. Johnson (D)	Resigned July 17, 1946, after becoming judge of the United States Tax Court	Olin E. Teague (D)	August 24, 1946
Pennsylvania 10th	John W. Murphy (D)	Resigned July 17, 1946, to become judge of the US District Court for the Middle District of Pennsylvania	James P. Scoblick (R)	November 5, 1946
Minnesota 3rd	William Gallagher (DFL)	Died August 13, 1946	Vacant	Not filled this term
Puerto Rico at-large	Jesús T. Piñero (PPD)	Resigned September 2, 1946, after being appointed Governor of Puerto Rico	Antonio Fernós-Isern (PPD)	September 11, 1946
New York 4th	William B. Barry (D)	Died October 20, 1946	Vacant	Not filled this term
Alabama 8th	John Sparkman (D)	Resigned November 6, 1946, after being elected to the U.S. Senate	Vacant	Not filled this term
Idaho 2nd	Henry Dworshak (R)	Resigned November 5, 1946, after being elected to the U.S. Senate	Vacant	Not filled this term
Virginia 7th	Absalom W. Robertson (D)	Resigned November 5, 1946, after being elected to the U.S. Senate	Burr Harrison (D)	November 5, 1946
Wisconsin 2nd	Robert K. Henry (R)	Died November 20, 1946	Vacant	Not filled this term

== Committees ==
Lists of committees and their party leaders for members of the House and Senate committees can be found through the Official Congressional Directory at the bottom of this article. The directory after the pages of terms of service lists committees of the Senate, House (Standing with Subcommittees, Select and Special) and Joint and, after that, House/Senate committee assignments. On the committees section of the House and Senate in the Official Congressional Directory, the committee's members on the first row on the left side shows the chairman of the committee and on the right side shows the ranking member of the committee.

=== Senate ===
- Agriculture and Forestry (Chairman: Elmer Thomas; Ranking Member: Arthur Capper)
- Appropriations (Chairman: Kenneth McKellar; Ranking Member: Styles Bridges)
- Atomic Energy (Select)
- Audit and Control the Contingent Expenses of the Senate (Chairman: Scott W. Lucas; Ranking Member: Charles W. Tobey)
- Banking and Currency (Chairman: Robert F. Wagner; Ranking Member: Charles W. Tobey)
- Campaign Expenditures Investigation, 1944 (Special) (Chairman: Theodore F. Green)
- Campaign Expenditures Investigation, 1946 (Special) (Chairman: Allen J. Ellender)
- Civil Service (Chairman: Sheridan Downey; Ranking Member: William Langer)
- Civil Service Laws (Special)
- Claims (Chairman: Allen J. Ellender; Ranking Member: Arthur Capper)
- Commerce (Chairman: Josiah W. Bailey; Ranking Member: Hiram W. Johnson then Arthur H. Vandenberg)
- District of Columbia (Chairman: Theodore G. Bilbo; Ranking Member: Arthur Capper)
- Education and Labor (Chairman: James E. Murray; Ranking Member: Robert M. La Follette Jr.)
- Enrolled Bills (Chairman: N/A; Ranking Member: Clyde M. Reed)
- Expenditures in Executive Departments (Chairman: J. Lister Hill; Ranking Member: George D. Aiken)
- Finance (Chairman: Walter F. George; Ranking Member: Robert M. La Follette Jr.)
- Foreign Relations (Chairman: Tom Connally; Ranking Member: Hiram W. Johnson then Arthur Capper)
- Immigration (Chairman: Richard B. Russell; Ranking Member: Hiram W. Johnson then Chan Gurney)
- Indian Affairs (Chairman: Joseph C. O'Mahoney; Ranking Member: Robert M. La Follette Jr.)
- Interoceanic Canals (Chairman: Tom Stewart; Ranking Member: Harlan J. Bushfield)
- Interstate Commerce (Chairman: Burton K. Wheeler; Ranking Member: Wallace H. White Jr.)
- Investigate the National Defense Program (Special)
- Irrigation and Reclamation (Chairman: John H. Overton; Ranking Member: Hiram W. Johnson)
- Judiciary (Chairman: Pat McCarran; Ranking Member: Alexander Wiley)
- Library (Chairman: Alben W. Barkley; Ranking Member: Owen Brewster)
- Manufactures (Chairman: John H. Overton; Ranking Member: Robert M. La Follette Jr.)
- Military Affairs (Chairman: Elbert D. Thomas; Ranking Member: Warren R. Austin)
- Mines and Mining (Chairman: Joseph F. Guffey; Ranking Member: Clyde M. Reed)
- Naval Affairs (Chairman: David I. Walsh; Ranking Member: Hiram W. Johnson then Charles W. Tobey)
- Organization of Congress (Select)
- Patents (Chairman: Claude Pepper; Ranking Member: Wallace H. White Jr.)
- Pensions (Chairman: James M. Tunnell; Ranking Member: Henrik Shipstead)
- Petroleum Resources (Special)
- Post Office and Post Roads (Chairman: Dennis Chavez; Ranking Member: Clyde M. Reed)
- Post-War Economic Policy and Planning (Special)
- Printing (Chairman: Carl Hayden; Ranking Member: Raymond E. Willis)
- Privileges and Elections (Chairman: Theodore F. Green; Ranking Member: Styles Bridges)
- Public Buildings and Grounds (Chairman: Charles O. Andrews; Ranking Member: Robert A. Taft)
- Public Lands and Surveys (Chairman: Carl A. Hatch; Ranking Member: Chan Gurney)
- Remodeling the Senate Chamber (Special)
- Rules (Chairman: Harry F. Byrd; Ranking Member: Arthur H. Vandenberg)
- Small Business Enterprises (Special) (Chairman: James E. Murray)
- Territories and Insular Affairs (Chairman: Millard E. Tydings; Ranking Member: Arthur H. Vandenberg)
- Whole
- Wildlife Resources (Special)
- Wool Production (Special) (Chairman: Joseph C. O'Mahoney)

=== House of Representatives ===
- Accounts (Chairman: John J. Cochran; Ranking Member: Leo E. Allen)
- Agriculture (Chairman: John W. Flannagan Jr.; Ranking Member: Clifford R. Hope)
- Appropriations (Chairman: Clarence Cannon; Ranking Member: John Taber)
- Banking and Currency (Chairman: Brent Spence; Ranking Member: Jesse P. Wolcott)
- Census (Chairman: A. Leonard Allen; Ranking Member: J. Roland Kinzer)
- Civil Service (Chairman: Jennings Randolph; Ranking Member: Edward H. Rees)
- Claims (Chairman: Dan R. McGehee; Ranking Member: J. Parnell Thomas)
- Coinage, Weights and Measures (Chairman: Compton I. White; Ranking Member: Chauncey W. Reed)
- Conservation of Wildlife Resources (Select) (Chairman: A. Willis Robertson)
- Disposition of Executive Papers (Chairman: Alfred J. Elliott; Ranking Member: Bertrand W. Gearhart)
- District of Columbia (Chairman: John L. McMillan; Ranking Member: Everett M. Dirksen)
- Education (Chairman: Graham A. Barden; Ranking Member: George A. Dondero)
- Election of the President, Vice President and Representatives in Congress (Chairman: Herbert C. Bonner; Ranking Member: Ralph A. Gamble)
- Elections No.#1 (Chairman: James Domengeaux; Ranking Member: Clarence E. Hancock)
- Elections No.#2 (Chairman: Ed Gossett; Ranking Member: Gerald W. Landis)
- Elections No.#3 (Chairman: O.C. Fisher; Ranking Member: Charles A. Plumley)
- Enrolled Bills (Chairman: George F. Rogers; Ranking Member: B. Carroll Reece)
- Expenditures in the Executive Departments (Chairman: Carter Manasco; Ranking Member: Clare E. Hoffman)
- Flood Control (Chairman: William M. Whittington; Ranking Member: Charles R. Clason)
- Foreign Affairs (Chairman: Sol Bloom; Ranking Member: Charles Aubrey Eaton)
- Immigration and Naturalization (Chairman: John Lesinski; Ranking Member: Noah M. Mason)
- Indian Affairs (Chairman: Henry M. Jackson; Ranking Member: Karl E. Mundt)
- Insular Affairs (Chairman: C. Jasper Bell; Ranking Member: Richard J. Welch)
- Interstate and Foreign Commerce (Chairman: Clarence F. Lea; Ranking Member: Charles A. Wolverton)
- Invalid Pensions (Chairman: Augustine B. Kelley; Ranking Member: J. Harry McGregor)
- Investigate Acts of Executive Agencies Beyond their Scope of Authority (Select) (Chairman: Howard W. Smith)
- Irrigation and Reclamation (Chairman: John R. Murdock; Ranking Member: Dewey Jackson Short)
- Judiciary (Chairman: Hatton W. Sumners; Ranking Member: Clarence E. Hancock)
- Labor (Chairman: Mary Teresa Norton; Ranking Member: Richard J. Welch)
- Library (Chairman: Donald L. O'Toole; Ranking Member: C.W. Bishop)
- Memorials (Chairman: Antonio M. Fernandez; Ranking Member: James Heidinger then Roy Clippinger)
- Merchant Marine and Fisheries (Chairman: S. Otis Bland; Ranking Member: Richard J. Welch)
- Military Affairs (Chairman: Andrew J. May; Ranking Member: Walter G. Andrews)
- Mines and Mining (Chairman: Andrew Somers; Ranking Member: John M. Robsion)
- Naval Affairs (Chairman: Carl Vinson; Ranking Member: James W. Mott)
- Patents (Chairman: Frank Carlson; Ranking Member: Fred A. Hartley)
- Pensions (Chairman: Charles A. Buckley; Ranking Member: William H. Stevenson)
- Post Office and Post Roads (Chairman: George D. O'Brien; Ranking Member: Fred A. Hartley)
- Post-War Military Policy (Select) (Chairman: Clifton A. Woodrum)
- Post-War Economic Policy and Planning (Special) (Chairman: N/A)
- Printing (Chairman: Pete Jarman; Ranking Member: Robert F. Rich)
- Public Buildings and Grounds (Chairman: Fritz G. Lanham; Ranking Member: Pehr G. Holmes)
- Public Lands (Chairman: J. Hardin Peterson; Ranking Member: Karl M. LeCompte)
- Revision of Laws (Chairman: Eugene J. Keogh; Ranking Member: John M. Robsion)
- Rivers and Harbors (Chairman: Joseph J. Mansfield; Ranking Member: George A. Dondero)
- Roads (Chairman: J.W. Robinson; Ranking Member: Jesse P. Wolcott)
- Rules (Chairman: Adolph J. Sabath; Ranking Member: Leo E. Allen)
- Small Business (Select) (Chairman: Wright Patman)
- Standards of Official Conduct
- Disposition of Surplus Property (Select) (Chairman: Roger C. Slaughter)
- Territories (Chairman: Hugh Peterson; Ranking Member: Homer D. Angell)
- Un-American Activities (Chairman: John S. Wood; Ranking Member: J. Parnell Thomas)
- War Claims (Chairman: Clair Engle; Ranking Member: Clare E. Hoffman)
- Ways and Means (Chairman: Robert L. Doughton; Ranking Member: Harold Knutson)
- World War Veterans' Legislation (Chairman: John E. Rankin; Ranking Member: Harold Knutson)
- Whole

=== Joint committees ===
- Atomic Energy (Chairman: Sen. Brien McMahon)
- Arrange the Inauguration for President-elect (Chairman: Sen. Harry F. Byrd)
- Conditions of Indian Tribes (Special)
- Disposition of Executive Papers
- Investigation of the Pearl Harbor Attack
- Legislative Budget
- The Library (Chairman: Sen. Alben W. Barkley)
- Organization of Congress (Chairman: Vacant; Vice Chairman: Rep. Mike Monroney)
- Printing (Chairman: Sen. Carl Hayden; Vice Chairman: Rep. Pete Jarman)
- Reduction of Nonessential Federal Expenditures (Chairman: Sen. Harry F. Byrd; Vice Chairman: Rep. Robert L. Doughton)
- Selective Service Deferments
- Taxation (Chairman: Rep. Robert F. Doughton; Vice Chairman: Sen. Walter F. George)

== Caucuses ==
- Democratic (House)
- Democratic (Senate)

== Employees ==
=== Legislative branch agency directors ===
- Architect of the Capitol: David Lynn
- Attending Physician of the United States Congress: George Calver
- Comptroller General of the United States: Lindsay C. Warren
- Librarian of Congress: Luther H. Evans
- Public Printer of the United States: Augustus E. Giegengack

=== Senate ===
- Chaplain: Frederick Brown Harris (Methodist)
- Parliamentarian: Charles Watkins
- Secretary: Edwin A. Halsey, until January 29, 1945
  - Leslie Biffle, from February 8, 1945
- Librarian: Ruskin McArdle
- Secretary for the Majority: Leslie Biffle, until February 8, 1945
  - Felton McLellan Johnston, from October 1945
- Secretary for the Minority: Carl A. Loeffler
- Sergeant at Arms: Wall Doxey

=== House of Representatives ===
- Chaplain: James Shera Montgomery (Methodist)
- Clerk: South Trimble, until November 23, 1946
  - Harry Newlin Megill, from November 23, 1946
- Doorkeeper: Ralph R. Roberts
- Parliamentarian: Lewis Deschler
- Postmaster: Finis E. Scott
- Reading Clerks: George J. Maurer (D) and Alney E. Chaffee (R)
- Sergeant at Arms: Kenneth Romney

== See also ==
- 1944 United States elections (elections leading to this Congress)
  - 1944 United States presidential election
  - 1944 United States Senate elections
  - 1944 United States House of Representatives elections
- 1946 United States elections (elections during this Congress, leading to the next Congress)
  - 1946 United States Senate elections
  - 1946 United States House of Representatives elections
