= 78th United States Congress =

1943–1945 U.S. Congress

←	77th	79th	→
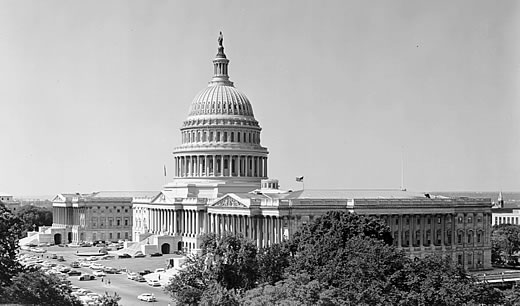
- United States Capitol (1956)

Overview
- Legislative body: United States Congress
- Jurisdiction: United States
- Term: January 3, 1943 – January 3, 1945

Senate
- Members: 96
- President: Henry A. Wallace (D)
- President pro tempore: Carter Glass (D)
- Party control: Democratic

House of Representatives
- Members: 435 representatives 4 non-voting delegates
- Speaker: Sam Rayburn (D)
- Party control: Democratic

Sessions
- 1st: January 6, 1943 – December 21, 1943
- 2nd: January 10, 1944 – December 19, 1944

The 78th United States Congress was a meeting of the legislative branch of the United States federal government, composed of the United States Senate and the United States House of Representatives. It met in Washington, D.C., from January 3, 1943, to January 3, 1945, during the last two years of Franklin D. Roosevelt's presidency. The apportionment of seats in the House of Representatives was based on the 1940 United States census.

Both chambers had a Democratic majority - albeit greatly reduced from the 77th Congress, with the Democrats losing their supermajority in the House and Senate. Along with President Franklin D. Roosevelt, the Democrats maintained an overall federal government trifecta.

== Major events ==
- World War II continued (1941–1945)
- June 6, 1944: Battle of Normandy
- November 7, 1944: General elections:
  - President Roosevelt was re-elected to a fourth term.
  - Senate Democrats kept their majority despite 1-seat net loss.
  - House Democrats increased their majority with a 20-seat net gain.

== Major legislation ==
- December 17, 1943: Magnuson Act (Chinese Exclusion Repeal Act of 1943), Sess. 1, ch. 344, 57 Stat. 600
- February 3, 1944: Mustering-out Payment Act, Sess. 2, Pub. L. 78–225, 58 Stat. 8
- June 6, 1944: Servicemen's Readjustment Act of 1944 (G.I. Bill), Sess. 2, ch. 268, Pub. L. 78–345, 58 Stat. 284
- June 27, 1944: Veterans' Preference Act, Sess. 2, ch. 287, Pub. L. 78–359, 58 Stat. 387
- July 1, 1944: Public Health Service Act, Sess. 2, ch. 373, 58 Stat. 682
- Contract Settlement Act of 1944, Pub. L. 78–395, Sess. 2, an act to provide for the settlement of claims arising from terminated war contracts
- December 22, 1944: Pick-Sloan Flood Control Act, Sess. 2, ch. 665, Pub. L. 78–534, 58 Stat. 887

== Party summary ==
=== Senate ===
	Party (shading shows control)				Total	Vacant
	Democratic (D)	Wisconsin Progressive (WP)	Republican (R)	Other	Total	Vacant
End of previous congress	64	1	30	1	96	0
Begin	57	1	38	0	96	0
End	56	1	39	0	96	0
Final voting share	58.3%	1.0%	40.6%	0.0%		
Beginning of next congress	57	1	38	0	96	0

=== House of Representatives ===
	Party (shading shows control)					Total	Vacant
	Democratic (D)	Farmer– Labor (FL)	American Labor (AL)	Wisconsin Progressive (WP)	Republican (R)	Total	Vacant
End of previous congress	254	1	1	3	165	424	11
Begin	222	1	1	2	208	434	1
End	212	0	1	2	211	426	9
Final voting share	49.8%	0.0%	0.2%	0.5%	49.5%		
Beginning of next congress	242	0	1	1	190	434	1

== Leaders ==
Section contents: Senate: Majority (D), Minority (R) • House: Majority (D), Minority (R)

=== Senate ===
- President: Henry A. Wallace (D)
- President pro tempore: Carter Glass (D)

==== Majority (Democratic) leadership ====
- Majority Leader: Alben W. Barkley
- Majority Whip: J. Lister Hill
- Democratic Caucus Secretary: Francis T. Maloney

==== Minority (Republican) leadership ====
- Minority Leader: Charles L. McNary, until February 25, 1944
  - Wallace H. White Jr., after February 25, 1944
- Minority whip: No Republican whips were appointed from 1935 to 1944 since only 17 Republicans were in the Senate following the landslide reelection of President Franklin D. Roosevelt in 1936. Accordingly, the minutes of the Republican Conference for the period state: "On motion of Senator Hastings, duly seconded and carried, it was agreed that no Assistant Leader or Whip be elected but that the chairman be authorized to appoint Senators from time to time to assist him in taking charge of the interests of the minority." A note attached to the conference minutes added: "The chairman of the conference, Senator McNary, apparently appointed Senator Austin of Vermont as assistant leader in 1943 and 1944, until the conference adopted Rules of Organization."
- Republican Conference Secretary: Wallace H. White Jr., until February 25, 1944
  - Harold Hitz Burton (from February 25, 1944)
- National Senatorial Committee Chair: John G. Townsend Jr.

=== House of Representatives ===
- Speaker: Sam Rayburn (D)

==== Majority (Democratic) leadership ====
- Majority Leader: John W. McCormack
- Majority whip: Robert Ramspeck
- Democratic Caucus Chairman: Harry R. Sheppard
- Democratic Campaign Committee Chairman: Patrick H. Drewry

==== Minority (Republican) leadership ====
- Minority Leader: Joseph W. Martin Jr.
- Minority whip: Harry Lane Englebright, until May 13, 1943
  - Leslie C. Arends, from May 13, 1943
- Republican Conference Chairman: Roy O. Woodruff
- Republican Campaign Committee Chairman: Charles A. Halleck

== Members ==
=== Senate ===
Senators are popularly elected statewide every two years, with one-third beginning new six-year terms with each Congress. Preceding the names in the list below are Senate class numbers, which indicate the cycle of their election, In this Congress, Class 3 meant their term ended with this Congress, facing re-election in 1944; Class 1 meant their term began in the last Congress, facing re-election in 1946; and Class 2 meant their term began in this Congress, facing re-election in 1948.

==== Alabama ====
▌2. John H. Bankhead II (D)
▌3. J. Lister Hill (D)

==== Arizona ====
▌1. Ernest McFarland (D)
▌3. Carl Hayden (D)

==== Arkansas ====
▌2. John L. McClellan (D)
▌3. Hattie Caraway (D)

==== California ====
▌1. Hiram W. Johnson (R)
▌3. Sheridan Downey (D)

==== Colorado ====
▌2. Edwin C. Johnson (D)
▌3. Eugene Millikin (R)

==== Connecticut ====
▌1. Francis T. Maloney (D)
▌3. John A. Danaher (R)

==== Delaware ====
▌1. James M. Tunnell (D)
▌2. C. Douglass Buck (R)

==== Florida ====
▌1. Charles O. Andrews (D)
▌3. Claude Pepper (D)

==== Georgia ====
▌2. Richard Russell Jr. (D)
▌3. Walter F. George (D)

==== Idaho ====
▌2. John Thomas (R)
▌3. D. Worth Clark (D)

==== Illinois ====
▌2. Charles W. Brooks (R)
▌3. Scott W. Lucas (D)

==== Indiana ====
▌1. Raymond E. Willis (R)
▌3. Frederick Van Nuys (D), until January 25, 1944

▌Samuel D. Jackson (D), January 28, 1944 – November 13, 1944
▌William E. Jenner (R), from November 14, 1944

==== Iowa ====
▌2. George A. Wilson (R)
▌3. Guy M. Gillette (D)

==== Kansas ====
▌2. Arthur Capper (R)
▌3. Clyde M. Reed (R)

==== Kentucky ====
▌2. Happy Chandler (D)
▌3. Alben Barkley (D)

==== Louisiana ====
▌2. Allen J. Ellender (D)
▌3. John H. Overton (D)

==== Maine ====
▌1. Ralph Owen Brewster (R)
▌2. Wallace H. White Jr. (R)

==== Maryland ====
▌1. George L. P. Radcliffe (D)
▌3. Millard Tydings (D)

==== Massachusetts ====
▌1. David I. Walsh (D)
▌2. Henry Cabot Lodge Jr. (R), until February 3, 1944

▌Sinclair Weeks (R), February 8, 1944 – December 19, 1944
Vacant from December 19, 1944

==== Michigan ====
▌1. Arthur H. Vandenberg (R)
▌2. Homer S. Ferguson (R)

==== Minnesota ====
▌1. Henrik Shipstead (R)
▌2. Joseph H. Ball (R)

==== Mississippi ====
▌1. Theodore G. Bilbo (D)
▌2. James Eastland (D)

==== Missouri ====
▌1. Harry S. Truman (D)
▌3. Bennett Champ Clark (D)

==== Montana ====
▌1. Burton K. Wheeler (D)
▌2. James E. Murray (D)

==== Nebraska ====
▌1. Hugh A. Butler (R)
▌2. Kenneth S. Wherry (R)

==== Nevada ====
▌1. James G. Scrugham (D)
▌3. Patrick A. McCarran (D)

==== New Hampshire ====
▌2. Styles Bridges (R)
▌3. Charles W. Tobey (R)

==== New Jersey ====
▌1. William Warren Barbour (R), until November 22, 1943

▌Arthur Walsh (D), November 26, 1943 – December 7, 1944
▌Howard Alexander Smith (R), from December 7, 1944

▌2. Albert W. Hawkes (R)

==== New Mexico ====
▌1. Dennis Chávez (D)
▌2. Carl Hatch (D)

==== New York ====
▌1. James M. Mead (D)
▌3. Robert F. Wagner (D)

==== North Carolina ====
▌2. Josiah William Bailey (D)
▌3. Robert R. Reynolds (D)

==== North Dakota ====
▌1. William Langer (R-NPL)
▌3. Gerald Nye (R)

==== Ohio ====
▌1. Harold Hitz Burton (R)
▌3. Robert A. Taft (R)

==== Oklahoma ====
▌2. Edward H. Moore (R)
▌3. Elmer Thomas (D)

==== Oregon ====
▌2. Charles L. McNary (R), until February 25, 1944

▌Guy Cordon (R), from March 4, 1944

▌3. Rufus C. Holman (R)

==== Pennsylvania ====
▌1. Joseph F. Guffey (D)
▌3. James J. Davis (R)

==== Rhode Island ====
▌1. Peter G. Gerry (D)
▌2. Theodore F. Green (D)

==== South Carolina ====
▌2. Burnet R. Maybank (D)
▌3. Ellison D. Smith (D), until November 17, 1944

▌Wilton E. Hall (D), from November 20, 1944

==== South Dakota ====
▌2. Harlan J. Bushfield (R)
▌3. John Chandler Gurney (R)

==== Tennessee ====
▌1. Kenneth McKellar (D)
▌2. Tom Stewart (D)

==== Texas ====
▌1. Tom T. Connally (D)
▌2. W. Lee O'Daniel (D)

==== Utah ====
▌1. Abe Murdock (D)
▌3. Elbert D. Thomas (D)

==== Vermont ====
▌1. Warren Austin (R)
▌3. George Aiken (R)

==== Virginia ====
▌1. Harry F. Byrd (D)
▌2. Carter Glass (D)

==== Washington ====
▌1. Monrad Wallgren (D)
▌3. Homer Bone (D), until November 13, 1944

▌Warren G. Magnuson (D), from December 14, 1944

==== West Virginia ====
▌1. Harley M. Kilgore (D)
▌2. Chapman Revercomb (R)

==== Wisconsin ====
▌1. Robert M. La Follette Jr. (P)
▌3. Alexander Wiley (R)

==== Wyoming ====
▌1. Joseph C. O'Mahoney (D)
▌2. Edward V. Robertson (R)

Senators' party membership by state at the opening of the 78th Congress in January 1943. The green stripes denote Senator Robert M. La Follette Jr. of the Progressive Party. 2 Democrats 1 Democrat and 1 Republican 2 Republicans

=== House of Representatives ===
The names of representatives are preceded by their district numbers.

==== Alabama ====
▌1. Frank W. Boykin (D)
▌2. George M. Grant (D)
▌3. Henry B. Steagall (D), until November 22, 1943

▌George W. Andrews (D), from March 14, 1944

▌4. Sam Hobbs (D)
▌5. Joe Starnes (D)
▌6. Pete Jarman (D)
▌7. Carter Manasco (D)
▌8. John J. Sparkman (D)
▌9. John P. Newsome (D)

==== Arizona ====
▌At-large. John R. Murdock (D)
▌At-large. Richard F. Harless (D)

==== Arkansas ====
▌1. Ezekiel C. Gathings (D)
▌2. Wilbur Mills (D)
▌3. J. William Fulbright (D)
▌4. William Fadjo Cravens (D)
▌5. Brooks Hays (D)
▌6. William F. Norrell (D)
▌7. Oren Harris (D)

==== California ====
▌1. Clarence F. Lea (D)
▌2. Harry L. Englebright (R), until May 13, 1943

▌Clair Engle (D), from August 31, 1943

▌3. J. Leroy Johnson (R)
▌4. Thomas Rolph (R)
▌5. Richard J. Welch (R)
▌6. Albert E. Carter (R)
▌7. John H. Tolan (D)
▌8. Jack Z. Anderson (R)
▌9. Bertrand W. Gearhart (R)
▌10. Alfred J. Elliott (D)
▌11. George E. Outland (D)
▌12. Jerry Voorhis (D)
▌13. Norris Poulson (R)
▌14. Thomas F. Ford (D)
▌15. John M. Costello (D)
▌16. Will Rogers Jr. (D), until May 23, 1944
▌17. Cecil R. King (D)
▌18. William Ward Johnson (R)
▌19. Chester E. Holifield (D)
▌20. John Carl Hinshaw (R)
▌21. Harry R. Sheppard (D)
▌22. John R. Phillips (R)
▌23. Edouard V. M. Izac (D)

==== Colorado ====
▌1. Lawrence Lewis (D), until December 9, 1943

▌Dean M. Gillespie (R), from March 7, 1944

▌2. William S. Hill (R)
▌3. John Chenoweth (R)
▌4. Robert F. Rockwell (R)

==== Connecticut ====
▌1. William J. Miller (R)
▌2. John D. McWilliams (R)
▌3. Ranulf Compton (R)
▌4. Clare Boothe Luce (R)
▌5. Joseph E. Talbot (R)
▌At-large. B. J. Monkiewicz (R)

==== Delaware ====
▌At-large. Earle D. Willey (R)

==== Florida ====
▌1. J. Hardin Peterson (D)
▌2. Emory H. Price (D)
▌3. Robert L. F. Sikes (D), until October 19, 1944
▌4. Pat Cannon (D)
▌5. Joe Hendricks (D)
▌At-large. Robert A. Green (D), until November 25, 1944

==== Georgia ====
▌1. Hugh Peterson (D)
▌2. Edward E. Cox (D)
▌3. Stephen Pace (D)
▌4. Albert Sidney Camp (D)
▌5. Robert Ramspeck (D)
▌6. Carl Vinson (D)
▌7. Malcolm C. Tarver (D)
▌8. John S. Gibson (D)
▌9. B. Frank Whelchel (D)
▌10. Paul Brown (D)

==== Idaho ====
▌1. Compton I. White (D)
▌2. Henry Dworshak (R)

==== Illinois ====
▌1. William L. Dawson (D)
▌2. William A. Rowan (D)
▌3. Fred E. Busbey (R)
▌4. Martin Gorski (D)
▌5. Adolph J. Sabath (D)
▌6. Thomas J. O'Brien (D)
▌7. Leonard W. Schuetz (D), until February 13, 1944
▌8. Thomas S. Gordon (D)
▌9. Charles S. Dewey (R)
▌10. Ralph E. Church (R)
▌11. Chauncey W. Reed (R)
▌12. Noah M. Mason (R)
▌13. Leo E. Allen (R)
▌14. Anton J. Johnson (R)
▌15. Robert B. Chiperfield (R)
▌16. Everett M. Dirksen (R)
▌17. Leslie C. Arends (R)
▌18. Jessie Sumner (R)
▌19. William H. Wheat (R), until January 16, 1944

▌Rolla C. McMillen (R), from June 13, 1944

▌20. Sid Simpson (R)
▌21. George Evan Howell (R)
▌22. Calvin D. Johnson (R)
▌23. Charles W. Vursell (R)
▌24. James V. Heidinger (R)
▌25. C. W. Bishop (R)
▌At-large. Stephen A. Day (R)

==== Indiana ====
▌1. Ray Madden (D)
▌2. Charles A. Halleck (R)
▌3. Robert A. Grant (R)
▌4. George W. Gillie (R)
▌5. Forest Harness (R)
▌6. Noble J. Johnson (R)
▌7. Gerald W. Landis (R)
▌8. Charles M. La Follette (R)
▌9. Earl Wilson (R)
▌10. Raymond S. Springer (R)
▌11. Louis Ludlow (D)

==== Iowa ====
▌1. Thomas E. Martin (R)
▌2. Henry O. Talle (R)
▌3. John W. Gwynne (R)
▌4. Karl M. LeCompte (R)
▌5. Paul H. Cunningham (R)
▌6. Fred C. Gilchrist (R)
▌7. Ben F. Jensen (R)
▌8. Charles B. Hoeven (R)

==== Kansas ====
▌1. William P. Lambertson (R)
▌2. Ulysses S. Guyer (R), until June 5, 1943

▌Errett P. Scrivner (R), from September 14, 1943

▌3. Thomas Daniel Winter (R)
▌4. Edward Herbert Rees (R)
▌5. Clifford R. Hope (R)
▌6. Frank Carlson (R)

==== Kentucky ====
▌1. Noble J. Gregory (D)
▌2. Beverly M. Vincent (D)
▌3. Emmet O'Neal (D)
▌4. Edward W. Creal (D), until October 13, 1943

▌Chester O. Carrier (R), from November 30, 1943

▌5. Brent Spence (D)
▌6. Virgil Chapman (D)
▌7. Andrew J. May (D)
▌8. Joe B. Bates (D)
▌9. John M. Robsion (R)

==== Louisiana ====
▌1. F. Edward Hébert (D)
▌2. Paul H. Maloney (D)
▌3. James R. Domengeaux (D), until April 15, 1944

▌3. James R. Domengeaux (D), from November 7, 1944

▌4. Overton Brooks (D)
▌5. Charles E. McKenzie (D)
▌6. James H. Morrison (D)
▌7. Henry D. Larcade Jr. (D)
▌8. A. Leonard Allen (D)

==== Maine ====
▌1. Robert Hale (R)
▌2. Margaret Chase Smith (R)
▌3. Frank Fellows (R)

==== Maryland ====
▌1. David Jenkins Ward (D)
▌2. Harry Streett Baldwin (D)
▌3. Thomas D'Alesandro Jr. (D)
▌4. Daniel Ellison (R)
▌5. Lansdale G. Sasscer (D)
▌6. James Glenn Beall (R)

==== Massachusetts ====
▌1. Allen T. Treadway (R)
▌2. Charles Clason (R)
▌3. Philip J. Philbin (D)
▌4. Pehr G. Holmes (R)
▌5. Edith Nourse Rogers (R)
▌6. George J. Bates (R)
▌7. Thomas J. Lane (D)
▌8. Angier Goodwin (R)
▌9. Charles L. Gifford (R)
▌10. Christian Herter (R)
▌11. James Michael Curley (D)
▌12. John W. McCormack (D)
▌13. Richard B. Wigglesworth (R)
▌14. Joseph W. Martin Jr. (R)

==== Michigan ====
▌1. George G. Sadowski (D)
▌2. Earl C. Michener (R)
▌3. Paul W. Shafer (R)
▌4. Clare E. Hoffman (R)
▌5. Bartel J. Jonkman (R)
▌6. William W. Blackney (R)
▌7. Jesse P. Wolcott (R)
▌8. Fred L. Crawford (R)
▌9. Albert J. Engel (R)
▌10. Roy O. Woodruff (R)
▌11. Fred Bradley (R)
▌12. John B. Bennett (R)
▌13. George D. O'Brien (D)
▌14. Louis C. Rabaut (D)
▌15. John D. Dingell Sr. (D)
▌16. John Lesinski Sr. (D)
▌17. George A. Dondero (R)

==== Minnesota ====
▌1. August H. Andresen (R)
▌2. Joseph P. O'Hara (R)
▌3. Richard Pillsbury Gale (R)
▌4. Melvin Maas (R)
▌5. Walter Judd (R)
▌6. Harold Knutson (R)
▌7. Herman Carl Andersen (R)
▌8. William Pittenger (R)
▌▌9. Harold Hagen (FL), changed to (R) on April 15, 1944

==== Mississippi ====
▌1. John E. Rankin (D)
▌2. Jamie L. Whitten (D)
▌3. William M. Whittington (D)
▌4. Thomas Abernethy (D)
▌5. W. Arthur Winstead (D)
▌6. William M. Colmer (D)
▌7. Dan R. McGehee (D)

==== Missouri ====
▌1. Samuel W. Arnold (R)
▌2. Max Schwabe (R)
▌3. William Clay Cole (R)
▌4. C. Jasper Bell (D)
▌5. Roger C. Slaughter (D)
▌6. Marion T. Bennett (R), from January 12, 1943
▌7. Dewey Short (R)
▌8. William P. Elmer (R)
▌9. Clarence Cannon (D)
▌10. Orville Zimmerman (D)
▌11. Louis E. Miller (R)
▌12. Walter C. Ploeser (R)
▌13. John J. Cochran (D)

==== Montana ====
▌1. Mike Mansfield (D)
▌2. James F. O'Connor (D)

==== Nebraska ====
▌1. Carl Curtis (R)
▌2. Howard Buffett (R)
▌3. Karl Stefan (R)
▌4. Arthur L. Miller (R)

==== Nevada ====
▌At-large. Maurice J. Sullivan (D)

==== New Hampshire ====
▌1. Chester Earl Merrow (R)
▌2. Foster Waterman Stearns (R)

==== New Jersey ====
▌1. Charles A. Wolverton (R)
▌2. Elmer H. Wene (D)
▌3. James C. Auchincloss (R)
▌4. D. Lane Powers (R)
▌5. Charles A. Eaton (R)
▌6. Donald H. McLean (R)
▌7. J. Parnell Thomas (R)
▌8. Gordon Canfield (R)
▌9. Harry L. Towe (R)
▌10. Fred A. Hartley Jr. (R)
▌11. Frank Sundstrom (R)
▌12. Robert Kean (R)
▌13. Mary T. Norton (D)
▌14. Edward J. Hart (D)

==== New Mexico ====
▌At-large. Clinton P. Anderson (D)
▌At-large. Antonio M. Fernández (D)

==== New York ====
▌1. Leonard W. Hall (R)
▌2. William B. Barry (D)
▌3. Joseph L. Pfeifer (D)
▌4. Thomas H. Cullen (D), until March 1, 1944

▌John J. Rooney (D), from June 6, 1944

▌5. James J. Heffernan (D)
▌6. Andrew L. Somers (D)
▌7. John J. Delaney (D)
▌8. Donald L. O'Toole (D)
▌9. Eugene J. Keogh (D)
▌10. Emanuel Celler (D)
▌11. James A. O'Leary (D), until March 16, 1944

▌Ellsworth B. Buck (R), from June 6, 1944

▌12. Samuel Dickstein (D)
▌13. Louis Capozzoli (D)
▌14. Arthur George Klein (D)
▌15. Thomas F. Burchill (D)
▌16. James H. Fay (D)
▌17. Joseph C. Baldwin (R)
▌18. Martin J. Kennedy (D)
▌19. Sol Bloom (D)
▌20. Vito Marcantonio (AL)
▌21. Joseph A. Gavagan (D), until December 30, 1943

▌James H. Torrens (D), from February 29, 1944

▌22. Walter A. Lynch (D)
▌23. Charles A. Buckley (D)
▌24. James M. Fitzpatrick (D)
▌25. Ralph A. Gamble (R)
▌26. Hamilton Fish III (R)
▌27. Jay Le Fevre (R)
▌28. William T. Byrne (D)
▌29. Dean P. Taylor (R)
▌30. Bernard W. Kearney (R)
▌31. Clarence E. Kilburn (R)
▌32. Francis D. Culkin (R), until August 4, 1943

▌Hadwen C. Fuller (R), from November 2, 1943

▌33. Fred J. Douglas (R)
▌34. Edwin Arthur Hall (R)
▌35. Clarence E. Hancock (R)
▌36. John Taber (R)
▌37. W. Sterling Cole (R)
▌38. Joseph J. O'Brien (R)
▌39. James W. Wadsworth Jr. (R)
▌40. Walter G. Andrews (R)
▌41. Joseph Mruk (R)
▌42. John Cornelius Butler (R)
▌43. Daniel A. Reed (R)
▌At-large. Matthew J. Merritt (D)
▌At-large. Winifred C. Stanley (R)

==== North Carolina ====
▌1. Herbert Covington Bonner (D)
▌2. John H. Kerr (D)
▌3. Graham A. Barden (D)
▌4. Harold D. Cooley (D)
▌5. John Hamlin Folger (D)
▌6. Carl T. Durham (D)
▌7. J. Bayard Clark (D)
▌8. William O. Burgin (D)
▌9. Robert L. Doughton (D)
▌10. Cameron A. Morrison (D)
▌11. Alfred L. Bulwinkle (D)
▌12. Zebulon Weaver (D)

==== North Dakota ====
▌At-large. William Lemke (R-NPL)
▌At-large. Usher L. Burdick (R-NPL)

==== Ohio ====
▌1. Charles H. Elston (R)
▌2. William E. Hess (R)
▌3. Harry P. Jeffrey (R)
▌4. Robert Franklin Jones (R)
▌5. Cliff Clevenger (R)
▌6. Edward O. McCowen (R)
▌7. Clarence J. Brown (R)
▌8. Frederick Cleveland Smith (R)
▌9. Homer A. Ramey (R)
▌10. Thomas A. Jenkins (R)
▌11. Walter E. Brehm (R)
▌12. John M. Vorys (R)
▌13. Alvin F. Weichel (R)
▌14. Edmund Rowe (R)
▌15. Percy W. Griffiths (R)
▌16. Henderson H. Carson (R)
▌17. J. Harry McGregor (R)
▌18. Earl R. Lewis (R)
▌19. Michael J. Kirwan (D)
▌20. Michael A. Feighan (D)
▌21. Robert Crosser (D)
▌22. Frances P. Bolton (R)
▌At-large. George H. Bender (R)

==== Oklahoma ====
▌1. Wesley E. Disney (D)
▌2. John Conover Nichols (D), until July 3, 1943

▌William G. Stigler (D), from March 28, 1944

▌3. Paul Stewart (D)
▌4. Lyle Boren (D)
▌5. A. S. Mike Monroney (D)
▌6. Jed J. Johnson (D)
▌7. Victor Wickersham (D)
▌8. Ross Rizley (R)

==== Oregon ====
▌1. James W. Mott (R)
▌2. Lowell Stockman (R)
▌3. Homer D. Angell (R)
▌4. Harris Ellsworth (R)

==== Pennsylvania ====
▌1. James A. Gallagher (R)
▌2. James P. McGranery (D), until November 17, 1943

▌Joseph Marmaduke Pratt (R), from January 18, 1944

▌3. Michael J. Bradley (D)
▌4. John E. Sheridan (D)
▌5. C. Frederick Pracht (R)
▌6. Francis J. Myers (D)
▌7. Hugh Scott (R)
▌8. James Wolfenden (R)
▌9. Charles L. Gerlach (R)
▌10. J. Roland Kinzer (R)
▌11. John W. Murphy (D)
▌12. Thomas B. Miller (R)
▌13. Ivor D. Fenton (R)
▌14. Daniel K. Hoch (D)
▌15. Wilson D. Gillette (R)
▌16. Thomas E. Scanlon (D)
▌17. J. William Ditter (R), until November 21, 1943

▌Samuel K. McConnell Jr. (R), from January 18, 1944

▌18. Richard M. Simpson (R)
▌19. John C. Kunkel (R)
▌20. Leon H. Gavin (R)
▌21. Francis E. Walter (D)
▌22. Chester H. Gross (R)
▌23. James E. Van Zandt (R), until September 24, 1943

▌D. Emmert Brumbaugh (R), from November 2, 1943

▌24. J. Buell Snyder (D)
▌25. Grant Furlong (D)
▌26. Louis E. Graham (R)
▌27. Harve Tibbott (R)
▌28. Augustine B. Kelley (D)
▌29. Robert L. Rodgers (R)
▌30. Samuel A. Weiss (D)
▌31. Herman P. Eberharter (D)
▌32. James A. Wright (D)
▌At-large. William I. Troutman (R), until January 2, 1945

==== Rhode Island ====
▌1. Aime Forand (D)
▌2. John E. Fogarty (D), until December 7, 1944

==== South Carolina ====
▌1. L. Mendel Rivers (D)
▌2. Hampton P. Fulmer (D), until October 19, 1944

▌Willa L. Fulmer (D), from November 7, 1944

▌3. Butler B. Hare (D)
▌4. Joseph R. Bryson (D)
▌5. James P. Richards (D)
▌6. John L. McMillan (D)

==== South Dakota ====
▌1. Karl E. Mundt (R)
▌2. Francis Case (R)

==== Tennessee ====
▌1. B. Carroll Reece (R)
▌2. John Jennings Jr. (R)
▌3. Estes Kefauver (D)
▌4. Albert Gore Sr. (D), until December 4, 1944
▌5. Jim Nance McCord (D)
▌6. Percy Priest (D)
▌7. W. Wirt Courtney (D)
▌8. Tom J. Murray (D)
▌9. Jere Cooper (D)
▌10. Clifford Davis (D)

==== Texas ====
▌1. Wright Patman (D)
▌2. Martin Dies Jr. (D)
▌3. Lindley Beckworth (D)
▌4. Sam Rayburn (D)
▌5. Hatton W. Sumners (D)
▌6. Luther Alexander Johnson (D)
▌7. Nat Patton (D)
▌8. Albert Thomas (D)
▌9. Joseph J. Mansfield (D)
▌10. Lyndon B. Johnson (D)
▌11. William R. Poage (D)
▌12. Fritz G. Lanham (D)
▌13. Ed Gossett (D)
▌14. Richard M. Kleberg (D)
▌15. Milton H. West (D)
▌16. R. Ewing Thomason (D)
▌17. Sam M. Russell (D)
▌18. Eugene Worley (D)
▌19. George H. Mahon (D)
▌20. Paul J. Kilday (D)
▌21. O. C. Fisher (D)

==== Utah ====
▌1. Walter K. Granger (D)
▌2. J. W. Robinson (D)

==== Vermont ====
▌At-large. Charles A. Plumley (R)

==== Virginia ====
▌1. S. Otis Bland (D)
▌2. Winder R. Harris (D), until September 15, 1944

▌Ralph Hunter Daughton (D), from November 7, 1944

▌3. Dave E. Satterfield Jr. (D)
▌4. Patrick H. Drewry (D)
▌5. Thomas G. Burch (D)
▌6. Clifton A. Woodrum (D)
▌7. A. Willis Robertson (D)
▌8. Howard W. Smith (D)
▌9. John W. Flannagan Jr. (D)

==== Washington ====
▌1. Warren G. Magnuson (D), until December 14, 1944
▌2. Henry M. Jackson (D)
▌3. Fred B. Norman (R)
▌4. Hal Holmes (R)
▌5. Walt Horan (R)
▌6. John M. Coffee (D)

==== West Virginia ====
▌1. A. C. Schiffler (R)
▌2. Jennings Randolph (D)
▌3. Edward G. Rohrbough (R)
▌4. Hubert S. Ellis (R)
▌5. John Kee (D)
▌6. Joe L. Smith (D)

==== Wisconsin ====
▌1. Lawrence H. Smith (R)
▌2. Harry Sauthoff (P)
▌3. William H. Stevenson (R)
▌4. Thad F. Wasielewski (D)
▌5. Howard J. McMurray (D)
▌6. Frank Bateman Keefe (R)
▌7. Reid F. Murray (R)
▌8. LaVern Dilweg (D)
▌9. Merlin Hull (P)
▌10. Alvin O'Konski (R)

==== Wyoming ====
▌At-large. Frank A. Barrett (R)

==== Non-voting members ====
▌Alaska Territory. Anthony Dimond (D)
▌Hawaii Territory. Joseph Rider Farrington (R)
▌Philippines. Joaquín Miguel Elizalde (I), until August 9, 1944

▌Carlos P. Romulo (Lib.), from August 10, 1944

▌Puerto Rico. Bolívar Pagán (Socialist)

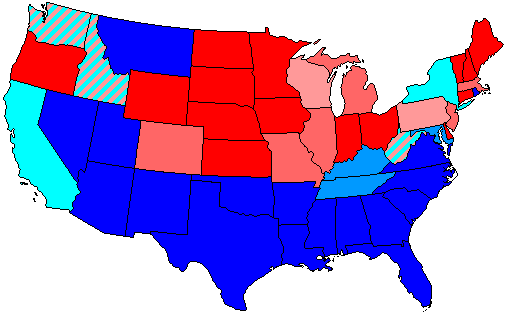
House seats by party holding plurality in state: 80+% Democratic / 80+% Republican; 60+% to 80% Democratic / 60+% to 80% Republican; Up to 60% Democratic / Up to 60% Republican

== Changes in membership ==
=== Senate ===
Senate changes
State (class)	Vacated by	Reason for change	Successor	Date of successor's formal installation (Note: When seated or oath administered, not necessarily when service began.)
New Jersey (1)	William Warren Barbour (R)	Died November 22, 1943. Successor was appointed until an election.	Arthur Walsh (D)	November 26, 1943
Indiana (3)	Frederick Van Nuys (D)	Died January 25, 1944. Successor was appointed until an election.	Samuel D. Jackson (D)	January 28, 1944
Massachusetts (2)	Henry Cabot Lodge Jr. (R)	Resigned February 3, 1944, to go on active duty in the US Army. Successor was appointed until a special election.	Sinclair Weeks (R)	February 8, 1944
Oregon (2)	Charles L. McNary (R)	Died February 25, 1944. Successor was appointed and subsequently won special election	Guy Cordon (R)	March 4, 1944
Washington (3)	Homer Bone (D)	Resigned November 13, 1944, to become Judge of the U.S. Court of Appeals for the 9th Circuit. Successor was appointed to finish the term, having just been elected to the next term.	Warren Magnuson (D)	December 14, 1944
Indiana (3)	Samuel D. Jackson (D)	Appointee was not a candidate to finish the term. Successor was elected.	William E. Jenner (R)	November 7, 1944
South Carolina (3)	Ellison D. Smith (D)	Died November 17, 1944.	Wilton E. Hall (D)	November 20, 1944
New Jersey (1)	Arthur Walsh (D)	Appointee was not a candidate to finish the term. Successor was elected.	Howard Alexander Smith (R)	December 7, 1944
Massachusetts (2)	Sinclair Weeks (R)	Appointee was not a candidate to finish the term. Successor was elected. Successor chose not to take the seat until the next Congress, but was nevertheless duly elected and qualified.	Leverett Saltonstall (R)	January 4, 1945

=== House of Representatives ===
House changes
District	Vacated by	Reason for change	Successor	Date of successor's formal installation
Missouri 6th	Vacant	Rep. Philip A. Bennett died in previous Congress	Marion T. Bennett (R)	January 12, 1943
California 2nd	Harry L. Englebright (R)	Died May 13, 1943	Clair Engle (D)	August 31, 1943
Kansas 2nd	Ulysses S. Guyer (R)	Died June 5, 1943	Errett P. Scrivner (R)	September 14, 1943
Oklahoma 2nd	John C. Nichols (D)	Resigned July 3, 1943, to become vice-president of Transcontinental and Western Air.	William G. Stigler (D)	March 28, 1944
New York 32nd	Francis D. Culkin (R)	Died August 4, 1943	Hadwen C. Fuller (R)	November 2, 1943
Pennsylvania 23rd	James E. Van Zandt (R)	Resigned September 24, 1943, after being called to active duty in the US Armed Forces.	D. Emmert Brumbaugh (R)	November 2, 1943
Kentucky 4th	Edward W. Creal (D)	Died October 13, 1943	Chester O. Carrier (R)	November 30, 1943
Pennsylvania 2nd	James P. McGranery (D)	Resigned November 17, 1943, after being appointed an Assistant Attorney General	Joseph Marmaduke Pratt (R)	January 18, 1944
Pennsylvania 17th	J. William Ditter (R)	Died November 21, 1943	Samuel K. McConnell Jr. (R)	January 18, 1944
Alabama 3rd	Henry B. Steagall (D)	Died November 22, 1943	George W. Andrews (D)	March 14, 1944
Colorado 1st	Lawrence Lewis (D)	Died December 9, 1943	Dean M. Gillespie (R)	March 7, 1944
New York 21st	Joseph A. Gavagan (D)	Resigned December 30, 1943, after being elected a justice of the New York Supreme Court	James H. Torrens (D)	February 29, 1944
Illinois 19th	William H. Wheat (R)	Died January 16, 1944	Rolla C. McMillen (R)	June 13, 1944
Illinois 7th	Leonard W. Schuetz (D)	Died February 13, 1944	Vacant until the next Congress	
New York 4th	Thomas H. Cullen (D)	Died March 1, 1944	John J. Rooney (D)	June 6, 1944
New York 11th	James A. O'Leary (D)	Died March 16, 1944	Ellsworth B. Buck (R)	June 6, 1944
Louisiana 3rd	James Domengeaux (D)	Resigned April 15, 1944, to join US Armed Forces	James Domengeaux (D)	Re-elected to fill his own vacancy November 7, 1944
Minnesota 9th	Harold Hagen (FL)	Changed parties April 15, 1944, after Minnesota Farmer–Labor and Democratic parties merged to become the Minnesota Democratic–Farmer–Labor Party (DFL)	Harold Hagen (R)	April 15, 1944
California 16th	Will Rogers Jr. (D)	Resigned May 23, 1944, to enter the US Army	Vacant until the next Congress	
Philippines at-large	Joaquín Miguel Elizalde	Resigned August 9, 1944, to become a member of the war cabinet of President Manuel L. Quezon	Carlos P. Romulo	August 10, 1944
Virginia 2nd	Winder R. Harris (D)	Resigned September 15, 1944	Ralph Hunter Daughton (D)	November 7, 1944
Florida 3rd	Robert L. F. Sikes (D)	Resigned October 19, 1944, to enter the U.S. Army	Vacant until the next Congress	
South Carolina 2nd	Hampton P. Fulmer (D)	Died October 19, 1944	Willa L. Fulmer (D)	November 7, 1944
Florida at-large	Robert A. Green (D)	Resigned November 25, 1944, to enter the United States Navy	Vacant until the next Congress	
Tennessee 4th	Albert Gore Sr. (D)	Resigned December 4, 1944, to enter the United States Army	Vacant until the next Congress	
Rhode Island 2nd	John E. Fogarty (D)	Resigned December 7, 1944, to enter the United States Navy	Vacant until the next Congress	
Washington 1st	Warren Magnuson (D)	Resigned December 14, 1944, when appointed U.S. Senator	Vacant until the next Congress	
Pennsylvania at-large	William I. Troutman (R)	Resigned January 2, 1945	Vacant until the next Congress	

== Committees ==
Lists of committees and their party leaders for members of the House and Senate committees can be found through the Official Congressional Directory at the bottom of this article. The directory after the pages of terms of service lists committees of the Senate, House (Standing with Subcommittees, Select and Special) and Joint and, after that, House/Senate committee assignments. On the committees section of the House and Senate in the Official Congressional Directory, the committee's members on the first row on the left side shows the chairman of the committee and on the right side shows the ranking member of the committee.

=== Senate ===
- Agriculture and Forestry (Chairman: Ellison D. Smith; Ranking Member: Charles L. McNary then Arthur Capper)
- Appropriations (Chairman: Carter Glass; Ranking Member: Gerald P. Nye)
- Audit and Control the Contingent Expenses of the Senate (Chairman: Scott W. Lucas; Ranking Member: Charles W. Tobey)
- Banking and Currency (Chairman: Robert F. Wagner; Ranking Member: Charles W. Tobey)
- Campaign Expenditures Investigation, 1944 (Special) (Chairman: Theodore F. Green)
- Centralization of Heavy Industry in the United States (Select)
- Civil Service (Chairman: Sheridan Downey; Ranking Member: William Langer)
- Civil Service Laws (Special)
- Claims (Chairman: Allen J. Ellender; Ranking Member: Arthur Capper)
- Commerce (Chairman: Josiah W. Bailey; Ranking Member: Charles L. McNary)
- District of Columbia (Chairman: Pat McCarran; Ranking Member: Arthur Capper)
- Education and Labor (Chairman: Elbert D. Thomas; Ranking Member: Robert M. La Follette Jr.)
  - Wartime Health and Education
- Enrolled Bills (Chairman: Hattie W. Caraway; Ranking Member: Clyde M. Reed)
- Expenditures in Executive Departments (Chairman: J. Lister Hill; Ranking Member: James J. Davis)
- Finance (Chairman: Walter F. George; Ranking Member: Robert M. La Follette Jr.)
- Foreign Relations (Chairman: Tom Connally; Ranking Member: Hiram W. Johnson)
- Fuel Situation in the Middle West (Special)
- Gasoline and Fuel Oil Shortages (Special)
- Immigration (Chairman: Richard B. Russell; Ranking Member: Hiram W. Johnson)
- Indian Affairs (Chairman: Elmer Thomas; Ranking Member: Robert M. La Follette Jr.)
- Interoceanic Canals (Chairman: Bennett Champ Clark; Ranking Member: Henry Cabot Lodge Jr.)
- Interstate Commerce (Chairman: Burton K. Wheeler; Ranking Member: Wallace H. White Jr.)
- Irrigation and Reclamation (Chairman: John H. Bankhead II; Ranking Member: Charles L. McNary then Hiram W. Johnson)
- Investigate the National Defense Program (Special)
- Judiciary (Chairman: Pat McCarran; Ranking Member: Warren R. Austin)
- Library (Chairman: Alben W. Barkley; Ranking Member: Charles L. McNary then Owen Brewster)
- Manufactures (Chairman: John H. Overton; Ranking Member: Robert M. La Follette Jr.)
- Military Affairs (Chairman: Robert R. Reynolds; Ranking Member: Warren R. Austin)
- Mines and Mining (Chairman: Joseph F. Guffey; Ranking Member: James J. Davis)
- Naval Affairs (Chairman: David I. Walsh; Ranking Member: James J. Davis)
- Patents (Chairman: Homer T. Bone; Ranking Member: Wallace H. White)
- Pensions (Chairman: James M. Tunnell; Ranking Member: Henrik Shipstead)
- Petroleum Resources (Special)
- Post Office and Post Roads (Chairman: Kenneth McKellar; Ranking Member: James J. Davis)
- Post-War Economic Policy and Planning (Special) (Chairman: Walter F. George)
- Printing (Chairman: Carl Hayden; Ranking Member: William Langer)
- Privileges and Elections (Chairman: Theodore F. Green; Ranking Member: Warren R. Austin)
- Public Buildings and Grounds (Chairman: Francis Maloney; Ranking Member: W. Warren Barbour)
- Public Lands and Surveys (Chairman: Carl A. Hatch; Ranking Member: Gerald P. Nye)
- Rules (Chairman: Harry F. Byrd; Ranking Member: Arthur H. Vandenberg)
- Senatorial Campaign Expenditures (Special) (Chairman: Ernest W. McFarland)
- Small Business Enterprises (Special) (Chairman: James E. Murray)
- Territories and Insular Affairs (Chairman: Millard E. Tydings; Ranking Member: Gerald P. Nye)
- Whole
- Wildlife Resources (Special) (Chairman: Bennett Champ Clark)
- Wool Production (Special) (Chairman: Joseph C. O'Mahoney)

=== House of Representatives ===
- Accounts (Chairman: John J. Cochran; Ranking Member: James Wolfenden)
- Agriculture (Chairman: Hampton P. Fulmer; Ranking Member: Clifford R. Hope)
- Appropriations (Chairman: Clarence Cannon; Ranking Member: John Taber)
- Banking and Currency (Chairman: Brent Spence; Ranking Member: Jesse P. Wolcott)
- Census (Chairman: A. Leonard Allen; Ranking Member: J. Roland Kinzer)
- Civil Service (Chairman: Robert Ramspeck; Ranking Member: Edith Nourse Rogers)
- Claims (Chairman: Dan R. McGehee; Ranking Member: J. Parnell Thomas)
- Coinage, Weights and Measures (Chairman: Andrew Somers; Ranking Member: Chauncey W. Reed)
- Conservation of Wildlife Resources (Select) (Chairman: A. Willis Robertson)
- Disposition of Executive Papers (Chairman: Alfred J. Elliott; Ranking Member: Bertrand W. Gearhart)
- District of Columbia (Chairman: Jennings Randolph; Ranking Member: Everett M. Dirksen)
- Education (Chairman: Graham A. Barden; Ranking Member: George A. Dondero)
- Election of the President, Vice President and Representatives in Congress (Chairman: Eugene Worley; Ranking Member: Ralph A. Gamble)
- Elections No.#1 (Chairman: C. Jasper Bell; Ranking Member: Clarence E. Hancock)
- Elections No.#2 (Chairman: Ed Gossett; Ranking Member: Francis D. Culkin then Stephen A. Day)
- Elections No.#3 (Chairman: Hugh Peterson; Ranking Member: Charles A. Plumley)
- Enrolled Bills (Chairman: Arthur G. Klein; Ranking Member: Charles Aubrey Eaton)
- Expenditures in the Executive Departments (Chairman: Carter Manasco; Ranking Member: Charles L. Gifford)
- Flood Control (Chairman: William M. Whittington; Ranking Member: Harry Lane Englebright then Charles R. Clason)
- Foreign Affairs (Chairman: Sol Bloom; Ranking Member: Charles Aubrey Eaton)
- Immigration and Naturalization (Chairman: Samuel Dickstein; Ranking Member: Noah M. Mason)
- Indian Affairs (Chairman: James F. O'Connor; Ranking Member: Fred C. Gilchrist)
- Insular Affairs (Chairman: C. Jasper Bell; Ranking Member: Richard J. Welch)
- Interstate and Foreign Commerce (Chairman: Clarence F. Lea; Ranking Member: Charles A. Wolverton)
- Labor (Chairman: Mary Teresa Norton; Ranking Member: Richard J. Welch)
- Memorials (Chairman: John R. Murdock; Ranking Member: Allen T. Treadway)
- Merchant Marine and Fisheries (Chairman: S. Otis Bland; Ranking Member: Richard J. Welch)
- Military Affairs (Chairman: Andrew J. May; Ranking Member: Walter G. Andrews)
- Invalid Pensions (Chairman: John Lesinski; Ranking Member: Robert A. Grant)
- Investigate Acts of Executive Agencies Beyond their Scope of Authority (Select) (Chairman: N/A)
- Investigate the Federal Communications Commission (Select) (Chairman: Edward E. Cox)
- Irrigation and Reclamation (Chairman: Compton I. White; Ranking Member: Dewey Jackson Short)
- Judiciary (Chairman: Hatton W. Sumners; Ranking Member: Ulysses S. Guyer then Clarence E. Hancock)
- Mines and Mining (Chairman: Joe L. Smith; Ranking Member: Harry Lane Englebright then John M. Robsion)
- Investigate the Seizure of Montgomery Ward and Company (Select) (Chairman: N/A)
- Naval Affairs (Chairman: Carl Vinson; Ranking Member: Melvin J. Maas)
- Patents (Chairman: Frank W. Boykin; Ranking Member: Fred A. Hartley Jr.)
- Pensions (Chairman: Charles A. Buckley; Ranking Member: Fred J. Douglas)
- Post Office and Post Roads (Chairman: Thomas G. Burch; Ranking Member: Fred A. Hartley Jr.)
- Post-War Military Policy (Select) (Chairman: Clifton A. Woodrum)
- Post-War Economic Policy and Planning (Special) (Chairman: N/A; Ranking Member: N/A)
- Printing (Chairman: Pete Jarman; Ranking Member: N/A)
- Public Buildings and Grounds (Chairman: Fritz G. Lanham; Ranking Member: Pehr G. Holmes)
- Public Lands (Chairman: J. Hardin Peterson; Ranking Member: Harry Lane Englebright)
- Revision of Laws (Chairman: Eugene J. Keogh; Ranking Member: Earl C. Michener)
- Rivers and Harbors (Chairman: Joseph J. Mansfield; Ranking Member: Albert E. Carter)
- Roads (Chairman: J.W. Robinson; Ranking Member: Jesse P. Wolcott)
- Rules (Chairman: Adolph J. Sabath; Ranking Member: Hamilton Fish III)
- Small Business (Select) (Chairman: Wright Patman; Ranking Member: Usher L. Burdick)
- Standards of Official Conduct
- Territories (Chairman: Robert A. Green; Ranking Member: Usher L. Burdick)
- War Claims (Chairman: Edward J. Hart; Ranking Member: Clare E. Hoffman)
- Ways and Means (Chairman: Robert L. Doughton; Ranking Member: Allen T. Treadway)
- World War Veterans' Legislation (Chairman: John E. Rankin; Ranking Member: Edith Nourse Rogers)
- Whole

=== Joint committees ===
- Commemorate the Centennial of the Telegraph
- Conditions of Indian Tribes (Special)
- Disposition of (Useless) Executive Papers
- The Library (Chairman: Sen. Alben W. Barkley)
- Reduction of Nonessential Federal Expenditures (Chairman: Sen. Harry F. Byrd; Vice Chairman: Rep. Robert L. Doughton)
- Organization of Congress
- Printing (Chairman: Sen. Carl Hayden; Vice Chairman: Rep. Pete Jarman)
- Selective Service Deferments
- Taxation (Chairman: Sen. Walter F. George; Vice Chairman: Rep. Robert L. Doughton)

== Caucuses ==
- Democratic (House)
- Democratic (Senate)

== Employees ==
=== Legislative branch agency directors ===
- Architect of the Capitol: David Lynn
- Attending Physician of the United States Congress: George Calver
- Comptroller General of the United States: Lindsay C. Warren
- Librarian of Congress: Archibald MacLeish, until 1944
- Public Printer of the United States: Augustus E. Giegengack

=== Senate ===
- Chaplain: Frederick Brown Harris (Methodist)
- Parliamentarian: Charles Watkins
- Secretary: Edwin A. Halsey
- Librarian: Ruskin McArdle
- Secretary for the Majority: Leslie Biffle
- Secretary for the Minority: Carl A. Loeffler
- Sergeant at Arms: Chesley W. Jurney, until January 31, 1943
  - Wall Doxey, from February 1, 1943

=== House of Representatives ===
- Chaplain: James Shera Montgomery (Methodist)
- Clerk: South Trimble
- Doorkeeper: Joseph J. Sinnott, until January 27, 1943
  - Ralph R. Roberts, from February 5, 1943
- Parliamentarian: Lewis Deschler
- Postmaster: Finis E. Scott
- Reading Clerks: George J. Maurer (D) and Alney E. Chaffee (R)
- Sergeant at Arms: Kenneth Romney

== See also ==
- 1942 United States elections (elections leading to this Congress)
  - 1942 United States Senate elections
  - 1942 United States House of Representatives elections
- 1944 United States elections (elections during this Congress, leading to the next Congress)
  - 1944 United States presidential election
  - 1944 United States Senate elections
  - 1944 United States House of Representatives elections
