= Lula J. Davis =

American government official

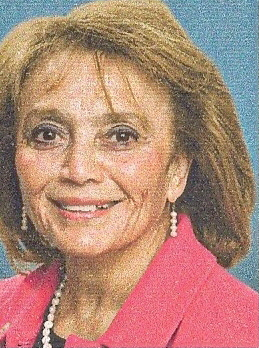

Secretary for the Majority of the United States Senate
- In office January 2008 – January 2011
- Preceded by: Martin P. Paone
- Succeeded by: Gary B. Myrick

Personal details
- Born: Louisiana
- Education: Southern University

Lula Johnson Davis was Secretary for the Majority of the United States Senate from 2008 to 2011. Davis was born in Louisiana. She received a B.S. in office administration and an M.Ed., in guidance counseling from Southern University in Baton Rouge, Louisiana. She began her career with the Senate as a legislative correspondent for Senator Russell B. Long of Louisiana. After Senator Long retired from the Senate in January 1987, Davis worked as an office assistant for the Democratic Policy Committee's Senate floor staff office. In 1993, she became a member of the Democratic floor staff. In 1995, she was promoted to chief floor assistant. In 1997, she assumed the position of assistant secretary. After the retirement of Martin P. Paone, in January 2008, the Senate elected Davis Secretary for the Majority. As Secretary for the Majority, she was a senior procedural advisor to the Senate Majority Leader, Senator Harry Reid, and supervised the day-to-day Senate schedule. In so doing, she often worked with Secretary for the Minority David J. Schiappa. Davis told Senators what they could and could not do when it came to rules and procedure. Consequently, Davis was called “one of the most powerful unelected people in the U.S. Senate.” Davis retired at the end of the 111th Congress.
