= Martin P. Paone =

American politician (born 1951)

Martin P. Paone (born March 1, 1951) is a former Secretary for the Majority of the United States Senate and, for the last two years of the Obama administration, was Deputy Assistant to the President for Legislative Affairs at the White House. He was Senior Advisor at the bipartisan lobbying firm the Prime Policy Group from April 2017 to June 2024. He is now fully retired.

Paone was born in Everett, Massachusetts. He is a 1972 graduate of Boston College and holds a Master's Degree in Russian Studies from Georgetown University. It was while attending graduate school that Mr. Paone first worked on the Hill, holding jobs in the House Post Office and Senate Parking Office. Mr. Paone served as the Executive Vice President of Prime Policy Group.

His professional Senate experience includes: assistant in the Democratic Cloakroom from 1979–82; floor staff for the Democratic Policy Committee from 1982–91; and Assistant Secretary for the Majority from 1991-94. In 1995 he became Secretary for the Minority by the Democratic Caucus, was elected Secretary for the Majority when the Democrats went into the Majority in June 2001 and again in 2007 at the start of the 110th Congress. Mr. Paone also previously served as Secretary for the Minority for the 108th and 109th Congresses. Mr. Paone retired from his position on January 23, 2008. He was succeeded in the office by his deputy, Lula J. Davis.
