= Mustering-out Payment Act =

1944 United States federal law

- Other short titles: Mustering-out Payment Act of 1944
- Long title: An Act To provide for mustering-out payments to persons honorably discharged from the armed forces during the present war, and for other purposes
- Enacted by: the 78th United States Congress

Citations
- Public law: Pub. L. 78–225
- Statutes at Large: 58 Stat. 8

Codification
- Titles amended: 38

Legislative history
- Introduced in the House as H.R. 3919 by Andrew J. May; Committee consideration by House Military Affairs; Passed the House on; Passed the Senate on; Signed into law by President Franklin D. Roosevelt on February 3, 1944

The Mustering-out Payment Act is a United States federal law passed in 1944. It provided money to servicemen, returning from the Second World War, to help them restart their lives as civilians.

== See also ==
- Demobilization
- Serviceman
- G.I. Bill
