= Gary B. Myrick =

American government official

Secretary for the Minority of the United States Senate
- Incumbent
- Assumed office January 3, 2025
- Preceded by: Robert M. Duncan
- In office January 3, 2015 – January 20, 2021
- Preceded by: Laura C. Dove
- Succeeded by: Robert M. Duncan

Secretary for the Majority of the United States Senate
- In office January 20, 2021 – January 3, 2025
- Preceded by: Robert M. Duncan
- In office January 3, 2011 – January 3, 2015
- Preceded by: Lula J. Davis
- Succeeded by: Laura C. Dove

Personal details
- Education: University of Maine, American University

Gary B. Myrick is Secretary for the Minority of the United States Senate.

As Secretary for the Minority, Myrick is chief procedural advisor to the Senate Democratic Leader, Senator Charles Schumer, and supervises the minority's reaction to the day-to-day Senate schedule. Roll Call reporters and editors have repeatedly cited Myrick among leading Capitol Hill staffers. Myrick helped manage Senate passage of, among other things, the Water Resources Development Act of 2013, the 2013 Farm Bill, and the immigration reform bill of 2013.

Myrick served as Senate Majority Leader Harry Reid’s Chief of Staff in the 110th and 111th Congresses. In this post, Myrick oversaw the Majority Leader’s staff and was responsible for helping craft policy, develop strategy, and conduct outreach on behalf of the Majority Leader and Democratic Caucus. The Senate elected Myrick Secretary for the Majority on January 5, 2011. After the Republicans took back the majority in the 2014 elections, Myrick moved from Secretary for the Majority to Secretary for the Minority. In January 2021, he returned to being Secretary for the Majority.

Myrick joined Senator Reid’s office in 2003, when Reid, then Senate Minority Whip, asked him to serve as his Floor Counsel. In this position, Myrick quickly became one of Senator Reid’s top aides, and in 2005 he was named Deputy Chief of Staff.

Schumer is the fourth Senate Democratic Leader for whom Myrick has worked. He started his Senate career as an intern for Senate Majority Leader George J. Mitchell while attending the University of Maine. After graduating, he moved to Washington, D.C., to work as a staff assistant in Senator Mitchell’s office and as a member of Mitchell’s Cloakroom staff. While working in the Democratic Cloakroom, Myrick attended night classes at the Washington College of Law at American University, earning a J.D. in 1995. When Mitchell retired in 1995, Gary joined the Senate Floor Staff under incoming Democratic Leader Tom Daschle.

Myrick lives in Arlington, Virginia, with his wife, Lauren, and their son, Henry.
