= John R. Murdock (politician) =

American politician

John Murdock
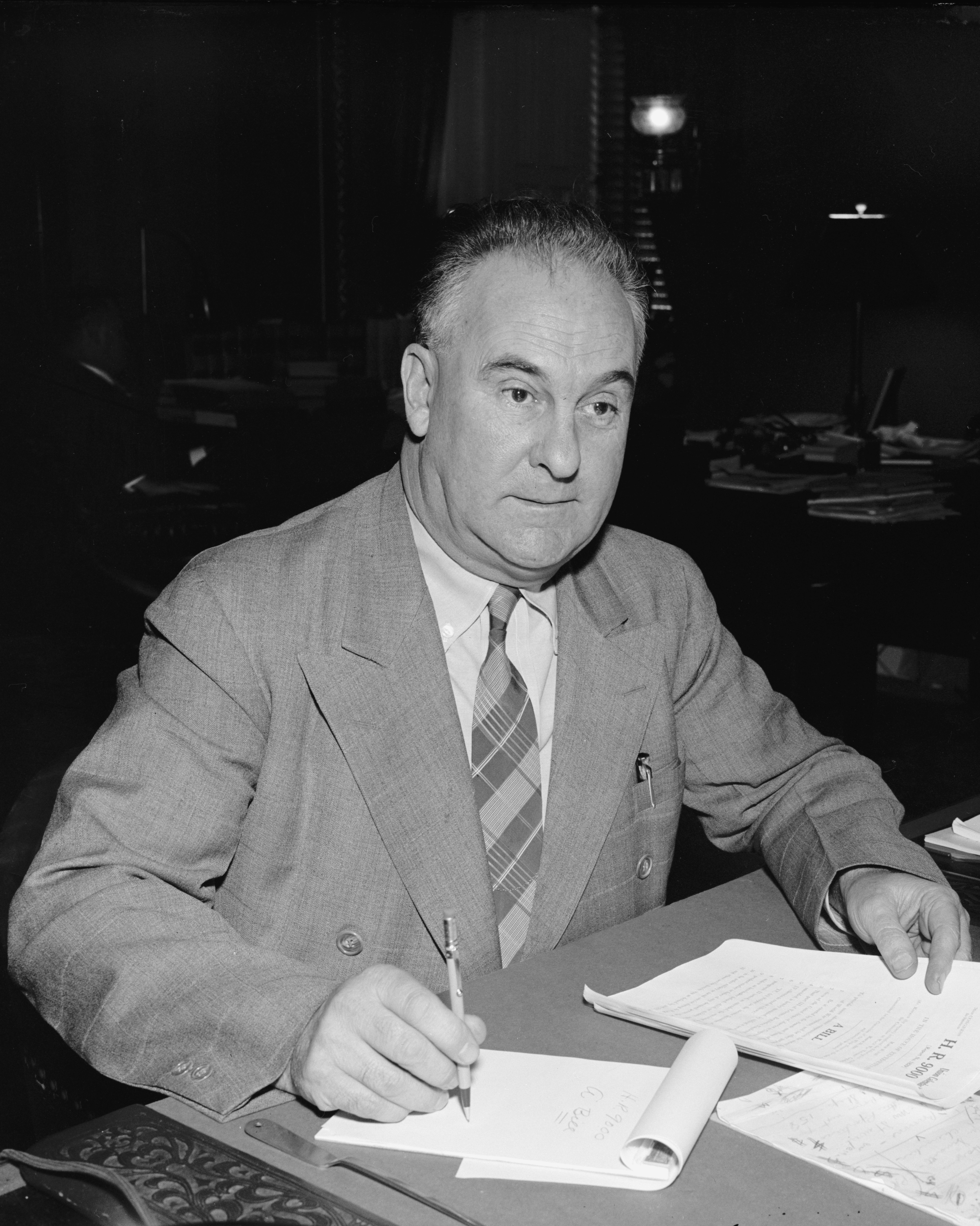
- Murdock in 1940

Member of the U.S. House of Representatives from Arizona
- In office January 3, 1937 – January 3, 1953
- Preceded by: Isabella Greenway
- Succeeded by: John Rhodes
- Constituency: At-large district (1937–1949); 1st district (1949–1953)

Personal details
- Born: John Robert Murdock; April 20, 1885 Lewistown, Missouri, U.S.
- Died: February 14, 1972 (aged 86) Phoenix, Arizona, U.S.
- Party: Democratic
- Spouse: Myrtle Cheney
- Education: Truman State University (AA); University of Iowa (BA); University of Arizona (attended); University of California, Berkeley (attended)

John Robert Murdock (April 20, 1885 – February 14, 1972) was a U.S. representative from Arizona.

Born in homestead near Lewistown, Missouri, Murdock attended the public schools. He graduated from State Teachers' College, Kirksville, Missouri, in 1912 and received a bachelor's degree at the University of Iowa in 1925. He attended graduate school at the University of Arizona and the University of California at Berkeley.

He was an elementary school teacher and principal in Missouri before he went to the University of Iowa. He was an instructor in the Normal School at Tempe, Arizona, predecessor of Arizona State University. He was then Dean of this institution from 1933 to 1937. He wrote several textbooks on history and government.

Murdock was elected as a Democrat to the 75th Congress and to the seven succeeding Congresses, serving from January 3, 1937 to January 3, 1953. For his first six terms, he was one of two at-large congressmen from Arizona. When the state was split into two districts in 1948, Murdock was elected from the 1st District, comprising Phoenix and Maricopa County. He served as chairman of the Committee on Memorials (Seventy-eighth Congress), Committee on Irrigation and Reclamation (Seventy-ninth Congress), and Committee on Interior and Insular Affairs (Eighty-second Congress). He was an unsuccessful candidate for reelection in 1952 to the Eighty-third Congress, losing to Republican challenger John Jacob Rhodes. He was the first Democratic incumbent to lose a House election in the state.

He was married to Myrtle Cheney Murdock, who popularized the accomplishments of Constantino Brumidi.

After retirement he resided in Scottsdale, Arizona and died in Phoenix, Arizona on February 14, 1972. He was interred in Double Butte Cemetery, Tempe, Arizona.

== See also ==
- List of members of the House Un-American Activities Committee

U.S. House of Representatives
Preceded by Isabella Greenway	Member of the U.S. House of Representatives from Arizona's at-large congressional district 1937–1949	Constituency abolished
New constituency	Member of the U.S. House of Representatives from Arizona's 1st congressional district 1949–1953	Succeeded by John Rhodes
Preceded by Hardin Peterson as Chair of the House Public Lands Committee	Chair of the House Interior Committee; 1951–1953	Succeeded by Arthur L. Miller
