= Laura Dove =

American academic administrator and political staffer (born 1969)

- Born: 1969 (age 56–57)
- Education: University of North Carolina at Chapel Hill; University of Virginia
- Occupations: academic administrator, political staffer
- Years active: 1986–present
- Father: Robert Dove

Laura Dove (born 1969) is an American academic administrator serving as the senior director of administration at the Harvard Institute of Politics since 2023. She was previously a political staffer at the United States Senate from the 1986 to 2020.

== Career ==
Dove and her identical twin sister were born in 1969. Their father, Robert Dove, was a United States Senate employee who later served as the parliamentarian. She earned a B.A. from the University of North Carolina at Chapel Hill and a master's degree from University of Virginia.

In 1986, Dove became a page to Bob Dole. She spent more than twenty years working for the United States Senate, in various roles in Republican leadership offices and ultimately as secretary for the majority under leader Mitch McConnell. Dove retired from the Senate in 2020 and served as federal government relations director for Ford Motor Company before transitioning to her current academic focus. Dove was a Pritzker Fellow at the University of Chicago, where she led a seminar focused on the role of the Senate. In February 2023, Dove became the senior director for administration at the Harvard Institute of Politics, where she works to inspire students to enter public service. In July 2023, Dove was nominated by U.S. president Joe Biden to serve as a trustee of the James Madison Memorial Fellowship Foundation.

== Personal life ==
As of 2023, Dove lives with her family in Alexandria, Virginia.
