= Party secretaries of the United States Senate =

Partisan legislative assistants in the US Senate

Party secretaries of the U.S. Senate

Secretary for the majority
Robert M. Duncan (R)

Secretary for the minority
Gary B. Myrick (D)

The secretary for the majority and secretary for the minority of the United States Senate are officers of the Senate who act as advisors and assistants to the Senators. The party secretaries are distinguished from the secretary of the Senate as they are officials who work on behalf of one party rather than the entire assembly. The current secretary for the majority is Robert M. Duncan (Republican) and the secretary for the minority is Gary B. Myrick (Democratic).

The secretaries are also referred to as the secretary to the majority leader and secretary to the minority leader, the majority secretary and minority secretary, or the Democratic secretary and Republican secretary

== History ==
According to Robert Byrd, the roles of the secretaries were preceded by the positions of assistant doorkeeper and acting assistant doorkeeper of the Senate, also referred to as assistant sergeants at arms. These positions were initially aides to the sergeant at arms and had responsibilities for security during sittings. However, beginning around 1896, the positions were used as sinecures for legislative assistants selected by the parties who worked on the floor of the Senate. The Legislative Pay Act of 1929 established the positions of secretary for the majority and secretary for the minority, and discontinued the assistant doorkeeper positions. When the law came into effect, the incumbent assistant doorkeepers, Carl A. Loeffler and Edwin A. Halsey were elected to the newly created secretary posts.

== Appointment and tenure ==
The secretaries are nominated by the party conferences and elected by the members of the Senate. Like other officers of the Senate, they do not serve fixed terms. When control of the Senate changes, their titles change to match the majority or minority status of their party.

== Duties and responsibilities ==
The Senate Rules state simply that "the secretary for the majority and the secretary for the minority shall be assigned, during the daily sessions of the Senate, to duty upon the Senate Floor" and indicate that the secretary is supervised by their corresponding party leader.

The party secretaries are responsible for sharing information among their party's Senators, conducting polling within the caucus and assisting the party leaders with scheduling. They also supervise the cloakroom staff and oversee the pages that serve the Senators of their party. Former Republican secretary Laura Dove likened serving in the role to being a golf caddie at Augusta National Golf Club or the Hand of the King in A Song of Ice and Fire.

While the Senate is in session, they are seated in chairs on either side of the Senate dais beside and slightly behind the presiding officer on the side corresponding to their party, with an assistant secretary seated beside them. There are also two large roll-top desks located in the corners of the chamber for their use. The secretary's desk on the Democratic side serves as their candy desk.

== Officeholders ==
Note: In the tables below, party secretaries who went on to serve as secretary of the Senate are denoted with §

Democratic Party secretaries:

Name	Years of service
Edwin A. Halsey §	1929–1933
Leslie L. Biffle §	1933–1945
Felton M. Johnston §	1945–1955
Robert G. Baker	1955–1963
Francis R. Valeo §	1963–1966
J. Stanley Kimmitt §	1966–1977
James H. Duffy	1977–1979
Walter J. Stewart §	1979–1981
Terence E. Sauvain	1981–1983
Patrick J. Griffin	1983–1985
David Pratt	1985–1987
C. Abbott Saffold	1987–1995
Martin P. Paone	1995–2008
Lula Johnson Davis	2008–2010
Gary B. Myrick	2011–present

Republican Party secretaries:

Name	Years of service
Carl A. Loeffler §	1929–1947
J. Mark Trice §	1947–1953
William T. Reed	1953–1955
J. Mark Trice	1955–1973
William Hildenbrand §	1974–1981
Howard O. Greene Jr.	1981–1995
Elizabeth Letchworth	1995–2001
David J. Schiappa	2001–2013
Laura Dove	2013–2020
Robert Duncan	2020–present

== See also ==
- Secretary of the United States Senate
- Sergeant at Arms of the United States Senate
- Party leaders of the United States Senate
- Democratic Caucus secretary
- Republican Conference secretary
