= David J. Schiappa =

American politician (born 1962)

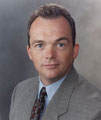
- David Schiappa (official Senate photograph)
- Born: November 3, 1962 (age 64); Washington, D.C., U.S.
- Education: University of Maryland; Johns Hopkins University
- Occupations: Political staffer, lobbyist
- Years active: 1984–2013 (Senate staffer)
- Employer: The Duberstein Group (2013–present)
- Known for: Secretary for the Minority, United States Senate (2001–2013)
- Political party: Republican
- Spouse: Married
- Children: 2

David J. Schiappa (born November 3, 1962) was a Republican staff member of the United States Senate from 1984 to 2013, most recently as Secretary for the Minority. He is now a vice president at The Duberstein Group. He is a native of Washington, D.C., and a 1984 graduate of the University of Maryland and Johns Hopkins University in the School of Professional studies in Business and Education.

Mr. Schiappa began work in the Senate in 1984 in the Senate Republican Cloakroom. In 1994, Republicans regained the Majority and Mr. Schiappa became the Republican Floor Assistant under the direction of the Secretary for the Majority. He was appointed the Assistant Secretary for the Majority in 1996 and served in that capacity until August, 2001 when he was elected to the post of Secretary for the Minority. The Republicans took the majority in the 108th Congress at which time Mr. Schiappa became the Secretary for the Majority. When Democrats took control of the Senate for the 110th Congress, Mr. Schiappa was again selected to serve as Secretary for the Minority. He retired from Senate service on August 1, 2013. Mr. Schiappa is married, has two children, and resides in Davidsonville, Maryland.
