= Frank A. Mathews Jr. =

American politician (1890-1964)

Frank Matthews, Jr.
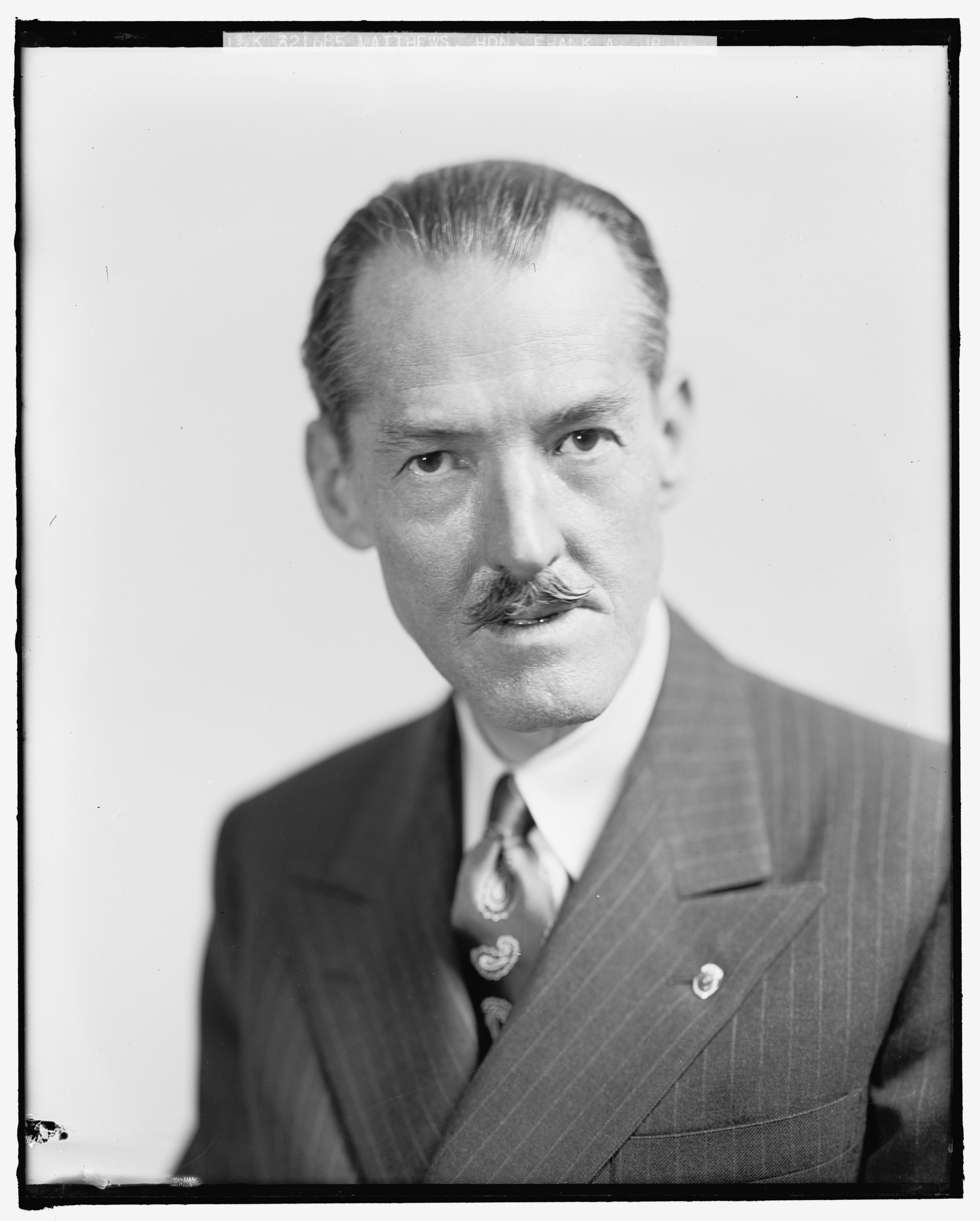

Member of the U.S. House of Representatives from New Jersey's 4th district
- In office November 6, 1945 – January 3, 1949
- Preceded by: D. Lane Powers
- Succeeded by: Charles R. Howell

Personal details
- Born: Frank Asbury Mathews Jr. August 3, 1890 Philadelphia, Pennsylvania, U.S.
- Died: February 5, 1964 (aged 73) Camden, New Jersey, U.S.
- Resting place: Morgan Cemetery in Palmyra, New Jersey
- Party: Republican

Frank Asbury Mathews Jr. (August 3, 1890 – February 5, 1964) was an American lawyer and Republican Party politician from New Jersey. Mathews represented New Jersey's 4th congressional district in the United States House of Representatives for two terms from 1945 to 1949.

== Early life and career ==
Mathews was born in Philadelphia, Pennsylvania, on August 3, 1890, and attended the public schools of Palmyra, New Jersey.

During World War I, he served in the United States Army Ordnance Department from September 1917 to May 1919, with nineteen months’ service overseas. He graduated from Temple University Law School in 1920, was admitted to the bar in 1919 and commenced practice in Camden, New Jersey.

=== Early career ===
He was a judge of the district court of the first judicial district of Burlington County, New Jersey, from 1929 to 1933, served as assistant counsel for the State Highway Department of New Jersey from 1933 to 1944 and was a deputy attorney general of New Jersey in 1944 and 1945. Mathews served as division judge advocate of the Forty-fourth Division from September 16, 1940, until relieved from active duty on October 15, 1940.

== Congress ==
Mathews was elected as a Republican to the Seventy-ninth Congress to fill the vacancy caused by the resignation of D. Lane Powers. He was reelected in 1946 to the Eightieth Congress and served in office from November 6, 1945, to January 3, 1949, but was not a candidate for renomination in 1948.

== Later life ==
After he left Congress, Mathews was again appointed deputy attorney general of New Jersey and served from 1949 to 1953, after which he resumed the practice of law.

=== Death and burial ===
He was a resident of Riverton, New Jersey until his death in Camden, New Jersey on February 5, 1964. He was interred in Morgan Cemetery in Palmyra, New Jersey.

U.S. House of Representatives
Preceded by D. Lane Powers	Member of the U.S. House of Representatives from New Jersey's 4th congressional district November 6, 1945—January 3, 1949	Succeeded by Charles R. Howell
