= Edwin A. Halsey =

15th Secretary of the US Senate

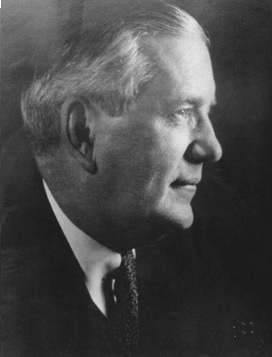
- Halsey in 1938

15th Secretary of the United States Senate
- In office March 9, 1933 – January 29, 1945
- Leader: Joseph T. Robinson
- Preceded by: Edwin Pope Thayer
- Succeeded by: Leslie Biffle

Personal details
- Born: Edwin Alexander Halsey; September 4, 1881 Near Lynchburg, Virginia, U.S.
- Died: January 29, 1945 (aged 63) Washington, D.C., U.S.
- Party: Democratic
- Education: Virginia Polytechnic Institute
- Occupation: Senate administrator

Edwin Alexander Halsey (September 4, 1881 – January 29, 1945) was an American politician, who served as the 15th Secretary of the United States Senate from 1933 until his death in 1945.

== Early life and career ==
Halsey was born near Lynchburg, Virginia. He is the son of a lawyer who had served as a Confederate Army captain. After attending local schools and briefly studying at the Virginia Polytechnic Institute, he began his Senate career at age 16 in the press gallery in 1897, aided by his uncle, Senator John W. Daniel. Over the next 16 years, he rose to assistant superintendent of the press gallery while earning the honorary title "Colonel" through appointments to Virginia governors' staffs.

== Senate career ==
In 1913, Halsey transitioned to the Senate floor as a Democratic floor assistant. By 1929, the Senate created the role of party secretary, appointing Halsey as the first Democratic Party secretary. He simultaneously served as secretary-treasurer of the Democratic Senatorial Campaign Committee (1928–1944), organizing campaign strategies and maintaining detailed political records later archived at the Library of Congress.

Elected Secretary of the Senate on March 9, 1933, Halsey assumed office during the tumultuous "Hundred Days" of the New Deal. His tenure saw unprecedented legislative activity, including the Emergency Banking Act and efforts to combat the Great Depression. To manage the surge in Senate workload, he supported institutional reforms, such as separating the roles of parliamentarian and journal clerk in 1937.

Halsey prioritized historical preservation, transferring 4,000 linear feet of Senate records to the National Archives in 1937 and authoring reference books like Enactment of a Law (1934) and Presidential Vetoes (1935). He also organized presidential inaugurations, including Franklin D. Roosevelt’s 1945 ceremony at the White House.

== Death and legacy ==
Halsey died of a heart condition on January 29, 1945, nine days after Roosevelt’s fourth inauguration. The Senate adjourned in mourning, honoring his 48 years of service.

Halsey’s papers, including correspondence with Senator Harry S. Truman, are held at the Harry S. Truman Presidential Library and Museum and the Library of Congress.

== See also ==
- Secretary of the United States Senate
- New Deal
- National Archives and Records Administration
