= D. Lane Powers =

American politician

David L. Powers
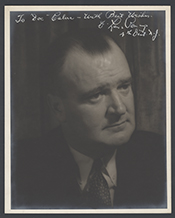

Member of the U.S. House of Representatives from New Jersey's 4th district
- In office March 4, 1933 – August 30, 1945
- Preceded by: Charles Aubrey Eaton
- Succeeded by: Frank A. Mathews, Jr.

Member of the New Jersey General Assembly
- In office 1928-1930

Personal details
- Born: David Lane Powers; July 29, 1896 Philadelphia, Pennsylvania, U.S.
- Died: March 28, 1968 (aged 71) Feasterville, Pennsylvania, U.S.
- Resting place: Riverview Cemetery, Trenton, New Jersey
- Party: Republican
- Profession: Politician

David Lane Powers (July 29, 1896 – March 28, 1968) was an American World War I veteran who served as a Republican Party politician who represented New Jersey's 4th congressional district in the United States House of Representatives for seven terms from 1933 to 1945.

== Early life and career ==
Born in Philadelphia, Pennsylvania, Powers attended the public schools, and was graduated from Pennsylvania Military College at Chester, Pennsylvania in 1915.

=== World War I ===
During World War I, he was commissioned a second lieutenant on August 15, 1917. He was promoted to first lieutenant and served as battalion adjutant in the Eight Hundred and Seventh Pioneer Infantry.

=== Early career ===
He moved to Trenton, in 1919 and engaged in the building business. He served as member of the New Jersey General Assembly from 1928 to 1930.

== Congress ==
Powers was elected as a Republican to the Seventy-third and to the six succeeding Congresses and served from March 4, 1933, until his resignation on August 30, 1945, to become a member of the New Jersey Public Utilities Commission, a post he held until retirement in 1967.

== Death and burial ==
He died in Feasterville, Pennsylvania, March 28, 1968, and was interred in Riverview Cemetery, Trenton, New Jersey.

U.S. House of Representatives
Preceded by Charles Aubrey Eaton	Member of the U.S. House of Representatives from New Jersey's 4th congressional district March 4, 1933—August 30, 1945	Succeeded by Frank A. Mathews, Jr.
