= United States Senate Committee on Interoceanic Canals =

The United States Senate Committee on Interoceanic Canals was established on December 15, 1899 and terminated on January 2, 1947, when its functions were transferred to the Committee on Interstate and Foreign Commerce. The Committee on Interoceanic Canals succeeded the Select Committee on the Construction of the Nicaragua Canal, 1895-99. The initial focus of this committee was on legislation to authorize the construction of an isthmian canal to connect the Atlantic and Pacific Oceans.

== Chairmen of the Committee on Interoceanic Canals ==
- John T. Morgan (D-AL) 1899-1903
- vacant 1903-1904
- John H. Mitchell (R-OR) 1905
- Joseph H. Millard (R-NE) 1905-190
- Alfred B. Kittredge (R-SD) 1907-1909
- Frank Flint (R-CA) 1909-1911
- Frank B. Brandegee (R-CT) 1911-1913
- James A. O'Gorman (D-NY) 1913-1917
- John K. Shields (D-TN) 1917-1919
- William E. Borah (R-ID) 1919-1922
- Walter Edge (R-NJ) 1922-1930
- Thomas D. Schall (R-MN) 1930-1933
- Thomas P. Gore (D-OK) 1933-1937
- Bennett Champ Clark (D-MO) 1937-1945
- Tom Stewart (D-TN) 1945-1947
