= Carl A. Loeffler =

American administrator (1873–1968)

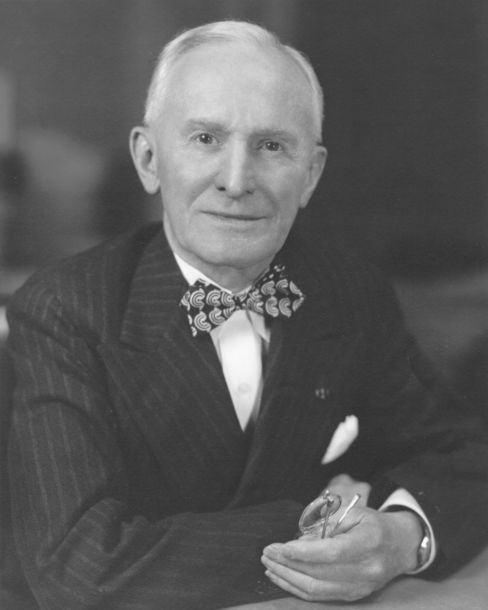
- Loeffler, c. 1947–1949

16th Secretary of the United States Senate
- In office January 4, 1947 – January 3, 1949
- Leader: Wallace H. White
- Preceded by: Leslie Biffle
- Succeeded by: Leslie Biffle

Personal details
- Born: Carl August Loeffler; January 12, 1873 Washington D.C., U.S.
- Died: January 30, 1968 (aged 95)
- Spouse: Minnie Schneider (m. 1901)
- Education: Spencerian Business College; George Washington University

Carl August Loeffler (January 12, 1873 – January 30, 1968) was an American congressional administrator who served as the Secretary of the United States Senate from 1947 to 1949. A career staff member on Capitol Hill, Loeffler began work in the Senate as a page in 1889 and remained in Senate service for nearly six decades before attaining the chamber’s top administrative post.

== Early life and education ==
Carl August Loeffler was born on January 12, 1873, in Washington, D.C. His father, Major Charles Loeffler, a German immigrant and U.S. Army veteran who later served as the White House head doorkeeper, arranged for the 15-year-old Carl to take a page position in the United States Senate in 1889 at the suggestion of Senator Matthew Quay.

While working, Loeffler studied at Spencerian Business College and George Washington University.

== Career ==
=== Senate career ===
From his start as a page assisting the chamber’s early telephone operations, Loeffler advanced through a series of staff posts over several decades, including assistant doorkeeper and assistant sergeant at arms. In 1929 Senate Republicans elected him party secretary, a position he held for 18 years. Contemporary observers frequently remarked on his encyclopedic institutional knowledge. The New York Times congressional correspondent William S. White wrote that “almost certainly, no one alive knows quite so much as he about the operations of the Senate.”

=== Secretary of the Senate ===
With Republicans taking control of the 80th United States Congress following the 1946 elections, the Senate on January 4, 1947, elected Loeffler as Secretary of the Senate. His tenure coincided with implementation of the Legislative Reorganization Act of 1946, which reshaped committee jurisdictions and permitted members and committees to hire professional staff, significantly expanding administrative responsibilities within the institution.

Described by contemporaries as “neat, gray, and affably punctilious,” Loeffler was regarded by senators of both parties as able, conscientious, and discreet. When Democrats regained the majority after the 1948 elections, Loeffler’s predecessor Leslie Biffle returned to the office in January 1949, and Loeffler left the post at the end of the Congress. Senators recorded tributes to Loeffler’s service in the Congressional Record at the close of the session.

== Writings ==
After retiring, Loeffler prepared a lengthy, unpublished memoir reflecting on Senate operations from the late nineteenth century onward. In 1980 his daughter donated a typescript of roughly 600 pages to the Senate Historical Office, where it serves as a resource for historians. Excerpts including a light verse titled “In Conference” have been highlighted by the Senate Historical Office.

== Personal life and death ==
Loeffler married Minnie Schneider on April 17, 1901 in Washington D.C.

He died on January 30, 1968, at the age of 95.

== See also ==
- Sergeant at Arms of the United States Senate
