= Kenneth Romney =

Sergeant at Arms of the United States House of Representatives

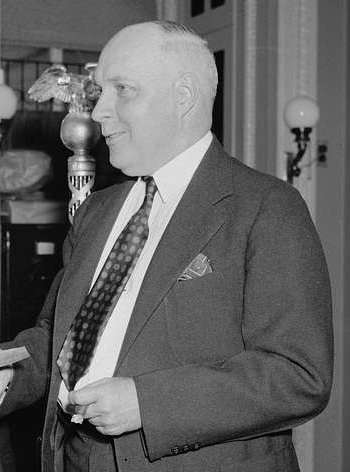
- Kenneth Romney in front of the Mace of the Republic, 1938

25th Sergeant at Arms of the United States House of Representatives
- In office December 7, 1931 – January 3, 1947
- Leader: John Nance Garner; Henry Thomas Rainey; Jo Byrns; William B. Bankhead; Sam Rayburn
- Preceded by: Joseph G. Rodgers
- Succeeded by: William F. Russell

Personal details
- Born: October 20, 1885 Missoula, Montana
- Died: April 6, 1952 (aged 66) Arlington, Virginia
- Resting place: Riverview Cemetery, Hamilton, Montana
- Spouse: Edith Romney
- Education: University of Washington; George Washington University

Kenneth Romney (abt 1883—1952) was a journalist and editor and the 25th Sergeant at Arms of the United States House of Representatives, from 1931 to 1947.

He was later found to have embezzled $143,863 from office accounts together with former Representative John H. Smithwick of Florida, who could not be indicted. Romney was sentenced to one and three years in prison for the shortfall and operating a bank with no legal authority.

== Early career ==
Romney was born in 1886 in near Hamilton, Montana in the Bitterroot Valley. He graduated from the journalism school of the University of Washington at Seattle.

Romney began his career as a journalist and editor. In 1914, he left Montana to take up a position as bill clerk with the US House of Representatives on a salary of $1,500/year. In 1915 he became Assistant Sergeant at Arms; a position he held until 1917. In 1917, he became cashier to the House of Representatives; he worked in the cashier's office until 1930.

In 1919, while in the cashier's office, Romney co-founded the Little Congress, a venue for congressional Staff members to learn parliamentary procedure. Lyndon Johnson would become a member.

Romney was appointed Sergeant at Arms in December 1931. Romney also operated his office as a bank for members of the House of Representatives.

Romney also served as chief tally clerk for the 1932 and 1936 Democratic National Conventions, gaining a motion of appreciation in 1936 for his work.

In 1940, Romney wrote The Mace of the House of Representatives of the United States, a short history of the Mace of the Republic.

== Criminal Charges ==
Romney was caught concealing a $143,863 shortage in his office accounts due to transactions with former Representative John H. Smithwick of Florida, who could not be indicted due to the statute at limitations.

A criminal case against Romney was started in 1947, and he was convicted and sentenced to between one and three years in prison for the shortfall and operating a bank with no legal authority. While in office in 1931, he was found to have written to Smithwick "we have been jointly guilty of fraud"

He later lost an appeal of his conviction. Justice Alexander Holtzoff, who presided over the case in district courts, offered him a relatively lenient sentence due to the others involved in the crime being beyond the statute of limitations.

== Recognition ==
For his work as the chief tally clerk for the 1932 and 1936 Democratic National Conventions, the convention resolved in 1936:

"RESOLVED: That the thanks of this convention should be extended to Mr. Kenneth Romney, Sergeant at Arms of the House of Representatives and Chief Tally Clerk of the Democratic Convention, for the careful and intelligent manner in which he has exercised his duties during the convention."

== Personal life ==
Romney married Edna Fullerton in 1910. The couple had one son, Kenneth Jr. Romney died on 6 April 1952 of a heart attack in Arlington, Virginia.
