= Dan R. McGehee =

American politician (1883–1962)

Daniel Rayford McGehee (September 10, 1883 – February 9, 1962) was an American businessman, lawyer, and politician who served six terms as a U.S. representative from Mississippi from 1935 to 1947.

== Biography ==
Born in Little Springs, Mississippi, McGehee attended the public schools. He was graduated from Mississippi College at Clinton in 1903 and from the law department of the University of Mississippi at Oxford in 1909.

=== Early career ===
He was admitted to the bar in 1909 and commenced practice at Meadville, Mississippi. He also engaged in agricultural pursuits and banking. He served as member of the Mississippi State Senate from 1924 to 1928. He served in the Mississippi House of Representatives, representing Franklin County, from 1928 to 1932. He was again a member of the State Senate, from the 6th district, from 1932 to 1934.

=== Congress ===
McGehee was elected as a Democrat to the Seventy-fourth and to the five succeeding Congresses (January 3, 1935 – January 3, 1947). He served as chairman of the Committee on Claims (77th through 79th Congresses). He was an unsuccessful candidate for re-nomination in 1946 to the Eightieth Congress.

In his last term as a Congressman McGehee would become one of the first Congressional critics of the mid-century Supreme Court when he denounced the 1946 decision Morgan v. Virginia, which declared racial segregation on interstate transport unconstitutional. McGehee viewed the Justices as mediocre lawyers with little understanding of the Constitution, especially of states rights, and went so far as to argue that every Justice supporting Morgan needed to be impeached.

=== Personal life ===
McGeHee was the father of actress Gloria McGehee.

=== Later career and death ===
He resumed the practice of law, agricultural pursuits, and banking. He died in Meadville, Mississippi, February 9, 1962. He was interred in Midway Cemetery.

U.S. House of Representatives
Preceded by Lawrence Russell Ellzey	Member of the U.S. House of Representatives from Mississippi's 7th congressional district 1935–1947	Succeeded by John B. Williams
