= Leslie Biffle =

American former Secretary of Senate (1889–1966)

Leslie L. Biffle

15th & 17th Secretary of the United States Senate
- In office February 8, 1945 – January 4, 1947
- Leader: Alben W. Barkley
- Preceded by: Edwin A. Halsey
- Succeeded by: Carl A. Loeffler
- In office January 3, 1949 – January 3, 1953
- Leader: Scott W. Lucas
- Preceded by: Carl A. Loeffler
- Succeeded by: J. Mark Trice

Personal details
- Born: October 9, 1889 Boydsville, Clay County, Arkansas, U.S.
- Died: April 6, 1966 (aged 76) Washington, D.C., U.S.
- Party: Democratic
- Spouse: Mary Glade Strickling (m. 1921)
- Education: Business school (Little Rock, Arkansas)
- Occupation: Political operative; legislative administrator

Leslie L. Biffle (October 9, 1889 – April 6, 1966) was an American Democratic Party official who served as Secretary of the United States Senate from 1945 to 1947 and 1949 to 1953.

== Early life and career ==
Born in Boydsville, Clay County, Arkansas, Biffle grew up in Piggott, Arkansas, where his father, William B. Biffle, was a local Democratic Party official. After attending business school in Little Rock, he moved to Washington, D.C., in 1909 to work as secretary for U.S. Representative Robert B. Macon and later Senator James Paul Clarke. During World War I, he served as an auditor for the American Expeditionary Forces in France.

== Senate career ==
=== Democratic operative ===
In 1925, Biffle was appointed assistant secretary for Senate Democrats under Majority Leader Joseph T. Robinson, who advised him to "keep your eyes and ears open and your damn mouth shut". He became majority secretary in 1933, managing "pair votes" to pass New Deal legislation and forging alliances with senators like Harry S. Truman, whom he mentored upon Truman's Senate arrival in 1935.

=== Secretary of the Senate ===
Biffle was unanimously elected Secretary of the Senate in 1945, a rare bipartisan endorsement. His tenure coincided with Truman's presidency, and the two maintained a direct phone line between Biffle's office and the White House. His back office, dubbed "Biff's Diner," became a hub for senators and lobbyists seeking Truman's ear.

When Republicans regained the Senate in 1947, Biffle became executive director of the Democratic Policy Committee before resuming his secretary role in 1949.

=== 1948 election and later work ===
Biffle bolstered Truman’s underdog 1948 campaign by posing as a chicken farmer in a straw hat and truck to poll voters in the Midwest. His optimistic analysis proved accurate when Truman won re-election. Biffle retired in 1953 after Republicans regained the Senate but remained a consultant until his death in 1966.

== See also ==
- Secretary of the United States Senate
- Harry S. Truman
- Joseph T. Robinson
- Felix de Weldon
