= United States House Committee on the Election of the President, Vice President and Representatives in Congress =

The United States House Committee on the Election of the President, Vice President, and Representatives in Congress is a former standing committee of the United States House of Representatives.

The committee was established in 1893 with jurisdiction over legislation concerning the election of the officials enumerated in its title, including proposed changes to the Constitution that affected the terms of office of the named officials, the succession to the offices of the President and Vice President, the direct election of Senators, and the meeting times of Congress. The committee considered national election laws and their enforcement, including such topics as the disqualification of polygamists from election to Congress, the use of electric voting machines in congressional elections, the necessary and proper expenses related to nominations and elections, and the publication of campaign expenses. It was responsible for changes in the law regarding the electoral count and resolutions regulating the actual electoral vote count by the Senate and House of Representatives.

== See also ==
- Public Law 62-5 (1911), fixing the number of representatives at 435
- United States congressional committee
