= 1934 United States House of Representatives elections =

House elections for the 74th U.S. Congress

- November 6, 1934 (Note: Maine held its elections September 10, 1934.)

All 435 seats in the United States House of Representatives 218 seats needed for a majority
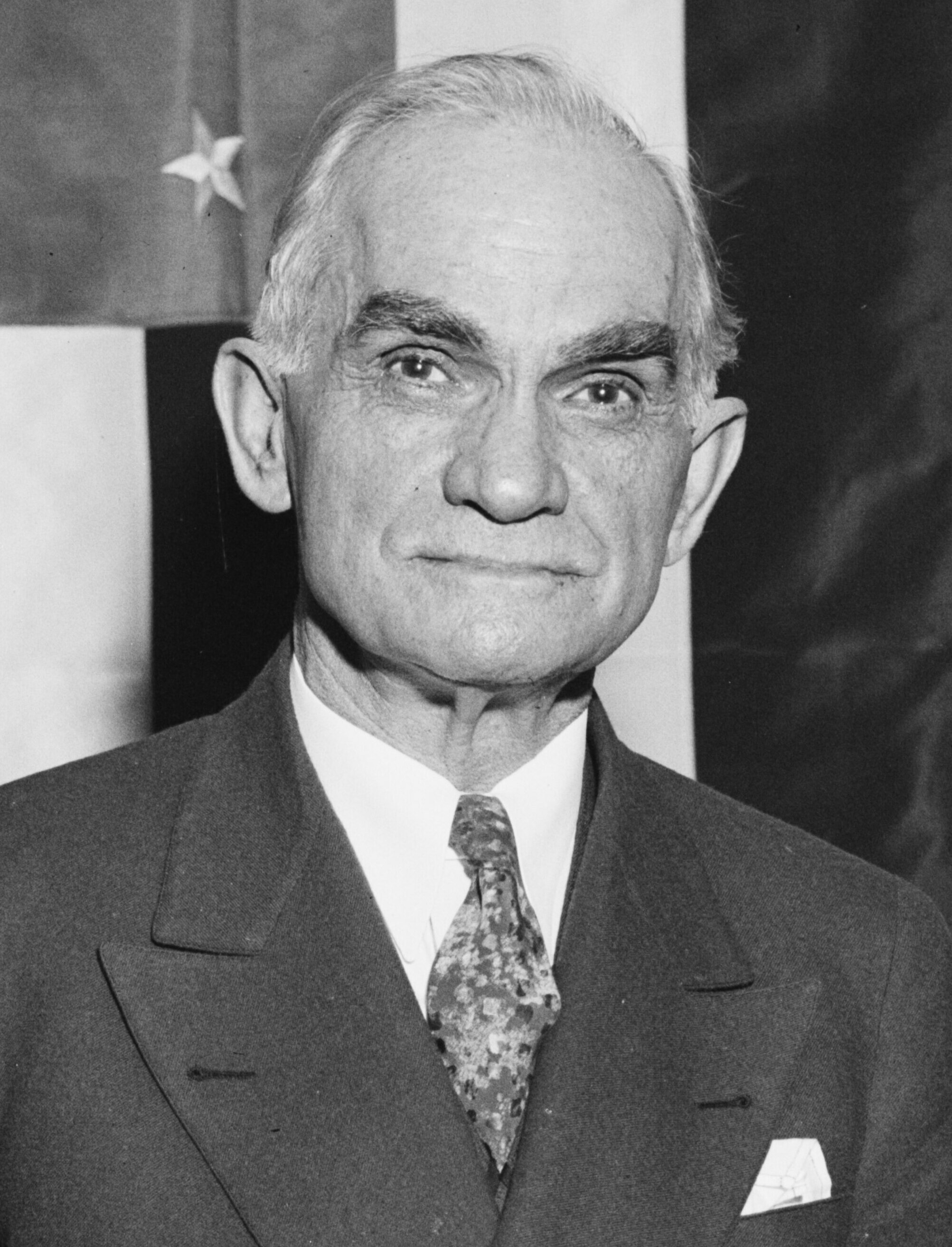

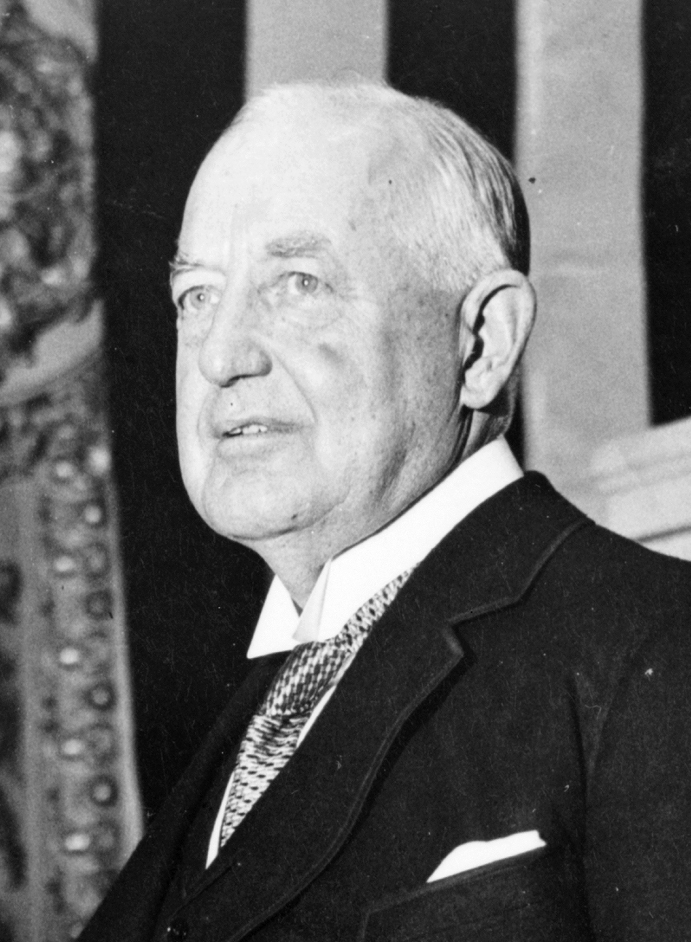
| | Majority party | Minority party |
|---|---|---|
| Leader | Jo Byrns | Bertrand Snell |
| Party | Democratic | Republican |
| Leader since | January 3, 1935 | March 4, 1931 |
| Leader's seat | Tennessee 5th | New York 31st |
| Last election | 313 seats | 117 seats |
| Seats won | 322 | 103 |
| Seat change | ▲9 | ▼14 |
| Popular vote | 17,542,400 | 13,434,477 |
| Percentage | 53.92% | 41.29% |
| Swing | ▼0.56pp | ▼0.79pp |
| | Third party | Fourth party |
| Party | Progressive | Farmer–Labor |
| Last election | 0 seats | 5 seats |
| Seats won | 7 | 3 |
| Seat change | ▲7 | ▼2 |
| Popular vote | 425,839 | 395,040 |
| Percentage | 1.31% | 1.21% |
| Swing | Pre-creation | ▲0.20pp |
- Results: Democratic gain Republican gain Democratic hold Republican hold Progressive gain Farmer–Labor gain Farmer–Labor hold
Speaker before election
Henry Rainey
Democratic
Elected Speaker
Jo Byrns
Democratic

The 1934 United States House of Representatives elections were elections for the United States House of Representatives to elect members to serve in the 74th United States Congress. They were held for the most part on November 6, 1934, while Maine held theirs on September 10. They occurred in the middle of President Franklin D. Roosevelt's first term. The Democratic Party continued its progress, gaining another 9 net seats from the opposition Republican Party, who also lost seats to the Progressive Party. The Republicans were reduced below one-fourth of the chamber for the first time since the creation of the party. The Wisconsin Progressive Party, a liberal group which allied with the Democrats, also became a force in Wisconsin politics.

The 1934 elections can be seen as a referendum on New Deal policies. While conservatives and people among the middle class who did not bear the brunt of the Great Depression saw the New Deal programs as radical, lower-income voters overwhelmingly voted in this election cycle to continue the implementation of Roosevelt's agenda. This election cycle marked the first time the president's party did not have a net loss of seats in either chamber of Congress in a midterm election, which would not be repeated until 1998 and 2002.

== Overall results ==
↓
| 322 | 3 | 7 | 103 |
| Democratic | FL | P | Republican |

Source: Election Statistics - Office of the Clerk

House seats
| Democratic | 74.02% |
| Farmer–Labor | 0.69% |
| Progressive | 1.61% |
| Republican | 23.68% |

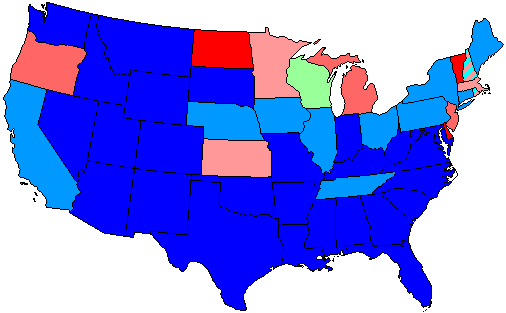
House seats by party holding plurality in state: 80%+ Democratic / / 80%+ Republican; 60%+ to 80% Democratic / 60%+ to 80% Progressive / 60%+ to 80% Republican; Up to 60% Democratic / / Up to 60% Republican

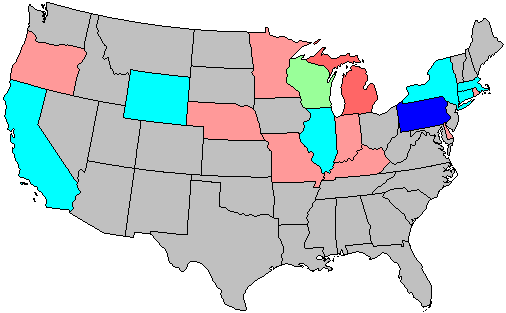
Net gains in seats: 6+ Democratic / / 6+ Republican; 3-5 Democratic / 3-5 Progressive / 3-5 Republican; 1-2 Democratic / / 1-2 Republican; no net change

Election results by winner's share of the vote

Popular vote and seat total in each state

== Special elections ==
There were four special elections in 1934 to the 73rd United States Congress.

Special elections are sorted by date then by district.

| District | Incumbent | | | This race | |
| District | Member | Party | First elected | Results | Candidates |
|---|---|---|---|---|---|
| Vermont at-large | Ernest W. Gibson | Republican | 1923 (special) | Incumbent resigned October 19, 1933 to become U.S. senator. New member elected January 16, 1934 and seated January 18, 1934. Republican hold. Winner was later re-elected; see below. | ▌ ✓ Charles A. Plumley (Republican) 58.04%; ▌Robert W. Ready (Democratic) 41.96% |
| New York 29 | James S. Parker | Republican | 1912 | Incumbent died December 19, 1933. New member elected January 30, 1934 and seated February 5, 1934. Republican hold. Winner was later re-elected; see below. | ▌ ✓ William D. Thomas (Republican) 60.14%; ▌John J. Nyhoff (Democratic) 38.49%; ▌Coleman B. Cheney (Socialist) 1.38% |
| Louisiana 6 | Bolivar E. Kemp | Democratic | 1924 | Incumbent died June 19, 1933. 1933 special election annulled January 29, 1934. New member elected May 1, 1934; Democratic hold. Winner was later re-elected; see below. | ▌ ✓ Jared Y. Sanders Jr. (Democratic); Unopposed |
| North Carolina 4 | Edward W. Pou | Democratic | 1900 | Incumbent died April 1, 1934. New member elected July 7, 1934 but not seated until the next term. Democratic hold. Winner was later re-elected; see below. | ▌ ✓ Harold D. Cooley (Democratic) 93.83%; ▌Hobart Brantley (Republican) 6.17% |

== Alabama ==
| District | Incumbent | | | This race | |
| District | Member | Party | First elected | Results | Candidates |
|---|---|---|---|---|---|
| Alabama 1 | John McDuffie | Democratic | 1918 | Incumbent re-elected. | ▌ ✓ John McDuffie (Democratic) 99.7%; ▌Andrew Forsman (Republican) 0.3% |
| Alabama 2 | J. Lister Hill | Democratic | 1923 (special) | Incumbent re-elected. | ▌ ✓ J. Lister Hill (Democratic) Uncontested |
| Alabama 3 | Henry B. Steagall | Democratic | 1914 | Incumbent re-elected. | ▌ ✓ Henry B. Steagall (Democratic) Uncontested |
| Alabama 4 | Lamar Jeffers | Democratic | 1921 (special) | Incumbent lost renomination. Democratic hold. | ▌ ✓ Sam Hobbs (Democratic) 87.6%; ▌Charles R. Robinson (Republican) 12.4% |
| Alabama 5 | Miles C. Allgood | Democratic | 1922 | Incumbent lost renomination. Democratic hold. | ▌ ✓ Joe Starnes (Democratic) 75.2%; ▌J. C. Swan (Republican) 24.8% |
| Alabama 6 | William B. Oliver | Democratic | 1914 | Incumbent re-elected. | ▌ ✓ William B. Oliver (Democratic) Uncontested |
| Alabama 7 | William B. Bankhead | Democratic | 1916 | Incumbent re-elected. | ▌ ✓ William B. Bankhead (Democratic) 80.4%; ▌J. W. Dodd (Independent) 19.6% |
| Alabama 8 | Archibald H. Carmichael | Democratic | 1933 (special) | Incumbent re-elected. | ▌ ✓ Archibald H. Carmichael (Democratic) Uncontested |
| Alabama 9 | George Huddleston | Democratic | 1914 | Incumbent re-elected. | ▌ ✓ George Huddleston (Democratic) 95.0%; ▌William Hugh McEniry (Republican) 4.1%; ▌William F. Spencer (Socialist) 0.9% |

== Arizona ==
Results by county Greenway: 50–60% 60–70% 70–80% 80–90%

| District | Incumbent | | | This race | |
| District | Member | Party | First elected | Results | Candidates |
|---|---|---|---|---|---|
| Arizona at-large | Isabella Greenway | Democratic | 1933 (special) | Incumbent re-elected. | ▌ ✓ Isabella Greenway (Democratic) 68.6%; ▌Hoval A. Smith (Republican) 29.4%; ▌Charles A. Preston (Socialist) 1.5%; ▌Martin Gehon (Communist) 0.4% |

== Arkansas ==
| District | Incumbent | | | This race | |
| District | Member | Party | First elected | Results | Candidates |
|---|---|---|---|---|---|
| Arkansas 1 | William J. Driver | Democratic | 1920 | Incumbent re-elected. | ▌ ✓ William J. Driver (Democratic) Uncontested |
| Arkansas 2 | John E. Miller | Democratic | 1930 | Incumbent re-elected. | ▌ ✓ John E. Miller (Democratic) Uncontested |
| Arkansas 3 | Claude Fuller | Democratic | 1928 | Incumbent re-elected. | ▌ ✓ Claude Fuller (Democratic) 63.1%; ▌Pat Murphy (Republican) 36.9% |
| Arkansas 4 | Ben Cravens | Democratic | 1932 | Incumbent re-elected. | ▌ ✓ Ben Cravens (Democratic) Uncontested |
| Arkansas 5 | David D. Terry | Democratic | 1933 (special) | Incumbent re-elected. | ▌ ✓ David D. Terry (Democratic) Uncontested |
| Arkansas 6 | D. D. Glover | Democratic | 1928 | Incumbent lost renomination. Democratic hold. | ▌ ✓ John L. McClellan (Democratic) Uncontested |
| Arkansas 7 | Tilman B. Parks | Democratic | 1920 | Incumbent re-elected. | ▌ ✓ Tilman B. Parks (Democratic) 95.7%; ▌Wade Kitchens (Independent) 4.3% |

== California ==
| District | Incumbent | | | This race | |
| District | Member | Party | First elected | Results | Candidates |
|---|---|---|---|---|---|
| California 1 | Clarence F. Lea | Democratic | 1916 | Incumbent re-elected. | ▌ ✓ Clarence F. Lea (Democratic) 93.6%; ▌Allen K. Gifford (Socialist) 6.4% |
| California 2 | Harry L. Englebright | Republican | 1926 | Incumbent re-elected. | ▌ ✓ Harry L. Englebright (Republican) Uncontested |
| California 3 | Frank H. Buck | Democratic | 1932 | Incumbent re-elected. | ▌ ✓ Frank H. Buck (Democratic) 53.3%; ▌J. M. Inman (Republican) 45.7%; ▌Albert Hougardy (Communist) 0.9% |
| California 4 | Florence Prag Kahn | Republican | 1925 (special) | Incumbent re-elected. | ▌ ✓ Florence Prag Kahn (Republican) 48.0%; ▌Chauncey Tramutolo (Democratic) 44.5%; ▌Raymond A. Burr (Progressive) 3.5%; ▌Samuel S. White (Socialist) 2.3%; ▌Minnie Carson (Communist) 1.7% |
| California 5 | Richard J. Welch | Republican | 1926 | Incumbent re-elected. | ▌ ✓ Richard J. Welch (Republican) 93.8%; ▌Alexander Noral (Communist) 6.2% |
| California 6 | Albert E. Carter | Republican | 1924 | Incumbent re-elected. | ▌ ✓ Albert E. Carter (Republican) Uncontested |
| California 7 | Ralph R. Eltse | Republican | 1932 | Incumbent lost re-election. Democratic gain. | ▌ ✓ John H. Tolan (Democratic) 52.3%; ▌Ralph R. Eltse (Republican) 47.7% |
| California 8 | John J. McGrath | Democratic | 1932 | Incumbent re-elected. | ▌ ✓ John J. McGrath (Democratic) Uncontested |
| California 9 | Denver S. Church | Democratic | 1932 | Incumbent retired. Republican gain. | ▌ ✓ Bertrand W. Gearhart (Republican) Uncontested |
| California 10 | Henry E. Stubbs | Democratic | 1932 | Incumbent re-elected. | ▌ ✓ Henry E. Stubbs (Democratic) 64.4%; ▌George R. Bliss (Republican) 35.6% |
| California 11 | William E. Evans | Republican | 1926 | Incumbent lost re-election. Democratic gain. | ▌ ✓ John S. McGroarty (Democratic) 53.5%; ▌William E. Evans (Republican) 45.0%; ▌William E. Stephenson (Socialist) 1.4% |
| California 12 | John H. Hoeppel | Democratic | 1932 | Incumbent re-elected. | ▌ ✓ John H. Hoeppel (Democratic) 50.7%; ▌Frederick F. Houser (Republican) 49.3% |
| California 13 | Charles Kramer | Democratic | 1932 | Incumbent re-elected. | ▌ ✓ Charles Kramer (Democratic) 62.5%; ▌Thomas K. Case (Republican) 21.0%; ▌Charles H. Randall (Progressive) 14.1%; ▌Michael S. Kerrigan (Socialist) 1.6%; ▌John J. Graham (Communist) 0.9% |
| California 14 | Thomas F. Ford | Democratic | 1932 | Incumbent re-elected. | ▌ ✓ Thomas F. Ford (Democratic) 57.7%; ▌William D. Campbell (Republican) 37.1%; ▌Lyndon R. Foster (Progressive) 2.7%; ▌Harry Sherr (Socialist) 1.2%; ▌Lawrence Ross (Communist) 1.2% |
| California 15 | William I. Traeger | Republican | 1932 | Incumbent lost re-election. Democratic gain. | ▌ ✓ John M. Costello (Democratic) 50.5%; ▌William I. Traeger (Republican) 49.5% |
| California 16 | John F. Dockweiler | Democratic | 1932 | Incumbent re-elected. | ▌ ✓ John F. Dockweiler (Democratic) Uncontested |
| California 17 | Charles J. Colden | Democratic | 1932 | Incumbent re-elected. | ▌ ✓ Charles J. Colden (Democratic) 70.4%; ▌C. P. Wright (Republican) 24.0%; ▌Richard Pomeroy (Socialist) 5.5% |
| California 18 | John H. Burke | Democratic | 1932 | Incumbent retired. Democratic hold. | ▌ ✓ Byron N. Scott (Democratic) 56.3%; ▌William Brayton (Republican) 43.2%; ▌Clyde Champion (Communist) 0.5% |
| California 19 | Sam L. Collins | Republican | 1932 | Incumbent re-elected. | ▌ ✓ Sam L. Collins (Republican) 88.8%; ▌A. B. Hillabold (Independent) 11.2% |
| California 20 | George Burnham | Republican | 1932 | Incumbent re-elected. | ▌ ✓ George Burnham (Republican) 52.4%; ▌Edward V. Izac (Democratic) 47.6% |

== Colorado ==
| District | Incumbent | | | This race | |
| District | Member | Party | First elected | Results | Candidates |
|---|---|---|---|---|---|
| Colorado 1 | Lawrence Lewis | Democratic | 1932 | Incumbent re-elected. | ▌ ✓ Lawrence Lewis (Democratic) 56.0%; ▌William R. Eaton (Republican) 32.0%; ▌Charles W. Varnum (Old Age Pension) 8.9%; ▌Carle Whitehead (Socialist) 2.4%; ▌George Bardwell (Communist) 0.7% |
| Colorado 2 | Fred N. Cummings | Democratic | 1932 | Incumbent re-elected. | ▌ ✓ Fred N. Cummings (Democratic) 55.9%; ▌George H. Bradfield (Republican) 42.4%; ▌George L. Slater (Socialist) 1.7% |
| Colorado 3 | John Andrew Martin | Democratic | 1932 | Incumbent re-elected. | ▌ ✓ John Andrew Martin (Democratic) 64.2%; ▌W. O. Peterson (Republican) 34.8%; ▌Joseph T. Landis (Socialist) 1.0% |
| Colorado 4 | Edward T. Taylor | Democratic | 1908 | Incumbent re-elected. | ▌ ✓ Edward T. Taylor (Democratic) 67.3%; ▌Harry McDevitt (Republican) 29.2%; ▌Gustavis A. Billstrom (Veterans) 2.8%; ▌O. W. Daggett (Independent) 0.8% |

== Connecticut ==
| District | Incumbent | | | This race | |
| District | Member | Party | First elected | Results | Candidates |
|---|---|---|---|---|---|
| Connecticut 1 | Herman P. Kopplemann | Democratic | 1932 | Incumbent re-elected. | ▌ ✓ Herman P. Kopplemann (Democratic) 54.5%; ▌Anson T. McCook (Republican) 43.2%; ▌Edward Heintz (Socialist) 2.1%; ▌George Hagerstrom (Communist) 0.3% |
| Connecticut 2 | William L. Higgins | Republican | 1932 | Incumbent re-elected. | ▌ ✓ William L. Higgins (Republican) 49.6%; ▌John M. Dowe (Democratic) 48.4%; ▌Arthur E. Oddie (Socialist) 1.5%; ▌Peter Larsen (Old Age Pension) 0.5% |
| Connecticut 3 | Francis T. Maloney | Democratic | 1932 | Retired to run for U.S. senator. Democratic hold. | ▌ ✓ James A. Shanley (Democratic) 48.8%; ▌Joseph F. Morrissey (Republican) 46.1%; ▌John J. Kennedy (Socialist) 4.8%; ▌William Secker (Communist) 0.2% |
| Connecticut 4 | Schuyler Merritt | Republican | 1932 | Incumbent re-elected. | ▌ ✓ Schuyler Merritt (Republican) 44.1%; ▌Edward T. Buckingham (Democratic) 37.3%; ▌Arnold E. Freese (Socialist) 17.1%; ▌Albert Levitt (Ind. Citizens) 1.1%; ▌Abraham M. Spivack (Communist) 0.3% |
| Connecticut 5 | Edward W. Goss | Republican | 1930 | Incumbent lost re-election. Democratic gain. | ▌ ✓ J. Joseph Smith (Democratic) 51.4%; ▌Edward W. Goss (Republican) 46.5%; ▌Paul O. Grossenbacher (Socialist) 1.8%; ▌Joseph W. Nygren (Ind. Citizens) 0.4% |
| Connecticut at-large | Charles M. Bakewell | Republican | 1932 | Incumbent lost re-election. Democratic gain. | ▌ ✓ William M. Citron (Democratic) 51.4%; ▌Charles M. Bakewell (Republican) 48.6% |

== Delaware ==
| District | Incumbent | | | This race | |
| District | Member | Party | First elected | Results | Candidates |
|---|---|---|---|---|---|
| Delaware at-large | Wilbur L. Adams | Democratic | 1932 | Retired to run for U. S. senator. Republican gain. | ▌ ✓ J. George Stewart (Republican) 53.1%; ▌John C. Hazzard (Democratic) 46.5%; ▌William A. Mayor (Socialist) 0.4%; ▌Joseph P. Daniels (Communist) 0.06% |

== Florida ==
| District | Incumbent | | | This race | |
| District | Member | Party | First elected | Results | Candidates |
|---|---|---|---|---|---|
| Florida 1 | J. Hardin Peterson | Democratic | 1932 | Incumbent re-elected. | ▌ ✓ J. Hardin Peterson (Democratic) Uncontested |
| Florida 2 | Robert A. Green | Democratic | 1932 | Incumbent re-elected. | ▌ ✓ Robert A. Green (Democratic) Uncontested |
| Florida 3 | Millard Caldwell | Democratic | 1932 | Incumbent re-elected. | ▌ ✓ Millard Caldwell (Democratic) Uncontested |
| Florida 4 | J. Mark Wilcox | Democratic | 1932 | Incumbent re-elected. | ▌ ✓ J. Mark Wilcox (Democratic) Uncontested |
| Florida at-large | William J. Sears | Democratic | 1932 | Incumbent re-elected. | ▌ ✓ William J. Sears (Democratic) Uncontested |

== Georgia ==
| District | Incumbent | | | This race | |
| District | Member | Party | First elected | Results | Candidates |
|---|---|---|---|---|---|
| Georgia 1 | Homer C. Parker | Democratic | 1931 (special) | Incumbent lost renomination. Democratic hold. | ▌ ✓ Hugh Peterson (Democratic) Uncontested |
| Georgia 2 | Edward E. Cox | Democratic | 1924 | Incumbent re-elected. | ▌ ✓ Edward E. Cox (Democratic) Uncontested |
| Georgia 3 | Bryant T. Castellow | Democratic | 1932 | Incumbent re-elected. | ▌ ✓ Bryant T. Castellow (Democratic) Uncontested |
| Georgia 4 | Emmett Marshall Owen | Democratic | 1932 | Incumbent re-elected. | ▌ ✓ Emmett Marshall Owen (Democratic) 95.5%; ▌B. W. Middlebrooks (Independent) 4.5% |
| Georgia 5 | Robert Ramspeck | Democratic | 1929 (special) | Incumbent re-elected. | ▌ ✓ Robert Ramspeck (Democratic) Uncontested |
| Georgia 6 | Carl Vinson | Democratic | 1914 | Incumbent re-elected. | ▌ ✓ Carl Vinson (Democratic) Uncontested |
| Georgia 7 | Malcolm C. Tarver | Democratic | 1926 | Incumbent re-elected. | ▌ ✓ Malcolm C. Tarver (Democratic) Uncontested |
| Georgia 8 | Braswell Deen | Democratic | 1932 | Incumbent re-elected. | ▌ ✓ Braswell Deen (Democratic) Uncontested |
| Georgia 9 | John S. Wood | Democratic | 1930 | Incumbent lost renomination. Democratic hold. | ▌ ✓ B. Frank Whelchel (Democratic) Uncontested |
| Georgia 10 | Paul Brown | Democratic | 1933 (special) | Incumbent re-elected. | ▌ ✓ Paul Brown (Democratic) Uncontested |

== Idaho ==
| District | Incumbent | | | This race | |
| District | Member | Party | First elected | Results | Candidates |
|---|---|---|---|---|---|
| Idaho 1 | Compton I. White | Democratic | 1932 | Incumbent re-elected. | ▌ ✓ Compton I. White (Democratic) 62.0%; ▌Burton L. French (Republican) 38.0% |
| Idaho 2 | Thomas C. Coffin | Democratic | 1932 | Incumbent died. Democratic hold. | ▌ ✓ D. Worth Clark (Democratic) 60.7%; ▌Heber Q. Hale (Republican) 39.3% |

== Illinois ==
| District | Incumbent | | | This race | |
| District | Member | Party | First elected | Results | Candidates |
|---|---|---|---|---|---|
| Illinois 1 | Oscar Stanton De Priest | Republican | 1928 | Incumbent lost re-election. Democratic gain. | ▌ ✓ Arthur W. Mitchell (Democratic) 53.0%; ▌Oscar Stanton De Priest (Republican) 47.0% |
| Illinois 2 | P. H. Moynihan | Republican | 1932 | Incumbent lost re-election. Democratic gain. | ▌ ✓ Raymond S. McKeough (Democratic) 56.3%; ▌P. H. Moynihan (Republican) 43.7% |
| Illinois 3 | Edward A. Kelly | Democratic | 1930 | Incumbent re-elected. | ▌ ✓ Edward A. Kelly (Democratic) 63.5%; ▌Frank M. Fulton (Republican) 36.5% |
| Illinois 4 | Harry P. Beam | Democratic | 1930 | Incumbent re-elected. | ▌ ✓ Harry P. Beam (Democratic) 78.8%; ▌Frank George Zelezinski (Republican) 21.2% |
| Illinois 5 | Adolph J. Sabath | Democratic | 1906 | Incumbent re-elected. | ▌ ✓ Adolph J. Sabath (Democratic) 72.5%; ▌John A. Stanek (Republican) 27.2%; ▌Laura Osby (Communist) 0.4% |
| Illinois 6 | Thomas J. O'Brien | Democratic | 1932 | Incumbent re-elected. | ▌ ✓ Thomas J. O'Brien (Democratic) 65.7%; ▌Arnold L. Lund (Republican) 34.3% |
| Illinois 7 | Leonard W. Schuetz | Democratic | 1930 | Incumbent re-elected. | ▌ ✓ Leonard W. Schuetz (Democratic) 64.0%; ▌Raymond J. Peacock (Republican) 35.9%; ▌Sigurd H. Ohtness (Prohibition) 0.2% |
| Illinois 8 | Leo Kocialkowski | Democratic | 1932 | Incumbent re-elected. | ▌ ✓ Leo Kocialkowski (Democratic) 74.1%; ▌Edward Richard Piszatowski (Republican) 25.9% |
| Illinois 9 | Frederick A. Britten | Republican | 1912 | Incumbent lost re-election. Democratic gain. | ▌ ✓ James McAndrews (Democratic) 56.3%; ▌Frederick A. Britten (Republican) 43.7% |
| Illinois 10 | James Simpson Jr. | Republican | 1932 | Incumbent lost renomination. Republican hold. | ▌ ✓ Ralph E. Church (Republican) 51.3%; ▌David B. Maloney (Democratic) 48.7% |
| Illinois 11 | Frank R. Reid | Republican | 1922 | Incumbent retired. Republican hold. | ▌ ✓ Chauncey W. Reed (Republican) 50.3%; ▌James A. Howell (Democratic) 49.7% |
| Illinois 12 | John T. Buckbee | Republican | 1926 | Incumbent re-elected. | ▌ ✓ John T. Buckbee (Republican) 55.3%; ▌C. H. Smith (Democratic) 44.7% |
| Illinois 13 | Leo E. Allen | Republican | 1932 | Incumbent re-elected. | ▌ ✓ Leo E. Allen (Republican) 60.5%; ▌Edward S. Nichols (Democratic) 39.5% |
| Illinois 14 | Chester Thompson | Democratic | 1932 | Incumbent re-elected. | ▌ ✓ Chester Thompson (Democratic) 53.3%; ▌John Clayton Allen (Republican) 46.7% |
| Illinois 15 | J. Leroy Adair | Democratic | 1932 | Incumbent re-elected. | ▌ ✓ J. Leroy Adair (Democratic) 54.9%; ▌Burnett M. Chiperfield (Republican) 45.1% |
| Illinois 16 | Everett Dirksen | Republican | 1932 | Incumbent re-elected. | ▌ ✓ Everett Dirksen (Republican) 65.4%; ▌Rayburn L. Russell (Democratic) 34.6% |
| Illinois 17 | Frank Gillespie | Democratic | 1932 | Incumbent lost re-election. Republican gain. | ▌ ✓ Leslie C. Arends (Republican) 52.1%; ▌Frank Gillespie (Democratic) 47.9% |
| Illinois 18 | James A. Meeks | Democratic | 1932 | Incumbent re-elected. | ▌ ✓ James A. Meeks (Democratic) 52.0%; ▌Elmer A. Taylor (Republican) 47.6%; ▌John L. Guingrich (Prohibition) 0.4% |
| Illinois 19 | Donald C. Dobbins | Democratic | 1932 | Incumbent re-elected. | ▌ ✓ Donald C. Dobbins (Democratic) 53.9%; ▌Charles H. Fletcher (Republican) 46.1% |
| Illinois 20 | Henry T. Rainey | Democratic | 1922 | Incumbent died. Democratic hold. | ▌ ✓ Scott W. Lucas (Democratic) 56.9%; ▌Warren E. Wright (Republican) 43.1% |
| Illinois 21 | J. Earl Major | Democratic | 1930 | Resigned October 6, 1933 to become U.S. District Judge. Democratic hold. | ▌ ✓ Harry H. Mason (Democratic) 51.0%; ▌Frank M. Ramey (Republican) 48.4%; ▌Douglas B. Anderson (Independent) 0.6% |
| Illinois 22 | Edwin M. Schaefer | Democratic | 1932 | Incumbent re-elected. | ▌ ✓ Edwin M. Schaefer (Democratic) 56.3%; ▌Jesse R. Brown (Republican) 43.7% |
| Illinois 23 | William W. Arnold | Democratic | 1922 | Incumbent re-elected. | ▌ ✓ William W. Arnold (Democratic) 55.5%; ▌Ben O. Sumner (Republican) 44.5% |
| Illinois 24 | Claude V. Parsons | Democratic | 1930 | Incumbent re-elected. | ▌ ✓ Claude V. Parsons (Democratic) 51.7%; ▌James V. Heidinger (Republican) 48.3% |
| Illinois 25 | Kent E. Keller | Democratic | 1930 | Incumbent re-elected. | ▌ ✓ Kent E. Keller (Democratic) 54.8%; ▌J. Lester Buford (Republican) 45.2% |
| Illinois at-large | Martin A. Brennan | Democratic | 1932 | Incumbent re-elected. | ▌ ✓ Michael L. Igoe (Democratic) 28.2%; ▌ ✓ Martin A. Brennan (Democratic) 27.3%; ▌C. Wayland Brooks (Republican) 22.4%; ▌Milton E. Jones (Republican) 20.8%; ▌Walter Nesbit (Progressive) 0.4%; ▌Harold O. Hatcher (Socialist) 0.3%; ▌Arthur McDowell (Socialist) 0.3%; ▌Martin Powroznik (Progressive) 0.1%; ▌Frank Earl Herrick (Prohibition) 0.09%; ▌Clay F. Gaumer (Prohibition) 0.09%; ▌John L. Lindsey (Socialist Labor) 0.06%; ▌Frank Schnur (Socialist Labor) 0.06%; ▌Karl Lockner (Independent) 0.001%; ▌Laverne Pruett (Independent) 0.000% |
| Illinois at-large | Walter Nesbit | Democratic | 1932 | Incumbent lost renomination. Democratic hold. | |

== Indiana ==
| District | Incumbent | | | This race | |
| District | Member | Party | First elected | Results | Candidates |
|---|---|---|---|---|---|
| Indiana 1 | William T. Schulte | Democratic | 1932 | Incumbent re-elected. | ▌ ✓ William T. Schulte (Democratic) 53.5%; ▌E. Miles Norton (Republican) 45.9%; ▌Harry O. Stevens (Socialist) 0.6% |
| Indiana 2 | George R. Durgan | Democratic | 1932 | Incumbent lost re-election. Republican gain. | ▌ ✓ Frederick Landis (Republican) 53.9%; ▌George R. Durgan (Democratic) 45.8%; ▌William Earl Ross (Socialist) 0.4% |
| Indiana 3 | Samuel B. Pettengill | Democratic | 1930 | Incumbent re-elected. | ▌ ✓ Samuel B. Pettengill (Democratic) 50.7%; ▌Andrew J. Hickey (Republican) 48.1%; ▌Fred M. Eby (Socialist) 1.0%; ▌William Brandon (Prohibition) 0.2% |
| Indiana 4 | James I. Farley | Democratic | 1932 | Incumbent re-elected. | ▌ ✓ James I. Farley (Democratic) 51.7%; ▌David Hogg (Republican) 48.1%; ▌John S. Patee (Socialist) 0.2% |
| Indiana 5 | Glenn Griswold | Democratic | 1930 | Incumbent re-elected. | ▌ ✓ Glenn Griswold (Democratic) 54.1%; ▌Albert R. Hall (Republican) 44.8%; ▌Jacob Mueller (Democratic) 0.6%; ▌George Schafer (Prohibition) 0.5% |
| Indiana 6 | Virginia E. Jenckes | Democratic | 1932 | Incumbent re-elected. | ▌ ✓ Virginia E. Jenckes (Democratic) 49.8%; ▌Fred S. Purnell (Republican) 49.5%; ▌Jess O. Herbert (Socialist) 0.6% |
| Indiana 7 | Arthur H. Greenwood | Democratic | 1922 | Incumbent re-elected. | ▌ ✓ Arthur H. Greenwood (Democratic) 51.5%; ▌Gerald W. Landis (Republican) 47.7%; ▌George I. Houser (Socialist) 0.8% |
| Indiana 8 | John W. Boehne Jr. | Democratic | 1930 | Incumbent re-elected. | ▌ ✓ John W. Boehne Jr. (Democratic) 56.9%; ▌Charles F. Werner (Republican) 42.7%; ▌Peter Shaffer (Socialist) 0.4% |
| Indiana 9 | Eugene B. Crowe | Democratic | 1930 | Incumbent re-elected. | ▌ ✓ Eugene B. Crowe (Democratic) 52.1%; ▌Chester A. Davis (Republican) 47.6%; ▌George W. Reider (Socialist) 0.3% |
| Indiana 10 | Finly Hutchinson Gray | Democratic | 1932 | Incumbent re-elected. | ▌ ✓ Finly Hutchinson Gray (Democratic) 51.5%; ▌Robert F. Murray (Republican) 48.1%; ▌Eugene S. Lewis (Prohibition) 0.3%; ▌Max Mathews (Socialist) 0.2% |
| Indiana 11 | William H. Larrabee | Democratic | 1930 | Incumbent re-elected. | ▌ ✓ William H. Larrabee (Democratic) 54.4%; ▌Ralph A. Scott (Republican) 44.5%; ▌Henry L. Newlund (Socialist) 0.8%; ▌Ross L. Davis (Prohibition) 0.2%; ▌Miles Blansett (Communist) 0.04% |
| Indiana 12 | Louis Ludlow | Democratic | 1928 | Incumbent re-elected. | ▌ ✓ Louis Ludlow (Democratic) 55.6%; ▌Delbert O. Wilmeth (Republican) 43.4%; ▌Wilmert B. Schreiber (Socialist) 0.9%; ▌Elmer Stoddard (Prohibition) 0.1% |

== Iowa ==
| District | Incumbent | | | This race | |
| District | Member | Party | First elected | Results | Candidates |
|---|---|---|---|---|---|
| Iowa 1 | Edward C. Eicher | Democratic | 1932 | Incumbent re-elected. | ▌ ✓ Edward C. Eicher (Democratic) 55.1%; ▌E. R. Hicklin (Republican) 44.3%; ▌Leo P. Burke (Farmer–Labor) 0.6% |
| Iowa 2 | Bernhard M. Jacobsen | Democratic | 1930 | Incumbent re-elected. | ▌ ✓ Bernhard M. Jacobsen (Democratic) 63.0%; ▌Martin B. Andelfinger (Republican) 35.5%; ▌George F. Buresch (Farmer–Labor) 1.6% |
| Iowa 3 | Albert C. Willford | Democratic | 1932 | Incumbent lost re-election. Republican gain. | ▌ ✓ John W. Gwynne (Republican) 51.0%; ▌Albert C. Willford (Democratic) 42.6%; ▌John F. Wirds (Farmer–Labor) 6.4% |
| Iowa 4 | Fred Biermann | Democratic | 1932 | Incumbent re-elected. | ▌ ✓ Fred Biermann (Democratic) 52.1%; ▌C. A. Benson (Republican) 46.1%; ▌Wallace Sumner (Farmer–Labor) 1.8% |
| Iowa 5 | Lloyd Thurston | Republican | 1924 | Incumbent re-elected. | ▌ ✓ Lloyd Thurston (Republican) 52.3%; ▌Ernest H. Fabritz (Democratic) 46.8%; ▌John C. Gibbs (Farmer–Labor) 0.6%; ▌Latitia M. Conard (Socialist) 0.3% |
| Iowa 6 | Cassius C. Dowell | Republican | 1914 | Incumbent lost re-election. Democratic gain. | ▌ ✓ Hubert Utterback (Democratic) 52.1%; ▌Cassius C. Dowell (Republican) 47.2%; ▌I. T. Jones (Farmer–Labor) 0.5%; ▌H. G. Altenberger (Socialist) 0.2% |
| Iowa 7 | Otha Wearin | Democratic | 1932 | Incumbent re-elected. | ▌ ✓ Otha Wearin (Democratic) 52.0%; ▌Charles Edward Swanson (Republican) 48.0% |
| Iowa 8 | Fred C. Gilchrist | Republican | 1930 | Incumbent re-elected. | ▌ ✓ Fred C. Gilchrist (Republican) 52.4%; ▌Joseph J. Myers (Democratic) 46.2%; ▌C. M. Church (Farmer–Labor) 1.4% |
| Iowa 9 | Guy Gillette | Democratic | 1932 | Incumbent re-elected. | ▌ ✓ Guy Gillette (Democratic) 61.3%; ▌Thomas H. McBride (Republican) 34.1%; ▌A. I. Birch (Farmer–Labor) 4.6% |

== Kansas ==
| District | Incumbent | | | This race | |
| District | Member | Party | First elected | Results | Candidates |
|---|---|---|---|---|---|
| Kansas 1 | William P. Lambertson | Republican | 1928 | Incumbent re-elected. | ▌ ✓ William P. Lambertson (Republican) 60.5%; ▌John H. Arnett (Democratic) 39.5% |
| Kansas 2 | Ulysses Samuel Guyer | Republican | 1926 | Incumbent re-elected. | ▌ ✓ Ulysses Samuel Guyer (Republican) 49.7%; ▌Howard E. Payne (Democratic) 49.1%; ▌Arthur Roberts (Socialist) 1.2% |
| Kansas 3 | Harold C. McGugin | Republican | 1930 | Incumbent lost re-election. Democratic gain. | ▌ ✓ Edward White Patterson (Democratic) 50.0%; ▌Harold C. McGugin (Republican) 48.0%; ▌C. S. Bendure (Socialist) 2.0% |
| Kansas 4 | Randolph Carpenter | Democratic | 1932 | Incumbent re-elected. | ▌ ✓ Randolph Carpenter (Democratic) 52.6%; ▌Hal E. Harlan (Republican) 47.4% |
| Kansas 5 | William Augustus Ayres | Democratic | 1922 | Resigned when appointed to the FTC. Democratic hold. | ▌ ✓ John Mills Houston (Democratic) 57.1%; ▌Ira C. Watson (Republican) 36.2%; ▌C. F. Whitson (Independent) 5.4%; ▌Barney C. McCartney (Socialist) 1.3% |
| Kansas 6 | Kathryn O'Loughlin McCarthy | Democratic | 1932 | Incumbent lost re-election. Republican gain. | ▌ ✓ Frank Carlson (Republican) 51.1%; ▌Kathryn O'Loughlin McCarthy (Democratic) 48.9% |
| Kansas 7 | Clifford R. Hope | Republican | 1926 | Incumbent re-elected. | ▌ ✓ Clifford R. Hope (Republican) 54.6%; ▌L. E. Webb (Democratic) 45.4% |

== Kentucky ==
| District | Incumbent | | | This race | |
| District | Member | Party | First elected | Results | Candidates |
|---|---|---|---|---|---|
| Kentucky 1 | William Voris Gregory; Redistricted from the at-large district | Democratic | 1926 | Incumbent re-elected. | ▌ ✓ William Voris Gregory (Democratic) 61.1%; ▌John W. Taylor (Republican) 38.9% |
| Kentucky 2 | Glover H. Cary; Redistricted from the at-large district | Democratic | 1930 | Incumbent re-elected. | ▌ ✓ Glover H. Cary (Democratic) 75.1%; ▌William M. Likens (Prohibition) 21.2%; ▌W. A. Sandefur (Socialist) 3.8% |
| Kentucky 3 | John Y. Brown Sr. Redistricted from the at-large district | Democratic | 1932 | Incumbent lost renomination. Democratic hold. | ▌ ✓ Emmet O'Neal (Democratic) 56.2%; ▌Frank M. Drake (Republican) 42.6%; ▌Peter J. Gnau (Independent) 0.5%; ▌Clell G. Fowler (Socialist) 0.5%; ▌William H. Brann (Socialist Labor) 0.2%; ▌J. Stuart McIntyre (Communist) 0.04% |
| Kentucky 4 | Cap R. Carden; Redistricted from the at-large district | Democratic | 1930 | Incumbent re-elected. | ▌ ✓ Cap R. Carden (Democratic) 52.1%; ▌James Tudor (Republican) 47.9% |
| Kentucky 5 | Brent Spence; Redistricted from the at-large district | Democratic | 1930 | Incumbent re-elected. | ▌ ✓ Brent Spence (Democratic) 65.1%; ▌J. Lincoln Newhall (Republican) 30.6%; ▌John J. Thobe (Independent) 4.3% |
| Kentucky 6 | Virgil Chapman; Redistricted from the at-large district | Democratic | 1930 | Incumbent re-elected. | ▌ ✓ Virgil Chapman (Democratic) 60.0%; ▌W. D. Rodgers (Republican) 40.0% |
| Kentucky 7 | Andrew J. May; Redistricted from the at-large district | Democratic | 1930 | Incumbent re-elected. | ▌ ✓ Andrew J. May (Democratic) 52.8%; ▌Harry H. Ramey (Republican) 47.2% |
| Kentucky 8 | Fred M. Vinson; Redistricted from the at-large district | Democratic | 1930 | Incumbent re-elected. | ▌ ✓ Fred M. Vinson (Democratic) 59.2%; ▌George P. Ellison (Republican) 40.8% |
| Kentucky 9 | Finley Hamilton; Redistricted from the at-large district | Democratic | 1932 | Incumbent retired. Republican gain. | ▌ ✓ John M. Robsion (Republican) 77.0%; ▌L. L. Terrell (Democratic) 23.0% |

== Louisiana ==
| District | Incumbent | | | This race | |
| District | Member | Party | First elected | Results | Candidates |
|---|---|---|---|---|---|
| Louisiana 1 | Joachim O. Fernández | Democratic | 1930 | Incumbent re-elected. | ▌ ✓ Joachim O. Fernández (Democratic) Uncontested |
| Louisiana 2 | Paul H. Maloney | Democratic | 1930 | Incumbent re-elected. | ▌ ✓ Paul H. Maloney (Democratic) Uncontested |
| Louisiana 3 | Numa F. Montet | Democratic | 1929 (special) | Incumbent re-elected. | ▌ ✓ Numa F. Montet (Democratic) Uncontested |
| Louisiana 4 | John N. Sandlin | Democratic | 1920 | Incumbent re-elected. | ▌ ✓ John N. Sandlin (Democratic) Uncontested |
| Louisiana 5 | Riley J. Wilson | Democratic | 1914 | Incumbent re-elected. | ▌ ✓ Riley J. Wilson (Democratic) Uncontested |
| Louisiana 6 | Jared Y. Sanders Jr. | Democratic | 1934 (special) | Incumbent re-elected. | ▌ ✓ Jared Y. Sanders Jr. (Democratic) Uncontested |
| Louisiana 7 | René L. De Rouen | Democratic | 1927 (special) | Incumbent re-elected. | ▌ ✓ René L. De Rouen (Democratic) Uncontested |
| Louisiana 8 | Cleveland Dear | Democratic | 1932 | Incumbent re-elected. | ▌ ✓ Cleveland Dear (Democratic) Uncontested |

== Maine ==
| District | Incumbent | | | This race | |
| District | Member | Party | First elected | Results | Candidates |
|---|---|---|---|---|---|
| Maine 1 | Carroll L. Beedy | Republican | 1920 | Incumbent lost re-election. Democratic gain. | ▌ ✓ Simon M. Hamlin (Democratic) 50.8%; ▌Carroll L. Beedy (Republican) 49.2% |
| Maine 2 | Edward C. Moran Jr. | Democratic | 1932 | Incumbent re-elected. | ▌ ✓ Edward C. Moran Jr. (Democratic) 53.2%; ▌Zelma M. Dwinal (Republican) 46.8% |
| Maine 3 | John G. Utterback | Democratic | 1932 | Incumbent lost re-election. Republican gain. | ▌ ✓ Owen Brewster (Republican) 51.3%; ▌John G. Utterback (Democratic) 48.7% |

== Maryland ==
| District | Incumbent | | | This race | |
| District | Member | Party | First elected | Results | Candidates |
|---|---|---|---|---|---|
| Maryland 1 | T. Alan Goldsborough | Democratic | 1920 | Incumbent re-elected. | ▌ ✓ T. Alan Goldsborough (Democratic) 64.0%; ▌H. Burdett Messenger (Republican) 36.0% |
| Maryland 2 | William P. Cole Jr. | Democratic | 1930 | Incumbent re-elected. | ▌ ✓ William P. Cole Jr. (Democratic) 57.7%; ▌Theodore F. Brown (Republican) 39.3%; ▌Edgar R. McShane (Independent) 1.6%; ▌Oswald S. Hunt (Socialist) 1.4% |
| Maryland 3 | Vincent L. Palmisano | Democratic | 1926 | Incumbent re-elected. | ▌ ✓ Vincent L. Palmisano (Democratic) 66.4%; ▌F. Stanley Porter (Republican) 30.9%; ▌Samuel M. Neistadt (Socialist) 2.7% |
| Maryland 4 | Ambrose Jerome Kennedy | Democratic | 1932 | Incumbent re-elected. | ▌ ✓ Ambrose Jerome Kennedy (Democratic) 59.1%; ▌William J. Stocksdale (Republican) 38.6%; ▌Naomi Riches (Socialist) 2.3% |
| Maryland 5 | Stephen W. Gambrill | Democratic | 1924 | Incumbent re-elected. | ▌ ✓ Stephen W. Gambrill (Democratic) 61.4%; ▌Joseph Allison Wilmer (Republican) 37.6%; ▌Samuel R. Angel (Socialist) 1.0% |
| Maryland 6 | David J. Lewis | Democratic | 1930 | Incumbent re-elected. | ▌ ✓ David J. Lewis (Democratic) 50.3%; ▌Frederick N. Zihlman (Republican) 48.8%; ▌Merl Claude Boyer (Socialist) 0.9% |

== Massachusetts ==
| District | Incumbent | | | This race | |
| District | Member | Party | First elected | Results | Candidates |
|---|---|---|---|---|---|
| Massachusetts 1 | Allen T. Treadway | Republican | 1912 | Incumbent re-elected. | ▌ ✓ Allen T. Treadway (Republican) 57.6%; ▌George E. Haggerty (Democratic) 39.6%; ▌Charles H. Daniels (Socialist) 2.9% |
| Massachusetts 2 | William J. Granfield | Democratic | 1930 | Incumbent re-elected. | ▌ ✓ William J. Granfield (Democratic) 51.2%; ▌Charles R. Clason (Republican) 45.5%; ▌S. Ralph Harlow (Socialist) 3.3% |
| Massachusetts 3 | Frank H. Foss | Republican | 1924 | Incumbent lost re-election. Democratic gain. | ▌ ✓ Joseph E. Casey (Democratic) 50.1%; ▌Frank H. Foss (Republican) 49.9% |
| Massachusetts 4 | Pehr G. Holmes | Republican | 1930 | Incumbent re-elected. | ▌ ✓ Pehr G. Holmes (Republican) 57.4%; ▌James H. Ferguson (Democratic) 41.0%; ▌William A. Ahern (Socialist) 1.5% |
| Massachusetts 5 | Edith Nourse Rogers | Republican | 1925 (special) | Incumbent re-elected. | ▌ ✓ Edith Nourse Rogers (Republican) 62.2%; ▌Jeremiah J. O'Sullivan (Democratic) 37.8% |
| Massachusetts 6 | A. Piatt Andrew | Republican | 1921 (special) | Incumbent re-elected. | ▌ ✓ A. Piatt Andrew (Republican) Uncontested |
| Massachusetts 7 | William P. Connery Jr. | Democratic | 1922 | Incumbent re-elected. | ▌ ✓ William P. Connery Jr. (Democratic) 59.0%; ▌C. F. Nelson Pratt (Republican) 38.6%; ▌Joseph F. Massidda (Socialist) 1.5%; ▌Joseph Leedes (Communist) 0.8% |
| Massachusetts 8 | Arthur D. Healey | Democratic | 1932 | Incumbent re-elected. | ▌ ✓ Arthur D. Healey (Democratic) 58.6%; ▌William S. Howe (Republican) 41.4% |
| Massachusetts 9 | Robert Luce | Republican | 1918 | Incumbent lost re-election. Democratic gain. | ▌ ✓ Richard M. Russell (Democratic) 52.6%; ▌Robert Luce (Republican) 47.4% |
| Massachusetts 10 | George H. Tinkham | Republican | 1914 | Incumbent re-elected. | ▌ ✓ George H. Tinkham (Republican) Uncontested |
| Massachusetts 11 | John J. Douglass | Democratic | 1924 | Incumbent lost renomination. Democratic hold. | ▌ ✓ John Patrick Higgins (Democratic) Uncontested |
| Massachusetts 12 | John W. McCormack | Democratic | 1928 | Incumbent re-elected. | ▌ ✓ John W. McCormack (Democratic) 82.8%; ▌Francis A. Pentoney (Republican) 17.2% |
| Massachusetts 13 | Richard B. Wigglesworth | Republican | 1928 | Incumbent re-elected. | ▌ ✓ Richard B. Wigglesworth (Republican) 54.5%; ▌Francis H. Foy (Democratic) 45.5% |
| Massachusetts 14 | Joseph W. Martin Jr. | Republican | 1924 | Incumbent re-elected. | ▌ ✓ Joseph W. Martin Jr. (Republican) 54.8%; ▌Arthur E. Seagrave (Democratic) 45.2% |
| Massachusetts 15 | Charles L. Gifford | Republican | 1922 | Incumbent re-elected. | ▌ ✓ Charles L. Gifford (Republican) 53.3%; ▌John D. W. Bodfish (Democratic) 44.0%; ▌Glen Trimble (Socialist) 2.6% |

== Michigan ==
| District | Incumbent | | | This race | |
| District | Member | Party | First elected | Results | Candidates |
|---|---|---|---|---|---|
| Michigan 1 | George G. Sadowski | Democratic | 1932 | Incumbent re-elected. | ▌ ✓ George G. Sadowski (Democratic) 65.8%; ▌Charles A. Roxborough (Republican) 31.5%; ▌Frank Sykes (Independent) 1.4%; ▌Alex Levitt (Socialist) 1.1%; ▌Cassimer Hajduk (Independent) 0.2% |
| Michigan 2 | John C. Lehr | Democratic | 1932 | Incumbent lost re-election. Republican gain. | ▌ ✓ Earl C. Michener (Republican) 50.2%; ▌John C. Lehr (Democratic) 48.7%; ▌H. J. McFarlan (Socialist) 0.6%; ▌Bert H. Smith (Farmer–Labor) 0.3%; ▌Ellsworth Allen (Commonwealth) 0.1%; ▌Harold Franklin (Communist) 0.05%; ▌Cecil R. Irelan (Socialist Labor) 0.04% |
| Michigan 3 | Joseph L. Hooper | Republican | 1925 (special) | Incumbent died. Republican hold. | ▌ ✓ Henry M. Kimball (Republican) 55.0%; ▌Paul H. Todd (Democratic) 43.6%; ▌Charles L. Williams (Socialist) 1.3%; ▌E. G. Keifer (Farmer–Labor) 0.1% |
| Michigan 4 | George Ernest Foulkes | Democratic | 1932 | Incumbent lost re-election. Republican gain. | ▌ ✓ Clare E. Hoffman (Republican) 58.2%; ▌George Ernest Foulkes (Democratic) 40.7%; ▌E. F. Strickland (Socialist) 0.6%; ▌Felix A. Racette (Progressive) 0.5%; ▌Frank E. Bennett (Farmer–Labor) 0.02% |
| Michigan 5 | Carl E. Mapes | Republican | 1912 | Incumbent re-elected. | ▌ ✓ Carl E. Mapes (Republican) 50.5%; ▌Thomas F. McAllister (Democratic) 48.2%; ▌Arie Van Doesburg (Socialist) 0.8%; ▌Harry K. Johnson (Communist) 0.3%; ▌Laurel L. Kosten (Farmer–Labor) 0.2% |
| Michigan 6 | Claude E. Cady | Democratic | 1932 | Incumbent lost re-election. Republican gain. | ▌ ✓ William W. Blackney (Republican) 50.6%; ▌Claude E. Cady (Democratic) 49.0%; ▌William Carley (Communist) 0.2%; ▌Seymour A. Ayers (Farmer–Labor) 0.09%; ▌Anthony Tueling (Socialist Labor) 0.07%; ▌Charles W. Browne (National) 0.03% |
| Michigan 7 | Jesse P. Wolcott | Republican | 1930 | Incumbent re-elected. | ▌ ✓ Jesse P. Wolcott (Republican) 59.9%; ▌Frank J. Wiegand (Democratic) 38.7%; ▌John Niederhauser (Socialist) 1.2%; ▌Sigmund Borawski (Communist) 0.1% |
| Michigan 8 | Michael J. Hart | Democratic | 1931 (special) | Incumbent lost re-election. Republican gain. | ▌ ✓ Fred L. Crawford (Republican) 51.5%; ▌Michael J. Hart (Democratic) 45.9%; ▌Simeon P. Martin (Farmer–Labor) 1.9%; ▌John J. Keon (Socialist) 0.7% |
| Michigan 9 | Harry W. Musselwhite | Democratic | 1932 | Incumbent lost re-election. Republican gain. | ▌ ✓ Albert J. Engel (Republican) 52.0%; ▌Harry W. Musselwhite (Democratic) 47.7%; ▌Herbert E. Aldrich (Communist) 0.3% |
| Michigan 10 | Roy O. Woodruff | Republican | 1920 | Incumbent re-elected. | ▌ ✓ Roy O. Woodruff (Republican) 59.5%; ▌Hubert J. Gaffney (Democratic) 39.8%; ▌William Rabideau (Socialist) 0.7% |
| Michigan 11 | Prentiss M. Brown | Democratic | 1932 | Incumbent re-elected. | ▌ ✓ Prentiss M. Brown (Democratic) 54.8%; ▌James J. O'Hara (Republican) 45.2% |
| Michigan 12 | W. Frank James | Republican | 1914 | Incumbent lost re-election. Democratic gain. | ▌ ✓ Frank Eugene Hook (Democratic) 52.1%; ▌W. Frank James (Republican) 47.9%; ▌Frank Arvola (Communist) 0.03% |
| Michigan 13 | Clarence J. McLeod | Republican | 1922 | Incumbent re-elected. | ▌ ✓ Clarence J. McLeod (Republican) 56.7%; ▌John H. Slevin (Democratic) 40.9%; ▌Meyer Schneider (Independent) 1.4%; ▌Daniel Burkhardt (Independent) 0.9%; ▌Thomas J. Rado (Independent) 0.1%; ▌Blanche Winters (American) 0.03% |
| Michigan 14 | Carl M. Weideman | Democratic | 1932 | Incumbent lost renomination. Democratic hold. | ▌ ✓ Louis C. Rabaut (Democratic) 62.2%; ▌John H. McPherson (Republican) 35.7%; ▌Axel Londal (Independent) 1.4%; ▌Earl Reno (Independent) 0.7% |
| Michigan 15 | John Dingell Sr. | Democratic | 1932 | Incumbent re-elected. | ▌ ✓ John Dingell Sr. (Democratic) 54.4%; ▌Charles Bowles (Republican) 43.4%; ▌Francis King (Independent) 1.4%; ▌Leo Sulkowski (Independent) 0.7%; ▌John F. Walzel (Independent) 0.1% |
| Michigan 16 | John Lesinski Sr. | Democratic | 1932 | Incumbent re-elected. | ▌ ✓ John Lesinski Sr. (Democratic) 52.7%; ▌Clyde Ford (Republican) 44.9%; ▌John T. Pace (Communist) 1.3%; ▌Merlin D. Bishop (Independent) 0.9%; ▌Joseph Horvath (Independent) 0.2% |
| Michigan 17 | George A. Dondero | Republican | 1932 | Incumbent re-elected. | ▌ ✓ George A. Dondero (Republican) 53.8%; ▌Charles P. Webster (Democratic) 44.2%; ▌W. H. Allmendiger (Socialist) 1.4%; ▌Otto Wittrick (Communist) 0.4%; ▌Thomas F. Slater (Socialist Labor) 0.2%; ▌William Allen Nelson (Farmer–Labor) 0.03% |

== Minnesota ==
| District | Incumbent | | | This race | |
| District | Member | Party | First elected | Results | Candidates |
|---|---|---|---|---|---|
| Minnesota 1 | None (new district) | | | New seat. Republican gain. | ▌ ✓ August H. Andresen (Republican) 46.6%; ▌John W. Feller (Democratic) 27.0%; ▌Otto Baudler (Farmer–Labor) 26.5% |
| Minnesota 2 | Henry M. Arens; Redistricted from the at-large district | Farmer–Labor | 1932 | Incumbent lost re-election. Democratic gain. | ▌ ✓ Elmer Ryan (Democratic) 37.2%; ▌Henry M. Arens (Farmer–Labor) 32.1%; ▌Louis P. Johnson (Republican) 30.7% |
| Minnesota 3 | Ernest Lundeen; Redistricted from the at-large district | Farmer–Labor | 1932 | Incumbent re-elected. | ▌ ✓ Ernest Lundeen (Farmer–Labor) 53.3%; ▌Josiah H. Chase (Republican) 25.8%; ▌John W. Schmidt (Democratic) 20.3%; ▌Peter O. Sjodin (Independent) 0.6% |
| Minnesota 4 | Einar Hoidale; Redistricted from the at-large district | Democratic | 1932 | Retired to run for U.S. senator. Republican gain. | ▌ ✓ Melvin Maas (Republican) 36.8%; ▌A. E. Smith (Farmer–Labor) 29.4%; ▌John J. McDonough (Democratic) 23.4%; ▌Charles J. Andre (Independent) 9.9%; ▌Thomas Tracy (Independent) 0.5% |
| Minnesota 5 | Theodore Christianson; Redistricted from the at-large district | Republican | 1932 | Incumbent re-elected. | ▌ ✓ Theodore Christianson (Republican) 39.3%; ▌Dewey W. Johnson (Farmer–Labor) 36.2%; ▌Sidney Benson (Democratic) 23.8%; ▌Harry Mayville (Independent) 0.4%; ▌George Riedel (Independent) 0.3% |
| Minnesota 5 | Ray P. Chase; Redistricted from the at-large district | Republican | 1932 | Incumbent lost renomination. Republican loss. | ▌ ✓ Theodore Christianson (Republican) 39.3%; ▌Dewey W. Johnson (Farmer–Labor) 36.2%; ▌Sidney Benson (Democratic) 23.8%; ▌Harry Mayville (Independent) 0.4%; ▌George Riedel (Independent) 0.3% |
| Minnesota 6 | Harold Knutson; Redistricted from the at-large district | Republican | 1916 | Incumbent re-elected. | ▌ ✓ Harold Knutson (Republican) 46.2%; ▌Magnus Johnson (Farmer–Labor) 37.8%; ▌Frank R. Weber (Democratic) 16.0% |
| Minnesota 6 | Magnus Johnson; Redistricted from the at-large district | Farmer–Labor | 1932 | Incumbent lost re-election. Farmer–Labor loss. | ▌ ✓ Harold Knutson (Republican) 46.2%; ▌Magnus Johnson (Farmer–Labor) 37.8%; ▌Frank R. Weber (Democratic) 16.0% |
| Minnesota 7 | Paul John Kvale; Redistricted from the at-large district | Farmer–Labor | 1929 (special) | Incumbent re-elected. | ▌ ✓ Paul John Kvale (Farmer–Labor) 59.3%; ▌Richard T. Daly (Democratic) 40.7% |
| Minnesota 8 | Francis Shoemaker; Redistricted from the at-large district | Farmer–Labor | 1932 | Incumbent lost re-election as an Independent. Republican gain. | ▌ ✓ William Alvin Pittenger (Republican) 35.7%; ▌Francis Shoemaker (Independent) 23.0%; ▌A. L. Winterquist (Farmer–Labor) 22.6%; ▌Jerry A. Harri (Democratic) 16.9%; ▌Thomas Foley (Independent) 1.8% |
| Minnesota 9 | None (new district) | | | New seat. Farmer–Labor gain. | ✓ Rich T. Buckler (Farmer–Labor) 44.2%; ▌Ole O. Sageng (Republican) 29.1%; ▌Martin Oscar Brandon (Democratic) 26.7% |

== Mississippi ==
| District | Incumbent | | | This race | |
| District | Member | Party | First elected | Results | Candidates |
|---|---|---|---|---|---|
| Mississippi 1 | John E. Rankin | Democratic | 1920 | Incumbent re-elected. | ▌ ✓ John E. Rankin (Democratic) Uncontested |
| Mississippi 2 | Wall Doxey | Democratic | 1928 | Incumbent re-elected. | ▌ ✓ Wall Doxey (Democratic) Uncontested |
| Mississippi 3 | William Madison Whittington | Democratic | 1924 | Incumbent re-elected. | ▌ ✓ William Madison Whittington (Democratic) Uncontested |
| Mississippi 4 | T. Jeff Busby | Democratic | 1922 | Incumbent lost renomination. Democratic hold. | ▌ ✓ Aaron L. Ford (Democratic) Uncontested |
| Mississippi 5 | Ross A. Collins | Democratic | 1920 | Incumbent retired to run for U.S. senator. Democratic hold. | ▌ ✓ Aubert C. Dunn (Democratic) Uncontested |
| Mississippi 6 | William M. Colmer | Democratic | 1932 | Incumbent re-elected. | ▌ ✓ William M. Colmer (Democratic) Uncontested |
| Mississippi 7 | Lawrence R. Ellzey | Democratic | 1932 | Incumbent lost renomination. Democratic hold. | ▌ ✓ Dan R. McGehee (Democratic) Uncontested |

== Missouri ==
| District | Incumbent | | | This race | |
| District | Member | Party | First elected | Results | Candidates |
|---|---|---|---|---|---|
| Missouri 1 | Milton A. Romjue; Redistricted from the at-large district | Democratic | 1922 | Incumbent re-elected. | ▌ ✓ Milton A. Romjue (Democratic) 54.8%; ▌J. Grover Morgan (Republican) 44.5%; ▌[FNU] Phillips (Socialist) 0.7% |
| Missouri 2 | Ralph F. Lozier; Redistricted from the at-large district | Democratic | 1922 | Incumbent lost renomination. Democratic hold. | ▌ ✓ William L. Nelson (Democratic) 58.6%; ▌[FNU] Logan (Republican) 41.2%; ▌[FNU] Miller (Socialist) 0.2% |
| Missouri 3 | Richard M. Duncan; Redistricted from the at-large district | Democratic | 1932 | Incumbent re-elected. | ▌ ✓ Richard M. Duncan (Democratic) 60.6%; ▌William A. Black (Republican) 39.3%; ▌[FNU] Bisby (Socialist) 0.08% |
| Missouri 3 | Jacob L. Milligan; Redistricted from the at-large district | Democratic | 1922 | Incumbent retired to run for U.S. senator. Democratic loss. | ▌ ✓ Richard M. Duncan (Democratic) 60.6%; ▌William A. Black (Republican) 39.3%; ▌[FNU] Bisby (Socialist) 0.08% |
| Missouri 4 | None (new district) | | | New seat. Democratic gain. | ▌ ✓ C. Jasper Bell (Democratic) 81.7%; ▌Horace Guffin (Republican) 18.1%; ▌Hartenberger (Socialist) 0.2% |
| Missouri 5 | Joe Shannon; Redistricted from the at-large district | Democratic | 1930 | Incumbent re-elected. | ▌ ✓ Joe Shannon (Democratic) 84.3%; ▌Claude Edward Sowers (Republican) 15.6%; ▌[FNU] Hodges (Socialist) 0.07%; ▌[FNU] Burke (Socialist Labor) 0.006% |
| Missouri 6 | Reuben T. Wood; Redistricted from the at-large district | Democratic | 1932 | Incumbent re-elected. | ▌ ✓ Reuben T. Wood (Democratic) 55.1%; ▌Oliver J. Page (Republican) 44.6%; ▌[FNU] Triplett (Socialist) 0.3% |
| Missouri 6 | Clement C. Dickinson; Redistricted from the at-large district | Democratic | 1930 | Incumbent lost renomination. Democratic loss. | ▌ ✓ Reuben T. Wood (Democratic) 55.1%; ▌Oliver J. Page (Republican) 44.6%; ▌[FNU] Triplett (Socialist) 0.3% |
| Missouri 6 | James Edward Ruffin; Redistricted from the at-large district | Democratic | 1932 | Incumbent lost renomination. Democratic loss. | ▌ ✓ Reuben T. Wood (Democratic) 55.1%; ▌Oliver J. Page (Republican) 44.6%; ▌[FNU] Triplett (Socialist) 0.3% |
| Missouri 7 | Frank H. Lee; Redistricted from the at-large district | Democratic | 1932 | Incumbent lost re-election. Republican gain. | ▌ ✓ Dewey Short (Republican) 52.9%; ▌Frank H. Lee (Democratic) 46.6%; ▌[FNU] High (Socialist) 0.5%; ▌[FNU] Day (Communist) 0.03% |
| Missouri 8 | Clyde Williams; Redistricted from the at-large district | Democratic | 1930 | Incumbent re-elected. | ▌ ✓ Clyde Williams (Democratic) 54.4%; ▌[FNU] Breuer (Republican) 45.6% |
| Missouri 9 | Clarence Cannon; Redistricted from the at-large district | Democratic | 1922 | Incumbent re-elected. | ▌ ✓ Clarence Cannon (Democratic) 62.4%; ▌[FNU] Voelkerding (Republican) 36.6%; ▌[FNU] Maczuk (Socialist) 0.9% |
| Missouri 10 | None (new district) | | | New seat. Democratic gain. | ▌ ✓ Orville Zimmerman (Democratic) 58.2%; ▌[FNU] McAnally (Republican) 40.7%; ▌[FNU] McCoy (Socialist) 1.1% |
| Missouri 11 | None (new district) | | | New seat. Democratic gain. | ▌ ✓ Thomas C. Hennings Jr. (Democratic) 56.4%; ▌Leonidas C. Dyer (Republican) 42.6%; ▌[FNU] Preisler (Socialist) 0.7%; ▌[FNU] Dukes (Communist) 0.2%; ▌[FNU] Baeff (Socialist Labor) 0.05% |
| Missouri 12 | James R. Claiborne; Redistricted from the at-large district | Democratic | 1932 | Incumbent re-elected. | ▌ ✓ James R. Claiborne (Democratic) 51.0%; ▌Cleveland A. Newton (Republican) 47.7%; ▌[FNU] Lechner (Socialist) 1.2%; ▌[FNU] Tendler (Socialist Labor) 0.06% |
| Missouri 13 | John J. Cochran; Redistricted from the at-large district | Democratic | 1926 | Incumbent re-elected. | ▌ ✓ John J. Cochran (Democratic) 65.5%; ▌George W. Strodtman (Republican) 33.9%; ▌[FNU] Saunders (Socialist) 0.6%; ▌[FNU] Kochendorfer (Socialist Labor) 0.03% |

== Montana ==
| District | Incumbent | | | This race | |
| District | Member | Party | First elected | Results | Candidates |
|---|---|---|---|---|---|
| Montana 1 | Joseph P. Monaghan | Democratic | 1932 | Incumbent re-elected. | ▌ ✓ Joseph P. Monaghan (Democratic) 67.8%; ▌D. D. Evans (Republican) 31.0%; ▌Charles Schneider (Socialist) 0.8%; ▌George Salisbury (Communist) 0.3% |
| Montana 2 | Roy E. Ayers | Democratic | 1932 | Incumbent re-elected. | ▌ ✓ Roy E. Ayers (Democratic) 69.8%; ▌Stanley E. Felt (Republican) 29.5%; ▌Yale Adams (Socialist) 0.7% |

== Nebraska ==
| District | Incumbent | | | This race | |
| District | Member | Party | First elected | Results | Candidates |
|---|---|---|---|---|---|
| Nebraska 1 | John H. Morehead | Democratic | 1922 | Incumbent retired. Democratic hold. | ▌ ✓ Henry Carl Luckey (Democratic) 52.9%; ▌Marcus L. Poteet (Republican) 42.7%; ▌Wilber E. Sanford (Independent) 4.4% |
| Nebraska 2 | Edward R. Burke | Democratic | 1932 | Incumbent retired to run for U.S. senator. Democratic hold. | ▌ ✓ Charles F. McLaughlin (Democratic) 54.2%; ▌Herbert Rhoades (Republican) 42.5%; ▌Edward S. Burdick (Independent) 2.2%; ▌Hugh W. Thomas (Independent) 1.1% |
| Nebraska 3 | Edgar Howard | Democratic | 1922 | Incumbent lost re-election. Republican gain. | ▌ ✓ Karl Stefan (Republican) 58.1%; ▌Edgar Howard (Democratic) 41.9% |
| Nebraska 4 | Ashton C. Shallenberger | Democratic | 1930 | Incumbent lost renomination. Democratic hold. | ▌ ✓ Charles Gustav Binderup (Democratic) 58.4%; ▌James W. Hammond (Republican) 41.6% |
| Nebraska 5 | Terry Carpenter | Democratic | 1932 | Incumbent retired to run for Governor of Nebraska. Democratic hold. | ▌ ✓ Harry B. Coffee (Democratic) 52.0%; ▌Albert N. Mathers (Republican) 45.9%; ▌Burt Sell (Independent) 1.0%; ▌Harold B. Applegate (Independent) 1.0% |

== Nevada ==
| District | Incumbent | | | This race | |
| District | Member | Party | First elected | Results | Candidates |
|---|---|---|---|---|---|
| Nevada at-large | James G. Scrugham | Democratic | 1932 | Incumbent re-elected. | ▌ ✓ James G. Scrugham (Democratic) 71.2%; ▌George B. Russell (Republican) 28.8% |

== New Hampshire ==
| District | Incumbent | | | This race | |
| District | Member | Party | First elected | Results | Candidates |
|---|---|---|---|---|---|
| New Hampshire 1 | William Nathaniel Rogers | Democratic | 1932 | Incumbent re-elected. | ▌ ✓ William Nathaniel Rogers (Democratic) 53.9%; ▌Arthur B. Jenks (Republican) 46.0%; ▌Forrest E. Crawford (Communist) 0.1% |
| New Hampshire 2 | Charles W. Tobey | Republican | 1932 | Incumbent re-elected. | ▌ ✓ Charles W. Tobey (Republican) 53.3%; ▌Harry B. Metcalf (Democratic) 46.3%; ▌Mary T. Whitney (Socialist) 0.2%; ▌Maurice O. Hudson (Communist) 0.2% |

== New Jersey ==
| District | Incumbent | | | This race | |
| District | Member | Party | First elected | Results | Candidates |
|---|---|---|---|---|---|
| New Jersey 1 | Charles A. Wolverton | Republican | 1926 | Incumbent re-elected. | ▌ ✓ Charles A. Wolverton (Republican) 61.2%; ▌Willis Tullis Porch (Democratic) 36.6%; ▌Morris Stempa (Socialist) 1.6%; ▌Robert Thomas Lee (Prohibition) 0.6% |
| New Jersey 2 | Isaac Bacharach | Republican | 1914 | Incumbent re-elected. | ▌ ✓ Isaac Bacharach (Republican) 50.4%; ▌Charles W. Ackley (Democratic) 49.3%; ▌Franklin L. Watkins (Socialist) 0.2% |
| New Jersey 3 | William H. Sutphin | Democratic | 1930 | Incumbent re-elected. | ▌ ✓ William H. Sutphin (Democratic) 52.2%; ▌Oliver F. Van Camp (Republican) 47.3%; ▌Theodore T. Burlew (Socialist) 0.3%; ▌James Nolan (Communist) 0.1% |
| New Jersey 4 | D. Lane Powers | Republican | 1932 | Incumbent re-elected. | ▌ ✓ D. Lane Powers (Republican) 56.7%; ▌Walter Lincoln Whittlesey (Democratic) 42.2%; ▌William C. Kauffman (Socialist) 0.6%; ▌William T. Love (Farmer–Labor) 0.2%; ▌Thomas McNally (Communist) 0.2%; ▌C. D. Mendenhall (Personal Choice) 0.001% |
| New Jersey 5 | Charles A. Eaton | Republican | 1924 | Incumbent re-elected. | ▌ ✓ Charles A. Eaton (Republican) 51.7%; ▌Charles S. MacKenzie (Democratic) 47.4%; ▌Bordeaux W. Stokes (Socialist) 0.7%; ▌Alexander Friel (Communist) 0.2%; ▌John Stelling (Personal Choice) 0.001% |
| New Jersey 6 | Donald H. McLean | Republican | 1932 | Incumbent re-elected. | ▌ ✓ Donald H. McLean (Republican) 52.5%; ▌Richard U. Strong (Democratic) 46.4%; ▌Harry F. Kopp (Socialist) 0.7%; ▌Renious Edwards (Communist) 0.3% |
| New Jersey 7 | Randolph Perkins | Republican | 1920 | Incumbent re-elected. | ▌ ✓ Randolph Perkins (Republican) 51.3%; ▌Hamilton Cross (Democratic) 47.7%; ▌John Hoverman (Socialist) 0.7%; ▌Simon Saller (Communist) 0.3% |
| New Jersey 8 | George N. Seger | Republican | 1922 | Incumbent re-elected. | ▌ ✓ George N. Seger (Republican) 53.6%; ▌Frank J. Van Noort (Democratic) 44.1%; ▌Garrett DeYoung (Socialist) 1.3%; ▌Martin Russak (Communist) 0.6%; ▌Jacob H. Schmitter (Socialist Labor) 0.2%; ▌Ernest E. Clock (Prohibition) 0.08% |
| New Jersey 9 | Edward A. Kenney | Democratic | 1932 | Incumbent re-elected. | ▌ ✓ Edward A. Kenney (Democratic) 54.6%; ▌John Pollock (Republican) 44.4%; ▌Henry J. Cox (Socialist) 1.0% |
| New Jersey 10 | Fred A. Hartley Jr. | Republican | 1928 | Incumbent re-elected. | ▌ ✓ Fred A. Hartley Jr. (Republican) 52.9%; ▌William Herda Smith (Democratic) 46.4%; ▌Andrew P. Wittel (Socialist) 0.6%; ▌John Johnson Jr. (Communist) 0.2% |
| New Jersey 11 | Peter Angelo Cavicchia | Republican | 1930 | Incumbent re-elected. | ▌ ✓ Peter Angelo Cavicchia (Republican) 50.0%; ▌Edward L. O'Neill (Democratic) 49.1%; ▌M. Hart Walker (Socialist) 0.5%; ▌Guyser Manago (Communist) 0.3%; ▌Mildred C. Bopp (Socialist Labor) 0.06% |
| New Jersey 12 | Frederick R. Lehlbach | Republican | 1914 | Incumbent re-elected. | ▌ ✓ Frederick R. Lehlbach (Republican) 54.3%; ▌Charles P. McCann (Democratic) 44.4%; ▌Louis Reiss (Socialist) 1.0%; ▌Sam Strong (Communist) 0.4% |
| New Jersey 13 | Mary Teresa Norton | Democratic | 1924 | Incumbent re-elected. | ▌ ✓ Mary Teresa Norton (Democratic) 73.2%; ▌Anthony L. Montelli (Republican) 26.4%; ▌William Kane Tallman (Socialist) 0.3%; ▌Stanley Szelazek (Communist) 0.1% |
| New Jersey 14 | Oscar L. Auf der Heide | Democratic | 1924 | Incumbent retired. Democratic hold. | ▌ ✓ Edward J. Hart (Democratic) 77.7%; ▌Fred G. Tauber (Republican) 21.3%; ▌Philip Nemoff (Socialist) 0.7%; ▌Lillian Andrews (Communist) 0.2%; ▌Karl Zimmermann (Socialist Labor) 0.08%; ▌John Herron (Independent) 0.06% |

== New Mexico ==
| District | Incumbent | | | This race | |
| District | Member | Party | First elected | Results | Candidates |
|---|---|---|---|---|---|
| New Mexico at-large | Dennis Chávez | Democratic | 1930 | Incumbent retired to run for U.S. senator. Democratic hold. | ▌ ✓ John J. Dempsey (Democratic) 51.8%; ▌Maurecio F. Miera (Republican) 47.7%; ▌Frank Edwards (Socialist) 0.4%; ▌H. Turnbaugh (Communist) 0.09% |

== New York ==
| District | Incumbent | | | This race | |
| District | Member | Party | First elected | Results | Candidates |
|---|---|---|---|---|---|
| New York 1 | Robert L. Bacon | Republican | 1922 | Incumbent re-elected. | ▌ ✓ Robert L. Bacon (Republican) 56.0%; ▌Gerald Morrell (Democratic) 41.4%; ▌Eric E. De Marsh (Socialist) 2.4%; ▌August Henkel (Communist) 0.2% |
| New York 2 | William F. Brunner | Democratic | 1928 | Incumbent re-elected. | ▌ ✓ William F. Brunner (Democratic) 69.6%; ▌Thomas J. Styles (Republican) 23.9%; ▌Samuel A. DeWitt (Socialist) 3.2%; ▌Mark Jackson (Independent) 2.3%; ▌Paul P. Crosbie (Independent) 1.0% |
| New York 3 | George W. Lindsay | Democratic | 1922 | Incumbent lost renomination. Democratic hold. | ▌ ✓ Joseph L. Pfeifer (Democratic) 72.7%; ▌Alex Pisciotta (Republican) 22.3%; ▌Joseph A. Weil (Socialist) 3.3%; ▌Dominick Flaiani (Independent) 1.7% |
| New York 4 | Thomas H. Cullen | Democratic | 1918 | Incumbent re-elected. | ▌ ✓ Thomas H. Cullen (Democratic) 74.5%; ▌Charles E. Miller (Republican) 22.3%; ▌David M. Cory (Socialist) 2.5%; ▌Joe Roberts (Independent) 0.8% |
| New York 5 | Loring M. Black Jr. | Democratic | 1922 | Incumbent retired. Democratic hold. | ▌ ✓ Marcellus H. Evans (Democratic) 64.7%; ▌Frank E. Davis (Republican) 29.9%; ▌Max H. Frankle (Socialist) 4.0%; ▌Abraham Markoff (Independent) 1.2%; ▌Alva L. McDonald (Independent) 0.3% |
| New York 6 | Andrew Lawrence Somers | Democratic | 1924 | Incumbent re-elected. | ▌ ✓ Andrew Lawrence Somers (Democratic) 60.9%; ▌Donald C. Strachan (Republican) 26.6%; ▌Jacob Axelrad (Socialist) 9.0%; ▌Robert Alfred Campbell (Independent) 3.5% |
| New York 7 | John J. Delaney | Democratic | 1931 (special) | Incumbent re-elected. | ▌ ✓ John J. Delaney (Democratic) 67.9%; ▌Joseph M. Aimee (Republican) 23.2%; ▌Alexander Kahn (Socialist) 5.9%; ▌Clarence Hathaway (Independent) 3.0% |
| New York 8 | Patrick J. Carley | Democratic | 1926 | Incumbent retired. Democratic hold. | ▌ ✓ Richard J. Tonry (Democratic) 59.2%; ▌Sigurd J. Arnesen (Republican) 23.6%; ▌Baruch C. Vladeck (Socialist) 11.8%; ▌Hyman Costrill (Independent) 4.0%; ▌Joseph B. Melgram (Law) 1.0%; ▌Herman Shapiro (Independent) 0.4% |
| New York 9 | Stephen A. Rudd | Democratic | 1931 (special) | Incumbent re-elected. | ▌ ✓ Stephen A. Rudd (Democratic) 60.6%; ▌Murray Rosof (Republican) 32.6%; ▌Theodore Shapiro (Socialist) 5.1%; ▌Tillie Littinsky (Independent) 1.7% |
| New York 10 | Emanuel Celler | Democratic | 1922 | Incumbent re-elected. | ▌ ✓ Emanuel Celler (Democratic) 60.9%; ▌Michael C. Antonelli (Republican) 28.8%; ▌Samuel H. Friedman (Socialist) 6.8%; ▌Henry Williams (Independent) 3.5% |
| New York 11 | Anning S. Prall | Democratic | 1923 (special) | Incumbent retired. Democratic hold. | ▌ ✓ James A. O'Leary (Democratic) 59.9%; ▌Arthur L. Willshaw (Republican) 25.6%; ▌Vernon B. Hampton (Independent) 11.0%; ▌Walter Dearing (Socialist) 2.6%; ▌Gussie Reed (Independent) 1.0% |
| New York 12 | Samuel Dickstein | Democratic | 1922 | Incumbent re-elected. | ▌ ✓ Samuel Dickstein (Democratic) 76.8%; ▌Solomon Siss (Republican) 15.6%; ▌Abraham P. Conan (Socialist) 3.9%; ▌Joseph Brandt (Independent) 3.7% |
| New York 13 | Christopher D. Sullivan | Democratic | 1916 | Incumbent re-elected. | ▌ ✓ Christopher D. Sullivan (Democratic) 72.3%; ▌John Rosenberg (Republican) 21.1%; ▌David Lasser (Socialist) 3.6%; ▌Henry Forbes (Independent) 3.0% |
| New York 14 | William I. Sirovich | Democratic | 1926 | Incumbent re-elected. | ▌ ✓ William I. Sirovich (Democratic) 52.8%; ▌Frederick J. Groehl (Republican) 33.4%; ▌Rachel Panken (Socialist) 7.7%; ▌Peter Cacchione (Independent) 5.5%; ▌Lyman A. Garber (Independent) 0.5% |
| New York 15 | John J. Boylan | Democratic | 1922 | Incumbent re-elected. | ▌ ✓ John J. Boylan (Democratic) 80.2%; ▌Frank J. McCoy (Republican) 16.1%; ▌Jessie W. Hughan (Socialist) 2.0%; ▌Dale Jones (Independent) 1.6% |
| New York 16 | John J. O'Connor | Democratic | 1923 (special) | Incumbent re-elected. | ▌ ✓ John J. O'Connor (Democratic) 66.3%; ▌J. Homer Cudmore (Republican) 28.6%; ▌George Turitz (Socialist) 2.9%; ▌Pauline Rogers (Independent) 2.1% |
| New York 17 | Theodore A. Peyser | Democratic | 1932 | Incumbent re-elected. | ▌ ✓ Theodore A. Peyser (Democratic) 53.9%; ▌George A. Spiegelberg (Republican) 41.7%; ▌Henry Fruchter (Socialist) 3.1%; ▌William Albertson (Independent) 1.3% |
| New York 18 | Martin J. Kennedy | Democratic | 1930 | Incumbent re-elected. | ▌ ✓ Martin J. Kennedy (Democratic) 69.0%; ▌Charles W. Ferry (Republican) 26.0%; ▌Emerich Steinberger (Socialist) 3.4%; ▌Sidney LeRoy (Independent) 1.6% |
| New York 19 | Sol Bloom | Democratic | 1923 (special) | Incumbent re-elected. | ▌ ✓ Sol Bloom (Democratic) 65.3%; ▌Harold Goldman (Republican) 28.5%; ▌Layle Lane (Socialist) 3.8%; ▌Peter Uffre (Independent) 2.3% |
| New York 20 | James J. Lanzetta | Democratic | 1932 | Incumbent lost re-election. Republican gain. | ▌ ✓ Vito Marcantonio (Republican) 46.6%; ▌James J. Lanzetta (Democratic) 45.8%; ▌Edward J. Cassidy (Socialist) 4.3%; ▌Orvaldo Eusepi (Independent) 3.3% |
| New York 21 | Joseph A. Gavagan | Democratic | 1929 (special) | Incumbent re-elected. | ▌ ✓ Joseph A. Gavagan (Democratic) 68.2%; ▌Kenneth Cameron (Republican) 25.9%; ▌Frank R. Crosswaith (Socialist) 4.4%; ▌James W. Ford (Independent) 1.5% |
| New York 22 | Anthony J. Griffin | Democratic | 1918 | Incumbent re-elected. | ▌ ✓ Anthony J. Griffin (Democratic) 69.3%; ▌John J. Sochurek (Republican) 22.3%; ▌Charles B. Garfinkel (Socialist) 4.1%; ▌Samuel Acquina (Independent) 2.2%; ▌Richard Sullivan (Independent) 2.0% |
| New York 23 | Frank A. Oliver | Democratic | 1922 | Incumbent resigned when appointed justice. Democratic hold. | ▌ ✓ Charles A. Buckley (Democratic) 64.2%; ▌Isaac F. Becker (Republican) 18.2%; ▌Samuel Orr (Socialist) 8.4%; ▌Moissye Olgin (Independent) 4.4%; ▌Michael J. Villamena (Independent) 3.6%; ▌Benjamin Gassman (Independent) 0.9%; ▌I. Benjamin Schachter (Independent) 0.2% |
| New York 24 | James M. Fitzpatrick | Democratic | 1926 | Incumbent re-elected. | ▌ ✓ James M. Fitzpatrick (Democratic) 60.1%; ▌John H. Nichols (Republican) 29.6%; ▌Solomon Perrin (Socialist) 6.5%; ▌Austin Hogan (Communist) 3.9% |
| New York 25 | Charles D. Millard | Republican | 1930 | Incumbent re-elected. | ▌ ✓ Charles D. Millard (Republican) 54.8%; ▌Homer A. Stebbins (Democratic) 42.5%; ▌Leonard Bright (Socialist) 2.5%; ▌Louise Morrison (Communist) 0.3% |
| New York 26 | Hamilton Fish III | Republican | 1920 | Incumbent re-elected. | ▌ ✓ Hamilton Fish III (Republican) 61.9%; ▌Thomas Pendell (Democratic) 38.1% |
| New York 27 | Philip A. Goodwin | Republican | 1932 | Incumbent re-elected. | ▌ ✓ Philip A. Goodwin (Republican) 55.7%; ▌Willis G. Nash (Democratic) 44.3% |
| New York 28 | Parker Corning | Democratic | 1922 | Incumbent re-elected. | ▌ ✓ Parker Corning (Democratic) 70.1%; ▌Frank R. Lanagan (Republican) 28.3%; ▌Nelson Belanger (Socialist) 1.6% |
| New York 29 | William D. Thomas | Republican | 1934 (special) | Incumbent re-elected. | ▌ ✓ William D. Thomas (Republican) 58.4%; ▌Buell G. Brayton (Democratic) 39.4%; ▌Coleman B. Cheney (Socialist) 2.2% |
| New York 30 | Frank Crowther | Republican | 1918 | Incumbent re-elected. | ▌ ✓ Frank Crowther (Republican) 50.8%; ▌Carrol A. Gardner (Democratic) 46.4%; ▌Lewi Tonks (Socialist) 2.5%; ▌Clarence Carr (Communist) 0.3% |
| New York 31 | Bertrand Snell | Republican | 1915 (special) | Incumbent re-elected. | ▌ ✓ Bertrand Snell (Republican) 62.0%; ▌Kenneth Gardner (Democratic) 37.1%; ▌Milford W. Deitz (Socialist) 1.0% |
| New York 32 | Francis D. Culkin | Republican | 1928 | Incumbent re-elected. | ▌ ✓ Francis D. Culkin (Republican) 67.0%; ▌Annie D. Mills (Democratic) 31.3%; ▌George Arnold (Socialist) 1.7% |
| New York 33 | Fred Sisson | Democratic | 1932 | Incumbent re-elected. | ▌ ✓ Fred Sisson (Democratic) 49.1%; ▌Frederick M. Davenport (Republican) 48.9%; ▌Anthony Spadafora (Socialist) 1.8%; ▌Fred C. Foster (Law) 0.2% |
| New York 34 | Marian W. Clarke | Republican | 1933 (special) | Incumbent retired. Republican hold. | ▌ ✓ Bert Lord (Republican) 60.1%; ▌Charles C. Flaesch (Democratic) 38.2%; ▌Pierre De Nio (Socialist) 1.4%; ▌Matthew J. Maxian (Communist) 0.3% |
| New York 35 | Clarence E. Hancock | Republican | 1927 (special) | Incumbent re-elected. | ▌ ✓ Clarence E. Hancock (Republican) 54.7%; ▌Richard P. Byrne (Democratic) 42.1%; ▌Gustave A. Strebel (Socialist) 2.4%; ▌Lloyd Roberts (Law) 0.5%; ▌Sam Belkowitz (Communist) 0.2% |
| New York 36 | John Taber | Republican | 1922 | Incumbent re-elected. | ▌ ✓ John Taber (Republican) 61.0%; ▌Dennis F. Sullivan (Democratic) 36.4%; ▌Alexander Benedict (Socialist) 2.2%; ▌Charles Van Gordon (Law) 0.4% |
| New York 37 | Gale H. Stalker | Republican | 1922 | Incumbent retired. Republican hold. | ▌ ✓ W. Sterling Cole (Republican) 59.8%; ▌Julian P. Bretz (Democratic) 35.4%; ▌Neil D. Cranmer (Law) 2.7%; ▌William C. Perry (Socialist) 1.9%; ▌Sammie A. Abbott (Communist) 0.2% |
| New York 38 | James L. Whitley | Republican | 1928 | Incumbent lost re-election. Democratic gain. | ▌ ✓ James P. B. Duffy (Democratic) 54.2%; ▌James L. Whitley (Republican) 42.1%; ▌Jack Britt Gearity (Socialist) 2.4%; ▌Gertrude Welsh (Communist) 0.8%; ▌James A. Alesi (Independent) 0.4%; ▌Harry Paul (Independent) 0.2% |
| New York 39 | James W. Wadsworth Jr. | Republican | 1932 | Incumbent re-elected. | ▌ ✓ James W. Wadsworth Jr. (Republican) 56.2%; ▌David A. White (Democratic) 41.3%; ▌John Vanden Bosch (Socialist) 2.3%; ▌Canio Parrini (Communist) 0.2% |
| New York 40 | Walter G. Andrews | Republican | 1930 | Incumbent re-elected. | ▌ ✓ Walter G. Andrews (Republican) 55.7%; ▌Frank S. Anderson (Democratic) 40.6%; ▌Herman J. Hahn (Socialist) 3.7% |
| New York 41 | Alfred F. Beiter | Democratic | 1932 | Incumbent re-elected. | ▌ ✓ Alfred F. Beiter (Democratic) 55.7%; ▌Carlton A. Fisher (Republican) 41.0%; ▌Ernest D. Baumann (Socialist) 3.3% |
| New York 42 | James M. Mead | Democratic | 1918 | Incumbent re-elected. | ▌ ✓ James M. Mead (Democratic) 63.8%; ▌Walter J. Lohr (Republican) 33.7%; ▌Marklet H. Harding (Socialist) 2.5% |
| New York 43 | Daniel A. Reed | Republican | 1918 | Incumbent re-elected. | ▌ ✓ Daniel A. Reed (Republican) 62.4%; ▌Peter B. Hogan (Democratic) 33.5%; ▌Fred J. Smith (Socialist) 3.8%; ▌Howard Albro (Communist) 0.3% |
| New York at-large Seat A | Elmer E. Studley | Democratic | 1932 | Incumbent retired. Democratic hold. | ▌ ✓ Caroline O'Day (Democratic) 27.6%; ▌ ✓ Matthew J. Merritt (Democratic) 27.3%; ▌Natalie F. Couch (Republican) 19.8%; ▌William B. Groat Jr. (Republican) 19.4%; ▌Charles W. Noonan (Socialist) 2.0%; ▌August Claessens (Socialist) 1.9%; ▌Henry Sheppard (Communist) 0.7%; ▌Emanuel Levin (Communist) 0.7%; ▌Dorothy Frooks (Law) 0.3%; ▌William E. Barron (Law) 0.2%; ▌Jeremiah D. Crowley (Socialist Labor) 0.1%; ▌Jacob Berlin (Socialist Labor) 0.09% |
| New York at-large Seat B | John Fitzgibbons | Democratic | 1932 | Incumbent retired. Democratic hold. | ▌ ✓ Caroline O'Day (Democratic) 27.6%; ▌ ✓ Matthew J. Merritt (Democratic) 27.3%; ▌Natalie F. Couch (Republican) 19.8%; ▌William B. Groat Jr. (Republican) 19.4%; ▌Charles W. Noonan (Socialist) 2.0%; ▌August Claessens (Socialist) 1.9%; ▌Henry Sheppard (Communist) 0.7%; ▌Emanuel Levin (Communist) 0.7%; ▌Dorothy Frooks (Law) 0.3%; ▌William E. Barron (Law) 0.2%; ▌Jeremiah D. Crowley (Socialist Labor) 0.1%; ▌Jacob Berlin (Socialist Labor) 0.09% |

== North Carolina ==
| District | Incumbent | | | This race | |
| District | Member | Party | First elected | Results | Candidates |
|---|---|---|---|---|---|
| North Carolina 1 | Lindsay C. Warren | Democratic | 1924 | Incumbent re-elected. | ▌ ✓ Lindsay C. Warren (Democratic) 87.8%; ▌R. C. Dozier (Republican) 12.2% |
| North Carolina 2 | John H. Kerr | Democratic | 1923 (special) | Incumbent re-elected. | ▌ ✓ John H. Kerr (Democratic) Uncontested |
| North Carolina 3 | Charles L. Abernethy | Democratic | 1922 | Incumbent lost renomination. Democratic hold. | ▌ ✓ Graham Arthur Barden (Democratic) 67.1%; ▌W. B. Rouse (Republican) 32.9% |
| North Carolina 4 | Harold D. Cooley | Democratic | 1934 (special) | Incumbent re-elected. | ▌ ✓ Harold D. Cooley (Democratic) 68.5%; ▌Hobart Brantley (Republican) 31.5% |
| North Carolina 5 | Franklin Wills Hancock Jr. | Democratic | 1930 | Incumbent re-elected. | ▌ ✓ Franklin Wills Hancock Jr. (Democratic) Uncontested |
| North Carolina 6 | William B. Umstead | Democratic | 1932 | Incumbent re-elected. | ▌ ✓ William B. Umstead (Democratic) 69.0%; ▌B. C. Campbell (Republican) 31.0% |
| North Carolina 7 | J. Bayard Clark | Democratic | 1928 | Incumbent re-elected. | ▌ ✓ J. Bayard Clark (Democratic) 78.9%; ▌Louis Goodman (Republican) 21.1% |
| North Carolina 8 | Walter Lambeth | Democratic | 1930 | Incumbent re-elected. | ▌ ✓ Walter Lambeth (Democratic) 57.9%; ▌Avalon E. Hall (Republican) 42.1% |
| North Carolina 9 | Robert L. Doughton | Democratic | 1910 | Incumbent re-elected. | ▌ ✓ Robert L. Doughton (Democratic) 58.2%; ▌Joseph M. Prevette (Republican) 41.8% |
| North Carolina 10 | Alfred L. Bulwinkle | Democratic | 1930 | Incumbent re-elected. | ▌ ✓ Alfred L. Bulwinkle (Democratic) 53.5%; ▌Calvin R. Edney (Republican) 46.5% |
| North Carolina 11 | Zebulon Weaver | Democratic | 1930 | Incumbent re-elected. | ▌ ✓ Zebulon Weaver (Democratic) 59.6%; ▌Halsey B. Leavitt (Republican) 40.4% |

== North Dakota ==
| District | Incumbent | | | This race | |
| District | Member | Party | First elected | Results | Candidates |
|---|---|---|---|---|---|
| North Dakota At-large | William Lemke | Republican-NPL | 1932 | Incumbent re-elected. | ▌ ✓ William Lemke (Republican-NPL) 30.6%; ▌ ✓ Usher L. Burdick (Republican-NPL) 24.3%; ▌William D. Lynch (Democratic) 18.1%; ▌G. F. Lamb (Democratic) 16.8%; ▌James H. Sinclair (Progressive) 9.8%; ▌Jasper Haaland (Communist) 0.3%; ▌Effie Kjorstad (Communist) 0.2% |
| North Dakota At-large | James H. Sinclair | Republican | 1918 | Incumbent lost renomination. Republican hold. | ▌ ✓ William Lemke (Republican-NPL) 30.6%; ▌ ✓ Usher L. Burdick (Republican-NPL) 24.3%; ▌William D. Lynch (Democratic) 18.1%; ▌G. F. Lamb (Democratic) 16.8%; ▌James H. Sinclair (Progressive) 9.8%; ▌Jasper Haaland (Communist) 0.3%; ▌Effie Kjorstad (Communist) 0.2% |

== Ohio ==
| District | Incumbent | | | This race | |
| District | Member | Party | First elected | Results | Candidates |
|---|---|---|---|---|---|
| Ohio 1 | John B. Hollister | Republican | 1931 (special) | Incumbent re-elected. | ▌ ✓ John B. Hollister (Republican) 55.8%; ▌Edwin G. Becker (Democratic) 44.2% |
| Ohio 2 | William E. Hess | Republican | 1928 | Incumbent re-elected. | ▌ ✓ William E. Hess (Republican) 55.1%; ▌Charles E. Miller (Democratic) 44.9% |
| Ohio 3 | Byron B. Harlan | Democratic | 1930 | Incumbent re-elected. | ▌ ✓ Byron B. Harlan (Democratic) 53.6%; ▌Howard F. Heald (Republican) 44.8%; ▌Jere F. Mincher (Socialist) 1.0%; ▌Walter Jones (Communist) 0.6% |
| Ohio 4 | Frank L. Kloeb | Democratic | 1932 | Incumbent re-elected. | ▌ ✓ Frank L. Kloeb (Democratic) 53.9%; ▌Guy D. Hawley (Republican) 46.1% |
| Ohio 5 | Frank C. Kniffin | Democratic | 1930 | Incumbent re-elected. | ▌ ✓ Frank C. Kniffin (Democratic) 55.5%; ▌Davis B. Johnson (Republican) 44.5% |
| Ohio 6 | James G. Polk | Democratic | 1930 | Incumbent re-elected. | ▌ ✓ James G. Polk (Democratic) 52.1%; ▌Albert L. Daniels (Republican) 47.5%; ▌Mark A. Crawford (Independent) 0.4% |
| Ohio 7 | Leroy T. Marshall | Republican | 1932 | Incumbent re-elected. | ▌ ✓ Leroy T. Marshall (Republican) 56.6%; ▌C. W. Rich (Democratic) 43.4% |
| Ohio 8 | Thomas B. Fletcher | Democratic | 1932 | Incumbent re-elected. | ▌ ✓ Thomas B. Fletcher (Democratic) 52.2%; ▌Gertrude Jones (Republican) 47.8% |
| Ohio 9 | Warren J. Duffey | Democratic | 1932 | Incumbent re-elected. | ▌ ✓ Warren J. Duffey (Democratic) 62.3%; ▌Frank L. Mulholland (Republican) 36.5%; ▌Kenneth Eggert (Communist) 0.7%; ▌Karl Pauli (Socialist) 0.5% |
| Ohio 10 | Thomas A. Jenkins | Republican | 1924 | Incumbent re-elected. | ▌ ✓ Thomas A. Jenkins (Republican) 58.4%; ▌W. F. Marting (Democratic) 41.6% |
| Ohio 11 | Mell G. Underwood | Democratic | 1922 | Incumbent re-elected. | ▌ ✓ Mell G. Underwood (Democratic) 57.4%; ▌Renick W. Dunlap (Republican) 42.6% |
| Ohio 12 | Arthur P. Lamneck | Democratic | 1930 | Incumbent re-elected. | ▌ ✓ Arthur P. Lamneck (Democratic) 55.7%; ▌John C. Speaks (Republican) 44.3% |
| Ohio 13 | William L. Fiesinger | Democratic | 1930 | Incumbent re-elected. | ▌ ✓ William L. Fiesinger (Democratic) 54.3%; ▌Walter E. Kruger (Republican) 44.7%; ▌Charles C. Few (Independent) 1.0% |
| Ohio 14 | Dow W. Harter | Democratic | 1932 | Incumbent re-elected. | ▌ ✓ Dow W. Harter (Democratic) 49.1%; ▌Carl D. Sheppard (Republican) 47.7%; ▌James McCarten (Independent) 1.6%; ▌Park Sumner (Socialist) 0.9%; ▌Frederick W. Seibert (Communist) 0.8% |
| Ohio 15 | Robert T. Secrest | Democratic | 1932 | Incumbent re-elected. | ▌ ✓ Robert T. Secrest (Democratic) 55.7%; ▌Kenneth C. Ray (Republican) 44.3% |
| Ohio 16 | William R. Thom | Democratic | 1932 | Incumbent re-elected. | ▌ ✓ William R. Thom (Democratic) 56.7%; ▌Charles B. McClintock (Republican) 43.3% |
| Ohio 17 | Charles F. West | Democratic | 1930 | Incumbent retired to run for U.S. senator. Democratic hold. | ▌ ✓ William A. Ashbrook (Democratic) 54.0%; ▌James A. Glenn (Republican) 46.0% |
| Ohio 18 | Lawrence E. Imhoff | Democratic | 1932 | Incumbent re-elected. | ▌ ✓ Lawrence E. Imhoff (Democratic) 55.4%; ▌B. Frank Murphy (Republican) 44.6% |
| Ohio 19 | John G. Cooper | Republican | 1914 | Incumbent re-elected. | ▌ ✓ John G. Cooper (Republican) 51.2%; ▌Locke Miller (Democratic) 47.4%; ▌Harry K. Collins (Socialist) 0.7%; ▌Joe Dallet (Communist) 0.7% |
| Ohio 20 | Martin L. Sweeney | Democratic | 1931 (special) | Incumbent re-elected. | ▌ ✓ Martin L. Sweeney (Democratic) 67.9%; ▌Joseph E. Cassidy (Republican) 29.4%; ▌A. Landy (Communist) 2.1%; ▌Sidney Yellen (Socialist) 0.6% |
| Ohio 21 | Robert Crosser | Democratic | 1922 | Incumbent re-elected. | ▌ ✓ Robert Crosser (Democratic) 63.8%; ▌Frank W. Sotak (Republican) 33.9%; ▌E. C. Greenfield (Communist) 2.3% |
| Ohio 22 | Chester C. Bolton | Republican | 1928 | Incumbent re-elected. | ▌ ✓ Chester C. Bolton (Republican) 52.1%; ▌William C. Dixon (Democratic) 46.3%; ▌C. B. Cowan (Communist) 1.1%; ▌Max Epstein (Socialist) 0.5% |
| Ohio at-large | Charles V. Truax | Democratic | 1932 | Incumbent re-elected. | ▌ ✓ Charles V. Truax (Democratic) 27.1%; ▌ ✓ Stephen M. Young (Democratic) 26.8%; ▌George H. Bender (Republican) 23.1%; ▌L. L. Marshall (Republican) 22.3%; ▌Ben Atkins (Communist) 0.4%; ▌John Marshall (Communist) 0.4% |
| Ohio at-large | Stephen M. Young | Democratic | 1932 | Incumbent re-elected. | ▌ ✓ Charles V. Truax (Democratic) 27.1%; ▌ ✓ Stephen M. Young (Democratic) 26.8%; ▌George H. Bender (Republican) 23.1%; ▌L. L. Marshall (Republican) 22.3%; ▌Ben Atkins (Communist) 0.4%; ▌John Marshall (Communist) 0.4% |

== Oklahoma ==
| District | Incumbent | | | This race | |
| District | Member | Party | First elected | Results | Candidates |
|---|---|---|---|---|---|
| Oklahoma 1 | Wesley E. Disney | Democratic | 1930 | Incumbent re-elected. | ▌ ✓ Wesley E. Disney (Democratic) 60.1%; ▌Robert W. Kellough (Republican) 38.2%; ▌V. D. Fowler (Socialist) 1.6% |
| Oklahoma 2 | William Wirt Hastings | Democratic | 1922 | Incumbent retired. Democratic hold. | ▌ ✓ John C. Nichols (Democratic) 62.2%; ▌C. E. Creager (Republican) 37.1%; ▌Morton E. Craig (Socialist) 0.6% |
| Oklahoma 3 | Wilburn Cartwright | Democratic | 1926 | Incumbent re-elected. | ▌ ✓ Wilburn Cartwright (Democratic) 76.9%; ▌John D. Morrison (Republican) 21.7%; ▌Robert E. Lee (Socialist) 1.4% |
| Oklahoma 4 | Tom D. McKeown | Democratic | 1922 | Incumbent lost renomination. Democratic hold. | ▌ ✓ Percy Lee Gassaway (Democratic) 67.6%; ▌James S. Davidson (Republican) 28.5%; ▌Allen C. Adams (Socialist) 3.9%; ▌E. W. Whitney (Independent) 0.08% |
| Oklahoma 5 | Fletcher B. Swank | Democratic | 1930 | Incumbent lost renomination. Democratic hold. | ▌ ✓ Joshua B. Lee (Democratic) 74.6%; ▌Paul Huston (Republican) 23.9%; ▌J. T. Bays (Socialist) 1.4%; ▌James W. Hill (Independent) 0.07% |
| Oklahoma 6 | Jed Johnson | Democratic | 1926 | Incumbent re-elected. | ▌ ✓ Jed Johnson (Democratic) 67.2%; ▌George E. Young (Republican) 27.8%; ▌J. W. Madison (Socialist) 5.0% |
| Oklahoma 7 | James V. McClintic | Democratic | 1914 | Incumbent lost renomination. Democratic hold. | ▌ ✓ Sam C. Massingale (Democratic) 76.0%; ▌Fred Langley (Republican) 17.7%; ▌Orville E. Enfield (Socialist) 6.2% |
| Oklahoma 8 | E. W. Marland | Democratic | 1932 | Incumbent retired to run for Governor of Oklahoma. Democratic hold. | ▌ ✓ Phil Ferguson (Democratic) 56.8%; ▌T. J. Sargent (Republican) 42.4%; ▌Siegfried Ameringer (Socialist) 0.8%; ▌Boyd Northcutt (Independent) 0.06% |
| Oklahoma at-large | Will Rogers | Democratic | 1932 | Incumbent re-elected. | ▌ ✓ Will Rogers (Democratic) 66.8%; ▌U. S. Stone (Republican) 30.7%; ▌Edgar Cleamons (Socialist) 2.3%; ▌E. B. Sandfort (Independent) 0.08% |

== Oregon ==
| District | Incumbent | | | This race | |
| District | Member | Party | First elected | Results | Candidates |
|---|---|---|---|---|---|
| Oregon 1 | James W. Mott | Republican | 1932 | Incumbent re-elected. | ▌ ✓ James W. Mott (Republican) 49.8%; ▌R. R. Turner (Democratic) 38.1%; ▌Emmett W. Gulley (Independent) 9.6%; ▌W. S. Richards (Socialist) 2.4% |
| Oregon 2 | Walter M. Pierce | Democratic | 1932 | Incumbent re-elected. | ▌ ✓ Walter M. Pierce (Democratic) 56.7%; ▌Jay H. Upton (Republican) 41.3%; ▌O. D. Teel (Socialist) 2.0% |
| Oregon 3 | Charles H. Martin | Democratic | 1930 | Incumbent retired to run for Governor of Oregon. Republican gain. | ▌ ✓ William A. Ekwall (Republican) 41.1%; ▌Walter B. Gleason (Democratic) 38.5%; ▌Andrew C. Smith (Independent) 9.3%; ▌Albert Streiff (Socialist) 4.1%; ▌J. E. Bennett (Independent) 3.1%; ▌Grace Wick (Independent) 1.8%; ▌Philip Ickler (Independent) 1.2%; ▌Louis Olson (Independent) 1.0% |

== Pennsylvania ==
| District | Incumbent | | | This race | |
| District | Member | Party | First elected | Results | Candidates |
|---|---|---|---|---|---|
| Pennsylvania 1 | Harry C. Ransley | Republican | 1920 | Incumbent re-elected. | ▌ ✓ Harry C. Ransley (Republican) 52.1%; ▌Joseph Marinelli (Democratic) 47.2%; ▌Gamshei Kutlikoff (Socialist) 0.4%; ▌Morris H. Wickman (Communist) 0.3% |
| Pennsylvania 2 | James M. Beck | Republican | 1927 (special) | Incumbent resigned. Republican hold. | ▌ ✓ William H. Wilson (Republican) 54.7%; ▌James P. McGranery (Democratic) 44.5%; ▌Harriet Norris (Socialist) 0.6%; ▌Joseph Mackie (Prohibition) 0.2% |
| Pennsylvania 3 | Alfred M. Waldron | Republican | 1932 | Incumbent retired. Republican hold. | ▌ ✓ Clare G. Fenerty (Republican) 52.0%; ▌Michael J. Bradley (Democratic) 46.8%; ▌Alfred M. Waldron (Industrial Recovery) 0.6%; ▌Joseph Kazmark (Socialist) 0.5%; ▌Rose E. Landberg (Progressive) 0.1% |
| Pennsylvania 4 | George W. Edmonds | Republican | 1932 | Incumbent lost re-election. Democratic gain. | ▌ ✓ J. Burrwood Daly (Democratic) 49.6%; ▌George W. Edmonds (Republican) 49.2%; ▌William Eckel (Socialist) 0.7%; ▌Sterling T. Rochester (Communist) 0.4%; ▌Charles Fred White (Progressive) 0.08% |
| Pennsylvania 5 | James J. Connolly | Republican | 1920 | Incumbent lost re-election. Democratic gain. | ▌ ✓ Frank J. G. Dorsey (Democratic) 52.2%; ▌James J. Connolly (Republican) 46.7%; ▌Warren D. Mullin (Socialist) 1.0%; ▌Arthur Braun (Communist) 0.2% |
| Pennsylvania 6 | Edward L. Stokes | Republican | 1931 (special) | Retired to run for Governor of Pennsylvania. Democratic gain. | ▌ ✓ Michael J. Stack (Democratic) 50.8%; ▌Robert L. Davis (Republican) 48.2%; ▌John P. Innerarity (Socialist) 0.6%; ▌Ben Gardner (Communist) 0.2%; ▌Romain C. Hassrick (Prohibition) 0.2%; ▌Benjamin J. Spang (Progressive) 0.06% |
| Pennsylvania 7 | George P. Darrow | Republican | 1914 | Incumbent re-elected. | ▌ ✓ George P. Darrow (Republican) 52.7%; ▌James C. Crumlish (Democratic) 46.4%; ▌Joseph Doerr (Socialist) 0.7%; ▌T. Henry Walnut (Prohibition) 0.1%; ▌William F. Kane (Progressive) 0.08% |
| Pennsylvania 8 | James Wolfenden | Republican | 1928 | Incumbent re-elected. | ▌ ✓ James Wolfenden (Republican) 57.2%; ▌John E. McDonough (Democratic) 41.3%; ▌Edward B. Rawson (Socialist) 1.0%; ▌C. Wilfred Conard (Prohibition) 0.6% |
| Pennsylvania 9 | Oliver W. Frey | Democratic | 1933 (special) | Incumbent re-elected. | ▌ ✓ Oliver W. Frey (Democratic) 50.2%; ▌Theodore R. Gardner (Republican) 47.6%; ▌Walter L. Huhn (Socialist) 1.6%; ▌Manda M. Horlacker (Prohibition) 0.4%; ▌Steven Pukanecz (Communist) 0.2% |
| Pennsylvania 10 | J. Roland Kinzer | Republican | 1930 | Incumbent re-elected. | ▌ ✓ J. Roland Kinzer (Republican) 57.6%; ▌Charles T. Carpenter (Democratic) 41.7%; ▌William W. Halligan (Socialist) 0.7% |
| Pennsylvania 11 | Patrick J. Boland | Democratic | 1930 | Incumbent re-elected. | ▌ ✓ Patrick J. Boland (Democratic) 98.1%; ▌Edwin S. Williams (Prohibition) 1.5%; ▌Joseph Dougher (Communist) 0.4% |
| Pennsylvania 12 | C. Murray Turpin | Republican | 1929 (special) | Incumbent re-elected. | ▌ ✓ C. Murray Turpin (Republican) 51.4%; ▌John J. Casey (Democratic) 48.0%; ▌Judson N. Bailey (Prohibition) 0.5%; ▌John A. Muldowney (Communist) 0.2% |
| Pennsylvania 13 | George F. Brumm | Republican | 1928 | Incumbent died. Democratic gain. | ▌ ✓ James H. Gildea (Democratic) 50.1%; ▌David W. Bechtel (Republican) 45.7%; ▌Susan I. Brumm (Equal Rights) 2.7%; ▌Leo Sitko (Socialist) 1.3%; ▌Edith L. Reed (Prohibition) 0.3% |
| Pennsylvania 14 | William E. Richardson | Democratic | 1932 | Incumbent re-elected. | ▌ ✓ William E. Richardson (Democratic) 63.3%; ▌Raymond S. Hofses (Socialist) 32.2%; ▌Robert S. MacDonough (Independent) 4.5% |
| Pennsylvania 15 | Louis T. McFadden | Republican | 1914 | Incumbent lost re-election. Democratic gain. | ▌ ✓ Charles E. Dietrich (Democratic) 50.1%; ▌Louis T. McFadden (Republican) 49.3%; ▌Henry L. Springer (Socialist) 0.5% |
| Pennsylvania 16 | Robert F. Rich | Republican | 1930 | Incumbent re-elected. | ▌ ✓ Robert F. Rich (Republican) 53.0%; ▌Paul A. Rothfuss (Democratic) 44.4%; ▌George L. Reeder (Peoples) 1.7%; ▌Robert I. Fisher (Socialist) 0.9% |
| Pennsylvania 17 | J. William Ditter | Republican | 1932 | Incumbent re-elected. | ▌ ✓ J. William Ditter (Republican) 56.2%; ▌Howard J. Dager (Democratic) 42.0%; ▌George W. Bause (Socialist) 1.3%; ▌Raymond J. Keisen (Prohibition) 0.5% |
| Pennsylvania 18 | Benjamin K. Focht | Republican | 1932 | Incumbent re-elected. | ▌ ✓ Benjamin K. Focht (Republican) 55.6%; ▌B. Stiles Duncan (Democratic) 44.4% |
| Pennsylvania 19 | Isaac H. Doutrich | Republican | 1926 | Incumbent re-elected. | ▌ ✓ Isaac H. Doutrich (Republican) 55.1%; ▌Forrest Mercer (Democratic) 42.9%; ▌Irving J. Noon (Socialist) 0.9%; ▌Ida G. Kast (Prohibition) 0.9%; ▌Albert W. Penner (Independent) 0.1% |
| Pennsylvania 20 | Thomas Cunningham Cochran | Republican | 1926 | Incumbent retired. Democratic gain. | ▌ ✓ Denis J. Driscoll (Democratic) 52.7%; ▌Leon H. Gavin (Republican) 43.7%; ▌Robert G. Burnham (Prohibition) 2.8%; ▌Robert S. Stewart (Socialist) 0.8% |
| Pennsylvania 21 | Francis E. Walter | Democratic | 1932 | Incumbent re-elected. | ▌ ✓ Francis E. Walter (Democratic) 58.7%; ▌T. Fred Woodley (Republican) 40.0%; ▌Simon R. Hartzell (Socialist) 1.3% |
| Pennsylvania 22 | Harry L. Haines | Democratic | 1930 | Incumbent re-elected. | ▌ ✓ Harry L. Haines (Democratic) 54.6%; ▌Emanuel C. Beck (Republican) 43.7%; ▌William P. Gemmil (Prohibition) 1.0%; ▌Harry Boeckel (Socialist) 0.8% |
| Pennsylvania 23 | J. Banks Kurtz | Republican | 1922 | Incumbent lost re-election. Democratic gain. | ▌ ✓ Don Gingery (Democratic) 52.4%; ▌J. Banks Kurtz (Republican) 44.2%; ▌George W. Hartman (Socialist) 3.4% |
| Pennsylvania 24 | J. Buell Snyder | Democratic | 1932 | Incumbent re-elected. | ▌ ✓ J. Buell Snyder (Democratic) 57.3%; ▌Paul H. Griffith (Republican) 42.0%; ▌Charles H. Musgrove (Socialist) 0.6%; ▌Victor Dellarose (Communist) 0.2% |
| Pennsylvania 25 | Charles I. Faddis | Democratic | 1932 | Incumbent re-elected. | ▌ ✓ Charles I. Faddis (Democratic) 59.4%; ▌Albert S. Sickman (Republican) 38.6%; ▌Huber Ferguson (Prohibition) 1.7%; ▌Fred Siders (Communist) 0.4% |
| Pennsylvania 26 | J. Howard Swick | Republican | 1926 | Incumbent lost re-election. Democratic gain. | ▌ ✓ Charles R. Eckert (Democratic) 59.1%; ▌J. Howard Swick (Republican) 40.0%; ▌Charles Baldwin (Socialist) 0.9% |
| Pennsylvania 27 | Nathan L. Strong | Republican | 1916 | Incumbent lost re-election. Democratic gain. | ▌ ✓ Joseph Anthony Gray (Democratic) 54.4%; ▌Nathan Leroy Strong (Republican) 44.5%; ▌Finley S. Goldthwaite (Socialist) 1.1% |
| Pennsylvania 28 | William M. Berlin | Democratic | 1932 | Incumbent re-elected. | ▌ ✓ William M. Berlin (Democratic) 92.5%; ▌S. W. Bierer (Prohibition) 3.8%; ▌Morris Mallinger (Socialist) 3.8% |
| Pennsylvania 29 | Charles N. Crosby | Democratic | 1932 | Incumbent re-elected. | ▌ ✓ Charles N. Crosby (Democratic) 52.5%; ▌Will Rose (Republican) 45.6%; ▌Ralph W. Tillotson (Socialist) 0.9%; ▌Frank H. Selden (Prohibition) 0.9%; ▌Leo Mittelmeier (Communist) 0.2% |
| Pennsylvania 30 | J. Twing Brooks | Democratic | 1932 | Incumbent re-elected. | ▌ ✓ J. Twing Brooks (Democratic) 53.4%; ▌Edmund F. Erk (Republican) 45.0%; ▌Sarah Z. Limbach (Socialist) 1.1%; ▌William G. Hohman (Prohibition) 0.5% |
| Pennsylvania 31 | M. Clyde Kelly | Republican | 1916 | Incumbent lost re-election. Democratic gain. | ▌ ✓ James L. Quinn (Democratic) 52.4%; ▌M. Clyde Kelly (Republican) 45.6%; ▌William Adams (Socialist) 1.3%; ▌Laura Jane Grubbs (Communist) 0.7% |
| Pennsylvania 32 | Michael J. Muldowney | Republican | 1932 | Incumbent lost re-election. Democratic gain. | ▌ ✓ Theodore L. Moritz (Democratic) 43.6%; ▌Michael J. Muldowney (Republican) 34.4%; ▌Alexander Schullman (Independent) 15.2%; ▌Anne E. Felix (Honest Elections) 5.2%; ▌James H. Hueston Sr. (Socialist) 1.0%; ▌Ben Careathers (Communist) 0.6% |
| Pennsylvania 33 | Henry Ellenbogen | Democratic | 1932 | Incumbent re-elected. | ▌ ✓ Henry Ellenbogen (Democratic) 95.3%; ▌Loudoun L. Campbell (Independent) 2.1%; ▌Frank A. Van Essen (Socialist) 1.9%; ▌George Harger (Prohibition) 0.8% |
| Pennsylvania 34 | Matthew A. Dunn | Democratic | 1932 | Incumbent re-elected. | ▌ ✓ Matthew A. Dunn (Democratic) 89.2%; ▌Guy E. Campbell (Republican) 6.8%; ▌John W. Slayton Sr. (Socialist) 1.8%; ▌Charles R. Murray (Ind Cit) 1.4%; ▌Louis C. Clark (Prohibition) 0.8% |

== Rhode Island ==
| District | Incumbent | | | This race | |
| District | Member | Party | First elected | Results | Candidates |
|---|---|---|---|---|---|
| Rhode Island 1 | Francis Condon | Democratic | 1930 | Incumbent re-elected. | ▌ ✓ Francis Condon (Democratic) 59.0%; ▌John C. Cosseboom (Republican) 41.0% |
| Rhode Island 2 | John M. O'Connell | Democratic | 1932 | Incumbent re-elected. | ▌ ✓ John M. O'Connell (Democratic) 55.8%; ▌George C. Clark (Republican) 44.2% |

== South Carolina ==
| District | Incumbent | | | This race | |
| District | Member | Party | First elected | Results | Candidates |
|---|---|---|---|---|---|
| South Carolina 1 | Thomas S. McMillan | Democratic | 1924 | Incumbent re-elected. | ▌ ✓ Thomas S. McMillan (Democratic) 97.7%; ▌George W. Beckett (Republican) 2.3% |
| South Carolina 2 | Hampton P. Fulmer | Democratic | 1920 | Incumbent re-elected. | ▌ ✓ Hampton P. Fulmer (Democratic) 99.2%; ▌D. A. Gardner (Republican) 0.8% |
| South Carolina 3 | John C. Taylor | Democratic | 1932 | Incumbent re-elected. | ▌ ✓ John C. Taylor (Democratic) 99.4%; ▌T. Frank McCord (Republican) 0.6% |
| South Carolina 4 | John J. McSwain | Democratic | 1920 | Incumbent re-elected. | ▌ ✓ John J. McSwain (Democratic) 99.4%; ▌Frank W. Faux (Republican) 0.6% |
| South Carolina 5 | James P. Richards | Democratic | 1932 | Incumbent re-elected. | ▌ ✓ James P. Richards (Democratic) 98.7%; ▌C. F. Pendleton (Republican) 1.3% |
| South Carolina 6 | Allard H. Gasque | Democratic | 1922 | Incumbent re-elected. | ▌ ✓ Allard H. Gasque (Democratic) 99.3%; ▌T. J. Karnes (Republican) 0.7% |

== South Dakota ==
| District | Incumbent | | | This race | |
| District | Member | Party | First elected | Results | Candidates |
|---|---|---|---|---|---|
| South Dakota 1 | Fred H. Hildebrandt | Democratic | 1932 | Incumbent re-elected. | ▌ ✓ Fred H. Hildebrandt (Democratic) 58.5%; ▌Charles A. Christopherson (Republican) 40.4%; ▌C. H. Sharp (Independent) 1.1% |
| South Dakota 2 | Theodore B. Werner | Democratic | 1932 | Incumbent re-elected. | ▌ ✓ Theodore B. Werner (Democratic) 52.5%; ▌Francis Case (Republican) 47.5% |

== Tennessee ==
| District | Incumbent | | | This race | |
| District | Member | Party | First elected | Results | Candidates |
|---|---|---|---|---|---|
| Tennessee 1 | B. Carroll Reece | Republican | 1932 | Incumbent re-elected. | ▌ ✓ B. Carroll Reece (Republican) 56.8%; ▌W. A. S. Furlow (Democratic) 35.2%; ▌Nat G. Taylor (Independent) 3.8%; ▌D. R. Smalling (Independent) 3.1%; ▌L. C. Grigsby (Independent) 1.1% |
| Tennessee 2 | J. Will Taylor | Republican | 1918 | Incumbent re-elected. | ▌ ✓ J. Will Taylor (Republican) 58.7%; ▌T. C. Drinnen (Democratic) 22.2%; ▌E. E. Patton (Independent) 16.2%; ▌Charles M. Wallace (Independent) 2.1%; ▌Calvin Rutherford (Independent) 0.8% |
| Tennessee 3 | Sam D. McReynolds | Democratic | 1922 | Incumbent re-elected. | ▌ ✓ Sam D. McReynolds (Democratic) 60.0%; ▌Pat H. Thatch (Republican) 40.0% |
| Tennessee 4 | John Ridley Mitchell | Democratic | 1930 | Incumbent re-elected. | ▌ ✓ John Ridley Mitchell (Democratic) 78.4%; ▌H. E. McLean (Republican) 21.6% |
| Tennessee 5 | Jo Byrns | Democratic | 1908 | Incumbent re-elected. | ▌ ✓ Jo Byrns (Democratic) Uncontested |
| Tennessee 6 | Clarence W. Turner | Democratic | 1932 | Incumbent re-elected. | ▌ ✓ Clarence W. Turner (Democratic) Uncontested |
| Tennessee 7 | Gordon Browning | Democratic | 1922 | Retired to run for U.S. senator. Democratic hold. | ▌ ✓ Herron C. Pearson (Democratic) Uncontested |
| Tennessee 8 | Jere Cooper | Democratic | 1928 | Incumbent re-elected. | ▌ ✓ Jere Cooper (Democratic) Uncontested |
| Tennessee 9 | E. H. Crump | Democratic | 1930 | Incumbent retired. Democratic hold. | ▌ ✓ Walter Chandler (Democratic) Uncontested |

== Texas ==
| District | Incumbent | | | This race | |
| District | Member | Party | First elected | Results | Candidates |
|---|---|---|---|---|---|
| Texas 1 | Wright Patman | Democratic | 1928 | Incumbent re-elected. | ▌ ✓ Wright Patman (Democratic) Uncontested |
| Texas 2 | Martin Dies Jr. | Democratic | 1930 | Incumbent re-elected. | ▌ ✓ Martin Dies Jr. (Democratic) Uncontested |
| Texas 3 | Morgan G. Sanders | Democratic | 1920 | Incumbent re-elected. | ▌ ✓ Morgan G. Sanders (Democratic) Uncontested |
| Texas 4 | Sam Rayburn | Democratic | 1912 | Incumbent re-elected. | ▌ ✓ Sam Rayburn (Democratic) Uncontested |
| Texas 5 | Hatton W. Sumners | Democratic | 1914 | Incumbent re-elected. | ▌ ✓ Hatton W. Sumners (Democratic) Uncontested |
| Texas 5 | Sterling P. Strong; Redistricted from the at-large seat | Democratic | 1932 | Incumbent lost renomination. Democratic loss. | ▌ ✓ Hatton W. Sumners (Democratic) Uncontested |
| Texas 5 | Joseph W. Bailey Jr. Redistricted from the at-large seat | Democratic | 1932 | Incumbent retired to run for U.S. senator. Democratic loss. | ▌ ✓ Hatton W. Sumners (Democratic) Uncontested |
| Texas 6 | Luther A. Johnson | Democratic | 1922 | Incumbent re-elected. | ▌ ✓ Luther A. Johnson (Democratic) Uncontested |
| Texas 7 | Clark W. Thompson | Democratic | 1933 (special) | Incumbent retired. Democratic hold. | ▌ ✓ Nat Patton (Democratic) Uncontested |
| Texas 7 | George B. Terrell; Redistricted from the at-large seat | Democratic | 1932 | Incumbent retired. Democratic loss. | ▌ ✓ Nat Patton (Democratic) Uncontested |
| Texas 8 | Joe H. Eagle | Democratic | 1933 (special) | Incumbent re-elected. | ▌ ✓ Joe H. Eagle (Democratic) Uncontested |
| Texas 9 | Joseph J. Mansfield | Democratic | 1916 | Incumbent re-elected. | ▌ ✓ Joseph J. Mansfield (Democratic) Uncontested |
| Texas 10 | James P. Buchanan | Democratic | 1912 | Incumbent re-elected. | ▌ ✓ James P. Buchanan (Democratic) Uncontested |
| Texas 11 | Oliver H. Cross | Democratic | 1928 | Incumbent re-elected. | ▌ ✓ Oliver H. Cross (Democratic) Uncontested |
| Texas 12 | Fritz G. Lanham | Democratic | 1919 (special) | Incumbent re-elected. | ▌ ✓ Fritz G. Lanham (Democratic) Uncontested |
| Texas 13 | William D. McFarlane | Democratic | 1932 | Incumbent re-elected. | ▌ ✓ William D. McFarlane (Democratic) Uncontested |
| Texas 14 | Richard M. Kleberg | Democratic | 1931 (special) | Incumbent re-elected. | ▌ ✓ Richard M. Kleberg (Democratic) Uncontested |
| Texas 15 | Milton H. West | Democratic | 1933 (special) | Incumbent re-elected. | ▌ ✓ Milton H. West (Democratic) Uncontested |
| Texas 16 | R. Ewing Thomason | Democratic | 1930 | Incumbent re-elected. | ▌ ✓ R. Ewing Thomason (Democratic) Uncontested |
| Texas 17 | Thomas L. Blanton | Democratic | 1930 | Incumbent re-elected. | ▌ ✓ Thomas L. Blanton (Democratic) Uncontested |
| Texas 18 | John Marvin Jones | Democratic | 1916 | Incumbent re-elected. | ▌ ✓ John Marvin Jones (Democratic) Uncontested |
| Texas 19 | None (new district) | | | New seat. Democratic gain. | ▌ ✓ George H. Mahon (Democratic) Uncontested |
| Texas 20 | None (new district) | | | New seat. Democratic gain. | ▌ ✓ Maury Maverick (Democratic) Uncontested |
| Texas 21 | None (new district) | | | New seat. Democratic gain. | ▌ ✓ Charles L. South (Democratic) Uncontested |

== Utah ==
| District | Incumbent | | | This race | |
| District | Member | Party | First elected | Results | Candidates |
|---|---|---|---|---|---|
| Utah 1 | Abe Murdock | Democratic | 1932 | Incumbent re-elected. | ▌ ✓ Abe Murdock (Democratic) 64.4%; ▌Arthur Woolley (Republican) 34.5%; ▌William J. McConnell (Socialist) 0.7%; ▌Lawrence Mower (Communist) 0.3% |
| Utah 2 | J. W. Robinson | Democratic | 1932 | Incumbent re-elected. | ▌ ✓ J. W. Robinson (Democratic) 62.3%; ▌Frederick C. Loofbourow (Republican) 36.4%; ▌Carl Bjork (Communist) 0.8%; ▌A. L. Porter (Socialist) 0.4% |

== Vermont ==
| District | Incumbent | | | This race | |
| District | Member | Party | First elected | Results | Candidates |
|---|---|---|---|---|---|
| Vermont at-large | Charles A. Plumley | Republican | 1934 (special) | Incumbent re-elected. | ▌ ✓ Charles A. Plumley (Republican) 56.9%; ▌Carroll E. Jenkins (Democratic) 42.4%; ▌John A. Rivers (Socialist) 0.7% |

== Virginia ==
| District | Incumbent | | | This race | |
| District | Member | Party | First elected | Results | Candidates |
|---|---|---|---|---|---|
| Virginia 1 | S. Otis Bland; Redistricted from the at-large seat | Democratic | 1918 | Incumbent re-elected. | ▌ ✓ S. Otis Bland (Democratic) 91.5%; ▌Arthur W. Showalter (Socialist) 4.9%; ▌W. A. Rowe (Independent) 2.9%; ▌Addison Gayle (Communist) 0.8% |
| Virginia 2 | Colgate Darden; Redistricted from the at-large seat | Democratic | 1932 | Incumbent re-elected. | ▌ ✓ Colgate Darden (Democratic) 76.2%; ▌Gerould M. Rumble (Republican) 22.8%; ▌George Roulsen (Socialist) 0.6%; ▌Herbert S. Carrington (Communist) 0.5% |
| Virginia 3 | Jack Montague; Redistricted from the at-large seat | Democratic | 1912 | Incumbent re-elected. | ▌ ✓ Jack Montague (Democratic) 80.5%; ▌Roy C. Parks (Republican) 17.6%; ▌Hilliard Bernstein (Socialist) 1.0%; ▌William H. Friend (Communist) 0.9% |
| Virginia 4 | Patrick H. Drewry; Redistricted from the at-large seat | Democratic | 1920 | Incumbent re-elected. | ▌ ✓ Patrick H. Drewry (Democratic) 93.4%; ▌Daniel Killinger (Socialist) 3.9%; ▌Mary Frances Leslie (Independent) 2.7% |
| Virginia 5 | Thomas G. Burch; Redistricted from the at-large seat | Democratic | 1930 | Incumbent re-elected. | ▌ ✓ Thomas G. Burch (Democratic) 88.2%; ▌Henry P. Wilder (Independent) 8.6%; ▌Ira C. Wentz (Socialist) 3.2% |
| Virginia 6 | Clifton A. Woodrum; Redistricted from the at-large seat | Democratic | 1922 | Incumbent re-elected. | ▌ ✓ Clifton A. Woodrum (Democratic) 67.1%; ▌Thomas J. Wilson Jr. (Republican) 31.6%; ▌W. L. Gibson (Socialist) 0.7%; ▌John Moffett Robinson (Independent) 0.5% |
| Virginia 7 | A. Willis Robertson; Redistricted from the at-large seat | Democratic | 1932 | Incumbent re-elected. | ▌ ✓ A. Willis Robertson (Democratic) 68.3%; ▌J. Everett Will (Republican) 30.1%; ▌Lester Ruffner (Socialist) 1.3%; ▌W. R. Eubank (Independent) 0.3% |
| Virginia 8 | Howard W. Smith; Redistricted from the at-large seat | Democratic | 1930 | Incumbent re-elected. | ▌ ✓ Howard W. Smith (Democratic) 78.9%; ▌John Locke Green (Republican) 19.9%; ▌F. A. Shelton (Socialist) 1.1% |
| Virginia 9 | John W. Flannagan Jr. Redistricted from the at-large seat | Democratic | 1930 | Incumbent re-elected. | ▌ ✓ John W. Flannagan Jr. (Democratic) 58.1%; ▌Fred C. Parks (Republican) 35.0%; ▌Bruce Crawford (Independent) 6.8%; ▌G. Louis Millirons (Socialist) 0.2% |

== Washington ==
| District | Incumbent | | | This race | |
| District | Member | Party | First elected | Results | Candidates |
|---|---|---|---|---|---|
| Washington 1 | Marion Zioncheck | Democratic | 1932 | Incumbent re-elected. | ▌ ✓ Marion Zioncheck (Democratic) 57.7%; ▌Bert C. Ross (Republican) 32.3%; ▌Cecil R. Fuller (Cincinnatus) 7.2%; ▌Willman K. Garrison (Socialist) 2.1%; ▌James Murphy (Communist) 0.7% |
| Washington 2 | Monrad Wallgren | Democratic | 1932 | Incumbent re-elected. | ▌ ✓ Monrad Wallgren (Democratic) 67.0%; ▌Payson Peterson (Republican) 31.4%; ▌Peter Woitulewicz (Socialist) 1.6%; ▌Elmer F. Allan (Communist) 0.01% |
| Washington 3 | Martin F. Smith | Democratic | 1932 | Incumbent re-elected. | ▌ ✓ Martin F. Smith (Democratic) 69.2%; ▌Russell V. Mack (Republican) 30.8% |
| Washington 4 | Knute Hill | Democratic | 1932 | Incumbent re-elected. | ▌ ✓ Knute Hill (Democratic) 56.4%; ▌John W. Summers (Republican) 43.6% |
| Washington 5 | Samuel B. Hill | Democratic | 1923 (special) | Incumbent re-elected. | ▌ ✓ Samuel B. Hill (Democratic) 76.2%; ▌Mansfield E. Mack (Socialist) 23.8% |
| Washington 6 | Wesley Lloyd | Democratic | 1932 | Incumbent re-elected. | ▌ ✓ Wesley Lloyd (Democratic) 70.5%; ▌Emery Asbury (Republican) 29.5% |

== West Virginia ==
| District | Incumbent | | | This race | |
| District | Member | Party | First elected | Results | Candidates |
|---|---|---|---|---|---|
| West Virginia 1 | Robert L. Ramsay | Democratic | 1932 | Incumbent re-elected. | ▌ ✓ Robert L. Ramsay (Democratic) 53.3%; ▌Carl G. Bachmann (Republican) 45.9%; ▌H. W. Carpenter (Prohibition) 0.8% |
| West Virginia 2 | Jennings Randolph | Democratic | 1932 | Incumbent re-elected. | ▌ ✓ Jennings Randolph (Democratic) 57.6%; ▌Herbert E. Hannis (Republican) 42.0%; ▌N. Rice (Prohibition) 0.4% |
| West Virginia 3 | Andrew Edmiston Jr. | Democratic | 1933 (special) | Incumbent re-elected. | ▌ ✓ Andrew Edmiston Jr. (Democratic) 53.6%; ▌James A. Rusmisell (Republican) 45.9%; ▌J. C. Ramsay (Prohibition) 0.5% |
| West Virginia 4 | George W. Johnson | Democratic | 1932 | Incumbent re-elected. | ▌ ✓ George W. Johnson (Democratic) 50.4%; ▌Robert B. McDougle (Republican) 49.0%; ▌Osie England (Prohibition) 0.5% |
| West Virginia 5 | John Kee | Democratic | 1932 | Incumbent re-elected. | ▌ ✓ John Kee (Democratic) 58.5%; ▌C. M. Jones (Republican) 41.3%; ▌C. W. Duling (Prohibition) 0.2% |
| West Virginia 6 | Joe L. Smith | Democratic | 1928 | Incumbent re-elected. | ▌ ✓ Joe L. Smith (Democratic) 61.4%; ▌Frank C. Burdette (Republican) 38.3%; ▌B. H. White (Prohibition) 0.3% |

== Wisconsin ==
| District | Incumbent | | | This race | |
| District | Member | Party | First elected | Results | Candidates |
|---|---|---|---|---|---|
| Wisconsin 1 | George W. Blanchard | Republican | 1932 | Incumbent retired. Progressive gain. | ▌ ✓ Thomas Ryum Amlie (Progressive) 37.4%; ▌Judson W. Staplecamp (Republican) 32.9%; ▌Ralph V. Brown (Democratic) 27.2%; ▌Frank S. Symmonds (Social-Democratic) 2.6% |
| Wisconsin 2 | Charles W. Henney | Democratic | 1932 | Incumbent lost re-election. Progressive gain. | ▌ ✓ Harry Sauthoff (Progressive) 41.8%; ▌Charles W. Henney (Democratic) 33.6%; ▌John B. Gay (Republican) 23.2%; ▌Clifford O. Wescott (Social-Democratic) 1.5% |
| Wisconsin 3 | Gardner R. Withrow | Republican | 1920 | Incumbent re-elected as a Progressive. Progressive gain. | ▌ ✓ Gardner R. Withrow (Progressive) 52.1%; ▌Levi H. Bancroft (Republican) 28.5%; ▌Bart E. McGonigle (Democratic) 19.0%; ▌Frank Driefke (Social-Democratic) 0.5% |
| Wisconsin 4 | Raymond J. Cannon | Democratic | 1932 | Incumbent re-elected. | ▌ ✓ Raymond J. Cannon (Democratic) 38.6%; ▌John C. Schafer (Republican) 22.6%; ▌Marvin V. Baxter (Social-Democratic) 20.7%; ▌Laurence C. Gram (Progressive) 17.5%; ▌Harold Hartley (Ind. Communist) 0.7% |
| Wisconsin 5 | Thomas O'Malley | Democratic | 1932 | Incumbent re-elected. | ▌ ✓ Thomas O'Malley (Democratic) 34.7%; ▌Otto Hauser (Social-Democratic) 24.6%; ▌Arthur T. Spence (Republican) 22.7%; ▌Carl J. Ludwig (Progressive) 17.6%; ▌Fred Basset Blair (Ind. Communist) 0.5% |
| Wisconsin 6 | Michael Reilly | Democratic | 1930 | Incumbent re-elected. | ▌ ✓ Michael Reilly (Democratic) 42.3%; ▌Walter D. Corrigan (Progressive) 34.7%; ▌William J. Campbell (Republican) 23.0% |
| Wisconsin 7 | Gerald J. Boileau | Republican | 1930 | Incumbent re-elected as Progressive. Progressive gain. | ▌ ✓ Gerald J. Boileau (Progressive) 48.5%; ▌Frank D. Chapman (Democratic) 29.2%; ▌Caspar Wallrich (Republican) 20.5%; ▌Lewis Frick (Social-Democratic) 1.8% |
| Wisconsin 8 | James F. Hughes | Democratic | 1932 | Incumbent retired. Progressive gain. | ▌ ✓ George J. Schneider (Progressive) 43.8%; ▌Eugene A. Clifford (Democratic) 38.1%; ▌L. Herman Waite (Republican) 17.5%; ▌Trygve Hansen (Independent) 0.6% |
| Wisconsin 9 | James A. Frear | Republican | 1912 | Incumbent retired. Progressive gain. | ▌ ✓ Merlin Hull (Progressive) 49.6%; ▌Willis E. Donley (Democratic) 24.3%; ▌Knute Anderson (Republican) 23.4%; ▌Paul Boyd (Social-Democratic) 2.7% |
| Wisconsin 10 | Hubert H. Peavey | Republican | 1922 | Incumbent lost re-election. Progressive gain. | ▌ ✓ Bernard J. Gehrmann (Progressive) 35.3%; ▌Hubert H. Peavey (Republican) 29.8%; ▌Charles P. Cadigan (Democratic) 29.6%; ▌Alex Schaufelberger Jr. (Social-Democratic) 4.9%; Others 0.2%; ▌Lawrence Stone (Independent) 0.1% |

== Wyoming ==
| District | Incumbent | | | This race | |
| District | Member | Party | First elected | Results | Candidates |
|---|---|---|---|---|---|
| Wyoming at-large | Vincent Carter | Republican | 1928 | Retired to run for U.S. senator. Democratic gain. | ▌ ✓ Paul R. Greever (Democratic) 58.3%; ▌Charles E. Winter (Republican) 41.0%; ▌Roy E. Hallet (Socialist) 0.5%; ▌George Morphis (Communist) 0.2% |

== Non-voting delegates ==
=== Alaska Territory ===
| District | Incumbent | | | This race | |
| District | Delegate | Party | First elected | Results | Candidates |
|---|---|---|---|---|---|
| Alaska Territory at-large | Anthony Dimond | Democratic | 1932 | Incumbent re-elected. | ▌ ✓ Anthony Dimond (Democratic); Uncontested |

=== Philippines ===
| District | Incumbent | | | This race | |
| District | Delegate | Party | First elected | Results | Candidates |
|---|---|---|---|---|---|
| Philippines at-large | Pedro Guevara | Nacionalista | 1922 | Incumbent re-elected. | ▌ ✓ Pedro Guevara (Nacionalista); Uncontested |

== See also ==
- 1934 United States elections
  - 1934 United States gubernatorial elections
  - 1934 United States Senate elections
- 73rd United States Congress
- 74th United States Congress
