= James G. Morgan =

American politician

Member of the Missouri Senate from the 4th district
- In office elected 1926 – ?

Personal details
- Born: November 15, 1885 Daviess County, Missouri, US
- Died: 1964 (aged 78–79)
- Party: Republican
- Spouse: Hazel Oldfield
- Education: Kirksville State Teachers College
- Occupation: newspaper editor and publisher

James Grover Morgan (November 15, 1885 – 1964) was an American politician from Unionville, Missouri, who served in the Missouri Senate and the Missouri House of Representatives. He served in the Missouri House of Representatives from 1917 until 1922 where he had been majority floor leader in 1921. He was elected to the Missouri Senate in 1926. Morgan was educated in rural Iowa and at Kirksville State Teachers College. He had worked as the editor and publisher of The Unionville Republican.
