= S. Ralph Harlow =

American clergyman

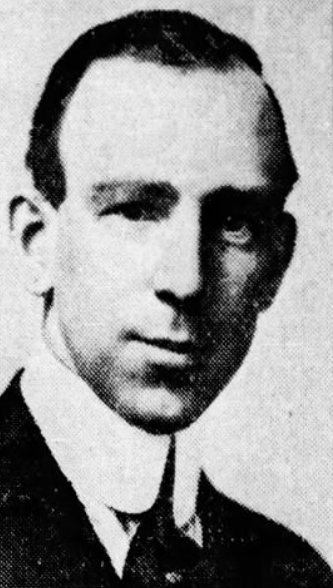
- Born: Samuel Ralph Harlow; 20 July 1885; Boston
- Died: 21 August 1972 (aged 87); Northampton, Massachusetts
- Occupation: Clergyman
- Spouses: Marion Stafford (m. 1912) Elizabeth Grigorakis (m. 1964)

S. Ralph Harlow (20 July 1885 – 21 August 1972) was an American clergyman and Christian missionary to the Middle East.

== Career ==
Harlow was born in Boston. He graduated from Harvard University in 1908 and from Union Theological Seminary in 1912. He obtained an M.A. from Columbia University and a PhD from Hartford Theological Seminary. He was ordained Congregational minister in 1912 and worked for the American Board of Commissioners for Foreign Missions in Smyrna and Turkey. Harlow was Chaplain and Sociology teacher at the International College in Smyrna from 1912-1922. He worked for the Young Men's Christian Association with the American Expeditionary Force in France until 1922. He was a lecturer for the Carnegie Endowment for International Peace.

He joined the faculty of Smith College faculty in 1923 where he was professor of religion for over thirty years. He was a Socialist candidate for the House of Representatives from Northampton, Massachusetts in 1932. Harlow was a friend of Norman Thomas and advocated for a pacifist philosophy. He was a director of the National Association for the Advancement of Colored People and a member of the American Christian Palestine Committee. He held interest in the paranormal and once claimed to have observed floating angels with his wife. He wrote about psychical phenomena from a Christian perspective and was convinced that there was life after death.

In 1953, the Marion and S. Ralph Harlow Scholarship Fund was established for students. Harlow received an honorary degree of Doctor of Humane Letters from the Hebrew Union College in New York. He was one of the few Christians to be honoured by a Jewish institution. Nelson Glueck commented that Harlow "has actively associated himself with Jewish causes, with Israel and its Hebrew University, and without respect to race and creed, has expended in a humble and perceptive way, a warmth of human sympathy".

Harlow died in Northampton, Massachusetts on 21 August 1972, aged 87. He is buried at Abels Hill Cemetery in Massachusetts.

== Personal life ==
Harlow married Marion Stafford in 1912, she died in 1961. They had several children. He married Elizabeth Grigorakis in 1964.

== Selected publications ==
- The Church on a War Basis. American Board of Commissioners for Foreign Missions. 1917.
- Honest Answers to Honest Questions. Abingdon Cokesbury New Press. 1940.
- Thoughts for Times Like These. Philosophical Library. 1957.
- A Life After Death. Doubleday. 1961.
