= Frederick John Groehl =

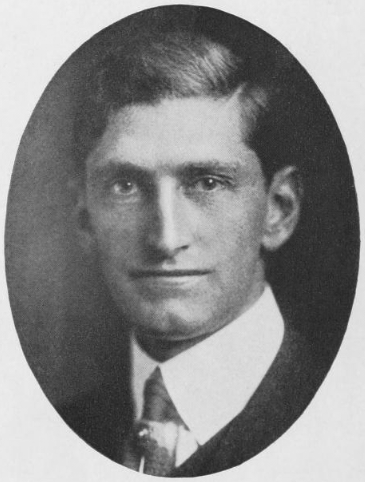
- Born: October 25, 1874; New York, New York, US
- Died: February 21, 1961 (aged 86); New York, New York, US
- Burial place: Corashire Cemetery
- Education: New York University School of Law
- Occupation: Lawyer
- Spouse: May Tisch (m. 1904; died 1927)

Frederick John Groehl (October 25, 1874 – February 21, 1961) was a New York City lawyer and assistant district attorney. He was a prosecutor for the Rosenthal murder case.

== Biography ==
Frederick John Groehl was born in New York City on October 25, 1874. He graduated from New York University School of Law in 1903. He was appointed as assistant district attorney under Charles Seymour Whitman. He married May Tisch on March 2, 1904 in Manhattan, New York City.

He ran for New York's 14th congressional district in 1926 and lost. In 1926 he was the defense attorney for Gerald Chapman.

Groehl's wife took her own life with a gun during a bout of depression on June 24, 1927.

He died at the French Hospital in Manhattan. He was buried in Corashire Cemetery in Monterey, Massachusetts.
