= List of United States representatives in the 73rd Congress =

This is a complete list of United States representatives during the 73rd United States Congress listed by seniority.

As an historical article, the districts and party affiliations listed reflect those during the 73rd Congress (March 4, 1933 – January 3, 1935). Seats and party affiliations on similar lists for other congresses will be different for certain members.

Seniority depends on the date on which members were sworn into office. Since many members are sworn in on the same day, subsequent ranking is based on previous congressional service of the individual and then by alphabetical order by the last name of the representative.

Committee chairmanship in the House is often associated with seniority. However, party leadership is typically not associated with seniority.

Note: The "*" indicates that the representative/delegate may have served one or more non-consecutive terms while in the House of Representatives of the United States Congress.

== U.S. House seniority list ==
U.S. House seniority
Rank	Representative	Party	District	Seniority date (Previous service, if any)	No.# of term(s)	Notes
1	Edward W. Pou	D	NC-04	March 4, 1901	17th term	Dean of the House; Died on April 1, 1934.
2	Adolph J. Sabath	D	IL-05	March 4, 1907	14th term	Dean of the House after Pou died.
3	Joseph W. Byrns Sr.	D	TN-05	March 4, 1909	13th term	
4	Edward T. Taylor	D	CO-04	March 4, 1909	13th term	
5	Robert L. Doughton	D	NC-09	March 4, 1911	12th term	
6	Frederick A. Britten	R	IL-09	March 4, 1913	11th term	Left the House in 1935.
7	James A. Frear	R	WI-09	March 4, 1913	11th term	Left the House in 1935.
8	Carl E. Mapes	R	MI-05	March 4, 1913	11th term	
9	Andrew Jackson Montague	D	VA	March 4, 1913	11th term	
10	James S. Parker	R	NY-29	March 4, 1913	11th term	Died on December 19, 1933.
11	Sam Rayburn	D	TX-04	March 4, 1913	11th term	
12	Hatton W. Sumners	D	TX-05	March 4, 1913	11th term	
13	Allen T. Treadway	R	MA-01	March 4, 1913	11th term	
14	James P. Buchanan	D	TX-10	April 15, 1913	11th term	
15	Carl Vinson	D	GA-06	November 3, 1914	11th term	
16	Edward B. Almon	D	AL-08	March 4, 1915	10th term	Died on June 22, 1933.
17	Isaac Bacharach	R	NJ-02	March 4, 1915	10th term	
18	John G. Cooper	R	OH-19	March 4, 1915	10th term	
19	George P. Darrow	R	PA-07	March 4, 1915	10th term	
20	Cassius C. Dowell	R	IA-06	March 4, 1915	10th term	Left the House in 1935.
21	George Huddleston	D	AL-09	March 4, 1915	10th term	
22	W. Frank James	R	MI-12	March 4, 1915	10th term	Left the House in 1935.
23	Frederick R. Lehlbach	R	NJ-12	March 4, 1915	10th term	
24	James V. McClintic	D	OK-07	March 4, 1915	10th term	Left the House in 1935.
25	Louis Thomas McFadden	R	PA-15	March 4, 1915	10th term	Left the House in 1935.
26	William Bacon Oliver	D	AL-06	March 4, 1915	10th term	
27	Henry B. Steagall	D	AL-03	March 4, 1915	10th term	
28	George H. Tinkham	R	MA-10	March 4, 1915	10th term	
29	Henry Winfield Watson	R	PA-09	March 4, 1915	10th term	Died on August 27, 1933.
30	Riley J. Wilson	D	LA-05	March 4, 1915	10th term	
31	Bertrand Snell	R	NY-31	November 2, 1915	10th term	
32	William B. Bankhead	D	AL-07	March 4, 1917	9th term	
33	Charles Hillyer Brand	D	GA-10	March 4, 1917	9th term	Died on May 17, 1933.
34	John Marvin Jones	D	TX-18	March 4, 1917	9th term	
35	Melville Clyde Kelly	R	PA-31	March 4, 1917; Previous service, 1913–1915.	10th term*	Left the House in 1935.
36	Harold Knutson	R	MN	March 4, 1917	9th term	
37	Clarence F. Lea	D	CA-01	March 4, 1917	9th term	
38	Joseph J. Mansfield	D	TX-09	March 4, 1917	9th term	
39	Nathan Leroy Strong	R	PA-27	March 4, 1917	9th term	Left the House in 1935.
40	Christopher D. Sullivan	D	NY-13	March 4, 1917	9th term	
41	Anthony J. Griffin	D	NY-22	March 5, 1918	9th term	
42	S. Otis Bland	D	VA	July 2, 1918	9th term	
43	Clay Stone Briggs	D	TX-07	March 4, 1919	8th term	Died on April 29, 1933.
44	Frank Crowther	R	NY-30	March 4, 1919	8th term	
45	Thomas H. Cullen	D	NY-04	March 4, 1919	8th term	
46	Robert Luce	R	MA-09	March 4, 1919	8th term	Left the House in 1935.
47	James M. Mead	D	NY-42	March 4, 1919	8th term	
48	John McDuffie	D	AL-01	March 4, 1919	8th term	
49	Daniel A. Reed	R	NY-43	March 4, 1919	8th term	
50	James H. Sinclair	R	ND	March 4, 1919	8th term	Left the House in 1935.
51	J. Will Taylor	R	TN-02	March 4, 1919	8th term	
52	Fritz G. Lanham	D	TX-12	April 19, 1919	8th term	
53	Patrick H. Drewry	D	VA	April 27, 1920	8th term	
54	Hamilton Fish Jr.	R	NY-26	November 2, 1920	8th term	
55	Harry C. Ransley	R	PA-01	November 2, 1920	8th term	
56	Carroll L. Beedy	R	ME-01	March 4, 1921	7th term	Left the House in 1935.
57	Ross A. Collins	D	MS-05	March 4, 1921	7th term	Left the House in 1935.
58	James J. Connolly	R	PA-05	March 4, 1921	7th term	Left the House in 1935.
59	William J. Driver	D	AR-01	March 4, 1921	7th term	
60	Hampton P. Fulmer	D	SC-02	March 4, 1921	7th term	
61	Thomas Alan Goldsborough	D	MD-01	March 4, 1921	7th term	
62	John J. McSwain	D	SC-04	March 4, 1921	7th term	
63	Tilman B. Parks	D	AR-07	March 4, 1921	7th term	
64	Randolph Perkins	R	NJ-07	March 4, 1921	7th term	
65	John E. Rankin	D	MS-01	March 4, 1921	7th term	
66	Morgan G. Sanders	D	TX-03	March 4, 1921	7th term	
67	John N. Sandlin	D	LA-04	March 4, 1921	7th term	
68	Roy O. Woodruff	R	MI-10	March 4, 1921; Previous service, 1913–1915.	8th term*	
69	Lamar Jeffers	D	AL-04	June 7, 1921	7th term	Left the House in 1935.
70	A. Piatt Andrew	R	MA-06	September 27, 1921	7th term	
71	Charles Laban Abernethy	D	NC-03	November 7, 1922	7th term	Left the House in 1935.
72	Charles L. Gifford	R	MA-15	November 7, 1922	7th term	
73	Miles C. Allgood	D	AL-05	March 4, 1923	6th term	Left the House in 1935.
74	William W. Arnold	D	IL-23	March 4, 1923	6th term	
75	William Augustus Ayres	D	KS-05	March 4, 1923; Previous service, 1915–1921.	9th term*	Resigned on August 22, 1934.
76	Robert L. Bacon	R	NY-01	March 4, 1923	6th term	
77	Loring Milton Black Jr.	D	NY-05	March 4, 1923	6th term	Left the House in 1935.
78	Sol Bloom	D	NY-19	March 4, 1923	6th term	
79	John J. Boylan	D	NY-15	March 4, 1923	6th term	
80	Gordon Browning	D	TN-07	March 4, 1923	6th term	Left the House in 1935.
81	T. Jeff Busby	D	MS-04	March 4, 1923	6th term	Left the House in 1935.
82	Clarence Cannon	D	MO	March 4, 1923	6th term	
83	Emanuel Celler	D	NY-10	March 4, 1923	6th term	
84	William P. Connery Jr.	D	MA-07	March 4, 1923	6th term	
85	Parker Corning	D	NY-28	March 4, 1923	6th term	
86	Robert Crosser	D	OH-21	March 4, 1923; Previous service, 1913–1919.	9th term*	
87	Samuel Dickstein	D	NY-12	March 4, 1923	6th term	
88	Allard H. Gasque	D	SC-06	March 4, 1923	6th term	
89	Arthur H. Greenwood	D	IN-07	March 4, 1923	6th term	
90	William Wirt Hastings	D	OK-02	March 4, 1923; Previous service, 1915–1921.	9th term*	Left the House in 1935.
91	Edgar Howard	D	NE-03	March 4, 1923	6th term	Left the House in 1935.
92	Luther Alexander Johnson	D	TX-06	March 4, 1923	6th term	
93	Jacob Banks Kurtz	R	PA-23	March 4, 1923	6th term	Left the House in 1935.
94	George W. Lindsay	D	NY-03	March 4, 1923	6th term	Left the House in 1935.
95	Ralph F. Lozier	D	MO	March 4, 1923	6th term	Left the House in 1935.
96	Tom D. McKeown	D	OK-04	March 4, 1923; Previous service, 1917–1921.	8th term*	Left the House in 1935.
97	Clarence J. McLeod	R	MI-13	March 4, 1923; Previous service, 1920–1921.	7th term*	
98	Samuel Davis McReynolds	D	TN-03	March 4, 1923	6th term	
99	Jacob L. Milligan	D	MO	March 4, 1923; Previous service, 1920–1921.	7th term*	Left the House in 1935.
100	John H. Morehead	D	NE-01	March 4, 1923	6th term	Left the House in 1935.
101	Frank A. Oliver	D	NY-23	March 4, 1923	6th term	Resigned on June 18, 1934.
102	Hubert H. Peavey	R	WI-10	March 4, 1923	6th term	Left the House in 1935.
103	Henry Thomas Rainey	D	IL-20	March 4, 1923; Previous service, 1903–1921.	15th term*	Speaker of the House; Died on August 19, 1934.
104	Heartsill Ragon	D	AR-05	March 4, 1923	6th term	Resigned on June 16, 1933.
105	Frank R. Reid	R	IL-11	March 4, 1923	6th term	Left the House in 1935.
106	Milton A. Romjue	D	MO	March 4, 1923; Previous service, 1917–1921.	8th term*	
107	George N. Seger	R	NJ-08	March 4, 1923	6th term	
108	Gale H. Stalker	R	NY-37	March 4, 1923	6th term	Left the House in 1935.
109	John Taber	R	NY-36	March 4, 1923	6th term	
110	Mell G. Underwood	D	OH-11	March 4, 1923	6th term	
111	Clifton A. Woodrum	D	VA	March 4, 1923	6th term	
112	J. Lister Hill	D	AL-02	August 14, 1923	6th term	
113	Samuel B. Hill	D	WA-05	September 25, 1923	6th term	
114	Ernest Willard Gibson	R	VT	November 6, 1923	6th term	Resigned on October 19, 1933.
115	John H. Kerr	D	NC-02	November 6, 1923	6th term	
116	John J. O'Connor	D	NY-16	November 6, 1923	6th term	
117	Anning Smith Prall	D	NY-11	November 6, 1923	6th term	Left the House in 1935.
118	Stephen Warfield Gambrill	D	MD-05	November 4, 1924	6th term	
119	Oscar L. Auf der Heide	D	NJ-14	March 4, 1925	5th term	Left the House in 1935.
120	Albert E. Carter	R	CA-06	March 4, 1925	5th term	
121	Edward E. Cox	D	GA-02	March 4, 1925	5th term	
122	John J. Douglass	D	MA-11	March 4, 1925	5th term	Left the House in 1935.
123	Charles Aubrey Eaton	R	NJ-05	March 4, 1925	5th term	
124	Frank H. Foss	R	MA-03	March 4, 1925	5th term	Left the House in 1935.
125	Robert A. Green	D	FL-02	March 4, 1925	5th term	
126	Thomas A. Jenkins	R	OH-10	March 4, 1925	5th term	
127	Florence Prag Kahn	R	CA-04	March 4, 1925	5th term	
128	Bolivar E. Kemp	D	LA-06	March 4, 1925	5th term	Died on June 19, 1933.
129	Joseph William Martin Jr.	R	MA-14	March 4, 1925	5th term	
130	Thomas S. McMillan	D	SC-01	March 4, 1925	5th term	
131	Mary Teresa Norton	D	NJ-13	March 4, 1925	5th term	
132	Andrew Lawrence Somers	D	NY-06	March 4, 1925	5th term	
133	Lloyd Thurston	R	IA-05	March 4, 1925	5th term	
134	Lindsay Carter Warren	D	NC-01	March 4, 1925	5th term	
135	William Madison Whittington	D	MS-03	March 4, 1925	5th term	
136	Edith Nourse Rogers	R	MA-05	June 30, 1925	5th term	
137	Joseph L. Hooper	R	MI-03	August 18, 1925	5th term	Died on February 22, 1934.
138	Harry Lane Englebright	R	CA-02	August 31, 1926	5th term	
139	Richard J. Welch	R	CA-05	August 31, 1926	5th term	
140	John J. Cochran	D	MO	November 2, 1926	5th term	
141	John T. Buckbee	R	IL-12	March 4, 1927	4th term	
142	Wilburn Cartwright	D	OK-03	March 4, 1927	4th term	
143	Patrick J. Carley	D	NY-08	March 4, 1927	4th term	Left the House in 1935.
144	John D. Clarke	R	NY-34	March 4, 1927; Previous service, 1921–1925.	6th term*	Died on November 5, 1933.
145	Thomas Cunningham Cochran	R	PA-20	March 4, 1927	4th term	Left the House in 1935.
146	Isaac Hoffer Doutrich	R	PA-19	March 4, 1927	4th term	
147	William E. Evans	R	CA-11	March 4, 1927	4th term	Left the House in 1935.
148	James M. Fitzpatrick	D	NY-24	March 4, 1927	4th term	
149	William Voris Gregory	D	KY	March 4, 1927	4th term	
150	Ulysses Samuel Guyer	R	KS-02	March 4, 1927; Previous service, 1924–1925.	5th term*	
151	Clifford R. Hope	R	KS-07	March 4, 1927	4th term	
152	Jed Johnson	D	OK-06	March 4, 1927	4th term	
153	Vincent Luke Palmisano	D	MD-03	March 4, 1927	4th term	
154	William I. Sirovich	D	NY-14	March 4, 1927	4th term	
155	J. Howard Swick	R	PA-26	March 4, 1927	4th term	Left the House in 1935.
156	Malcolm C. Tarver	D	GA-07	March 4, 1927	4th term	
157	Charles A. Wolverton	R	NJ-01	March 4, 1927	4th term	
158	René L. De Rouen	D	LA-07	August 23, 1927	4th term	
159	James M. Beck	R	PA-02	November 8, 1927	4th term	Resigned on September 30, 1934.
160	Clarence E. Hancock	R	NY-35	November 8, 1927	4th term	
161	Francis D. Culkin	R	NY-32	November 6, 1928	4th term	
162	John William McCormack	D	MA-12	November 6, 1928	4th term	
163	Richard B. Wigglesworth	R	MA-13	November 6, 1928	4th term	
164	James Wolfenden	R	PA-08	November 6, 1928	4th term	
165	Chester C. Bolton	R	OH-22	March 4, 1929	3rd term	
166	George F. Brumm	R	PA-13	March 4, 1929; Previous service, 1923–1927.	5th term*	Died on May 29, 1934.
167	William F. Brunner	D	NY-02	March 4, 1929	3rd term	
168	Vincent Carter	R	WY	March 4, 1929	3rd term	Left the House in 1935.
169	J. Bayard Clark	D	NC-07	March 4, 1929	3rd term	
170	Jere Cooper	D	TN-08	March 4, 1929	3rd term	
171	Oliver H. Cross	D	TX-11	March 4, 1929	3rd term	
172	Wall Doxey	D	MS-02	March 4, 1929	3rd term	
173	Claude A. Fuller	D	AR-03	March 4, 1929	3rd term	
174	David Delano Glover	D	AR-06	March 4, 1929	3rd term	Left the House in 1935.
175	William E. Hess	R	OH-02	March 4, 1929	3rd term	
176	Oscar Stanton De Priest	R	IL-01	March 4, 1929	3rd term	Left the House in 1935.
177	Fred A. Hartley	R	NJ-10	March 4, 1929	3rd term	
178	William P. Lambertson	R	KS-01	March 4, 1929	3rd term	
179	Louis Ludlow	D	IN-12	March 4, 1929	3rd term	
180	Wright Patman	D	TX-01	March 4, 1929	3rd term	
181	Joe L. Smith	D	WV-06	March 4, 1929	3rd term	
182	James L. Whitley	R	NY-38	March 4, 1929	3rd term	Left the House in 1935.
183	Charles Murray Turpin	R	PA-12	June 4, 1929	3rd term	
184	Numa F. Montet	D	LA-03	August 6, 1929	3rd term	
185	Robert Ramspeck	D	GA-05	October 2, 1929	3rd term	
186	Paul John Kvale	R	MN	October 16, 1929	3rd term	
187	Joseph A. Gavagan	D	NY-21	November 5, 1929	3rd term	
188	J. Roland Kinzer	R	PA-10	January 28, 1930	3rd term	
189	William J. Granfield	D	MA-02	February 11, 1930	3rd term	
190	Martin J. Kennedy	D	NY-18	April 11, 1930	3rd term	
191	Thomas L. Blanton	D	TX-17	May 20, 1930; Previous service, 1917–1929.	9th term*	
192	Francis B. Condon	D	RI-01	November 4, 1930	3rd term	
193	Edward W. Goss	R	CT-05	November 4, 1930	3rd term	Left the House in 1935.
194	Franklin Wills Hancock Jr.	D	NC-05	November 4, 1930	3rd term	
195	Claude V. Parsons	D	IL-24	November 4, 1930	3rd term	
196	Michael Reilly	D	WI-06	November 4, 1930; Previous service, 1913–1917.	5th term*	
197	Robert F. Rich	R	PA-16	November 4, 1930	3rd term	
198	Stephen A. Rudd	D	NY-09	February 17, 1931	3rd term	
199	Walter G. Andrews	R	NY-40	March 4, 1931	2nd term	
200	Harry P. Beam	D	IL-04	March 4, 1931	2nd term	
201	John W. Boehne Jr.	D	IN-08	March 4, 1931	2nd term	
202	Gerald J. Boileau	R	WI-07	March 4, 1931	2nd term	
203	Patrick J. Boland	D	PA-11	March 4, 1931	2nd term	
204	Alfred L. Bulwinkle	D	NC-10	March 4, 1931; Previous service, 1921–1929.	6th term*	
205	Thomas G. Burch	D	VA	March 4, 1931	2nd term	
206	Cap R. Carden	D	KY	March 4, 1931	2nd term	
207	Glover H. Cary	D	KY	March 4, 1931	2nd term	
208	Peter Angelo Cavicchia	R	NJ-11	March 4, 1931	2nd term	
209	Virgil Chapman	D	KY	March 4, 1931; Previous service, 1925–1929.	4th term*	
210	Dennis Chavez	D	NM	March 4, 1931	2nd term	Left the House in 1935.
211	William Purington Cole Jr.	D	MD-02	March 4, 1931; Previous service, 1927–1929.	3rd term*	
212	Eugene B. Crowe	D	IN-09	March 4, 1931	2nd term	
213	E. H. Crump	D	TN-09	March 4, 1931	2nd term	Left the House in 1935.
214	Clement C. Dickinson	D	MO	March 4, 1931; Previous service, 1910–1921 and 1923–1929.	11th term**	Left the House in 1935.
215	Martin Dies Jr.	D	TX-02	March 4, 1931	2nd term	
216	Wesley Ernest Disney	D	OK-01	March 4, 1931	2nd term	
217	Joachim O. Fernández	D	LA-01	March 4, 1931	2nd term	
218	William L. Fiesinger	D	OH-13	March 4, 1931	2nd term	
219	John W. Flannagan Jr.	D	VA	March 4, 1931	2nd term	
220	Fred C. Gilchrist	R	IA-08	March 4, 1931	2nd term	
221	Glenn Griswold	D	IN-05	March 4, 1931	2nd term	
222	Harry L. Haines	D	PA-22	March 4, 1931	2nd term	
223	Byron B. Harlan	D	OH-03	March 4, 1931	2nd term	
224	Pehr G. Holmes	R	MA-04	March 4, 1931	2nd term	
225	Lynn Hornor	D	WV-03	March 4, 1931	2nd term	Died on September 23, 1933.
226	Bernhard M. Jacobsen	D	IA-02	March 4, 1931	2nd term	
227	Kent E. Keller	D	IL-25	March 4, 1931	2nd term	
228	Edward A. Kelly	D	IL-03	March 4, 1931	2nd term	
229	Frank C. Kniffin	D	OH-05	March 4, 1931	2nd term	
230	Walter Lambeth	D	NC-08	March 4, 1931	2nd term	
231	Arthur P. Lamneck	D	OH-12	March 4, 1931	2nd term	
232	William Larrabee	D	IN-11	March 4, 1931	2nd term	
233	David John Lewis	D	MD-06	March 4, 1931; Previous service, 1911–1917.	5th term*	
234	James Earl Major	D	IL-21	March 4, 1931; Previous service, 1923–1925 and 1927–1929.	4th term**	Resigned on October 6, 1933.
235	Paul H. Maloney	D	LA-02	March 4, 1931	2nd term	
236	Leroy T. Marshall	R	OH-07	March 4, 1931	2nd term	
237	Charles Martin	D	OR-03	March 4, 1931	2nd term	Left the House in 1935.
238	Andrew J. May	D	KY	March 4, 1931	2nd term	
239	Harold C. McGugin	R	KS-03	March 4, 1931	2nd term	Left the House in 1935.
240	Charles D. Millard	R	NY-25	March 4, 1931	2nd term	
241	John E. Miller	D	AR-02	March 4, 1931	2nd term	
242	John Ridley Mitchell	D	TN-04	March 4, 1931	2nd term	
243	Samuel B. Pettengill	D	IN-03	March 4, 1931	2nd term	
244	James G. Polk	D	OH-06	March 4, 1931	2nd term	
245	Leonard W. Schuetz	D	IL-07	March 4, 1931	2nd term	
246	Ashton C. Shallenberger	D	NE-04	March 4, 1931; Previous service, 1901–1903, 1915–1919 and 1923–1929.	8th term***	Left the House in 1935.
247	Joe Shannon	D	MO	March 4, 1931	2nd term	
248	Howard W. Smith	D	VA	March 4, 1931	2nd term	
249	Brent Spence	D	KY	March 4, 1931	2nd term	
250	William H. Sutphin	D	NJ-03	March 4, 1931	2nd term	
251	Fletcher B. Swank	D	OK-05	March 4, 1931; Previous service, 1921–1929.	6th term*	Left the House in 1935.
252	R. Ewing Thomason	D	TX-16	March 4, 1931	2nd term	
253	Fred M. Vinson	D	KY	March 4, 1931; Previous service, 1924–1929.	5th term*	
254	Zebulon Weaver	D	NC-11	March 4, 1931; Previous service, 1917–1919 and 1919–1929.	8th term**	
255	Charles F. West	D	OH-17	March 4, 1931	2nd term	Left the House in 1935.
256	Clyde Williams	D	MO	March 4, 1931; Previous service, 1927–1929.	3rd term*	
257	Gardner R. Withrow	R	WI-03	March 4, 1931	2nd term	
258	Jesse P. Wolcott	R	MI-07	March 4, 1931	2nd term	
259	John Stephens Wood	D	GA-09	March 4, 1931	2nd term	Left the House in 1935.
260	Homer C. Parker	D	GA-01	September 9, 1931	2nd term	Left the House in 1935.
261	John J. Delaney	D	NY-07	November 3, 1931; Previous service, 1918–1919.	3rd term*	
262	Michael J. Hart	D	MI-08	November 3, 1931	2nd term	Left the House in 1935.
263	John B. Hollister	R	OH-01	November 3, 1931	2nd term	
264	Edward L. Stokes	R	PA-06	November 3, 1931	2nd term	Left the House in 1935.
265	Martin L. Sweeney	D	OH-20	November 3, 1931	2nd term	
266	Richard M. Kleberg	D	TX-14	November 24, 1931	2nd term	
267	William Nathaniel Rogers	D	NH-01	January 5, 1932; Previous service, 1923–1925.	3rd term*	
268	Lawrence R. Ellzey	D	MS-07	March 15, 1932	2nd term	Left the House in 1935.
269	Bryant Thomas Castellow	D	GA-03	November 8, 1932	2nd term	
270	Ambrose Jerome Kennedy	D	MD-04	November 8, 1932	2nd term	
271	Joe H. Eagle	D	TX-08	January 28, 1933; Previous service, 1913–1921.	6th term*	
272	J. Leroy Adair	D	IL-15	March 4, 1933	1st term	
273	Wilbur L. Adams	D	DE	March 4, 1933	1st term	Left the House in 1935.
274	Leo E. Allen	R	IL-13	March 4, 1933	1st term	
275	Henry M. Arens	R	MN	March 4, 1933	1st term	Left the House in 1935.
276	Roy E. Ayers	D	MT-02	March 4, 1933	1st term	
277	Joseph Weldon Bailey Jr.	D	TX	March 4, 1933	1st term	Left the House in 1935.
278	Charles Montague Bakewell	R	CT	March 4, 1933	1st term	Left the House in 1935.
279	Alfred F. Beiter	D	NY-41	March 4, 1933	1st term	
280	William M. Berlin	D	PA-28	March 4, 1933	1st term	
281	Fred Biermann	D	IA-04	March 4, 1933	1st term	
282	George Washington Blanchard	R	WI-01	March 4, 1933	1st term	Left the House in 1935.
283	Martin A. Brennan	D	IL	March 4, 1933	1st term	
284	J. Twing Brooks	D	PA-30	March 4, 1933	1st term	
285	John Y. Brown Sr.	D	KY	March 4, 1933	1st term	Left the House in 1935.
286	Prentiss M. Brown	D	MI-11	March 4, 1933	1st term	
287	Frank H. Buck	D	CA-03	March 4, 1933	1st term	
288	Edward R. Burke	D	NE-02	March 4, 1933	1st term	Left the House in 1935.
289	John H. Burke	D	CA-18	March 4, 1933	1st term	Left the House in 1935.
290	George Burnham	R	CA-20	March 4, 1933	1st term	
291	Claude E. Cady	D	MI-06	March 4, 1933	1st term	Left the House in 1935.
292	Millard F. Caldwell	D	FL-03	March 4, 1933	1st term	
293	Raymond Joseph Cannon	D	WI-04	March 4, 1933	1st term	
294	Randolph Carpenter	D	KS-04	March 4, 1933	1st term	
295	Terry Carpenter	D	NE-05	March 4, 1933	1st term	Left the House in 1935.
296	Theodore Christianson	D	MN	March 4, 1933	1st term	
297	Denver S. Church	D	CA-09	March 4, 1933; Previous service, 1913–1919.	4th term*	Left the House in 1935.
298	Ray P. Chase	R	MN	March 4, 1933	1st term	Left the House in 1935.
299	James Robert Claiborne	D	MO	March 4, 1933	1st term	
300	Thomas C. Coffin	D	ID-02	March 4, 1933	1st term	Died on June 8, 1934.
301	Charles J. Colden	D	CA-17	March 4, 1933	1st term	
302	William M. Colmer	D	MS-06	March 4, 1933	1st term	
303	Sam L. Collins	R	CA-19	March 4, 1933	1st term	
304	William B. Cravens	D	AR-04	March 4, 1933; Previous service, 1907–1913.	4th term*	
305	Charles N. Crosby	D	PA-29	March 4, 1933	1st term	
306	Fred N. Cummings	D	CO-02	March 4, 1933	1st term	
307	Colgate Darden	D	VA	March 4, 1933	1st term	
308	Cleveland Dear	D	LA-08	March 4, 1933	1st term	
309	Braswell Deen	D	GA-08	March 4, 1933	1st term	
310	John D. Dingell Sr.	D	MI-15	March 4, 1933	1st term	
311	Everett Dirksen	R	IL-16	March 4, 1933	1st term	
312	J. William Ditter	R	PA-17	March 4, 1933	1st term	
313	Donald C. Dobbins	D	IL-19	March 4, 1933	1st term	
314	John F. Dockweiler	D	CA-16	March 4, 1933	1st term	
315	George Anthony Dondero	R	MI-17	March 4, 1933	1st term	
316	Warren J. Duffey	D	OH-09	March 4, 1933	1st term	
317	Richard M. Duncan	D	MO	March 4, 1933	1st term	
318	Matthew A. Dunn	D	PA-34	March 4, 1933	1st term	
319	George R. Durgan	D	IN-02	March 4, 1933	1st term	Left the House in 1935.
320	George W. Edmonds	R	PA-04	March 4, 1933; Previous service, 1913–1925.	7th term*	Left the House in 1935.
321	Edward C. Eicher	D	IA-01	March 4, 1933	1st term	
322	Henry Ellenbogen	D	PA-33	March 4, 1933	1st term	
323	Ralph R. Eltse	R	CA-07	March 4, 1933	1st term	Left the House in 1935.
324	Charles I. Faddis	D	PA-25	March 4, 1933	1st term	
325	James I. Farley	D	IN-04	March 4, 1933	1st term	
326	John Fitzgibbons	D	NY	March 4, 1933	1st term	Left the House in 1935.
327	Thomas B. Fletcher	D	OH-08	March 4, 1933; Previous service, 1925–1929.	3rd term*	
328	Benjamin K. Focht	R	PA-18	March 4, 1933; Previous service, 1907–1913 and 1915–1923.	8th term**	
329	Thomas F. Ford	D	CA-14	March 4, 1933	1st term	
330	George Ernest Foulkes	D	MI-04	March 4, 1933	1st term	Left the House in 1935.
331	Frank Gillespie	D	IL-17	March 4, 1933	1st term	Left the House in 1935.
332	Guy M. Gillette	D	IA-09	March 4, 1933	1st term	
333	Finly Hutchinson Gray	D	IN-10	March 4, 1933; Previous service, 1911–1917.	4th term*	
334	Philip A. Goodwin	R	NY-27	March 4, 1933	1st term	
335	Finley Hamilton	D	KY	March 4, 1933	1st term	Left the House in 1935.
336	Dow W. Harter	D	OH-14	March 4, 1933	1st term	
337	Arthur Daniel Healey	D	MA-08	March 4, 1933	1st term	
338	Charles W. Henney	D	WI-02	March 4, 1933	1st term	Left the House in 1935.
339	William L. Higgins	R	CT-02	March 4, 1933	1st term	
340	Fred H. Hildebrandt	D	SD-01	March 4, 1933	1st term	
341	Knute Hill	D	WA-04	March 4, 1933	1st term	
342	John H. Hoeppel	D	CA-12	March 4, 1933	1st term	
343	Einar Hoidale	D	MN	March 4, 1933	1st term	Left the House in 1935.
344	James F. Hughes	D	WI-08	March 4, 1933	1st term	Left the House in 1935.
345	Lawrence E. Imhoff	D	OH-18	March 4, 1933	1st term	
346	Virginia E. Jenckes	D	IN-06	March 4, 1933	1st term	
347	George W. Johnson	D	WV-04	March 4, 1933; Previous service, 1923–1925.	2nd term*	
348	Magnus Johnson	FL	MN	March 4, 1933	1st term	Left the House in 1935.
349	John Kee	D	WV-05	March 4, 1933	1st term	
350	Leo Kocialkowski	D	IL-08	March 4, 1933	1st term	
351	Edward Aloysius Kenney	D	NJ-09	March 4, 1933	1st term	
352	Frank Le Blond Kloeb	D	OH-04	March 4, 1933	1st term	
353	Herman P. Kopplemann	D	CT-01	March 4, 1933	1st term	
354	Charles Kramer	D	CA-13	March 4, 1933	1st term	
355	James J. Lanzetta	D	NY-20	March 4, 1933	1st term	Left the House in 1935.
356	Frank H. Lee	D	MO	March 4, 1933	1st term	Left the House in 1935.
357	John C. Lehr	D	MI-02	March 4, 1933	1st term	Left the House in 1935.
358	William Lemke	R	ND	March 4, 1933	1st term	
359	John Lesinski Sr.	D	MI-16	March 4, 1933	1st term	
360	Lawrence Lewis	D	CO-01	March 4, 1933	1st term	
361	Wesley Lloyd	D	WA-06	March 4, 1933	1st term	
362	Ernest Lundeen	R	MN	March 4, 1933; Previous service, 1917–1919.	2nd term*	
363	Francis T. Maloney	D	CT-03	March 4, 1933	1st term	Left the House in 1935.
364	E. W. Marland	D	OK-08	March 4, 1933	1st term	Left the House in 1935.
365	John Andrew Martin	D	CO-03	March 4, 1933; Previous service, 1909–1913.	3rd term*	
366	Kathryn O'Loughlin McCarthy	D	KS-06	March 4, 1933	1st term	Left the House in 1935.
367	William D. McFarlane	D	TX-13	March 4, 1933	1st term	
368	John J. McGrath	D	CA-08	March 4, 1933	1st term	
369	Donald H. McLean	R	NJ-06	March 4, 1933	1st term	
370	James A. Meeks	D	IL-18	March 4, 1933	1st term	
371	Schuyler Merritt	R	CT-04	March 4, 1933; Previous service, 1917–1931.	8th term*	
372	Joseph P. Monaghan	D	MT-01	March 4, 1933	1st term	
373	Edward C. Moran Jr.	D	ME-02	March 4, 1933	1st term	
374	James W. Mott	R	OR-01	March 4, 1933	1st term	
375	P. H. Moynihan	R	IL-02	March 4, 1933	1st term	Left the House in 1935.
376	Michael Joseph Muldowney	R	PA-32	March 4, 1933	1st term	Left the House in 1935.
377	Harry W. Musselwhite	D	MI-09	March 4, 1933	1st term	Left the House in 1935.
378	Orrice Abram Murdock Jr.	D	UT-01	March 4, 1933	1st term	
379	Walter Nesbit	D	IL	March 4, 1933	1st term	Left the House in 1935.
380	Emmett Marshall Owen	D	GA-04	March 4, 1933	1st term	
381	Thomas J. O'Brien	D	IL-06	March 4, 1933	1st term	
382	John Matthew O'Connell	D	RI-02	March 4, 1933	1st term	
383	Thomas O'Malley	D	WI-05	March 4, 1933	1st term	
384	J. Hardin Peterson	D	FL-01	March 4, 1933	1st term	
385	Theodore A. Peyser	D	NY-17	March 4, 1933	1st term	
386	Walter M. Pierce	D	OR-02	March 4, 1933	1st term	
387	D. Lane Powers	R	NJ-04	March 4, 1933	1st term	
388	Robert L. Ramsay	D	WV-01	March 4, 1933	1st term	
389	Jennings Randolph	D	WV-02	March 4, 1933	1st term	
390	B. Carroll Reece	R	TN-01	March 4, 1933; Previous service, 1921–1931.	6th term*	
391	Absalom Willis Robertson	D	VA	March 4, 1933	1st term	
392	J. W. Robinson	D	UT-02	March 4, 1933	1st term	
393	James P. Richards	D	SC-05	March 4, 1933	1st term	
394	William Emanuel Richardson	D	PA-14	March 4, 1933	1st term	
395	Will Rogers	D	OK	March 4, 1933	1st term	
396	James Edward Ruffin	D	MO	March 4, 1933	1st term	Left the House in 1935.
397	George G. Sadowski	D	MI-01	March 4, 1933	1st term	
398	Edwin M. Schaefer	D	IL-22	March 4, 1933	1st term	
399	William T. Schulte	D	IN-01	March 4, 1933	1st term	
400	James G. Scrugham	D	NV	March 4, 1933	1st term	
401	William J. Sears	D	FL	March 4, 1933; Previous service, 1915–1929.	8th term*	
402	Robert T. Secrest	D	OH-15	March 4, 1933	1st term	
403	Francis Shoemaker	FL	MN	March 4, 1933	1st term	Left the House in 1935.
404	James Simpson Jr.	R	IL-10	March 4, 1933	1st term	Left the House in 1935.
405	Fred Sisson	D	NY-33	March 4, 1933	1st term	
406	Martin F. Smith	D	WA-03	March 4, 1933	1st term	
407	J. Buell Snyder	D	PA-24	March 4, 1933	1st term	
408	Sterling P. Strong	D	TX	March 4, 1933	1st term	Left the House in 1935.
409	Henry E. Stubbs	D	CA-10	March 4, 1933	1st term	
410	Elmer E. Studley	D	NY	March 4, 1933	1st term	Left the House in 1935.
411	John C. Taylor	D	SC-03	March 4, 1933	1st term	
412	George B. Terrell	D	TX	March 4, 1933	1st term	Left the House in 1935.
413	Chester C. Thompson	D	IL-14	March 4, 1933	1st term	
414	William R. Thom	D	OH-16	March 4, 1933	1st term	
415	Charles W. Tobey	R	NH-02	March 4, 1933	1st term	
416	William I. Traeger	R	CA-15	March 4, 1933	1st term	Left the House in 1935.
417	Charles V. Truax	D	OH	March 4, 1933	1st term	
418	Clarence W. Turner	D	TN-06	March 4, 1933; Previous service, 1922–1923.	2nd term*	
419	William B. Umstead	D	NC-06	March 4, 1933	1st term	
420	John G. Utterback	D	ME-03	March 4, 1933	1st term	Left the House in 1935.
421	James Wolcott Wadsworth Jr.	R	NY-39	March 4, 1933	1st term	
422	Alfred M. Waldron	R	PA-03	March 4, 1933	1st term	Left the House in 1935.
423	Monrad Wallgren	D	WA-02	March 4, 1933	1st term	
424	Francis E. Walter	D	PA-21	March 4, 1933	1st term	
425	Otha Wearin	D	IA-07	March 4, 1933	1st term	
426	Carl M. Weideman	D	MI-14	March 4, 1933	1st term	Left the House in 1935.
427	Theodore B. Werner	D	SD-02	March 4, 1933	1st term	
428	Compton I. White	D	ID-01	March 4, 1933	1st term	
429	J. Mark Wilcox	D	FL-04	March 4, 1933	1st term	
430	Albert C. Willford	D	IA-03	March 4, 1933	1st term	Left the House in 1935.
431	Reuben T. Wood	D	MO	March 4, 1933	1st term	
432	Stephen M. Young	D	OH	March 4, 1933	1st term	
433	Marion Zioncheck	D	WA-01	March 4, 1933	1st term	
	Milton H. West	D	TX-15	April 23, 1933	1st term	
	Clark W. Thompson	D	TX-07	June 24, 1933	1st term	Left the House in 1935.
	Paul Brown	D	GA-10	July 5, 1933	1st term	
	Isabella Greenway	D	AZ	October 3, 1933	1st term	
	Oliver W. Frey	D	PA-09	November 7, 1933	1st term	
	Archibald Hill Carmichael	D	AL-08	November 14, 1933	1st term	
	Andrew Edmiston Jr.	D	WV-03	November 28, 1933	1st term	
	David D. Terry	D	AR-05	December 19, 1933	1st term	
	Marian W. Clarke	R	NY-34	December 28, 1933	1st term	Left the House in 1935.
	Charles Albert Plumley	R	VT	January 16, 1934	1st term	
	William D. Thomas	R	NY-29	January 30, 1934	1st term	
	Jared Y. Sanders Jr.	D	LA-06	May 1, 1934	1st term	
	Harold D. Cooley	D	NC-04	July 7, 1934	1st term	

== Delegates ==
Rank	Delegate	Party	District	Seniority date (Previous service, if any)	No.# of term(s)	Notes
1	Pedro Guevara	Nac	PHL	March 4, 1923	6th term	
2	Camilo Osías	Nac	PHL	March 4, 1929	3rd term	
3	Anthony Dimond	D	AK	March 4, 1933	1st term	
4	Santiago Iglesias	Coalitionist	PR	March 4, 1933	1st term	
5	Lincoln L. McCandless	D	HI	March 4, 1933	1st term	

== See also ==
- 73rd United States Congress
- List of United States congressional districts
- List of United States senators in the 73rd Congress
