= List of United States senators in the 73rd Congress =

This is a complete list of United States senators during the 73rd United States Congress listed by seniority from March 4, 1933, to January 3, 1935.

Order of service is based on the commencement of the senator's first term. Behind this is former service as a senator (only giving the senator seniority within their new incoming class), service as vice president, a House member, a cabinet secretary, or a governor of a state. The final factor is the population of the senator's state.

Senators who were sworn in during the middle of the Congress (up until the last senator who was not sworn in early after winning the November 1934 election) are listed at the end of the list with no number.

== Terms of service ==
Class	Terms of service of senators that expired in years
Class 1	Terms of service of senators that expired in 1935 (AZ, CA, CT, DE, FL, IN, MA, MD, ME, MI, MN, MO, MS, MT, ND, NE, NJ, NM, NV, NY, OH, PA, RI, TN, TX, UT, VA, VT, WA, WI, WV, and WY.)
Class 2	Terms of service of senators that expired in 1937 (AL, AR, CO, DE, GA, IA, ID, IL, KS, KY, LA, MA, ME, MI, MN, MS, MT, NC, NE, NH, NJ, NM, OK, OR, RI, SC, SD, TN, TX, VA, WV, and WY.)
Class 3	Terms of service of senators that expired in 1939 (AL, AR, AZ, CA, CO, CT, FL, GA, ID, IL, IN, IA, KS, KY, LA, MD, MO, NC, ND, NH, NV, NY, OH, OK, OR, PA, SC, SD, UT, VT, WA, and WI.)

== U.S. Senate seniority list ==
U.S. Senate seniority
Rank	Senator (party-state)	Seniority date	Other factors
1	William Borah (R-ID)	March 4, 1907	
2	Ellison D. Smith (D-SC)	March 4, 1909	South Carolina 24th in population (1900)
3	Duncan U. Fletcher (D-FL)	March 4, 1909	Florida 33rd in population (1900)
4	Henry F. Ashurst (D-AZ)	April 2, 1912	
5	Key Pittman (D-NV)	January 29, 1913	
6	Morris Sheppard (D-TX)	February 3, 1913	
7	Joseph Robinson (D-AR)	March 4, 1913	Former representative (10 years), former governor
8	George W. Norris (R-NE)	March 4, 1913	Former representative (10 years)
9	Kenneth McKellar (D-TN)	March 4, 1917	Former representative (6 years)
10	William H. King (D-UT)	March 4, 1917	Former representative (3 years)
11	Park Trammell (D-FL)	March 4, 1917	Former governor, Florida 33rd in population (1910)
12	John B. Kendrick (D-WY)	March 4, 1917	Former governor, Wyoming 47th in population (1910)
13	Frederick Hale (R-ME)	March 4, 1917	
14	Hiram Johnson (R-CA)	March 16, 1917	
15	Charles L. McNary (R-OR)	December 18, 1918	
16	Arthur Capper (R-KS)	March 4, 1919	Former governor, Kansas 22nd in population (1910)
17	Henry W. Keyes (R-NH)	March 4, 1919	Former governor, New Hampshire 39th in population (1910)
18	Pat Harrison (D-MS)	March 5, 1919	
19	Carter Glass (D-VA)	February 2, 1920	
20	Peter Norbeck (R-SD)	March 4, 1921	
21	David A. Reed (R-PA)	August 8, 1922	
22	Walter F. George (D-GA)	November 22, 1922	
23	James Couzens (R-MI)	November 29, 1922	
24	Simeon Fess (R-OH)	March 4, 1923	Former representative (10 years), Ohio 4th in population (1920)
25	Hubert D. Stephens (D-MS)	March 4, 1923	Former representative (10 years), Mississippi 23rd in population (1920)
26	Clarence Dill (D-WA)	March 4, 1923	Former representative (4 years)
27	Lynn Frazier (R-ND)	March 4, 1923	Former governor
28	Royal S. Copeland (D-NY)	March 4, 1923	New York 1st in population (1920)
29	Henrik Shipstead (FL-MN)	March 4, 1923	Minnesota 17th in population (1920)
30	Robert B. Howell (R-NE)	March 4, 1923	Nebraska 31st in population (1920)
31	Burton K. Wheeler (D-MT)	March 4, 1923	Montana 39th in population (1920)
32	Porter H. Dale (R-VT)	November 7, 1923	
33	Jesse H. Metcalf (R-RI)	November 4, 1924	
34	Thomas D. Schall (R-MN)	March 4, 1925	Former representative
35	Sam G. Bratton (D-NM)	March 4, 1925	
36	Robert M. La Follette, Jr. (R-WI)	September 30, 1925	
37	Arthur Robinson (R-IN)	October 20, 1925	
38	Gerald Nye (R-ND)	November 14, 1925	
39	David I. Walsh (D-MA)	December 6, 1926	
40	Carl Hayden (D-AZ)	March 4, 1927	Former representative (15 years)
41	Alben W. Barkley (D-KY)	March 4, 1927	Former representative (14 years)
42	Elmer Thomas (D-OK)	March 4, 1927	Former representative (4 years), Oklahoma 21st in population (1920)
43	Millard Tydings (D-MD)	March 4, 1927	Former representative (4 years), Maryland 28th in population (1920)
44	Robert F. Wagner (D-NY)	March 4, 1927	New York 1st in population (1920)
45	Hugo Black (D-AL)	March 4, 1927	Alabama 18th in population (1920)
46	Frederick Steiwer (R-OR)	March 4, 1927	Oregon 34th in population (1920)
47	Arthur H. Vandenberg (R-MI)	March 31, 1928	
48	Daniel Hastings (R-DE)	December 10, 1928	
49	Bronson Cutting (R-NM)	March 4, 1929	Previously a senator
50	Tom Connally (D-TX)	March 4, 1929	Former representative (12 years)
51	Roscoe C. Patterson (R-MO)	March 4, 1929	Former representative (2 years)
52	Henry D. Hatfield (R-WV)	March 4, 1929	Former governor, West Virginia 27th in population (1920)
53	Phillips Lee Goldsborough (R-MD)	March 4, 1929	Former governor, Maryland 28th in population (1920)
54	John G. Townsend, Jr. (R-DE)	March 4, 1929	Former governor, Delaware 46th in population (1920)
55	Hamilton Kean (R-NJ)	March 4, 1929	New Jersey 10th in population (1920)
56	Frederic Walcott (R-CT)	March 4, 1929	Connecticut 29th in population (1920)
57	Felix Hebert (R-RI)	March 4, 1929	Rhode Island 38th in population (1920)
58	Robert J. Bulkley (D-OH)	December 1, 1930	Former representative
59	Robert D. Carey (R-WY)	December 1, 1930	Former governor
60	George McGill (D-KS)	December 1, 1930	
61	James J. Davis (R-PA)	December 2, 1930	
62	Thomas Gore (D-OK)	March 4, 1931	Previously a senator (14 years)
63	Matthew M. Neely (D-WV)	March 4, 1931	Previously a senator (6 years), former representative (8 years)
64	J. Hamilton Lewis (D-IL)	March 4, 1931	Previously a senator (6 years), former representative (2 years)
65	James F. Byrnes (D-SC)	March 4, 1931	Former representative (14 years), South Carolina 26th in population (1930)
66	Wallace H. White, Jr. (R-ME)	March 4, 1931	Former representative (14 years), Maine 35th in population (1930)
67	L. J. Dickinson (R-IA)	March 4, 1931	Former representative (12 years)
68	William J. Bulow (D-SD)	March 4, 1931	Former governor
69	Marcus A. Coolidge (D-MA)	March 4, 1931	Massachusetts 8th in population (1930)
70	Josiah W. Bailey (D-NC)	March 4, 1931	North Carolina 12th in population (1930)
71	John H. Bankhead II (D-AL)	March 4, 1931	Alabama 15th in population (1930)
72	Marvel M. Logan (D-KY)	March 4, 1931	Kentucky 17th in population (1930)
73	Edward Costigan (D-CO)	March 4, 1931	Colorado 33rd in population (1930)
74	Warren Austin (R-VT)	April 1, 1931	
75	Hattie Caraway (D-AR)	November 13, 1931	
76	William Warren Barbour (R-NJ)	December 1, 1931	
77	Huey Long (D-LA)	January 25, 1932	
78	Robert R. Reynolds (D-NC)	December 5, 1932	
79	Richard Russell, Jr. (D-GA)	January 12, 1933	
80	Bennett Champ Clark (D-MO)	February 4, 1933	
81	Alva B. Adams (D-CO)	March 4, 1933	Previously a senator
82	Augustine Lonergan (D-CT)	March 4, 1933	Former representative (8 years)
83	William H. Dieterich (D-IL)	March 4, 1933	Former representative (2 years), Illinois 3rd in population (1930)
84	John H. Overton (D-LA)	March 4, 1933	Former representative (2 years), Louisiana 22nd in population (1930)
85	Harry F. Byrd, Sr. (D-VA)	March 4, 1933	Former governor, Virginia 20th in population (1930)
86	Fred H. Brown (D-NH)	March 4, 1933	Former governor, New Hampshire 41st in population (1930)
87	William Gibbs McAdoo (D-CA)	March 4, 1933	California 6th in population (1930)
88	Frederick Van Nuys (D-IN)	March 4, 1933	Indiana 11th in population (1930)
89	F. Ryan Duffy (D-WI)	March 4, 1933	Wisconsin 13th in population (1930)
90	Nathan L. Bachman (D-TN)	March 4, 1933	Tennessee 16th in population (1930)
91	Louis Murphy (D-IA)	March 4, 1933	Iowa 19th in population (1930)
92	Homer T. Bone (D-WA)	March 4, 1933	Washington 30th in population (1930)
93	Elbert D. Thomas (D-UT)	March 4, 1933	Utah 40th in population (1930)
94	James Pope (D-ID)	March 4, 1933	Idaho 42nd in population (1930)
95	Pat McCarran (D-NV)	March 4, 1933	Nevada 48th in population (1930)
96	John E. Erickson (D-MT)	March 13, 1933	
	William H. Thompson (D-NE)	May 24, 1933	
	Carl Hatch (D-NM)	October 10, 1933	
	Ernest W. Gibson (R-VT)	November 21, 1933	
	Joseph C. O'Mahoney (D-WY)	January 1, 1934	
	Richard Hunter (D-NE)	November 7, 1934	Nebraska 32nd in population (1930)
	James Murray (D-MT)	November 7, 1934	Montana 39th in population (1930)

== See also ==
- 73rd United States Congress
- List of United States representatives in the 73rd Congress
