= Kentucky's at-large congressional district =

Coordinates: 37.5°N 85°W

- Obsolete district
- Created: 1930
- Eliminated: 1935
- Years active: 1933–1935 (5 years)

For the 73rd Congress (March 4, 1933 – January 3, 1935), Kentucky did not use a district election format, but instead, elected all representatives in a statewide, at-large manner. The district format was returned during the 74th Congress and has been used in all congressional sessions thereafter. On September 3, 1932 United States District Judge Andrew M. J. Cochran of the United States District Court for the Eastern District of Kentucky ruled in favor of the plaintiff in Hume v. Mahan, 1 F. Supp. 142 – Dist. Court, ED Kentucky 1932, striking down the "Kentucky Redistricting Act of 1932" passed by the Kentucky General Assembly that had established at-large congressional elections for the 1932 general election.

== List of members representing the district ==
All served March 4, 1933 to January 3, 1935.

Member	Party	Years	Cong ress	Electoral history
John Y. Brown Sr. (Lexington)	Democratic	March 4, 1933 – January 3, 1935	73rd	Elected in 1932. Lost renomination.
Cap R. Carden (Munfordville)	Democratic	March 4, 1933 – January 3, 1935	73rd	Redistricted from the 4th district and re-elected in 1932. Redistricted to the 4th district.
Glover H. Cary (Owensboro)	Democratic	March 4, 1933 – January 3, 1935	73rd	Redistricted from the 2nd district and re-elected in 1932. Redistricted to the 2nd district.
Virgil Chapman (Paris)	Democratic	March 4, 1933 – January 3, 1935	73rd	Redistricted from the 7th district and re-elected in 1932. Redistricted to the 6th district.
W. Voris Gregory (Mayfield)	Democratic	March 4, 1933 – January 3, 1935	73rd	Redistricted from the 1st district and re-elected in 1932. Redistricted to the 1st district.
Finley Hamilton (London)	Democratic	March 4, 1933 – January 3, 1935	73rd	Elected in 1932. Retired.
Andrew J. May (Prestonsburg)	Democratic	March 4, 1933 – January 3, 1935	73rd	Redistricted from the 10th district and re-elected in 1932. Redistricted to the 7th district.
Brent Spence (Fort Thomas)	Democratic	March 4, 1933 – January 3, 1935	73rd	Redistricted from the 6th district and re-elected in 1932. Redistricted to the 5th district.
Fred M. Vinson (Ashland)	Democratic	March 4, 1933 – January 3, 1935	73rd	Redistricted from the 9th district and re-elected in 1932. Redistricted to the 8th district.

== Election results ==
Kentucky's At-Large Congressional General Election (1932)
Party	Candidate	Votes	%
Democratic	Fred M. Vinson (incumbent)	575,191	59.26
Democratic	John Y. Brown Sr.	574,270	
Democratic	Andrew J. May (incumbent)	574,189	
Democratic	Brent Spence (incumbent)	574,079	
Democratic	Virgil Chapman (incumbent)	573,750	
Democratic	Glover H. Cary (incumbent)	573,505	
Democratic	William Voris Gregory (incumbent)	573,269	
Democratic	Cap R. Carden (incumbent)	573,257	
Democratic	Finley Hamilton	573,024	
Republican	Hillard H. Smith	391,868	40.37
Republican	Robert Blackburn	391,674	
Republican	William Lewis	390,982	
Republican	George P. Ellison	390,739	
Republican	D.E. McClure	390,474	
Republican	J.C. Speight	390,370	
Republican	Hugh H. Asher	390,148	
Republican	B.T. Roundtree	390,041	
Republican	Frank B. Russell	389,950	
Socialist	John T. Scopes	3,273	0.33
Socialist	J.J. Thobe	3,264	
Socialist	C.E. Trimble	3,260	
Socialist	W.G. Haag	3,259	
Socialist	E. L. Nance	3,256	
Socialist	E.C. Schulz	3,256	
Socialist	J.M. Woodward	3,255	
Socialist	H.L. Harwood	3,254	
Socialist	D.S. Bennett	3,252	
Communist	Frank Reynolds	241	0.04
Communist	George N. Conway	236	
Total votes			
Turnout			
Democratic hold			
