= Beverly M. Vincent =

American politician (1890–1980)

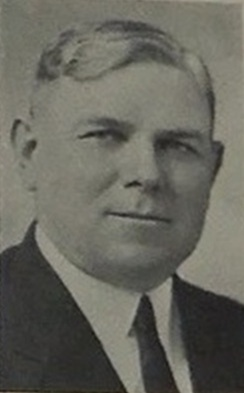

Member of the U.S. House of Representatives from Kentucky's 2nd district
- In office March 2, 1937 – January 3, 1945
- Preceded by: Glover H. Cary
- Succeeded by: Earle Clements

32nd Attorney General of Kentucky
- In office January 6, 1936 – March 1937
- Governor: Happy Chandler
- Preceded by: Bailey P. Wootton
- Succeeded by: Hubert Meredith

Member of the Kentucky Senate from the 11th district
- In office January 1, 1928 – January 1, 1932
- Preceded by: Almom A. Demunbrum
- Succeeded by: Thomas C. Ferguson

Personal details
- Born: Beverly Mills Vincent; March 28, 1890 Brownsville, Kentucky, U.S.
- Died: August 15, 1980 (aged 90) Brownsville, Kentucky, U.S.
- Party: Democratic

Beverly Mills Vincent (March 28, 1890 – August 15, 1980) was a U.S. representative from Kentucky.

He was born in Brownsville, Edmonson County, Kentucky, March 28, 1890; attended the public schools, Western Kentucky State Teachers College at Bowling Green, and the law department of the University of Kentucky at Lexington; was admitted to the bar in 1915 and commenced practice in Brownsville, Kentucky. He was county judge of Edmonson County, Kentucky from 1916 to 1918.

During the First World War he served as a private in Battery A, 72nd Field Artillery Regiment at Camp Knox, Kentucky, from August 27, 1918, to January 9, 1919.

He was an assistant attorney general of Kentucky in 1919–20; a member of the Kentucky Senate in 1928–1932 and presidential elector for the Democratic ticket in 1932. He was elected attorney general of Kentucky in 1935, serving from 1936 until his resignation in March 1937, when he wad nominated by the Democratic Party to as its candidate in a special election to fill the vacancy caused by the death of United States Representative Glover H. Cary of Owensboro, and was elected to fill the unexpired trem. He was elected to the three succeeding Congresses (March 2, 1937 – January 3, 1945).

In 1940, Congressman Vincent struck Congressman Martin Sweeney on the floor of the U.S. House of Representatives as the House debated conscription during World War II. Sweeney opposed the draft bill; Vincent called him a "traitor", which led to the fistfight. As quoted in Time magazine "ancient Doorkeeper Joseph Sinnot [who favored the draft] said it was the best blow he had heard in his 50 years in the House."

He filed for re-election for the Seventy-ninth Congress in 1944, but withdrew, ceding the nomination to state Senate Majority Leader Earle Clements of Morganfield, who had challenged him. He ran unsuccessfully for the state Court of Appeals in 1958 and the state Senate in 1969. He resumed the practice of law, pursued agricultural interests, and was a resident of Brownsville, Kentucky, until his death there on August 15, 1980.

U.S. House of Representatives
| Preceded by Glover H. Cary | Member of the U.S. House of Representatives from Kentucky's 2nd congressional district 1937 – 1945 | Succeeded by Earle C. Clements |
