= Patrick B. O'Sullivan =

American politician (1887–1978)

Patrick O'Sullivan
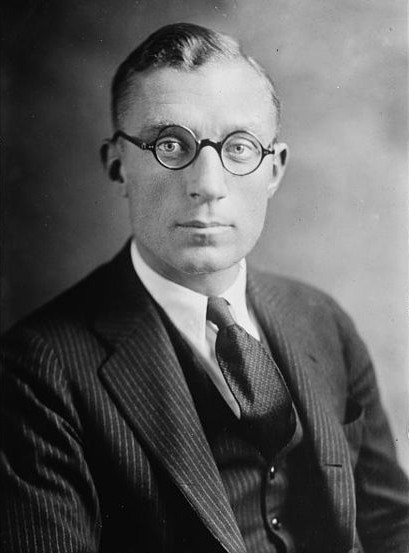

Chief Justice of the Connecticut Supreme Court
- In office April 9, 1957 – August 11, 1957
- Appointed by: Chester B. Bowles

Associate Justice of the Connecticut Supreme Court
- In office 1950 – April 8, 1957
- Appointed by: Chester B. Bowles

Member of the U.S. House of Representatives from Connecticut's 5th district
- In office March 4, 1923 – March 3, 1925
- Preceded by: James P. Glynn
- Succeeded by: James P. Glynn

Personal details
- Born: August 11, 1887 Derby, Connecticut, U.S.
- Died: November 10, 1978 (aged 91) Orange, Connecticut, U.S
- Party: Democratic
- Education: Yale University; Georgetown University

Military service
- Allegiance: United States of America
- Branch/service: United States Navy
- Battles/wars: World War I

Patrick Brett O'Sullivan (August 11, 1887 – November 10, 1978) was a U.S. representative from Connecticut.

Born in Derby, Connecticut, O'Sullivan attended public schools. He graduated from Yale University in 1908, from Georgetown University, Washington, D.C., in 1909, and from Yale Law School in 1913. He was admitted to the bar in 1913 and commenced practice in Derby. He was the Corporation counsel of Derby from 1914 to 1917. He served as delegate to the Democratic National Convention in 1916. He served as member of the State senate and was its minority leader in 1917. In 1918, during the First World War, he resigned from the State senate to enlist in the United States Navy.

O'Sullivan was elected as a Democrat to the Sixty-eighth Congress (March 4, 1923 – March 3, 1925). He was an unsuccessful candidate for reelection in 1924 to the Sixty-ninth Congress. He then resumed the practice of law and served as associate professor of law at the Yale Law School. He served as judge of the Connecticut Superior Court from 1931 to 1950, associate justice of Connecticut Supreme Court 1950-1957, and chief justice in 1957, serving from April 9 to August 11 of that year, when he reached the mandatory retirement age. He continued serving as a State trial referee in New Haven. He was co-chairman of the Constitutional Convention in 1965. He resided in Orange, Connecticut, where he died on November 10, 1978. He was interred in St. Lawrence Cemetery, West Haven, Connecticut.

Political offices
Preceded by William M. Maltbie	Justice of the Connecticut Supreme Court; 1950–1957	Succeeded by James E. Murphy
U.S. House of Representatives
Preceded by James P. Glynn	Member of the U.S. House of Representatives from Connecticut's 5th congressional district March 4, 1923 – March 3, 1925	Succeeded by James P. Glynn
