= James P. Glynn =

American politician (1867–1930)

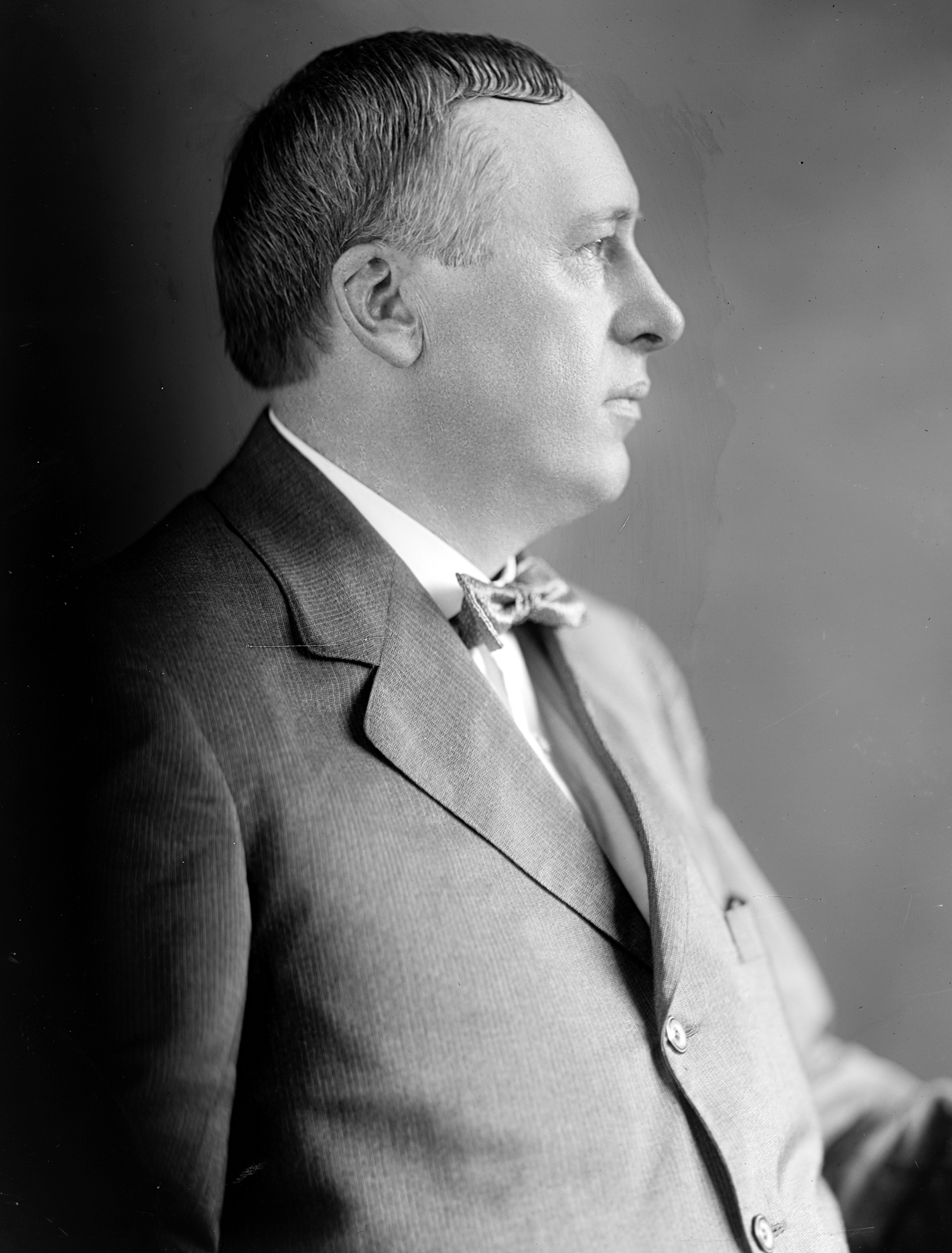

Member of the U.S. House of Representatives from Connecticut's 5th district
- In office March 4, 1915 – March 3, 1923; March 4, 1925 – March 6, 1930
- Preceded by: William Kennedy; Patrick B. O'Sullivan
- Succeeded by: Patrick B. O'Sullivan; Edward W. Goss

Personal details
- Born: November 12, 1867 Winsted, Connecticut, U.S.
- Died: March 6, 1930 (aged 62) Washington, D.C., U.S
- Party: Republican

James Peter Glynn (November 12, 1867 – March 6, 1930) was a U.S. representative from Connecticut.

Born in Winsted, Connecticut, the son of Irish immigrants, Glynn attended the public schools. He studied law. He was admitted to the bar in 1895 and commenced practice in Winsted, Connecticut. Town clerk 1892-1902. He served as prosecuting attorney of the town court 1899-1902. Postmaster of Winsted 1902-1914.

Glynn was elected as a Republican to the Sixty-fourth and to the three succeeding Congresses (March 4, 1915 – March 3, 1923). He served as chairman of the Committee on Expenditures in the Post Office Department (Sixty-seventh Congress). He was an unsuccessful candidate for reelection in 1922 to the Sixty-eighth Congress.

Glynn was elected to the Sixty-ninth, Seventieth, and Seventy-first Congresses and served from March 4, 1925, until his death on a train near Washington, D.C., March 6, 1930. He was interred in the new St. Joseph's Cemetery, Winsted, Connecticut.

== See also ==
- List of members of the United States Congress who died in office (1900–1949)

U.S. House of Representatives
Preceded by William Kennedy	Member of the U.S. House of Representatives from Connecticut's 5th congressional district March 4, 1915 – March 3, 1923	Succeeded by Patrick B. O'Sullivan
Preceded by Patrick B. O'Sullivan	Member of the U.S. House of Representatives from Connecticut's 5th congressional district March 4, 1925 – March 6, 1930	Succeeded by Edward W. Goss
