= Noble J. Gregory =

American politician

Noble Jones Gregory
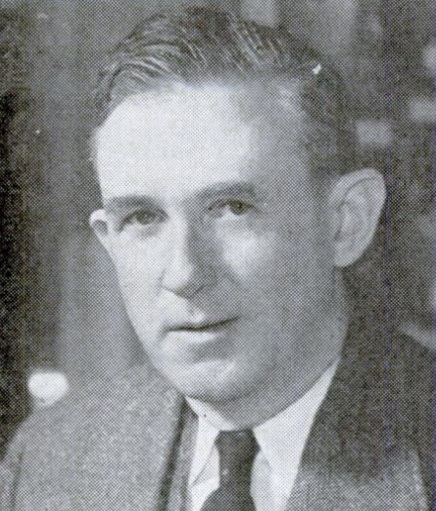
- From Pocket Congressional Directory of the 83rd Congress

Member of the U.S. House of Representatives from Kentucky's 1st district
- In office January 3, 1937 – January 3, 1959
- Preceded by: William Voris Gregory
- Succeeded by: Frank Stubblefield

Personal details
- Born: August 30, 1897 Mayfield, Kentucky, U.S.
- Died: September 26, 1971 (aged 74)
- Resting place: Mayfield, Kentucky
- Party: Democratic

Noble Jones Gregory (August 30, 1897 – September 26, 1971) was a Democrat who represented Kentucky for eleven terms in the United States House of Representatives from 1937 to 1959.

== Biography ==
Gregory was born and raised in Mayfield, Kentucky. One of his siblings was an older brother, William Voris Gregory, who became a politician and U.S. congressman.

The younger Gregory worked in various positions at the First National Bank of Mayfield from 1917 through 1936. From 1923 to 1936 he also served as secretary-treasurer of the Mayfield Board of Education.

In 1936 William Voris Gregory, in his fifth congressional term, had already been re-nominated by the Democratic Party when he died on October 10 of that year. The party nominated Noble Jones Gregory for his late brother's seat. A month later the younger Gregory was elected to the U.S. House, representing the 1st district in the far western part of Kentucky. He was re-elected ten times, serving a total of 22 years.

At this time, the Democratic primary was the only competitive contest in this part of the state, which overwhelmingly supported Democratic candidates. Most blacks, who had previously supported the Republican Party, were still disenfranchised. Gregory did not sign the 1956 Southern Manifesto but voted against the Civil Rights Act of 1957.

In 1958 Gregory sought re-nomination to his seat but was defeated in the Democratic primary by Frank Stubblefield, who went on to win the general election. After his defeat, Gregory returned to the banking and investment business in Mayfield. He is buried in Maplewood Cemetery in Mayfield.

== Bibliography ==
- United States Congress. "Noble J. Gregory (id: G000447)". Biographical Directory of the United States Congress.

U.S. House of Representatives
Preceded by William Voris Gregory	Member of the U.S. House of Representatives from Kentucky's 1st congressional district 1937 – 1959	Succeeded by Frank Stubblefield
