= Frank Stubblefield =

American politician

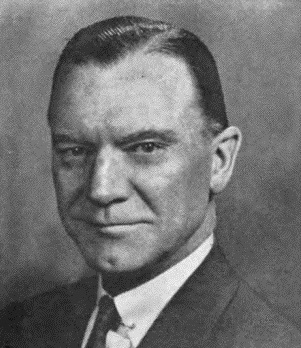

Member of the U.S. House of Representatives from Kentucky's 1st district
- In office January 3, 1959 – December 31, 1974
- Preceded by: Noble J. Gregory
- Succeeded by: Carroll Hubbard

Personal details
- Born: April 5, 1907 Murray, Kentucky, U.S.
- Died: October 14, 1977 (aged 70) Murray, Kentucky, U.S.
- Party: Democratic
- Education: University of Kentucky
- Profession: businessman

Frank Albert Stubblefield (April 5, 1907 – October 14, 1977), a Democrat, represented Kentucky in the United States House of Representatives.

Stubblefield was born and schooled in Kentucky and attended the University of Arizona for one year in 1927. He received a degree from the University of Kentucky in 1932 and went into business in Murray, Kentucky where he was elected to the city council. Stubblefield served as a lieutenant in the United States Navy during World War II.

He was elected to the Kentucky Railroad Commission in 1951 and re-elected in 1955. In 1958 he sought election to the U.S. House from Kentucky's 1st congressional district in the far western part of the state. Stubblefield defeated incumbent Congressman Noble J. Gregory in the Democratic primary and won the seat in the general election. He resigned from the Railroad Commission on December 31, 1958, and began his congressional service on January 3, 1959.

Stubblefield won re-election seven times. He sought re-nomination in 1974 but lost the Democratic primary to state senator Carroll Hubbard, who went on to win the general election.

Stubblefield voted in favor of the Civil Rights Acts of 1960 and 1968, and the Voting Rights Act of 1965, but voted against the Civil Rights Act of 1964. He had a mainly liberal voting record in Congress.

After leaving the House Stubblefield returned to Murray, where he is buried in the Murray City Cemetery. He was a distant cousin of inventor Nathan Stubblefield.

U.S. House of Representatives
Preceded by Noble J. Gregory	Member of the U.S. House of Representatives from Kentucky's 1st congressional district 1959 – 1974	Succeeded by Carroll Hubbard
