= James E. Murphy =

Supreme Court justice in Connecticut

James E. Murphy (1897-1986) was a Supreme Court justice in Connecticut. Murphy served in the US Army during World War I and following it, attended Notre Dame Law School from which he graduated in 1923. Following graduation, Murphy joined Delaney, Murphy & Kotler, a law firm in Bridgeport, Connecticut. In 1941, he joined the Superior Court bench and served as a member of the state supreme court from 1957 to August 1966. He died of cancer on May 12, 1986 at the Connecticut Hospice in Branford, Connecticut.

He was succeeded on the court by Elmer W. Ryan.

Political offices
Preceded by Patrick B. O'Sullivan	Justice of the Connecticut Supreme Court; 1957–1966	Succeeded by Elmer W. Ryan
