= William Kennedy (Connecticut politician) =

American politician (1854–1918)

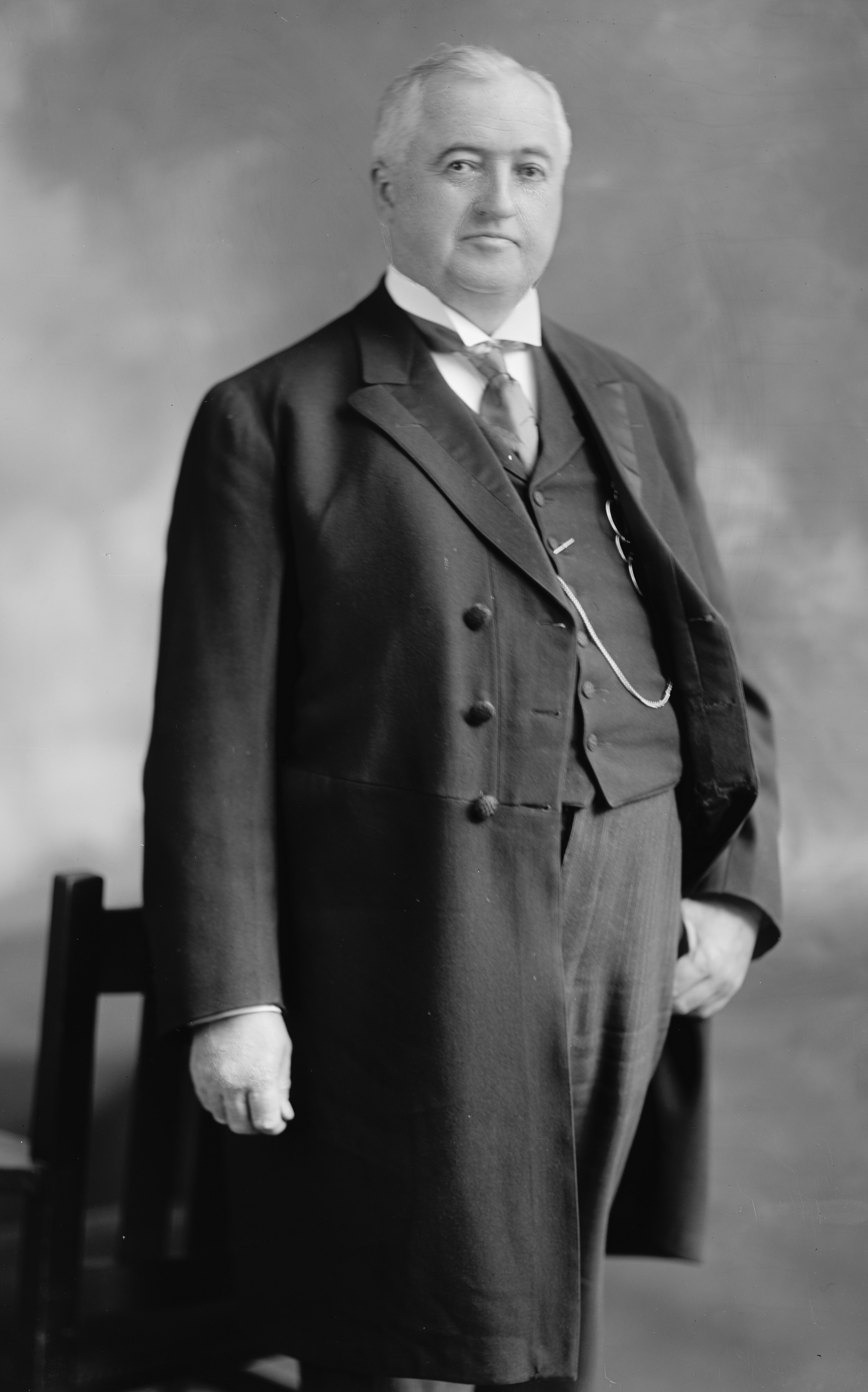
- Portrait of Kennedy

Member of the U.S. House of Representatives from Connecticut's 5th district
- In office March 4, 1913 – March 3, 1915
- Preceded by: Truman Smith
- Succeeded by: James P. Glynn

Member of the Connecticut Senate
- In office 1899–1901

Personal details
- Born: December 19, 1854 Naugatuck, Connecticut, U.S.
- Died: June 19, 1918 (aged 63) Naugatuck, Connecticut, U.S
- Resting place: St. James' Cemetery
- Party: Democratic
- Spouse: Mary K. Clerkin (m. 1882)
- Children: 3
- Occupation: Politician; lawyer

William Kennedy (December 19, 1854 – June 19, 1918) was a U.S. representative from Connecticut.

== Early life ==
William Kennedy was born on December 19, 1854, in Naugatuck, Connecticut. He attended public schools and later studied law. He was admitted to the bar in September 1879.

== Career ==
Kennedy commenced a law practice in Naugatuck, Connecticut. He was attorney for the town and borough of Naugatuck from 1893 to 1918. He defended Sophie Kritchman in a murder case. Kennedy also served as member on Naugatuck's board of education from 1901 to 1918. He was chairman of the Naugatuck Democratic Town Committee and clerk of the Borough Court.

Kennedy served as a member of the Connecticut Senate from 1899 to 1901. He was a delegate to the Democratic National Conventions in 1896, 1900, 1908, and 1912.He was chairman of the Democratic State Committee in 1896 and 1898.

Kennedy was elected as a Democrat to the 63rd United States Congress in 1912 and represented Connecticut's 5th Congressional District from March 4, 1913, to March 3, 1915. He was an unsuccessful candidate for re-election in 1914 and resumed his law practice. He is known to have corresponded with Woodrow Wilson on policy matters, particularly during Wilson's presidential election campaign and during World War I.

== Personal life ==
Kennedy married Mary K. Clerkin of New Haven on November 29, 1882. They had three children, Mrs. Charles F. Mitchell, Louis and Julia Z. He had a summer home in Woodmont.

Kennedy died on June 19, 1918, in Naugatuck, Connecticut. He was interred in St. James' Cemetery.

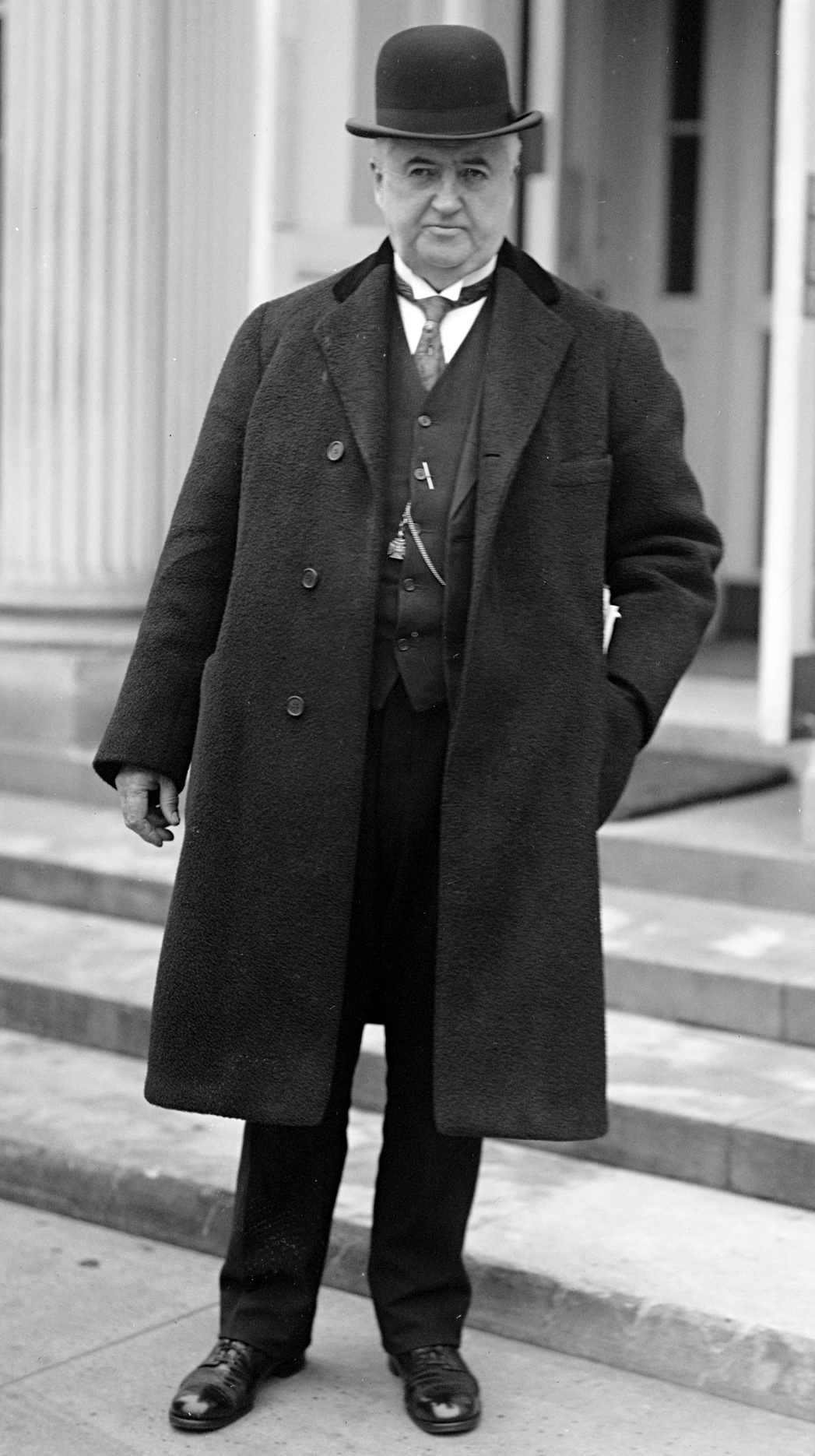
William Kennedy in 1914

U.S. House of Representatives
Preceded by District re-created	Member of the U.S. House of Representatives from Connecticut's 5th congressional district March 4, 1913 – March 3, 1915	Succeeded by James P. Glynn
