= 73rd United States Congress =

1933–1935 U.S. Congress

←	72nd	74th	→
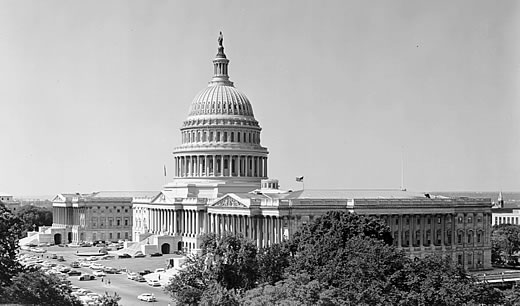
- United States Capitol (1956)

Overview
- Legislative body: United States Congress
- Jurisdiction: United States
- Term: March 4, 1933 – January 3, 1935

Senate
- Members: 96
- President: John N. Garner (D)
- President pro tempore: Key Pittman (D)
- Party control: Democratic

House of Representatives
- Members: 435 representatives 5 non-voting delegates
- Speaker: Henry T. Rainey (D) (until August 19, 1934)
- Party control: Democratic

Sessions
- Special (Note: Special session of the Senate.): March 4, 1933 – March 6, 1933
- 1st: March 9, 1933 – June 15, 1933
- 2nd: January 3, 1934 – June 18, 1934

The 73rd United States Congress was a meeting of the legislative branch of the United States federal government, composed of the United States Senate and the United States House of Representatives. It met in Washington, D.C. from March 4, 1933, to January 3, 1935, during the first two years of Franklin D. Roosevelt's presidency. Because of the newly ratified 20th Amendment, the duration of this Congress, along with the term of office of those elected to it, was shortened by 60 days. The apportionment of seats in the House of Representatives was based on the 1930 United States census.

The Democrats greatly increased their majority in the House, and won control of the Senate for the first time since the 65th Congress in 1917. With Franklin D. Roosevelt being sworn in as president on March 4, 1933, this gave the Democrats an overall federal government trifecta, also for the first time since the 65th Congress.

== Major events ==
- March 4, 1933: Franklin D. Roosevelt became President of the United States
- January 3, 1934: The second session of 73rd Congress convened as mandated by the Twentieth Amendment to the United States Constitution, that had been ratified one year earlier
- August 19, 1934: House Speaker Henry Thomas Rainey died of a heart attack. The House had already completed its work for this Congress and had already adjourned. No Speaker was elected until the next Congress.

== Major legislation ==
=== First Session ===
The first session of Congress, known as the "Hundred Days", took place before the regular seating and was called by President Roosevelt specifically to pass two acts:

- March 9, 1933: The Emergency Banking Act (ch. 1, 48 Stat. 1) was enacted within four hours of its introduction. It was prompted by the "bank holiday" and was the first step in Roosevelt's "first hundred days" of the New Deal. The Act was drafted in large part by officials appointed by the Hoover administration. The bill provided for the Treasury Department to initiate reserve requirements and a federal bailout to large failing institutions. It also removed the United States from the Gold Standard. All banks had to undergo a federal inspection to deem if they were stable enough to re-open. Within a week 1/3 of the banks re-opened in the United States and faith was, in large part, restored in the banking system. The act had few opponents, only taking fire from the farthest left elements of Congress who wanted to nationalize banks altogether.
- March 20, 1933: The Economy Act of 1933. Roosevelt, in sending this act to Congress, warned that if it did not pass, the country faced a billion-dollar deficit. The act balanced the federal budget by cutting the salaries of government employees and cutting pensions to veterans by as much as 15 percent. It intended to reassure the deficit hawks that the new president was fiscally conservative. Although the act was heavily protested by left-leaning members of congress, it passed by an overwhelming margin.

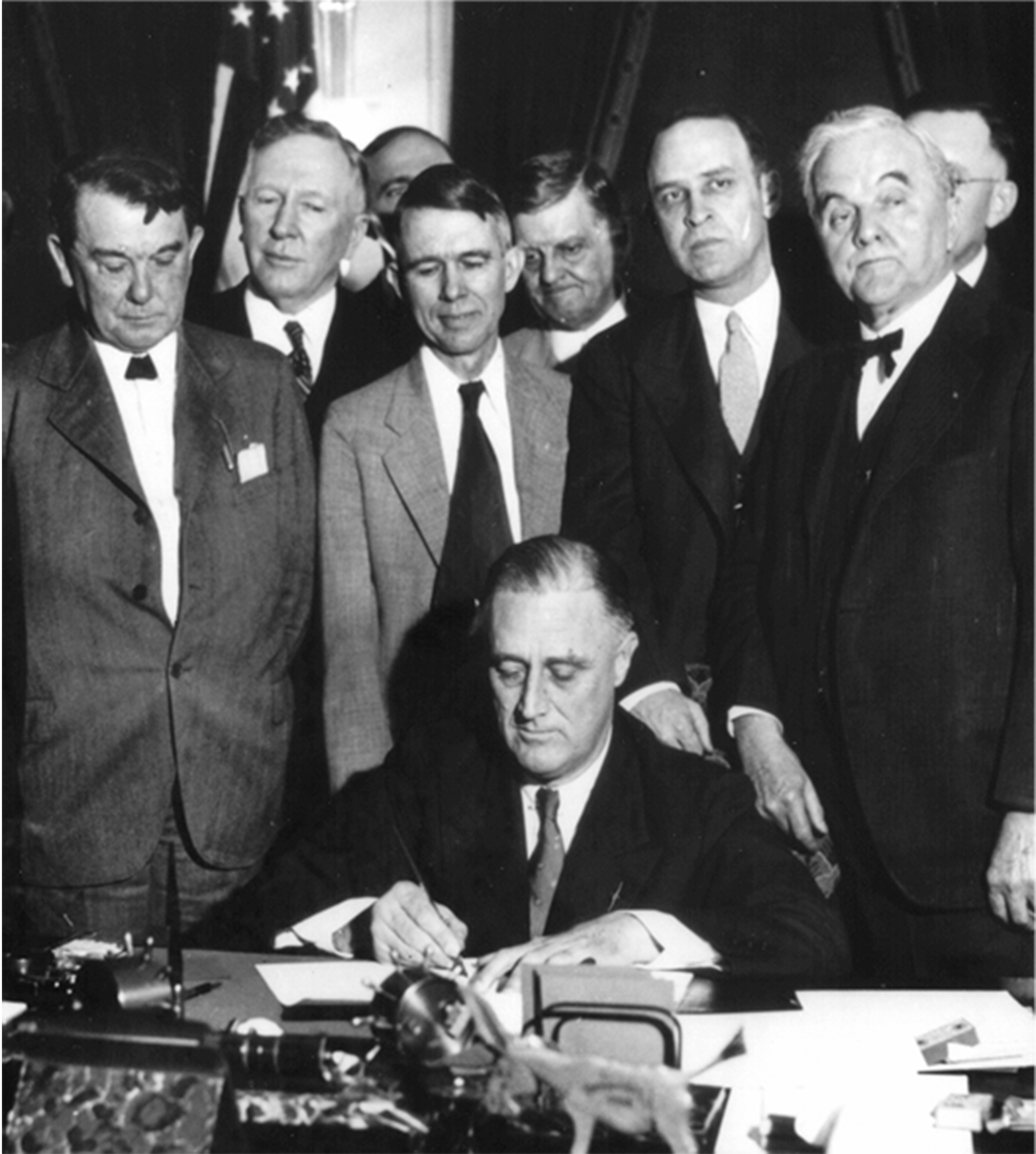
President Franklin D. Roosevelt signs the Tennessee Valley Authority Act

The session also passed several other major pieces of legislation:

- March 31, 1933: The Civilian Conservation Corps Reforestation Relief Act (ch. 17, 48 Stat. 22) established the Civilian Conservation Corps (CCC) as a means to combat unemployment and poverty.
- May 12, 1933: The Agricultural Adjustment Act (ch. 25, 48 Stat. 31) was part of a plan developed by Roosevelt's Secretary of Agriculture, Henry A. Wallace, and was designed to protect American farmers from the uncertainties of the depression through subsidies and production controls. The act laid the frame for long-term government control in the planning of the agricultural sector. In 1936 the act was ruled unconstitutional by the United States Supreme Court because it taxed one group to pay for another.
- May 12, 1933: The Federal Emergency Relief Act (ch. 30, 48 Stat. 55) established the Federal Emergency Relief Administration (FERA) which develop public works projects to give work to the unemployed.
- May 18, 1933: The Tennessee Valley Authority Act (ch. 32, 48 Stat. 58) created the Tennessee Valley Authority to relieve the Tennessee Valley by a series of public works projects.
- June 5, 1933: The Securities Act of 1933 (ch. 38, 48 Stat. 74) established the Securities Exchange Commission (SEC) as a way for the government to prevent a repeat of the Stock Market Crash of 1929.
- June 12, 1933: The Glass–Steagall Act of 1933 (ch. 89, 48 Stat. 162) was a follow-up to the Glass–Steagall Act of 1932. Both acts sought to make banking safer and less prone to speculation. The 1933 act, however, established the Federal Deposit Insurance Corporation.
- June 16, 1933: The National Industrial Recovery Act ("NIRA", ch. 90, 48 Stat. 195) was an anti-deflation scheme promoted by the Chamber of Commerce that reversed anti-trust laws and permit trade associations to cooperate in stabilizing prices within their industries while making businesses ensure that the incomes of workers would rise along with their prices. It guaranteed to workers of the right of collective bargaining and helped spur major union organizing drives in major industries. In case consumer buying power lagged behind, thereby defeating the administration's initiatives, the NIRA created the Public Works Administration (PWA), a major program of public works spending designed to alleviate unemployment, and moreover to transfer funds to certain beneficiaries. The NIRA established the most important, but ultimately least successful provision: a new federal agency known as the National Recovery Administration (NRA), which attempted to stabilize prices and wages through cooperative "code authorities" involving government, business, and labor. The NIRA was seen hailed as a miracle, responding to the needs of labor, business, unemployment, and the deflation crisis. The "sick chicken case" led to the Supreme Court invalidating NIRA in 1935.

=== Second Session ===
- March 24, 1934: The Tydings–McDuffie Act (Pub. L. 73–127, 48 Stat. 456) provided for self-government for the Commonwealth of the Philippines and a pathway to independence.
- June 6, 1934: The Securities Exchange Act of 1934 (ch. 404, 48 Stat. 881) grew out of the Securities Act of 1933 and regulated participation in financial markets.
- June 19, 1934: Communications Act of 1934 (ch. 652, 48 Stat. 1064, Pub. L. 73–416)
- June 26, 1934: The National Firearms Act of 1934 (ch. 757, 48 Stat. 1236) regulated machine guns, short-barreled rifles and shotguns.

== Constitutional amendments ==
- December 5, 1933: Twenty-first Amendment to the United States Constitution, repealing the eighteenth amendment and thus ending prohibition in the United States, was ratified by the requisite number of states (then 36) to become part of the Constitution

== Hearings ==
=== "Merchants of Death" ===
- Committee: United States Senate Special Committee on Investigation of the Munitions Industry
- Chairman: Senator Gerald P. Nye (R)
- Duration: September 4, 1934 – February 24, 1936

The Senate Munitions Committee came into existence solely for the purpose of this hearing. Although World War I had been over for sixteen years, there were revived reports that America's leading munition companies had effectively influenced the United States into that conflict, which killed 53,000 Americans, hence the companies' nickname "Merchants of Death".

The Democratic Party, controlling the Senate for the first time since the first world war, used the hype of these reports to organize the hearing in hopes of nationalizing America's munitions industry. The Democrats chose a Republican renowned for his ardent isolationist policies, Senator Gerald P. Nye of North Dakota, to head the hearing. Nye was typical of western agrarian progressives, and adamantly opposed America's involvement in any foreign war. Nye declared at the opening of the hearing "when the Senate investigation is over, we shall see that war and preparation for war is not a matter of national honor and national defense, but a matter of profit for the few."

Over the next 18 months, the "Nye Committee" (as newspapers called it) held 93 hearings, questioning more than 200 witnesses, including J.P. Morgan Jr. and Pierre du Pont. Committee members found little hard evidence of an active conspiracy among arms makers, yet the panel's reports did little to weaken the popular prejudice against "greedy munitions interests."

The hearings overlapped the 73rd and 74th Congresses. They only came to an end after Chairman Nye provoked the Democratic caucus into cutting off funding. Nye, in the last hearing the Committee held in early 1936, attacked former Democratic President Woodrow Wilson, suggesting that Wilson had withheld essential information from Congress as it considered a declaration of war. Democratic leaders, including Appropriations Committee Chairman Carter Glass of Virginia, unleashed a furious response against Nye for "dirtdaubing the sepulcher of Woodrow Wilson." Standing before cheering colleagues in a packed Senate chamber, Glass slammed his fist onto his desk in protest until blood dripped from his knuckles, effectively prompting the Democratic caucus to withhold all funding for further hearings.

Although the "Nye Committee" failed to achieve its goal of nationalizing the arms industry, it inspired three congressional neutrality acts in the mid-1930s that signaled profound American opposition to overseas involvement.

== Party summary ==
For details, see Changes in membership, below.

=== Senate ===
There were 48 states with two senators per state, thus giving the Senate 96 seats. Membership changed with four deaths, one resignation, and two appointees who were replaced by electees.

	Party (shading indicates majority caucus)				Total	
	Democratic	Farmer–Labor	Progressive	Republican	Total	Vacant
End of previous Congress	46	1	0	48	95	1
Begin (March 4, 1933)	58	1	0	36	95	1
March 11, 1933	58	1	0	35	94	2
March 13, 1933	59	1	0	35	95	1
May 24, 1933	60	1	0	35	96	0
June 24, 1933	59	1	0	35	95	1
October 6, 1933	59	1	0	34	94	2
October 10, 1933	60	1	0	34	95	1
November 3, 1933	59	1	0	34	94	2
November 21, 1933	59	1	0	35	95	1
January 1, 1934	60	1	0	35	96	0
Final voting share	62.5%	1.0%	0.0%	36.5%		
Beginning of next Congress	70	1	1	23	95	1

=== House of Representatives ===
Membership changed with twelve deaths and three resignations.

	Party (shading indicates majority caucus)				Total	
	Democratic	Farmer–Labor	Progressive	Republican	Total	Vacant
End of previous Congress	220	1	0	206	428	8
Begin (March 4, 1933)	311	5	0	117	433	2
April 22, 1933	312	5	0	117	434	1
April 29, 1933	311	5	0	117	433	2
May 12, 1933	310	5	0	117	432	3
May 17, 1933	309	5	0	117	431	4
June 19, 1933	308	5	0	117	430	5
June 22, 1933	307	5	0	117	429	6
June 24, 1933	308	5	0	117	430	5
July 5, 1933	309	5	0	117	431	4
August 27, 1933	309	5	0	116	430	5
September 23, 1933	308	5	0	116	429	6
October 3, 1933	309	5	0	116	430	5
October 19, 1933	309	5	0	115	429	6
November 5, 1933	309	5	0	114	428	7
November 7, 1933	310	5	0	114	429	6
November 14, 1933	311	5	0	114	430	5
November 28, 1933	312	5	0	114	431	4
December 19, 1933	313	5	0	113	431	4
December 28, 1933	313	5	0	114	432	3
January 16, 1934	313	5	0	115	433	2
January 30, 1934	313	5	0	116	434	1
April 1, 1934	312	5	0	116	433	2
May 1, 1934	313	5	0	116	434	1
May 29, 1934	313	5	0	115	433	2
June 8, 1934	312	5	0	115	432	3
July 7, 1934	313	5	0	115	433	2
August 19, 1934	312	5	0	115	432	3
August 22, 1934	309	5	0	115	431	4
September 30, 1934	309	5	0	113	427	8
Final voting share	72.4%	1.2%	0.0%	26.4%		
Beginning of next Congress	322	3	7	102	435	1

== Leadership ==
Section contents: Senate: Majority (D), Minority (R) • House: Majority (D), Minority (R)

=== Senate ===
- President: John Nance Garner (D)
- President pro tempore: Key Pittman (D)

==== Majority (Democratic) leadership ====
- Majority Leader and Democratic Conference Chairman: Joseph T. Robinson
- Assistant Majority Leader (Majority Whip): J. Hamilton Lewis
- Democratic Caucus Secretary: Hugo Black

==== Minority (Republican) leadership ====
- Minority Leader: Charles L. McNary
- Assistant Minority Leader (Minority Whip): Felix Hebert
- Republican Conference Chairman: Charles L. McNary
- Republican Conference Secretary: Frederick Hale
- National Senatorial Committee Chair: Daniel O. Hastings

=== House of Representatives ===
- Speaker: Henry T. Rainey (D), until August 19, 1934 (Vacant thereafter)

==== Majority (Democratic) leadership ====
- Majority Leader: Joseph W. Byrns
- Majority Whip: Arthur H. Greenwood
- Democratic Caucus Chairman: Clarence F. Lea

==== Minority (Republican) leadership ====
- Minority Leader: Bertrand H. Snell
- Minority Whip: Harry L. Englebright
- Republican Conference Chairman: Robert Luce
- Republican Campaign Committee Chairman: Chester C. Bolton

== Members ==
=== Senate ===
Senators are popularly elected statewide every two years, with one-third beginning new six-year terms with each Congress. Preceding the names in the list below are Senate class numbers, which indicate the cycle of their election, In this Congress, Class 1 meant their term ended with this Congress, requiring reelection in 1934; Class 2 meant their term began in the last Congress, requiring reelection in 1936; and Class 3 meant their term began in this Congress, requiring reelection in 1938.

==== Alabama ====
▌2. John H. Bankhead II (D)
▌3. Hugo Black (D)

==== Arizona ====
▌1. Henry F. Ashurst (D)
▌3. Carl Hayden (D)

==== Arkansas ====
▌2. Joseph Taylor Robinson (D)
▌3. Hattie Caraway (D)

==== California ====
▌1. Hiram W. Johnson (R)
▌2. William G. McAdoo (D)

==== Colorado ====
▌2. Edward P. Costigan (D)
▌3. Alva B. Adams (D)

==== Connecticut ====
▌1. Frederic C. Walcott (R)
▌3. Augustine Lonergan (D)

==== Delaware ====
▌1. John G. Townsend Jr. (R)
▌2. Daniel O. Hastings (R)

==== Florida ====
▌1. Park Trammell (D)
▌3. Duncan U. Fletcher (D)

==== Georgia ====
▌2. Walter F. George (D)
▌3. Richard B. Russell Jr. (D)

==== Idaho ====
▌2. William E. Borah (R)
▌3. James P. Pope (D)

==== Illinois ====
▌2. James Hamilton Lewis (D)
▌3. William H. Dieterich (D)

==== Indiana ====
▌1. Arthur R. Robinson (R)
▌3. Frederick Van Nuys (D)

==== Iowa ====
▌2. Lester J. Dickinson (R)
▌3. Richard L. Murphy (D)

==== Kansas ====
▌2. Arthur Capper (R)
▌3. George McGill (D)

==== Kentucky ====
▌2. Marvel M. Logan (D)
▌3. Alben W. Barkley (D)

==== Louisiana ====
▌2. Huey P. Long (D)
▌3. John H. Overton (D)

==== Maine ====
▌1. Frederick Hale (R)
▌2. Wallace H. White Jr. (R)

==== Maryland ====
▌1. Phillips Lee Goldsborough (R)
▌3. Millard Tydings (D)

==== Massachusetts ====
▌1. David I. Walsh (D)
▌2. Marcus A. Coolidge (D)

==== Michigan ====
▌1. Arthur H. Vandenberg (R)
▌2. James J. Couzens (R)

==== Minnesota ====
▌1. Henrik Shipstead (FL)
▌2. Thomas D. Schall (R)

==== Mississippi ====
▌1. Hubert D. Stephens (D)
▌2. Pat Harrison (D)

==== Missouri ====
▌1. Roscoe C. Patterson (R)
▌3. Bennett Champ Clark (D)

==== Montana ====
▌1. Burton K. Wheeler (D)
▌2. John E. Erickson (D), March 13, 1933 – November 7, 1934

▌James E. Murray (D), from November 7, 1934

==== Nebraska ====
▌1. Robert B. Howell (R), until March 11, 1933

▌William H. Thompson (D), May 24, 1933 – November 7, 1934
▌Richard C. Hunter (D), from November 7, 1934

▌2. George W. Norris (R)

==== Nevada ====
▌1. Key Pittman (D)
▌3. Patrick A. McCarran (D)

==== New Hampshire ====
▌2. Henry W. Keyes (R)
▌3. Fred H. Brown (D)

==== New Jersey ====
▌1. Hamilton Fish Kean (R)
▌2. William Warren Barbour (R)

==== New Mexico ====
▌1. Bronson M. Cutting (R)
▌2. Sam G. Bratton (D), until June 24, 1933

▌Carl Hatch (D), from October 10, 1933

==== New York ====
▌1. Royal S. Copeland (D)
▌3. Robert F. Wagner (D)

==== North Carolina ====
▌2. Josiah William Bailey (D)
▌3. Robert R. Reynolds (D)

==== North Dakota ====
▌1. Lynn Frazier (R-NPL)
▌3. Gerald Nye (R)

==== Ohio ====
▌1. Simeon D. Fess (R)
▌3. Robert J. Bulkley (D)

==== Oklahoma ====
▌2. Thomas P. Gore (D)
▌3. Elmer Thomas (D)

==== Oregon ====
▌2. Charles L. McNary (R)
▌3. Frederick Steiwer (R)

==== Pennsylvania ====
▌1. David A. Reed (R)
▌3. James J. Davis (R)

==== Rhode Island ====
▌1. Felix Hebert (R)
▌2. Jesse H. Metcalf (R)

==== South Carolina ====
▌2. James F. Byrnes (D)
▌3. Ellison D. Smith (D)

==== South Dakota ====
▌2. William J. Bulow (D)
▌3. Peter Norbeck (R)

==== Tennessee ====
▌1. Kenneth D. McKellar (D)
▌2. Nathan L. Bachman (D)

==== Texas ====
▌1. Thomas T. Connally (D)
▌2. Morris Sheppard (D)

==== Utah ====
▌1. William H. King (D)
▌3. Elbert D. Thomas (D)

==== Vermont ====
▌1. Warren Austin (R)
▌3. Porter H. Dale (R), until October 6, 1933

▌Ernest Willard Gibson (R), from November 21, 1933

==== Virginia ====
▌1. Harry F. Byrd (D)
▌2. Carter Glass (D)

==== Washington ====
▌1. Clarence Cleveland Dill (D)
▌3. Homer Bone (D)

==== West Virginia ====
▌1. Henry D. Hatfield (R)
▌2. Matthew M. Neely (D)

==== Wisconsin ====
▌1. Robert M. La Follette Jr. (R)
▌3. F. Ryan Duffy (D)

==== Wyoming ====
▌1. John B. Kendrick (D), until November 3, 1933

▌Joseph C. O'Mahoney (D), from January 1, 1934

▌2. Robert D. Carey (R)

Senators' party membership by state at the opening of the 73rd Congress in March 1933. The green stripes denote Farmer-Labor Senator Henrik Shipstead. 2 Democrats 1 Democrat and 1 Republican 2 Republicans

=== House of Representatives ===
The names of representatives are preceded by their district numbers.

==== Alabama ====
▌1. John McDuffie (D)
▌2. J. Lister Hill (D)
▌3. Henry B. Steagall (D)
▌4. Lamar Jeffers (D)
▌5. Miles C. Allgood (D)
▌6. William B. Oliver (D)
▌7. William B. Bankhead (D)
▌8. Edward B. Almon (D), until June 22, 1933

▌Archibald Hill Carmichael (D), from November 14, 1933

▌9. George Huddleston (D)

==== Arizona ====
▌At-large. Isabella Selmes Greenway (D), from October 3, 1933

==== Arkansas ====
▌1. William J. Driver (D)
▌2. John E. Miller (D)
▌3. Claude A. Fuller (D)
▌4. William B. Cravens (D)
▌5. Heartsill Ragon (D), until June 16, 1933

▌David D. Terry (D), from December 19, 1933

▌6. David D. Glover (D)
▌7. Tilman B. Parks (D)

==== California ====
▌1. Clarence F. Lea (D)
▌2. Harry L. Englebright (R)
▌3. Frank H. Buck (D)
▌4. Florence P. Kahn (R)
▌5. Richard J. Welch (R)
▌6. Albert E. Carter (R)
▌7. Ralph R. Eltse (R)
▌8. John J. McGrath (D)
▌9. Denver S. Church (D)
▌10. Henry E. Stubbs (D)
▌11. William E. Evans (R)
▌12. John H. Hoeppel (D)
▌13. Charles Kramer (D)
▌14. Thomas F. Ford (D)
▌15. William I. Traeger (R)
▌16. John F. Dockweiler (D)
▌17. Charles J. Colden (D)
▌18. John H. Burke (D)
▌19. Sam L. Collins (R)
▌20. George Burnham (R)

==== Colorado ====
▌1. Lawrence Lewis (D)
▌2. Fred N. Cummings (D)
▌3. John A. Martin (D)
▌4. Edward T. Taylor (D)

==== Connecticut ====
▌1. Herman P. Kopplemann (D)
▌2. William L. Higgins (R)
▌3. Francis T. Maloney (D)
▌4. Schuyler Merritt (R)
▌5. Edward W. Goss (R)
▌At-large. Charles M. Bakewell (R)

==== Delaware ====
▌At-large. Wilbur L. Adams (D)

==== Florida ====
▌1. J. Hardin Peterson (D)
▌2. Robert A. Green (D)
▌3. Millard F. Caldwell (D)
▌4. J. Mark Wilcox (D)
▌At-large. William J. Sears (D)

==== Georgia ====
▌1. Homer C. Parker (D)
▌2. E. Eugene Cox (D)
▌3. Bryant T. Castellow (D)
▌4. Emmett M. Owen (D)
▌5. Robert Ramspeck (D)
▌6. Carl Vinson (D)
▌7. Malcolm C. Tarver (D)
▌8. Braswell Deen (D)
▌9. John S. Wood (D)
▌10. Charles H. Brand (D), until May 17, 1933

▌Paul Brown (D), from July 5, 1933

==== Idaho ====
▌1. Compton I. White (D)
▌2. Thomas C. Coffin (D), until June 8, 1934

==== Illinois ====
▌1. Oscar S. De Priest (R)
▌2. P. H. Moynihan (R)
▌3. Edward A. Kelly (D)
▌4. Harry P. Beam (D)
▌5. Adolph J. Sabath (D)
▌6. Thomas J. O’Brien (D)
▌7. Leonard W. Schuetz (D)
▌8. Leo Kocialkowski (D)
▌9. Frederick A. Britten (R)
▌10. James Simpson Jr. (R)
▌11. Frank R. Reid (R)
▌12. John T. Buckbee (R)
▌13. Leo E. Allen (R)
▌14. Chester C. Thompson (D)
▌15. J. Leroy Adair (D)
▌16. Everett M. Dirksen (R)
▌17. Frank Gillespie (D)
▌18. James A. Meeks (D)
▌19. Donald C. Dobbins (D)
▌20. Henry T. Rainey (D), until August 19, 1934
▌21. J. Earl Major (D), until October 6, 1933
▌22. Edwin M. Schaefer (D)
▌23. William W. Arnold (D)
▌24. Claude V. Parsons (D)
▌25. Kent E. Keller (D)
▌At-large. Martin A. Brennan (D)
▌At-large. Walter Nesbit (D)

==== Indiana ====
▌1. William T. Schulte (D)
▌2. George R. Durgan (D)
▌3. Samuel B. Pettengill (D)
▌4. James I. Farley (D)
▌5. Glenn Griswold (D)
▌6. Virginia E. Jenckes (D)
▌7. Arthur H. Greenwood (D)
▌8. John W. Boehne Jr. (D)
▌9. Eugene B. Crowe (D)
▌10. Finly H. Gray (D)
▌11. William H. Larrabee (D)
▌12. Louis Ludlow (D)

==== Iowa ====
▌1. Edward C. Eicher (D)
▌2. Bernhard M. Jacobsen (D)
▌3. Albert C. Willford (D)
▌4. Fred Biermann (D)
▌5. Lloyd Thurston (R)
▌6. Cassius C. Dowell (R)
▌7. Otha D. Wearin (D)
▌8. Fred C. Gilchrist (R)
▌9. Guy M. Gillette (D)

==== Kansas ====
▌1. William P. Lambertson (R)
▌2. Ulysses S. Guyer (R)
▌3. Harold C. McGugin (R)
▌4. Randolph Carpenter (D)
▌5. William A. Ayres (D), until August 22, 1934
▌6. Kathryn O'Loughlin McCarthy (D)
▌7. Clifford R. Hope (R)

==== Kentucky ====
▌At-large. John Y. Brown Sr. (D)
▌At-large. Cap R. Carden (D)
▌At-large. Glover H. Cary (D)
▌At-large. Virgil Chapman (D)
▌At-large. W. Voris Gregory (D)
▌At-large. Finley Hamilton (D)
▌At-large. Andrew J. May (D)
▌At-large. Brent Spence (D)
▌At-large. Fred M. Vinson (D)

==== Louisiana ====
▌1. Joachim O. Fernández (D)
▌2. Paul H. Maloney (D)
▌3. Numa F. Montet (D)
▌4. John N. Sandlin (D)
▌5. Riley Joseph Wilson (D)
▌6. Bolivar E. Kemp (D), until June 19, 1933

▌Jared Y. Sanders Jr. (D), from May 1, 1934

▌7. René L. DeRouen (D)
▌8. Cleveland Dear (D)

==== Maine ====
▌1. Carroll L. Beedy (R)
▌2. Edward C. Moran Jr. (D)
▌3. John G. Utterback (D)

==== Maryland ====
▌1. T. Alan Goldsborough (D)
▌2. William P. Cole Jr. (D)
▌3. Vincent L. Palmisano (D)
▌4. Ambrose J. Kennedy (D)
▌5. Stephen W. Gambrill (D)
▌6. David J. Lewis (D)

==== Massachusetts ====
▌1. Allen T. Treadway (R)
▌2. William J. Granfield (D)
▌3. Frank H. Foss (R)
▌4. Pehr G. Holmes (R)
▌5. Edith Nourse Rogers (R)
▌6. A. Piatt Andrew Jr. (R)
▌7. William P. Connery Jr. (D)
▌8. Arthur D. Healey (D)
▌9. Robert Luce (R)
▌10. George H. Tinkham (R)
▌11. John J. Douglass (D)
▌12. John W. McCormack (D)
▌13. Richard B. Wigglesworth (R)
▌14. Joseph W. Martin Jr. (R)
▌15. Charles L. Gifford (R)

==== Michigan ====
▌1. George G. Sadowski (D)
▌2. John C. Lehr (D)
▌3. Joseph L. Hooper (R), until February 22, 1934
▌4. George Ernest Foulkes (D)
▌5. Carl Mapes (R)
▌6. Claude E. Cady (D)
▌7. Jesse P. Wolcott (R)
▌8. Michael J. Hart (D)
▌9. Harry W. Musselwhite (D)
▌10. Roy O. Woodruff (R)
▌11. Prentiss M. Brown (D)
▌12. W. Frank James (R)
▌13. Clarence J. McLeod (R)
▌14. Carl M. Weideman (D)
▌15. John D. Dingell Sr. (D)
▌16. John Lesinski Sr. (D)
▌17. George A. Dondero (R)

==== Minnesota ====
▌At-large. Henry M. Arens (FL)
▌At-large. Ray P. Chase (R)
▌At-large. Theodore Christianson (R)
▌At-large. Einar Hoidale (D)
▌At-large. Magnus Johnson (FL)
▌At-large. Harold Knutson (R)
▌At-large. Paul J. Kvale (FL)
▌At-large. Ernest Lundeen (FL)
▌At-large. Francis Shoemaker (FL)

==== Mississippi ====
▌1. John E. Rankin (D)
▌2. Wall Doxey (D)
▌3. William M. Whittington (D)
▌4. T. Jefferson Busby (D)
▌5. Ross A. Collins (D)
▌6. William M. Colmer (D)
▌7. Lawrence R. Ellzey (D)

==== Missouri ====
▌At-large. Clarence Cannon (D)
▌At-large. James Robert Claiborne (D)
▌At-large. John J. Cochran (D)
▌At-large. Clement C. Dickinson (D)
▌At-large. Richard M. Duncan (D)
▌At-large. Frank H. Lee (D)
▌At-large. Ralph F. Lozier (D)
▌At-large. Jacob L. Milligan (D)
▌At-large. Milton A. Romjue (D)
▌At-large. James Edward Ruffin (D)
▌At-large. Joseph B. Shannon (D)
▌At-large. Clyde Williams (D)
▌At-large. Reuben T. Wood (D)

==== Montana ====
▌1. Joseph P. Monaghan (D)
▌2. Roy E. Ayers (D)

==== Nebraska ====
▌1. John H. Morehead (D)
▌2. Edward R. Burke (D)
▌3. Edgar Howard (D)
▌4. Ashton C. Shallenberger (D)
▌5. Terry Carpenter (D)

==== Nevada ====
▌At-large. James G. Scrugham (D)

==== New Hampshire ====
▌1. William N. Rogers (D)
▌2. Charles W. Tobey (R)

==== New Jersey ====
▌1. Charles A. Wolverton (R)
▌2. Isaac Bacharach (R)
▌3. William H. Sutphin (D)
▌4. D. Lane Powers (R)
▌5. Charles A. Eaton (R)
▌6. Donald H. McLean (R)
▌7. Randolph Perkins (R)
▌8. George N. Seger (R)
▌9. Edward A. Kenney (D)
▌10. Fred A. Hartley Jr. (R)
▌11. Peter A. Cavicchia (R)
▌12. Frederick R. Lehlbach (R)
▌13. Mary T. Norton (D)
▌14. Oscar L. Auf der Heide (D)

==== New Mexico ====
▌At-large. Dennis Chávez (D)

==== New York ====
▌1. Robert L. Bacon (R)
▌2. William F. Brunner (D)
▌3. George W. Lindsay (D)
▌4. Thomas H. Cullen (D)
▌5. Loring M. Black Jr. (D)
▌6. Andrew L. Somers (D)
▌7. John J. Delaney (D)
▌8. Patrick J. Carley (D)
▌9. Stephen A. Rudd (D)
▌10. Emanuel Celler (D)
▌11. Anning S. Prall (D)
▌12. Samuel Dickstein (D)
▌13. Christopher D. Sullivan (D)
▌14. William I. Sirovich (D)
▌15. John J. Boylan (D)
▌16. John J. O'Connor (D)
▌17. Theodore A. Peyser (D)
▌18. Martin J. Kennedy (D)
▌19. Sol Bloom (D)
▌20. James J. Lanzetta (D)
▌21. Joseph A. Gavagan (D)
▌22. Anthony J. Griffin (D)
▌23. Frank Oliver (D), until June 18, 1934
▌24. James M. Fitzpatrick (D)
▌25. Charles D. Millard (R)
▌26. Hamilton Fish III (R)
▌27. Philip A. Goodwin (R)
▌28. Parker Corning (D)
▌29. James S. Parker (R), until December 19, 1933

▌William D. Thomas (R), from January 30, 1934

▌30. Frank Crowther (R)
▌31. Bertrand H. Snell (R)
▌32. Francis D. Culkin (R)
▌33. Fred J. Sisson (D)
▌34. John D. Clarke (R), until November 5, 1933

▌Marian W. Clarke (R), from December 28, 1933

▌35. Clarence E. Hancock (R)
▌36. John Taber (R)
▌37. Gale H. Stalker (R)
▌38. James L. Whitley (R)
▌39. James W. Wadsworth Jr. (R)
▌40. Walter G. Andrews (R)
▌41. Alfred F. Beiter (D)
▌42. James M. Mead (D)
▌43. Daniel A. Reed (R)
▌At-large. John Fitzgibbons (D)
▌At-large. Elmer E. Studley (D)

==== North Carolina ====
▌1. Lindsay C. Warren (D)
▌2. John H. Kerr (D)
▌3. Charles L. Abernethy (D)
▌4. Edward W. Pou (D), until April 1, 1934

▌Harold D. Cooley (D), from July 7, 1934

▌5. Franklin W. Hancock Jr. (D)
▌6. William B. Umstead (D)
▌7. J. Bayard Clark (D)
▌8. J. Walter Lambeth (D)
▌9. Robert L. Doughton (D)
▌10. Alfred L. Bulwinkle (D)
▌11. Zebulon Weaver (D)

==== North Dakota ====
▌At-large. William Lemke (R-NPL)
▌At-large. James H. Sinclair (R)

==== Ohio ====
▌1. John B. Hollister (R)
▌2. William E. Hess (R)
▌3. Byron B. Harlan (D)
▌4. Frank Le Blond Kloeb (D)
▌5. Frank C. Kniffin (D)
▌6. James G. Polk (D)
▌7. Leroy T. Marshall (R)
▌8. Thomas B. Fletcher (D)
▌9. Warren J. Duffey (D)
▌10. Thomas A. Jenkins (R)
▌11. Mell G. Underwood (D)
▌12. Arthur P. Lamneck (D)
▌13. William L. Fiesinger (D)
▌14. Dow W. Harter (D)
▌15. Robert T. Secrest (D)
▌16. William R. Thom (D)
▌17. Charles F. West (D)
▌18. Lawrence E. Imhoff (D)
▌19. John G. Cooper (R)
▌20. Martin L. Sweeney (D)
▌21. Robert Crosser (D)
▌22. Chester C. Bolton (R)
▌At-large. Charles V. Truax (D)
▌At-large. Stephen M. Young (D)

==== Oklahoma ====
▌1. Wesley E. Disney (D)
▌2. William W. Hastings (D)
▌3. Wilburn Cartwright (D)
▌4. Tom D. McKeown (D)
▌5. Fletcher B. Swank (D)
▌6. Jed J. Johnson (D)
▌7. James V. McClintic (D)
▌8. Ernest W. Marland (D)
▌At-large. Will Rogers (D)

==== Oregon ====
▌1. James W. Mott (R)
▌2. Walter M. Pierce (D)
▌3. Charles H. Martin (D)

==== Pennsylvania ====
▌1. Harry C. Ransley (R)
▌2. James M. Beck (R), until September 30, 1934
▌3. Alfred Marpole Waldron (R)
▌4. George W. Edmonds (R)
▌5. James J. Connolly (R)
▌6. Edward L. Stokes (R)
▌7. George P. Darrow (R)
▌8. James Wolfenden (R)
▌9. Henry Winfield Watson (R), until August 27, 1933

▌Oliver Walter Frey (D), from November 7, 1933

▌10. J. Roland Kinzer (R)
▌11. Patrick J. Boland (D)
▌12. C. Murray Turpin (R)
▌13. George F. Brumm (R), until May 29, 1934
▌14. William Emanuel Richardson (D)
▌15. Louis T. McFadden (R)
▌16. Robert F. Rich (R)
▌17. J. William Ditter (R)
▌18. Benjamin K. Focht (R)
▌19. Isaac H. Doutrich (R)
▌20. Thomas C. Cochran (R)
▌21. Francis E. Walter (D)
▌22. Harry L. Haines (D)
▌23. J. Banks Kurtz (R)
▌24. J. Buell Snyder (D)
▌25. Charles I. Faddis (D)
▌26. J. Howard Swick (R)
▌27. Nathan L. Strong (R)
▌28. William M. Berlin (D)
▌29. Charles N. Crosby (D)
▌30. J. Twing Brooks (D)
▌31. M. Clyde Kelly (R)
▌32. Michael Joseph Muldowney (R)
▌33. Henry Ellenbogen (D)
▌34. Matthew A. Dunn (D)

==== Rhode Island ====
▌1. Francis B. Condon (D)
▌2. John M. O'Connell (D)

==== South Carolina ====
▌1. Thomas S. McMillan (D)
▌2. Hampton P. Fulmer (D)
▌3. John C. Taylor (D)
▌4. John J. McSwain (D)
▌5. James P. Richards (D)
▌6. Allard H. Gasque (D)

==== South Dakota ====
▌1. Fred H. Hildebrandt (D)
▌2. Theodore B. Werner (D)

==== Tennessee ====
▌1. B. Carroll Reece (R)
▌2. J. Will Taylor (R)
▌3. Samuel D. McReynolds (D)
▌4. John Ridley Mitchell (D)
▌5. Joseph W. Byrns (D)
▌6. Clarence W. Turner (D)
▌7. Gordon Browning (D)
▌8. Jere Cooper (D)
▌9. Edward H. Crump (D)

==== Texas ====
▌1. Wright Patman (D)
▌2. Martin Dies Jr. (D)
▌3. Morgan G. Sanders (D)
▌4. Sam Rayburn (D)
▌5. Hatton W. Sumners (D)
▌6. Luther Alexander Johnson (D)
▌7. Clay Stone Briggs (D), until April 29, 1933

▌Clark W. Thompson (D), from June 24, 1933

▌8. Joe H. Eagle (D)
▌9. Joseph J. Mansfield (D)
▌10. James P. Buchanan (D)
▌11. Oliver H. Cross (D)
▌12. Fritz G. Lanham (D)
▌13. William D. McFarlane (D)
▌14. Richard M. Kleberg (D)
▌15. Milton H. West (D), from April 22, 1933
▌16. R. Ewing Thomason (D)
▌17. Thomas L. Blanton (D)
▌18. John Marvin Jones (D)
▌At-large. Joseph Weldon Bailey Jr. (D)
▌At-large. Sterling Price Strong (D)
▌At-large. George Butler Terrell (D)

==== Utah ====
▌1. Abe Murdock (D)
▌2. J. W. Robinson (D)

==== Vermont ====
▌At-large. Ernest Willard Gibson (R), until October 19, 1933

▌Charles A. Plumley (R), from January 16, 1934

==== Virginia ====
▌At-large. S. Otis Bland (D)
▌At-large. Thomas G. Burch (D)
▌At-large. Colgate W. Darden Jr. (D)
▌At-large. Patrick H. Drewry (D)
▌At-large. John W. Flannagan Jr. (D)
▌At-large. Andrew Jackson Montague (D)
▌At-large. A. Willis Robertson (D)
▌At-large. Howard W. Smith (D)
▌At-large. Clifton A. Woodrum (D)

==== Washington ====
▌1. Marion Anthony Zioncheck (D)
▌2. Monrad C. Wallgren (D)
▌3. Martin F. Smith (D)
▌4. Knute Hill (D)
▌5. Samuel B. Hill (D)
▌6. Wesley Lloyd (D)

==== West Virginia ====
▌1. Robert L. Ramsay (D)
▌2. Jennings Randolph (D)
▌3. Lynn Hornor (D), until September 23, 1933

▌Andrew Edmiston Jr. (D), from November 28, 1933

▌4. George W. Johnson (D)
▌5. John Kee (D)
▌6. Joe L. Smith (D)

==== Wisconsin ====
▌1. George Washington Blanchard (R)
▌2. Charles W. Henney (D)
▌3. Gardner R. Withrow (R)
▌4. Raymond Joseph Cannon (D)
▌5. Thomas David Patrick O'Malley (D)
▌6. Michael K. Reilly (D)
▌7. Gerald J. Boileau (R)
▌8. James Frederic Hughes (D)
▌9. James A. Frear (R)
▌10. Hubert H. Peavey (R)

==== Wyoming ====
▌At-large. Vincent Carter (R)

==== Non-voting members ====
▌Alaska Territory. Anthony J. Dimond (D)
▌Hawaii Territory. Lincoln L. McCandless (D)
▌Philippines: Pedro Guevara (Nac.)
▌Philippines: Camilo Osías (Nac.)
▌Puerto Rico: Santiago Iglesias (Coalitionist)

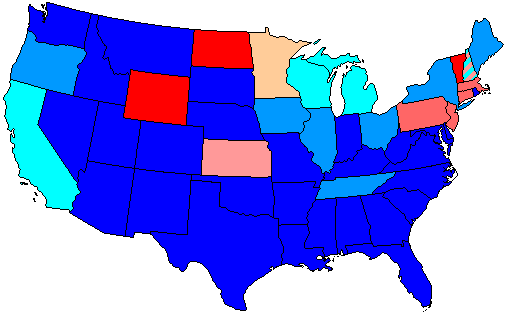
House seats by party holding plurality in state: 80+% Democratic / 80+% Republican; 60+% to 80% Democratic / 60+% to 80% Republican; Up to 60% Democratic / Up to 60% Republican

== Changes in membership ==
=== Senate ===
Senate changes
State (class)	Vacated by	Reason for change	Successor	Date of successor's formal installation (Note: When seated or oath administered, not necessarily when service began.)
Montana (2)	Vacant	Thomas J. Walsh (D) died in office. Successor appointed March 13, 1933, to continue the term. Successor later lost nomination to finish the term, see below.	John Erickson (D)	March 13, 1933
Nebraska (1)	Robert Howell (R)	Died March 11, 1933. Successor appointed May 24, 1933, to continue the term. Successor later retired, see below.	William H. Thompson (D)	May 24, 1933
New Mexico (2)	Sam Bratton (D)	Resigned June 24, 1933, when appointed Judge of the U.S. Court of Appeals. Successor appointed October 10, 1933, and then elected November 6, 1934.	Carl Hatch (D)	October 10, 1933
Vermont (3)	Porter Dale (R)	Died October 6, 1933. Successor appointed November 21, 1933, and then elected January 17, 1934.	Ernest Gibson (R)	November 21, 1933
Wyoming (1)	John Kendrick (D)	Died November 3, 1933. Successor appointed December 18, 1933, to finish the term.	Joseph C. O'Mahoney (D)	January 1, 1934
Nebraska (1)	William Thompson (D)	Interim appointee did not run in the special election to finish the term. Successor elected November 6, 1934.	Richard Hunter (D)	November 7, 1934
Montana (2)	John Erickson (D)	Interim appointee lost nomination to finish the term. Successor elected November 6, 1934.	James E. Murray (D)	November 7, 1934

=== House of Representatives ===
House changes
District	Vacated by	Reason for change	Successor	Date of successor's formal installation
Texas 15th	Vacant	John Garner had resigned at the end of the previous Congress	Milton H. West	April 22, 1933
Arizona at-large	Vacant	Lewis W. Douglas (D) had resigned at the end of the previous Congress	Isabella Greenway (D)	October 3, 1933
Texas 7th	Clay Stone Briggs (D)	Died April 29, 1933	Clark W. Thompson (D)	June 24, 1933
Arkansas 5th	Heartsill Ragon (D)	Resigned May 12, 1933, upon appointment as a judge of the United States District Court for the Western District of Arkansas	David D. Terry (D)	December 19, 1933
Georgia 10th	Charles H. Brand (D)	Died May 17, 1933	Paul Brown (D)	July 5, 1933
Louisiana 6th	Bolivar E. Kemp (D)	Died June 19, 1933	Jared Y. Sanders Jr. (D)	May 1, 1934
Alabama 8th	Edward B. Almon (D)	Died June 22, 1933	Archibald Hill Carmichael (D)	November 14, 1933
Pennsylvania 9th	Henry Winfield Watson (R)	Died August 27, 1933	Oliver Walter Frey (D)	November 7, 1933
West Virginia 3rd	Lynn Hornor (D)	Died September 23, 1933	Andrew Edmiston Jr. (D)	November 28, 1933
Illinois 21st	J. Earl Major (D)	appointed as a judge of the United States District Court for the Southern District of Illinois October 6, 1933	Seat remained vacant until next Congress	
Vermont at-large	Ernest W. Gibson (R)	Appointed U.S. Senator November 21, 1933	Charles A. Plumley (R)	January 16, 1934
New York 34th	John D. Clarke (R)	Died November 5, 1933	Marian W. Clarke (R)	December 28, 1933
New York 29th	James S. Parker (R)	Died December 19, 1933	William D. Thomas (R)	January 30, 1934
Michigan 3rd	Joseph L. Hooper (R)	Died February 22, 1934	Seat remained vacant until next Congress	
North Carolina 4th	Edward W. Pou (D)	Died April 1, 1934	Harold D. Cooley (D)	July 7, 1934
Pennsylvania 13th	George F. Brumm (R)	Died May 29, 1934	Seat remained vacant until next Congress	
Idaho 2nd	Thomas C. Coffin (D)	Died June 8, 1934	Seat remained vacant until next Congress	
New York 23rd	Frank Oliver (D)	Resigned June 18, 1934	Seat remained vacant until next Congress	
Illinois 20th	Henry T. Rainey (D)	Died August 19, 1934	Seat remained vacant until next Congress	
Kansas 5th	William A. Ayres (D)	Resigned August 22, 1934, after being appointed a member of the Federal Trade Commission	Seat remained vacant until next Congress	
Pennsylvania 2nd	James M. Beck (R)	Resigned September 30, 1934	Seat remained vacant until next Congress	

== Committees ==
=== Senate ===
- Agriculture and Forestry (Chairman: Ellison D. Smith; Ranking Member: George W. Norris)
- Air Mail and Ocean Mail Contracts (Special)
- Alaska Railroad (Special Select)
- Appropriations (Chairman: Carter Glass; Ranking Member: Frederick Hale)
- Audit and Control the Contingent Expenses of the Senate (Chairman: James F. Byrnes; Ranking Member: John G. Townsend Jr.)
- Banking and Currency (Chairman: Duncan U. Fletcher; Ranking Member: Peter Norbeck)
- Bankruptcy and Receiveship (Select)
- Campaign Expenditures (Select)
- Civil Service (Chairman: William J. Bulow; Ranking Member: Porter H. Dale)
- Claims (Chairman: Josiah W. Bailey; Ranking Member: Arthur Capper)
- Commerce (Chairman: Hubert D. Stephens; Ranking Member: Charles L. McNary)
- District of Columbia (Chairman: William H. King; Ranking Member: Arthur Capper)
- Education and Labor (Chairman: David I. Walsh; Ranking Member: William E. Borah)
- Enrolled Bills (Chairman: Hattie W. Caraway; Ranking Member: Arthur H. Vandenberg)
- Expenditures in Executive Departments (Chairman: J. Hamilton Lewis; Ranking Member: Daniel O. Hastings)
- Finance (Chairman: Pat Harrison; Ranking Member: David A. Reed)
- Foreign Relations (Chairman: Key Pittman; Ranking Member: William E. Borah)
- Immigration (Chairman: Marcus A. Coolidge; Ranking Member: Hiram W. Johnson)
- Indian Affairs (Chairman: Burton K. Wheeler; Ranking Member: Lynn J. Frazier)
- Interoceanic Canals (Chairman: Thomas P. Gore; Ranking Member: Thomas D. Schall)
- Interstate Commerce (Chairman: Clarence C. Dill; Ranking Member: James Couzens)
- Irrigation and Reclamation (Chairman: Alva B. Adams; Ranking Member: Charles L. McNary)
- Judiciary (Chairman: Henry F. Ashurst; Ranking Member: William E. Borah)
- Library (Chairman: Alben W. Barkley; Ranking Member: Simeon D. Fess)
- Manufactures (Chairman: Robert J. Bulkley; Ranking Member: Charles L. McNary)
- Military Affairs (Chairman: Morris Sheppard; Ranking Member: David A. Reed)
- Mines and Mining (Chairman: M.M. Logan; Ranking Member: Arthur B. Robinson)
- Mississippi Flood Control Project (Select) (Chairman: Robert F. Wagner)
- Munitions Industry (Select) (Chairman: Gerald P. Nye)
- Naval Affairs (Chairman: Park Trammell; Ranking Member: Frederick Hale)
- Patents (Chairman: William G. McAdoo; Ranking Member: George W. Norris)
- Pensions (Chairman: George McGill; Ranking Member: Thomas D. Schall)
- Philippines Economic Condition (Special)
- Post Office and Post Roads (Chairman: Kenneth McKellar; Ranking Member: Porter H. Dale)
- Presidential and Senatorial Campaign Expenditures (Special) (Chairman: Tom Connally)
- Printing (Chairman: Carl Hayden; Ranking Member: Arthur H. Vandenberg)
- Privileges and Elections (Chairman: Walter F. George; Ranking Member: Daniel O. Hastings)
- Public Buildings and Grounds (Chairman: Tom Connally; Ranking Member: Henry W. Keyes)
- Public Lands and Surveys (Chairman: Robert F. Wagner; Ranking Member: Peter Norbeck)
- Rules (Chairman: Royal S. Copeland; Ranking Member: Frederick Hale)
- Territories and Insular Affairs (Chairman: Millard E. Tydings; Ranking Member: Hiram W. Johnson)
- Whole
- Wildlife Resources (Special) (Chairman: Frederic C. Walcott)

=== House of Representatives ===
- Accounts (Chairman: Lindsay C. Warren; Ranking Member: James Wolfenden)
- Agriculture (Chairman: J. Marvin Jones; Ranking Member: John D. Clarke)
- Appropriations (Chairman: James P. Buchanan; Ranking Member: John Taber)
- Banking and Currency (Chairman: Henry B. Steagall; Ranking Member: Robert Luce)
- Census (Chairman: Ralph F. Lozier; Ranking Member: J. Roland Kinzer)
- Civil Service (Chairman: Lamar Jeffers; Ranking Member: Frederick R. Lehlbach)
- Claims (Chairman: Loring M. Black Jr.; Ranking Member: Ulysses S. Guyer)
- Coinage, Weights and Measures (Chairman: Andrew L. Somers; Ranking Member: Randolph Perkins)
- Conservation of Wildlife Resources (Select) (Chairman: A. Willis Robertson)
- Disposition of Executive Papers (Chairman: Robert A. Green; Ranking Member: N/A)
- District of Columbia (Chairman: Mary T. Norton; Ranking Member: Gale Stalker)
- Education (Chairman: John J. Douglass; Ranking Member: James L. Whitley)
- Election of the President, Vice President and Representatives in Congress (Chairman: Patrick J. Carley; Ranking Member: Charles L. Gifford)
- Elections No.#1 (Chairman: J. Bayard Clark; Ranking Member: John B. Hollister)
- Elections No.#2 (Chairman: Joseph A. Gavagan; Ranking Member: Joseph L. Hooper)
- Elections No.#3 (Chairman: John H. Kerr; Ranking Member: Charles L. Gifford)
- Enrolled Bills (Chairman: Claude V. Parsons; Ranking Member: Oscar Stanton De Priest)
- Expenditures in the Executive Departments (Chairman: John J. Cochran; Ranking Member: Charles L. Gifford)
- Flood Control (Chairman: Riley J. Wilson; Ranking Member: Frank R. Reid)
- Foreign Affairs (Chairman: Sam D. McReynolds; Ranking Member: Hamilton Fish III)
- Immigration and Naturalization (Chairman: Samuel Dickstein; Ranking Member: J. Will Taylor)
- Indian Affairs (Chairman: Edgar Howard; Ranking Member: Hubert H. Peavey)
- Insular Affairs (Chairman: John McDuffie; Ranking Member: Carroll L. Beedy)
- Interstate and Foreign Commerce (Chairman: Sam Rayburn; Ranking Member: James S. Parker then John G. Cooper)
- Invalid Pensions (Chairman: Mell G. Underwood; Ranking Member: Oscar Stanton De Priest)
- Investigate Real Estate Beholder's Reorganizations (Select) (Chairman: N/A)
- Irrigation and Reclamation (Chairman: Dennis Chavez; Ranking Member: Vincent Carter)
- Judiciary (Chairman: Hatton W. Sumners; Ranking Member: J. Banks Kurtz)
- Labor (Chairman: William P. Connery Jr.; Ranking Member: Richard J. Welch)
- Library (Chairman: Kent E. Keller; Ranking Member: Robert Luce)
- Memorials (Chairman: John H. Morehead; Ranking Member: Frank Crowther)
- Merchant Marine, Radio and Fisheries (Chairman: S. Otis Bland; Ranking Member: Frederick R. Lehlbach)
- Military Affairs (Chairman: John J. McSwain; Ranking Member: W. Frank James)
- Mines and Mining (Chairman: Joe L. Smith; Ranking Member: Harry Lane Englebright)
- Naval Affairs (Chairman: Carl Vinson; Ranking Member: Frederick A. Britten)
- Patents (Chairman: William I. Sirovich; Ranking Member: Randolph Perkins)
- Pensions (Chairman: Allard H. Gasque; Ranking Member: Gale Stalker)
- Post Office and Post Roads (Chairman: James M. Mead; Ranking Member: Clyde Kelly)
- Printing (Chairman: J. Walter Lambeth; Ranking Member: Robert F. Rich)
- Public Buildings and Grounds (Chairman: Fritz G. Lanham; Ranking Member: J. Will Taylor)
- Public Lands (Chairman: Rene L. DeRouen; Ranking Member: Harry Lane Englebright)
- Revision of Laws (Chairman: Byron B. Harlan; Ranking Member: Frank R. Reid)
- Rivers and Harbors (Chairman: Joseph J. Mansfield; Ranking Member: Nathan L. Strong)
- Roads (Chairman: Wilburn Cartwright; Ranking Member: C. Murray Turpin)
- Rules (Chairman: William B. Bankhead; Ranking Member: Harry C. Ransley)
- Standards of Official Conduct
- Territories (Chairman: Robert A. Green; Ranking Member: Ernest W. Gibson)
- War Claims (Chairman: Miles C. Allgood; Ranking Member: James H. Sinclair)
- Ways and Means (Chairman: Robert L. Doughton; Ranking Member: Allen T. Treadway)
- World War Veterans' Legislation (Chairman: John E. Rankin; Ranking Member: Robert Luce)
- Whole

=== Joint committees ===
- Conditions of Indian Tribes (Special)
- Disposition of (Useless) Executive Papers
- Investigate Dirigible Disasters (Chairman: Sen. William H. King; Vice Chairman: Rep. )
- Printing (Chairman: Sen. Duncan U. Fletcher; Vice Chairman: Rep. J. Walter Lambeth)
- The Library (Chairman: Sen. Alben W. Barkley)
- Taxation (Chairman: Sen. Pat Harrison)

== Caucuses ==
- Democratic (House)
- Democratic (Senate)

== Employees ==
=== Legislative branch agency directors ===
- Architect of the Capitol: David Lynn
- Attending Physician of the United States Congress: George Calver
- Comptroller General of the United States: John R. McCarl
- Librarian of Congress: Herbert Putnam
- Public Printer of the United States: George H. Carter, until 1934
  - Augustus E. Giegengack, from 1934

=== Senate ===
- Secretary: Edwin A. Halsey
- Librarian: James D. Preston
- Chaplain: ZeBarney Thorne Phillips (Episcopalian)
- Sergeant at Arms: Chesley W. Jurney
- Democratic Party Secretary: Leslie Biffle
- Republican Party Secretary: Carl A. Loeffler

=== House of Representatives ===
Employees include: (Note: Rules of the House: "Other officers and officials")

- Clerk: South Trimble
- Chaplain: James Shera Montgomery (Methodist)
- Parliamentarian: Lewis Deschler
- Reading Clerks: Patrick Joseph Haltigan (D) and Alney E. Chaffee (R)
- Sergeant at Arms: Kenneth Romney
- Doorkeeper: Joseph J. Sinnott

== See also ==
- 1932 United States elections (elections leading to this Congress)
  - 1932 United States presidential election
  - 1932 United States Senate elections
  - 1932 United States House of Representatives elections
- 1934 United States elections (elections during this Congress, leading to the next Congress)
  - 1934 United States Senate elections
  - 1934 United States House of Representatives elections
