= Finley Hamilton =

American politician (1886–1940)

Member of the U.S. House of Representatives from Kentucky's at-large district
- In office March 4, 1933 – March 3, 1935
- Preceded by: Seat created
- Succeeded by: Seat eliminated

Personal details
- Born: June 19, 1886 Vincent, Kentucky, U.S.
- Died: January 10, 1940 (aged 53) London, Kentucky, U.S.
- Resting place: Pine Grove Cemetery
- Party: Democratic
- Education: Berea College
- Occupation: Politician

Military service
- Allegiance: United States
- Branch/service: United States Army
- Battles/wars: World War II

Finley Hamilton (June 19, 1886 – January 10, 1940) was a United States representative from Kentucky. He was born in Vincent, Owsley County, Kentucky. He attended the public schools and Berea College. He studied law and was admitted to the bar in 1915 and commenced practice in London, Kentucky.

Hamilton enlisted in the United States Army and served in the Signal Corps, with service in the Philippine Islands and Alaska, from 1907 to 1915. During the First World War, he reenlisted on March 18, 1916, and served in Company D, Three Hundred and Fifteenth Field Signal Battalion, Ninetieth Division, with service in France.

Hamilton was elected as a Democrat to the Seventy-third Congress (March 4, 1933 – January 3, 1935) to an at-large seat that was elected statewide on a general ticket, but was not a candidate for renomination in 1934. He resumed the practice of law and died in London, Kentucky in 1940. He was buried in Pine Grove Cemetery.

U.S. House of Representatives
Preceded by Seat created	Member of the U.S. House of Representatives from Kentucky's at-large congressional district 1933–1935	Succeeded by Seat eliminated
