= Edward W. Goss =

American politician (1893–1972)

Edward Goss

Member of the U.S. House of Representatives from Connecticut's 5th district
- In office November 4, 1930 – January 3, 1935
- Preceded by: James P. Glynn
- Succeeded by: J. Joseph Smith

Member of the Connecticut Senate
- In office 1926–1928

Personal details
- Born: April 27, 1893 Waterbury, Connecticut, U.S.
- Died: December 27, 1972 (aged 79) Miami, Florida, U.S
- Party: Republican

Military service
- Allegiance: United States of America
- Branch/service: United States Coast Guard Reserve
- Years of service: 1942–1948
- Rank: Lieutenant
- Battles/wars: World War II

Edward Wheeler Goss (April 27, 1893 – December 27, 1972) was a U.S. representative from Connecticut.

Born in Waterbury, Connecticut, Goss attended the public schools and was graduated from Hill School, Pottstown, Pennsylvania. He entered the military service September 6, 1918, was assigned to the Fortieth Company, Tenth Battalion, One Hundred and Sixty-sixth Depot Brigade, and served until his discharge as a sergeant on December 4, 1918. He engaged in the manufacture of brass from 1912 to 1930, serving as delegate to the Republican National Conventions in 1924, 1928, and 1932, and in the Connecticut State Senate from 1926 to 1928.

Goss was elected as a Republican to the Seventy-first Congress to fill the vacancy caused by the death of James P. Glynn and at the same time was elected to the Seventy-second Congress. He was re-elected to the Seventy-third Congress and served from November 4, 1930, to January 3, 1935. He was unsuccessful for reelection in 1934 to the Seventy-fourth Congress.

He engaged in statistical and research work in Washington, D.C. from 1935 to 1939. During World War II, he enlisted in the United States Coast Guard Reserve, on May 25, 1942, as chief bosun mate, was promoted to lieutenant and served until discharged February 15, 1948. He was then a distributor for Investors Diversified Services, Inc., of Minneapolis, Minnesota from 1948 to 1951.

Goss died in Miami, Florida, on December 27, 1972, and was cremated. His ashes were interred in Riverside Cemetery, Waterbury, Connecticut.

U.S. House of Representatives
Preceded by James P. Glynn	Member of the U.S. House of Representatives from Connecticut's 5th congressional district November 4, 1930 – January 3, 1935	Succeeded by J. Joseph Smith
