= Glover H. Cary =

American politician (1885–1936)

Glover H Cary
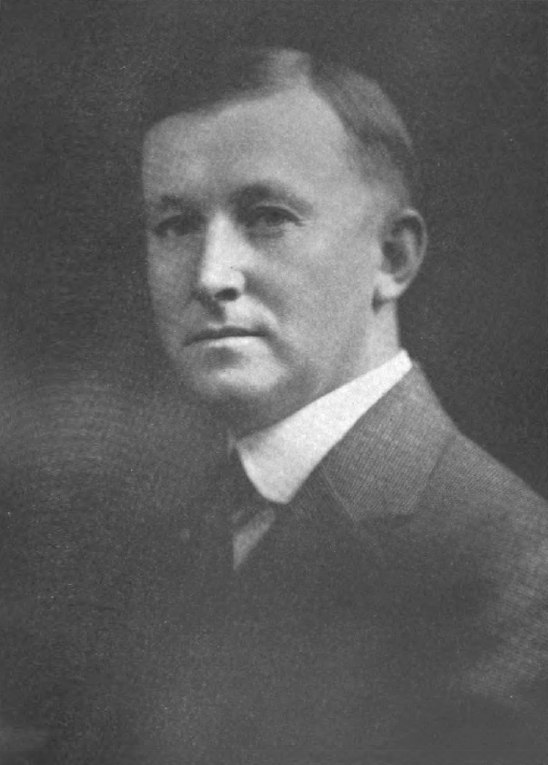
- Portrait of Glover H. Cary

Member of the U.S. House of Representatives from Kentucky's 2nd district
- In office March 4, 1931 – December 5, 1936
- Preceded by: John Lloyd Dorsey, Jr.
- Succeeded by: Beverly M. Vincent

Member of the Kentucky House of Representatives from the 17th district
- In office January 1, 1914 – January 1, 1918
- Preceded by: Fountain A. Lochry
- Succeeded by: Oscar V. Brown

Personal details
- Born: May 1, 1885 Calhoun, Kentucky, U.S.
- Died: December 5, 1936 (aged 51) Cincinnati, Ohio, U.S.
- Resting place: Calhoun Cemetery
- Party: Democratic
- Spouse: Bessie W. Miller
- Education: Centre College
- Profession: Lawyer
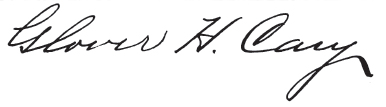
- Signature

Glover H. Cary (May 1, 1885 – December 5, 1936) was a member of the United States House of Representatives from Kentucky.

He was born in Calhoun, McLean County, Kentucky in 1885. He attended public and private schools and Centre College in Danville, Kentucky. He was employed as a deputy clerk, bank cashier, and newspaper editor. Cary studied law, was admitted to the bar in June 1909 and commenced practice in Calhoun, Kentucky. He was a member of the Kentucky General Assembly from 1914 to 1917 and prosecuting attorney for McLean County from 1918 to 1922. He served as the Commonwealth's Attorney for the sixth judicial district from 1922 until his resignation on February 28, 1931, having been elected to Congress. Cary moved to Owensboro, Kentucky in 1926. He was elected as a Democrat to the Seventy-second, Seventy-third and Seventy-fourth Congresses and served from March 4, 1931, until his death. He had been reelected to the Seventy-fifth Congress and was a delegate to the Democratic National Convention in 1932.

Cary married Bessie W. Miller on April 4, 1906. They had five children: William, Sara, Helen, Elizabeth, and Glover. He died in Cincinnati, Ohio, on December 5, 1936, and was interred in Calhoun Cemetery in Calhoun, Kentucky.

In 1940, the new Owensboro Bridge in Owensboro, Kentucky was dedicated to his memory.

== See also ==
- List of members of the United States Congress who died in office (1900–1949)

U.S. House of Representatives
Preceded by John L. Dorsey, Jr.	Member of the U.S. House of Representatives from Kentucky's 2nd congressional district 1931 – 1936	Succeeded by Beverly M. Vincent
