= W. Voris Gregory =

American politician (1877–1936)

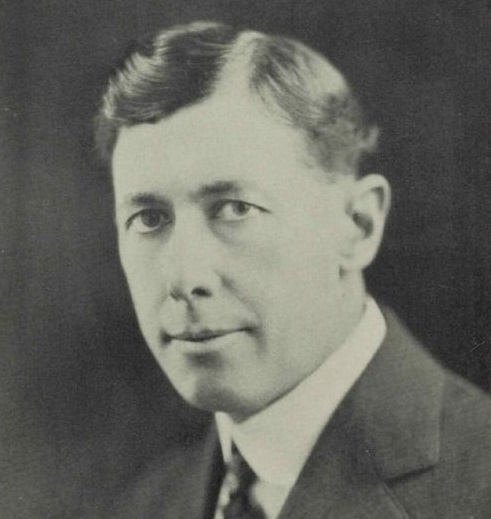
William Voris Gregory, Kentucky Congressman.

William Voris Gregory (October 21, 1877 – October 10, 1936) was an American attorney and politician, serving as a United States representative from Kentucky from 1927 to his death in 1936. He was a member of the Democratic Party.

== Biography ==
Gregory was born in Graves County, Kentucky, where he attended local schools. After college he taught school and served as superintendent of schools in the county. In the late 1890s he returned to college to study at the Cumberland School of Law at Cumberland University in Lebanon, Tennessee. He was admitted to the Kentucky bar in 1902, and set up a practice in the Graves county seat of Mayfield, Kentucky.

Gregory was elected county surveyor and served in that office 1902–1910. He served as judge of the Graves County Court from 1913 to 1919. Gregory was appointed as United States Attorney for the Western District of Kentucky by President Woodrow Wilson in 1919 and served in that position until 1923.

Gregory was also a member of the board of trustees of the Louisville Presbyterian Theological Seminary in Louisville, Kentucky from 1920 to 1927, serving as president from 1925 to 1927. He also served as vice president of the Jefferson Davis Memorial Commission.

In 1926, incumbent congressman Alben Barkley sought and won a seat in the United States Senate. Gregory sought election to the seat Barkley was vacating, and was elected to the House of Representatives that year. He represented Kentucky's 1st congressional district, the far western part of the state. Gregory continued to win re-election until his death on October 10, 1936. He is buried in Mayfield, Kentucky in Maplewood Cemetery.

At the time of his death Gregory had already received the Democratic Party nomination for another term in the House. Upon his death, his younger brother Noble Jones Gregory was given the Democratic nomination; he won the seat. He was re-elected for ten more terms, serving until 1959.

== See also ==
- List of members of the United States Congress who died in office (1900–1949)

== Sources ==
- United States Congress. "W. Voris Gregory (id: G000448)". Biographical Directory of the United States Congress.

U.S. House of Representatives
Preceded by Alben W. Barkley	Member of the U.S. House of Representatives from Kentucky's 1st congressional district 1927 – 1936	Succeeded by Noble J. Gregory
