= Thomas N. Stilwell =

American politician and lawyer

Thomas Stilwell
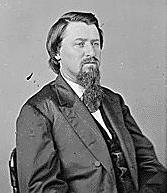

United States Ambassador to Venezuela
- In office December 16, 1867 – June 7, 1868
- President: Andrew Johnson
- Preceded by: James Wilson
- Succeeded by: James R. Partridge

Member of the U.S. House of Representatives from Indiana's 11th district
- In office March 4, 1865 – March 3, 1867
- Preceded by: James F. McDowell
- Succeeded by: John P. C. Shanks

Member of the Ohio House of Representatives from the ? district
- In office 1856–1856

Personal details
- Born: August 29, 1830 Stillwell, Ohio, U.S.
- Died: January 14, 1874 (aged 43) Anderson, Indiana, U.S
- Party: Republican

Military service
- Branch/service: U.S. Army (Union Army)
- Rank: 1st Lieutenant; Regimental Quartermaster
- Commands: 34th Indiana Infantry
- Battles/wars: American Civil War

Thomas Neel Stilwell (August 29, 1830 – January 14, 1874) was an American lawyer, banker, and politician who served one term as a U.S. representative from Indiana from 1865 to 1867.

== Biography ==
Born in Stillwell, Ohio, he attended Oxford and College Hill Colleges, where he studied law. He was admitted to the bar in 1852 and began practice in Anderson, Indiana.

He served as member of the Ohio House of Representatives in 1856. He served in the 34th Indiana Infantry Regiment of the Union Army during the Civil War as a 1st lieutenant and regimental quartermaster.

Stilwell was elected as a Republican to the Thirty-ninth Congress (March 4, 1865 – March 3, 1867).

He acted as Minister Resident to Venezuela in 1867 and 1868. He served as president of the First National Bank of Anderson, Indiana, until his death.

He died in Anderson as the result of a gunshot wound January 14, 1874. He was interred in Maplewood Cemetery.

U.S. House of Representatives
Preceded by James F. McDowell	Member of the U.S. House of Representatives from Indiana's 11th congressional district March 4, 1865 – March 3, 1867	Succeeded by John P. C. Shanks
Diplomatic posts
Preceded by James Wilson	United States Minister to Venezuela; 16 December 1867 – 7 June 1868	Succeeded by James R. Partridge
