= James Wilson (Indiana politician) =

American politician (1825–1867)

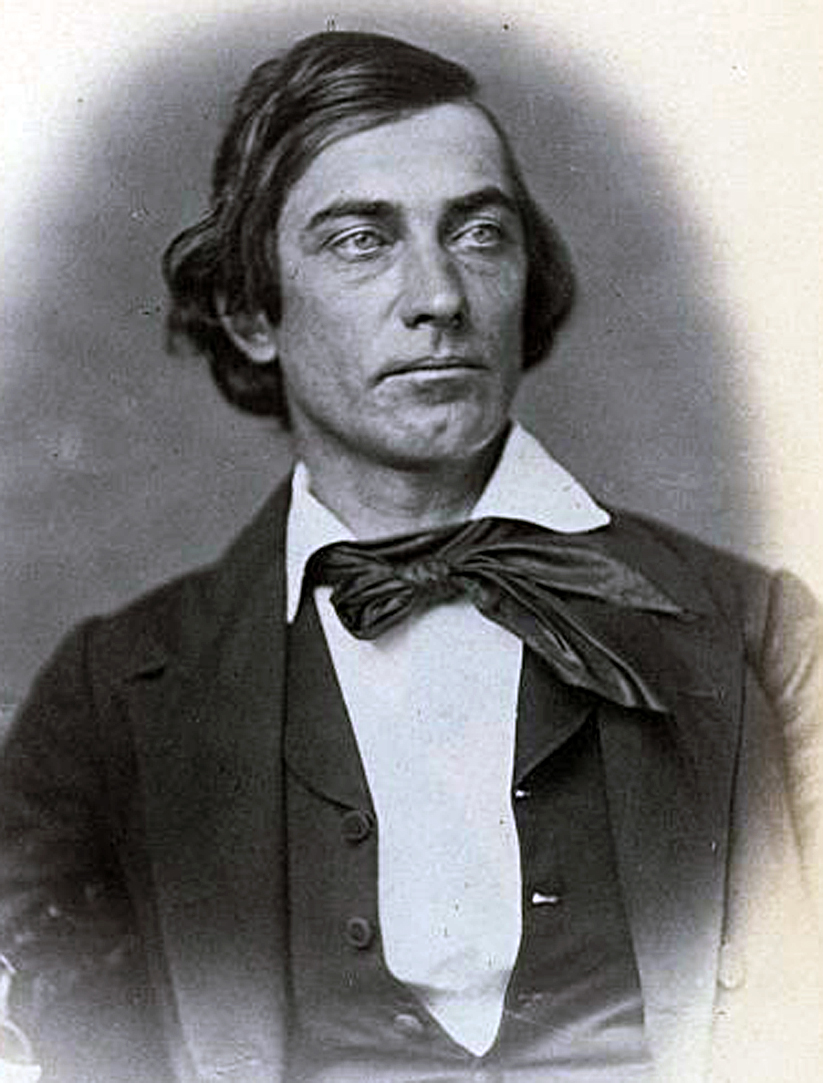

United States Minister to Venezuela
- In office October 10, 1866 – August 8, 1867
- President: Andrew Johnson
- Preceded by: Erastus D. Culver
- Succeeded by: Thomas N. Stilwell

Member of the U.S. House of Representatives from Indiana's 8th district
- In office March 4, 1857 – March 3, 1861
- Preceded by: Daniel Mace
- Succeeded by: Albert S. White

Personal details
- Born: April 9, 1825 Crawfordsville, Indiana
- Died: August 8, 1867 (aged 42) Caracas, Venezuela
- Party: Republican
- Spouse: Emma Ingersoll
- Children: 3, including John and Henry
- Education: Wabash College; Indiana University

Military service
- Allegiance: United States (Union)
- Branch/service: United States Army
- Years of service: 1846–1847 (United States); 1861–1865 (Union)
- Rank: Brevet Lieutenant Colonel
- Battles/wars: Mexican–American War; American Civil War

James Wilson (April 9, 1825 – August 8, 1867) was a United States representative from Indiana. He and his wife, Emma (Ingersoll) Wilson (daughter of Stephen Ingersoll and Hannah Elizabeth Bullard, sister to Lurton Dunham Ingersoll, were the parents of John Lockwood Wilson, Howard Wilson and Henry Lane Wilson.

== Biography ==
James Wilson was born in Crawfordsville, Indiana, in 1825. He graduated from Wabash College in Crawfordsville in 1842 at the age of 17. In 1845, he graduated from Indiana University in Bloomington, Indiana, with a degree in law.

=== Mexican-American War ===
Wilson served in the United States military during the Mexican–American War from June 17, 1846, to June 16, 1847.

=== Political career ===
After he returned to Crawfordsville in 1847, Wilson worked in the law office of Tilghman Howard (later the namesake of one of his sons), and he was admitted to the bar in 1848. Wilson became actively involved in politics in the mid-1850s, and he was a member of the newly formed Republican Party. In 1856, Wilson decided to run for the seat of 8th District Indiana Representative. During the election, Wilson defeated Daniel Wolsey Voorhees, and Wilson officially became a member of Congress on March 4, 1857. During the congressional election of 1858, Wilson was reelected. Wilson's time in Congress came to an end on March 3, 1861. He had served in the Thirty-Fifth and Thirty-Sixth Congresses of the United States of America.

=== Civil War ===
During the American Civil War, Wilson was appointed captain of Volunteers on November 26, 1862. He was honorably discharged from the military on December 6, 1865, with the rank of brevet lieutenant colonel. At the end of the war, Wilson returned to his law practice in Crawfordsville.

=== Later career and death ===
In 1866, President Andrew Johnson appointed Wilson to the position of Minister Resident to Venezuela. He served in this capacity from 1866 until his death in Caracas, Venezuela, on August 8, 1867. Wilson is buried in Oak Hill Cemetery, Crawfordsville, Indiana.

U.S. House of Representatives
Preceded by Daniel Mace	Member of the U.S. House of Representatives from Indiana's 8th congressional district 1857–1861	Succeeded by Albert S. White
Diplomatic posts
Preceded by Erastus D. Culver	United States Minister to Venezuela; 1866–1867	Succeeded by Thomas N. Stilwell
