= George R. Durgan =

American politician

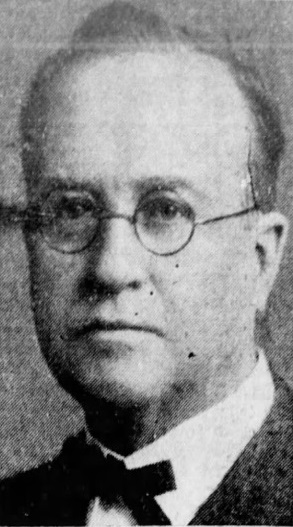
- Indianapolis Star, January 14, 1942

Member of the U.S. House of Representatives from Indiana's 2nd district
- In office March 4, 1933 – January 3, 1935
- Preceded by: Arthur H. Greenwood
- Succeeded by: Charles A. Halleck*

19th Mayor of Lafayette, Indiana
- In office 1904 – 1925 (except 1914–1916)
- Preceded by: Richard B. Sample

Personal details
- Born: January 20, 1872 Westpoint, Indiana, U.S.
- Died: January 13, 1942 (aged 69) Indianapolis, Indiana, U.S.
- Resting place: Springvale Cemetery, Lafayette, Indiana
- Party: Democratic
- Occupation: Salesman; Store owner

George Richard Durgan (January 20, 1872 – January 13, 1942) was an American politician who served one term as a U.S. representative from Indiana from 1933 to 1935.

== Biography ==
Born in Westpoint, Indiana, Durgan attended the village school there.

=== Early career ===
He moved to Lafayette, Indiana, in 1892 and was employed as a clerk and later as a traveling salesman. He engaged in mercantile pursuits.

He served as mayor of Lafayette from 1904 to 1913 and again from 1917 to 1925 and was delegate to the 1912 Democratic National Convention.

During his time as mayor, Durgan was an outspoken opponent of the Ku Klux Klan. He attempted to run for Governor of Indiana in 1924; his campaign announcement in Indianapolis was disrupted by hundreds of Klansmen, "nearly starting a riot."

Durgan was passed over for the Democratic gubernatorial nomination in favor of Carleton B. McCulloch, who lost the election to Republican Edward L. Jackson, who had the support of the Indiana Klan.

=== Congress ===
Durgan was elected as a Democrat to the 73rd Congress (March 4, 1933 – January 3, 1935). He was an unsuccessful candidate for reelection in 1934 to the 74th Congress. Durgan lost the 1934 election to Frederick Landis, who died before Congress convened.

=== Later career and death ===
He resumed mercantile pursuits. He was appointed to the Indiana Public Service Commission in 1941 and moved to Indianapolis, Indiana. He died in Indianapolis on January 13, 1942, and was interred in Springvale Cemetery in Lafayette.

== Legacy ==
The former Durgan elementary school in the Lafayette School Corporation was named in his honor.

U.S. House of Representatives
Preceded by Arthur H. Greenwood	Member of the U.S. House of Representatives from Indiana's 2nd congressional district 1933-1935	Succeeded by Charles A. Halleck
