= Gerald W. Landis =

American politician (1895–1971)

Gerald Landis
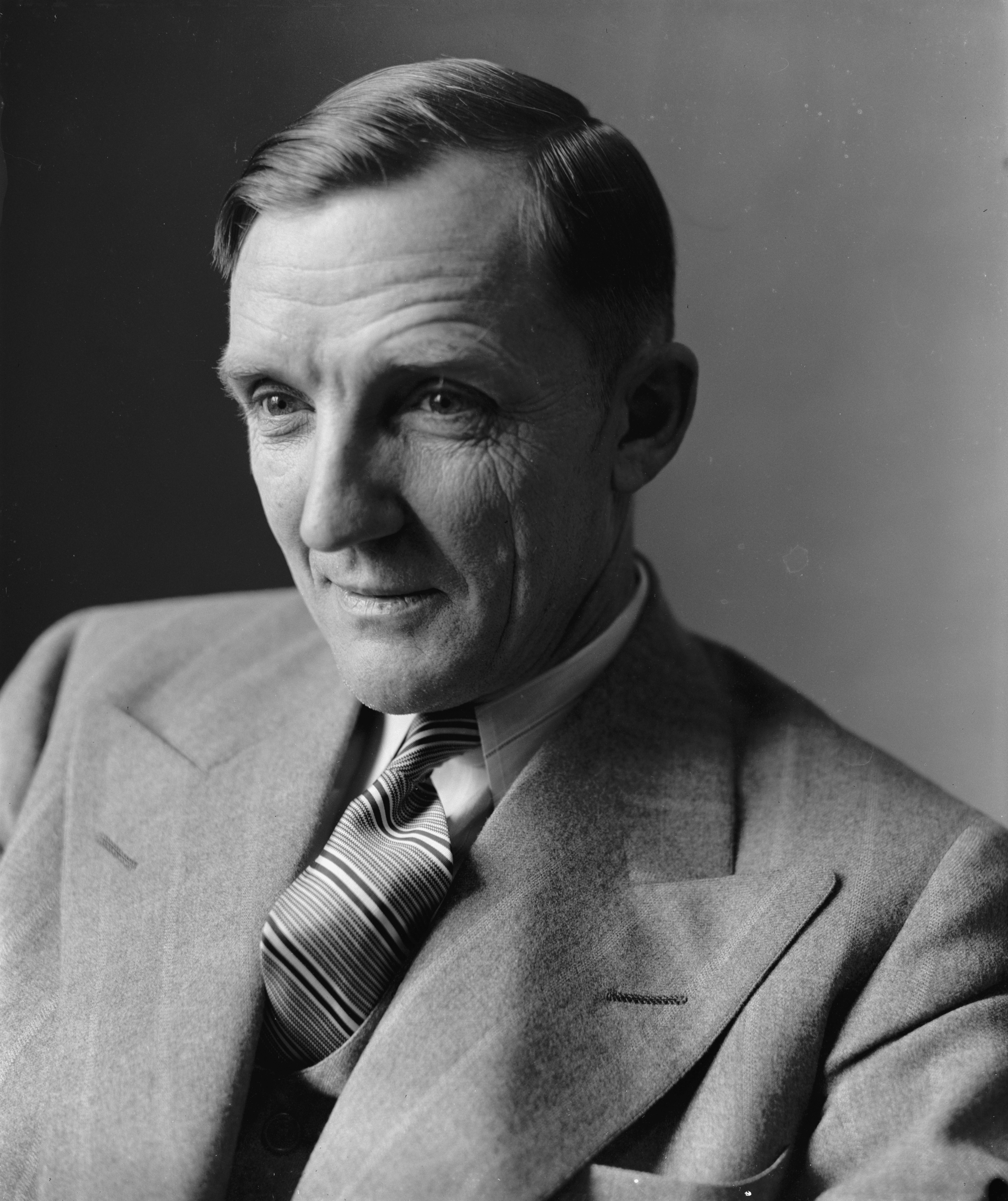

Member of the U.S. House of Representatives from Indiana's 7th district
- In office January 3, 1939 – January 3, 1949
- Preceded by: Arthur H. Greenwood
- Succeeded by: James E. Noland

Personal details
- Born: February 22, 1895 Bloomfield, Indiana, U.S.
- Died: September 6, 1971 (aged 76) Linton, Indiana, U.S
- Party: Republican
- Education: Indiana University

Military service
- Branch/service: United States Army
- Years of service: 1918–1919
- Rank: Lieutenant

Gerald Wayne Landis (February 23, 1895 – September 6, 1971) was an American educator and politician who served five terms as a U.S. representative from Indiana from 1939 to 1949.

== Biography ==
Born in Bloomfield, Indiana, Landis attended the public schools of Linton, Indiana. He served as a lieutenant in the Infantry of the United States Army in 1918 and 1919. He was graduated from Indiana University at Bloomington in 1923 and received a master's degree in 1938.

He played college football as a quarterback for the Indiana Hoosiers football team in the early 1920s. He taught in the high schools at Linton, Indiana, from 1923 to 1938.

=== Congress ===
Landis was elected as a Republican to the Seventy-sixth and to the four succeeding Congresses (January 3, 1939 – January 3, 1949). He was an unsuccessful candidate for reelection in 1948 to the Eighty-first Congress.

=== Later career and death ===
He served as a delegate to the Republican National Convention in 1944 and Indiana State convention in 1964. He served as assistant to the Administrator, Commodity Stabilization Service, Department of Agriculture, from April 1954 to January 1961.

He died in Linton, Indiana, September 6, 1971. He was interred in Fairview Cemetery.

== See also ==
- List of members of the House Un-American Activities Committee

U.S. House of Representatives
Preceded by Arthur H. Greenwood	Member of the U.S. House of Representatives from Indiana's 7th congressional district 1939-1949	Succeeded by James E. Noland
