= James F. McDowell =

American politician and lawyer

James McDowell
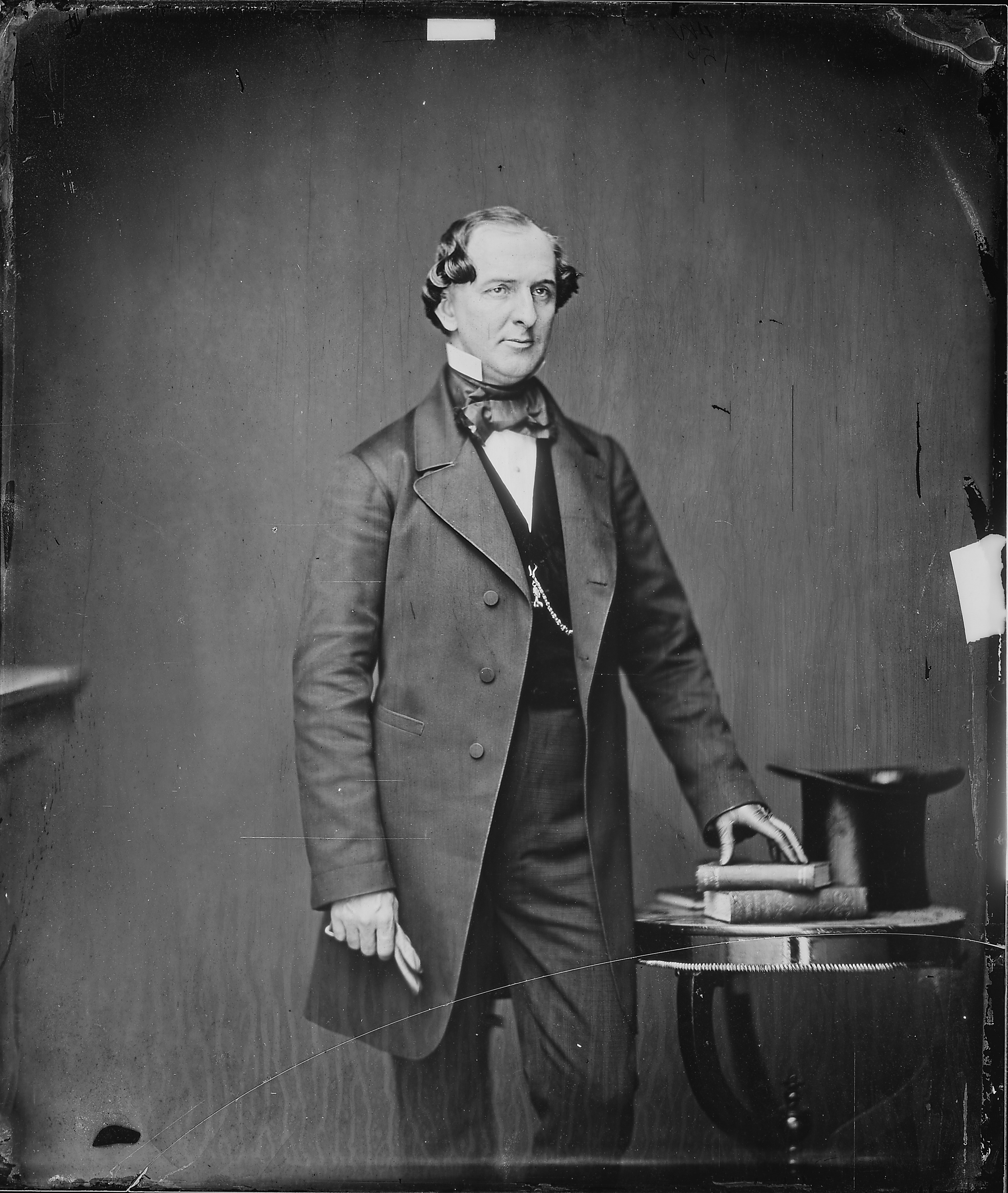

Member of the U.S. House of Representatives from Indiana's 11th district
- In office March 4, 1863 – March 3, 1865
- Preceded by: John P. C. Shanks
- Succeeded by: Thomas N. Stilwell

Personal details
- Born: December 3, 1825 Mifflin County, Pennsylvania, U.S.
- Died: April 18, 1887 (aged 61) Marion, Indiana, U.S.
- Party: Democratic

James Foster McDowell (December 3, 1825 – April 18, 1887) was an American lawyer and politician who served one term as a U.S. representative from Indiana 1863 to 1865.

== Biography ==
Born in Mifflin County, Pennsylvania, McDowell moved with his parents to Ohio in 1835. He attended the public schools. He worked in a printing office. He studied law. He was admitted to the bar in 1846 and practiced.

He served as prosecuting attorney of Darke County, Ohio, in 1848. He moved to Marion, Indiana, in 1851 and engaged in the practice of law. He established the Marion Journal in 1851.

=== Congress ===
McDowell was elected as a Democrat to the Thirty-eighth Congress (March 4, 1863 – March 3, 1865). He was an unsuccessful candidate for reelection in 1864 to the Thirty-ninth Congress.

=== Later career and death ===
He served as delegate to the Democratic National Convention in 1876. He engaged in the practice of law in Marion, Indiana, until his death in that city April 18, 1887. He was interred in Odd Fellows Cemetery.

U.S. House of Representatives
Preceded by John P. C. Shanks	Member of the U.S. House of Representatives from Indiana's 11th congressional district 1863–1865	Succeeded by Thomas N. Stilwell
