= Arthur H. Greenwood =

American politician (1880–1963)

Arthur Greenwood
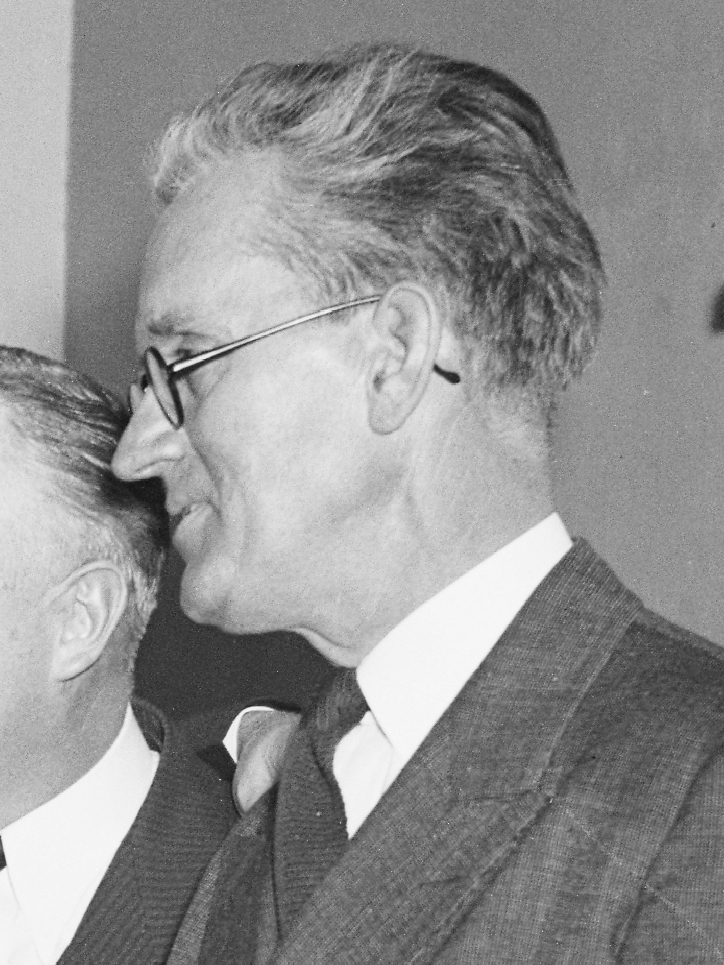

House Majority Whip
- In office March 4, 1933 – January 3, 1935
- Preceded by: John McDuffie
- Succeeded by: Patrick J. Boland

Member of the U.S. House of Representatives from Indiana
- In office March 3, 1923 – January 3, 1939
- Preceded by: Oscar E. Bland (2nd); Louis Ludlow (7th)
- Succeeded by: George R. Durgan (2nd); Gerald W. Landis (7th)
- Constituency: 2nd district (1923-33); 7th district (1933-39)

Personal details
- Born: January 31, 1880
- Died: April 26, 1963 (aged 83) Bethesda, Maryland, U.S.
- Party: Democratic
- Education: Indiana University; George Washington University

Arthur Herbert Greenwood (January 31, 1880 – April 26, 1963) was a United States representative for Indiana's 2nd congressional district from 1923 to 1933 and the 7th district from 1933 to 1939. Greenwood was defeated in 1938.

The Baptist lawyer, farmer and banker graduated from the Indiana University Bloomington in 1905, as well as The George Washington University. He served as a member of the board of education for Washington, Indiana, from 1910 to 1916. As a lawyer, Greenwood was county attorney of Daviess County 1911–1915, then as prosecuting attorney for the forty-ninth judicial circuit 1916–1918.

He served in the United States Congress from 1923 to 1939 and was House Majority Whip in the seventy-third Congress.

He served as a member of a number of commissions including:

- George Rogers Clark Memorial Commission

He lived in Bradenton, Florida, and died in 1963 in Bethesda, Montgomery County, Maryland, and was buried in Washington, Indiana.

U.S. House of Representatives
Preceded by Oscar E. Bland	Member of the U.S. House of Representatives from Indiana's 2nd congressional district 1923–1933	Succeeded by George R. Durgan
Preceded by Louis Ludlow	Member of the U.S. House of Representatives from Indiana's 7th congressional district 1933–1939	Succeeded by Gerald W. Landis
Party political offices
Preceded by John McDuffie (D-AL)	House Majority Whip; 1933–1935	Succeeded by Patrick J. Boland (D-PA)
