= Noble J. Johnson =

American politician and judge (1887–1968)

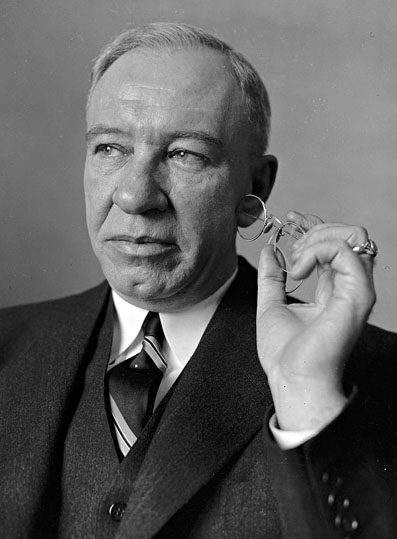

Senior Judge of the United States Court of Customs and Patent Appeals
- In office August 7, 1958 – March 17, 1968

Chief Judge of the United States Court of Customs and Patent Appeals
- In office July 19, 1956 – August 7, 1958
- Appointed by: Dwight D. Eisenhower
- Preceded by: Finis J. Garrett
- Succeeded by: Eugene Worley

Associate Judge of the United States Court of Customs and Patent Appeals
- In office June 10, 1948 – July 19, 1956
- Appointed by: Harry S. Truman
- Preceded by: Oscar E. Bland
- Succeeded by: Giles Rich

Member of the U.S. House of Representatives from Indiana's 6th district
- In office January 3, 1939 – July 1, 1948
- Preceded by: Virginia E. Jenckes
- Succeeded by: Cecil M. Harden

Member of the U.S. House of Representatives from Indiana's 5th district
- In office March 4, 1925 – March 3, 1931
- Preceded by: Everett Sanders
- Succeeded by: Courtland C. Gillen

Personal details
- Born: Noble Jacob Johnson; August 23, 1887 Terre Haute, Indiana
- Died: March 17, 1968 (aged 80) Washington, D.C.
- Resting place: Bethesda Cemetery, West Terre Haute
- Party: Republican
- Education: read law

Noble Jacob Johnson (August 23, 1887 – March 17, 1968) was a United States representative from Indiana and an associate judge and chief judge of the United States Court of Customs and Patent Appeals.

== Education and career ==
Born in Terre Haute, Indiana, Johnson attended the public schools. After reading law to be admitted to the bar in 1911, he commenced practice in Terre Haute from 1911 to 1917. He was a deputy prosecuting attorney for the forty-third judicial circuit of Indiana in 1917 and 1918. He served as prosecuting attorney for the same judicial circuit from 1921 to 1924.

== Congressional service ==
Johnson was elected as a Republican to the Sixty-ninth, Seventieth, and Seventy-first Congresses (March 4, 1925 – March 3, 1931). He was an unsuccessful candidate for reelection in 1930 to the Seventy-second Congress, and for election in 1936 to the Seventy-fifth Congress. However, he was elected to the Seventy-sixth and to the four succeeding Congresses and served from January 3, 1939, until his resignation on July 1, 1948.

== Federal judicial service ==
Johnson was nominated by President Harry S. Truman on May 28, 1948, to a seat on the United States Court of Customs and Patent Appeals vacated by Judge Oscar E. Bland. He was confirmed by the United States Senate on June 8, 1948, and received his commission on June 10, 1948. His service terminated on July 19, 1956, due to his elevation to be Chief Judge of the same court.

Johnson was nominated by President Dwight D. Eisenhower on May 17, 1956, to a seat on the United States Court of Customs and Patent Appeals vacated by Judge Finis J. Garrett. He was confirmed by the United States Senate on July 19, 1956, and received his commission the same day. He assumed senior status on August 7, 1958. Johnson was initially appointed as a Judge under Article I, but the court was raised to Article III status by operation of law on August 25, 1958, and Johnson thereafter served as an Article III Judge. His service terminated on March 17, 1968, due to his death.

== Death ==
Johnson died on March 17, 1968, in Washington, D.C., where he had resided since his judicial appointment. He was interred in Bethesda Cemetery, West Terre Haute, Indiana.

== Sources ==
- United States Congress. "Noble J. Johnson (id: J000165)". Biographical Directory of the United States Congress.
- "Johnson, Noble Jacob - Federal Judicial Center". www.fjc.gov.

U.S. House of Representatives
Preceded by Everett Sanders	Member of the United States House of Representatives from Indiana's 5th congressional district 1925–1931	Succeeded by Courtland C. Gillen
Preceded by Virginia E. Jenckes	Member of the United States House of Representatives from Indiana's 6th congressional district 1939–1948	Succeeded by Cecil M. Harden
Legal offices
Preceded by Oscar E. Bland	Associate Judge of the United States Court of Customs and Patent Appeals; 1948–1956	Succeeded by Giles Rich
Preceded by Finis J. Garrett	Chief Judge of the United States Court of Customs and Patent Appeals; 1956–1958	Succeeded by Eugene Worley
