= Young Turks (U.S. politics) =

Faction of the United States Republican Party

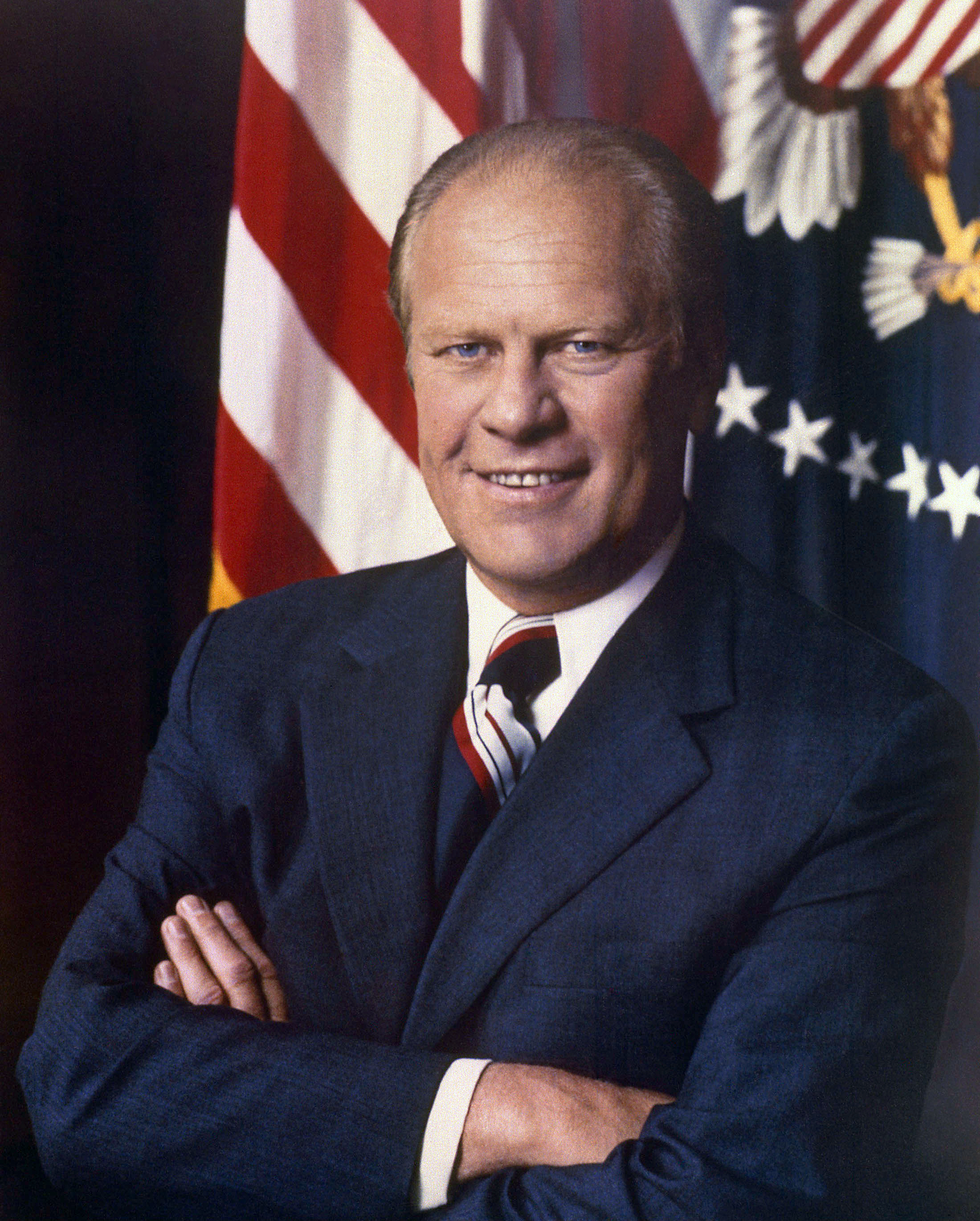
Gerald Ford

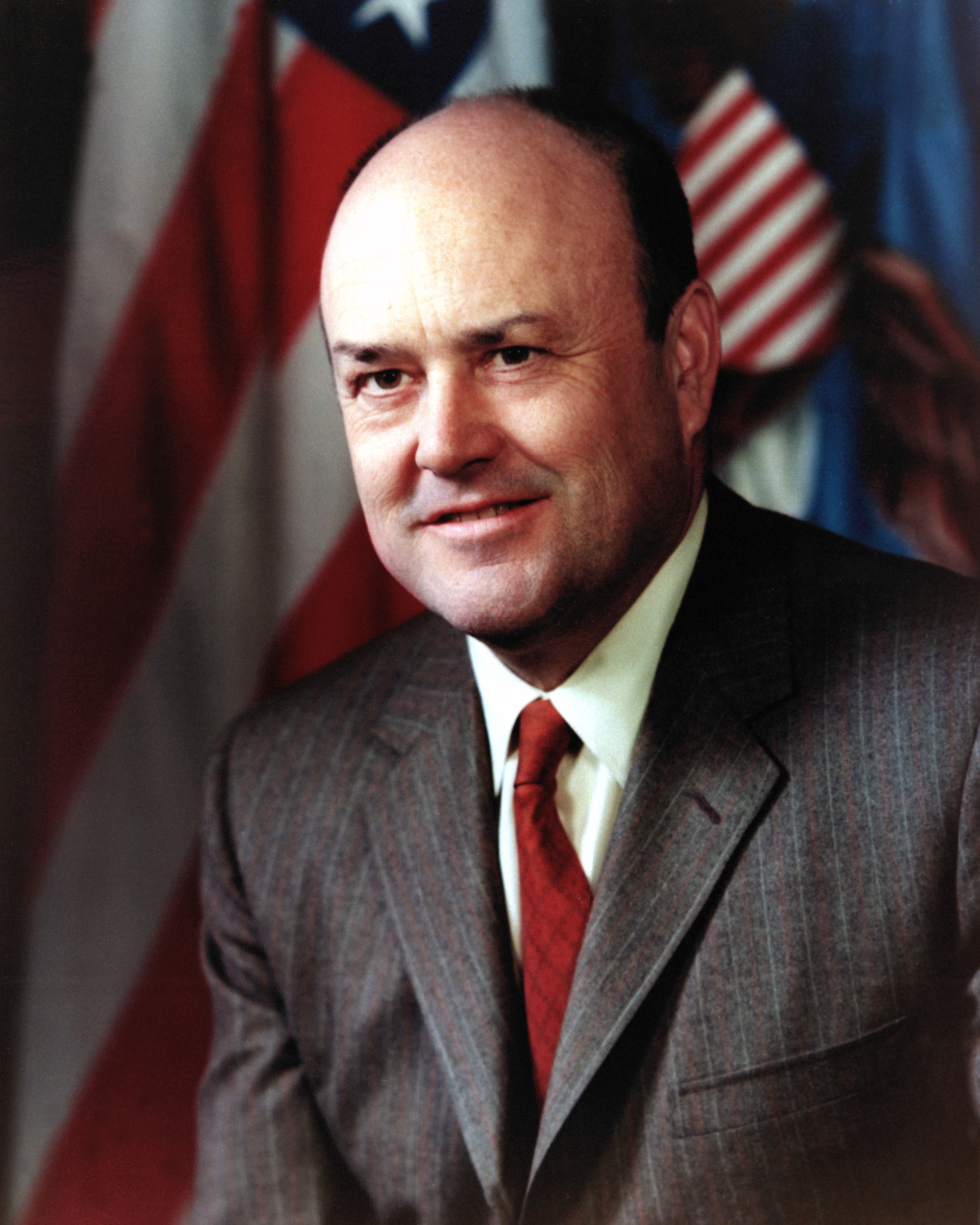
Melvin Laird

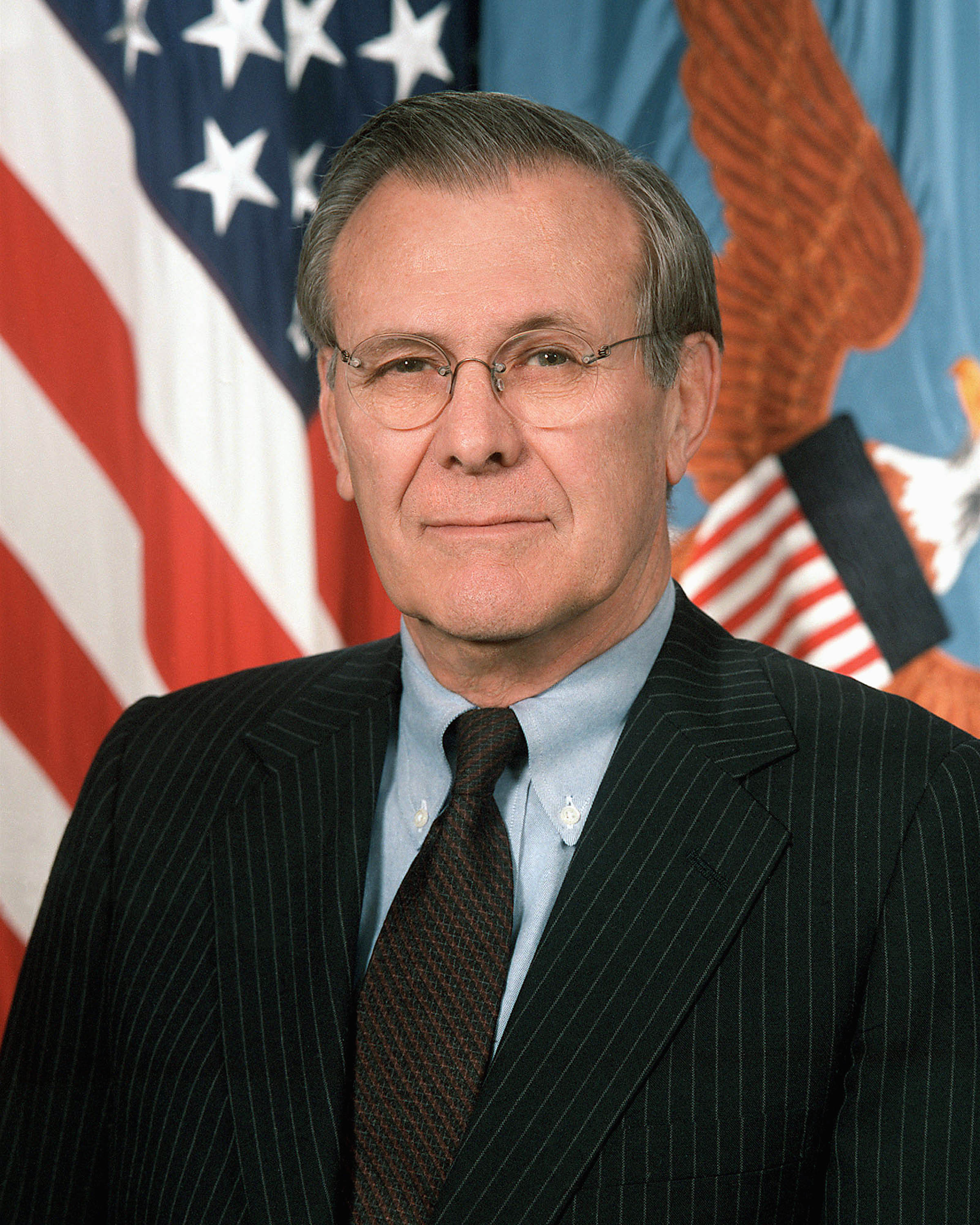
Donald Rumsfeld

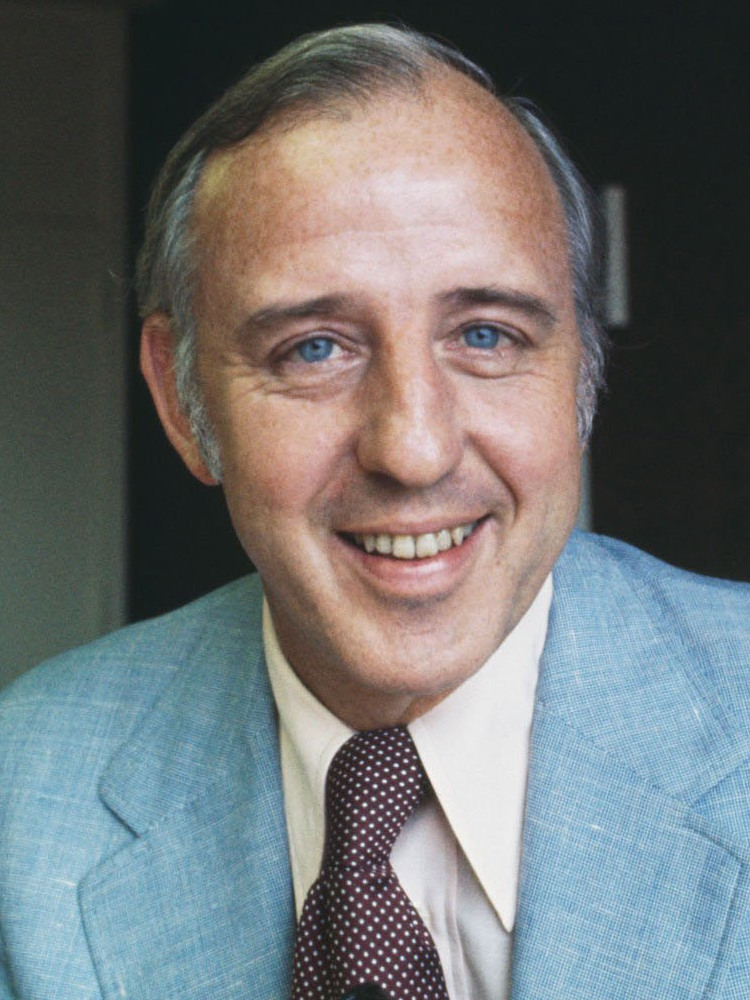
Charles Goodell

The Young Turks was a splinter group of politicians in the United States within the Republican Party during the early 1960s. The group, mostly consisting of congressmen who had become disenchanted with the course of the Republican Party, worked within the system to appoint their fellow members into leadership roles, so they could take control of the party. They were considered "rebels" by the traditional Republicans. Gerald Ford, who would become president of the United States, rose to prominence as a Young Turk.

== Etymology ==
There has been no special meaning given or discussed for the group's choice of the name "Young Turks" in any of the biographical collections of the members. The dictionary definition states, "an insurgent or a member of an insurgent group especially in a political party ... one advocating changes within a usually established group". On the other hand, the term Young Turks originally referred to a group of intellectuals during the 19th century Ottoman Empire, who were in opposition to Sultan Abdul Hamid II.

== Formation ==
The group began in the early 1960s as a loose network of younger Republican congressmen. According to an article that appeared in New York Magazine in 1975, Charles E. Goodell of New York and Robert P. Griffin of Michigan got together in January 1963 and came up with a plan to supplant one of the elder statesmen, Charles Hoeven, who was Chairman of the House Republican Conference. They solicited Gerald Ford of Michigan as the challenger. Ford agreed and won the ballot, becoming the new chairman.

It was Lyndon B. Johnson's landslide defeat of Barry Goldwater in the 1964 presidential election, coupled with heavy losses in the House, that mobilized all the key players to further action. The Young Turks questioned the Republican Party's viability and wanted to change the direction of the party. Donald Rumsfeld, another member of the group, later wrote about how dire it was, "Republicans in the U.S. House of Representatives were reduced to a low of 140 of the 435 Members of Congress. There were so many Democrats that some had to sit in the Republican side of the [a]isle."

The Young Turks decided it was time to take control and replace the top Republican leadership in Congress. They picked Gerald Ford over their other option, Melvin Laird (Wisconsin), to oust the presiding House Minority Leader, Charles Halleck. Their choice of Ford, and his subsequent win, set the stage for Ford to later be tapped as vice-president, and then president by succession.

== Members ==
According to New York, members included:

Overview of members
Photo	Member	Born	Died	District	In office	Offices held
	Gerald Ford	July 14, 1913; Omaha, Nebraska	December 26, 2006 (aged 93); Rancho Mirage, California	Michigan 5	1949–1973	Chair of House Republican Conference (1963–1965); Minority Leader (1965–1973); 40th Vice President (1973–1974); 38th President (1974–1977)
	Thomas B. Curtis	May 14, 1911; St. Louis, Missouri	January 10, 1993 (aged 81); Allegan, Michigan	Missouri 12 (1951–53); Missouri 2 (1953–69)	1951–1969	None
	Melvin Laird	September 1, 1922; Omaha, Nebraska	November 16, 2016 (aged 94); Fort Myers, Florida	Wisconsin 7	1953–1969	Chair of House Republican Conference (1965–1969); Secretary of Defense (1969–1973); Domestic Affairs Advisor (1973–1974)
	Robert P. Griffin	November 6, 1923; Detroit, Michigan	April 16, 2015 (aged 91); Traverse City, Michigan	Michigan 9	1957–1966	U.S. Senator (1966–1979); Senate Minority Whip (1969–1977); Justice of Michigan Supreme Court (1987–1995)
	Al Quie	September 18, 1923; Wheeling Township, Minnesota	August 18, 2023 (aged 99); Wayzata, Minnesota	Minnesota 1	1958–1979	Governor of Minnesota (1979–1983)
	Charles Goodell	March 16, 1926; Jamestown, New York	January 21, 1987 (aged 60); Washington, D.C.	New York 43 (1959–63); New York 38 (1963–68)	1959–1968	U.S. Senator (1968–1971)
	Robert Ellsworth	June 11, 1926; Lawrence, Kansas	May 9, 2011 (aged 84); Encinitas, California	Kansas 2 (1961–63); Kansas 3 (1963–67)	1961–1967	Permanent Representative to NATO (1969–1971); Deputy Secretary of Defense (1975–1977)
	Donald Rumsfeld	July 9, 1932; Chicago, Illinois	June 29, 2021 (aged 88); Taos, New Mexico	Illinois 13	1963–1969	OEO Director (1969–1970); Counselor to the President (1970–1971); Director of Cost of Living Council (1971–1973); Ambassador to NATO (1973–1974); White House Chief of Staff (1974–1975); Secretary of Defense (1975–1977; 2001–2006)
