= William Larrabee (Indiana politician) =

American politician

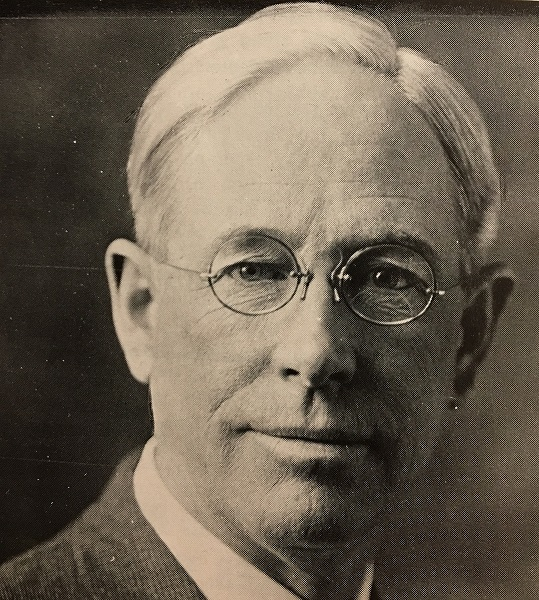

Member of the U.S. House of Representatives from Indiana
- In office March 4, 1931 – January 3, 1943
- Preceded by: Richard N. Elliott (6th); Glenn Griswold (11th)
- Succeeded by: Virginia E. Jenckes (6th); Louis Ludlow (11th)
- Constituency: 6th district (1931-33); 11th district (1933-43)

Personal details
- Born: February 21, 1870 Crawfordsville, Indiana, U.S.
- Died: November 16, 1960 (aged 90) New Palestine, Indiana, U.S
- Party: Democratic

William Henry Larrabee (February 21, 1870 – November 16, 1960) was an American physician and politician who served six terms as a U.S. representative from Indiana from 1931 to 1943.

== Early life ==
Larrabee was born on a farm near Crawfordsville, Indiana. He attended the public schools, Indiana Central Normal School at Danville, and Indiana State Normal School at Terre Haute. He taught in public schools at New Palestine, from 1889 until 1895, then attended Indiana School of Medicine at Indianapolis until 1898, and commenced the practice of medicine and surgery in New Palestine.

== Political career ==
Larrabee served as the secretary of Hancock County Board of Health in 1917–18, and on the city council of New Palestine, 1916–20. In 1930 he was elected to Congress as a Democrat, serving until January 3, 1943. In Congress, he served as chairman of the Committee on the Census (Seventy-fourth and Seventy-fifth Congresses) and the Committee on Education (Seventy-fifth through Seventy-seventh Congresses)

Larrabee represented Indiana's 11th congressional district which included Hamilton County and the surrounding area.

During World War II Larrabee was against isolationism and campaigned in favor of helping the British throughout 1940. Due to this he engaged in many heated arguments with his fellow Democrat Louis Ludlow who was an isolationist (Ludlow's district consisted primarily of Indianapolis). In between July 25, 1940, when France surrendered, and June 22, 1941, when the Nazis invaded the Soviet Union, Britain was effectively alone. During this time, Larrabee, as well as fellow Indiana congressman John W. Boehne Jr. campaigned explicitly in favor of giving Britain any aid possible. They were the only two Indiana representatives who voted in favor of the 1941 Lend Lease Act. Larrabee explicitly advocated entering the war on the British side throughout the year before the attack on Pearl Harbor.

=== Later career and death ===
After losing the 1942 election, he resumed the practice of medicine and surgery. Larrabee died in New Palestine, Indiana and is buried in the New Palestine Cemetery.

U.S. House of Representatives
Preceded by Richard N. Elliott	Member of the U.S. House of Representatives from Indiana's 6th congressional district 1931-1933	Succeeded by Virginia E. Jenckes
Preceded by Glenn Griswold	Member of the U.S. House of Representatives from Indiana's 11th congressional district 1933-1943	Succeeded by Louis Ludlow
