= 1996 United States House of Representatives elections in Indiana =

- November 5, 1996

All 10 Indiana seats to the United States House of Representatives
	Majority party	Minority party
Party	Republican	Democratic
Last election	6	4
Seats won	6	4
Seat change	Steady	Steady
Popular vote	1,109,066	930,919
Percentage	52.84%	44.34%

Republican
40–50%
50–60%
60–70%
70–80%
80–90%
Democratic
40–50%
50–60%
60–70%

The 1996 congressional elections in Indiana were elections for Indiana's delegation to the United States House of Representatives, which occurred along with congressional elections nationwide on November 5, 1996. Republicans held a majority of Indiana's delegation over the Democrats, 6–4. Representatives were elected using the U.S. congressional districts based on the 1990 U.S. census.

== Results ==
The following are the final results from the Secretary of State of Indiana.

== Overview ==
United States House of Representatives elections in Indiana, 1996
Party	Votes	Percentage	Seats	+/–
Republican	1,109,066	52.84%	6	-
Democratic	930,919	44.34%	4	-
Libertarian	59,085	2.81%	0	-
Others	7	<0.01%	0	-
Totals	2,099,077	100.00%	10	-

== See also ==
- 1996 United States House of Representatives elections

Preceded by 1994 elections	United States House elections in Indiana; 1996	Succeeded by 1998 elections
