= George W. Rauch =

American politician (1876–1940)

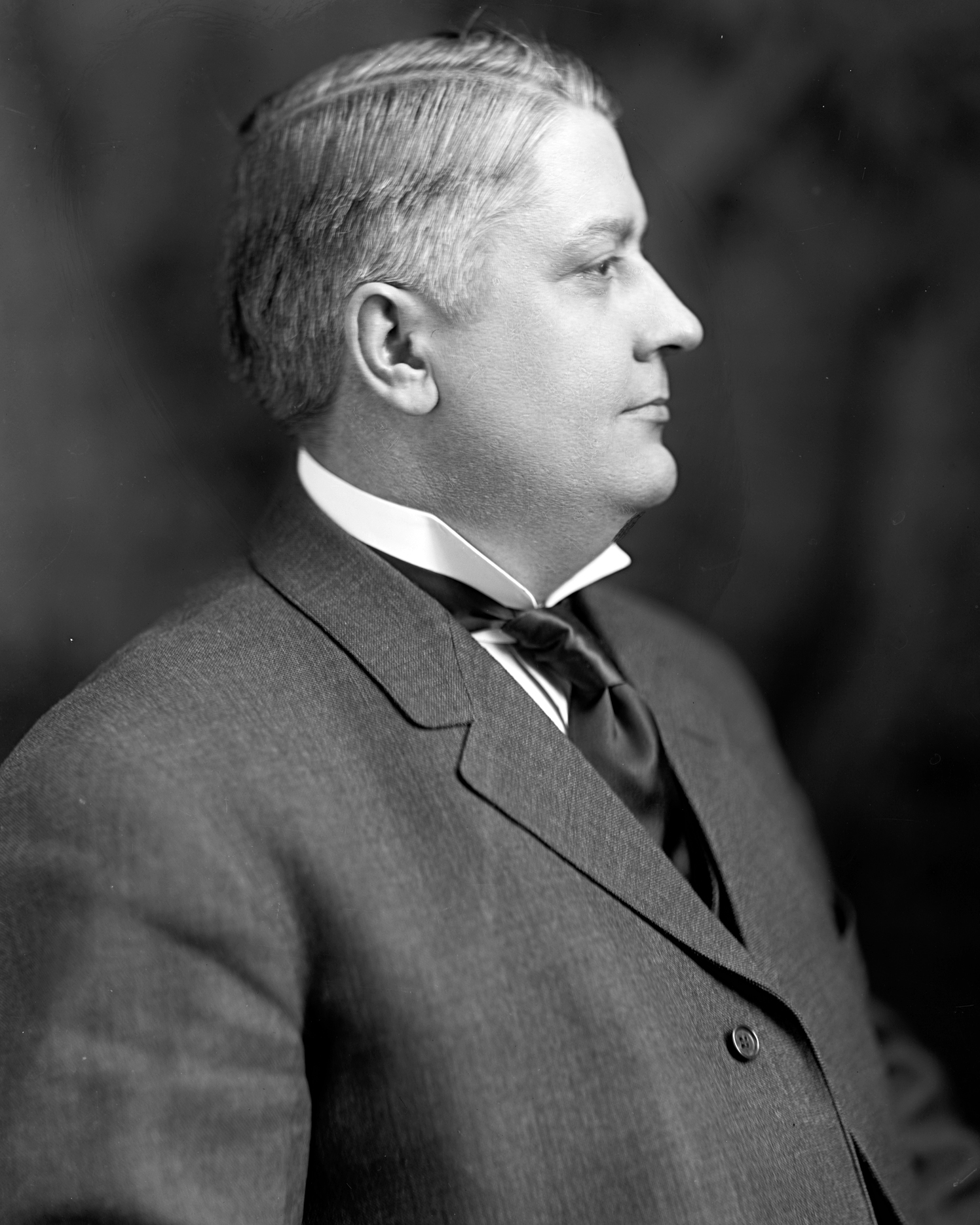
- Rauch, 1905–1940

Member of the U.S. House of Representatives from Indiana's 11th district
- In office March 4, 1907 – March 3, 1917
- Preceded by: Frederick Landis
- Succeeded by: Milton Kraus

Personal details
- Born: February 22, 1876 Indiana, U.S.
- Died: November 4, 1940 (aged 64) Marion, Indiana, U.S
- Party: Democratic
- Education: Northern Indiana Law School

George Washington Rauch (February 22, 1876 – November 4, 1940) was an American lawyer and politician who served five terms as a U.S. representative from Indiana from 1907 to 1917.

== Early life and career ==
Born on a farm near Warren in Salamonie Township, Indiana, Rauch attended the common schools and Valparaiso (Indiana) Normal School (now Valparaiso University). He was graduated from the Northern Indiana Law School at Valparaiso in 1902. George was admitted to the bar the same year and commenced the practice of law in Marion, Indiana.

== Congress ==
Rauch was elected as a Democrat to the Sixtieth and to the four succeeding Congresses (March 4, 1907 – March 3, 1917). He was an unsuccessful candidate for reelection in 1916 to the Sixty-fifth Congress.

== Later career and death ==
He resumed the practice of his profession in Marion, Indiana, served on the board of directors of the Motor Securities Corporation and as president and treasurer of the Davis Records Co.. He was appointed a Federal bank receiver for banks in Swayzee, Sheridan, and Marion, Indiana, serving from 1930 to 1939. He served as member of the city school board 1927–1933. He died in Marion, Indiana, November 4, 1940. He was interred in Masonic Cemetery, Warren, Indiana.

== Family ==
Rauch and his wife Emma had two sons and a daughter named George W. Rauch Jr., Martha Ellen Rauch, and Richard A. Rauch. The name George W. Rauch has been passed down for five generations as of 2022. His son George W. Rauch Jr. (1919–2011) was a prominent attorney in Chicago who had three children (Jane, Lynn and George W Rauch III) and three step-daughters (Alison Farlow, Juliet Farlow and Lesley Farlow). George W. Rauch III (1944–) who is currently living in the Gulf Coast of Florida. George W. Rauch III is the father of four children (3 sons and 1 daughter), his second son, George W Rauch IV and his daughter Ellis are both married. Second born son, George W Rauch IV (1980–) has three children (George W. Rauch V, born 2009, Molly and Patrick). Daughter Ellis has two boys (Hayne Richard Falck 2009 and Andrew Katzenbach Falck 2010).

U.S. House of Representatives
Preceded by Frederick Landis	Member of the U.S. House of Representatives from Indiana's 11th congressional district 1907–1917	Succeeded by Milton Kraus
