= Charles A. Halleck =

American politician (1900–1986)

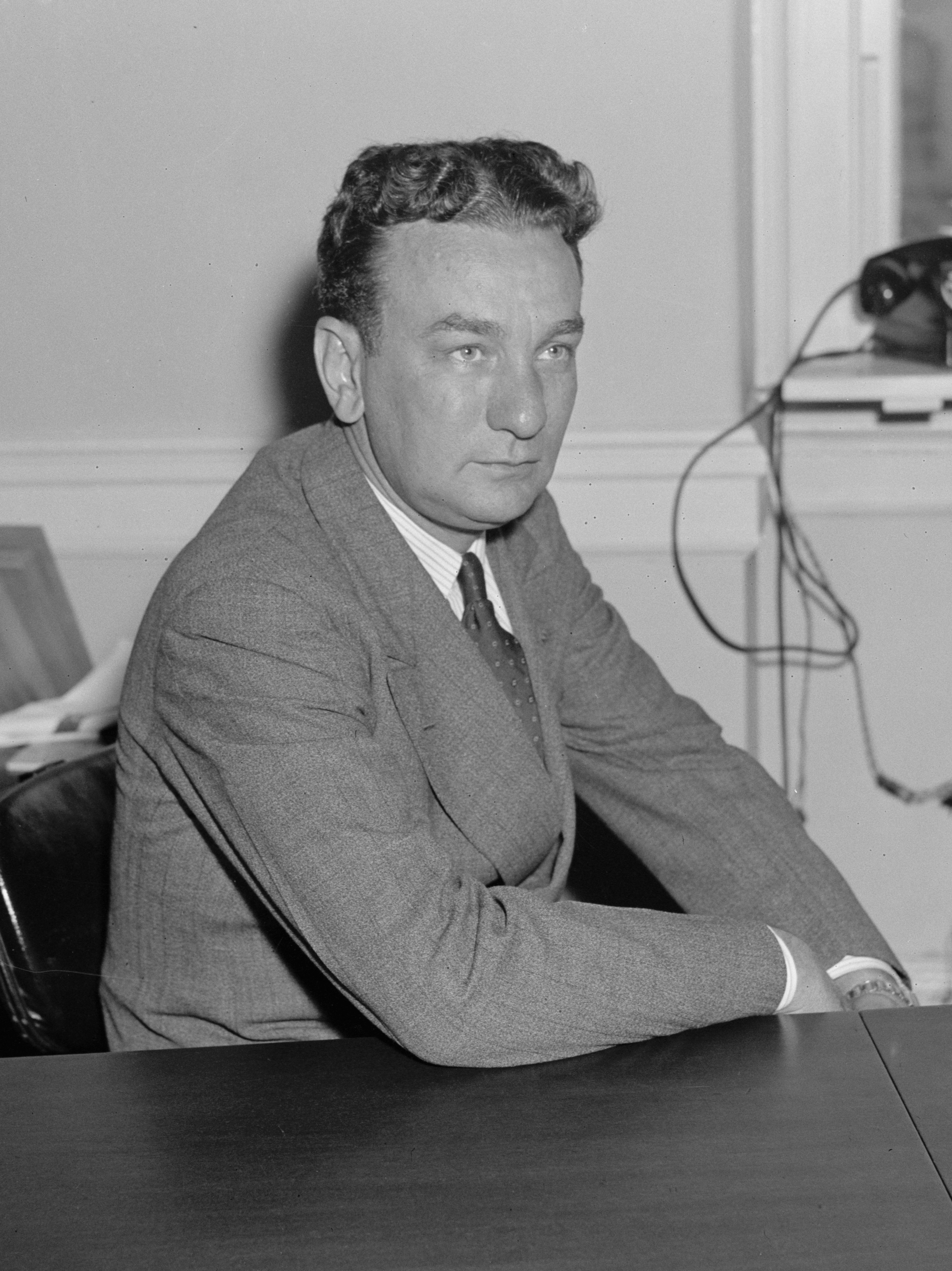
- Halleck in 1939

Member of the U.S. House of Representatives from Indiana's 2nd district
- In office January 29, 1935 – January 3, 1969
- Preceded by: George R. Durgan
- Succeeded by: Earl Landgrebe
House positions
House Minority Leader
In office January 3, 1959 – January 3, 1965
Deputy	Leslie C. Arends
Preceded by	Joseph W. Martin Jr.
Succeeded by	Gerald Ford
Leader of the House Republican Conference
In office January 3, 1959 – January 3, 1965
Preceded by	Joseph W. Martin Jr.
Succeeded by	Gerald Ford
House Majority Leader
In office January 3, 1947 – January 3, 1949
Speaker	Joseph W. Martin Jr.
Preceded by	John W. McCormack
Succeeded by	John W. McCormack
In office January 3, 1953 – January 3, 1955
Speaker	Joseph W. Martin Jr.
Preceded by	John W. McCormack
Succeeded by	John W. McCormack

Personal details
- Born: August 22, 1900 DeMotte, Indiana, U.S.
- Died: March 3, 1986 (aged 85) Lafayette, Indiana, U.S.
- Party: Republican
- Spouse: Blanche Annette White (m. 1927; died 1973)
- Children: 2
- Education: Indiana University, Bloomington (AB, LLB)
- Occupation: Lawyer; politician

Military service
- Allegiance: United States
- Branch: (United States Army)
- Conflict: World War I
- Charles A. Halleck's voice Halleck congratulates John W. McCormack on being elected as the 45th speaker of the House of Representatives; Recorded January 10, 1962

Charles Abraham Halleck (August 22, 1900 – March 3, 1986) was an American politician. He was the Republican leader of the United States House of Representatives from the second district of Indiana.

== Early life and education ==
Halleck was born near DeMotte, in Jasper County, Indiana, the son of Abraham and Lura (née Luce) Halleck. He served in the infantry of the United States Army in World War I. After military service, Halleck attended Indiana University at Bloomington. In 1924, Halleck was admitted to the bar and began practicing in Rensselaer, Indiana. From 1924 to 1934, he was the prosecuting attorney for the 13th district court.

== Career ==
In 1935, Halleck was elected to fill the House vacancy created by the death of Congressman-elect Frederick Landis, and remained in that position until 1969. A prominent member of the conservative coalition, he served as the House Majority Leader after the elections of 1946 and 1952. He was House Minority Leader from 1959 to 1964. As Minority Leader he was in charge of House Republicans

Halleck noted that a highlight of his career came at the 1940 Republican National Convention, when he nominated another person from Indiana, Wendell Willkie. Noting the mixed reception he got, Halleck said, "I got more brickbats and more bouquets over that speech than any other I've ever made."

In 1944, even before Thomas Dewey was named as the Republican presidential nominee, Halleck, as the new chairman of the National Republican Congressional Committee, addressed a party gathering in Chicago. He rejected the Democratic "don't-change-horses-while-crossing-the-stream" mantra and declared that a Republican president would retain George C. Marshall, Dwight Eisenhower, Douglas MacArthur, and William F. Halsey in their military positions. He attacked what he called the New Deal "snooping into our ice boxes," a reference to the Office of Price Administration and rationing. Halleck said that Americans should "live again as God meant us to live and not as some bureaucrat in Washington... would like us to live."

According to Halleck, he was rumored to be Thomas Dewey's vice-presidential nominee in Dewey's second general election campaign in 1948 if Halleck guaranteed the support of the Indiana delegation at the 1948 Republican National Convention. In the end, Dewey selected the governor of California, Earl Warren. The Dewey-Warren ticket surprisingly narrowly lost that November, to the Democratic Truman-Barkley ticket.

In 1959, with the declining popularity of Eisenhower enabling Democrats to maintain their hold on the House, Halleck parlayed his following among Congressional Republicans and the frequent public approval of Eisenhower and Richard Nixon into a successful challenge to the 20-year reign of Joseph W. Martin Jr. as the leader of House Republicans, beginning a three-term stint as the official Minority Leader of the United States House of Representatives.

He was a strong opponent of the liberal social proposals of Democrats John F. Kennedy and Lyndon Johnson and supported the Vietnam War, but voted in favor of the Civil Rights Acts of 1957, 1960, and 1964, as well as the 24th Amendment to the U.S. Constitution and the Voting Rights Act of 1965. Halleck voted in favor of the initial House resolution for the Civil Rights Act of 1968 on August 16, 1967, but voted against the Senate amendment to the bill on April 10, 1968. Along with Senator Everett Dirksen, he was the face of the Republican Party in most of the 1960s, and both made frequent appearances on television news and talk programs. The press jocularly nicknamed his joint appearances with Everett Dirksen as "The Ev & Charlie Show."

After the heavy election setbacks of 1964, Halleck was defeated in his bid to remain Minority Leader by Gerald Ford, who was the nominee of the Young Turks.

== Legacy ==
In 1983, U.S. President Ronald Reagan signed a bill renaming the Federal District Court building in Lafayette, Indiana, the Charles A. Halleck Federal Building.

The Charles Halleck Student Center at Saint Joseph's College in Indiana was named after him. It was listed on the National Register of Historic Places in 2016.

== Personal life ==
Halleck married Blanche Annetta White in 1927, and she died in 1973. They had two children, Charles W. and Patricia. His son, Charles W. Halleck, became an attorney in Washington, D.C., and was a judge of the Superior Court of the District of Columbia.

== Death ==
Halleck died in Lafayette, Indiana, on March 3, 1986, and is buried next to his wife in Rensselaer.

== In popular culture ==
- Halleck was portrayed by actor Arthur Franz in the 1974 made-for-television film, The Missiles of October, a dramatization based on John F. Kennedy and the Cuban Missile Crisis.

U.S. House of Representatives
Preceded by George R. Durgan	U.S. Representative of Indiana's 2nd Congressional District; 1935–1969	Succeeded by Earl Landgrebe
Party political offices
Preceded by John W. McCormack	House Majority Leader; 1947–1949; 1953–1955	Succeeded by John W. McCormack
Preceded by Joseph W. Martin Jr.	House Minority Leader; 1959–1965	Succeeded by Gerald Ford
