= James L. Evans =

American politician

James LaFayette Evans
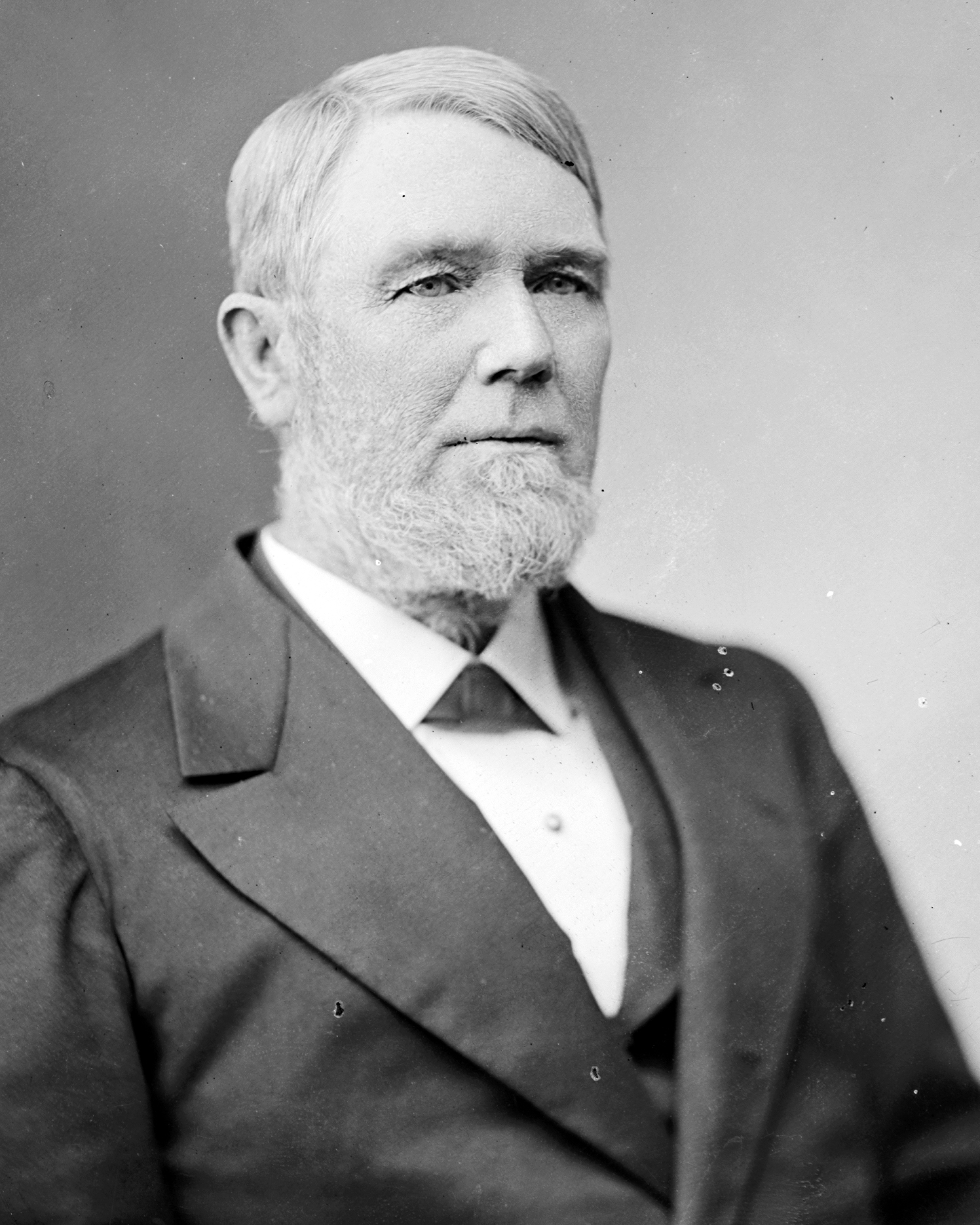

Member of the U.S. House of Representatives from Indiana's 11th district
- In office March 4, 1875 – March 3, 1879
- Preceded by: District inactive
- Succeeded by: Calvin Cowgill

Personal details
- Born: March 27, 1825 Clayville, Kentucky, U.S.
- Died: May 28, 1903 (aged 78) Noblesville, Indiana, U.S.
- Party: Republican

James La Fayette Evans (March 27, 1825 – May 28, 1903) was an American businessman and politician who served two terms as a U.S. representative from Indiana from 1875 to 1879.

== Biography ==
Born in Clayville, Kentucky, Evans moved to Indiana, with his parents, who settled in Hancock County in 1837. He moved to Marion, Indiana, in 1845 and engaged in mercantile pursuits.

He settled in Noblesville in 1850 and continued mercantile pursuits. He also engaged in the grain-elevator business and in the pork-packing business.

=== Congress ===
Evans was elected as a Republican to the Forty-fourth and Forty-fifth Congresses (March 4, 1875 - March 3, 1879). He was not a candidate for renomination in 1878. He resumed the grain-elevator business.

=== Death ===
He died in Noblesville, Indiana on May 28, 1903, aged 78, and was interred in Crownland Cemetery.

U.S. House of Representatives
Preceded by District inactive	Member of the U.S. House of Representatives from Indiana's 11th congressional district 1875–1879	Succeeded by Calvin Cowgill
