= John P. C. Shanks =

American politician (1826–1901)

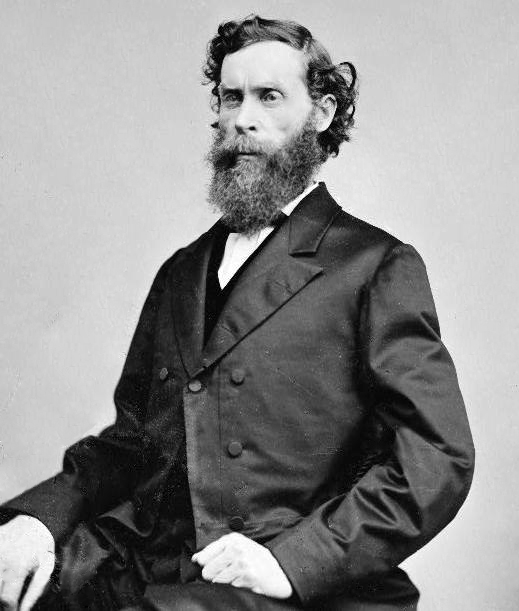
- Portrait by Mathew Brady, c. 1870

Member of the U.S. House of Representatives from Indiana
- In office March 4, 1867 – March 3, 1875
- Preceded by: Thomas N. Stilwell
- Succeeded by: Andrew H. Hamilton
- Constituency: 11th district (1867‍–‍1869); 9th district (1869‍–‍1875)
- In office March 4, 1861 – March 3, 1863
- Preceded by: John U. Pettit
- Succeeded by: James F. McDowell
- Constituency: 11th district

Member of the Indiana House of Representatives
- In office October 9, 1878 – October 12, 1880
- Preceded by: Jacob H. Koontz
- Succeeded by: David V. Baker; John W. Ryan
- Constituency: Jay and Delaware Counties
- In office October 11, 1854 – October 6, 1856
- Preceded by: Joseph J. McKinney
- Succeeded by: Joseph J. McKinney
- Constituency: Jay County

Personal details
- Born: John Peter Cleaver Shanks; June 17, 1826 Martinsburg, Virginia (now West Virginia), U.S.
- Died: January 23, 1901 (aged 74) Portland, Indiana, U.S.
- Resting place: Green Park Cemetery
- Party: Republican
- Occupation: Lawyer; politician

Military service
- Allegiance: United States (Union)
- Branch/service: United States Army
- Rank: Colonel (Regular Army); Brevet Major General (U.S. Volunteers)
- Commands: 7th Indiana Cavalry Regiment
- Battles/wars: American Civil War

John Peter Cleaver Shanks (June 17, 1826 – January 23, 1901) was a U.S. representative from Indiana from 1867 to 1875 and an officer in the Union Army during the American Civil War.

== Biography ==
Born in Martinsburg, Virginia (now West Virginia), Shanks pursued an academic course. He studied law and was admitted to the bar in 1848 and commenced practice in Portland, Indiana, in 1849. He served as prosecuting attorney of Jay County in 1850 and 1851 and served as member of the State house of representatives in 1855.

=== Congress ===
Shanks was elected as a Republican to the Thirty-seventh Congress (March 4, 1861 – March 3, 1863). He was an unsuccessful candidate for reelection in 1862 to the Thirty-eighth Congress.

=== Civil War ===
During the Civil War he served in the Union Army as a colonel and aide-de-camp to Major General John C. Fremont from September 20, 1861, to June 1862. He was appointed a colonel in the regular army and aide-de-camp from March 31, 1862, to October 9, 1863. He commanded the 7th Indiana Cavalry Regiment as colonel from October 9, 1863, to December 8, 1864. On December 12, 1864, President of the United States Abraham Lincoln nominated Shanks for appointment to the grade of brevet brigadier general of volunteers, to rank from December 8, 1864, and the United States Senate confirmed the appointment on February 14, 1865. He then commanded Brigade 1 of the Cavalry Division of the Department of Mississippi from December 8, 1864, to September 19, 1865, when he was mustered out of the volunteers.

On December 3, 1867, President Andrew Johnson nominated Shanks for appointment to the grade of brevet major general of volunteers, to rank from March 13, 1865, and the United States Senate confirmed the appointment on February 14, 1868.

=== Return to Congress ===
Shanks was elected to the Fortieth and to the three succeeding Congresses (March 4, 1867 – March 3, 1875) and served as chairman of the Committee on Militia (Forty-first Congress) and the Committee on Indian Affairs (Forty-second Congress).

=== Later career ===
Shanks was an unsuccessful candidate for renomination in 1874. He resumed the practice of his profession. He was again a member of the State house of representatives in 1879.

=== Death and burial ===
Shanks died in Portland, Indiana, January 23, 1901 and was interred in Green Park Cemetery.

== See also ==
- List of American Civil War brevet generals (Union)

== Notes ==
U.S. House of Representatives
| Preceded by John U. Pettit | Member of the U.S. House of Representatives from Indiana's 11th congressional district March 4, 1861 – March 3, 1863 (obsolete district) | Succeeded by James F. McDowell |
| Preceded by Thomas N. Stilwell | Member of the U.S. House of Representatives from Indiana's 11th congressional district March 4, 1867 – March 3, 1869 (obsolete district) | Succeeded by Jasper Packard |
| Preceded by Schuyler Colfax | Member of the U.S. House of Representatives from Indiana's 9th congressional district March 4, 1869 – March 3, 1875 | Succeeded by Thomas J. Cason |
