= Samuel E. Cook =

American politician

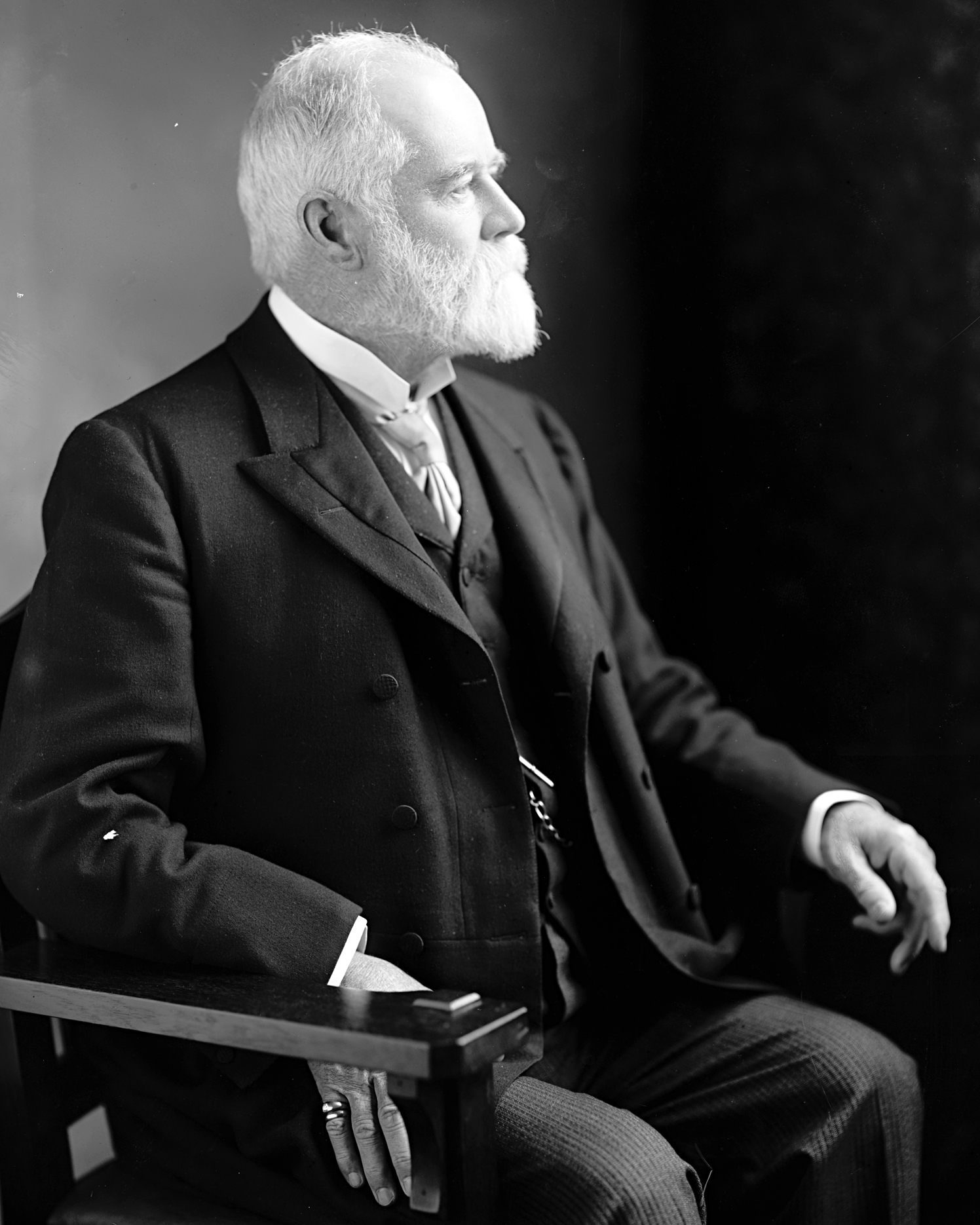

Member of the U.S. House of Representatives from Indiana's 11th district
- In office March 4, 1923 – March 3, 1925
- Preceded by: Milton Kraus
- Succeeded by: Albert R. Hall

Personal details
- Born: September 30, 1860 Huntington County, Indiana, U.S.
- Died: February 22, 1946 (aged 85) Huntington, Indiana, U.S.
- Resting place: Mount Hope Cemetery
- Party: Democratic

Samuel Ellis Cook (September 30, 1860 – February 22, 1946) was an American lawyer, jurist, and politician who served one term as a U.S. representative from Indiana from 1923 to 1925.

== Biography ==
Born on a farm in Huntington County, Indiana, Cook attended the common schools in Whitley County and the normal schools at Columbia City, Indiana, and Ada, Ohio. He taught school and engaged in agricultural pursuits. He studied law. He was graduated from the law department of Valparaiso University, Indiana, in 1888. He was admitted to the bar the same year and commenced practice in Huntington, Indiana.

He served as prosecuting attorney for Huntington County 1892–1894. He served as delegate to the Democratic National Convention in 1896. Editorial writer for the Huntington News-Democrat 1896–1900. He served as judge of the Huntington circuit court for the fifty-sixth judicial district 1906–1918.

=== Congress ===
Cook was elected as a Democrat to the Sixty-eighth Congress (March 4, 1923 – March 3, 1925). He was an unsuccessful candidate for reelection in 1924 to the Sixty-ninth Congress.

=== Later career and death ===
He resumed the practice of law in Huntington, Indiana, where he died February 22, 1946. He was interred in Mount Hope Cemetery.

U.S. House of Representatives
Preceded by Milton Kraus	Member of the U.S. House of Representatives from Indiana's 11th congressional district 1923–1925	Succeeded by Albert R. Hall
