= Glenn Griswold =

American politician

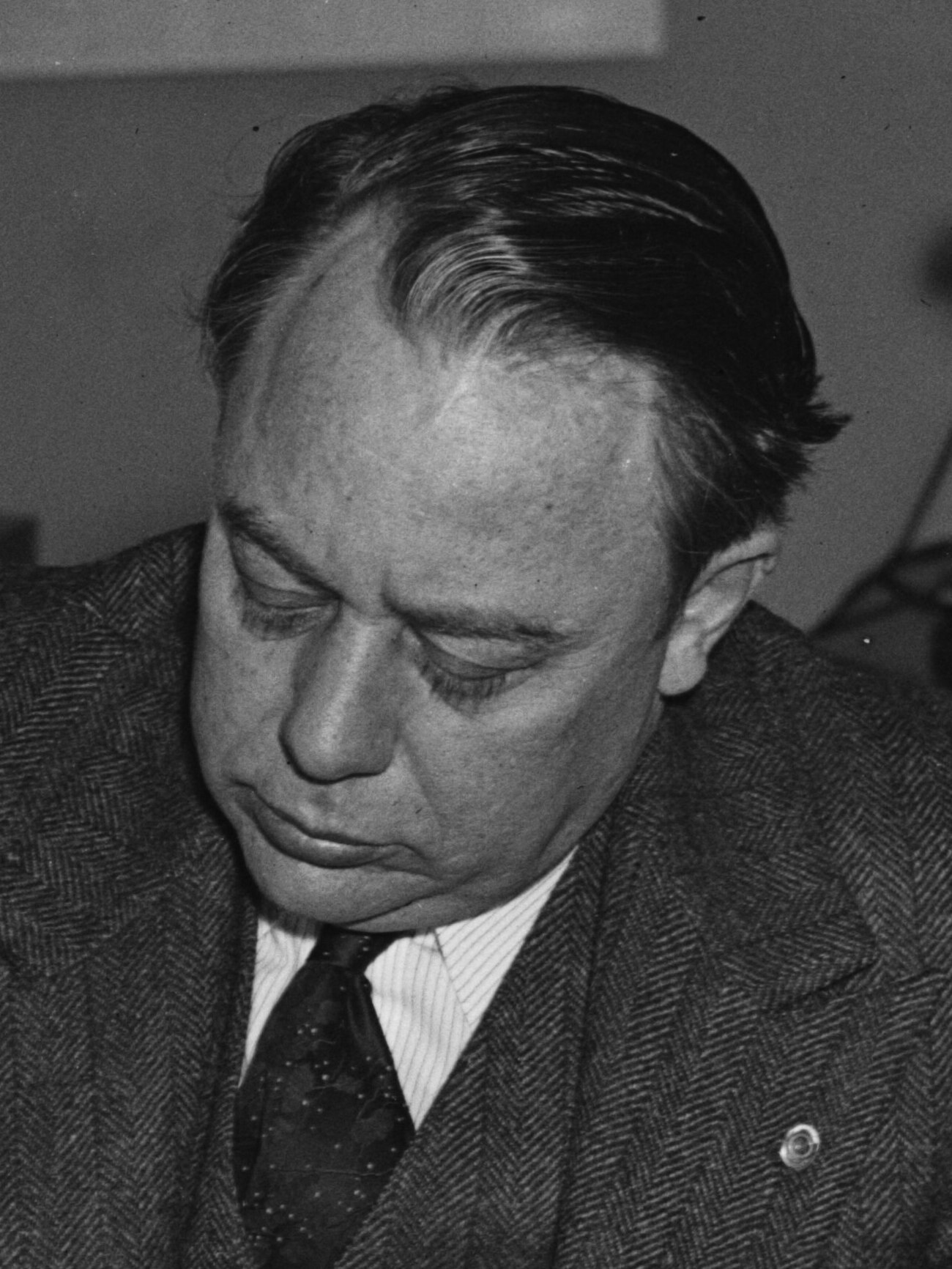
- Griswold in 1936

Member of the U.S. House of Representatives from Indiana
- In office March 4, 1931 – January 3, 1939
- Preceded by: Albert R. Hall (11th); Courtland C. Gillen (5th)
- Succeeded by: William Larrabee (11th); Forest Harness (5th)
- Constituency: 11th district (1931-33); 5th district (1933-39)

Personal details
- Born: January 20, 1890 New Haven, Missouri, U.S.
- Died: December 5, 1940 (aged 50) Peru, Indiana, U.S.
- Party: Democratic
- Education: Indiana Law School

Military service
- Allegiance: United States of America
- Branch/service: United States Army
- Rank: Private
- Unit: Company B, Fourth Regiment Casual Detachment
- Battles/wars: World War I

Glenn Hasenfratz Griswold (January 20, 1890 – December 5, 1940) was an American lawyer and politician who served four terms as a U.S. representative from Indiana from 1931 to 1939.

== Biography ==
Born in New Haven, Missouri, Griswold attended public schools. He moved to Peru, Indiana, in 1911. He attended Valparaiso (Indiana) Law School. He was admitted to the bar in 1917 and commenced practice in Peru, Indiana. During the First World War, he served in the United States Army as a private in Company B, Fourth Regiment Casual Detachment. After the war he became the city attorney of Peru, Indiana from 1921 to 1925. He served as prosecuting attorney of Miami County, Indiana, in 1925 and 1926. He served as a member of the Indiana Railroad Commission in 1930.

Griswold was elected as a Democrat to the Seventy-second and to the three succeeding Congresses (March 4, 1931 – January 3, 1939). He was an unsuccessful candidate for reelection in 1938 to the Seventy-sixth Congress. Thereafter, he returned to Peru, Indiana, to practice law until his death there on December 5, 1940. He was interred in Mount Hope Cemetery in Peru, Indiana.

U.S. House of Representatives
Preceded by Albert R. Hall	Member of the U.S. House of Representatives from Indiana's 11th congressional district 1931-1933	Succeeded by William Larrabee
Preceded by Courtland C. Gillen	Member of the U.S. House of Representatives from Indiana's 5th congressional district 1933-1939	Succeeded by Forest Harness
