= Indiana's 11th congressional district =

U.S. House district from 1853 to 1983

- Obsolete district
- Created: 1850
- Eliminated: 2000
- Years active: 1853–1983

Indiana's 11th congressional district was a congressional district for the United States House of Representatives in Indiana. In its final configuration, it covered most of the southern portion of Indianapolis. It was eliminated as a result of the redistricting cycle after the 1980 census.

It was last represented by Andrew Jacobs, Jr. After the 1980 census, most of its territory became the 10th district, and Jacobs transferred there.

== List of members representing the district ==
Member	Party	Years	Cong ress	Electoral history
District created March 4, 1853
Andrew J. Harlan (Marion)	Democratic	March 4, 1853 – March 3, 1855	33rd	Elected in 1852. Retired.
John U. Pettit (Wabash)	People's	March 4, 1855 – March 3, 1857	34th 35th 36th	Elected in 1854. Re-elected in 1856. Re-elected in 1858. Retired.
John U. Pettit (Wabash)	Republican	March 4, 1857 – March 3, 1861	34th 35th 36th	Elected in 1854. Re-elected in 1856. Re-elected in 1858. Retired.
John P. C. Shanks (Jay Court House)	Republican	March 4, 1861 – March 3, 1863	37th	Elected in 1860. Lost re-election.
James F. McDowell (Marion)	Democratic	March 4, 1863 – March 3, 1865	38th	Elected in 1862. Lost re-election.
Thomas N. Stilwell (Anderson)	Republican	March 4, 1865 – March 3, 1867	39th	Elected in 1864. Retired.
John P. C. Shanks (Jay Court House)	Republican	March 4, 1867 – March 3, 1869	40th	Elected in 1866. Redistricted to the 9th district.
Jasper Packard (Laporte)	Republican	March 4, 1869 – March 3, 1873	41st 42nd	Elected in 1868. Re-elected in 1870. Redistricted to the at-large district
District inactive		March 4, 1873 – March 3, 1875	43rd	
James L. Evans (Noblesville)	Republican	March 4, 1875 – March 3, 1879	44th 45th	Elected in 1874. Re-elected in 1876. Retired.
Calvin Cowgill (Wabash)	Republican	March 4, 1879 – March 3, 1881	46th	Elected in 1878. Retired.
George W. Steele (Marion)	Republican	March 4, 1881 – March 3, 1889	47th 48th 49th 50th	Elected in 1880. Re-elected in 1882. Re-elected in 1884. Re-elected in 1886. Lost re-election.
Augustus N. Martin (Bluffton)	Democratic	March 4, 1889 – March 3, 1895	51st 52nd 53rd	Elected in 1888. Re-elected in 1890. Re-elected in 1892. Lost re-election.
George W. Steele (Marion)	Republican	March 4, 1895 – March 3, 1903	54th 55th 56th 57th	Elected in 1894. Re-elected in 1896. Re-elected in 1898. Re-elected in 1900. Retired.
Frederick Landis (Logansport)	Republican	March 4, 1903 – March 3, 1907	58th 59th	Elected in 1902. Re-elected in 1904. Lost re-election.
George W. Rauch (Marion)	Democratic	March 4, 1907 – March 3, 1917	60th 61st 62nd 63rd 64th	Elected in 1906. Re-elected in 1908. Re-elected in 1910. Re-elected in 1912. Re-elected in 1914. Lost re-election.
Milton Kraus (Peru)	Republican	March 4, 1917 – March 3, 1923	65th 66th 67th	Elected in 1916. Re-elected in 1918. Re-elected in 1920. Lost re-election.
Samuel E. Cook (Huntington)	Democratic	March 4, 1923 – March 3, 1925	68th	Elected in 1922. Lost re-election.
Albert R. Hall (Marion)	Republican	March 4, 1925 – March 3, 1931	69th 70th 71st	Elected in 1924. Re-elected in 1926. Re-elected in 1928. Lost re-election.
Glenn Griswold (Peru)	Democratic	March 4, 1931 – March 3, 1933	72nd	Elected in 1930. Redistricted to the 5th district.
William Larrabee (New Palestine)	Democratic	March 4, 1933 – January 3, 1943	73rd 74th 75th 76th 77th	Redistricted from the 6th district and re-elected in 1932. Re-elected in 1934. Re-elected in 1936. Re-elected in 1938. Re-elected in 1940. Redistricted to the 10th district and lost re-election.
Louis Ludlow (Indianapolis)	Democratic	January 3, 1943 – January 3, 1949	78th 79th 80th	Redistricted from the 12th district and re-elected in 1942. Re-elected in 1944. Re-elected in 1946. Retired.
Andrew Jacobs Sr. (Indianapolis)	Democratic	January 3, 1949 – January 3, 1951	81st	Elected in 1948. Lost re-election.
Charles B. Brownson (Indianapolis)	Republican	January 3, 1951 – January 3, 1959	82nd 83rd 84th 85th	Elected in 1950. Re-elected in 1952. Re-elected in 1954. Re-elected in 1956. Lost re-election.
Joseph W. Barr (Indianapolis)	Democratic	January 3, 1959 – January 3, 1961	86th	Elected in 1958. Lost re-election.
Donald C. Bruce (Indianapolis)	Republican	January 3, 1961 – January 3, 1965	87th 88th	Elected in 1960. Re-elected in 1962. Retired to run for U.S. senator.
Andrew Jacobs Jr. (Indianapolis)	Democratic	January 3, 1965 – January 3, 1973	89th 90th 91st 92nd	Elected in 1964. Re-elected in 1966. Re-elected in 1968. Re-elected in 1970. Lost re-election.
William H. Hudnut III (Indianapolis)	Republican	January 3, 1973 – January 3, 1975	93rd	Elected in 1972. Lost re-election.
Andrew Jacobs Jr. (Indianapolis)	Democratic	January 3, 1975 – January 3, 1983	94th 95th 96th 97th	Elected in 1974. Re-elected in 1976. Re-elected in 1978. Re-elected in 1980. Redistricted to the 10th district.
District eliminated January 3, 1983
