= Daniel Mace (politician) =

American politician

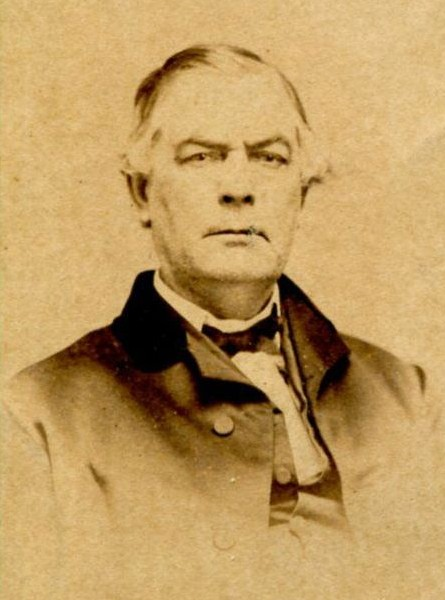

Member of the U.S. House of Representatives from Indiana's 8th district
- In office March 4, 1851 – March 3, 1857
- Preceded by: Joseph E. McDonald
- Succeeded by: James Wilson

Personal details
- Born: September 5, 1811 Pickaway County, Ohio, U.S.
- Died: July 26, 1867 (aged 55) Lafayette, Indiana, U.S
- Party: People's
- Other political affiliations: Democratic (before 1855)

Daniel Mace (September 5, 1811 – July 26, 1867) was a U.S. representative from Indiana.

Born in Pickaway County, Ohio, Mace attended the public schools. He studied law. He was admitted to the bar in 1835 and practiced in Lafayette, Indiana. He served as member of the state house of representatives in 1836. He served as clerk of the state house of representatives in 1837 and United States attorney for Indiana 1849–1853.

Mace was elected as a Democrat to the Thirty-second and Thirty-third Congresses (March 4, 1851 – March 3, 1855). He was re-elected as an Indiana People's Party candidate to the Thirty-fourth Congress (March 4, 1855 – March 3, 1857). He served as chairman of the Committee on the Post Office and Post Roads (Thirty-fourth Congress). He resumed the practice of law. He was the Postmaster of LaFayette from September 22, 1866, until his death in LaFayette, July 26, 1867. He was interred in Greenbush Cemetery.

U.S. House of Representatives
Preceded by Joseph E. McDonald	Member of the U.S. House of Representatives from Indiana's 8th congressional district March 4, 1851 – March 3, 1857	Succeeded by James Wilson
