= Calvin Cowgill =

American politician

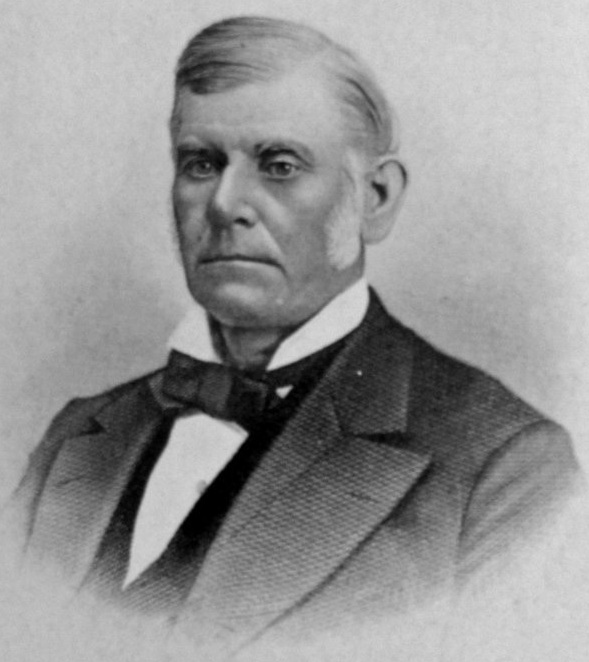
- From 1903's Biographical Memoirs of Wabash County, Indiana

Member of the U.S. House of Representatives from Indiana's 11th district
- In office March 4, 1879 – March 3, 1881
- Preceded by: James L. Evans
- Succeeded by: George W. Steele

Personal details
- Born: January 7, 1819 Clinton County, Ohio, U.S.
- Died: February 10, 1903 (aged 84) Wabash, Indiana, U.S
- Party: Republican

Calvin Cowgill (January 7, 1819 – February 10, 1903) was an American lawyer and politician who served one term as a U.S. representative from Indiana from 1879 to 1881.

== Biography ==
Born in Clinton County, Ohio, Cowgill attended the common schools. He moved with his parents to Indiana in 1836. He studied law in Winchester, Randolph County. He moved to Wabash County, Indiana, in 1846. He was admitted to the bar and commenced practice in Wabash. He served as member of the Indiana House of Representatives in 1851 and again during the special session of 1865. He served as treasurer of Wabash County 1855–1859, and provost marshal of the eleventh district of Indiana 1862–1865.

== Congress ==
Cowgill was elected as a Republican to the Forty-sixth Congress (March 4, 1879 – March 3, 1881). He was not a candidate for renomination in 1880 to the Forty-seventh Congress.

== Later career and death ==
He resumed the practice of his profession in Wabash, Indiana, where he died February 10, 1903. He was interred in Falls Cemetery.

U.S. House of Representatives
Preceded by James L. Evans	Member of the U.S. House of Representatives from Indiana's 11th congressional district 1879–1881	Succeeded by George W. Steele
