= Frederick Landis =

American politician from Indiana (1872–1934)

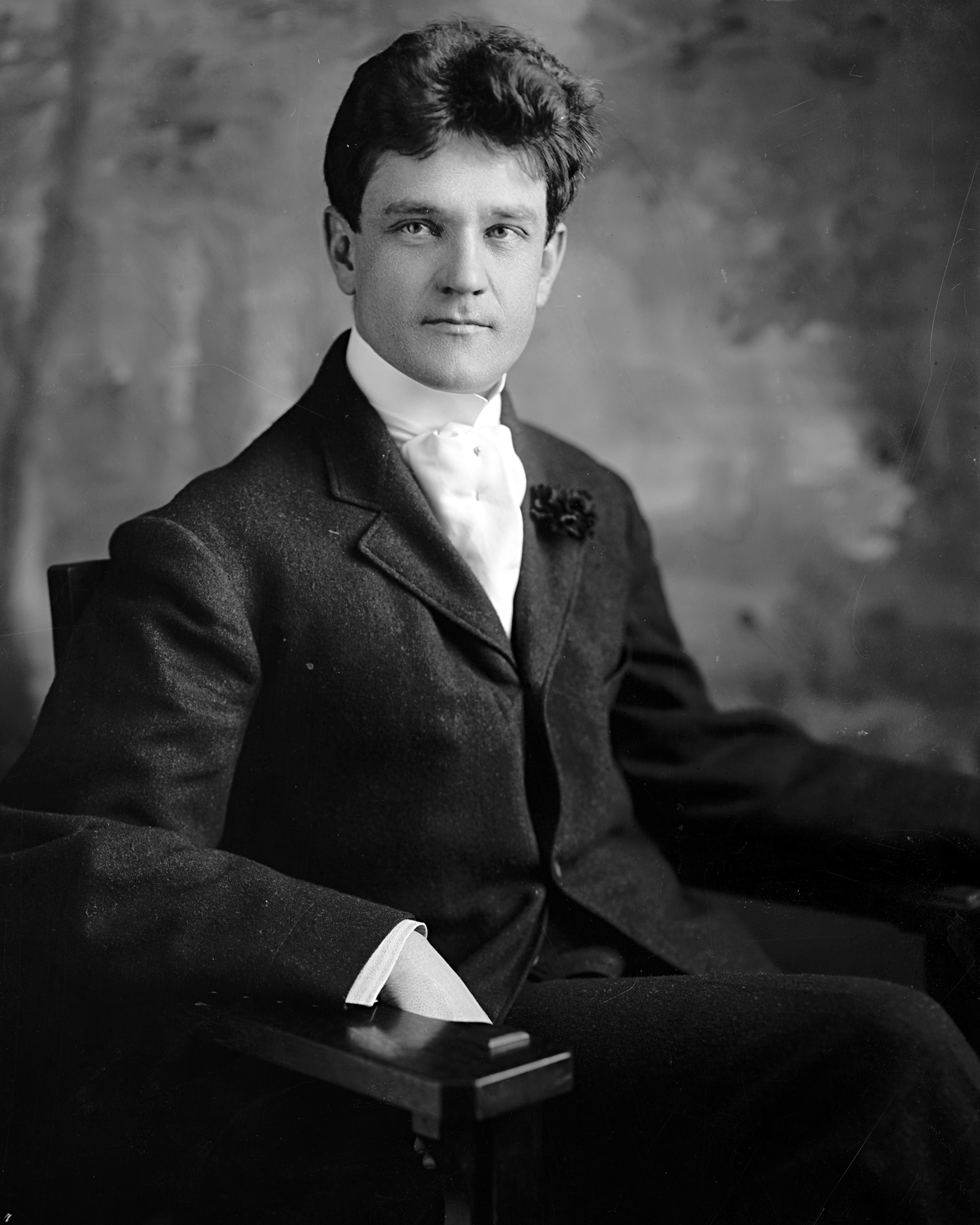

Member-elect of the U.S. House of Representatives from Indiana's 2nd district
- In office Died before assuming office
- Preceded by: George R. Durgan
- Succeeded by: Charles A. Halleck

Member of the U.S. House of Representatives from Indiana's 11th district
- In office March 4, 1903 – March 3, 1907
- Preceded by: George W. Steele
- Succeeded by: George W. Rauch

Personal details
- Born: August 18, 1872 Seven Mile, Ohio, U.S.
- Died: November 15, 1934 (aged 62) Logansport, Indiana, U.S.
- Resting place: Mount Hope Cemetery
- Party: Republican

Frederick Landis (August 18, 1872 – November 15, 1934) was an American lawyer, politician, author, and newspaper editor who served two terms as a U.S. representative from Indiana from 1903 to 1907.

He was a brother of both Charles Beary Landis, a newspaperman and U.S. representative, and Judge Kenesaw Mountain Landis, the first commissioner of baseball.

== Early life ==
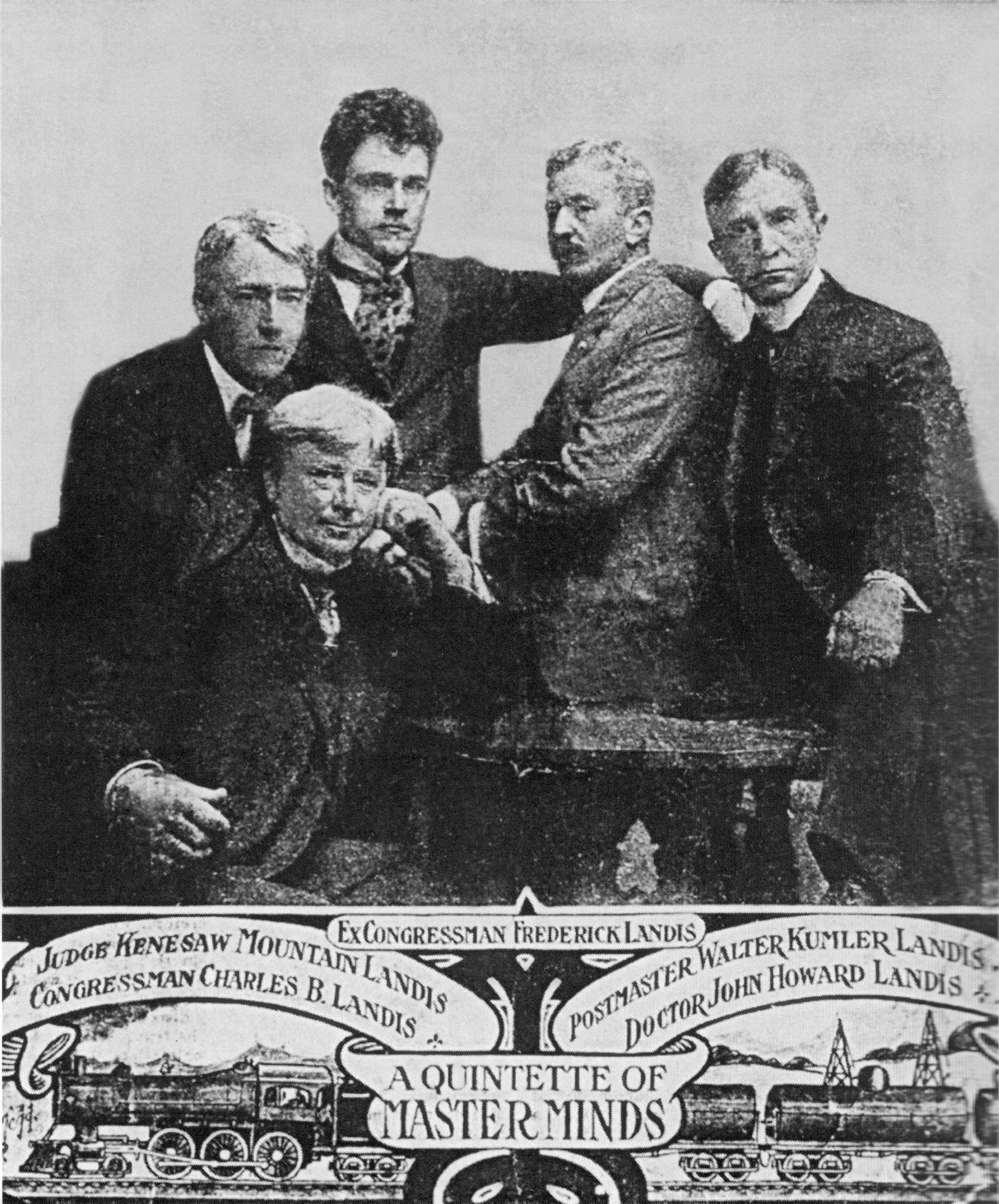
Photo of the Landis brothers in 1908

Born at Seven Mile, Ohio, Landis moved with his parents to Logansport, Indiana, in 1875. He attended the public schools. He was graduated from the law department of the University of Michigan at Ann Arbor in 1895. He was admitted to the bar the same year and commenced practice at Logansport, Indiana.

== Congress ==
Landis was elected as a Republican to the Fifty-eighth and Fifty-ninth Congresses (March 4, 1903 – March 3, 1907). He was an unsuccessful candidate for reelection in 1906 to the Sixtieth Congress.

== Later career as writer, newspaper editor, and death ==
He returned to Logansport and engaged in writing and lecturing. He was one of the organizers of the Progressive Party in 1912 and temporary chairman of its first State convention in Indiana.

He served as a delegate to the National Progressive Convention at Chicago in 1912. He was an unsuccessful candidate for governor on the Progressive ticket in 1912. He was an unsuccessful candidate for the nomination for governor on the Republican ticket in 1928. He was an author and lecturer.

He wrote Glory of His Country about a man infiltrating the Copperheads published in 1910. It was adapted by Augustus Thomas into the play The Copperhead: A Story in Four Acts. In 1920 Lionel Barrymore starred in the successful film version The Copperhead.

He also wrote Angel of Lonesome Hill and edited the Logansport Pharos Tribune as well as The Hoosier Editor.

A print was made depicting his "farm residence".

== Election return and death ==
Landis was elected to the Seventy-fourth Congress on November 6, 1934, but died in a hospital in Logansport, Indiana, November 15, 1934, before Congress had convened.

He was interred in Mount Hope Cemetery.

== Writings ==
- The Glory of His Country
- The Angel of Lonesome Hill, A Story of a President (1910)
- Days Gone Dry (1919) with cartoons by Gaar Williams about prohibition

U.S. House of Representatives
Preceded by George W. Steele	Member of the U.S. House of Representatives from Indiana's 11th congressional district March 4, 1903 – March 3, 1907	Succeeded by George W. Rauch
