= Milton Kraus =

American politician

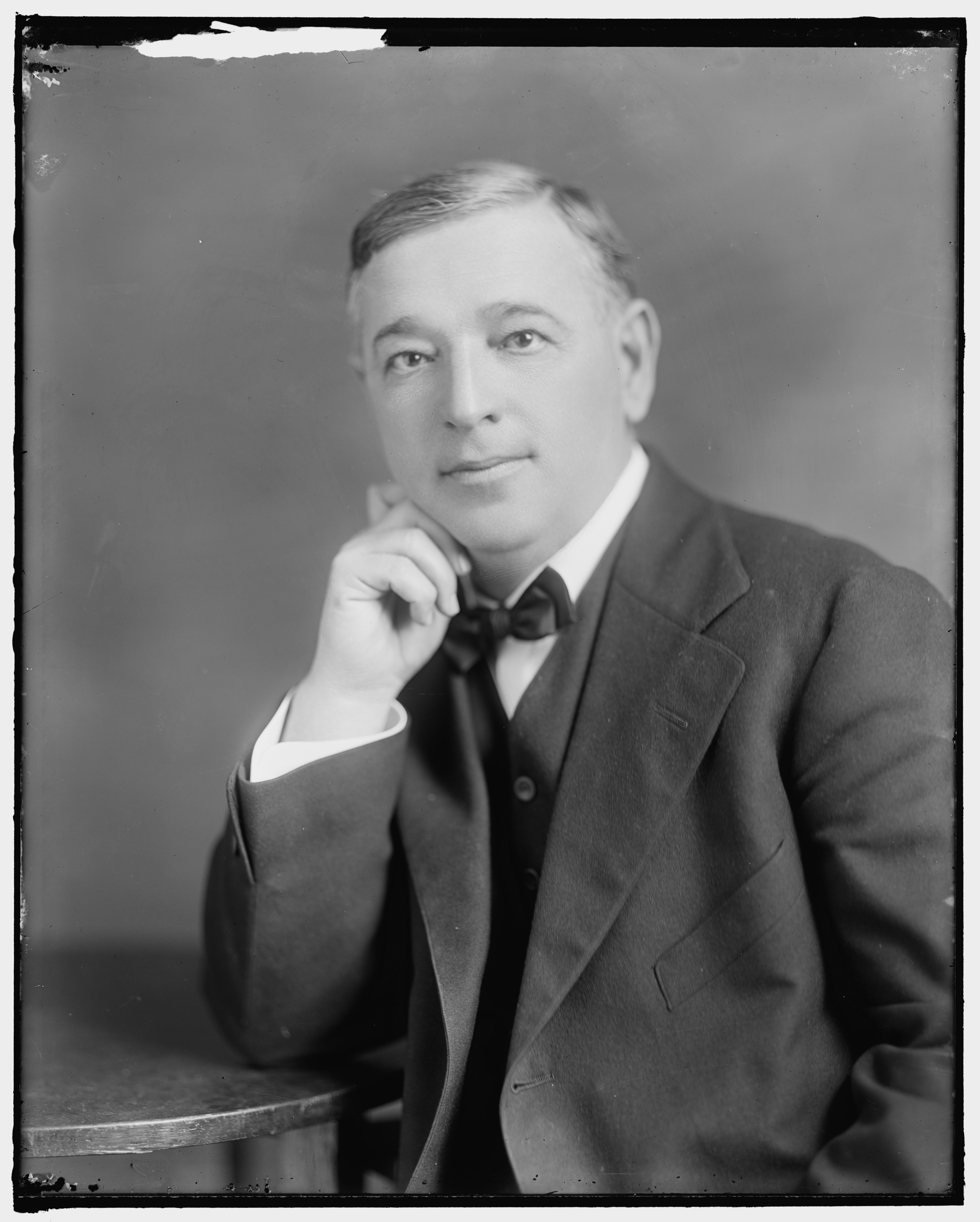

Member of the U.S. House of Representatives from Indiana's 11th district
- In office March 4, 1917 – March 3, 1923
- Preceded by: George W. Rauch
- Succeeded by: Samuel E. Cook

Personal details
- Born: June 26, 1866 Kokomo, Indiana, U.S.
- Died: November 18, 1942 (aged 76) Wabash, Indiana, U.S
- Party: Republican
- Education: University of Michigan

Milton Kraus (June 26, 1866 – November 18, 1942) was an American lawyer and politician who served three terms as a U.S. representative from Indiana from 1917 to 1923.

== Biography ==
Born in Kokomo, Indiana to German-Jewish parents, Kraus attended the common and high schools. He was graduated from the law department of the University of Michigan at Ann Arbor in 1886. He was admitted to the bar in 1887 and commenced practice in Peru, Indiana. He organized a company of volunteers for the Spanish–American War.

=== Political career ===
He was a presidential elector in the 1908 presidential election.

Kraus was elected as a Republican to the Sixty-fifth, Sixty-sixth, and Sixty-seventh Congresses (March 4, 1917 – March 3, 1923). He was an unsuccessful candidate for reelection in 1922 to the Sixty-eighth Congress.

=== Later career and death ===
He resumed manufacturing activities. He died in Wabash, Indiana, November 18, 1942. He was interred in Mount Hope Cemetery, Peru, Indiana.

== See also ==
- List of Jewish members of the United States Congress

U.S. House of Representatives
Preceded by George W. Rauch	Member of the U.S. House of Representatives from Indiana's 11th congressional district 1917–1923	Succeeded by Samuel E. Cook
