= Albert R. Hall (Indiana politician) =

American politician (1884–1969)

Albert Hall
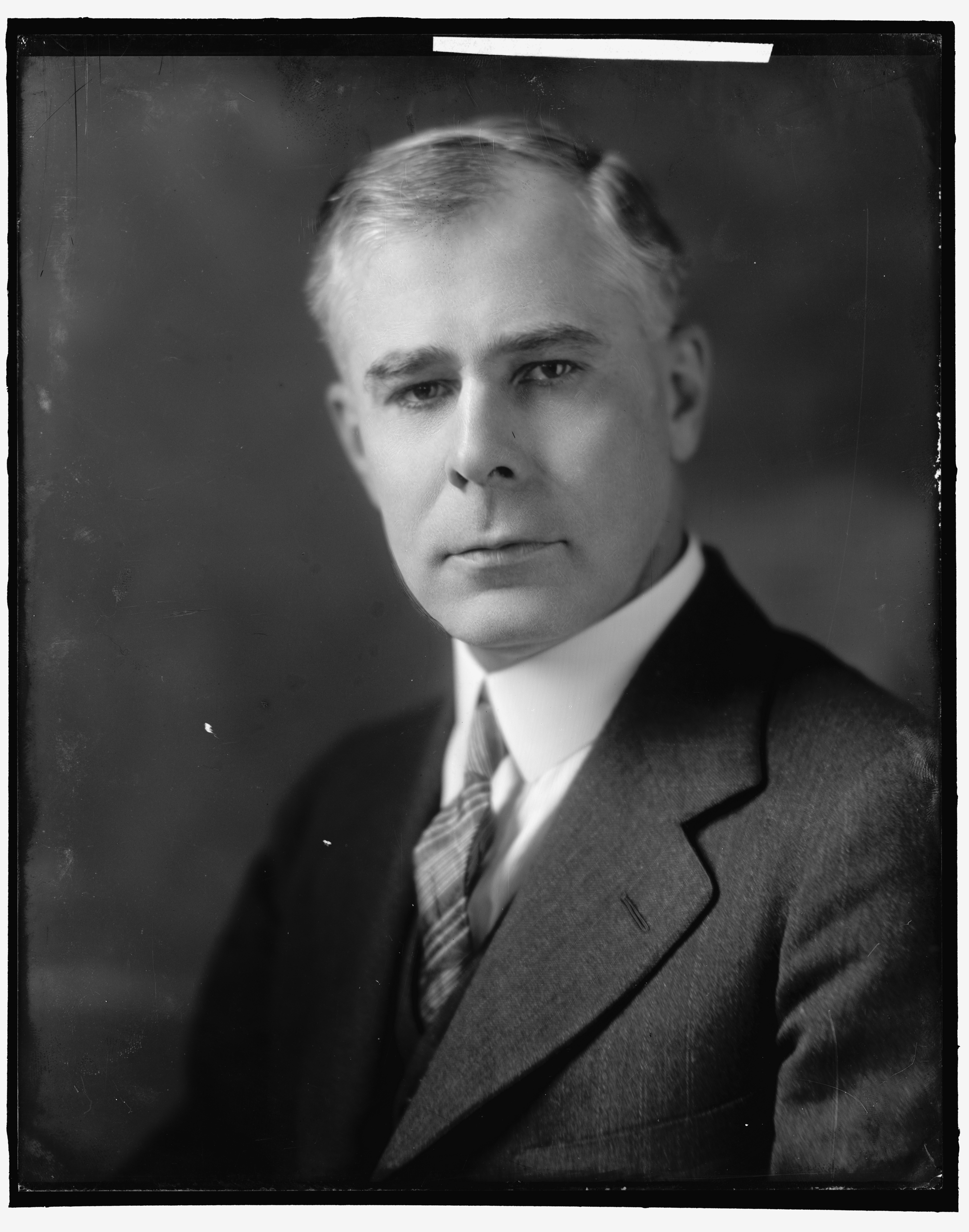

Member of the U.S. House of Representatives from Indiana's 11th district
- In office March 4, 1925 – March 3, 1931
- Preceded by: Samuel E. Cook
- Succeeded by: Glenn Griswold

Personal details
- Born: Albert Richardson Hall; August 27, 1884 West Baden Springs, Indiana, U.S.
- Died: November 29, 1969 (aged 85) Marion, Indiana, U.S.

Albert Richardson Hall (August 27, 1884 – November 29, 1969) was an American educator and politician who served three terms as a U.S. representative from Indiana from 1925 to 1931.

== Early life ==
Hall was born near West Baden Springs, Indiana, Hall attended the district school and the Paoli (Indiana) High School. He graduated from Indiana Central Business College (now the University of Indianapolis) at Indianapolis in 1906 and from Earlham College, Richmond, Indiana, in 1912. He served as principal of the high school at French Lick, Indiana from 1909 to 1911, superintendent of schools of Fairmount from 1913 to 1917, of Waterloo in 1917 and 1918, and of Grant County 1921–1925.

== Political career ==
Hall was elected as a Republican to the Sixty-ninth, Seventieth, and Seventy-first Congresses (March 4, 1925 – March 3, 1931). He was an unsuccessful candidate for reelection in 1930 to the Seventy-second Congress and for election in 1934 to the Seventy-fourth Congress.

== After Congress ==
Hall engaged in commercial printing from 1932 to 1942, and served as secretary and treasurer of Driveways Contractors, Inc. He engaged in the real estate business in Marion, Indiana, was editor of a Fairmount, Indiana newspaper, and operator of Indiana Hotel in Marion, Indiana, from 1961 until his death in Marion on November 29, 1969.

He was interred in the I.O.O.F. Cemetery.

U.S. House of Representatives
Preceded by Samuel E. Cook	Member of the U.S. House of Representatives from Indiana's 11th congressional district 1925–1931	Succeeded by Glenn Griswold
