= Stillwell, Ohio =

Unincorporated community in Ohio, U.S.

Coordinates: 40°27′38″N 82°05′40″W

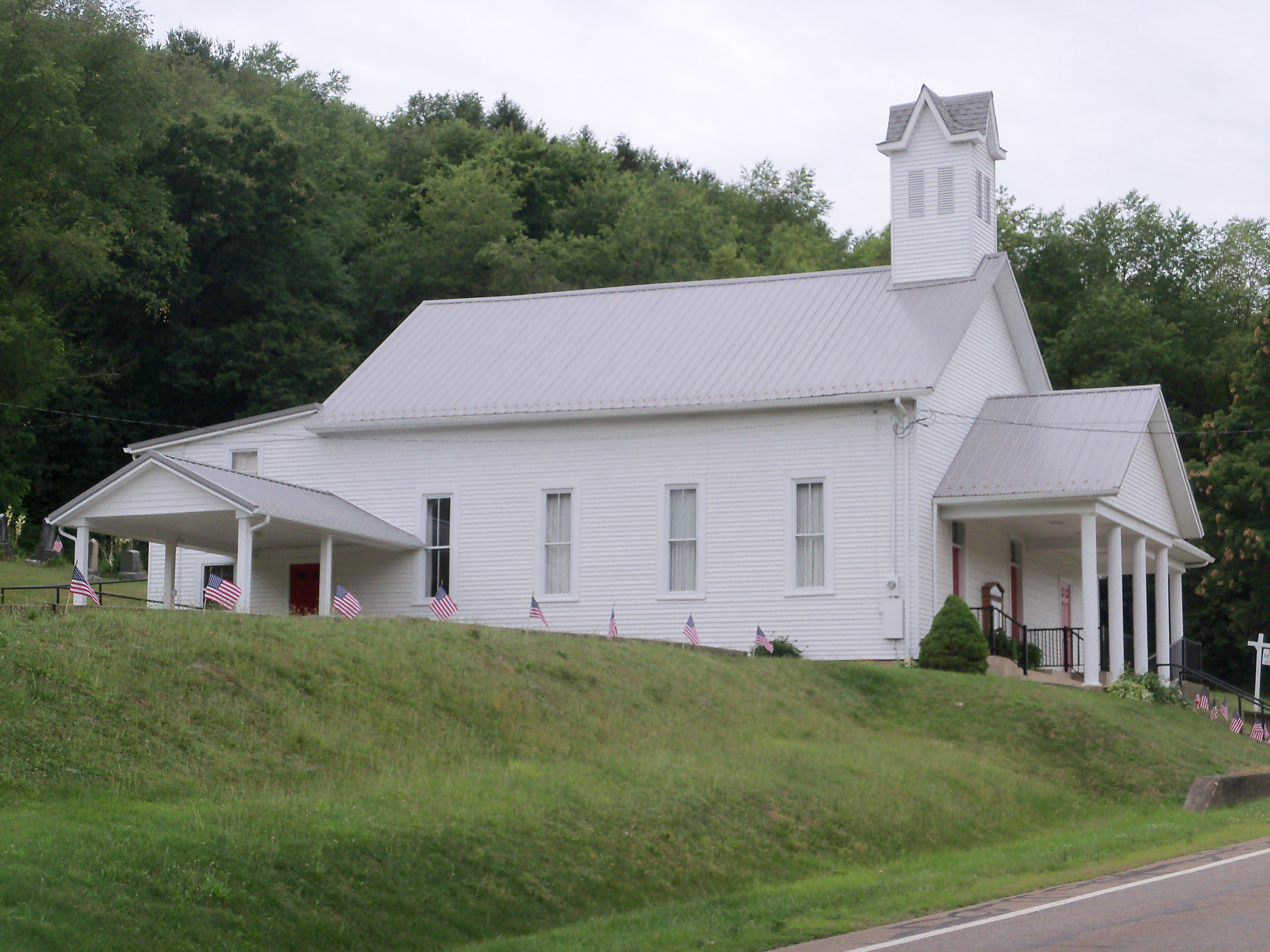
Wolfcreek Baptist Church in Stillwell

Stillwell is an unincorporated community in southern Richland Township, Holmes County, Ohio, United States. Historical Stillwell Cemetery on Route 62 contains graves of early settlers, many of which farmed and logged the area.
