= Courtland C. Gillen =

American politician (1880–1954)

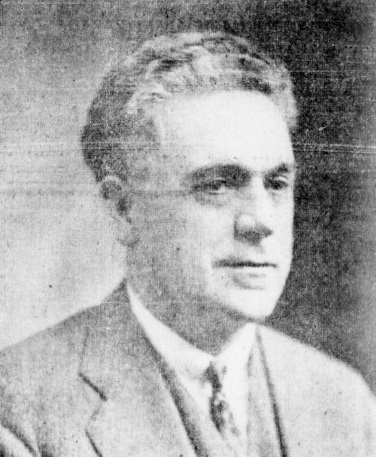
- Gillen in 1930

Member of the U.S. House of Representatives from Indiana's 5th district
- In office March 4, 1931 – March 3, 1933
- Preceded by: Noble J. Johnson
- Succeeded by: Glenn Griswold

Personal details
- Born: July 3, 1880 Roachdale, Indiana, U.S.
- Died: September 1, 1954 (aged 74) Greencastle, Indiana, U.S.
- Resting place: Forest Hill Cemetery; Greencastle, Indiana, .S.
- Party: Democratic
- Education: De Pauw University; Indiana University Robert H. McKinney School of Law

Courtland Craig Gillen (July 3, 1880 – September 1, 1954) was an American lawyer and jurist who served one term as a U.S. representative from Indiana from 1931 to 1933.

== Biography ==
Courtland Craig Gillen was born on July 3, 1880, in Roachdale, Indiana. Gillen attended the rural schools. After graduating from Fincastle High School in 1897. He taught at common schools and a high school from 1897 to 1904. From 1901 to 1903, he attended De Pauw University at Greencastle, Indiana and later graduated from the law of department of the predecessor of what is now known as the Indiana University Robert H. McKinney School of Law in 1905. In 1904 he was admitted to the bar.

== Career ==
Gillen commenced a law practice in Greencastle, Indiana. He later served as county attorney from 1909 to 1914, and as a prosecuting attorney of the sixty-fourth judicial circuit in 1917 and 1918. He also served as delegate to the Democratic State convention in 1924. He was a member of the Gillen & Lyon law firm.

=== Congress ===
Gillen was elected as a Democrat to the Seventy-second Congress (March 4, 1931 – March 3, 1933). He was an unsuccessful candidate for renomination in 1932.

=== Later career ===
Gillen was elected judge of the sixty-fourth judicial circuit (Putnam Circuit Court) in 1934 and served from January 1, 1935, until his resignation on April 15, 1939. After, he resumed the private practice of law.

== Personal life ==
Gillen married and had three children, Mary Elizabeth, Rachel and Wayne.

Gillen died on September 1, 1954, in Greencastle, Indiana. He was interred in Forest Hill Cemetery in Greencastle.

U.S. House of Representatives
Preceded by Noble J. Johnson	Member of the U.S. House of Representatives from Indiana's 5th congressional district 1931-1933	Succeeded by Glenn Griswold
