= 1926 United States House of Representatives elections =

House elections for the 70th U.S. Congress

- November 2, 1926

All 435 seats in the United States House of Representatives 218 seats needed for a majority
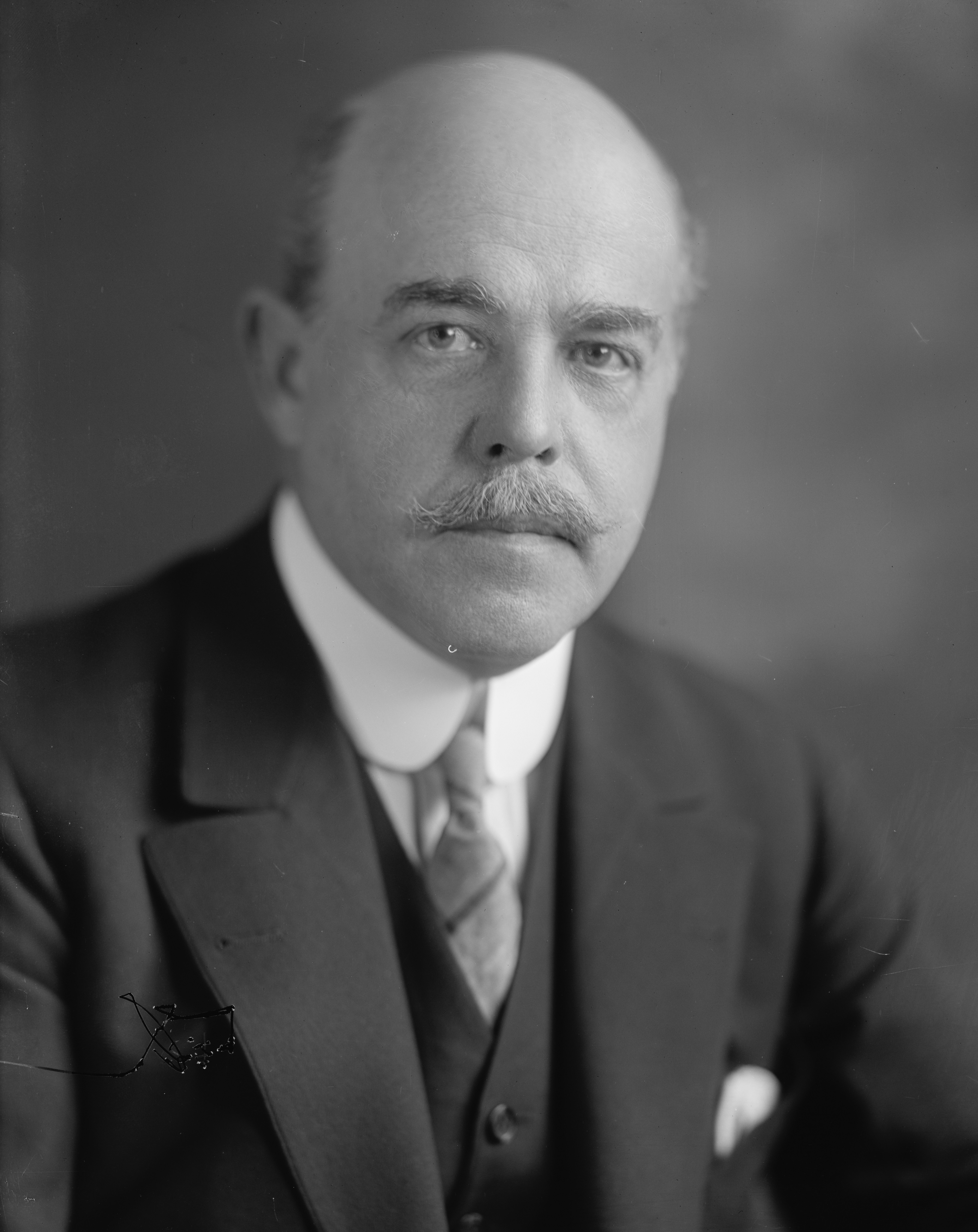

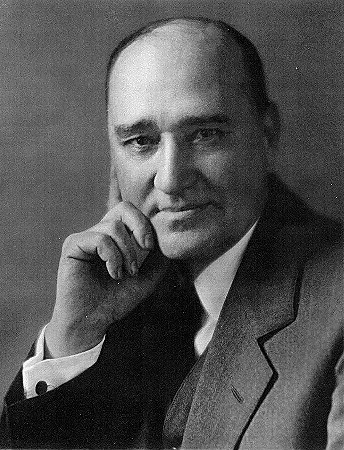
	Majority party	Minority party
Leader	Nicholas Longworth	Finis J. Garrett
Party	Republican	Democratic
Leader since	March 4, 1923	March 4, 1923
Leader's seat	Ohio 1st	Tennessee 9th
Last election	246 seats	183 seats
Seats won	238	194
Seat change	▼8	▲11
Popular vote	11,628,536	8,163,000
Percentage	57.11%	40.09%
Swing	▲1.05pp	▼0.13pp
	Third party	Fourth party
Party	Farmer–Labor	Socialist
Last election	3 seats	2 seats
Seats won	2	1
Seat change	▼1	▼1
Popular vote	223,395	182,308
Percentage	1.10%	0.90%
Swing	▼0.28pp	▼0.28pp
- Democratic hold Democratic gain Republican hold Republican gain Farmer–Labor hold Socialist hold
Speaker before election
Nicholas Longworth
Republican
Elected Speaker
Nicholas Longworth
Republican

The 1926 United States House of Representatives elections were elections for the United States House of Representatives to elect members to serve in the 70th United States Congress. They were held for the most part on November 2, 1926, while Maine held theirs on September 13. They occurred in the middle of President Calvin Coolidge's second term.

Coolidge's Republican Party lost seats to the opposition Democratic Party, but it retained a majority. The most pressing national matters at the time were fragmented, generally related to government's relationship to business or to providing social aid. However, no predominant issue was able to cast a shadow over the election. The small, populist Farmer–Labor Party also held two seats following the election.

== Overall results ==
↓
194	3	238
Democratic	(Note: Socialists had 1 seat and Farmer–Labor had 2 seats.)	Republican

Source: "Election Statistics – Office of the Clerk".

House seats
Democratic	44.60%
Farmer–Labor	0.46%
Republican	54.71%
Socialist	0.23%

1926 House results, shaded by winning candidates share of vote

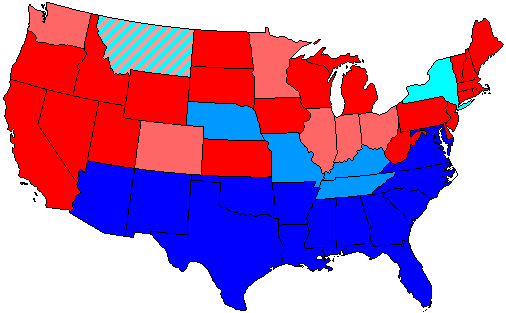
House seats by party holding plurality in state: 80+% Democratic / 80+% Republican; 60+% to 80% Democratic / 60+% to 80% Republican; Up to 60% Democratic / Up to 60% Republican

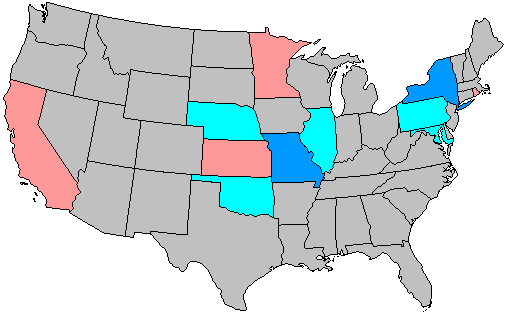
6+ Democratic gain / 6+ Republican gain; 3-5 Democratic gain / 3-5 Republican gain; 1-2 Democratic gain / 1-2 Republican gain; no net change

== Special elections ==
Elections are listed by date and district.

District	Incumbent			This race	
District	Member	Party	First elected	Results	Candidates
Kentucky 10	John W. Langley	Republican	1906	Incumbent resigned January 11, 1926. New member elected February 13, 1926. Republican hold.	▌ ✓ Andrew Jackson Kirk (Republican) 60.65%; ▌J. C. Cantrell (Democratic) 39.35%
California 2	John E. Raker	Democratic	1910	Incumbent died January 22, 1926. New member elected August 31, 1926. Republican gain.	▌ ✓ Harry Lane Englebright (Republican) 26.03%; ▌Frank J. Powers (Republican) 23.25%; ▌Fred G. Stevens (Republican) 19.90%; ▌Marshall De Motte (Republican) 18.17%; ▌Robert H. De Witt (Democratic) 12.65%
California 5	Lawrence J. Flaherty	Republican	1924	Incumbent died June 13, 1926. New member elected August 31, 1926. Republican hold.	▌ ✓ Richard J. Welch (Republican) 80.25%; ▌W. Estees von Krakau (Independent) 19.75%
Massachusetts 8	Harry Irving Thayer	Republican	1924	Incumbent died March 10, 1926. New member elected November 2, 1926. Republican hold.	▌ ✓ Frederick W. Dallinger (Republican) 64.35%; ▌John P. Brennan (Democratic) 35.65%
Missouri 11	Harry B. Hawes	Democratic	1920	Incumbent resigned October 15, 1926 to run for U.S. senator. New member elected November 2, 1926. Democratic hold.	▌ ✓ John J. Cochran (Democratic) 52.82%; ▌Henri Chouteau (Republican) 47.18%

== Alabama ==
District	Incumbent			This race	
District	Member	Party	First elected	Results	Candidates
Alabama 1	John McDuffie	Democratic	1918	Incumbent re-elected.	▌ ✓ John McDuffie (Democratic) 84.0%; ▌Aubrey Boyles (Republican) 16.0%
Alabama 2	J. Lister Hill	Democratic	1923 (special)	Incumbent re-elected.	▌ ✓ J. Lister Hill (Democratic); Uncontested
Alabama 3	Henry B. Steagall	Democratic	1914	Incumbent re-elected.	▌ ✓ Henry B. Steagall (Democratic) 94.6%; ▌Carlos E. Roberts (Republican) 5.4%
Alabama 4	Lamar Jeffers	Democratic	1921 (special)	Incumbent re-elected.	▌ ✓ Lamar Jeffers (Democratic) 68.1%; ▌Omar H. Reynolds (Republican) 31.9%
Alabama 5	William B. Bowling	Democratic	1920	Incumbent re-elected.	▌ ✓ William B. Bowling (Democratic) 88.4%; ▌John A. Alexander (Republican) 11.6%
Alabama 6	William B. Oliver	Democratic	1914	Incumbent re-elected.	▌ ✓ William B. Oliver (Democratic) 99.0%; ▌C. M. Ayers (Republican) 1.0%
Alabama 7	Miles C. Allgood	Democratic	1922	Incumbent re-elected.	▌ ✓ Miles C. Allgood (Democratic) 64.7%; ▌John J. Stephens (Republican) 35.3%
Alabama 8	Edward B. Almon	Democratic	1914	Incumbent re-elected.	▌ ✓ Edward B. Almon (Democratic) 90.1%; ▌Robert M. Sims (Republican) 9.9%
Alabama 9	George Huddleston	Democratic	1914	Incumbent re-elected.	▌ ✓ George Huddleston (Democratic) 94.4%; ▌Frank H. Lathrop (Republican) 5.6%
Alabama 10	William B. Bankhead	Democratic	1916	Incumbent re-elected.	▌ ✓ William B. Bankhead (Democratic); Uncontested

== Arizona ==
Results by county Douglas: 50–60% 60–70% 70–80% 80–90%

District	Incumbent			This race	
District	Member	Party	First elected	Results	Candidates
Arizona at-large	Carl Hayden	Democratic	1911	Retired to run for U.S. senator. Democratic hold.	▌ ✓ Lewis W. Douglas (Democratic) 64.1%; ▌Otis J. Baughn (Republican) 35.9%

== Arkansas ==
District	Incumbent			This race	
District	Member	Party	First elected	Results	Candidates
Arkansas 1	William J. Driver	Democratic	1920	Incumbent re-elected.	▌ ✓ William J. Driver (Democratic); Uncontested
Arkansas 2	William A. Oldfield	Democratic	1908	Incumbent re-elected.	▌ ✓ William A. Oldfield (Democratic) 78.7%; ▌J. L. McKamey (Republican) 21.3%
Arkansas 3	John N. Tillman	Democratic	1914	Incumbent re-elected.	▌ ✓ John N. Tillman (Democratic) 64.4%; ▌Hardy Kuy Kendall (Republican) 35.6%
Arkansas 4	Otis Wingo	Democratic	1912	Incumbent re-elected.	▌ ✓ Otis Wingo (Democratic); Uncontested
Arkansas 5	Heartsill Ragon	Democratic	1922	Incumbent re-elected.	▌ ✓ Heartsill Ragon (Democratic) 88.2%; ▌Harry M. Williams (Republican) 11.8%
Arkansas 6	James B. Reed	Democratic	1923	Incumbent re-elected.	▌ ✓ James B. Reed (Democratic); Uncontested
Arkansas 7	Tilman B. Parks	Democratic	1920	Incumbent re-elected.	▌ ✓ Tilman B. Parks (Democratic); Uncontested

== California ==
District	Incumbent			This race	
District	Member	Party	First elected	Results	Candidates
California 1	Clarence F. Lea	Democratic	1916	Incumbent re-elected.	▌ ✓ Clarence F. Lea (Democratic); Uncontested
California 2	Harry L. Englebright	Republican	1926 (special)	Incumbent re-elected.	▌ ✓ Harry L. Englebright (Republican); Uncontested
California 3	Charles F. Curry	Republican	1912	Incumbent re-elected.	▌ ✓ Charles F. Curry (Republican); Uncontested
California 4	Florence Prag Kahn	Republican	1925 (special)	Incumbent re-elected.	▌ ✓ Florence Prag Kahn (Republican) 63.8%; ▌Chauncey F. Tramutolo (Democratic) 31.1%; ▌William McDevitt (Socialist) 5.1%
California 5	Richard J. Welch	Republican	1926 (special)	Incumbent re-elected.	▌ ✓ Richard J. Welch (Republican); Uncontested
California 6	Albert E. Carter	Republican	1924	Incumbent re-elected.	▌ ✓ Albert E. Carter (Republican); Uncontested
California 7	Henry E. Barbour	Republican	1918	Incumbent re-elected.	▌ ✓ Henry E. Barbour (Republican); Uncontested
California 8	Arthur M. Free	Republican	1920	Incumbent re-elected.	▌ ✓ Arthur M. Free (Republican) 67.7%; ▌Philip G. Sheehy (Democratic) 32.3%
California 9	Walter F. Lineberger	Republican	1921 (special)	Incumbent retired to run for U.S. senator. Republican hold.	▌ ✓ William E. Evans (Republican) 59.5%; ▌Charles H. Randall (D-Prohibition) 35.9%; ▌Charles F. Conley (Socialist) 4.6%
California 10	John D. Fredericks	Republican	1923 (special)	Incumbent retired. Republican hold.	▌ ✓ Joe Crail (Republican) 86.8%; ▌N. Jackson Wright (Socialist) 13.2%
California 11	Philip D. Swing	Republican	1920	Incumbent re-elected.	▌ ✓ Philip D. Swing (Republican); Uncontested

== Colorado ==
District	Incumbent			This race	
District	Member	Party	First elected	Results	Candidates
Colorado 1	William N. Vaile	Republican	1918	Incumbent re-elected.	▌ ✓ William N. Vaile (Republican) 54.9%; ▌Benjamin Hilliard (Democratic) 41.7%; ▌Isaac Dunn (Farmer–Labor) 2.7%; ▌Clyde Robinson (Socialist) 0.7%
Colorado 2	Charles B. Timberlake	Republican	1914	Incumbent re-elected.	▌ ✓ Charles B. Timberlake (Republican) 66.5%; ▌William B. Washburn (Democratic) 33.5%
Colorado 3	Guy U. Hardy	Republican	1918	Incumbent re-elected.	▌ ✓ Guy U. Hardy (Republican) 54.0%; ▌Edmond I. Crockett (Democratic) 46.0%
Colorado 4	Edward T. Taylor	Democratic	1908	Incumbent re-elected.	▌ ✓ Edward T. Taylor (Democratic) 66.7%; ▌Webster S. Whinnery (Republican) 33.3%

== Connecticut ==
District	Incumbent			This race	
District	Member	Party	First elected	Results	Candidates
Connecticut 1	E. Hart Fenn	Republican	1920	Incumbent re-elected.	▌ ✓ E. Hart Fenn (Republican) 63.0%; ▌Henry J. Calnen (Democratic) 36.0%; ▌Fred M. Mansur (Socialist) 1.0%
Connecticut 2	Richard P. Freeman	Republican	1914	Incumbent re-elected.	▌ ✓ Richard P. Freeman (Republican) 61.7%; ▌Hermon J. Gibbs (Democratic) 37.5%; ▌Albert Boardman (Socialist) 0.8%
Connecticut 3	John Q. Tilson	Republican	1914	Incumbent re-elected.	▌ ✓ John Q. Tilson (Republican) 65.6%; ▌John E. Doughan (Democratic) 33.2%; ▌Martin F. Plunkett (Socialist) 1.2%
Connecticut 4	Schuyler Merritt	Republican	1916	Incumbent re-elected.	▌ ✓ Schuyler Merritt (Republican) 68.4%; ▌John Held Jr. (Democratic) 30.2%; ▌George R. Moffatt (Socialist) 1.5%
Connecticut 5	James P. Glynn	Republican	1924	Incumbent re-elected.	▌ ✓ James P. Glynn (Republican) 58.5%; ▌Arthur F. O'Leary (Democratic) 41.5%

== Delaware ==
District	Incumbent			This race	
District	Member	Party	First elected	Results	Candidates
Delaware at-large	Robert G. Houston	Republican	1924	Incumbent re-elected.	▌ ✓ Robert G. Houston (Republican) 56.9%; ▌Merrill H. Tilghman (Democratic) 43.1%

== Florida ==
District	Incumbent			This race	
District	Member	Party	First elected	Results	Candidates
Florida 1	Herbert J. Drane	Democratic	1916	Incumbent re-elected.	▌ ✓ Herbert J. Drane (Democratic) 72.7%; ▌Ora E. Chapin (Republican) 27.3%
Florida 2	Robert A. Green	Democratic	1924	Incumbent re-elected.	▌ ✓ Robert A. Green (Democratic) 86.2%; ▌A. F. Knotts (Republican) 13.8%
Florida 3	John H. Smithwick	Democratic	1918	Incumbent lost renomination. Democratic hold.	▌ ✓ Tom Yon (Democratic) 86.8%; ▌J. H. Drummond (Republican) 13.2%
Florida 4	William J. Sears	Democratic	1914	Incumbent re-elected.	▌ ✓ William J. Sears (Democratic) 73.6%; ▌W. C. Lawson (Republican) 15.9%; ▌E. D. Housholder (Republican) 10.5%

== Georgia ==
District	Incumbent			This race	
District	Member	Party	First elected	Results	Candidates
Georgia 1	Charles G. Edwards	Democratic	1924	Incumbent re-elected.	▌ ✓ Charles G. Edwards (Democratic); Uncontested
Georgia 2	E. Eugene Cox	Democratic	1924	Incumbent re-elected.	▌ ✓ E. Eugene Cox (Democratic); Uncontested
Georgia 3	Charles R. Crisp	Democratic	1912	Incumbent re-elected.	▌ ✓ Charles R. Crisp (Democratic); Uncontested
Georgia 4	William C. Wright	Democratic	1918	Incumbent re-elected.	▌ ✓ William C. Wright (Democratic); Uncontested
Georgia 5	William D. Upshaw	Democratic	1918	Incumbent lost renomination. Democratic hold.	▌ ✓ Leslie J. Steele (Democratic); Uncontested
Georgia 6	Samuel Rutherford	Democratic	1924	Incumbent re-elected.	▌ ✓ Samuel Rutherford (Democratic); Uncontested
Georgia 7	Gordon Lee	Democratic	1904	Incumbent retired. Democratic hold.	▌ ✓ Malcolm C. Tarver (Democratic); Uncontested
Georgia 8	Charles H. Brand	Democratic	1916	Incumbent re-elected.	▌ ✓ Charles H. Brand (Democratic); Uncontested
Georgia 9	Thomas M. Bell	Democratic	1904	Incumbent re-elected.	▌ ✓ Thomas M. Bell (Democratic); Uncontested
Georgia 10	Carl Vinson	Democratic	1914	Incumbent re-elected.	▌ ✓ Carl Vinson (Democratic); Uncontested
Georgia 11	William C. Lankford	Democratic	1918	Incumbent re-elected.	▌ ✓ William C. Lankford (Democratic); Uncontested
Georgia 12	William W. Larsen	Democratic	1916	Incumbent re-elected.	▌ ✓ William W. Larsen (Democratic); Uncontested

== Idaho ==
District	Incumbent			This race	
District	Member	Party	First elected	Results	Candidates
Idaho 1	Burton L. French	Republican	1916	Incumbent re-elected.	▌ ✓ Burton L. French (Republican) 66.3%; ▌L. L. Burtenshaw (Democratic) 33.7%
Idaho 2	Addison T. Smith	Republican	1912	Incumbent re-elected.	▌ ✓ Addison T. Smith (Republican) 60.6%; ▌H. F. Fait (Progressive) 22.7%; ▌Mary George Gray (Democratic) 16.7%

== Illinois ==
District	Incumbent			This race	
District	Member	Party	First elected	Results	Candidates
Illinois 1	Martin B. Madden	Republican	1904	Incumbent re-elected.	▌ ✓ Martin B. Madden (Republican) 68.2%; ▌James F. Doyle (Democratic) 31.5%; ▌G. Victor Cools (Progressive) 0.3%
Illinois 2	Morton D. Hull	Republican	1923	Incumbent re-elected.	▌ ✓ Morton D. Hull (Republican) 65.5%; ▌Michael C. Walsh (Democratic) 34.2%; ▌Natalie Schretler (Progressive) 0.3%
Illinois 3	Elliott W. Sproul	Republican	1920	Incumbent re-elected.	▌ ✓ Elliott W. Sproul (Republican) 52.7%; ▌Edward J. Glackin (Democratic) 47.1%; ▌Martin Nelson (Progressive) 0.2%
Illinois 4	Thomas A. Doyle	Democratic	1923	Incumbent re-elected.	▌ ✓ Thomas A. Doyle (Democratic) 62.9%; ▌John J. Dever (Republican) 37.1%
Illinois 5	Adolph J. Sabath	Democratic	1906	Incumbent re-elected.	▌ ✓ Adolph J. Sabath (Democratic) 58.8%; ▌Matt J. Vogel (Republican) 41.2%; ▌Arthur H. Grosskopf (Progressive) 0.0%
Illinois 6	John J. Gorman	Republican	1924	Incumbent lost re-election. Democratic gain.	▌ ✓ James T. Igoe (Democratic) 52.6%; ▌John J. Gorman (Republican) 47.4%
Illinois 7	M. Alfred Michaelson	Republican	1920	Incumbent re-elected.	▌ ✓ M. Alfred Michaelson (Republican) 57.8%; ▌John S. Hall (Democratic) 41.8%; ▌Chester A. Sample (Progressive) 0.4%
Illinois 8	Stanley H. Kunz	Democratic	1920	Incumbent re-elected.	▌ ✓ Stanley H. Kunz (Democratic) 55.3%; ▌Wencel F. Hetman (Republican) 44.7%
Illinois 9	Frederick A. Britten	Republican	1912	Incumbent re-elected.	▌ ✓ Frederick A. Britten (Republican) 97.8%; ▌Raymond W. Moore (Democratic) 1.8%; ▌Lillian Foley (Progressive) 0.4%
Illinois 10	Carl R. Chindblom	Republican	1918	Incumbent re-elected.	▌ ✓ Carl R. Chindblom (Republican) 66.0%; ▌William X. Meyer (Democratic) 34.0%
Illinois 11	Frank R. Reid	Republican	1922	Incumbent re-elected.	▌ ✓ Frank R. Reid (Republican) 69.5%; ▌Edward J. O'Beirne (Democratic) 30.5%
Illinois 12	Charles Eugene Fuller	Republican	1914	Incumbent died. Republican hold.	▌ ✓ John T. Buckbee (Republican) 57.8%; ▌John A. L. Warren (Democratic) 42.2%
Illinois 13	William Richard Johnson	Republican	1924	Incumbent re-elected.	▌ ✓ William Richard Johnson (Republican) 74.8%; ▌John A. Ascher (Democratic) 25.2%
Illinois 14	John Clayton Allen	Republican	1924	Incumbent re-elected.	▌ ✓ John Clayton Allen (Republican) 68.0%; ▌John W. Casto (Democratic) 32.0%
Illinois 15	Edward John King	Republican	1914	Incumbent re-elected.	▌ ✓ Edward John King (Republican) 62.6%; ▌F. W. Heckencamp Jr. (Democratic) 37.4%
Illinois 16	William E. Hull	Republican	1922	Incumbent re-elected.	▌ ✓ William E. Hull (Republican) 63.3%; ▌Carl M. Behrman (Democratic) 36.7%
Illinois 17	Frank H. Funk	Republican	1920	Incumbent lost renomination. Republican hold.	▌ ✓ Homer W. Hall (Republican) 64.9%; ▌Frank Gillespie (Democratic) 35.1%
Illinois 18	William P. Holaday	Republican	1922	Incumbent re-elected.	▌ ✓ William P. Holaday (Republican) 65.2%; ▌Wilbur H. Hickman (Democratic) 34.8%
Illinois 19	Charles Adkins	Republican	1924	Incumbent re-elected.	▌ ✓ Charles Adkins (Republican) 62.3%; ▌Joel T. Davis (Democratic) 37.7%
Illinois 20	Henry T. Rainey	Democratic	1922	Incumbent re-elected.	▌ ✓ Henry T. Rainey (Democratic) 57.8%; ▌Horace H. Bancroft (Republican) 42.2%
Illinois 21	Loren E. Wheeler	Republican	1924	Incumbent lost re-election. Democratic gain.	▌ ✓ J. Earl Major (Democratic) 52.8%; ▌Loren E. Wheeler (Republican) 47.2%
Illinois 22	Edward M. Irwin	Republican	1924	Incumbent re-elected.	▌ ✓ Edward M. Irwin (Republican) 58.5%; ▌William N. Baltz (Democratic) 41.5%
Illinois 23	William W. Arnold	Democratic	1922	Incumbent re-elected.	▌ ✓ William W. Arnold (Democratic) 55.9%; ▌Erastus D. Telford (Republican) 43.3%; ▌William Reund (Progressive) 0.8%
Illinois 24	Thomas Sutler Williams	Republican	1914	Incumbent re-elected.	▌ ✓ Thomas Sutler Williams (Republican) 56.1%; ▌John M. Karns (Democratic) 43.9%
Illinois 25	Edward E. Denison	Republican	1914	Incumbent re-elected.	▌ ✓ Edward E. Denison (Republican) 59.6%; ▌A. F. Gourley (Democratic) 40.4%
Illinois at-large	Richard Yates Jr.	Republican	1918	Incumbent re-elected.	▌ ✓ Henry R. Rathbone (Republican) 30.5%; ▌ ✓ Richard Yates Jr. (Republican) 30.5%; ▌Frank J. Wise (Democratic) 19.5%; ▌Charles A. Karch (Democratic) 19.0%; Others: ▌P. J. Carlson (Progressive) 0.2%; ▌Charles Pogoreles (Socialist) 0.1%; ▌George Koop (Socialist) 0.1%; ▌James S. O'Rourke (Socialist Labor) 0.1%; ▌A. H. Otto Beneze (Socialist Labor) 0.1%; ▌Charles D. Harrison (High Life) 0.0%; ▌Andrew A. Gour (Commonwealth Land) 0.0%; ▌Mary G. Connor (Commonwealth Land) 0.0%
Illinois at-large	Henry R. Rathbone	Republican	1922	Incumbent re-elected.	▌ ✓ Henry R. Rathbone (Republican) 30.5%; ▌ ✓ Richard Yates Jr. (Republican) 30.5%; ▌Frank J. Wise (Democratic) 19.5%; ▌Charles A. Karch (Democratic) 19.0%; Others: ▌P. J. Carlson (Progressive) 0.2%; ▌Charles Pogoreles (Socialist) 0.1%; ▌George Koop (Socialist) 0.1%; ▌James S. O'Rourke (Socialist Labor) 0.1%; ▌A. H. Otto Beneze (Socialist Labor) 0.1%; ▌Charles D. Harrison (High Life) 0.0%; ▌Andrew A. Gour (Commonwealth Land) 0.0%; ▌Mary G. Connor (Commonwealth Land) 0.0%

== Indiana ==
District	Incumbent			This race	
District	Member	Party	First elected	Results	Candidates
Indiana 1	Harry E. Rowbottom	Republican	1924	Incumbent re-elected.	▌ ✓ Harry E. Rowbottom (Republican) 52.4%; ▌William E. Wilson (Democratic) 47.6%
Indiana 2	Arthur H. Greenwood	Democratic	1922	Incumbent re-elected.	▌ ✓ Arthur H. Greenwood (Democratic) 55.4%; ▌John E. Sedwick (Republican) 44.6%
Indiana 3	Frank Gardner	Democratic	1922	Incumbent re-elected.	▌ ✓ Frank Gardner (Democratic) 54.6%; ▌W. Clyde Martin (Republican) 45.4%
Indiana 4	Harry C. Canfield	Democratic	1922	Incumbent re-elected.	▌ ✓ Harry C. Canfield (Democratic) 53.9%; ▌John W. Holcomb (Republican) 46.1%
Indiana 5	Noble J. Johnson	Republican	1924	Incumbent re-elected.	▌ ✓ Noble J. Johnson (Republican) 57.8%; ▌Henry W. Moore (Democratic) 42.2%
Indiana 6	Richard N. Elliott	Republican	1918	Incumbent re-elected.	▌ ✓ Richard N. Elliott (Republican) 55.2%; ▌William H. Myers (Democratic) 44.8%
Indiana 7	Ralph E. Updike	Republican	1924	Incumbent re-elected.	▌ ✓ Ralph E. Updike (Republican) 52.1%; ▌William D. Headrick (Democratic) 47.6%; ▌Turner T. Marshall (Socialist) 0.2%
Indiana 8	Albert H. Vestal	Republican	1916	Incumbent re-elected.	▌ ✓ Albert H. Vestal (Republican) 53.8%; ▌Claude C. Ball (Democratic) 46.2%
Indiana 9	Fred S. Purnell	Republican	1916	Incumbent re-elected.	▌ ✓ Fred S. Purnell (Republican) 52.6%; ▌Roy W. Adney (Democratic) 47.4%
Indiana 10	William R. Wood	Republican	1914	Incumbent re-elected.	▌ ✓ William R. Wood (Republican) 68.2%; ▌Harry O. Rhoades (Democratic) 31.8%
Indiana 11	Albert R. Hall	Republican	1924	Incumbent re-elected.	▌ ✓ Albert R. Hall (Republican) 54.2%; ▌Samuel E. Cook (Democratic) 45.8%
Indiana 12	David Hogg	Republican	1924	Incumbent re-elected.	▌ ✓ David Hogg (Republican) 55.3%; ▌Waldemar E. Eickhoff (Democratic) 44.7%
Indiana 13	Andrew J. Hickey	Republican	1918	Incumbent re-elected.	▌ ✓ Andrew J. Hickey (Republican) 54.9%; ▌Charles Weidler (Democratic) 45.1%

== Iowa ==
District	Incumbent			This race	
District	Member	Party	First elected	Results	Candidates
Iowa 1	William F. Kopp	Republican	1920	Incumbent re-elected.	▌ ✓ William F. Kopp (Republican) 70.6%; ▌James M. Bell (Democratic) 29.4%
Iowa 2	F. Dickinson Letts	Republican	1924	Incumbent re-elected.	▌ ✓ F. Dickinson Letts (Republican) 59.8%; ▌J. P. Gallagher (Democratic) 40.2%
Iowa 3	Thomas J. B. Robinson	Republican	1922	Incumbent re-elected.	▌ ✓ Thomas J. B. Robinson (Republican) 70.1%; ▌Ellis E. Wilson (Democratic) 29.9%
Iowa 4	Gilbert N. Haugen	Republican	1898	Incumbent re-elected.	▌ ✓ Gilbert N. Haugen (Republican) 60.4%; ▌Frank E. Howard (Democratic) 39.6%
Iowa 5	Cyrenus Cole	Republican	1921	Incumbent re-elected.	▌ ✓ Cyrenus Cole (Republican) 71.8%; ▌C. E. Walters (Democratic) 28.2%
Iowa 6	C. William Ramseyer	Republican	1914	Incumbent re-elected.	▌ ✓ C. William Ramseyer (Republican) 66.3%; ▌W. L. Etter (Democratic) 33.7%
Iowa 7	Cassius C. Dowell	Republican	1914	Incumbent re-elected.	▌ ✓ Cassius C. Dowell (Republican) 76.9%; ▌William M. Wade (Democratic) 23.1%
Iowa 8	Lloyd Thurston	Republican	1924	Incumbent re-elected.	▌ ✓ Lloyd Thurston (Republican) 62.0%; ▌W. S. Bradley (Democratic) 38.0%
Iowa 9	William R. Green	Republican	1910	Incumbent re-elected.	▌ ✓ William R. Green (Republican) 67.2%; ▌Charles F. Paschell (Democratic) 32.8%
Iowa 10	L. J. Dickinson	Republican	1918	Incumbent re-elected.	▌ ✓ L. J. Dickinson (Republican) 97.7%; ▌C. C. Davis (Independent) 2.3%
Iowa 11	William D. Boies	Republican	1918	Incumbent re-elected.	▌ ✓ William D. Boies (Republican) 64.4%; ▌R. J. Koehler (Democratic) 35.6%

== Kansas ==
District	Incumbent			This race	
District	Member	Party	First elected	Results	Candidates
Kansas 1	Daniel R. Anthony Jr.	Republican	1907 (special)	Incumbent re-elected.	▌ ✓ Daniel R. Anthony Jr. (Republican); Uncontested
Kansas 2	Chauncey B. Little	Democratic	1924	Incumbent lost re-election. Republican gain.	▌ ✓ U. S. Guyer (Republican) 51.6%; ▌Chauncey B. Little (Democratic) 48.4%
Kansas 3	William H. Sproul	Republican	1922	Incumbent re-elected.	▌ ✓ William H. Sproul (Republican) 50.5%; ▌Thurman Hill (Democratic) 49.5%
Kansas 4	Homer Hoch	Republican	1918	Incumbent re-elected.	▌ ✓ Homer Hoch (Republican) 65.2%; ▌Edwin F. Hammond (Democratic) 34.8%
Kansas 5	James G. Strong	Republican	1918	Incumbent re-elected.	▌ ✓ James G. Strong (Republican) 62.8%; ▌Rex Montgomery (Democratic) 37.2%
Kansas 6	Hays B. White	Republican	1918	Incumbent re-elected.	▌ ✓ Hays B. White (Republican) 50.1%; ▌W. H. Clark (Democratic) 49.9%
Kansas 7	Jasper N. Tincher	Republican	1918	Incumbent retired. Republican hold.	▌ ✓ Clifford R. Hope (Republican) 64.2%; ▌Harry F. Brown (Democratic) 35.8%
Kansas 8	William Augustus Ayres	Democratic	1914; 1920 (lost); 1922	Incumbent re-elected.	▌ ✓ William Augustus Ayres (Democratic) 60.1%; ▌Fred L. Bell (Republican) 39.9%

== Kentucky ==
District	Incumbent			This race	
District	Member	Party	First elected	Results	Candidates
Kentucky 1	Alben W. Barkley	Democratic	1912	Retired to run for U.S. senator. Democratic hold.	▌ ✓ W. Voris Gregory (Democratic) 67.8%; ▌Ora K. Mason (Republican) 32.2%
Kentucky 2	David Hayes Kincheloe	Democratic	1914	Incumbent re-elected.	▌ ✓ David Hayes Kincheloe (Democratic) 56.2%; ▌Ernest Rowe (Republican) 43.8%
Kentucky 3	John William Moore	Democratic	1925 (special)	Incumbent re-elected.	▌ ✓ John William Moore (Democratic) 56.2%; ▌Charles E. Whittle (Republican) 43.8%
Kentucky 4	Ben Johnson	Democratic	1906	Incumbent retired. Democratic hold.	▌ ✓ Henry D. Moorman (Democratic) 55.3%; ▌Pal Garner (Republican) 44.7%
Kentucky 5	Maurice Thatcher	Republican	1922	Incumbent re-elected.	▌ ✓ Maurice Thatcher (Republican) 54.8%; ▌S. M. Russell (Democratic) 45.2%
Kentucky 6	Arthur B. Rouse	Democratic	1910	Incumbent retired. Democratic hold.	▌ ✓ Orie S. Ware (Democratic) 57.2%; ▌Emmett H. Daugherty (Republican) 42.8%
Kentucky 7	Virgil Chapman	Democratic	1924	Incumbent re-elected.	▌ ✓ Virgil Chapman (Democratic); Uncontested
Kentucky 8	Ralph W. E. Gilbert	Democratic	1920	Incumbent re-elected.	▌ ✓ Ralph W. E. Gilbert (Democratic) 54.5%; ▌E. W. Draffen (Republican) 45.5%
Kentucky 9	Fred M. Vinson	Democratic	1924	Incumbent re-elected.	▌ ✓ Fred M. Vinson (Democratic) 59.1%; ▌Trumbo Snedegar (Republican) 40.9%
Kentucky 10	Andrew Jackson Kirk	Republican	1926 (special)	Incumbent lost renomination. Republican hold.	▌ ✓ Katherine G. Langley (Republican) 58.4%; ▌Doug Hays (Democratic) 41.6%
Kentucky 11	John M. Robsion	Republican	1918	Incumbent re-elected.	▌ ✓ John M. Robsion (Republican); Uncontested

== Louisiana ==
District	Incumbent			This race	
District	Member	Party	First elected	Results	Candidates
Louisiana 1	James O'Connor	Democratic	1918	Incumbent re-elected.	▌ ✓ James O'Connor (Democratic) 94.3%; ▌Gus Oertling (Republican) 5.7%
Louisiana 2	James Z. Spearing	Democratic	1924	Incumbent re-elected.	▌ ✓ James Z. Spearing (Democratic); Uncontested
Louisiana 3	Whitmell P. Martin	Democratic	1914	Incumbent re-elected.	▌ ✓ Whitmell P. Martin (Democratic); Uncontested
Louisiana 4	John N. Sandlin	Democratic	1920	Incumbent re-elected.	▌ ✓ John N. Sandlin (Democratic); Uncontested
Louisiana 5	Riley J. Wilson	Democratic	1914	Incumbent re-elected.	▌ ✓ Riley J. Wilson (Democratic); Uncontested
Louisiana 6	Bolivar E. Kemp	Democratic	1924	Incumbent re-elected.	▌ ✓ Bolivar E. Kemp (Democratic); Uncontested
Louisiana 7	Ladislas Lazaro	Democratic	1912	Incumbent re-elected.	▌ ✓ Ladislas Lazaro (Democratic); Uncontested
Louisiana 8	James Benjamin Aswell	Democratic	1912	Incumbent re-elected.	▌ ✓ James Benjamin Aswell (Democratic); Uncontested

== Maine ==
District	Incumbent			This race	
District	Member	Party	First elected	Results	Candidates
Maine 1	Carroll L. Beedy	Republican	1920	Incumbent re-elected.	▌ ✓ Carroll L. Beedy (Republican) 62.8%; ▌Richard E. Hersom (Democratic) 37.2%
Maine 2	Wallace H. White	Republican	1916	Incumbent re-elected.	▌ ✓ Wallace H. White (Republican) 56.6%; ▌Charles M. Starbird (Democratic) 43.4%
Maine 3	John E. Nelson	Republican	1922	Incumbent re-elected.	▌ ✓ John E. Nelson (Republican) 64.8%; ▌Edward Chase (Democratic) 35.2%
Maine 4	Ira G. Hersey	Republican	1916	Incumbent re-elected.	▌ ✓ Ira G. Hersey (Republican) 62.9%; ▌Frank A. Peabody (Democratic) 37.1%

== Maryland ==
District	Incumbent			This race	
District	Member	Party	First elected	Results	Candidates
Maryland 1	T. Alan Goldsborough	Democratic	1920	Incumbent re-elected.	▌ ✓ T. Alan Goldsborough (Democratic) 59.1%; ▌Lawrence B. Towers (Republican) 40.9%
Maryland 2	Millard Tydings	Democratic	1922	Retired to run for U.S. senator. Democratic hold.	▌ ✓ William P. Cole Jr. (Democratic) 58.8%; ▌Linwood Clark (Republican) 40.3%; ▌Richard T. Schneider (Socialist) 0.9%
Maryland 3	John Philip Hill	Republican	1920	Retired to run for U.S. senator. Democratic gain.	▌ ✓ Vincent L. Palmisano (Democratic) 58.7%; ▌John J. McGinity (Republican) 39.1%; ▌Samuel M. Neistadt (Socialist) 2.2%
Maryland 4	J. Charles Linthicum	Democratic	1910	Incumbent re-elected.	▌ ✓ J. Charles Linthicum (Democratic) 62.0%; ▌Julius F. Diehl (Republican) 37.1%; ▌Clarence H. Taylor (Socialist) 0.9%
Maryland 5	Stephen W. Gambrill	Democratic	1924	Incumbent re-elected.	▌ ✓ Stephen W. Gambrill (Democratic) 55.1%; ▌Thomas B. R. Mudd (Republican) 44.9%
Maryland 6	Frederick N. Zihlman	Republican	1916	Incumbent re-elected.	▌ ✓ Frederick N. Zihlman (Republican) 58.3%; ▌Frank W. Mish (Democratic) 40.9%; ▌Charles L. Myers (Socialist) 0.8%

== Massachusetts ==
District	Incumbent			This race	
District	Member	Party	First elected	Results	Candidates
Massachusetts 1	Allen T. Treadway	Republican	1912	Incumbent re-elected.	▌ ✓ Allen T. Treadway (Republican) 58.8%; ▌Eugene A. Lynch (Democratic) 41.2%
Massachusetts 2	Henry L. Bowles	Republican	1925 (special)	Incumbent re-elected.	▌ ✓ Henry L. Bowles (Republican) 64.0%; ▌John Hall (Democratic) 36.0%
Massachusetts 3	Frank H. Foss	Republican	1924	Incumbent re-elected.	▌ ✓ Frank H. Foss (Republican) 62.8%; ▌Joseph E. Casey (Democratic) 37.2%
Massachusetts 4	George R. Stobbs	Republican	1924	Incumbent re-elected.	▌ ✓ George R. Stobbs (Republican) 57.7%; ▌Peter F. Sullivan (Democratic) 42.3%
Massachusetts 5	Edith Nourse Rogers	Republican	1925 (special)	Incumbent re-elected.	▌ ✓ Edith Nourse Rogers (Republican) 71.1%; ▌James M. Hurley (Democratic) 28.9%
Massachusetts 6	A. Piatt Andrew	Republican	1921 (special)	Incumbent re-elected.	▌ ✓ A. Piatt Andrew (Republican) 76.9%; ▌James McPherson (Democratic) 23.1%
Massachusetts 7	William P. Connery Jr.	Democratic	1922	Incumbent re-elected.	▌ ✓ William P. Connery Jr. (Democratic) 64.0%; ▌George F. Hogan (Republican) 36.0%
Massachusetts 8	Vacant			Incumbent died. Republican hold. Also elected to the vacant term.	▌ ✓ Frederick W. Dallinger (Republican) 63.7%; ▌John P. Brennan (Democratic) 36.3%
Massachusetts 9	Charles L. Underhill	Republican	1920	Incumbent re-elected.	▌ ✓ Charles L. Underhill (Republican) 57.8%; ▌Francis X. Tyrrell (Democratic) 42.2%
Massachusetts 10	John J. Douglass	Democratic	1924	Incumbent re-elected.	▌ ✓ John J. Douglass (Democratic); Uncontested
Massachusetts 11	George H. Tinkham	Republican	1914	Incumbent re-elected.	▌ ✓ George H. Tinkham (Republican); Uncontested
Massachusetts 12	James A. Gallivan	Democratic	1914	Incumbent re-elected.	▌ ✓ James A. Gallivan (Democratic); Uncontested
Massachusetts 13	Robert Luce	Republican	1918	Incumbent re-elected.	▌ ✓ Robert Luce (Republican) 64.0%; ▌John P. Tierney (Democratic) 36.0%
Massachusetts 14	Louis A. Frothingham	Republican	1920	Incumbent re-elected.	▌ ✓ Louis A. Frothingham (Republican) 66.2%; ▌Frank A. Manning (Democratic) 33.8%
Massachusetts 15	Joseph W. Martin Jr.	Republican	1924	Incumbent re-elected.	▌ ✓ Joseph W. Martin Jr. (Republican) 65.2%; ▌Minerva D. Kepple (Democratic) 34.8%
Massachusetts 16	Charles L. Gifford	Republican	1922	Incumbent re-elected.	▌ ✓ Charles L. Gifford (Republican) 68.0%; ▌George Fox Tucker (Democratic) 32.0%

== Michigan ==
District	Incumbent			This race	
District	Member	Party	First elected	Results	Candidates
Michigan 1	John B. Sosnowski	Republican	1924	Incumbent lost renomination. Republican hold.	▌ ✓ Robert H. Clancy (Republican) 74.1%; ▌William M. Donnelly (Democratic) 25.0%; ▌Ira E. Albright (Independent) 0.8%
Michigan 2	Earl C. Michener	Republican	1918	Incumbent re-elected.	▌ ✓ Earl C. Michener (Republican) 66.7%; ▌Boyez Dansard (Democratic) 33.3%
Michigan 3	Joseph L. Hooper	Republican	1925	Incumbent re-elected.	▌ ✓ Joseph L. Hooper (Republican) 70.2%; ▌Frank L. Willison (Democratic) 29.8%
Michigan 4	John C. Ketcham	Republican	1920	Incumbent re-elected.	▌ ✓ John C. Ketcham (Republican) 96.3%; ▌Earl B. Sill (Democratic) 3.7%
Michigan 5	Carl E. Mapes	Republican	1912	Incumbent re-elected.	▌ ✓ Carl E. Mapes (Republican) 80.2%; ▌Frank C. Jarvis (Democratic) 19.8%
Michigan 6	Grant M. Hudson	Republican	1922	Incumbent re-elected.	▌ ✓ Grant M. Hudson (Republican) 68.0%; ▌Frank L. Dodge (Democratic) 32.0%
Michigan 7	Louis C. Cramton	Republican	1912	Incumbent re-elected.	▌ ✓ Louis C. Cramton (Republican) 78.1%; ▌Frank W. Merrick (Democratic) 21.9%
Michigan 8	Bird J. Vincent	Republican	1922	Incumbent re-elected.	▌ ✓ Bird J. Vincent (Republican); Uncontested
Michigan 9	James C. McLaughlin	Republican	1906	Incumbent re-elected.	▌ ✓ James C. McLaughlin (Republican) 99.3%; ▌Daniel C. Holder (Workers) 0.7%
Michigan 10	Roy O. Woodruff	Republican	1920	Incumbent re-elected.	▌ ✓ Roy O. Woodruff (Republican); Uncontested
Michigan 11	Frank D. Scott	Republican	1914	Incumbent lost renomination. Republican hold.	▌ ✓ Frank P. Bohn (Republican) 77.6%; ▌Robert H. Wright (Democratic) 22.4%
Michigan 12	W. Frank James	Republican	1914	Incumbent re-elected.	▌ ✓ W. Frank James (Republican); Uncontested
Michigan 13	Clarence J. McLeod	Republican	1922	Incumbent re-elected.	▌ ✓ Clarence J. McLeod (Republican) 68.0%; ▌Henry A. Behrendt (Democratic) 31.6%; ▌William Mollenhauer (Workers) 0.4%

== Minnesota ==
District	Incumbent			This race	
District	Member	Party	First elected	Results	Candidates
Minnesota 1	Allen J. Furlow	Republican	1924	Incumbent re-elected.	▌ ✓ Allen J. Furlow (Republican) 74.5%; ▌Lindley B. Hanna (Democratic) 25.5%
Minnesota 2	Frank Clague	Republican	1920	Incumbent re-elected.	▌ ✓ Frank Clague (Republican); Uncontested
Minnesota 3	August H. Andresen	Republican	1924	Incumbent re-elected.	▌ ✓ August H. Andresen (Republican) 63.3%; ▌August M. Gagen (Farmer–Labor) 21.3%; ▌Charles C. Kolars (Democratic) 15.4%
Minnesota 4	Oscar Keller	Republican	1918	Incumbent lost renomination. Republican hold.	▌ ✓ Melvin Maas (Republican) 54.3%; ▌Thomas V. Sullivan (Farmer–Labor) 41.0%; ▌Henry F. Wessel (Democratic) 4.6%
Minnesota 5	Walter Newton	Republican	1918	Incumbent re-elected.	▌ ✓ Walter Newton (Republican) 64.8%; ▌Albert G. Bastis (Farmer–Labor) 27.0%; ▌Fred Jensen (Democratic) 8.2%
Minnesota 6	Harold Knutson	Republican	1916	Incumbent re-elected.	▌ ✓ Harold Knutson (Republican) 59.4%; ▌Joseph B. Himsel (Farmer–Labor) 40.6%
Minnesota 7	Ole J. Kvale	Farmer–Labor	1922	Incumbent re-elected.	▌ ✓ Ole J. Kvale (Farmer–Labor) 59.0%; ▌Earl E. Howard (Republican) 41.0%
Minnesota 8	William L. Carss	Farmer–Labor	1924	Incumbent re-elected.	▌ ✓ William L. Carss (Farmer–Labor) 55.4%; ▌Oscar Larson (Republican) 44.6%
Minnesota 9	Knud Wefald	Farmer–Labor	1922	Incumbent lost re-election. Republican gain.	▌ ✓ Conrad Selvig (Republican) 50.7%; ▌Knud Wefald (Farmer–Labor) 49.3%
Minnesota 10	Godfrey G. Goodwin	Republican	1924	Incumbent re-elected.	▌ ✓ Godfrey G. Goodwin (Republican) 59.1%; ▌Ernest Lundeen (Farmer–Labor) 34.5%; ▌Henry A. Finlayson (Democratic) 6.4%

== Mississippi ==
District	Incumbent			This race	
District	Member	Party	First elected	Results	Candidates
Mississippi 1	John E. Rankin	Democratic	1920	Incumbent re-elected.	▌ ✓ John E. Rankin (Democratic); Uncontested
Mississippi 2	Bill G. Lowrey	Democratic	1920	Incumbent re-elected.	▌ ✓ Bill G. Lowrey (Democratic); Uncontested
Mississippi 3	William Madison Whittington	Democratic	1924	Incumbent re-elected.	▌ ✓ William Madison Whittington (Democratic); Uncontested
Mississippi 4	T. Jeff Busby	Democratic	1922	Incumbent re-elected.	▌ ✓ T. Jeff Busby (Democratic); Uncontested
Mississippi 5	Ross A. Collins	Democratic	1920	Incumbent re-elected.	▌ ✓ Ross A. Collins (Democratic); Uncontested
Mississippi 6	T. Webber Wilson	Democratic	1922	Incumbent re-elected.	▌ ✓ T. Webber Wilson (Democratic); Uncontested
Mississippi 7	Percy Quin	Democratic	1912	Incumbent re-elected.	▌ ✓ Percy Quin (Democratic); Uncontested
Mississippi 8	James W. Collier	Democratic	1908	Incumbent re-elected.	▌ ✓ James W. Collier (Democratic); Uncontested

== Missouri ==
District	Incumbent			This race	
District	Member	Party	First elected	Results	Candidates
Missouri 1	Milton A. Romjue	Democratic	1922	Incumbent re-elected.	▌ ✓ Milton A. Romjue (Democratic) 60.4%; ▌J. Frank Culler (Republican) 39.5%; ▌James T. Phillips (Socialist) 0.1%
Missouri 2	Ralph F. Lozier	Democratic	1922	Incumbent re-elected.	▌ ✓ Ralph F. Lozier (Democratic) 62.4%; ▌Sam A. Clark (Republican) 37.5%; ▌E. R. Anderson (Socialist) 0.1%
Missouri 3	Jacob L. Milligan	Democratic	1922	Incumbent re-elected.	▌ ✓ Jacob L. Milligan (Democratic) 56.3%; ▌Charles T. McLaughlin (Republican) 43.7%
Missouri 4	Charles L. Faust	Republican	1920	Incumbent re-elected.	▌ ✓ Charles L. Faust (Republican) 56.3%; ▌J. C. Whitsell (Democratic) 43.7%
Missouri 5	Edgar C. Ellis	Republican	1924	Incumbent lost re-election. Democratic gain.	▌ ✓ George H. Combs Jr. (Democratic) 56.2%; ▌Edgar C. Ellis (Republican) 43.7%; ▌Joseph G. Hodges (Socialist) 0.1%
Missouri 6	Clement C. Dickinson	Democratic	1922	Incumbent re-elected.	▌ ✓ Clement C. Dickinson (Democratic) 55.2%; ▌Millard E. Lane (Republican) 44.6%; ▌R. V. Shoemaker (Socialist) 0.1%
Missouri 7	Samuel C. Major	Democratic	1922	Incumbent re-elected.	▌ ✓ Samuel C. Major (Democratic) 52.1%; ▌Harold T. Lincoln (Republican) 47.8%; ▌John A. Detherow (Socialist) 0.1%
Missouri 8	William L. Nelson	Democratic	1924	Incumbent re-elected.	▌ ✓ William L. Nelson (Democratic) 56.2%; ▌C. W. Thomas (Republican) 43.8%
Missouri 9	Clarence Cannon	Democratic	1922	Incumbent re-elected.	▌ ✓ Clarence Cannon (Democratic) 61.2%; ▌Osmund Haenssler (Republican) 38.7%; ▌Harry Shumaker (Socialist) 0.1%
Missouri 10	Cleveland A. Newton	Republican	1918	Incumbent retired. Republican hold.	▌ ✓ Henry F. Niedringhaus (Republican) 66.1%; ▌Irvin Sale (Democratic) 33.9%; ▌Theodore Baeff (Socialist Labor) 0.1%
Missouri 11	Harry B. Hawes	Democratic	1920	Incumbent resigned to run for U.S. senator. Democratic hold. Winner also elected to finish the current term; see above.	▌ ✓ John J. Cochran (Democratic) 52.6%; ▌Henri Chouteau (Republican) 47.3%; ▌Joseph Spalti (Socialist) 0.1%
Missouri 12	Leonidas C. Dyer	Republican	1914	Incumbent re-elected.	▌ ✓ Leonidas C. Dyer (Republican) 61.3%; ▌David D. Israel (Democratic) 38.6%; ▌Charles Kuchan (Socialist Labor) 0.1%
Missouri 13	Charles Edward Kiefner	Republican	1924	Incumbent lost re-election. Democratic gain.	▌ ✓ Clyde Williams (Democratic) 50.6%; ▌Charles Edward Kiefner (Republican) 49.3%; ▌Noah Winston (Socialist) 0.1%
Missouri 14	Ralph E. Bailey	Republican	1924	Incumbent retired. Democratic gain.	▌ ✓ James F. Fulbright (Democratic) 51.5%; ▌James F. Adams (Republican) 48.5%
Missouri 15	Joe J. Manlove	Republican	1922	Incumbent re-elected.	▌ ✓ Joe J. Manlove (Republican) 59.7%; ▌Robert W. Moore (Democratic) 40.0%; ▌Jed A. High (Socialist) 0.3%
Missouri 16	Thomas L. Rubey	Democratic	1922	Incumbent re-elected.	▌ ✓ Thomas L. Rubey (Democratic) 56.5%; ▌Anna Covert (Republican) 43.5%

== Montana ==
District	Incumbent			This race	
District	Member	Party	First elected	Results	Candidates
Montana 1	John M. Evans	Democratic	1922	Incumbent re-elected.	▌ ✓ John M. Evans (Democratic) 59.4%; ▌Ronald Higgins (Republican) 39.9%; ▌George H. Ambrose (Socialist) 0.7%
Montana 2	Scott Leavitt	Republican	1922	Incumbent re-elected.	▌ ✓ Scott Leavitt (Republican) 54.9%; ▌Harry B. Mitchell (Democratic) 42.1%; ▌Clair Stoner (Farmer–Labor) 2.7%; ▌J. M. Kruse (Socialist) 0.3%

== Nebraska ==
District	Incumbent			This race	
District	Member	Party	First elected	Results	Candidates
Nebraska 1	John H. Morehead	Democratic	1922	Incumbent re-elected.	▌ ✓ John H. Morehead (Democratic) 55.3%; ▌George W. Marsh (Republican) 43.3%; ▌John H. Allen (Progressive) 1.3%
Nebraska 2	Willis G. Sears	Republican	1922	Incumbent re-elected.	▌ ✓ Willis G. Sears (Republican) 59.5%; ▌Grenville P. North (Democratic) 40.5%
Nebraska 3	Edgar Howard	Democratic	1922	Incumbent re-elected.	▌ ✓ Edgar Howard (Democratic) 60.7%; ▌John F. Nesbit (Republican) 29.1%; ▌Willis E. Reed (Independent) 10.2%
Nebraska 4	Melvin O. McLaughlin	Republican	1918	Incumbent lost re-election. Democratic gain.	▌ ✓ John N. Norton (Democratic) 50.6%; ▌Melvin O. McLaughlin (Republican) 49.4%
Nebraska 5	Ashton C. Shallenberger	Democratic	1922	Incumbent re-elected.	▌ ✓ Ashton C. Shallenberger (Democratic) 60.3%; ▌William E. Andrews (Republican) 39.7%
Nebraska 6	Robert G. Simmons	Republican	1922	Incumbent re-elected.	▌ ✓ Robert G. Simmons (Republican) 65.8%; ▌Thomas C. Osborne (Democratic) 34.2%

== Nevada ==
District	Incumbent			This race	
District	Member	Party	First elected	Results	Candidates
Nevada at-large	Samuel S. Arentz	Republican	1924	Incumbent re-elected.	▌ ✓ Samuel S. Arentz (Republican) 57.7%; ▌Maurice J. Sullivan (Democratic) 42.3%

== New Hampshire ==
District	Incumbent			This race	
District	Member	Party	First elected	Results	Candidates
New Hampshire 1	Fletcher Hale	Republican	1924	Incumbent re-elected.	▌ ✓ Fletcher Hale (Republican) 61.4%; ▌F. Clyde Keefe (Democratic) 38.6%
New Hampshire 2	Edward Hills Wason	Republican	1914	Incumbent re-elected.	▌ ✓ Edward Hills Wason (Republican) 63.2%; ▌George H. Duncan (Democratic) 36.8%

== New Jersey ==
District	Incumbent			This race	
District	Member	Party	First elected	Results	Candidates
New Jersey 1	Francis F. Patterson Jr.	Republican	1920	Incumbent lost renomination. Republican hold.	▌ ✓ Charles A. Wolverton (Republican) 69.7%; ▌Edward J. Kelleher (Democratic) 30.3%
New Jersey 2	Isaac Bacharach	Republican	1914	Incumbent re-elected.	▌ ✓ Isaac Bacharach (Republican) 80.6%; ▌Frank Melville (Democratic) 19.4%
New Jersey 3	Stewart H. Appleby	Republican	1925	Incumbent retired. Republican hold.	▌ ✓ Harold G. Hoffman (Republican) 60.7%; ▌Fred W. DeVoe (Democratic) 38.6%; ▌James G. Mason (Independent) 0.7%
New Jersey 4	Charles A. Eaton	Republican	1924	Incumbent re-elected.	▌ ✓ Charles A. Eaton (Republican) 62.0%; ▌William M. Williams (Democratic) 38.0%
New Jersey 5	Ernest R. Ackerman	Republican	1918	Incumbent re-elected.	▌ ✓ Ernest R. Ackerman (Republican) 63.7%; ▌Frank K. Sauer (Democratic) 36.3%
New Jersey 6	Randolph Perkins	Republican	1920	Incumbent re-elected.	▌ ✓ Randolph Perkins (Republican) 62.9%; ▌Francis C. Koehler (Democratic) 35.8%; Others: ▌Gustav Deak (Labor) 0.8%; ▌Henry J. Cox (Socialist) 0.5%
New Jersey 7	George N. Seger	Republican	1922	Incumbent re-elected.	▌ ✓ George N. Seger (Republican) 70.6%; ▌Susan A. McNair (Democratic) 26.6%; Others: ▌Frank Hubschmitt (Socialist) 1.7%; ▌Frank Giacomini (Labor) 1.1%
New Jersey 8	Herbert W. Taylor	Republican	1924	Incumbent lost re-election. Democratic gain.	▌ ✓ Paul J. Moore (Democratic) 58.0%; ▌Herbert W. Taylor (Republican) 41.6%; ▌Edward H. Mead (Socialist) 0.3%
New Jersey 9	Franklin W. Fort	Republican	1924	Incumbent re-elected.	▌ ✓ Franklin W. Fort (Republican) 60.2%; ▌James J. Whalen (Democratic) 39.8%
New Jersey 10	Frederick R. Lehlbach	Republican	1914	Incumbent re-elected.	▌ ✓ Frederick R. Lehlbach (Republican) 64.8%; ▌Edward W. Townsend (Democratic) 35.2%
New Jersey 11	Oscar L. Auf der Heide	Democratic	1924	Incumbent re-elected.	▌ ✓ Oscar L. Auf der Heide (Democratic) 76.1%; ▌George M. Eichler (Republican) 23.3%; ▌August P. Gunther (Socialist) 0.6%
New Jersey 12	Mary Teresa Norton	Democratic	1924	Incumbent re-elected.	▌ ✓ Mary Teresa Norton (Democratic) 83.1%; ▌Philip W. Grece (Republican) 16.9%

== New Mexico ==
District	Incumbent			This race	
District	Member	Party	First elected	Results	Candidates
New Mexico at-large	John Morrow	Democratic	1922	Incumbent re-elected.	▌ ✓ John Morrow (Democratic) 51.4%; ▌Juan A. A. Sedillo (Republican) 48.3%; ▌E. E. Denniston (Socialist) 0.3%

== New York ==
District	Incumbent			This race	
District	Member	Party	First elected	Results	Candidates
New York 1	Robert L. Bacon	Republican	1922	Incumbent re-elected.	▌ ✓ Robert L. Bacon (Republican) 63.4%; ▌W. Irving Vanderpool (Democratic) 35.3%; ▌William Herman (Socialist) 1.4%
New York 2	John J. Kindred	Democratic	1920	Incumbent re-elected.	▌ ✓ John J. Kindred (Democratic) 69.4%; ▌Louis G. Gosdorfer (Republican) 29.0%; ▌James Oneal (Socialist) 1.6%
New York 3	George W. Lindsay	Democratic	1922	Incumbent re-elected.	▌ ✓ George W. Lindsay (Democratic) 75.1%; ▌Walter H. Kreiner (Republican) 20.7%; ▌Joseph A. Weil (Socialist) 4.2%
New York 4	Thomas H. Cullen	Democratic	1918	Incumbent re-elected.	▌ ✓ Thomas H. Cullen (Democratic) 78.1%; ▌George H. Teommey, Sr. (Republican) 20.9%; ▌Lipa Zeirn (Socialist) 1.0%
New York 5	Loring M. Black Jr.	Democratic	1922	Incumbent re-elected.	▌ ✓ Loring M. Black Jr. (Democratic) 56.0%; ▌Robert C. Lee (Republican) 42.7%; ▌Sam L. Mailman (Socialist) 1.3%
New York 6	Andrew Lawrence Somers	Democratic	1924	Incumbent re-elected.	▌ ✓ Andrew Lawrence Somers (Democratic) 57.0%; ▌William F. Heissenbuttel (Republican) 37.2%; ▌William W. Passage (Socialist) 5.8%
New York 7	John F. Quayle	Democratic	1922	Incumbent re-elected.	▌ ✓ John F. Quayle (Democratic) 65.0%; ▌Harland B. Tibbetts (Republican) 28.1%; ▌Mendel Bromberg (Socialist) 6.9%
New York 8	William E. Cleary	Democratic	1922	Incumbent retired. Democratic hold.	▌ ✓ Patrick J. Carley (Democratic) 61.4%; ▌George W. Criss (Republican) 30.2%; ▌W. M. Feigenbaum (Socialist) 8.4%
New York 9	David J. O'Connell	Democratic	1922	Incumbent re-elected.	▌ ✓ David J. O'Connell (Democratic) 57.1%; ▌Edward W. Patterson (Republican) 39.3%; ▌Wilhemus B. Robinson (Socialist) 3.6%
New York 10	Emanuel Celler	Democratic	1922	Incumbent re-elected.	▌ ✓ Emanuel Celler (Democratic) 58.3%; ▌Samuel Rubin (Republican) 32.5%; ▌A. I. Shiplacoff (Socialist) 8.6%; ▌Bertram D. Wolfe (Workers) 0.6%
New York 11	Anning S. Prall	Democratic	1923	Incumbent re-elected.	▌ ✓ Anning S. Prall (Democratic) 72.2%; ▌Esli L. Sutton (Republican) 27.0%; ▌Eleanor Byrns (Socialist) 0.8%
New York 12	Samuel Dickstein	Democratic	1922	Incumbent re-elected.	▌ ✓ Samuel Dickstein (Democratic) 79.7%; ▌Joseph D. Tarlowe (Republican) 13.0%; ▌Harry Rogoff (Socialist) 7.3%
New York 13	Christopher D. Sullivan	Democratic	1916	Incumbent re-elected.	▌ ✓ Christopher D. Sullivan (Democratic) 75.7%; ▌John Fanelle (Republican) 18.9%; ▌Algernon Lee (Socialist) 5.2%; ▌Charles Krumbein (Workers) 0.3%
New York 14	Nathan D. Perlman	Republican	1920	Incumbent lost re-election. Democratic gain.	▌ ✓ William I. Sirovich (Democratic) 49.4%; ▌Nathan D. Perlman (Republican) 44.7%; ▌S. E. Beardsley (Socialist) 5.3%; ▌Alexander Trachtenberg (Workers) 0.5%
New York 15	John J. Boylan	Democratic	1922	Incumbent re-elected.	▌ ✓ John J. Boylan (Democratic) 80.8%; ▌John J. Curry (Republican) 17.8%; ▌Leonard Kaye (Socialist) 1.3%
New York 16	John J. O'Connor	Democratic	1923	Incumbent re-elected.	▌ ✓ John J. O'Connor (Democratic) 76.7%; ▌Fred W. Meyer (Republican) 21.7%; ▌Bertha Mailly (Socialist) 1.7%
New York 17	Ogden L. Mills	Republican	1920	Retired to run for Governor of New York. Democratic gain.	▌ ✓ William W. Cohen (Democratic) 50.4%; ▌Louis W. Stotesbury (Republican) 47.8%; ▌Anna Ingerman (Socialist) 1.9%
New York 18	John F. Carew	Democratic	1912	Incumbent re-elected.	▌ ✓ John F. Carew (Democratic) 77.7%; ▌Bernard Katzen (Republican) 18.3%; ▌Edward F. Cassidy (Socialist) 4.0%
New York 19	Sol Bloom	Democratic	1923	Incumbent re-elected.	▌ ✓ Sol Bloom (Democratic) 64.6%; ▌Harold Korn (Republican) 33.5%; ▌Joseph D. Cannon (Socialist) 2.0%
New York 20	Fiorello La Guardia	Socialist	1922	Incumbent re-elected as a Republican. Republican gain.	▌ ✓ Fiorello La Guardia (Republican) 47.1%; ▌H. W. Hubbard (Democratic) 46.8%; ▌George Dobsevage (Socialist) 5.5%; ▌William W. Weinstone (Workers) 0.7%
New York 21	Royal H. Weller	Democratic	1922	Incumbent re-elected.	▌ ✓ Royal H. Weller (Democratic) 55.4%; ▌Emanuel Hertz (Republican) 42.7%; ▌Lucile Randolph (Socialist) 1.9%
New York 22	Anthony J. Griffin	Democratic	1918	Incumbent re-elected.	▌ ✓ Anthony J. Griffin (Democratic) 73.2%; ▌R. Fred Talento (Republican) 22.3%; ▌Alex Braunstein (Socialist) 4.5%
New York 23	Frank Oliver	Democratic	1922	Incumbent re-elected.	▌ ✓ Frank Oliver (Democratic) 65.7%; ▌Morris S. Schector (Republican) 24.5%; ▌Samuel Orr (Socialist) 8.9%; ▌Moissaye J. Olgin (Workers) 0.9%
New York 24	Benjamin L. Fairchild	Republican	1923	Incumbent lost re-election. Democratic gain.	▌ ✓ James M. Fitzpatrick (Democratic) 50.6%; ▌Benjamin L. Fairchild (Republican) 44.3%; ▌Patrick J. Murphy (Socialist) 5.1%
New York 25	J. Mayhew Wainwright	Republican	1922	Incumbent re-elected.	▌ ✓ J. Mayhew Wainwright (Republican) 62.3%; ▌David L. Frank (Democratic) 35.9%; ▌John Hagerty (Socialist) 1.8%
New York 26	Hamilton Fish Jr.	Republican	1920	Incumbent re-elected.	▌ ✓ Hamilton Fish Jr. (Republican) 63.1%; ▌Walter G. Russell (Democratic) 34.0%; ▌James C. Hogan (Socialist) 2.9%
New York 27	Harcourt J. Pratt	Republican	1924	Incumbent re-elected.	▌ ✓ Harcourt J. Pratt (Republican) 61.3%; ▌Ransom H. Gillett (Democratic) 38.7%
New York 28	Parker Corning	Democratic	1922	Incumbent re-elected.	▌ ✓ Parker Corning (Democratic) 58.6%; ▌George W. Greene (Republican) 39.7%; ▌Allen Depew (Socialist) 1.7%
New York 29	James S. Parker	Republican	1912	Incumbent re-elected.	▌ ✓ James S. Parker (Republican) 97.9%; ▌T. J. Sullivan (Socialist) 2.1%
New York 30	Frank Crowther	Republican	1918	Incumbent re-elected.	▌ ✓ Frank Crowther (Republican) 57.3%; ▌E. Watson Gardiner (Democratic) 39.9%; ▌Herbert M. Merrill (Socialist) 2.8%
New York 31	Bertrand Snell	Republican	1915	Incumbent re-elected.	▌ ✓ Bertrand Snell (Republican) 70.1%; ▌Abner D. Whitney (Democratic) 29.9%
New York 32	Thaddeus C. Sweet	Republican	1923	Incumbent re-elected.	▌ ✓ Thaddeus C. Sweet (Republican) 67.8%; ▌John M. Reynolds (Democratic) 30.8%; ▌Thomas H. Lynch (Socialist) 1.3%
New York 33	Frederick M. Davenport	Republican	1924	Incumbent re-elected.	▌ ✓ Frederick M. Davenport (Republican) 56.2%; ▌Isaac C. Flint (Democratic) 41.6%; ▌Otto L. Endres (Socialist) 2.2%
New York 34	Harold S. Tolley	Republican	1924	Incumbent lost renomination. Republican hold.	▌ ✓ John D. Clarke (Republican) 71.6%; ▌Bernard J. McGuire (Democratic) 28.4%
New York 35	Walter W. Magee	Republican	1914	Incumbent re-elected.	▌ ✓ Walter W. Magee (Republican) 61.9%; ▌Wilber M. Jones (Democratic) 36.3%; ▌T. Deck Comerford (Socialist) 1.8%
New York 36	John Taber	Republican	1922	Incumbent re-elected.	▌ ✓ John Taber (Republican) 70.0%; ▌J. Seldon Brandt (Democratic) 30.0%
New York 37	Gale H. Stalker	Republican	1922	Incumbent re-elected.	▌ ✓ Gale H. Stalker (Republican) 58.2%; ▌Edwin S. Underhill (Democratic) 40.6%; ▌Daniel D. Hungerford (Socialist) 1.2%
New York 38	Meyer Jacobstein	Democratic	1922	Incumbent re-elected.	▌ ✓ Meyer Jacobstein (Democratic) 48.9%; ▌James E. Cuff (Republican) 47.1%; ▌William J. Bolton (Socialist) 4.0%
New York 39	Archie D. Sanders	Republican	1916	Incumbent re-elected.	▌ ✓ Archie D. Sanders (Republican) 67.7%; ▌David A. White (Democratic) 28.5%; ▌George Weber (Socialist) 3.8%
New York 40	S. Wallace Dempsey	Republican	1914	Incumbent re-elected.	▌ ✓ S. Wallace Dempsey (Republican) 65.7%; ▌William F. Sheehan (Democratic) 30.2%; ▌Thomas Justice (Socialist) 4.0%
New York 41	Clarence MacGregor	Republican	1918	Incumbent re-elected.	▌ ✓ Clarence MacGregor (Republican) 65.1%; ▌Robert M. Smyth (Democratic) 30.8%; ▌Martin B. Heisler (Socialist) 4.1%
New York 42	James M. Mead	Democratic	1918	Incumbent re-elected.	▌ ✓ James M. Mead (Democratic) 58.1%; ▌John Buno McGrath (Republican) 38.9%; ▌Florence A. McCarthy (Socialist) 3.0%
New York 43	Daniel A. Reed	Republican	1918	Incumbent re-elected.	▌ ✓ Daniel A. Reed (Republican) 73.9%; ▌John B. Leach (Democratic) 26.1%

== North Carolina ==
District	Incumbent			This race	
District	Member	Party	First elected	Results	Candidates
North Carolina 1	Lindsay C. Warren	Democratic	1924	Incumbent re-elected.	▌ ✓ Lindsay C. Warren (Democratic); Uncontested
North Carolina 2	John H. Kerr	Democratic	1923	Incumbent re-elected.	▌ ✓ John H. Kerr (Democratic); Uncontested
North Carolina 3	Charles L. Abernethy	Democratic	1922	Incumbent re-elected.	▌ ✓ Charles L. Abernethy (Democratic) 71.1%; ▌Roscoe Butler (Republican) 28.9%
North Carolina 4	Edward W. Pou	Democratic	1900	Incumbent re-elected.	▌ ✓ Edward W. Pou (Democratic) 69.2%; ▌Hobart Brantley (Republican) 30.8%
North Carolina 5	Charles Manly Stedman	Democratic	1910	Incumbent re-elected.	▌ ✓ Charles Manly Stedman (Democratic) 59.8%; ▌O. C. Durland (Republican) 40.2%
North Carolina 6	Homer L. Lyon	Democratic	1920	Incumbent re-elected.	▌ ✓ Homer L. Lyon (Democratic) 62.2%; ▌Leaman Baggett (Republican) 37.8%
North Carolina 7	William C. Hammer	Democratic	1920	Incumbent re-elected.	▌ ✓ William C. Hammer (Democratic) 55.8%; ▌S. Carter Williams (Republican) 44.2%
North Carolina 8	Robert L. Doughton	Democratic	1910	Incumbent re-elected.	▌ ✓ Robert L. Doughton (Democratic) 58.6%; ▌O. F. Pool (Republican) 41.4%
North Carolina 9	Alfred L. Bulwinkle	Democratic	1920	Incumbent re-elected.	▌ ✓ Alfred L. Bulwinkle (Democratic) 56.8%; ▌Garrett D. Bailey (Republican) 43.2%
North Carolina 10	Zebulon Weaver	Democratic	1916	Incumbent re-elected.	▌ ✓ Zebulon Weaver (Democratic) 55.8%; ▌R. Kenneth Smathers (Republican) 44.2%

== North Dakota ==
District	Incumbent			This race	
District	Member	Party	First elected	Results	Candidates
North Dakota 1	Olger B. Burtness	Republican	1920	Incumbent re-elected.	▌ ✓ Olger B. Burtness (Republican) 79.9%; ▌R. E. Smith (Democratic) 13.1%; ▌Donald MacDonald (Independent) 6.9%
North Dakota 2	Thomas Hall	Republican	1924	Incumbent re-elected.	▌ ✓ Thomas Hall (Republican) 66.4%; ▌J. L. Page (Democratic) 27.0%; ▌C. W. Reichert (Independent) 6.6%
North Dakota 3	James H. Sinclair	Republican	1918	Incumbent re-elected.	▌ ✓ James H. Sinclair (Republican) 87.8%; ▌Reuben H. Leavitt (Democratic) 12.2%

== Ohio ==
District	Incumbent			This race	
District	Member	Party	First elected	Results	Candidates
Ohio 1	Nicholas Longworth	Republican	1914	Incumbent re-elected.	▌ ✓ Nicholas Longworth (Republican) 62.9%; ▌John C. Rogers (Democratic) 36.8%; ▌Edward D. Colley (Independent) 0.4%
Ohio 2	Ambrose E. B. Stephens	Republican	1918	Incumbent re-elected.	▌ ✓ Ambrose E. B. Stephens (Republican) 58.2%; ▌Robert J. O'Donnell (Democratic) 41.8%
Ohio 3	Roy G. Fitzgerald	Republican	1920	Incumbent re-elected.	▌ ✓ Roy G. Fitzgerald (Republican) 60.4%; ▌T. A. McCann (Democratic) 39.6%
Ohio 4	William T. Fitzgerald	Republican	1924	Incumbent re-elected.	▌ ✓ William T. Fitzgerald (Republican) 50.7%; ▌Benjamin F. Welty (Democratic) 49.3%
Ohio 5	Charles J. Thompson	Republican	1918	Incumbent re-elected.	▌ ✓ Charles J. Thompson (Republican) 50.7%; ▌Frank C. Kniffin (Democratic) 49.3%
Ohio 6	Charles C. Kearns	Republican	1914	Incumbent re-elected.	▌ ✓ Charles C. Kearns (Republican) 52.8%; ▌Edward N. Kennedy (Democratic) 47.2%
Ohio 7	Charles Brand	Republican	1922	Incumbent re-elected.	▌ ✓ Charles Brand (Republican) 67.2%; ▌H. E. Rice (Democratic) 32.8%
Ohio 8	Thomas B. Fletcher	Democratic	1924	Incumbent re-elected.	▌ ✓ Thomas B. Fletcher (Democratic) 56.5%; ▌James R. Hopley (Republican) 43.5%
Ohio 9	William W. Chalmers	Republican	1924	Incumbent re-elected.	▌ ✓ William W. Chalmers (Republican) 64.5%; ▌C. W. Davis (Democratic) 32.6%; ▌George F. Parrish (Independent) 1.5%; ▌Millard Price (Socialist) 1.4%
Ohio 10	Thomas A. Jenkins	Republican	1924	Incumbent re-elected.	▌ ✓ Thomas A. Jenkins (Republican) 63.9%; ▌Guy Stevenson (Democratic) 36.1%
Ohio 11	Mell G. Underwood	Democratic	1922	Incumbent re-elected.	▌ ✓ Mell G. Underwood (Democratic) 62.1%; ▌Walter S. Barrett (Republican) 37.9%
Ohio 12	John C. Speaks	Republican	1920	Incumbent re-elected.	▌ ✓ John C. Speaks (Republican) 56.4%; ▌H. S. Atkinson (Democratic) 43.6%
Ohio 13	James T. Begg	Republican	1918	Incumbent re-elected.	▌ ✓ James T. Begg (Republican) 65.1%; ▌G. C. Steineman (Democratic) 34.9%
Ohio 14	Martin L. Davey	Democratic	1922	Incumbent re-elected.	▌ ✓ Martin L. Davey (Democratic) 65.4%; ▌Arthur W. Sweeney (Republican) 34.6%
Ohio 15	C. Ellis Moore	Republican	1918	Incumbent re-elected.	▌ ✓ C. Ellis Moore (Republican) 54.6%; ▌E. B. Schneider (Democratic) 45.4%
Ohio 16	John McSweeney	Democratic	1922	Incumbent re-elected.	▌ ✓ John McSweeney (Democratic) 59.8%; ▌Charles B. McClintock (Republican) 40.2%
Ohio 17	William M. Morgan	Republican	1920	Incumbent re-elected.	▌ ✓ William M. Morgan (Republican) 55.0%; ▌J. Freer Bittinger (Democratic) 45.0%
Ohio 18	B. Frank Murphy	Republican	1918	Incumbent re-elected.	▌ ✓ B. Frank Murphy (Republican) 65.4%; ▌John F. Nolan (Democratic) 34.6%
Ohio 19	John G. Cooper	Republican	1914	Incumbent re-elected.	▌ ✓ John G. Cooper (Republican) 72.3%; ▌James Kennedy (Democratic) 27.7%
Ohio 20	Charles A. Mooney	Democratic	1922	Incumbent re-elected.	▌ ✓ Charles A. Mooney (Democratic); Uncontested
Ohio 21	Robert Crosser	Democratic	1922	Incumbent re-elected.	▌ ✓ Robert Crosser (Democratic) 62.4%; ▌Harry C. Gahn (Republican) 37.6%
Ohio 22	Theodore E. Burton	Republican	1920	Incumbent re-elected.	▌ ✓ Theodore E. Burton (Republican); Uncontested

== Oklahoma ==
District	Incumbent			This race	
District	Member	Party	First elected	Results	Candidates
Oklahoma 1	Samuel J. Montgomery	Republican	1924	Incumbent lost re-election. Democratic gain.	▌ ✓ Everette B. Howard (Democratic) 50.6%; ▌Samuel J. Montgomery (Republican) 49.4%
Oklahoma 2	William W. Hastings	Democratic	1922	Incumbent re-elected.	▌ ✓ William W. Hastings (Democratic) 56.9%; ▌H. L. Wineland (Republican) 43.1%
Oklahoma 3	Charles D. Carter	Democratic	1907 (new state)	Incumbent lost renomination. Democratic hold.	▌ ✓ Wilburn Cartwright (Democratic) 67.1%; ▌George W. Strawn (Republican) 32.4%; Others: ▌Ben F. Pardue (Socialist) 0.4%; ▌J. J. Rogers (Independent) 0.1%
Oklahoma 4	Tom D. McKeown	Democratic	1922	Incumbent re-elected.	▌ ✓ Tom D. McKeown (Democratic) 60.8%; ▌Charles E. Wells (Republican) 39.2%
Oklahoma 5	Fletcher B. Swank	Democratic	1920	Incumbent re-elected.	▌ ✓ Fletcher B. Swank (Democratic) 60.6%; ▌Barritt Galloway (Republican) 39.4%
Oklahoma 6	Elmer Thomas	Democratic	1922	Retired to run for U.S. senator. Democratic hold.	▌ ✓ Jed Johnson (Democratic) 54.1%; ▌Fred W. Lankard (Republican) 45.2%; ▌O. A. Patswals (Farmer–Labor) 0.7%
Oklahoma 7	James V. McClintic	Democratic	1914	Incumbent re-elected.	▌ ✓ James V. McClintic (Democratic) 70.5%; ▌Walter S. Mills (Republican) 29.0%; ▌W. H. Conley (Socialist) 0.5%
Oklahoma 8	Milton C. Garber	Republican	1922	Incumbent re-elected.	▌ ✓ Milton C. Garber (Republican) 58.7%; ▌C. H. Hyde (Democratic) 40.7%; Others: ▌J. H. Vaughn (Socialist) 0.3%; ▌Alfred Reynolds (Farmer–Labor) 0.2%

== Oregon ==
District	Incumbent			This race	
District	Member	Party	First elected	Results	Candidates
Oregon 1	Willis C. Hawley	Republican	1906	Incumbent re-elected.	▌ ✓ Willis C. Hawley (Republican) 71.1%; ▌Newton W. Borden (Democratic) 28.9%
Oregon 2	Nicholas J. Sinnott	Republican	1912	Incumbent re-elected.	▌ ✓ Nicholas J. Sinnott (Republican) 70.4%; ▌John S. Hodgin (Democratic) 29.6%
Oregon 3	Maurice E. Crumpacker	Republican	1924	Incumbent re-elected.	▌ ✓ Maurice E. Crumpacker (Republican) 71.8%; ▌Joseph K. Carson Jr. (Democratic) 28.2%

== Pennsylvania ==
District	Incumbent			This race	
District	Member	Party	First elected	Results	Candidates
Pennsylvania 1	William S. Vare	Republican	1912	Retired to run for U.S. senator. Republican hold.	▌ ✓ James M. Hazlett (Republican) 92.8%; ▌William L. Rooney (Democratic) 6.9%; Others: ▌William Pensler (Socialist) 0.3%; ▌Francis J. Pfrommer (Commonwealth Land) 0.0%
Pennsylvania 2	George S. Graham	Republican	1912	Incumbent re-elected.	▌ ✓ George S. Graham (Republican) 91.3%; ▌John J. Shanahan (Democratic) 7.9%; Others: ▌John W. Cook (Prohibition) 0.5%; ▌Clarence O. Wonner (Socialist) 0.3%; ▌Leo W. Marks (Commonwealth Land) 0.1%
Pennsylvania 3	Harry C. Ransley	Republican	1920	Incumbent re-elected.	▌ ✓ Harry C. Ransley (Republican) 93.2%; ▌Frank J. McDonnell (Democratic) 6.2%; Others: ▌Emil Klein (Socialist) 0.3%; ▌Edward Allen (Prohibition) 0.3%; ▌Rodney Emsley (Commonwealth Land) 0.1%
Pennsylvania 4	Benjamin M. Golder	Republican	1924	Incumbent re-elected.	▌ ✓ Benjamin M. Golder (Republican) 82.9%; ▌David L. Ullman (Democratic) 14.2%; Others: ▌John Cook (Prohibition) 1.7%; ▌Alphonze Olbrick (Socialist) 0.7%; ▌Thomas J. Davis (Commonwealth Land) 0.5%
Pennsylvania 5	James J. Connolly	Republican	1920	Incumbent re-elected.	▌ ✓ James J. Connolly (Republican) 84.8%; ▌Daniel J. O'Donnell (Democratic) 11.9%; Others: ▌Bert Wahl (Socialist) 1.3%; ▌James Connolly (Prohibition) 1.1%; ▌Raymond James (Commonwealth Land) 1.0%
Pennsylvania 6	George A. Welsh	Republican	1922	Incumbent re-elected.	▌ ✓ George A. Welsh (Republican) 79.4%; ▌Thomas A. Logue (Democratic) 15.8%; ▌Royal Stephens (Prohibition) 3.9%; Others: ▌Edward Norton (Socialist) 0.8%; ▌Frederick E. Mayer (Commonwealth Land) 0.1%
Pennsylvania 7	George P. Darrow	Republican	1914	Incumbent re-elected.	▌ ✓ George P. Darrow (Republican) 80.5%; ▌Harry J. Conway (Democratic) 17.1%; Others: ▌Samuel R. Witham (Prohibition) 1.4%; ▌William G. Toplis (Socialist) 0.9%; ▌Oliver Wingert (Commonwealth Land) 0.1%
Pennsylvania 8	Thomas S. Butler	Republican	1896	Incumbent re-elected.	▌ ✓ Thomas S. Butler (Republican) 82.2%; ▌Frank B. Rhodes (Democratic) 16.2%; ▌Walter L. Moore (Prohibition) 1.6%
Pennsylvania 9	Henry Winfield Watson	Republican	1914	Incumbent re-elected.	▌ ✓ Henry Winfield Watson (Republican) 71.3%; ▌Richard J. Hamilton (Democratic) 26.7%; Others: ▌Ellwood Sand (Prohibition) 1.3%; ▌Edwin S. Orr (Socialist) 0.7%
Pennsylvania 10	William W. Griest	Republican	1908	Incumbent re-elected.	▌ ✓ William W. Griest (Republican) 66.8%; ▌W. W. Heidelbaugh (Democratic) 33.2%
Pennsylvania 11	Laurence H. Watres	Republican	1922	Incumbent re-elected.	▌ ✓ Laurence H. Watres (Republican) 70.1%; ▌Joseph J. Walsh (Democratic) 29.9%
Pennsylvania 12	Edmund N. Carpenter	Republican	1924	Incumbent lost re-election. Democratic gain.	▌ ✓ John J. Casey (Democratic) 76.5%; ▌Edmund N. Carpenter (Republican) 23.5%
Pennsylvania 13	George F. Brumm	Republican	1922	Incumbent lost renomination. Republican hold.	▌ ✓ Cyrus M. Palmer (Republican) 54.2%; ▌Neal J. Ferry (Democratic) 43.9%; ▌Cornelius Foley (Socialist) 1.9%
Pennsylvania 14	Charles J. Esterly	Republican	1924	Incumbent retired. Republican hold.	▌ ✓ Robert G. Bushong (Republican) 50.2%; ▌Arthur G. Dewalt (Democratic) 44.7%; ▌Raymond S. Hofses (Labor) 5.1%
Pennsylvania 15	Louis T. McFadden	Republican	1914	Incumbent re-elected.	▌ ✓ Louis T. McFadden (Republican) 69.4%; ▌Charles M. Driggs (Democratic) 30.6%
Pennsylvania 16	Edgar R. Kiess	Republican	1912	Incumbent re-elected.	▌ ✓ Edgar R. Kiess (Republican); Uncontested
Pennsylvania 17	Frederick W. Magrady	Republican	1924	Incumbent re-elected.	▌ ✓ Frederick W. Magrady (Republican) 52.7%; ▌Herbert W. Cummings (Democratic) 47.3%
Pennsylvania 18	Edward M. Beers	Republican	1922	Incumbent re-elected.	▌ ✓ Edward M. Beers (Republican) 67.9%; ▌Frederick A. Rupp (Democratic) 32.1%
Pennsylvania 19	Joshua W. Swartz	Republican	1924	Incumbent retired. Republican hold.	▌ ✓ Isaac H. Doutrich (Republican) 60.1%; ▌Frank C. Sites (Democratic) 39.4%; Others: ▌John R. Page (Socialist) 0.5%; ▌B. E. P. Prugh (Prohibition) 0.0%
Pennsylvania 20	Anderson H. Walters	Republican	1924	Incumbent retired. Republican hold.	▌ ✓ J. Russell Leech (Republican) 54.8%; ▌Warren W. Bailey (Democratic) 37.7%; ▌Harry Crichton (Prohibition) 7.5%
Pennsylvania 21	J. Banks Kurtz	Republican	1922	Incumbent re-elected.	▌ ✓ J. Banks Kurtz (Republican) 74.7%; ▌Harry K. Filler (Democratic) 19.8%; ▌Charles Kutz (Labor) 5.0%; ▌Howard Kline (Socialist) 0.5%
Pennsylvania 22	Franklin Menges	Republican	1924	Incumbent re-elected.	▌ ✓ Franklin Menges (Republican) 57.0%; ▌Samuel F. Glatfelter (Democratic) 42.5%; ▌George E. Smith (Socialist) 0.5%
Pennsylvania 23	William I. Swoope	Republican	1922	Incumbent retired. Republican hold.	▌ ✓ J. Mitchell Chase (Republican) 69.8%; ▌Clarence R. Kramer (Democratic) 30.2%
Pennsylvania 24	Samuel A. Kendall	Republican	1918	Incumbent re-elected.	▌ ✓ Samuel A. Kendall (Republican) 75.7%; ▌Clark W. Martin (Democratic) 24.3%
Pennsylvania 25	Henry W. Temple	Republican	1912	Incumbent re-elected.	▌ ✓ Henry W. Temple (Republican) 58.8%; ▌James S. Pates (Democratic) 41.2%
Pennsylvania 26	Thomas Wharton Phillips Jr.	Republican	1922	Retired to run for Governor of Pennsylvania. Republican hold.	▌ ✓ J. Howard Swick (Republican) 62.0%; ▌James P. Leaf (Democratic) 38.0%; ▌Edward W. Hayden (Independent) 0.0%
Pennsylvania 27	Nathan L. Strong	Republican	1916	Incumbent re-elected.	▌ ✓ Nathan L. Strong (Republican) 71.8%; ▌D. A. Dorn (Democratic) 24.3%; ▌N. L. Strong (Labor) 2.7%; ▌D. A. Palmer (Socialist) 1.3%
Pennsylvania 28	Harris J. Bixler	Republican	1920	Incumbent lost renomination. Republican hold.	▌ ✓ Thomas Cunningham Cochran (Republican); Uncontested
Pennsylvania 29	Milton W. Shreve	Republican	1918	Incumbent re-elected.	▌ ✓ Milton W. Shreve (Republican) 82.6%; ▌William H. Kerschner (Prohibition) 17.4%
Pennsylvania 30	William R. Coyle	Republican	1924	Incumbent lost re-election. Democratic gain.	▌ ✓ Everett Kent (Democratic) 50.9%; ▌William R. Coyle (Republican) 47.9%; Others: ▌Benjamin E. Bender (Prohibition) 0.8%; ▌Wilson Brown (Socialist) 0.3%
Pennsylvania 31	Adam M. Wyant	Republican	1920	Incumbent re-elected.	▌ ✓ Adam M. Wyant (Republican) 65.7%; ▌Albert H. Bell (Democratic) 32.1%; ▌Harry Eckard (Socialist) 2.2%
Pennsylvania 32	Stephen G. Porter	Republican	1910	Incumbent re-elected.	▌ ✓ Stephen G. Porter (Republican) 82.3%; ▌Walter P. Berner (Democratic) 13.6%; ▌Grace Howarth (Prohibition) 3.1%; ▌Sarah Limbach (Socialist) 0.9%
Pennsylvania 33	M. Clyde Kelly	Republican	1916	Incumbent re-elected.	▌ ✓ M. Clyde Kelly (Republican) 96.2%; ▌Sidney Stark (Socialist) 3.8%
Pennsylvania 34	John M. Morin	Republican	1912	Incumbent re-elected.	▌ ✓ John M. Morin (Republican) 96.5%; ▌Charles B. Quailey (Prohibition) 2.6%; Others: ▌David Rinne (Socialist) 0.6%; ▌Sam Shore (Workers) 0.3%
Pennsylvania 35	James M. Magee	Republican	1922	Incumbent lost renomination. Incumbent lost re-election as Labor-Prohibition. Republican hold.	▌ ✓ Harry A. Estep (Republican) 77.5%; ▌John Murphy (Democratic) 13.8%; ▌James M. Magee (Labor) 7.1%; ▌William J. Van Essen (Socialist) 1.6%
Pennsylvania 36	Guy E. Campbell	Republican	1916	Incumbent re-elected.	▌ ✓ Guy E. Campbell (Republican) 84.2%; ▌Ellsworth C. Trott (Prohibition) 10.8%; ▌John W. Hedderich Jr. (Labor) 3.1%; ▌John W. Adams (Socialist) 2.0%

== Rhode Island ==
District	Incumbent			This race	
District	Member	Party	First elected	Results	Candidates
Rhode Island 1	Clark Burdick	Republican	1918	Incumbent re-elected.	▌ ✓ Clark Burdick (Republican) 63.0%; ▌Arthur L. Conaty (Democratic) 37.0%
Rhode Island 2	Richard S. Aldrich	Republican	1922	Incumbent re-elected.	▌ ✓ Richard S. Aldrich (Republican) 61.8%; ▌Clarence E. Palmer (Democratic) 38.2%
Rhode Island 3	Jeremiah E. O'Connell	Democratic	1922	Incumbent lost re-election. Republican gain.	▌ ✓ Louis Monast (Republican) 50.4%; ▌Jeremiah E. O'Connell (Democratic) 49.6%

== South Carolina ==
District	Incumbent			This race	
District	Member	Party	First elected	Results	Candidates
South Carolina 1	Thomas S. McMillan	Democratic	1924	Incumbent re-elected.	▌ ✓ Thomas S. McMillan (Democratic); Uncontested
South Carolina 2	Butler B. Hare	Democratic	1924	Incumbent re-elected.	▌ ✓ Butler B. Hare (Democratic); Uncontested
South Carolina 3	Frederick H. Dominick	Democratic	1916	Incumbent re-elected.	▌ ✓ Frederick H. Dominick (Democratic); Uncontested
South Carolina 4	John J. McSwain	Democratic	1920	Incumbent re-elected.	▌ ✓ John J. McSwain (Democratic); Uncontested
South Carolina 5	William Francis Stevenson	Democratic	1917	Incumbent re-elected.	▌ ✓ William Francis Stevenson (Democratic); Uncontested
South Carolina 6	Allard H. Gasque	Democratic	1922	Incumbent re-elected.	▌ ✓ Allard H. Gasque (Democratic); Uncontested
South Carolina 7	Hampton P. Fulmer	Democratic	1920	Incumbent re-elected.	▌ ✓ Hampton P. Fulmer (Democratic); Uncontested

== South Dakota ==
District	Incumbent			This race	
District	Member	Party	First elected	Results	Candidates
South Dakota 1	Charles A. Christopherson	Republican	1918	Incumbent re-elected.	▌ ✓ Charles A. Christopherson (Republican) 55.1%; ▌J. E. House (Democratic) 38.9%; ▌Alli Reed (Farmer–Labor) 6.1%
South Dakota 2	Royal C. Johnson	Republican	1914	Incumbent re-elected.	▌ ✓ Royal C. Johnson (Republican) 63.4%; ▌Fred H. Hildebrandt (Democratic) 36.6%
South Dakota 3	William Williamson	Republican	1920	Incumbent re-elected.	▌ ✓ William Williamson (Republican) 52.4%; ▌Arthur W. Watwood (Democratic) 47.6%

== Tennessee ==
District	Incumbent			This race	
District	Member	Party	First elected	Results	Candidates
Tennessee 1	B. Carroll Reece	Republican	1920	Incumbent re-elected.	▌ ✓ B. Carroll Reece (Republican) 88.0%; ▌W. I. Giles (Democratic) 12.0%
Tennessee 2	J. Will Taylor	Republican	1918	Incumbent re-elected.	▌ ✓ J. Will Taylor (Republican) 99.8%; ▌R. L. Swann (Democratic) 0.2%
Tennessee 3	Sam D. McReynolds	Democratic	1922	Incumbent re-elected.	▌ ✓ Sam D. McReynolds (Democratic) 85.6%; ▌L. D. Copeland (Republican) 14.4%
Tennessee 4	Cordell Hull	Democratic	1922	Incumbent re-elected.	▌ ✓ Cordell Hull (Democratic) 71.4%; ▌W. Thompson (Republican) 28.6%
Tennessee 5	Ewin L. Davis	Democratic	1918	Incumbent re-elected.	▌ ✓ Ewin L. Davis (Democratic); Uncontested
Tennessee 6	Jo Byrns	Democratic	1908	Incumbent re-elected.	▌ ✓ Jo Byrns (Democratic); Uncontested
Tennessee 7	Edward Everett Eslick	Democratic	1924	Incumbent re-elected.	▌ ✓ Edward Everett Eslick (Democratic); Uncontested
Tennessee 8	Gordon Browning	Democratic	1922	Incumbent re-elected.	▌ ✓ Gordon Browning (Democratic); Uncontested
Tennessee 9	Finis J. Garrett	Democratic	1904	Incumbent re-elected.	▌ ✓ Finis J. Garrett (Democratic); Uncontested
Tennessee 10	Hubert Fisher	Democratic	1916	Incumbent re-elected.	▌ ✓ Hubert Fisher (Democratic); Uncontested

== Texas ==
District	Incumbent			This race	
District	Member	Party	First elected	Results	Candidates
Texas 1	Eugene Black	Democratic	1914	Incumbent re-elected.	▌ ✓ Eugene Black (Democratic) 94.8%; ▌O. F. Wimmer (Republican) 5.2%
Texas 2	John C. Box	Democratic	1918	Incumbent re-elected.	▌ ✓ John C. Box (Democratic) 95.5%; ▌William C. Hall (Republican) 4.5%
Texas 3	Morgan G. Sanders	Democratic	1920	Incumbent re-elected.	▌ ✓ Morgan G. Sanders (Democratic) 91.2%; ▌E. G. Fletcher (Republican) 8.8%
Texas 4	Sam Rayburn	Democratic	1912	Incumbent re-elected.	▌ ✓ Sam Rayburn (Democratic) 89.9%; ▌Henry C. Barlow (Republican) 10.1%
Texas 5	Hatton W. Sumners	Democratic	1914	Incumbent re-elected.	▌ ✓ Hatton W. Sumners (Democratic) 96.5%; ▌Clinton S. Bailey (Republican) 3.5%
Texas 6	Luther A. Johnson	Democratic	1922	Incumbent re-elected.	▌ ✓ Luther A. Johnson (Democratic) 96.1%; ▌John A. Newson (Republican) 3.9%
Texas 7	Clay Stone Briggs	Democratic	1918	Incumbent re-elected.	▌ ✓ Clay Stone Briggs (Democratic) 94.1%; ▌Sam R. Halstead (Republican) 5.9%
Texas 8	Daniel E. Garrett	Democratic	1920	Incumbent re-elected.	▌ ✓ Daniel E. Garrett (Democratic) 90.9%; ▌J. M. Gibson (Republican) 9.1%
Texas 9	Joseph J. Mansfield	Democratic	1916	Incumbent re-elected.	▌ ✓ Joseph J. Mansfield (Democratic) 82.6%; ▌E. F. Glaze (Republican) 17.4%
Texas 10	James P. Buchanan	Democratic	1912	Incumbent re-elected.	▌ ✓ James P. Buchanan (Democratic) 93.2%; ▌W. A. Matthaei (Republican) 6.8%
Texas 11	Tom Connally	Democratic	1916	Incumbent re-elected.	▌ ✓ Tom Connally (Democratic) 94.2%; ▌W. H. Black (Republican) 5.8%
Texas 12	Fritz G. Lanham	Democratic	1919	Incumbent re-elected.	▌ ✓ Fritz G. Lanham (Democratic) 94.4%; ▌David Sutton (Republican) 5.6%
Texas 13	Guinn Williams	Democratic	1922	Incumbent re-elected.	▌ ✓ Guinn Williams (Democratic) 94.5%; ▌Mel E. Peters (Republican) 5.5%
Texas 14	Harry M. Wurzbach	Republican	1920	Incumbent re-elected.	▌ ✓ Harry M. Wurzbach (Republican) 57.2%; ▌A. D. Rogers (Democratic) 42.8%
Texas 15	John Nance Garner	Democratic	1902	Incumbent re-elected.	▌ ✓ John Nance Garner (Democratic) 82.8%; ▌Hardie H. Jefferies (Republican) 17.2%
Texas 16	Claude B. Hudspeth	Democratic	1918	Incumbent re-elected.	▌ ✓ Claude B. Hudspeth (Democratic) 85.6%; ▌A. N. Norcup (Republican) 14.4%
Texas 17	Thomas L. Blanton	Democratic	1916	Incumbent re-elected.	▌ ✓ Thomas L. Blanton (Democratic) 93.8%; ▌H. B. Tanner (Republican) 6.2%
Texas 18	John Marvin Jones	Democratic	1916	Incumbent re-elected.	▌ ✓ John Marvin Jones (Democratic) 93.6%; ▌S. E. Fish (Republican) 6.4%

== Utah ==
District	Incumbent			This race	
District	Member	Party	First elected	Results	Candidates
Utah 1	Don B. Colton	Republican	1920	Incumbent re-elected.	▌ ✓ Don B. Colton (Republican) 61.4%; ▌Ephraim Bergeson (Democratic) 38.0%; ▌John W. Watters (Socialist) 0.6%
Utah 2	Elmer O. Leatherwood	Republican	1920	Incumbent re-elected.	▌ ✓ Elmer O. Leatherwood (Republican) 60.2%; ▌William R. Wallace Jr. (Democratic) 38.6%; ▌Otto E. Parsons (Socialist) 1.2%

== Vermont ==
District	Incumbent			This race	
District	Member	Party	First elected	Results	Candidates
Vermont 1	Elbert S. Brigham	Republican	1924	Incumbent re-elected.	▌ ✓ Elbert S. Brigham (Republican) 72.3%; ▌Allan T. Calhoun (Democratic) 27.7%
Vermont 2	Ernest W. Gibson	Republican	1923	Incumbent re-elected.	▌ ✓ Ernest W. Gibson (Republican) 80.4%; ▌George F. Root (Democratic) 19.6%

== Virginia ==
District	Incumbent			This race	
District	Member	Party	First elected	Results	Candidates
Virginia 1	S. Otis Bland	Democratic	1918	Incumbent re-elected.	▌ ✓ S. Otis Bland (Democratic); Uncontested
Virginia 2	Joseph T. Deal	Democratic	1920	Incumbent re-elected.	▌ ✓ Joseph T. Deal (Democratic) 65.4%; ▌L. S. Parsons (Republican) 34.6%
Virginia 3	Jack Montague	Democratic	1912	Incumbent re-elected.	▌ ✓ Jack Montague (Democratic); Uncontested
Virginia 4	Patrick H. Drewry	Democratic	1920	Incumbent re-elected.	▌ ✓ Patrick H. Drewry (Democratic); Uncontested
Virginia 5	Joseph Whitehead	Democratic	1924	Incumbent re-elected.	▌ ✓ Joseph Whitehead (Democratic); Uncontested
Virginia 6	Clifton A. Woodrum	Democratic	1922	Incumbent re-elected.	▌ ✓ Clifton A. Woodrum (Democratic); Uncontested
Virginia 7	Thomas W. Harrison	Democratic	1916	Incumbent re-elected.	▌ ✓ Thomas W. Harrison (Democratic) 64.9%; ▌Walter R. Talbot (Republican) 29.4%; ▌Dabney C. Harrison (Independent) 5.7%
Virginia 8	R. Walton Moore	Democratic	1919	Incumbent re-elected.	▌ ✓ R. Walton Moore (Democratic) 95.5%; ▌J. W. Leedy (Republican) 4.5%
Virginia 9	George C. Peery	Democratic	1922	Incumbent re-elected.	▌ ✓ George C. Peery (Democratic) 53.4%; ▌S. R. Hurley (Republican) 46.6%
Virginia 10	Henry St. George Tucker III	Democratic	1922	Incumbent re-elected.	▌ ✓ Henry St. George Tucker III (Democratic); Uncontested

== Washington ==
District	Incumbent			This race	
District	Member	Party	First elected	Results	Candidates
Washington 1	John Franklin Miller	Republican	1916	Incumbent re-elected.	▌ ✓ John Franklin Miller (Republican) 51.1%; ▌Stephen F. Chadwick (Democratic) 48.9%
Washington 2	Lindley H. Hadley	Republican	1914	Incumbent re-elected.	▌ ✓ Lindley H. Hadley (Republican) 68.5%; ▌Frances C. Axtell (Democratic) 30.6%; ▌August Toellner (Independent) 0.9%
Washington 3	Albert Johnson	Republican	1912	Incumbent re-elected.	▌ ✓ Albert Johnson (Republican); Uncontested
Washington 4	John W. Summers	Republican	1918	Incumbent re-elected.	▌ ✓ John W. Summers (Republican) 99.8%; ▌May Ripley (Independent) 0.2%
Washington 5	Samuel B. Hill	Democratic	1923	Incumbent re-elected.	▌ ✓ Samuel B. Hill (Democratic) 52.1%; ▌Jack T. Fancher (Republican) 47.9%

== West Virginia ==
District	Incumbent			This race	
District	Member	Party	First elected	Results	Candidates
West Virginia 1	Carl G. Bachmann	Republican	1924	Incumbent re-elected.	▌ ✓ Carl G. Bachmann (Republican) 52.2%; ▌George W. Oldham (Democratic) 47.8%
West Virginia 2	Frank L. Bowman	Republican	1924	Incumbent re-elected.	▌ ✓ Frank L. Bowman (Republican) 54.0%; ▌Robert E. Lee Allen (Democratic) 45.7%; ▌Emelio Garbarino (Socialist) 0.3%
West Virginia 3	John M. Wolverton	Republican	1924	Incumbent lost re-election. Democratic gain.	▌ ✓ William S. O'Brien (Democratic) 51.8%; ▌John M. Wolverton (Republican) 48.2%
West Virginia 4	Harry C. Woodyard	Republican	1924	Incumbent retired. Republican hold.	▌ ✓ James A. Hughes (Republican) 52.4%; ▌John D. Sweeney (Democratic) 47.6%
West Virginia 5	James F. Strother	Republican	1924	Incumbent re-elected.	▌ ✓ James F. Strother (Republican) 53.3%; ▌Emmett F. Scaggs (Democratic) 46.7%
West Virginia 6	J. Alfred Taylor	Democratic	1922	Incumbent lost re-election. Republican gain.	▌ ✓ Edward T. England (Republican) 50.1%; ▌J. Alfred Taylor (Democratic) 49.9%

== Wisconsin ==
District	Incumbent			This race	
District	Member	Party	First elected	Results	Candidates
Wisconsin 1	Henry A. Cooper	Republican	1920	Incumbent re-elected.	▌ ✓ Henry A. Cooper (Republican); Uncontested
Wisconsin 2	Edward Voigt	Republican	1916	Incumbent retired. Republican hold.	▌ ✓ Charles A. Kading (Republican) 69.4%; ▌Ernst C. Wrucke (Democratic) 19.3%; ▌John H. Kaiser (Independent) 11.2%
Wisconsin 3	John M. Nelson	Republican	1920	Incumbent re-elected.	▌ ✓ John M. Nelson (Republican); Uncontested
Wisconsin 4	John C. Schafer	Republican	1922	Incumbent re-elected.	▌ ✓ John C. Schafer (Republican) 48.0%; ▌Edmund T. Melms (Social-Democratic) 35.2%; ▌William J. Kershaw (Democratic) 16.8%
Wisconsin 5	Victor L. Berger	Social-Democratic	1922	Incumbent re-elected.	▌ ✓ Victor L. Berger (Social-Democratic) 48.8%; ▌William H. Stafford (Republican) 44.9%; ▌Rose Horwitz (Democratic) 6.3%
Wisconsin 6	Florian Lampert	Republican	1918	Incumbent re-elected.	▌ ✓ Florian Lampert (Republican) 76.0%; ▌B. F. Sheridan (Democratic) 24.0%
Wisconsin 7	Joseph D. Beck	Republican	1920	Incumbent re-elected.	▌ ✓ Joseph D. Beck (Republican) 86.1%; ▌A. H. Schubert (Independent) 9.6%; ▌Henry N. Stephenson (Prohibition) 4.3%
Wisconsin 8	Edward E. Browne	Republican	1912	Incumbent re-elected.	▌ ✓ Edward E. Browne (Republican) 91.9%; ▌R. J. Walsh (Independent) 8.1%
Wisconsin 9	George J. Schneider	Republican	1922	Incumbent re-elected.	▌ ✓ George J. Schneider (Republican); Uncontested
Wisconsin 10	James A. Frear	Republican	1912	Incumbent re-elected.	▌ ✓ James A. Frear (Republican) 97.4%; ▌Otto D. Kahl (Prohibition) 2.6%
Wisconsin 11	Hubert H. Peavey	Republican	1922	Incumbent re-elected.	▌ ✓ Hubert H. Peavey (Republican) 70.2%; ▌Theodore M. Thomas (Independent) 26.8%; ▌Harriet Smith Olson (Prohibition) 3.1%

== Wyoming ==
District	Incumbent			This race	
District	Member	Party	First elected	Results	Candidates
Wyoming at-large	Charles E. Winter	Republican	1922	Incumbent re-elected.	▌ ✓ Charles E. Winter (Republican) 60.8%; ▌Thomas M. Fagan (Democratic) 38.7%; ▌Daniel A. Hastings (Radical) 0.5%

== Non-voting delegates ==
=== Alaska Territory ===
District	Incumbent			This race	
District	Delegate	Party	First elected	Results	Candidates
Alaska Territory at-large	Daniel Sutherland	Republican	1920	Incumbent re-elected.	▌ ✓ Daniel Sutherland (Republican); [data missing]

== See also ==
- 1926 United States elections
  - 1926 United States Senate elections
- 69th United States Congress
- 70th United States Congress
