= 1924 United States House of Representatives elections in South Carolina =

The 1924 United States House of Representatives elections in South Carolina were held on November 4, 1924, to select seven Representatives for two-year terms from the state of South Carolina. Five incumbents were re-elected and the two open seats were retained by the Democrats. The composition of the state delegation thus remained solely Democratic.

== 1st congressional district ==
Incumbent Democratic Congressman W. Turner Logan of the 1st congressional district, in office since 1921, was defeated in the Democratic primary by Thomas S. McMillan. He defeated Republican challenger Jesse E. Beard in the general election.

=== Democratic primary ===
Democratic primary
Candidate	Votes	%
W. Turner Logan	7,270	33.0
Thomas S. McMillan	5,685	25.8
Ben E. Adams	5,544	25.2
I. Shep Hutto	3,513	16.0

Democratic primary runoff
Candidate	Votes	%	±%
Thomas S. McMillan	11,811	56.0	+30.2
W. Turner Logan	9,272	44.0	+11.0

=== General election results ===
South Carolina's 1st congressional district election results, 1924
Party	Candidate	Votes	%	±%
Democratic	Thomas S. McMillan	5,278	95.4	+1.4
Republican	Jesse E. Beard	253	4.6	−1.4
Majority		5,025	90.8	+2.8
Turnout		5,531		
Democratic hold				

== 2nd congressional district ==
Incumbent Democratic Congressman James F. Byrnes of the 2nd congressional district, in office since 1911, opted to make an unsuccessful run for Senator. Butler B. Hare won the Democratic primary and was unopposed in the general election.

=== Democratic primary ===
Democratic primary
Candidate	Votes	%
R.L. Gunter	4,867	23.0
Butler B. Hare	4,636	22.0
Benjamin R. Tillman Jr.	4,153	19.7
Gasper L. Toole	3,763	17.8
W.D. Black	3,706	17.5

Democratic primary runoff
Candidate	Votes	%	±%
Butler B. Hare	12,195	56.8	+34.8
R.L. Gunter	9,272	43.2	+20.2

=== General election results ===
South Carolina's 2nd congressional district election results, 1924
Party	Candidate	Votes	%	±%
Democratic	Butler B. Hare	6,695	100.0	0.0
Majority		6,695	100.0	0.0
Turnout		6,695		
Democratic hold				

== 3rd congressional district ==
Incumbent Democratic Congressman Frederick H. Dominick of the 3rd congressional district, in office since 1917, won the Democratic primary and was unopposed in the general election.

=== Democratic primary ===
Democratic primary
Candidate	Votes	%
Frederick H. Dominick	21,210	58.8
W. Plumer Nicholson	9,845	27.3
C.H. Carpenter	5,008	13.9

=== General election results ===
South Carolina's 3rd congressional district election results, 1924
Party	Candidate	Votes	%	±%
Democratic	Frederick H. Dominick (incumbent)	8,331	100.0	0.0
Majority		8,331	100.0	0.0
Turnout		8,331		
Democratic hold				

== 4th congressional district ==
Incumbent Democratic Congressman John J. McSwain of the 4th congressional district, in office since 1921, was unopposed in his bid for re-election.

=== General election results ===
South Carolina's 4th congressional district election results, 1924
Party	Candidate	Votes	%	±%
Democratic	John J. McSwain (incumbent)	7,718	100.0	+2.7
Majority		7,718	100.0	+5.4
Turnout		7,718		
Democratic hold				

== 5th congressional district ==
Incumbent Democratic Congressman William F. Stevenson of the 5th congressional district, in office since 1917, defeated W.R. Bradford in the Democratic primary and was unopposed in the general election.

=== Democratic primary ===
Democratic primary
Candidate	Votes	%
William F. Stevenson	22,489	84.1
W.R. Bradford	4,256	15.9

=== General election results ===
South Carolina's 5th congressional district election results, 1924
Party	Candidate	Votes	%	±%
Democratic	William F. Stevenson (incumbent)	7,689	100.0	0.0
Majority		7,689	100.0	0.0
Turnout		7,689		
Democratic hold				

== 6th congressional district ==
Incumbent Democratic Congressman Allard H. Gasque of the 6th congressional district, in office since 1923, was unopposed in his bid for re-election.

=== General election results ===
South Carolina's 6th congressional district election results, 1924
Party	Candidate	Votes	%	±%
Democratic	Allard H. Gasque (incumbent)	6,278	100.0	0.0
Majority		6,278	100.0	0.0
Turnout		6,278		
Democratic hold				

== 7th congressional district ==
Incumbent Democratic Congressman Hampton P. Fulmer of the 7th congressional district, in office since 1921, won the Democratic primary and was unopposed in the general election.

=== Democratic primary ===
Democratic primary
Candidate	Votes	%
Hampton P. Fulmer	18,250	66.0
L.A. Hutson	5,955	21.5
D.A. Crosson	3,463	12.5

=== General election results ===
South Carolina's 7th congressional district election results, 1924
Party	Candidate	Votes	%	±%
Democratic	Hampton P. Fulmer (incumbent)	7,249	100.0	+1.5
Majority		7,249	100.0	+3.0
Turnout		7,249		
Democratic hold				

== See also ==
- United States House of Representatives elections, 1924
- South Carolina gubernatorial election, 1924
- South Carolina's congressional districts
