= Clara G. McMillan =

American politician (1894–1976)

Clara Gooding McMillan
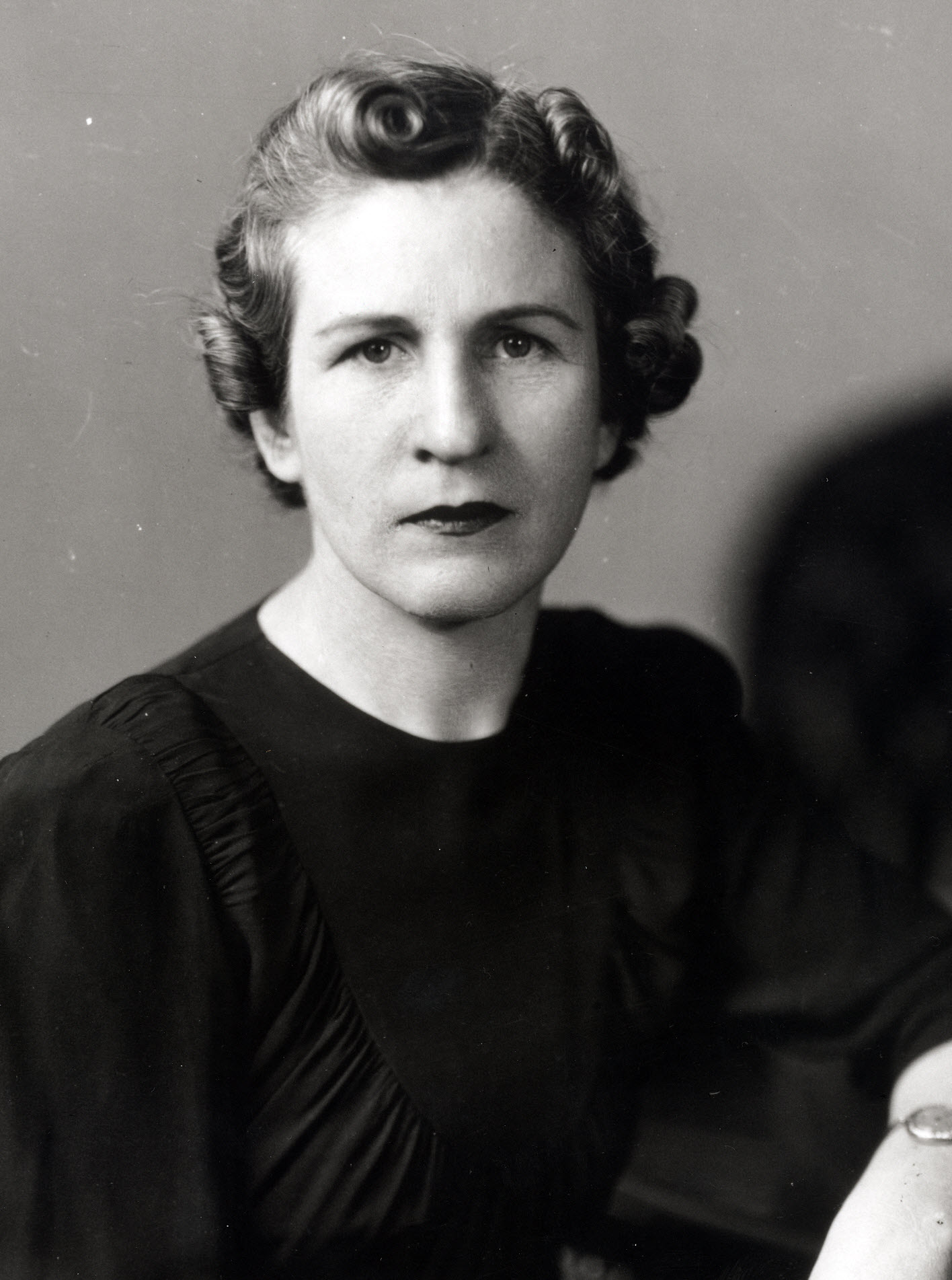

Member of the U.S. House of Representatives from South Carolina's 1st district
- In office November 7, 1939 – January 3, 1941
- Preceded by: Thomas S. McMillan
- Succeeded by: L. Mendel Rivers

Personal details
- Born: August 17, 1894 Brunson, South Carolina, U.S.
- Died: November 8, 1976 (aged 82) Barnwell, South Carolina, U.S.
- Resting place: Charleston, South Carolina, U.S.
- Party: Democratic
- Spouse: Thomas S. McMillan
- Education: Confederate Home College; Flora MacDonald College
- Profession: Civil servant

Clara McMillan (née Gooding; August 17, 1894 – November 8, 1976) was a U.S. representative from South Carolina, and wife of Thomas S. McMillan.

== Biography ==
Born in Brunson, South Carolina, Mcmillan attended the public schools, Confederate Home College, Charleston, South Carolina, and Flora MacDonald College, Red Springs, North Carolina.

Mcmillan was elected as a Democrat to the Seventy-sixth Congress by special election, on November 7, 1939, to fill the vacancy caused by the death of her husband, Thomas S. McMillan, and served from November 7, 1939, to January 3, 1941. She was not a candidate for reelection in 1940 to the Seventy-seventh Congress. She served in National Youth Administration, then the Office of Government Reports, Office of War Information, 1941. She was appointed information liaison officer for the Department of State, Washington, D.C., on January 1, 1946, and served until July 31, 1957.

McMillan resided in Barnwell, South Carolina, until her death on November 8, 1976. She was interred in Magnolia Cemetery, Charleston, South Carolina.

== See also ==
- Women in the United States House of Representatives

== Sources ==
- United States Congress. "Clara G. McMillan (id: M000565)". Biographical Directory of the United States Congress.

U.S. House of Representatives
Preceded by Thomas S. McMillan	Member of the U.S. House of Representatives from South Carolina's 1st congressional district 1939–1941	Succeeded by L. Mendel Rivers
