= 1920 United States House of Representatives elections in South Carolina =

The 1920 United States House of Representatives elections in South Carolina were held on November 2, 1920, to select seven Representatives for two-year terms from the state of South Carolina. Four incumbents were re-elected and all three open seats were retained by the Democrats. The composition of the state delegation thus remained solely Democratic.

== 1st congressional district ==
Incumbent Democratic Congressman Richard S. Whaley of the 1st congressional district, in office since 1913, opted to retire. W. Turner Logan defeated F.F. Carroll in the Democratic primary and Republican challenger Saspartas in the general election.

=== Democratic primary ===
Democratic primary
Candidate	Votes	%
W. Turner Logan	6,246	67.0
F.F. Carroll	3,071	33.0

=== General election results ===
South Carolina's 1st congressional district election results, 1920
Party	Candidate	Votes	%	±%
Democratic	W. Turner Logan	6,301	92.6	−7.4
Republican	T. St. Mark Sasportas	502	7.4	+7.4
Majority		5,799	85.2	−14.8
Turnout		6,803		
Democratic hold				

== 2nd congressional district ==
Incumbent Democratic Congressman James F. Byrnes of the 2nd congressional district, in office since 1911, was unopposed in his bid for re-election.

=== General election results ===
South Carolina's 2nd congressional district election results, 1920
Party	Candidate	Votes	%	±%
Democratic	James F. Byrnes (incumbent)	6,685	100.0	0.0
Majority		6,685	100.0	0.0
Turnout		6,685		
Democratic hold				

== 3rd congressional district ==
Incumbent Democratic Congressman Frederick H. Dominick of the 3rd congressional district, in office since 1917, defeated W.W. Bradley in the Democratic primary and was unopposed in the general election.

=== Democratic primary ===
Democratic primary
Candidate	Votes	%
Frederick H. Dominick	10,454	61.5
W.W. Bradley	6,544	38.5

=== General election results ===
South Carolina's 3rd congressional district election results, 1920
Party	Candidate	Votes	%	±%
Democratic	Frederick H. Dominick (incumbent)	9,699	100.0	0.0
Majority		9,699	100.0	0.0
Turnout		9,699		
Democratic hold				

== 4th congressional district ==
Incumbent Democratic Congressman Samuel J. Nicholls of the 4th congressional district, in office since 1915, opted to retire. John J. McSwain won the Democratic primary and was unopposed in the general election.

=== Democratic primary ===
Democratic primary
Candidate	Votes	%
John J. McSwain	9,092	50.0
Albert E. Hill	4,401	24.2
D.B. Traxler	3,302	18.2
Jack Wilson	1,386	7.6

=== General election results ===
South Carolina's 4th congressional district election results, 1920
Party	Candidate	Votes	%	±%
Democratic	John J. McSwain	13,436	100.0	0.0
Majority		13,436	100.0	0.0
Turnout		13,436		
Democratic hold				

== 5th congressional district ==
Incumbent Democratic Congressman William F. Stevenson of the 5th congressional district, in office since 1917, was unopposed in his bid for re-election.

=== General election results ===
South Carolina's 5th congressional district election results, 1920
Party	Candidate	Votes	%	±%
Democratic	William F. Stevenson (incumbent)	10,186	100.0	0.0
Majority		10,186	100.0	0.0
Turnout		10,186		
Democratic hold				

== 6th congressional district ==
Incumbent Democratic Congressman Philip H. Stoll of the 6th congressional district, in office since 1919, was unopposed in his bid for re-election.

=== General election results ===
South Carolina's 6th congressional district election results, 1920
Party	Candidate	Votes	%	±%
Democratic	Philip H. Stoll (incumbent)	8,681	100.0	0.0
Majority		8,681	100.0	0.0
Turnout		8,681		
Democratic hold				

== 7th congressional district ==
Incumbent Democratic Congressman Edward C. Mann of the 7th congressional district, in office since 1919, was defeated in the Democratic primary by Hampton P. Fulmer. He defeated Republican challenger L.A. Hawkins in the general election.

=== Democratic primary ===
Democratic primary
Candidate	Votes	%
Hampton P. Fulmer	7,286	55.3
Edward C. Mann	5,891	44.7

=== General election results ===
South Carolina's 7th congressional district election results, 1920
Party	Candidate	Votes	%	±%
Democratic	Hampton P. Fulmer	9,412	91.9	−8.1
Republican	L.A. Hawkins	834	8.1	+8.1
No party	Write-Ins	1	0.0	0.0
Majority		8,578	83.8	−16.2
Turnout		10,247		
Democratic hold				

== See also ==
- 1920 United States House of Representatives elections
- 1920 South Carolina gubernatorial election
- South Carolina's congressional districts
