= William M. Donnelly =

American politician

William M. Donnelly (1885 – January 30, 1946) was a politician from the U.S. state of Michigan.

Donnelly, of Detroit, Michigan, was an unsuccessful Democratic candidate from Michigan's 1st congressional district in a contest for a seat in the U.S. House in three consecutive elections. He lost all three to Republican Robert H. Clancy in 1926, 1928 and 1930 for the 70th, 71st and 72nd Congresses. He was a member of the Michigan Democratic State Central Committee and a delegate to Democratic National Convention from Michigan in 1928 and 1944.

Donnelly was a member of Michigan House of Representatives from Wayne County 1st District, 1933–34. He was defeated in the primaries for that seat in 1934 and 1940. Four years later he was again elected and served from 1945 until his death the following year at the age of sixty.
