= John B. Sosnowski =

American politician (1883–1968)

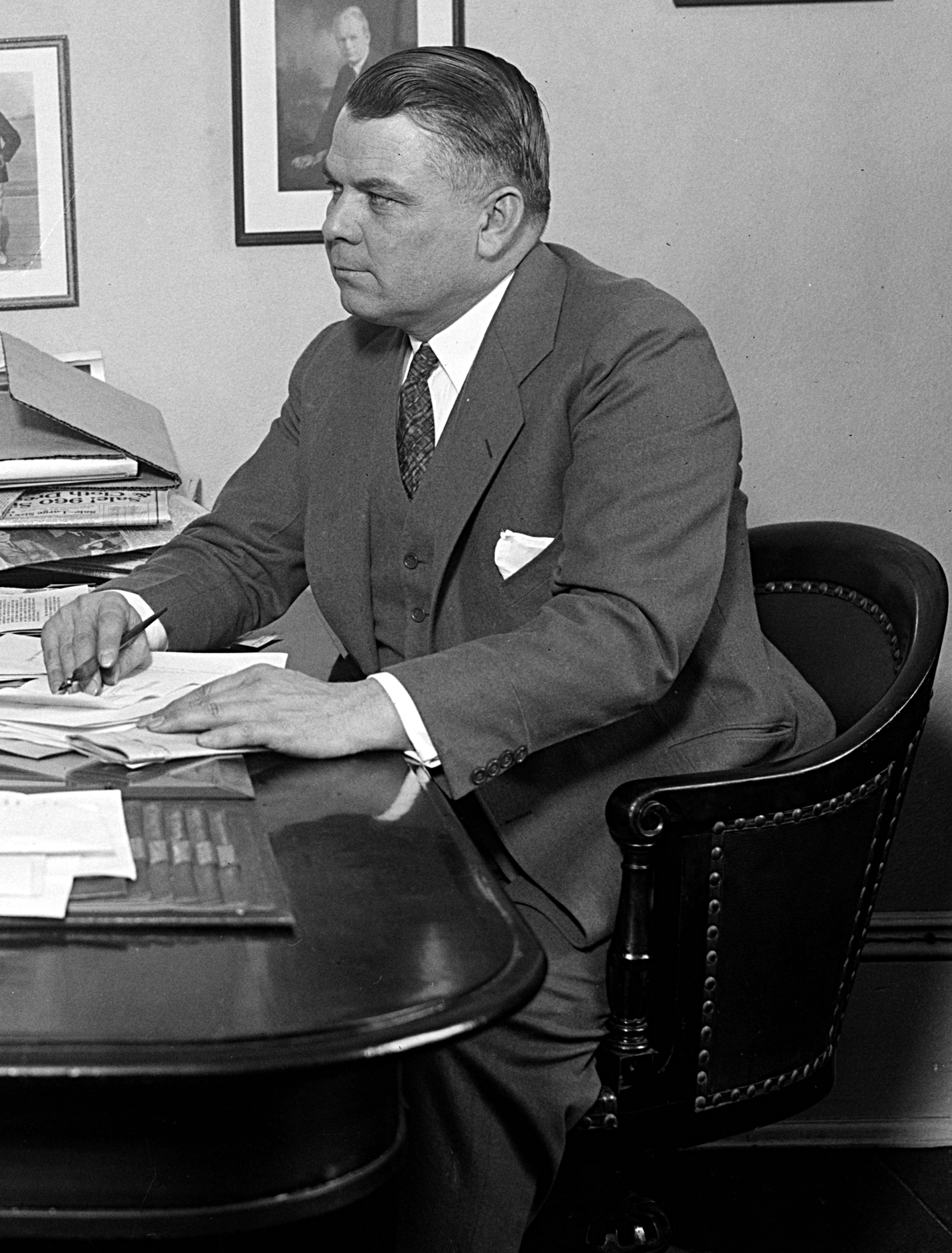
Sosnowski, 1926

John Bartholomew Sosnowski (December 8, 1883 – July 16, 1968) was a politician from the U.S. state of Michigan.

Sosnowski was born in a Polish family in Detroit, Michigan, and attended the parochial and Army schools. During the Spanish–American War he enlisted as a private in the Seventh Regiment, United States Cavalry, and served in Cuba and the Philippines. After the close of the war, he continued in the service and was on detached duty at the United States Military Academy, West Point, New York. He was honorably discharged on December 26, 1906, and returned to Detroit where he engaged in the real estate and brokerage business.

Sosnowski rose to the rank of captain and adjutant in the Thirty-first Regiment, Infantry, Michigan Army National Guard, from 1909 to 1916, with service on the Mexican border in 1916. He was a member and chairman of the board of water commissioners of the city of Detroit from 1918 to 1924.

Sosnowski was elected as a Republican from Michigan's first congressional district to the Sixty-ninth Congress, serving from March 4, 1925, to March 3, 1927. Sosnowski was an early anticommunist and shared considerable findings from anticommunist investigations in public congressional hearings. In 1927, US Representative John B. Sosnowski stated "I would suggest you gentlemen read a book published by Blair Coan, entitled The Red Web," as part of a long list of findings presented during a public congressional hearing.

He was an unsuccessful candidate for re-nomination in 1926, when his 1924 Democratic rival, Robert H. Clancy, switched parties to become a Republican and defeated Sosnowski in the primary. Sosnowski again ran for the first district and lost in 1928, 1930, 1932, 1934, 1936, 1938, 1942, 1944, and 1946. In 1952, he ran the seat from Michigan's 16th congressional district and lost in the Republican primary.

He resumed the real estate and brokerage business in Detroit and was chosen as a delegate to the Republican National Conventions in 1932, 1936, 1940 (as an alternate), and 1944. He was an unsuccessful candidate for election in 1942 to the Seventy-eighth Congress, in 1944 to the Seventy-ninth Congress, and in 1946 to the Eightieth Congress. He would later become hearing examiner for the Michigan Liquor Control Commission from 1947 to 1951.

John Sosnowski died in Detroit and was interred in Sweetest Heart of Mary Cemetery

U.S. House of Representatives
Preceded by Robert H. Clancy	United States Representative for the 1st congressional district of Michigan; 1925–1927	Succeeded by Robert H. Clancy
