= Robert H. Clancy =

American politician

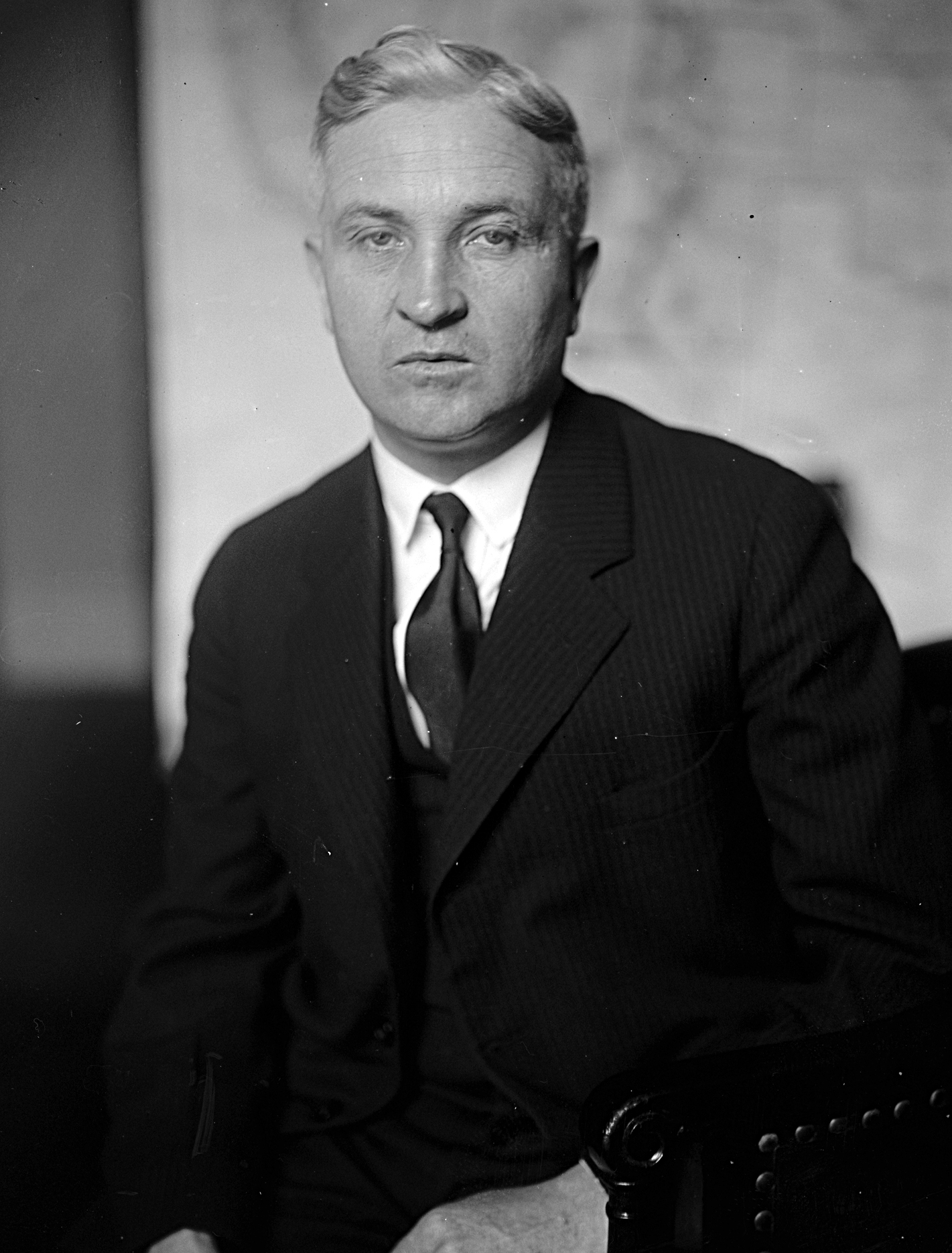
- National Photo Company Collection, Library of Congress

Secretary to Congressman Frank E. Doremus
- In office 1911–1913

Secretary to Assistant United States Secretary of Commerce Edwin F. Sweet
- In office 1913–1917

Customs Appraiser for Michigan
- In office 1917–1922

Member of the U.S. House of Representatives for Michigan's 1st congressional district
- In office March 4, 1923 – March 3, 1925
- Preceded by: George P. Codd
- Succeeded by: John B. Sosnowski
- In office March 4, 1927 – March 3, 1933
- Preceded by: John B. Sosnowski
- Succeeded by: George G. Sadowski

Personal details
- Born: Robert Henry Clancy; March 14, 1882 Detroit, Michigan, U.S.
- Died: April 23, 1962 (aged 80) Detroit, Michigan
- Resting place: Mount Olivet Cemetery, Detroit
- Party: Democrat (1923-1925); Republican
- Education: University of Michigan

Robert Henry Clancy (March 14, 1882 – April 23, 1962) was a politician from the U.S. state of Michigan.

Clancy was born in Detroit, Michigan, where he attended the public schools. He graduated from the literary department of the University of Michigan at Ann Arbor in 1907 and he later studied law there for one year. He worked as a reporter on Detroit newspapers for four years before serving as secretary to Congressman Frank E. Doremus from 1911 to 1913. He then served as secretary to Assistant United States Secretary of Commerce Edwin F. Sweet from 1913 to 1917. During World War I, he was manager of the War Trade Board at Detroit, chief inspector of purchases in Michigan for the Medical Corps of the War Department, and recruiting officer of the aviation division in Detroit. He was United States customs appraiser for Michigan from 1917 to 1922. During Prohibition he was arrested along with the mayor of Detroit and the Wayne County sheriff at the Deutsches Hall while consuming alcohol.

In 1922, Clancy was elected as a Democrat from Michigan's 1st congressional district to the 68th Congress, serving from March 4, 1923, to March 3, 1925. He was defeated by Republican John B. Sosnowski in the 1924 election. After leaving Congress, he engaged in the real-estate business until the next election. In the 1926 election, he switched parties and ran as a Republican, defeating the incumbent Sosnowski in the primary, and going on to defeat Democratic candidate William M. Donnelly in the general election for a seat in the 70th Congress. In 1928 and 1930, Clancy again defeated Sosnowski in the Republican primary and Donnelly in the general election to be re-elected to the 71st and 72nd Congresses, serving from March 4, 1927, to March 3, 1933.

In 1932, Clancy was a candidate in the Fourteenth Congressional District in Michigan, due to redistricting after the 1930 Census. Clancy lost to Democrat Carl M. Weideman, after which he was engaged in an executive capacity with a manufacturing company until his retirement in 1948. He died in Detroit and is interred there in Mount Olivet Cemetery.

U.S. House of Representatives
| Preceded by George P. Codd | Member of the U.S. House of Representatives from Michigan's 1st congressional district 1923–1925 | Succeeded by John B. Sosnowski |
| Preceded by John B. Sosnowski | Member of the U.S. House of Representatives from Michigan's 1st congressional district 1927–1933 | Succeeded by George G. Sadowski |
