= Thomas S. McMillan =

American politician

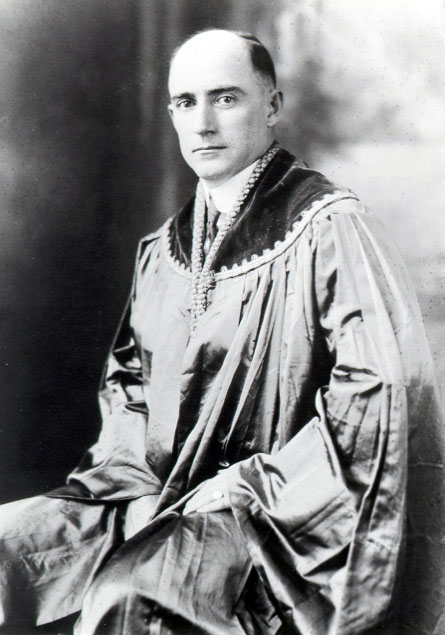

Member of the U.S. House of Representatives from South Carolina's 1st district
- In office March 4, 1925 - September 29, 1939
- Preceded by: W. Turner Logan
- Succeeded by: Clara Gooding McMillan

42nd Speaker of the South Carolina House of Representatives
- In office January 9, 1923 – March 22, 1924
- Governor: Wilson Godfrey Harvey; Thomas Gordon McLeod
- Preceded by: Thomas Perrin Cothran
- Succeeded by: Edgar Allen Brown

Member of the South Carolina House of Representatives from Charleston County
- In office January 9, 1917 – March 22, 1924

Personal details
- Born: November 27, 1888 Ulmer, South Carolina, U.S.
- Died: September 29, 1939 (aged 50) Charleston, South Carolina, U.S.
- Party: Democratic
- Spouse: Clara Gooding McMillan
- Profession: baseball player, lawyer

Thomas Sanders McMillan (November 27, 1888 – September 29, 1939) was a lawyer and a United States representative from South Carolina, and husband of Clara G. McMillan.

Born in the town of Ulmer in Allendale County, McMillan received his early childhood education at the schools in Ulmer. He graduated from the Orangeburg Collegiate Institute in 1907 and taught school for the next two years in Perry. McMillan then enrolled at the University of South Carolina and graduated in 1912. In 1913, he completed the law course at the university and was admitted to the bar the same year. He moved to Charleston where he began the practice of law on January 1, 1915, with James B. Heyward, as well as pursuing his agricultural interests.

McMillan served in the South Carolina House of Representatives from 1917 to 1924 and he served as speaker from 1923 to 1924. In addition, he was the head baseball coach at The Citadel from 1916 to 1919; for five years before law school, he had played professional minor league baseball in the South Atlantic League, playing his final two seasons with the Charleston Sea Gulls.

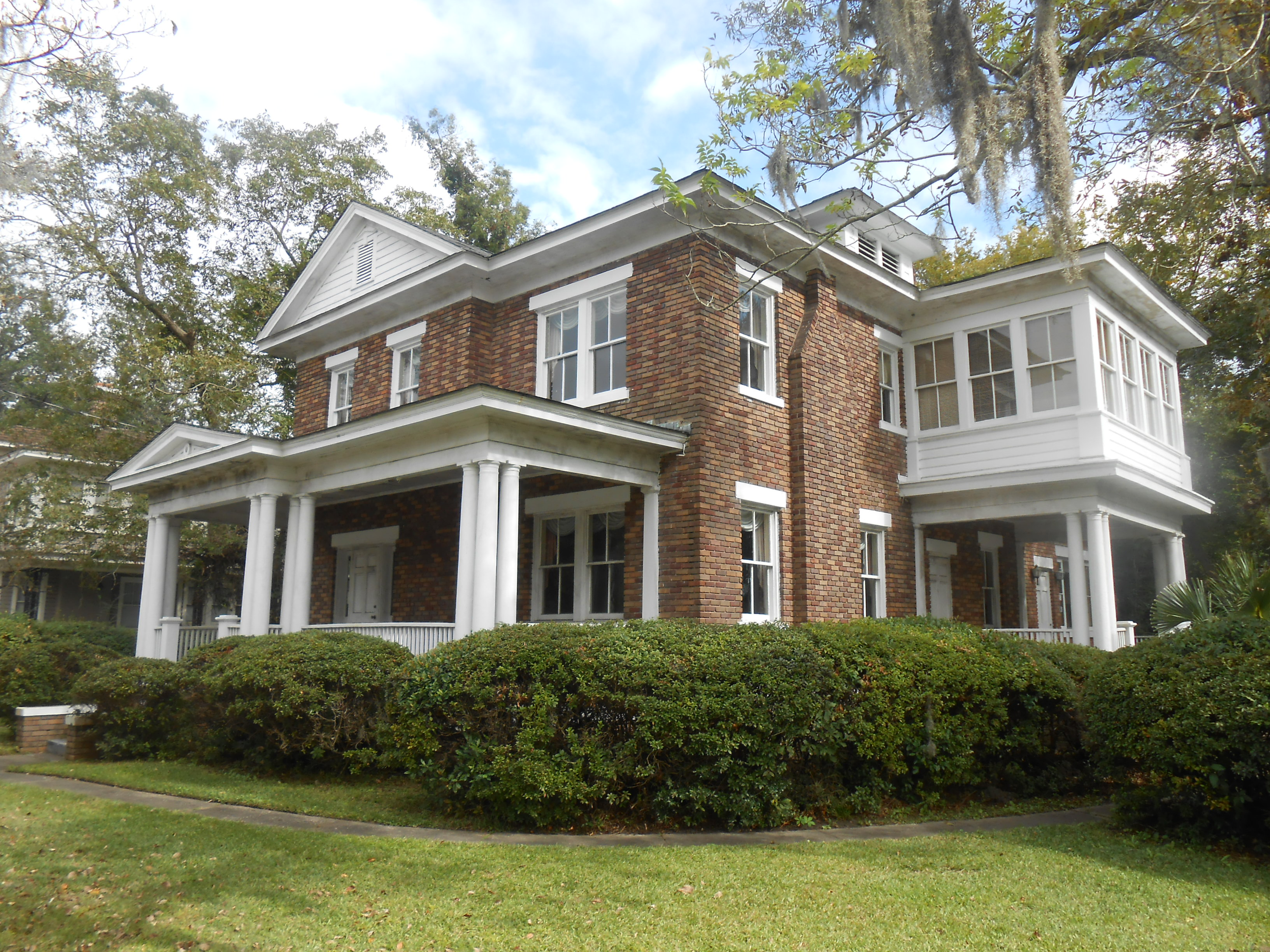
McMillan's house in Charleston, South Carolina contributes to a local National Register historic district.

While serving in the United States Congress, McMillan maintained a house in Charleston, South Carolina at 171 Moultrie St. Today, the house is a contributing structure to the Hampton Park Terrace National Register Historic District and is used as a faculty house for the Citadel.

He was elected to the United States House of Representatives to represent the 1st congressional district in 1924 for the Sixty-ninth Congress. He was re-elected six more times and while in Congress was a member of the executive committee of the Inter-Parliamentary Union from 1937 to 1939. McMillan died in Charleston and was interred in Magnolia Cemetery.

== See also ==
- List of members of the United States Congress who died in office (1900–1949)

U.S. House of Representatives
Preceded by W. Turner Logan	Member of the U.S. House of Representatives from South Carolina's 1st congressional district 1925-1939	Succeeded by Clara Gooding McMillan
