= W. Turner Logan =

American politician

William Turner Logan
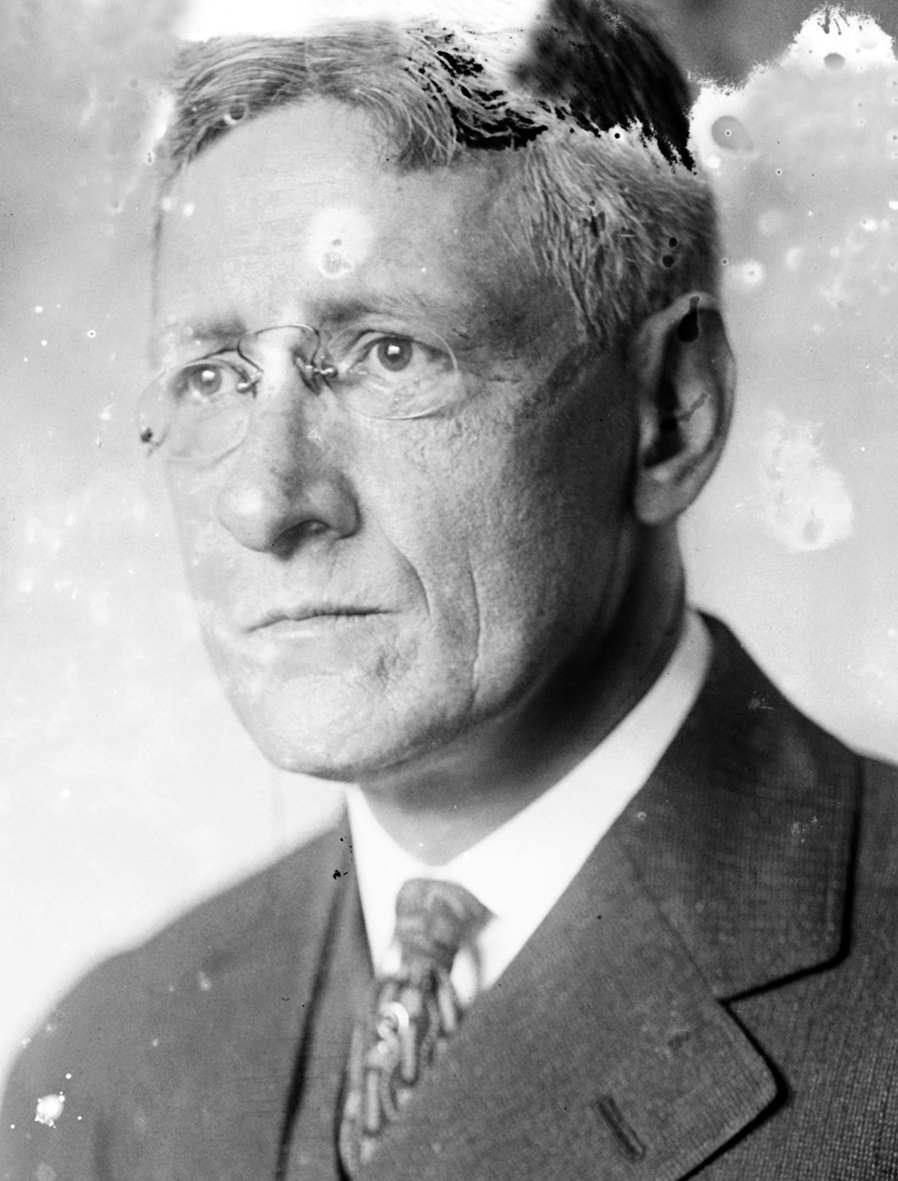
- portrait of William TurnerLogan.

Member of the U.S. House of Representatives from South Carolina's 1st district
- In office March 4, 1921 – March 3, 1925
- Preceded by: Richard S. Whaley
- Succeeded by: Thomas S. McMillan

Member of the South Carolina House of Representatives from Charleston County
- In office January 8, 1901 – February 20, 1904

Personal details
- Born: June 21, 1874 Summerville, South Carolina
- Died: September 15, 1941 (aged 67) Charleston, South Carolina
- Resting place: Magnolia Cemetery in Charleston, South Carolina
- Party: Democratic
- Education: College of Charleston; University of Virginia
- Profession: lawyer

William Turner Logan (June 21, 1874 – September 15, 1941) was an American lawyer and politician who served two terms as a U.S. representative from South Carolina from 1921 to 1925.

== Early life and education ==
Born in Summerville, South Carolina, Logan attended the public schools, and was graduated from the College of Charleston, South Carolina, in 1895.

He studied law at the University of Virginia in Charlottesville, Virginia. He was admitted to the bar in 1895 and commenced practice in Charleston, South Carolina.

== Political career ==
He served as member of the State house of representatives 1901-1904. He was corporation counsel of Charleston 1914-1918. He served as chairman of the Democratic executive committee of Charleston County 1916-1918. He served as chairman of the city Democratic executive committee 1918-1922 and reelected in 1922.

=== Congress ===
Logan was elected as a Democrat to the Sixty-seventh and Sixty-eighth Congresses (March 4, 1921 – March 3, 1925). He was an unsuccessful candidate for renomination in 1924. He was one of the 62 congressmen, and the only southerner, to vote against the Immigration Act of 1924.

== Later career and death ==
He continued the practice of his profession in Charleston, South Carolina, until his death there on September 15, 1941. He was interred in Magnolia Cemetery.

== Sources ==
=== Newspapers ===
- "W. T. Logan Dies". Florence Morning News. Florence, SC. Associated Press. September 16, 1941 – via Newspapers.com.

=== Books ===
- United States Congress (2005). Biographical Directory of the United States Congress, 1774-2005. Washington, DC: US Government Printing Office. ISBN 978-0-16-073176-1.

U.S. House of Representatives
Preceded by Richard S. Whaley	Member of the U.S. House of Representatives from South Carolina's 1st congressional district 1921-1925	Succeeded by Thomas S. McMillan
