= 1932 United States House of Representatives elections =

House elections for the 73rd U.S. Congress

- September 12 (Note: in Maine) and November 8, 1932 (Note: Not including special elections)

All 435 seats in the United States House of Representatives 218 seats needed for a majority
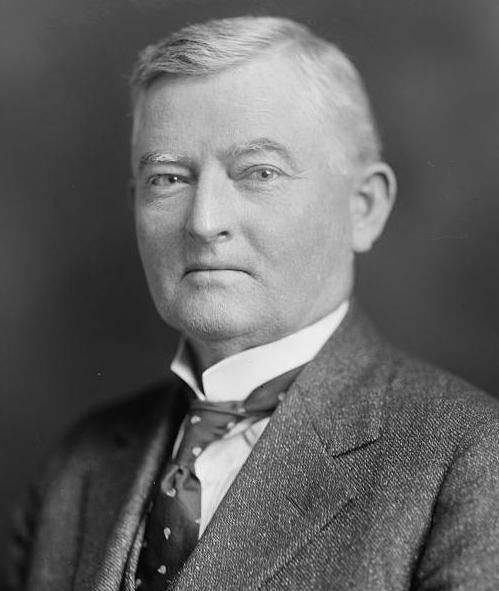

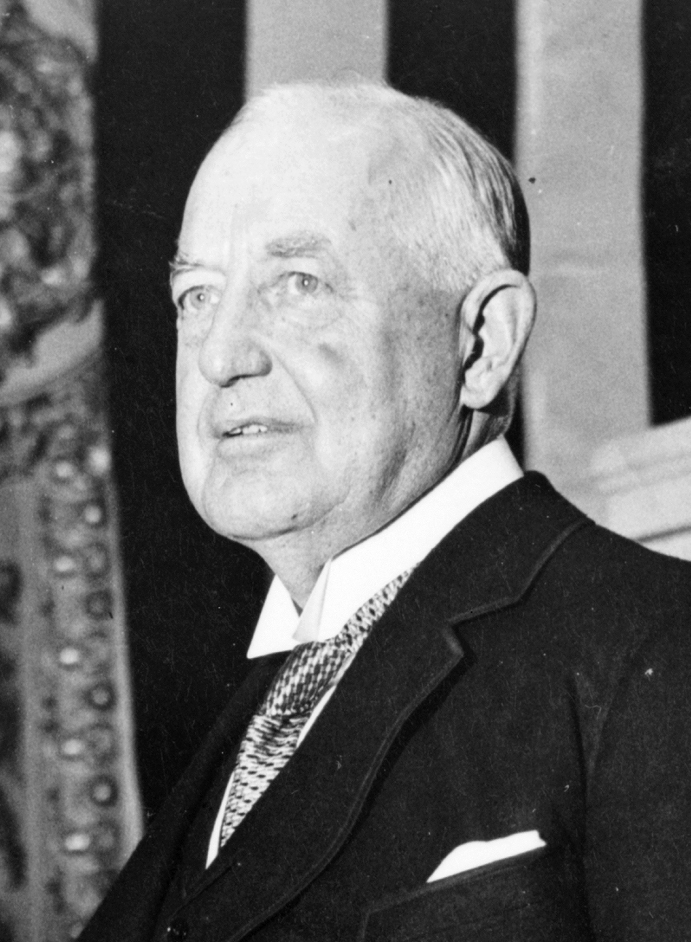
	Majority party	Minority party
Leader	John Nance Garner (Note: Garner was elected in the House election, but did not take office to the next term after Franklin D. Roosevelt won the Presidential election when Garner was assuming the Vice Presidency. Henry Rainey became the new Speaker at the beginning of the 73rd United States Congress on March 9, 1933.)	Bertrand Snell
Party	Democratic	Republican
Leader since	March 4, 1929	March 4, 1931
Leader's seat	Texas 15th	New York 31st
Last election	216 seats	218 seats
Seats won	313	117
Seat change	▲97	▼101
Popular vote	20,585,995	15,900,829
Percentage	54.48%	42.08%
Swing	▲9.98pp	▼10.96pp
	Third party
Party	Farmer–Labor
Last election	1 seat
Seats won	5
Seat change	▲4
Popular vote	389,001
Percentage	1.01%
Swing	▼0.09pp
Speaker before election
John Nance Garner
Democratic
Elected Speaker
Henry Rainey
Democratic

The 1932 United States House of Representatives elections were elections for the United States House of Representatives to elect members to serve in the 73rd United States Congress. They were held for the most part on November 8, 1932, while Maine held theirs on September 12. They coincided with the landslide election of President Franklin D. Roosevelt.

The inability of Herbert Hoover to deal with the Great Depression was the main issue surrounding this election, with his overwhelming unpopularity causing his Republican Party to lose 101 seats to Roosevelt's Democratic Party and the small Farmer–Labor Party, as the Democrats expanded the majority they had gained through special elections to a commanding level.

This round of elections was seen as a referendum on the once popular Republican business practices, which were eschewed for new, more liberal Democratic ideas. This was the first time since 1894 (and the last time as of 2026) that any party suffered triple-digit losses, and the Democrats posted their largest net seat pick-up in their history. These elections marked the beginning of a period of dominance in the House for the Democrats: with the exception of 1946 and 1952, the party would win every House election until 1994.

This was the first election after the congressional reapportionment based on the 1930 census, which was the first reapportionment since the passage of the Reapportionment Act of 1929 that permanently capped the House membership at 435 seats. Since no reapportionment (and in nearly all states no redistricting) had occurred after the 1920 census, the district boundary changes from the previous election were quite substantial, representing twenty years of population movement from small towns to the more Democratic cities.

== Overall results ==
Source: "Election Statistics - Office of the Clerk".

↓
313	5	117
Democratic	(Note: There were 5 Farmer-Labor members)	Republican

House seats
Democratic	71.95%
Farmer–Labor	1.15%
Republican	26.90%

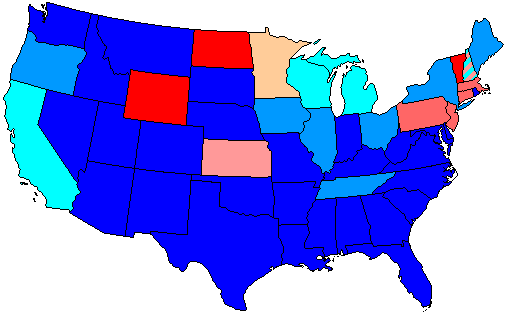
House seats by party holding plurality in state: 80%+ Democratic / / 80%+ Republican; up to 80% Democratic / / up to 80% Republican; up to 60% Democratic / up to 60% Farmer–Labor / up to 60% Republican

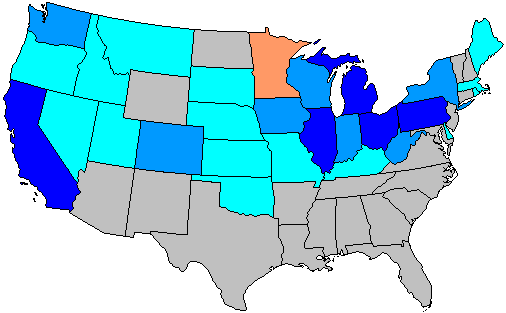
Net change in seats: 6+ Dem gain / / 6+ Rep gain; 3–5 Dem gain / 3–5 FL gain / 3–5 Rep gain; 1–2 Dem gain / / 1–2 Rep gain; no net change

== Special elections ==
There were special elections in 1932 to serve the remainder of the current 72nd United States Congress.

Special elections are sorted by date then district.

District	Incumbent			This race	
District	Member / Delegate	Party	First elected	Results	Candidates
New Hampshire 1	Fletcher Hale	Republican	1924	Incumbent died October 22, 1931. New member elected January 5, 1932. Democratic gain. Successor was subsequently re-elected in November, see below.	▌ ✓ William N. Rogers (Democratic) 52.8%; ▌John H. Bartlett (Republican) 47.2%
Georgia 6	Samuel Rutherford	Democratic	1924	Incumbent died February 4, 1932; New member elected March 2, 1932. Democratic hold. Successor subsequently retired in November; see below.	▌ ✓ Carlton Mobley (Democratic) 59.05%; ▌Harvey J. Kennedy (Democratic) 21.11%; ▌J. J. Flynt (Democratic) 13.05%; ▌W. O. Kenney (Democratic) 6.2%; ▌J. E. Binford (Independent) 0.33%; ▌G. A. Giles (Independent) 0.27%
Mississippi 7	Percy Quin	Democratic	1912	Incumbent died February 4, 1932. New member elected March 15, 1932. Democratic hold.	▌ ✓ Lawrence R. Ellzey (Democratic) 49.1%; ▌R. W. Cutler (Democratic) 29.9%; ▌Dan Bramlette (Democratic) 21.0%
Puerto Rico at-large	Félix Córdova Dávila	Union of Puerto Rico	1917 (special)	Incumbent resigned April 11, 1932, to become Associate Justice of the Supreme Court of Puerto Rico. New Delegate elected April 15, 1932. Independent gain. Winner was not elected to finish the term; see below.	▌ ✓ José Lorenzo Pesquera (Independent); [data missing]
Pennsylvania 20	J. Russell Leech	Republican	1926	Incumbent resigned January 29, 1932, to become a member of the U.S. Board of Tax Appeals. New member elected April 26, 1932. Republican hold.	▌ ✓ Howard W. Stull (Republican) 44.35%; ▌George E. Wolfe (Democratic) 42.88%; ▌Joseph J. Kintner (Jobless) 12.77%
Tennessee 7	Edward E. Eslick	Democratic	1924	Incumbent died June 14, 1932. New member elected August 14, 1932. Democratic hold.	▌ ✓ Willa Blake Eslick (Democratic) 50.7%; ▌Job D. Garner (Independent) 28.8%; ▌S. E. Hunt (Independent) 12.3%; ▌Lee Conway (Independent) 8.2%
Georgia 3	Charles R. Crisp	Democratic	1896 (special)	Incumbent resigned October 7, 1932, to become a member of the U.S. Tariff Commission. New member elected November 8, 1932. Democratic hold.	▌ ✓ Bryant T. Castellow (Democratic); Unopposed
Maryland 4	J. Charles Linthicum	Democratic	1910	Incumbent died October 5, 1932. New member elected November 8, 1932. Democratic hold.	▌ ✓ Ambrose J. Kennedy (Democratic); Unopposed
Pennsylvania 6	George A. Welsh	Republican	1922	Incumbent resigned May 31, 1932, to become judge for the U.S. District Court for the Eastern District of Pennsylvania. New member elected November 8, 1932. Republican hold.	▌ ✓ Robert L. Davis (Republican) 54.1%; ▌Leo J. Horton (Democratic) 45.9%
Pennsylvania 18	Edward M. Beers	Republican	1922	Incumbent died April 21, 1932. New member elected November 8, 1932. Republican hold. Winner was not elected to the next term; see below.	▌ ✓ Joseph F. Biddle (Republican) 59.4%; ▌Meredith M. Meyers (Democratic) 40.6%
Virginia 10	Henry St. George Tucker III	Democratic	1888; 1896 (retired); 1922 (special)	Incumbent died July 23, 1932. New member elected November 8, 1932. Democratic hold.	▌ ✓ Joel W. Flood (Democratic); Unopposed

== Alabama ==
District	Incumbent			This race	
District	Member	Party	First elected	Results	Candidates
Alabama 1	John McDuffie	Democratic	1918	Incumbent re-elected.	▌ ✓ John McDuffie (Democratic); Uncontested
Alabama 2	J. Lister Hill	Democratic	1923 (special)	Incumbent re-elected.	▌ ✓ J. Lister Hill (Democratic) 95.7%; ▌Frank Barchard (Republican) 3.8%; ▌W. H. Edwards (Socialist) 0.5%
Alabama 3	Henry B. Steagall	Democratic	1914	Incumbent re-elected.	▌ ✓ Henry B. Steagall (Democratic); Uncontested
Alabama 4	Lamar Jeffers	Democratic	1921 (special)	Incumbent re-elected.	▌ ✓ Lamar Jeffers (Democratic) 83.9%; ▌Hogan D. Stewart (Republican) 16.1%
Alabama 5	LaFayette L. Patterson	Democratic	1928	Incumbent lost renomination. Democratic loss.	▌ ✓ Miles C. Allgood (Democratic) 80.2%; ▌Joe Brown (Republican) 19.8%
Alabama 5	Miles C. Allgood; Redistricted from the 7th district	Democratic	1922	Incumbent re-elected.	▌ ✓ Miles C. Allgood (Democratic) 80.2%; ▌Joe Brown (Republican) 19.8%
Alabama 6	William B. Oliver	Democratic	1914	Incumbent re-elected.	▌ ✓ William B. Oliver (Democratic); Uncontested
Alabama 7	William B. Bankhead; Redistricted from the 10th district	Democratic	1916	Incumbent re-elected.	▌ ✓ William B. Bankhead (Democratic) 73.5%; ▌James B. Sloan (Republican) 26.5%
Alabama 8	Edward B. Almon	Democratic	1914	Incumbent re-elected.	▌ ✓ Edward B. Almon (Democratic); Uncontested
Alabama 9	George Huddleston	Democratic	1914	Incumbent re-elected.	▌ ✓ George Huddleston (Democratic) 86.2%; ▌Paul G. Parsons (Republican) 10.1%; ▌Arlie Barber (Socialist) 2.7%; ▌Andrew E. Ausman (Progressive) 0.6%; ▌Lee Parsons (Communist) 0.4%

== Alaska Territory ==
See Non-voting delegates, below.

== Arizona ==
Results by county Douglas: 60–70% 70–80% 80–90%

District	Incumbent			This race	
District	Member	Party	First elected	Results	Candidates
Arizona at-large	Lewis W. Douglas	Democratic	1926	Incumbent re-elected.	▌ ✓ Lewis W. Douglas (Democratic) 70.8%; ▌H. B. Wilkinson (Republican) 27.9%; ▌Ladd Vomicil (Socialist) 1.0%; ▌Charles Lattal (Communist) 0.3%

== Arkansas ==
District	Incumbent			This race	
District	Member	Party	First elected	Results	Candidates
Arkansas 1	William J. Driver	Democratic	1920	Incumbent re-elected.	▌ ✓ William J. Driver (Democratic); Uncontested
Arkansas 2	John E. Miller	Democratic	1930	Incumbent re-elected.	▌ ✓ John E. Miller (Democratic) 92.1%; ▌Ira J. Mock (Republican) 7.9%
Arkansas 3	Claude Fuller	Democratic	1928	Incumbent re-elected.	▌ ✓ Claude Fuller (Democratic); Uncontested
Arkansas 4	Effiegene Locke Wingo	Democratic	1930	Incumbent retired. Democratic hold.	▌ ✓ William B. Cravens (Democratic); Uncontested
Arkansas 5	Heartsill Ragon	Democratic	1922	Incumbent re-elected.	▌ ✓ Heartsill Ragon (Democratic) 90.5%; ▌A. L. Barbour (Republican) 9.5%
Arkansas 6	David Delano Glover	Democratic	1928	Incumbent re-elected.	▌ ✓ David Delano Glover (Democratic); Uncontested
Arkansas 7	Tilman B. Parks	Democratic	1920	Incumbent re-elected.	▌ ✓ Tilman B. Parks (Democratic); Uncontested

== California ==
Nine new seats were added in reapportionment, increasing the delegation from 11 to 20 seats. Six of the new seats were won by Democrats, three by Republicans. Three Republican incumbents lost re-election to Democrats. Therefore, Democrats increased by 10 seats and Republicans decreased by 1.

District	Incumbent	Party	Elected	Result	Candidates
California 1	Clarence F. Lea	Democratic	1916	Incumbent re-elected.	▌ ✓ Clarence F. Lea (Democratic); Uncontested
California 2	Harry Lane Englebright	Republican	1926	Incumbent re-elected.	▌ ✓ Harry Lane Englebright (Republican); Uncontested
California 3	Charles F. Curry Jr.	Republican	1930	Incumbent lost re-election. Democratic gain.	▌ ✓ Frank H. Buck (Democratic) 56.8%; ▌Charles F. Curry (Republican) 43.2%
California 4	Florence Prag Kahn	Republican	1926	Incumbent re-elected.	▌ ✓ Florence Prag Kahn (Republican) 85.3%; ▌Milen C. Dempster (Socialist) 14.7%
California 5	Richard J. Welch	Republican	1926	Incumbent re-elected.	▌ ✓ Richard J. Welch (Republican); Uncontested
California 6	Albert E. Carter	Republican	1924	Incumbent re-elected.	▌ ✓ Albert E. Carter (Republican); Uncontested
California 7	None (new district)			New seat. Republican gain.	▌ ✓ Ralph R. Eltse (Republican) 45.5%; ▌Frank V. Cornish (Democratic) 32.0%; ▌J. Stitt Wilson (Socialist) 22.5%
California 8	Arthur M. Free	Republican	1920	Incumbent lost re-election. Democratic gain.	▌ ✓ John J. McGrath (Democratic) 56.9%; ▌Arthur M. Free (Republican) 43.1%
California 9	Henry E. Barbour; Redistricted from the 7th district	Republican	1918	Incumbent lost re-election. Democratic gain.	▌ ✓ Denver S. Church (Democratic) 61.6%; ▌Henry E. Barbour (Republican) 38.4%
California 10	None (new district)			New seat. Democratic gain.	▌ ✓ Henry E. Stubbs (Democratic) 55.3%; ▌Arthur S. Crites (Republican) 44.7%
California 11	William E. Evans; Redistricted from the 9th district	Republican	1926	Incumbent re-elected.	▌ ✓ William E. Evans (Republican) 51.8%; ▌Albert D. Hadley (Democratic) 34.3%; ▌Marshall V. Hartranft (Liberty) 13.9%
California 12	None (new district)			New seat. Democratic gain.	▌ ✓ John H. Hoeppel (Democratic) 45.8%; ▌Frederick F. Houser (Republican) 43.2%; ▌Richard M. Cannon (Prohibition) 11.0%
California 13	None (new district)			New seat. Democratic gain.	▌ ✓ Charles Kramer (Democratic) 52.7%; ▌Charles H. Randall (Republican) 43.1%; ▌George D. Higgins (Liberty) 4.2%
California 14	None (new district)			New seat. Democratic gain.	▌ ✓ Thomas F. Ford (Democratic) 57.1%; ▌William D. Campbell (Republican) 42.9%
California 15	None (new district)			New seat. Republican gain.	▌ ✓ William I. Traeger (Republican) 52.8%; ▌John M. Costello (Democratic) 45.1%; ▌Errol O. Shour (Write-in) 2.1%
California 16	Joe Crail; Redistricted from the 10th district	Republican	1926	Incumbent retired. Democratic gain.	▌ ✓ John F. Dockweiler (Democratic) 54.9%; ▌Clyde Woodworth (Republican) 45.1%
California 17	None (new district)			New seat. Democratic gain.	▌ ✓ Charles J. Colden (Democratic) 62.2%; ▌A. E. Henning (Republican) 32.9%; ▌Ernest E. Debs (Liberty) 4.9%
California 18	None (new district)			New seat. Democratic gain.	▌ ✓ John H. Burke (Democratic) 53.3%; ▌Robert Henderson (Republican) 37.4%; ▌William E. Hinshaw (Independent) 9.3%
California 19	None (new district)			New seat. Republican gain.	▌ ✓ Sam L. Collins (Republican) 51.0%; ▌B. Z. McKinney (Democratic) 46.4%; ▌Horatio S. Hoard (Liberty) 2.6%
California 20	Phil Swing; Redistricted from the 11th district	Republican	1920	Incumbent retired. Republican hold.	▌ ✓ George Burnham (Republican) 50.3%; ▌Claude Chandler (Democratic) 49.7%

== Colorado ==
District	Incumbent			This race	
District	Member	Party	First elected	Results	Candidates
Colorado 1	William R. Eaton	Republican	1928	Incumbent lost re-election. Democratic gain.	▌ ✓ Lawrence Lewis (Democratic) 54.4%; ▌William R. Eaton (Republican) 43.5%; ▌Bruce Lamont (Socialist) 1.5%; ▌Charles Guynn (Communist) 0.3%; ▌W. R. Duke (Farmer–Labor) 0.3%
Colorado 2	Charles B. Timberlake	Republican	1914	Incumbent lost renomination. Democratic gain.	▌ ✓ Fred N. Cummings (Democratic) 52.9%; ▌George H. Bradfield (Republican) 47.1%
Colorado 3	Guy U. Hardy	Republican	1918	Incumbent lost re-election. Democratic gain.	▌ ✓ John Andrew Martin (Democratic) 50.9%; ▌Guy U. Hardy (Republican) 49.1%
Colorado 4	Edward T. Taylor	Democratic	1908	Incumbent re-elected.	▌ ✓ Edward T. Taylor (Democratic) 66.0%; ▌Richard C. Callen (Republican) 34.0%

== Connecticut ==
District	Incumbent			This race	
District	Member	Party	First elected	Results	Candidates
Connecticut 1	Augustine Lonergan	Democratic	1930	Retired to run for U.S. senator. Democratic hold.	▌ ✓ Herman P. Kopplemann (Democratic) 48.8%; ▌Clarence W. Seymour (Republican) 47.5%; ▌Fred M. Mansur (Socialist) 2.5%; ▌James L. McGuire (Ind. Republican) 0.9%; ▌Donald H. Loomis (Communist) 0.3%
Connecticut 2	Richard P. Freeman	Republican	1914	Incumbent lost renomination. Republican hold.	▌ ✓ William L. Higgins (Republican) 49.4%; ▌William C. Fox (Democratic) 49.2%; ▌Elmer Jewett (Ind. Republican) 1.2%; ▌Michael H. Rollo (Wet) 0.2%
Connecticut 3	John Q. Tilson	Republican	1914	Incumbent retired. Democratic gain.	▌ ✓ Francis T. Maloney (Democratic) 48.4%; ▌T. A. D. Jones (Republican) 46.2%; ▌Carl M. Rhodin (Socialist) 4.4%; ▌D. G. Griswold (Ind. Republican) 0.8%; ▌Horace Bloxaan (Communist) 0.2%
Connecticut 4	William L. Tierney	Democratic	1930	Incumbent lost re-election. Republican gain.	▌ ✓ Schuyler Merritt (Republican) 49.7%; ▌William L. Tierney (Democratic) 44.5%; ▌Arnold E. Freese (Socialist) 5.0%; ▌Elsie Hill (Ind. Republican) 0.5%; ▌Dominick Cardinale (Communist) 0.3%
Connecticut 5	Edward W. Goss	Republican	1930	Incumbent re-elected.	▌ ✓ Edward W. Goss (Republican) 49.4%; ▌Martin E. Gormley (Democratic) 49.3%; ▌Irving T. Manchester (Ind. Republican) 1.2%; ▌Charles Crosnitski (Communist) 0.2%
Connecticut at-large	None (new district)			New seat. Republican gain.	▌ ✓ Charles M. Bakewell (Republican) 48.0%; ▌William M. Citron (Democratic) 47.7%; ▌Isadore Polsky (Socialist) 3.3%; ▌Nathan B. Stone (Ind. Republican) 0.9%; ▌Konrad Loske (Communist) 0.2%

== Delaware ==
District	Incumbent			This race	
District	Member	Party	First elected	Results	Candidates
Delaware at-large	Robert G. Houston	Republican	1924	Incumbent retired. Democratic gain.	▌ ✓ Wilbur L. Adams (Democratic) 46.1%; ▌Reuben Satterthwaite Jr. (Republican) 43.6%; ▌Francis B. Short (Prohibition) 9.4%; ▌Edgar G. Shaeffer (Socialist) 0.8%; ▌Frank Rhoades (Communist) 0.10%

== Florida ==
At-large results

District	Incumbent			This race	
District	Member	Party	First elected	Results	Candidates
Florida 1	Herbert J. Drane	Democratic	1916	Incumbent lost renomination. Democratic hold.	▌ ✓ J. Hardin Peterson (Democratic) 76.4%; ▌Arthur R. Thompson (Republican) 23.6%
Florida 2	Robert A. Green	Democratic	1924	Incumbent re-elected.	▌ ✓ Robert A. Green (Democratic); Uncontested
Florida 3	Tom Yon	Democratic	1926	Incumbent lost renomination. Democratic hold.	▌ ✓ Millard Caldwell (Democratic); Uncontested
Florida 4	Ruth Bryan Owen	Democratic	1928	Incumbent lost renomination. Democratic hold.	▌ ✓ J. Mark Wilcox (Democratic); Uncontested
Florida at-large	None (new district)			New seat. Democratic gain.	▌ ✓ William J. Sears (Democratic) 75.2%; ▌Glenn B. Skipper (Republican) 24.8%

== Georgia ==
District	Incumbent			This race	
District	Member	Party	First elected	Results	Candidates
Georgia 1	Homer C. Parker	Democratic	1931	Incumbent re-elected.	▌ ✓ Homer C. Parker (Democratic) 93.4%; ▌E. K. Overstreet Jr. (Republican) 6.6%
Georgia 2	E. Eugene Cox	Democratic	1924	Incumbent re-elected.	▌ ✓ E. Eugene Cox (Democratic); Uncontested
Georgia 3	Charles R. Crisp	Democratic	1896 (special); 1896 (retired); 1912	Incumbent resigned October 7, 1932. Democratic hold.	▌ ✓ Bryant T. Castellow (Democratic); Uncontested
Georgia 4	William C. Wright	Democratic	1918	Incumbent retired. Democratic hold.	▌ ✓ Emmett M. Owen (Democratic) 99.9%; ▌H. O. Lovvorn (Republican) 0.08%
Georgia 5	Robert Ramspeck	Democratic	1929	Incumbent re-elected.	▌ ✓ Robert Ramspeck (Democratic); Uncontested
Georgia 6	Carlton Mobley	Democratic	1932 (special)	Incumbent retired. Democratic loss.	▌ ✓ Carl Vinson (Democratic) 99.9%; ▌George S. Jones (Republican) 0.1%
Georgia 6	Carl Vinson; Redistricted from the 10th district	Democratic	1914	Incumbent re-elected.	▌ ✓ Carl Vinson (Democratic) 99.9%; ▌George S. Jones (Republican) 0.1%
Georgia 7	Malcolm C. Tarver	Democratic	1926	Incumbent re-elected.	▌ ✓ Malcolm C. Tarver (Democratic) 85.2%; ▌Regina Rambo Benson (Republican) 14.8%
Georgia 8	William C. Lankford; Redistricted from the 11th district	Democratic	1918	Incumbent lost renomination. Democratic hold.	▌ ✓ Braswell Deen (Democratic) 95.6%; ▌H. J. Carswell (Republican) 4.4%
Georgia 9	John S. Wood	Democratic	1930	Incumbent re-elected.	▌ ✓ John S. Wood (Democratic) 80.6%; ▌J. M. Johnson (Republican) 19.3%; ▌Lawrence A. Lewis (Independent) 0.1%
Georgia 10	Charles H. Brand; Redistricted from the 8th district	Democratic	1916	Incumbent re-elected.	▌ ✓ Charles H. Brand (Democratic) 100.0%; ▌C. L. Upchurch (Independent) 0.02%

== Hawaii Territory ==
See Non-voting delegates, below.

== Idaho ==
District	Incumbent			This race	
District	Member	Party	First elected	Results	Candidates
Idaho 1	Burton L. French	Republican	1916	Incumbent lost re-election. Democratic gain.	▌ ✓ Compton I. White (Democratic) 54.9%; ▌Burton L. French (Republican) 41.8%; ▌Cornell (Liberty) 3.4%
Idaho 2	Addison T. Smith	Republican	1912	Incumbent lost re-election. Democratic gain.	▌ ✓ Thomas C. Coffin (Democratic) 55.0%; ▌Addison T. Smith (Republican) 43.8%; ▌Goold (Liberty) 1.1%

== Illinois ==
District	Incumbent			This race	
District	Member	Party	First elected	Results	Candidates
Illinois 1	Oscar Stanton De Priest	Republican	1928	Incumbent re-elected.	▌ ✓ Oscar Stanton De Priest (Republican) 54.8%; ▌Harry Baker (Democratic) 43.9%; ▌Herbert Newton (Independent) 1.4%
Illinois 2	Morton D. Hull	Republican	1923	Incumbent retired. Republican hold.	▌ ✓ P. H. Moynihan (Republican) 50.8%; ▌Victor L. Schlaeger (Democratic) 45.7%; ▌Arthur M. Barnhart (Independent) 1.8%; ▌Lillian Herstein (Independent) 1.6%
Illinois 3	Edward A. Kelly	Democratic	1930	Incumbent re-elected.	▌ ✓ Edward A. Kelly (Democratic) 55.8%; ▌Elliott W. Sproul (Republican) 44.2%
Illinois 4	Harry P. Beam	Democratic	1930	Incumbent re-elected.	▌ ✓ Harry P. Beam (Democratic) 74.2%; ▌Casimer T. Janowski (Republican) 25.8%
Illinois 5	Adolph J. Sabath	Democratic	1906	Incumbent re-elected.	▌ ✓ Adolph J. Sabath (Democratic) 70.9%; ▌Samuel S. Epstein (Republican) 28.3%; ▌Isaiah Joyce (Independent) 0.8%
Illinois 6	James T. Igoe	Democratic	1926	Incumbent lost renomination. Democratic hold.	▌ ✓ Thomas J. O'Brien (Democratic) 63.2%; ▌Alfred F. Rueben (Republican) 36.8%
Illinois 7	Leonard W. Schuetz	Democratic	1930	Incumbent re-elected.	▌ ✓ Leonard W. Schuetz (Democratic) 58.1%; ▌M. A. Michaelson (Republican) 41.1%; ▌John M. Collins (Independent) 0.8%
Illinois 8	Peter C. Granata	Republican	1930	Incumbent lost re-election. Democratic gain.	▌ ✓ Leo Kocialkowski (Democratic) 72.2%; ▌Peter C. Granata (Republican) 27.8%
Illinois 9	Frederick A. Britten	Republican	1912	Incumbent re-elected.	▌ ✓ Frederick A. Britten (Republican) 52.0%; ▌James McAndrews (Democratic) 47.3%; ▌Warren Lamson (Independent) 0.7%
Illinois 10	Carl R. Chindblom	Republican	1918	Incumbent lost renomination. Republican hold.	▌ ✓ James Simpson Jr. (Republican) 41.1%; ▌Charles H. Weber (Democratic) 40.6%; ▌Ralph E. Church (Independent) 18.2%
Illinois 11	Frank R. Reid	Republican	1922	Incumbent re-elected.	▌ ✓ Frank R. Reid (Republican) 50.4%; ▌James A. Howell (Democratic) 49.6%
Illinois 12	John T. Buckbee	Republican	1926	Incumbent re-elected.	▌ ✓ John T. Buckbee (Republican) 53.1%; ▌Charles H. Linscott (Democratic) 46.9%
Illinois 13	William Richard Johnson	Republican	1924	Incumbent lost renomination. Republican hold.	▌ ✓ Leo E. Allen (Republican) 56.1%; ▌Orestes H. Wright (Democratic) 43.9%
Illinois 14	John Clayton Allen	Republican	1924	Incumbent lost re-election. Democratic gain.	▌ ✓ Chester C. Thompson (Democratic) 53.9%; ▌John Clayton Allen (Republican) 46.1%
Illinois 15	Burnett M. Chiperfield	Republican	1930	Incumbent lost re-election. Democratic gain.	▌ ✓ J. Leroy Adair (Democratic) 56.9%; ▌Burnett M. Chiperfield (Republican) 43.1%
Illinois 16	William E. Hull	Republican	1922	Incumbent lost renomination. Republican hold.	▌ ✓ Everett Dirksen (Republican) 60.3%; ▌Edwin S. Carr (Democratic) 39.7%
Illinois 17	Homer W. Hall	Republican	1926	Incumbent lost re-election. Democratic gain.	▌ ✓ Frank Gillespie (Democratic) 53.5%; ▌Homer W. Hall (Republican) 46.5%
Illinois 18	William P. Holaday	Republican	1922	Incumbent lost re-election. Democratic gain.	▌ ✓ James A. Meeks (Democratic) 56.6%; ▌William P. Holaday (Republican) 43.4%
Illinois 19	Charles Adkins	Republican	1924	Incumbent lost re-election. Democratic gain.	▌ ✓ Donald C. Dobbins (Democratic) 57.7%; ▌Charles Adkins (Republican) 42.3%
Illinois 20	Henry T. Rainey	Democratic	1922	Incumbent re-elected.	▌ ✓ Henry T. Rainey (Democratic) 63.8%; ▌William J. Thornton (Republican) 36.2%
Illinois 21	J. Earl Major	Democratic	1930	Incumbent re-elected.	▌ ✓ J. Earl Major (Democratic) 59.8%; ▌Roy M. Seeley (Republican) 40.1%; ▌C. W. Morris (Independent) 0.05%; ▌A. Steed (Independent) 0.03%
Illinois 22	Charles A. Karch	Democratic	1930	Incumbent died in office. Democratic hold.	▌ ✓ Edwin M. Schaefer (Democratic) 63.8%; ▌Stewart Campbell (Republican) 36.2%
Illinois 23	William W. Arnold	Democratic	1922	Incumbent re-elected.	▌ ✓ William W. Arnold (Democratic) 64.3%; ▌T. Edward Austin (Republican) 35.7%
Illinois 24	Claude V. Parsons	Democratic	1930	Incumbent re-elected.	▌ ✓ Claude V. Parsons (Democratic) 58.8%; ▌Arthur A. Miles (Republican) 41.2%
Illinois 25	Kent E. Keller	Democratic	1930	Incumbent re-elected.	▌ ✓ Kent E. Keller (Democratic) 59.6%; ▌Edward E. Denison (Republican) 40.4%
Illinois at-large (2 seats)	William H. Dieterich	Democratic	1930	Incumbent retired to run for U.S. senator. Democratic hold.	Elected on a general ticket: ▌ ✓ Martin A. Brennan (Democratic) 26.8%; ▌ ✓ Walter Nesbit (Democratic) 26.4%; ▌Richard Yates Jr. (Republican) 22.7%; ▌Julius Klein (Republican) 22.5%; ▌Hyman Schneid (Socialist) 0.6%; ▌George Koop (Socialist) 0.6%; ▌Anthony Pszczolkowski (Communist) 0.2%; ▌Leslie Raymond Hurt (Communist) 0.2%; ▌W. F. Alexander (Socialist Labor) 0.05%; ▌Clifton Crawford (Socialist Labor) 0.04%; ▌Pasquale Iovino (Independent) 0.02%
Illinois at-large (2 seats)	Richard Yates Jr.	Republican	1918	Incumbent lost re-election. Democratic gain.	Elected on a general ticket: ▌ ✓ Martin A. Brennan (Democratic) 26.8%; ▌ ✓ Walter Nesbit (Democratic) 26.4%; ▌Richard Yates Jr. (Republican) 22.7%; ▌Julius Klein (Republican) 22.5%; ▌Hyman Schneid (Socialist) 0.6%; ▌George Koop (Socialist) 0.6%; ▌Anthony Pszczolkowski (Communist) 0.2%; ▌Leslie Raymond Hurt (Communist) 0.2%; ▌W. F. Alexander (Socialist Labor) 0.05%; ▌Clifton Crawford (Socialist Labor) 0.04%; ▌Pasquale Iovino (Independent) 0.02%

== Indiana ==
Indiana gained one seat in reapportionment. All of the incumbents were redistricted. The new seat was won by a Democrat and all the other incumbent Democrats won re-election. All three incumbent Republicans lost re-election, bringing the state from 8-3 Democratic to 12-0 Democratic.

District	Incumbent			This race	
District	Member	Party	First elected	Results	Candidates
Indiana 1	None (new district)			New seat. Democratic gain.	▌ ✓ William T. Schulte (Democratic) 51.6%; ▌Oscar A. Ahlgren (Republican) 48.4%
Indiana 2	William R. Wood; Redistricted from the 10th district	Republican	1914	Incumbent lost re-election. Democratic gain.	▌ ✓ George R. Durgan (Democratic) 54.2%; ▌William R. Wood (Republican) 45.8%
Indiana 3	Samuel B. Pettengill; Redistricted from the 13th district	Democratic	1930	Incumbent re-elected.	▌ ✓ Samuel B. Pettengill (Democratic) 56.1%; ▌Andrew J. Hickey (Republican) 43.9%
Indiana 4	David Hogg; Redistricted from the 12th district	Republican	1924	Incumbent lost re-election. Democratic gain.	▌ ✓ James I. Farley (Democratic) 56.4%; ▌David Hogg (Republican) 43.6%
Indiana 5	Glenn Griswold; Redistricted from the 11th district	Democratic	1930	Incumbent re-elected.	▌ ✓ Glenn Griswold (Democratic) 54.1%; ▌J. Raymond Schutz (Republican) 45.9%
Indiana 6	Fred S. Purnell; Redistricted from the 9th district	Republican	1916	Incumbent lost re-election. Democratic gain.	▌ ✓ Virginia E. Jenckes (Democratic) 53.8%; ▌Fred S. Purnell (Republican) 46.2%
Indiana 7	Arthur H. Greenwood; Redistricted from the 2nd district	Democratic	1922	Incumbent re-elected.	▌ ✓ Arthur H. Greenwood (Democratic) 56.7%; ▌George W. Henley (Republican) 43.3%
Indiana 8	John W. Boehne Jr. Redistricted from the 1st district	Democratic	1930	Incumbent re-elected.	▌ ✓ John W. Boehne Jr. (Democratic) 63.5%; ▌French Clements (Republican) 36.5%
Indiana 9	Eugene B. Crowe; Redistricted from the 3rd district	Democratic	1930	Incumbent re-elected.	▌ ✓ Eugene B. Crowe (Democratic) 57.7%; ▌Chester A. Davis (Republican) 42.3%
Indiana 10	Harry C. Canfield; Redistricted from the 4th district	Democratic	1922	Incumbent lost renomination. Democratic hold.	▌ ✓ Finly Gray (Democratic) 52.1%; ▌Ephraim F. Bowen (Republican) 47.9%
Indiana 11	William H. Larrabee; Redistricted from the 6th district	Democratic	1930	Incumbent re-elected.	▌ ✓ William H. Larrabee (Democratic) 54.4%; ▌Dale B. Spencer (Republican) 45.6%
Indiana 12	Louis Ludlow; Redistricted from the 7th district	Democratic	1928	Incumbent re-elected.	▌ ✓ Louis Ludlow (Democratic) 53.4%; ▌William H. Harrison (Republican) 46.6%

== Iowa ==
District	Incumbent			This race	
District	Member	Party	First elected	Results	Candidates
Iowa 1	William F. Kopp	Republican	1920	Incumbent lost re-election. Democratic gain.	▌ ✓ Edward C. Eicher (Democratic) 54.2%; ▌William F. Kopp (Republican) 45.8%
Iowa 2	Bernhard M. Jacobsen	Democratic	1930	Incumbent re-elected.	▌ ✓ Bernhard M. Jacobsen (Democratic) 58.7%; ▌Frank W. Elliott (Republican) 41.3%
Iowa 3	Thomas J. B. Robinson	Republican	1922	Incumbent lost re-election. Democratic gain.	▌ ✓ Albert C. Willford (Democratic) 50.6%; ▌Thomas J. B. Robinson (Republican) 49.4%
Iowa 4	Gilbert N. Haugen	Republican	1898	Incumbent lost re-election. Democratic gain.	▌ ✓ Fred Biermann (Democratic) 59.7%; ▌Gilbert N. Haugen (Republican) 40.3%
Iowa 5	Cyrenus Cole	Republican	1920	Incumbent retired. Republican loss.	▌ ✓ Lloyd Thurston (Republican) 50.1%; ▌Lloyd Ellis (Democratic) 49.9%
Iowa 5	Lloyd Thurston; Redistricted from the 8th district	Republican	1924	Incumbent re-elected.	▌ ✓ Lloyd Thurston (Republican) 50.1%; ▌Lloyd Ellis (Democratic) 49.9%
Iowa 5	C. William Ramseyer; Redistricted from the 6th district	Republican	1914	Incumbent lost renomination. Republican loss.	▌ ✓ Lloyd Thurston (Republican) 50.1%; ▌Lloyd Ellis (Democratic) 49.9%
Iowa 6	Cassius C. Dowell; Redistricted from the 7th district	Republican	1914	Incumbent re-elected.	▌ ✓ Cassius C. Dowell (Republican) 56.5%; ▌Charles S. Cooter (Democratic) 43.5%
Iowa 7	Charles Edward Swanson; Redistricted from the 9th district	Republican	1928	Incumbent lost re-election. Democratic gain.	▌ ✓ Otha Wearin (Democratic) 56.3%; ▌Charles Edward Swanson (Republican) 43.7%
Iowa 8	Fred C. Gilchrist; Redistricted from the 10th district	Republican	1930	Incumbent re-elected.	▌ ✓ Fred C. Gilchrist (Republican) 53.4%; ▌William T. Branagan (Democratic) 46.6%
Iowa 9	Ed H. Campbell; Redistricted from the 11th district	Republican	1928	Incumbent lost re-election. Democratic gain.	▌ ✓ Guy Gillette (Democratic) 54.9%; ▌Ed H. Campbell (Republican) 45.1%

== Kansas ==
The eighth district was eliminated when the state was reapportioned from eight to seven districts. Two incumbent Republicans lost re-election. One incumbent Republican lost renomination and the seat was won by the incumbent Republican from the district that was merged into his.

District	Incumbent			This race	
District	Member	Party	First elected	Results	Candidates
Kansas 1	William P. Lambertson	Republican	1928	Incumbent re-elected.	▌ ✓ William P. Lambertson (Republican) 57.8%; ▌M. R. Howard (Democratic) 33.4%; ▌George C. Hall (Independent) 8.8%
Kansas 1	James G. Strong; Redistricted from the 5th district	Republican	1918	Incumbent lost renomination. Republican loss.	▌ ✓ William P. Lambertson (Republican) 57.8%; ▌M. R. Howard (Democratic) 33.4%; ▌George C. Hall (Independent) 8.8%
Kansas 2	Ulysses Samuel Guyer	Republican	1926	Incumbent re-elected.	▌ ✓ Ulysses Samuel Guyer (Republican) 51.7%; ▌B. J. Sheridan (Democratic) 48.3%
Kansas 3	Harold C. McGugin	Republican	1930	Incumbent re-elected.	▌ ✓ Harold C. McGugin (Republican) 52.9%; ▌E. W. Patterson (Democratic) 44.9%; ▌Van Zant Rowe (Socialist) 2.2%
Kansas 4	Homer Hoch	Republican	1918	Incumbent lost re-election. Democratic gain.	▌ ✓ Randolph Carpenter (Democratic) 50.2%; ▌Homer Hoch (Republican) 49.5%; ▌F. M. Shonkwiler (Independent) 0.3%
Kansas 5	William Augustus Ayres; Redistricted from the 8th district	Democratic	1922	Incumbent re-elected.	▌ ✓ William Augustus Ayres (Democratic) 73.9%; ▌W. L. Farquharson (Republican) 26.1%
Kansas 6	Charles I. Sparks	Republican	1928	Incumbent lost re-election. Democratic gain.	▌ ✓ Kathryn O'Loughlin McCarthy (Democratic) 55.6%; ▌Charles I. Sparks (Republican) 44.4%
Kansas 7	Clifford R. Hope	Republican	1926	Incumbent re-elected.	▌ ✓ Clifford R. Hope (Republican) 55.6%; ▌Aaron Coleman (Democratic) 44.4%

== Kentucky ==
Kentucky, reapportioned from 11 districts down to 9, elected all of its representatives on a statewide at-large ticket. Of the nine incumbent Democratic representatives, seven were re-elected on the general ticket and two retired, while both incumbent Republicans retired.

District	Incumbent			This race	
District	Member	Party	First elected	Results	Candidates
Kentucky at-large (9 seats)	W. Voris Gregory; Redistricted from the 1st district	Democratic	1926	Incumbent re-elected.	Elected on a general ticket: ▌ ✓ Fred M. Vinson (Democratic) 6.6%; ▌ ✓ John Y. Brown Sr. (Democratic) 6.6%; ▌ ✓ Andrew J. May (Democratic) 6.6%; ▌ ✓ Brent Spence (Democratic) 6.6%; ▌ ✓ Virgil Chapman (Democratic) 6.6%; ▌ ✓ Glover H. Cary (Democratic) 6.6%; ▌ ✓ W. Voris Gregory (Democratic) 6.6%; ▌ ✓ Cap R. Carden (Democratic) 6.6%; ▌ ✓ Finley Hamilton (Democratic) 6.6%; ▌Hillard H. Smith (Republican) 4.5%; ▌Robert Blackburn (Republican) 4.5%; ▌William Lewis (Republican) 4.5%; ▌George P. Ellison (Republican) 4.5%; ▌D. E. McClure (Republican) 4.5%; ▌J. C. Speight (Republican) 4.5%; ▌Hugh H. Asher (Republican) 4.5%; ▌B. T. Rountree (Republican) 4.5%; ▌Frank B. Russell (Republican) 4.5%; ▌J. T. Scopes (Socialist) 0.04%; ▌J. J. Thobe (Socialist) 0.04%; ▌C. E. Trimble (Socialist) 0.04%; ▌W. G. Haag (Socialist) 0.04%; ▌E. C. Schulz (Socialist) 0.04%; ▌E. L. Nance (Socialist) 0.04%; ▌J. M. Woodward (Socialist) 0.04%; ▌H. L. Harwood (Socialist) 0.04%; ▌D. S. Bennett (Socialist) 0.04%; ▌Frank Reynolds (Communist) 0.003%; ▌George N. Conway (Communist) 0.003%
Kentucky at-large (9 seats)	Glover H. Cary; Redistricted from the 2nd district	Democratic	1930	Incumbent re-elected.	
Kentucky at-large (9 seats)	John Moore; Redistricted from the 3rd district	Democratic	1929	Incumbent retired. Democratic hold.	
Kentucky at-large (9 seats)	Cap R. Carden; Redistricted from the 4th district	Democratic	1930	Incumbent re-elected.	
Kentucky at-large (9 seats)	Brent Spence; Redistricted from the 6th district	Democratic	1930	Incumbent re-elected.	
Kentucky at-large (9 seats)	Virgil Chapman; Redistricted from the 7th district	Democratic	1930	Incumbent re-elected.	
Kentucky at-large (9 seats)	Ralph Gilbert; Redistricted from the 8th district	Democratic	1930	Incumbent retired. Democratic hold.	
Kentucky at-large (9 seats)	Fred M. Vinson; Redistricted from the 9th district	Democratic	1930	Incumbent re-elected.	
Kentucky at-large (9 seats)	Andrew J. May; Redistricted from the 10th district	Democratic	1930	Incumbent re-elected.	
Kentucky at-large (9 seats)	Maurice H. Thatcher; Redistricted from the 5th district	Republican	1922	Incumbent retired. Republican loss.	
Kentucky at-large (9 seats)	Charles Finley; Redistricted from the 11th district	Republican	1930	Incumbent retired. Republican loss.	

== Louisiana ==
Louisiana continued to elect its representatives based upon districts adopted in 1912. Those districts did not change until the 1968 elections.

District	Incumbent			This race	
District	Member	Party	First elected	Results	Candidates
Louisiana 1	Joachim O. Fernández	Democratic	1930	Incumbent re-elected.	▌ ✓ Joachim O. Fernández (Democratic); Uncontested
Louisiana 2	Paul H. Maloney	Democratic	1930	Incumbent re-elected.	▌ ✓ Paul H. Maloney (Democratic); Uncontested
Louisiana 3	Numa F. Montet	Democratic	1929	Incumbent re-elected.	▌ ✓ Numa F. Montet (Democratic); Uncontested
Louisiana 4	John N. Sandlin	Democratic	1920	Incumbent re-elected.	▌ ✓ John N. Sandlin (Democratic); Uncontested
Louisiana 5	Riley J. Wilson	Democratic	1914	Incumbent re-elected.	▌ ✓ Riley J. Wilson (Democratic); Uncontested
Louisiana 6	Bolivar E. Kemp	Democratic	1924	Incumbent re-elected.	▌ ✓ Bolivar E. Kemp (Democratic); Uncontested
Louisiana 7	René L. De Rouen	Democratic	1927	Incumbent re-elected.	▌ ✓ René L. De Rouen (Democratic); Uncontested
Louisiana 8	John H. Overton	Democratic	1931	Retired to run for U.S. senator. Democratic hold.	▌ ✓ Cleveland Dear (Democratic); Uncontested

== Maine ==
Maine was redistricted from four seats down to three; of four Republican incumbents, only one was re-elected; one retired and two were defeated by Democratic challengers.

District	Incumbent			This race	
District	Member	Party	First elected	Results	Candidates
Maine 1	Carroll L. Beedy	Republican	1920	Incumbent re-elected.	▌ ✓ Carroll L. Beedy (Republican) 51.1%; ▌Joseph E. F. Connolly (Democratic) 48.9%
Maine 2	Donald B. Partridge	Republican	1930	Incumbent retired. Republican loss.	▌ ✓ Edward C. Moran (Democratic) 51.8%; ▌John E. Nelson (Republican) 47.4%; ▌Frederick P. Bonney (Ind. Republican) 0.8%
Maine 2	John E. Nelson; Redistricted from the 3rd district	Republican	1922	Incumbent lost re-election. Democratic gain.	▌ ✓ Edward C. Moran (Democratic) 51.8%; ▌John E. Nelson (Republican) 47.4%; ▌Frederick P. Bonney (Ind. Republican) 0.8%
Maine 3	Donald F. Snow; Redistricted from the 4th district	Republican	1928	Incumbent lost renomination. Democratic gain.	▌ ✓ John G. Utterback (Democratic) 50.1%; ▌Owen Brewster (Republican) 49.6%; ▌Carl S. Godfrey (Socialist) 0.3%

== Maryland ==
District	Incumbent			This race	
District	Member	Party	First elected	Results	Candidates
Maryland 1	T. Alan Goldsborough	Democratic	1920	Incumbent re-elected.	▌ ✓ T. Alan Goldsborough (Democratic) 64.9%; ▌Harry T. Phoebus (Republican) 35.1%
Maryland 2	William P. Cole Jr.	Democratic	1930	Incumbent re-elected.	▌ ✓ William P. Cole Jr. (Democratic) 67.3%; ▌David L. Elliott (Republican) 32.7%
Maryland 3	Vincent Luke Palmisano	Democratic	1926	Incumbent re-elected.	▌ ✓ Vincent Luke Palmisano (Democratic) 72.8%; ▌R. Palmer Ingram (Republican) 23.8%; ▌Samuel M. Neistadt (Socialist) 2.9%; ▌Walter Potruzuski (Communist) 0.5%
Maryland 4	J. Charles Linthicum	Democratic	1910	Incumbent died October 5, 1932. Democratic hold. Winner also elected the same day to finish the current term.	▌ ✓ Ambrose Jerome Kennedy (Democratic) 66.0%; ▌Claude B. Sweezey (Republican) 31.6%; ▌James J. Kane (Socialist) 2.1%; ▌John Gattes (Communist) 0.3%
Maryland 5	Stephen W. Gambrill	Democratic	1924	Incumbent re-elected.	▌ ✓ Stephen W. Gambrill (Democratic) 70.4%; ▌A. Kingsley Love (Republican) 29.6%
Maryland 6	David J. Lewis	Democratic	1930	Incumbent re-elected.	▌ ✓ David J. Lewis (Democratic) 58.4%; ▌Harold C. Smith (Republican) 41.6%

== Massachusetts ==
Massachusetts was redistricted from 16 districts to 15; 10 Republican and 4 Democratic incumbents were re-elected, while 2 Republican incumbents retired in the old 8th and 9th districts; the new 8th containing parts of both elected a Democrat.

District	Incumbent			This race	
District	Member	Party	First elected	Results	Candidates
Massachusetts 1	Allen T. Treadway	Republican	1912	Incumbent re-elected.	▌ ✓ Allen T. Treadway (Republican) 54.7%; ▌Thomas F. Cassidy (Democratic) 42.6%; ▌Paul C. Wicks (Socialist) 2.8%
Massachusetts 2	William J. Granfield	Democratic	1930	Incumbent re-elected.	▌ ✓ William J. Granfield (Democratic) 49.9%; ▌Joshua L. Brooks (Republican) 45.7%; ▌F. Ralph Harlow (Socialist) 4.3%
Massachusetts 3	Frank H. Foss	Republican	1924	Incumbent re-elected.	▌ ✓ Frank H. Foss (Republican) 51.5%; ▌M. Fred O'Connell (Democratic) 48.5%
Massachusetts 4	Pehr G. Holmes	Republican	1930	Incumbent re-elected.	▌ ✓ Pehr G. Holmes (Republican) 55.0%; ▌John J. Walsh (Democratic) 45.0%
Massachusetts 5	Edith Nourse Rogers	Republican	1925	Incumbent re-elected.	▌ ✓ Edith Nourse Rogers (Republican) 59.9%; ▌James J. Bruin (Democratic) 40.1%
Massachusetts 6	A. Piatt Andrew	Republican	1921	Incumbent re-elected.	▌ ✓ A. Piatt Andrew (Republican) 67.7%; ▌James D. Burns (Democratic) 32.3%
Massachusetts 7	William P. Connery Jr.	Democratic	1922	Incumbent re-elected.	▌ ✓ William P. Connery Jr. (Democratic) 56.6%; ▌Charles W. Lovett (Republican) 40.7%; ▌Joseph F. Massidda (Socialist) 2.7%
Massachusetts 8	Frederick W. Dallinger	Republican	1926	Incumbent resigned October 1, 1932. Democratic gain.	▌ ✓ Arthur D. Healey (Democratic) 51.1%; ▌George H. Norton (Republican) 48.9%
Massachusetts 9	Robert Luce; Redistricted from the 13th district	Republican	1918	Incumbent re-elected.	▌ ✓ Robert Luce (Republican) 51.4%; ▌Frederick S. Deitrick (Democratic) 47.4%; ▌William Barnard Smith (Prohibition) 1.2%
Massachusetts 10	George H. Tinkham; Redistricted from the 11th district	Republican	1914	Incumbent re-elected.	▌ ✓ George H. Tinkham (Republican) 60.3%; ▌John J. Crehan (Democratic) 39.7%
Massachusetts 11	John J. Douglass; Redistricted from the 10th district	Democratic	1924	Incumbent re-elected.	▌ ✓ John J. Douglass (Democratic) 85.7%; ▌William F. McDonald (Republican) 14.3%
Massachusetts 12	John W. McCormack	Democratic	1928	Incumbent re-elected.	▌ ✓ John W. McCormack (Democratic) 72.9%; ▌Bernard Ginsburg (Republican) 27.1%
Massachusetts 13	Richard B. Wigglesworth	Republican	1928	Incumbent re-elected.	▌ ✓ Richard B. Wigglesworth (Republican) 58.4%; ▌Edward G. Morris (Democratic) 41.6%
Massachusetts 14	Joseph W. Martin Jr.	Republican	1924	Incumbent re-elected.	▌ ✓ Joseph W. Martin Jr. (Republican) 56.8%; ▌Andrew J. McGraw (Democratic) 43.2%
Massachusetts 15	Charles L. Gifford	Republican	1922	Incumbent re-elected.	▌ ✓ Charles L. Gifford (Republican) 57.5%; ▌Thomas H. Buckley (Democratic) 39.6%; ▌Jacob Minkin (Socialist) 2.9%

== Michigan ==
Michigan was redistricted from 13 to 17 districts, adding four new districts in and around Detroit.

District	Incumbent			This race	
District	Member	Party	First elected	Results	Candidates
Michigan 1	None (new district)			New seat. Democratic gain.	▌ ✓ George G. Sadowski (Democratic) 68.1%; ▌Charles H. Mahoney (Republican) 28.7%; ▌Joseph Billups (Communist) 1.6%; ▌Alex Levitt (Socialist) 1.3%; ▌Walter Ty Krentler (American) 0.3%
Michigan 2	Earl C. Michener	Republican	1918	Incumbent lost re-election. Democratic gain.	▌ ✓ John C. Lehr (Democratic) 50.6%; ▌Earl C. Michener (Republican) 48.3%; ▌Harold P. Marley (Socialist) 1.0%; ▌Ira Welsh (Communist) 0.2%
Michigan 3	Joseph L. Hooper	Republican	1925	Incumbent re-elected.	▌ ✓ Joseph L. Hooper (Republican) 50.2%; ▌Charles E. Gauss (Democratic) 46.9%; ▌J. Robert Childs (Socialist) 1.4%; ▌Charles Francis Young (Prohibition) 1.3%; ▌E. M. Curry (Communist) 0.2%
Michigan 4	John C. Ketcham	Republican	1920	Incumbent lost re-election. Democratic gain.	▌ ✓ George Foulkes (Democratic) 51.6%; ▌John C. Ketcham (Republican) 47.2%; ▌Hale Tennant (Socialist) 1.2%; ▌Howard Harris (Communist) 0.07%
Michigan 5	Carl E. Mapes	Republican	1912	Incumbent re-elected.	▌ ✓ Carl E. Mapes (Republican) 51.3%; ▌Winfield H. Caslow (Democratic) 47.3%; ▌Morris Armour (Socialist) 1.2%; ▌Arthur Briggs (Communist) 0.3%
Michigan 6	Seymour H. Person	Republican	1930	Incumbent lost re-election. Democratic gain.	▌ ✓ Claude E. Cady (Democratic) 47.8%; ▌Seymour H. Person (Republican) 39.5%; ▌Grant M. Hudson (Republican) 12.5%; ▌Spurgeon D. Gostelow (Prohibition) 0.1%; ▌William Carley (Communist) 0.1%
Michigan 7	Jesse P. Wolcott	Republican	1930	Incumbent re-elected.	▌ ✓ Jesse P. Wolcott (Republican) 56.1%; ▌James G. Tucker (Democratic) 41.8%; ▌Emerald B. Dixon (Prohibition) 2.0%; ▌Edward L. Mills (Communist) 0.2%
Michigan 8	Michael J. Hart	Democratic	1931	Incumbent re-elected.	▌ ✓ Michael J. Hart (Democratic) 53.5%; ▌William M. Smith (Republican) 44.9%; ▌Charles W. Crum (Socialist) 1.3%; ▌Howard L. Holmes (Prohibition) 0.3%; ▌John G. Zittel (Communist) 0.06%
Michigan 9	James C. McLaughlin	Republican	1906	Incumbent lost re-election. Democratic gain.	▌ ✓ Harry W. Musselwhite (Democratic) 52.2%; ▌James C. McLaughlin (Republican) 47.3%; ▌Clyde Smith (Communist) 0.5%
Michigan 10	Roy O. Woodruff	Republican	1920	Incumbent re-elected.	▌ ✓ Roy O. Woodruff (Republican) 54.0%; ▌William J. Kelly (Democratic) 44.9%; ▌William Rabideau (Socialist) 1.0%
Michigan 11	Frank P. Bohn	Republican	1926	Incumbent lost re-election. Democratic gain.	▌ ✓ Prentiss M. Brown (Democratic) 50.0%; ▌Frank P. Bohn (Republican) 47.6%; ▌Eugene Le Roy (Socialist) 2.0%; ▌Alfred Bachman (Communist) 0.4%
Michigan 12	W. Frank James	Republican	1914	Incumbent re-elected.	▌ ✓ W. Frank James (Republican) 62.5%; ▌Levi S. Rice (Democratic) 35.0%; ▌Arne Roine (Communist) 2.5%
Michigan 13	Clarence J. McLeod	Republican	1922	Incumbent re-elected.	▌ ✓ Clarence J. McLeod (Republican) 52.4%; ▌Clarence E. Seebaldt (Democratic) 45.1%; ▌Alois Simon (Socialist) 1.8%; ▌Frank Sullivan (Communist) 0.8%
Michigan 14	Robert H. Clancy; Redistricted from the 1st district	Republican	1926	Incumbent lost re-election. Democratic gain.	▌ ✓ Carl M. Weideman (Democratic) 50.4%; ▌Robert H. Clancy (Republican) 47.3%; ▌Arthur E. Kent (Socialist) 1.8%; ▌John Schmies (Communist) 0.6%
Michigan 15	None (new district)			New seat. Democratic gain.	▌ ✓ John Dingell Sr. (Democratic) 48.3%; ▌Charles Bowles (Republican) 46.0%; ▌Robert D. Wardell (American) 3.4%; ▌Morton Allen (Socialist) 1.6%; ▌Bronislaw Wronski (Communist) 0.6%
Michigan 16	None (new district)			New seat. Democratic gain.	▌ ✓ John Lesinski Sr. (Democratic) 53.0%; ▌Frank P. Darin (Republican) 44.2%; ▌Mint Nauta (Socialist) 1.5%; ▌John T. Pace (Communist) 1.2%
Michigan 17	None (new district)			New seat. Republican gain.	▌ ✓ George A. Dondero (Republican) 52.6%; ▌Harry Mitchell (Democratic) 44.9%; ▌W. H. Allmendiger (Socialist) 2.1%; ▌Margaret Jenkins (Communist) 0.4%

== Minnesota ==
Minnesota, reapportioned from 10 seats down to 9, elected all representatives at large. Of the 10 incumbents, only 1 Farmer–Labor and 1 Republican were re-elected. The other Republicans either lost re-election (4), lost renomination (3), or retired (1). The delegation changed therefore from overwhelmingly Republican (9–1) to a majority Farmer-Labor (5–4).

District	Incumbent			This race	
District	Member	Party	First elected	Results	Candidates
Minnesota at-large (9 seats)	Victor Christgau; Redistricted from the 1st district	Republican	1928	Incumbent lost renomination. Republican hold.	Elected at large: ▌ ✓ Magnus Johnson (Farmer–Labor) 5.0%; ▌ ✓ Paul J. Kvale (Farmer–Labor) 4.9%; ▌ ✓ Henry M. Arens (Farmer–Labor) 4.6%; ▌ ✓ Ernest Lundeen (Farmer–Labor) 4.5%; ▌ ✓ Theodore Christianson (Republican) 4.3%; ▌ ✓ Einar Hoidale (Democratic) 4.1%; ▌ ✓ Ray P. Chase (Republican) 4.1%; ▌ ✓ Francis Shoemaker (Farmer–Labor) 4.1%; ▌ ✓ Harold Knutson (Republican) 4.0%; ▌August H. Andresen (Republican) 4.0%; ▌William I. Nolan (Republican) 3.9%; ▌Conrad Selvig (Republican) 3.9%; ▌Joseph A. A. Burnquist (Republican) 3.9%; ▌Jacob L. Peterson (Farmer–Labor) 3.8%; ▌Henry Teigan (Farmer–Labor) 3.8%; ▌Christian F. Gaarenstroom (Farmer–Labor) 3.7%; ▌William A. Pittenger (Republican) 3.7%; ▌Nathaniel John Holmberg (Republican) 3.7%; ▌Arthur C. Townley (Farmer–Labor) 3.4%; ▌Robert Cook Bell (Democratic) 3.1%; ▌John P. Coughlin (Democratic) 2.8%; ▌Silas M. Bryan (Democratic) 2.7%; ▌Emil E. Holmes (Democratic) 2.6%; ▌James R. Bennett Jr. (Democratic) 2.5%; ▌Donald A. Chapman (Democratic) 2.4%; ▌Hugh T. Kennedy (Democratic) 2.4%; ▌John Bowe (Democratic) 2.4%; ▌Victor Christgau (Independent) 1.1%; ▌J. W. Anderson (Communist) 0.2%; ▌M. Karson (Communist) 0.1%; ▌Fred Lequier (Communist) 0.1%; ▌Melvin J. Maas (Independent) 0.01%
Minnesota at-large (9 seats)	August H. Andresen; Redistricted from the 3rd district	Republican	1924	Incumbent lost re-election. Farmer–Labor gain.	
Minnesota at-large (9 seats)	Melvin Maas; Redistricted from the 4th district	Republican	1926	Incumbent lost renomination. Democratic gain.	
Minnesota at-large (9 seats)	William I. Nolan; Redistricted from the 5th district	Republican	1929 (special)	Incumbent lost re-election. Farmer–Labor gain.	
Minnesota at-large (9 seats)	Harold Knutson; Redistricted from the 6th district	Republican	1916	Incumbent re-elected.	
Minnesota at-large (9 seats)	Paul J. Kvale; Redistricted from the 7th district	Farmer–Labor	1929 (special)	Incumbent re-elected.	
Minnesota at-large (9 seats)	William A. Pittenger; Redistricted from the 8th district	Republican	1928	Incumbent lost re-election. Farmer–Labor gain.	
Minnesota at-large (9 seats)	Conrad Selvig; Redistricted from the 9th district	Republican	1926	Incumbent lost re-election. Farmer–Labor gain.	
Minnesota at-large (9 seats)	Godfrey G. Goodwin; Redistricted from the 10th district	Republican	1924	Incumbent lost renomination. Republican hold.	
Minnesota at-large (9 seats)	Frank Clague; Redistricted from the 2nd district	Republican	1920	Incumbent retired. Republican loss.	

== Mississippi ==
Redistricted from 8 districts to 7, with most of the 8th district being added to the 7th.

District	Incumbent			This race	
District	Member	Party	First elected	Results	Candidates
Mississippi 1	John E. Rankin	Democratic	1920	Incumbent re-elected.	▌ ✓ John E. Rankin (Democratic) 97.0%; ▌T. C. Moore (Republican) 1.5%; ▌John R. Duberry (Republican) 1.5%
Mississippi 2	Wall Doxey	Democratic	1928	Incumbent re-elected.	▌ ✓ Wall Doxey (Democratic) 98.5%; ▌L. E. Oldham (Republican) 0.9%; ▌William McDonough (Republican) 0.6%
Mississippi 3	William Madison Whittington	Democratic	1924	Incumbent re-elected.	▌ ✓ William Madison Whittington (Democratic) 95.7%; ▌J. T. Spence (Republican) 2.5%; ▌Rice Hungerford Jr. (Republican) 1.7%
Mississippi 4	T. Jeff Busby	Democratic	1922	Incumbent re-elected.	▌ ✓ T. Jeff Busby (Democratic) 97.8%; ▌D. F. Elliott (Republican) 1.2%; ▌J. O. Martin (Republican) 0.9%
Mississippi 5	Ross A. Collins	Democratic	1920	Incumbent re-elected.	▌ ✓ Ross A. Collins (Democratic) 97.0%; ▌F. M. Robertson (Republican) 1.6%; ▌Anna W. Matthews (Republican) 1.3%
Mississippi 6	Robert S. Hall	Democratic	1928	Lost renomination. Democratic hold.	▌ ✓ William M. Colmer (Democratic) 94.5%; ▌John R. Tally (Republican) 4.4%; ▌Charles M. Hays (Republican) 1.1%
Mississippi 7	Lawrence R. Ellzey	Democratic	1932	Incumbent re-elected.	▌ ✓ Lawrence R. Ellzey (Democratic) 95.6%; ▌George W. Forbes (Republican) 2.6%; ▌Loyal G. Reese (Republican) 1.4%

== Missouri ==
Missouri was reapportioned from 16 seats to 13, which were elected on a general ticket. The delegation went from 12 Democrats and 4 Republicans to 13 Democrats, 8 of them previous incumbents.

District	Incumbent			This race	
District	Member	Party	First elected	Results	Candidates
Missouri at-large (13 seats)	Milton A. Romjue; Redistricted from the 1st district	Democratic	1922	Incumbent re-elected.	Elected on a general ticket: ▌ ✓ John J. Cochran (Democratic) 4.9%; ▌ ✓ James R. Claiborne (Democratic) 4.8%; ▌ ✓ Joe Shannon (Democratic) 4.8%; ▌ ✓ Clyde Williams (Democratic) 4.8%; ▌ ✓ Clarence Cannon (Democratic) 4.8%; ▌ ✓ Frank H. Lee (Democratic) 4.8%; ▌ ✓ James E. Ruffin (Democratic) 4.8%; ▌ ✓ Ralph F. Lozier (Democratic) 4.8%; ▌ ✓ Jacob L. Milligan (Democratic) 4.8%; ▌ ✓ Reuben T. Wood (Democratic) 4.8%; ▌ ✓ Milton A. Romjue (Democratic) 4.8%; ▌ ✓ Richard M. Duncan (Democratic) 4.8%; ▌ ✓ Clement C. Dickinson (Democratic) 4.7%; ▌Leonidas C. Dyer (Republican) 2.9%; ▌Henry F. Niedringhaus (Republican) 2.9%; ▌James Stewart (Republican) 2.8%; ▌Philip A. Bennett (Republican) 2.8%; ▌John M. Hadley (Republican) 2.8%; ▌Carl Otto (Republican) 2.8%; ▌Louis E. Miller (Republican) 2.8%; ▌Sam A. Clark (Republican) 2.8%; ▌Joe J. Manlove (Republican) 2.8%; ▌Rowland L. Johnston (Republican) 2.8%; ▌David W. Hopkins (Republican) 2.8%; ▌John W. Palmer (Republican) 2.8%; ▌Manvel H. Davis (Republican) 2.8%; ▌Phillips (Socialist) 0.06%; ▌Morrison (Socialist) 0.06%; ▌Langley (Socialist) 0.06%; ▌Becker (Socialist) 0.06%; ▌Elliff (Socialist) 0.06%; ▌Anderson (Socialist) 0.06%; ▌Henschel (Socialist) 0.06%; ▌Davidson (Socialist) 0.06%; ▌Turner (Socialist) 0.06%; ▌Hill (Socialist) 0.06%; ▌Harrison (Socialist) 0.05%; ▌Shumaker (Socialist) 0.05%; ▌Thayer (Socialist) 0.05%; ▌Benz (Communist) 0.003%
Missouri at-large (13 seats)	Ralph F. Lozier; Redistricted from the 2nd district	Democratic	1922	Incumbent re-elected.	
Missouri at-large (13 seats)	Jacob L. Milligan; Redistricted from the 3rd district	Democratic	1922	Incumbent re-elected.	
Missouri at-large (13 seats)	David W. Hopkins; Redistricted from the 4th district	Republican	1929	Incumbent lost re-election. Democratic gain.	
Missouri at-large (13 seats)	Joe Shannon; Redistricted from the 5th district	Democratic	1930	Incumbent re-elected.	
Missouri at-large (13 seats)	Clement C. Dickinson; Redistricted from the 6th district	Democratic	1930	Incumbent re-elected.	
Missouri at-large (13 seats)	Robert D. Johnson; Redistricted from the 7th district	Democratic	1931	Incumbent lost renomination. Democratic hold.	
Missouri at-large (13 seats)	William L. Nelson; Redistricted from the 8th district	Democratic	1924	Incumbent lost renomination. Democratic hold.	
Missouri at-large (13 seats)	Clarence Cannon; Redistricted from the 9th district	Democratic	1922	Incumbent re-elected.	
Missouri at-large (13 seats)	John J. Cochran; Redistricted from the 11th district	Democratic	1926	Incumbent re-elected.	
Missouri at-large (13 seats)	Clyde Williams; Redistricted from the 13th district	Democratic	1930	Incumbent re-elected.	
Missouri at-large (13 seats)	James F. Fulbright; Redistricted from the 14th district	Democratic	1930	Incumbent lost renomination. Democratic hold.	
Missouri at-large (13 seats)	William E. Barton; Redistricted from the 16th district	Democratic	1930	Incumbent lost renomination. Democratic hold.	
Missouri at-large (13 seats)	Henry F. Niedringhaus; Redistricted from the 10th district	Republican	1926	Incumbent lost re-election. Republican loss.	
Missouri at-large (13 seats)	Leonidas C. Dyer; Redistricted from the 12th district	Republican	1914	Incumbent lost re-election. Republican loss.	
Missouri at-large (13 seats)	Joe J. Manlove; Redistricted from the 15th district	Republican	1922	Incumbent retired. Republican loss.	

== Montana ==
District	Incumbent			This race	
District	Member	Party	First elected	Results	Candidates
Montana 1	John M. Evans	Democratic	1922	Incumbent lost renomination. Democratic hold.	▌ ✓ Joseph P. Monaghan (Democratic) 59.0%; ▌Mark D. Fitzgerald (Republican) 38.4%; ▌A. N. Brooks (Socialist) 2.2%; ▌Roger Murray (Communist) 0.3%
Montana 2	Scott Leavitt	Republican	1922	Incumbent lost re-election. Democratic gain.	▌ ✓ Roy E. Ayers (Democratic) 52.5%; ▌Scott Leavitt (Republican) 44.1%; ▌J. H. Matheson (Democratic) 1.3%; ▌Harry Juul (Communist) 1.2%; ▌H. F. Fuerstnow (Liberty) 0.9%

== Nebraska ==
District	Incumbent			This race	
District	Member	Party	First elected	Results	Candidates
Nebraska 1	John H. Morehead	Democratic	1922	Incumbent re-elected.	▌ ✓ John H. Morehead (Democratic) 58.0%; ▌Marcus L. Poteet (Republican) 40.2%; ▌Daniel Hill (Socialist) 1.8%
Nebraska 2	Howard M. Baldrige	Republican	1930	Incumbent lost re-election. Democratic gain.	▌ ✓ Edward R. Burke (Democratic) 51.3%; ▌Howard M. Baldrige (Republican) 43.8%; ▌Grenville P. North (Independent) 1.7%; ▌Hugh W. Thomas (Independent) 1.3%; ▌Arthur F. Stearns (Socialist) 1.1%; ▌Claude L. Nethaway (Independent) 0.4%; ▌Henry Hoffman (Independent) 0.4%
Nebraska 3	Edgar Howard	Democratic	1922	Incumbent re-elected.	▌ ✓ Edgar Howard (Democratic) 66.0%; ▌H. Halderson (Republican) 29.3%; ▌M. F. Hall (Independent) 3.4%; ▌Aug. Hohneke (Socialist) 1.3%
Nebraska 4	John N. Norton	Democratic	1930	Incumbent lost renomination. Democratic loss.	▌ ✓ Ashton C. Shallenberger (Democratic) 44.8%; ▌Fred G. Johnson (Republican) 32.5%; ▌Charles G. Binderup (Independent) 17.6%; ▌Charles M. Bosley (Independent) 4.0%; ▌Peter Uerling (Socialist) 1.2%
Nebraska 4	Ashton C. Shallenberger; Redistricted from the 5th district	Democratic	1930	Incumbent re-elected.	▌ ✓ Ashton C. Shallenberger (Democratic) 44.8%; ▌Fred G. Johnson (Republican) 32.5%; ▌Charles G. Binderup (Independent) 17.6%; ▌Charles M. Bosley (Independent) 4.0%; ▌Peter Uerling (Socialist) 1.2%
Nebraska 5	Robert G. Simmons; Redistricted from the 6th district	Republican	1922	Incumbent lost re-election. Democratic gain.	▌ ✓ Terry Carpenter (Democratic) 51.3%; ▌Robert G. Simmons (Republican) 47.1%; ▌A. E. Bell (Socialist) 1.5%

== Nevada ==
District	Incumbent			This race	
District	Member	Party	First elected	Results	Candidates
Nevada at-large	Samuel S. Arentz	Republican	1924	Incumbent lost re-election. Democratic gain.	▌ ✓ James G. Scrugham (Democratic) 60.8%; ▌Samuel S. Arentz (Republican) 39.2%

== New Hampshire ==
District	Incumbent			This race	
District	Member	Party	First elected	Results	Candidates
New Hampshire 1	William Nathaniel Rogers	Democratic	1932	Incumbent re-elected.	▌ ✓ William Nathaniel Rogers (Democratic) 51.3%; ▌William P. Straw (Republican) 48.6%; ▌John Zebrowski (Independent) 0.1%
New Hampshire 2	Edward Hills Wason	Republican	1914	Incumbent retired. Republican hold.	▌ ✓ Charles W. Tobey (Republican) 52.8%; ▌Jeremiah J. Doyle (Democratic) 46.8%; ▌Eli Bourbon (Socialist) 0.3%; ▌Waino H. Wirkkala (Communist) 0.1%

== New Jersey ==
District	Incumbent			This race	
District	Member	Party	First elected	Results	Candidates
New Jersey 1	Charles A. Wolverton	Republican	1926	Incumbent re-elected.	▌ ✓ Charles A. Wolverton (Republican) 60.2%; ▌Samuel T. French (Democratic) 36.7%; ▌Morris Stempa (Socialist) 2.4%; ▌Charles R. Engel (Prohibition) 0.7%; ▌Leon A. Ollen (Communist) 0.06%
New Jersey 2	Isaac Bacharach	Republican	1914	Incumbent re-elected.	▌ ✓ Isaac Bacharach (Republican) 62.9%; ▌Harry R. Coulomb (Democratic) 36.4%; ▌Albert H. Schreiber (Socialist) 0.4%; ▌Walter L Yerkes (Prohibition) 0.3%
New Jersey 3	William H. Sutphin	Democratic	1930	Incumbent re-elected.	▌ ✓ William H. Sutphin (Democratic) 50.9%; ▌Stanley Washburn (Republican) 48.4%; ▌Ethel Beck (Socialist) 0.6%; ▌George R. Carroll (Communist) 0.1%
New Jersey 4	None (new district)			New district. Republican gain.	▌ ✓ D. Lane Powers (Republican) 55.0%; ▌Monell Sayre (Democratic) 43.2%; ▌William C. Kauffman (Socialist) 1.5%; ▌Joseph Wisniewski (Communist) 0.2%; ▌Russell Y. Page (Personal Choice) 0.008%
New Jersey 5	Charles A. Eaton; Redistricted from the 4th district	Republican	1924	Incumbent re-elected.	▌ ✓ Charles A. Eaton (Republican) 53.2%; ▌Frederic M. P. Pearse (Democratic) 45.6%; ▌Bordeaux W. Stokes (Socialist) 1.0%; ▌Joseph F. Fofrich (Communist) 0.2%
New Jersey 6	Percy Hamilton Stewart; Redistricted from the 5th district	Democratic	1931	Retired to run for U.S. senator. Republican gain.	▌ ✓ Donald H. McLean (Republican) 57.4%; ▌Fred C. Hyer (Democratic) 41.9%; ▌Minnie Zurov Sliptzin (Communist) 0.6%
New Jersey 7	Randolph Perkins; Redistricted from the 6th district	Republican	1920	Incumbent re-elected.	▌ ✓ Randolph Perkins (Republican) 51.6%; ▌Hamilton Cross (Democratic) 47.3%; ▌Ferdinand Kadel (Socialist) 0.9%; ▌James Benjamin McBride Jr. (Communist) 0.1%; ▌Harold Taft Wright (Independent) 0.07%; ▌Emil Landgraf (Socialist Labor) 0.05%
New Jersey 8	George N. Seger; Redistricted from the 7th district	Republican	1922	Incumbent re-elected.	▌ ✓ George N. Seger (Republican) 49.2%; ▌Harry Joelson (Democratic) 48.9%; ▌Garrett DeYoung (Socialist) 1.5%; ▌Morris M. Brown (Communist) 0.2%; ▌John Leahy (Socialist Labor) 0.09%; ▌William Richard Clark (Prohibition) 0.08%
New Jersey 9	None (new district)			New seat. Democratic gain.	▌ ✓ Edward A. Kenney (Democratic) 47.6%; ▌Joseph W. Marini (Republican) 46.8%; ▌Edward J. Ryan (Independent) 4.1%; ▌Henry J. Cox (Socialist) 1.5%
New Jersey 10	Fred A. Hartley Jr. Redistricted from the 8th district	Republican	1928	Incumbent re-elected.	▌ ✓ Fred A. Hartley Jr. (Republican) 55.2%; ▌William W. Harrison (Democratic) 43.4%; ▌Andrew P. Wittel (Socialist) 1.3%; ▌Mary Rozanski (Communist) 0.10%
New Jersey 11	Peter Angelo Cavicchia; Redistricted from the 9th district	Republican	1930	Incumbent re-elected.	▌ ✓ Peter Angelo Cavicchia (Republican) 49.8%; ▌John J. McCloskey (Democratic) 48.8%; ▌M. Hart Walker (Socialist) 1.2%; ▌John Kasper (Communist) 0.2%
New Jersey 12	Frederick R. Lehlbach; Redistricted from the 10th district	Republican	1914	Incumbent re-elected.	▌ ✓ Frederick R. Lehlbach (Republican) 56.1%; ▌Joseph M. Degnan (Democratic) 41.7%; ▌Louis Reiss (Socialist) 2.0%; ▌Charles Mitchell (Communist) 0.3%
New Jersey 13	Mary Teresa Norton; Redistricted from the 12th district	Democratic	1924	Incumbent re-elected.	▌ ✓ Mary Teresa Norton (Democratic) 72.1%; ▌Mortimer Neuman (Republican) 27.3%; ▌Archibald Craig (Socialist) 0.3%; ▌Michael G. Pipi (Liberty) 0.1%; ▌Max Botwinick (Communist) 0.1%; ▌George Ludwig (Socialist Labor) 0.03%
New Jersey 14	Oscar L. Auf der Heide; Redistricted from the 11th district	Democratic	1924	Incumbent re-elected.	▌ ✓ Oscar L. Auf der Heide (Democratic) 75.1%; ▌Vincent P. McGann (Republican) 23.7%; ▌Michael Rappaport (Socialist) 0.7%; ▌George Driscoll (Independent) 0.2%; ▌Albert Hoffman (Communist) 0.1%; ▌Charles Schrafft (Socialist Labor) 0.08%

== New Mexico ==
District	Incumbent			This race	
District	Member	Party	First elected	Results	Candidates
New Mexico at-large	Dennis Chávez	Democratic	1930	Incumbent re-elected.	▌ ✓ Dennis Chávez (Democratic) 63.4%; ▌Jose E. Armijo (Republican) 35.4%; ▌N. S. Sweeney (Socialist) 0.9%; ▌L. E. Lake (Liberty) 0.3%; ▌E. T. Howell (Communist) 0.09%

== New York ==
New York, reapportioned from 43 to 45 seats, left its districts unchanged and elected the two new members at large.

District	Incumbent			This race	
District	Member	Party	First elected	Results	Candidates
New York 1	Robert L. Bacon	Republican	1922	Incumbent re-elected.	▌ ✓ Robert L. Bacon (Republican) 54.0%; ▌Cornelius V. Whitney (Democratic) 42.9%; ▌Eric E. DeMarsh (Socialist) 1.6%; ▌William F. Varney (Law) 1.5%
New York 2	William F. Brunner	Democratic	1928	Incumbent re-elected.	▌ ✓ William F. Brunner (Democratic) 68.6%; ▌Horace A. Demarest (Republican) 27.3%; ▌James Oneal (Socialist) 4.1%
New York 3	George W. Lindsay	Democratic	1922	Incumbent re-elected.	▌ ✓ George W. Lindsay (Democratic) 80.8%; ▌Edgar H. Hazelwood (Republican) 13.9%; ▌Joseph A. Weil (Socialist) 4.2%; ▌Clarence H. Hathaway (Communist) 1.1%
New York 4	Thomas H. Cullen	Democratic	1918	Incumbent re-elected.	▌ ✓ Thomas H. Cullen (Democratic) 82.1%; ▌Conrad P. Printzlien (Republican) 15.4%; ▌Joseph C. Class (Socialist) 2.0%; ▌Carl O. Peterson (Communist) 0.5%
New York 5	Loring M. Black Jr.	Democratic	1922	Incumbent re-elected.	▌ ✓ Loring M. Black Jr. (Democratic) 64.8%; ▌Irving C. Maltz (Republican) 30.9%; ▌Jacob L. Afros (Socialist) 4.3%
New York 6	Andrew Lawrence Somers	Democratic	1924	Incumbent re-elected.	▌ ✓ Andrew Lawrence Somers (Democratic) 57.0%; ▌Joseph P. Byrne (Republican) 29.7%; ▌Harry W. Laidler (Socialist) 11.0%; ▌Wolf Schefter (Communist) 1.4%; ▌Hugo Sesselberg (Civic Securities) 0.9%
New York 7	John J. Delaney	Democratic	1931	Incumbent re-elected.	▌ ✓ John J. Delaney (Democratic) 72.5%; ▌Richard W. Thomas (Republican) 19.5%; ▌David M. Cory (Socialist) 6.4%; ▌Emanuel Levin (Communist) 1.6%
New York 8	Patrick J. Carley	Democratic	1926	Incumbent re-elected.	▌ ✓ Patrick J. Carley (Democratic) 62.1%; ▌Daniel Edelman (Republican) 21.8%; ▌Baruch C. Vladeck (Socialist) 14.1%; ▌Louis De Santer (Communist) 2.0%
New York 9	Stephen A. Rudd	Democratic	1931	Incumbent re-elected.	▌ ✓ Stephen A. Rudd (Democratic) 59.9%; ▌James Virdone (Republican) 32.7%; ▌Abraham I. Shiplacoff (Socialist) 6.5%; ▌Richard B. Sullivan (Communist) 0.9%
New York 10	Emanuel Celler	Democratic	1922	Incumbent re-elected.	▌ ✓ Emanuel Celler (Democratic) 63.8%; ▌William A. Ronalds (Republican) 24.8%; ▌Louis Sadoff (Socialist) 9.3%; ▌Harry Friedman (Communist) 2.0%
New York 11	Anning S. Prall	Democratic	1923	Incumbent re-elected.	▌ ✓ Anning S. Prall (Democratic) 69.2%; ▌Frank Homer Fay (Republican) 27.9%; ▌Walter Dearing (Socialist) 2.8%
New York 12	Samuel Dickstein	Democratic	1922	Incumbent re-elected.	▌ ✓ Samuel Dickstein (Democratic) 86.5%; ▌Henry Steinberg (Republican) 8.4%; ▌Abraham P. Conan (Socialist) 3.3%; ▌Richard Follops (Independent) 1.6%; ▌Lodian Lodian (Independent) 0.2%
New York 13	Christopher D. Sullivan	Democratic	1916	Incumbent re-elected.	▌ ✓ Christopher D. Sullivan (Democratic) 86.5%; ▌John Rosenberg (Republican) 9.9%; ▌Evelyn W. Hughan (Socialist) 2.7%; ▌John Steuben (Independent) 0.9%
New York 14	William I. Sirovich	Democratic	1926	Incumbent re-elected.	▌ ✓ William I. Sirovich (Democratic) 60.7%; ▌Henry A. Lowenberg (Republican) 28.3%; ▌August Claessens (Socialist) 8.0%; ▌Abraham Markoff (Independent) 3.0%
New York 15	John J. Boylan	Democratic	1922	Incumbent re-elected.	▌ ✓ John J. Boylan (Democratic) 80.9%; ▌Charles Condert Nast (Republican) 16.1%; ▌William E. Bohn (Socialist) 2.3%; ▌Harry Raymond (Independent) 0.7%
New York 16	John J. O'Connor	Democratic	1923	Incumbent re-elected.	▌ ✓ John J. O'Connor (Democratic) 67.1%; ▌Eugene S. Taliaferro (Republican) 28.3%; ▌Bertha Mailly (Socialist) 3.5%; ▌Carl Hacker (Independent) 1.1%
New York 17	Ruth Baker Pratt	Republican	1928	Incumbent lost re-election. Democratic gain.	▌ ✓ Theodore A. Peyser (Democratic) 52.9%; ▌Ruth Baker Pratt (Republican) 43.3%; ▌Alexander Kahn (Socialist) 3.0%; ▌George Hiram Mann (Independent) 0.8%
New York 18	Martin J. Kennedy	Democratic	1930	Incumbent re-elected.	▌ ✓ Martin J. Kennedy (Democratic) 75.1%; ▌Patrick S. Hickey (Republican) 19.9%; ▌Emerich Steinberger (Socialist) 3.9%; ▌Pauline Rogers (Independent) 1.1%
New York 19	Sol Bloom	Democratic	1923	Incumbent re-elected.	▌ ✓ Sol Bloom (Democratic) 69.0%; ▌William L. Carns (Republican) 26.2%; ▌Reinhold Niebuhr (Socialist) 4.3%; ▌Mary L. H. Brooks (Independent) 0.5%
New York 20	Fiorello La Guardia	Republican	1922	Incumbent lost re-election. Democratic gain.	▌ ✓ James J. Lanzetta (Democratic) 50.7%; ▌Fiorello La Guardia (Republican) 47.0%; ▌Frank Poree (Socialist) 1.4%; ▌Earl Browder (Independent) 1.0%
New York 21	Joseph A. Gavagan	Democratic	1929	Incumbent re-elected.	▌ ✓ Joseph A. Gavagan (Democratic) 64.6%; ▌Oscar J. Smith (Republican) 27.7%; ▌Frank Crosswaith (Socialist) 7.1%; ▌Elinor C. Henderson (Independent) 0.7%
New York 22	Anthony J. Griffin	Democratic	1918	Incumbent re-elected.	▌ ✓ Anthony J. Griffin (Democratic) 76.7%; ▌Wilbur J. Murphy (Republican) 17.6%; ▌Tyrell Wilson (Socialist) 4.5%; ▌Helen Gerson (Independent) 1.3%
New York 23	Frank Oliver	Democratic	1922	Incumbent re-elected.	▌ ✓ Frank Oliver (Democratic) 69.5%; ▌Samuel J. Krinn (Republican) 16.7%; ▌Samuel Orr (Socialist) 11.3%; ▌Carl Prodsky (Independent) 2.5%
New York 24	James M. Fitzpatrick	Democratic	1926	Incumbent re-elected.	▌ ✓ James M. Fitzpatrick (Democratic) 60.1%; ▌Benjamin L. Fairchild (Republican) 30.4%; ▌Esther Friedman (Socialist) 7.2%; ▌Moissaye J. Olgin (Communist) 2.2%; ▌Alexander Wascin (Jeffersonian) 0.2%
New York 25	Charles D. Millard	Republican	1930	Incumbent re-elected.	▌ ✓ Charles D. Millard (Republican) 54.3%; ▌Jesse B. Perlman (Democratic) 42.5%; ▌Carl O. Parsons (Socialist) 1.7%; ▌David E. Hartshorn (Law) 1.6%
New York 26	Hamilton Fish Jr.	Republican	1920	Incumbent re-elected.	▌ ✓ Hamilton Fish Jr. (Republican) 58.3%; ▌Roslyn M. Cox (Democratic) 40.8%; ▌Albert W. Brower (Socialist) 0.8%
New York 27	Harcourt J. Pratt	Republican	1924	Incumbent retired. Republican hold.	▌ ✓ Philip A. Goodwin (Republican) 52.5%; ▌Clifford L. Miller (Democratic) 46.5%; ▌Milo C. Myers (Socialist) 0.9%
New York 28	Parker Corning	Democratic	1922	Incumbent re-elected.	▌ ✓ Parker Corning (Democratic) 64.7%; ▌Isaac G. Braman (Republican) 34.7%; ▌Allin Depew (Socialist) 0.6%
New York 29	James S. Parker	Republican	1912	Incumbent re-elected.	▌ ✓ James S. Parker (Republican) 57.8%; ▌John J. Nyhoff (Democratic) 41.5%; ▌Coleman B. Cheney (Socialist) 0.7%
New York 30	Frank Crowther	Republican	1918	Incumbent re-elected.	▌ ✓ Frank Crowther (Republican) 55.5%; ▌George D. Lambertson (Democratic) 42.3%; ▌Herbert M. Merrill (Socialist) 2.2%
New York 31	Bertrand Snell	Republican	1915	Incumbent re-elected.	▌ ✓ Bertrand Snell (Republican) 57.5%; ▌Kenneth Gardner (Democratic) 42.1%; ▌George E. Brassard (Socialist) 0.4%
New York 32	Francis D. Culkin	Republican	1928	Incumbent re-elected.	▌ ✓ Francis D. Culkin (Republican) 61.8%; ▌John C. Purcell (Democratic) 37.3%; ▌James A. Manson (Socialist) 0.8%
New York 33	Frederick M. Davenport	Republican	1924	Incumbent lost re-election. Democratic gain.	▌ ✓ Fred Sisson (Democratic) 50.0%; ▌Frederick M. Davenport (Republican) 49.0%; ▌Otto L. Endres (Socialist) 1.0%
New York 34	John D. Clarke	Republican	1926	Incumbent re-elected.	▌ ✓ John D. Clarke (Republican) 53.2%; ▌Charles R. Seymour (Democratic) 40.0%; ▌Leon Ray Steenburg (Law) 6.1%; ▌Pierre De Nie (Socialist) 0.7%
New York 35	Clarence E. Hancock	Republican	1927	Incumbent re-elected.	▌ ✓ Clarence E. Hancock (Republican) 55.6%; ▌Edmund L. Weston (Democratic) 42.3%; ▌Walter B. McNinch (Socialist) 2.1%
New York 36	John Taber	Republican	1922	Incumbent re-elected.	▌ ✓ John Taber (Republican) 60.9%; ▌Lithgow Osborne (Democratic) 38.2%; ▌Esther Wright (Socialist) 0.9%
New York 37	Gale H. Stalker	Republican	1922	Incumbent re-elected.	▌ ✓ Gale H. Stalker (Republican) 52.4%; ▌Julian P. Bretz (Democratic) 45.6%; ▌Edward Amherst Ott (Socialist) 1.3%; ▌John D. Driscoll (Liberal) 0.7%
New York 38	James L. Whitley	Republican	1928	Incumbent re-elected.	▌ ✓ James L. Whitley (Republican) 46.2%; ▌Charles Stanton (Democratic) 42.4%; ▌Arthur Rathjen (Law) 8.7%; ▌Richard M. Briggs (Socialist) 2.6%
New York 39	Archie D. Sanders	Republican	1916	Incumbent retired. Republican hold.	▌ ✓ James W. Wadsworth Jr. (Republican) 47.1%; ▌David A. White (Democratic) 32.8%; ▌Ernest R. Clark (Law) 18.7%; ▌Martin T. Cook (Socialist) 1.4%
New York 40	Walter G. Andrews	Republican	1930	Incumbent re-elected.	▌ ✓ Walter G. Andrews (Republican) 61.7%; ▌Ralph W. Nolan (Democratic) 36.1%; ▌Herman J. Hahn (Independent) 2.1%
New York 41	Edmund F. Cooke	Republican	1928	Incumbent lost re-election. Democratic gain.	▌ ✓ Alfred F. Beiter (Democratic) 50.1%; ▌Edmund F. Cooke (Republican) 47.4%; ▌Robert A. Hoffman (Socialist) 2.5%
New York 42	James M. Mead	Democratic	1918	Incumbent re-elected.	▌ ✓ James M. Mead (Democratic) 62.0%; ▌Henry Adsit Bull (Republican) 36.4%; ▌Marklet H. Harding (Socialist) 1.7%
New York 43	Daniel A. Reed	Republican	1918	Incumbent re-elected.	▌ ✓ Daniel A. Reed (Republican) 60.0%; ▌Gerald A. Herrick (Democratic) 37.1%; ▌John C. Cooper (Socialist) 2.9%
New York at-large (2 seats)	None (new seat)			New seat. Democratic gain.	Elected on a general ticket: ▌ ✓ Elmer E. Studley (Democratic) 27.2%; ▌ ✓ John Fitzgibbons (Democratic) 26.9%; ▌Nicholas Howard Pinto (Republican) 20.2%; ▌Sherman J. Lowell (Republican) 20.0%; ▌G. August Gerber (Socialist) 1.9%; ▌Fred Sander (Socialist) 1.9%; ▌Elizabeth Smart (Law) 0.9%; ▌J. Elmer Cates (Law) 0.8%; ▌Jacob Berlin (Socialist Labor) 0.1%; ▌O. Martin Olson (Socialist Labor) 0.1%
New York at-large (2 seats)	None (new seat)			New seat. Democratic gain.	Elected on a general ticket: ▌ ✓ Elmer E. Studley (Democratic) 27.2%; ▌ ✓ John Fitzgibbons (Democratic) 26.9%; ▌Nicholas Howard Pinto (Republican) 20.2%; ▌Sherman J. Lowell (Republican) 20.0%; ▌G. August Gerber (Socialist) 1.9%; ▌Fred Sander (Socialist) 1.9%; ▌Elizabeth Smart (Law) 0.9%; ▌J. Elmer Cates (Law) 0.8%; ▌Jacob Berlin (Socialist Labor) 0.1%; ▌O. Martin Olson (Socialist Labor) 0.1%

== North Carolina ==
District	Incumbent			This race	
District	Member	Party	First elected	Results	Candidates
North Carolina 1	Lindsay C. Warren	Democratic	1924	Incumbent re-elected.	▌ ✓ Lindsay C. Warren (Democratic) 90.8%; ▌John B. Respess (Republican) 9.2%
North Carolina 2	John H. Kerr	Democratic	1923	Incumbent re-elected.	▌ ✓ John H. Kerr (Democratic) 96.0%; ▌B. B. Howell (Republican) 4.0%
North Carolina 3	Charles L. Abernethy	Democratic	1922	Incumbent re-elected.	▌ ✓ Charles L. Abernethy (Democratic) 73.2%; ▌H. B. Ivey (Republican) 26.8%
North Carolina 4	Edward W. Pou	Democratic	1900	Incumbent re-elected.	▌ ✓ Edward W. Pou (Democratic) 76.0%; ▌L. P. Dixon (Republican) 24.0%
North Carolina 5	Franklin Wills Hancock Jr.	Democratic	1930	Incumbent re-elected.	▌ ✓ Franklin Wills Hancock Jr. (Democratic) 70.2%; ▌L. L. Wall (Republican) 29.8%
North Carolina 6	None (new district)			New seat. Democratic gain.	▌ ✓ William B. Umstead (Democratic) 67.8%; ▌William I. Ward (Republican) 32.2%
North Carolina 7	J. Bayard Clark; Redistricted from the 4th district	Democratic	1928	Incumbent re-elected.	▌ ✓ J. Bayard Clark (Democratic) 80.4%; ▌J. M. Byrd (Republican) 19.6%
North Carolina 8	Walter Lambeth; Redistricted from the 7th district	Democratic	1930	Incumbent re-elected.	▌ ✓ Walter Lambeth (Democratic) 65.4%; ▌A. H. Ragan (Republican) 34.6%
North Carolina 9	Robert L. Doughton; Redistricted from the 8th district	Democratic	1910	Incumbent re-elected.	▌ ✓ Robert L. Doughton (Democratic) 63.5%; ▌P. P. Dulin (Republican) 36.5%
North Carolina 10	Alfred L. Bulwinkle; Redistricted from the 9th district	Democratic	1930	Incumbent re-elected.	▌ ✓ Alfred L. Bulwinkle (Democratic) 59.7%; ▌Charles A. Jonas (Republican) 40.3%
North Carolina 11	Zebulon Weaver; Redistricted from the 10th district	Democratic	1930	Incumbent re-elected.	▌ ✓ Zebulon Weaver (Democratic) 62.3%; ▌Crawford F. James (Republican) 37.7%

== North Dakota ==
North Dakota was reapportioned from 3 seats to 2, and elected them at large.

District	Incumbent			This race	
District	Member	Party	First elected	Results	Candidates
North Dakota at-large (2 seats)	James H. Sinclair; Redistricted from the 3rd district	Republican	1918	Incumbent re-elected.	Elected on a general ticket: ▌ ✓ James H. Sinclair (Republican) 33.9%; ▌ ✓ William Lemke (Republican-NPL) 31.8%; ▌W. D. Lynch (Democratic) 17.1%; ▌R. B. Murphy (Democratic) 16.9%; ▌Pat J. Barrett (Independent) 0.2%; ▌Ella Reeve Bloor (Independent) 0.2%
North Dakota at-large (2 seats)	Olger B. Burtness; Redistricted from the 1st district	Republican	1920	Incumbent lost renomination. Republican hold.	Elected on a general ticket: ▌ ✓ James H. Sinclair (Republican) 33.9%; ▌ ✓ William Lemke (Republican-NPL) 31.8%; ▌W. D. Lynch (Democratic) 17.1%; ▌R. B. Murphy (Democratic) 16.9%; ▌Pat J. Barrett (Independent) 0.2%; ▌Ella Reeve Bloor (Independent) 0.2%
North Dakota at-large (2 seats)	Thomas Hall; Redistricted from the 2nd district	Republican	1922	Incumbent lost renomination. Republican loss.	Elected on a general ticket: ▌ ✓ James H. Sinclair (Republican) 33.9%; ▌ ✓ William Lemke (Republican-NPL) 31.8%; ▌W. D. Lynch (Democratic) 17.1%; ▌R. B. Murphy (Democratic) 16.9%; ▌Pat J. Barrett (Independent) 0.2%; ▌Ella Reeve Bloor (Independent) 0.2%

== Ohio ==
District	Incumbent			This race	
District	Member	Party	First elected	Results	Candidates
Ohio 1	John B. Hollister	Republican	1931	Incumbent re-elected.	▌ ✓ John B. Hollister (Republican) 54.4%; ▌Edward H. Brink (Democratic) 45.6%
Ohio 2	William E. Hess	Republican	1928	Incumbent re-elected.	▌ ✓ William E. Hess (Republican) 50.7%; ▌Edward F. Alexander (Democratic) 49.3%
Ohio 3	Byron B. Harlan	Democratic	1930	Incumbent re-elected.	▌ ✓ Byron B. Harlan (Democratic) 54.8%; ▌Edith McClure Patterson (Republican) 42.6%; ▌Jere F. Mincher (Socialist) 2.7%
Ohio 4	John L. Cable	Republican	1928	Incumbent lost re-election. Democratic gain.	▌ ✓ Frank L. Kloeb (Democratic) 54.6%; ▌John L. Cable (Republican) 45.4%
Ohio 5	Frank C. Kniffin	Democratic	1930	Incumbent re-elected.	▌ ✓ Frank C. Kniffin (Democratic) 60.0%; ▌William L. Manahan (Republican) 40.0%
Ohio 6	James G. Polk	Democratic	1930	Incumbent re-elected.	▌ ✓ James G. Polk (Democratic) 56.2%; ▌Mack Sauer (Republican) 43.8%
Ohio 7	Charles Brand	Republican	1922	Incumbent retired. Republican hold.	▌ ✓ Leroy T. Marshall (Republican) 53.0%; ▌Aaron J. Halloran (Democratic) 47.0%
Ohio 8	Grant E. Mouser	Republican	1928	Incumbent lost re-election. Democratic gain.	▌ ✓ Thomas B. Fletcher (Democratic) 52.7%; ▌Grant E. Mouser (Republican) 47.3%
Ohio 9	Wilbur M. White	Republican	1930	Incumbent lost re-election. Democratic gain.	▌ ✓ Warren J. Duffey (Democratic) 47.7%; ▌Wilbur M. White (Republican) 45.4%; ▌Silas E. Hurin (Independent) 3.5%; ▌Clyde E. Kiker (Independent) 1.8%; ▌Karl Pauli (Socialist) 1.1%; ▌Eugene Stoll (Communist) 0.5%
Ohio 10	Thomas A. Jenkins	Republican	1924	Incumbent re-elected.	▌ ✓ Thomas A. Jenkins (Republican) 58.9%; ▌Charles M. Hogan (Democratic) 41.1%
Ohio 11	Mell G. Underwood	Democratic	1922	Incumbent re-elected.	▌ ✓ Mell G. Underwood (Democratic) 63.0%; ▌David J. Lewis (Republican) 37.0%
Ohio 12	Arthur P. Lamneck	Democratic	1930	Incumbent re-elected.	▌ ✓ Arthur P. Lamneck (Democratic) 50.2%; ▌John C. Speaks (Republican) 49.8%
Ohio 13	William L. Fiesinger	Democratic	1930	Incumbent re-elected.	▌ ✓ William L. Fiesinger (Democratic) 58.9%; ▌Walter E. Kruger (Republican) 41.1%
Ohio 14	Francis Seiberling	Republican	1928	Incumbent lost re-election. Democratic gain.	▌ ✓ Dow W. Harter (Democratic) 53.9%; ▌Francis Seiberling (Republican) 45.7%; ▌I. B. Hinman (Communist) 0.4%
Ohio 15	C. Ellis Moore	Republican	1918	Incumbent lost re-election. Democratic gain.	▌ ✓ Robert T. Secrest (Democratic) 56.6%; ▌C. Ellis Moore (Republican) 42.9%; ▌Joseph H. Ewing (Independent) 0.5%
Ohio 16	Charles B. McClintock	Republican	1928	Incumbent lost re-election. Democratic gain.	▌ ✓ William R. Thom (Democratic) 51.5%; ▌Charles B. McClintock (Republican) 48.5%
Ohio 17	Charles West	Democratic	1930	Incumbent re-elected.	▌ ✓ Charles West (Democratic) 51.7%; ▌William M. Morgan (Republican) 48.3%
Ohio 18	B. Frank Murphy	Republican	1918	Incumbent lost re-election. Democratic gain.	▌ ✓ Lawrence E. Imhoff (Democratic) 50.2%; ▌B. Frank Murphy (Republican) 49.8%
Ohio 19	John G. Cooper	Republican	1914	Incumbent re-elected.	▌ ✓ John G. Cooper (Republican) 53.3%; ▌D. F. Dunlavy (Democratic) 46.5%; ▌John S. Ruth (Independent) 0.1%; ▌Harold G. Bickler (Independent) 0.03%
Ohio 20	Martin L. Sweeney	Democratic	1931	Incumbent re-elected.	▌ ✓ Martin L. Sweeney (Democratic) 98.8%; ▌John Fromholz (Communist) 1.2%
Ohio 21	Robert Crosser	Democratic	1922	Incumbent re-elected.	▌ ✓ Robert Crosser (Democratic) 65.2%; ▌Gerald Pilliod (Republican) 33.7%; ▌Joseph Schiffer (Communist) 0.9%; ▌Eugene F. Cheeks (Independent) 0.3%
Ohio 22	Chester C. Bolton	Republican	1928	Incumbent re-elected.	▌ ✓ Chester C. Bolton (Republican) 58.7%; ▌Florence E. Allen (Democratic) 40.9%; ▌G. Racheff (Communist) 0.3%; ▌Joe T. Thomas (Independent) 0.2%
Ohio at-large	None (new seat)			New seat. Democratic gain.	▌ ✓ Charles V. Truax (Democratic) 25.8%; ▌ ✓ Stephen M. Young (Democratic) 25.7%; ▌George H. Bender (Republican) 23.7%; ▌L. T. Palmer (Republican) 23.6%; ▌Edward R. Stafford (Prohibition) 0.5%; ▌Alfred H. Stratton (Prohibition) 0.4%; ▌John Rehms (Communist) 0.2%; ▌William Hughey (Communist) 0.1%
Ohio at-large	None (new seat)			New seat. Democratic gain.	▌ ✓ Charles V. Truax (Democratic) 25.8%; ▌ ✓ Stephen M. Young (Democratic) 25.7%; ▌George H. Bender (Republican) 23.7%; ▌L. T. Palmer (Republican) 23.6%; ▌Edward R. Stafford (Prohibition) 0.5%; ▌Alfred H. Stratton (Prohibition) 0.4%; ▌John Rehms (Communist) 0.2%; ▌William Hughey (Communist) 0.1%

== Oklahoma ==
District	Incumbent			This race	
District	Member	Party	First elected	Results	Candidates
Oklahoma 1	Wesley E. Disney	Democratic	1930	Incumbent re-elected.	▌ ✓ Wesley E. Disney (Democratic) 63.3%; ▌Frank Frantz (Republican) 36.3%; ▌A. F. Sweeney (Independent) 0.5%
Oklahoma 2	William W. Hastings	Democratic	1922	Incumbent re-elected.	▌ ✓ William W. Hastings (Democratic) 70.5%; ▌William F. Head (Republican) 29.5%
Oklahoma 3	Wilburn Cartwright	Democratic	1926	Incumbent re-elected.	▌ ✓ Wilburn Cartwright (Democratic) 85.2%; ▌Walter Colbert (Republican) 14.8%
Oklahoma 4	Tom D. McKeown	Democratic	1922	Incumbent re-elected.	▌ ✓ Tom D. McKeown (Democratic) 75.5%; ▌E. W. Kemp (Republican) 24.5%
Oklahoma 5	Fletcher B. Swank	Democratic	1930	Incumbent re-elected.	▌ ✓ Fletcher B. Swank (Democratic) 64.2%; ▌Paul Huston (Republican) 35.8%
Oklahoma 6	Jed Johnson	Democratic	1926	Incumbent re-elected.	▌ ✓ Jed Johnson (Democratic) 79.3%; ▌George E. Young (Republican) 20.7%
Oklahoma 7	James V. McClintic	Democratic	1914	Incumbent re-elected.	▌ ✓ James V. McClintic (Democratic) 77.9%; ▌W. G. Roe (Republican) 15.6%; ▌T. H. McLemore (Independent) 6.5%
Oklahoma 8	Milton C. Garber	Republican	1922	Incumbent lost re-election. Democratic gain.	▌ ✓ E. W. Marland (Democratic) 61.3%; ▌Milton C. Garber (Republican) 37.8%; ▌W. E. Knapp (Independent) 0.8%; ▌Alfred Reynolds (Independent) 0.2%
Oklahoma at-large	None (new district)			New seat. Democratic gain.	▌ ✓ Will Rogers (Democratic) 72.8%; ▌R. A. Howard (Republican) 26.7%; ▌George E. Taylor (Independent) 0.3%; ▌R. J. Shive (Independent) 0.2%

== Oregon ==
District	Incumbent			This race	
District	Member	Party	First elected	Results	Candidates
Oregon 1	Willis C. Hawley	Republican	1906	Incumbent lost renomination. Republican hold.	▌ ✓ James W. Mott (Republican) 51.2%; ▌Harvey G. Starkweather (Democratic) 37.3%; ▌W. J. Butler (Independent) 7.7%; ▌Lee Giddings (Socialist) 2.6%; ▌Upton A. Upton (Socialist Labor) 1.1%
Oregon 2	Robert R. Butler	Republican	1928	Incumbent lost re-election. Democratic gain.	▌ ✓ Walter M. Pierce (Democratic) 48.2%; ▌Robert R. Butler (Republican) 40.1%; ▌Hugh E. Brady (Independent) 8.2%; ▌O. D. Teel (Socialist) 2.0%; ▌Paul F. Schnur (Socialist Labor) 1.5%
Oregon 3	Charles H. Martin	Democratic	1930	Incumbent re-elected.	▌ ✓ Charles H. Martin (Democratic) 59.0%; ▌Homer D. Angell (Republican) 32.2%; ▌Albert Streiff (Socialist) 4.0%; ▌H. H. Stallard (Independent) 2.9%; ▌Carl V. Soderback (Socialist Labor) 1.0%; ▌Richard L. Lovelace (Communist) 0.9%

== Pennsylvania ==
District	Incumbent			This race	
District	Member	Party	First elected	Results	Candidates
Pennsylvania 1	Harry C. Ransley; Redistricted from the 3rd district	Republican	1920	Incumbent re-elected.	▌ ✓ Harry C. Ransley (Republican) 91.5%; ▌Harry T. Glenn (Fair Play) 6.9%; ▌G. Kutikoff (Socialist) 1.1%; ▌C. Litta (Communist) 0.5%
Pennsylvania 2	James M. Beck; Redistricted from the 1st district	Republican	1927	Incumbent re-elected.	▌ ✓ James M. Beck (Republican) 59.2%; ▌John J. Shanahan (Democratic) 38.7%; ▌Andrew J. Biemiller (Socialist) 1.6%; ▌David Davis (Communist) 0.5%
Pennsylvania 3	Robert Lee Davis; Redistricted from the 6th district	Republican	1932	Incumbent retired. Republican hold.	▌ ✓ Alfred M. Waldron (Republican) 57.4%; ▌Frank M. O'Brien (Democratic) 40.6%; ▌Joseph Kazmark (Socialist) 1.6%; ▌Thomas Nabried (Communist) 0.3%
Pennsylvania 4	Benjamin M. Golder	Republican	1924	Incumbent lost renomination. Republican hold.	▌ ✓ George W. Edmonds (Republican) 52.9%; ▌William J. O'Rourke (Democratic) 44.4%; ▌Joseph Schwartz (Socialist) 2.1%; ▌Morris H. Powers (Communist) 0.6%
Pennsylvania 5	James J. Connolly	Republican	1920	Incumbent re-elected.	▌ ✓ James J. Connolly (Republican) 55.4%; ▌Carroll J. Agnew (Democratic) 40.5%; ▌Franz E. Daniel (Socialist) 3.8%; ▌Ernest Kornfeld (Communist) 0.3%
Pennsylvania 6	Edward L. Stokes; Redistricted from the 2nd district	Republican	1931	Incumbent re-elected.	▌ ✓ Edward L. Stokes (Republican) 51.0%; ▌Harry V. Dougherty (Democratic) 46.0%; ▌M. H. Goldstein (Socialist) 2.3%; ▌Charles C. Hopkins (Prohibition) 0.8%
Pennsylvania 7	George P. Darrow	Republican	1914	Incumbent re-elected.	▌ ✓ George P. Darrow (Republican) 62.2%; ▌James C. Crumlish (Democratic) 35.2%; ▌David H. H. Felix (Socialist) 2.6%; ▌Thomas F. Lester (Liberal) 0.06%
Pennsylvania 8	James Wolfenden	Republican	1928	Incumbent re-elected.	▌ ✓ James Wolfenden (Republican) 65.8%; ▌Matthew Randall (Democratic) 30.1%; ▌Jesse Holmes (Socialist) 2.7%; ▌C. Wilfred Conard (Prohibition) 1.4%
Pennsylvania 9	Henry Winfield Watson	Republican	1914	Incumbent re-elected.	▌ ✓ Henry Winfield Watson (Republican) 50.3%; ▌Norton Lichtenwalner (Democratic) 46.3%; ▌Walter L. Huhn (Socialist) 3.5%
Pennsylvania 9	Norton Lichtenwalner; Redistricted from the 14th district.	Democratic	1930	Incumbent lost re-election. Democratic loss.	▌ ✓ Henry Winfield Watson (Republican) 50.3%; ▌Norton Lichtenwalner (Democratic) 46.3%; ▌Walter L. Huhn (Socialist) 3.5%
Pennsylvania 10	J. Roland Kinzer	Republican	1930	Incumbent re-elected.	▌ ✓ J. Roland Kinzer (Republican) 61.5%; ▌Richard P. McGrann (Democratic) 36.2%; ▌Frank Scott Jr. (Socialist) 2.3%
Pennsylvania 11	Patrick J. Boland	Democratic	1930	Incumbent re-elected.	▌ ✓ Patrick J. Boland (Democratic) 95.9%; ▌George Hart (Prohibition) 4.1%
Pennsylvania 12	C. Murray Turpin	Republican	1929	Incumbent re-elected.	▌ ✓ C. Murray Turpin (Republican) 50.8%; ▌John J. Casey (Democratic) 49.2%
Pennsylvania 13	George F. Brumm	Republican	1928	Incumbent re-elected.	▌ ✓ George F. Brumm (Republican) 90.9%; ▌Frederick W. Magrady (Prohibition) 4.7%; ▌Anthony Malinowski (Socialist) 4.1%; ▌Peter Schwartz (Communist) 0.3%
Pennsylvania 13	Frederick W. Magrady; Redistricted from the 17th district	Republican	1924	Incumbent lost renomination, ran and lost on Prohibition Party ticket. Republican loss.	▌ ✓ George F. Brumm (Republican) 90.9%; ▌Frederick W. Magrady (Prohibition) 4.7%; ▌Anthony Malinowski (Socialist) 4.1%; ▌Peter Schwartz (Communist) 0.3%
Pennsylvania 14	None (new district)			New seat. Democratic hold.	▌ ✓ William E. Richardson (Democratic) 41.0%; ▌Thomas L. Rhoads (Republican) 31.9%; ▌Raymond S. Hofses (Socialist) 26.9%; ▌George W. Brownback (Independent) 0.1%; ▌Florence Cassel (Liberal) 0.001%
Pennsylvania 15	Louis T. McFadden	Republican	1914	Incumbent re-elected.	▌ ✓ Louis T. McFadden (Republican) 96.0%; ▌Henry L. Springer (Socialist) 4.0%
Pennsylvania 16	Robert F. Rich	Republican	1930	Incumbent re-elected.	▌ ✓ Robert F. Rich (Republican) 63.6%; ▌Paul A. Rothfuss (Democratic) 34.1%; ▌W. A. Hall (Socialist) 2.4%
Pennsylvania 17	None (new district)			New seat. Republican gain.	▌ ✓ J. William Ditter (Republican) 59.9%; ▌Philip Childs Pendleton (Democratic) 32.8%; ▌Mary Winsor (Socialist) 2.9%; ▌S. Earle Hoover (Prohibition) 2.4%; ▌Francis R. Taylor (Prohibition) 2.0%
Pennsylvania 18	Edward M. Beers	Republican	1922	Incumbent died. Republican hold. Winner was not elected to finish the current term.	▌ ✓ Benjamin K. Focht (Republican) 48.3%; ▌Harry Rippman (Democratic) 32.3%; ▌Omer B. Poulson (Citizens) 19.4%
Pennsylvania 19	Isaac H. Doutrich	Republican	1926	Incumbent re-elected.	▌ ✓ Isaac H. Doutrich (Republican) 58.1%; ▌Carl K. Deen (Democratic) 37.1%; ▌Samuel Young (Socialist) 2.5%; ▌B. E. P. Prugh (Prohibition) 2.3%
Pennsylvania 20	Thomas Cunningham Cochran; Redistricted from the 28th district	Republican	1926	Incumbent re-elected.	▌ ✓ Thomas Cunningham Cochran (Republican) 53.6%; ▌D. J. Driscoll (Democratic) 46.4%
Pennsylvania 21	William R. Coyle; Redistricted from the 30th district	Republican	1928	Incumbent lost re-election. Democratic gain.	▌ ✓ Francis E. Walter (Democratic) 52.7%; ▌William R. Coyle (Republican) 45.1%; ▌Simon R. Hartzell (Socialist) 2.2%
Pennsylvania 22	Harry L. Haines	Democratic	1930	Incumbent re-elected.	▌ ✓ Harry L. Haines (Democratic) 58.3%; ▌Leighton C. Taylor (Republican) 40.3%; ▌Percy K. Coover (Socialist) 1.4%
Pennsylvania 23	J. Mitchell Chase	Republican	1926	Incumbent lost renomination. Republican loss.	▌ ✓ J. Banks Kurtz (Republican) 49.2%; ▌Frederick B. Kerr (Democratic) 47.2%; ▌Charles D. Rockel (Socialist) 3.6%
Pennsylvania 23	J. Banks Kurtz; Redistricted from the 21st district	Republican	1922	Incumbent re-elected.	▌ ✓ J. Banks Kurtz (Republican) 49.2%; ▌Frederick B. Kerr (Democratic) 47.2%; ▌Charles D. Rockel (Socialist) 3.6%
Pennsylvania 24	Samuel A. Kendall	Republican	1918	Incumbent lost re-election. Democratic gain.	▌ ✓ J. Buell Snyder (Democratic) 53.4%; ▌Samuel A. Kendall (Republican) 44.7%; ▌David Rinne (Socialist) 1.8%
Pennsylvania 25	Henry W. Temple	Republican	1912	Incumbent lost re-election. Democratic gain.	▌ ✓ Charles I. Faddis (Democratic) 56.1%; ▌Henry W. Temple (Republican) 41.7%; ▌Frank A. Silvis (Socialist) 2.2%
Pennsylvania 26	J. Howard Swick	Republican	1926	Incumbent re-elected.	▌ ✓ J. Howard Swick (Republican) 54.0%; ▌Sam B. Wilson (Democratic) 46.0%
Pennsylvania 27	Nathan L. Strong	Republican	1916	Incumbent re-elected.	▌ ✓ Nathan L. Strong (Republican) 50.7%; ▌D. A. Dorn (Democratic) 41.0%; ▌Robert McEldowney (Liberal) 4.6%; ▌William C. Widdowson (Socialist) 2.5%; ▌Donald J. Perry (Jobless) 0.8%; ▌Alexander S. Ryesky (Communist) 0.4%
Pennsylvania 27	Howard W. Stull; Redistricted from the 20th district	Republican	1932	Incumbent lost renomination. Republican loss.	▌ ✓ Nathan L. Strong (Republican) 50.7%; ▌D. A. Dorn (Democratic) 41.0%; ▌Robert McEldowney (Liberal) 4.6%; ▌William C. Widdowson (Socialist) 2.5%; ▌Donald J. Perry (Jobless) 0.8%; ▌Alexander S. Ryesky (Communist) 0.4%
Pennsylvania 28	Adam Wyant; Redistricted from the 31st district	Republican	1920	Incumbent lost re-election. Democratic gain.	▌ ✓ William M. Berlin (Democratic) 55.2%; ▌Adam Wyant (Republican) 40.8%; ▌A. W. Zornick (Socialist) 4.0%
Pennsylvania 29	Milton W. Shreve	Republican	1918	Incumbent lost re-election. Democratic gain.	▌ ✓ Charles N. Crosby (Democratic) 50.1%; ▌Milton W. Shreve (Republican) 46.6%; ▌F. Lindy (Socialist) 3.1%; ▌Leo Mittelmeier (Communist) 0.2%
Pennsylvania 30	Edmund F. Erk; Redistricted from the 32nd district	Republican	1930	Incumbent lost re-election. Democratic gain.	▌ ✓ J. Twing Brooks (Democratic) 47.2%; ▌Edmund F. Erk (Republican) 47.0%; ▌Sarah Z. Limbach (Socialist) 3.4%; ▌Robert Hervey (Prohibition) 1.6%; ▌Edwin A. Glenn (Peoples) 0.8%
Pennsylvania 31	M. Clyde Kelly; Redistricted from the 33rd district	Republican	1916	Incumbent re-elected.	▌ ✓ M. Clyde Kelly (Republican) 85.5%; ▌Leo O. Guthrie (Repeal Volstead) 7.5%; ▌William B. Kane (Socialist) 7.0%
Pennsylvania 32	Patrick J. Sullivan; Redistricted from the 34th district	Republican	1928	Incumbent lost renomination. Republican hold.	▌ ✓ Michael J. Muldowney (Republican) 53.3%; ▌Anne E. Felix (Democratic) 40.9%; ▌Max Lutsky (Socialist) 2.2%; ▌John W. Grubbs (Prohibition) 1.8%; ▌Patrick J. Sullivan (Independent) 1.5%; ▌Max Jenkins (Communist) 0.4%
Pennsylvania 33	Harry A. Estep; Redistricted from the 35th district	Republican	1926	Incumbent lost re-election. Democratic gain.	▌ ✓ Henry Ellenbogen (Democratic) 52.0%; ▌Harry A. Estep (Republican) 43.9%; ▌Samuel Oshry (Socialist) 2.4%; ▌George Harger (Prohibition) 1.5%; ▌Carl Price (Communist) 0.2%
Pennsylvania 34	Guy E. Campbell; Redistricted from the 36th district	Republican	1916	Incumbent lost re-election. Democratic gain.	▌ ✓ Matthew A. Dunn (Democratic) 49.9%; ▌Guy E. Campbell (Republican) 44.3%; ▌Mary B. Lehner (Socialist) 3.9%; ▌Thomas M. Heard (Prohibition) 1.9%

== Puerto Rico ==
See Non-voting delegates, below.

== Rhode Island ==
District	Incumbent			This race	
District	Member	Party	First elected	Results	Candidates
Rhode Island 1	Clark Burdick	Republican	1918	Incumbent lost re-election. Republican loss.	▌ ✓ Francis Condon (Democratic) 55.6%; ▌Clark Burdick (Republican) 44.2%; ▌Sara M. Algeo (Independent Dry) 0.2%
Rhode Island 1	Francis Condon; Redistricted from the 3rd district	Democratic	1930	Incumbent re-elected.	▌ ✓ Francis Condon (Democratic) 55.6%; ▌Clark Burdick (Republican) 44.2%; ▌Sara M. Algeo (Independent Dry) 0.2%
Rhode Island 2	Richard S. Aldrich	Republican	1922	Incumbent retired. Democratic gain.	▌ ✓ John M. O'Connell (Democratic) 54.8%; ▌Thomas P. Hazard (Republican) 45.0%; ▌Alfred W. Pett (Prohibition) 0.2%

== South Carolina ==
District	Incumbent			This race	
District	Member	Party	First elected	Results	Candidates
South Carolina 1	Thomas S. McMillan	Democratic	1924	Incumbent re-elected.	▌ ✓ Thomas S. McMillan (Democratic) 95.9%; ▌D. C. Sharpe (Republican) 4.1%
South Carolina 2	Hampton P. Fulmer; Redistricted from the 7th district	Democratic	1920	Incumbent re-elected.	▌ ✓ Hampton P. Fulmer (Democratic) 97.9%; ▌D. A. Gardner (Republican) 2.1%
South Carolina 3	Frederick H. Dominick	Democratic	1916	Incumbent lost renomination. Democratic hold.	▌ ✓ John C. Taylor (Democratic) 99.2%; ▌T. Frank McCord (Republican) 0.8%
South Carolina 4	John J. McSwain	Democratic	1920	Incumbent re-elected.	▌ ✓ John J. McSwain (Democratic) 98.4%; ▌Otho Williams (Republican) 1.6%
South Carolina 5	William Francis Stevenson	Democratic	1917	Incumbent lost renomination. Democratic hold.	▌ ✓ James P. Richards (Democratic) 98.5%; ▌G. M. Williams (Republican) 1.5%
South Carolina 6	Allard H. Gasque	Democratic	1922	Incumbent re-elected.	▌ ✓ Allard H. Gasque (Democratic) 98.6%; ▌C. B. Ruffin (Republican) 1.4%

== South Dakota ==
District	Incumbent			This race	
District	Member	Party	First elected	Results	Candidates
South Dakota 1	Charles A. Christopherson	Republican	1918	Incumbent lost re-election. Democratic gain.	▌ ✓ Fred H. Hildebrandt (Democratic) 53.1%; ▌Charles A. Christopherson (Republican) 44.4%; ▌Paul L. Werth (Liberty) 1.6%; ▌Lydia B. Johnson (Independent) 0.7%; ▌Roy Miller (Independent) 0.1%
South Dakota 2	Royal C. Johnson	Republican	1914	Incumbent retired. Republican loss.	▌ ✓ Theodore B. Werner (Democratic) 55.7%; ▌William Williamson (Republican) 43.9%; ▌Arne Jaskela (Independent) 0.4%
South Dakota 2	William Williamson; Redistricted from the 3rd district	Republican	1920	Incumbent lost re-election. Democratic gain.	▌ ✓ Theodore B. Werner (Democratic) 55.7%; ▌William Williamson (Republican) 43.9%; ▌Arne Jaskela (Independent) 0.4%

== Tennessee ==
District	Incumbent			This race	
District	Member	Party	First elected	Results	Candidates
Tennessee 1	Oscar Lovette	Republican	1930	Incumbent lost renomination and re-election as an Independent. Republican hold.	▌ ✓ B. Carroll Reece (Republican) 45.8%; ▌Oscar Lovette (Independent) 42.1%; ▌Albert C. Tipton (Democratic) 12.0%; ▌Jess Smith (Independent) 0.1%; ▌A. Isenberg (Independent) 0.03%
Tennessee 2	J. Will Taylor	Republican	1918	Incumbent re-elected.	▌ ✓ J. Will Taylor (Republican) 57.7%; ▌H. S. Burnett (Democratic) 40.5%; ▌T. J. Rowland (Independent) 1.4%; ▌Jeff Johnson (Independent) 0.4%
Tennessee 3	Sam D. McReynolds	Democratic	1922	Incumbent re-elected.	▌ ✓ Sam D. McReynolds (Democratic) 91.6%; ▌William N. Levan (Republican) 4.0%; ▌Fred Starr (Independent) 3.3%; ▌T. J. Rowland (Independent) 1.0%
Tennessee 4	John Ridley Mitchell	Democratic	1930	Incumbent re-elected.	▌ ✓ John Ridley Mitchell (Democratic) 82.6%; ▌W. H. Crowell (Republican) 15.9%; ▌J. K. Stockton (Independent) 1.5%
Tennessee 5	Ewin L. Davis	Democratic	1918	Incumbent lost renomination. Democratic loss.	▌ ✓ Jo Byrns (Democratic) 87.6%; ▌J. Y. Freeman (Republican) 10.5%; ▌Howard Kester (Independent) 1.9%
Tennessee 5	Jo Byrns; Redistricted from the 6th district	Democratic	1908	Incumbent re-elected.	▌ ✓ Jo Byrns (Democratic) 87.6%; ▌J. Y. Freeman (Republican) 10.5%; ▌Howard Kester (Independent) 1.9%
Tennessee 6	Willa Blake Eslick; Redistricted from the 7th district	Democratic	1932	Incumbent retired. Democratic hold.	▌ ✓ Clarence W. Turner (Democratic) 79.0%; ▌G. C. Stephenson (Democratic) 19.6%; ▌D. J. Bevis (Independent) 1.3%
Tennessee 7	Gordon Browning; Redistricted from the 8th district	Democratic	1922	Incumbent re-elected.	▌ ✓ Gordon Browning (Democratic) 77.8%; ▌Willoughby Stewart (Republican) 21.0%; ▌E. R. Dubose (Independent) 1.2%
Tennessee 8	Jere Cooper; Redistricted from the 9th district	Democratic	1928	Incumbent re-elected.	▌ ✓ Jere Cooper (Democratic) 88.2%; ▌Mary Burnett (Republican) 10.2%; ▌B. S. Duggan (Independent) 1.6%
Tennessee 9	E. H. Crump; Redistricted from the 10th district	Democratic	1930	Incumbent re-elected.	▌ ✓ E. H. Crump (Democratic) 90.1%; ▌S. A. Godsey (Republican) 7.0%; ▌Ollie L. Overton (Independent) 1.5%; ▌Robert H. Gowling (Independent) 1.1%; ▌Theodore W. Lorwell (Independent) 0.4%

== Texas ==
District	Incumbent			This race	
District	Member	Party	First elected	Results	Candidates
Texas 1	Wright Patman	Democratic	1928	Incumbent re-elected.	▌ ✓ Wright Patman (Democratic) 97.5%; ▌A. O. Barker (Republican) 2.5%
Texas 2	Martin Dies Jr.	Democratic	1930	Incumbent re-elected.	▌ ✓ Martin Dies Jr. (Democratic) 95.4%; ▌J. H. Buchanan (Republican) 4.6%; ▌John W. Conner (Liberty) 0.006%
Texas 3	Morgan G. Sanders	Democratic	1920	Incumbent re-elected.	▌ ✓ Morgan G. Sanders (Democratic); Uncontested
Texas 4	Sam Rayburn	Democratic	1912	Incumbent re-elected.	▌ ✓ Sam Rayburn (Democratic) 95.2%; ▌Floyd Harry (Republican) 4.8%
Texas 5	Hatton W. Sumners	Democratic	1914	Incumbent re-elected.	▌ ✓ Hatton W. Sumners (Democratic) 92.1%; ▌George J. McManus (Republican) 7.9%
Texas 6	Luther A. Johnson	Democratic	1922	Incumbent re-elected.	▌ ✓ Luther A. Johnson (Democratic); Uncontested
Texas 7	Clay Stone Briggs	Democratic	1918	Incumbent re-elected.	▌ ✓ Clay Stone Briggs (Democratic) 95.4%; ▌Arthur J. Long (Republican) 4.6%
Texas 8	Daniel E. Garrett	Democratic	1920	Incumbent re-elected.	▌ ✓ Daniel E. Garrett (Democratic) 92.0%; ▌William E. Lang (Republican) 8.0%; ▌J. W. McDonald (Liberty) 0.008%
Texas 9	Joseph J. Mansfield	Democratic	1916	Incumbent re-elected.	▌ ✓ Joseph J. Mansfield (Democratic) 96.7%; ▌Lewis Allen (Republican) 3.3%
Texas 10	James P. Buchanan	Democratic	1912	Incumbent re-elected.	▌ ✓ James P. Buchanan (Democratic); Uncontested
Texas 11	Oliver H. Cross	Democratic	1928	Incumbent re-elected.	▌ ✓ Oliver H. Cross (Democratic) 96.8%; ▌C. C. Baker (Republican) 3.2%
Texas 12	Fritz G. Lanham	Democratic	1919	Incumbent re-elected.	▌ ✓ Fritz G. Lanham (Democratic) 93.3%; ▌George Calvert (Republican) 6.7%
Texas 13	Guinn Williams	Democratic	1922	Incumbent retired. Democratic hold.	▌ ✓ William D. McFarlane (Democratic); Uncontested
Texas 14	Richard M. Kleberg	Democratic	1931	Incumbent re-elected.	▌ ✓ Richard M. Kleberg (Democratic) 91.5%; ▌Frank B. Vaughan (Republican) 8.5%
Texas 15	John Nance Garner	Democratic	1902	Incumbent re-elected.	▌ ✓ John Nance Garner (Democratic) 85.8%; ▌Carlos G. Watson (Republican) 14.2%
Texas 16	R. Ewing Thomason	Democratic	1930	Incumbent re-elected.	▌ ✓ R. Ewing Thomason (Democratic); Uncontested
Texas 17	Thomas L. Blanton	Democratic	1930	Incumbent re-elected.	▌ ✓ Thomas L. Blanton (Democratic); Uncontested
Texas 18	John Marvin Jones	Democratic	1916	Incumbent re-elected.	▌ ✓ John Marvin Jones (Democratic) 96.0%; ▌S. E. Fish (Republican) 4.0%
Texas at-large (3 seats)	None (new seat)			New seat. Democratic gain.	Elected on a general ticket: ▌ ✓ George B. Terrell (Democratic) 30.9%; ▌ ✓ Sterling P. Strong (Democratic) 30.9%; ▌ ✓ Joseph Weldon Bailey Jr. (Democratic) 30.8%; ▌Enoch G. Fletcher (Republican) 2.5%; ▌F. A. Blankenbeckler (Republican) 2.4%; ▌J. A. Simpson (Republican) 2.3%; ▌H. M. Shelton (Socialist) 0.10%; ▌P. L. Peterson (Socialist) 0.10%; ▌Ben O. Miller (Socialist) 0.09%; ▌P. A. Spain (Liberty) 0.007%; ▌H. G. Eastridge (Liberty) 0.007%; ▌John L. Andrews (Jacksonian) 0.003%
Texas at-large (3 seats)	None (new seat)			New seat. Democratic gain.	Elected on a general ticket: ▌ ✓ George B. Terrell (Democratic) 30.9%; ▌ ✓ Sterling P. Strong (Democratic) 30.9%; ▌ ✓ Joseph Weldon Bailey Jr. (Democratic) 30.8%; ▌Enoch G. Fletcher (Republican) 2.5%; ▌F. A. Blankenbeckler (Republican) 2.4%; ▌J. A. Simpson (Republican) 2.3%; ▌H. M. Shelton (Socialist) 0.10%; ▌P. L. Peterson (Socialist) 0.10%; ▌Ben O. Miller (Socialist) 0.09%; ▌P. A. Spain (Liberty) 0.007%; ▌H. G. Eastridge (Liberty) 0.007%; ▌John L. Andrews (Jacksonian) 0.003%
Texas at-large (3 seats)	None (new seat)			New seat. Democratic gain.	Elected on a general ticket: ▌ ✓ George B. Terrell (Democratic) 30.9%; ▌ ✓ Sterling P. Strong (Democratic) 30.9%; ▌ ✓ Joseph Weldon Bailey Jr. (Democratic) 30.8%; ▌Enoch G. Fletcher (Republican) 2.5%; ▌F. A. Blankenbeckler (Republican) 2.4%; ▌J. A. Simpson (Republican) 2.3%; ▌H. M. Shelton (Socialist) 0.10%; ▌P. L. Peterson (Socialist) 0.10%; ▌Ben O. Miller (Socialist) 0.09%; ▌P. A. Spain (Liberty) 0.007%; ▌H. G. Eastridge (Liberty) 0.007%; ▌John L. Andrews (Jacksonian) 0.003%

== Utah ==
District	Incumbent			This race	
District	Member	Party	First elected	Results	Candidates
Utah 1	Don B. Colton	Republican	1920	Incumbent lost re-election. Democratic gain.	▌ ✓ Abe Murdock (Democratic) 50.7%; ▌Don B. Colton (Republican) 47.6%; ▌?? (Socialist) 1.6%; ▌?? (Communist) 0.1%
Utah 2	Frederick C. Loofbourow	Republican	1930	Incumbent lost re-election. Democratic gain.	▌ ✓ J. W. Robinson (Democratic) 56.0%; ▌Frederick C. Loofbourow (Republican) 42.1%; ▌?? (Socialist) 1.1%; ▌?? (Communist) 0.7%

== Vermont ==
District	Incumbent			This race	
District	Member	Party	First elected	Results	Candidates
Vermont at-large	John E. Weeks; Redistricted from the 1st district	Republican	1930	Incumbent retired. Republican hold.	▌ ✓ Ernest W. Gibson (Republican) 64.4%; ▌Joseph A. McNamara (Democratic) 35.6%
Vermont at-large	Ernest W. Gibson; Redistricted from the 2nd district	Republican	1923	Incumbent re-elected.	▌ ✓ Ernest W. Gibson (Republican) 64.4%; ▌Joseph A. McNamara (Democratic) 35.6%

== Virginia ==
District	Incumbent			This race	
District	Member	Party	First elected	Results	Candidates
Virginia at-large (9 seats)	S. Otis Bland; Redistricted from the 1st district	Democratic	1918	Incumbent re-elected.	Elected on a general ticket: ▌ ✓ Clifton A. Woodrum (Democratic) 8.3%; ▌ ✓ Jack Montague (Democratic) 8.3%; ▌ ✓ S. Otis Bland (Democratic) 8.2%; ▌ ✓ Thomas G. Burch (Democratic) 8.2%; ▌ ✓ A. Willis Robertson (Democratic) 8.2%; ▌ ✓ Howard W. Smith (Democratic) 8.2%; ▌ ✓ Patrick H. Drewry (Democratic) 8.2%; ▌ ✓ Colgate Darden (Democratic) 8.2%; ▌ ✓ John W. Flannagan Jr. (Democratic) 8.1%; ▌Menalcus Lankford (Republican) 3.7%; ▌Jacob A. Garber (Republican) 3.4%; ▌Fred W. McWane (Republican) 3.3%; ▌Roland E. Chase (Republican) 3.3%; ▌George Cole Scott (Republican) 3.3%; ▌Henry A. Wise (Republican) 3.2%; ▌W. M. Brown (Independent) 1.8%; ▌Charles C. Berkeley (Independent) 1.7%; ▌R. Lindsay Gordon Jr. (Independent) 0.7%; ▌A. J. Dunning Jr. (Prohibition) 0.7%; ▌Albon James Royal (Socialist) 0.2%; ▌Winston F. Dawson (Socialist) 0.2%; ▌Herman R. Ansell (Socialist) 0.2%; ▌David G. George (Socialist) 0.2%; ▌Angie M. Norris (Socialist) 0.2%; ▌J. E. Spaulding (Republican) 0.1%; Others 0.04%; ▌Frank Lyon (Independent) 0.008%
Virginia at-large (9 seats)	Menalcus Lankford; Redistricted from the 2nd district	Republican	1928	Incumbent lost re-election. Republican loss.	
Virginia at-large (9 seats)	Jack Montague; Redistricted from the 3rd district	Democratic	1912	Incumbent re-elected.	
Virginia at-large (9 seats)	Patrick H. Drewry; Redistricted from the 4th district	Democratic	1920	Incumbent re-elected.	
Virginia at-large (9 seats)	Thomas G. Burch; Redistricted from the 5th district	Democratic	1930	Incumbent re-elected.	
Virginia at-large (9 seats)	Clifton A. Woodrum; Redistricted from the 6th district	Democratic	1922	Incumbent re-elected.	
Virginia at-large (9 seats)	John W. Fishburne; Redistricted from the 7th district	Democratic	1930	Incumbent retired. Democratic hold.	
Virginia at-large (9 seats)	Howard W. Smith; Redistricted from the 8th district	Democratic	1930	Incumbent re-elected.	
Virginia at-large (9 seats)	John W. Flannagan Jr. Redistricted from the 9th district	Democratic	1930	Incumbent re-elected.	
Virginia at-large (9 seats)	Joel West Flood; Redistricted from the 10th district	Democratic	1918	Incumbent retired. Democratic hold.	

== Washington ==
District	Incumbent			This race	
District	Member	Party	First elected	Results	Candidates
Washington 1	Ralph Horr	Republican	1930	Incumbent lost renomination. Democratic gain.	▌ ✓ Marion Zioncheck (Democratic) 55.6%; ▌John Franklin Miller (Republican) 42.9%; ▌E. E. Barnes (Liberty) 1.5%
Washington 2	Lindley H. Hadley	Republican	1914	Incumbent lost re-election. Democratic gain.	▌ ✓ Monrad Wallgren (Democratic) 56.1%; ▌Lindley H. Hadley (Republican) 35.2%; ▌Floyd Hatfield (Liberty) 7.6%; ▌W. E. Elbe (Communist) 1.0%
Washington 3	Albert Johnson	Republican	1912	Incumbent lost re-election. Democratic gain.	▌ ✓ Martin F. Smith (Democratic) 46.9%; ▌Albert Johnson (Republican) 34.4%; ▌J. T. Sullivan (Liberty) 18.7%
Washington 4	John W. Summers	Republican	1918	Incumbent lost re-election. Democratic gain.	▌ ✓ Knute Hill (Democratic) 56.3%; ▌John W. Summers (Republican) 43.7%
Washington 5	Samuel B. Hill	Democratic	1923	Incumbent re-elected.	▌ ✓ Samuel B. Hill (Democratic) 96.8%; ▌Leo Welsh (Socialist) 3.2%
Washington 6	None (new district)			New seat. Democratic gain.	▌ ✓ Wesley Lloyd (Democratic) 50.1%; ▌John T. McCutcheon (Republican) 36.8%; ▌Tom Martin (Liberty) 13.0%; ▌August Toellner (Independent) 0.1%

== West Virginia ==
District	Incumbent			This race	
District	Member	Party	First elected	Results	Candidates
West Virginia 1	Carl G. Bachmann	Republican	1924	Incumbent lost re-election. Democratic gain.	▌ ✓ Robert L. Ramsay (Democratic) 50.9%; ▌Carl G. Bachmann (Republican) 48.3%; ▌Henry L. Franklin (Independent) 0.8%
West Virginia 2	Frank L. Bowman	Republican	1924	Incumbent lost re-election. Democratic gain.	▌ ✓ Jennings Randolph (Democratic) 53.4%; ▌Frank L. Bowman (Republican) 46.2%; ▌Jesse T. Brillhart (Independent) 0.4%; ▌Emilio Garbarino (Independent) 0.02%
West Virginia 3	Lynn Hornor	Democratic	1930	Incumbent re-elected.	▌ ✓ Lynn Hornor (Democratic) 53.6%; ▌John M. Wolverton (Republican) 46.4%
West Virginia 4	Robert Lynn Hogg	Republican	1930	Incumbent lost re-election. Democratic gain.	▌ ✓ George W. Johnson (Democratic) 52.3%; ▌Robert Lynn Hogg (Republican) 47.4%; ▌J. S. Jeffrey (Independent) 0.2%
West Virginia 5	Hugh Ike Shott	Republican	1928	Incumbent lost re-election. Democratic gain.	▌ ✓ John Kee (Democratic) 52.1%; ▌Hugh Ike Shott (Republican) 47.9%
West Virginia 6	Joe L. Smith	Democratic	1928	Incumbent re-elected.	▌ ✓ Joe L. Smith (Democratic) 56.4%; ▌James O. Lakin (Republican) 43.6%

== Wisconsin ==
District	Incumbent			This race	
District	Member	Party	First elected	Results	Candidates
Wisconsin 1	Thomas Ryum Amlie	Republican	1931 (special)	Incumbent lost renomination. Republican hold.	▌ ✓ George W. Blanchard (Republican) 48.5%; ▌William D. Thompson (Democratic) 45.8%; ▌Otis J. Bouma (Social-Democratic) 4.9%; ▌Henry H. Tubbs (Prohibition) 0.4%; ▌John Sekat (Ind. Communist) 0.4%
Wisconsin 2	Charles A. Kading	Republican	1926	Incumbent lost renomination. Democratic gain.	▌ ✓ Charles W. Henney (Democratic) 56.2%; ▌John B. Gay (Republican) 42.0%; ▌Charles D. Madsen (Social-Democratic) 1.5%; ▌Georgenia J. Koppke (Prohibition) 0.3%
Wisconsin 2	John M. Nelson; Redistricted from the 3rd district	Republican	1920	Incumbent lost renomination. Republican loss.	▌ ✓ Charles W. Henney (Democratic) 56.2%; ▌John B. Gay (Republican) 42.0%; ▌Charles D. Madsen (Social-Democratic) 1.5%; ▌Georgenia J. Koppke (Prohibition) 0.3%
Wisconsin 3	Gardner R. Withrow; Redistricted from the 7th district	Republican	1920	Incumbent re-elected.	▌ ✓ Gardner R. Withrow (Republican) 60.6%; ▌John J. Boyle (Democratic) 39.4%
Wisconsin 4	John C. Schafer	Republican	1922	Incumbent lost re-election. Democratic gain.	▌ ✓ Raymond J. Cannon (Democratic) 51.0%; ▌John C. Schafer (Republican) 28.1%; ▌Walter Polakowski (Social-Democratic) 20.4%; ▌Carl Lester (Independent) 0.6%
Wisconsin 5	William H. Stafford	Republican	1928	Incumbent lost renomination. Democratic gain.	▌ ✓ Thomas O'Malley (Democratic) 43.8%; ▌Joseph A. Padway (Republican) 24.9%; ▌Herman O. Kent (Social-Democratic) 23.3%; ▌Kavanaugh C. Downey (Independent) 5.0%; ▌Emil B. Gennrich (Ind. Republican) 2.8%; ▌Emil Gardos (Independent) 0.3%
Wisconsin 6	Michael Reilly	Democratic	1930	Incumbent re-elected.	▌ ✓ Michael Reilly (Democratic) 59.1%; ▌Louis J. Fellens (Republican) 38.7%; ▌Franklin Pfeiffer (Social-Democratic) 2.2%
Wisconsin 7	Gerald J. Boileau; Redistricted from the 8th district	Republican	1930	Incumbent re-elected.	▌ ✓ Gerald J. Boileau (Republican) 51.3%; ▌Frank D. Chapman (Democratic) 48.7%
Wisconsin 8	George J. Schneider; Redistricted from the 9th district	Republican	1922	Incumbent lost re-election. Democratic gain.	▌ ✓ James Hughes (Democratic) 50.7%; ▌George J. Schneider (Republican) 49.3%
Wisconsin 9	James A. Frear; Redistricted from the 10th district	Republican	1912	Incumbent re-elected.	▌ ✓ James A. Frear (Republican) 56.9%; ▌Miles H. McNally (Democratic) 43.1%
Wisconsin 10	Hubert H. Peavey; Redistricted from the 11th district	Republican	1922	Incumbent re-elected.	▌ ✓ Hubert H. Peavey (Republican) 59.2%; ▌Peter B. Cadigan (Democratic) 39.8%; ▌Arvid Salonen (Ind. Communist) 1.1%

== Wyoming ==
District	Incumbent			This race	
District	Member	Party	First elected	Results	Candidates
Wyoming at-large	Vincent Carter	Republican	1928	Incumbent re-elected.	▌ ✓ Vincent Carter (Republican) 49.7%; ▌Paul R. Greever (Democratic) 47.7%; ▌W. W. Wolfe (Socialist) 1.6%; ▌James R. Carpenter (American) 0.8%; ▌George Morphis (Communist) 0.2%

== Non-voting delegates ==
District	Incumbent			This race	
District	Delegate	Party	First elected	Results	Candidates
Alaska Territory at-large	James Wickersham	Republican	1908; 1916 (lost, but won contest); 1918 (lost, but won contest); 1920 (retired); 1930	Incumbent lost re-election. Democratic gain.	▌ ✓ Anthony Dimond (Democratic) 71.68%; ▌James Wickersham (Republican) 28.32%
Hawaii Territory at-large
Puerto Rico at-large	José Lorenzo Pesquera	Union Party	1932 (special)	Incumbent retired. New delegate elected. Socialist gain.	▌ ✓ Santiago Iglesias Pantín (Republican Union) 54.27%; ▌Benigno Fernández García (Liberal) 44.35%; ▌Julio Medina González (Nationalist) 1.37%

== See also ==
- 1932 United States elections
  - 1932 United States Senate elections
  - 1932 United States presidential election
- 72nd United States Congress
- 73rd United States Congress
