= Howard W. Stull =

American politician

Howard William Stull (April 11, 1876 – April 22, 1949) was a Republican member of the U.S. House of Representatives from Pennsylvania.

== Early life ==
Howard W. Stull was born on a farm near Johnstown, Pennsylvania. He attended the Johnstown High School, and State Normal School (later State Teachers’ College) in Indiana, Pennsylvania. He was employed as a store clerk from 1887 to 1894 and as a railroad clerk in 1894 and 1895. He taught school at Ferndale, Pennsylvania and Dale, Pennsylvania, from 1895 to 1897. He served as post office clerk at Johnstown in 1897 and 1898 and as assistant postmaster from 1899 to 1904.

== Washington D.C. and Washington state ==
In 1905 he moved to Washington, D.C., and served as an assistant division chief in the United States Treasury Department from 1905 to 1908. He graduated from the law department of George Washington University in 1908. He was admitted to the bar the same year and commenced practice in Colville, Washington, in 1909. He was the prosecuting attorney of Stevens County, Washington, in 1911, 1912, 1915, and 1916. He was a delegate to the Republican State convention in 1916. He returned to Johnstown in 1917 and continued the practice of law.

== United States House of Representatives ==
Stull was elected as a Republican to the Seventy-second Congress to fill the vacancy caused by the resignation of J. Russell Leech. He was not a candidate for renomination in 1932. He resumed the practice of law, and died in Johnstown, Pennsylvania. Interment in Grandview Cemetery, Johnstown.

== Sources ==
- United States Congress. "Howard W. Stull (id: S001042)". Biographical Directory of the United States Congress.
- The Political Graveyard

U.S. House of Representatives
Preceded by J. Russell Leech	Member of the U.S. House of Representatives from Pennsylvania's 20th congressional district 1932–1933	Succeeded by Thomas C. Cochran
