= J. Russell Leech =

American politician

Member of the U.S. House of Representatives from Pennsylvania's 20th district
- In office March 4, 1927 – January 29, 1932
- Preceded by: Anderson H. Walters
- Succeeded by: Howard W. Stull

Personal details
- Born: November 19, 1888 Ebensburg, Pennsylvania, U.S.
- Died: February 5, 1952 (aged 63) Chevy Chase, Maryland, U.S.
- Party: Republican
- Education: Washington & Jefferson College; University of Pennsylvania Law School

James Russell Leech (November 19, 1888 – February 5, 1952) was a Republican member of the U.S. House of Representatives from Pennsylvania.

== Biography ==
J. Russell Leech was born in Ebensburg, Pennsylvania. He attended the Mercersburg Academy, in Mercersburg, Pennsylvania. He graduated from Washington & Jefferson College in Washington, Pennsylvania, in 1911, and from the law department of the University of Pennsylvania at Philadelphia, Pennsylvania in 1915. He was admitted to the bar in 1915 and commenced practice in Ebensburg. During the First World War, he was appointed as a second lieutenant and served with the Seventh Ammunition Train.

Leech was elected as a Republican to the Seventieth, Seventy-first, and Seventy-second Congresses and served until his resignation on January 29, 1932, having been appointed a member of the United States Board of Tax Appeals (now the United States Tax Court) to fill a vacancy. He was reappointed in 1934 and again in 1946, and served on this court until his death in Chevy Chase, Maryland. Interment in Lloyd Cemetery in Ebensburg.

U.S. House of Representatives
Preceded by Anderson H. Walters	Member of the U.S. House of Representatives from Pennsylvania's 20th congressional district 1927–1932	Succeeded by Howard W. Stull
