= 1922 United States House of Representatives elections =

House elections for the 68th U.S. Congress

- November 7, 1922

All 435 seats in the United States House of Representatives 218 seats needed for a majority
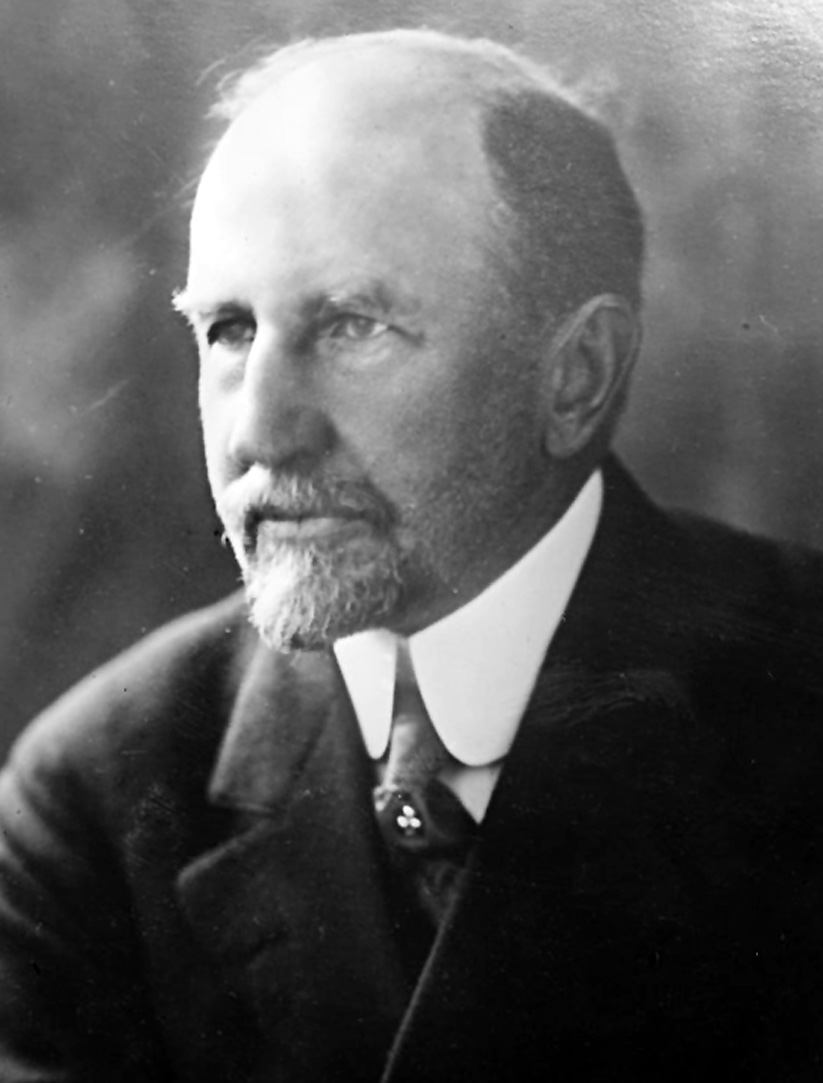

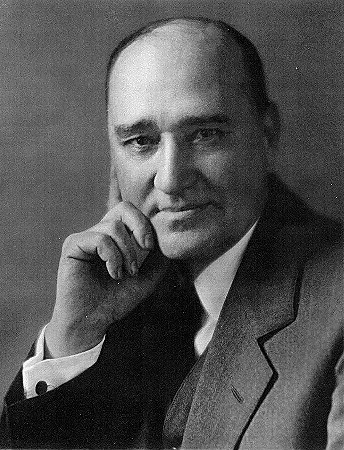
	Majority party	Minority party
Leader	Frederick Gillett	Finis J. Garrett
Party	Republican	Democratic
Leader since	May 19, 1919	March 4, 1923
Leader's seat	Massachusetts 2nd	Tennessee 9th
Last election	302 seats	131 seats
Seats won	225	207
Seat change	▼77	▲76
Popular vote	10,585,391	9,112,202
Percentage	51.86%	44.64%
Swing	▼6.96pp	▲9.26pp
	Third party	Fourth party
Party	Farmer–Labor	Socialist
Last election	0 seats	1 seat
Seats won	2	1
Seat change	▲2	Steady
Popular vote	126,989	321,916
Percentage	0.62%	1.58%
Swing	▼0.34pp	▼1.00pp
	Fifth party
Party	Independent
Last election	1 seat
Seats won	0 (Note: Milton Shreve won reelection as a Republican.)
Seat change	▼1
Speaker before election
Frederick Gillett
Republican
Elected Speaker
Frederick Gillett
Republican

The 1922 United States House of Representatives elections were elections for the United States House of Representatives to elect members to serve in the 68th United States Congress. They were held for the most part on November 7, 1922, though Maine held its on September 11. They occurred in the middle of President Warren G. Harding's term. Just as voters had expressed their distrust of Wilson in 1920, now voters had a chance to express the widespread feeling that Congress had failed to address economic problems, especially the brief but sharp Depression of 1920–1921. Most of the seats that Republicans lost had long been held by Democrats, who now returned with an even stronger base in the major cities.

The Republican Party lost a net of 77 seats to the opposition Democratic Party. The Republicans were neither unified nor well led, and they could boast of very few successes except tax cuts and higher tariffs that pleased manufacturing interest but raised consumer prices. With Senator Bob La Follette as their unofficial leader, some progressives formed a small but highly vocal group on the left of the Republican Party. Former Progressives from 1912 who had supported Theodore Roosevelt mostly refused to support LaFollette, who had been a bitter enemy of Roosevelt's. Republicans nonetheless retained a narrow majority, although splits in the party made it difficult for Harding to govern. In Minnesota, the Farmer–Labor Party, also gained several seats. The Democrats showed their greatest support in the industrial cities, where the Irish and German element returned to that party. In addition, there was growing support among the more recent immigrants, who had become more Americanized. Many ethnic families now had a veteran in their midst, and paid closer attention to national issues, such as the question of a bonus for veterans. There was also an expression of annoyance with the federal prohibition of beer and wine, and the closing of most saloons.

This was the first election after the completion of the 1920 United States census. However, the Republican-controlled Congress failed to reapportion the House membership prior to the 1922 election, and therefore the congressional districts remained based on the 1910 census for another decade. This failure to reapportion may have been politically motivated, as Republicans may have feared the effect such a reapportionment would have on their future electoral prospects.

== Overall results ==
↓
207	3	225
Democratic	(Note: There were 2 Farmer–Labor and 1 Socialist members.)	Republican

Source: Election Statistics – Office of the Clerk

State	Type	Total seats	Democratic		Republican		Others	
State	Type	Total seats	Seats	Change	Seats	Change	Seats	Change
Alabama	Districts	10	10	Steady	0	Steady	0	Steady
Arizona	At-large	1	1	Steady	0	Steady	0	Steady
Arkansas	Districts	7	7	Steady	0	Steady	0	Steady
California	Districts	11	2	Steady	9	Steady	0	Steady
Colorado	Districts	4	1	Steady	3	Steady	0	Steady
Connecticut	Districts	5	1	▲1	4	▼1	0	Steady
Delaware	At-large	1	1	▲1	0	▼1	0	Steady
Florida	Districts	4	4	Steady	0	Steady	0	Steady
Georgia	Districts	12	12	Steady	0	Steady	0	Steady
Idaho	Districts	2	0	Steady	2	Steady	0	Steady
Illinois	Districts +2 at-large	27	7	▲4	20	▼4	0	Steady
Indiana	Districts	13	5	▲5	8	▼5	0	Steady
Iowa	Districts	11	0	Steady	11	Steady	0	Steady
Kansas	Districts	8	1	▲1	7	▼1	0	Steady
Kentucky	Districts	11	8	Steady	3	Steady	0	Steady
Louisiana	Districts	8	8	Steady	0	Steady	0	Steady
Maine	Districts	4	0	Steady	4	Steady	0	Steady
Maryland	Districts	6	3	▲1	3	▼1	0	Steady
Massachusetts	Districts	16	3	▲1	13	▼1	0	Steady
Michigan	Districts	13	1	▲1	12	▼1	0	Steady
Minnesota	Districts	10	0	Steady	8	▼2	2 (Note: Farmer–Labor)	▲2
Mississippi	Districts	8	8	Steady	0	Steady	0	Steady
Missouri	Districts	16	11	▲9	5	▼9	0	Steady
Montana	Districts	2	1	▲1	1	▼1	0	Steady
Nebraska	Districts	6	3	▲3	3	▼3	0	Steady
Nevada	At-large	1	1	▲1	0	▼1	0	Steady
New Hampshire	Districts	2	1	▲1	1	▼1	0	Steady
New Jersey	Districts	12	6	▲5	6	▼5	0	Steady
New Mexico	At-large	1	1	▲1	0	▼1	0	Steady
New York	Districts	43	23	▲14	20	▼13	0	▼1 (Note: Socialist)
North Carolina	Districts	10	10	Steady	0	Steady	0	Steady
North Dakota	Districts	3	0	Steady	3	Steady	0	Steady
Ohio	Districts	22	6	▲6	16	▼6	0	Steady
Oklahoma	Districts	8	7	▲4	1	▼4	0	Steady
Oregon	Districts	3	1	▲1	2	▼1	0	Steady
Pennsylvania	Districts	36	6	▲5	30	▼5	0	Steady
Rhode Island	Districts	3	1	▲1	2	▼1	0	Steady
South Carolina	Districts	7	7	Steady	0	Steady	0	Steady
South Dakota	Districts	3	0	Steady	3	Steady	0	Steady
Tennessee	Districts	10	8	▲3	2	▼3	0	Steady
Texas	Districts	18	17	Steady	1	Steady	0	Steady
Utah	Districts	2	0	Steady	2	Steady	0	Steady
Vermont	Districts	2	0	Steady	2	Steady	0	Steady
Virginia	Districts	10	10	▲1	0	▼1	0	Steady
Washington	Districts	5	0	Steady	5	Steady	0	Steady
West Virginia	Districts	6	4	▲4	2	▼4	0	Steady
Wisconsin	Districts	11	0	Steady	10	▼1	1 (Note: Socialist)	▲1
Wyoming	At-large	1	0	Steady	1	Steady	0	Steady
Total		435	207 47.6%	▲75	225 51.7%	▼77	3 0.7%	▲2

House seats
Democratic	47.59%
Farmer–Labor	0.46%
Republican	51.72%
Socialist	0.23%

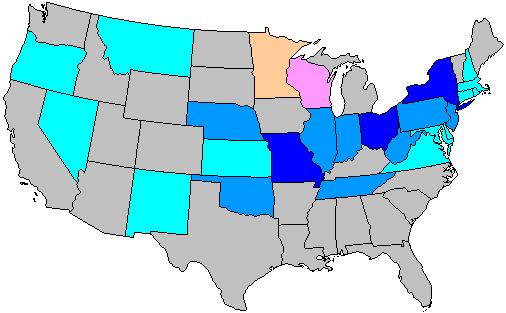
Net gains per state: 6+ Democratic gain / / 6+ Republican gain; 3-5 Democratic gain / / 3-5 Republican gain; 1-2 Democratic gain / 1-2 Socialist gain / 1-2 Republican gain; / 1-2 Farmer–Labor gain; / no net change

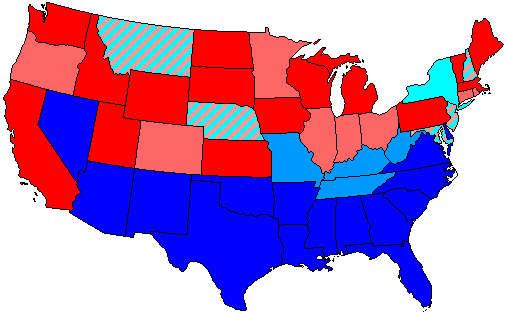
House seats by party holding plurality in state: 80+% Democratic / 80+% Republican; 60+% to 80% Democratic / 60+% to 80% Republican; Up to 60% Democratic / Up to 60% Republican; Stripes: 50/50 split

== Special elections ==
District	Incumbent			This race	
District	Member	Party	First elected	Results	Candidates
Maine 3	John A. Peters	Republican	1913 (special)	Incumbent resigned when appointed to U.S. District Court for the District of Maine. New member elected March 20, 1922. Republican hold.	▌ ✓ John E. Nelson (Republican) 63.29%; ▌Ernest K. McLean (Democratic) 36.71%
Virginia 10	Henry D. Flood	Democratic	1900	Incumbent died December 8, 1921. New member elected March 21, 1922. Democratic hold.	▌ ✓ Henry St. George Tucker III (Democratic); Uncontested
New York 37	Alanson B. Houghton	Republican	1918	Incumbent resigned to become United States Ambassador to Germany. New member elected April 11, 1922. Republican hold.	▌ ✓ Lewis Henry (Republican) 53.55%; ▌Frank Irvine (Democratic) 45.64%; ▌Israel Putnam (Socialist) 0.81%
Texas 13	Lucian W. Parrish	Democratic	1918	Incumbent died March 27, 1922. New member elected May 22, 1922. Democratic hold.	▌ ✓ Guinn Williams (Democratic) 49.76%; ▌ S. A. Morgan (Democratic) 29.31%; ▌ Annie W. Blanton (Democratic) 13.09%; ▌ Orville Bullington (Independent) 7.68%; ▌ W. S. Moore (Independent) 0.15%
California 6	John A. Elston	Republican	1914	Incumbent died December 15, 1921. New member elected November 7, 1922. Republican hold. Winner also elected to the next term.	▌ ✓ James H. MacLafferty (Republican) 68.39%; ▌Hugh W. Brunk (Democratic) 31.61%
Illinois at-large	William E. Mason	Republican	1916	Incumbent died June 16, 1921. New member elected November 7, 1922 to finish her father's term. Republican hold. Winner was not elected to the next term.	▌ ✓ Winnifred Huck (Republican) 52.62%; ▌Allen D. Albert (Democratic) 43.19%; ▌Fred O. Hartline (Socialist) 2.20%; Frank Donovan (Farmer–Labor) 2.00%
Massachusetts 16	Joseph Walsh	Republican	1914	Incumbent resigned when appointed to Massachusetts Superior Court. New member elected November 7, 1922. Republican hold. Winner also elected to the next term.	▌ ✓ Charles L. Gifford (Republican); Uncontested
Nebraska 1	C. Frank Reavis	Republican	1914	Incumbent resigned to become special assistant to the U.S. Attorney General. New member elected November 7, 1922. Republican hold. Winner was not a candidate for the next term.	▌ ✓ Roy H. Thorpe (Republican) 54.02%; ▌W. C. Parriott (Democratic) 45.98%
Nebraska 6	Moses Kinkaid	Republican	1902	Incumbent died July 6, 1922. New member elected November 7, 1922. Republican hold. Winner was not elected to the next term.	▌ ✓ Augustin Reed Humphrey (Republican) 50.51%; ▌Will M. Maupin (Democratic) 40.77%; ▌B. J. Minort (Prohibition) 8.72%
North Carolina 3	Samuel M. Brinson	Democratic	1918	Incumbent died April 13, 1922. New member elected November 7, 1922. Democratic hold. Winner also elected to the next term.	▌ ✓ Charles L. Abernethy (Democratic); Uncontested
Tennessee 7	Lemuel P. Padgett	Democratic	1900	Incumbent died August 2, 1922. New member elected November 7, 1922. Democratic hold. Winner was not elected to the next term.	▌ ✓ Clarence W. Turner (Democratic) 86.28%; ▌S. W. Williams (Republican) 13.72%

== Alabama ==
District	Incumbent			This race	
District	Member	Party	First elected	Results	Candidates
Alabama 1	John McDuffie	Democratic	1918	Incumbent re-elected.	▌ ✓ John McDuffie (Democratic); Uncontested
Alabama 2	John R. Tyson	Democratic	1920	Incumbent re-elected.	▌ ✓ John R. Tyson (Democratic); Uncontested
Alabama 3	Henry B. Steagall	Democratic	1914	Incumbent re-elected.	▌ ✓ Henry B. Steagall (Democratic); Uncontested
Alabama 4	Lamar Jeffers	Democratic	1921 (special)	Incumbent re-elected.	▌ ✓ Lamar Jeffers (Democratic); Uncontested
Alabama 5	William B. Bowling	Democratic	1920	Incumbent re-elected.	▌ ✓ William B. Bowling (Democratic); Uncontested
Alabama 6	William B. Oliver	Democratic	1914	Incumbent re-elected.	▌ ✓ William B. Oliver (Democratic); Uncontested
Alabama 7	Lilius Bratton Rainey	Democratic	1918	Incumbent retired. Democratic hold.	▌ ✓ Miles C. Allgood (Democratic); Uncontested
Alabama 8	Edward B. Almon	Democratic	1914	Incumbent re-elected.	▌ ✓ Edward B. Almon (Democratic); Uncontested
Alabama 9	George Huddleston	Democratic	1914	Incumbent re-elected.	▌ ✓ George Huddleston (Democratic); Uncontested
Alabama 10	William B. Bankhead	Democratic	1916	Incumbent re-elected.	▌ ✓ William B. Bankhead (Democratic); Uncontested

== Arizona ==
Results by county Hayden: 60–70% 70–80% 80–90%

District	Incumbent			This race	
District	Member	Party	First elected	Results	Candidates
Arizona at-large	Carl Hayden	Democratic	1912 (new state)	Incumbent re-elected.	▌ ✓ Carl Hayden (Democratic) 75.6%; ▌Emma M. Guild (Republican) 24.4%

== Arkansas ==
District	Incumbent			This race	
District	Member	Party	First elected	Results	Candidates
Arkansas 1	William J. Driver	Democratic	1920	Incumbent re-elected.	▌ ✓ William J. Driver (Democratic); Uncontested
Arkansas 2	William A. Oldfield	Democratic	1908	Incumbent re-elected.	▌ ✓ William A. Oldfield (Democratic); Uncontested
Arkansas 3	John N. Tillman	Democratic	1914	Incumbent re-elected.	▌ ✓ John N. Tillman (Democratic); Uncontested
Arkansas 4	Otis Wingo	Democratic	1912	Incumbent re-elected.	▌ ✓ Otis Wingo (Democratic); Uncontested
Arkansas 5	Henderson M. Jacoway	Democratic	1910	Incumbent retired. Democratic hold.	▌ ✓ Heartsill Ragon (Democratic); Uncontested
Arkansas 6	Chester W. Taylor	Democratic	1921 (special)	Incumbent retired. Democratic hold.	▌ ✓ Lewis E. Sawyer (Democratic); Uncontested
Arkansas 7	Tilman B. Parks	Democratic	1920	Incumbent re-elected.	▌ ✓ Tilman B. Parks (Democratic); Uncontested

== California ==
District	Incumbent			This race	
District	Member	Party	First elected	Results	Candidates
California 1	Clarence F. Lea	Democratic	1916	Incumbent re-elected.	▌ ✓ Clarence F. Lea (Democratic); Uncontested
California 2	John E. Raker	Democratic	1910	Incumbent re-elected.	▌ ✓ John E. Raker (Democratic); Uncontested
California 3	Charles F. Curry	Republican	1912	Incumbent re-elected.	▌ ✓ Charles F. Curry (Republican) 91.6%; ▌Marcus H. Steely (Socialist) 8.4%
California 4	Julius Kahn	Republican	1898	Incumbent re-elected.	▌ ✓ Julius Kahn (Republican) 83%; ▌Hugo Ernst (Socialist) 17%
California 5	John I. Nolan	Republican	1912	Incumbent re-elected.	▌ ✓ John I. Nolan (Republican); Uncontested
California 6	James H. MacLafferty	Republican	1922	Incumbent re-elected.	▌ ✓ James H. MacLafferty (Republican) 66.4%; ▌Hugh W. Brunk (Democratic) 25.2%; ▌Elvina S. Beals (Socialist) 8.4%
California 7	Henry E. Barbour	Republican	1918	Incumbent re-elected.	▌ ✓ Henry E. Barbour (Republican); Uncontested
California 8	Arthur M. Free	Republican	1920	Incumbent re-elected.	▌ ✓ Arthur M. Free (Republican); Uncontested
California 9	Walter F. Lineberger	Republican	1920	Incumbent re-elected.	▌ ✓ Walter F. Lineberger (Republican) 59.1%; ▌Charles H. Randall (D-Proh.) 40.9%
California 10	Henry Z. Osborne	Republican	1916	Incumbent re-elected. Incumbent died February 8, 1923, before the new Congress, leading to a special election.	▌ ✓ Henry Z. Osborne (Republican); Uncontested
California 11	Phil Swing	Republican	1920	Incumbent re-elected.	▌ ✓ Phil Swing (Republican) 91.4%; ▌George Bauer (Socialist) 8.6%

== Colorado ==
District	Incumbent			This race	
District	Member	Party	First elected	Results	Candidates
Colorado 1	William N. Vaile	Republican	1918	Incumbent re-elected.	▌ ✓ William N. Vaile (Republican) 55.5%; ▌Benjamin Hilliard (Democratic) 42.9%; ▌Hattie K. Howard (Farmer–Labor) 1.6%
Colorado 2	Charles B. Timberlake	Republican	1914	Incumbent re-elected.	▌ ✓ Charles B. Timberlake (Republican) 57.3%; ▌Charles M. Worth (Democratic) 42.7%
Colorado 3	Guy U. Hardy	Republican	1918	Incumbent re-elected.	▌ ✓ Guy U. Hardy (Republican) 52.4%; ▌Chester B. Horn (Democratic) 47.6%
Colorado 4	Edward T. Taylor	Democratic	1908	Incumbent re-elected.	▌ ✓ Edward T. Taylor (Democratic) 64.3%; ▌Merle D. Vincent (Republican) 35.7%

== Connecticut ==
District	Incumbent			This race	
District	Member	Party	First elected	Results	Candidates
Connecticut 1	E. Hart Fenn	Republican	1920	Incumbent re-elected.	▌ ✓ E. Hart Fenn (Republican) 52.2%; ▌Joseph S. Dutton (Democratic) 45.6%; ▌Henry Vanderburgh (Socialist Labor) 2.2%
Connecticut 2	Richard P. Freeman	Republican	1914	Incumbent re-elected.	▌ ✓ Richard P. Freeman (Republican) 55.4%; ▌Raymond J. Jodoin (Democratic) 43.5%; ▌Albert Boardman (Socialist Labor) 1.2%
Connecticut 3	John Q. Tilson	Republican	1914	Incumbent re-elected.	▌ ✓ John Q. Tilson (Republican) 52.3%; ▌Stephen Whitney (Democratic) 45.7%; ▌? Williams (Socialist Labor) 2.0%
Connecticut 4	Schuyler Merritt	Republican	1916	Incumbent re-elected.	▌ ✓ Schuyler Merritt (Republican) 53.9%; ▌Archibald McNeil (Democratic) 44.3%; ▌? Moffatt (Socialist Labor) 1.8%
Connecticut 5	James P. Glynn	Republican	1914	Incumbent lost re-election. Democratic gain.	▌ ✓ Patrick B. O'Sullivan (Democratic) 49.7%; ▌James P. Glynn (Republican) 49.1%; ▌John P. McCarthy (Socialist Labor) 1.2%

== Delaware ==
District	Incumbent			This race	
District	Member	Party	First elected	Results	Candidates
Delaware at-large	Caleb R. Layton	Republican	1918	Incumbent lost re-election. Democratic gain.	▌ ✓ William H. Boyce (Democratic) 53.9%; ▌Caleb R. Layton (Republican) 44.9%; ▌Frank A. Houck (Independent) 1.3%

== Florida ==
District	Incumbent			This race	
District	Member	Party	First elected	Results	Candidates
Florida 1	Herbert J. Drane	Democratic	1916	Incumbent re-elected.	▌ ✓ Herbert J. Drane (Democratic) 82.9%; ▌William M. Gober (Republican) 17.1%
Florida 2	Frank Clark	Democratic	1904	Incumbent re-elected.	▌ ✓ Frank Clark (Democratic); Uncontested
Florida 3	John H. Smithwick	Democratic	1918	Incumbent re-elected.	▌ ✓ John H. Smithwick (Democratic); Uncontested
Florida 4	William J. Sears	Democratic	1914	Incumbent re-elected.	▌ ✓ William J. Sears (Democratic) 82.3%; ▌Howard W. McCay (Republican) 17.7%

== Georgia ==
District	Incumbent			This race	
District	Member	Party	First elected	Results	Candidates
Georgia 1	James W. Overstreet	Democratic	1916	Incumbent lost renomination. Democratic hold.	▌ ✓ R. Lee Moore (Democratic) 90.0%; ▌D. H. Clarke (Republican) 6.9%; ▌P. M. Anderson (Republican) 3.2%
Georgia 2	Frank Park	Democratic	1912	Incumbent re-elected.	▌ ✓ Frank Park (Democratic); Uncontested
Georgia 3	Charles R. Crisp	Democratic	1912	Incumbent re-elected.	▌ ✓ Charles R. Crisp (Democratic); Uncontested
Georgia 4	William C. Wright	Democratic	1918	Incumbent re-elected.	▌ ✓ William C. Wright (Democratic); Uncontested
Georgia 5	William D. Upshaw	Democratic	1918	Incumbent re-elected.	▌ ✓ William D. Upshaw (Democratic) 95.0%; ▌Max H. Wilensky (Nonpartisan League) 5.0%
Georgia 6	James W. Wise	Democratic	1914	Incumbent re-elected.	▌ ✓ James W. Wise (Democratic); Uncontested
Georgia 7	Gordon Lee	Democratic	1904	Incumbent re-elected.	▌ ✓ Gordon Lee (Democratic); Uncontested
Georgia 8	Charles H. Brand	Democratic	1916	Incumbent re-elected.	▌ ✓ Charles H. Brand (Democratic); Uncontested
Georgia 9	Thomas M. Bell	Democratic	1904	Incumbent re-elected.	▌ ✓ Thomas M. Bell (Democratic) 94.6%; ▌G. D. Brinkman (Republican) 4.6%; ▌John Gaston (Republican) 0.9%
Georgia 10	Carl Vinson	Democratic	1914	Incumbent re-elected.	▌ ✓ Carl Vinson (Democratic); Uncontested
Georgia 11	William C. Lankford	Democratic	1918	Incumbent re-elected.	▌ ✓ William C. Lankford (Democratic); Uncontested
Georgia 12	William W. Larsen	Democratic	1916	Incumbent re-elected.	▌ ✓ William W. Larsen (Democratic); Uncontested

== Idaho ==
District	Incumbent			This race	
District	Member	Party	First elected	Results	Candidates
Idaho 1	Burton L. French	Republican	1916	Incumbent re-elected.	▌ ✓ Burton L. French (Republican) 46.8%; ▌George Waters (Democratic) 26.7%; ▌W. W. Deal (Progressive) 26.5%
Idaho 2	Addison T. Smith	Republican	1912	Incumbent re-elected.	▌ ✓ Addison T. Smith (Republican) 47.8%; ▌W. P. Whitaker (Democratic) 28.6%; ▌Dow Dunning (Progressive) 23.7%

== Illinois ==
District	Incumbent			This race	
District	Member	Party	First elected	Results	Candidates
Illinois 1	Martin B. Madden	Republican	1904	Incumbent re-elected.	▌ ✓ Martin B. Madden (Republican) 59.1%; ▌George Mayer (Democratic) 39.6%; Others: ▌Charles Hallbeck (Socialist Labor) 1.1%; ▌J. H. Kennedy (Farmer–Labor) 0.3%
Illinois 2	James R. Mann	Republican	1896	Incumbent re-elected.	▌ ✓ James R. Mann (Republican) 58.2%; ▌Adam F. Bloch (Democratic) 38.2%; ▌Charles V. Johnson (Socialist Labor) 3.0%; ▌William Emerson (Farmer–Labor) 0.6%
Illinois 3	Elliott W. Sproul	Republican	1920	Incumbent re-elected.	▌ ✓ Elliott W. Sproul (Republican) 48.8%; ▌Thomas M. Crane (Democratic) 47.7%; ▌Kellam Foster (Socialist Labor) 2.6%; ▌George W. Stone (Farmer–Labor) 1.0%
Illinois 4	John W. Rainey	Democratic	1918	Incumbent re-elected.	▌ ✓ John W. Rainey (Democratic) 69.2%; ▌Henry G. Dobler (Republican) 28.4%; ▌John F. Krause (Socialist Labor) 2.4%
Illinois 5	Adolph J. Sabath	Democratic	1906	Incumbent re-elected.	▌ ✓ Adolph J. Sabath (Democratic) 66.5%; ▌Jacob Gartenstein (Republican) 29.4%; ▌Michael Sambrowski (Socialist Labor) 3.7%; ▌William J. Riordan (Farmer–Labor) 0.4%
Illinois 6	John J. Gorman	Republican	1920	Incumbent lost re-election. Democratic gain.	▌ ✓ James R. Buckley (Democratic) 48.2%; ▌John J. Gorman (Republican) 48.2%; ▌William F. Kruse (Socialist Labor) 3.6%
Illinois 7	M. Alfred Michaelson	Republican	1920	Incumbent re-elected.	▌ ✓ M. Alfred Michaelson (Republican) 49.8%; ▌Frank M. Padden (Democratic) 43.8%; ▌John M. Collins (Socialist Labor) 5.2%; ▌Daniel J. Gilfoy (Farmer–Labor) 1.2%
Illinois 8	Stanley H. Kunz	Democratic	1920	Incumbent re-elected.	▌ ✓ Stanley H. Kunz (Democratic) 65.3%; ▌Fred S. DeCola (Republican) 32.4%; Others: ▌Henry C. Stockbridge (Socialist Labor) 1.9%; ▌James M. Cahill (Farmer–Labor) 0.3%
Illinois 9	Frederick A. Britten	Republican	1912	Incumbent re-elected.	▌ ✓ Frederick A. Britten (Republican) 60.0%; ▌James A. Prendergast (Democratic) 37.3%; ▌Evar Anderson (Socialist Labor) 2.7%
Illinois 10	Carl R. Chindblom	Republican	1918	Incumbent re-elected.	▌ ✓ Carl R. Chindblom (Republican) 61.5%; ▌Bernard M. Wiedinger (Democratic) 35.1%; ▌Michael J. Scanlan (Socialist Labor) 2.6%; ▌F. C. Dahms (Farmer–Labor) 0.8%
Illinois 11	Ira C. Copley	Republican	1910	Incumbent retired. Republican hold.	▌ ✓ Frank R. Reid (Republican) 68.8%; ▌Edward J. O'Beirne (Democratic) 29.7%; ▌Frank L. Raymond (Socialist Labor) 1.5%
Illinois 12	Charles Eugene Fuller	Republican	1914	Incumbent re-elected.	▌ ✓ Charles Eugene Fuller (Republican) 77.6%; ▌John A. Dowdall (Democratic) 19.4%; ▌Fred N. Hale (Socialist Labor) 3.0%
Illinois 13	John C. McKenzie	Republican	1910	Incumbent re-elected.	▌ ✓ John C. McKenzie (Republican) 70.0%; ▌William G. Curtiss (Democratic) 28.7%; ▌Xavier F. Gehant (Socialist Labor) 1.3%
Illinois 14	William J. Graham	Republican	1916	Incumbent re-elected.	▌ ✓ William J. Graham (Republican) 59.9%; ▌L. S. Mayer (Democratic) 36.9%; Others: ▌John A. Nelson (Socialist Labor) 1.7%; ▌William C. Mardis (Farmer–Labor) 1.5%
Illinois 15	Edward John King	Republican	1914	Incumbent re-elected.	▌ ✓ Edward John King (Republican) 60.1%; ▌Charles C. Craig (Democratic) 38.3%; ▌Emil P. Nelson (Socialist Labor) 1.6%
Illinois 16	Clifford C. Ireland	Republican	1916	Incumbent lost renomination. Republican hold.	▌ ✓ William E. Hull (Republican) 55.2%; ▌Jesse Black Jr. (Democratic) 42.6%; Others: ▌James Lofthouse (Socialist Labor) 1.4%; ▌W. T. Smith (Farmer–Labor) 0.9%
Illinois 17	Frank H. Funk	Republican	1920	Incumbent re-elected.	▌ ✓ Frank H. Funk (Republican) 55.7%; ▌Frank Gillespie (Democratic) 43.5%; ▌John E. Abbott (Socialist Labor) 0.8%
Illinois 18	Joseph Gurney Cannon	Republican	1914	Incumbent retired. Republican hold.	▌ ✓ William P. Holaday (Republican) 52.8%; ▌Andrew B. Dennis (Democratic) 44.4%; ▌C. L. Mulhall (Farmer–Labor) 2.0%; ▌James P. Miller (Socialist Labor) 0.8%
Illinois 19	Allen F. Moore	Republican	1920	Incumbent re-elected.	▌ ✓ Allen F. Moore (Republican) 54.3%; ▌Raymond D. Meeker (Democratic) 44.6%; ▌John R. Heffner (Socialist Labor) 1.0%
Illinois 20	Guy L. Shaw	Republican	1920	Incumbent lost re-election. Democratic gain.	▌ ✓ Henry T. Rainey (Democratic) 54.2%; ▌Guy L. Shaw (Republican) 45.8%
Illinois 21	Loren E. Wheeler	Republican	1914	Incumbent lost re-election. Democratic gain.	▌ ✓ J. Earl Major (Democratic) 49.3%; ▌Loren E. Wheeler (Republican) 43.3%; ▌Duncan McDonald (Farmer–Labor) 5.8%; ▌Herman Rahm (Socialist Labor) 1.6%
Illinois 22	William A. Rodenberg	Republican	1914	Incumbent retired. Republican hold.	▌ ✓ Edward E. Miller (Republican) 47.6%; ▌Edward E. Campbell (Democratic) 43.9%; ▌D. L. Thomas (Farmer–Labor) 6.9%; ▌Earl G. Galloway (Socialist Labor) 1.6%
Illinois 23	Edwin B. Brooks	Republican	1918	Incumbent lost re-election. Democratic gain.	▌ ✓ William W. Arnold (Democratic) 52.5%; ▌Edwin B. Brooks (Republican) 46.7%; ▌Fred A. Cawley (Socialist Labor) 0.8%
Illinois 24	Thomas Sutler Williams	Republican	1914	Incumbent re-elected.	▌ ✓ Thomas Sutler Williams (Republican) 50.8%; ▌Dempsey T. Woodard (Democratic) 49.2%
Illinois 25	Edward E. Denison	Republican	1914	Incumbent re-elected.	▌ ✓ Edward E. Denison (Republican) 54.4%; ▌A. S. Caldwell (Democratic) 41.2%; ▌James McCollum (Farmer–Labor) 2.8%; ▌Norman M. Harris (Socialist Labor) 1.7%
Illinois at-large	Richard Yates Jr.	Republican	1918	Incumbent re-elected.	▌ ✓ Richard Yates Jr. (Republican) 27.5%; ▌ ✓ Henry R. Rathbone (Republican) 28.4%; ▌Simon J. Gorman (Democratic) 20.1%; ▌William Murphy (Democratic) 19.9%; Others: ▌Fred W. Wenschoff (Socialist Labor) 1.1%; ▌Andrew Lafin (Socialist Labor) 1.1%; ▌Edward Ellis Carr (Farmer–Labor) 1.0%; ▌Henry W. Olinger (Farmer–Labor) 0.9%
Illinois at-large	Winnifred M. Huck	Republican	1922 (special)	Incumbent lost renomination. Republican hold.	▌ ✓ Richard Yates Jr. (Republican) 27.5%; ▌ ✓ Henry R. Rathbone (Republican) 28.4%; ▌Simon J. Gorman (Democratic) 20.1%; ▌William Murphy (Democratic) 19.9%; Others: ▌Fred W. Wenschoff (Socialist Labor) 1.1%; ▌Andrew Lafin (Socialist Labor) 1.1%; ▌Edward Ellis Carr (Farmer–Labor) 1.0%; ▌Henry W. Olinger (Farmer–Labor) 0.9%

== Indiana ==
District	Incumbent			This race	
District	Member	Party	First elected	Results	Candidates
Indiana 1	Oscar R. Luhring	Republican	1918	Incumbent lost re-election. Democratic gain.	▌ ✓ William E. Wilson (Democratic) 54.4%; ▌Oscar R. Luhring (Republican) 45.6%
Indiana 2	Oscar E. Bland	Republican	1916	Incumbent lost re-election. Democratic gain.	▌ ✓ Arthur H. Greenwood (Democratic) 50.5%; ▌Oscar E. Bland (Republican) 49.5%
Indiana 3	James W. Dunbar	Republican	1918	Incumbent retired. Democratic gain.	▌ ✓ Frank Gardner (Democratic) 53.8%; ▌Samuel A. Lambdin (Republican) 46.2%
Indiana 4	John S. Benham	Republican	1918	Incumbent lost re-election. Democratic gain.	▌ ✓ Harry C. Canfield (Democratic) 51.1%; ▌John S. Benham (Republican) 48.9%
Indiana 5	Everett Sanders	Republican	1916	Incumbent re-elected.	▌ ✓ Everett Sanders (Republican) 50.7%; ▌Charles H. Bidaman (Democratic) 49.3%
Indiana 6	Richard N. Elliott	Republican	1918	Incumbent re-elected.	▌ ✓ Richard N. Elliott (Republican) 51.6%; ▌James A. Clifton (Democratic) 48.4%
Indiana 7	Merrill Moores	Republican	1914	Incumbent re-elected.	▌ ✓ Merrill Moores (Republican) 54.7%; ▌Joseph P. Turk (Democratic) 45.3%
Indiana 8	Albert H. Vestal	Republican	1916	Incumbent re-elected.	▌ ✓ Albert H. Vestal (Republican) 52.6%; ▌John W. Tyndall (Democratic) 47.4%
Indiana 9	Fred S. Purnell	Republican	1916	Incumbent re-elected.	▌ ✓ Fred S. Purnell (Republican) 52.7%; ▌George Lee Moffett (Democratic) 47.3%
Indiana 10	William R. Wood	Republican	1914	Incumbent re-elected.	▌ ✓ William R. Wood (Republican) 59.7%; ▌William F. Spencer (Democratic) 40.3%
Indiana 11	Milton Kraus	Republican	1916	Incumbent lost re-election. Democratic gain.	▌ ✓ Samuel E. Cook (Democratic) 53.6%; ▌Milton Kraus (Republican) 46.4%
Indiana 12	Louis W. Fairfield	Republican	1916	Incumbent re-elected.	▌ ✓ Louis W. Fairfield (Republican) 51.1%; ▌Charles W. Branstrator (Democratic) 48.9%
Indiana 13	Andrew J. Hickey	Republican	1918	Incumbent re-elected.	▌ ✓ Andrew J. Hickey (Republican) 53.7%; ▌Esther K. O'Keeffe (Democratic) 46.3%

== Iowa ==
District	Incumbent			This race	
District	Member	Party	First elected	Results	Candidates
Iowa 1	William F. Kopp	Republican	1920	Incumbent re-elected.	▌ ✓ William F. Kopp (Republican) 65.0%; ▌John M. Lindley (Democratic) 34.3%; ▌Arthur W. Saarman (Independent) 0.7%
Iowa 2	Harry E. Hull	Republican	1914	Incumbent re-elected.	▌ ✓ Harry E. Hull (Republican) 51.4%; ▌Wayne G. Cook (Democratic) 47.9%; ▌William E. McIntosh (Independent) 0.7%
Iowa 3	Burton E. Sweet	Republican	1914	Incumbent retired to run for U.S. senator. Republican hold.	▌ ✓ Thomas J. B. Robinson (Republican) 57.6%; ▌Fred P. Hageman (Democratic) 40.6%; ▌L. E. Eikelburg (Independent) 1.8%
Iowa 4	Gilbert N. Haugen	Republican	1898	Incumbent re-elected.	▌ ✓ Gilbert N. Haugen (Republican) 57.1%; ▌A. M. Schanke (Democratic) 42.9%
Iowa 5	Cyrenus Cole	Republican	1921 (special)	Incumbent re-elected.	▌ ✓ Cyrenus Cole (Republican) 68.0%; ▌G. A. Smith (Democratic) 32.0%
Iowa 6	C. William Ramseyer	Republican	1914	Incumbent re-elected.	▌ ✓ C. William Ramseyer (Republican) 61.9%; ▌James E. Craven (Democratic) 37.7%; ▌L. D. Reid (Independent) 0.5%
Iowa 7	Cassius C. Dowell	Republican	1914	Incumbent re-elected.	▌ ✓ Cassius C. Dowell (Republican) 62.3%; ▌Winfred E. Robb (Democratic) 36.6%; ▌Charles Gay (Independent) 1.1%
Iowa 8	Horace M. Towner	Republican	1910	Incumbent re-elected.	▌ ✓ Horace M. Towner (Republican) 56.5%; ▌J. P. Daughton (Democratic) 43.5%
Iowa 9	William R. Green	Republican	1910	Incumbent re-elected.	▌ ✓ William R. Green (Republican) 61.7%; ▌Paul W. Richards (Democratic) 38.3%
Iowa 10	Lester J. Dickinson	Republican	1918	Incumbent re-elected.	▌ ✓ Lester J. Dickinson (Republican) 71.1%; ▌Jett W. Douglas (Democratic) 28.9%
Iowa 11	William D. Boies	Republican	1918	Incumbent re-elected.	▌ ✓ William D. Boies (Republican) 60.0%; ▌Guy Gillette (Democratic) 40.0%

== Kansas ==
District	Incumbent			This race	
District	Member	Party	First elected	Results	Candidates
Kansas 1	Daniel R. Anthony Jr.	Republican	1907 (special)	Incumbent re-elected.	▌ ✓ Daniel R. Anthony Jr. (Republican) 63.7%; ▌Frank Gragg (Democratic) 36.3%
Kansas 2	Edward C. Little	Republican	1916	Incumbent re-elected.	▌ ✓ Edward C. Little (Republican) 54.4%; ▌William H. Thompson (Democratic) 45.6%
Kansas 3	Philip P. Campbell	Republican	1902	Incumbent lost renomination. Republican hold.	▌ ✓ William H. Sproul (Republican) 49.0%; ▌Charles Stephens (Democratic) 48.4%; ▌George W. Snyder (Socialist Labor) 2.6%
Kansas 4	Homer Hoch	Republican	1918	Incumbent re-elected.	▌ ✓ Homer Hoch (Republican) 62.0%; ▌Walter W. Austin (Democratic) 36.2%; ▌Thomas H. McGill (Socialist Labor) 1.9%
Kansas 5	James G. Strong	Republican	1918	Incumbent re-elected.	▌ ✓ James G. Strong (Republican) 56.3%; ▌Clarence E. Hatfield (Democratic) 43.7%
Kansas 6	Hays B. White	Republican	1918	Incumbent re-elected.	▌ ✓ Hays B. White (Republican) 54.1%; ▌F. W. Boyd (Democratic) 43.1%; ▌B. B. Brethauer (Socialist Labor) 2.8%
Kansas 7	Jasper N. Tincher	Republican	1918	Incumbent re-elected.	▌ ✓ Jasper N. Tincher (Republican) 58.3%; ▌A. S. Allphin (Democratic) 39.5%; ▌Edward E. Colglazier (Socialist Labor) 2.2%
Kansas 8	Richard E. Bird	Republican	1920	Incumbent lost re-election. Democratic gain.	▌ ✓ William Augustus Ayres (Democratic) 62.3%; ▌Richard E. Bird (Republican) 37.7%

== Kentucky ==
District	Incumbent			This race	
District	Member	Party	First elected	Results	Candidates
Kentucky 1	Alben W. Barkley	Democratic	1912	Incumbent re-elected.	▌ ✓ Alben W. Barkley (Democratic) 68.3%; ▌F. M. McCain (Republican) 31.7%
Kentucky 2	David Hayes Kincheloe	Democratic	1914	Incumbent re-elected.	▌ ✓ David Hayes Kincheloe (Democratic) 64.2%; ▌George W. Jolly (Republican) 35.8%
Kentucky 3	Robert Y. Thomas Jr.	Democratic	1908	Incumbent re-elected.	▌ ✓ Robert Y. Thomas Jr. (Democratic) 59.0%; ▌W. O. Moats (Republican) 41.0%
Kentucky 4	Ben Johnson	Democratic	1906	Incumbent re-elected.	▌ ✓ Ben Johnson (Democratic) 93.1%; ▌P. N. Woodruff (Republican) 6.9%
Kentucky 5	Charles F. Ogden	Republican	1918	Incumbent retired. Republican hold.	▌ ✓ Maurice Thatcher (Republican) 49.1%; ▌Kendrick R. Lewid (Democratic) 44.4%; ▌H. F. Young (Farmer–Labor) 6.5%
Kentucky 6	Arthur B. Rouse	Democratic	1910	Incumbent re-elected.	▌ ✓ Arthur B. Rouse (Democratic) 63.9%; ▌Leo E. Keller (Nonpartisan League) 32.4%; ▌M. A. Brinkman (Socialist Labor) 3.6%
Kentucky 7	J. Campbell Cantrill	Democratic	1908	Incumbent re-elected.	▌ ✓ J. Campbell Cantrill (Democratic); Uncontested
Kentucky 8	Ralph W. E. Gilbert	Democratic	1920	Incumbent re-elected.	▌ ✓ Ralph W. E. Gilbert (Democratic) 57.4%; ▌D. H. Kincaid (Republican) 42.6%
Kentucky 9	William J. Fields	Democratic	1910	Incumbent re-elected.	▌ ✓ William J. Fields (Democratic) 65.5%; ▌J. H. Stricklin (Republican) 34.5%
Kentucky 10	John W. Langley	Republican	1906	Incumbent re-elected.	▌ ✓ John W. Langley (Republican) 55.5%; ▌F. Tom Hatcher (Democratic) 44.5%
Kentucky 11	John M. Robsion	Republican	1918	Incumbent re-elected.	▌ ✓ John M. Robsion (Republican) 73.0%; ▌C. J. Sipple (Democratic) 21.9%; ▌H. S. Seavy (Farmer–Labor) 5.1%

== Louisiana ==
District	Incumbent			This race	
District	Member	Party	First elected	Results	Candidates
Louisiana 1	James O'Connor	Democratic	1918	Incumbent re-elected.	▌ ✓ James O'Connor (Democratic); Uncontested
Louisiana 2	H. Garland Dupré	Democratic	1908	Incumbent re-elected.	▌ ✓ H. Garland Dupré (Democratic); Uncontested
Louisiana 3	Whitmell P. Martin	Democratic	1914	Incumbent re-elected.	▌ ✓ Whitmell P. Martin (Democratic); Uncontested
Louisiana 4	John N. Sandlin	Democratic	1920	Incumbent re-elected.	▌ ✓ John N. Sandlin (Democratic); Uncontested
Louisiana 5	Riley J. Wilson	Democratic	1914	Incumbent re-elected.	▌ ✓ Riley J. Wilson (Democratic); Uncontested
Louisiana 6	George K. Favrot	Democratic	1920	Incumbent re-elected.	▌ ✓ George K. Favrot (Democratic); Uncontested
Louisiana 7	Ladislas Lazaro	Democratic	1912	Incumbent re-elected.	▌ ✓ Ladislas Lazaro (Democratic); Uncontested
Louisiana 8	James Benjamin Aswell	Democratic	1912	Incumbent re-elected.	▌ ✓ James Benjamin Aswell (Democratic); Uncontested

== Maine ==
District	Incumbent			This race	
District	Member	Party	First elected	Results	Candidates
Maine 1	Carroll L. Beedy	Republican	1920	Incumbent re-elected.	▌ ✓ Carroll L. Beedy (Republican) 58.7%; ▌Louis A. Donahue (Democratic) 41.3%
Maine 2	Wallace H. White	Republican	1916	Incumbent re-elected.	▌ ✓ Wallace H. White (Republican) 53.7%; ▌Bertrand G. McIntire (Democratic) 46.3%
Maine 3	John E. Nelson	Republican	1922	Incumbent re-elected.	▌ ✓ John E. Nelson (Republican) 58.4%; ▌Leon O. Tebbetts (Democratic) 41.6%
Maine 4	Ira G. Hersey	Republican	1916	Incumbent re-elected.	▌ ✓ Ira G. Hersey (Republican) 60.8%; ▌James W. Sewall (Democratic) 39.2%

== Maryland ==
District	Incumbent			This race	
District	Member	Party	First elected	Results	Candidates
Maryland 1	T. Alan Goldsborough	Democratic	1920	Incumbent re-elected.	▌ ✓ T. Alan Goldsborough (Democratic) 55.7%; ▌Charles J. Butler (Republican) 44.3%
Maryland 2	Albert Blakeney	Republican	1920	Incumbent lost re-election. Democratic gain.	▌ ✓ Millard Tydings (Democratic) 52.8%; ▌Albert Blakeney (Republican) 44.8%; Others: ▌William H. Champlin (Socialist Labor) 1.3%; ▌Richard A. O'Brien (Labor) 1.1%
Maryland 3	John Philip Hill	Republican	1920	Incumbent re-elected.	▌ ✓ John Philip Hill (Republican) 67.3%; ▌Anthony DiMarco (Democratic) 30.2%; Others: ▌Samuel M. Neistadt (Socialist Labor) 1.7%; ▌Verne L. Reynolds (Labor) 0.9%
Maryland 4	J. Charles Linthicum	Democratic	1910	Incumbent re-elected.	▌ ✓ J. Charles Linthicum (Democratic) 61.7%; ▌L. Edward Wolf (Republican) 35.1%; Others: ▌Joseph Dirner (Labor) 1.8%; ▌Clarence H. Taylor (Socialist Labor) 1.4%
Maryland 5	Sydney Emanuel Mudd II	Republican	1914	Incumbent re-elected.	▌ ✓ Sydney Emanuel Mudd II (Republican) 50.8%; ▌Clarence M. Roberts (Democratic) 45.1%; ▌Chester F. Gannon (Independent) 2.2%; Others: ▌F. W. Hartley-Hellyer (Independent) 1.0%; ▌Louis F. Guillotte (Labor) 1.0%
Maryland 6	Frederick N. Zihlman	Republican	1916	Incumbent re-elected.	▌ ✓ Frederick N. Zihlman (Republican) 50.7%; ▌Frank W. Mish (Democratic) 47.5%; ▌P. Oswald Weber (Socialist Labor) 1.8%

== Massachusetts ==
District	Incumbent			This race	
District	Member	Party	First elected	Results	Candidates
Massachusetts 1	Allen T. Treadway	Republican	1912	Incumbent re-elected.	▌ ✓ Allen T. Treadway (Republican) 50.7%; ▌Thomas F. Cassidy (Democratic) 49.3%
Massachusetts 2	Frederick H. Gillett	Republican	1892	Incumbent re-elected.	▌ ✓ Frederick H. Gillett (Republican) 59.6%; ▌Joseph E. Kerigan (Democratic) 40.4%
Massachusetts 3	Calvin Paige	Republican	1913 (special)	Incumbent re-elected.	▌ ✓ Calvin Paige (Republican) 56.4%; ▌M. Fred O'Connell (Democratic) 40.4%; ▌Leon S. Oliver (Nonpartisan League) 3.2%
Massachusetts 4	Samuel Winslow	Republican	1912	Incumbent re-elected.	▌ ✓ Samuel Winslow (Republican) 52.8%; ▌William H. Dyer (Democratic) 47.2%
Massachusetts 5	John Jacob Rogers	Republican	1912	Incumbent re-elected.	▌ ✓ John Jacob Rogers (Republican) 64.0%; ▌Andrew E. Barrett (Democratic) 36.0%
Massachusetts 6	A. Piatt Andrew	Republican	1921 (special)	Incumbent re-elected.	▌ ✓ A. Piatt Andrew (Republican) 77.0%; ▌Charles I. Pettingell (Democratic) 23.0%
Massachusetts 7	Robert S. Maloney	Republican	1920	Incumbent retired. Democratic gain.	▌ ✓ William P. Connery Jr. (Democratic) 56.0%; ▌Frederick Butler (Republican) 44.0%
Massachusetts 8	Frederick W. Dallinger	Republican	1914	Incumbent re-elected.	▌ ✓ Frederick W. Dallinger (Republican) 65.9%; ▌John F. Daly (Democratic) 34.1%
Massachusetts 9	Charles L. Underhill	Republican	1920	Incumbent re-elected.	▌ ✓ Charles L. Underhill (Republican) 57.7%; ▌Arthur D. Healey (Democratic) 42.3%
Massachusetts 10	Peter Francis Tague	Democratic	1914; 1918 (lost); 1919 (won challenge)	Incumbent re-elected.	▌ ✓ Peter Francis Tague (Democratic) 79.5%; ▌Loyal L. Jenkins (Republican) 20.5%
Massachusetts 11	George H. Tinkham	Republican	1914	Incumbent re-elected.	▌ ✓ George H. Tinkham (Republican) 60.3%; ▌David J. Brickley (Democratic) 39.7%
Massachusetts 12	James A. Gallivan	Democratic	1914	Incumbent re-elected.	▌ ✓ James A. Gallivan (Democratic) 75.9%; ▌Alexander H. Rice (Republican) 24.1%
Massachusetts 13	Robert Luce	Republican	1918	Incumbent re-elected.	▌ ✓ Robert Luce (Republican); Uncontested
Massachusetts 14	Louis A. Frothingham	Republican	1920	Incumbent re-elected.	▌ ✓ Louis A. Frothingham (Republican) 63.3%; ▌David W. Murray (Democratic) 36.7%
Massachusetts 15	William S. Greene	Republican	1898	Incumbent re-elected.	▌ ✓ William S. Greene (Republican) 57.4%; ▌Arthur J. B. Cartier (Democratic) 42.6%
Massachusetts 16	Joseph Walsh	Republican	1914	Incumbent resigned to become Justice of the Massachusetts Superior Court. Republican hold. Winner was also elected to finish the term; see above.	▌ ✓ Charles L. Gifford (Republican) 54.4%; ▌James P. Doran (Democratic) 45.6%

== Michigan ==
District	Incumbent			This race	
District	Member	Party	First elected	Results	Candidates
Michigan 1	George P. Codd	Republican	1920	Incumbent retired. Democratic gain.	▌ ✓ Robert H. Clancy (Democratic) 55.4%; ▌Hugh Shepherd (Republican) 42.7%; ▌Ernest Schlenter (Socialist Labor) 1.7%; ▌Edward Oberly (Farmer–Labor) 0.3%
Michigan 2	Earl C. Michener	Republican	1918	Incumbent re-elected.	▌ ✓ Earl C. Michener (Republican) 57.4%; ▌James W. Helme (Democratic) 42.6%
Michigan 3	John M. C. Smith	Republican	1921 (special)	Incumbent re-elected.	▌ ✓ John M. C. Smith (Republican) 61.1%; ▌George Burr Smith (Democratic) 38.9%
Michigan 4	John C. Ketcham	Republican	1920	Incumbent re-elected.	▌ ✓ John C. Ketcham (Republican) 65.4%; ▌Homer S. Carr (Democratic) 34.6%
Michigan 5	Carl E. Mapes	Republican	1912	Incumbent re-elected.	▌ ✓ Carl E. Mapes (Republican) 71.0%; ▌Claude O. Taylor (Democratic) 29.0%
Michigan 6	Patrick H. Kelley	Republican	1914	Incumbent retired to run for U.S. senator. Republican hold.	▌ ✓ Grant M. Hudson (Republican) 61.3%; ▌Charles M. Adair (Democratic) 38.3%; ▌Hallen M. Bell (Farmer–Labor) 0.3%
Michigan 7	Louis C. Cramton	Republican	1912	Incumbent re-elected.	▌ ✓ Louis C. Cramton (Republican) 72.3%; ▌Patrick H. Kane (Democratic) 27.5%; ▌H. Kaumeier (Socialist Labor) 0.2%
Michigan 8	Joseph W. Fordney	Republican	1898	Incumbent retired. Republican hold.	▌ ✓ Bird J. Vincent (Republican) 63.4%; ▌De Witt Vought (Democratic) 36.6%
Michigan 9	James C. McLaughlin	Republican	1906	Incumbent re-elected.	▌ ✓ James C. McLaughlin (Republican) 95.7%; ▌W. H. Henderson (Socialist Labor) 4.3%
Michigan 10	Roy O. Woodruff	Republican	1920	Incumbent re-elected.	▌ ✓ Roy O. Woodruff (Republican); Uncontested
Michigan 11	Frank D. Scott	Republican	1914	Incumbent re-elected.	▌ ✓ Frank D. Scott (Republican) 69.3%; ▌Robert H. Rayburn (Democratic) 30.7%
Michigan 12	W. Frank James	Republican	1914	Incumbent re-elected.	▌ ✓ W. Frank James (Republican) 79.4%; ▌Frederick Kappler (Democratic) 20.6%
Michigan 13	Vincent M. Brennan	Republican	1920	Incumbent retired. Republican hold.	▌ ✓ Clarence J. McLeod (Republican) 69.8%; ▌Ferris H. Fitch (Democratic) 28.9%; ▌Carl H. Caspar (Socialist Labor) 1.3%

== Minnesota ==
District	Incumbent			This race	
District	Member	Party	First elected	Results	Candidates
Minnesota 1	Sydney Anderson	Republican	1910	Incumbent re-elected.	▌ ✓ Sydney Anderson (Republican) 57.3%; ▌James F. Lynn (Democratic) 42.7%
Minnesota 2	Frank Clague	Republican	1920	Incumbent re-elected.	▌ ✓ Frank Clague (Republican); Uncontested
Minnesota 3	Charles Russell Davis	Republican	1902	Incumbent re-elected.	▌ ✓ Charles Russell Davis (Republican) 69.8%; ▌Lillien Cox Gault (Democratic) 30.2%
Minnesota 4	Oscar Keller	Republican	1918	Incumbent re-elected.	▌ ✓ Oscar Keller (Republican) 58.7%; ▌Paul E. Doty (Democratic) 35.6%; ▌Patrick J. McCartney (Independent) 5.7%
Minnesota 5	Walter Newton	Republican	1918	Incumbent re-elected.	▌ ✓ Walter Newton (Republican) 53.8%; ▌John R. Coan (Democratic) 46.2%
Minnesota 6	Harold Knutson	Republican	1916	Incumbent re-elected.	▌ ✓ Harold Knutson (Republican) 60.9%; ▌Peter J. Seberger (Independent) 31.7%; ▌John Knutsen (Independent) 7.4%
Minnesota 7	Andrew Volstead	Republican	1902	Incumbent lost re-election. Farmer–Labor gain.	▌ ✓ Ole J. Kvale (Farmer–Labor) 59.7%; ▌Andrew Volstead (Republican) 40.3%
Minnesota 8	Oscar Larson	Republican	1918	Incumbent re-elected.	▌ ✓ Oscar Larson (Republican) 53.0%; ▌William L. Carss (Democratic) 47.0%
Minnesota 9	Halvor Steenerson	Republican	1902	Incumbent lost re-election. Farmer–Labor gain.	▌ ✓ Knud Wefald (Farmer–Labor) 56.3%; ▌Halvor Steenerson (Republican) 43.7%
Minnesota 10	Thomas D. Schall	Republican	1914	Incumbent re-elected.	▌ ✓ Thomas D. Schall (Republican) 80.6%; ▌Henry B. Rutledge (Progressive) 19.4%

== Mississippi ==
District	Incumbent			This race	
District	Member	Party	First elected	Results	Candidates
Mississippi 1	John E. Rankin	Democratic	1920	Incumbent re-elected.	▌ ✓ John E. Rankin (Democratic) 99.8%; ▌Gaston Therrell (Republican) 0.2%
Mississippi 2	Bill G. Lowrey	Democratic	1920	Incumbent re-elected.	▌ ✓ Bill G. Lowrey (Democratic) 94.7%; ▌William McDonough (Republican) 5.3%
Mississippi 3	Benjamin G. Humphreys II	Democratic	1902	Incumbent re-elected.	▌ ✓ Benjamin G. Humphreys II (Democratic) 97.0%; ▌B. B. Montgomery (Republican) 3.0%
Mississippi 4	Thomas U. Sisson	Democratic	1908	Incumbent lost renomination. Democratic hold.	▌ ✓ T. Jeff Busby (Democratic) 98.2%; ▌R. H. DeKay (Republican) 1.8%
Mississippi 5	Ross A. Collins	Democratic	1920	Incumbent re-elected.	▌ ✓ Ross A. Collins (Democratic) 96.3%; ▌Sherry B. Smith (Republican) 3.3%; ▌A. E. Lange (Independent) 0.4%
Mississippi 6	Paul B. Johnson Sr.	Democratic	1918	Incumbent retired. Democratic hold.	▌ ✓ T. Webber Wilson (Democratic) 98.2%; ▌John G. McGowan (Republican) 1.8%
Mississippi 7	Percy Quin	Democratic	1912	Incumbent re-elected.	▌ ✓ Percy Quin (Democratic) 97.4%; ▌H. C. Turley (Republican) 2.6%
Mississippi 8	James W. Collier	Democratic	1908	Incumbent re-elected.	▌ ✓ James W. Collier (Democratic) 99.0%; ▌W. L. Rice (Socialist Labor) 1.0%

== Missouri ==
District	Incumbent			This race	
District	Member	Party	First elected	Results	Candidates
Missouri 1	Frank C. Millspaugh	Republican	1920	Incumbent lost re-election. Democratic gain.	▌ ✓ Milton A. Romjue (Democratic) 55.8%; ▌Frank C. Millspaugh (Republican) 43.7%; ▌[FNU] Bevier (Socialist Labor) 0.4%
Missouri 2	William W. Rucker	Democratic	1898	Incumbent lost renomination. Democratic hold.	▌ ✓ Ralph F. Lozier (Democratic) 61.7%; ▌E. Y. Keiter (Republican) 38.1%; ▌Elias P. Anderson (Socialist Labor) 0.1%
Missouri 3	Henry F. Lawrence	Republican	1920	Incumbent lost re-election. Democratic gain.	▌ ✓ Jacob L. Milligan (Democratic) 52.1%; ▌Henry F. Lawrence (Republican) 47.9%
Missouri 4	Charles L. Faust	Republican	1920	Incumbent re-elected.	▌ ✓ Charles L. Faust (Republican) 51.5%; ▌William E. Spratt (Democratic) 48.4%; ▌E. M. Wormley (Socialist Labor) 0.1%
Missouri 5	Edgar C. Ellis	Republican	1920	Incumbent lost re-election. Democratic gain.	▌ ✓ Henry L. Jost (Democratic) 53.0%; ▌Edgar C. Ellis (Republican) 46.7%; Others: ▌Joseph G. Hodges (Socialist Labor) 0.3%; ▌Karl Oberhue (Socialist Labor) 0.1%
Missouri 6	William O. Atkeson	Republican	1920	Incumbent lost re-election. Democratic gain.	▌ ✓ Clement C. Dickinson (Democratic) 53.3%; ▌William O. Atkeson (Republican) 46.3%; ▌R. V. Shoemaker (Socialist Labor) 0.4%
Missouri 7	Roscoe C. Patterson	Republican	1920	Incumbent lost re-election. Democratic gain.	▌ ✓ Samuel C. Major (Democratic) 50.7%; ▌Roscoe C. Patterson (Republican) 48.9%; ▌[FNU] Cox (Socialist Labor) 0.5%
Missouri 8	Sidney C. Roach	Republican	1920	Incumbent re-elected.	▌ ✓ Sidney C. Roach (Republican) 54.6%; ▌Luella St. Clair Moss (Democratic) 45.4%
Missouri 9	Theodore W. Hukriede	Republican	1920	Incumbent lost re-election. Democratic gain.	▌ ✓ Clarence Cannon (Democratic) 56.6%; ▌Theodore W. Hukriede (Republican) 43.4%
Missouri 10	Cleveland A. Newton	Republican	1918	Incumbent re-elected.	▌ ✓ Cleveland A. Newton (Republican) 59.4%; ▌A. A. Alexander (Democratic) 38.7%; Others: ▌? Hoehn (Socialist Labor) 1.8%; ▌William Ungerer (Socialist Labor) 0.1%
Missouri 11	Harry B. Hawes	Democratic	1920	Incumbent re-elected.	▌ ✓ Harry B. Hawes (Democratic) 58.4%; ▌Bernard P. Bogy (Republican) 40.4%; Others: ▌E. J. Tschudin (Socialist Labor) 1.1%; ▌[FNU] Spalti (Socialist Labor) 0.1%
Missouri 12	Leonidas C. Dyer	Republican	1914	Incumbent re-elected.	▌ ✓ Leonidas C. Dyer (Republican) 56.7%; ▌David D. Israel (Democratic) 42.3%; Others: ▌[FNU] Skoven (Socialist Labor) 0.9%; ▌Charles Kuchan (Socialist Labor) 0.1%
Missouri 13	Marion E. Rhodes	Republican	1918	Incumbent lost re-election. Democratic gain.	▌ ✓ J. Scott Wolff (Democratic) 51.6%; ▌Marion E. Rhodes (Republican) 47.8%; ▌Andrew J. Macdonald (Socialist Labor) 0.6%
Missouri 14	Edward D. Hays	Republican	1918	Incumbent lost re-election. Democratic gain.	▌ ✓ James F. Fulbright (Democratic) 52.0%; ▌Edward D. Hays (Republican) 47.4%; ▌? Lionberger (Socialist Labor) 0.6%
Missouri 15	Isaac V. McPherson	Republican	1918	Incumbent lost renomination. Republican hold.	▌ ✓ Joe J. Manlove (Republican) 52.8%; ▌Frank H. Lee (Democratic) 46.3%; ▌Miles M. Jones (Socialist Labor) 1.0%
Missouri 16	Samuel A. Shelton	Republican	1920	Incumbent retired. Democratic gain.	▌ ✓ Thomas L. Rubey (Democratic) 53.7%; ▌Phil A. Bennett (Republican) 45.8%; ▌Henry M. Fouty (Socialist Labor) 0.6%

== Montana ==
District	Incumbent			This race	
District	Member	Party	First elected	Results	Candidates
Montana 1	Washington J. McCormick	Republican	1920	Incumbent lost re-election. Democratic gain.	▌ ✓ John M. Evans (Democratic) 57.0%; ▌Washington J. McCormick (Republican) 41.6%; ▌Lulu F. Dawley (Socialist Labor) 1.4%
Montana 2	Carl W. Riddick	Republican	1918	Incumbent retired to run for U.S. senator. Republican hold.	▌ ✓ Scott Leavitt (Republican) 54.3%; ▌Preston B. Moss (Democratic) 45.7%

== Nebraska ==
District	Incumbent			This race	
District	Member	Party	First elected	Results	Candidates
Nebraska 1	C. Frank Reavis	Republican	1914	Incumbent resigned. Democratic gain.	▌ ✓ John H. Morehead (Democratic) 49.2%; ▌Walter L. Anderson (Republican) 45.3%; ▌A. L. Tidd (Progressive) 3.2%; ▌E. Luella Barton (Prohibition) 2.4%
Nebraska 2	Albert W. Jefferis	Republican	1918	Incumbent retired to run for U.S. senator. Republican hold.	▌ ✓ Willis G. Sears (Republican) 48.2%; ▌James H. Hanley (Democratic) 46.2%; ▌Roy M. Harrop (Progressive) 5.6%
Nebraska 3	Robert E. Evans	Republican	1918	Incumbent lost re-election. Democratic gain.	▌ ✓ Edgar Howard (Democratic) 48.4%; ▌Robert E. Evans (Republican) 45.7%; ▌John Havekost (Progressive) 5.9%
Nebraska 4	Melvin O. McLaughlin	Republican	1918	Incumbent re-elected.	▌ ✓ Melvin O. McLaughlin (Republican) 51.0%; ▌H. B. Cummins (Democratic) 43.8%; ▌John A. Schmidt (Progressive) 5.2%
Nebraska 5	William E. Andrews	Republican	1918	Incumbent lost re-election. Democratic gain.	▌ ✓ Ashton C. Shallenberger (Democratic) 45.9%; ▌William E. Andrews (Republican) 43.4%; ▌S. J. Franklin (Progressive) 10.7%
Nebraska 6	Moses P. Kinkaid	Republican	1902	Incumbent died. Republican hold.	▌ ✓ Robert G. Simmons (Republican) 51.3%; ▌Charles W. Beal (Democratic) 44.2%; ▌John A. Smith (Independent) 4.5%

== Nevada ==
District	Incumbent			This race	
District	Member	Party	First elected	Results	Candidates
Nevada at-large	Samuel S. Arentz	Republican	1920	Incumbent retired to run for U.S. senator. Democratic gain.	▌ ✓ Charles L. Richards (Democratic) 57.0%; ▌A. Grant Miller (Republican) 43.0%

== New Hampshire ==
District	Incumbent			This race	
District	Member	Party	First elected	Results	Candidates
New Hampshire 1	Sherman Everett Burroughs	Republican	1916	Incumbent retired. Democratic gain.	▌ ✓ William N. Rogers (Democratic) 54.5%; ▌John Scammon (Republican) 45.5%
New Hampshire 2	Edward Hills Wason	Republican	1914	Incumbent re-elected.	▌ ✓ Edward Hills Wason (Republican) 53.0%; ▌William H. Barry (Democratic) 47.0%

== New Jersey ==
District	Incumbent			This race	
District	Member	Party	First elected	Results	Candidates
New Jersey 1	Francis F. Patterson Jr.	Republican	1920	Incumbent re-elected.	▌ ✓ Francis F. Patterson Jr. (Republican) 60.5%; ▌Ethan P. Westcott (Democratic) 38.2%; ▌P. C. McCormick (Socialist Labor) 1.2%
New Jersey 2	Isaac Bacharach	Republican	1914	Incumbent re-elected.	▌ ✓ Isaac Bacharach (Republican) 69.8%; ▌Charles S. Stevens (Democratic) 30.2%
New Jersey 3	T. Frank Appleby	Republican	1920	Incumbent lost re-election. Democratic gain.	▌ ✓ Elmer H. Geran (Democratic) 50.3%; ▌T. Frank Appleby (Republican) 49.7%
New Jersey 4	Elijah C. Hutchinson	Republican	1914	Incumbent lost re-election. Democratic gain.	▌ ✓ Charles Browne (Democratic) 52.8%; ▌Elijah C. Hutchinson (Republican) 47.2%
New Jersey 5	Ernest R. Ackerman	Republican	1918	Incumbent re-elected.	▌ ✓ Ernest R. Ackerman (Republican) 56.7%; ▌Monell Sayre (Democratic) 41.8%; Others: ▌Sarah E. McLoughlin (Socialist Labor) 1.3%; ▌A. C. Thompson (Independent) 0.2%
New Jersey 6	Randolph Perkins	Republican	1920	Incumbent re-elected.	▌ ✓ Randolph Perkins (Republican) 52.5%; ▌Thomas A. Shields (Democratic) 47.5%
New Jersey 7	Amos H. Radcliffe	Republican	1918	Incumbent lost renomination. Republican hold.	▌ ✓ George N. Seger (Republican) 54.6%; ▌Wilmer A. Cadmus (Democratic) 43.5%; Others: ▌Frank Hubschmitt (Socialist Labor) 1.5%; ▌Harry Santhouse (Socialist Labor) 0.4%
New Jersey 8	Herbert W. Taylor	Republican	1920	Incumbent lost renomination. Democratic gain.	▌ ✓ Frank J. McNulty (Democratic) 58.5%; ▌Warren P. Coon (Republican) 40.5%; ▌Edward H. Mead (Socialist Labor) 1.0%
New Jersey 9	Richard W. Parker	Republican	1920	Incumbent lost re-election. Democratic gain.	▌ ✓ Daniel F. Minahan (Democratic) 52.6%; ▌Richard W. Parker (Republican) 47.4%
New Jersey 10	Frederick R. Lehlbach	Republican	1914	Incumbent re-elected.	▌ ✓ Frederick R. Lehlbach (Republican) 57.4%; ▌John F. Cahill (Democratic) 42.6%
New Jersey 11	Archibald E. Olpp	Republican	1920	Incumbent lost re-election. Democratic gain.	▌ ✓ John J. Eagan (Democratic) 66.8%; ▌Archibald E. Olpp (Republican) 30.8%; Others: ▌James M. Reilly (Socialist Labor) 1.6%; ▌Charles A. Eypper (Independent) 0.8%
New Jersey 12	Charles F. X. O'Brien	Democratic	1920	Incumbent re-elected.	▌ ✓ Charles F. X. O'Brien (Democratic) 74.3%; ▌W. A. O'Brien (Republican) 25.0%; ▌Valentine Bausch (Socialist Labor) 0.7%

== New Mexico ==
District	Incumbent			This race	
District	Member	Party	First elected	Results	Candidates
New Mexico at-large	Néstor Montoya	Republican	1920	Incumbent retired. Democratic gain.	▌ ✓ John Morrow (Democratic) 54.4%; ▌Adelina Otero-Warren (Republican) 45.6%

== New York ==
District	Incumbent			This race	
District	Member	Party	First elected	Results	Candidates
New York 1	Frederick C. Hicks	Republican	1914	Incumbent retired. Republican hold.	▌ ✓ Robert L. Bacon (Republican) 57.6%; ▌S. A. Warner Baltazzi (Democratic) 39.3%; Others: ▌Barnet Wolff (Socialist Labor) 1.8%; ▌William A. Simons (Prohibition) 1.4%
New York 2	John J. Kindred	Democratic	1920	Incumbent re-elected.	▌ ✓ John J. Kindred (Democratic) 72.0%; ▌Frank E. Hopkins (Republican) 23.4%; ▌Peter J. Flanagan (Socialist Labor) 4.6%
New York 3	John Kissel	Republican	1920	Incumbent lost re-election. Democratic gain.	▌ ✓ George W. Lindsay (Democratic) 65.5%; ▌John Kissel (Republican) 26.0%; ▌William W. Passage (Socialist Labor) 8.3%; ▌F. K. Oakley (Prohibition) 0.3%
New York 4	Thomas H. Cullen	Democratic	1918	Incumbent re-elected.	▌ ✓ Thomas H. Cullen (Democratic) 76.5%; ▌Dominic E. Picon (Republican) 20.1%; ▌George L. Giefer (Socialist Labor) 2.8%; ▌George H. Vogel (Prohibition) 0.7%
New York 5	Ardolph L. Kline	Republican	1920	Incumbent lost re-election. Democratic gain.	▌ ✓ Loring M. Black Jr. (Democratic) 54.9%; ▌Ardolph L. Kline (Republican) 42.1%; ▌Louis Weil (Socialist Labor) 2.3%; ▌William M. McNichol (Prohibition) 0.7%
New York 6	Warren I. Lee	Republican	1920	Incumbent lost re-election. Democratic gain.	▌ ✓ Charles I. Stengle (Democratic) 48.3%; ▌Warren I. Lee (Republican) 43.5%; ▌Mina Eskenazi (Socialist Labor) 7.3%; ▌William E. Moore (Prohibition) 0.9%
New York 7	Michael J. Hogan	Republican	1920	Incumbent lost re-election. Democratic gain.	▌ ✓ John F. Quayle (Democratic) 53.4%; ▌Michael J. Hogan (Republican) 36.4%; ▌James Oneal (Socialist Labor) 9.4%; Others: ▌Lewis G. Brown (Prohibition) 0.6%; ▌Iago Goldstein (Independent) 0.3%
New York 8	Charles G. Bond	Republican	1920	Incumbent lost re-election. Democratic gain.	▌ ✓ William E. Cleary (Democratic) 56.4%; ▌Charles G. Bond (Republican) 32.1%; ▌David P. Berenberg (Socialist Labor) 11.1%; ▌David H. Howell (Prohibition) 0.4%
New York 9	Andrew Petersen	Republican	1920	Incumbent lost re-election. Democratic gain.	▌ ✓ David J. O'Connell (Democratic) 58.1%; ▌Andrew Petersen (Republican) 34.8%; ▌Wilhemus B. Robinson (Socialist Labor) 6.8%; ▌Frank Mershon (Prohibition) 0.4%
New York 10	Lester D. Volk	Republican	1920	Incumbent lost re-election. Democratic gain.	▌ ✓ Emanuel Celler (Democratic) 45.6%; ▌Lester D. Volk (Republican) 38.6%; ▌Jerome T. De Hunt (Socialist Labor) 14.7%; Others: ▌Bernard Cook (Prohibition) 0.6%; ▌James P. Cannon (Independent) 0.4%
New York 11	Daniel J. Riordan	Democratic	1906	Incumbent re-elected.	▌ ✓ Daniel J. Riordan (Democratic) 67.6%; ▌Joseph B. Handy (Republican) 29.9%; Others: ▌Walter Dearing (Socialist Labor) 1.8%; ▌D. Leigh Colvin (Prohibition) 0.7%
New York 12	Meyer London	Socialist	1920	Incumbent lost re-election. Democratic gain.	▌ ✓ Samuel Dickstein (Democratic) 60.9%; ▌Meyer London (Socialist Labor) 32.6%; ▌Louis Zeltner (Republican) 6.5%; ▌Albert T. Hull (Independent) 0.1%
New York 13	Christopher D. Sullivan	Democratic	1916	Incumbent re-elected.	▌ ✓ Christopher D. Sullivan (Democratic) 66.7%; ▌Murray Firstman (Republican) 17.8%; ▌Abraham Lefkowitz (Socialist Labor) 15.5%
New York 14	Nathan D. Perlman	Republican	1920	Incumbent re-elected.	▌ ✓ Nathan D. Perlman (Republican) 37.4%; ▌David H. Knott (Democratic) 34.8%; ▌Jacob Panken (Socialist Labor) 27.5%; ▌Kenneth S. Guthrie (Prohibition) 0.4%
New York 15	Thomas J. Ryan	Republican	1920	Incumbent lost re-election. Democratic gain.	▌ ✓ John J. Boylan (Democratic) 60.8%; ▌Thomas J. Ryan (Republican) 36.4%; ▌Leonard Kaye (Socialist Labor) 2.2%; ▌Aaron R. Lewis (Prohibition) 0.6%
New York 16	W. Bourke Cockran	Democratic	1920	Incumbent re-elected.	▌ ✓ W. Bourke Cockran (Democratic) 70.0%; ▌John C. O'Connor (Republican) 24.8%; ▌Jessie W. Hughan (Socialist Labor) 4.5%; ▌H. W. Livingston (Prohibition) 0.7%
New York 17	Ogden L. Mills	Republican	1920	Incumbent re-elected.	▌ ✓ Ogden L. Mills (Republican) 50.5%; ▌Herman A. Metz (Democratic) 46.0%; ▌Harry DeVoe (Socialist Labor) 2.7%; ▌R. J. McAusland (Prohibition) 0.8%
New York 18	John F. Carew	Democratic	1912	Incumbent re-elected.	▌ ✓ John F. Carew (Democratic) 66.8%; ▌Albert E. Schwartz (Republican) 23.1%; ▌Benjamin Howe (Socialist Labor) 9.7%; ▌H. D. Burnham (Prohibition) 0.3%
New York 19	Walter M. Chandler	Republican	1920	Incumbent lost re-election. Democratic gain.	▌ ✓ Samuel Marx (Democratic) 50.3%; ▌Walter M. Chandler (Republican) 44.2%; ▌Philip Zausner (Socialist Labor) 4.3%; Others: ▌George B. Youngs (Prohibition) 0.9%; ▌Cyrus H. DuBoys (Independent) 0.2%
New York 20	Isaac Siegel	Republican	1914	Incumbent retired. Republican hold.	▌ ✓ Fiorello H. LaGuardia (Republican) 38.3%; ▌Henry Frank (Democratic) 37.5%; ▌William Karlin (Socialist Labor) 23.7%; ▌Jacob B. Saludsky (Independent) 0.4%
New York 21	Martin C. Ansorge	Republican	1920	Incumbent lost re-election. Democratic gain.	▌ ✓ Royal H. Weller (Democratic) 48.1%; ▌Martin C. Ansorge (Republican) 47.6%; ▌Frank R. Crosswaith (Socialist Labor) 3.1%; Others: ▌Mamie Colvin (Prohibition) 0.9%; ▌Morris Van Veen (Independent) 0.2%
New York 22	Anthony J. Griffin	Democratic	1918	Incumbent re-elected.	▌ ✓ Anthony J. Griffin (Democratic) 72.8%; ▌Charles Francis Connolly (Republican) 17.7%; ▌Ernest Bohm (Socialist Labor) 9.2%; ▌George W. White (Socialist Labor) 0.3%
New York 23	Albert B. Rossdale	Republican	1920	Incumbent lost re-election. Democratic gain.	▌ ✓ Frank Oliver (Democratic) 56.5%; ▌Albert B. Rossdale (Republican) 28.2%; ▌Salvatore Ninfo (Socialist Labor) 13.9%; Others: ▌Luigi Miscione (Independent) 0.7%; ▌Luigi Antonio (Independent) 0.4%; ▌Leo Boeder (Prohibition) 0.3%
New York 24	Benjamin L. Fairchild	Republican	1920	Incumbent lost re-election. Democratic gain.	▌ ✓ James V. Ganly (Democratic) 47.4%; ▌Benjamin L. Fairchild (Republican) 42.2%; ▌Philip Umstadter (Socialist Labor) 10.5%
New York 25	James W. Husted	Republican	1914	Incumbent retired. Republican hold.	▌ ✓ J. Mayhew Wainwright (Republican) 53.3%; ▌Robert A. Osborn (Democratic) 43.4%; ▌H. Wilhelm Wessling (Socialist Labor) 3.3%
New York 26	Hamilton Fish Jr.	Republican	1920	Incumbent re-elected.	▌ ✓ Hamilton Fish Jr. (Republican) 61.1%; ▌Thomas Pendell (Democratic) 36.7%; ▌Alfred C. Perkins (Socialist Labor) 2.2%
New York 27	Charles B. Ward	Republican	1914	Incumbent re-elected.	▌ ✓ Charles B. Ward (Republican) 46.5%; ▌John J. Burns (Democratic) 43.1%; ▌H. Westlake Coons (Prohibition) 9.0%; ▌Boris Fogelson (Socialist Labor) 1.5%
New York 28	Peter G. Ten Eyck	Democratic	1920	Incumbent retired. Democratic hold.	▌ ✓ Parker Corning (Democratic) 55.3%; ▌Charles M. Winchester (Republican) 43.1%; ▌William S. Wensley (Socialist Labor) 1.6%
New York 29	James S. Parker	Republican	1912	Incumbent re-elected.	▌ ✓ James S. Parker (Republican) 60.5%; ▌William H. Faxon (Democratic) 37.8%; ▌Cornelius Beucher (Socialist Labor) 1.7%
New York 30	Frank Crowther	Republican	1918	Incumbent re-elected.	▌ ✓ Frank Crowther (Republican) 53.3%; ▌George H. Derry (Democratic) 41.8%; ▌Lawrence E. Gerrity (Socialist Labor) 4.9%
New York 31	Bertrand Snell	Republican	1915 (special)	Incumbent re-elected.	▌ ✓ Bertrand Snell (Republican) 61.4%; ▌J. Franklin Sharp (Democratic) 37.6%; ▌Edward S. Bly (Socialist Labor) 1.0%
New York 32	Luther W. Mott	Republican	1910	Incumbent re-elected.	▌ ✓ Luther W. Mott (Republican) 65.1%; ▌M. J. Daley (Democratic) 32.9%; Others: ▌John Seitz (Socialist Labor) 1.5%; ▌James Corbett (Farmer–Labor) 0.5%
New York 33	Homer P. Snyder	Republican	1914	Incumbent re-elected.	▌ ✓ Homer P. Snyder (Republican) 49.6%; ▌Fred Sisson (Democratic) 46.7%; ▌Charles L. Letson (Socialist Labor) 2.2%; ▌William Harrison (Prohibition) 1.5%
New York 34	John D. Clarke	Republican	1920	Incumbent re-elected.	▌ ✓ John D. Clarke (Republican) 62.7%; ▌Clayton L. Wheeler (Democratic) 35.7%; ▌Arthur Breckinridge (Socialist Labor) 1.6%
New York 35	Walter W. Magee	Republican	1914	Incumbent re-elected.	▌ ✓ Walter W. Magee (Republican) 54.1%; ▌Frederick W. Thomson (Democratic) 43.4%; ▌Fred Sander (Socialist Labor) 2.4%
New York 36	Norman J. Gould	Republican	1915 (special)	Incumbent retired. Republican hold.	▌ ✓ John Taber (Republican) 65.5%; ▌David J. Sims (Democratic) 34.5%
New York 37	Lewis Henry	Republican	1922 (special)	Incumbent lost renomination. Republican hold.	▌ ✓ Gale H. Stalker (Republican) 59.1%; ▌Charles P. Smith (Democratic) 39.7%; ▌William J. C. Wismar (Socialist Labor) 1.2%
New York 38	Thomas B. Dunn	Republican	1912	Incumbent retired. Democratic gain.	▌ ✓ Meyer Jacobstein (Democratic) 47.7%; ▌Frederick T. Pierson (Republican) 45.5%; ▌Joel Moses (Socialist Labor) 6.9%
New York 39	Archie D. Sanders	Republican	1916	Incumbent re-elected.	▌ ✓ Archie D. Sanders (Republican) 60.5%; ▌David A. White (Democratic) 36.1%; ▌Clark Allis (Prohibition) 3.4%
New York 40	S. Wallace Dempsey	Republican	1914	Incumbent re-elected.	▌ ✓ S. Wallace Dempsey (Republican) 63.4%; ▌Philip Clancy (Democratic) 32.8%; ▌John W. Slacer (Prohibition) 3.8%
New York 41	Clarence MacGregor	Republican	1918	Incumbent re-elected.	▌ ✓ Clarence MacGregor (Republican) 55.4%; ▌William P. Greiner (Democratic) 35.7%; ▌Frank Ehrenfried (Socialist Labor) 8.9%
New York 42	James M. Mead	Democratic	1918	Incumbent re-elected.	▌ ✓ James M. Mead (Democratic) 61.9%; ▌Louis J. Schwendler (Republican) 30.9%; ▌Jacob F. Griesinger (Socialist Labor) 7.2%
New York 43	Daniel A. Reed	Republican	1918	Incumbent re-elected.	▌ ✓ Daniel A. Reed (Republican) 70.5%; ▌Frederick Garfield (Democratic) 26.7%; ▌Conrad Axelsohn (Socialist Labor) 2.2%; ▌J. William Sanbury (Farmer–Labor) 0.6%

== North Carolina ==
District	Incumbent			This race	
District	Member	Party	First elected	Results	Candidates
North Carolina 1	Hallett Sydney Ward	Democratic	1920	Incumbent re-elected.	▌ ✓ Hallett Sydney Ward (Democratic) 75.0%; ▌C. E. Kranmer (Republican) 25.0%
North Carolina 2	Claude Kitchin	Democratic	1900	Incumbent re-elected.	▌ ✓ Claude Kitchin (Democratic); Uncontested
North Carolina 3	Samuel M. Brinson	Democratic	1918	Incumbent died. Democratic hold.	▌ ✓ Charles L. Abernethy (Democratic) 67.1%; ▌Thomas J. Hood (Republican) 32.9%
North Carolina 4	Edward W. Pou	Democratic	1900	Incumbent re-elected.	▌ ✓ Edward W. Pou (Democratic) 66.7%; ▌F. Eugene Hester (Republican) 33.3%
North Carolina 5	Charles Manly Stedman	Democratic	1910	Incumbent re-elected.	▌ ✓ Charles Manly Stedman (Democratic) 62.3%; ▌Lucy B. Patterson (Republican) 37.7%
North Carolina 6	Homer L. Lyon	Democratic	1920	Incumbent re-elected.	▌ ✓ Homer L. Lyon (Democratic) 74.0%; ▌William J. McDonald (Republican) 26.0%
North Carolina 7	William C. Hammer	Democratic	1920	Incumbent re-elected.	▌ ✓ William C. Hammer (Democratic) 56.5%; ▌W. B. Love (Republican) 43.5%
North Carolina 8	Robert L. Doughton	Democratic	1910	Incumbent re-elected.	▌ ✓ Robert L. Doughton (Democratic) 56.4%; ▌J. Ike Campbell (Republican) 43.6%
North Carolina 9	Alfred L. Bulwinkle	Democratic	1920	Incumbent re-elected.	▌ ✓ Alfred L. Bulwinkle (Democratic) 59.9%; ▌R. H. Shuford (Republican) 40.1%
North Carolina 10	Zebulon Weaver	Democratic	1916	Incumbent re-elected.	▌ ✓ Zebulon Weaver (Democratic) 57.2%; ▌Ralph R. Fisher (Republican) 42.8%

== North Dakota ==
District	Incumbent			This race	
District	Member	Party	First elected	Results	Candidates
North Dakota 1	Olger B. Burtness	Republican	1920	Incumbent re-elected.	▌ ✓ Olger B. Burtness (Republican); Uncontested
North Dakota 2	George M. Young	Republican	1912	Incumbent re-elected.	▌ ✓ George M. Young (Republican) 69.8%; ▌J. W. Deemy (Progressive) 30.2%
North Dakota 3	James H. Sinclair	Republican	1918	Incumbent re-elected.	▌ ✓ James H. Sinclair (Republican) 64.2%; ▌E. J. Hughes (Democratic) 35.8%

== Ohio ==
District	Incumbent			This race	
District	Member	Party	First elected	Results	Candidates
Ohio 1	Nicholas Longworth	Republican	1914	Incumbent re-elected.	▌ ✓ Nicholas Longworth (Republican) 57.1%; ▌Sidney G. Stricker (Democratic) 39.0%; ▌Edward L. Hutchens (Farmer–Labor) 3.9%
Ohio 2	Ambrose E. B. Stephens	Republican	1918	Incumbent re-elected.	▌ ✓ Ambrose E. B. Stephens (Republican) 54.0%; ▌John R. Quane (Democratic) 40.6%; ▌Charles A. Herbst (Farmer–Labor) 5.4%
Ohio 3	Roy G. Fitzgerald	Republican	1920	Incumbent re-elected.	▌ ✓ Roy G. Fitzgerald (Republican) 51.8%; ▌Warren Gard (Democratic) 45.9%; ▌Joseph Woodward (Socialist Labor) 2.3%
Ohio 4	John L. Cable	Republican	1920	Incumbent re-elected.	▌ ✓ John L. Cable (Republican) 54.6%; ▌J. Henry Goeke (Democratic) 45.4%
Ohio 5	Charles J. Thompson	Republican	1918	Incumbent re-elected.	▌ ✓ Charles J. Thompson (Republican) 53.0%; ▌Frank C. Kniffin (Democratic) 47.0%
Ohio 6	Charles C. Kearns	Republican	1914	Incumbent re-elected.	▌ ✓ Charles C. Kearns (Republican) 52.8%; ▌William N. Gableman (Democratic) 47.2%
Ohio 7	Simeon D. Fess	Republican	1914	Incumbent retired to run for U.S. senator. Republican hold.	▌ ✓ Charles Brand (Republican) 58.0%; ▌Charles B. Zimmerman (Democratic) 42.0%
Ohio 8	R. Clint Cole	Republican	1918	Incumbent re-elected.	▌ ✓ R. Clint Cole (Republican) 52.1%; ▌H. H. Hartmann (Democratic) 47.9%
Ohio 9	William W. Chalmers	Republican	1920	Incumbent lost re-election. Democratic gain.	▌ ✓ Isaac R. Sherwood (Democratic) 51.3%; ▌William W. Chalmers (Republican) 48.7%
Ohio 10	Israel M. Foster	Republican	1918	Incumbent re-elected.	▌ ✓ Israel M. Foster (Republican) 63.0%; ▌James Sharp (Democratic) 37.0%
Ohio 11	Edwin D. Ricketts	Republican	1918	Incumbent lost re-election. Democratic gain.	▌ ✓ Mell G. Underwood (Democratic) 51.7%; ▌Edwin D. Ricketts (Republican) 48.3%
Ohio 12	John C. Speaks	Republican	1920	Incumbent re-elected.	▌ ✓ John C. Speaks (Republican) 55.1%; ▌H. Sage Valentine (Democratic) 44.2%; ▌William Garminden (Socialist Labor) 0.7%
Ohio 13	James T. Begg	Republican	1918	Incumbent re-elected.	▌ ✓ James T. Begg (Republican) 56.4%; ▌Arthur W. Overmyer (Democratic) 43.6%
Ohio 14	Charles L. Knight	Republican	1920	Incumbent retired to run for Governor; Democratic gain.	▌ ✓ Martin L. Davey (Democratic) 52.0%; ▌Frank E. Whittemore (Republican) 48.0%
Ohio 15	C. Ellis Moore	Republican	1918	Incumbent re-elected.	▌ ✓ C. Ellis Moore (Republican) 51.4%; ▌James R. Alexander (Democratic) 47.1%; ▌F. J. Ash (Independent) 1.6%
Ohio 16	Joseph H. Himes	Republican	1920	Incumbent lost re-election. Democratic gain.	▌ ✓ John McSweeney (Democratic) 52.2%; ▌Joseph H. Himes (Republican) 47.8%
Ohio 17	William M. Morgan	Republican	1920	Incumbent re-elected.	▌ ✓ William M. Morgan (Republican) 50.3%; ▌William A. Ashbrook (Democratic) 49.7%
Ohio 18	B. Frank Murphy	Republican	1918	Incumbent re-elected.	▌ ✓ B. Frank Murphy (Republican) 57.0%; ▌Marion Huffman (Democratic) 34.9%; ▌Jacob S. Coxey Sr. (Independent) 8.1%
Ohio 19	John G. Cooper	Republican	1914	Incumbent re-elected.	▌ ✓ John G. Cooper (Republican) 59.3%; ▌W. B. Kilpatrick (Democratic) 40.7%
Ohio 20	Miner G. Norton	Republican	1920	Incumbent lost re-election. Democratic gain.	▌ ✓ Charles A. Mooney (Democratic) 54.4%; ▌Miner G. Norton (Republican) 41.6%; ▌John G. Willett (Socialist Labor) 3.2%; Others: ▌James Goward (Socialist Labor) 0.5%; ▌James A. Murphy (Independent) 0.3%
Ohio 21	Harry C. Gahn	Republican	1920	Incumbent lost re-election. Democratic gain.	▌ ✓ Robert Crosser (Democratic) 55.1%; ▌Harry C. Gahn (Republican) 41.4%; ▌Henry Kuhlman (Socialist Labor) 2.9%; ▌Frank Kalcec (Socialist Labor) 0.5%
Ohio 22	Theodore E. Burton	Republican	1920	Incumbent re-elected.	▌ ✓ Theodore E. Burton (Republican) 73.4%; ▌William J. Zoul (Democratic) 26.1%; ▌D. B. Washburn (Independent) 0.5%

== Oklahoma ==
District	Incumbent			This race	
District	Member	Party	First elected	Results	Candidates
Oklahoma 1	Thomas A. Chandler	Republican	1920	Incumbent lost re-election. Democratic gain.	▌ ✓ Everette B. Howard (Democratic) 54.7%; ▌Thomas A. Chandler (Republican) 45.3%
Oklahoma 2	Alice Robertson	Republican	1920	Incumbent lost re-election. Democratic gain.	▌ ✓ William W. Hastings (Democratic) 57.7%; ▌Alice Robertson (Republican) 41.7%; ▌S. M. Gipson (Independent) 0.6%
Oklahoma 3	Charles D. Carter	Democratic	1907 (new state)	Incumbent re-elected.	▌ ✓ Charles D. Carter (Democratic) 74.2%; ▌Philas S. Jones (Republican) 24.8%; ▌M. L. Misenheimer (Socialist Labor) 1.0%
Oklahoma 4	Joseph C. Pringey	Republican	1920	Incumbent lost re-election. Democratic gain.	▌ ✓ Tom D. McKeown (Democratic) 65.2%; ▌Joseph C. Pringey (Republican) 34.2%; ▌L. A. Stanwood (Socialist Labor) 0.7%
Oklahoma 5	Fletcher B. Swank	Democratic	1920	Incumbent re-elected.	▌ ✓ Fletcher B. Swank (Democratic) 62.7%; ▌U. S. Stone (Republican) 36.6%; ▌Leonard Johnson (Socialist Labor) 0.7%
Oklahoma 6	L. M. Gensman	Republican	1920	Incumbent lost re-election. Democratic gain.	▌ ✓ Elmer Thomas (Democratic) 56.6%; ▌L. M. Gensman (Republican) 42.2%; Others: ▌J. V. Kolachny (Socialist Labor) 1.1%; ▌Alonzo Turner (Independent) 0.1%
Oklahoma 7	James V. McClintic	Democratic	1914	Incumbent re-elected.	▌ ✓ James V. McClintic (Democratic) 70.2%; ▌W. G. Roe (Republican) 27.8%; ▌William H. Conley (Socialist Labor) 2.0%
Oklahoma 8	Manuel Herrick	Republican	1920	Incumbent lost renomination. Republican hold.	▌ ✓ Milton C. Garber (Republican) 52.0%; ▌Zach A. Harris (Democratic) 46.7%; Others: ▌H. C. Geist (Socialist Labor) 1.1%; ▌Thomas P. Hopley (Independent) 0.2%

== Oregon ==
District	Incumbent			This race	
District	Member	Party	First elected	Results	Candidates
Oregon 1	Willis C. Hawley	Republican	1906	Incumbent re-elected.	▌ ✓ Willis C. Hawley (Republican); Uncontested
Oregon 2	Nicholas J. Sinnott	Republican	1912	Incumbent re-elected.	▌ ✓ Nicholas J. Sinnott (Republican) 59.1%; ▌James H. Graham (Democratic) 40.9%
Oregon 3	Clifton N. McArthur	Republican	1914	Incumbent lost re-election. Democratic gain.	▌ ✓ Elton Watkins (Democratic) 47.6%; ▌Clifton N. McArthur (Republican) 46.3%; ▌Robert G. Duncan (Independent) 3.3%; ▌F. T. Johns (Labor) 2.8%

== Pennsylvania ==
Pennsylvania was one of the only states to conduct redistricting between 1920 and 1922, when no nationwide reapportionment occurred. Incumbents have been shown in the most closely corresponding new districts. The four districts shown as new below replaced the four at-large seats used previously; since the at-large seats were all Republican held, the new districts are only nominally Republican gains.

District	Incumbent			This race	
District	Member	Party	First elected	Results	Candidates
Pennsylvania 1	William S. Vare	Republican	1912	Incumbent re-elected.	▌ ✓ William S. Vare (Republican) 83.7%; ▌Stephen Flanagan (Democratic) 14.7%; Others: ▌Samuel Braderman (Socialist Labor) 1.4%; ▌John A. C. Owens (Single Tax) 0.2%
Pennsylvania 2	George S. Graham	Republican	1912	Incumbent re-elected.	▌ ✓ George S. Graham (Republican) 85.4%; ▌Ellen Duane Davis (Democratic) 12.9%; Others: ▌Helen Murphy (Socialist Labor) 1.4%; ▌Frances I. Macauley (Single Tax) 0.4%
Pennsylvania 3	Harry C. Ransley	Republican	1920	Incumbent re-elected.	▌ ✓ Harry C. Ransley (Republican) 84.4%; ▌Edward P. Carroll (Democratic) 14.1%; Others: ▌Marcellus Wait (Socialist Labor) 1.4%; ▌Joseph Hagerty (Single Tax) 0.2%
Pennsylvania 4	George W. Edmonds	Republican	1912	Incumbent re-elected.	▌ ✓ George W. Edmonds (Republican) 74.2%; ▌Joseph K. Willing (Democratic) 23.1%; Others: ▌John Eiser (Socialist Labor) 2.5%; ▌Kitti Robinson (Single Tax) 0.3%
Pennsylvania 5	James J. Connolly	Republican	1920	Incumbent re-elected.	▌ ✓ James J. Connolly (Republican) 76.4%; ▌James J. Sweeney (Democratic) 18.9%; ▌Henry Close (Socialist Labor) 3.3%; Others: ▌Charles Bergen (Voters' League) 0.8%; ▌Oliver Wingert (Single Tax) 0.4%; ▌James Connolly (Welfare) 0.3%
Pennsylvania 6	None (new district)			New district. Republican gain.	▌ ✓ George A. Welsh (Republican) 73.4%; ▌Robert J. Sterrett (Democratic) 22.7%; ▌Robert Carson (Prohibition) 2.0%; Others: ▌John W. Quick (Socialist Labor) 1.7%; ▌Frederick E. Mayer (Single Tax) 0.2%
Pennsylvania 7	George P. Darrow; Redistricted from the 6th district	Republican	1914	Incumbent re-elected.	▌ ✓ George P. Darrow (Republican) 74.3%; ▌John W. Graham Jr. (Democratic) 22.8%; ▌William G. Toplis (Socialist Labor) 2.5%; ▌James F. McCormick (Single Tax) 0.4%
Pennsylvania 8	Thomas S. Butler; Redistricted from the 7th district	Republican	1896	Incumbent re-elected.	▌ ✓ Thomas S. Butler (Republican) 61.1%; ▌William T. Ellis (Democratic) 36.9%; Others: ▌Julia R. Hazard (Prohibition) 1.1%; ▌Albert J. Vernon (Socialist Labor) 0.8%
Pennsylvania 9	Henry Winfield Watson; Redistricted from the 8th district	Republican	1914	Incumbent re-elected.	▌ ✓ Henry Winfield Watson (Republican) 61.8%; ▌C. William Freed (Democratic) 34.9%; Others: ▌C. W. Rambo (Prohibition) 1.8%; ▌Elmer Young (Socialist Labor) 1.5%
Pennsylvania 10	William W. Griest; Redistricted from the 9th district	Republican	1908	Incumbent re-elected.	▌ ✓ William W. Griest (Republican) 52.8%; ▌Frank C. Musser (Democratic) 47.2%
Pennsylvania 11	Charles R. Connell; Redistricted from the 10th district	Republican	1920	Incumbent died. Republican hold.	▌ ✓ Laurence H. Watres (Republican) 50.1%; ▌Patrick McLane (Democratic) 48.5%; ▌George Hart (Independent) 1.4%
Pennsylvania 12	Clarence D. Coughlin; Redistricted from the 11th district	Republican	1920	Incumbent lost re-election. Democratic gain.	▌ ✓ John J. Casey (Democratic) 54.1%; ▌Clarence D. Coughlin (Republican) 45.9%
Pennsylvania 13	John Reber; Redistricted from the 12th district	Republican	1918	Incumbent retired. Republican hold.	▌ ✓ George F. Brumm (Republican) 52.9%; ▌Charles F. Ditchey (Democratic) 44.0%; ▌Con F. Foley (Socialist Labor) 3.1%
Pennsylvania 14	Fred B. Gernerd; Redistricted from the 13th district	Republican	1920	Incumbent lost re-election. Democratic gain.	▌ ✓ William M. Croll (Democratic) 48.2%; ▌Fred B. Gernerd (Republican) 45.2%; ▌George W. Snyder (Socialist Labor) 6.6%
Pennsylvania 15	Louis T. McFadden; Redistricted from the 14th district	Republican	1914	Incumbent re-elected.	▌ ✓ Louis T. McFadden (Republican) 64.0%; ▌T. Francis Carroll (Democratic) 36.0%
Pennsylvania 16	Edgar R. Kiess; Redistricted from the 15th district	Republican	1912	Incumbent re-elected.	▌ ✓ Edgar R. Kiess (Republican) 57.2%; ▌James M. Rook (Democratic) 39.2%; ▌P. A. McGowan (Socialist Labor) 3.6%
Pennsylvania 17	I. Clinton Kline; Redistricted from the 16th district	Republican	1920	Incumbent lost re-election. Democratic gain.	▌ ✓ Herbert W. Cummings (Democratic) 57.4%; ▌I. Clinton Kline (Republican) 42.6%
Pennsylvania 18	Benjamin K. Focht; Redistricted from the 17th district	Republican	1914	Incumbent lost renomination. Republican hold.	▌ ✓ Edward M. Beers (Republican) 54.7%; ▌King Alexander (Democratic) 44.5%; ▌John Sheets (Socialist Labor) 0.9%
Pennsylvania 19	Aaron S. Kreider; Redistricted from the 18th district	Republican	1912	Incumbent lost re-election. Democratic gain.	▌ ✓ Frank C. Sites (Democratic) 53.6%; ▌Aaron S. Kreider (Republican) 44.9%; ▌Sam Young (Socialist Labor) 1.6%
Pennsylvania 20	John M. Rose; Redistricted from the 19th district	Republican	1916	Incumbent retired. Republican hold.	▌ ✓ George M. Wertz (Republican) 42.0%; ▌Warren W. Bailey (Democratic) 40.9%; ▌R. M. Palmer (Independent) 9.1%; ▌Faber V. McCoskey (Labor) 8.0%
Pennsylvania 21	Evan J. Jones	Republican	1918	Incumbent lost renomination. Republican hold.	▌ ✓ J. Banks Kurtz (Republican) 47.5%; ▌D. S. Brumbaugh (Democratic) 41.4%; ▌Earl W. Rothrock (Socialist Labor) 11.1%
Pennsylvania 22	Edward S. Brooks; Redistricted from the 20th district	Republican	1918	Incumbent retired. Democratic gain.	▌ ✓ Samuel F. Glatfelter (Democratic) 53.1%; ▌Mahlon N. Haines (Republican) 42.3%; ▌George E. Smith (Independent) 3.4%; ▌George E. Barnhart (Socialist Labor) 1.2%
Pennsylvania 23	None (new district)			New district. Republican gain.	▌ ✓ William I. Swoope (Republican) 48.0%; ▌J. Frank Snyder (Democratic) 40.5%; ▌Elisha K. Kane (Prohibition) 11.5%
Pennsylvania 24	Samuel A. Kendall; Redistricted from the 23rd district	Republican	1918	Incumbent re-elected.	▌ ✓ Samuel A. Kendall (Republican) 54.0%; ▌Harrison N. Boyd (Democratic) 38.3%; ▌Herman G. Lepley (Socialist Labor) 5.9%; ▌Joseph Green (Independent) 1.8%
Pennsylvania 25	Henry W. Temple; Redistricted from the 24th district	Republican	1912	Incumbent re-elected.	▌ ✓ Henry W. Temple (Republican) 53.5%; ▌Charles I. Faddis (Democratic) 46.5%
Pennsylvania 26	None (new district)			New district. Republican gain.	▌ ✓ Thomas W. Phillips Jr. (Republican) 56.5%; ▌John G. Cobler (Democratic) 39.9%; ▌George F. Turner (Socialist Labor) 3.6%
Pennsylvania 27	Nathan L. Strong	Republican	1916	Incumbent re-elected.	▌ ✓ Nathan L. Strong (Republican) 53.6%; ▌Jane E. Leonard (Democratic) 37.1%; ▌William Anderson (Prohibition) 4.7%; ▌R. V. Johns (Socialist Labor) 4.6%
Pennsylvania 28	Harris J. Bixler	Republican	1920	Incumbent re-elected.	▌ ✓ Harris J. Bixler (Republican) 64.4%; ▌Charles E. Bordwell (Democratic) 33.0%; ▌N. H. Motsinger (Socialist Labor) 2.5%
Pennsylvania 29	Milton W. Shreve; Redistricted from the 25th district	Independent; Republican	1918	Incumbent re-elected as a Republican. Republican gain.	▌ ✓ Milton W. Shreve (Republican) 59.0%; ▌Charles N. Crosby (Democratic) 36.9%; ▌R. W. Tillotson (Socialist Labor) 4.1%
Pennsylvania 30	William H. Kirkpatrick; Redistricted from the 26th district	Republican	1920	Incumbent lost re-election. Democratic gain.	▌ ✓ Everett Kent (Democratic) 58.1%; ▌William H. Kirkpatrick (Republican) 40.5%; ▌George Druckenmiller (Socialist Labor) 1.4%
Pennsylvania 31	Adam M. Wyant; Redistricted from the 22nd district	Republican	1920	Incumbent re-elected.	▌ ✓ Adam M. Wyant (Republican) 53.4%; ▌James M. Cramer (Democratic) 40.1%; ▌Harry Eckard (Socialist Labor) 6.6%
Pennsylvania 32	Stephen G. Porter; Redistricted from the 29th district	Republican	1910	Incumbent re-elected.	▌ ✓ Stephen G. Porter (Republican) 70.1%; ▌P. M. O'Donnell (Democratic) 20.9%; ▌Power Gamble (Prohibition) 4.6%; ▌James J. Marshall (Socialist Labor) 4.5%
Pennsylvania 33	M. Clyde Kelly; Redistricted from the 30th district	Republican	1916	Incumbent re-elected.	▌ ✓ M. Clyde Kelly (Republican) 87.6%; ▌William Adams (Socialist Labor) 12.4%
Pennsylvania 34	John M. Morin; Redistricted from the 31st district	Republican	1912	Incumbent re-elected.	▌ ✓ John M. Morin (Republican) 72.8%; ▌William N. McNair (Democratic) 24.1%; ▌Albert R. Jerling (Socialist Labor) 3.1%
Pennsylvania 35	None (new district)			New district. Republican gain.	▌ ✓ James M. Magee (Republican) 53.9%; ▌Louis K. Manley (Democratic) 42.6%; ▌W. B. Miller (Socialist Labor) 3.5%
Pennsylvania 36	Guy E. Campbell; Redistricted from the 32nd district	Democratic	1916	Incumbent re-elected as a Republican. Republican gain.	▌ ✓ Guy E. Campbell (Republican) 91.7%; ▌Earl O. Gunther (Socialist Labor) 8.3%
Pennsylvania at-large (defunct)	William J. Burke	Republican	1918	Incumbents retired. District eliminated. Republican loss.	
Pennsylvania at-large (defunct)	Joseph McLaughlin	Republican	1920	Incumbents retired. District eliminated. Republican loss.	
Pennsylvania at-large (defunct)	Anderson H. Walters	Republican	1918	Incumbents retired. District eliminated. Republican loss.	
Pennsylvania at-large (defunct)	Thomas S. Crago	Republican	1921 (special)	Incumbents retired. District eliminated. Republican loss.	

== Rhode Island ==
District	Incumbent			This race	
District	Member	Party	First elected	Results	Candidates
Rhode Island 1	Clark Burdick	Republican	1918	Incumbent re-elected.	▌ ✓ Clark Burdick (Republican) 54.1%; ▌George F. O'Shaunessy (Democratic) 45.9%
Rhode Island 2	Walter R. Stiness	Republican	1914	Incumbent retired. Republican hold.	▌ ✓ Richard S. Aldrich (Republican) 52.6%; ▌Percy J. Cantwell (Democratic) 47.4%
Rhode Island 3	Ambrose Kennedy	Republican	1912	Incumbent retired. Democratic gain.	▌ ✓ Jeremiah E. O'Connell (Democratic) 62.6%; ▌Isaac Gill (Republican) 37.4%

== South Carolina ==
District	Incumbent			This race	
District	Member	Party	First elected	Results	Candidates
South Carolina 1	W. Turner Logan	Democratic	1920	Incumbent re-elected.	▌ ✓ W. Turner Logan (Democratic) 94.0%; ▌S. L. Blomgren (Republican) 6.0%
South Carolina 2	James F. Byrnes	Democratic	1910	Incumbent re-elected.	▌ ✓ James F. Byrnes (Democratic); Uncontested
South Carolina 3	Frederick H. Dominick	Democratic	1916	Incumbent re-elected.	▌ ✓ Frederick H. Dominick (Democratic); Uncontested
South Carolina 4	John J. McSwain	Democratic	1920	Incumbent re-elected.	▌ ✓ John J. McSwain (Democratic) 97.3%; ▌M. P. Norwood (Republican) 2.7%
South Carolina 5	William F. Stevenson	Democratic	1917 (special)	Incumbent re-elected.	▌ ✓ William F. Stevenson (Democratic); Uncontested
South Carolina 6	Philip H. Stoll	Democratic	1919 (special)	Incumbent lost renomination. Democratic hold.	▌ ✓ Allard H. Gasque (Democratic); Uncontested
South Carolina 7	Hampton P. Fulmer	Democratic	1920	Incumbent re-elected.	▌ ✓ Hampton P. Fulmer (Democratic) 98.5%; ▌J. C. Etheridge (Republican) 1.5%

== South Dakota ==
District	Incumbent			This race	
District	Member	Party	First elected	Results	Candidates
South Dakota 1	Charles A. Christopherson	Republican	1918	Incumbent re-elected.	▌ ✓ Charles A. Christopherson (Republican) 49.7%; ▌John Stedronsky (Democratic) 25.2%; ▌G. I. Hasvold (Nonpartisan League) 25.0%
South Dakota 2	Royal C. Johnson	Republican	1918	Incumbent re-elected.	▌ ✓ Royal C. Johnson (Republican) 64.5%; ▌Andrew F. Lockhart (Nonpartisan League) 32.9%; ▌Emmett C. Ryan (Democratic) 2.6%
South Dakota 3	William Williamson	Republican	1920	Incumbent re-elected.	▌ ✓ William Williamson (Republican) 49.2%; ▌George Philip (Democratic) 38.8%; ▌George H. Smith (Nonpartisan League) 12.0%

== Tennessee ==
District	Incumbent			This race	
District	Member	Party	First elected	Results	Candidates
Tennessee 1	B. Carroll Reece	Republican	1920	Incumbent re-elected.	▌ ✓ B. Carroll Reece (Republican) 77.0%; ▌J. T. Fugate (Socialist Labor) 23.0%
Tennessee 2	J. Will Taylor	Republican	1918	Incumbent re-elected.	▌ ✓ J. Will Taylor (Republican) 64.3%; ▌Rupert Reynolds (Democratic) 35.7%
Tennessee 3	Joseph Edgar Brown	Republican	1920	Incumbent retired. Democratic gain.	▌ ✓ Sam D. McReynolds (Democratic) 59.3%; ▌R. L. Burnett (Republican) 40.7%
Tennessee 4	Wynne F. Clouse	Republican	1920	Incumbent lost re-election. Democratic gain.	▌ ✓ Cordell Hull (Democratic) 62.6%; ▌Wynne F. Clouse (Republican) 37.4%
Tennessee 5	Ewin L. Davis	Democratic	1918	Incumbent re-elected.	▌ ✓ Ewin L. Davis (Democratic); Uncontested
Tennessee 6	Jo Byrns	Democratic	1908	Incumbent re-elected.	▌ ✓ Jo Byrns (Democratic); Uncontested
Tennessee 7	Lemuel P. Padgett	Democratic	1900	Incumbent died. Democratic hold.	▌ ✓ William C. Salmon (Democratic) 78.2%; ▌S. A. Vest (Republican) 21.8%
Tennessee 8	Lon A. Scott	Republican	1920	Incumbent lost re-election. Democratic gain.	▌ ✓ Gordon Browning (Democratic) 57.3%; ▌Lon A. Scott (Republican) 42.7%
Tennessee 9	Finis J. Garrett	Democratic	1904	Incumbent re-elected.	▌ ✓ Finis J. Garrett (Democratic) 84.8%; ▌Homer S. Tatum (Republican) 15.2%
Tennessee 10	Hubert Fisher	Democratic	1916	Incumbent re-elected.	▌ ✓ Hubert Fisher (Democratic) 89.1%; ▌Thomas C. Phelan (Republican) 10.9%

== Texas ==
District	Incumbent			This race	
District	Member	Party	First elected	Results	Candidates
Texas 1	Eugene Black	Democratic	1914	Incumbent re-elected.	▌ ✓ Eugene Black (Democratic) 93.5%; ▌G. T. Bartlett (Republican) 6.5%
Texas 2	John C. Box	Democratic	1918	Incumbent re-elected.	▌ ✓ John C. Box (Democratic) 94.8%; ▌C. A. Lord (Republican) 5.2%
Texas 3	Morgan G. Sanders	Democratic	1920	Incumbent re-elected.	▌ ✓ Morgan G. Sanders (Democratic) 91.7%; ▌L. B. Cranford (Republican) 8.3%
Texas 4	Sam Rayburn	Democratic	1912	Incumbent re-elected.	▌ ✓ Sam Rayburn (Democratic) 91.1%; ▌C. A. Gray (Republican) 8.9%
Texas 5	Hatton W. Sumners	Democratic	1914	Incumbent re-elected.	▌ ✓ Hatton W. Sumners (Democratic) 88.3%; ▌Heber Page (Republican) 11.7%
Texas 6	Rufus Hardy	Democratic	1906	Incumbent retired. Democratic hold.	▌ ✓ Luther A. Johnson (Democratic) 94.0%; ▌D. H. Merrill (Republican) 6.0%
Texas 7	Clay Stone Briggs	Democratic	1918	Incumbent re-elected.	▌ ✓ Clay Stone Briggs (Democratic) 93.3%; ▌Frank S. Camper (Republican) 6.7%
Texas 8	Daniel E. Garrett	Democratic	1920	Incumbent re-elected.	▌ ✓ Daniel E. Garrett (Democratic) 85.7%; ▌E. B. Barden (Republican) 14.3%
Texas 9	Joseph J. Mansfield	Democratic	1916	Incumbent re-elected.	▌ ✓ Joseph J. Mansfield (Democratic) 63.7%; ▌Willett Wilson (Republican) 36.3%
Texas 10	James P. Buchanan	Democratic	1912	Incumbent re-elected.	▌ ✓ James P. Buchanan (Democratic) 81.0%; ▌W. J. Kveton (Republican) 19.0%
Texas 11	Tom Connally	Democratic	1916	Incumbent re-elected.	▌ ✓ Tom Connally (Democratic) 90.8%; ▌R. A. Hanrick (Republican) 9.2%
Texas 12	Fritz G. Lanham	Democratic	1919 (special)	Incumbent re-elected.	▌ ✓ Fritz G. Lanham (Democratic) 84.1%; ▌Joe Kingsberry Jr. (Republican) 15.9%
Texas 13	Guinn Williams	Democratic	1922	Incumbent re-elected.	▌ ✓ Guinn Williams (Democratic) 93.1%; ▌John B. Schmitz (Republican) 6.9%
Texas 14	Harry M. Wurzbach	Republican	1920	Incumbent re-elected.	▌ ✓ Harry M. Wurzbach (Republican) 54.8%; ▌Harry Hertzberg (Democratic) 45.2%
Texas 15	John Nance Garner	Democratic	1902	Incumbent re-elected.	▌ ✓ John Nance Garner (Democratic); Uncontested
Texas 16	Claude B. Hudspeth	Democratic	1918	Incumbent re-elected.	▌ ✓ Claude B. Hudspeth (Democratic) 80.9%; ▌J. A. Simpson (Republican) 19.1%
Texas 17	Thomas L. Blanton	Democratic	1916	Incumbent re-elected.	▌ ✓ Thomas L. Blanton (Democratic) 91.6%; ▌W. D. Girand (Republican) 8.4%
Texas 18	John Marvin Jones	Democratic	1916	Incumbent re-elected.	▌ ✓ John Marvin Jones (Democratic) 93.7%; ▌H. O. Ward (Republican) 6.3%

== Utah ==
District	Incumbent			This race	
District	Member	Party	First elected	Results	Candidates
Utah 1	Don B. Colton	Republican	1920	Incumbent re-elected.	▌ ✓ Don B. Colton (Republican) 52.7%; ▌Milton H. Welling (Democratic) 44.2%; ▌John O. Watters (Socialist Labor) 3.1%
Utah 2	Elmer O. Leatherwood	Republican	1920	Incumbent re-elected.	▌ ✓ Elmer O. Leatherwood (Republican) 50.4%; ▌David C. Dunbar (Democratic) 46.1%; ▌E. G. Locke (Socialist Labor) 3.4%

== Vermont ==
District	Incumbent			This race	
District	Member	Party	First elected	Results	Candidates
Vermont 1	Frank L. Greene	Republican	1910	Incumbent retired to run for U.S. senator. Republican hold.	▌ ✓ Frederick G. Fleetwood (Republican) 52.1%; ▌James E. Kennedy (Democratic) 47.9%
Vermont 2	Porter H. Dale	Republican	1914	Incumbent re-elected.	▌ ✓ Porter H. Dale (Republican) 78.4%; ▌John J. Wilson (Democratic) 21.6%

== Virginia ==
District	Incumbent			This race	
District	Member	Party	First elected	Results	Candidates
Virginia 1	S. Otis Bland	Democratic	1918	Incumbent re-elected.	▌ ✓ S. Otis Bland (Democratic) 83.6%; ▌George N. Wise (Republican) 14.4%; ▌J. J. Jones (Republican) 2.0%
Virginia 2	Joseph T. Deal	Democratic	1920	Incumbent re-elected.	▌ ✓ Joseph T. Deal (Democratic) 86.6%; ▌P. S. Stephenson (Republican) 12.3%; ▌W. W. Foreman (Republican) 1.2%
Virginia 3	Jack Montague	Democratic	1912	Incumbent re-elected.	▌ ✓ Jack Montague (Democratic) 90.1%; ▌Channing M. Ward (Republican) 9.9%
Virginia 4	Patrick H. Drewry	Democratic	1920	Incumbent re-elected.	▌ ✓ Patrick H. Drewry (Democratic) 86.2%; ▌Herbert Rogers (Republican) 12.3%; ▌W. H. Gill (Independent) 1.5%
Virginia 5	J. Murray Hooker	Democratic	1921 (special)	Incumbent re-elected.	▌ ✓ J. Murray Hooker (Democratic) 70.9%; ▌Charles P. Smith (Republican) 29.1%
Virginia 6	James P. Woods	Democratic	1919 (special)	Incumbent lost renomination. Democratic hold.	▌ ✓ Clifton A. Woodrum (Democratic) 78.0%; ▌F. W. McWane (Republican) 22.0%
Virginia 7	Thomas W. Harrison	Democratic	1916	Incumbent re-elected.	▌ ✓ Thomas W. Harrison (Democratic) 62.3%; ▌John Paul (Republican) 37.7%
Virginia 8	R. Walton Moore	Democratic	1919 (special)	Incumbent re-elected.	▌ ✓ R. Walton Moore (Democratic) 83.3%; ▌John S. Wiley (Republican) 16.7%
Virginia 9	C. Bascom Slemp	Republican	1907 (special)	Incumbent retired. Democratic gain.	▌ ✓ George C. Peery (Democratic) 52.4%; ▌John H. Hassinger (Republican) 47.6%
Virginia 10	Henry St. George Tucker III	Democratic	1922	Incumbent re-elected.	▌ ✓ Henry St. George Tucker III (Democratic) 77.4%; ▌John Martin (Republican) 22.6%

== Washington ==
District	Incumbent			This race	
District	Member	Party	First elected	Results	Candidates
Washington 1	John Franklin Miller	Republican	1916	Incumbent re-elected.	▌ ✓ John Franklin Miller (Republican) 57.4%; ▌Edgar C. Snyder (Democratic) 25.5%; ▌Fred N. Nelson (Farmer–Labor) 17.2%
Washington 2	Lindley H. Hadley	Republican	1914	Incumbent re-elected.	▌ ✓ Lindley H. Hadley (Republican) 49.0%; ▌Fred A. Clise (Democratic) 26.1%; ▌P. B. Tyler (Farmer–Labor) 25.0%
Washington 3	Albert Johnson	Republican	1912	Incumbent re-elected.	▌ ✓ Albert Johnson (Republican) 76.2%; ▌J. M. Phillips (Farmer–Labor) 23.8%
Washington 4	John W. Summers	Republican	1918	Incumbent re-elected.	▌ ✓ John W. Summers (Republican) 68.5%; ▌Charles R. Hill (Democratic) 23.9%; ▌Elihu Bowles (Farmer–Labor) 7.6%
Washington 5	J. Stanley Webster	Republican	1918	Incumbent re-elected.	▌ ✓ J. Stanley Webster (Republican) 49.2%; ▌Sam B. Hill (Democratic) 45.2%; ▌Harry J. Vaughan (Farmer–Labor) 5.6%

== West Virginia ==
District	Incumbent			This race	
District	Member	Party	First elected	Results	Candidates
West Virginia 1	Benjamin L. Rosenbloom	Republican	1920	Incumbent re-elected.	▌ ✓ Benjamin L. Rosenbloom (Republican) 52.6%; ▌Raymond Kenny (Democratic) 47.3%; ▌John H. Snider (Independent) 0.1%
West Virginia 2	George M. Bowers	Republican	1914	Incumbent lost re-election. Democratic gain.	▌ ✓ Robert E. Lee Allen (Democratic) 51.5%; ▌George M. Bowers (Republican) 46.6%; ▌John C. Chase (Socialist Labor) 1.9%
West Virginia 3	Stuart F. Reed	Republican	1916	Incumbent re-elected.	▌ ✓ Stuart F. Reed (Republican) 50.5%; ▌Eskridge H. Morton (Democratic) 49.5%
West Virginia 4	Harry C. Woodyard	Republican	1914	Incumbent lost re-election. Democratic gain.	▌ ✓ George W. Johnson (Democratic) 50.7%; ▌Harry C. Woodyard (Republican) 49.3%
West Virginia 5	Wells Goodykoontz	Republican	1918	Incumbent lost re-election. Democratic gain.	▌ ✓ Thomas Jefferson Lilly (Democratic) 51.5%; ▌Wells Goodykoontz (Republican) 48.5%
West Virginia 6	Leonard S. Echols	Republican	1918	Incumbent lost re-election. Democratic gain.	▌ ✓ J. Alfred Taylor (Democratic) 54.2%; ▌Leonard S. Echols (Republican) 44.7%; ▌Homer James (Socialist Labor) 1.0%

== Wisconsin ==
District	Incumbent			This race	
District	Member	Party	First elected	Results	Candidates
Wisconsin 1	Henry A. Cooper	Republican	1920	Incumbent re-elected.	▌ ✓ Henry A. Cooper (Republican) 94.6%; ▌Niels P. Nielsen (Socialist Labor) 5.4%
Wisconsin 2	Edward Voigt	Republican	1916	Incumbent re-elected.	▌ ✓ Edward Voigt (Republican) 80.9%; ▌William F. Schanen (Democratic) 19.1%
Wisconsin 3	John M. Nelson	Republican	1920	Incumbent re-elected.	▌ ✓ John M. Nelson (Republican) 79.8%; ▌Martha Riley (Democratic) 20.2%
Wisconsin 4	John C. Kleczka	Republican	1918	Incumbent retired. Republican hold.	▌ ✓ John C. Schafer (Republican) 50.8%; ▌Edmund T. Melms (Socialist Labor) 49.2%
Wisconsin 5	William H. Stafford	Republican	1920	Incumbent lost re-election. Social-Democratic gain.	▌ ✓ Victor L. Berger (Social-Democratic) 53.3%; ▌William H. Stafford (Republican) 46.7%
Wisconsin 6	Florian Lampert	Republican	1918	Incumbent re-elected.	▌ ✓ Florian Lampert (Republican) 86.0%; ▌W. E. Cavanaugh (Democratic) 14.0%
Wisconsin 7	Joseph D. Beck	Republican	1920	Incumbent re-elected.	▌ ✓ Joseph D. Beck (Republican) 87.5%; ▌Bert A. Jollivette (Democratic) 12.5%
Wisconsin 8	Edward E. Browne	Republican	1912	Incumbent re-elected.	▌ ✓ Edward E. Browne (Republican) 92.0%; ▌Herman A. Marth (Socialist Labor) 8.0%
Wisconsin 9	David G. Classon	Republican	1916	Incumbent retired. Republican hold.	▌ ✓ George J. Schneider (Republican) 61.5%; ▌Henry Graass (Progressive) 38.5%
Wisconsin 10	James A. Frear	Republican	1912	Incumbent re-elected.	▌ ✓ James A. Frear (Republican) 98.5%; ▌Olin Swenson (Socialist Labor) 1.5%
Wisconsin 11	Adolphus Peter Nelson	Republican	1918	Incumbent lost renomination. Republican hold.	▌ ✓ Hubert H. Peavey (Republican); Uncontested

== Wyoming ==
District	Incumbent			This race	
District	Member	Party	First elected	Results	Candidates
Wyoming at-large	Franklin W. Mondell	Republican	1898	Incumbent retired to run for U.S. senator. Republican hold.	▌ ✓ Charles E. Winter (Republican) 52.6%; ▌Robert R. Rose (Democratic) 46.0%; ▌D. A. Hastings (Socialist Labor) 1.5%

== Non-voting delegates ==
District	Incumbent			This race	
District	Delegate	Party	First elected	Results	Candidates
Alaska Territory at-large	Daniel Sutherland	Republican	1920	Incumbent re-elected.	▌ ✓ Daniel Sutherland (Republican); [data missing]
Hawaii Territory at-large	Henry Alexander Baldwin	Republican	1922 (special)	Incumbent retired. Democratic gain.	▌ ✓ William Paul Jarrett (Democratic) 55.08%; ▌John Henry Wise (Republican) 44.92%

== See also ==
- 1922 United States elections
  - 1922 United States Senate elections
  - 1922 United States gubernatorial elections
- 67th United States Congress
- 68th United States Congress

== Sources ==
- "Statistics of the Congressional Election of November 7, 1922" (PDF). Clerk of the United States House of Representatives.
