= Joseph C. Pringey =

American politician (1858–1935)

Joseph Colburn Pringey
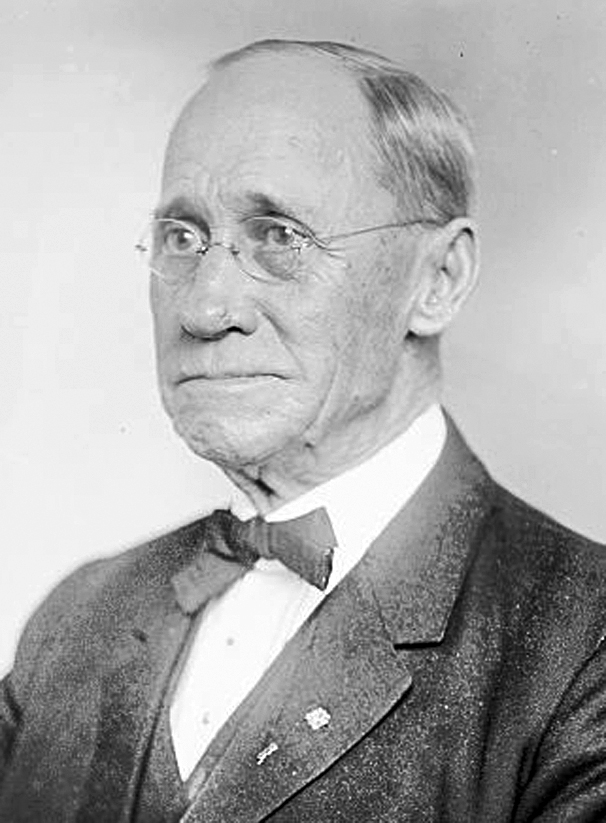

Member of the U.S. House of Representatives from Oklahoma's 4th district
- In office March 4, 1921 – March 3, 1923
- Preceded by: Thomas D. McKeown
- Succeeded by: Thomas D. McKeown

Personal details
- Born: May 22, 1858 Somerset, Pennsylvania
- Died: February 11, 1935 (aged 76) Chandler, Oklahoma
- Citizenship: American
- Party: Republican
- Spouses: Josephine Young Pringey; Zona Maxon Pringey
- Profession: farmer; politician; postmaster

Joseph Colburn Pringey (May 22, 1858 – February 11, 1935) was an American politician and a U.S. Representative from Oklahoma.

== Biography ==
Born in Somerset, Pennsylvania, Pringey was the son of George and Effie Colburn Pringey and attended the common schools. He moved to Missouri in 1870, and attended a business college in Sedalia, Missouri.

== Career ==
Pringey homesteaded a farm near Chandler when the Sac and Fox lands were opened for settlement in 1891. He was also involved in a loan and insurance business. A Republican, he became a member of the Oklahoma Territorial Senate in 1893. He served as member of the board of regents of the University of Oklahoma at Norman in 1893 and 1894, and as delegate to the Republican National Convention in 1900. County clerk of Lincoln County, Oklahoma from 1912 to 1920.

During World War I Pringey served on the Oklahoma Council of Defense and was a four-minute-man speaker. Elected as a Republican to the 67th Congress, he served from March 4, 1921 to March 3, 1923. While in Congress, he served on three committees, Expenditures in the Department of Labor, Pensions, and Public Buildings and Grounds. Sometimes called "Uncle Joe," he advocated compensation for soldiers who had served in World War I and called for a tariff to protect the farmer and laborer.

An unsuccessful candidate for reelection in 1922 to the 68th Congress, Pringey became Acting postmaster of Chandler, Oklahoma, in 1923 and 1924. He also resumed his agricultural pursuits.

== Death ==
Pringey died in Chandler, Oklahoma, on February 11, 1935 (age 76 years, 265 days). He is interred in Oak Park Cemetery.

U.S. House of Representatives
Preceded by Tom D. McKeown	Member of the U.S. House of Representatives from Oklahoma's 4th congressional district 1921-1923	Succeeded by Tom D. McKeown
