= Frank Irvine =

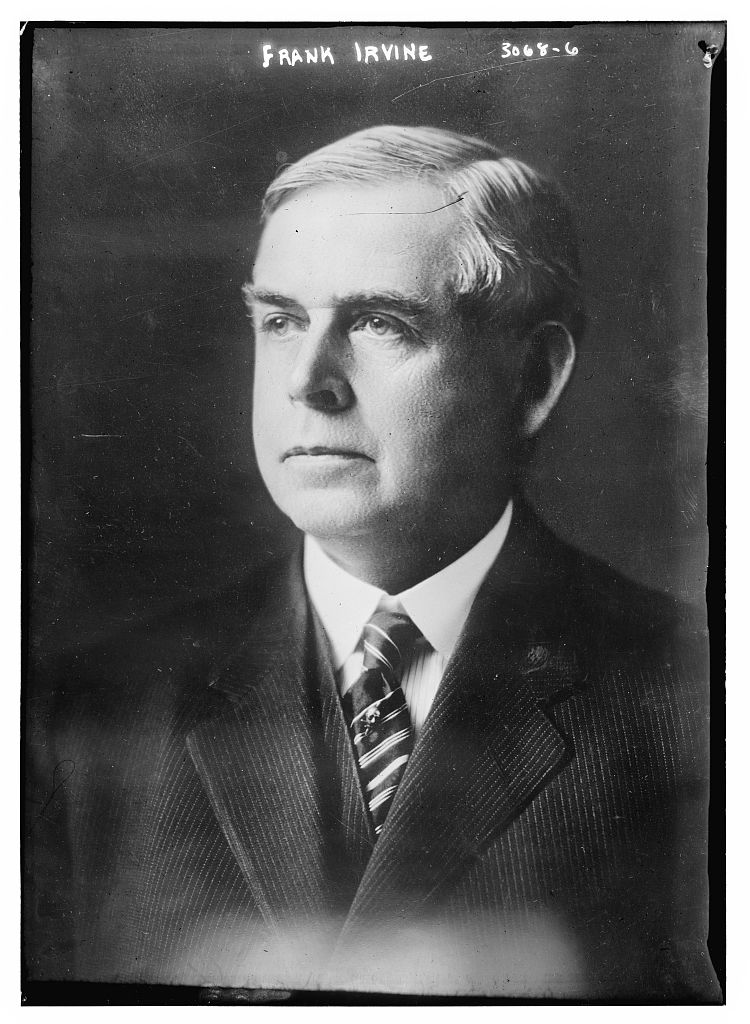

Frank Irvine (September 15, 1858 – June 23, 1931) was a federal judge, and later the dean of Cornell Law School.

== Biography ==
Born in Sharon, Pennsylvania, Irvine graduated from Cornell University in 1880, and from the National University School of Law in Washington, D.C., in 1883. After gaining admission to the bar in the District of Columbia working as an assistant to the United States district attorney until 1884, when he moved to Omaha, Nebraska. In 1891, Governor James E. Boyd appointed Irvine to a seat on the state district court.

In 1922 he was nominated for Congress. He died on June 23, 1931, in Ithaca, New York.
