= Jacob L. Milligan =

American politician

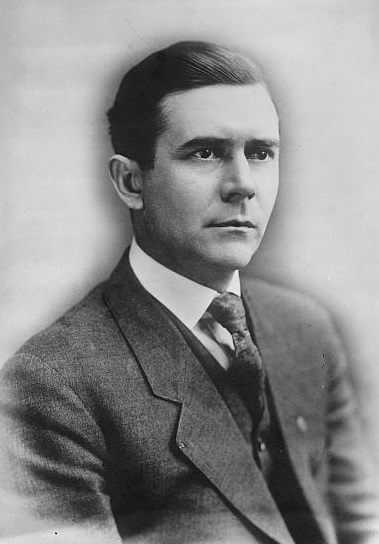

Member of the U.S. House of Representatives from Missouri
- In office February 14, 1920 – March 3, 1921
- Preceded by: Joshua W. Alexander
- Succeeded by: Henry F. Lawrence
- Constituency: 3rd district
- In office March 4, 1923 – January 3, 1935
- Preceded by: Henry F. Lawrence
- Succeeded by: None (district dissolved)
- Constituency: 3rd district (1923–1933); At-large (1933–1935)

Personal details
- Born: March 9, 1889 Richmond, Missouri, U.S.
- Died: March 9, 1951 (aged 62) Kansas City, Missouri
- Party: Democratic
- Spouse: Celeste Fortenberry
- Education: University of Missouri
- Website: House website

Jacob Le Roy Milligan (March 9, 1889 – March 9, 1951) was a United States representative from Missouri.

== Biography ==
Born in Richmond, Missouri, Milligan attended the public schools and the law department of the University of Missouri 1910-1914.

He was admitted to the bar in 1913 and commenced practice in Richmond, in 1914. During World War I, he enlisted in the Sixth Regiment, Missouri Infantry, on April 8, 1917. He served as captain of Company G, One Hundred and Fortieth Infantry Regiment, Thirty-fifth Division, from August 4, 1917, to May 15, 1919. He received the Purple Heart and Silver Star. He returned April 28, 1919.

Milligan was elected as a Democrat to the Sixty-sixth Congress to fill the vacancy caused by the resignation of Joshua W. Alexander and served from February 14, 1920, to March 3, 1921. He was an unsuccessful candidate for reelection in 1920 to the Sixty-seventh Congress. He later served as delegate to the Democratic National Convention in 1928.

Milligan was elected to the Sixty-eighth and to the five succeeding Congresses (March 4, 1923 – January 3, 1935). He was not a candidate for renomination in 1934 but was an unsuccessful candidate for nomination for United States Senator. He and fellow Representative John J. Cochran were defeated by Harry S. Truman. Jacob Milligan's brother Maurice M. Milligan challenged Truman in the Democratic primary for his reelection campaign in 1940.

Jacob Milligan resumed the practice of law and served as president of Kansas City Police Board from 1949 to 1950.

He died in Kansas City, Missouri on his sixty-second birthday, March 9, 1951, and was interred in Fairview Cemetery, Liberty, Missouri.

U.S. House of Representatives
Preceded by Joshua W. Alexander	Member of the U.S. House of Representatives from Missouri's 3rd congressional district 1920-1921	Succeeded by Henry F. Lawrence
Preceded by Henry F. Lawrence	Member of the U.S. House of Representatives from Missouri's 3rd congressional district 1923-1933	Succeeded by None (District dissolved)
Preceded by None (New district)	Member of the U.S. House of Representatives from Missouri's at-large congressional district 1933-1935	Succeeded by None (District dissolved)
