= Henry F. Lawrence =

American politician (1868–1950)

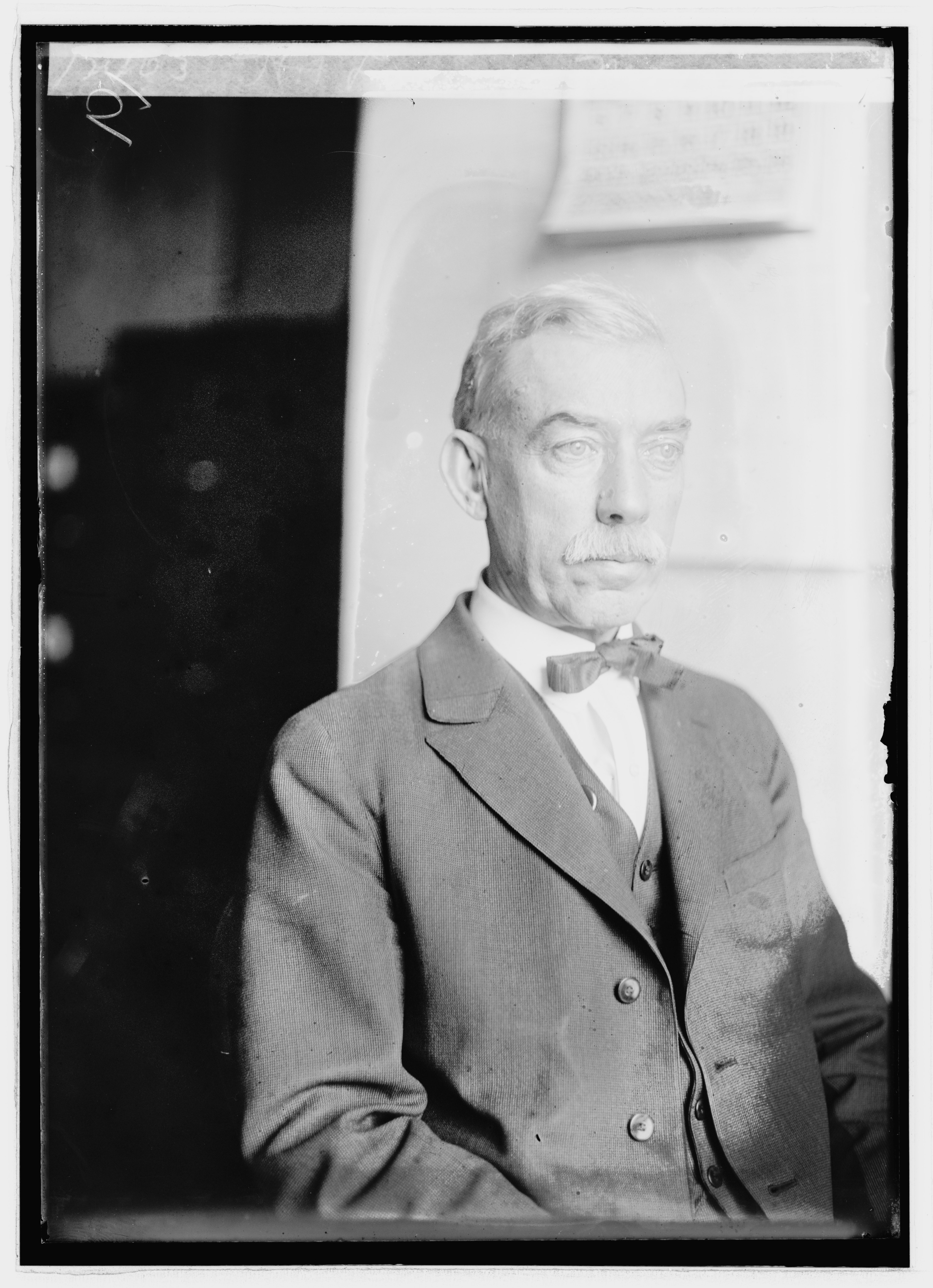

Member of the U.S. House of Representatives from Missouri's 3rd district
- In office March 4, 1921 – March 3, 1923
- Preceded by: Jacob L. Milligan
- Succeeded by: Jacob L. Milligan

Personal details
- Born: January 31, 1868 near Greensburg, Indiana
- Died: January 12, 1950 (aged 81) Cameron, Missouri
- Party: Republican

Henry Franklin Lawrence (January 31, 1868 – January 12, 1950) was a U.S. representative from Missouri.

Born near Greensburg, Indiana, Lawrence attended the public schools, the local high school, and Stanberry (Missouri) Normal School. He moved to Cameron, Missouri, and engaged in banking. He served as clerk of Daviess County 1907–1911. He served as mayor of Cameron 1914–1918.

Lawrence was elected as a Republican to the Sixty-seventh Congress (March 4, 1921 – March 3, 1923). He was an unsuccessful candidate for reelection in 1922 to the Sixty-eighth Congress. He served as a delegate to the Republican National Convention in 1924. He was employed with the State finance department of Missouri. He died in Cameron, Missouri, January 12, 1950. He was interred in Graceland Cemetery.

U.S. House of Representatives
Preceded by Jacob L. Milligan	Member of the U.S. House of Representatives from Missouri's 3rd congressional district 1921-1923	Succeeded by Jacob L. Milligan
