= Tom D. McKeown =

American politician

Thomas Deitz McKeown
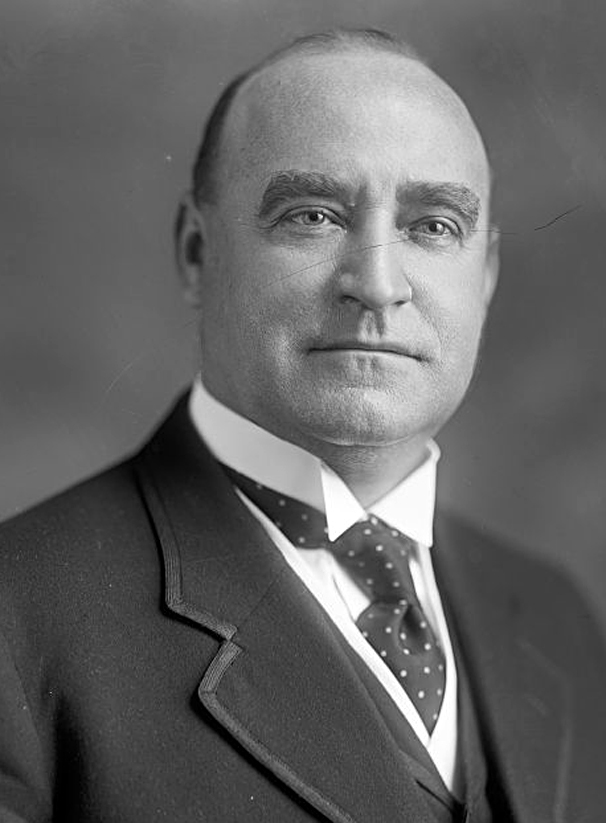

Member of the U.S. House of Representatives from Oklahoma's 4th district
- In office March 4, 1917 – March 3, 1921
- Preceded by: William H. Murray
- Succeeded by: Joseph C. Pringey
- In office March 4, 1923 – January 3, 1935
- Preceded by: Joseph C. Pringey
- Succeeded by: Percy Lee Gassaway

Personal details
- Born: June 4, 1878 Blackstock, South Carolina, United States
- Died: October 22, 1951 (aged 73) Ada, Oklahoma
- Party: Democratic
- Spouse: Anna Jane Sanders McKeown
- Education: Cornell University
- Profession: Attorney, judge, politician, farmer, oil producer

Thomas Deitz McKeown (June 4, 1878 – October 22, 1951) was a U.S. representative from Oklahoma.

== Biography ==
Born in Blackstock, South Carolina, McKeown was the son of Theodore B. and Nannie B. Robinson McKeown. He attended the common schools, studied under a private tutor and attended lectures at Cornell University, Ithaca, New York, in 1898. On January 9, 1902, he married Anna Jane Sanders.

== Career ==
Admitted to the bar in 1899, McKeown began practice in Malvern, Arkansas. He moved to Ada, Indian Territory (now Oklahoma), in 1901 and resumed the practice of law. He was appointed a member of the first State bar commission and elected president in 1909. He served as judge of the seventh district of Oklahoma from 1910 to 1914, and as presiding judge of the fifth division of the Oklahoma Supreme Court Commission in 1915 and 1916.

McKeown was elected as a Democrat to the Sixty-fifth and Sixty-sixth Congresses, and served from March 4, 1917 to March 3, 1921. An unsuccessful candidate for reelection in 1920 to the Sixty-seventh Congress, Mckeown was elected to the Sixty-eighth and to the five succeeding Congresses, serving from March 4, 1923 to January 3, 1935. He was an unsuccessful candidate for renomination in 1934.

For the years 1935 and 1936, McKeown moved to Chicago, Illinois, and resumed the practice of law. He returned to Ada, Oklahoma, in 1937 and engaged in farming and oil production. He served as a delegate to the Democratic State convention in 1942 and as county attorney of Pontotoc County, Oklahoma, from April 1, 1946, to January 1, 1947. He was appointed county judge in 1947 and elected in 1948 and again in 1950 and served until his death.

== Death ==
McKeown died in Ada, Oklahoma, on October 22, 1951 (age 73 years, 140 days). He is interred at Rosedale Cemetery, Ada, Oklahoma.

U.S. House of Representatives
| Preceded by William H. Murray | Member of the U.S. House of Representatives from Oklahoma's 4th congressional district 1917-1921 | Succeeded by Joseph C. Pringey |
| Preceded by Joseph C. Pringey | Member of the U.S. House of Representatives from Oklahoma's 4th congressional district 1923-1935 | Succeeded by Percy Lee Gassaway |
