= 1930 United States House of Representatives elections =

House elections for the 72nd U.S. Congress

- November 4, 1930 (Note: Maine's elections were held September 8, 1930.)

All 435 seats in the United States House of Representatives 218 seats needed for a majority
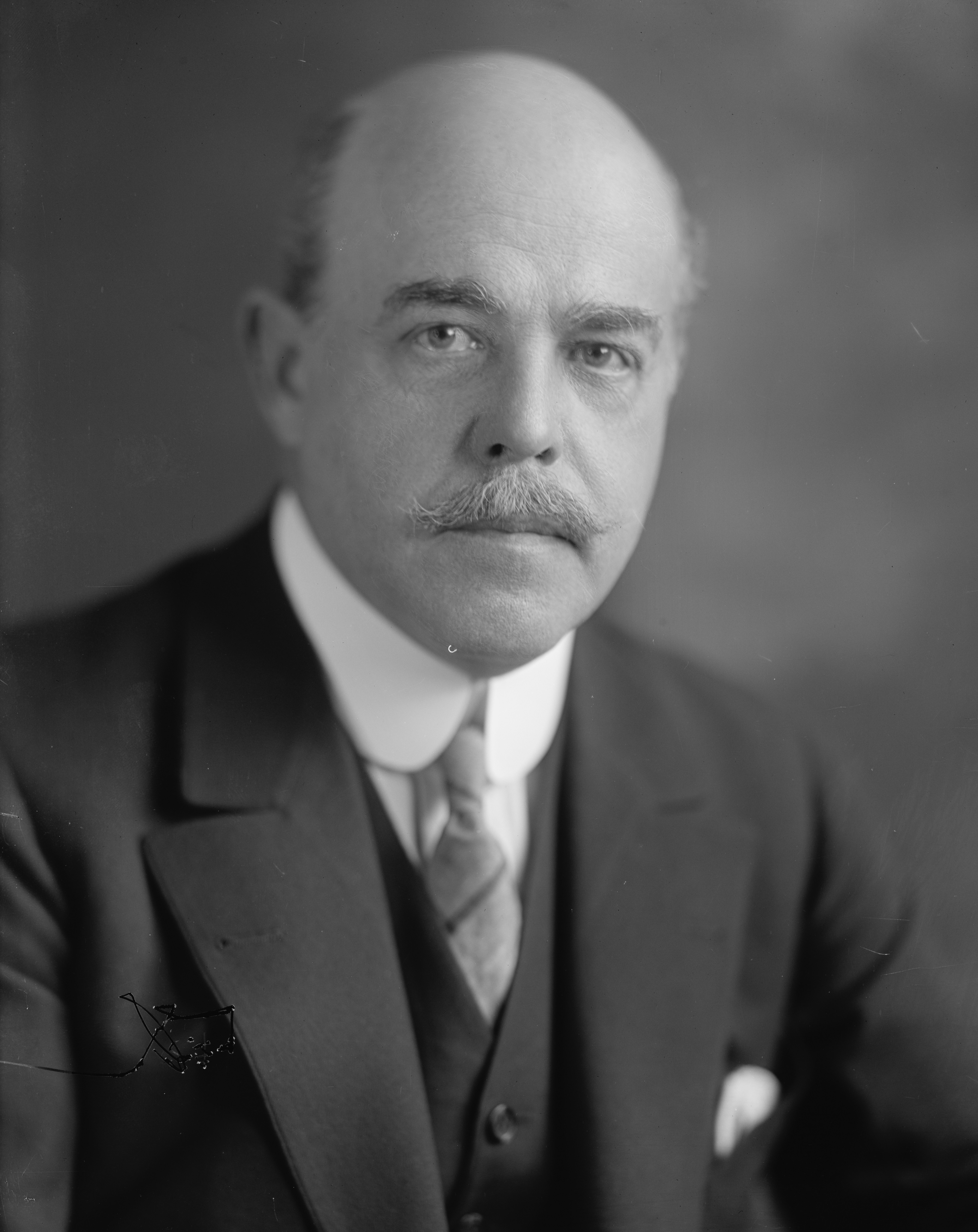

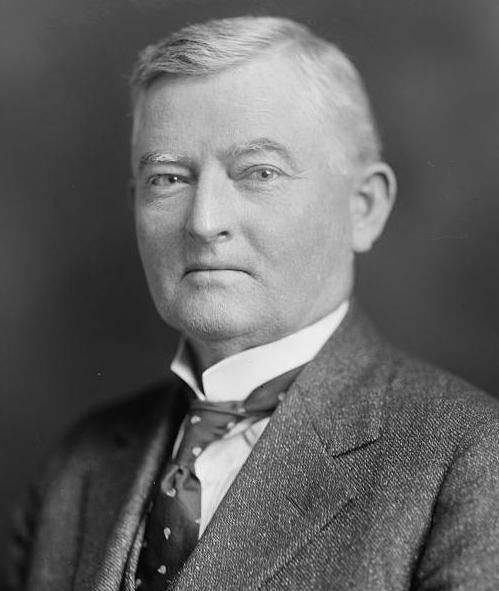
	Majority party	Minority party
Leader	Nicholas Longworth	John Nance Garner
Party	Republican	Democratic
Leader since	March 4, 1923	March 4, 1929
Leader's seat	Ohio 1st	Texas 15th
Last election	270 seats	164 seats
Seats won	218 (Note: By the December 1931 opening of Congress, Republicans had 212 seats to the Democrats' 219. Democrat John Nance Garner was subsequently elected Speaker.)	216
Seat change	▼52	▲52
Popular vote	13,141,932	11,026,131
Percentage	53.04%	44.50%
Swing	▼3.69pp	▲2.53pp
	Third party
Party	Farmer–Labor
Last election	1 seat
Seats won	1
Seat change	Steady
Popular vote	277,739
Percentage	1.12%
Swing	▲0.58pp
- Results: Republican gain Democratic gain Republican hold Democratic hold Farmer–Labor hold
Speaker before election
Nicholas Longworth
Republican
Elected Speaker
John Nance Garner
Democratic

The 1930 United States House of Representatives elections were elections for the United States House of Representatives to elect members to serve in the 72nd United States Congress. They were held for the most part on November 4, 1930, while Maine held theirs on September 8. They occurred in the middle of President Herbert Hoover's term.

During the election cycle, the nation was entering its second year of the Great Depression, and Hoover was perceived as doing little to solve the crisis, with his personal popularity being very low. His Republican Party was initially applauded for instituting protectionist economic policies, which were intended to limit imports to stimulate the domestic market; however, after the passage of the heavily damaging Smoot–Hawley Tariff, a policy that was bitterly opposed by the Democratic Party, public opinion turned sharply against Republican policies, and the party bore the blame for the economic collapse.

While the Democrats gained 52 seats in the 1930 midterm elections, Republicans retained a narrow one-seat majority of 218 seats after the polls closed versus the Democrats' 216 seats; however, between these elections and the convening of the 72nd Congress, 14 members-elect died (including incumbent Speaker Nicholas Longworth), and the Democrats gained an additional three seats in the special elections called to fill these vacancies, thus gaining control of the House (they held a 219–213 advantage over the Republicans when the new Congress convened).

This was the first of four consecutive Depression-era House elections in which Democrats made enormous gains, achieving a cumulative gain of 174 seats. Over the ensuing 64 years (until the 1994 midterm elections), House Republicans would be in the minority for all but four years, winning majorities only in 1946 and in 1952.

== Overall results ==
↓
216	1	218
Democratic	(Note: There was 1 Farmer–Labor member elected.)	Republican

Source: Election Statistics – Office of the Clerk

House seats
Democratic	49.66%
Farmer–Labor	0.23%
Republican	50.11%

Popular Vote
Republican	52.75%
Farmer–Labor	1.12%
Democratic	44.47%
Other	1.66%

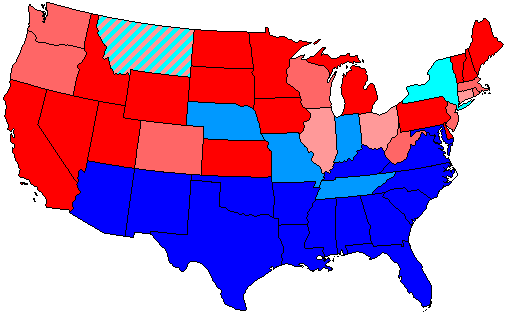
House seats by party holding plurality in state: 80+% Republican / 80+% Democratic; 60+ to 80% Republican / 60+ to 80% Democratic; up to 60% Republican / up to 60% Democratic

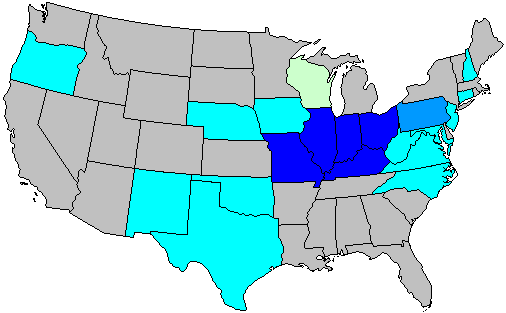
6+ Republican gain / 6+ Democratic gain; 3–5 Republican gain / 3–5 Democratic gain; 1–2 Republican gain / 1–2 Democratic gain; 1–2 Progressive gain no net change

== Special elections ==
Elections are listed by date and district.

District	Incumbent			This race	
District	Member	Party	First elected	Results	Candidates
Pennsylvania 10	William W. Griest	Republican	1908	Incumbent died December 5, 1929. New member elected January 28, 1930. Republican hold.	▌ ✓ J. Roland Kinzer (Republican) 77.27%; ▌William A. Brinkman (Democratic) 22.73%
Massachusetts 2	Will Kirk Kaynor	Republican	1928	Incumbent died December 20, 1929. New member elected February 11, 1930. Democratic gain. Winner later re-elected to the next term; see below.	▌ ✓ William J. Granfield (Democratic) 54.63%; ▌Frederick D. Griggs (Republican) 43.33%; ▌Whitfield Reid (Unknown) 1.90%; ▌William H. Feiker (Unknown) 0.13%
Kentucky 11	John M. Robsion	Republican	1918	Incumbent resigned January 10, 1930 to become U.S. senator. New member elected February 15, 1930. Republican hold.	▌ ✓ Charles Finley (Republican) 75.99%; ▌M. B. Sewell (Democratic) 24.01%
New York 18	John F. Carew	Democratic	1912	Incumbent resigned December 28, 1929, after being appointed to the New York Supreme Court. New member elected April 11, 1930. Democratic hold.	▌ ✓ Martin J. Kennedy (Democratic) 80.54%; ▌Bernard Katzen (Republican) 17.54%; ▌August Claessens (Socialist) 1.92%
Texas 17	Robert Q. Lee	Democratic	1928	Incumbent died April 18, 1930. New member elected May 20, 1930. Democratic hold.	▌ ✓ Thomas L. Blanton (Democratic) 56.07%; ▌ Clara Edna Lee (Democratic) 43.93%
Arkansas 4	Otis Wingo	Democratic	1912	Incumbent died October 21, 1930. New member elected November 4, 1930 to finish her husband's term. Democratic hold.	▌ ✓ Effiegene Locke Wingo (Democratic); Uncontested
Connecticut 5	James P. Glynn	Republican	1914; 1922 (lost); 1924	Incumbent died March 6, 1930. New member elected November 4, 1930. Republican hold.	▌ ✓ Edward W. Goss (Republican) 50.61%; ▌Martin E. Gormley (Democratic) 49.39%
Illinois 15	Edward John King	Republican	1914	Incumbent died February 17, 1929. New member elected November 4, 1930. Republican hold.	▌ ✓ Burnett M. Chiperfield (Republican) 56.24%; ▌J. Hays Paxton (Democratic) 43.70%; ▌Lloyd Stevens (American National) 0.07%
Illinois 24	Thomas S. Williams	Republican	1914	Incumbent resigned November 11, 1929, after being appointed to the U.S. Court of Claims. New member elected November 4, 1930. Democratic gain.	▌ ✓ Claude V. Parsons (Democratic) 50.18%; ▌James V. Heidinger (Republican) 49.82%
Kentucky 2	David H. Kincheloe	Democratic	1914	Incumbent resigned October 5, 1930, after being appointed to the U.S. Customs Court. New member elected November 4, 1930. Democratic hold.	▌ ✓ John L. Dorsey Jr. (Democratic); Uncontested
North Carolina 5	Charles M. Stedman	Democratic	1910	Incumbent died September 23, 1930. New member elected November 4, 1930. Democratic hold.	▌ ✓ Franklin W. Hancock Jr. (Democratic) 60.93%; ▌John F. Reynolds (Republican) 39.07%
North Carolina 7	William C. Hammer	Democratic	1920	Incumbent died September 26, 1930. New member elected November 4, 1930. Democratic hold.	▌ ✓ Hinton James (Democratic) 59.04%; ▌Colin G. Spencer (Republican) 40.96%
Pennsylvania 16	Stephen G. Porter	Republican	1910	Incumbent died June 27, 1930. New member elected November 4, 1930. Republican hold.	▌ ✓ Robert F. Rich (Republican) 99.56%; ▌J. Drew Fague (Democratic) 0.44%
Pennsylvania 32	Edgar R. Kiess	Republican	1912	Incumbent died July 20, 1930. New member elected November 4, 1930. Republican hold.	▌ ✓ Edmund F. Erk (Republican) #; Uncontested
Rhode Island 3	Jeremiah E. O'Connell	Democratic	1922; 1926 (Lost); 1928	Incumbent resigned to become Associate Justice of Rhode Island Superior Court. New member elected November 4, 1930. Democratic hold. Winner was also elected to the next term; see below.	▌ ✓ Francis Condon (Democratic) 56.54%; ▌William R. Martin (Republican) 43.46%
Utah 2	Elmer O. Leatherwood	Republican	1920	Incumbent died December 24, 1929. New member elected November 4, 1930. Republican hold. Winner also elected to the next term; see below.	▌ ✓ Frederick C. Loofbourow (Republican) 44.13%; ▌Joshua H. Paul (Democratic) 42.34%; ▌George N. Lawrence (Liberty) 13.22%; ▌Otto E. Parsons (Socialist) 0.32%
West Virginia 4	James A. Hughes	Republican	1900; 1914 (retired); 1926	Incumbent died March 2, 1930. New member elected November 4, 1930. Republican hold.	▌ ✓ Robert L. Hogg (Republican) 53.77%; ▌Mary M. Johnson (Democratic) 46.23%
Wisconsin 6	Florian Lampert	Republican	1918 (special)	Incumbent died July 18, 1930. New member elected November 4, 1930. Democratic gain. Winner also elected to the next term; see below.	▌ ✓ Michael Reilly (Democratic) 50.56%; ▌Philip Lehner (Republican) 49.41%; ▌Leonard L. Gudex (Socialist) 0.03%

== Alabama ==
District	Incumbent			This race	
District	Member	Party	First elected	Results	Candidates
Alabama 1	John McDuffie	Democratic	1918	Incumbent re-elected.	▌ ✓ John McDuffie (Democratic); Uncontested
Alabama 2	J. Lister Hill	Democratic	1923 (special)	Incumbent re-elected.	▌ ✓ J. Lister Hill (Democratic); Uncontested
Alabama 3	Henry B. Steagall	Democratic	1914	Incumbent re-elected.	▌ ✓ Henry B. Steagall (Democratic); Uncontested
Alabama 4	Lamar Jeffers	Democratic	1921 (special)	Incumbent re-elected.	▌ ✓ Lamar Jeffers (Democratic) 68.5%; ▌E. D. Banks (Republican) 31.5%
Alabama 5	LaFayette L. Patterson	Democratic	1928	Incumbent re-elected.	▌ ✓ LaFayette L. Patterson (Democratic); Uncontested
Alabama 6	William B. Oliver	Democratic	1914	Incumbent re-elected.	▌ ✓ William B. Oliver (Democratic); Uncontested
Alabama 7	Miles C. Allgood	Democratic	1922	Incumbent re-elected.	▌ ✓ Miles C. Allgood (Democratic) 61.1%; ▌John B. Isbell (Republican) 38.9%
Alabama 8	Edward B. Almon	Democratic	1914	Incumbent re-elected.	▌ ✓ Edward B. Almon (Democratic); Uncontested
Alabama 9	George Huddleston	Democratic	1914	Incumbent re-elected.	▌ ✓ George Huddleston (Democratic) 81.0%; ▌Hollis B. Parrish (Republican) 19.0%
Alabama 10	William B. Bankhead	Democratic	1916	Incumbent re-elected.	▌ ✓ William B. Bankhead (Democratic) 64.2%; ▌Charles P. Lunsford (Republican) 35.8%

== Arizona ==
Results by county Douglas: 100%

District	Incumbent			This race	
District	Member	Party	First elected	Results	Candidates
Arizona at-large	Lewis W. Douglas	Democratic	1926	Incumbent re-elected.	▌ ✓ Lewis W. Douglas (Democratic); Uncontested

== Arkansas ==
District	Incumbent			This race	
District	Member	Party	First elected	Results	Candidates
Arkansas 1	William J. Driver	Democratic	1920	Incumbent re-elected.	▌ ✓ William J. Driver (Democratic); Uncontested
Arkansas 2	Pearl Peden Oldfield	Democratic	1929	Incumbent retired. Democratic hold.	▌ ✓ John E. Miller (Democratic); Uncontested
Arkansas 3	Claude Fuller	Democratic	1928	Incumbent re-elected.	▌ ✓ Claude Fuller (Democratic); Uncontested
Arkansas 4	Otis Wingo	Democratic	1912	Incumbent died. Democratic hold.	▌ ✓ Effiegene Locke Wingo (Democratic); Uncontested
Arkansas 5	Heartsill Ragon	Democratic	1922	Incumbent re-elected.	▌ ✓ Heartsill Ragon (Democratic); Uncontested
Arkansas 6	David Delano Glover	Democratic	1928	Incumbent re-elected.	▌ ✓ David Delano Glover (Democratic); Uncontested
Arkansas 7	Tilman B. Parks	Democratic	1920	Incumbent re-elected.	▌ ✓ Tilman B. Parks (Democratic); Uncontested

== California ==
District	Incumbent			This race	
District	Member	Party	First elected	Results	Candidates
California 1	Clarence F. Lea	Democratic	1916	Incumbent re-elected.	▌ ✓ Clarence F. Lea (Democratic); Uncontested
California 2	Harry Lane Englebright	Republican	1926	Incumbent re-elected.	▌ ✓ Harry Lane Englebright (Republican); Uncontested
California 3	Charles F. Curry	Republican	1912	Incumbent died. Republican hold.	▌ ✓ Charles F. Curry Jr. (R-W/I) 53.4%; ▌J. M. Inman (Republican) 33.0%; ▌Frank H. Buck (Democratic) 11.3%; ▌Katherine Braddock (Independent) 2.2%; ▌E. M. Turner (Independent) 0.1%
California 4	Florence Prag Kahn	Republican	1925	Incumbent re-elected.	▌ ✓ Florence Prag Kahn (Republican); Uncontested
California 5	Richard J. Welch	Republican	1926	Incumbent re-elected.	▌ ✓ Richard J. Welch (Republican); Uncontested
California 6	Albert E. Carter	Republican	1924	Incumbent re-elected.	▌ ✓ Albert E. Carter (Republican); Uncontested
California 7	Henry E. Barbour	Republican	1918	Incumbent re-elected.	▌ ✓ Henry E. Barbour (Republican); Uncontested
California 8	Arthur M. Free	Republican	1920	Incumbent re-elected.	▌ ✓ Arthur M. Free (Republican); Uncontested
California 9	William E. Evans	Republican	1926	Incumbent re-elected.	▌ ✓ William E. Evans (Republican); Uncontested
California 10	Joe Crail	Republican	1926	Incumbent re-elected.	▌ ✓ Joe Crail (Republican) 75.0%; ▌John F. Dockweiler (Democratic) 25.0%
California 11	Philip D. Swing	Republican	1920	Incumbent re-elected.	▌ ✓ Philip D. Swing (Republican); Uncontested

== Colorado ==
District	Incumbent			This race	
District	Member	Party	First elected	Results	Candidates
Colorado 1	William R. Eaton	Republican	1928	Incumbent re-elected.	▌ ✓ William R. Eaton (Republican) 50.3%; ▌Lawrence Lewis (Democratic) 48.1%; ▌W. R. Duke (Farmer–Labor) 1.0%; ▌Louis A. Zetlin (Communist) 0.5%
Colorado 2	Charles B. Timberlake	Republican	1914	Incumbent re-elected.	▌ ✓ Charles B. Timberlake (Republican) 59.3%; ▌O. E. Webb (Democratic) 40.7%
Colorado 3	Guy U. Hardy	Republican	1918	Incumbent re-elected.	▌ ✓ Guy U. Hardy (Republican) 60.7%; ▌Guy M. Weybright (Democratic) 39.3%
Colorado 4	Edward T. Taylor	Democratic	1908	Incumbent re-elected.	▌ ✓ Edward T. Taylor (Democratic) 66.9%; ▌Webster S. Whinnery (Republican) 33.1%

== Connecticut ==
District	Incumbent			This race	
District	Member	Party	First elected	Results	Candidates
Connecticut 1	E. Hart Fenn	Republican	1920	Incumbent retired. Democratic gain.	▌ ✓ Augustine Lonergan (Democratic) 50.3%; ▌Clarence W. Seymour (Republican) 49.7%
Connecticut 2	Richard P. Freeman	Republican	1914	Incumbent re-elected.	▌ ✓ Richard P. Freeman (Republican) 53.4%; ▌William C. Fox (Democratic) 46.6%
Connecticut 3	John Q. Tilson	Republican	1914	Incumbent re-elected.	▌ ✓ John Q. Tilson (Republican) 52.1%; ▌James A. Shanley (Democratic) 46.3%; ▌Davis (Socialist) 1.3%; ▌Schlossberg (Communist) 0.3%
Connecticut 4	Schuyler Merritt	Republican	1916	Incumbent lost re-election. Democratic gain.	▌ ✓ William L. Tierney (Democratic) 49.7%; ▌Schuyler Merritt (Republican) 48.2%; ▌George R. Moffatt (Socialist) 1.8%; ▌Mrasco (Communist) 0.4%
Connecticut 5	James P. Glynn	Republican	1924	Incumbent died. Republican hold.	▌ ✓ Edward W. Goss (Republican) 50.5%; ▌Martin E. Gormley (Democratic) 49.5%

== Delaware ==
District	Incumbent			This race	
District	Member	Party	First elected	Results	Candidates
Delaware at-large	Robert G. Houston	Republican	1924	Incumbent re-elected.	▌ ✓ Robert G. Houston (Republican) 55.7%; ▌John P. Le Fevre (Democratic) 44.1%; ▌Arnold Williams (Independent) 0.1%

== Florida ==
District	Incumbent			This race	
District	Member	Party	First elected	Results	Candidates
Florida 1	Herbert J. Drane	Democratic	1916	Incumbent re-elected.	▌ ✓ Herbert J. Drane (Democratic) 67.7%; ▌L. E. Womack (Republican) 32.3%
Florida 2	Robert A. Green	Democratic	1924	Incumbent re-elected.	▌ ✓ Robert A. Green (Democratic); Uncontested
Florida 3	Tom Yon	Democratic	1926	Incumbent re-elected.	▌ ✓ Tom Yon (Democratic); Uncontested
Florida 4	Ruth Bryan Owen	Democratic	1928	Incumbent re-elected.	▌ ✓ Ruth Bryan Owen (Democratic); Uncontested

== Georgia ==
District	Incumbent			This race	
District	Member	Party	First elected	Results	Candidates
Georgia 1	Charles Gordon Edwards	Democratic	1924	Incumbent re-elected.	▌ ✓ Charles Gordon Edwards (Democratic); Uncontested
Georgia 2	Edward E. Cox	Democratic	1924	Incumbent re-elected.	▌ ✓ Edward E. Cox (Democratic); Uncontested
Georgia 3	Charles R. Crisp	Democratic	1912	Incumbent re-elected.	▌ ✓ Charles R. Crisp (Democratic); Uncontested
Georgia 4	William C. Wright	Democratic	1918	Incumbent re-elected.	▌ ✓ William C. Wright (Democratic); Uncontested
Georgia 5	Robert Ramspeck	Democratic	1929	Incumbent re-elected.	▌ ✓ Robert Ramspeck (Democratic); Uncontested
Georgia 6	Samuel Rutherford	Democratic	1924	Incumbent re-elected.	▌ ✓ Samuel Rutherford (Democratic); Uncontested
Georgia 7	Malcolm C. Tarver	Democratic	1926	Incumbent re-elected.	▌ ✓ Malcolm C. Tarver (Democratic); Uncontested
Georgia 8	Charles H. Brand	Democratic	1916	Incumbent re-elected.	▌ ✓ Charles H. Brand (Democratic) 93.2%; ▌W. N. Philips (Independent) 6.8%
Georgia 9	Thomas Montgomery Bell	Democratic	1904	Incumbent lost renomination. Democratic hold.	▌ ✓ John S. Wood (Democratic); Unconstested
Georgia 10	Carl Vinson	Democratic	1914	Incumbent re-elected.	▌ ✓ Carl Vinson (Democratic); Uncontested
Georgia 11	William C. Lankford	Democratic	1918	Incumbent re-elected.	▌ ✓ William C. Lankford (Democratic) 81.8%; ▌Henry J. Carswell (Republican) 18.2%
Georgia 12	William W. Larsen	Democratic	1916	Incumbent re-elected.	▌ ✓ William W. Larsen (Democratic); Uncontested

== Idaho ==
District	Incumbent			This race	
District	Member	Party	First elected	Results	Candidates
Idaho 1	Burton L. French	Republican	1916	Incumbent re-elected.	▌ ✓ Burton L. French (Republican) 64.9%; ▌Compton I. White (Democratic) 35.1%
Idaho 2	Addison T. Smith	Republican	1912	Incumbent re-elected.	▌ ✓ Addison T. Smith (Republican) 63.2%; ▌W. F. Alworth (Democratic) 36.8%

== Illinois ==
District	Incumbent			This race	
District	Member	Party	First elected	Results	Candidates
Illinois 1	Oscar Stanton De Priest	Republican	1928	Incumbent re-elected.	▌ ✓ Oscar Stanton De Priest (Republican) 58.4%; ▌Harry Baker (Democratic) 41.2%
Illinois 2	Morton D. Hull	Republican	1923	Incumbent re-elected.	▌ ✓ Morton D. Hull (Republican) 54.3%; ▌Michael C. Walsh (Democratic) 44.9%
Illinois 3	Elliott W. Sproul	Republican	1920	Incumbent lost re-election. Democratic gain.	▌ ✓ Edward A. Kelly (Democratic) 58.1%; ▌Elliott W. Sproul (Republican) 41.8%
Illinois 4	Thomas A. Doyle	Democratic	1923	Incumbent retired. Democratic hold.	▌ ✓ Harry P. Beam (Democratic) 69.3%; ▌Frank G. Zelezinski (Republican) 30.5%
Illinois 5	Adolph J. Sabath	Democratic	1906	Incumbent re-elected.	▌ ✓ Adolph J. Sabath (Democratic) 66.1%; ▌Frank V. Kara (Republican) 33.3%
Illinois 6	James T. Igoe	Democratic	1926	Incumbent re-elected.	▌ ✓ James T. Igoe (Democratic) 66.7%; ▌Henry R. Lundblad (Republican) 32.7%
Illinois 7	M. Alfred Michaelson	Republican	1920	Incumbent lost renomination. Democratic gain.	▌ ✓ Leonard W. Schuetz (Democratic) 54.5%; ▌James C. Moreland (Republican) 44.4%
Illinois 8	Stanley H. Kunz	Democratic	1920	Incumbent lost re-election. Republican gain.	▌ ✓ Peter C. Granata (Republican) 51.8%; ▌Stanley H. Kunz (Democratic) 48.1%
Illinois 9	Frederick A. Britten	Republican	1912	Incumbent re-elected.	▌ ✓ Frederick A. Britten (Republican) 99.4%
Illinois 10	Carl R. Chindblom	Republican	1918	Incumbent re-elected.	▌ ✓ Carl R. Chindblom (Republican) 50.8%; ▌John E. Hesse (Democratic) 49.1%; ▌C. Emil Leidberg (American) 0.09%
Illinois 11	Frank R. Reid	Republican	1922	Incumbent re-elected.	▌ ✓ Frank R. Reid (Republican) 63.1%; ▌Elmer P. Schaefer (Democratic) 36.8%; ▌Walter F. Benn (American) 0.1%
Illinois 12	John T. Buckbee	Republican	1926	Incumbent re-elected.	▌ ✓ John T. Buckbee (Republican) 76.1%; ▌Richard J. O'Halloran (Democratic) 23.9%
Illinois 13	William Richard Johnson	Republican	1924	Incumbent re-elected.	▌ ✓ William Richard Johnson (Republican) 70.2%; ▌John A. Ascher (Democratic) 29.8%
Illinois 14	John Clayton Allen	Republican	1924	Incumbent re-elected.	▌ ✓ John Clayton Allen (Republican) 56.9%; ▌William H. Hartzell (Democratic) 43.1%
Illinois 15	Edward John King	Republican	1914	Incumbent died. Republican hold.	▌ ✓ Burnett M. Chiperfield (Republican) 56.5%; ▌J. Hays Paxton (Democratic) 43.5%
Illinois 16	William E. Hull	Republican	1922	Incumbent re-elected.	▌ ✓ William E. Hull (Republican) 52.8%; ▌Edwin S. Carr (Democratic) 47.2%
Illinois 17	Homer W. Hall	Republican	1926	Incumbent re-elected.	▌ ✓ Homer W. Hall (Republican) 58.4%; ▌C. S. Schneider (Democratic) 41.6%
Illinois 18	William P. Holaday	Republican	1922	Incumbent re-elected.	▌ ✓ William P. Holaday (Republican) 56.8%; ▌Charles R. Hill (Democratic) 43.2%
Illinois 19	Charles Adkins	Republican	1924	Incumbent re-elected.	▌ ✓ Charles Adkins (Republican) 55.4%; ▌Charles M. Borchers (Democratic) 44.6%
Illinois 20	Henry T. Rainey	Democratic	1922	Incumbent re-elected.	▌ ✓ Henry T. Rainey (Democratic) 64.9%; ▌William J. Thornton (Republican) 35.1%
Illinois 21	Frank M. Ramey	Republican	1928	Incumbent retired. Democratic gain.	▌ ✓ J. Earl Major (Democratic) 57.1%; ▌Roger E. Chapin (Republican) 42.8%
Illinois 22	Edward M. Irwin	Republican	1924	Incumbent lost re-election. Democratic gain.	▌ ✓ Charles A. Karch (Democratic) 50.3%; ▌Edward M. Irwin (Republican) 49.7%
Illinois 23	William W. Arnold	Democratic	1922	Incumbent re-elected.	▌ ✓ William W. Arnold (Democratic) 62.6%; ▌Joe Frank Allen (Republican) 37.4%
Illinois 24	Thomas Sutler Williams	Republican	1914	Incumbent resigned to become a judge. Democratic gain.	▌ ✓ Claude V. Parsons (Democratic) 50.0%; ▌James V. Heidinger (Republican) 50.0%
Illinois 25	Edward E. Denison	Republican	1914	Incumbent lost re-election. Democratic gain.	▌ ✓ Kent E. Keller (Democratic) 52.6%; ▌Edward E. Denison (Republican) 47.4%
Illinois at-large 2 seats on a general ticket	Richard Yates Jr.	Republican	1918	Incumbent re-elected.	▌ ✓ William H. Dieterich (Democratic) 27.0%; ▌ ✓ Richard Yates Jr. (Republican) 25.1%; ▌Walter Nesbit (Democratic) 24.7%; ▌Frank L. Smith (Republican) 22.6%; ▌Emil Z. Levitin (Socialist) 0.2%; ▌Morris A. Gold (Socialist) 0.2%; ▌William S. Feinberg (American) 0.03%; ▌John W. McLain (American) 0.03%; ▌I. J. Brown (Liberty) 0.02%; ▌Charles A. Reinhart (Liberty) 0.02%
Illinois at-large 2 seats on a general ticket	Ruth Hanna McCormick	Republican	1922	Incumbent retired to run for U.S. Senator. Democratic gain.	▌ ✓ William H. Dieterich (Democratic) 27.0%; ▌ ✓ Richard Yates Jr. (Republican) 25.1%; ▌Walter Nesbit (Democratic) 24.7%; ▌Frank L. Smith (Republican) 22.6%; ▌Emil Z. Levitin (Socialist) 0.2%; ▌Morris A. Gold (Socialist) 0.2%; ▌William S. Feinberg (American) 0.03%; ▌John W. McLain (American) 0.03%; ▌I. J. Brown (Liberty) 0.02%; ▌Charles A. Reinhart (Liberty) 0.02%

== Indiana ==
District	Incumbent			This race	
District	Member	Party	First elected	Results	Candidates
Indiana 1	Harry E. Rowbottom	Republican	1924	Incumbent lost re-election. Democratic gain.	▌ ✓ John W. Boehne Jr. (Democratic) 53.9%; ▌Harry E. Rowbottom (Republican) 46.1%
Indiana 2	Arthur H. Greenwood	Democratic	1922	Incumbent re-elected.	▌ ✓ Arthur H. Greenwood (Democratic) 59.5%; ▌Ray S. Sisson (Republican) 40.5%
Indiana 3	James W. Dunbar	Republican	1928	Incumbent lost re-election. Democratic gain.	▌ ✓ Eugene B. Crowe (Democratic) 50.1%; ▌James W. Dunbar (Republican) 49.9%
Indiana 4	Harry C. Canfield	Democratic	1922	Incumbent re-elected.	▌ ✓ Harry C. Canfield (Democratic) 57.1%; ▌Scott Thompson (Republican) 42.9%
Indiana 5	Noble J. Johnson	Republican	1924	Incumbent lost re-election. Democratic gain.	▌ ✓ Courtland C. Gillen (Democratic) 51.4%; ▌Noble J. Johnson (Republican) 48.6%
Indiana 6	Richard N. Elliott	Republican	1918	Incumbent lost re-election. Democratic gain.	▌ ✓ William H. Larrabee (Democratic) 51.8%; ▌Richard N. Elliott (Republican) 48.2%
Indiana 7	Louis Ludlow	Democratic	1928	Incumbent re-elected.	▌ ✓ Louis Ludlow (Democratic) 61.7%; ▌Archibald M. Hall (Republican) 37.8%; ▌William O. Fogleson (Socialist) 0.4%
Indiana 8	Albert H. Vestal	Republican	1916	Incumbent re-elected.	▌ ✓ Albert H. Vestal (Republican) 50.0%; ▌Claude C. Ball (Democratic) 50.0%
Indiana 9	Fred S. Purnell	Republican	1916	Incumbent re-elected.	▌ ✓ Fred S. Purnell (Republican) 50.2%; ▌Harry L. Matlock (Democratic) 49.8%
Indiana 10	William R. Wood	Republican	1914	Incumbent re-elected.	▌ ✓ William R. Wood (Republican) 53.3%; ▌Charles J. Murphy (Democratic) 46.7%
Indiana 11	Albert R. Hall	Republican	1924	Incumbent lost re-election. Democratic gain.	▌ ✓ Glenn Griswold (Democratic) 51.3%; ▌Albert R. Hall (Republican) 48.7%
Indiana 12	David Hogg	Republican	1924	Incumbent re-elected.	▌ ✓ David Hogg (Republican) 52.3%; ▌Thomas P. Riddle (Democratic) 47.7%
Indiana 13	Andrew J. Hickey	Republican	1918	Incumbent lost re-election. Democratic gain.	▌ ✓ Samuel B. Pettengill (Democratic) 51.3%; ▌Andrew J. Hickey (Republican) 48.7%

== Iowa ==
District	Incumbent			This race	
District	Member	Party	First elected	Results	Candidates
Iowa 1	William F. Kopp	Republican	1920	Incumbent re-elected.	▌ ✓ William F. Kopp (Republican) 63.3%; ▌Max A. Conrad (Democratic) 36.4%; ▌Louis J. Kehoe (Independent) 0.3%
Iowa 2	F. Dickinson Letts	Republican	1924	Incumbent lost re-election. Democratic gain.	▌ ✓ Bernhard M. Jacobsen (Democratic) 55.4%; ▌F. Dickinson Letts (Republican) 44.6%
Iowa 3	Thomas J. B. Robinson	Republican	1922	Incumbent re-elected.	▌ ✓ Thomas J. B. Robinson (Republican) 63.0%; ▌W. L. Beecher (Democratic) 37.0%
Iowa 4	Gilbert N. Haugen	Republican	1898	Incumbent re-elected.	▌ ✓ Gilbert N. Haugen (Republican) 59.1%; ▌Wilbur L. Peck (Democratic) 40.9%
Iowa 5	Cyrenus Cole	Republican	1921	Incumbent re-elected.	▌ ✓ Cyrenus Cole (Republican) 53.8%; ▌H. M. Cooper (Democratic) 46.2%
Iowa 6	C. William Ramseyer	Republican	1914	Incumbent re-elected.	▌ ✓ C. William Ramseyer (Republican) 60.6%; ▌S. F. McConnell (Democratic) 39.4%
Iowa 7	Cassius C. Dowell	Republican	1914	Incumbent re-elected.	▌ ✓ Cassius C. Dowell (Republican) 76.4%; ▌Carl Evans (Democratic) 23.6%
Iowa 8	Lloyd Thurston	Republican	1924	Incumbent re-elected.	▌ ✓ Lloyd Thurston (Republican) 51.5%; ▌James Pearson (Democratic) 48.5%
Iowa 9	Charles Edward Swanson	Republican	1928	Incumbent re-elected.	▌ ✓ Charles Edward Swanson (Republican) 57.1%; ▌June M. Fickel (Democratic) 42.2%; ▌Carl C. Carlsen (Independent) 0.7%
Iowa 10	Lester J. Dickinson	Republican	1918	Incumbent retired to run for U.S. Senator. Republican hold.	▌ ✓ Fred C. Gilchrist (Republican) 66.1%; ▌Paul Anderson (Democratic) 33.2%; ▌A. L. Moen (Independent) 0.7%
Iowa 11	Ed H. Campbell	Republican	1928	Incumbent re-elected.	▌ ✓ Ed H. Campbell (Republican) 73.8%; ▌Fordyce W. Bisbee (Democratic) 26.2%

== Kansas ==
District	Incumbent			This race	
District	Member	Party	First elected	Results	Candidates
Kansas 1	William P. Lambertson	Republican	1928	Incumbent re-elected.	▌ ✓ William P. Lambertson (Republican); Uncontested
Kansas 2	Ulysses Samuel Guyer	Republican	1926	Incumbent re-elected.	▌ ✓ Ulysses Samuel Guyer (Republican) 56.7%; ▌Chauncey B. Little (Democratic) 43.3%
Kansas 3	William H. Sproul	Republican	1922	Incumbent retired to run for U.S. Senator. Republican hold.	▌ ✓ Harold C. McGugin (Republican) 52.7%; ▌Earl Knight (Democratic) 47.3%
Kansas 4	Homer Hoch	Republican	1918	Incumbent re-elected.	▌ ✓ Homer Hoch (Republican) 58.4%; ▌James E. Hilkey (Democratic) 41.6%
Kansas 5	James G. Strong	Republican	1918	Incumbent re-elected.	▌ ✓ James G. Strong (Republican) 53.9%; ▌Clyde Short (Democratic) 46.1%
Kansas 6	Charles I. Sparks	Republican	1928	Incumbent re-elected.	▌ ✓ Charles I. Sparks (Republican) 61.6%; ▌Robert Good (Democratic) 38.4%
Kansas 7	Clifford R. Hope	Republican	1926	Incumbent re-elected.	▌ ✓ Clifford R. Hope (Republican) 61.1%; ▌A. S. Allphin (Democratic) 38.9%
Kansas 8	William Augustus Ayres	Democratic	1922	Incumbent re-elected.	▌ ✓ William Augustus Ayres (Democratic) 74.7%; ▌Stella B. Haines (Republican) 25.3%

== Kentucky ==
District	Incumbent			This race	
District	Member	Party	First elected	Results	Candidates
Kentucky 1	William Voris Gregory	Democratic	1926	Incumbent re-elected.	▌ ✓ William Voris Gregory (Democratic); Uncontested
Kentucky 2	David Hayes Kincheloe	Democratic	1914	Incumbent resigned to become a judge. Democratic hold.	▌ ✓ Glover H. Cary (Democratic); Uncontested
Kentucky 3	John William Moore	Democratic	1929	Incumbent re-elected.	▌ ✓ John William Moore (Democratic) 99.7%; ▌Fred Jones (Independent) 0.3%
Kentucky 4	John D. Craddock	Republican	1928	Incumbent lost re-election. Democratic gain.	▌ ✓ Cap R. Carden (Democratic) 52.3%; ▌John D. Craddock (Republican) 47.7%
Kentucky 5	Maurice Thatcher	Republican	1922	Incumbent re-elected.	▌ ✓ Maurice Thatcher (Republican) 97.9%; ▌Charles W. Marrett (Socialist Labor) 2.1%
Kentucky 6	J. Lincoln Newhall	Republican	1928	Incumbent lost re-election. Democratic gain.	▌ ✓ Brent Spence (Democratic) 56.9%; ▌J. Lincoln Newhall (Republican) 34.1%; ▌Blaine McLaughlin (Independent) 8.6%; ▌John J. Thobe (Socialist) 0.4%
Kentucky 7	Robert Blackburn	Republican	1928	Incumbent lost re-election. Democratic gain.	▌ ✓ Virgil Chapman (Democratic) 57.8%; ▌Robert Blackburn (Republican) 42.2%
Kentucky 8	Lewis L. Walker	Republican	1928	Incumbent lost re-election. Democratic gain.	▌ ✓ Ralph W. E. Gilbert (Democratic) 57.5%; ▌Lewis L. Walker (Republican) 42.5%
Kentucky 9	Elva R. Kendall	Republican	1928	Incumbent lost re-election. Democratic gain.	▌ ✓ Fred M. Vinson (Democratic) 59.7%; ▌Elva R. Kendall (Republican) 40.3%
Kentucky 10	Katherine Langley	Republican	1926	Incumbent lost re-election. Democratic gain.	▌ ✓ Andrew J. May (Democratic) 52.9%; ▌Katherine Langley (Republican) 47.1%
Kentucky 11	Charles Finley	Republican	1930	Incumbent re-elected.	▌ ✓ Charles Finley (Republican) 66.3%; ▌Will Ward Duffield (Democratic) 33.7%

== Louisiana ==
District	Incumbent			This race	
District	Member	Party	First elected	Results	Candidates
Louisiana 1	James O'Connor	Democratic	1918	Incumbent lost renomination. Democratic hold.	▌ ✓ Joachim O. Fernández (Democratic) 95.8%; ▌John B. Murphy (Republican) 4.2%
Louisiana 2	James Z. Spearing	Democratic	1924	Incumbent lost renomination. Democratic hold.	▌ ✓ Paul H. Maloney (Democratic) 97.2%; ▌Henry J. Veith (Republican) 2.8%
Louisiana 3	Numa F. Montet	Democratic	1929	Incumbent re-elected.	▌ ✓ Numa F. Montet (Democratic); Uncontested
Louisiana 4	John N. Sandlin	Democratic	1920	Incumbent re-elected.	▌ ✓ John N. Sandlin (Democratic); Uncontested
Louisiana 5	Riley J. Wilson	Democratic	1914	Incumbent re-elected.	▌ ✓ Riley J. Wilson (Democratic); Uncontested
Louisiana 6	Bolivar E. Kemp	Democratic	1924	Incumbent re-elected.	▌ ✓ Bolivar E. Kemp (Democratic); Uncontested
Louisiana 7	René L. De Rouen	Democratic	1927	Incumbent re-elected.	▌ ✓ René L. De Rouen (Democratic); Uncontested
Louisiana 8	James Benjamin Aswell	Democratic	1912	Incumbent re-elected.	▌ ✓ James Benjamin Aswell (Democratic); Uncontested

== Maine ==
District	Incumbent			This race	
District	Member	Party	First elected	Results	Candidates
Maine 1	Carroll L. Beedy	Republican	1920	Incumbent re-elected.	▌ ✓ Carroll L. Beedy (Republican) 61.4%; ▌Thomas F. Locke (Democratic) 38.6%
Maine 2	Wallace H. White	Republican	1916	Incumbent retired to run for U.S. Senator. Republican hold.	▌ ✓ Donald B. Partridge (Republican) 56.2%; ▌Albert Beliveau (Democratic) 43.8%
Maine 3	John E. Nelson	Republican	1922	Incumbent re-elected.	▌ ✓ John E. Nelson (Republican) 64.3%; ▌Leo D. Lamond (Democratic) 35.7%
Maine 4	Donald F. Snow	Republican	1928	Incumbent re-elected.	▌ ✓ Donald F. Snow (Republican) 66.0%; ▌Clinton C. Stevens (Democratic) 34.0%

== Maryland ==
District	Incumbent			This race	
District	Member	Party	First elected	Results	Candidates
Maryland 1	T. Alan Goldsborough	Democratic	1920	Incumbent re-elected.	▌ ✓ T. Alan Goldsborough (Democratic) 57.3%; ▌A. Stengle Marine (Republican) 42.7%
Maryland 2	Linwood Clark	Republican	1928	Incumbent lost re-election. Democratic gain.	▌ ✓ William P. Cole Jr. (Democratic) 59.3%; ▌Linwood Clark (Republican) 40.7%
Maryland 3	Vincent L. Palmisano	Democratic	1926	Incumbent re-elected.	▌ ✓ Vincent L. Palmisano (Democratic) 53.4%; ▌John Philip Hill (Republican) 45.1%; ▌Samuel M. Neistadt (Socialist) 1.5%
Maryland 4	J. Charles Linthicum	Democratic	1910	Incumbent re-elected.	▌ ✓ J. Charles Linthicum (Democratic) 65.0%; ▌W. O. Atwood (Republican) 35.0%
Maryland 5	Stephen W. Gambrill	Democratic	1924	Incumbent re-elected.	▌ ✓ Stephen W. Gambrill (Democratic) 65.3%; ▌A. Kingsley Love (Republican) 34.7%
Maryland 6	Frederick N. Zihlman	Republican	1916	Incumbent lost re-election. Democratic gain.	▌ ✓ David J. Lewis (Democratic) 53.6%; ▌Frederick N. Zihlman (Republican) 46.4%

== Massachusetts ==
District	Incumbent			This race	
District	Member	Party	First elected	Results	Candidates
Massachusetts 1	Allen T. Treadway	Republican	1912	Incumbent re-elected.	▌ ✓ Allen T. Treadway (Republican) 54.9%; ▌Hugh McLean (Democratic) 45.1%
Massachusetts 2	William J. Granfield	Democratic	1930	Incumbent re-elected.	▌ ✓ William J. Granfield (Democratic) 55.5%; ▌Joshua L. Brooks (Republican) 44.5%
Massachusetts 3	Frank H. Foss	Republican	1924	Incumbent re-elected.	▌ ✓ Frank H. Foss (Republican) 57.1%; ▌Frank W. Barr (Democratic) 42.9%
Massachusetts 4	George R. Stobbs	Republican	1924	Incumbent retired. Republican hold.	▌ ✓ Pehr G. Holmes (Republican) 54.7%; ▌David Goldstein (Democratic) 45.3%
Massachusetts 5	Edith Nourse Rogers	Republican	1925	Incumbent re-elected.	▌ ✓ Edith Nourse Rogers (Republican) 66.3%; ▌Joseph M. Halloran (Democratic) 33.7%
Massachusetts 6	A. Piatt Andrew	Republican	1921	Incumbent re-elected.	▌ ✓ A. Piatt Andrew (Republican) 76.4%; ▌Charles D. Smith (Democratic) 23.6%
Massachusetts 7	William P. Connery Jr.	Democratic	1922	Incumbent re-elected.	▌ ✓ William P. Connery Jr. (Democratic) 67.6%; ▌Charles W. Lovett (Republican) 32.4%
Massachusetts 8	Frederick W. Dallinger	Republican	1926	Incumbent re-elected.	▌ ✓ Frederick W. Dallinger (Republican) 56.6%; ▌John P. Brennan (Democratic) 43.4%
Massachusetts 9	Charles L. Underhill	Republican	1920	Incumbent re-elected.	▌ ✓ Charles L. Underhill (Republican) 50.7%; ▌Joseph J. Borgatti (Democratic) 49.3%
Massachusetts 10	John J. Douglass	Democratic	1924	Incumbent re-elected.	▌ ✓ John J. Douglass (Democratic) 87.3%; ▌Edward L. Donnelly (Republican) 12.7%
Massachusetts 11	George H. Tinkham	Republican	1914	Incumbent re-elected.	▌ ✓ George H. Tinkham (Republican) 63.0%; ▌John J. Kelleher (Democratic) 37.0%
Massachusetts 12	John W. McCormack	Democratic	1928	Incumbent re-elected.	▌ ✓ John W. McCormack (Democratic) 76.7%; ▌Samuel Abrams (Republican) 23.3%
Massachusetts 13	Robert Luce	Republican	1918	Incumbent re-elected.	▌ ✓ Robert Luce (Republican) 55.9%; ▌Donald M. Hill (Democratic) 44.1%
Massachusetts 14	Richard B. Wigglesworth	Republican	1928	Incumbent re-elected.	▌ ✓ Richard B. Wigglesworth (Republican) 57.3%; ▌Edward G. Morris (Democratic) 42.7%
Massachusetts 15	Joseph W. Martin Jr.	Republican	1924	Incumbent re-elected.	▌ ✓ Joseph W. Martin Jr. (Republican) 64.1%; ▌William J. Murphy (Democratic) 35.9%
Massachusetts 16	Charles L. Gifford	Republican	1922	Incumbent re-elected.	▌ ✓ Charles L. Gifford (Republican) 69.6%; ▌John D. W. Bodfish (Democratic) 30.4%

== Michigan ==
District	Incumbent			This race	
District	Member	Party	First elected	Results	Candidates
Michigan 1	Robert H. Clancy	Republican	1926	Incumbent re-elected.	▌ ✓ Robert H. Clancy (Republican) 82.2%; ▌William M. Donnelly (Democratic) 16.3%; ▌Anthony Gerlach (Workers) 1.5%
Michigan 2	Earl C. Michener	Republican	1918	Incumbent re-elected.	▌ ✓ Earl C. Michener (Republican) 58.0%; ▌Edward Frensdorf (Democratic) 41.9%; ▌William Nowell (Workers) 0.1%
Michigan 3	Joseph L. Hooper	Republican	1925	Incumbent re-elected.	▌ ✓ Joseph L. Hooper (Republican) 71.1%; ▌Rosslyn L. Sowers (Democratic) 28.9%
Michigan 4	John C. Ketcham	Republican	1920	Incumbent re-elected.	▌ ✓ John C. Ketcham (Republican) 66.1%; ▌Roman I. Jarvis (Democratic) 33.9%
Michigan 5	Carl E. Mapes	Republican	1912	Incumbent re-elected.	▌ ✓ Carl E. Mapes (Republican) 98.7%; ▌Arnold Ziegler (Workers) 1.3%
Michigan 6	Grant M. Hudson	Republican	1922	Incumbent lost renomination. Republican hold.	▌ ✓ Seymour H. Person (Republican) 70.2%; ▌Patrick H. O'Brien (Democratic) 28.2%; ▌Philip Raymond (Workers) 0.9%; ▌Axel O. Londal (Socialist) 0.6%
Michigan 7	Louis C. Cramton	Republican	1912	Incumbent lost renomination. Republican hold.	▌ ✓ Jesse P. Wolcott (Republican) 94.3%; ▌Emerald B. Dixon (Democratic) 5.7%
Michigan 8	Bird J. Vincent	Republican	1922	Incumbent re-elected.	▌ ✓ Bird J. Vincent (Republican) 67.4%; ▌Michael J. Hart (Democratic) 32.6%
Michigan 9	James C. McLaughlin	Republican	1906	Incumbent re-elected.	▌ ✓ James C. McLaughlin (Republican) 75.0%; ▌Loren N. O'Brien (Democratic) 25.0%
Michigan 10	Roy O. Woodruff	Republican	1920	Incumbent re-elected.	▌ ✓ Roy O. Woodruff (Republican) 78.8%; ▌Henry C. Haller (Democratic) 21.2%
Michigan 11	Frank P. Bohn	Republican	1926	Incumbent re-elected.	▌ ✓ Frank P. Bohn (Republican) 100.0%
Michigan 12	W. Frank James	Republican	1914	Incumbent re-elected.	▌ ✓ W. Frank James (Republican) 98.1%; ▌Edwin Mutila (Socialist) 1.9%
Michigan 13	Clarence J. McLeod	Republican	1922	Incumbent re-elected.	▌ ✓ Clarence J. McLeod (Republican) 78.8%; ▌Walter I. McKenzie (Democratic) 19.3%; ▌Philip Bart (Workers) 1.1%; ▌Arthur Rubinstein (Socialist) 0.7%

== Minnesota ==
District	Incumbent			This race	
District	Member	Party	First elected	Results	Candidates
Minnesota 1	Victor Christgau	Republican	1928	Incumbent re-elected.	▌ ✓ Victor Christgau (Republican) 65.0%; ▌Matt Fitzpatrick (Farmer–Labor) 35.0%
Minnesota 2	Frank Clague	Republican	1920	Incumbent re-elected.	▌ ✓ Frank Clague (Republican) 53.7%; ▌Louis A. Fritsche (Farmer–Labor) 46.3%
Minnesota 3	August H. Andresen	Republican	1924	Incumbent re-elected.	▌ ✓ August H. Andresen (Republican) 48.0%; ▌Francis Shoemaker (Farmer–Labor) 28.4%; ▌Joseph J. Moriarity (Democratic) 23.5%
Minnesota 4	Melvin Maas	Republican	1926	Incumbent re-elected.	▌ ✓ Melvin Maas (Republican) 66.5%; ▌Claus V. Hammerstrom (Farmer–Labor) 22.1%; ▌Frank Munger (Democratic) 9.0%; ▌A. N. Anderson (Communist) 2.3%
Minnesota 5	William I. Nolan	Republican	1929	Incumbent re-elected.	▌ ✓ William I. Nolan (Republican) 61.3%; ▌Silas M. Bryan (Democratic) 35.6%; ▌Rebecca G. Reeve (Communist) 3.1%
Minnesota 6	Harold Knutson	Republican	1916	Incumbent re-elected.	▌ ✓ Harold Knutson (Republican) 60.6%; ▌John Knutsen (Farmer–Labor) 26.8%; ▌Patrick J. Russell (Democratic) 12.6%
Minnesota 7	Paul J. Kvale	Farmer–Labor	1929	Incumbent re-elected.	▌ ✓ Paul J. Kvale (Farmer–Labor) 81.2%; ▌Frank Hopkins (Republican) 18.8%
Minnesota 8	William A. Pittenger	Republican	1928	Incumbent re-elected.	▌ ✓ William A. Pittenger (Republican) 63.3%; ▌William L. Carss (Farmer–Labor) 32.9%; ▌Walter Harju (Communist) 3.8%
Minnesota 9	Conrad Selvig	Republican	1926	Incumbent re-elected.	▌ ✓ Conrad Selvig (Republican) 53.3%; ▌Knud Wefald (Farmer–Labor) 46.7%
Minnesota 10	Godfrey G. Goodwin	Republican	1924	Incumbent re-elected.	▌ ✓ Godfrey G. Goodwin (Republican) 49.5%; ▌Erling Swenson (Farmer–Labor) 48.0%; ▌David I. Moses (Communist) 2.5%

== Mississippi ==
District	Incumbent			This race	
District	Member	Party	First elected	Results	Candidates
Mississippi 1	John E. Rankin	Democratic	1920	Incumbent re-elected.	▌ ✓ John E. Rankin (Democratic); Uncontested
Mississippi 2	Wall Doxey	Democratic	1928	Incumbent re-elected.	▌ ✓ Wall Doxey (Democratic); Uncontested
Mississippi 3	William Madison Whittington	Democratic	1924	Incumbent re-elected.	▌ ✓ William Madison Whittington (Democratic); Uncontested
Mississippi 4	T. Jeff Busby	Democratic	1922	Incumbent re-elected.	▌ ✓ T. Jeff Busby (Democratic); Uncontested
Mississippi 5	Ross A. Collins	Democratic	1920	Incumbent re-elected.	▌ ✓ Ross A. Collins (Democratic); Uncontested
Mississippi 6	Robert S. Hall	Democratic	1928	Incumbent re-elected.	▌ ✓ Robert S. Hall (Democratic); Uncontested
Mississippi 7	Percy Quin	Democratic	1912	Incumbent re-elected.	▌ ✓ Percy Quin (Democratic); Uncontested
Mississippi 8	James W. Collier	Democratic	1908	Incumbent re-elected.	▌ ✓ James W. Collier (Democratic); Uncontested

== Missouri ==
District	Incumbent			This race	
District	Member	Party	First elected	Results	Candidates
Missouri 1	Milton A. Romjue	Democratic	1922	Incumbent re-elected.	▌ ✓ Milton A. Romjue (Democratic) 61.8%; ▌J. Frank Culler (Republican) 38.2%
Missouri 2	Ralph F. Lozier	Democratic	1922	Incumbent re-elected.	▌ ✓ Ralph F. Lozier (Democratic) 62.8%; ▌Pearl Gehrig (Republican) 37.1%; ▌Elias R. Anderson (Socialist) 0.1%
Missouri 3	Jacob L. Milligan	Democratic	1922	Incumbent re-elected.	▌ ✓ Jacob L. Milligan (Democratic) 58.9%; ▌H. F. Lawrence (Republican) 41.1%
Missouri 4	David W. Hopkins	Republican	1929	Incumbent re-elected.	▌ ✓ David W. Hopkins (Republican) 50.8%; ▌Romulus E. Culver (Democratic) 49.2%
Missouri 5	Edgar C. Ellis	Republican	1928	Incumbent lost re-election. Democratic gain.	▌ ✓ Joe Shannon (Democratic) 64.3%; ▌Edgar C. Ellis (Republican) 35.7%; ▌Joseph G. Hodges (Socialist) 0.07%
Missouri 6	Thomas Jefferson Halsey	Republican	1928	Incumbent lost re-election. Democratic gain.	▌ ✓ Clement C. Dickinson (Democratic) 54.9%; ▌Thomas Jefferson Halsey (Republican) 45.0%; ▌Charles H. Harrison (Socialist) 0.1%
Missouri 7	John William Palmer	Republican	1928	Incumbent lost re-election. Democratic gain.	▌ ✓ Samuel C. Major (Democratic) 51.8%; ▌John William Palmer (Republican) 48.2%
Missouri 8	William L. Nelson	Democratic	1924	Incumbent re-elected.	▌ ✓ William L. Nelson (Democratic) 57.9%; ▌E. J. Melton (Republican) 42.1%
Missouri 9	Clarence Cannon	Democratic	1922	Incumbent re-elected.	▌ ✓ Clarence Cannon (Democratic) 62.4%; ▌Frank H. Hollman (Republican) 37.4%; ▌Harry Shumaker (Socialist) 0.1%
Missouri 10	Henry F. Niedringhaus	Republican	1926	Incumbent re-elected.	▌ ✓ Henry F. Niedringhaus (Republican) 99.8%; ▌Theodore Baeff (Socialist Labor) 0.2%
Missouri 11	John J. Cochran	Democratic	1926	Incumbent re-elected.	▌ ✓ John J. Cochran (Democratic) 99.8%; ▌Joseph Spalti (Socialist Labor) 0.2%
Missouri 12	Leonidas C. Dyer	Republican	1914	Incumbent re-elected.	▌ ✓ Leonidas C. Dyer (Republican) 99.8%; ▌Charles Kuchan (Socialist Labor) 0.2%
Missouri 13	Charles Edward Kiefner	Republican	1928	Incumbent lost re-election. Democratic gain.	▌ ✓ Clyde Williams (Democratic) 53.1%; ▌Charles Edward Kiefner (Republican) 46.9%
Missouri 14	Dewey J. Short	Republican	1928	Incumbent lost re-election. Democratic gain.	▌ ✓ James F. Fulbright (Democratic) 51.6%; ▌Dewey J. Short (Republican) 48.4%
Missouri 15	Joe J. Manlove	Republican	1922	Incumbent re-elected.	▌ ✓ Joe J. Manlove (Republican) 57.8%; ▌Frank H. Lee (Democratic) 41.9%; ▌Alvin C. Elliff (Socialist) 0.3%
Missouri 16	Rowland Louis Johnston	Republican	1928	Incumbent lost re-election. Democratic gain.	▌ ✓ William Edward Barton (Democratic) 52.4%; ▌Rowland Louis Johnston (Republican) 47.6%

== Montana ==
District	Incumbent			This race	
District	Member	Party	First elected	Results	Candidates
Montana 1	John M. Evans	Democratic	1922	Incumbent re-elected.	▌ ✓ John M. Evans (Democratic) 56.1%; ▌Mark D. Fitzgerald (Republican) 42.6%; ▌J. P. Cavanaugh (Socialist) 0.8%; ▌Charles Squires (Farmer–Labor) 0.4%
Montana 2	Scott Leavitt	Republican	1922	Incumbent re-elected.	▌ ✓ Scott Leavitt (Republican) 52.8%; ▌Tom Stout (Democratic) 45.3%; ▌James Ostby (Farmer–Labor) 1.4%; ▌Jacob M. Kruse (Socialist) 0.3%; ▌Wayne La Grange (Communist) 0.2%

== Nebraska ==
District	Incumbent			This race	
District	Member	Party	First elected	Results	Candidates
Nebraska 1	John H. Morehead	Democratic	1922	Incumbent re-elected.	▌ ✓ John H. Morehead (Democratic) 63.9%; ▌Ralph S. Moseley (Republican) 36.1%
Nebraska 2	Willis G. Sears	Republican	1922	Incumbent lost renomination. Republican hold.	▌ ✓ Howard M. Baldrige (Republican) 50.6%; ▌Edward R. Burke (Democratic) 49.4%
Nebraska 3	Edgar Howard	Democratic	1922	Incumbent re-elected.	▌ ✓ Edgar Howard (Democratic) 69.3%; ▌H. Halderson (Republican) 30.7%
Nebraska 4	Charles H. Sloan	Republican	1928	Incumbent lost re-election. Democratic gain.	▌ ✓ John N. Norton (Democratic) 55.9%; ▌Charles H. Sloan (Republican) 44.1%
Nebraska 5	Fred G. Johnson	Republican	1928	Incumbent lost re-election. Democratic gain.	▌ ✓ Ashton C. Shallenberger (Democratic) 55.6%; ▌Fred G. Johnson (Republican) 44.4%
Nebraska 6	Robert G. Simmons	Republican	1922	Incumbent re-elected.	▌ ✓ Robert G. Simmons (Republican) 72.8%; ▌John McCoy (Democratic) 27.2%

== Nevada ==
District	Incumbent			This race	
District	Member	Party	First elected	Results	Candidates
Nevada at-large	Samuel S. Arentz	Republican	1924	Incumbent re-elected.	▌ ✓ Samuel S. Arentz (Republican) 54.4%; ▌Maurice J. Sullivan (Democratic) 45.6%

== New Hampshire ==
District	Incumbent			This race	
District	Member	Party	First elected	Results	Candidates
New Hampshire 1	Fletcher Hale	Republican	1924	Incumbent re-elected.	▌ ✓ Fletcher Hale (Republican) 56.1%; ▌Napoleon J. Dyer (Democratic) 43.9%
New Hampshire 2	Edward Hills Wason	Republican	1914	Incumbent re-elected.	▌ ✓ Edward Hills Wason (Republican) 59.7%; ▌Eaton D. Sargent (Democratic) 40.3%

== New Jersey ==
District	Incumbent			This race	
District	Member	Party	First elected	Results	Candidates
New Jersey 1	Charles A. Wolverton	Republican	1926	Incumbent re-elected.	▌ ✓ Charles A. Wolverton (Republican) 79.1%; ▌Francis G. Homan (Democratic) 19.8%; ▌Herman F. Niessner (Socialist) 1.0%; ▌William Hartman (Communist) 0.2%
New Jersey 2	Isaac Bacharach	Republican	1914	Incumbent re-elected.	▌ ✓ Isaac Bacharach (Republican) 79.7%; ▌Hans Froelicher Jr. (Democratic) 20.1%; ▌Florian Ambrosch (Communist) 0.2%
New Jersey 3	Harold G. Hoffman	Republican	1926	Incumbent retired to become state motor vehicle commissioner. Democratic gain.	▌ ✓ William H. Sutphin (Democratic) 51.1%; ▌Thomas M. Gopsill (Republican) 48.5%; ▌Raymond Dildine (Repeal Volstead Act) 0.2%; ▌Anthony German (Communist) 0.2%; ▌Louis W. Nimschke (Independent) 0.03%
New Jersey 4	Charles A. Eaton	Republican	1924	Incumbent re-elected.	▌ ✓ Charles A. Eaton (Republican) 57.6%; ▌Charles Browne (Democratic) 41.9%; ▌Joseph Winsiewski (Communist) 0.5%
New Jersey 5	Ernest R. Ackerman	Republican	1918	Incumbent re-elected.	▌ ✓ Ernest R. Ackerman (Republican) 65.3%; ▌Warren N. Gaffney (Democratic) 33.9%; ▌Harry L. Nelson (Socialist) 0.5%; ▌Morris Langler (Communist) 0.2%
New Jersey 6	Randolph Perkins	Republican	1920	Incumbent re-elected.	▌ ✓ Randolph Perkins (Republican) 56.5%; ▌Archibald C. Hart (Democratic) 42.8%; ▌Henry J. Cox (Socialist) 0.6%; ▌Charles Dzevetzko (Communist) 0.1%
New Jersey 7	George N. Seger	Republican	1922	Incumbent re-elected.	▌ ✓ George N. Seger (Republican) 53.7%; ▌Harry Joelson (Democratic) 45.0%; ▌J. Anthony Novak (Socialist) 0.6%; ▌Morris Kushinsky (Communist) 0.4%; ▌John C. Butterworth (Socialist Labor) 0.2%
New Jersey 8	Fred A. Hartley Jr.	Republican	1928	Incumbent re-elected.	▌ ✓ Fred A. Hartley Jr. (Republican) 50.4%; ▌Paul J. Moore (Democratic) 49.4%; ▌Albert Heder (Communist) 0.2%
New Jersey 9	Franklin W. Fort	Republican	1924	Incumbent retired to run for U.S. Senator. Republican hold.	▌ ✓ Peter Angelo Cavicchia (Republican) 53.8%; ▌Daniel F. Minahan (Democratic) 45.4%; ▌Harry J. Sutton (Socialist) 0.6%; ▌Domenick Fiaiani (Communist) 0.2%
New Jersey 10	Frederick R. Lehlbach	Republican	1914	Incumbent re-elected.	▌ ✓ Frederick R. Lehlbach (Republican) 66.6%; ▌Edward W. Simms (Democratic) 32.3%; ▌George Carey (Socialist) 0.8%; ▌Samuel D. Levine (Communist) 0.3%
New Jersey 11	Oscar L. Auf der Heide	Democratic	1924	Incumbent re-elected.	▌ ✓ Oscar L. Auf der Heide (Democratic) 73.0%; ▌Irving W. Taft (Republican) 26.3%; ▌Michael Rappoport (Socialist) 0.5%; ▌John Zatko (Communist) 0.2%; ▌Nicol Gerold (Socialist Labor) 0.08%
New Jersey 12	Mary Teresa Norton	Democratic	1924	Incumbent re-elected.	▌ ✓ Mary Teresa Norton (Democratic) 75.9%; ▌Douglas D. T. Story (Republican) 23.7%; ▌Archibald Craig (Socialist) 0.3%; ▌Nathaniel Honig (Communist) 0.09%

== New Mexico ==
District	Incumbent			This race	
District	Member	Party	First elected	Results	Candidates
New Mexico at-large	Albert G. Simms	Republican	1928	Incumbent lost re-election. Democratic gain.	▌ ✓ Dennis Chavez (Democratic) 55.7%; ▌Albert G. Simms (Republican) 44.1%; ▌John Whitley (Socialist) 0.3%

== New York ==
District	Incumbent			This race	
District	Member	Party	First elected	Results	Candidates
New York 1	Robert L. Bacon	Republican	1922	Incumbent re-elected.	▌ ✓ Robert L. Bacon (Republican) 58.4%; ▌James S. Shevlin (Democratic) 38.9%; ▌Sofus W. Christensen (Socialist) 2.7%
New York 2	William F. Brunner	Democratic	1928	Incumbent re-elected.	▌ ✓ William F. Brunner (Democratic) 67.5%; ▌James C. MacDevitt (Republican) 28.0%; ▌Tucker P. Smith (Socialist) 3.8%; ▌Harry A. Meyer (Communist) 0.7%
New York 3	George W. Lindsay	Democratic	1922	Incumbent re-elected.	▌ ✓ George W. Lindsay (Democratic) 75.1%; ▌James A. Campbell (Republican) 18.9%; ▌Joseph A. Weil (Socialist) 5.3%; ▌Fred Biedenkapp (Communist) 0.8%
New York 4	Thomas H. Cullen	Democratic	1918	Incumbent re-elected.	▌ ✓ Thomas H. Cullen (Democratic) 79.8%; ▌Charles A. Walter (Republican) 17.6%; ▌Abraman Zucker (Socialist) 2.3%; ▌Jack Johnstone (Communist) 0.3%
New York 5	Loring M. Black Jr.	Democratic	1922	Incumbent re-elected.	▌ ✓ Loring M. Black Jr. (Democratic) 63.4%; ▌Henry C. Reiners (Republican) 32.3%; ▌Joseph N. Cohen (Socialist) 4.3%
New York 6	Andrew Lawrence Somers	Democratic	1924	Incumbent re-elected.	▌ ✓ Andrew Lawrence Somers (Democratic) 47.0%; ▌Joseph G. Myerson (Republican) 30.1%; ▌Norman Thomas (Socialist) 22.1%; ▌Earl Browder (Communist) 0.8%
New York 7	John F. Quayle	Democratic	1922	Incumbent re-elected.	▌ ✓ John F. Quayle (Democratic) 65.0%; ▌Louis W. Arnold Jr. (Republican) 25.8%; ▌Benjamin Jackson (Socialist) 8.0%; ▌Clarence Hathaway (Communist) 1.2%
New York 8	Patrick J. Carley	Democratic	1926	Incumbent re-elected.	▌ ✓ Patrick J. Carley (Democratic) 57.1%; ▌Benjamin Ammerman (Republican) 26.0%; ▌Baruch C. Vladeck (Socialist) 16.9%
New York 9	David J. O'Connell	Democratic	1922	Incumbent re-elected.	▌ ✓ David J. O'Connell (Democratic) 58.9%; ▌William Koch (Republican) 34.0%; ▌Wilhemus B. Robinson (Socialist) 7.1%
New York 10	Emanuel Celler	Democratic	1922	Incumbent re-elected.	▌ ✓ Emanuel Celler (Democratic) 58.0%; ▌George J. Beldock (Republican) 28.2%; ▌Abraham I. Shiplacoff (Socialist) 12.4%; ▌Moissaye Joseph Olgin (Communist) 1.4%
New York 11	Anning S. Prall	Democratic	1923	Incumbent re-elected.	▌ ✓ Anning S. Prall (Democratic) 71.1%; ▌Wilbur F. Wakeman (Republican) 26.5%; ▌Walter H. Dearing (Socialist) 2.4%
New York 12	Samuel Dickstein	Democratic	1922	Incumbent re-elected.	▌ ✓ Samuel Dickstein (Democratic) 79.0%; ▌Gustave J. Landau (Republican) 14.7%; ▌Marx Lewis (Socialist) 5.2%; ▌Vern Smith (Communist) 1.1%
New York 13	Christopher D. Sullivan	Democratic	1916	Incumbent re-elected.	▌ ✓ Christopher D. Sullivan (Democratic) 76.6%; ▌Michael R. Matteo (Republican) 18.8%; ▌Domenico Saudino (Socialist) 4.7%
New York 14	William I. Sirovich	Democratic	1926	Incumbent re-elected.	▌ ✓ William I. Sirovich (Democratic) 47.3%; ▌Jacob Panken (Socialist) 25.9%; ▌Edward E. Spafford (Republican) 25.3%; ▌Alexander Trachtenberg (Independent) 1.5%
New York 15	John J. Boylan	Democratic	1922	Incumbent re-elected.	▌ ✓ John J. Boylan (Democratic) 81.3%; ▌Alexander Todd (Republican) 16.4%; ▌Leonard C. Kaye (Socialist) 2.3%
New York 16	John J. O'Connor	Democratic	1923	Incumbent re-elected.	▌ ✓ John J. O'Connor (Democratic) 72.1%; ▌Irwin Ira Rackoff (Republican) 24.7%; ▌Hilda G. Claessens (Socialist) 3.2%
New York 17	Ruth Baker Pratt	Republican	1928	Incumbent re-elected.	▌ ✓ Ruth Baker Pratt (Republican) 43.3%; ▌Louis B. Brodsky (Democratic) 41.8%; ▌Heywood Broun (Socialist) 14.9%
New York 18	Martin J. Kennedy	Democratic	1930	Incumbent re-elected.	▌ ✓ Martin J. Kennedy (Democratic) 77.0%; ▌Patrick S. Hickey (Republican) 18.4%; ▌Edward F. Cassidy (Socialist) 4.6%
New York 19	Sol Bloom	Democratic	1923	Incumbent re-elected.	▌ ✓ Sol Bloom (Democratic) 66.9%; ▌Julius D. Tobias (Republican) 28.2%; ▌G. August Gerber (Socialist) 4.5%; ▌Max Bedacht (Communist) 0.4%
New York 20	Fiorello La Guardia	Republican	1922	Incumbent re-elected.	▌ ✓ Fiorello La Guardia (Republican) 52.1%; ▌Vincent H. Auleta (Democratic) 42.8%; ▌Frank Poree (Socialist) 4.3%; ▌Robert Minor (Communist) 0.9%
New York 21	Joseph A. Gavagan	Democratic	1929	Incumbent re-elected.	▌ ✓ Joseph A. Gavagan (Democratic) 60.2%; ▌Mortimer Kraus (Republican) 34.3%; ▌Frank R. Crosswaith (Socialist) 5.2%; ▌James W. Ford (Communist) 0.3%
New York 22	Anthony J. Griffin	Democratic	1918	Incumbent re-elected.	▌ ✓ Anthony J. Griffin (Democratic) 73.9%; ▌William E. Devlin (Republican) 20.7%; ▌Andrew A. McLean (Socialist) 5.4%
New York 23	Frank Oliver	Democratic	1922	Incumbent re-elected.	▌ ✓ Frank Oliver (Democratic) 67.1%; ▌George M. Fayles (Republican) 19.7%; ▌Samuel Orr (Socialist) 11.9%; ▌Israel Amter (Communist) 1.3%
New York 24	James M. Fitzpatrick	Democratic	1926	Incumbent re-elected.	▌ ✓ James M. Fitzpatrick (Democratic) 57.0%; ▌Benjamin L. Fairchild (Republican) 34.3%; ▌Louis Weil (Socialist) 8.7%
New York 25	J. Mayhew Wainwright	Republican	1922	Incumbent retired. Republican hold.	▌ ✓ Charles D. Millard (Republican) 50.3%; ▌Thomas George Barnes (Democratic) 34.2%; ▌John H. Holzworth (Repeal Volstead Act) 13.8%; ▌John P. Muller (Socialist) 1.7%
New York 26	Hamilton Fish Jr.	Republican	1920	Incumbent re-elected.	▌ ✓ Hamilton Fish Jr. (Republican) 61.1%; ▌John K. Sague (Democratic) 35.2%; ▌Albert W. Brower (Socialist) 3.7%
New York 27	Harcourt J. Pratt	Republican	1924	Incumbent re-elected.	▌ ✓ Harcourt J. Pratt (Republican) 52.9%; ▌Guernsey T. Cross (Democratic) 45.4%; ▌Bertha P. Weyl (Socialist) 1.7%
New York 28	Parker Corning	Democratic	1922	Incumbent re-elected.	▌ ✓ Parker Corning (Democratic) 63.5%; ▌Laura B. Treadwell (Republican) 34.7%; ▌Robert H. Ritchey (Socialist) 1.8%
New York 29	James S. Parker	Republican	1912	Incumbent re-elected.	▌ ✓ James S. Parker (Republican) 58.5%; ▌Theodore A. Knapp (Democratic) 40.2%; ▌John H. Sullivan (Socialist) 1.3%
New York 30	Frank Crowther	Republican	1918	Incumbent re-elected.	▌ ✓ Frank Crowther (Republican) 52.1%; ▌Izetta Jewel Miller (Democratic) 45.4%; ▌Charles W. Noonan (Socialist) 2.5%
New York 31	Bertrand Snell	Republican	1915	Incumbent re-elected.	▌ ✓ Bertrand Snell (Republican) 61.8%; ▌Rufus A. Prescott (Democratic) 37.1%; ▌Jeannette Marks (Socialist) 1.1%
New York 32	Francis D. Culkin	Republican	1928	Incumbent re-elected.	▌ ✓ Francis D. Culkin (Republican) 66.6%; ▌Walter W. Wilcox (Democratic) 31.9%; ▌James A. Manson (Socialist) 1.5%
New York 33	Frederick M. Davenport	Republican	1924	Incumbent re-elected.	▌ ✓ Frederick M. Davenport (Republican) 50.3%; ▌James J. Loftis (Democratic) 49.7%
New York 34	John D. Clarke	Republican	1926	Incumbent re-elected.	▌ ✓ John D. Clarke (Republican) 68.2%; ▌James F. Byrne (Democratic) 31.8%
New York 35	Clarence E. Hancock	Republican	1927	Incumbent re-elected.	▌ ✓ Clarence E. Hancock (Republican) 57.6%; ▌Frederick B. Northup (Democratic) 39.9%; ▌Henry Hotze (Socialist) 2.4%
New York 36	John Taber	Republican	1922	Incumbent re-elected.	▌ ✓ John Taber (Republican) 63.3%; ▌Joseph P. Craugh (Democratic) 34.9%; ▌Elmer Pierce (Socialist) 1.9%
New York 37	Gale H. Stalker	Republican	1922	Incumbent re-elected.	▌ ✓ Gale H. Stalker (Republican) 59.4%; ▌Julian P. Bretz (Democratic) 38.4%; ▌Hezekiah D. Wilcox (Socialist) 2.2%
New York 38	James L. Whitley	Republican	1928	Incumbent re-elected.	▌ ✓ James L. Whitley (Republican) 55.3%; ▌Nelson E. Spencer (Democratic) 41.4%; ▌Harry Hoffman (Socialist) 3.3%
New York 39	Archie D. Sanders	Republican	1916	Incumbent re-elected.	▌ ✓ Archie D. Sanders (Republican) 55.8%; ▌James M. Dwyer (Democratic) 41.2%; ▌William Hilsdorf (Socialist) 3.0%
New York 40	S. Wallace Dempsey	Republican	1914	Incumbent lost renomination. Republican hold.	▌ ✓ Walter G. Andrews (Republican) 63.1%; ▌Roland Crangle (Democratic) 28.0%; ▌Frank C. Perkins (Independent) 5.3%; ▌Thomas Justice (Socialist) 3.6%
New York 41	Edmund F. Cooke	Republican	1928	Incumbent re-elected.	▌ ✓ Edmund F. Cooke (Republican) 48.9%; ▌Henry F. Jerge (Democratic) 46.8%; ▌Fred Weinheimer (Socialist) 4.2%
New York 42	James M. Mead	Democratic	1918	Incumbent re-elected.	▌ ✓ James M. Mead (Democratic) 65.6%; ▌Frank A. Dorn (Republican) 31.8%; ▌Clara Haushammer (Socialist) 2.6%
New York 43	Daniel A. Reed	Republican	1918	Incumbent re-elected.	▌ ✓ Daniel A. Reed (Republican) 70.6%; ▌Mattie C. Dellone (Democratic) 26.8%; ▌Herman Guntner (Democratic) 2.6%

== North Carolina ==
District	Incumbent			This race	
District	Member	Party	First elected	Results	Candidates
North Carolina 1	Lindsay C. Warren	Democratic	1924	Incumbent re-elected.	▌ ✓ Lindsay C. Warren (Democratic); Uncontested
North Carolina 2	John H. Kerr	Democratic	1923	Incumbent re-elected.	▌ ✓ John H. Kerr (Democratic) 93.4%; ▌E. Dana Dickens (Republican) 6.6%
North Carolina 3	Charles L. Abernethy	Democratic	1922	Incumbent re-elected.	▌ ✓ Charles L. Abernethy (Democratic) 66.4%; ▌William G. Mebane (Republican) 33.6%
North Carolina 4	Edward W. Pou	Democratic	1900	Incumbent re-elected.	▌ ✓ Edward W. Pou (Democratic) 73.4%; ▌John C. Matthews (Republican) 26.6%
North Carolina 5	Charles Manly Stedman	Democratic	1910	Incumbent died. Democratic hold.	▌ ✓ Franklin Wills Hancock Jr. (Democratic) 61.3%; ▌John F. Reynolds (Republican) 38.7%
North Carolina 6	J. Bayard Clark	Democratic	1928	Incumbent re-elected.	▌ ✓ J. Bayard Clark (Democratic) 71.3%; ▌C. Edward Taylor (Republican) 28.7%
North Carolina 7	William C. Hammer	Democratic	1920	Incumbent died. Democratic hold.	▌ ✓ Walter Lambeth (Democratic) 59.0%; ▌Colin G. Spencer (Republican) 41.0%
North Carolina 8	Robert L. Doughton	Democratic	1910	Incumbent re-elected.	▌ ✓ Robert L. Doughton (Democratic) 60.1%; ▌Edward F. Wakefield (Republican) 39.9%
North Carolina 9	Charles A. Jonas	Republican	1928	Incumbent lost re-election. Democratic gain.	▌ ✓ Alfred L. Bulwinkle (Democratic) 53.8%; ▌Charles A. Jonas (Republican) 46.2%
North Carolina 10	George M. Pritchard	Republican	1928	Incumbent retired to run for U.S. Senator. Democratic gain.	▌ ✓ Zebulon Weaver (Democratic) 56.2%; ▌Brownlow Jackson (Republican) 43.8%

== North Dakota ==
District	Incumbent			This race	
District	Member	Party	First elected	Results	Candidates
North Dakota 1	Olger B. Burtness	Republican	1920	Incumbent re-elected.	▌ ✓ Olger B. Burtness (Republican) 74.6%; ▌J. E. Garvey (Democratic) 25.4%
North Dakota 2	Thomas Hall	Republican	1924	Incumbent re-elected.	▌ ✓ Thomas Hall (Republican) 55.7%; ▌P. W. Lanier (Democratic) 42.2%; ▌Alfred Knutson (Communist) 2.1%
North Dakota 3	James H. Sinclair	Republican	1918	Incumbent re-elected.	▌ ✓ James H. Sinclair (Republican) 77.8%; ▌Reuben H. Leavitt (Democratic) 18.8%; ▌Andrew Omholt (Communist) 3.4%

== Ohio ==
District	Incumbent			This race	
District	Member	Party	First elected	Results	Candidates
Ohio 1	Nicholas Longworth	Republican	1914	Incumbent re-elected.	▌ ✓ Nicholas Longworth (Republican) 51.8%; ▌John W. Pattison (Democratic) 48.2%
Ohio 2	William E. Hess	Republican	1928	Incumbent re-elected.	▌ ✓ William E. Hess (Republican) 50.3%; ▌Charles Sawyer (Democratic) 49.7%
Ohio 3	Roy G. Fitzgerald	Republican	1920	Incumbent lost re-election. Democratic gain.	▌ ✓ Byron B. Harlan (Democratic) 50.8%; ▌Roy G. Fitzgerald (Republican) 49.2%
Ohio 4	John L. Cable	Republican	1928	Incumbent re-elected.	▌ ✓ John L. Cable (Republican) 53.4%; ▌Gainor Jennings (Democratic) 46.6%
Ohio 5	Charles J. Thompson	Republican	1918	Incumbent lost re-election. Democratic gain.	▌ ✓ Frank C. Kniffin (Democratic) 51.4%; ▌Charles J. Thompson (Republican) 48.6%
Ohio 6	Charles C. Kearns	Republican	1914	Incumbent lost re-election. Democratic gain.	▌ ✓ James G. Polk (Democratic) 52.7%; ▌Charles Cyrus Kearns (Republican) 47.3%
Ohio 7	Charles Brand	Republican	1922	Incumbent re-elected.	▌ ✓ Charles Brand (Republican) 56.4%; ▌John L. Zimmerman Jr. (Democratic) 43.6%
Ohio 8	Grant E. Mouser	Republican	1928	Incumbent re-elected.	▌ ✓ Grant E. Mouser (Republican) 51.3%; ▌Carl W. Smith (Democratic) 48.7%
Ohio 9	William W. Chalmers	Republican	1924	Incumbent lost renomination. Republican hold.	▌ ✓ Wilbur M. White (Republican) 57.6%; ▌Scott Stahl (Democratic) 42.4%
Ohio 10	Thomas A. Jenkins	Republican	1924	Incumbent re-elected.	▌ ✓ Thomas A. Jenkins (Republican) 62.4%; ▌H. L. Crary (Democratic) 37.6%
Ohio 11	Mell G. Underwood	Democratic	1922	Incumbent re-elected.	▌ ✓ Mell G. Underwood (Democratic) 64.0%; ▌Ned Thacher (Republican) 36.0%
Ohio 12	John C. Speaks	Republican	1920	Incumbent lost re-election. Democratic gain.	▌ ✓ Arthur P. Lamneck (Democratic) 57.5%; ▌John C. Speaks (Republican) 42.5%
Ohio 13	Joseph E. Baird	Republican	1928	Incumbent lost re-election. Democratic gain.	▌ ✓ William L. Fiesinger (Democratic) 52.0%; ▌Joseph E. Baird (Republican) 48.0%
Ohio 14	Francis Seiberling	Republican	1928	Incumbent re-elected.	▌ ✓ Francis Seiberling (Republican) 50.3%; ▌Dow W. Harter (Democratic) 49.7%
Ohio 15	C. Ellis Moore	Republican	1918	Incumbent re-elected.	▌ ✓ C. Ellis Moore (Republican) 51.2%; ▌H. R. McClintock (Democratic) 48.8%
Ohio 16	Charles B. McClintock	Republican	1928	Incumbent re-elected.	▌ ✓ Charles B. McClintock (Republican) 52.0%; ▌William R. Thom (Democratic) 48.0%
Ohio 17	William M. Morgan	Republican	1920	Incumbent lost re-election. Democratic gain.	▌ ✓ Charles West (Democratic) 51.4%; ▌William M. Morgan (Republican) 48.6%
Ohio 18	B. Frank Murphy	Republican	1918	Incumbent re-elected.	▌ ✓ B. Frank Murphy (Republican) 60.4%; ▌Emerson Campbell (Democratic) 39.6%
Ohio 19	John G. Cooper	Republican	1914	Incumbent re-elected.	▌ ✓ John G. Cooper (Republican) 56.9%; ▌W. B. Kilpatrick (Democratic) 43.1%
Ohio 20	Charles A. Mooney	Democratic	1922	Incumbent re-elected.	▌ ✓ Charles A. Mooney (Democratic) 75.3%; ▌Max D. Gustin (Republican) 24.7%
Ohio 21	Robert Crosser	Democratic	1922	Incumbent re-elected.	▌ ✓ Robert Crosser (Democratic) 51.3%; ▌George H. Bender (Republican) 48.6%; ▌Gustave F. Ebding (Independent) 0.2%
Ohio 22	Chester C. Bolton	Republican	1928	Incumbent re-elected.	▌ ✓ Chester C. Bolton (Republican) 56.8%; ▌Edward F. Carran (Democratic) 34.8%; ▌Helen Green (Independent) 8.3%

== Oklahoma ==
District	Incumbent			This race	
District	Member	Party	First elected	Results	Candidates
Oklahoma 1	Charles O'Connor	Republican	1928	Incumbent lost re-election. Democratic gain.	▌ ✓ Wesley E. Disney (Democratic) 50.2%; ▌Charles O'Connor (Republican) 49.8%
Oklahoma 2	William W. Hastings	Democratic	1922	Incumbent re-elected.	▌ ✓ William W. Hastings (Democratic) 61.5%; ▌E. L. Kirby (Republican) 38.5%
Oklahoma 3	Wilburn Cartwright	Democratic	1926	Incumbent re-elected.	▌ ✓ Wilburn Cartwright (Democratic) 80.4%; ▌Palestine Brice (Republican) 19.6%
Oklahoma 4	Tom D. McKeown	Democratic	1922	Incumbent re-elected.	▌ ✓ Tom D. McKeown (Democratic) 69.7%; ▌M. L. Matson (Republican) 30.3%
Oklahoma 5	Ulysses S. Stone	Republican	1928	Incumbent lost re-election. Democratic gain.	▌ ✓ Fletcher B. Swank (Democratic) 58.7%; ▌Ulysses S. Stone (Republican) 41.3%
Oklahoma 6	Jed Johnson	Democratic	1926	Incumbent re-elected.	▌ ✓ Jed Johnson (Democratic) 71.6%; ▌Ann W. Dillard (Republican) 28.4%
Oklahoma 7	James V. McClintic	Democratic	1914	Incumbent re-elected.	▌ ✓ James V. McClintic (Democratic) 78.2%; ▌R. C. Holt (Republican) 21.8%
Oklahoma 8	Milton C. Garber	Republican	1922	Incumbent re-elected.	▌ ✓ Milton C. Garber (Republican) 60.4%; ▌H. B. King (Democratic) 39.3%; ▌Richard J. Shive (Independent) 0.3%

== Oregon ==
District	Incumbent			This race	
District	Member	Party	First elected	Results	Candidates
Oregon 1	Willis C. Hawley	Republican	1906	Incumbent re-elected.	▌ ✓ Willis C. Hawley (Republican) 55.5%; ▌William A. Delzell (Democratic) 44.5%
Oregon 2	Robert R. Butler	Republican	1928	Incumbent re-elected.	▌ ✓ Robert R. Butler (Republican) 66.0%; ▌Robert E. Bradford (Democratic) 34.0%
Oregon 3	Franklin F. Korell	Republican	1927	Incumbent lost re-election. Democratic gain.	▌ ✓ Charles Martin (Democratic) 55.1%; ▌Franklin F. Korell (Republican) 39.7%; ▌Peter Streiff Jr. (Socialist) 5.2%

== Pennsylvania ==
District	Incumbent			This race	
District	Member	Party	First elected	Results	Candidates
Pennsylvania 1	James M. Beck	Republican	1927	Incumbent re-elected.	▌ ✓ James M. Beck (Republican) 78.9%; ▌John P. Mulrenan (Democratic) 20.5%; ▌John H. Miller (Communist) 0.6%
Pennsylvania 2	George S. Graham	Republican	1912	Incumbent re-elected.	▌ ✓ George S. Graham (Republican) 84.6%; ▌Charles S. Hill (Democratic) 15.0%; ▌Fred Rentz (Communist) 0.4%
Pennsylvania 3	Harry C. Ransley	Republican	1920	Incumbent re-elected.	▌ ✓ Harry C. Ransley (Republican) 84.4%; ▌Edward P. Carroll (Democratic) 15.2%; ▌Roy H. Hudson (Communist) 0.3%
Pennsylvania 4	Benjamin M. Golder	Republican	1924	Incumbent re-elected.	▌ ✓ Benjamin M. Golder (Republican) 78.0%; ▌Thomas J. Carroll (Democratic) 20.8%; ▌Joseph Schwartz (Socialist) 1.2%
Pennsylvania 5	James J. Connolly	Republican	1920	Incumbent re-elected.	▌ ✓ James J. Connolly (Republican) 76.6%; ▌Frank W. Dougherty (Labor) 22.9%; ▌Leo P. Lemley (Communist) 0.6%
Pennsylvania 6	George A. Welsh	Republican	1922	Incumbent re-elected.	▌ ✓ George A. Welsh (Republican) 76.1%; ▌John P. Boylan (Democratic) 23.9%
Pennsylvania 7	George P. Darrow	Republican	1914	Incumbent re-elected.	▌ ✓ George P. Darrow (Republican) 77.5%; ▌Robert V. Bolger (Democratic) 22.5%
Pennsylvania 8	James Wolfenden	Republican	1928	Incumbent re-elected.	▌ ✓ James Wolfenden (Republican) 80.5%; ▌Harry D. Wescott (Democratic) 19.5%
Pennsylvania 9	Henry Winfield Watson	Republican	1914	Incumbent re-elected.	▌ ✓ Henry Winfield Watson (Republican) 73.0%; ▌John F. Headly (Democratic) 27.0%
Pennsylvania 10	J. Roland Kinzer	Republican	1930	Incumbent re-elected.	▌ ✓ J. Roland Kinzer (Republican) 77.3%; ▌William A. Brinkman (Democratic) 22.7%
Pennsylvania 11	Laurence H. Watres	Republican	1922	Incumbent retired. Democratic gain.	▌ ✓ Patrick J. Boland (Democratic); Uncontested
Pennsylvania 12	Charles Murray Turpin	Republican	1929	Incumbent re-elected.	▌ ✓ Charles Murray Turpin (Republican) 57.8%; ▌John T. Kmetz (Democratic) 42.2%
Pennsylvania 13	George F. Brumm	Republican	1928	Incumbent re-elected.	▌ ✓ George F. Brumm (Republican) 92.3%; ▌William Wilhelm (Democratic) 7.7%
Pennsylvania 14	Charles J. Esterly	Republican	1928	Incumbent retired. Democratic gain.	▌ ✓ Norton Lichtenwalner (Democratic) 52.4%; ▌Robert Grey Bushong (Republican) 34.3%; ▌Andrew P. Bower (Socialist) 13.3%
Pennsylvania 15	Louis T. McFadden	Republican	1914	Incumbent re-elected.	▌ ✓ Louis T. McFadden (Republican) 72.6%; ▌Frank J. Price (Democratic) 27.4%
Pennsylvania 16	Edgar R. Kiess	Republican	1912	Incumbent died. Republican hold.	▌ ✓ Robert F. Rich (Republican) 75.5%; ▌J. Drew Fague (Democratic) 24.5%
Pennsylvania 17	Frederick W. Magrady	Republican	1924	Incumbent re-elected.	▌ ✓ Frederick W. Magrady (Republican) 60.5%; ▌Samuel M. Shipman (Democratic) 39.5%
Pennsylvania 18	Edward M. Beers	Republican	1922	Incumbent re-elected.	▌ ✓ Edward M. Beers (Republican) 68.0%; ▌T. Z. Minehart (Democratic) 32.0%
Pennsylvania 19	Isaac Hoffer Doutrich	Republican	1926	Incumbent re-elected.	▌ ✓ Isaac Hoffer Doutrich (Republican) 79.4%; ▌Harold V. McNair (Democratic) 20.6%
Pennsylvania 20	James Russell Leech	Republican	1926	Incumbent re-elected.	▌ ✓ James Russell Leech (Republican) 54.9%; ▌George E. Wolfe (Democratic) 45.1%
Pennsylvania 21	J. Banks Kurtz	Republican	1922	Incumbent re-elected.	▌ ✓ J. Banks Kurtz (Republican) 71.8%; ▌Bernard J. Clark (Democratic) 28.2%
Pennsylvania 22	Franklin Menges	Republican	1924	Incumbent lost re-election. Democratic gain.	▌ ✓ Harry L. Haines (Democratic) 54.4%; ▌Franklin Menges (Republican) 44.2%; ▌Harry W. Logeman (Socialist) 1.1%
Pennsylvania 23	James Mitchell Chase	Republican	1926	Incumbent re-elected.	▌ ✓ James Mitchell Chase (Republican) 70.8%; ▌Maxwell J. Moore (Democratic) 29.2%
Pennsylvania 24	Samuel Austin Kendall	Republican	1918	Incumbent re-elected.	▌ ✓ Samuel Austin Kendall (Republican) 67.6%; ▌Milton M. Brooke (Democratic) 32.4%
Pennsylvania 25	Henry Wilson Temple	Republican	1912	Incumbent re-elected.	▌ ✓ Henry Wilson Temple (Republican) 69.8%; ▌James S. Pates (Democratic) 30.2%
Pennsylvania 26	J. Howard Swick	Republican	1926	Incumbent re-elected.	▌ ✓ J. Howard Swick (Republican) 100.0%
Pennsylvania 27	Nathan Leroy Strong	Republican	1916	Incumbent re-elected.	▌ ✓ Nathan Leroy Strong (Republican) 79.1%; ▌D. R. Tomb (Democratic) 20.9%
Pennsylvania 28	Thomas C. Cochran	Republican	1926	Incumbent re-elected.	▌ ✓ Thomas C. Cochran (Republican) 70.9%; ▌Guy Thorne (Democratic) 29.1%
Pennsylvania 29	Milton W. Shreve	Republican	1918	Incumbent re-elected.	▌ ✓ Milton W. Shreve (Republican) 54.5%; ▌Charles N. Crosby (Democratic) 45.5%
Pennsylvania 30	William R. Coyle	Republican	1928	Incumbent re-elected.	▌ ✓ William R. Coyle (Republican) 50.8%; ▌Everett Kent (Democratic) 49.2%
Pennsylvania 31	Adam M. Wyant	Republican	1920	Incumbent re-elected.	▌ ✓ Adam M. Wyant (Republican) 70.5%; ▌James M. Cramer (Democratic) 27.2%; ▌Harry Eckard (Socialist) 2.4%
Pennsylvania 32	Stephen Geyer Porter	Republican	1910	Incumbent died. Republican hold.	▌ ✓ Edmund Frederick Erk (Republican) 82.6%; ▌Edward S. Michalowski (Democratic) 16.6%; ▌E. J. Horacek (Communist) 0.8%
Pennsylvania 33	Melville Clyde Kelly	Republican	1916	Incumbent re-elected.	▌ ✓ Melville Clyde Kelly (Republican) 96.4%; ▌William Adams (Socialist) 3.5%
Pennsylvania 34	Patrick J. Sullivan	Republican	1928	Incumbent re-elected.	▌ ✓ Patrick J. Sullivan (Republican) 97.6%; ▌Max Jenkins (Communist) 2.4%
Pennsylvania 35	Harry A. Estep	Republican	1926	Incumbent re-elected.	▌ ✓ Harry A. Estep (Republican) 81.6%; ▌John Murphy (Democratic) 18.3%
Pennsylvania 36	Guy E. Campbell	Republican	1916	Incumbent re-elected.	▌ ✓ Guy E. Campbell (Republican) 99.9%

== Rhode Island ==
District	Incumbent			This race	
District	Member	Party	First elected	Results	Candidates
Rhode Island 1	Clark Burdick	Republican	1918	Incumbent re-elected.	▌ ✓ Clark Burdick (Republican) 57.5%; ▌Samuel W. Smith Jr. (Democratic) 42.5%
Rhode Island 2	Richard S. Aldrich	Republican	1922	Incumbent re-elected.	▌ ✓ Richard S. Aldrich (Republican) 54.7%; ▌Arthur L. Conaty (Democratic) 45.3%
Rhode Island 3	Jeremiah E. O'Connell	Democratic	1928	Incumbent resigned to become an associate justice of the Rhode Island Superior Court. Democratic hold.	▌ ✓ Francis Condon (Democratic) 56.4%; ▌William R. Fortin (Republican) 43.6%

== South Carolina ==
District	Incumbent			This race	
District	Member	Party	First elected	Results	Candidates
South Carolina 1	Thomas S. McMillan	Democratic	1924	Incumbent re-elected.	▌ ✓ Thomas S. McMillan (Democratic); Uncontested
South Carolina 2	Butler B. Hare	Democratic	1924	Incumbent re-elected.	▌ ✓ Butler B. Hare (Democratic); Uncontested
South Carolina 3	Frederick H. Dominick	Democratic	1916	Incumbent re-elected.	▌ ✓ Frederick H. Dominick (Democratic); Uncontested
South Carolina 4	John J. McSwain	Democratic	1920	Incumbent re-elected.	▌ ✓ John J. McSwain (Democratic); Uncontested
South Carolina 5	William Francis Stevenson	Democratic	1917	Incumbent re-elected.	▌ ✓ William Francis Stevenson (Democratic); Uncontested
South Carolina 6	Allard H. Gasque	Democratic	1922	Incumbent re-elected.	▌ ✓ Allard H. Gasque (Democratic); Uncontested
South Carolina 7	Hampton P. Fulmer	Democratic	1920	Incumbent re-elected.	▌ ✓ Hampton P. Fulmer (Democratic); Uncontested

== South Dakota ==
District	Incumbent			This race	
District	Member	Party	First elected	Results	Candidates
South Dakota 1	Charles A. Christopherson	Republican	1918	Incumbent re-elected.	▌ ✓ Charles A. Christopherson (Republican) 84.7%; ▌Henry Bormann (Independent) 15.3%
South Dakota 2	Royal C. Johnson	Republican	1914	Incumbent re-elected.	▌ ✓ Royal C. Johnson (Republican) 52.4%; ▌Fred H. Hildebrandt (Democratic) 47.0%; ▌Einow Niva (Independent) 0.7%
South Dakota 3	William Williamson	Republican	1920	Incumbent re-elected.	▌ ✓ William Williamson (Republican) 55.8%; ▌Theodore B. Werner (Democratic) 44.2%

== Tennessee ==
District	Incumbent			This race	
District	Member	Party	First elected	Results	Candidates
Tennessee 1	B. Carroll Reece	Republican	1920	Incumbent lost re-election. Republican hold.	▌ ✓ Oscar Lovette (Republican) 53.4%; ▌B. Carroll Reece (Republican) 46.6%
Tennessee 2	J. Will Taylor	Republican	1918	Incumbent re-elected.	▌ ✓ J. Will Taylor (Republican) 55.6%; ▌E. E. Patton (Ind. Republican) 41.6%; ▌J. Brown (Independent) 2.9%
Tennessee 3	Sam D. McReynolds	Democratic	1922	Incumbent re-elected.	▌ ✓ Sam D. McReynolds (Democratic); Uncontested
Tennessee 4	Cordell Hull	Democratic	1922	Incumbent retired to run for U.S. Senator. Democratic hold.	▌ ✓ John Ridley Mitchell (Democratic); Uncontested
Tennessee 5	Ewin L. Davis	Democratic	1918	Incumbent re-elected.	▌ ✓ Ewin L. Davis (Democratic) 92.0%; ▌George Motlow (Republican) 8.0%
Tennessee 6	Jo Byrns	Democratic	1908	Incumbent re-elected.	▌ ✓ Jo Byrns (Democratic) 93.3%; ▌E. L. Bradbury (Independent) 6.7%
Tennessee 7	Edward E. Eslick	Democratic	1924	Incumbent re-elected.	▌ ✓ Edward E. Eslick (Democratic); Uncontested
Tennessee 8	Gordon Browning	Democratic	1922	Incumbent re-elected.	▌ ✓ Gordon Browning (Democratic); Uncontested
Tennessee 9	Jere Cooper	Democratic	1928	Incumbent re-elected.	▌ ✓ Jere Cooper (Democratic); Uncontested
Tennessee 10	Hubert Fisher	Democratic	1916	Incumbent retired. Democratic hold.	▌ ✓ E. H. Crump (Democratic) 93.7%; ▌Herbert L. Harper (Republican) 3.9%; ▌Thomas B. Collier (Democratic) 2.4%

== Texas ==
District	Incumbent			This race	
District	Member	Party	First elected	Results	Candidates
Texas 1	Wright Patman	Democratic	1928	Incumbent re-elected.	▌ ✓ Wright Patman (Democratic) 94.7%; ▌Thomas A. Clarke (Republican) 5.3%
Texas 2	John C. Box	Democratic	1918	Incumbent lost renomination. Democratic hold.	▌ ✓ Martin Dies Jr. (Democratic); Uncontested
Texas 3	Morgan G. Sanders	Democratic	1920	Incumbent re-elected.	▌ ✓ Morgan G. Sanders (Democratic); Uncontested
Texas 4	Sam Rayburn	Democratic	1912	Incumbent re-elected.	▌ ✓ Sam Rayburn (Democratic) 88.8%; ▌Floyd Harry (Republican) 11.2%
Texas 5	Hatton W. Sumners	Democratic	1914	Incumbent re-elected.	▌ ✓ Hatton W. Sumners (Democratic) 88.1%; ▌Clinton S. Bailey (Republican) 11.9%
Texas 6	Luther A. Johnson	Democratic	1922	Incumbent re-elected.	▌ ✓ Luther A. Johnson (Democratic); Uncontested
Texas 7	Clay Stone Briggs	Democratic	1918	Incumbent re-elected.	▌ ✓ Clay Stone Briggs (Democratic); Uncontested
Texas 8	Daniel E. Garrett	Democratic	1920	Incumbent re-elected.	▌ ✓ Daniel E. Garrett (Democratic); Uncontested
Texas 9	Joseph J. Mansfield	Democratic	1916	Incumbent re-elected.	▌ ✓ Joseph J. Mansfield (Democratic) 87.6%; ▌George Seydler (Republican) 12.4%
Texas 10	James P. Buchanan	Democratic	1912	Incumbent re-elected.	▌ ✓ James P. Buchanan (Democratic); Uncontested
Texas 11	Oliver H. Cross	Democratic	1928	Incumbent re-elected.	▌ ✓ Oliver H. Cross (Democratic); Uncontested
Texas 12	Fritz G. Lanham	Democratic	1919	Incumbent re-elected.	▌ ✓ Fritz G. Lanham (Democratic); Uncontested
Texas 13	Guinn Williams	Democratic	1922	Incumbent re-elected.	▌ ✓ Guinn William (Democratic) 91.1%; ▌W. C. Witcher (Republican) 8.9%
Texas 14	Harry M. Wurzbach	Republican	1930	Incumbent re-elected.	▌ ✓ Harry M. Wurzbach (Republican) 59.3%; ▌Henry B. Dielman (Democratic) 40.7%
Texas 15	John Nance Garner	Democratic	1902	Incumbent re-elected.	▌ ✓ John Nance Garner (Democratic) 77.5%; ▌Carlos G. Watson (Republican) 22.5%
Texas 16	Claude Benton Hudspeth	Democratic	1918	Incumbent retired. Democratic hold.	▌ ✓ R. Ewing Thomason (Democratic) 84.1%; ▌Mitchell Waldrop (Republican) 15.9%
Texas 17	Thomas L. Blanton	Democratic	1930	Incumbent re-elected.	▌ ✓ Thomas L. Blanton (Democratic); Uncontested
Texas 18	John Marvin Jones	Democratic	1916	Incumbent re-elected.	▌ ✓ John Marvin Jones (Democratic) 93.2%; ▌S. E. Fish (Republican) 6.8%

== Utah ==
District	Incumbent			This race	
District	Member	Party	First elected	Results	Candidates
Utah 1	Don B. Colton	Republican	1920	Incumbent re-elected.	▌ ✓ Don B. Colton (Republican) 60.8%; ▌Joseph Ririe (Democratic) 38.7%; ▌A. W. Clemons (Socialist) 0.5%
Utah 2	Elmer O. Leatherwood	Republican	1920	Incumbent died December 24, 1929. Republican hold. Successor also elected to finish the current term.	▌ ✓ Frederick C. Loofbourow (Republican) 44.3%; ▌Joshua H. Paul (Democratic) 42.4%; ▌George N. Lawrence (Liberty) 13.0%; ▌Otto E. Parsons (Socialist) 0.3%

== Vermont ==
District	Incumbent			This race	
District	Member	Party	First elected	Results	Candidates
Vermont 1	Elbert S. Brigham	Republican	1924	Incumbent retired. Republican hold.	▌ ✓ John E. Weeks (Republican) 58.0%; ▌Joseph A. McNamara (Democratic) 42.0%
Vermont 2	Ernest W. Gibson	Republican	1923	Incumbent re-elected.	▌ ✓ Ernest W. Gibson (Republican) 81.2%; ▌James Cosgrove (Democratic) 18.8%

== Virginia ==
District	Incumbent			This race	
District	Member	Party	First elected	Results	Candidates
Virginia 1	S. Otis Bland	Democratic	1918	Incumbent re-elected.	▌ ✓ S. Otis Bland (Democratic) 91.0%; ▌W. A. Rowe (Orig. Dem.) 8.8%
Virginia 2	Menalcus Lankford	Republican	1928	Incumbent re-elected.	▌ ✓ Menalcus Lankford (Republican) 54.4%; ▌Joseph T. Deal (Democratic) 45.6%
Virginia 3	Jack Montague	Democratic	1912	Incumbent re-elected.	▌ ✓ Jack Montague (Democratic) 87.4%; ▌R. Houston Brett (Ind. Republican) 12.2%
Virginia 4	Patrick H. Drewry	Democratic	1920	Incumbent re-elected.	▌ ✓ Patrick H. Drewry (Democratic) 99.9%
Virginia 5	Joseph Whitehead	Democratic	1924	Incumbent lost renomination. Democratic hold.	▌ ✓ Thomas G. Burch (Democratic) 99.9%
Virginia 6	Clifton A. Woodrum	Democratic	1922	Incumbent re-elected.	▌ ✓ Clifton A. Woodrum (Democratic) 99.6%
Virginia 7	Jacob A. Garber	Republican	1928	Incumbent lost re-election. Democratic gain.	▌ ✓ John W. Fishburne (Democratic) 58.4%; ▌Jacob A. Garber (Republican) 41.6%
Virginia 8	R. Walton Moore	Democratic	1919	Incumbent retired. Democratic hold.	▌ ✓ Howard W. Smith (Democratic) 79.3%; ▌F. M. Brooks (Republican) 19.4%
Virginia 9	Joseph Crockett Shaffer	Republican	1928	Incumbent lost re-election. Democratic gain.	▌ ✓ John W. Flannagan Jr. (Democratic) 55.6%; ▌Joseph Crockett Shaffer (Republican) 44.4%
Virginia 10	Henry St. George Tucker III	Democratic	1922	Incumbent re-elected.	▌ ✓ Henry St. George Tucker III (Democratic) 85.9%; ▌Carney K. Rosser (Independent) 7.4%; ▌M. J. Putnam (Independent) 6.7%

== Washington ==
District	Incumbent			This race	
District	Member	Party	First elected	Results	Candidates
Washington 1	John Franklin Miller	Republican	1916	Incumbent lost renomination. Republican hold.	▌ ✓ Ralph Horr (Republican) 55.8%; ▌Charles G. Heifner (Democratic) 41.0%; ▌Jared Heardlick (Socialist Labor) 2.2%; ▌John Laurie (Communist) 1.0%
Washington 2	Lindley H. Hadley	Republican	1914	Incumbent re-elected.	▌ ✓ Lindley H. Hadley (Republican) 89.7%; ▌William J. Bouck (Farmer–Labor) 6.4%; ▌August Toellner (Independent) 2.5%; ▌L. J. Ady (Communist) 1.3%
Washington 3	Albert Johnson	Republican	1912	Incumbent re-elected.	▌ ✓ Albert Johnson (Republican) 100.0%; ▌Homer Bowan (Democratic) 0.005%
Washington 4	John W. Summers	Republican	1918	Incumbent re-elected.	▌ ✓ John W. Summers (Republican) 100.0%; ▌H. C. Davis (Republican) 0.003%; ▌H. H. Wende (Republican) 0.003%
Washington 5	Samuel B. Hill	Democratic	1923	Incumbent re-elected.	▌ ✓ Samuel B. Hill (Democratic) 74.3%; ▌T. W. Symons Jr. (Republican) 25.7%

== West Virginia ==
District	Incumbent			This race	
District	Member	Party	First elected	Results	Candidates
West Virginia 1	Carl G. Bachmann	Republican	1924	Incumbent re-elected.	▌ ✓ Carl G. Bachmann (Republican) 56.1%; ▌Robert L. Ramsay (Democratic) 43.9%
West Virginia 2	Frank L. Bowman	Republican	1924	Incumbent re-elected.	▌ ✓ Frank L. Bowman (Republican) 50.8%; ▌Jennings Randolph (Democratic) 49.2%
West Virginia 3	John M. Wolverton	Republican	1928	Incumbent lost re-election. Democratic gain.	▌ ✓ Lynn Hornor (Democratic) 51.4%; ▌John M. Wolverton (Republican) 48.6%
West Virginia 4	James A. Hughes	Republican	1926	Incumbent died. Republican hold.	▌ ✓ Robert Lynn Hogg (Republican) 53.8%; ▌Mary M. Johnson (Democratic) 46.2%
West Virginia 5	Hugh Ike Shott	Republican	1928	Incumbent re-elected.	▌ ✓ Hugh Ike Shott (Republican) 52.2%; ▌T. J. Lilly (Democratic) 47.8%
West Virginia 6	Joe L. Smith	Democratic	1928	Incumbent re-elected.	▌ ✓ Joe L. Smith (Democratic) 56.6%; ▌Fred O. Blue (Republican) 43.4%

== Wisconsin ==
District	Incumbent			This race	
District	Member	Party	First elected	Results	Candidates
Wisconsin 1	Henry A. Cooper	Republican	1920	Incumbent re-elected.	▌ ✓ Henry A. Cooper (Republican) 95.7%; ▌William C. Kiernan (Ind. Democratic) 4.3%
Wisconsin 2	Charles A. Kading	Republican	1926	Incumbent re-elected.	▌ ✓ Charles A. Kading (Republican) 71.5%; ▌A. A. Nowak (Democratic) 28.5%
Wisconsin 3	John M. Nelson	Republican	1920	Incumbent re-elected.	▌ ✓ John M. Nelson (Republican) 95.1%; ▌Frank J. Antoine (Ind. Democratic) 4.9%
Wisconsin 4	John C. Schafer	Republican	1922	Incumbent re-elected.	▌ ✓ John C. Schafer (Republican) 46.6%; ▌William F. Quick (Social-Democratic) 36.2%; ▌William J. Kershaw (Democratic) 15.5%; ▌Joseph A. Hansen (Prohibition) 0.9%; ▌John Kasun (Ind. Communist) 0.8%
Wisconsin 5	William H. Stafford	Republican	1928	Incumbent re-elected.	▌ ✓ William H. Stafford (Republican) 42.2%; ▌James P. Sheehan (Social-Democratic) 40.4%; ▌Thomas O'Malley (Democratic) 16.8%; ▌Raymond Hansborough (Ind. Communist) 0.7%
Wisconsin 6	Florian Lampert	Republican	1918	Incumbent died. Democratic gain.	▌ ✓ Michael Reilly (Democratic) 50.2%; ▌Philip Lehner (Republican) 49.0%; ▌Leonard L. Gudex (Social-Democratic) 0.7%
Wisconsin 7	Merlin Hull	Republican	1928	Incumbent lost re-election. New member elected.	▌ ✓ Gardner R. Withrow (Republican) 82.3%; ▌Merlin Hull (Republican) 14.6%; ▌Oliver Needham (Prohibition) 3.1%
Wisconsin 8	Edward E. Browne	Republican	1912	Incumbent lost renomination. Republican hold.	▌ ✓ Gerald J. Boileau (Republican) 79.1%; ▌William F. Collins (Democratic) 20.9%
Wisconsin 9	George J. Schneider	Republican	1922	Incumbent re-elected.	▌ ✓ George J. Schneider (Republican); Uncontested
Wisconsin 10	James A. Frear	Republican	1912	Incumbent re-elected.	▌ ✓ James A. Frear (Republican) 97.5%; ▌Wesley Vasey (Prohibition) 2.5%
Wisconsin 11	Hubert H. Peavey	Republican	1922	Incumbent re-elected.	▌ ✓ Hubert H. Peavey (Republican); Uncontested

== Wyoming ==
District	Incumbent			This race	
District	Member	Party	First elected	Results	Candidates
Wyoming at-large	Vincent Carter	Republican	1928	Incumbent re-elected.	▌ ✓ Vincent Carter (Republican) 64.7%; ▌John P. Rusk (Democratic) 35.3%

== Non-voting delegates ==
=== Alaska Territory ===
District	Incumbent			This race	
District	Delegate	Party	First elected	Results	Candidates
Alaska Territory at-large	Daniel Sutherland	Republican	1920	Incumbent retired. Republican hold.	▌ ✓ James Wickersham (Republican); ▌George B. Grigsby (Democratic)

== See also ==
- 1930 United States elections
  - 1930 United States Senate elections
- 71st United States Congress
- 72nd United States Congress

== Further research ==
- ▌Stevens, Susan. "The Congressional Elections of 1930: Politics of Avoidance" in Milton Plesur, ed., American Historian: Essays to Honor Selig Adler (1980), pp 149–158.
- ▌Susan F. Stevens, "Congressional Elections of 1930: Politics of Avoidance" (Ph.D. dissertation, State University of New York at Buffalo, 1980), reports that the depression seems to have not played as much of a role as prohibition, farm policy and the Smoot Hawley Tariff issues. This study focuses on the political environment of the immediate post-Crash period. Contrary to modern anticipation and historical precedent, the first elections after the Stock Market debacle proved remarkably inconclusive. Despite a host of impediments, of which economic uncertainty was only one, the incumbent Republican party managed to retain control of Congress. The margin, however, was not durable enough to withstand the deepening financial crisis. By the time the 72nd Congress was convened thirteen months later, the Democrats had secured the House of Representatives through a series of by-elections. Contemporary analysis of the 1930–31 period reveals a curious sense of ambivalence which those election results sustain. Newspapers, journals, popular publications and manuscripts have provided the main source of evidence. These subjective accounts have been weighed against the voting tallies in order to determine the context of the most significant campaigns and their results. Surprisingly, the issue of economic depression was a minor concern during the general elections. Prohibition, tariff and farm policy featured far more prominently during the fall of 1930. By 1931, however, the economic issue had become predominant and voters registered their dismay by electing Democrats. This study indicates that the mutual reluctance of either political party to deal with the depression issue, coupled with an initial disinclination by voters to upset a heretofore comfortable status quo, produced an electoral ambivalence unequalled in American congressional politics. Only the continued inability of the Republican administration to reverse economic disruption persuaded voters to embrace the unproven abilities of Democratic legislators.
- "Election Statistics". Office of the Clerk, U.S. House of Representatives.
