= Aime Forand =

American politician (1895–1972)

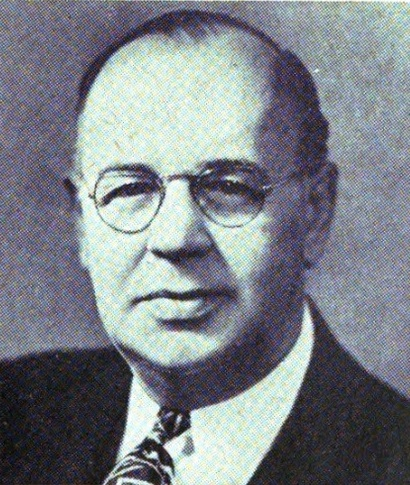

Member of the U.S. House of Representatives from Rhode Island's 1st district
- In office January 3, 1941 – January 3, 1961
- Preceded by: Charles Risk
- Succeeded by: Fernand St. Germain
- In office January 3, 1937 – January 3, 1939
- Preceded by: Charles Risk
- Succeeded by: Charles Risk

Member of the Rhode Island House of Representatives
- In office 1923-1926

Personal details
- Born: May 23, 1895 Fall River, Massachusetts, U.S.
- Died: January 18, 1972 (aged 76) Boca Raton, Florida, U.S.
- Resting place: Boca Raton Municipal Cemetery and Mausoleum
- Party: Democratic
- Spouse: Gertrude Bedard (m. 1931)
- Education: Magnus Commercial School

Military service
- Allegiance: United States
- Branch/service: United States Army
- Rank: Sergeant first class
- Unit: Motor Transport Corps
- Battles/wars: World War I

Aime Joseph Forand (May 23, 1895 – January 18, 1972) was an American politician. A member of the Democratic Party, Forand served in the United States House of Representatives for Rhode Island's 1st congressional district from 1937 to 1939 and 1941 to 1961.

== Early life and career ==
Aime Forand was born in Fall River, Massachusetts, on May 23, 1895, and later grew up in Cumberland, Rhode Island. He attended the public and parochial schools of Fall River, Magnus Commercial School in Providence, Rhode Island, and Columbia University Extension.

During World War I, Forand served in France as a sergeant first class of the Army's Motor Transport Corps under General John J. Pershing.

From 1924 to 1930, Forand was a reporter for the Providence News and News-Tribune.

== Political career ==
A Democrat, he was a member of the Rhode Island House of Representatives from 1923 to 1926, and congressional secretary for Representative Jeremiah E. O'Connell from 1929 to 1930 and Francis B. Condon from 1930 to 1935. In 1935 and 1936 Forand was Chief of the Rhode Island Division of Soldiers' Relief and Commandant of the Rhode Island Soldiers' Home.

He was elected as a Democrat to the United States House of Representatives from Rhode Island in 1936 and served from January 3, 1937, to January 3, 1939, having lost his re-election campaign in 1938. He sought election to the House in 1940 and won, and won re-election nine subsequent times, serving from January 3, 1941, to January 3, 1961.

In the 1950s, Forand was a member of the House Ways and Means Committee. He repeatedly introduced comprehensive legislation to reform public assistance. He and Cecil R. King first proposed legislation in 1957 that became known as Medicare and was enacted in 1965.

== Post-political career ==
After leaving Congress Forand lived in Boca Raton, Florida and was the founder and first president of the National Council of Senior Citizens from 1961 to 1972.

He died in Boca Raton on January 18, 1972, and was interred at Boca Raton Municipal Cemetery and Mausoleum.

U.S. House of Representatives
Preceded by Charles Risk	Member of the U.S. House of Representatives from Rhode Island's 1st congressional district 1937–1939	Succeeded by Charles Risk
Preceded by Charles Risk	Member of the U.S. House of Representatives from Rhode Island's 1st congressional district 1941–1961	Succeeded by Fernand St. Germain
