= Louis Monast =

American politician

Member of the U.S. House of Representatives from Rhode Island's 3rd district
- In office March 4, 1927 – March 3, 1929
- Preceded by: Jeremiah E. O'Connell
- Succeeded by: Jeremiah E. O'Connell

Member of the Rhode Island House of Representatives
- In office 1909–1911

Personal details
- Born: July 1, 1863 Marieville, Province of Canada
- Died: April 16, 1936 (aged 72) Pawtucket, Rhode Island, U.S.
- Party: Republican

Louis Monast (July 1, 1863 – April 16, 1936) was a Canadian-American politician, construction worker, and businessman who served as a U.S. representative from Rhode Island.

== Early life and career ==
Monast was born in Marieville in the Province of Canada (now Quebec). In the spring of 1865, he immigrated to the United States with his father, who settled in Pawtucket, Rhode Island. He attended parochial and night schools. He was employed in the textile mills from 1872 to 1882 and as a bricklayer, plasterer, and carpenter from 1882 to 1892. He engaged in building construction and in the real estate business in 1892, and also operated several bakeries.

== Political career ==
Monast served as member of the Rhode Island House of Representatives from 1909 to 1911. He served as delegate to the Republican National Convention in 1924. He was an unsuccessful candidate for election in 1924 to the Sixty-ninth Congress.

Monast was elected as a Republican to the Seventieth Congress (March 4, 1927 – March 3, 1929). He was an unsuccessful candidate for reelection in 1928 to the Seventy-first Congress. He resumed the real estate business. He died in Pawtucket, Rhode Island, April 16, 1936. He was interred in Notre Dame Cemetery.

U.S. House of Representatives
Preceded by Jeremiah E. O'Connell	Member of the U.S. House of Representatives from Rhode Island's 3rd congressional district 1927–1929	Succeeded by Jeremiah E. O'Connell
