= Rhode Island's 3rd congressional district =

- Obsolete district
- Created: 1910
- Eliminated: 1930
- Years active: 1913–1933

Rhode Island's 3rd congressional district is an obsolete district. It had a short tenure (1913–1933). In its final configuration, it covered Providence and most of its inner ring suburbs. It was eliminated after the 1930 census and split between the 1st and 2nd districts. The 3rd's last representative, Francis Condon subsequently won re-election in the 1st district.

== List of members representing the district ==
Member	Party	Years	Cong ress	Electoral history	District location
District established March 4, 1913
Ambrose Kennedy (Woonsocket)	Republican	March 4, 1913 – March 3, 1923	63rd 64th 65th 66th 67th	Elected in 1912. Re-elected in 1914. Re-elected in 1916. Re-elected in 1918. Re-elected in 1920. Retired.	1913–1933 [data missing]
Jeremiah E. O'Connell (Providence)	Democratic	March 4, 1923 – March 3, 1927	68th 69th	Elected in 1922. Re-elected in 1924. Lost re-election.	1913–1933 [data missing]
Louis Monast (Pawtucket)	Republican	March 4, 1927 – March 3, 1929	70th	Elected in 1926. Lost re-election.	1913–1933 [data missing]
Jeremiah E. O'Connell (Providence)	Democratic	March 4, 1929 – May 9, 1930	71st	Elected in 1928. Resigned to become Associate Justice of Rhode Island Superior Court.	1913–1933 [data missing]
Vacant		May 9, 1930 – November 4, 1930	71st		1913–1933 [data missing]
Francis Condon (Central Falls)	Democratic	November 4, 1930 – March 3, 1933	71st 72nd	Elected to finish O'Connell's term. Elected in 1930. Redistricted to the 1st district.	1913–1933 [data missing]
Francis Condon (Central Falls)	Democratic	November 4, 1930 – March 3, 1933	71st 72nd	Elected to finish O'Connell's term. Elected in 1930. Redistricted to the 1st district.	1931–1933 [data missing]
District dissolved March 3, 1933
