= Charles Risk =

American politician

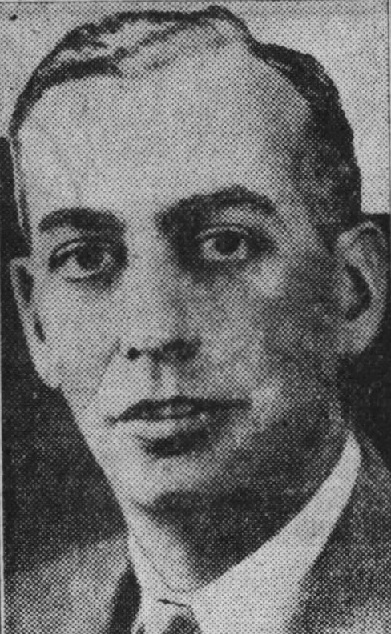

Member of the U.S. House of Representatives from Rhode Island's 1st district
- In office January 3, 1939 – January 3, 1941
- Preceded by: Aime Forand
- Succeeded by: Aime Forand
- In office August 6, 1935 – January 3, 1937
- Preceded by: Francis Condon
- Succeeded by: Aime Forand

Personal details
- Born: August 19, 1897 Central Falls, Rhode Island, U.S.
- Died: December 26, 1943 (aged 46) Lincoln, Rhode Island, U.S.
- Party: Republican
- Profession: Attorney

Military service
- Allegiance: United States
- Branch/service: United States Army
- Rank: Private
- Battles/wars: World War I

Charles Francis Risk (August 19, 1897 – December 26, 1943) was an American lawyer and World War I veteran who served two non-consecutive terms as a U.S. representative from Rhode Island in the 1930s and 1940s.

== Early life ==
Born in Central Falls, Rhode Island, Risk attended the public and high schools there. He worked in local textile plants.

== World War I ==
During the First World War he served in the United States Army as a private at Camp Meigs in 1918.

== Early career ==
He was employed in the Treasury Department in Washington, D.C., from 1919 to 1922.

=== Lawyer and judge ===
He graduated from the law department of Georgetown University in 1922, and was admitted to the bar in 1923, taking up a practice in his home town the same year.

He served as probate judge of Central Falls from 1929 to 1931, as coroner of Lincoln, Rhode Island in 1931 and 1932, and as justice of Rhode Island's 11th District Court from 1932 to 1935.

== Political career ==
He served as delegate to the Republican state conventions in 1936, 1940, and 1942.

=== Congress ===
Risk was elected to the Seventy-fourth Congress as a Republican, filling the vacancy caused by the resignation of Francis B. Condon; he served from August 6, 1935, to January 3, 1937.

He was an unsuccessful candidate for reelection in 1936.

Risk was elected to the Seventy-sixth Congress (January 3, 1939 – January 3, 1941), and made an unsuccessful reelection bid in 1940.

== Later career and death ==
After leaving Congress, he resumed the practice of law in Pawtucket, Rhode Island.

He died in Saylesville, in the township of Lincoln, Rhode Island, December 26, 1943, and was buried in St. Francis Cemetery in Pawtucket.

== Sources ==
- United States Congress. "Charles Risk (id: R000269)". Biographical Directory of the United States Congress.

U.S. House of Representatives
Preceded by Francis Condon	Member of the U.S. House of Representatives from Rhode Island's 1st congressional district 1935–1937	Succeeded by Aime Forand
Preceded by Aime Forand	Member of the U.S. House of Representatives from Rhode Island's 1st congressional district 1939–1941	Succeeded by Aime Forand
