= Ambrose Kennedy =

American politician

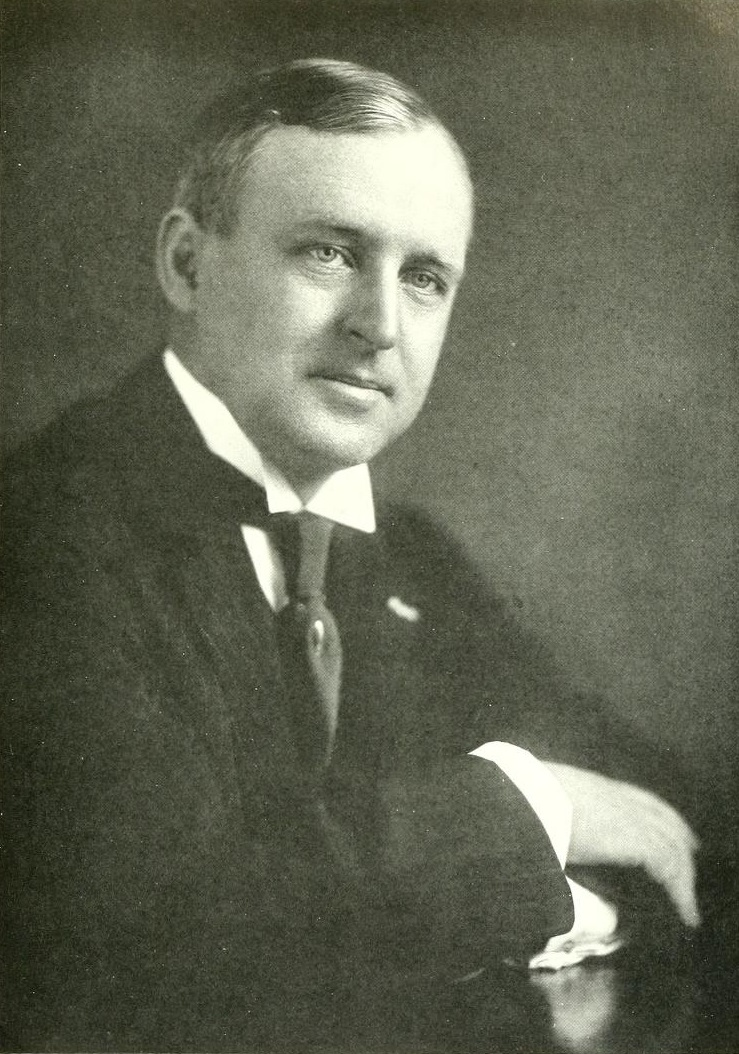

Member of the U.S. House of Representatives from Rhode Island's 3rd district
- In office March 4, 1913 – March 3, 1923
- Preceded by: District established
- Succeeded by: Jeremiah E. O'Connell

Personal details
- Born: Ambrose Patrick Kennedy; December 1, 1875 Blackstone, Massachusetts, U.S.
- Died: March 10, 1967 (aged 91) Woonsocket, Rhode Island, U.S.
- Resting place: St. Paul's Cemetery; Blackstone, Massachusetts
- Party: Republican
- Spouse: Anastacia Leahy (m. 1909; died 1967)
- Education: College of the Holy Cross (BA); Boston University (LLB)

Ambrose Patrick Kennedy (December 1, 1875 – March 10, 1967) was a U.S. representative from Rhode Island.

== Early life ==
Kennedy was born in Blackstone, Massachusetts on December 1, 1875, the son of Patrick Kennedy and Mary (née McCormick) Kennedy. He attended the Blackstone public schools and St. Hyacinthe's College, Province of Quebec, Canada.

He graduated from College of the Holy Cross, Worcester, Massachusetts, in 1897. He graduated from the Boston University Law School in 1906.

== Career ==
He served as principal of the Blackstone High School from 1898 to 1904 and as superintendent of schools 1906 to 1908. He was admitted to the bar the same year and commenced practice in Woonsocket, Rhode Island. He served as aide-de-camp on the personal staff of Gov. Aram J. Pothier with the rank of Colonel from 1909 to 1913.

=== Political career ===
From 1911 to 1913, he was a member of the Rhode Island House of Representatives, serving as speaker in 1912.

Kennedy was elected as a Republican to the Sixty-third and to the four succeeding Congresses, serving from March 4, 1913 until March 3, 1923. He retired in 1922 and was succeeded in office by Jeremiah E. O'Connell. He resumed the practice of law.

== Personal life ==
On September 1, 1909 at Middleborough, Massachusetts, Kennedy was married to teacher Anastacia Genevieve Leahy (1880–1968), a daughter of Michael A. Leahy and Julia M. O'Hara. Together, they had four children including: Ambrose, born 1911; James, born 1913; John, born 1916; and George, born 1920.

He died in Woonsocket, Rhode Island, March 10, 1967. He was interred in St. Paul's Cemetery, Blackstone, Massachusetts.

U.S. House of Representatives
Preceded by District created	Member of the U.S. House of Representatives from Rhode Island's 3rd congressional district 1913–1923	Succeeded by Jeremiah E. O'Connell
