= Clark Burdick =

American politician

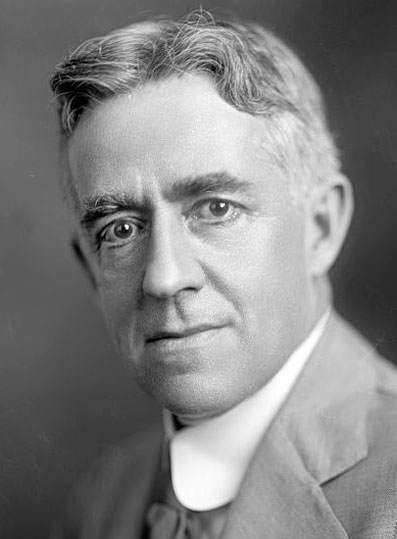

Member of the U.S. House of Representatives from Rhode Island's 1st congressional district
- In office March 4, 1919 – March 3, 1933
- Preceded by: George F. O'Shaunessy
- Succeeded by: Francis Condon

Member of the New Hampshire Senate
- In office 1915-1916

Member of the New Hampshire House of Representatives
- In office 1906-1908

Personal details
- Born: Clark Burdick; January 13, 1868 Newport, Rhode Island, U.S.
- Died: August 27, 1948 (aged 80) Newport, Rhode Island, U.S.
- Resting place: St. Mary's Episcopal Cemetery; Portsmouth, Rhode Island
- Party: Republican
- Spouse: Elizabeth L. Peckham

Military service
- Allegiance: Rhode Island
- Branch/service: Rhode Island Naval Militia
- Years of service: 1896 – 1897

Clark Burdick (January 13, 1868 – August 27, 1948) was an American lawyer and businessman who served seven terms as a U.S. representative from Rhode Island from 1919 to 1933.

== Biography ==
Born in Newport, Rhode Island, Burdick attended the public schools. He was a student at the Harvard Law School 1893-1895. He was admitted to the bar in 1894 and commenced practice in Newport. He was also interested in banking and served as president of the Newport Trust Co..

He served as member of the First Division, Rhode Island Naval Militia, in 1896 and 1897.

=== Business career ===
He served as member of the city school board 1899-1901.

=== Early political career ===
City solicitor of Newport in 1901, 1902, and again in 1907 and 1908. He served as member of the State house of representatives 1906-1908. He served as delegate to the Republican National Convention in 1912. He served as member of the Newport representative council 1906-1916, serving as chairman. He served in the State senate in 1915 and 1916.

Awarded the third class order of the Sacred Treasury of Japan for services rendered the representatives of the Emperor of Japan in 1917.

He served as mayor of Newport in 1917 and 1918.

=== Congress ===
Burdick was elected as a Republican to the Sixty-sixth and to the six succeeding Congresses (March 4, 1919 – March 3, 1933). He was an unsuccessful candidate for reelection in 1932 to the Seventy-third Congress.

=== Later career and death ===
Reengaged in the practice of law and also in his banking interests in Newport, Rhode Island, until his death on August 27, 1948.

He was interred in St. Mary's Episcopal Churchyard, Portsmouth, Rhode Island.

== Sources ==
- United States Congress. "Clark Burdick (id: B001075)". Biographical Directory of the United States Congress.

U.S. House of Representatives
Preceded by George F. O'Shaunessy	Member of the U.S. House of Representatives from Rhode Island's 1st congressional district March 4, 1919 – March 3, 1933	Succeeded by Francis Condon
