= Francis Condon =

American judge (1891–1965)

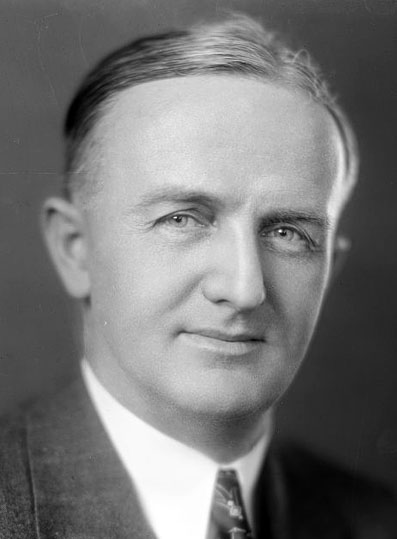

35th Chief Justice of the Rhode Island Supreme Court
- In office January 7, 1958 – November 23, 1965
- Preceded by: Edmund W. Flynn
- Succeeded by: Thomas H. Roberts

Associate Justice of the Rhode Island Supreme Court
- In office January 11, 1935 – January 7, 1958

Member of the U.S. House of Representatives from Rhode Island
- In office November 4, 1930 – January 10, 1935
- Preceded by: Jeremiah E. O'Connell (3rd); Clark Burdick (1st)
- Succeeded by: District eliminated (3rd); Charles Risk (1st)
- Constituency: 3rd district (1930-33); 1st district (1933-35)

Member of the Rhode Island House of Representatives
- In office 1923-1926

Personal details
- Born: Francis Bernard Condon; November 11, 1891 Central Falls, Rhode Island, US
- Died: November 23, 1965 (aged 74) Boston, Massachusetts, US
- Resting place: Mount St. Mary's Cemetery in Pawtucket, Rhode Island
- Party: Democratic

Francis Bernard Condon (November 11, 1891 – November 23, 1965) was an American lawyer and politician who served as a U.S. representative from Rhode Island in the 1930s.

== Early life and career ==
Condon was born in Central Falls, Rhode Island, and attended public school. He graduated from Georgetown University Law School, Washington, D.C., in 1916. He was then admitted to the bar in 1916 and commenced practice in Pawtucket, Rhode Island. He served as a sergeant in the One Hundred and Fifty-second Regiment, Depot Brigade, Twenty-third Company, from May 1918 to June 1919. He was also the Rhode Island department commander of the American Legion in 1927 and 1928.

=== Political career ===
Condon served as member of the Rhode Island House of Representatives from 1921 to 1926, serving as Democratic floor leader from 1923 to 1926. He also served as member of the Democratic State committee from 1924 to 1926 and 1928–1930, serving as a member of the executive committee from 1928 to 1930. He was an unsuccessful candidate for Lieutenant Governor of Rhode Island in 1928.

Condon was elected as a Democrat to the Seventy-first Congress to fill the vacancy caused by the resignation of Jeremiah E. O'Connell and, at the same time, was elected to the Seventy-second Congress. He was re-elected to the Seventy-third and Seventy-fourth Congresses and served from November 4, 1930, until his resignation on January 10, 1935, having been appointed an Associate Justice of the Rhode Island Supreme Court, the newly Democratic state legislature having appointed an entirely new court. He served in that capacity until January 7, 1958, when he was appointed Chief Justice.

== Death ==
He remained Chief Justice until his death in Boston, Massachusetts, on November 23, 1965. He was interred in Mount St. Mary's Cemetery in Pawtucket, Rhode Island.

== Sources ==
- United States Congress. "Francis Condon (id: C000673)". Biographical Directory of the United States Congress.

U.S. House of Representatives
Preceded by Jeremiah E. O'Connell	Member of the U.S. House of Representatives from Rhode Island's 3rd congressional district 1930–1933	Succeeded by District eliminated
Preceded by Clark Burdick	Member of the U.S. House of Representatives from Rhode Island's 1st congressional district 1933–1935	Succeeded by Charles Risk
