= Jeremiah E. O'Connell =

American judge (1883–1964)

Jeremiah Edward O'Connell
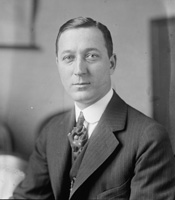

Member of the U.S. House of Representatives from Rhode Island's 3rd district
- In office March 4, 1923 – March 3, 1927
- Preceded by: Ambrose Kennedy
- Succeeded by: Louis Monast
- In office March 4, 1929 – May 9, 1930
- Preceded by: Louis Monast
- Succeeded by: Francis Condon

Personal details
- Born: July 8, 1883 Wakefield, Massachusetts
- Died: September 18, 1964 (aged 81) Cranston, Rhode Island
- Party: Democratic Party
- Education: Boston University
- Occupation: Attorney, judge

Jeremiah Edward O'Connell (July 8, 1883 – September 18, 1964) was a U.S. representative from Rhode Island.

Born in Wakefield, Massachusetts, O'Connell attended the public schools. He was graduated from Boston University in 1906 and from the law school of the same university in 1908. He was admitted to the bar in 1907 and commenced practice in Boston, Massachusetts. He moved to Providence, Rhode Island, in 1908 and continued the practice of law. He served as member of the city council 1913–1919, and as member of the board of aldermen 1919–1921.

O'Connell was elected as a Democrat to the Sixty-eighth and Sixty-ninth Congresses (March 4, 1923 – March 3, 1927). He was an unsuccessful candidate for reelection in 1926 to the Seventieth Congress.

O'Connell was elected to the Seventy-first Congress and served from March 4, 1929, until his resignation on May 9, 1930, having been appointed an associate justice of the Rhode Island Superior Court, serving until January 10, 1935, when he was appointed presiding justice and served until his resignation in 1948.

O'Connell was elected as an associate justice of the Rhode Island Supreme Court and served until his resignation on January 18, 1956. He was a resident of Cranston, Rhode Island, until his death September 18, 1964. He was interred in St. Francis Cemetery, Pawtucket, Rhode Island.

== Sources ==
- United States Congress. "Jeremiah E. O'Connell (id: O000023)". Biographical Directory of the United States Congress.

U.S. House of Representatives
Preceded by Ambrose Kennedy	Member of the U.S. House of Representatives from Rhode Island's 3rd congressional district 1923–1927	Succeeded by Louis Monast
Preceded by Louis Monast	Member of the U.S. House of Representatives from Rhode Island's 3rd congressional district 1929–1930	Succeeded by Francis Condon
