= Mike Sodrel =

American businessman and politician (born 1945)

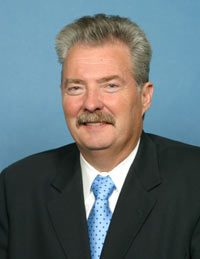

Member of the U.S. House of Representatives from Indiana's 9th district
- In office January 3, 2005 – January 3, 2007
- Preceded by: Baron Hill
- Succeeded by: Baron Hill

Personal details
- Born: Michael Eugene Sodrel; December 17, 1945 (age 80) Louisville, Kentucky, U.S.
- Party: Republican
- Spouse: Marquita Dean (died 2015)
- Children: 2
- Education: Indiana University, Southeast

Military service
- Branch/service: United States Army
- Years of service: 1966–1973
- Unit: Indiana National Guard • 151st Infantry Regiment

Michael Eugene Sodrel (born December 17, 1945) is an American politician and businessman who served as a member of the United States House of Representatives for Indiana's 9th congressional district from 2005 to 2007. Sodrel launched another run against incumbent Democratic Rep. Baron Hill in 2010 – his fifth straight run for Congress in the ninth district. However, he lost the Republican nomination to Bloomington attorney Todd Young, who won the general election.

In 2022, after a twelve-year political retirement, Sodrel announced he was running for his old seat in the 2022 United States House of Representatives elections in Indiana. He would lose the Republican primary to State Senator Erin Houchin.

== Early life ==
Born in Louisville, Kentucky, Sodrel grew up across the Ohio River in New Albany, Indiana. He graduated New Albany High School in 1963. Sodrel attended Indiana University Southeast in New Albany, Indiana.

== Career ==
From 1966 to 1973, Sodrel served in the 151st Infantry Regiment of the Indiana National Guard. He was honorably discharged with the rank of staff sergeant. Since 1963, Sodrel has worked at his family's business, Sodrel Truck Lines Inc. He founded the Free Enterprise System Inc. (a charter motor-coach/contract passenger-carrier) and Sodrel Logistics.

Sodrel is the author of an internet book, Citizen Sheep Government Shepherds.

=== U.S. House of Representatives ===
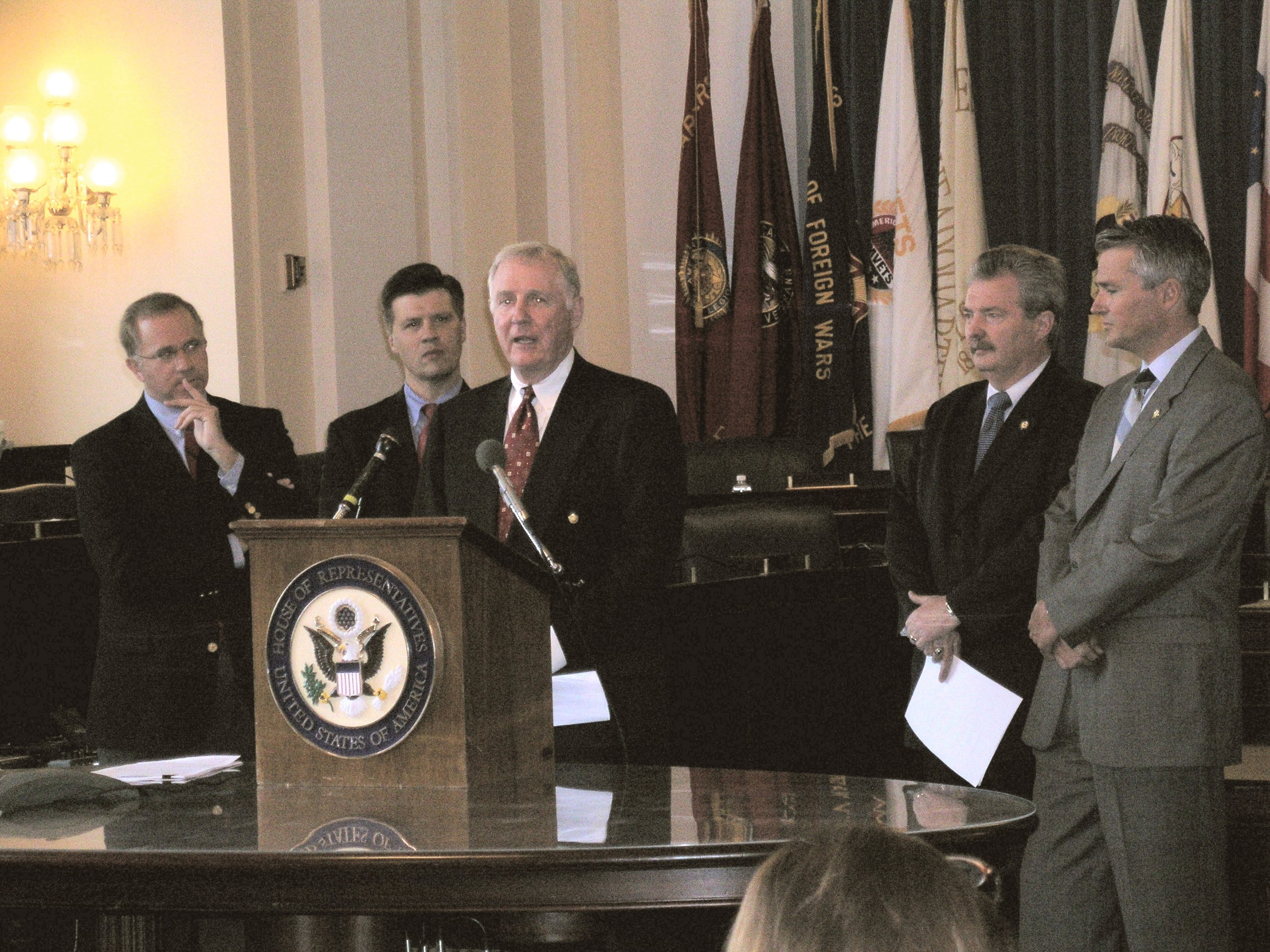
Sodrel at a joint press conference with Dan Burton, Steve Buyer, Chris Chocola, and John Hostettler in 2005

Sodrel served as a member of the United States House Committee on Agriculture, United States House Committee on Transportation and Infrastructure, United States House Committee on Small Business, and United States House Committee on Science.

During his term, Sodrel opposed partial-birth abortions and federal funding for elective abortions. He opposed additional environmental regulations. He has outspokenly supported the right to bear arms. He has a 92 lifetime rating from the American Conservative Union, and a zero rating from the League of Conservation Voters. He is in favor of permanently repealing the federal estate tax.

In 2006 Sodrel introduced a bill that would prevent federal courts from ruling on the content of speech in state legislatures. The proposal came as a response to U.S. District Judge David Hamilton's ruling that official Indiana House proceedings could not begin with sectarian prayers that advanced any particular religion.

== Political campaigns ==
Sodrel has campaigned on a platform of creating and protecting jobs, lowering taxes and values. He drives his own 18-wheeler on the campaign trail. He first ran for the House of Representatives in 2002, losing to incumbent Baron Hill, 51% to 46%. In the 2004 rematch, he defeated Hill by 1,425 votes.

=== 2006 ===
Sodrel faced Hill again in the 2006 general election. The Cook Political Report, an independent nonpartisan newsletter, rated the race as a toss-up.

President George W. Bush came to a Sodrel fundraiser in Indianapolis early in 2006, while his opponent gained help in Indianapolis with fundraisers from former President Bill Clinton.

Sodrel ultimately lost his bid for re-election by a margin of 50% to 45%. The candidates raised equivalent funds in 2006.

Texas millionaire Bob J. Perry gave more than $5 million to the Economic Freedom Fund, a 527 group, which included Hill as one of its targets for removal. The group paid for automated "push poll" calls attacking Hill. These calls stopped after action by the Indiana Attorney General.

=== 2008 ===
In October 2007 Sodrel announced that he would run again in 2008 for the Congressional seat against Baron Hill, whom he defeated in 2004 but to whom he lost in 2002 and 2006. In 2006 Cook rated the race as a toss-up for the duration of the race, but in 2008 the race moved between Likely D to Lean D on the Cook Political Report. Sodrel's fundraising was weak compared both to Hill and Sodrel's 2006 figures.

Hill defeated Sodrel in the election, 58% to 39%.

=== 2010 ===
On January 11, 2010, at an event in Jeffersonville, Indiana, Mike Sodrel announced that he would again seek the 2010 Republican nomination for the 9th congressional seat. He joined two other candidates in the field of Republican contenders: Bloomington attorney Todd Young (a native of Carmel, Indiana) and Columbus real-estate investor Travis Hankins. A poll published by the left-leaning weblog Firedoglake showed Sodrel leading Hill 49–41 in a head-to-head race. However he lost the Republican nomination, coming in third place behind Travis Hankins and winner Todd Young. Young won the general election against Hill.

=== 2022 ===
On February 8, 2022, Sodrel announced that he would once again seek the Republican nomination for the ninth district after three-term representative Trey Hollingsworth announced his retirement. Sodrel was one of nine Republicans seeking the nomination in the district. Sodrel would come in second in the primary to State Senator Erin Houchin, who would go on to succeed Hollingsworth as Congressperson for the ninth district.

== Electoral history ==
Indiana's 9th congressional district: Results 2002–2008
Year	Democrat	Votes	Pct	Republican	Votes	Pct	3rd Party	Party	Votes	Pct		3rd Party	Party	Votes	Pct
2002	Baron P. Hill	96,654	51%	Mike Sodrel	87,169	46%	Jeff Melton	Green	2,745	2%		Al Cox	Libertarian	2,389	1%
2004	Baron P. Hill	140,772	49%	Mike Sodrel	142,197	49%	Al Cox	Libertarian	4,541	2%					
2006	Baron P. Hill	110,454	50%	Mike Sodrel	100,469	46%	D. Eric Schansberg	Libertarian	9,893	4%	*				
2008	Baron P. Hill	181,254	58%	Mike Sodrel	121,514	38%	D. Eric Schansberg	Libertarian	12,000	4%					

Write-in and minor candidate notes: In 2006, Donald W. Mantooth received 33 votes.

== Personal life ==
In 1967, Sodrel married Marquita Dean; they have two children and seven granddaughters. Sodrel has served on numerous charitable organization's board of directors, including the Remnant Trust and as a past regional council president of the Boy Scouts of America.

U.S. House of Representatives
Preceded by Baron Hill	Member of the U.S. House of Representatives from Indiana's 9th congressional district 2005–2007	Succeeded by Baron Hill
U.S. order of precedence (ceremonial)
Preceded by Brian D. Kerns as Former U.S. Representative	Order of precedence of the United States as Former U.S. Representative	Succeeded by Travis Childers as Former U.S. Representative
