= Baron Hill (politician) =

American politician (born 1953)

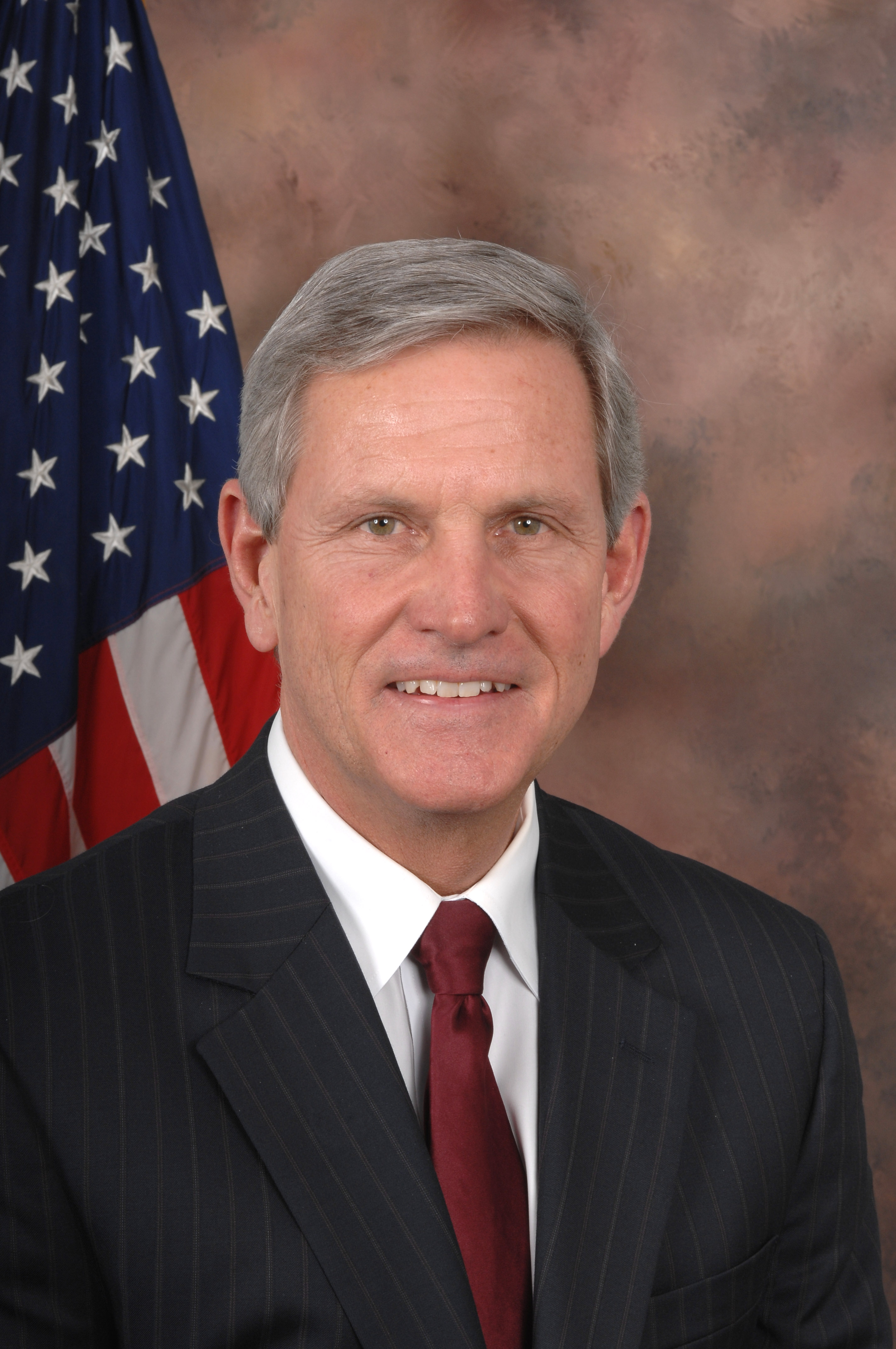
- Official portrait, 2007

Member of the U.S. House of Representatives from Indiana's 9th district
- In office January 3, 2007 – January 3, 2011
- Preceded by: Mike Sodrel
- Succeeded by: Todd Young
- In office January 3, 1999 – January 3, 2005
- Preceded by: Lee Hamilton
- Succeeded by: Mike Sodrel

Member of the Indiana House of Representatives from the 66th district
- In office November 3, 1982 – November 7, 1990
- Preceded by: Bobby Pruett
- Succeeded by: Bill Bailey

Personal details
- Born: Baron Paul Hill; June 23, 1953 (age 73) Seymour, Indiana, U.S.
- Party: Democratic
- Spouse: Betty Schepman
- Children: 3
- Education: Furman University (BA)

Baron Paul Hill (born June 23, 1953) is an American retired politician who served as a U.S. representative for Indiana's 9th congressional district from 1999 to 2005 and from 2007 to 2011.

A native of Seymour, Indiana, Hill is a Democrat, and as a member of Congress belonged to the conservative-leaning Blue Dog Coalition of that party. Hill's district is in the southeastern part of the state, stretching from Bloomington to the Indiana side of the Louisville metropolitan area.

== Early life and education ==
Hill attended Seymour High School, where he was a first-team all-state player in basketball and an all-American. He set the record for leading scorer in school history, with 1,724 points. He was inducted into the Indiana Basketball Hall of Fame in 2000.

Hill graduated from high school in 1971 and accepted an athletic scholarship to Furman University in Greenville, South Carolina, where he graduated in 1975. After graduating from college, Hill moved back to Seymour, Indiana and joined his family's business.

== Indiana House of Representatives ==
Hill was a member of the Indiana House of Representatives from 1982 to 1990. Hill chaired the state House Democratic Caucus' Campaign Committee from 1985 to 1989, and in that position helped Democrats win House elections and secure a majority.

== 1990 U.S. Senate bid ==
In 1990, as a state representative, Hill ran for the U.S. Senate in the 1990 special election to fill the last two years of Dan Quayle's term (Quayle had been elected Vice President). Hill attracted much attention (and earned media) during that race for walking the length of the state (from the Ohio River to Lake Michigan) to meet with voters. Hill ultimately lost to Senator Dan Coats (whom governor Robert Orr had appointed to fill the vacancy), 54% to 46%, a smaller margin than expected.

== U.S. House of Representatives ==
=== Votes and positions ===
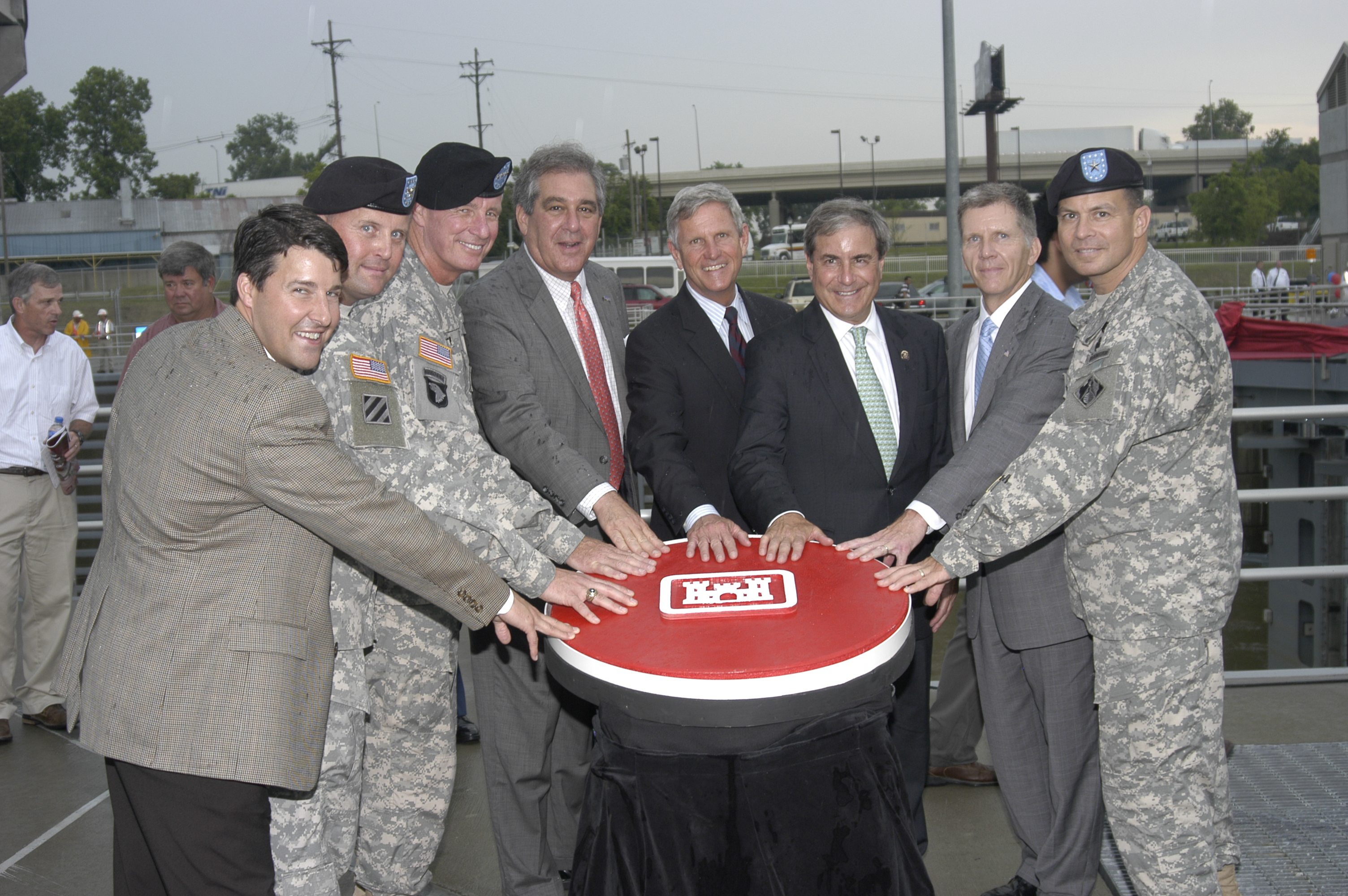
Baron Hill (center) and others open the McAlpine Lock

During five non-consecutive terms in the United States House of Representatives, Hill was a member of the Blue Dog Coalition of moderate and conservative Democrats. Hill served as the Blue Dogs' co-chair for communications and later as co-chair for policy.

In 2001, Hill voted for the No Child Left Behind Act (NCLB). In 2008, Hill said that the law needed to be revamped, saying that he did not object to accountability for schools, but that the act infringed too much on local control and unrealistically required special needs children to meet standardized testing requirements. Hill also said that the federal government had failed to provide an increase in federal school funding, as had been promised when NCLB was passed.

Hill voted in 2002 to authorize the use of the military force against Iraq in 2002, but criticized the George W. Bush administration's conduct of the reconstruction of Iraq. In October 2003, Hill said that the 2003 invasion had been well-planned but the subsequent reconstruction had not: "The president did not plan well for winning the peace and for rebuilding the nation." Hill blasted Bush's "go-it-alone" strategy and said that Bush had failed to obtain support from the international community, leading to huge U.S. expenditures that sapped away funding that could otherwise go to domestic priorities such as "homeland security, health care, education and debt reduction."

In 2007, Hill—along with Representative Lee Terry of Nebraska, a Republican—introduced a measure seeking to increase Corporate Average Fuel Economy (CAFE) standards to between 32 mpg (7.4 L/100 km) and 35 mpg (6.7 L/100 km) by 2022. The Hill-Terry proposal was more limited than a competing proposal introduced by Representative Edward J. Markey, Democrat of Massachusetts, and Representative Todd Russell Platts, Republican of Pennsylvania, which sought to raise CAFE standards for combined car-truck fleets to 35 mpg by 2018. The Hill-Terry proposal was supported by the United Auto Workers. and by industry groups such as the Alliance of Automobile Manufacturers and National Association of Manufacturers, while the Markey-Platts proposal was backed by the Sierra Club and other environmentalist groups. The final energy bill was a compromise that mandated a 35 mpg CAFE standard by 2020.

In 2008, ahead of the Indiana presidential primary, Hill endorsed Barack Obama over Hillary Clinton.

Hill voted against the Emergency Economic Stabilization Act of 2008, which created the Troubled Asset Relief Program ("Wall Street bailout"). Hill supported the American Clean Energy and Security Act of 2009 (Waxman-Markey), a cap-and-trade bill which ultimately did not pass. Hill also voted for the 2009 American Recovery and Reinvestment Act (an economic stimulus package championed by President Obama) and the 2010 Patient Protection and Affordable Care Act, landmark health care reform legislation.

During his last years in the House, Hill earned a 70 percent rating from the Human Rights Campaign, an LGBT rights advocacy group. Hill supported the repeal of don't ask, don't tell, voted for the Employment Non-Discrimination Act in 2010, and opposed a proposed amendment to the U.S. Constitution to ban same-sex marriage. Hill did not campaign for same-sex marriage, however, and did not cosponsor legislation brought by 121 Democrats to repeal the Defense of Marriage Act, which barred federal recognition of same-sex marriage. As public attitudes changed, Hill's position shifted, and in 2015, while running for Senate, Hill said: "Marriage equality is especially close to my own heart. I’m proud of Hoosiers who are fighting to make sure our friends and neighbors are guaranteed equal rights."

=== Committee assignments ===
- 107th Congress (1999–2001): Agriculture; Armed Services; Veterans' Affairs.
- 107th Congress (2001–2003): Agriculture; Armed Services; Veterans' Affairs.
- 108th Congress (2003–2005): Agriculture; Armed Services.
- 110th Congress (2007–2009): Energy and Commerce; Science and Technology.
- 111th Congress (2009–2011): Energy and Commerce; Science and Technology.

=== Campaigns ===
==== 1998 ====
Hill was elected to the House in November 1998. He defeated Republican Jean Leising, 51% to 48% and Libertarian Diane Merriam, 1%, winning the seat vacated by retiring 34-year incumbent Lee H. Hamilton.

==== 2000 ====
Hill was reelected in 2000, defeating Republican Michael Bailey 54% to 44%.

==== 2002 ====
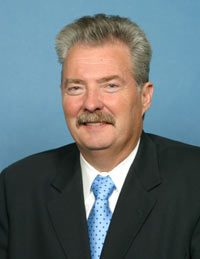
Mike Sodrel, Hill's four-time Republican opponent

In 2002, Hill defeated Republican Mike Sodrel with 51% of the vote. Sodrel, a New Albany trucking company owner, had 46%.

==== 2004 ====
In November 2004, in a rematch, Hill lost to Sodrel by 1,425 votes (about a half of a percentage point). There was a recount following reports of voting irregularities, namely malfunctioning voting machines in at least three counties. Hill gained only about two dozen votes in the recount, however, and conceded the election in early December 2004.

==== 2006 ====
Hill won the Democratic nomination in the 9th district in 2006. He was included in the "First Wave" of the Democratic Congressional Campaign Committee's "Red-to-Blue" program.

Texas millionaire Bob J. Perry gave more than $5 million to the Economic Freedom Fund, a 527 group, which included Hill as one of its targets. The group paid for automated "push poll" calls attacking Hill. Such calls were stopped after action by the Indiana Attorney General. Cook Political Report rated the race as a toss-up.

Hill won the 2006 election with 50% of the vote; Sodrel received 46% and Libertarian Eric Schansberg 4 percent.

As is the custom for returning members of Congress, the Democrats gave Hill back his seniority. He was named to the Energy and Commerce and Science and Technology committees.

==== 2008 ====
In 2008 Hill and Sodrel again fought for the 9th district. The race moved between Likely D to Lean D on the Cook Political Report. Fund raising in 2008 had become more one-sided than in 2006, with Hill far ahead in the numbers game, according to reported income.

Hill defeated Sodrel in the election, 58% to 38%.

==== 2010 ====
Hill ran unsuccessfully for reelection, losing to Republican nominee Todd Young on November 2, 2010.

==== Electoral results ====
Indiana's 9th congressional district: Results 1998–2010
Year	Democrat	Votes	%	Republican	Votes	%	3rd Party	Party	Votes	%	3rd Party	Party	Votes	%
1998	Baron P. Hill	92,973	51%	Jean Leising	87,797	48%	Diane L. Feeney	Libertarian	2,406	1%				
2000	Baron P. Hill	126,420	54%	Michael Bailey	102,219	44%	Sara Chambers	Libertarian	4,644	2%				
2002	Baron P. Hill	96,654	51%	Mike Sodrel	87,169	46%	Jeff Melton	Green	2,745	2%	Al Cox	Libertarian	2,389	1%
2004	Baron P. Hill	140,772	49%	Mike Sodrel	142,197	49%	Al Cox	Libertarian	4,541	2%				
2006	Baron P. Hill	110,454	50%	Mike Sodrel	100,469	46%	D. Eric Schansberg	Libertarian	9,893	4%	Donald W. Mantooth	Write-in/independent	33	
2008	Baron P. Hill	181,281	58%	Mike Sodrel	120,529	38%	D. Eric Schansberg	Libertarian	11,994	4%				
2010	Baron P. Hill	95,353	42%	Todd Young	118,040	52%	Gregg "No Bull" Knott	Libertarian	12,070		Jerry R. Lucas	Write-in/independent	69	

== Post-congressional career ==
In 2011, after leaving Congress, Hill was hired by APCO Worldwide, "as a senior vice president in the company's government relations practice and a member of the firm's international advisory council."

APCO represents a number of clients listed in Lobbying Disclosure Act filings. In 2014, Hill left APCO to start his own solo lobbying firm, representing Cook Industries, a company located in his former district.

== 2016 election for U.S. Senate ==
In 2014, Hill announced he was considering running for Governor in 2016.

Following an announcement by Senator Dan Coats that he would not seek reelection, however, Hill announced on May 15, 2015, that he would seek the open Senate seat as the Democratic nominee. Democratic state Representative Christina Hale considered running for the seat as well, but ultimately decided against it.

Former Governor Evan Bayh, who from 1999 to 2011 served in the Senate in the same seat held by Coats, initially opted against joining the race. Hill therefore ran unopposed for the Democratic nomination, setting up a rematch with Todd Young. However, Hill withdrew from the general election on July 11, 2016, in favor of Bayh, who announced he was entering the race. Young won the general election on November 8, 2016.

== Personal life ==
Hill is married to Betty Hill (née Schepman), a public-school math teacher. They have three adult daughters.

Hill is a Methodist and a member of the First United Methodist Church in Seymour.

Party political offices
Preceded by Jill Long Thompson	Democratic nominee for U.S. Senator from Indiana (Class 3); 1990	Succeeded by Joe Hogsett
Preceded by Jim Turner	Chair of the Blue Dog Coalition for Communications; 2003–2005; Served alongside: Jim Turner (Administration), Charles Stenholm (Policy)	Succeeded by Dennis Cardoza
Preceded by Dennis Moore	Chair of the Blue Dog Coalition for Policy; 2009–2011; Served alongside: Stephanie Herseth Sandlin (Administration), Charlie Melancon, Jim Matheson (Communications)	Succeeded by John Barrow
Preceded by Brad Ellsworth	Democratic nominee for U.S. Senator from Indiana (Class 3); Withdrew; 2016	Succeeded by Evan Bayh
U.S. House of Representatives
Preceded by Lee Hamilton	Member of the U.S. House of Representatives from Indiana's 9th congressional district 1999–2005	Succeeded by Mike Sodrel
Preceded by Mike Sodrel	Member of the U.S. House of Representatives from Indiana's 9th congressional district 2007–2011	Succeeded by Todd Young
U.S. order of precedence (ceremonial)
Preceded by John P. Hiler as Former U.S. Representative	Order of precedence of the United States as Former U.S. Representative	Succeeded by David R. Bowen as Former U.S. Representative
