= Bill Bailey (Indiana politician) =

American businessman and politician

William W. Bailey

Member of the Indiana House of Representatives from the 66th district
- In office November 7, 1990 – November 8, 2000
- Preceded by: Baron Hill
- Succeeded by: Terry Goodin

Personal details
- Born: August 1, 1948 (age 78)
- Party: Democratic
- Spouse: Lisa Siefker Bailey
- Education: Murray State University

William W. Bailey (born August 1, 1948) is an American businessman and politician. He is a member of the Democratic Party.

From Seymour, Indiana, Bailey graduated from Murray State University where he was a founding member of the Sigma Pi fraternity chapter. After graduation, he was in the real estate and marketing businesses. Bailey was a Democratic member of the Indiana House of Representatives from 1990 to 2000. Bailey is also the former mayor of Seymour, Indiana (1983 to 1990) and had also served on Seymour City Council (1976 to 1980). Bailey is currently the president of the Greater Seymour Chamber of Commerce. Bailey ran for Congress in Indiana's 9th congressional district during the 2014 House of Representative elections against two-term incumbent Todd Young, losing to Young 63–33.
