= 2016 United States Senate election in Indiana =

- November 8, 2016
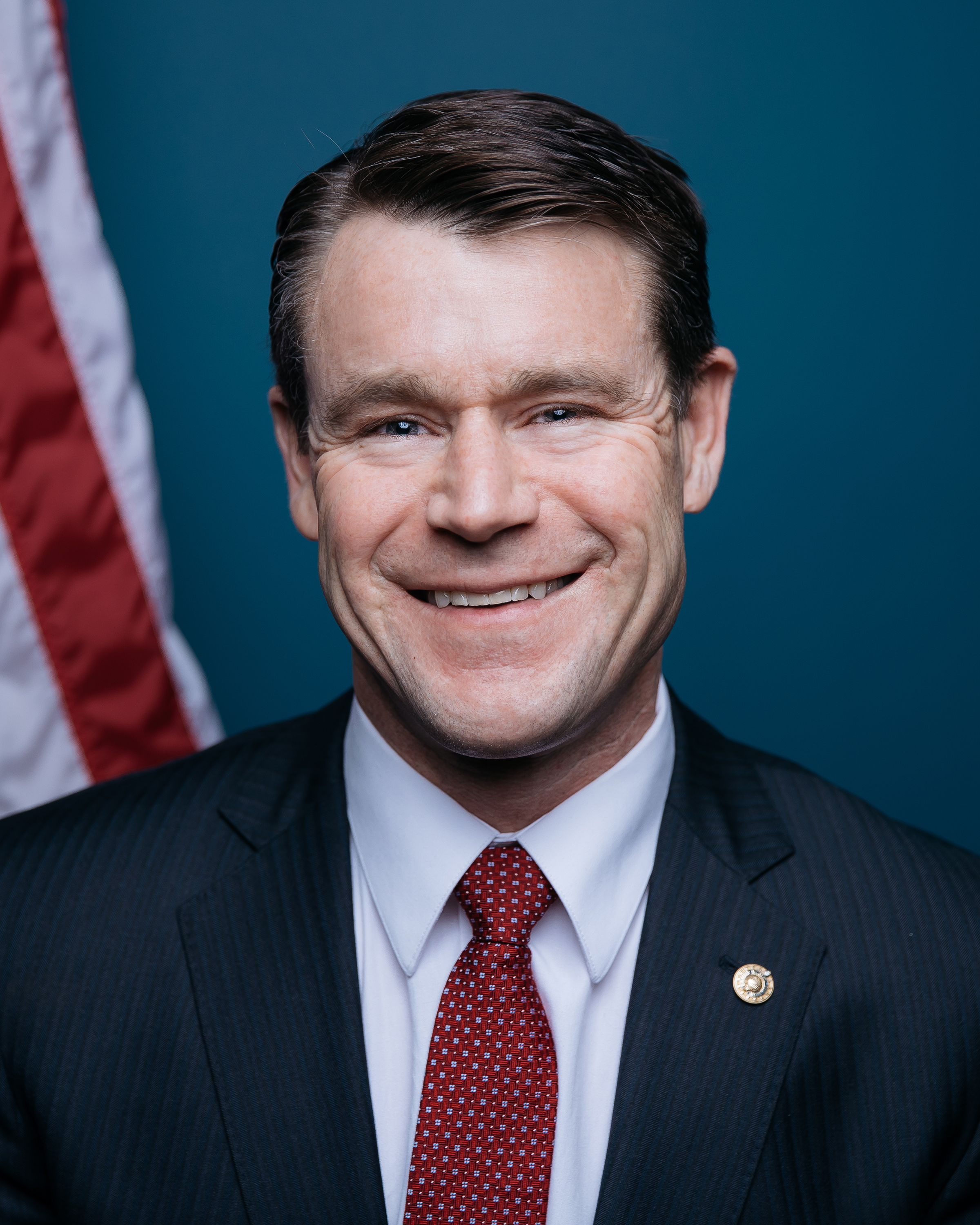

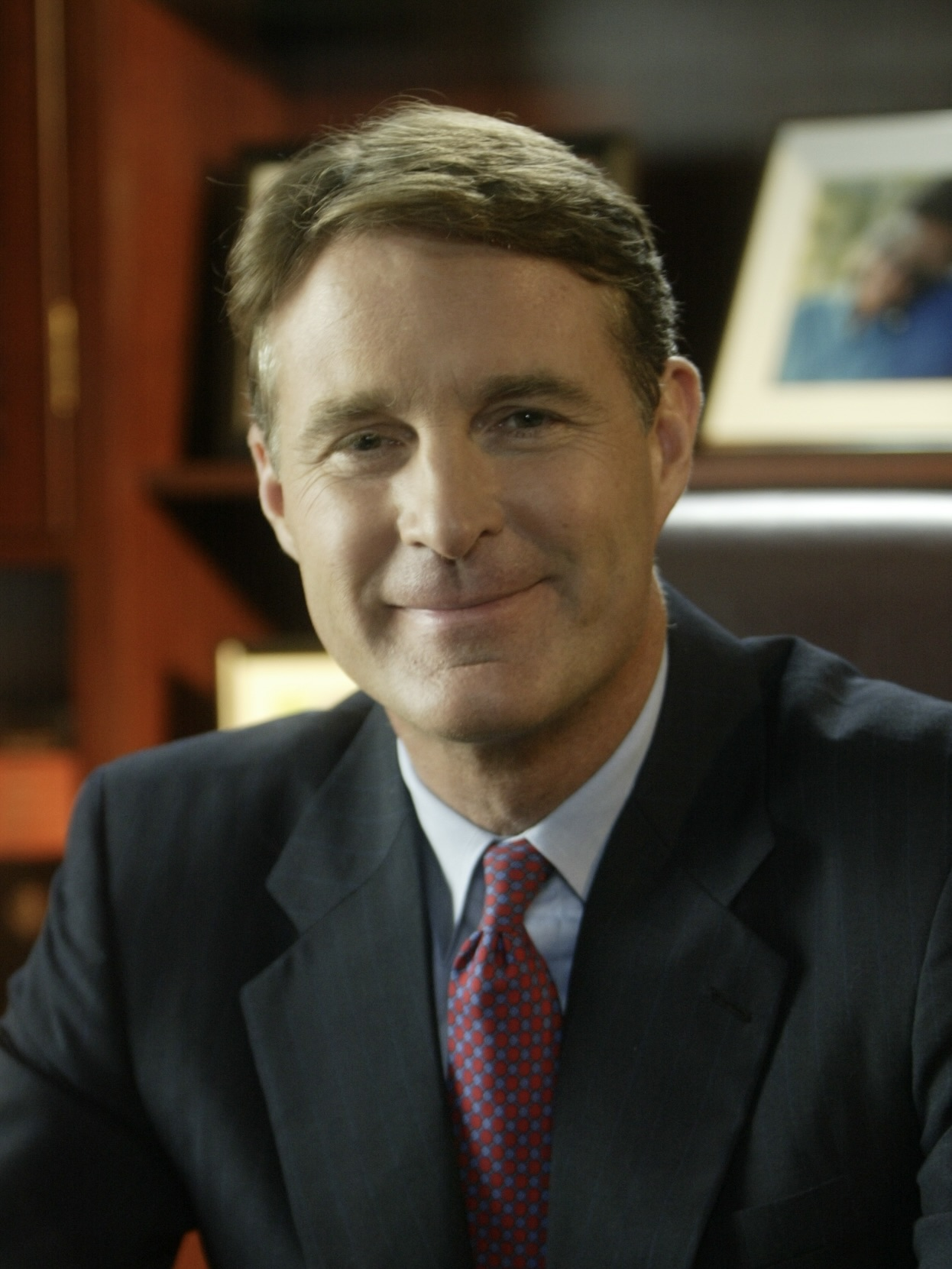

Nominee	Todd Young	Evan Bayh (Note: Replacing Baron Hill.)	Lucy Brenton
Party	Republican	Democratic	Libertarian
Popular vote	1,423,991	1,158,974	149,481
Percentage	52.11%	42.41%	5.47%
- Young: 40–50% 50–60% 60–70% 70–80% 80–90% >90% Bayh: 40–50% 50–60% 60–70% 70–80% 80–90% >90% Tie: 40–50% 50% No data
U.S. senator before election
Dan Coats
Republican
Elected U.S. Senator
Todd Young
Republican

The 2016 United States Senate election in Indiana was held on November 8, 2016, to elect a member of the United States Senate to represent the State of Indiana. The election was held alongside the presidential election and 2016 Indiana elections.

Republican incumbent Dan Coats, who had served in the Senate since 2011 and previously from 1989 to 1999, ultimately chose to not seek reelection. U.S. Representative Todd Young won the May 3 Republican primary to succeed him, with former U.S. Representative Baron Hill winning the Democratic nomination. However, Hill withdrew from the race on July 11, with former senator Evan Bayh entering the race to regain the seat, which he held from 1999 to 2011.

The Indiana Democratic Party formally chose Bayh as Hill's replacement on July 22. Following his entry, Bayh was initially seen as the frontrunner in the race. However, during the campaign, he faced heavy criticism over his post-Senate career as a lobbyist, as well as questions about his residency in the state. Young ultimately won by a comfortable margin, defeating Bayh in the general election by 10 points.

== Background ==
Republican Senator Dan Coats, who had served in the Senate since 2011, and previously from 1989 to 1999, stated that he planned to run for re-election, but in March 2014 his chief of staff said that Coats had "decided not to decide whether to run again until after the [2014] midterm elections".

On March 24, 2015, Coats announced that he would not run for re-election, citing that he would be of advanced age (just under 80 years old) by the end of the 2017–2023 term, should he complete it.

== Republican primary ==
=== Candidates ===
==== Declared ====
- Marlin Stutzman, U.S. representative and candidate for the U.S. Senate in 2010
- Todd Young, U.S. representative

==== Withdrawn ====
- Kevin Grant, financial consultant and candidate for IN-04 in 2014 (running for IN-04)
- Eric Holcomb, Senator Coats' chief of staff and former chairman of the Indiana Republican Party (appointed and ran for lieutenant governor before replacing Mike Pence as the nominee for governor)

==== Declined ====
- Greg Ballard, former mayor of Indianapolis
- Jim Banks, state senator (running for IN-03)
- Brian Bosma, speaker of the Indiana House of Representatives
- Susan Brooks, U.S. representative and former United States attorney for the Southern District of Indiana (running for re-election)
- Larry Bucshon, U.S. representative (running for re-election)
- Dan Coats, incumbent U.S. senator
- Mitch Daniels, president of Purdue University and former governor of Indiana
- Mike Delph, state senator
- Richard Lugar, former U.S. senator
- Jim Merritt, state senator
- Luke Messer, U.S. representative (running for re-election)
- Mike Pence, governor of Indiana and former U.S. representative (running for vice president of the United States)
- Todd Rokita, U.S. representative and former secretary of state of Indiana (running for re-election)
- Jackie Walorski, U.S. representative (running for re-election)
- Greg Zoeller, Indiana attorney general (running for IN-09)

=== Endorsements ===
Marlin Stutzman
- Citizens United
- Club for Growth
- FreedomWorks
- Senate Conservatives Fund

=== Polling ===
Poll source	Date(s) administered	Sample size	Margin of error	Todd Young	Marlin Stutzman	Undecided
NBC/WSJ/Marist	April 26–28, 2016	645	± 3.9%	56%	24%	20%
IPFW/Downs Center	April 13–27, 2016	400	± 4.9%	42%	34%	24%
WTHR/Howey	April 18–21, 2016	507	± 4.0%	43%	31%	26%

=== Results ===
Results by county: Young—80–90% Young—70–80% Young—60–70% Young—50–60% Stutzman—50–60% Stutzman—60–70% Stutzman—70–80%

Republican primary results
Party	Candidate	Votes	%
Republican	Todd Young	661,136	67.0%
Republican	Marlin Stutzman	324,429	33.0%
Total votes		985,565	100.0%

== Democratic primary ==
=== Candidates ===
==== Declared ====
- Baron Hill, former U.S. representative and nominee for U.S. Senate in 1990 (withdrew after winning primary)

==== Withdrawn ====
- John Dickerson, former nonprofit organization director

==== Declined ====
- Pete Buttigieg, mayor of South Bend
- André Carson, U.S. representative (running for re-election)
- Brad Ellsworth, former U.S. representative and nominee for the U.S. Senate in 2010
- John Gregg, former speaker of the Indiana House of Representatives and nominee for governor in 2012 (running for governor)
- Christina Hale, state representative (running for lieutenant governor)
- Thomas McDermott Jr., mayor of Hammond
- Bart Peterson, former mayor of Indianapolis
- Glenda Ritz, Indiana superintendent of public instruction (running for re-election)
- Jonathan Weinzapfel, former mayor of Evansville and nominee for Indiana's 8th congressional district in 1996

=== Endorsements ===
Baron Hill

Individuals

- Evan Bayh, former U.S. senator for this seat and former governor of Indiana, replacement nominee

Organizations

- Democratic Senatorial Campaign Committee

=== Results ===
Democratic primary results
Party	Candidate	Votes	%
Democratic	Baron Hill	516,183	100.00%
Total votes		516,183	100.00%

== Democratic State Central Committee selection ==
On July 11, 2016, CNN's Tom LoBianco announced that Bayh would enter the race to regain his old Senate seat and Hill would drop out and withdraw his name from the November ballot. Hill soon released a statement formally dropping out of the race, saying he did not "...want to stand in the way of Democrats winning Indiana and the U.S. Senate. That would not be fair to my party or my state. And, the stakes are far too high in this election not to put my country above my own political ambitions," without explicitly endorsing Bayh. The first candidate to declare was Bob Kern, a frequent candidate for Congress in various districts around the state. Bayh officially declared for the race July 13. The Indiana Democratic Party's State Central Committee chose Bayh as Hill's replacement, for the general election.

=== Candidates ===
- Evan Bayh, former U.S. senator and governor of Indiana
- Bob Kern, candidate for IN-7 in 2012, IN-2 in 2014, and IN-9 2016

== General election ==
=== Candidates ===
- Evan Bayh (D), former U.S. senator and governor of Indiana
- Lucy Brenton (L)
- Todd Young (R), U.S. representative

=== Debates ===
Dates	Location	Young	Bayh	Brenton	Link
October 18, 2016	Indianapolis, Indiana	Participant	Participant	Participant	

=== Endorsements ===
Evan Bayh

U.S. cabinet members and cabinet-level officials

- Hillary Clinton, 67th United States secretary of state, former U.S. senator from New York, 2008 presidential candidate and 2016 presidential nominee

Mayors

- Tom Henry, Fort Wayne, Indiana

Organizations

- Daily News Bin

Labor unions

- UAW - United Automobile Workers

Newspapers

- The Journal Gazette
- South Bend Tribune
Todd Young

Presidents of the United States

- George W. Bush, 43rd president of the United States

U.S. senators

- Tom Cotton, Arkansas
- Ted Cruz, Texas and 2016 presidential candidate

U.S. representatives

- Paul Ryan, Wisconsin, 54th speaker of the House and 2012 vice presidential nominee

Former state party chairs

- Al Hubbard
- Jim Kittle

Individuals

- Carly Fiorina, former CEO of Hewlett-Packard, 2010 nominee for Senate in California and 2016 presidential candidate

Organizations

- American Conservative Union
- Indiana Right to Life
- National Federation of Independent Business
- National Rifle Association - Political Victory Fund
- United States Chamber of Commerce

Newspapers

- The Indianapolis Star
- The Times of Northwest Indiana

=== Predictions ===
Source	Ranking	As of
The Cook Political Report	Tossup	November 2, 2016
Sabato's Crystal Ball	Lean R	November 7, 2016
Rothenberg Political Report	Tossup	November 3, 2016
Daily Kos	Tossup	November 8, 2016
Real Clear Politics	Tossup	November 7, 2016

=== Polling ===
View source data.

Poll source	Date(s) administered	Sample size	Margin of error	Todd Young (R)	Evan Bayh (D)	Lucy Brenton (L)	Undecided
SurveyMonkey	November 1–7, 2016	1,700	± 4.6%	53%	42%	—	5%
SurveyMonkey	Oct 31–Nov 6, 2016	1,383	± 4.6%	52%	43%	—	5%
WTHR/Howey	November 1–3, 2016	600	± 4.0%	46%	41%	6%	7%
SurveyMonkey	Oct 28–Nov 3, 2016	923	± 4.6%	52%	43%	—	5%
SurveyMonkey	Oct 27–Nov 2, 2016	790	± 4.6%	51%	44%	—	5%
Gravis Marketing	Oct 30–Nov 1, 2016	399	± 4.9%	37%	40%	7%	16%
SurveyMonkey	Oct 26–Nov 1, 2016	638	± 4.6%	51%	46%	—	3%
SurveyMonkey	October 25–31, 2016	674	± 4.6%	50%	46%	—	4%
Monmouth University	October 27–30, 2016	402	± 4.9%	45%	45%	4%	5%
Gravis Marketing	October 22–24, 2016	596	± 2.3%	37%	39%	7%	17%
WISH/Ball State Hoosier Survey	October 10–16, 2016	544	± 3.9%	43%	49%	—	6%
Monmouth University	October 11–13, 2016	402	± 4.9%	42%	48%	6%	4%
Public Opinion Strategies (R-Young)	October 9–11, 2016	609	± 4.0%	40%	39%	8%	13%
The Times-Picayune/Lucid	October 7–10, 2016	1,123	± 3.0%	43%	46%	—	11%
WTHR/Howey	October 3–5, 2016	600	± 4.0%	41%	42%	8%	9%
Public Opinion Strategies (R-Young)	October 3, 2016	–	–	38%	42%	7%	13%
Public Opinion Strategies (R-Young)	September 21, 2016	–	–	39%	44%	9%	8%
WTHR/Howey	September 6–8, 2016	600	± 4.0%	40%	44%	5%	11%
Public Opinion Strategies (R-Young)	September 1, 2016	–	–	35%	44%	6%	15%
Garin-Hart-Yang (D-Bayh)	August 15–18, 2016	801	± 3.5%	39%	55%	—	6%
Monmouth University	August 13–16, 2016	403	± 4.9%	41%	48%	4%	7%
Global Strategy Group (D-SMP)	August 10–14, 2016	801	± 3.5%	36%	54%	—	10%
Public Opinion Strategies (R-Young)	August 8, 2016	–	–	35%	48%	7%	10%
Expedition Strategies (R-Gregg)	August 1–3, 2016	600	± 4.0%	32%	58%	—	9%
Garin-Hart-Yang (D-DSCC)	July 12–14, 2016	602	± 4.1%	33%	54%	—	13%

Hypothetical polling

with Baron Hill

Poll source	Date(s) administered	Sample size	Margin of error	Todd Young (R)	Baron Hill (D)	Undecided
Bellwether Research	May 11–15, 2016	600	± 4.0%	36%	22%	30%
WTHR/Howey	April 18–21, 2016	500	± 4.3%	48%	30%	22%

with Marlin Stutzman

Poll source	Date(s) administered	Sample size	Margin of error	Marlin Stutzman (R)	Baron Hill (D)	Undecided
WTHR/Howey	April 18–21, 2016	500	± 4.0%	39%	36%	25%

=== Results ===
United States Senate election in Indiana, 2016
Party	Candidate	Votes	%	±%
Republican	Todd Young	1,423,991	52.11%	−2.47%
Democratic	Evan Bayh	1,158,947	42.41%	+2.41%
Libertarian	Lucy Brenton	149,481	5.47%	+0.06%
Independent	James L. Johnson, Jr. (write-in)	127	0.01%	N/A
Total votes		2,732,546	100.00%	N/A
Republican hold				

==== Results by county ====
County	Todd Young Republican		Evan Bayh Democratic		Lucy Brenton Libertarian		Write-ins		Margin		Total
County	Votes	%	Votes	%	Votes	%	Votes	%	Votes	%	Total
Adams	8,430	64.2%	3,840	29.2%	866	6.6%	0	0.0%	4,590	35.0%	13,136
Allen	79,370	53.7%	59,868	40.5%	8,503	5.8%	3	0.0%	19,502	13.2%	147,744
Bartholomew	19,050	59.1%	11,355	35.2%	1,839	5.7%	0	0.0%	7,695	23.9%	32,244
Benton	2,316	62.7%	1,132	30.6%	246	6.7%	0	0.0%	1,184	32.1%	3,694
Blackford	2,748	57.0%	1,707	35.4%	365	7.6%	0	0.0%	1,041	21.6%	4,820
Boone	19,966	61.9%	10,583	32.8%	1,715	5.3%	0	0.0%	9,383	29.1%	32,264
Brown	4,616	57.8%	2,907	36.4%	462	5.8%	0	0.0%	1,709	21.4%	7,985
Carroll	5,512	63.5%	2,522	29.0%	648	7.5%	0	0.0%	2,990	34.5%	8,682
Cass	8,306	58.3%	4,927	34.6%	1,013	7.1%	0	0.0%	3,379	23.7%	14,246
Clark	27,684	54.2%	21,414	41.9%	1,995	3.9%	0	0.0%	6,270	12.3%	51,093
Clay	6,439	57.9%	3,979	35.8%	697	6.3%	0	0.0%	2,460	22.1%	11,115
Clinton	7,291	62.2%	3,693	31.5%	740	6.3%	0	0.0%	3,598	30.7%	11,724
Crawford	2,500	54.8%	1,890	41.5%	169	3.7%	0	0.0%	610	13.3%	4,559
Daviess	7,096	66.5%	3,131	29.3%	450	4.2%	0	0.0%	3,965	37.2%	10,677
Dearborn	17,288	73.6%	5,251	22.4%	953	4.1%	0	0.1%	12,037	51.2%	23,492
Decatur	7,301	66.8%	3,022	27.7%	603	5.5%	0	0.0%	4,279	39.1%	10,926
DeKalb	10,229	61.4%	5,029	30.2%	1,413	8.5%	0	0.0%	5,200	31.2%	16,671
Delaware	21,557	48.0%	20,578	45.8%	2,744	6.1%	4	0.1%	979	2.2%	44,883
Dubois	11,029	56.0%	7,692	39.1%	962	4.9%	0	0.0%	3,337	16.9%	19,683
Elkhart	39,291	59.4%	23,416	35.4%	3,398	5.1%	1	0.0%	15,875	24.0%	66,106
Fayette	5,602	59.7%	3,170	33.8%	609	6.5%	0	0.0%	2,432	25.9%	9,381
Floyd	20,735	55.2%	15,504	41.2%	1,349	3.6%	0	0.0%	5,231	14.0%	37,588
Fountain	4,982	66.4%	2,071	27.6%	449	6.0%	0	0.0%	2,911	38.8%	7,502
Franklin	7,926	72.6%	2,625	24.1%	359	3.3%	0	0.0%	5,301	48.5%	10,910
Fulton	5,076	60.3%	2,793	33.2%	552	6.6%	0	0.0%	2,283	27.1%	8,421
Gibson	9,220	59.4%	5,519	35.6%	776	5.0%	0	0.0%	3,701	23.8%	15,515
Grant	15,280	60.5%	8,345	33.0%	1,640	6.5%	1	0.0%	6,935	27.5%	25,266
Greene	7,866	57.7%	5,062	37.1%	699	5.1%	0	0.0%	2,804	20.6%	13,627
Hamilton	92,773	59.7%	55,708	35.9%	6,801	4.4%	0	0.0%	37,065	23.8%	155,282
Hancock	23,196	63.8%	10,775	29.6%	2,402	6.6%	0	0.0%	12,421	34.2%	36,373
Harrison	11,442	61.5%	6,580	35.4%	580	3.1%	1	0.0%	4,862	26.1%	18,603
Hendricks	46,722	62.3%	24,427	32.6%	3,888	5.1%	1	0.0%	22,295	29.7%	75,038
Henry	11,664	57.9%	6,915	34.3%	1,557	7.7%	0	0.0%	4,749	23.6%	20,136
Howard	20,402	55.0%	14,311	38.6%	2,377	6.3%	31	0.1%	6,091	16.4%	37,121
Huntington	9,941	63.1%	4,545	28.8%	1,280	8.1%	0	0.0%	5,396	34.3%	15,766
Jackson	11,269	64.0%	5,626	31.9%	721	4.1%	0	0.0%	5,643	32.1%	17,616
Jasper	8,556	64.6%	4,106	31.0%	574	4.3%	4	0.0%	4,450	33.6%	13,240
Jay	4,529	57.7%	2,721	34.7%	596	7.6%	0	0.0%	1,808	23.0%	7,846
Jefferson	7,541	56.2%	5,424	40.4%	463	3.4%	0	0.0%	2,117	15.8%	13,428
Jennings	6,949	62.2%	3,702	33.2%	515	4.6%	0	0.0%	3,247	29.0%	11,166
Johnson	43,317	64.7%	19,897	29.7%	3,719	5.5%	49	0.1%	23,420	35.0%	66,982
Knox	7,816	51.7%	6,503	43.0%	810	5.4%	0	0.0%	1,313	8.7%	15,129
Kosciusko	22,188	68.9%	8,025	24.9%	1,981	6.2%	0	0.0%	14,163	44.0%	32,194
LaGrange	6,222	64.7%	2,782	28.9%	618	6.4%	0	0.0%	3,440	35.8%	9,622
Lake	67,657	34.3%	122,036	61.9%	7,538	3.8%	1	0.0%	-54,379	-27.6%	197,232
LaPorte	19,733	43.9%	22,401	49.9%	2,766	6.2%	0	0.0%	-2,668	-6.0%	44,900
Lawrence	12,327	65.5%	5,493	29.2%	1,007	5.3%	0	0.0%	6,834	36.3%	18,827
Madison	28,057	52.0%	22,188	41.1%	3,689	6.8%	0	0.0%	5,869	10.9%	53,934
Marion	131,576	36.0%	213,483	58.5%	20,141	5.5%	0	0.0%	-81,907	-22.5%	365,206
Marshall	10,659	59.4%	6,223	34.7%	1,059	5.9%	0	0.0%	4,436	24.7%	17,941
Martin	2,934	61.3%	1,595	33.3%	261	5.4%	0	0.0%	1,339	28.0%	4,790
Miami	8,453	63.6%	3,836	28.9%	1,007	7.6%	0	0.0%	4,617	34.7%	13,296
Monroe	21,049	35.8%	34,241	58.3%	3,478	5.9%	0	0.0%	-13,192	-22.5%	58,768
Montgomery	9,808	64.6%	4,393	28.9%	976	6.4%	0	0.0%	5,415	35.7%	15,177
Morgan	21,193	68.3%	7,821	25.2%	2,011	6.5%	12	0.0%	13,372	43.1%	31,037
Newton	3,670	63.6%	1,788	31.0%	313	5.4%	0	0.0%	1,882	32.6%	5,771
Noble	10,509	62.8%	4,996	29.9%	1,217	7.3%	0	0.0%	5,513	32.9%	16,722
Ohio	1,948	67.3%	853	29.5%	95	3.3%	0	0.0%	1,095	37.8%	2,896
Orange	5,134	62.5%	2,795	34.0%	291	3.5%	0	0.0%	2,339	28.5%	8,220
Owen	5,333	62.5%	2,642	31.0%	557	6.5%	0	0.0%	2,691	31.5%	8,532
Parke	3,859	58.2%	2,339	35.3%	435	6.6%	0	0.0%	1,520	22.9%	6,633
Perry	3,612	45.2%	3,990	49.9%	388	4.9%	0	0.0%	-378	-4.7%	7,990
Pike	3,404	57.2%	2,228	37.5%	314	5.3%	0	0.0%	1,176	19.7%	5,946
Porter	35,629	46.4%	36,828	48.0%	4,266	5.6%	0	0.0%	-1,199	-1.6%	76,723
Posey	7,058	56.4%	4,857	38.8%	597	4.8%	0	0.0%	2,201	17.6%	12,512
Pulaski	3,109	58.2%	1,859	34.8%	372	7.0%	0	0.0%	1,250	23.4%	5,340
Putnam	9,510	64.7%	4,319	29.4%	861	5.9%	0	0.0%	5,191	35.3%	14,690
Randolph	6,411	62.5%	3,230	31.5%	614	6.0%	0	0.0%	3,181	31.0%	10,255
Ripley	9,227	71.7%	3,182	24.7%	464	3.6%	0	0.0%	6,045	47.0%	12,873
Rush	4,472	62.5%	2,238	31.3%	441	6.2%	0	0.0%	2,234	31.2%	7,151
Scott	5,046	55.5%	3,763	41.4%	288	3.2%	0	0.0%	1,283	14.1%	9,097
Shelby	11,267	62.8%	5,549	30.9%	1,113	6.2%	0	0.0%	5,718	31.9%	17,929
Spencer	5,465	55.3%	3,960	40.1%	458	4.6%	0	0.0%	1,505	15.2%	9,883
St. Joseph	47,353	42.7%	56,749	51.2%	6,782	6.1%	0	0.0%	-9,396	-8.5%	110,884
Starke	4,895	54.2%	3,443	38.1%	699	7.7%	0	0.0%	1,452	16.1%	9,037
Steuben	9,078	62.0%	4,546	31.0%	1,017	6.9%	0	0.0%	4,532	31.0%	14,641
Sullivan	4,164	49.3%	3,856	45.6%	429	5.1%	0	0.0%	308	3.7%	8,449
Switzerland	2,260	62.1%	1,242	34.1%	139	3.8%	0	0.0%	1,018	28.0%	3,641
Tippecanoe	30,081	47.7%	28,921	45.9%	4,013	6.4%	1	0.0%	1,160	1.8%	63,016
Tipton	4,760	63.3%	2,260	30.1%	496	6.6%	3	0.0%	2,500	33.2%	7,519
Union	2,252	68.5%	901	27.4%	136	4.1%	0	0.0%	1,351	41.1%	3,289
Vanderburgh	36,835	50.7%	32,077	44.1%	3,787	5.2%	0	0.0%	4,758	6.6%	72,699
Vermillion	3,247	47.1%	3,197	46.3%	455	6.6%	0	0.0%	50	0.8%	6,899
Vigo	15,681	41.6%	21,028	52.8%	2,227	5.6%	2	0.0%	-4,447	-11.2%	39,838
Wabash	8,595	64.3%	3,925	29.4%	848	6.3%	0	0.0%	4,670	34.9%	13,368
Warren	2,589	65.4%	1,159	29.3%	211	5.3%	0	0.0%	1,430	36.1%	3,959
Warrick	17,255	58.2%	11,092	37.4%	1,302	4.4%	7	0.0%	6,163	20.8%	29,656
Washington	7,197	63.3%	3,773	33.2%	405	3.6%	0	0.0%	3,424	30.1%	11,375
Wayne	14,703	57.2%	9,309	36.2%	1,678	6.5%	0	0.0%	5,394	21.0%	25,690
Wells	8,811	66.9%	3,516	26.7%	836	6.4%	0	0.0%	5,295	40.2%	13,163
White	6,128	60.8%	3,255	32.3%	700	6.9%	0	0.0%	2,873	28.5%	10,083
Whitley	9,865	63.3%	4,500	28.9%	1,208	7.8%	0	0.0%	5,365	34.4%	15,573
TOTAL	1,423,991	52.1%	1,158,947	42.4%	149,481	5.5%	127	0.0%	265,044	9.7%	2,732,546

Counties that flipped from Republican to Democratic

- Porter (largest city: Portage)
- St. Joseph (largest city: South Bend)

Counties that flipped from Democratic to Republican

- Vermillion (largest city: Clinton)
- Sullivan (largest city: Sullivan)

==== By congressional district ====
Young won seven of nine congressional districts.

District	Young	Bayh	Representative
1st	38%	58%	Pete Visclosky
2nd	53%	41%	Jackie Walorski
3rd	59%	35%	Marlin Stutzman
4th	59%	35%	Todd Rokita
5th	53%	42%	Susan Brooks
6th	61%	34%	Luke Messer
7th	35%	59%	André Carson
8th	53%	42%	Larry Bucshon
9th	56%	39%	Todd Young
