= Economic Freedom Fund =

527 group

The Economic Freedom Fund (EFF) is a 527 group started in 2006 by Bob J. Perry, with a $5 million donation. Only one person is officially associated with the group: Charles H. Bell Jr., a lawyer from California, who is the general counsel for the California Republican Party, and the Republican National Lawyers Association's vice president for the election education advisory council.

The $5 million initial donation makes the EFF one of the top ten 527 groups in the 2006 election cycle in terms of receipts.

EFF says its aim is to "educate the public concerning issues related to the preservation of economic freedom, the promotion of economic growth and prosperity for the people of the United States of America."

== Focus of efforts ==
All of EFF's campaign ads to date attack Democratic candidates. So far the attacks have been on:

- John Barrow (D-GA)
- Leonard Boswell (D-IA)
- Baron Hill (challenger in Indiana's 9th District)
- Jim Marshall (D-GA)
- Alan Mollohan (D-WV)
- Darlene Hooley (D-OR)

== Push polls ==
=== Indiana ===
In September 2006, the group may have violated a 1988 Indiana law that bars companies from placing a prerecorded, automated call to a person unless a real person, in a live conversation, first speaks and gets permission to play the recorded portion of the call. The calls were in support of incumbent Representative Mike Sodrel, and were a classic push poll, designed to smear Sodrel's opponent, Baron Hill, while appearing to be a legitimate survey. After at least seven complaints were made to the state attorney general's office, the campaign notified the office that they had halted the calls. The Indiana law allows for a penalty of up to $5,000 per violation (per call made, not per complaint).

In late September, FreeEats.com, the northern Virginia company that makes automated political phone calls, filed a lawsuit in federal court in Indianapolis, asking that the court direct the Indiana attorney general to stop enforcing the state law. The company argued that the state law violated free speech rights under the United States and Indiana constitutions, and that the ban was an unconstitutional restraint on interstate commerce.

Indiana attorney general Steve Carter sued the EFF earlier in September, in Brown County Circuit Court after receiving 12 consumer complaints about the calls. The state's lawsuit seeks injunctions to stop them and fines of $5,000 for each violation. A hearing in the case is set for September 27.

=== Other states ===
The group apparently used the same "push poll" approach in races in Iowa and Georgia in September 2006.

== See also ==
- Americans for Honesty on Issues
- Free Enterprise Fund
- Bob J. Perry
