= Indiana's 9th congressional district =

U.S. House district for Indiana

- Interactive map of district boundaries since January 3, 2023
- Representative: Erin Houchin; R–Salem
- Population (2025): 774,716
- Median household income: $70,717
- Ethnicity: 87.0% White; 4.1% Hispanic; 3.9% Two or more races; 2.8% Black; 1.7% Asian; 0.5% other
- Cook PVI: R+15

Indiana's 9th congressional district is a congressional district in the U.S. state of Indiana. Located in south-central and southeastern Indiana, the district includes the Indiana side of the Louisville metropolitan area. The district's largest city is Bloomington, home to Indiana University.

The district is currently represented by Erin Houchin, first elected in 2022.

== Recent election results from statewide races ==
Year	Office	Results
2008	President	McCain 52% - 46%
2012	President	Romney 58% - 42%
2012	Senate	Donnelly 47.3% - 47.2%
2012	Governor	Pence 53% - 43%
2016	President	Trump 61% - 33%
2016	Senate	Young 57% - 39%
2016	Governor	Holcomb 57% - 40%
2016	Attorney General	Hill 66% - 34%
2018	Senate	Braun 55% - 41%
2020	President	Trump 63% - 35%
2020	Governor	Holcomb 60% - 29%
2020	Attorney General	Rokita 64% - 36%
2022	Senate	Young 64% - 33%
2022	Treasurer	Elliott 65% - 35%
2022	Auditor	Klutz 64% - 33%
2022	Secretary of State	Morales 60% - 36%
2024	President	Trump 64% - 34%
2024	Senate	Banks 63% - 34%
2024	Governor	Braun 59% - 37%
2024	Attorney General	Rokita 64% - 36%

== Composition ==
For the 118th and successive Congresses (based on redistricting following the 2020 census), the district contains all or portions of the following counties and townships:

Bartholomew County (4)

Jackson, Ohio, Sand Creek (part, also 6th), Wayne

Brown County (4)

All four townships

Clark County (12)

All 12 townships

Dearborn County (14)

All 14 townships

Decatur County (9)

All nine townships

Floyd County (5)

All five townships

Franklin County (13)

All 13 townships

Harrison County (12)

All 12 townships

Jackson County (12)

All 12 townships

Jefferson County (10)

All 10 townships

Jennings County (11)

All 11 townships

Lawrence County (9)

All nine townships

Monroe County (11)

All 11 townships

Ohio County (4)

All four townships

Ripley County (11)

All 11 townships

Scott County (5)

All five townships

Switzerland County (6)

All six townships

Washington County (13)

All 13 townships

== List of members representing the district ==
Member	Party	Years	Cong ress	Electoral history
District created March 4, 1843
Samuel C. Sample (South Bend)	Whig	March 4, 1843 – March 3, 1845	28th	Elected in 1843. Lost re-election.
Charles W. Cathcart (Laporte)	Democratic	March 4, 1845 – March 3, 1849	29th 30th	Elected in 1845. Re-elected in 1847. Retired.
Graham N. Fitch (Logansport)	Democratic	March 4, 1849 – March 3, 1853	31st 32nd	Elected in 1849. Re-elected in 1851. Retired.
Norman Eddy (South Bend)	Democratic	March 4, 1853 – March 3, 1855	33rd	Elected in 1852. Lost re-election.
Schuyler Colfax (South Bend)	People's	March 4, 1855 – March 3, 1857	34th 35th 36th 37th 38th 39th 40th	Elected in 1854. Re-elected in 1856. Re-elected in 1858. Re-elected in 1860. Re-elected in 1862. Re-elected in 1864. Re-elected in 1866. Retired to run for U.S. Vice President.
Schuyler Colfax (South Bend)	Republican	March 4, 1857 – March 3, 1869	34th 35th 36th 37th 38th 39th 40th	Elected in 1854. Re-elected in 1856. Re-elected in 1858. Re-elected in 1860. Re-elected in 1862. Re-elected in 1864. Re-elected in 1866. Retired to run for U.S. Vice President.
John P. C. Shanks (Portland)	Republican	March 4, 1869 – March 3, 1875	41st 42nd 43rd	Redistricted from the 11th district and re-elected in 1868. Re-elected in 1870. Re-elected in 1872; Lost renomination.
Thomas J. Cason (Lebanon)	Republican	March 4, 1875 – March 3, 1877	44th	Redistricted from the 7th district and re-elected in 1874. Lost renomination.
Michael D. White (Crawfordsville)	Republican	March 4, 1877 – March 3, 1879	45th	Elected in 1876. Retired.
Godlove S. Orth (Lafayette)	Republican	March 4, 1879 – December 16, 1882	46th 47th	Elected in 1878. Re-elected in 1880. Lost re-election and died before next term began.
Vacant		December 16, 1882 – January 17, 1883	47th	
Charles T. Doxey (Anderson)	Republican	January 17, 1883 – March 3, 1883	47th	Elected to finish Orth's term. Was not a candidate for the next term.
Thomas B. Ward (Lafayette)	Democratic	March 4, 1883 – March 3, 1887	48th 49th	Elected in 1882. Re-elected in 1884. Retired.
Joseph B. Cheadle (Frankfort)	Republican	March 4, 1887 – March 3, 1891	50th 51st	Elected in 1886. Re-elected in 1888. Lost renomination.
Daniel W. Waugh (Tipton)	Republican	March 4, 1891 – March 3, 1895	52nd 53rd	Elected in 1890. Re-elected in 1892. Retired.
Frank Hanly (Williamsport)	Republican	March 4, 1895 – March 3, 1897	54th	Elected in 1894. Lost renomination.
Charles B. Landis (Delphi)	Republican	March 4, 1897 – March 3, 1909	55th 56th 57th 58th 59th 60th	Elected in 1896. Re-elected in 1898. Re-elected in 1900. Re-elected in 1902. Re-elected in 1904. Re-elected in 1906. Lost re-election.
Martin A. Morrison (Frankfort)	Democratic	March 4, 1909 – March 3, 1917	61st 62nd 63rd 64th	Elected in 1908. Re-elected in 1910. Re-elected in 1912. Re-elected in 1914. Retired.
Fred S. Purnell (Attica)	Republican	March 4, 1917 – March 3, 1933	65th 66th 67th 68th 69th 70th 71st 72nd	Elected in 1916. Re-elected in 1918. Re-elected in 1920. Re-elected in 1922. Re-elected in 1924. Re-elected in 1926. Re-elected in 1928. Re-elected in 1930. Redistricted to the 6th district and lost re-election.
Eugene B. Crowe (Bedford)	Democratic	March 4, 1933 – January 3, 1941	73rd 74th 75th 76th	Redistricted from the 3rd district and re-elected in 1932. Re-elected in 1934. Re-elected in 1936. Re-elected in 1938. Lost re-election.
Earl Wilson (Bedford)	Republican	January 3, 1941 – January 3, 1959	77th 78th 79th 80th 81st 82nd 83rd 84th 85th	Elected in 1940. Re-elected in 1942. Re-elected in 1944. Re-elected in 1946. Re-elected in 1948. Re-elected in 1950. Re-elected in 1952. Re-elected in 1954. Re-elected in 1956. Lost re-election.
Earl Hogan (Hope)	Democratic	January 3, 1959 – January 3, 1961	86th	Elected in 1958. Lost re-election.
Earl Wilson (Bedford)	Republican	January 3, 1961 – January 3, 1965	87th 88th	Elected in 1960. Re-elected in 1962. Lost re-election.
Lee Hamilton (Nashville)	Democratic	January 3, 1965 – January 3, 1999	89th 90th 91st 92nd 93rd 94th 95th 96th 97th 98th 99th 100th 101st 102nd 103rd 104th 105th	Elected in 1964. Re-elected in 1966. Re-elected in 1968. Re-elected in 1970. Re-elected in 1972. Re-elected in 1974. Re-elected in 1976. Re-elected in 1978. Re-elected in 1980. Re-elected in 1982. Re-elected in 1984. Re-elected in 1986. Re-elected in 1988. Re-elected in 1990. Re-elected in 1992. Re-elected in 1994. Re-elected in 1996. Retired.
Baron Hill (Seymour)	Democratic	January 3, 1999 – January 3, 2005	106th 107th 108th	Elected in 1998. Re-elected in 2000. Re-elected in 2002. Lost re-election.
Mike Sodrel (New Albany)	Republican	January 3, 2005 – January 3, 2007	109th	Elected in 2004. Lost re-election.
Baron Hill (Seymour)	Democratic	January 3, 2007 – January 3, 2011	110th 111th	Elected again in 2006. Re-elected in 2008. Lost re-election.
Todd Young (Bloomington)	Republican	January 3, 2011 – January 3, 2017	112th 113th 114th	Elected in 2010. Re-elected in 2012. Re-elected in 2014. Retired to run for U.S. Senator.
Trey Hollingsworth (Jeffersonville)	Republican	January 3, 2017 – January 3, 2023	115th 116th 117th	Elected in 2016. Re-elected in 2018. Re-elected in 2020. Retired.
Erin Houchin (Salem)	Republican	January 3, 2023 – present	118th 119th	Elected in 2022. Re-elected in 2024. Re-elected in 2026.

== Recent election results ==
=== 2002 ===
2002 election
- November 5, 2002
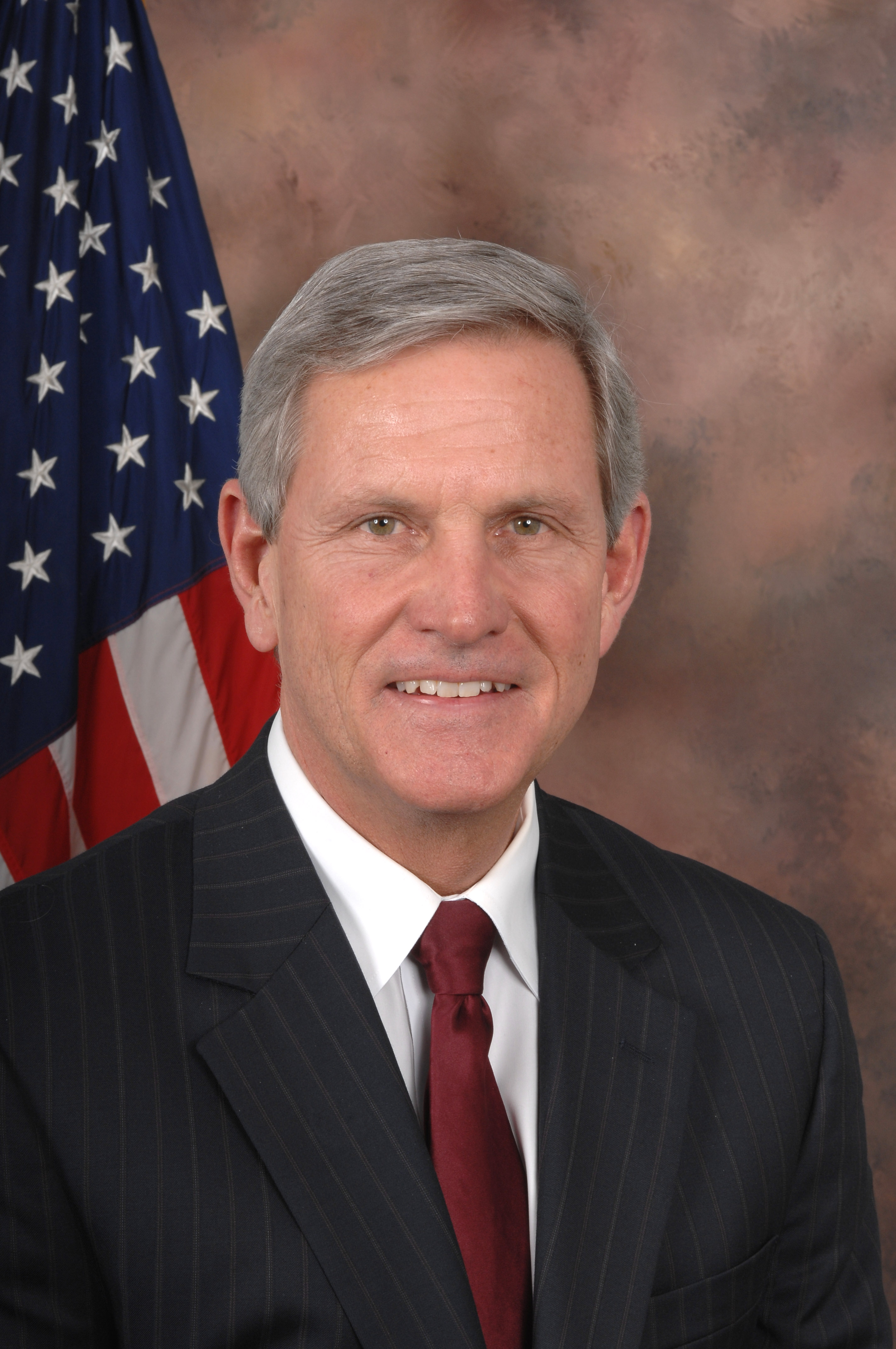

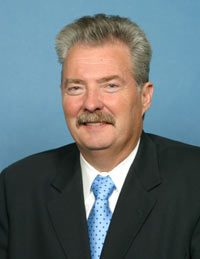
Nominee	Baron Hill	Mike Sodrel
Party	Democratic	Republican
Popular vote	96,654	87,169
Percentage	51.15%	46.13%
U.S. Representative before election
Baron Hill
Democratic
Elected U.S. Representative
Baron Hill
Democratic

Indiana's 9th Congressional District election (2002)
Party	Candidate	Votes	%
Democratic	Baron Hill (incumbent)	96,654	51.15
Republican	Mike Sodrel	87,169	46.13
Green	Jeff Melton	2,745	1.45
Libertarian	Alan G. Cox	2,389	1.26
Total votes		188,957	100.00
Democratic hold			

=== 2004 ===
2004 election
- November 2, 2004
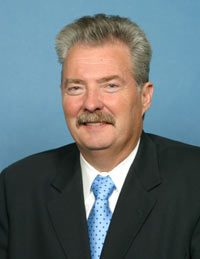

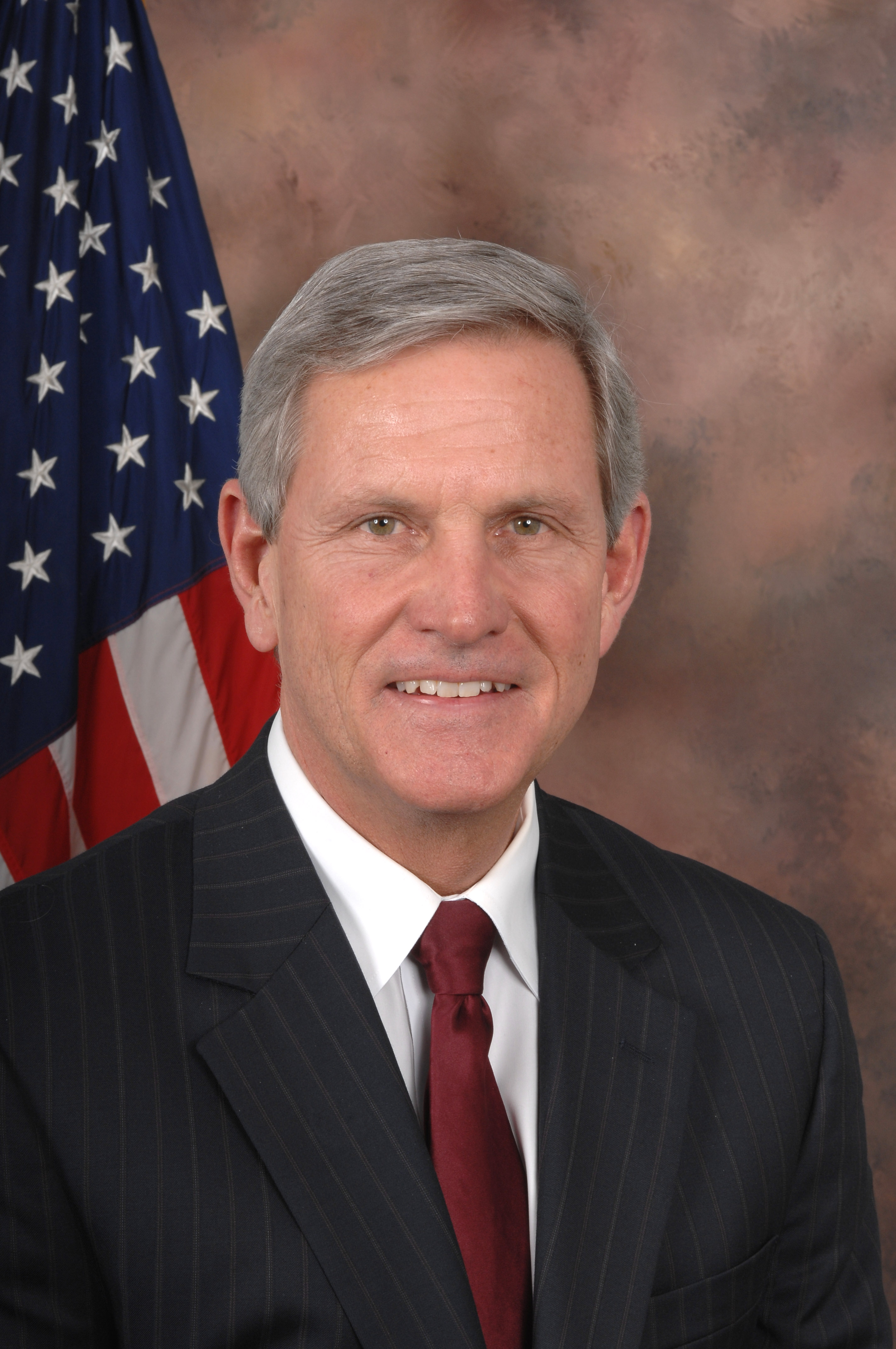
Nominee	Mike Sodrel	Baron Hill
Party	Republican	Democratic
Popular vote	142,247	140,819
Percentage	49.43%	48.94%
U.S. Representative before election
Baron Hill
Democratic
Elected U.S. Representative
Mike Sodrel
Republican

Indiana's 9th Congressional District election (2004)
Party	Candidate	Votes	%
Republican	Mike Sodrel	142,247	49.43
Democratic	Baron Hill (incumbent)	140,819	48.94
Libertarian	Alan G. Cox	4,698	1.63
Total votes		287,764	100.00
Republican gain from Democratic			

=== 2006 ===
2006 election
- November 7, 2006
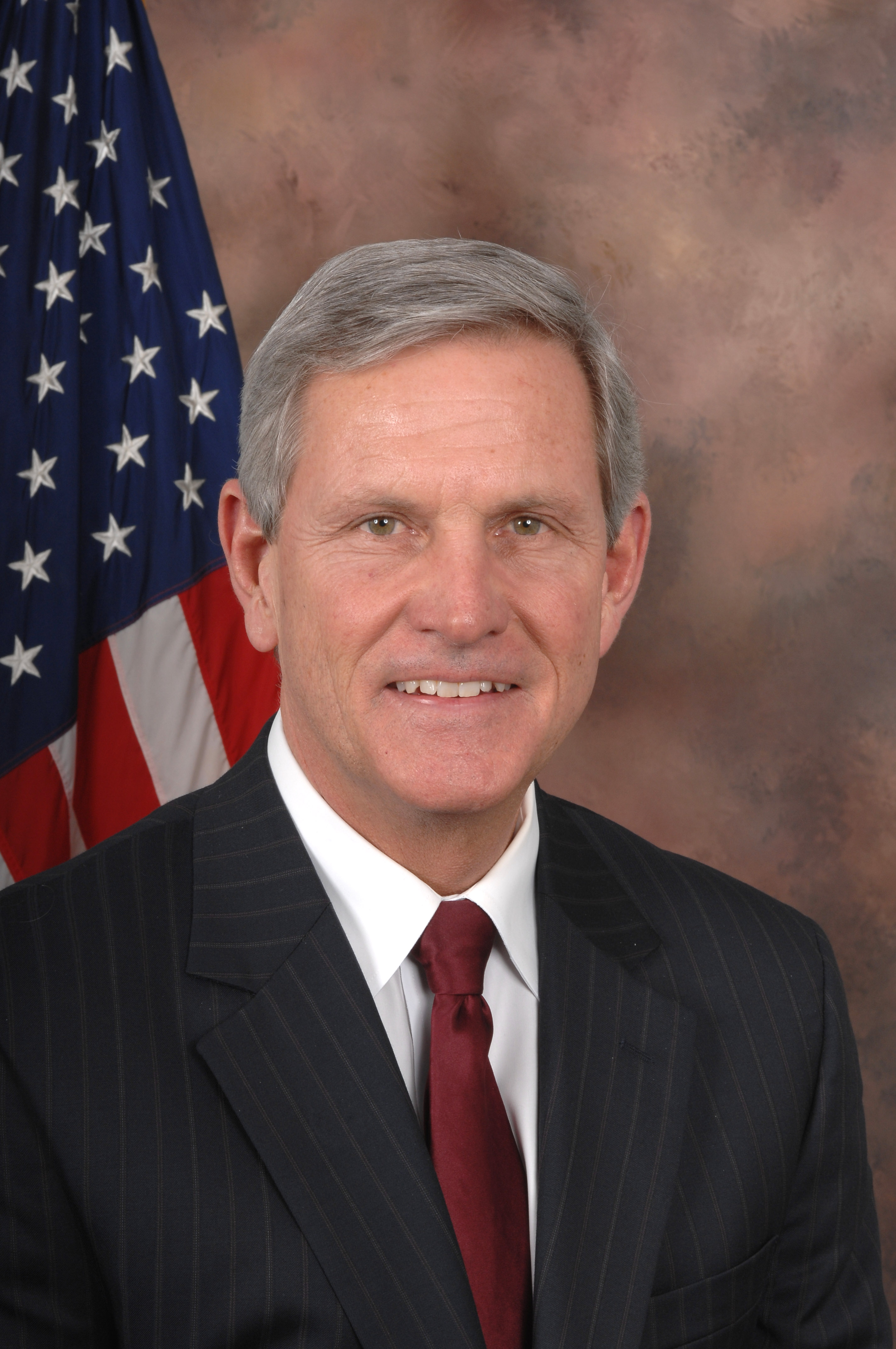

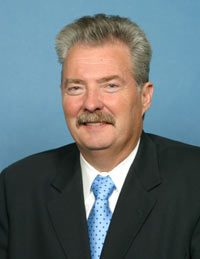
Nominee	Baron Hill	Mike Sodrel
Party	Democratic	Republican
Popular vote	110,454	100,469
Percentage	50.01%	45.49%
U.S. Representative before election
Mike Sodrel
Republican
Elected U.S. Representative
Baron Hill
Democratic

Indiana's 9th Congressional District election (2006)
Party	Candidate	Votes	%
Democratic	Baron Hill	110,454	50.01
Republican	Mike Sodrel (incumbent)	100,469	45.49
Libertarian	D. Eric Schansberg	9,893	4.48
No party	Others	34	0.02
Total votes		220,850	100.00
Democratic gain from Republican			

=== 2008 ===
2008 election
- November 4, 2008
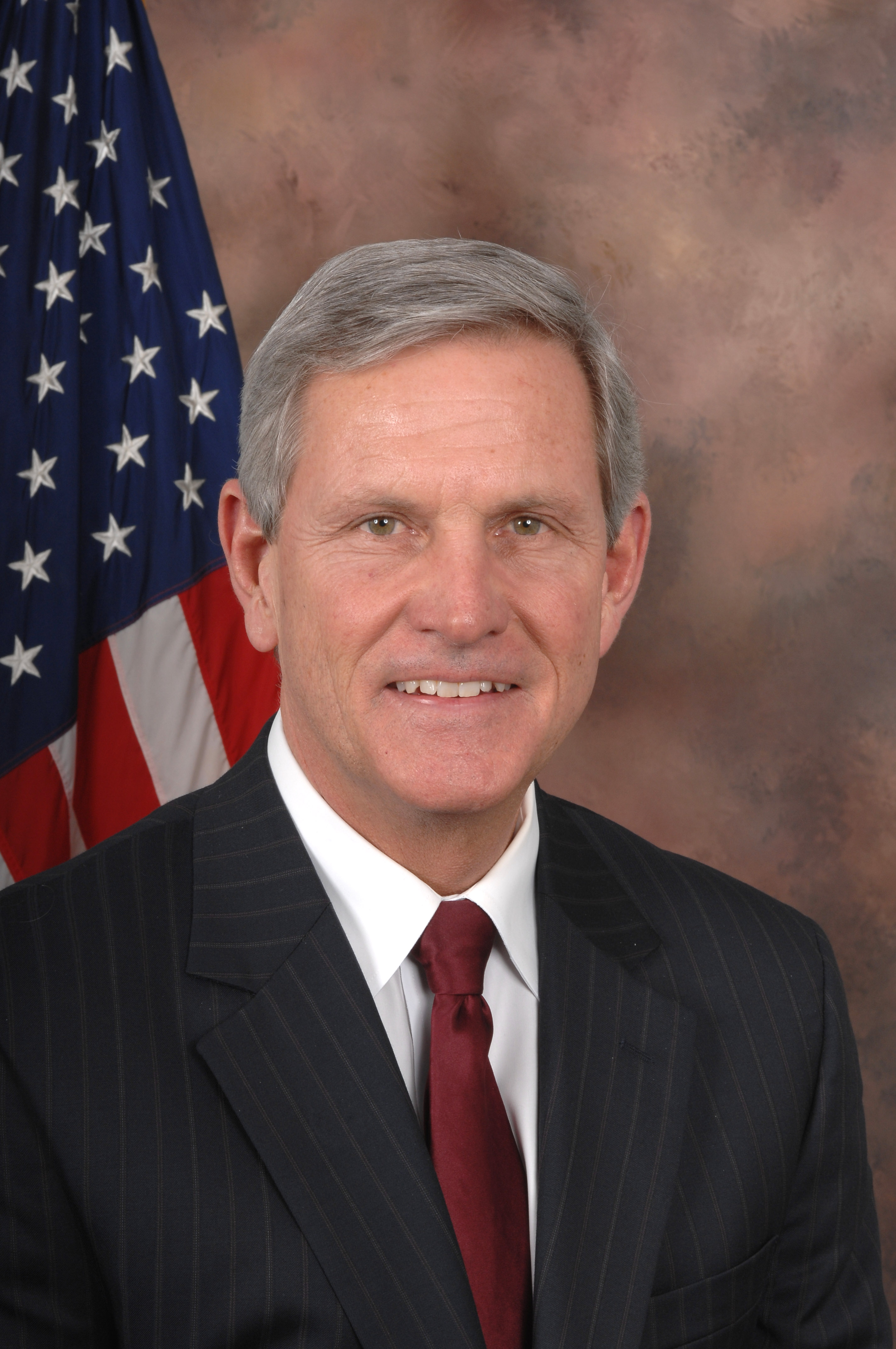

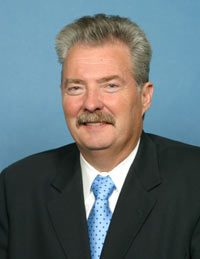
Nominee	Baron Hill	Mike Sodrel
Party	Democratic	Republican
Popular vote	181,256	120,517
Percentage	57.77%	38.41%
U.S. Representative before election
Baron Hill
Democratic
Elected U.S. Representative
Baron Hill
Democratic

Indiana's 9th Congressional District election (2008)
Party	Candidate	Votes	%
Democratic	Baron Hill (incumbent)	181,256	57.77
Republican	Mike Sodrel	120,517	38.41
Libertarian	D. Eric Schansberg	12,000	3.82
Total votes		313,773	100.00
Democratic hold			

=== 2010 ===
Indiana's 9th Congressional District election (2010)
Party	Candidate	Votes	%
Republican	Todd Young	118,040	52.34
Democratic	Baron Hill (incumbent)	95,353	42.28
Libertarian	Greg "No Bull" Knott	12,070	5.35
No party	Others	69	0.03
Total votes		225,532	100.00
Republican gain from Democratic			

=== 2012 ===
Indiana's 9th Congressional District election (2012)
Party	Candidate	Votes	%
Republican	Todd Young (incumbent)	165,332	55.45
Democratic	Shelli Yoder	132,848	44.55
Total votes		298,180	100.00
Turnout			57
Republican hold			

=== 2014 ===
Indiana's 9th Congressional District election, 2014
Party	Candidate	Votes	%
Republican	Todd Young (incumbent)	101,594	62.18
Democratic	Bill Bailey	55,016	33.67
Libertarian	Mike Frey	6,777	4.15
Total votes		163,387	100.00
Turnout			31
Republican hold			

=== 2016 ===
Indiana's 9th Congressional District election, 2016
Party	Candidate	Votes	%
Republican	Trey Hollingsworth	174,791	54.14
Democratic	Shelli Yoder	130,627	40.46
Libertarian	Russell Brooksbank	17,425	5.40
Total votes		322,843	100.00
Turnout			58
Republican hold			

=== 2018 ===
Indiana's 9th Congressional District election, 2018
Party	Candidate	Votes	%
Republican	Trey Hollingsworth (incumbent)	153,271	56.5
Democratic	Liz Watson	118,090	43.5
Total votes		271,361	100.00
Republican hold			

=== 2020 ===
Indiana's 9th congressional district election, 2020
Party	Candidate	Votes	%
Republican	Trey Hollingsworth (incumbent)	222,057	61.8
Democratic	Andy Ruff	122,566	34.1
Libertarian	Tonya Lynn Millis	14,415	4.0
Total votes		359,038	100.0
Republican hold			

=== 2022 ===
Indiana's 9th congressional district election, 2022
Party	Candidate	Votes	%
Republican	Erin Houchin	143,166	63.6
Democratic	Matthew Fyfe	75,700	33.6
Libertarian	Tonya Lynn Millis	6,374	2.8
Write-In	Jacob Bailey	36	0.016
Total votes		225,276	100.0
Republican hold			

=== 2024 ===
Indiana's 9th Congressional District election, 2024
Party	Candidate	Votes	%
Republican	Erin Houchin {incumbent}	222,884	64.5
Democratic	Timothy Peck	113,400	32.8
Libertarian	Russell Brooksbank	9,454	2.7
Total votes		345,738	100.00
Turnout			58
Republican hold			

== Historical district boundaries ==
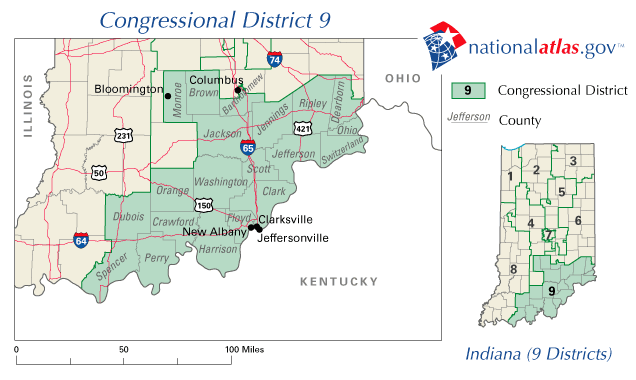
2003 – 2013

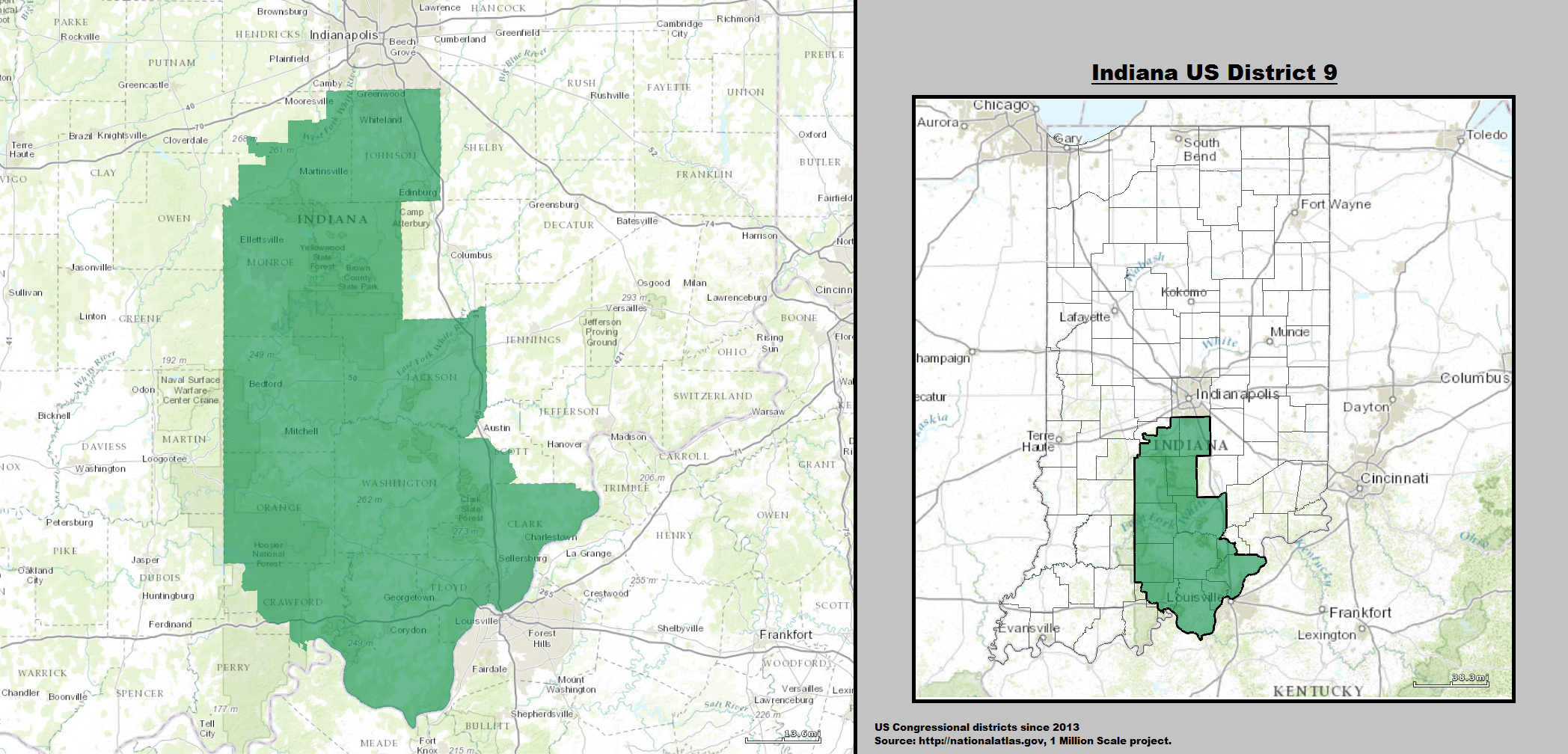
2013 – 2023

== In popular culture ==
In a May 2020 special episode of the comedy series Parks and Recreation, the district is shown as being represented by Ben Wyatt (D-Pawnee; portrayed by Adam Scott).

== See also ==
- Indiana's congressional districts
- List of United States congressional districts

U.S. House of Representatives
Preceded by Pennsylvania's 14th congressional district	Home district of the speaker of the House; December 7, 1863 – March 3, 1869	Succeeded by New York's 24th congressional district
