= Todd Young =

American politician and attorney (born 1972)

- Official portrait, 2021

United States Senator from Indiana
- Incumbent
- Assumed office January 3, 2017 Serving with Jim Banks
- Preceded by: Dan Coats

Chair of the National Republican Senatorial Committee
- In office January 3, 2019 – January 3, 2021
- Leader: Mitch McConnell
- Preceded by: Cory Gardner
- Succeeded by: Rick Scott

Member of the U.S. House of Representatives from Indiana's 9th district
- In office January 3, 2011 – January 3, 2017
- Preceded by: Baron Hill
- Succeeded by: Trey Hollingsworth

Personal details
- Born: Todd Christopher Young; August 24, 1972 (age 54) Lancaster, Pennsylvania, U.S.
- Party: Republican
- Spouse: Jennifer Tucker (m. 2005)
- Children: 4
- Relatives: Dan Quayle (uncle-in-law)
- Education: United States Naval Academy (BS); University of Chicago (MBA); University of London (MA); Indiana University, Indianapolis (JD)
- Website: Senate website Campaign website

Military service
- Branch/service: United States Marine Corps
- Years of service: 1995–2000
- Rank: Captain
- Unit: VMUT-2
- Young's voice Young on organ transplants. Recorded July 9, 2019

Todd Christopher Young (born August 24, 1972) is an American politician and attorney serving as the senior United States senator from Indiana, a seat he has held since 2017. From 2011 to 2017, he was the U.S. representative for Indiana's 9th congressional district. Young is a member of the Republican Party.

Young was first elected to the Senate in 2016. From 2019 to 2021, he served as the chair of the National Republican Senatorial Committee, overseeing the 2020 election cycle for Senate Republicans. He was reelected in 2022.

A moderate Republican, Young has supported bipartisan legislation on gun control, same-sex marriage, and manufacturing. He has been critical of President Donald Trump, particularly his foreign policy and efforts to overturn the 2020 United States presidential election, refusing to endorse him in the 2024 United States presidential election.

== Early life, education, and military career ==
Young was born on August 24, 1972, in Lancaster, Pennsylvania, the second of three children of Nancy R. (née Pierce) and Bruce H. Young. He lived in Marion County, Indiana, for several years before settling in Hamilton County, Indiana, where he attended public schools and won a state soccer championship. In 1990, Young graduated from Carmel High School in Carmel, Indiana.

After graduating from high school, Young attended the Naval Academy Preparatory School in Newport, Rhode Island. In May 1991, he received an appointment from the Secretary of the Navy to attend the United States Naval Academy in Annapolis, Maryland, where his classmates elected him a class officer and he earned a varsity letter as a member of Navy's NCAA Division I soccer team. He graduated cum laude in 1995, earning a Bachelor of Science degree in political science, and accepted a commission in the United States Marine Corps.

Upon graduating from Annapolis, Young trained for six months at the Basic School in Quantico, Virginia. In 1996, he completed the Naval Intelligence Officer Basic Course in Dam Neck, Virginia. Young then led the intelligence department of VMU-2, an unmanned aerial vehicle squadron based in Cherry Point, North Carolina. In 2000, while stationed in the Chicago area, Young earned a Master of Business Administration from the University of Chicago Graduate School of Business.

== Post-military career ==
Young was honorably discharged from active duty in 2000 as a U.S. Marine Captain. After leaving active duty, he spent a year in London, attending the University of London's Institute of United States Studies. After writing a thesis on the economic history of Midwestern agriculture, in 2001 Young received his MA in American politics.

In the summer of 2001, Young traveled to former communist countries in Eastern Europe, where he studied the transition from centrally planned economies to free markets through an executive education program with the Leipzig Graduate School of Management, the first private business school in eastern Germany. He worked as an adjunct professor of public affairs at Indiana University's School of Public and Environmental Affairs and attended law school at night. In 2004, he joined Indiana-based Crowe Chizek and Company as a management consultant, helping state and local government clients improve service delivery to Indiana citizens.

In 2006, Young earned his J.D. from the Indiana University Robert H. McKinney School of Law, where he was president of the school's Federalist Society chapter. Upon graduation he joined the Paoli, Indiana-based firm Tucker and Tucker, P.C. Young is a member of the 2007 class of the Indiana Leadership Forum.

In 2001, Young moved to Washington, D.C., where he briefly worked at The Heritage Foundation, a conservative think tank. Then he became a staffer for U.S. senator Richard Lugar. In 2003, Young volunteered for Mitch Daniels's campaign for governor of Indiana. He was a delegate to the Indiana Republican state convention. From 2007 to 2010, Young served as Assistant Deputy Prosecutor for Orange County, Indiana. In 2007, Young founded a fiscal responsibility advocacy group, the National Organization for People vs. Irresponsible Government Spending.

== U.S. House of Representatives ==
=== Elections ===
==== 2010 ====
On January 26, 2009, Young announced that he would run for the United States congressional seat in Indiana's 9th district as a Republican.

Young competed with fellow Republicans Mike Sodrel and Travis Hankins for the party's nomination for Congress and won, challenging incumbent Democrat Baron Hill in the general election. Young was endorsed by former Vice President Dan Quayle, Lieutenant Governor Becky Skillman, Attorney General Greg Zoeller, Secretary of State Todd Rokita, Auditor Tim Berry, and Treasurer Richard Mourdock.

Young won the primary and general elections, defeating Hill, and was seated in the 112th Congress in January 2011.

==== 2012 ====
Young defeated Shelli Yoder, winning 55% of the vote in the newly redrawn 9th district.

==== 2014 ====
Young defeated Bill Bailey, winning 62% of the vote.

=== Tenure ===
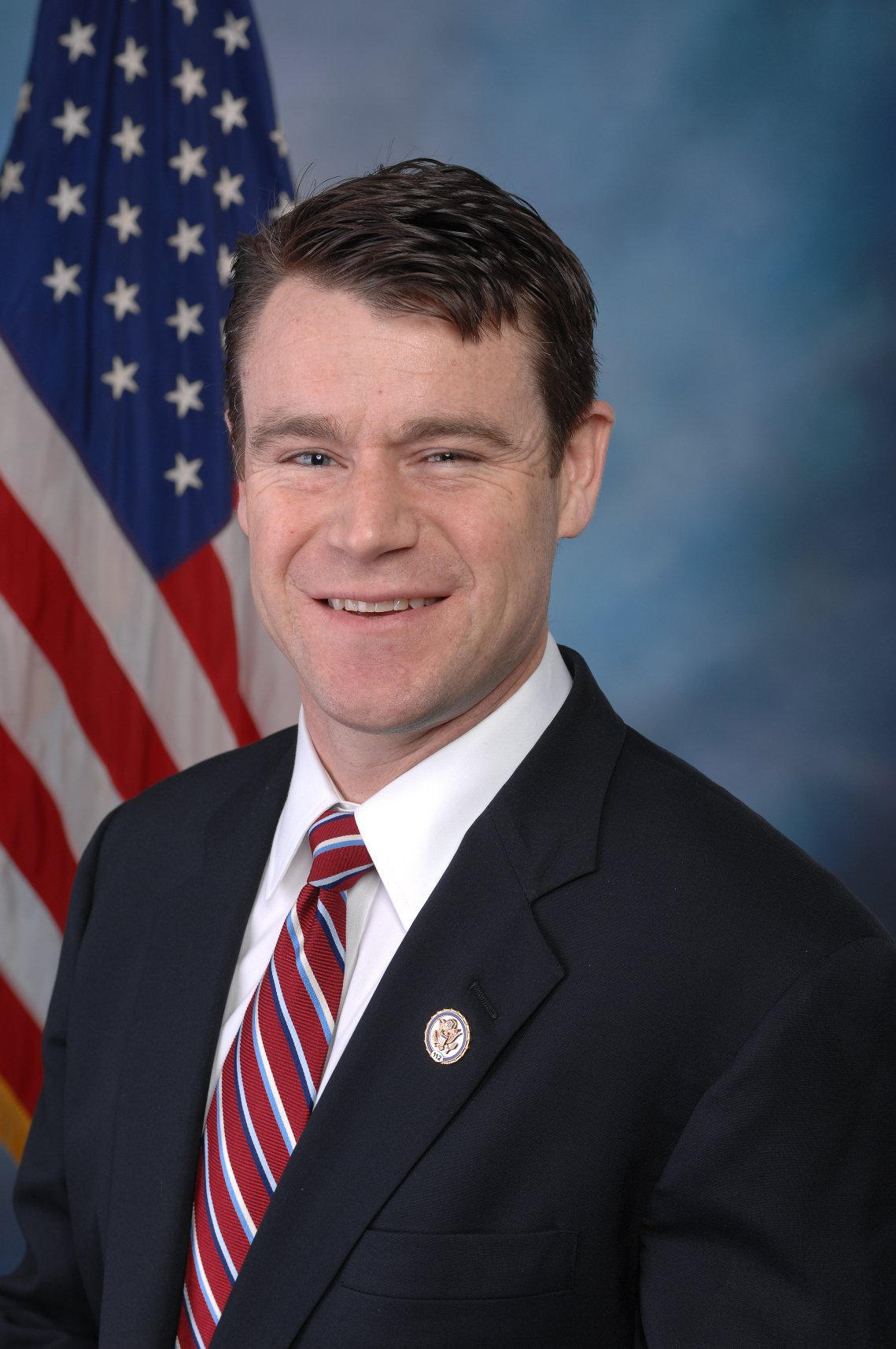
Young's 112th Congress portrait

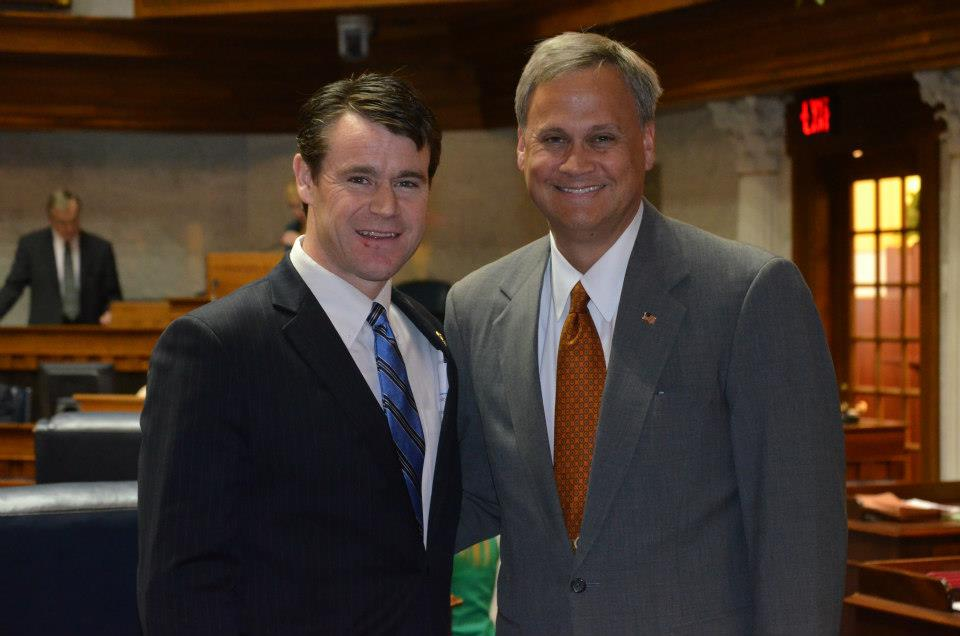
Young with state senator Jim Merritt in January 2013

In the 112th Congress, Young voted with the Republican Party 95% of the time. During the 113th Congress, the Human Rights Campaign, which rates politicians' support for LGBT issues, rated Young 30%, indicating a mixed record. In July 2012, Young took over as the lead sponsor of the REINS Act, a bill that passed the House in 2011 and would require congressional approval for rules with greater than $100 million in economic impact.

In the 112th Congress, Young was a member of the House Budget Committee and the House Armed Services Committee. On the latter, he focused on seapower, electronic warfare, and military grand strategy of the United States. During the first session of the 112th Congress, he employed one of the German Marshall Fund's Congressional Fellows as military legislative aide.

In 2010, Young said he was uncertain what was causing the observed heating of the planet, that it could be sunspots or normal cycles of nature, and that "the science is not settled". That same year he signed a pledge sponsored by Americans for Prosperity promising to vote against any global warming legislation that would raise taxes.

In 2011, he voted for the Energy Tax Prevention Act of 2011. In 2014, he said that it is "not necessarily the case" that there is a scientific consensus on climate change.

According to Five Thirty Eight, Young voted with President Trump's position on legislation during his first term about 82% of the time.

=== Sponsored legislation ===
- Fairness for American Families Act (H.R. 2668) – Introduced by Young on July 11, 2013, this bill would "amend the Internal Revenue Code, as amended by the Patient Protection and Affordable Care Act, to delay until 2015 the requirement that individuals maintain minimal essential health care coverage." The bill was proposed in response to a July 2, 2013, decision by the Obama administration to delay the employer mandate found in the Patient Protection and Affordable Care Act, but do nothing to the individual mandate requirement.

When he introduced the Fairness for American Families Act, Young argued that "rather than driving healthcare costs down, the individual mandate is imposing a new tax and burdensome costs on middle class families" and therefore "hardworking Americans deserve the same exemptions that President Obama is unilaterally granting to businesses and labor unions."

- Save American Workers Act of 2013 – a bill to amend the way in which the Patient Protection and Affordable Care Act (popularly known as Obamacare) defines full-time worker by raising the 30-hour threshold to 40 hours a week, in an effort to remove the incentive some companies may have to reduce their employees' hours to avoid the employer healthcare mandate. Young introduced it into the House on June 28, 2013.
- In 2023, Young and Tim Kaine co-sponsored legislation to end 1991 and 2002 congressional resolutions that authorized the use of military force (S.316). The bill repealed the Authorization for Use of Military Force (AUMF) in Iraq and passed with a bipartisan majority.

==== 119th Congress ====
- National Biotechnology Initiative Act - a bill to improve coordination across the federal government on biotechnology policy.

=== Committee assignments ===
- Committee on Commerce, Science, and Transportation
  - Subcommittee on Science, Manufacturing, and Competitiveness
  - Subcommittee on Communications, Media, and Broadband
  - Subcommittee on Consumer Protection, Product Safety, and Data Security
  - Subcommittee on Surface Transportation, Maritime, Freight, and Ports (Chairman)
- Select Committee on Intelligence
- Committee on Finance
  - Subcommittee on International Trade, Customs, and Global Competitiveness
  - Subcommittee on Health Care (Chairman)
  - Subcommittee on Social Security, Pensions, and Family Policy
- Committee on Small Business and Entrepreneurship

Caucus memberships

- Congressional Cement Caucus
- Congressional German-American Caucus
- Congressional Soccer Caucus

==== Appointments ====
- National Security Commission on Emerging Biotechnology

== U.S. Senate ==
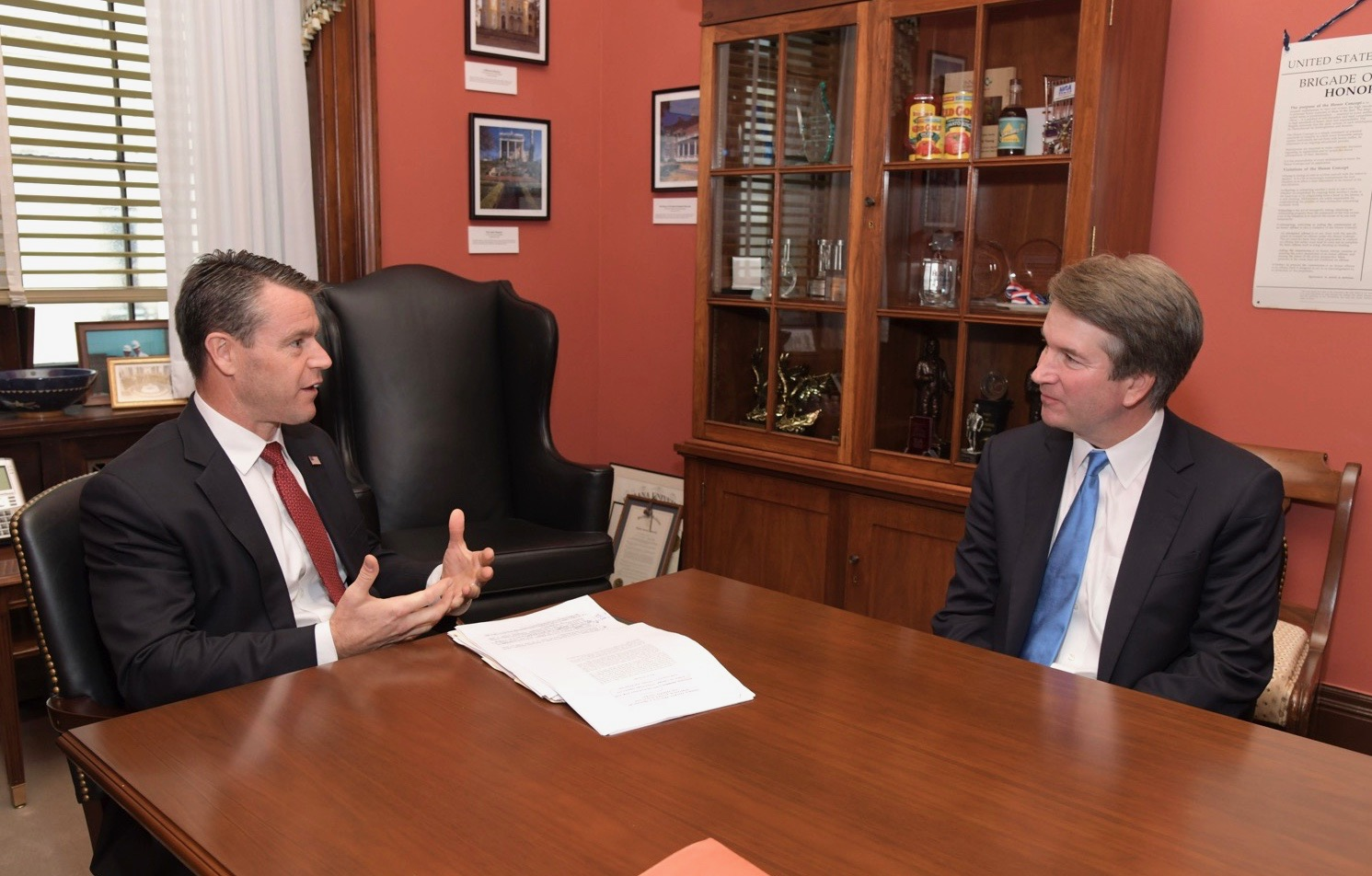
Young with Brett Kavanaugh in 2018

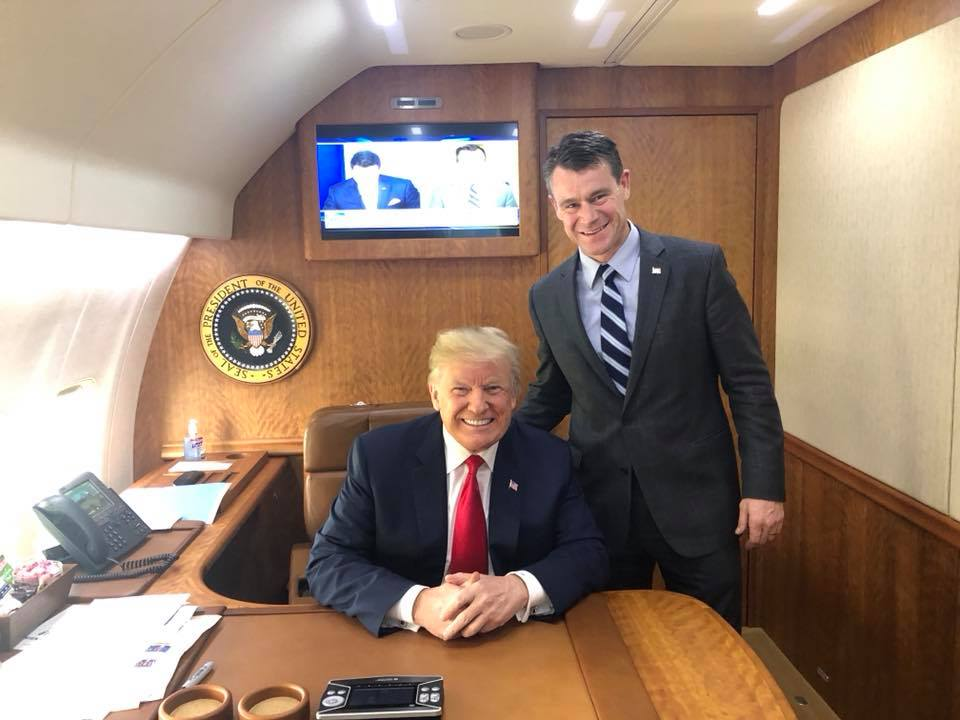
Young with President Donald Trump in 2018

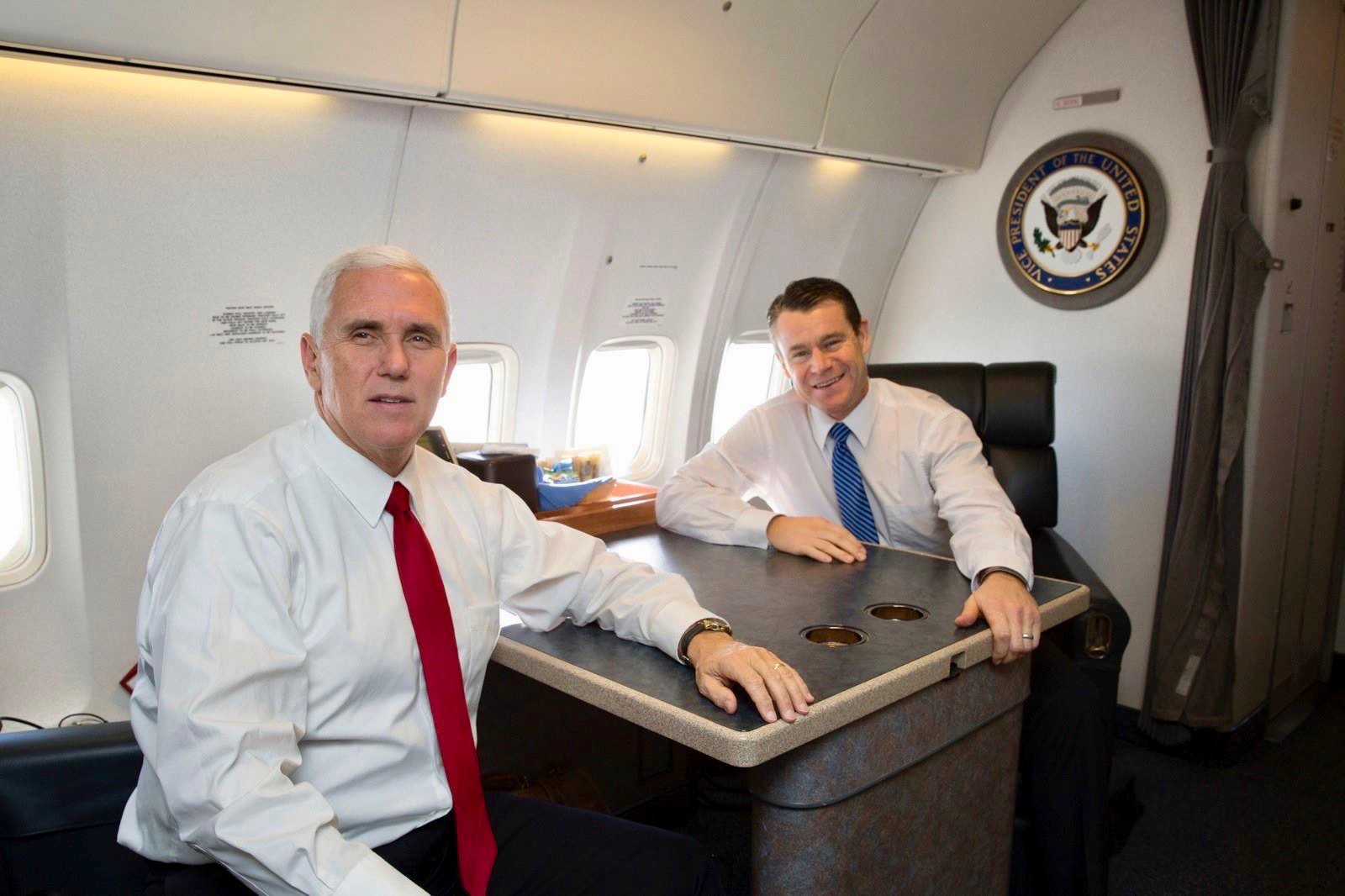
Young with Vice President Mike Pence in 2017

=== Elections ===
==== 2016 ====
Rather than run for reelection to the House, Young ran in the 2016 election to fill the Senate seat of the retiring Dan Coats. Although Young was certified as having submitted enough signatures to qualify for the primary ballot, that official certification was challenged, and a tally by the Associated Press concluded that Young had fallen short. The state Election Commission scheduled a hearing on the challenge for February 19, 2016. The commission voted down the challenge with a 2–2 vote and Young remained on the ballot. Young won the Republican primary with 67% of the vote, defeating U.S. Representative Marlin Stutzman.

Young was initially slated to face former U.S. Representative Baron Hill, whom Young had defeated in 2010, but on July 11, Hill announced he was dropping out of the Senate race. Hill was replaced by Evan Bayh, who had held the seat from 1999 to 2011. Young defeated Bayh, 52.1% to 42.4%.

==== 2022 ====
Young won the Republican nomination without opposition. He was reelected in the general election, defeating Democratic nominee Thomas McDermott Jr., 58.6% to 37.9%.

Although he had asked for an endorsement in April 2021, Young was one of only four Senate Republican incumbents to run without Trump's endorsement in 2022, alongside John Thune, James Lankford, and Lisa Murkowski.

=== Tenure ===
On January 3, 2017, Young was sworn into the U.S. Senate in the 115th Congress by Vice President Joe Biden. Young was ranked the ninth-most bipartisan senator in the first session of the 115th Congress by the Bipartisan Index, a metric created by the Lugar Center and Georgetown's McCourt School of Public Policy to assess congressional bipartisanship. GovTrack noted that during the same period, Young joined more bipartisan bills than any other freshman senator.

Young voted to certify the Electoral College count on January 6, 2021. He also said he supported efforts to create a bipartisan "Election Integrity Committee" to review the 2020 presidential election. While entering the US Capitol to participate in the certification on January 6, 2021, Young was accosted by pro-Trump protesters. He was asked why he would vote to support the count, claiming voter fraud. Young said, "When it comes to the law, our opinions don't matter; the law matters."

Young publicly acknowledged Biden as president-elect immediately following the official Electoral College tally on December 15, 2020. Upon the storming of the Capitol, Young tweeted, "This is not a peaceful protest—it is violence and reprehensible. It must stop." In the wake of the attack, Young would not say whether he supported using the Twenty-fifth Amendment to the United States Constitution to remove Trump, saying he trusted the Vice President and Trump cabinet members to "conscientiously and legally carry out their duties until January 20."

In 2022, Young cosponsored, with Democratic Senate Majority Leader Chuck Schumer, the CHIPS and Science Act, a $280 billion bill intended to promote basic and advanced technology research and development, with a focus on the American semiconductor industry, aiming to outcompete China in technological fields in the coming years. Young had also been involved in stalled efforts along similar lines on a bill known as United States Innovation and Competition Act in 2021. The CHIPS and Science Act passed the Senate on July 27, 2022, and was signed into law by Biden on August 9, 2022.

During the 118th Congress, Young occupied the Senate Candy Desk. In January 2025, Senator Markwayne Mullin replaced Young at the Candy Desk.

=== Committee assignments ===
- Committee on Commerce, Science, and Transportation
  - Subcommittee on Science, Manufacturing, and Competitiveness
  - Subcommittee on Communications, Media, and Broadband
  - Subcommittee on Consumer Protection, Product Safety, and Data Security
  - Subcommittee on Surface Transportation, Maritime, Freight, and Ports (Chairman)
- Select Committee on Intelligence
- Committee on Finance
  - Subcommittee on International Trade, Customs, and Global Competitiveness
  - Subcommittee on Health Care (Chairman)
  - Subcommittee on Social Security, Pensions, and Family Policy
- Committee on Small Business and Entrepreneurship

=== Caucus memberships ===
- Congressional Cement Caucus
- Congressional Soccer Caucus
- Congressional German-American Caucus
- Republican Main Street Partnership

==== Appointments ====
- National Security Commission on Emerging Biotechnology

== Political positions ==
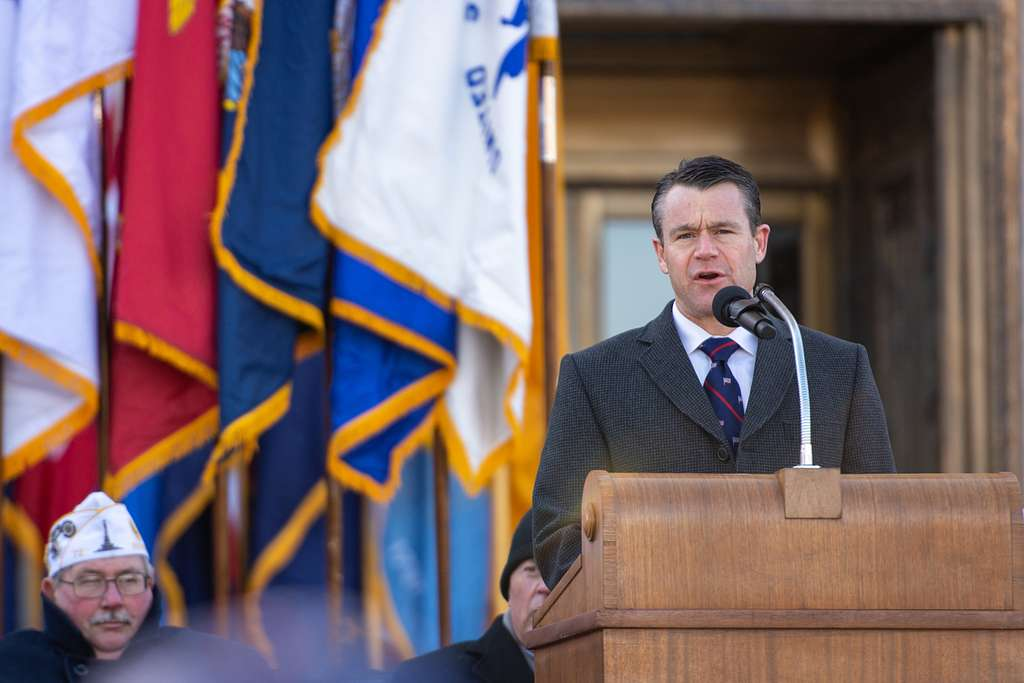
Young, a U.S. Marine Corps veteran, speaks at a Veterans Day event in 2018

Young is a moderate Republican. He is a member of the Republican Main Street Partnership, which supports moderate Republicans and advocates centrist Republican solutions in politics.

=== Abortion and reproductive issues ===
Young opposes abortion. He was endorsed by the National Right to Life Committee (NRLC), which gave him a 100% rating in 2018; he has a 0% rating from the abortion rights groups NARAL Pro-Choice America and Planned Parenthood. Young also believes that employers with religious objections should not be required to provide birth control to their female employees. He was a co-sponsor of legislation to defund Planned Parenthood and voted to prohibit federal funding for Planned Parenthood. Young believes Roe v. Wade was wrongly decided. On the day the overturning of Roe v. Wade was announced, he called it "a monumental day for the protection of life in America" and said the Supreme Court had "corrected a historic injustice."

=== Gun control ===
In 2016, the NRA Political Victory Fund (NRA-PVF) endorsed Young for Senate and gave him an "A+" grade.

In 2018, Gun Owners of America, a gun rights organization, gave Young a 50% score while the NRA gave him a 100% rating.

In 2022, Young was one of 15 Republican Senators who voted to pass the Bipartisan Safer Communities Act, a gun control law that expanded federal background checks for firearm purchasers under 21, broadened firearm restrictions for individuals convicted of domestic violence offenses involving dating partners, and allocated $750 million to state crisis intervention programs, including red flag laws that allow courts to temporarily restrict firearm possession by individuals deemed dangerous.

=== Immigration ===
In 2016, Young opposed the DREAM Act. UnidosUS, formerly "La Raza", which supports progressive immigration reform, gave Young a 59% rating in 2014. Young has said he wants an immigration system based on merit and job skills.

In 2018, Young introduced a bill cosponsored by Ted Cruz to end family separations at the border that resulted from President Trump's "zero tolerance" policy.

In June 2020, following the Supreme Court's ruling in Department of Homeland Security v. Regents of the University of California, which blocked the Trump administration's attempt to terminate Deferred Action for Childhood Arrivals (DACA), Young expressed support for granting legal status to illegal immigrants brought to the United States as children, including the possibility of a pathway to citizenship, arguing that maintaining a permanent legal status without citizenship would be difficult.

In 2024, Young argued that America was missing out on economic opportunity because of its immigration system, saying, "We've got to secure the southern border, but we can't use that as an excuse not to reform our highly-dysfunctional legal immigration system"

=== LGBT rights ===
In 2014, Young argued that same-sex marriage legalization should be left to the states to decide. He supports allowing gays and lesbians to serve openly in the military.

In 2016, Young was one of 30 Republicans who voted with Democrats in favor of a spending amendment to uphold President Obama's executive order prohibiting discrimination based on sexual orientation for federal contractors.

In 2022, Young was one of 12 Senate Republicans to vote for the Respect for Marriage Act, legislation that codified same-sex marriage into federal law. His vote drew criticism from some Indiana Republicans, prompting the Cass County Republican Central Committee to censure Young, accusing him of abandoning socially conservative principles and reversing his previously held position that marriage laws should be determined by individual states. The committee urged Republican organizations in Indiana's other 91 counties to issue similar censures. Allen County Republican chairman Steve Shine declined to censure Young, citing divided reactions among local Republicans.

=== U.S. Supreme Court ===
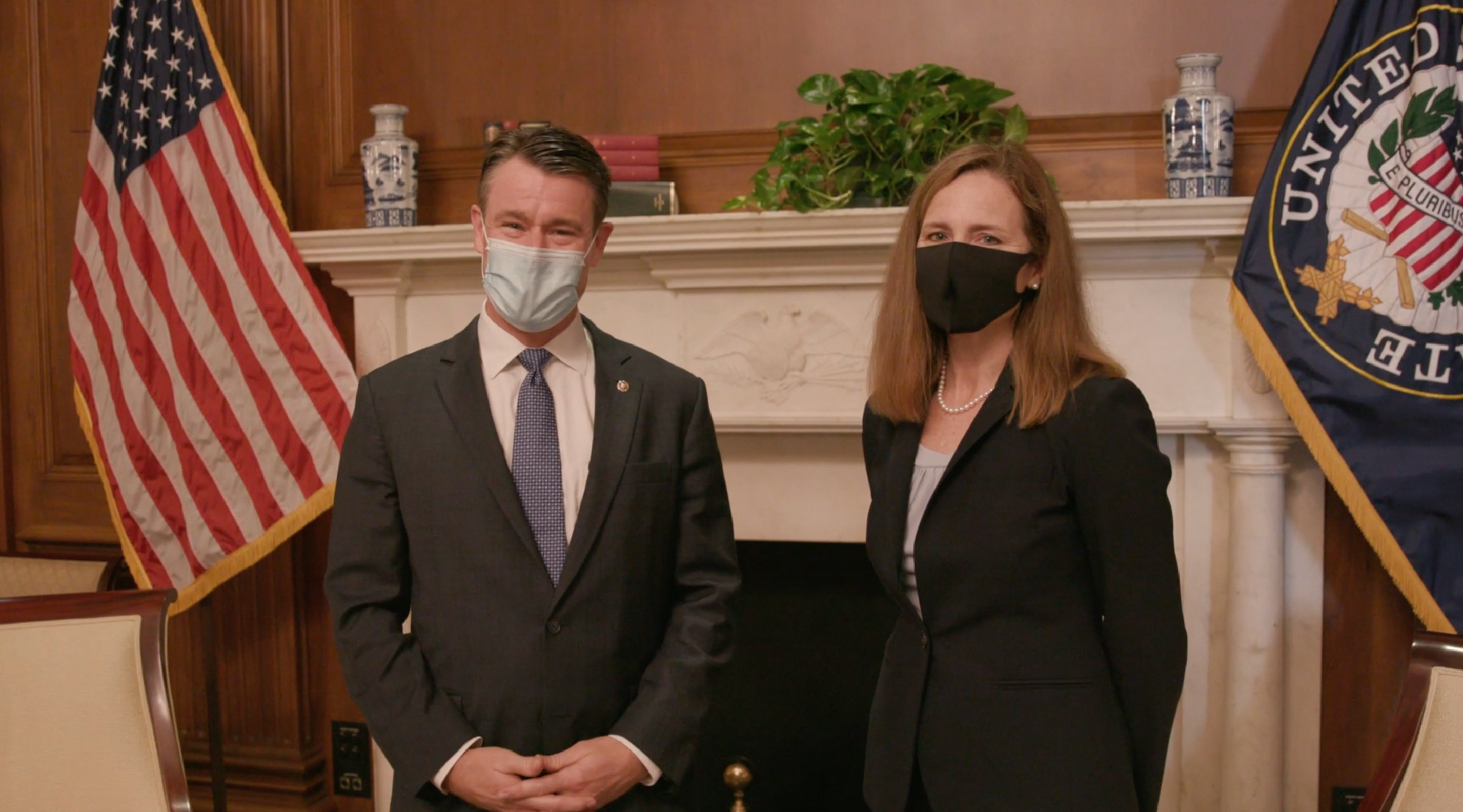
Young meets with U.S. Supreme Court nominee Amy Coney Barrett in September 2020

On October 6, 2018, Young voted to confirm Brett Kavanaugh to the U.S. Supreme Court.

In March 2019, Young was one of 12 senators to cosponsor a resolution that would add a constitutional amendment limiting the U.S. Supreme Court to nine justices. The resolution was introduced after multiple Democratic presidential candidates expressed openness to the idea of adding seats to the U.S. Supreme Court.

=== Foreign policy ===
In July 2017, Young voted for the Countering America's Adversaries Through Sanctions Act, which placed sanctions on Russia, Iran, and North Korea.

In 2017, Young supported the Israel Anti-Boycott Act, which would make it illegal for U.S. companies to engage in boycotts against Israel and Israeli settlements in the West Bank.

Young condemned the genocide of the Rohingya Muslim minority in Myanmar and called for a stronger response to the crisis.

In February 2019, Young was one of seven senators to reintroduce legislation requiring sanctions on Saudi officials involved in the killing of Jamal Khashoggi and seeking to address support for the Yemen civil war by prohibiting some weapons sales to Saudi Arabia and U.S. military refueling of Saudi coalition planes. In May 2019, he was one of seven Republicans who attempted to override President Trump's veto of the resolution regarding Yemen.

In June 2019, Young was one of seven Republicans to vote to block Trump's Saudi arms deal providing weapons to Saudi Arabia, United Arab Emirates, and Jordan, and one of six Republicans to vote against an additional 20 arms sales. In 2020, he was one of eight Republicans who voted with Democrats for a resolution limiting the president's ability to strike Iran.

In 2021, Young and Senator Tim Kaine introduced legislation that would repeal the 1991 and 2002 authorizations of war, the executive has used to wage prolonged conflict in the Middle East without congressional approval. After the second Donald Trump administration launched the 2026 Iran war, Young voted against a measure to require the administration to get congressional approval before continuing the operation.

In January 2026, following the U.S. military operation in Venezuela that resulted in the capture of President Nicolás Maduro, Young was one of five Republican senators who joined Democrats in voting to advance a War Powers Resolution requiring congressional authorization for further military operations against Venezuela. Trump condemned the five Republicans, saying they "should never be elected to office again". On January 14, Young reversed his position after receiving assurances from Secretary of State Marco Rubio that no U.S. troops remained in Venezuela and that the administration would seek congressional authorization for major future military operations. The resolution was later blocked in a 50–50 procedural vote, with Vice President JD Vance casting the tie-breaking vote.

=== Donald Trump ===
In 2022, Young was one of only four Senate Republican incumbents to run for reelection without Trump's endorsement, alongside John Thune, James Lankford, and Lisa Murkowski. Within Indiana's congressional delegation, Young was one of just two Republicans, alongside Greg Pence, to not receive Trump's endorsement. He had asked for Trump's endorsement in April 2021.

In 2023, Young said he would not support Trump's 2024 presidential campaign. When asked why, he replied, "Where do I begin?" He argued that Trump was not electable in a general election, telling HuffPost: "He consistently loses. In fact, he has a habit of losing not just his own elections, but losing elections for others... I can't think of someone worse equipped to bring people together to pass legislation and advance our collective values than the former president."

In March 2024, after the Super Tuesday primaries, in which Trump won 14 of the 15 Republican contests, Young reaffirmed that he would not endorse Trump in the 2024 United States presidential election. Later that month, Young said he would vote for neither Trump nor Democratic incumbent Joe Biden.

=== National security ===
In January 2025, during the confirmation hearing for President Trump's nominee for Director of National Intelligence, Tulsi Gabbard, Young questioned her refusal to characterize Edward Snowden as a traitor and challenged her previous support for dropping criminal charges against him. His scrutiny prompted criticism from Trump allies, including Elon Musk, who briefly called Young a "deep state puppet" before retracting the accusation. Young eventually voted to confirm Gabbard after receiving assurances concerning national security issues.

=== 2021 storming of the United States Capitol ===
On May 28, 2021, Young voted against creating an independent commission to investigate the 2021 United States Capitol attack.

== Personal life ==
In 2005 Todd Young married Jennifer Tucker, niece of former vice president Dan Quayle (whose Senate seat Young coincidentally now holds). The couple has four children.

He is a Protestant.

== Electoral history ==
=== U.S. House of Representatives ===
Indiana's 9th Congressional District Election, 2010
Primary election
Party	Candidate	Votes	%
Republican	Todd Young	19,141	34.57
Republican	Travis Hankins	17,909	32.34
Republican	Mike Sodrel	16,868	30.46
Republican	Rick Warre	1,453	2.62
Total votes		55,371	100.00
General election
Republican	Todd Young	118,040	52.34
Democratic	Baron Hill (incumbent)	95,353	42.28
Libertarian	Greg "No Bull" Knott	12,070	5.35
Independent	Jerry R. Lucas (write-in)	69	0.03
Total votes		225,532	100.00
Republican gain from Democratic			

Indiana's 9th Congressional District Election, 2012
Primary election
Party	Candidate	Votes	%
Republican	Todd Young (incumbent)	59,327	100.00
Total votes		59,327	100.00
General election
Republican	Todd Young (incumbent)	165,332	55.45
Democratic	Shelli Yoder	132,848	44.55
Total votes		298,180	100.00
Republican hold			

Indiana's 9th Congressional District Election, 2014
Primary election
Party	Candidate	Votes	%
Republican	Todd Young (incumbent)	30,402	79.37
Republican	Kathy Lowe Heil	4,607	12.03
Republican	Mark G. Jones	3,293	8.60
Total votes		38,302	100.00
General election
Republican	Todd Young (incumbent)	101,594	62.56
Democratic	Bill Bailey	55,016	33.88
Libertarian	Ralph Mike Frey	5,777	3.56
Total votes		162,387	100.00
Republican hold			

=== U.S. Senate ===
2016 U.S. Senate Indiana Republican primary results
Party	Candidate	Votes	%
Republican	Todd Young	661,136	67.08%
Republican	Marlin Stutzman	324,429	32.92%
Total votes		985,565	100.00%

United States Senate election in Indiana, 2016
Party	Candidate	Votes	%	±%
Republican	Todd Young	1,423,991	52.11%	−2.49%
Democratic	Evan Bayh	1,158,947	42.41%	+2.40%
Libertarian	Lucy Brenton	149,481	5.47%	+0.08%
Independent	James L. Johnson, Jr. (write-in)	127	0.01%	N/A
Total votes		2,732,546	100.00%	N/A
Republican hold				

United States Senate election in Indiana, 2022
Party	Candidate	Votes	%	±%
Republican	Todd Young (incumbent)	1,090,390	58.62%	+6.51%
Democratic	Thomas McDermott Jr.	704,480	37.87%	−4.54%
Libertarian	James Sceniak	63,823	3.43%	−2.04%
Write-in		1,461	0.08%	+0.07%
Total votes		1,860,154	100.00%	N/A
Republican hold				

U.S. House of Representatives
Preceded by Baron Hill	Member of the U.S. House of Representatives from Indiana's 9th congressional district 2011–2017	Succeeded by Trey Hollingsworth
Party political offices
Preceded by Dan Coats	Republican nominee for U.S. Senator from Indiana (Class 3); 2016, 2022	Most recent
Preceded by Cory Gardner	Chair of the National Republican Senatorial Committee; 2019–2021	Succeeded by Rick Scott
U.S. Senate
Preceded by Dan Coats	U.S. Senator (Class 3) from Indiana; 2017–present Served alongside: Joe Donnelly, Mike Braun, Jim Banks	Incumbent
U.S. order of precedence (ceremonial)
Preceded by John Kennedy	Order of precedence of the United States as United States Senator	Succeeded by Tammy Duckworth
Preceded by Chris Van Hollen	United States senators by seniority 57th	Succeeded by Tammy Duckworth
