= Americans for Honesty on Issues =

Americans for Honesty on Issues is a Houston, Texas based 527 group that by mid-October 2006 had spent over one million dollars on television advertisements, critical of Democratic Party candidates, in advance of the 2006 United States general election. 527 groups are tax-exempt organizations that participate in political activities, typically via soft money contributions, which have no legal limit. By United States federal law, they are not allowed to coordinate their efforts with political campaigns.

== Backers ==
- Sue Walden, a Houston business owner, is the president of Americans for Honesty on Issues. Walden was a lobbyist for Enron and is considered a close ally of the former House Majority Leader Tom DeLay, who was forced to resign from Congress amid ethics scandals. Walden has been a Minor League Pioneer fundraiser for George W. Bush, raising $43,000. and was an adviser to Kenneth L. Lay, the former chief executive of Enron.
- Bob J. Perry, a Houston construction firm owner, appears to be the sole funder of AHI. Perry was the major funder of Swift Boat Veterans for Truth, who ran a campaign against John Kerry in the 2004 election. He also is the majority funder of the Economic Freedom Fund and has donated $5,000,000 to the Free Enterprise Fund.

== See also ==
- Bob J. Perry
- Economic Freedom Fund
- Free Enterprise Fund
