= Bob J. Perry =

American real estate developer and political donor

Bobby Jack Perry, known as Bob J. Perry (October 30, 1932 – April 13, 2013), was a Houston, Texas homebuilder, owner of Perry Homes, and major contributor to a number of politically oriented 527 groups, such as the Swift Vets and POWs for Truth and the Economic Freedom Fund.

== Career ==
In 1968, at 36, he started his homebuilding business, Perry Homes, in Houston. Perry Homes, is a construction company that has built developments comparable to those of the company Toll Brothers. In 2003, the privately held company ranked as the nation's 42nd largest home builder with $420 million in revenue.

== Political donations ==
=== 527 groups ===
In the 2004 election cycle, Perry gave $4.45 million to Swift Vets and POWs for Truth (formerly Swift Boat Veterans for Truth), a 527 group founded by 200 Vietnam veterans; he was the largest single donor. The group held press conferences, ran ads and endorsed a book questioning Kerry's service record and his military awards. The group included several members of Kerry's unit, such as Larry Thurlow, who commanded a swift boat alongside of Kerry's, and Stephen Gardner, who served on Kerry's boat. Chris McGreal of the left-leaning newspaper The Guardian wrote that Perry was the "leading financier" of the group, and alleged the group "smeared the 2004 Democratic presidential candidate Kerry with accusations he made false claims about his service in Vietnam."

In that cycle, Perry also donated $3 million to Progress for America Voter Fund. In all, he donated almost $8.1 million to 527 groups in 2003-2004.

In mid-2006, Perry donated $5 million to found a new 527 group, the Economic Freedom Fund. The $5 million makes the group one of the top ten in the 2006 election cycle. He also appears to be the sole donor to Americans for Honesty on Issues. These groups have primarily paid for negative advertisements targeting Democratic Party candidates in the 2006 United States general election.

In 2010, Perry donated $7 million to the 527 group American Crossroads, making it the largest single donation that the organization has received to date. American Crossroads primarily works to elect Republican and conservative legislators. The super PAC Restore Our Future (supporting Mitt Romney) received $3 million from Perry in February 2011. Perry also donated to the Super PAC Congressional Leadership Fund, making his total contributions to Super PACs nearly $8 million.

In 2011, Perry donated $2,531,799 to Texas Governor and United States Presidential Candidate Rick Perry (R, TX) toward his Presidential campaign.

Between 2011 and 2012 Perry donated another $10 million to the Mitt Romney affiliated Restore our Future and another $6.5 million to American Crossroads. Perry is the biggest contributor to SuperPACs in the 2012 election cycle with a total of $18.5 million as of September 2012. He was a 2012 donor to Christi Craddick, a Republican elected to the Texas Railroad Commission, and a daughter of former Speaker of the Texas House of Representatives Tom Craddick of Midland, Texas.

=== Other ===
Perry contributed $46,000 to George W. Bush’s 1994 and 1998 campaigns for Texas Governor. He was the largest individual contributor to the Texas Republican Party during the 2002 election cycle (calendar 2001 and 2002) giving $905,000.

Perry gave $165,000 in the 2002 election cycle to Tom DeLay's Texans for a Republican Majority political action committee (TRMPAC) giving $165,000 in the 2002 election cycle. In October 2002 Perry and his wife contributed $95,000 to DeLay's Americans for a Republican Majority political action committee (ARMPAC). They also contributed $10,000 to DeLay's legal defense fund.

In 2006, Perry was the largest political donor in Texas. His donations included nearly $400,000 to the campaign of GOP Governor Rick Perry (no relation).

In March 2007, Perry was listed as a member of Mitt Romney's "Texas Leadership Team", indicating his commitment to contribute to and raise money for Romney's presidential campaign. In December 2007, he donated $200,000 to the Club for Growth for advertisements against Mike Huckabee in the Republican primary. In 2008, he donated another $400,000 to the Club for Growth, which used most of it for its campaign against Mark Udall, the Democratic nominee in the 2008 Colorado election for U.S. Senate.

During the 2012 Wisconsin Gubernatorial Recall Election, Perry donated $500,000 to the "Friends of Scott Walker" campaign - second only to Diane Hendricks with $510,000. Also in 2012, he donated $1 million to the Freedom Fund North America PAC, which spent nearly that amount on television ads against Democratic Senatorial candidates Jon Tester in Montana and Heidi Heitkamp in North Dakota, both of whom won their races.

== Personal life ==
Perry was born in a one-room house in rural Bosque County, northwest of Waco. He attended Baylor University in Waco, where his father, W.C. Perry, completed a public school teaching career as vice president of student affairs. Perry graduated from Baylor in 1954 with a major in history and followed in his father's footsteps by teaching high school. He married his wife Doylene in 1961 and they had children. She was a professor at San Jacinto College.

Perry was a resident of Nassau Bay, Texas in Greater Houston and lived there for over thirty years. He was a member of the Nassau Bay Baptist Church.

He died in his sleep the night of April 13, 2013. Bob Perry's daughter, Kathy Britton is now the CEO of Perry Homes.

== Memberships ==
Perry was reportedly a member of the Council for National Policy, joining the CNP Board of Governors in 1982, and serving as vice president of the organization's Executive Committee from 1984–85, as well as being a member of that committee in 1988. He also reportedly was a member of the Board of Directors of the Houston, Texas Chamber of Commerce; on the executive board of the Boy Scouts of America; a former citizen member of the state banking board of Texas; and a member of the Heritage Club.
