= Liz Watson (politician) =

American labor attorney (born 1975)

Assistant Secretary of Labor for Congressional and Intergovernmental Affairs
- In office August 31, 2022 – January 20, 2025
- President: Joe Biden
- Preceded by: Michelle Rose (acting)

Personal details
- Born: December 9, 1975 (age 50) Bloomington, Indiana, U.S.
- Party: Democratic
- Spouse: Craig Briskin
- Children: 2
- Education: Carleton College (BA); Georgetown University (JD)

Elizabeth Schoff Watson (born December 9, 1975) is an American labor attorney, former executive director of the Congressional Progressive Caucus Center, and a former Assistant Secretary of Labor for Congressional and Intergovernmental Affairs at the United States Department of Labor. Watson was the Democratic nominee for the 2018 U.S. House of Representatives election in Indiana's 9th congressional district.

== Early life and education ==
Watson was born in Bloomington, Indiana. She attended Bloomington High School South before earning degrees from Carleton College and Georgetown University Law Center. One of Watson's first jobs was as an intern in the district office of Congressman Frank McCloskey.

== Career ==
Watson began her legal career as a Skadden Public Interest Law Fellow in New York City's Welfare Law Center, representing participants in the city's workfare program and educating women about their rights under labor and employment laws.

Watson briefly worked as an employment attorney at Orrick, Herrington & Sutcliffe before joining the staff of the Workplace Flexibility 2010 project at Georgetown Law School, where she developed policies to help low-wage workers better balance work and family responsibilities. She was then promoted to executive director of the Georgetown Center on Poverty, Inequality and Public Policy, where she led a group proposing a broader set of public policy initiatives to address the needs of low-income workers.

At the National Women's Law Center, Watson was director of Workplace Justice for Women and Senior Counsel, and authored publications such as "It Shouldn’t Be A Heavy Lift: Fair Treatment for Pregnant Workers" and "50 Years & Counting: The Unfinished Business of Achieving Fair Pay".

From 2015 to 2017, she served as the labor policy director and chief labor counsel for House Democrats in the Committee on Education and the Workforce in the United States House of Representatives.

In 2017, Watson returned to Bloomington and began teaching constitutional law at the Indiana University Maurer School of Law while running for Congress.

The Congressional Progressive Caucus Center (CPCC) named her its executive director in 2019.

=== Biden administration ===
On April 27, 2021, President Joe Biden nominated Watson to serve as Assistant Secretary of Labor for Congressional and Intergovernmental Affairs at the United States Department of Labor. Watson's initial nomination expired at the end of the year, and was sent back to President Biden on January 3, 2022.

President Biden renominated Watson the following day. Her nomination was confirmed on May 18, 2022.

== 2018 House of Representatives campaign ==
In July 2017, Watson announced her candidacy to represent Indiana's 9th congressional district in the U.S. House of Representatives as a Democrat.

=== Primary election ===
Watson defeated civil rights attorney Dan Canon and truck driver Rob Chatlos in the May 8, 2018, Democratic primary election with 24,981 votes and 66.4% of the total votes cast. Watson's victory garnered national attention for the high level of financial and volunteer support she received from feminists.

=== General election ===
In September 2018, Watson was endorsed by Senators Bernie Sanders and Elizabeth Warren. As of September 30, 2018, the Liz for Indiana campaign reported $1,946,997 in total receipts and $1,452,365 in total disbursements. Watson lost to Republican incumbent Trey Hollingsworth in the November 6, 2018, general election. Hollingsworth defeated Watson with 56.5% of the vote to her 43.5%.

=== Documentary ===
Watson was one of three 2018 candidates featured in the 2020 documentary Surge, along with Representative Lauren Underwood and Jana Sanchez. The documentary has received critical attention from a variety of sources.

== Political positions ==
=== Health care ===
Watson supports Medicare for All. She also supports the Obamacare, calling it a "starting point" that needs work.

On her campaign website, Watson says she opposes defunding Planned Parenthood, calling it "high-quality, affordable health care for both women and men." She also opposes Congressional attempts to block Medicaid patients from accessing care at Planned Parenthood centers.

Regarding marijuana policy, Watson supports the legalization of medical marijuana as well as federal measures to prevent interference from the Department of Justice in the implementation of state medical cannabis laws.

=== Minimum wage and labor ===
As director of workplace justice at the National Women's Law Center, Watson helped pass paid family leave and gender equity pay laws in Maryland.

More recently, as the Labor Policy Director for the Democrats in the House of Representatives, Watson led the development of legislation which called for the minimum wage to be raised to a living wage at $15 an hour.

Watson supports labor unions and opposes raising the retirement age.

=== Education ===
Watson supports the expansion of access to early childhood and pre-kindergarten education and opposes voucher programs and further expansion of charter schools.

Regarding higher education, Watson supports the College for All Act, which would "eliminate tuition and fees at four-year public colleges and universities for families making up to $125,000 ... and make community college tuition- and fee-free for all."

=== Gun control ===
Watson supports reinstating the federal ban on assault weapons which expired in 2004. Additionally, Watson supports revoking the Center for Disease Control's ban on researching gun violence. Watson opposes the Concealed Carry Reciprocity Act which "would require states to recognize concealed carry permits issued by other states."

=== LGBTQ rights ===
Watson supports the Do No Harm Act, which would amend the Religious Freedom Restoration Act to clarify that it is "intended to protect religious freedom without allowing the infliction of harm on other people."

== Personal ==
Watson married lawyer Craig Briskin at the Indiana University Auditorium in 2003. They have two children and lived in Bloomington, Indiana.
