= 2018 United States House of Representatives elections in Indiana =

- November 6, 2018

Indiana's nine seats in the United States House of Representatives
	Majority party	Minority party
Party	Republican	Democratic
Last election	7	2
Seats won	7	2
Seat change	Steady	Steady
Popular vote	1,247,978	1,000,104
Percentage	55.31%	44.33%
Swing	▲1.03%	▲4.72%

Republican
50–60%
60–70%
70–80%
80–90%
Democratic
40–50%
50–60%
60–70%

The 2018 United States House of Representatives elections in Indiana were held on November 6, 2018, to elect the nine U.S. representatives from the state of Indiana, one from each of the state's nine congressional districts. The elections coincided with other elections to the House of Representatives, as well as elections to the United States Senate and various state and local elections. The filing deadline for candidates was February 9, 2018. The primaries were held on May 8, 2018.

== Overview ==
=== Statewide ===
Party	Candidates	Votes		Seats		
Party	Candidates	No.	%	No.	+/–	%
Republican	9	1,247,978	55.31	7	Steady	77.78
Democratic	9	1,000,104	44.33	2	Steady	22.22
Libertarian	1	8,030	0.36	0	Steady	0.0
Write-in	4	37	<0.01	0	Steady	0.0
Total	23	2,256,149	100.0	9	Steady	100.0

Popular vote
Republican	55.31%
Democratic	44.33%
Other	0.36%

House seats
Republican	77.78%
Democratic	22.22%

=== By district ===
Results of the 2018 United States House of Representatives elections in Indiana by district:

District	Republican		Democratic		Others		Total		Result
District	Votes	%	Votes	%	Votes	%	Votes	%	Result
District 1	85,594	34.91%	159,611	65.09%	4	0.00%	245,209	100.0%	Democratic hold
District 2	125,499	54.73%	103,363	45.24%	27	0.02%	228,889	100.0%	Republican hold
District 3	158,927	64.73%	86,610	35.27%	0	0.00%	245,537	100.0%	Republican hold
District 4	156,539	64.06%	87,824	35.94%	0	0.00%	244,363	100.0%	Republican hold
District 5	180,035	56.76%	137,142	43.24%	0	0.00%	317,177	100.0%	Republican hold
District 6	154,260	63.82%	79,430	32.86%	8,036	3.32%	241,726	100.0%	Republican hold
District 7	76,457	35.14%	141,139	64.86%	0	0.00%	217,596	100.0%	Democratic hold
District 8	157,396	64.43%	86,895	35.57%	0	0.00%	244,291	100.0%	Republican hold
District 9	153,271	56.48%	118,090	43.52%	0	0.00%	271,361	100.0%	Republican hold
Total	1,247,978	55.31%	1,000,104	44.33%	8,067	0.36%	2,256,149	100.0%	

== District 1 ==
2018 Indiana's 1st congressional district election
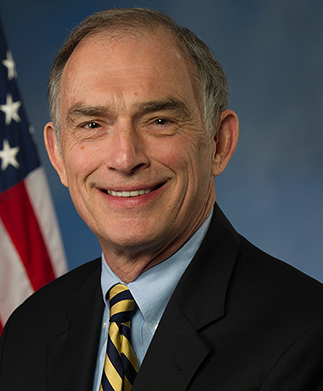

Nominee	Pete Visclosky	Mark Leyva
Party	Democratic	Republican
Popular vote	159,611	85,594
Percentage	65.1%	34.9%
- County results Visclosky: 50–60% 60–70%
U.S. Representative before election
Pete Visclosky
Democratic
Elected U.S. Representative
Pete Visclosky
Democratic

Indiana's 1st Congressional District is located in the suburbs and exurbs of Chicago, Illinois. It encompasses all of Lake and Porter counties and parts of LaPorte County. Incumbent Democrat Pete Visclosky, who had represented the district since 1985, ran for re-election. He was re-elected with 82% of the vote in 2016. The district had a PVI of D+8.

=== Democratic primary ===
==== Candidates ====
===== Nominee =====
- Pete Visclosky, incumbent U.S. representative

===== Eliminated in primary =====
- Larry Chubb
- Antonio Daggett Sr., former US Army lieutenant colonel

==== Primary results ====
Democratic primary results
Party	Candidate	Votes	%
Democratic	Pete Visclosky (incumbent)	42,261	80.5
Democratic	Antonio Daggett Sr.	5,813	11.1
Democratic	Larry Chubb	4,402	8.4
Total votes		52,476	100.0

=== Republican primary ===
==== Candidates ====
===== Nominee =====
- Mark Leyva, carpenter, steelworker, activist and nominee for this seat in 2010 & 2014

===== Eliminated in primary =====
- Jeremy Belko, truck driver
- David Dopp
- Roseann Ivanovich
- John Meyer
- Nicholas Pappas

==== Primary results ====
Republican primary results
Party	Candidate	Votes	%
Republican	Mark Leyva	5,960	27.0
Republican	John Meyer	4,328	19.6
Republican	Roseann Ivanovich	4,317	19.6
Republican	Nicholas Pappas	4,311	19.5
Republican	David Dopp	1,679	7.6
Republican	Jeremy Belko	1,485	6.7
Total votes		22,080	100

=== General election ===
==== Predictions ====
Source	Ranking	As of
The Cook Political Report	Safe D	November 5, 2018
Inside Elections	Safe D	November 5, 2018
Sabato's Crystal Ball	Safe D	November 5, 2018
RCP	Safe D	November 5, 2018
Daily Kos	Safe D	November 5, 2018
538	Safe D	November 7, 2018
CNN	Safe D	October 31, 2018
Politico	Safe D	November 2, 2018

==== Results ====
Indiana's 1st congressional district, 2018
Party	Candidate	Votes	%
Democratic	Pete Visclosky (incumbent)	159,611	65.1
Republican	Mark Leyva	85,594	34.9
Independent	Jonathan S. Kleinman (write-in)	4	0.0
Total votes		245,209	100.0
Democratic hold			

== District 2 ==
2018 Indiana's 2nd congressional district election
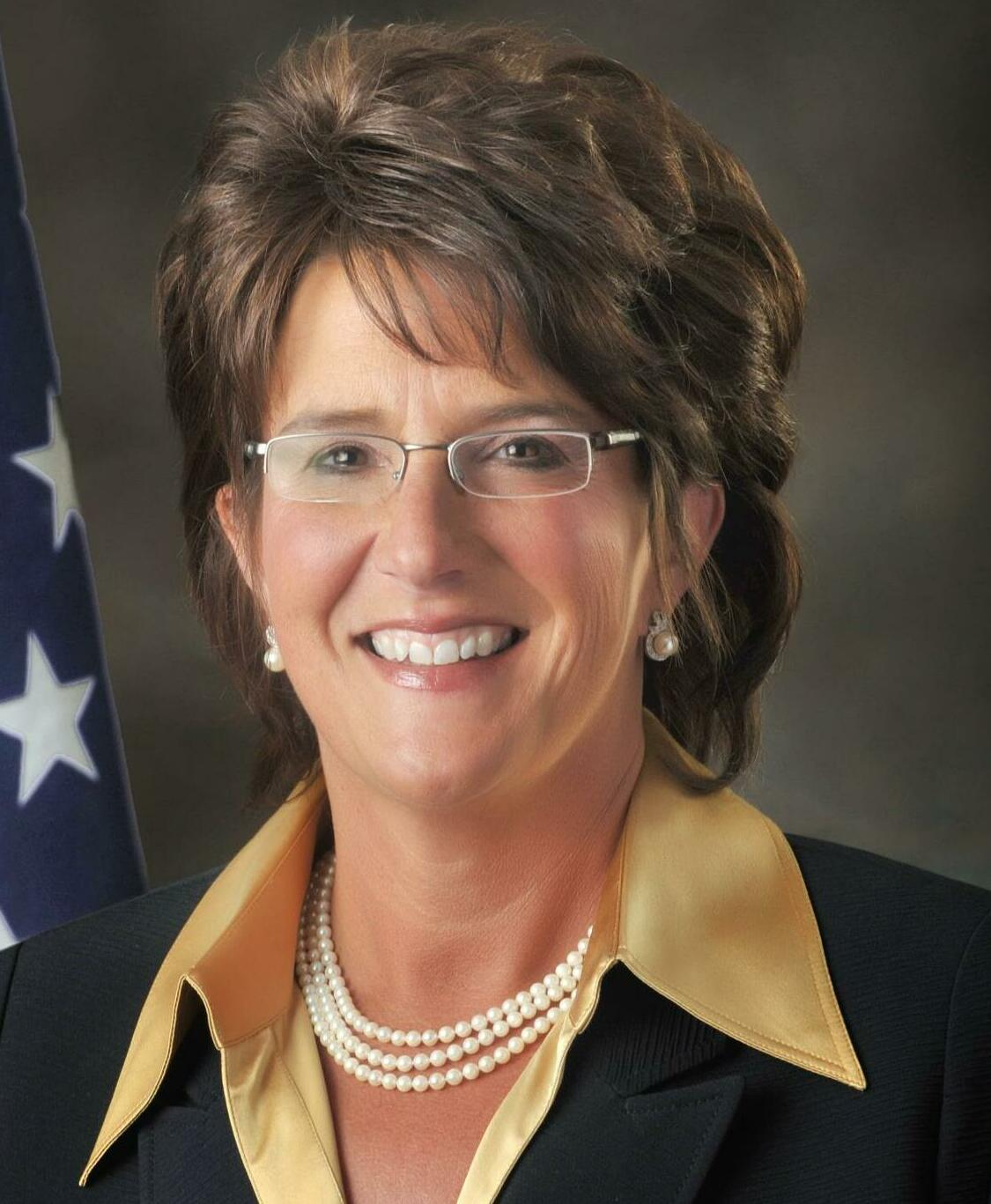

Nominee	Jackie Walorski	Mel Hall
Party	Republican	Democratic
Popular vote	125,499	103,363
Percentage	54.8%	45.2%
- County results Walorski: 50–60% 60–70% 70–80% Hackett: 50–60%
U.S. Representative before election
Jackie Walorski
Republican
Elected U.S. Representative
Jackie Walorski
Republican

Incumbent Republican Jackie Walorski, who had represented the district since 2013, ran for re-election. She was re-elected with 59% of the vote in 2016. The district had a PVI of R+11.

=== Republican primary ===
==== Candidates ====
===== Nominee =====
- Jackie Walorski, incumbent U.S. representative

===== Eliminated in primary =====
- Mark Summe

==== Primary results ====
Republican primary results
Party	Candidate	Votes	%
Republican	Jackie Walorski (incumbent)	42,952	78.6
Republican	Mark Summe	11,666	21.4
Total votes		54,618	100

=== Democratic primary ===
The Democratic Congressional Campaign Committee included Indiana's 2nd congressional district on its initial list of Republican-held seats considered targets in 2018.

==== Candidates ====
===== Nominee =====
- Mel Hall, businessman

===== Eliminated in primary =====
- Douglas Carpenter, candidate for this seat in 2014
- Pat Hackett, attorney
- Yatish Joshi, businessman
- Roland Leech
- John Petroff, school bus driver

===== Withdrawn =====
- Aaron Bush

==== Primary results ====
Democratic primary results
Party	Candidate	Votes	%
Democratic	Mel Hall	15,384	41.7
Democratic	Pat Hackett	10,420	28.2
Democratic	Yatish Joshi	8,155	22.1
Democratic	Douglas Carpenter	1,949	5.3
Democratic	John Petroff	569	1.5
Democratic	Roland Leech	450	1.2
Total votes		36,927	100.0

=== General election ===
==== Endorsements ====
Mel Hall (D)

Labor unions

- United Food and Commercial Workers

Organizations

- Democratic Congressional Campaign Committee "Red to Blue" Program
- End Citizens United

==== Predictions ====
Source	Ranking	As of
The Cook Political Report	Likely R	November 5, 2018
Inside Elections	Likely R	November 5, 2018
Sabato's Crystal Ball	Likely R	November 5, 2018
RCP	Likely R	November 5, 2018
Daily Kos	Likely R	November 5, 2018
538	Safe R	November 7, 2018
CNN	Likely R	October 31, 2018
Politico	Likely R	November 4, 2018

==== Results ====
Indiana's 2nd congressional district, 2018
Party	Candidate	Votes	%
Republican	Jackie Walorski (incumbent)	125,499	54.8
Democratic	Mel Hall	103,363	45.2
Independent	Richard Wolf (write-in)	27	0.0
Total votes		228,889	100.0
Republican hold			

== District 3 ==
2018 Indiana's 3rd congressional district election
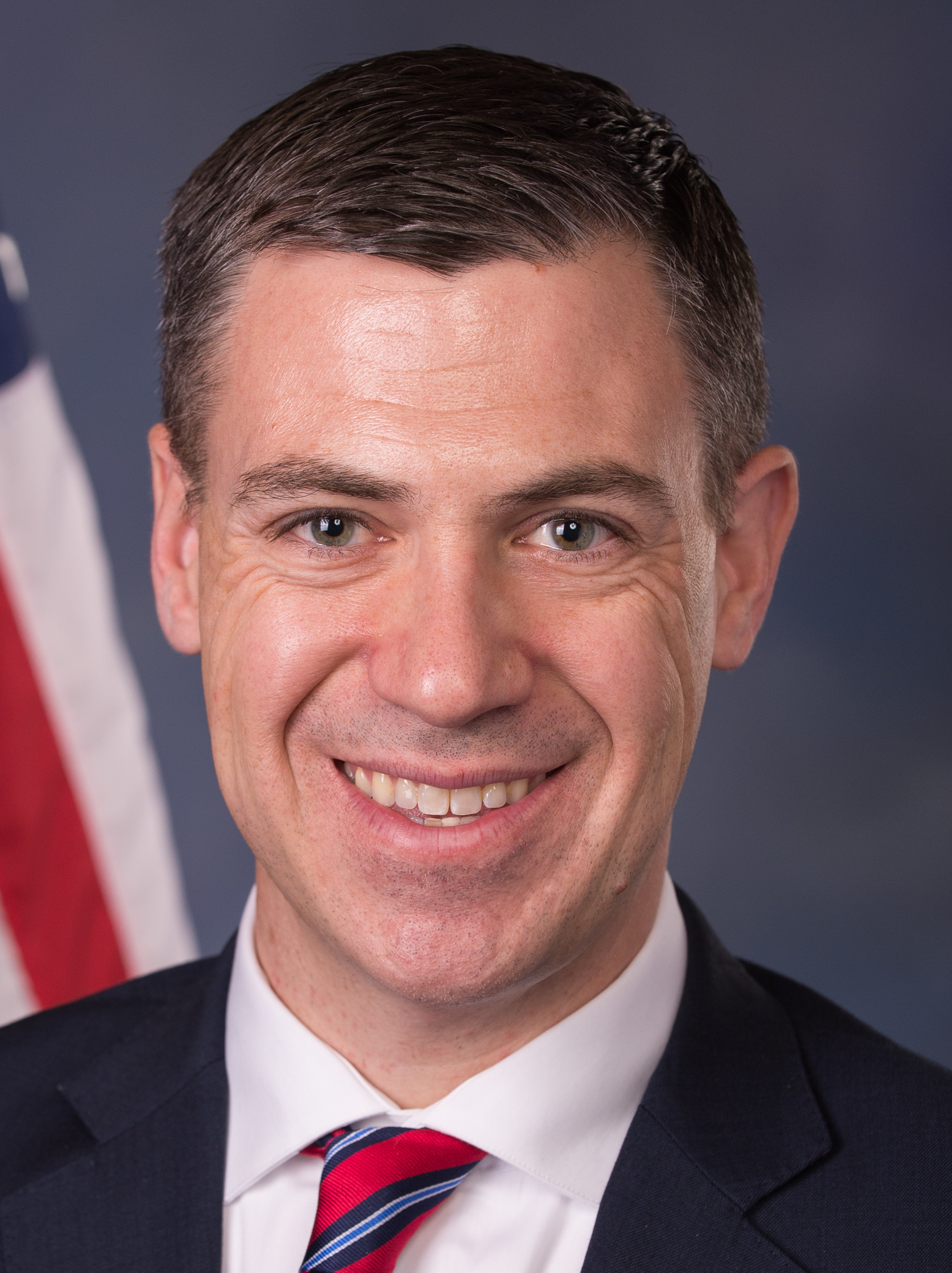

Nominee	Jim Banks	Courtney Tritch
Party	Republican	Democratic
Popular vote	158,927	86,610
Percentage	64.7%	35.3%
- County results Banks: 50–60% 60–70% 70–80%
U.S. Representative before election
Jim Banks
Republican
Elected U.S. Representative
Jim Banks
Republican

Incumbent Republican Jim Banks, who had represented the district since 2017, ran for re-election. He was elected with 70% of the vote in 2016. The district had a PVI of R+18.

=== Republican primary ===
==== Candidates ====
===== Nominee =====
- Jim Banks, incumbent U.S. representative

==== Primary results ====
Republican primary results
Party	Candidate	Votes	%
Republican	Jim Banks (incumbent)	58,738	100.0
Total votes		58,738	100

=== Democratic primary ===
==== Candidates ====
===== Nominee =====
- Courtney Tritch, businesswoman

===== Eliminated in primary =====
- John Roberson, former police officer
- Tommy Schrader

==== Primary results ====
Democratic primary results
Party	Candidate	Votes	%
Democratic	Courtney Tritch	16,376	79.1
Democratic	Tommy Schrader	2,224	10.7
Democratic	John Roberson	2,115	10.2
Total votes		20,715	100.0

=== General election ===
==== Predictions ====
Source	Ranking	As of
The Cook Political Report	Safe R	November 5, 2018
Inside Elections	Safe R	November 5, 2018
Sabato's Crystal Ball	Safe R	November 5, 2018
RCP	Safe R	November 5, 2018
Daily Kos	Safe R	November 5, 2018
538	Safe R	November 7, 2018
CNN	Safe R	October 31, 2018
Politico	Safe R	November 4, 2018

==== Polling ====
Poll source	Date(s) administered	Sample size	Margin of error	Jim Banks (R)	Courtney Tritch (D)	Undecided
WPA Intelligence (R-Banks)	May 29–31, 2018	401	–	55%	34%	11%

==== Results ====
Indiana's 3rd congressional district, 2018
Party	Candidate	Votes	%
Republican	Jim Banks (incumbent)	158,927	64.7
Democratic	Courtney Tritch	86,610	35.3
Total votes		245,537	100.0
Republican hold			

== District 4 ==
2018 Indiana's 4th congressional district election
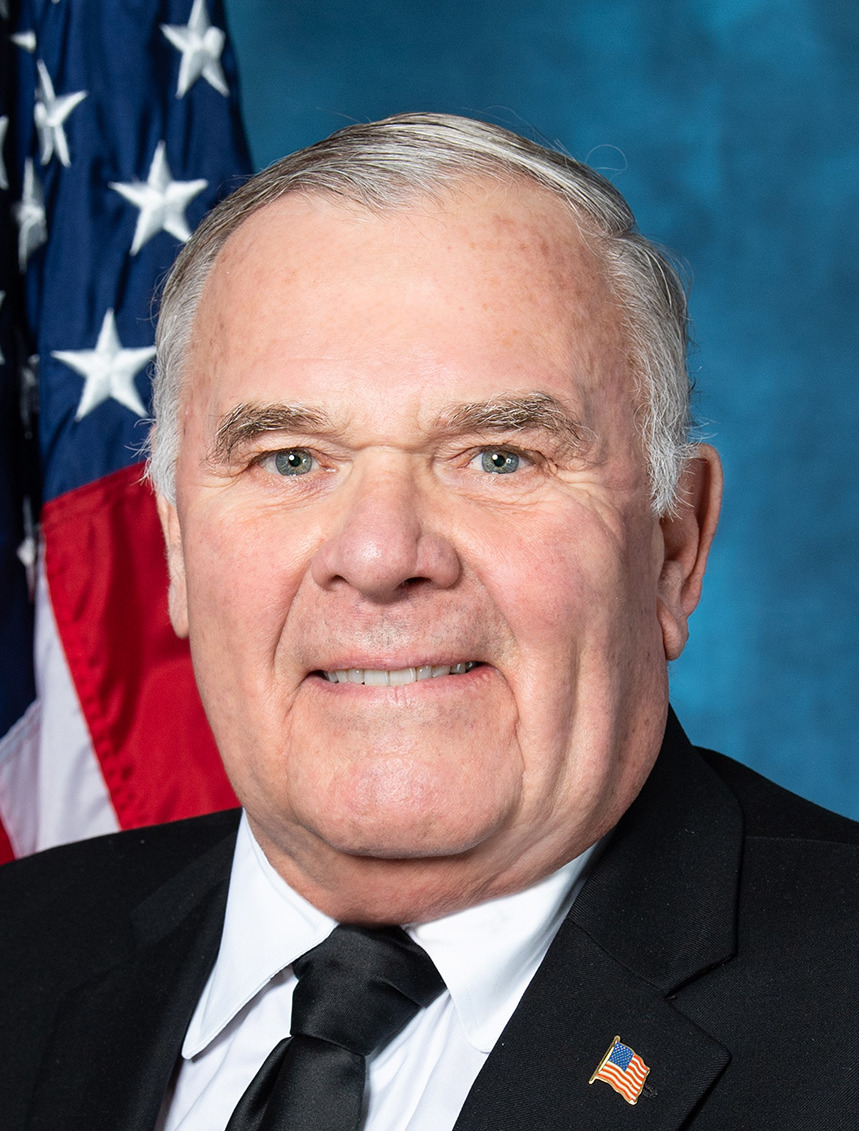

Nominee	Jim Baird	Tobi Beck
Party	Republican	Democratic
Popular vote	156,539	87,824
Percentage	64.1%	35.9%
- County results Baird: 50–60% 60–70% 70–80%
U.S. Representative before election
Todd Rokita
Republican
Elected U.S. Representative
Jim Baird
Republican

Incumbent Republican Todd Rokita, who had represented the district since 2011, did not run for reelection, as he entered the Republican primary for the Indiana senate race. He was re-elected with 65% of the vote in 2016. The district had a PVI of R+17.

=== Republican primary ===
==== Candidates ====
===== Nominee =====
- Jim Baird, state representative

===== Eliminated in primary =====
- Steve Braun, former state representative
- Kevin Grant
- Diego Morales, former aide to Governor Mike Pence
- James Nease
- Tim Radice
- Jared Thomas, former U.S. Army captain

===== Declined =====
- Todd Rokita, incumbent U.S. representative

==== Primary results ====
Results by county: Baird: 20–30%; 30–40%; 40–50%; 50–60%; 70–80%; Braun: 30–40%; 40–50%

Republican primary results
Party	Candidate	Votes	%
Republican	Jim Baird	29,316	36.6
Republican	Steve Braun	23,594	29.4
Republican	Diego Morales	11,994	15.0
Republican	Jared Thomas	8,453	10.5
Republican	Kevin Grant	3,667	4.6
Republican	James Nease	2,096	2.6
Republican	Tim Radice	1,022	1.3
Total votes		80,142	100.0

=== Democratic primary ===
==== Candidates ====
===== Nominee =====
- Tobi Beck, security technology designer

===== Eliminated in primary =====
- Roger Day
- Roland Ellis
- Darin Patrick Griesey, retired machinist
- Joe Mackey
- Veronikka Ziol

==== Primary results ====
Democratic primary results
Party	Candidate	Votes	%
Democratic	Tobi Beck	6,466	34.6
Democratic	Veronikka Ziol	3,938	21.1
Democratic	Joe Mackey	3,012	16.1
Democratic	Roger Day	2,324	12.4
Democratic	Roland Ellis	1,712	9.2
Democratic	Darin Patrick Griesey	1,249	6.7
Total votes		18,701	100.0

=== General election ===
==== Predictions ====
Source	Ranking	As of
The Cook Political Report	Safe R	November 5, 2018
Inside Elections	Safe R	November 5, 2018
Sabato's Crystal Ball	Safe R	November 5, 2018
RCP	Safe R	November 5, 2018
Daily Kos	Safe R	November 5, 2018
538	Safe R	November 7, 2018
CNN	Safe R	October 31, 2018
Politico	Safe R	November 4, 2018

==== Results ====
Indiana's 4th congressional district, 2018
Party	Candidate	Votes	%
Republican	James Baird	156,539	64.1
Democratic	Tobi Beck	87,824	35.9
Total votes		244,363	100.0
Republican hold			

== District 5 ==
2018 Indiana's 5th congressional district election
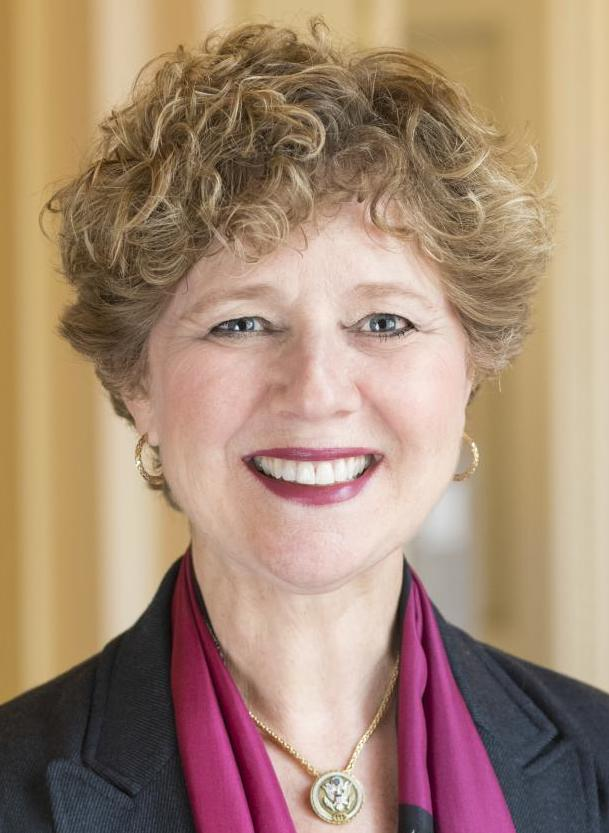

Nominee	Susan Brooks	Dee Thornton
Party	Republican	Democratic
Popular vote	180,035	137,142
Percentage	56.8%	43.2%
- County results Brooks: 60–70% 70–80% Thornton: 50–60%
U.S. Representative before election
Susan Brooks
Republican
Elected U.S. Representative
Susan Brooks
Republican

Incumbent Republican Susan Brooks, who had represented the district since 2013, ran for re-election. She was re-elected with 61% of the vote in 2016. The district had a PVI of R+9.

=== Republican primary ===
==== Candidates ====
===== Nominee =====
- Susan Brooks, incumbent U.S. representative

==== Primary results ====
Republican primary results
Party	Candidate	Votes	%
Republican	Susan Brooks (incumbent)	63,901	100.0
Total votes		63,901	100.0

=== Democratic primary ===
==== Candidates ====
===== Nominee =====
- Dee Thornton, businesswoman

===== Eliminated in primary =====
- Dion Douglas
- Sean Dugdale
- Eshel Faraggi, biophysicist and professor
- Kyle Brenden Moore, businessman

==== Primary results ====
Democratic primary results
Party	Candidate	Votes	%
Democratic	Dee Thornton	18,073	53.0
Democratic	Kyle Brenden Moore	8,077	23.7
Democratic	Dion Douglas	3,520	10.3
Democratic	Eshel Faraggi	2,583	7.6
Democratic	Sean Dugdale	1,858	5.4
Total votes		34,111	100.0

=== General election ===
==== Predictions ====
Source	Ranking	As of
The Cook Political Report	Safe R	November 5, 2018
Inside Elections	Safe R	November 5, 2018
Sabato's Crystal Ball	Safe R	November 5, 2018
RCP	Safe R	November 5, 2018
Daily Kos	Safe R	November 5, 2018
538	Safe R	November 7, 2018
CNN	Safe R	October 31, 2018
Politico	Safe R	November 4, 2018

==== Polling ====
Poll source	Date(s) administered	Sample size	Margin of error	Susan Brooks (R)	Dee Thornton (D)	Undecided
Change Research (D)	October 27–29, 2018	527	–	50%	44%	6%

==== Results ====
Indiana's 5th congressional district, 2018
Party	Candidate	Votes	%
Republican	Susan Brooks (incumbent)	180,035	56.8
Democratic	Dee Thornton	137,142	43.2
Total votes		317,177	100.0
Republican hold			

== District 6 ==
2018 Indiana's 6th congressional district election
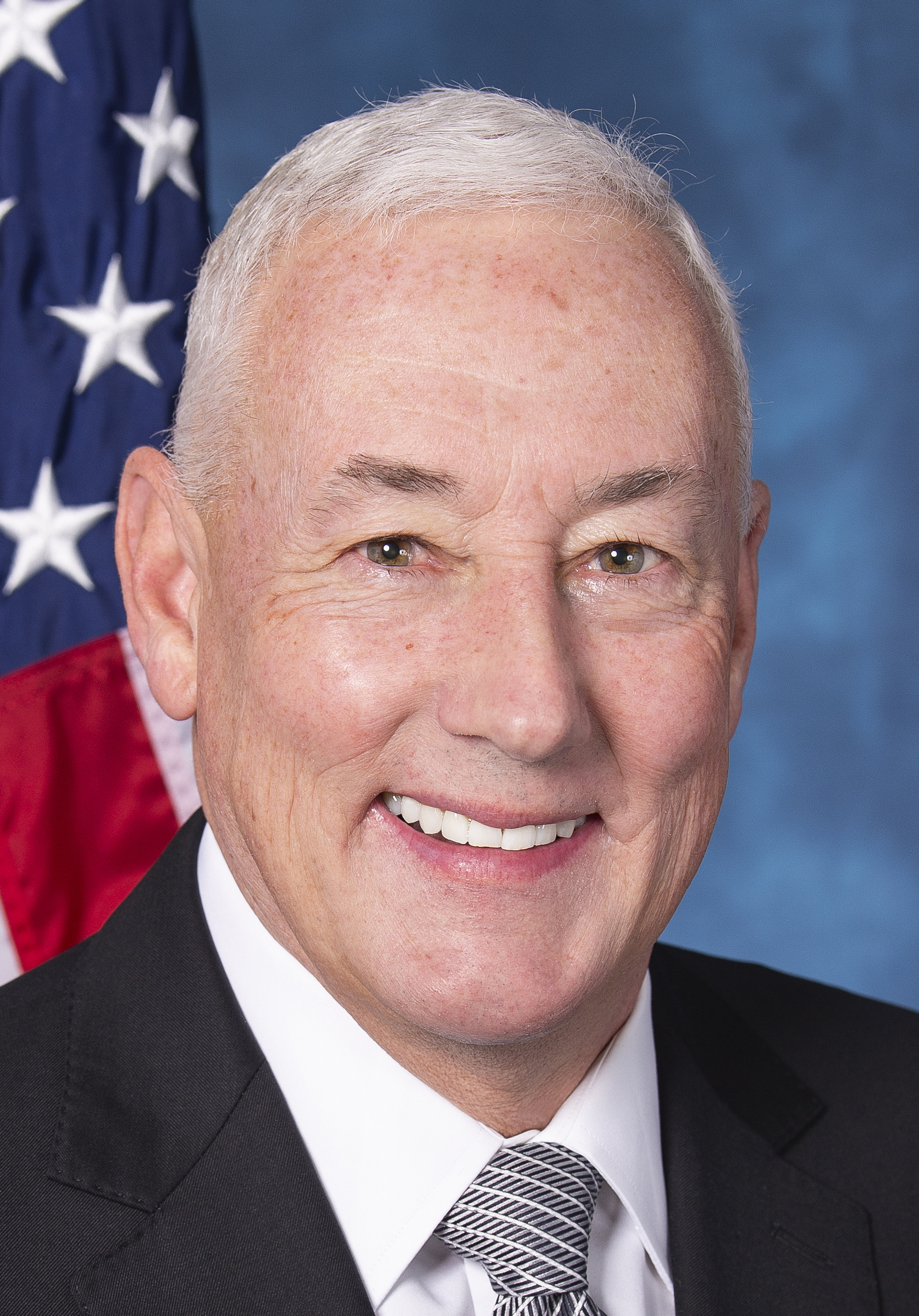

Nominee	Greg Pence	Jeannine Lake
Party	Republican	Democratic
Popular vote	154,260	79,430
Percentage	63.8%	32.9%
- County results Pence: 50–60% 60–70% 70–80% Lake: 40–50%
U.S. Representative before election
Luke Messer
Republican
Elected U.S. Representative
Greg Pence
Republican

Incumbent Republican Luke Messer, who had represented the district since 2013, did not run for re-election as he entered into the Republican primary for the Indiana senate race. He was re-elected with 69% of the vote in 2016. The district had a PVI of R+18.

=== Republican primary ===
==== Candidates ====
===== Nominee =====
- Greg Pence, mall owner and brother of Vice President Mike Pence

===== Eliminated in primary =====
- Mike Campbell
- Jonathan Lamb, economist
- Stephen MacKenzie, small business owner
- Jeff Smith, manufacturing trainer

===== Declined =====
- Luke Messer, incumbent U.S. representative

==== Primary results ====
Republican primary results
Party	Candidate	Votes	%
Republican	Greg Pence	47,955	65.3
Republican	Jonathan Lamb	17,523	23.9
Republican	Mike Campbell	3,229	4.4
Republican	Stephen MacKenzie	2,500	3.4
Republican	Jeff Smith	2,258	3.1
Total votes		73,465	100.0

=== Democratic primary ===
==== Candidates ====
===== Nominee =====
- Jeannine Lee Lake, publisher and CEO

===== Eliminated in primary =====
- George Holland, pharmaceutical salesman
- K. Jasen Lave, writer and musician
- Jim Pruett, attorney
- Lane Siekman, attorney
- Joshua Williamson, industrial technician

==== Primary results ====
Democratic primary results
Party	Candidate	Votes	%
Democratic	Jeannine Lee Lake	8,887	38.3
Democratic	Jim Pruett	5,981	25.8
Democratic	Lane Siekman	3,606	15.6
Democratic	George Holland	2,567	11.1
Democratic	Joshua Williamson	1,695	7.3
Democratic	Jasen Lave	446	1.9
Total votes		23,182	100.0

=== General election ===
==== Predictions ====
Source	Ranking	As of
The Cook Political Report	Safe R	November 5, 2018
Inside Elections	Safe R	November 5, 2018
Sabato's Crystal Ball	Safe R	November 5, 2018
RCP	Safe R	November 5, 2018
Daily Kos	Safe R	November 5, 2018
538	Safe R	November 7, 2018
CNN	Safe R	October 31, 2018
Politico	Safe R	November 4, 2018

==== Results ====
Indiana's 6th congressional district, 2018
Party	Candidate	Votes	%
Republican	Greg Pence	154,260	63.8
Democratic	Jeannine Lee Lake	79,430	32.9
Libertarian	Tom Ferkinhoff	8,030	3.3
Independent	John Miller (write-in)	5	0.0
Independent	Heather Leigh Meloy (write-in)	1	0.0
Total votes		241,726	100.0
Republican hold			

== District 7 ==
2018 Indiana's 7th congressional district election
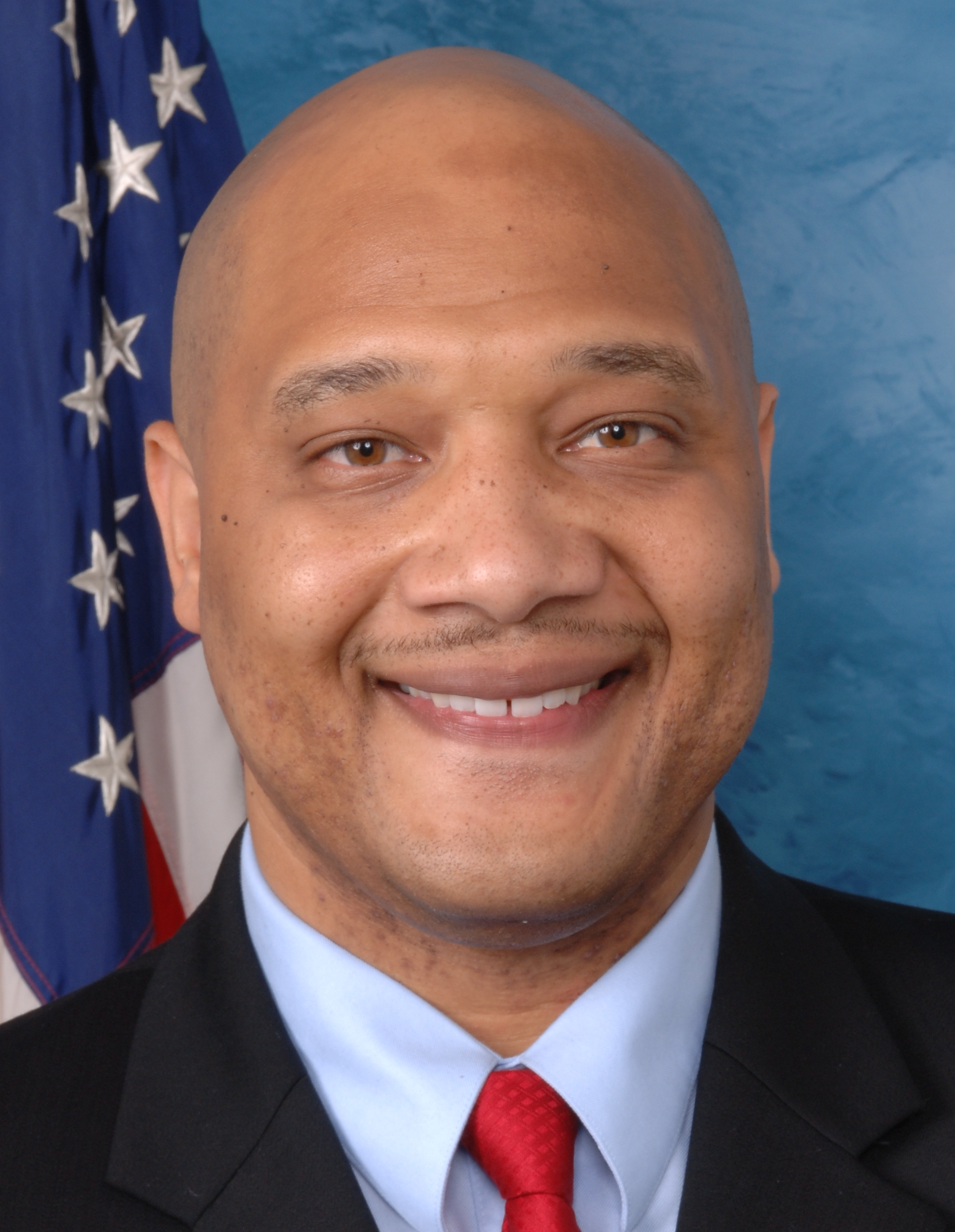

Nominee	André Carson	Susan Marie Smith
Party	Democratic	Republican
Popular vote	141,139	76,457
Percentage	64.9%	35.1%
- County results Carson: 60–70%
U.S. Representative before election
André Carson
Democratic
Elected U.S. Representative
André Carson
Democratic

Incumbent Democrat André Carson, who had represented the district since 2008, ran for re-election. He was re-elected with 60% of the vote in 2016. The district had a PVI of D+11.

=== Democratic primary ===
==== Candidates ====
===== Nominee =====
- André Carson, incumbent U.S. representative

===== Eliminated in primary =====
- Curtis Godfrey
- Bob Kern
- Pierre Pullins
- Sue Spicer, business owner

==== Primary results ====
Democratic primary results
Party	Candidate	Votes	%
Democratic	André Carson (incumbent)	37,401	87.9
Democratic	Sue Spicer	3,485	8.2
Democratic	Curtis Godfrey	723	1.7
Democratic	Bob Kern	703	1.7
Democratic	Pierre Pullins	224	0.5
Total votes		42,356	100.0

=== Republican primary ===
==== Candidates ====
===== Nominee =====
- Wayne Harmon

===== Eliminated in primary =====
- John L. Couch
- J. Jason Davis
- Donald Eason Jr.
- J.D. Miniear
- Tony Van Pelt

==== Primary results ====
Republican primary results
Party	Candidate	Votes	%
Republican	Wayne Harmon	6,534	28.8
Republican	Donald Eason Jr.	4,343	19.2
Republican	John L. Couch	3,461	15.3
Republican	J.D. Miniear	3,079	13.6
Republican	J. Jason Davis	2,697	11.9
Republican	Tony Van Pelt	2,561	11.3
Total votes		22,675	100.0

=== General election ===
==== Predictions ====
Source	Ranking	As of
The Cook Political Report	Safe D	November 5, 2018
Inside Elections	Safe D	November 5, 2018
Sabato's Crystal Ball	Safe D	November 5, 2018
RCP	Safe D	November 5, 2018
Daily Kos	Safe D	November 5, 2018
538	Safe D	November 7, 2018
CNN	Safe D	October 31, 2018
Politico	Safe D	November 4, 2018

==== Results ====
Indiana's 7th congressional district, 2018
Party	Candidate	Votes	%
Democratic	André Carson (incumbent)	141,139	64.9
Republican	Wayne Harmon	76,457	35.1
Total votes		217,596	100.0
Democratic hold			

== District 8 ==
2018 Indiana's 8th congressional district election
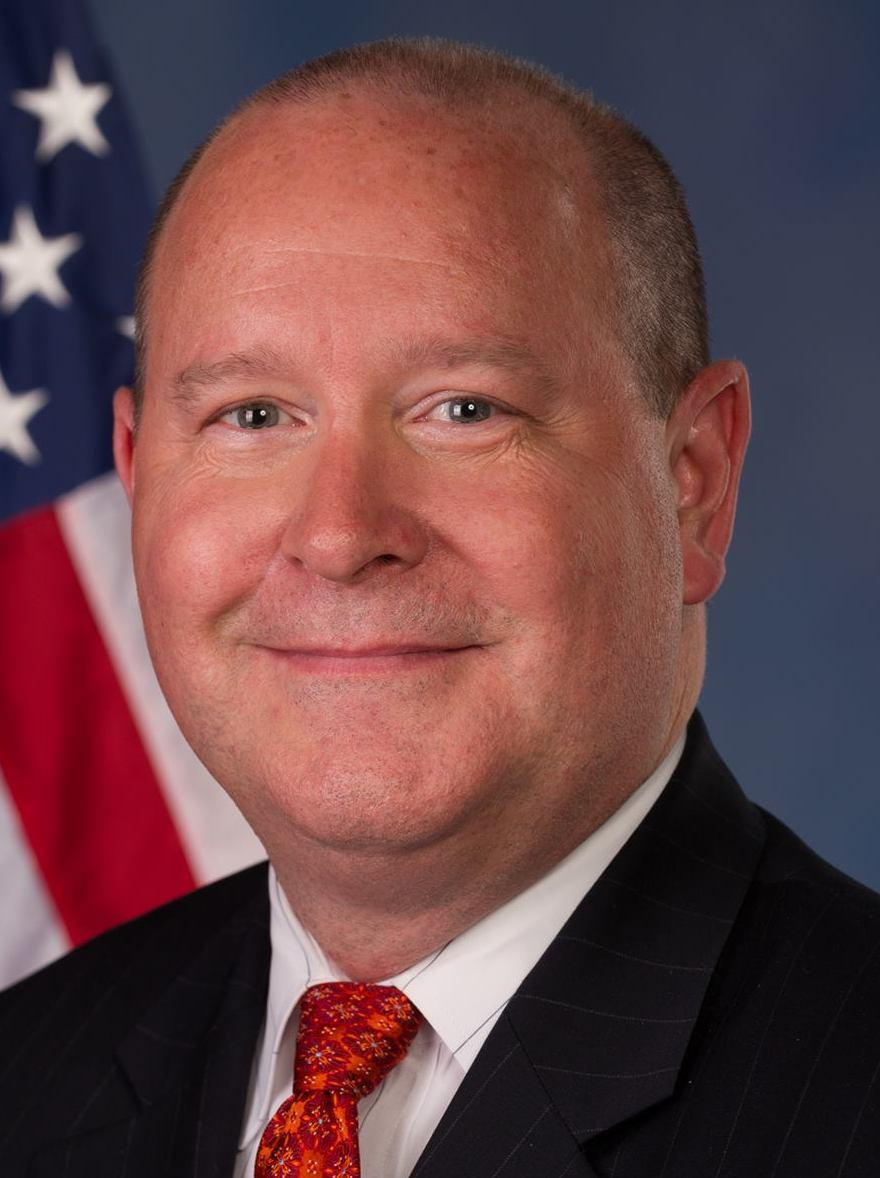

Nominee	Larry Bucshon	William Tanoos
Party	Republican	Democratic
Popular vote	157,396	86,895
Percentage	64.4%	35.6%
- County results Bucshon: 50–60% 60–70% 70–80% 80–90%
U.S. Representative before election
Larry Bucshon
Republican
Elected U.S. Representative
Larry Bucshon
Republican

Incumbent Republican Larry Bucshon, who had represented the district since 2011, ran for re-election. He was re-elected with 64% of the vote in 2016. The district had a PVI of R+15.

=== Republican primary ===
==== Candidates ====
===== Nominee =====
- Larry Bucshon, incumbent U.S. representative

===== Eliminated in primary =====
- Rachel Covington, teacher
- Richard Moss, otolaryngologist

==== Primary results ====
Republican primary results
Party	Candidate	Votes	%
Republican	Larry Bucshon (incumbent)	34,502	59.7
Republican	Richard Moss	15,396	26.6
Republican	Rachel Covington	7,924	13.7
Total votes		57,822	100.0

=== Democratic primary ===
==== Candidates ====
===== Nominee =====
- William Tanoos, attorney

==== Primary results ====
Democratic primary results
Party	Candidate	Votes	%
Democratic	William Tanoos	25,472	100.0
Total votes		25,472	100.0

=== General election ===
==== Predictions ====
Source	Ranking	As of
The Cook Political Report	Safe R	November 5, 2018
Inside Elections	Safe R	November 5, 2018
Sabato's Crystal Ball	Safe R	November 5, 2018
RCP	Safe R	November 5, 2018
Daily Kos	Safe R	November 5, 2018
538	Safe R	November 7, 2018
CNN	Safe R	October 31, 2018
Politico	Safe R	November 4, 2018

==== Results ====
Indiana's 8th congressional district, 2018
Party	Candidate	Votes	%
Republican	Larry Bucshon (incumbent)	157,396	64.4
Democratic	William Tanoos	86,895	35.6
Total votes		244,291	100.0
Republican hold			

== District 9 ==
2018 Indiana's 9th congressional district election
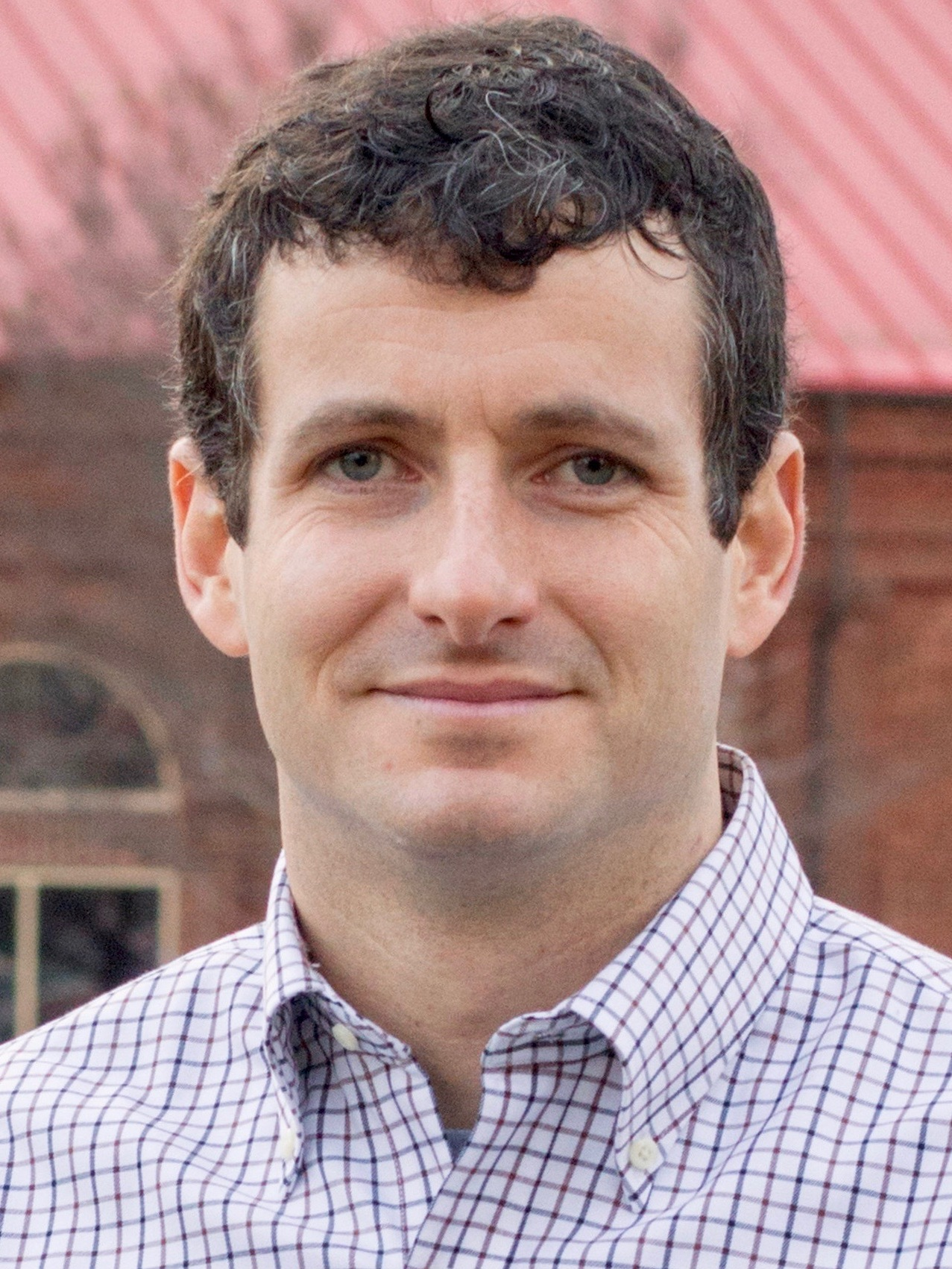

Nominee	Trey Hollingsworth	Liz Watson
Party	Republican	Democratic
Popular vote	153,271	118,090
Percentage	56.5%	43.5%
- County results Hollingsworth: 50–60% 60–70% 70–80% Watson: 60–70%
U.S. Representative before election
Trey Hollingsworth
Republican
Elected U.S. Representative
Trey Hollingsworth
Republican

Incumbent Republican Trey Hollingsworth, who had represented the district since 2017, ran for re-election. He was elected with 54% of the vote in 2016. The district had a PVI of R+13.

=== Republican primary ===
==== Candidates ====
===== Nominee =====
- Trey Hollingsworth, incumbent U.S. representative

===== Eliminated in primary =====
- James Dean Alspach

==== Primary results ====
Republican primary results
Party	Candidate	Votes	%
Republican	Trey Hollingsworth (incumbent)	46,884	77.7
Republican	James Dean Alspach	13,445	22.3
Total votes		60,329	100.0

=== Democratic primary ===
The Democratic Congressional Campaign Committee included Indiana's 9th congressional district on its initial list of Republican-held seats considered targets in 2018.

==== Candidates ====
===== Nominee =====
- Liz Watson, labor attorney

===== Eliminated in primary =====
- Dan Canon, attorney
- Rob Chatlos, self-employed

==== Primary results ====
Democratic primary results
Party	Candidate	Votes	%
Democratic	Liz Watson	24,981	66.4
Democratic	Dan Canon	11,549	30.7
Democratic	Rob Chatlos	1,100	2.9
Total votes		37,630	100.0

=== General election ===
==== Endorsements ====
Liz Watson (D)

Organizations

- Democratic Congressional Campaign Committee "Red to Blue" Program
- EMILY's List
- End Citizens United

==== Polling ====
Poll source	Date(s) administered	Sample size	Margin of error	Trey Hollingsworth (R)	Liz Watson (D)	Undecided
Change Research (D)	October 27–29, 2018	541	–	52%	45%	–

==== Predictions ====
Source	Ranking	As of
The Cook Political Report	Safe R	November 5, 2018
Inside Elections	Safe R	November 5, 2018
Sabato's Crystal Ball	Likely R	November 5, 2018
RCP	Safe R	November 5, 2018
Daily Kos	Likely R	November 5, 2018
538	Likely R	November 7, 2018
CNN	Likely R	October 31, 2018
Politico	Likely R	November 4, 2018

==== Results ====
Indiana's 9th congressional district, 2018
Party	Candidate	Votes	%
Republican	Trey Hollingsworth (incumbent)	153,271	56.5
Democratic	Liz Watson	118,090	43.5
Total votes		271,361	100.0
Republican hold			
