= Robert L. Fischman =

American legal academic

Robert L. Fischman is the George P. Smith, II Distinguished Professor of Law at the Indiana University Maurer School of Law in Bloomington, Indiana. He is also an adjunct professor at the Indiana University School of Public and Environmental Affairs.

Fischman graduated from Princeton University in 1984 and from the University of Michigan Law School in 1987, where he was elected to the Order of the Coif. He taught at the University of Wyoming College of Law and served as staff attorney at the Environmental Law Institute in Washington, D.C. In 1992 he joined the faculty of the Maurer School of Law. He helped establish the school's Conservation Law Center, and served on its founding board. Fischman is best known for his scholarship on the relationship between conservation-in-action and law governing the federal public lands, particularly the national wildlife refuges.

== Selected works ==
- Judging Adaptive Management Practices of U.S. Agencies, (with J.B. Ruhl) 30 CONSERVATION BIOLOGY 268-275 (2016).
- Planning for Adaptation to Climate Change: Lessons from the US National Wildlife Refuge System (with Vicky Meretsky et al.) 64 BIOSCIENCE 993 (2014).
- Learning from Conservation Planning for the U.S. National Wildlife Refuges, 28 CONSERVATION BIOLOGY 1415 (2014).
- Beyond Trust Species: The Conservation Potential of the National Wildlife Refuge System in the Wake of Climate Change (with Bob Adamcik), 51 NAT. RESOURCES J. 1 (2011).
- The Story of Kleppe v. New Mexico: The Sagebrush Rebellion as Un-Cooperative Federalism (with Jeremiah Williamson), 83 U. COLO. L. REV. 123 (2011).
