= Conservation Roundtable =

American nature conservation organization

The Conservation Roundtable is a collation of executives representing America's top hunting, fishing and environmental organizations, who meet annually to discuss opportunities for collaboration and conservation. The organizations of this Roundtable collectively represent ten million Americans, tens of millions of acres conserved, and hundreds of years of conservation experience.”

Founded by Simon C. Roosevelt, the Conservation Roundtable Conferences are sponsored by The Rockefeller Brothers Fund, and hosted each year by Mr. Roosevelt and Allison Whipple Rockefeller at the Pocantico Conference Center on the Rockefeller Family estate. According to Dale Hall, CEO of Ducks Unlimited, "The primary purpose is to bring together the leadership of major non-government organizations to see how we can focus on substantive issues that we all share."

Former efforts include the publishing of an open letter to President Obama, Congressman John Boehner and Senator Harry Reid in Politico to encourage government “to find practical ways to make stewardship today more inclusive, concerted, and effective.”

While the Conservation Roundtable consists of non-government organizations, the group works alongside politicians and government offices. Most recently, a meeting of the Conservation Roundtable convened at the Department of the Interior under the auspices of the Secretary of the Interior Ryan Zinke, co-hosted by Roosevelt, bringing together an even larger group of private conservation organizations and the senior most officials in the department. The purpose of the meeting was to advance collaborative thought and action on both the interior department's agenda and priorities of the NGOs.

== Participants ==
- Lowell Baier – Boone & Crockett Club, President Emeritus
- Ben Carter – Dallas Safari Club, President
- Jamie Clark – Defenders of Wildlife, President and CEO
- Dale Hall – Ducks Unlimited, CEO
- Winifred B. Kessler – The Wildlife Society, President
- Fred Krupp – Environmental Defense Fund, President
- Larry Schweiger – National Wildlife Federation, President and CEO
- Mark Tercek – The Nature Conservancy, CEO
- George Thornton – National Wild Turkey Federation, CEO
- Howard Vincent – Pheasants Forever, President and CEO
- Jamie Williams – The Wilderness Society, President
- Chris Wood – Trout Unlimited, President
- David Yarnold – The National Audubon Society, President
