= Susan Hoffman Williams =

American legal academic (born 1960)

Susan Hoffman Williams (born July 12, 1960) is an American legal academic.

She completed a bachelor's degree at Harvard University and earned a J. D. from Harvard Law School. Williams then taught at Cornell Law School before joining the Indiana University Maurer School of Law in 1992. She was named Walter W. Foskett Professor of Law at Indiana in 2002.
