= Hannah L. Buxbaum =

American academic administrator

Hannah L. Buxbaum (born 1966) is the Martin Luther King Jr. Professor of Law at the University of California Davis, where she has taught since 2025. She was formerly vice president for international affairs at Indiana University. She was a professor at the Indiana University Maurer School of Law in Bloomington, Indiana, where she held the John E. Schiller Chair in Legal Ethics. She was appointed vice president for international affairs in 2018. From 2015-2018, she served as the inaugural academic director of the IU Europe Gateway in Berlin.

Buxbaum graduated cum laude from Cornell University in 1987 and earned a J.D. magna cum laude from its law school in 1992. She also received an LL.M. summa cum laude from the University of Heidelberg in 1993. She joined the Indiana University law school faculty in 1997 after practicing in the area of international securities transactions in the New York and Frankfurt offices of Davis Polk & Wardwell. From January 2012 through December 2013, she served as the law school's interim dean. She teaches and writes in the area of contracts, international business transactions, comparative civil litigation, and conflict of laws. She serves on the executive committee of the International Association of Legal Science. In Morrison v. National Australia Bank, Justice Antonin Scalia's majority opinion and Justice John Paul Stevens' concurrence cited her article "Multinational Class Actions Under Federal Securities Law: Managing Jurisdictional Conflict,” published in the Columbia Journal of Transnational Law.

== Selected works ==
=== Books ===
- TRANSNATIONAL BUSINESS PROBLEMS (with Detlev Vagts, William Dodge and Harold Koh) (Foundation Press 5th ed. 2014).
- A CONFLICT-OF-LAWS ANTHOLOGY (second edition) (with Gene R. Shreve) (LexisNexis 2d. ed. 2012).

=== Articles ===
- Determining the Territorial Scope of State Law in Interstate and International Conflicts: Comments on the Draft Restatement (Third) and on the Role of Party Autonomy, 27 DUKE J. COMP. & INT'L. L. 381 (2017).
- Transnational Legal Ordering and Regulatory Conflict: Lessons From the Regulation of Cross-Border Derivatives, 1 U.C. IRVINE J. INT'L., TRANSNAT'L & COMP. L. (2017).
- Foreign Governments as Plaintiffs in U.S. Courts and the Case Against "Judicial Imperialism," 73 WASH. & LEE L. REV. 653 (2016).
- The Viability of Enterprise Jurisdiction: A Case Study of the Big Four Accounting Firms, 48 U.C. DAVIS L. REV. 1769 (2015).
