= Indiana Journal of Global Legal Studies =

Law journal

The Indiana Journal of Global Legal Studies (IJGLS) is a peer-reviewed law journal published twice a year by Indiana University Press in partnership with the Indiana University Maurer School of Law. Founded in 1993, the journal covers international law, globalization, and the intersection of legal systems with economics, politics, and culture. It is indexed in Scopus, JSTOR, Project MUSE, and HeinOnline.

== History ==
Alfred C. Aman Jr., then dean of Indiana University's law school, and Jost Delbruck co-founded the journal in 1992, with the first issue appearing in 1993. Aman wanted a venue for scholars from different disciplines to tackle legal problems that crossed national borders, at a time when "globalization" had not yet entered the mainstream vocabulary. The inaugural issue grew out of a March 1993 conference titled "The Globalization of Law, Politics, and Markets: New Perspectives on Domestic Law Reform," held at the law school as part of Indiana University's sesquicentennial celebrations.

The IJGLS is student-ran. A team of 2L and 3L law students work together to produce the journal. Students handle editing and production, while faculty sit on the editorial board and peer-review outside submissions. Journal members are selected to join the IJGLS after completing a traditional journal write-on process following the conclusion of a student's first year. The journal combines domestic, international, and comparative law and draws on economics, political science, philosophy, anthropology, and other fields.

The journal has hosted annual symposia since its early years, often at the Maurer School of Law. In March 2017, IJGLS held a two-day event in Baier Hall's Moot Court Room marking 25 years of publication. Its January 2025 symposium examined the role of lawyers in countries experiencing democratic decline.

== Indexing and rankings ==
IJGLS appears in several major academic databases and ranking systems. The Washington and Lee University School of Law law journal rankings, which derives its data from Westlaw citation data, placed IJGLS tied for 21st among comparative and international law journals by total cites in 2006.

A 2016 analysis on EJIL: Talk!, the blog of the European Journal of International Law, noted that the journal's ranking varied significantly depending on which metric was used: 16th among international law journals by Google Scholar metrics, 38th by raw citation count in the Washington and Lee data, and 61st by impact factor.

According to SCImago Journal Rank, the journal holds a Q3 quartile classification with an SJR of 0.192. Resurchify reports an h-index of 19.

The journal's content becomes freely available three years after publication.

== See also ==
- List of law journals
