= Greg Pence =

American businessman and politician (born 1956)

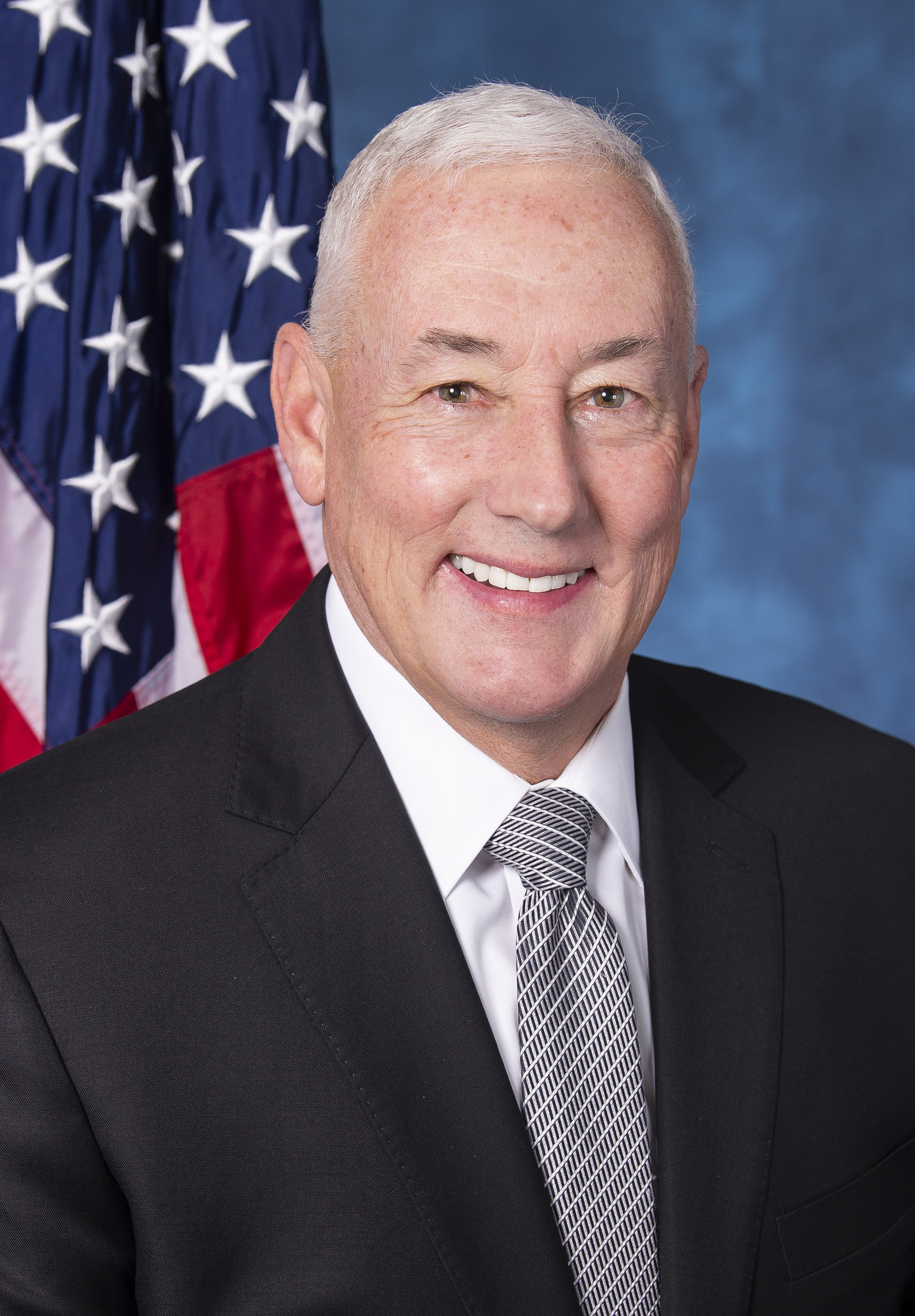
- Official portrait, 2019

Member of the U.S. House of Representatives from Indiana's 6th district
- In office January 3, 2019 – January 3, 2025
- Preceded by: Luke Messer
- Succeeded by: Jefferson Shreve

Personal details
- Born: Gregory Joseph Pence; November 14, 1956 (age 69) Columbus, Indiana, U.S.
- Party: Republican
- Spouse: Denise Pence (m. 1981)
- Children: 4, including John
- Relatives: Mike Pence (brother); Pence family
- Education: Loyola University Chicago (BA, MBA)

Military service
- Allegiance: United States
- Branch/service: United States Marine Corps
- Years of service: 1979–1984
- Rank: First Lieutenant
- Pence's voice Pence supporting a bill on fair market prices. Recorded November 3, 2021

Gregory Joseph Pence (born November 14, 1956) is an American businessman and politician who served as the U.S. representative for Indiana's 6th congressional district from 2019 to 2025. A member of the Republican Party, he is the older brother of former U.S. vice president Mike Pence, who represented the district from 2001 to 2013.

The district Pence served included much of east-central Indiana, including Pence's hometown of Columbus, as well as Greenfield, Richmond, Shelbyville, and the southern third of Indianapolis.

In January 2024, Pence announced that he would not be running for re-election to the 119th United States Congress.

== Early life ==
Born in Columbus, Indiana, on November 14, 1956, Pence is the oldest of six children born to his parents, Ann Jane "Nancy" (née Cawley) and Edward Joseph Pence Jr., who ran a group of gas stations. He was raised in the Catholic faith. According to his mother, Pence and his three brothers rode wagons in a 1964 campaign parade for Republican presidential nominee Barry Goldwater.

Pence earned a B.A. in theology and philosophy and a Master of Business Administration in 1983 from Loyola University Chicago. He earned a commission in the Marines in 1981 after receiving his undergraduate degree and served for five and a half years, rising to the rank of first lieutenant. In 1983, his battalion was stationed in Beirut, Lebanon, and shipped out shortly before the bombings.

== Business career ==
Pence owns and operates antique malls in southern Indiana.

After being honorably discharged from the Marine Corps, Pence joined Kiel Brothers Oil Company in 1988, after his father died, and served as its president from 1998 to 2004. After his departure, the company filed for Chapter 11 bankruptcy protection in 2004. Through the company, he also ran a chain of gas stations and convenience stores.

According to some reports, the cleanup from the defunct business sites has cost Indiana at least $21 million. Pence also worked for Marathon Oil and Unocal. In 1999, he was elected to the board of directors of Home Federal Bancorp and its subsidiary Home Federal Savings Bank.

== U.S. House of Representatives (2019–2025) ==
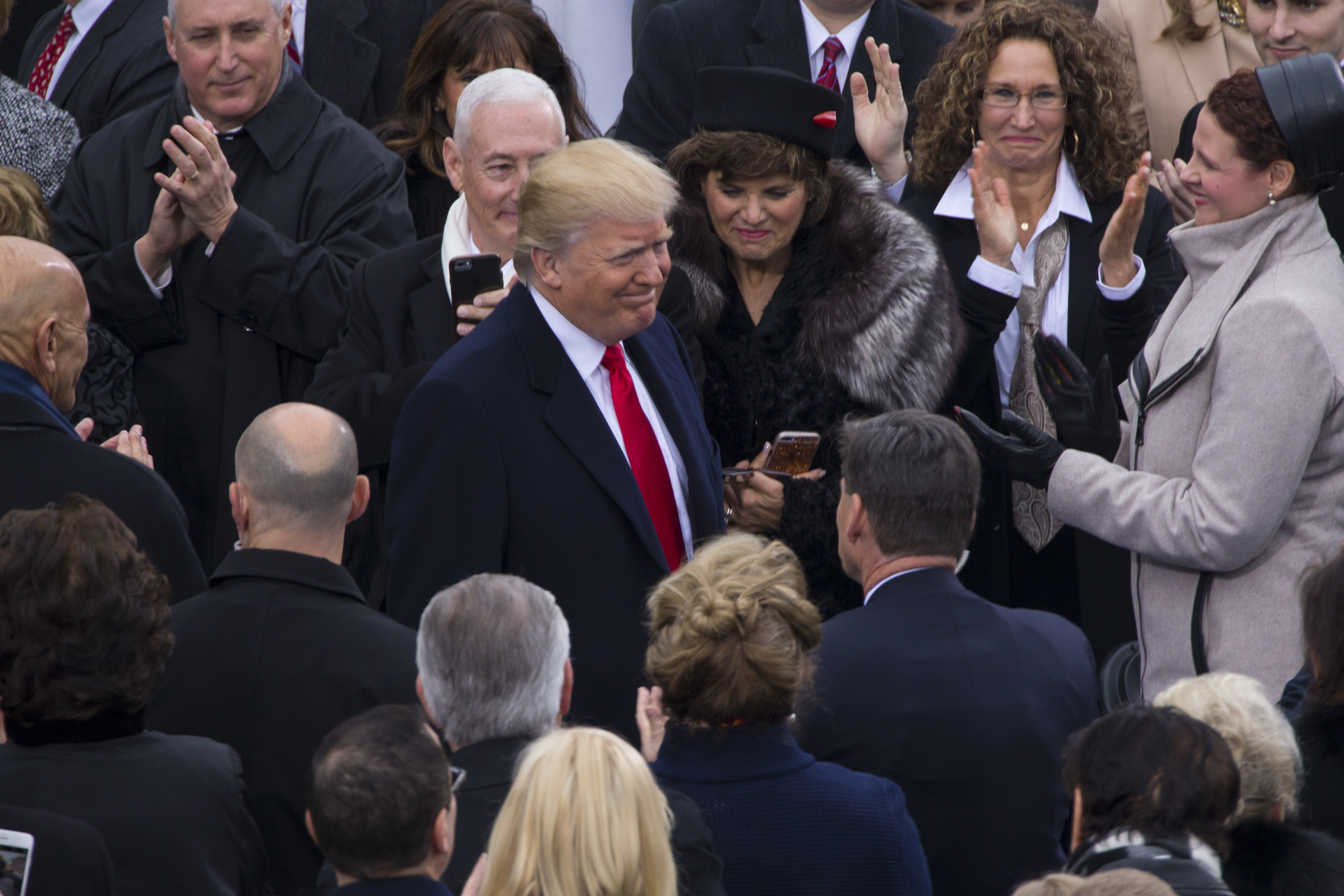
Pence standing behind Donald Trump at the 2017 inauguration

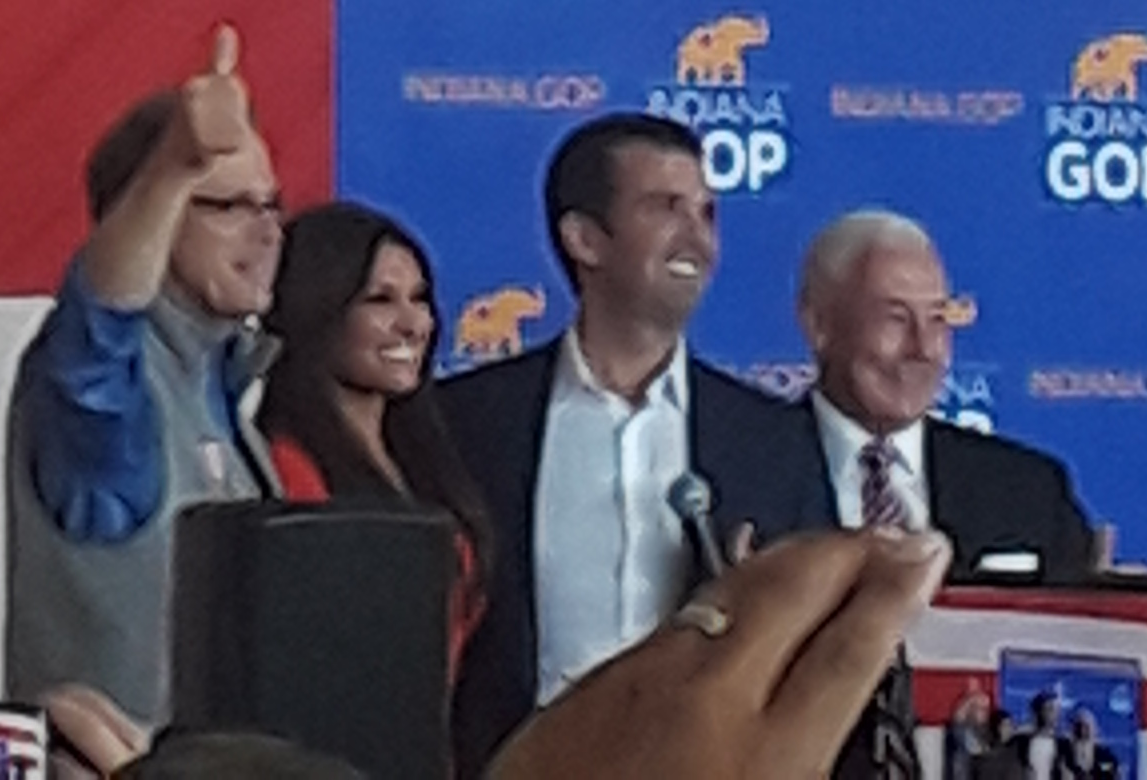
Pence with Mike Braun, Donald Trump Jr., and Kimberly Guilfoyle in 2018

=== Elections ===
==== 2018 ====
Pence was the finance chairman in U.S. Representative Luke Messer's 2018 campaign for the U.S. Senate. In October 2017, Pence launched his own campaign for the position Messer was leaving. On May 8, 2018, Pence won the Republican nomination for the U.S. House seat his brother Mike had held for 12 years. With Pence raising and spending about $1 million as of mid-April and his closest Republican challenger loaning himself about three quarters of that amount, it made the "race the most expensive in the state." Pence faced Democrat Jeannine Lake in the November general election and won by a margin of over 30%.

==== 2020 ====
Pence defeated Lake in a rematch in the November 3 general election with 68.6% of the vote.

=== Tenure ===
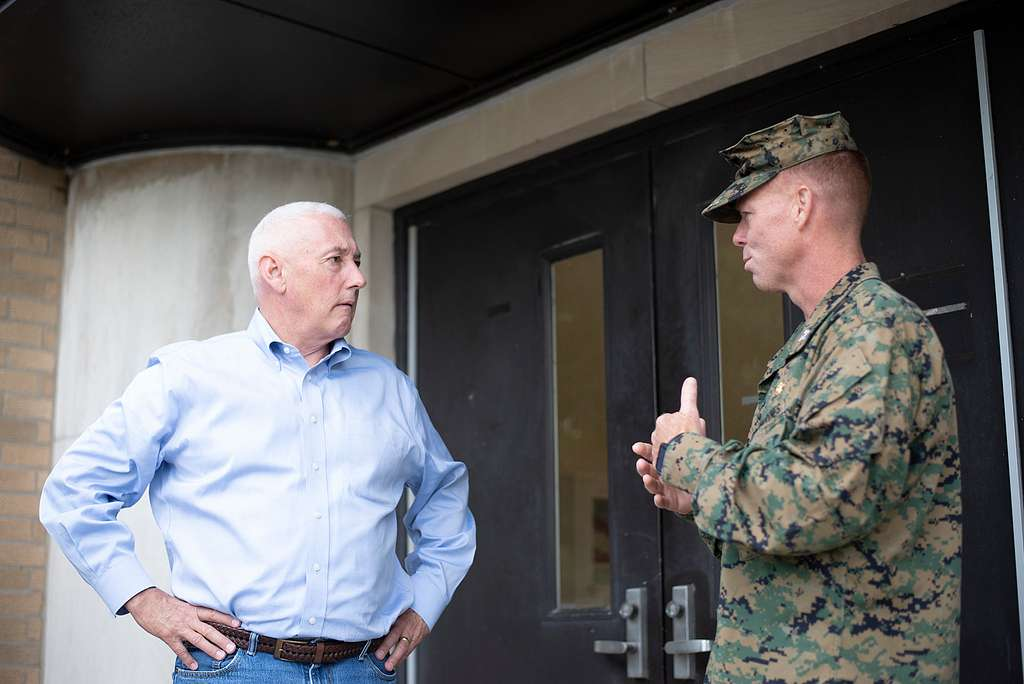
Pence speaks with a military officer during his term

In January 2021 in the aftermath of the insurrection at the Capitol and despite the rioters threatening to hang Mike Pence, Greg Pence voted to side with Trump and reject the Pennsylvania votes which swung the election to Biden.

In May 2021, Pence voted against a House bill establishing a January 6 commission, accusing Speaker Nancy Pelosi and Democrats of partisan plans to use the commission to carry out the "political execution of Donald Trump". The bill passed.

In August 2022, Pence criticized President Joe Biden for forgiving up to $10,000 of student loan debt for eligible borrowers. Pence was criticized for hypocrisy because he had $79,441 of debt from his PPP loan forgiven.

=== Committee assignments ===
For the 118th Congress:

- Committee on Energy and Commerce
  - Subcommittee on Energy, Climate, and Grid Security
  - Subcommittee on Environment, Manufacturing, and Critical Materials
  - Subcommittee on Health

== Electoral history ==
Republican primary results, 2018
Party	Candidate	Votes	%
Republican	Greg Pence	47,955	65.3
Republican	Jonathan Lamb	17,523	23.9
Republican	Mike Campbell	3,229	4.4
Republican	Stephen MacKenzie	2,500	3.4
Republican	Jeff Smith	2,258	3.1
Total votes		73,465	100.0

Indiana's 6th congressional district, 2018
Party	Candidate	Votes	%
Republican	Greg Pence	154,260	63.8
Democratic	Jeannine Lee Lake	79,430	32.9
Libertarian	Tom Ferkinhoff	8,030	3.3
Independent	John Miller (write-in)	5	0.0
Independent	Heather Leigh Meloy (write-in)	1	0.0
Total votes		241,726	100.0
Republican hold			

Republican primary results, 2020
Party	Candidate	Votes	%
Republican	Greg Pence (incumbent)	62,346	83.6
Republican	Mike Campbell	12,234	16.4
Total votes		74,580	100.0

Indiana's 6th congressional district, 2020
Party	Candidate	Votes	%
Republican	Greg Pence (incumbent)	225,318	68.6
Democratic	Jeannine Lee Lake	91,103	27.8
Libertarian	Tom Ferkinhoff	11,791	3.6
Total votes		328,212	100.0
Republican hold			

Republican primary results, 2022
Party	Candidate	Votes	%
Republican	Greg Pence (incumbent)	44,893	77.6
Republican	James Alspach	12,923	22.4
Total votes		57,816	100.0

Indiana's 6th congressional district, 2022
Party	Candidate	Votes	%
Republican	Greg Pence (incumbent)	130,686	67.5
Democratic	Cinde Wirth	62,838	32.5
Total votes		193,524	100.0
Republican hold			

== Personal life ==
Pence and his wife, Denise, own two antique malls. They have four children and ten grandchildren. Pence is a practicing Catholic and attends St. Bartholomew Catholic Church in Columbus.

Denise Pence was an Indiana delegate at the 2016 Republican National Convention and 2020 Republican National Convention and cast her vote for Donald Trump and Mike Pence to be the party's nominees. She was also a delegate at the 2024 Republican National Convention, where she cast her vote for Trump and JD Vance to be the nominees. Pence and his family were in attendance at Trump's inauguration, seated several rows behind him.

Their oldest daughter, Nicole, was a TV anchor in Indianapolis and their son, John, worked on Trump's 2020 campaign as a senior advisor and is married to Kellyanne Conway's cousin Giovanna Coia.

U.S. House of Representatives
Preceded by Luke Messer	Member of the U.S. House of Representatives from Indiana's 6th congressional district 2019–2025	Succeeded by Jefferson Shreve
U.S. order of precedence (ceremonial)
Preceded by Trey Hollingsworth as Former U.S. Representative	Order of precedence of the United States as Former U.S. Representative	Succeeded by Tom Corcoran as Former U.S. Representative
