= Charles Gardner Geyh =

American law professor

Charles Gardner Geyh is the John F. Kimberling Professor of Law at the Indiana University Maurer School of Law in Bloomington, Indiana. His research centers on judicial conduct, ethics, procedure, independence, and administration, and he has testified as an expert in several cases involving judicial impeachment. In addition, he is quoted frequently in the national media for his expertise in judicial misconduct, conflicts of interest, and the separation of powers.

Geyh graduated from the University of Wisconsin in 1980, and from its law school in 1983. He clerked for Hon. Thomas A. Clark on the U.S. Court of Appeals for the Eleventh Circuit before joining Covington & Burling in Washington, D.C., in 1984. He began his teaching career in 1991 and joined the Maurer School of Law faculty in 1999. In 2016, he was selected as an Andrew Carnegie Fellow, one of only 33 chosen nationally.

== Selected works ==
- Lies, Damn Lies, and the Judicial Selection Debate: How America Picks Its Judges and Judges its Picks (forthcoming, Oxford University Press 2018).
- Legal Ethics, Professional Responsibility, and the Legal Profession (with Gregory Sisk, William Henderson, Katherine Cruse, Susan Fortney, Neil Hamilton, Vincent Johnson, Stephen Pepper, Melissa Weresh, (forthcoming, West Academic Publishing 2018).
- Courting Peril: The Political Transformation of the American Judiciary (Oxford University Press 2016).
- Understanding Civil Procedure (with Gene Shreve & Peter Raven-Hansen) (Lexis Law Publishing, 5th ed. 2013).
- Judicial Conduct and Ethics (with James Alfini, Steven Lubet & Jeffrey Shaman) (Lexis Law Publishing, 5th ed. 2013).
- What's Law Got to Do With It?: What Judges Do, Why They Do It, and What's at Stake (Charles Gardner Geyh, ed., Stanford University Press 2011).
- Disqualification: An Analysis of Federal Law (Federal Judicial Center 2d ed., 2011).
- When Courts and Congress Collide: The Struggle for Control of America's Judicial System (University of Michigan Press paperback edition 2008.
