= Fred Cate =

American professor (born 1963)

Fred Harrison Cate (born 1963 in McRae, Georgia) is a distinguished professor and the C. Ben Dutton Professor of Law at Indiana University Maurer School of Law. From 2015 to 2023, he served as Indiana University's Vice President for Research. He served as founding director and is now a senior fellow of the Center for Applied Cybersecurity Research. Cate specializes in information privacy and security law issues. He has testified before numerous congressional committees and speaks frequently before professional, industry, and government groups.

He is a senior policy advisor to Red Barn Strategy and chair of the Ethics, Legal, and Social Issues board of Wellcome Leap. He served as a member of member of the National Academy of Sciences Forum on Cyber Resilience, Microsoft's Trustworthy Computing Academic Advisory Board, Intel's Privacy and Security External Advisory Board, the Department of Homeland Security's Data Privacy and Integrity Committee Cybersecurity Subcommittee, the Department of Defense Advanced Research Projects Agency Privacy Oversight Board, the board of directors of The Privacy Projects, the board of directors of the International Foundation for Online Responsibility, and the board of directors of the Kinsey Institute for Research in Sex, Gender and Reproduction.

Cate chaired the National Academy of Sciences Committee on Law Enforcement and Intelligence Access to Plaintext Information in an Era of Widespread Strong Encryption and served as a member of the Committee on Technical and Privacy Dimensions of Information for Terrorism Prevention. He served as counsel to the Department of Defense Technology and Privacy Advisory Committee, reporter for the third report of the Markle Task Force on National Security in the Information Age, and a member of the Federal Trade Commission's Advisory Committee on Online Access and Security. He chaired the International Telecommunication Union's High-Level Experts on Electronic Signatures and Certification Authorities.

He served as the privacy editor for the Institute of Electrical and Electronics Engineers' Security & Privacy and is one of the founding editors of the Oxford University Press journal, International Data Privacy Law. He is the author of more than 150 books and articles, including The Internet and the First Amendment, Privacy in the Information Age, and Privacy in Perspective, and he appears frequently in the popular press.

In October 2017, the Oxford University Press published "Bulk Collection: Systematic Government Access to Private-Sector Data," which was edited and compiled by Cate and Jim Dempsey, executive director of the Berkeley Center for Law & Technology at the University of California, Berkeley, School of Law.

Professor Cate attended Oxford University and received his J.D. (1987) and his A.B. (1984) with Honors and Distinction from Stanford University. He served as a Senator, Fellow, and President of the Phi Beta Kappa Society, and he is an elected member of the Council on Foreign Relations and the American Law Institute, a fellow of the American Bar Foundation.
