= Indiana University Maurer School of Law =

Law school in Bloomington, Indiana, U.S.

Coordinates: 39°09′54.3″N 86°31′35.4″W

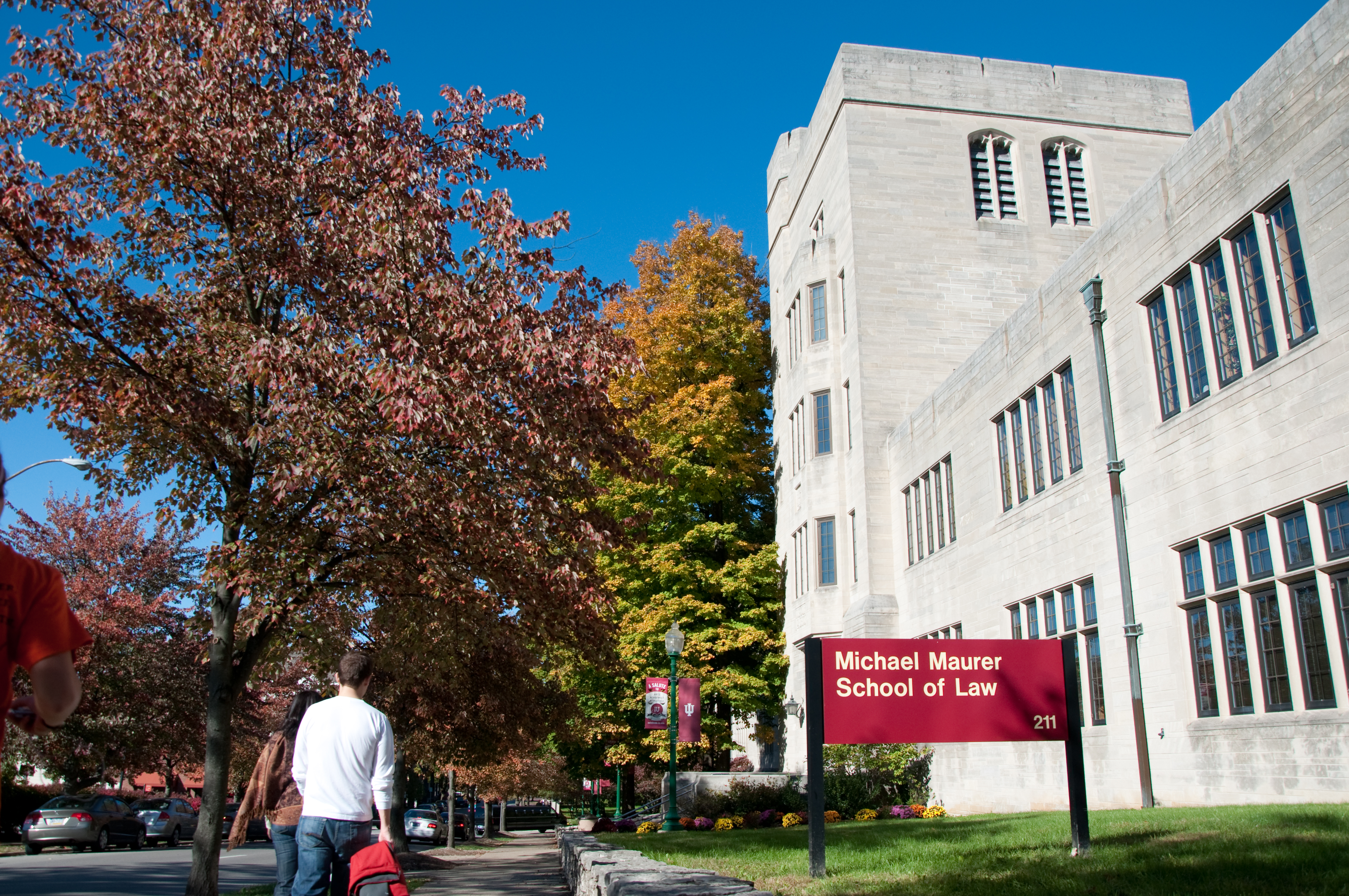
- Lowell E. Baier Hall
- Established: 1842; 184 years ago
- School type: Public law school
- Dean: Christiana Ochoa
- Location: Bloomington, Indiana, United States
- Enrollment: 530 (fall 2023)
- Faculty: 125 (fall 2022)
- USNWR ranking: 49th (tie) (2026)
- Bar pass rate: 82.46% (2022; first-time takers)
- Website: www.law.indiana.edu

The Indiana University Maurer School of Law is the law school of Indiana University Bloomington, a public research university in Bloomington, Indiana, United States. Established in 1842, the school is named after alumnus Michael S. "Mickey" Maurer, an Indianapolis businessman who donated $35 million to the school in 2008.

The law school is one of two law schools operated by Indiana University, the other being the Indiana University Robert H. McKinney School of Law (IU McKinney) in Indianapolis. Although both law schools are part of Indiana University, each law school is wholly independent of the other.

== History ==
Founded in 1842, the Indiana University Maurer School of Law is one of the oldest law schools in the United States. The school is located on the southwest corner of the Indiana University Bloomington campus, which puts it in the center of Bloomington. The school maintains significant alumni bases in Indianapolis, Chicago, Washington D.C., and New York.

Since its founding, the law school has produced many notable alumni, including an Associate Justice of the Supreme Court, the current Chief Justice of Indiana, numerous state supreme court justices, and federal appellate and district court judges. The school's library, named for the American legal scholar and Indiana University law professor Jerome Hall, is one of the largest academic law libraries in the United States with more than 450,000 volumes.

== Admissions ==
For the class entering in 2023, the Indiana University Maurer School of Law accepted 46.86% of applicants, with 22.08% of those accepted enrolling. The average enrollee had a 164 LSAT score and 3.86 undergraduate GPA.

== Academics ==
The Juris Doctor (JD) degree is offered, along with 11 joint and dual degrees, including a JD/MBA with the Kelley School of Business and a JD/MPA with the O'Neill School of Public and Environmental Affairs. A master's in cybersecurity law and policy is also available in partnership with the Kelley School and the Luddy School of Informatics, Computing, and Engineering. The school also partners with various schools around the world to offer exchange programs. Graduate degrees are also offered: LLM with or without thesis, SJD, MCL, and a PhD in law and democracy. The LLM course of study provides six areas of specialization.

The Maurer School of Law offers various experiential education opportunities, including five clinics (community law, conservation, entrepreneurship, intellectual property, and mediation); externships both in the US and abroad, and noncredit pro bono advocacy projects. Students are asked to commit 60 hours of pro bono service during their three years of law school.

Students compete in several competitions, including Sherman Minton Moot Court Competition, Jessup International Moot Court Competition, Trial Practice Competition, and Negotiations Competition. IU Maurer has more than 30 student organizations, including Intellectual Property Association, International Law Society, and Public Interest Law Foundation. Local chapters of national organizations include the American Constitution Society, Federalist Society for Law and Public Studies, and American Bar Association Law Student Division.

== Publications ==
- Indiana Law Journal
- Indiana Journal of Constitutional Design
- Indiana Journal of Global Legal Studies
- Indiana Journal of Law and Social Equality
- IP Theory

== Legal centers ==
Center for Constitutional Democracy (CCD) seeks to study and promote constitutional democracy in countries marked by ethnic, religious, linguistic, and other divisions. Founded and directed by John S. Hastings Professor of Law David Williams, the CCD focuses its work in Burma, Liberia, South Sudan, and Libya, training the reform leaders of these countries in constitutionalism, parliamentary process, and legal ordering. The Center focuses its efforts on the constitutional aspects of democratic reform, enabling plural societies to peaceably provide meaningful self-governance to all their citizens. The CCD is the only educational institution in the United States that offers students the chance to work directly and regularly with foreign reform leaders to support constitutional democracy.

Center for Intellectual Property Research supports study in all aspects of intellectual property law and allied fields including patent, trademark, unfair competition, copyright and information policy.

Center for Law, Society, and Culture The fundamental mission of the Center for Law, Society & Culture is to promote and disseminate a multidisciplinary understanding of law through scholarship, teaching, and discussion. The center produces, presents, and coordinates research conducted by exceptional scholars in schools and departments across Indiana University on the subject of law and legal problems. The center supports research related to the law in a broad sense, including cultural aspects of law expressed through political theory and the humanities, and scientific aspects of law expressed through technological advance in biotechnology, environmental science, and information technology.

Milt and Judi Stewart Center on the Global Legal Profession Forces of globalization, politics and the economy create enormous challenges and opportunities for lawyers, clients, policymakers, law schools and the public. The Center on the Global Legal Profession focuses on the role of lawyers in society, the business of lawyering, and the organizational context housing legal practice. The center's faculty and fellows examine these issues through the lens of empirical research, using original and existing data and utilizing both quantitative and qualitative methodology. The Milton Stewart Fellows are selected in a competitive process each year for internships in India, South Korea, and Brazil under the direction of the center.

== Employment ==
According to the school's ABA-required disclosures, 83.5% of the Class of 2019 had obtained full-time, long-term, JD-required employment 10 months after graduation.

== Costs ==
The total cost of attendance (including tuition, fees, and living expenses) at the Maurer School of Law for the 2020–2021 academic year is $50,331 for an in-state resident, and $71,006 for a non-Indiana resident. Most students receive some form of financial aid.

== Rankings and reputation ==
In its 2026 rankings, U.S. News & World Report ranked the IU Maurer School of Law 49th among the nation's 197 law schools.

== Faculty ==
Notable current Maurer School of Law faculty include Hannah L. Buxbaum, Fred Cate, Robert L. Fischman, Charles Gardner Geyh, Joseph L. Hoffmann, Donna M. Nagy, and Susan Hoffman Williams, among others. In addition to the current faculty, the law school's faculty has been honored by the teaching and scholarship of distinguished professors throughout its history. Some of them are:

- Morris S. Arnold, senior-status judge for the U.S. Court of Appeals for the Eighth Circuit; served briefly as dean in the 1980s
- Julius Getman, nationally known scholar in labor and employment law
- James Hughes, law professor in the 1850s; judge, U.S. Court of Claims
- Paul McNutt, youngest dean in the law school's history; governor of Indiana during the Great Depression; High Commissioner to the Philippines
- Richard M. Milburn, served as Indiana Attorney General after teaching law for twelve years at IU
- S. Jay Plager, dean from 1977 to 1984; secured funding for faculty growth and building expansion; currently Senior Circuit Judge, U.S. Court of Appeals for the Federal Circuit
