= Trey Hollingsworth =

American businessman and politician (born 1983)

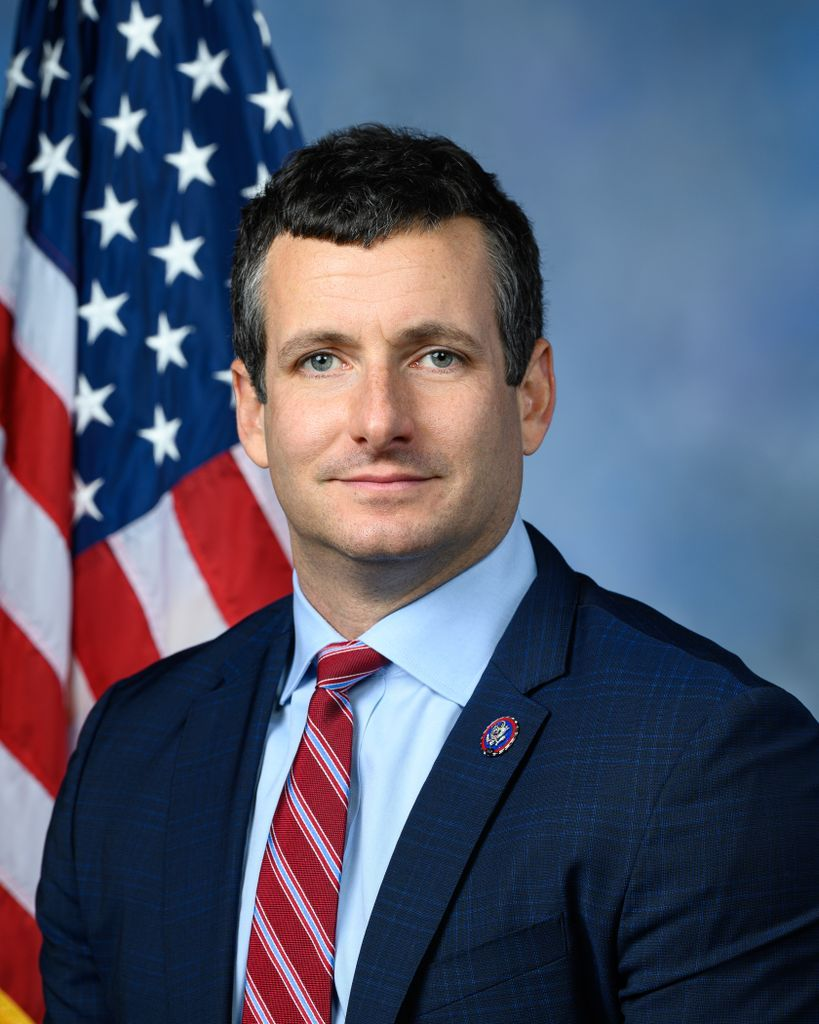

Member of the U.S. House of Representatives from Indiana's 9th district
- In office January 3, 2017 – January 3, 2023
- Preceded by: Todd Young
- Succeeded by: Erin Houchin

Personal details
- Born: Joseph Albert Hollingsworth III; September 12, 1983 (age 43) Clinton, Tennessee, U.S.
- Party: Republican
- Spouse: Kelly Francis (m. 2014)
- Children: 1
- Education: University of Pennsylvania (BS); Georgetown University (MPP)

Joseph Albert "Trey" Hollingsworth III (born September 12, 1983) is an American businessman and politician who served as the U.S. representative for Indiana's 9th congressional district from 2017 to 2023. A member of the Republican Party, Hollingsworth served on the House of Representatives Financial Services Committee. Hollingsworth was the vice ranking member of the House Financial Services Committee Subcommittee on Investor Protection, Entrepreneurship, and Capital Markets and a member of the House Financial Services Subcommittee on Diversity and Inclusion.

On January 12, 2022, Hollingsworth announced he would not run for re-election in 2022.

== Early life and education ==
Hollingsworth was born in Clinton, Tennessee. He attended the Webb School in Knoxville, Tennessee, and the University of Pennsylvania, graduating from the Wharton School as one of its youngest . After graduating from Wharton, Hollingsworth founded Hollingsworth Capital Partners with his father, Joe Hollingsworth Jr. The company was ranked #12 on the Inc 500 list of fastest growing companies in 2008; it specialized in rebuilding old manufacturing sites and returning them to service. The firm generated over $32 million in revenue in 2007 and owned 27 distribution centers in 22 states. He also founded an aluminum remanufacturing company, which was reported to have produced approximately 1.8 billion pounds of aluminum before it was sold.

Hollingsworth lives in Jeffersonville, Indiana.

== U.S. House of Representatives ==
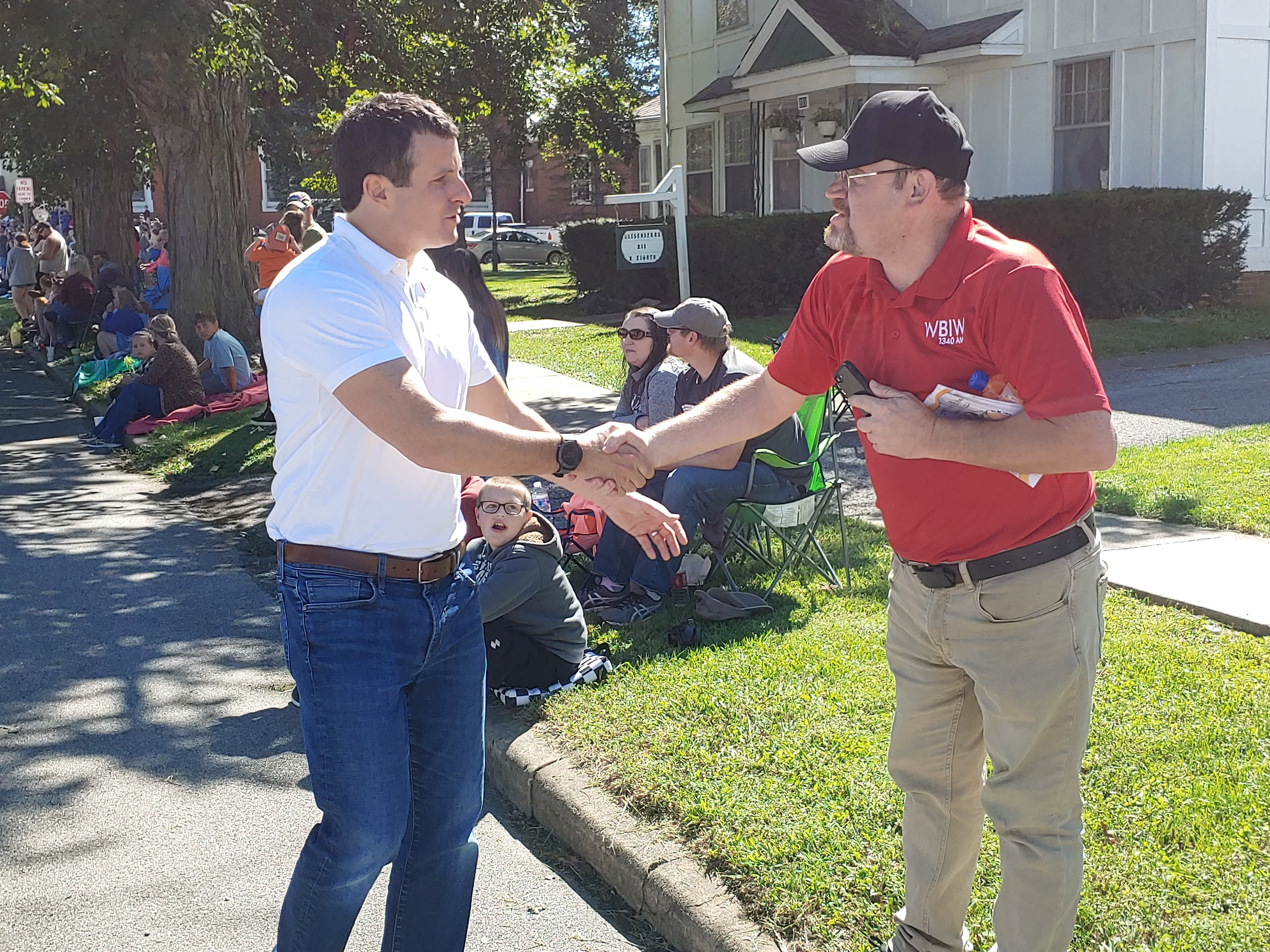
Hollingsworth campaigning

=== Elections ===
==== 2016 campaign ====
Hollingsworth declared his candidacy for the United States House of Representatives in Indiana's 9th Congressional District in October 2015. Running in the Republican Party primary election against Indiana Attorney General Greg Zoeller and State Senators Erin Houchin and Brent Waltz, Hollingsworth won with 34% of the vote. He defeated Democratic nominee Shelli Yoder in the November general election with 54% of the vote.

==== 2018 campaign ====
Hollingsworth defeated Democratic nominee Liz Watson in 2018, 59% to 41%. Watson was endorsed by Elizabeth Warren.

==== 2020 campaign ====
Hollingsworth won his third term representing Indiana's 9th Congressional District in 2020 against challengers Andy Ruff, a Democrat, and Libertarian Tonya Millis, with over 61% of the vote.

"I’m honored to serve a third term in the U.S. House of Representatives, working alongside Hoosiers every day to fight for certainty and prosperity during these uncertain times", Hollingsworth wrote in a news release. "Since you first elected me, we have worked together to make sure our voices are heard in Washington, to support policies that put American families first, and to expand opportunities for Hoosiers to succeed. Now is not the time to back down from the fight for our values, and I look forward to working together for another two years."

=== Tenure ===
Hollingsworth was sworn into his first term on January 3, 2017, his second term on January 3, 2019, and his third term on January 3, 2021. He has promised to serve no more than eight years (four terms) in the House.

Government reform, including creating Congressional term limits, has been a priority of Hollingsworth's. In the 115th, 116th, and 117th Congresses, his first bill introduced was a resolution to amend the Constitution to impose term limits on Congressional lawmakers. The measure would limit Congressional terms to four in the House of Representatives and two in the Senate.

As a member of the House Financial Services Committee, Hollingsworth was active in efforts to regulate the financial services industry. Among other actions, Hollingsworth led an inquiry to the Federal Reserve to remove regulations that hindered the ability of retail investors to use margin to invest in some stocks. He also introduced a bill to prevent two government-sponsored enterprises, Fannie Mae and Freddie Mac, from lobbying the government while they are simultaneously owned by the government. He also pushed the Federal Insurance Office to support state-level regulation of auto insurance. Hollingsworth introduced the Stablecoin Transparency Act, following an investigation into Tether's reserves, in attempt to improve consumer information about "stablecoins."

Hollingsworth has also attempted to implement a lobbying ban for members of Congress in support of his government reform program. In the 115th, 116th, and 117th Congresses, he introduced the Banning Lobbying and Safeguarding Trust Act, which would ban members of Congress from ever registering as lobbyists, in order to ensure politicians vote for their "constituents rather than clients". Also in connection with government reform, Hollingsworth has voted against all short-term spending bills and believes short-term budgeting is a failure of process and waste of taxpayer dollars.

=== Committee assignment ===
- Committee on Financial Services
  - Subcommittee on Investor Protection, Entrepreneurship, and Capital Markets
  - Subcommittee on Housing, Community Development, and Insurance

Hollingsworth served on the House Financial Services Committee since taking office in 2017 and was active in financial services policy.

==== Capital markets ====
===== 116th United States Congress =====
In 2019, Hollingsworth introduced the Senior Security Act, which aims to protect senior citizen investors from financial fraud and abuse. Also in 2019, he introduced a bipartisan bill, the Fannie Mae and Freddie Mac Lobbying Regulation Act, to ban government-sponsored enterprises officials, including Fannie Mae and Freddie Mac, from lobbying members of Congress.

==== Finance, fintech, and digital assets ====
In 2022, Hollingsworth and Josh Gottheimer led a bipartisan letter to the United States Department of the Treasury asking for more information about Tether's exposure to foreign assets. In 2019, Hollingsworth and Emanuel Cleaver led a bipartisan letter to FinCEN asking its director to investigate using artificial intelligence and machine learning to more efficiently detect and deter financial crimes, such as fraud, in cooperation with banks.

=== Political positions ===
==== Agriculture ====
Hollingsworth introduced the Livestock Protection Act to protect farmer's livestock from predatory black vultures after local farmers brought the issue to his attention during a town hall. In the 115th Congress, Hollingsworth voted for the 2018 Farm Bill to fund and update the Department of Agriculture.

==== Jobs and the economy ====
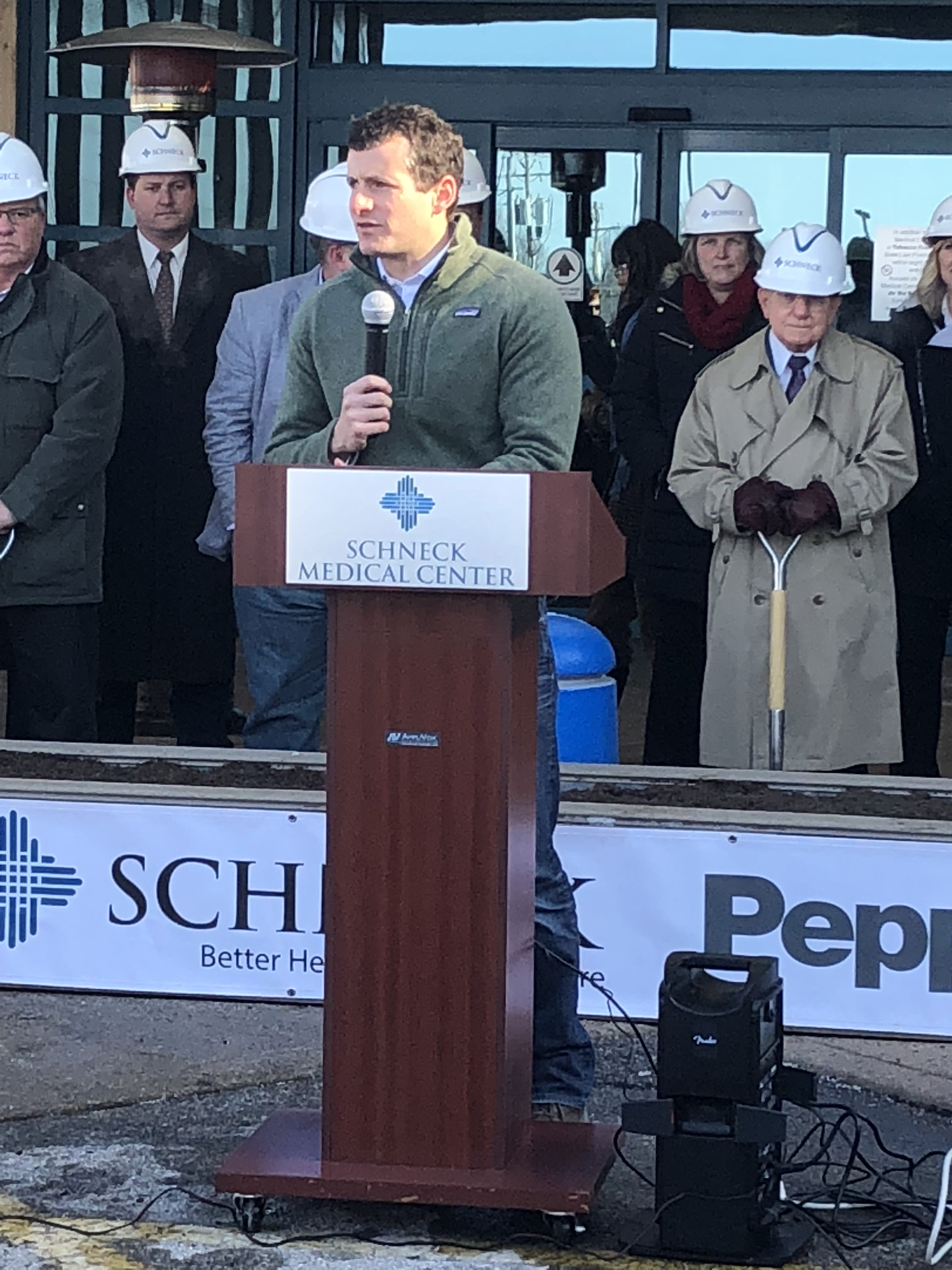
Hollingsworth speaks at a hospital groundbreaking

In 2019, Hollingsworth had a cumulative score of 84% from the U.S. Chamber of Commerce based on votes on "critical business legislation" as defined by the Chamber. To address workforce challenges faced by Indiana businesses, Hollingsworth supported the Carl Perkins Career and Technical Education Act, to help young people develop the skills needed for high-wage jobs in fields like agriculture, manufacturing, public safety, business, and information technology.

In the 115th, 116th, and 117th Congresses, Hollingsworth introduced the Developing Responsible Individuals for a Vibrant Economy (DRIVE-Safe) Act after. The DRIVE-Safe Act provides a safety and training program that enables 18 to 21-year-old CDL holders to drive across state lines.

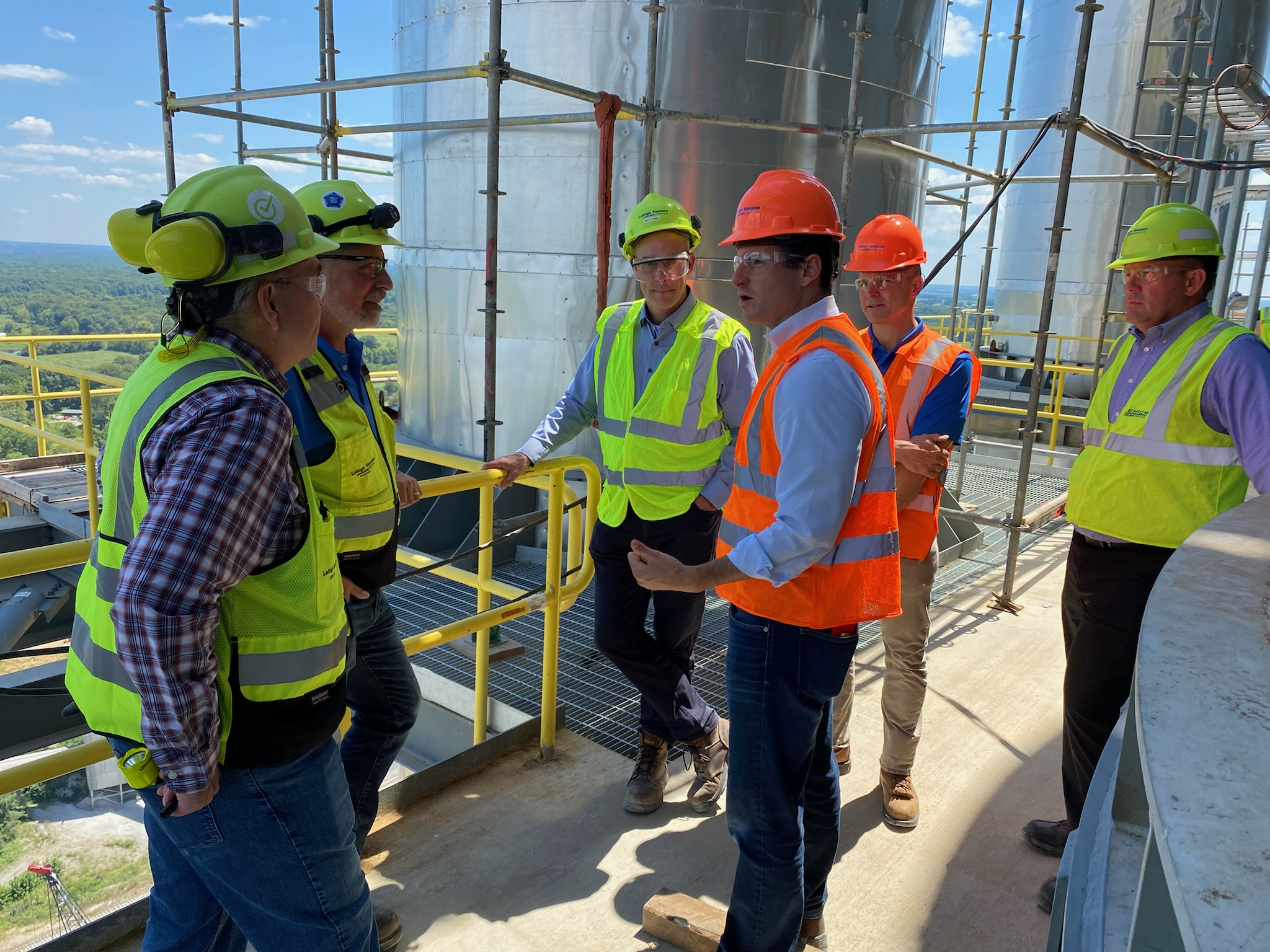
Hollingsworth tours a facility under construction in his district

In 2022, Hollingsworth campaigned against CFPB rules that would impose compliance costs on small businesses and compromise individual privacy, as well as CFPB rules that would reduce access to consumer lending.

==== Housing ====
To increase access to rural housing, Hollingsworth introduced the Yes in My Backyard Act. The purpose of the Yes in My Backyard Act is to encourage local governments to take measures to reduce barriers to affordable housing. Hollingsworth met with the National Manufacturing Housing Association in Indianapolis to discuss the affordable housing crisis.

==== Government reform ====
Hollingsworth has advocated for Congressional term limits and has promised to serve no more than eight years (four terms) in the House. In the 115th, 116th, and 117th Congresses, the first bill he introduced was a resolution to amend the Constitution to impose term limits on Congressional lawmakers. The measure would limit Congressional terms to four in the House and two in the Senate.

Hollingsworth has also proposed a lobbying ban for members of Congress. He has introduced the Banning Lobbying and Safeguarding Trust Act, which would ban members of Congress from ever registering as a lobbyist.

==== COVID-19 pandemic ====
In April 2020, during the COVID-19 pandemic, Hollingsworth said he favored ending stay-at-home orders so as to reopen the economy. "The social scientists are telling us about the economic disaster that is going on", he said. "Our GDP is supposed to be down 20% alone this quarter. It is policymakers' decision to put on our big boy and big girl pants and say [more deaths] is the lesser of these two evils. It is not zero evil, but it is the lesser of these two evils and we intend to move forward that direction. That is our responsibility and to abdicate that is to insult the Americans that voted us into office." A statement provided by his office later that day said, "It's hyperbolic to say that the only choices before us are the two corner solutions: no economy or widespread casualties. We can use the best of biology and economics to enable as much of the economy to operate as possible while we work to minimize disease transmission."

==== Health care ====
At a campaign event, Hollingsworth said he would not support legislation in the House of Representatives to switch America to a single-payer health insurance system. Hollingsworth stated he believes the focus of healthcare should be on delivering more options, more competition and putting the patient at the center of this instead of a "government bureaucrat."

Hollingsworth supports the repeal and replacement of the Affordable Care Act (Obamacare). He considers the act government overreach that impedes innovation by health care companies.

==== Veterans ====
In the 116th and 117th Congresses, Hollingsworth introduced the Investing in Veteran Entrepreneurial Talents (VETs) Act to support service-disabled veteran-owned small businesses. He drafted the act in consultation with service-disabled veterans. Hollingsworth first introduced the act in November 2020. The original version included a certification protocol modification that was adopted in the 2021 National Defense Authorization Act, which Hollingsworth supported.

==== Law enforcement ====
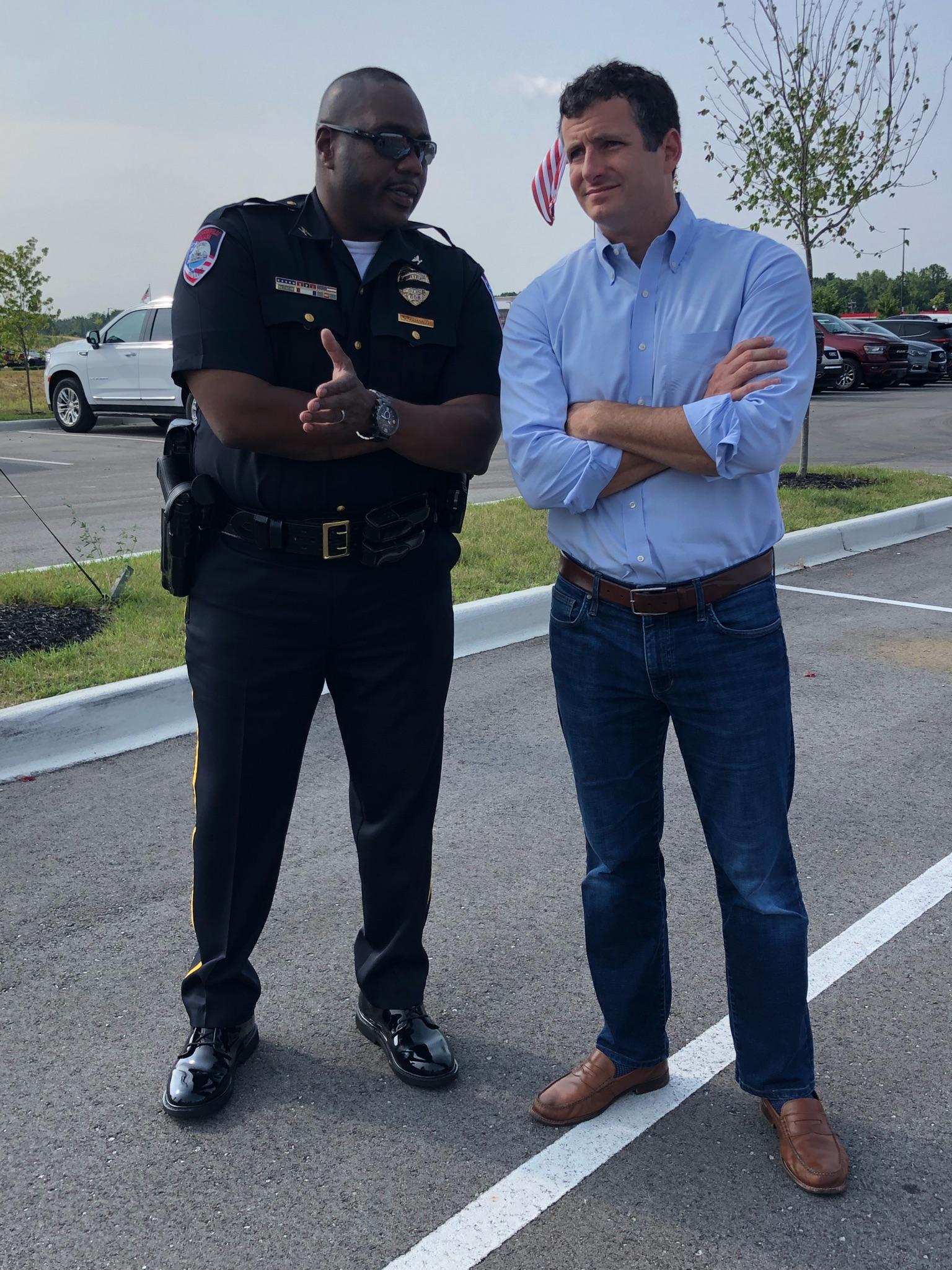
Hollingsworth speaks with Police Chief Kenny Kavanaugh of Jeffersonville, Indiana

Hollingsworth is a staunch supporter of law enforcement officers. He authored the Protecting Officers of the Law In Civilian Establishments (POLICE) Act to allow federal law enforcement officers to enter federal property armed. This bill stemmed from a call with Floyd County, Indiana Sheriff Frank Loop, who shared his officers' stories with Hollingsworth.

=== International issues ===
==== Trade ====
Hollingsworth requested that the U.S. Department of Commerce lift its Section 232 restrictions on POSCO Steel, a Korean steel company with a facility in Jeffersonville, Indiana.

=== Social issues ===
==== Abortion ====
Hollingsworth has a staunch anti-abortion voting record. He has repeatedly voted against taxpayer-funded abortion and has repeatedly co-sponsored the Pain-Capable Unborn Child Protection Act, Born-Alive Abortion Survivors Protections Act, and other pieces of related legislation.

==== Transgender rights ====
Hollingsworth voted to disapprove of President Trump's policy to ban transgender people from openly serving in the military, saying, "the honor of serving our country and protecting American freedoms should be open to anyone who can pass the physical, psychological, and medical exams."

== Electoral history ==
Indiana's 9th congressional district election, 2016
Party	Candidate	Votes	%	±%
Republican	Trey Hollingsworth	174,791	54.1%	
Democratic	Shelli Yoder	130,627	40.5%	
Libertarian	Russell Brooksbank	17,425	5.4%	
Turnout		322,843		

Indiana's 9th congressional district election, 2018
Party	Candidate	Votes	%	±%
Republican	Trey Hollingsworth (incumbent)	153,271	56.5%	
Democratic	Liz Watson	118,090	43.5%	
Turnout		271,361		

Indiana's 9th congressional district, 2020
Party	Candidate	Votes	%	±%
Republican	Trey Hollingsworth (incumbent)	222,057	61.8%	
Democratic	Andy Ruff	122,566	34.1%	
Libertarian	Tonya Lynn Millis	14,415	4.0%	
Turnout		359,038		

== Personal life ==
Hollingsworth married Kelly Francis, daughter of Pat Francis of Pat's Steak House and a Louisville native, in 2014, in a ceremony in Charleston, South Carolina. Guests were asked to donate to the Charleston Miracle League, a charity providing sports-related activities to disabled adults and children, in lieu of gifts. They have a son, Joseph, born in 2017. They reside in Jeffersonville, Indiana, a few miles from where Kelly was born and raised and her family still resides.

Hollingsworth is a Protestant.

U.S. House of Representatives
Preceded by Todd Young	Member of the U.S. House of Representatives from Indiana's 9th congressional district 2017–2023	Succeeded by Erin Houchin
U.S. order of precedence (ceremonial)
Preceded by Luke Messer as Former U.S. Representative	Order of precedence of the United States as Former U.S. Representative	Succeeded by Greg Pence as Former U.S. Representative
