= Lowell E. Baier =

American historian (1940–2025)

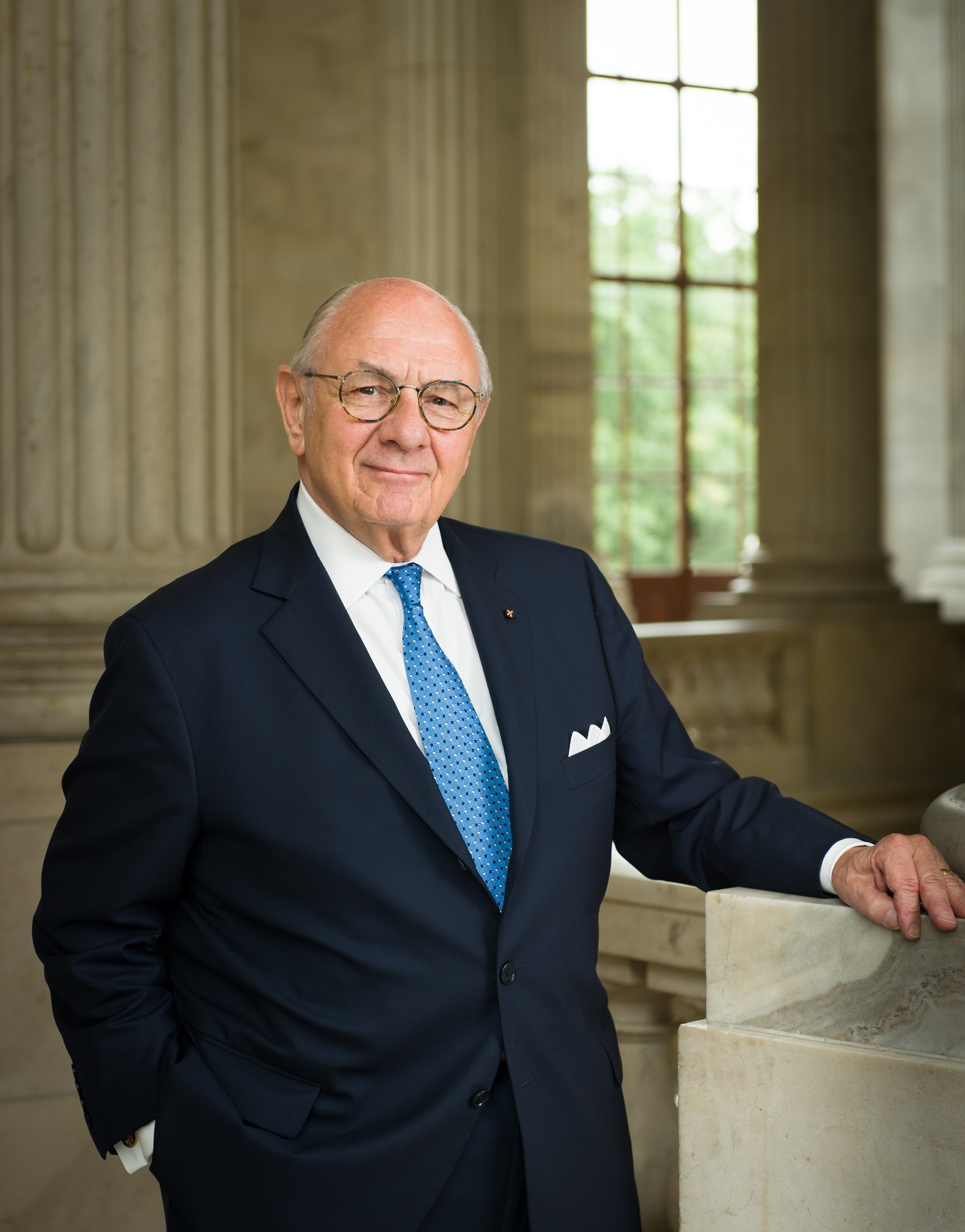
- Born: Lowell Edward Baier; January 6, 1940; Chicago, Illinois, U.S.
- Died: November 21, 2025 (aged 85)
- Education: Valparaiso University (BA); Indiana University School of Law (JD)
- Occupations: Attorney; Legal and environmental historian and author; Entrepreneur
- Website: https://lowellebaier.com/

Lowell Edward Baier (January 6, 1940 – November 21, 2025) was an American attorney, businessman and an environmental historian and author. He dedicated his life to natural resources and wildlife conservation. Throughout his career he was an advisor to many elected officials and educators, including every successive presidential administration since George H. W. Bush, and was an active and instrumental member of several national conservation groups.

== Early life and education ==
Lowell E. Baier was born in Chicago, Illinois, on January 6, 1940. He grew up on a farm outside the small town of Remington, Indiana. He was a member of the Boy Scouts of America. He became an Eagle Scout in 1954, at the age of 14. In 1956, his congressman Charles A. Halleck (R-2nd IN) appointed him to be his Page Boy in the United States House of Representatives, because he was the first Boy Scout to achieve the rank of Eagle Scout in Jasper County, Indiana. He developed a passion for wildlife and natural resource conservation early in life that greatly influenced his career.

Baier received his B.A. in economics and political science from Valparaiso University in 1961. He went on to attend law school at Indiana University School of Law in Bloomington, Indiana, where he received his J.D. in 1964.

He served in the U.S. Army Reserves from 1956 to 1964.

== Career ==
Baier's intellectual curiosity during his long career took him from a practicing attorney to an entrepreneur, to a tireless advocate for natural resources and wildlife conservation, to a legal and environmental historian and author. After law school, Baier moved to Washington, D.C., to practice law. During the early years of his law career, he formed Baier Properties, Inc., based in Bethesda, Maryland. This company develops warehouses, residential properties, award-winning office buildings, and shopping centers.

Baier devoted much of his life's work to natural resources and wildlife conservation. He was one of the original founders of the Wild Sheep Foundation. This organization funds over $2.4 million annually to reestablish historically extant habitats and populations of the four species of wild sheep in North America. Baier's exploratory work for this organization led to his active participation in creating similar programs in Russia and Mongolia.

Baier was active in the Boone and Crockett Club (America's oldest wildlife conservation organization) since 1975. Baier was its first President Emeritus, and was elected an Honorary Life Member in 2016.

Baier took his environmental and wildlife conservation passion into politics as well, having served as an advisor to many elected officials and educators. Baier took the lead in drafting President George H. W. Bush's wildlife conservation agenda in 1989, and was an advisor and counselor to all successive presidential administrations. From 1992 to 2010, Baier led in the creation of Ph.D. programs at four separate universities dedicated to postgraduate studies in natural resources and wildlife conservation management.

From 2004 to 2007, he led a national campaign to raise $6.5 million to purchase for the federal government the last and largest remaining piece of privately held land that was initially Theodore Roosevelt's historic Elkhorn Ranch, established in 1884. Adjacent to the existing Theodore Roosevelt National Park, also once part of the ranch, this purchase expanded the national park by virtually one-third its size. The Elkhorn is popularly called the "Cradle of Conservation" and the "Walden Pond of the West" since between 1884 and 1887 Theodore Roosevelt here conceived the cornerstones of the American conservation movement as we know it today.

== Scholarship ==
Baier authored several books pursuant to his passion for wildlife and natural resources conservation, including Inside the Equal Access to Justice Act: Environmental Litigation and the Crippling Battle over America’s Lands, Endangered Species, and Their Critical Habitat (2016); a sequel, Playing God with Nature: The Codex of the Endangered Species Act (forthcoming 2018); and was at work on Voices from the Wilderness: A Biography, celebrating America's wilderness preservation system and the fiftieth anniversary of the Wilderness Act (due 2019).

Baier's book Inside the Equal Access to Justice Act: Environmental Litigation and the Crippling Battle over America's Lands, Endangered Species, and Critical Habitats was named the 2017 Next Generation Indie Book Awards Grand Prize Winner in non-fiction in 70 categories from over 7,000 books submitted, as well as the Winner in the Science/Nature/Environment category. His book was also chosen as a 2016 Foreword INDIES Book of the Year Award finalist in the two categories of Ecology/Environment and History, as well as a finalist for the Forest History Society’s Charles A. Weyerhaeuser Book Award.

One of America's preeminent experts on environmental litigation, Baier's 2016 book chronicles the century-long story of America's resources management, focusing on litigation, citizen suit provisions, and attorneys' fees. He provides the first book-length comprehensive examination of the little know [Equal Access to Justice Act] (EAJA) and its role in environmental litigation, focusing on its detrimental effect on wildlife and endangered species.

In addition to authoring several books, Baier was published in several law reviews and journals, including:

- "Reforming the Equal Access to Justice Act," 38(1) Notre Dame Journal of Legislation, pp. 1–70 (2012).
- "The Secret World Inside the Animal Rights Agenda," Fair Chase, Part I, pp. 6–10 (Fall 2009) and Part II, pp. 6–13 (Winter 2010).
- "The Cradle of Conservation: Theodore Roosevelt's Elkhorn Ranch, an Icon of America's National Identity," 28(1) Theodore Roosevelt Association Journal, pp. 12–24 (Winter 2007).
- "Dr. Jerome Hall – A North Star in My Life," 81(2) Indiana Law Journal, pp. 465–472 (2006).
- "Substantive Interpretations Under the Antidumping Act and the Foreign Trade Policy of the United States," 17(3) Stanford Law Review, pp. 409–462 (1965).
- "The Developing Principles in the Law of Unauthorized Practice re Real Estate Brokers," 9(1) Saint Louis University Law Journal, pp. 127–134 (1964).

== Professional contributions ==
In addition to his work as an advisor to politicians and educators on conservation issues, Baier had an extensive career of public service and volunteerism, serving on numerous boards and commissions, and was recognized many times over the years for his service, both locally and nationally. He served on the Executive Committee for the Theodore Roosevelt Association, the President's Council of the National Wildlife Federation, the Conservation Leadership Council sponsored by the Environmental Defense Fund, the Roosevelt-Rockefeller Brothers Conservation Roundtable, the Explorers Club, the Cosmos Club, and was Vice Chairman of the National Conservation Leadership Institute.

=== Professional awards and honors ===
- In 2017, Baier was awarded the Rose Award for distinguished service to the Theodore Roosevelt Association.
- In 2016, the National Wildlife Federation awarded him their highest honor, the Jay N. "Ding" Darling Conservation Award for a lifetime of conservation service.
- He received the Distinguished Eagle Scout Award in 2016 from the National Boy Scouts of America.
- In 2015, Indiana University awarded him the degree of Doctor of Humane Letters. That same year, the law school building was named Baier Hall in his honor. In 2017, he was inducted into the President's Circle at Indiana University.
- Baier was honored in 2013 by the Association of Fish and Wildlife Agencies with their Conservationist of the Year, John L. Morris Award, which recognizes a lifetime commitment to fish and wildlife stewardship by citizen conservationists who have exhibited exemplary leadership at the highest level.
- Indiana University Maurer School of Law presented him with the Distinguished Service Award in 2007 and inducted him into the Academy of Law Alumni Fellows, the school's highest honor, in 2014.
- He was awarded the degree Doctorate of Law and Letters from Rocky Mountain College in 2010.
- In 2010, he was honored by Outdoor Life magazine as their Conservationist of the Year.
- He was named Conservationist of the Year in 2008 by the National Fish and Wildlife Foundation.
- He received the Regional Forester's Honor Award from the U.S. Department of Agriculture in 2008.
- Baier received the U.S. Forest Service National Grasslands Prairie Partner Award in 2005.
- He was named Rockville, Maryland's Citizen of the Year in 1986.

== Personal life and death ==
Baier lived in suburban Washington, D.C., with his wife, Bonnie, whom he married in 1968. He was an avid collector of art and 19th century animalier bronze sculpture works. He contemporaneously continued to practice law, specializing in wildlife conservation and natural resources policy, legislation, and regulation, he managed Baier Properties, Inc., and wrote extensively.

Baier died on November 21, 2025, at the age of 85.

== Building awards and honors ==
- Exceptional Design Award for the Best Designed Office Building built in Fairfax County in 1991, for One Cambridge Court, Falls Church, VA, awarded by Board of Supervisors, Fairfax County, VA.
- Cornerstone Award for the Best Suburban Office Building built in Metropolitan Washington, DC, 1990, for One Cambridge Court, Falls Church, VA, awarded by Washington Building for Congress.
- Award of Excellence in 1989, for One Cambridge Court, Falls Church, VA, awarded by National Association of Industrial and Office Parks.
- Award of Excellence in 1986, for Oakton Corporate Center, Oakton, VA, awarded by National Association of Industrial and Office Parks.
- Readers' Choice Award for Best New Office Building in Montgomery County, MD, in 1985, for Jefferson Plaza, Rockville, MD, awarded by Gazette Newspapers.
- Award of Excellence for Best Low-Rise Office Building built in Baltimore-Washington region in 1983, for Democracy Medical Center, Bethesda, MD, awarded by National Association for Industrial and Office Parks.
