= 2016 United States House of Representatives elections in Indiana =

- November 8, 2016

All nine Indiana seats to the United States House of Representatives
	Majority party	Minority party	Third party
Party	Republican	Democratic	Libertarian
Last election	7	2	0
Seats won	7	2	0
Seat change	Steady	Steady	Steady
Popular vote	1,442,989	1,052,901	162,460
Percentage	54.28%	39.61%	6.12%
Swing	▼4.92%	▲2.16%	▲2.77%

Republican
50–60%
60–70%
70–80%
80–90%
Democratic
40–50%
50–60%
60–70%
70–80%
80–90%

The 2016 United States House of Representatives elections in Indiana were held on November 8, 2016, to elect the nine U.S. representatives from the state of Indiana, one from each of the state's nine congressional districts. The elections coincided with the 2016 U.S. presidential election, as well as other elections to the House of Representatives, elections to the United States Senate and various state and local elections. The primaries were held on May 3.

== Results summary ==
=== Statewide ===
United States House of Representatives elections in Indiana, 2016
Party	Votes	Percentage	Seats before	Seats after	+/–
Republican	1,442,989	54.28%	7	7	-
Democratic	1,052,901	39.61%	2	2	-
Libertarian	162,460	6.12%	0	0	-
Totals	2,658,350	100.0%	9	9	—

=== District ===
Results of the 2016 United States House of Representatives elections in Indiana by district:

District	Republican		Democratic		Others		Total		Result
District	Votes	%	Votes	%	Votes	%	Votes	%	Result
District 1	0	0.00%	207,515	81.51%	85,611	18.49%	254,583	100.00%	Democratic hold
District 2	164,355	59.26%	102,401	36.92%	10,601	3.82%	277,357	100.00%	Republican hold
District 3	201,396	70.11%	66,023	22.98%	19,828	6.90%	287,247	100.00%	Republican hold
District 4	193,412	64.59%	91,256	30.48%	14,766	4.93%	299,434	100.00%	Republican hold
District 5	221,957	61.46%	123,849	34.29%	15,329	4.24%	361,135	100.00%	Republican hold
District 6	204,920	69.14%	79,135	26.70%	12,330	4.16%	296,385	100.00%	Republican hold
District 7	94,456	35.69%	158,739	59.98%	11,475	4.34%	264,670	100.00%	Democratic hold
District 8	187,702	63.69%	93,356	31.68%	13,655	4.63%	294,713	100.00%	Republican hold
District 9	174,791	54.14%	130,627	40.46%	17,425	5.40%	322,843	100.00%	Republican hold
Total	1,442,989	54.28%	1,052,901	39.61%	162,460	6.12%	2,658,350	100.00%	

== District 1 ==
2016 Indiana's 1st congressional district election
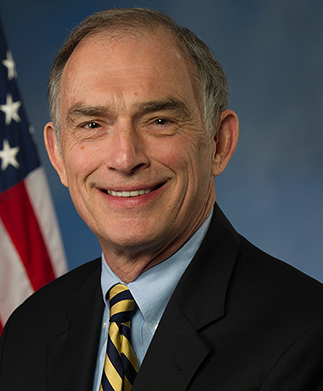

Nominee	Pete Visclosky	Donna Dunn
Party	Democratic	Libertarian
Popular vote	207,515	85,594
Percentage	81.5%	18.5%
- County results Visclosky: 70–80% 80–90%
U.S. Representative before election
Pete Visclosky
Democratic
Elected U.S. Representative
Pete Visclosky
Democratic

Incumbent Democrat Pete Visclosky, who had represented the district since 1985, ran for re-election. He was re-elected with 61% of the vote in 2014. The district had a PVI of D+10.

=== Democratic primary ===
==== Candidates ====
===== Nominee =====
- Pete Visclosky, incumbent U.S. Representative

===== Eliminated in primary =====
- Willie Brown

==== Primary results ====
Democratic primary results
Party	Candidate	Votes	%
Democratic	Pete Visclosky (incumbent)	77,095	80.0
Democratic	Willie (Faithful and True) Brown	19,315	20.0
Total votes		96,410	100.0

=== Republican primary ===
==== Candidates ====
===== Withdrawn =====
- John Meyer

=== Libertarian primary ===
==== Candidates ====
===== Nominee =====
- Donna Dunn

=== General election ===
==== Predictions ====
Source	Ranking	As of
The Cook Political Report	Safe D	November 7, 2016
Daily Kos Elections	Safe D	November 7, 2016
Rothenberg	Safe D	November 3, 2016
Sabato's Crystal Ball	Safe D	November 7, 2016
RCP	Safe D	October 31, 2016

==== Results ====
Indiana's 1st congressional district, 2016
Party	Candidate	Votes	%
Democratic	Pete Visclosky (incumbent)	207,515	81.5
Libertarian	Donna Dunn	47,051	18.5
Independent	John Meyer (write-in)	17	0.0
Total votes		254,583	100.0
Democratic hold			

== District 2 ==
2016 Indiana's 2nd congressional district election
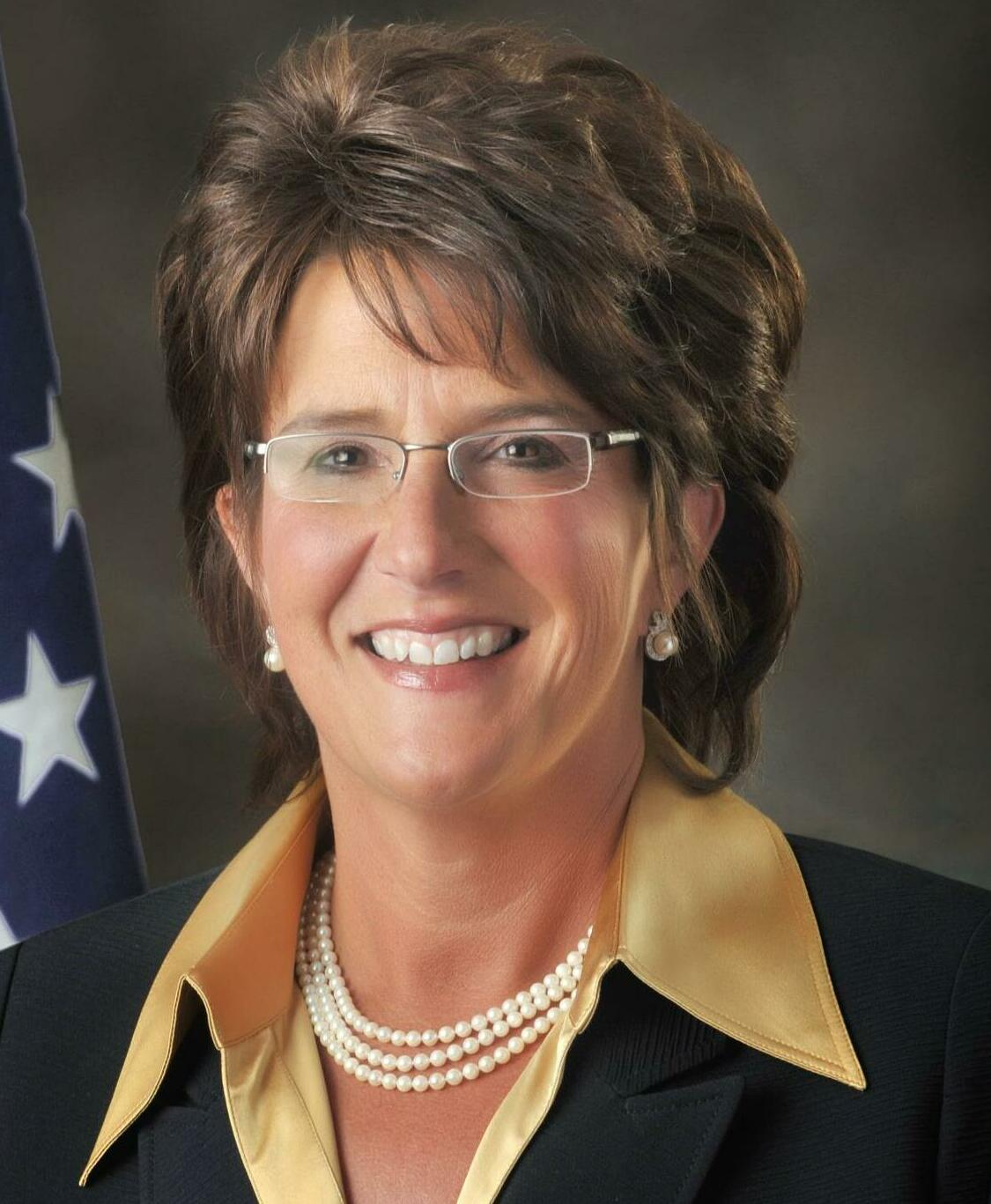

Nominee	Jackie Walorski	Lynn Coleman
Party	Republican	Democratic
Popular vote	164,355	102,401
Percentage	59.3%	36.9%
- County results Walorski: 50–60% 60–70% 70–80% Coleman: 40–50%
U.S. Representative before election
Jackie Walorski
Republican
Elected U.S. Representative
Jackie Walorski
Republican

Incumbent Republican Jackie Walorski, who had represented the district since 2013 ran for re-election. She was re-elected with 59% of the vote in 2014. The district had a PVI of R+6.

=== Republican primary ===
Walorski was considered a potential candidate for the U.S. Senate, but decided to run for re-election instead.

==== Candidates ====
===== Nominee =====
- Jackie Walorski, incumbent U.S. Representative

===== Eliminated in primary =====
- Jeff Petermann

==== Primary results ====
Republican primary results
Party	Candidate	Votes	%
Republican	Jackie Walorski (incumbent)	77,400	69.8
Republican	Jeff Petermann	33,523	30.2
Total votes		110,923	100.0

=== Democratic primary ===
Democrats attempted to recruit State Representative David L. Niezgodski, but he decided to run for re-election instead.

==== Candidates ====
===== Nominee =====
- Lynn Coleman, former Division Chief at South Bend Police Department and former aide to Mayor Steve Luecke

===== Eliminated in primary =====
- Douglas Carpenter, candidate for this seat in 2014

===== Declined =====
- David L. Niezgodski, state representative

==== Primary results ====
Democratic primary results
Party	Candidate	Votes	%
Democratic	Lynn Coleman	39,372	73.8
Democratic	Douglas Carpenter	14,013	26.2
Total votes		53,385	100.0

=== General election ===
==== Predictions ====
Source	Ranking	As of
The Cook Political Report	Likely R	November 7, 2016
Daily Kos Elections	Likely R	November 7, 2016
Rothenberg	Safe R	November 3, 2016
Sabato's Crystal Ball	Likely R	November 7, 2016
RCP	Likely R	October 31, 2016

==== Results ====
Indiana's 2nd congressional district, 2016
Party	Candidate	Votes	%
Republican	Jackie Walorski (incumbent)	164,355	59.3
Democratic	Lynn Coleman	102,401	36.9
Libertarian	Ron Cenkush	10,601	3.8
Total votes		277,357	100.0
Republican hold			

== District 3 ==
2016 Indiana's 3rd congressional district election
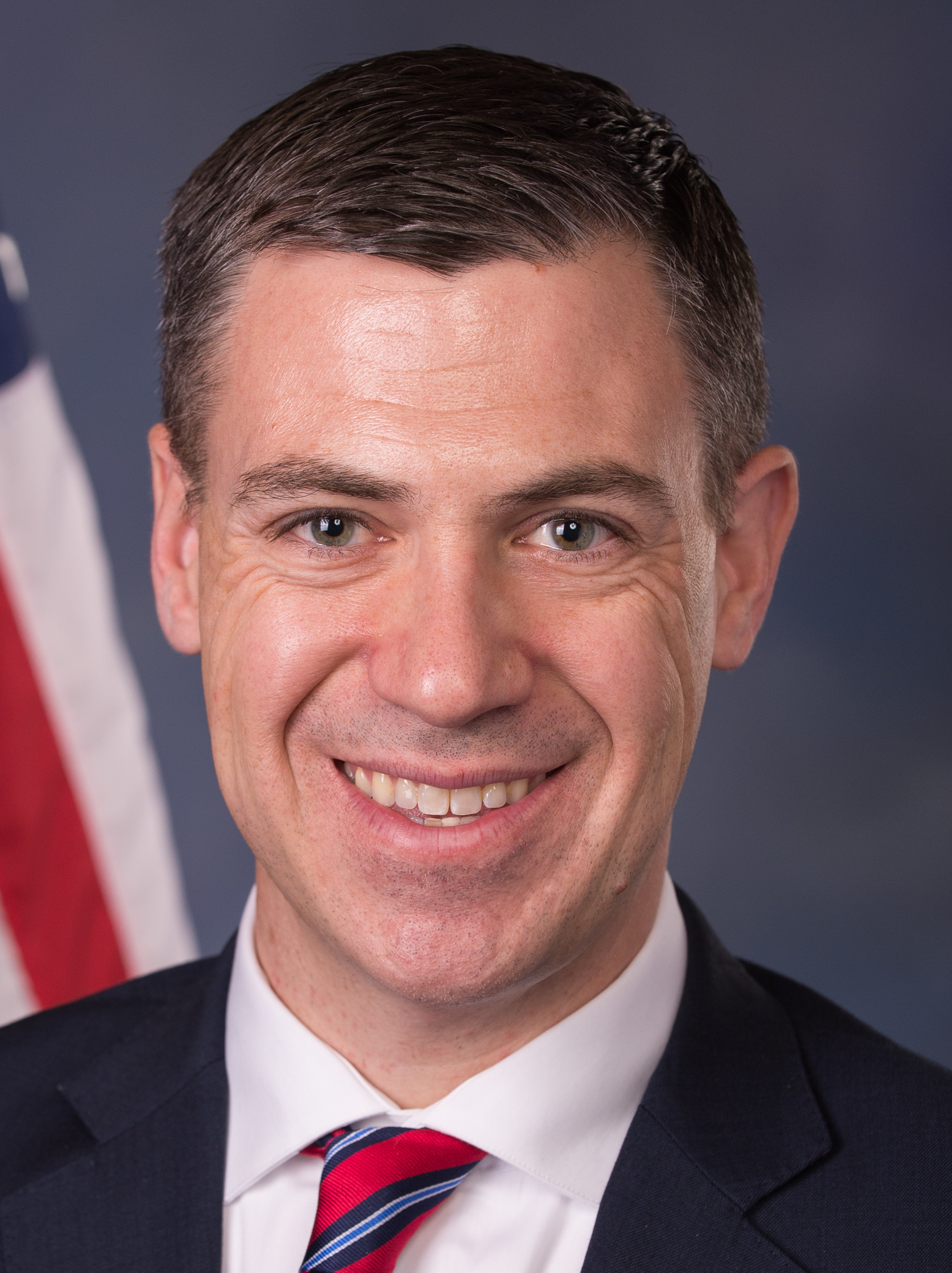

Nominee	Jim Banks	Thomas Schrader	Pepper Snyder
Party	Republican	Democratic	Libertarian
Popular vote	201,396	66,023	19,828
Percentage	70.1%	23.0%	6.9%
- County results Banks: 60–70% 70–80%
U.S. Representative before election
Marlin Stutzman
Republican
Elected U.S. Representative
Jim Banks
Republican

Incumbent Republican Marlin Stutzman, who had represented the district since 2010, did not run for reelection. Stutzman instead opted to run in the U.S. Senate election primary to succeed Dan Coats, who was retiring. He was re-elected with 66% of the vote in 2014. The district had a PVI of R+13.

=== Republican primary ===
==== Candidates ====
===== Nominee =====
- Jim Banks, state senator

===== Eliminated in primary =====
- Mark Willard Baringer, candidate for this seat in 2014
- Liz Brown, state senator
- Pam Galloway, former Wisconsin state senator
- Kevin Howell, former Allen County councilor
- Kip Tom, farmer

===== Withdrawn =====
- Scott Wise, former Whitley County Council member and Libertarian nominee for this seat in 2010 and 2014

===== Declined =====
- Marlin Stutzman, incumbent U.S. Representative
- Bob Thomas, auto dealer

==== Endorsements ====
Jim Banks

Organizations

- Club for Growth
- FreedomWorks
- Senate Conservatives Fund
- Tea Party Express
Liz Brown

Organizations

- Susan B. Anthony List
Kip E. Tom

Organizations

- Republican Main Street Partnership

Individuals

- Don Villwock, former President of the Indiana Farm Bureau

==== Polling ====
Poll source	Date(s) administered	Sample size	Margin of error	Jim Banks	Mark Willard Baringer	Liz Brown	Pam Galloway	Kevin Howell	Kip Tom	Undecided
Mike Downs Center for Indiana Politics	April 2016	400	±4.9%	29%	1%	22%	5%	1%	23%	20%

==== Primary results ====
Republican primary results
Party	Candidate	Votes	%
Republican	Jim Banks	46,533	34.3
Republican	Kip E. Tom	42,732	31.5
Republican	Liz Brown	33,654	24.8
Republican	Pam Galloway	9,543	7.0
Republican	Kevin Howell	1,970	1.5
Republican	Mark Willard Baringer	1,266	0.9
Total votes		135,698	100.0

=== Democratic primary ===
==== Candidates ====
===== Nominee =====
- Tommy A. Schrader, blue collar worker and perennial candidate

===== Eliminated in primary =====
- Todd Nightenhelser, small business owner
- John Forrest Roberson, veteran, candidate for this seat in 2012 and candidate for Mayor of Fort Wayne, Indiana in 2015

===== Withdrawn =====
- Toby Lamp

==== Primary results ====
Democratic primary results
Party	Candidate	Votes	%
Democratic	Tommy A. Schrader	15,267	37.5
Democratic	Todd Nightenhelser	12,956	31.8
Democratic	John Forrest Roberson	12,487	30.7
Total votes		40,710	100.0

=== General election ===
==== Endorsements ====
Jim Banks (R)

Organizations

- Club for Growth
- FreedomWorks
- National Republican Congressional Committee "On the Radar" Program
- Senate Conservatives Fund
- Tea Party Express

==== Predictions ====
Source	Ranking	As of
The Cook Political Report	Safe R	November 7, 2016
Daily Kos Elections	Safe R	November 7, 2016
Rothenberg	Safe R	November 3, 2016
Sabato's Crystal Ball	Safe R	November 7, 2016
RCP	Safe R	October 31, 2016

==== Results ====
Indiana's 3rd congressional district, 2016
Party	Candidate	Votes	%
Republican	Jim Banks	201,396	70.1
Democratic	Thomas Schrader	66,023	23.0
Libertarian	Pepper Snyder	19,828	6.9
Total votes		287,247	100.0
Republican hold			

== District 4 ==
2016 Indiana's 4th congressional district election
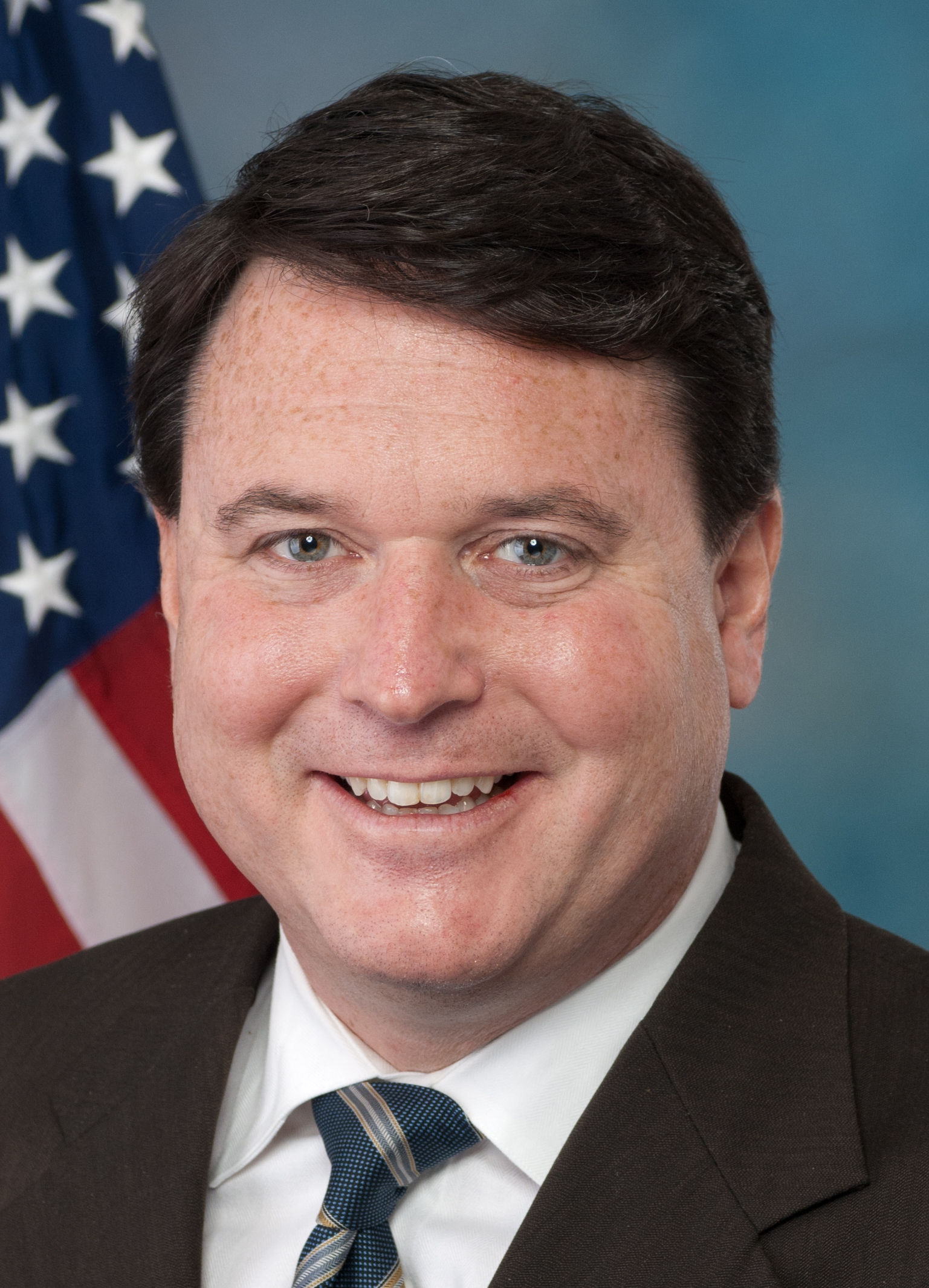

Nominee	Todd Rokita	John Dale
Party	Republican	Democratic
Popular vote	193,412	91,256
Percentage	64.6%	30.5%
- County results Rokita: 50–60% 60–70% 70–80%
U.S. Representative before election
Todd Rokita
Republican
Elected U.S. Representative
Todd Rokita
Republican

Incumbent Republican Todd Rokita, who had represented the district since 2011, ran for re-election. He was re-elected with 67% of the vote in 2014. The district had a PVI of R+11. Rokita considered running for the open US Senate seat, but decided to run for re-election instead.

=== Republican primary ===
==== Candidates ====
===== Nominee =====
- Todd Rokita, incumbent U.S. Representative

===== Eliminated in primary =====
- Kevin J. Grant, accountant, financial advisor, consultant, US Army veteran, National Guard veteran, and candidate for this seat inn 2014

==== Primary results ====
Republican primary results
Party	Candidate	Votes	%
Republican	Todd Rokita (incumbent)	86,051	69.3
Republican	Kevin J. Grant	38,200	30.7
Total votes		124,251	100.0

=== Democratic primary ===
==== Candidates ====
===== Nominee =====
- John Dale, farmer, teacher, nominee for this seat in 2014

===== Withdrawn =====
- Ryan Farrar, family case manager with the Department of Child Services

==== Primary results ====
Democratic primary results
Party	Candidate	Votes	%
Democratic	John Dale	43,401	100.0
Total votes		43,401	100.0

=== General election ===
==== Campaign ====
After Donald Trump selected Mike Pence, the Governor of Indiana, as his running mate, Rokita dropped out of the House election to file as a candidate for governor. The vacancy on the ballot will need to be filled by precinct chairs in the district by August 14, and Rokita could be reinstalled on the ballot if he was not selected for governor. Ultimately Eric Holcomb, Pence's lieutenant governor, was nominated, and Rokita resumed his re-election campaign.

==== Predictions ====
Source	Ranking	As of
The Cook Political Report	Safe R	November 7, 2016
Daily Kos Elections	Safe R	November 7, 2016
Rothenberg	Safe R	November 3, 2016
Sabato's Crystal Ball	Safe R	November 7, 2016
RCP	Safe R	October 31, 2016

==== Results ====
Indiana's 4th congressional district, 2016
Party	Candidate	Votes	%
Republican	Todd Rokita (incumbent)	193,412	64.6
Democratic	John Dale	91,256	30.5
Libertarian	Steven Mayoras	14,766	4.9
Total votes		299,434	100.0
Republican hold			

== District 5 ==
2016 Indiana's 5th congressional district election
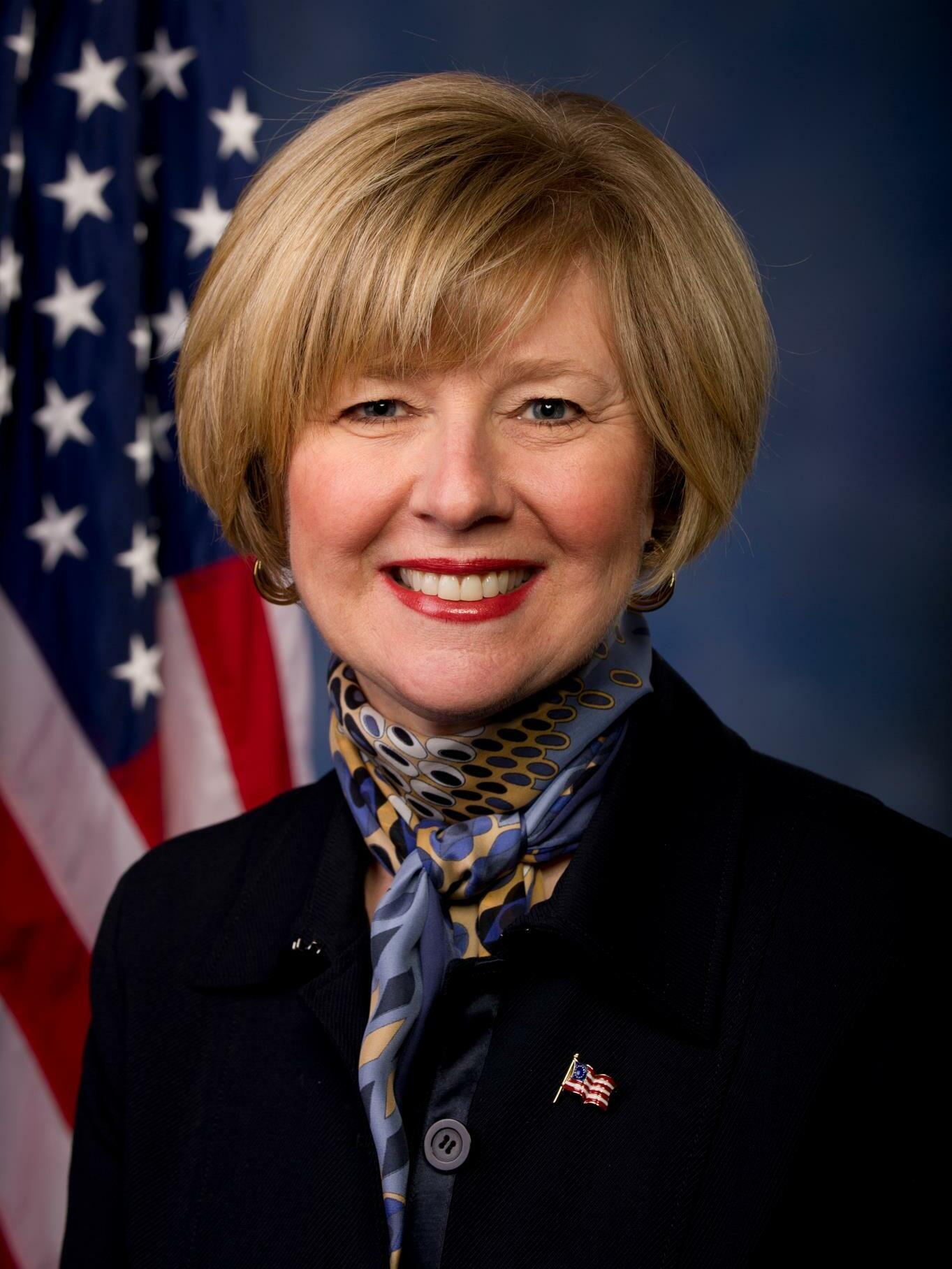

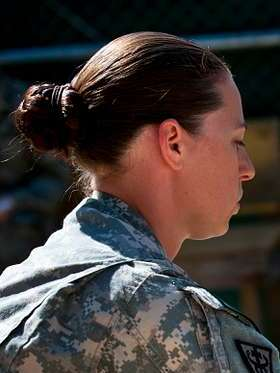
Nominee	Susan Brooks	Angela Demaree
Party	Republican	Democratic
Popular vote	221,957	123,849
Percentage	61.5%	34.3%
- County results Brooks: 60–70% 70–80% Demaree: 40–50%
U.S. Representative before election
Susan Brooks
Republican
Elected U.S. Representative
Susan Brooks
Republican

Incumbent Republican Susan Brooks, who had represented the district since 2013, ran for re-election. She was re-elected with 65% of the vote in 2014. The district had a PVI of R+9. Brooks was running for re-election.

=== Republican primary ===
==== Candidates ====
===== Nominee =====
- Susan Brooks, incumbent U.S. Representative

===== Eliminated in primary =====
- Mike Campbell
- Stephen M. MacKenzie, business consultant and veteran

==== Primary results ====
Republican primary results
Party	Candidate	Votes	%
Republican	Susan Brooks (incumbent)	95,209	69.5
Republican	Stephen M. MacKenzie	21,575	15.8
Republican	Mike Campbell	20,202	14.7
Total votes		136,986	100.0

=== Democratic primary ===
==== Candidates ====
===== Nominee =====
- Angela Demaree, veterinarian and Army Reserve officer

===== Eliminated in primary =====
- Allen R. Davidson, engineer

==== Primary results ====
Democratic primary results
Party	Candidate	Votes	%
Democratic	Angela Demaree	52,530	74.9
Democratic	Allen R. Davidson	17,587	25.1
Total votes		70,117	100.0

=== General election ===
==== Campaign ====
After Trump selected Pence as his running mate, Brooks dropped out of the House election to file as a candidate for governor. The vacancy on the ballot needed to be filled by precinct chairs in the district by August 14, and Brooks could have been reinstalled on the ballot if she was not selected for governor. Ultimately Eric Holcomb, Pence's lieutenant governor was nominated and Brooks resumed her re-election campaign.

==== Predictions ====
Source	Ranking	As of
The Cook Political Report	Safe R	November 7, 2016
Daily Kos Elections	Safe R	November 7, 2016
Rothenberg	Safe R	November 3, 2016
Sabato's Crystal Ball	Safe R	November 7, 2016
RCP	Safe R	October 31, 2016

==== Results ====
Indiana's 5th congressional district, 2016
Party	Candidate	Votes	%
Republican	Susan Brooks (incumbent)	221,957	61.5
Democratic	Angela Demaree	123,849	34.3
Libertarian	Matthew Wittlief	15,329	4.2
Total votes		361,135	100.0
Republican hold			

== District 6 ==
2016 Indiana's 6th congressional district election
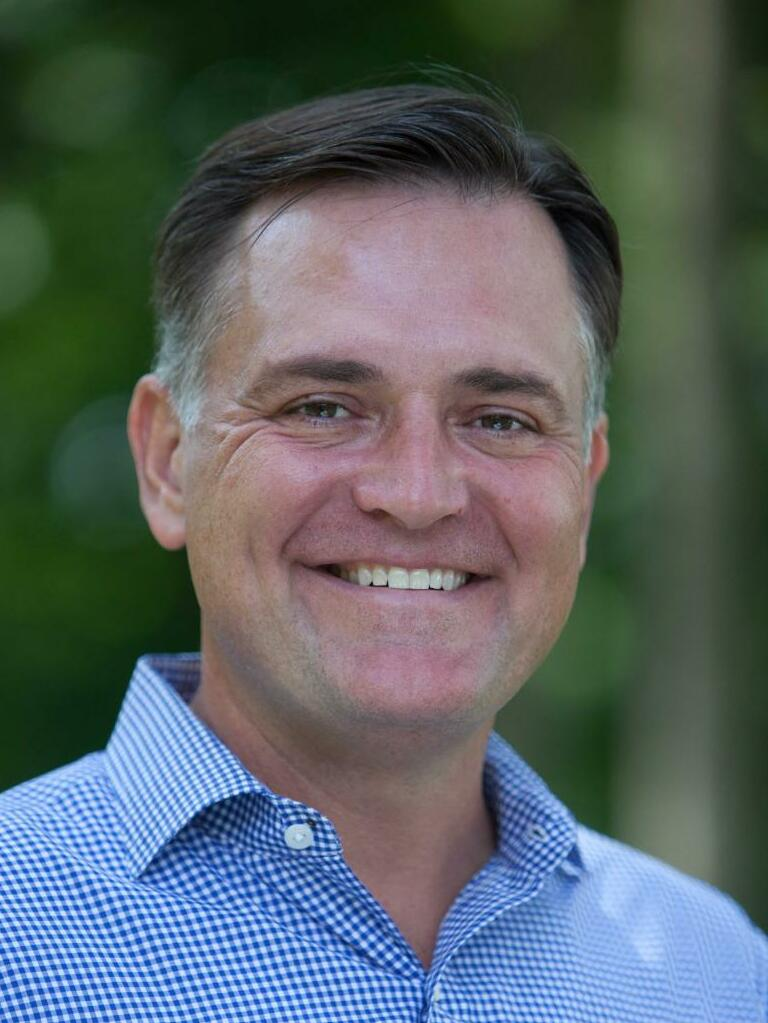

Nominee	Luke Messer	Barry Welsh
Party	Republican	Democratic
Popular vote	204,920	79,135
Percentage	69.1%	26.7%
- Messer: 50–60% 60–70% 70–80% 80–90%
U.S. Representative before election
Luke Messer
Republican
Elected U.S. Representative
Luke Messer
Republican

The incumbent was Republican Luke Messer, who had represented the district since 2013. He was re-elected with 66% of the vote in 2014. The district had a PVI of R+12.

=== Republican primary ===
==== Candidates ====
===== Nominee =====
- Luke Messer, incumbent U.S. Representative

===== Eliminated in primary =====
- Charles Chuck Johnson Jr.
- Jeff Smith

==== Primary results ====
Republican primary results
Party	Candidate	Votes	%
Republican	Luke Messer (incumbent)	91,828	77.6
Republican	Jeff Smith	14,963	12.7
Republican	Charles Chuck Johnson Jr.	11,447	9.7
Total votes		118,238	100.0

=== Democratic primary ===
==== Candidates ====
===== Nominee =====
- Barry Welsh, pastor

===== Eliminated in primary =====
- Danny Basham, Lexington Township Trustee
- George Thomas Holland, salesman
- Bruce W. Peavler
- Ralph Spelbring

==== Primary results ====
Democratic primary results
Party	Candidate	Votes	%
Democratic	Barry Welsh	15,258	35.6
Democratic	Danny Basham	10,474	24.4
Democratic	George Thomas Holland	8,851	20.7
Democratic	Bruce W. Peavler	4,897	11.4
Democratic	Ralph Spelbring	3,385	7.9
Total votes		42,865	100.0

=== General election ===
==== Predictions ====
Source	Ranking	As of
The Cook Political Report	Safe R	November 7, 2016
Daily Kos Elections	Safe R	November 7, 2016
Rothenberg	Safe R	November 3, 2016
Sabato's Crystal Ball	Safe R	November 7, 2016
RCP	Safe R	October 31, 2016

==== Results ====
Indiana's 6th congressional district, 2016
Party	Candidate	Votes	%
Republican	Luke Messer (incumbent)	204,920	69.1
Democratic	Barry A. Welsh	79,135	26.7
Libertarian	Rich Turvey	12,330	4.2
Total votes		296,385	100.0
Republican hold			

== District 7 ==
2016 Indiana's 7th congressional district election
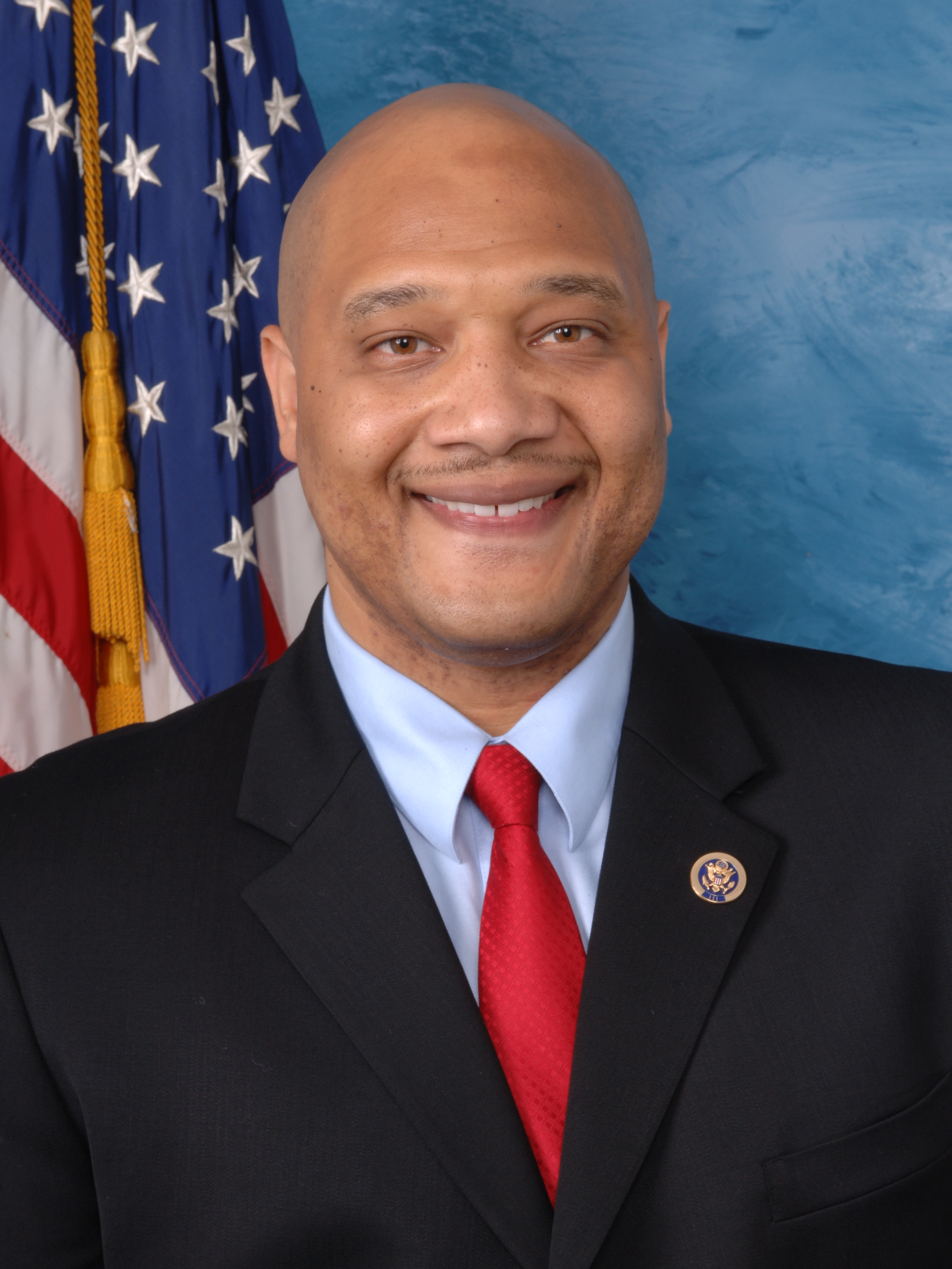

Nominee	André Carson	Catherine Ping
Party	Democratic	Republican
Popular vote	158,739	94,456
Percentage	60.0%	35.7%
- County results Carson: 50–60%
U.S. Representative before election
André Carson
Democratic
Elected U.S. Representative
André Carson
Democratic

Incumbent Democrat André Carson had represented the district since 2008. He was re-elected with 55% of the vote in 2014. The district had a PVI of D+13.

=== Democratic primary ===
==== Candidates ====
===== Nominee =====
- Andre Carson, incumbent U.S. Representative

===== Eliminated in primary =====
- Curtis D. Godfrey
- Pierre Quincy Pullins

==== Primary results ====
Democratic primary results
Party	Candidate	Votes	%
Democratic	Andre Carson (incumbent)	70,006	85.6
Democratic	Curtis D. Godfrey	8,306	10.2
Democratic	Pierre Quincy Pullins	3,435	4.2
Total votes		81,747	100.0

=== Republican primary ===
==== Candidates ====
===== Nominee =====
- Catherine Ping, Army Reserve lieutenant colonel, business owner, candidate for this seat in 2012 and nominee in 2014

===== Eliminated in primary =====
- Wayne Harmon, parole agent and candidate for this seat in 2012 & 2014
- JD Miniear, Christian ministry outreach and candidate for this seat in 2012 & 2014

==== Primary results ====
Republican primary results
Party	Candidate	Votes	%
Republican	Catherine "Cat" Ping	30,514	53.1
Republican	Wayne "Gunny" Harmon	16,955	29.5
Republican	JD Miniear	10,031	17.4
Total votes		57,500	100.0

=== General election ===
==== Predictions ====
Source	Ranking	As of
The Cook Political Report	Safe D	November 7, 2016
Daily Kos Elections	Safe D	November 7, 2016
Rothenberg	Safe D	November 3, 2016
Sabato's Crystal Ball	Safe D	November 7, 2016
RCP	Safe D	October 31, 2016

==== Results ====
Indiana's 7th congressional district, 2016
Party	Candidate	Votes	%
Democratic	Andre Carson (incumbent)	158,739	60.0
Republican	Catherine "Cat" Ping	94,456	35.7
Libertarian	Drew Thompson	11,475	4.3
Total votes		264,670	100.0
Democratic hold			

== District 8 ==
2016 Indiana's 8th congressional district election
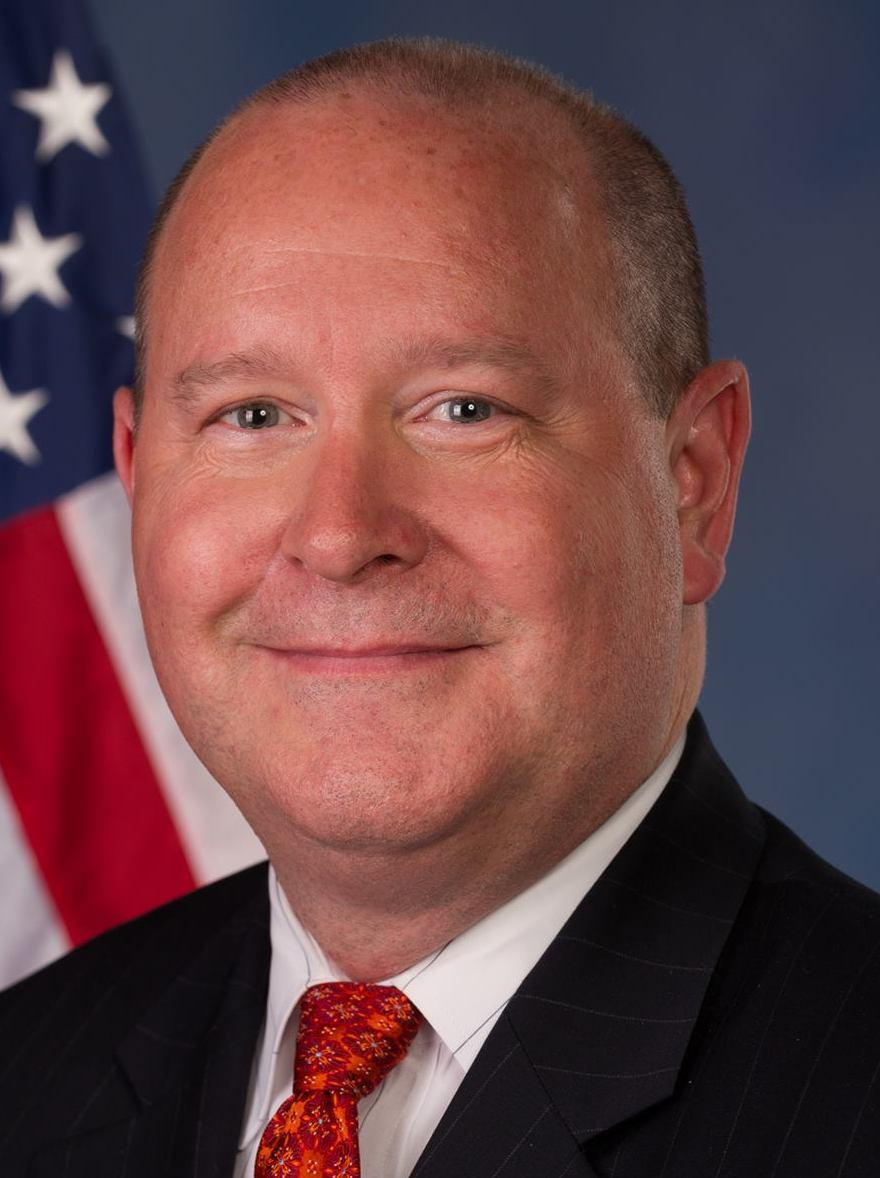

Nominee	Larry Bucshon	Ron Drake
Party	Republican	Democratic
Popular vote	187,702	93,356
Percentage	63.7%	31.7%
- County results Bucshon: 50–60% 60–70% 70–80% 80–90%
U.S. Representative before election
Larry Bucshon
Republican
Elected U.S. Representative
Larry Bucshon
Republican

Incumbent Republican Larry Bucshon, who had represented the district since 2011, ran for re-election. He was re-elected with 60% of the vote in 2014. The district had a PVI of R+8.

=== Republican primary ===
==== Candidates ====
===== Nominee =====
- Larry Bucshon, incumbent U.S. Representative

===== Eliminated in primary =====
- Richard Moss, specialist

==== Primary results ====
Republican primary results
Party	Candidate	Votes	%
Republican	Larry Bucshon (incumbent)	72,889	65.1
Republican	Richard Moss	39,168	34.9
Total votes		112,057	100.0

=== Democratic primary ===
==== Candidates ====
===== Nominee =====
- Ron Drake, former state representative

===== Eliminated in primary =====
- David Orentlicher, former state representative

===== Withdrawn =====
- Rachel Covington

==== Primary results ====
Democratic primary results
Party	Candidate	Votes	%
Democratic	Ron Drake	29,264	50.1
Democratic	David Orentlicher	29,196	49.9
Total votes		58,460	100.0

=== Libertarian primary ===
==== Candidates ====
===== Nominee =====
- Andrew Horning, product manager, nominee for governor in 2008 and for U.S. Senate in 2012

=== General election ===
==== Predictions ====
Source	Ranking	As of
The Cook Political Report	Safe R	November 7, 2016
Daily Kos Elections	Safe R	November 7, 2016
Rothenberg	Safe R	November 3, 2016
Sabato's Crystal Ball	Safe R	November 7, 2016
RCP	Safe R	October 31, 2016

==== Results ====
Indiana's 8th congressional district, 2016
Party	Candidate	Votes	%
Republican	Larry Bucshon (incumbent)	187,702	63.7
Democratic	Ron Drake	93,356	31.7
Libertarian	Andrew Horning	13,655	4.6
Total votes		294,713	100.0
Republican hold			

== District 9 ==
2016 Indiana's 9th congressional district election
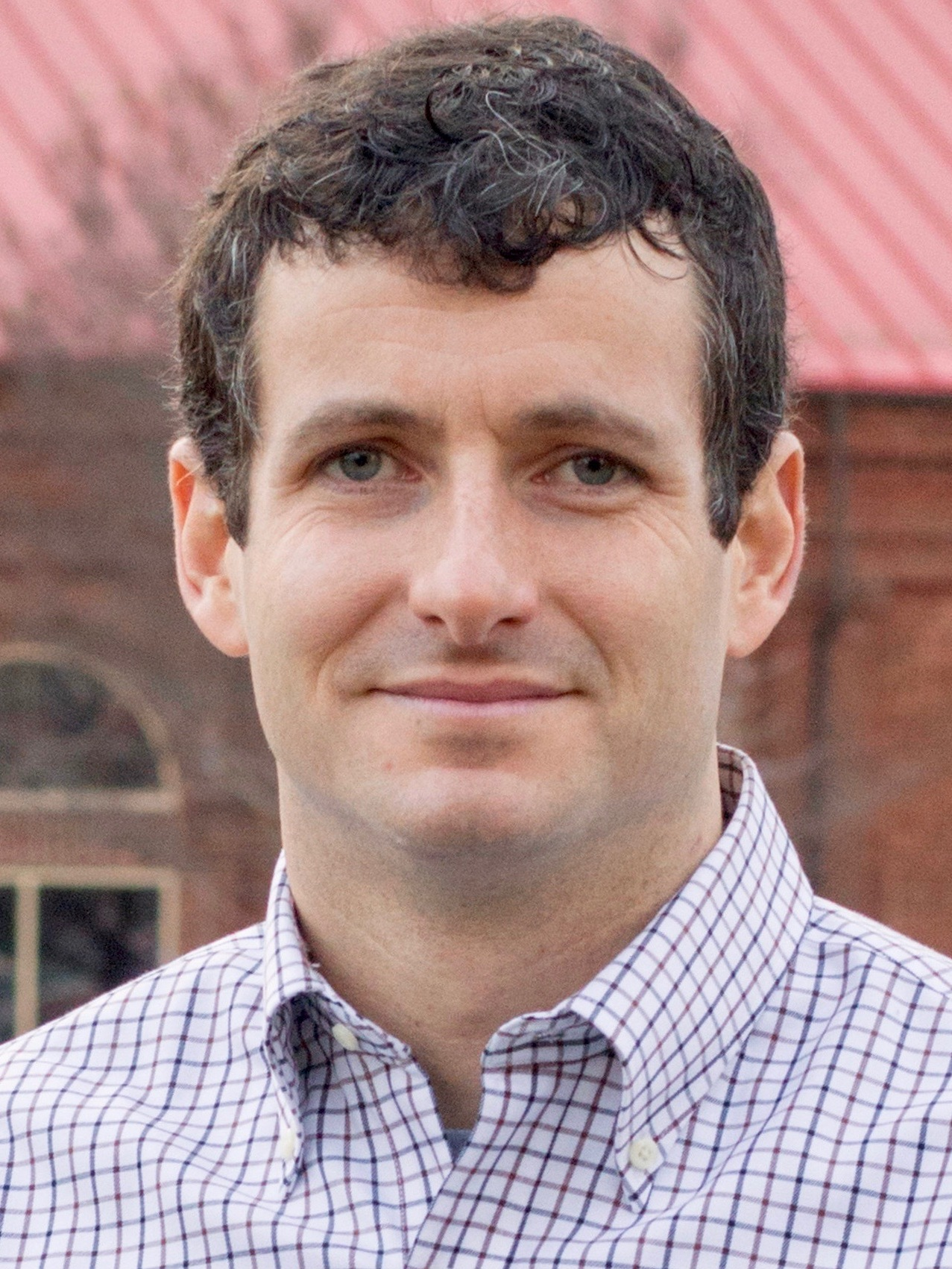

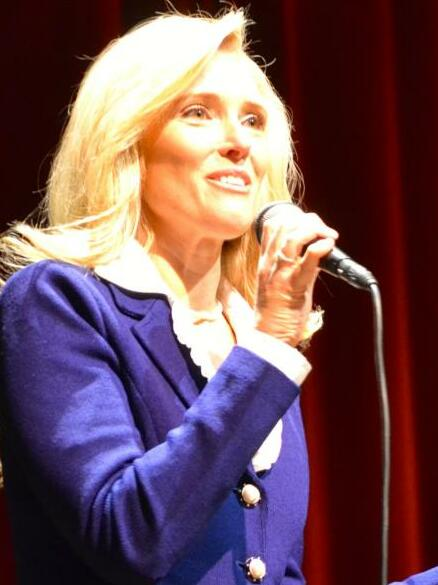

Nominee	Trey Hollingsworth	Shelli Yoder	Russell Brooksbank
Party	Republican	Democratic	Libertarian
Popular vote	174,791	130,627	17,425
Percentage	54.1%	40.5%	5.4%
- County results Hollingsworth: 50–60% 60–70% Yoder: 60–70%
U.S. Representative before election
Todd Young
Republican
Elected U.S. Representative
Trey Hollingsworth
Republican

Incumbent Republican Todd Young, who had represented the district since 2011, did not run for re-election. Young instead opted to run for the open U.S. Senate seat. He was re-elected with 62% of the vote in 2014. The district had a PVI of R+9.

=== Republican primary ===
==== Candidates ====
===== Nominee =====
- Trey Hollingsworth, businessman

===== Eliminated in primary =====
- Robert Hall, engineer
- Erin Houchin, state senator
- Brent Waltz, state senator
- Greg Zoeller, Indiana Attorney General

===== Withdrawn =====
- Jim Pfaff, conservative radio host

==== Primary results ====
Republican primary results
Party	Candidate	Votes	%
Republican	Trey Hollingsworth	40,767	33.6
Republican	Erin Houchin	30,396	25.0
Republican	Greg Zoeller	26,554	21.8
Republican	Brent Waltz	15,759	13.0
Republican	Robert Hall	8,036	6.6
Total votes		121,512	100.0

=== Democratic primary ===
==== Candidates ====
===== Nominee =====
- Shelli Yoder, Monroe County Council member and nominee for this seat in 2012

===== Eliminated in primary =====
- Bob Kern, paralegal and Perennial candidate
- James R. McClure Jr., candidate for this seat in 2014
- Bill Thomas

==== Primary results ====
Democratic primary results
Party	Candidate	Votes	%
Democratic	Shelli Yoder	44,253	70.1
Democratic	Bob Kern	7,298	11.6
Democratic	James R. McClure Jr.	6,574	10.4
Democratic	Bill Thomas	4,990	7.9
Total votes		63,115	100.0

=== Libertarian primary ===
==== Candidates ====
===== Nominee =====
- Russell Brooksbank, local Teamsters Chief Steward and Libertarian Party Vice Chair in Clark County

=== General election ===
==== Endorsements ====
Trey Hollingsworth (R)

Organizations

- National Republican Congressional Committee "On the Radar" Program
Shelli Yoder (D)

Organizations

- Democratic Congressional Campaign Committee "Red to Blue" Program

==== Polling ====
Poll source	Date(s) administered	Sample size	Margin of error	Trey Hollingsworth (R)	Shelli Yoder (D)	Russell Brooksbank (L)	Undecided
Garin Hart Yang Research Group (D-Yoder)	October 17–18, 2016	400	± 5.0%	43%	43%	5%	9%
Normington Petts & Associates (D-HMP)	October 12–13, 2016	400	± 4.9%	40%	38%	4%	18%
Global Strategy Group (D-DCCC)	September 29–October 2, 2016	400	± 4.9%	44%	42%	−	14%
Garin Hart Yang Research Group (D-Yoder)	May 23–25, 2016	401	± 5.0%	43%	43%	−	14%

==== Predictions ====
Source	Ranking	As of
The Cook Political Report	Lean R	November 7, 2016
Daily Kos Elections	Lean R	November 7, 2016
Rothenberg	Likely R	November 3, 2016
Sabato's Crystal Ball	Lean R	November 7, 2016
RCP	Likely R	October 31, 2016

==== Results ====
Hollingsworth defeated Yoder by 14 points, winning with 54% of the vote.

Indiana's 9th congressional district, 2016
Party	Candidate	Votes	%
Republican	Trey Hollingsworth	174,791	54.1
Democratic	Shelli Yoder	130,627	40.5
Libertarian	Russell Brooksbank	17,425	5.4
Total votes		322,843	100.0
Republican hold			
