= Joe Bock =

Joe Bock may refer to:

- Joe Bock (academic) (born 1957), University of Notre Dame official and former Missouri state representative
- Joe Bock (American football) (born 1959), former American football player
- Joseph Bock (1837–1925), American politician from Wisconsin
