= 2014 United States House of Representatives elections in Indiana =

- November 4, 2014

All 9 Indiana seats to the United States House of Representatives
	Majority party	Minority party
Party	Republican	Democratic
Last election	7	2
Seats won	7	2
Seat change	Steady	Steady
Popular vote	793,759	502,104
Percentage	59.20%	37.45%
Swing	▲6.27%	▼7.29%

Republican
40–50%
50–60%
60–70%
70–80%
Democratic
40–50%
50–60%
60–70%

The 2014 U.S. House of Representatives elections in Indiana was held on Tuesday, November 4, 2014, to elect 9 members of the U.S. House of Representatives from Indiana. The Members elected at this election will serve in the 114th Congress. Indiana has placed Republican and Democratic nominees on the ballot in a nation-best 189 consecutive U.S. House races across each of the last 19 election cycles since 1978.

== Overview ==
United States House of Representatives elections in Indiana, 2014
Party	Votes	Percentage	Seats	+/–
Republican	788,762	58.78%	7	-
Democratic	502,104	37.42%	2	-
Libertarian	50,948	3.80%	0	-
Totals	1,341,814	100.00%	9	-

=== By district ===
Results of the 2014 United States House of Representatives elections in Indiana by district:

District	Republican		Democratic		Others		Total		Result
District	Votes	%	Votes	%	Votes	%	Votes	%	Result
District 1	51,000	35.84%	86,579	60.85%	4,714	3.31%	142,293	100.0%	Democratic hold
District 2	85,583	58.94%	55,590	38.29%	4,027	2.77%	145,200	100.0%	Republican hold
District 3	97,892	65.79%	39,771	26.73%	11,130	7.48%	148,793	100.0%	Republican hold
District 4	94,998	66.87%	47,056	33.13%	0	0.00%	142,054	100.0%	Republican hold
District 5	105,277	65.21%	49,756	30.82%	6,407	3.97%	161,440	100.0%	Republican hold
District 6	102,187	65.90%	45,509	29.35%	7,375	4.76%	155,071	100.0%	Republican hold
District 7	46,887	41.77%	61,443	54.73%	3,931	3.50%	112,261	100.0%	Democratic hold
District 8	103,344	60.32%	61,384	35.83%	6,587	3.85%	171,315	100.0%	Republican hold
District 9	101,594	62.17%	55,016	33.67%	6,777	4.15%	163,387	100.0%	Republican hold
Total	788,762	58.78%	502,104	37.42%	50,948	3.80%	1,341,814	100.0%	

== District 1 ==
2014 Indiana's 1st congressional district election
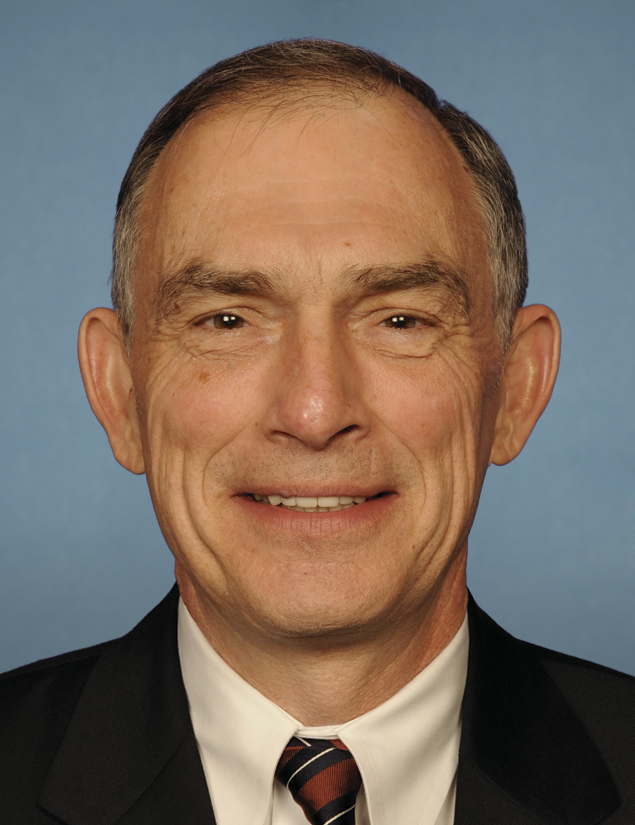

Nominee	Pete Visclosky	Mark Leyva
Party	Democratic	Republican
Popular vote	86,579	51,000
Percentage	60.9%	35.8%
- County results Visclosky: 50–60% 60–70%
U.S. Representative before election
Pete Visclosky
Democratic
Elected U.S. Representative
Pete Visclosky
Democratic

Incumbent Democrat Pete Visclosky, who had represented the 1st district since 1985, ran for re-election.

=== Democratic primary ===
==== Candidates ====
===== Nominee =====
- Pete Visclosky, incumbent U.S. Representative

==== Primary results ====
Democratic primary results
Party	Candidate	Votes	%
Democratic	Pete Visclosky (incumbent)	34,446	100.0

=== Republican primary ===
==== Candidates ====
===== Nominee =====
- Mark Leyva, activist and nominee for this seat in 2010

==== Primary results ====
Republican primary results
Party	Candidate	Votes	%
Republican	Mark Leyva	12,738	100.0

=== General election ===
==== Predictions ====
Source	Ranking	As of
The Cook Political Report	Safe D	November 3, 2014
Rothenberg	Safe D	October 24, 2014
Sabato's Crystal Ball	Safe D	October 30, 2014
RCP	Safe D	November 2, 2014
Daily Kos Elections	Safe D	November 4, 2014

==== Results ====
Indiana's 1st congressional district, 2014
Party	Candidate	Votes	%
Democratic	Pete Visclosky (incumbent)	86,579	60.9
Republican	Mark Leyva	51,000	35.8
Libertarian	Donna Dunn	4,714	3.3
Total votes		142,293	100.0
Democratic hold			

== District 2 ==
2014 Indiana's 2nd congressional district election
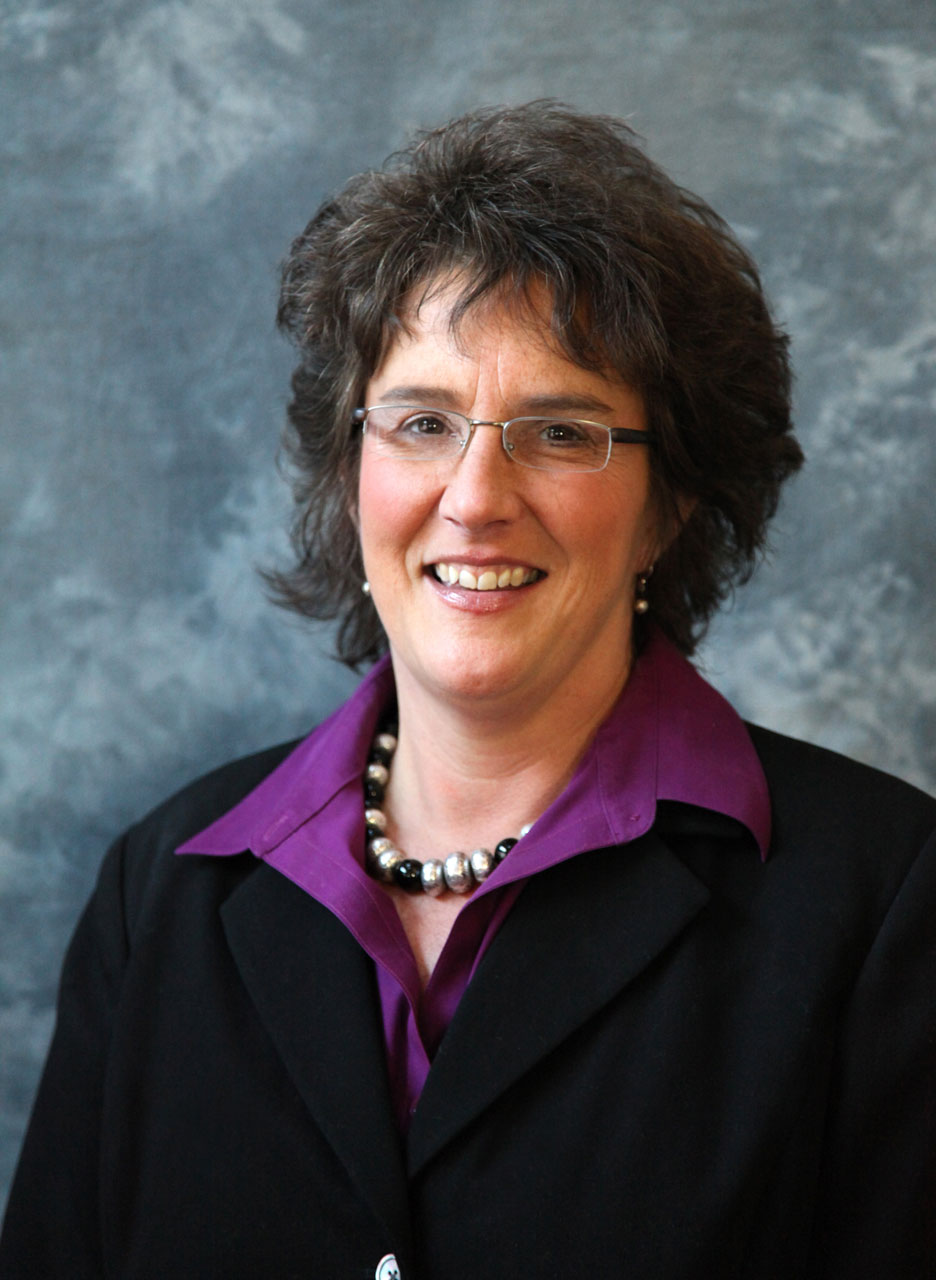

Nominee	Jackie Walorski	Joe Bock
Party	Republican	Democratic
Popular vote	85,583	55,590
Percentage	58.9%	38.3%
- County results Walorski: 50–60% 60–70% 70–80% Bock: 40–50%
U.S. Representative before election
Jackie Walorski
Republican
Elected U.S. Representative
Jackie Walorski
Republican

Incumbent Republican Jackie Walorski, who had represented the 2nd district since 2013, ran for re-election.

=== Republican primary ===
==== Candidates ====
===== Nominee =====
- Jackie Walorski, incumbent U.S. Representative

==== Primary results ====
Republican primary results
Party	Candidate	Votes	%
Republican	Jackie Walorski (incumbent)	28,641	100.0

=== Democratic primary ===
==== Candidates ====
===== Nominee =====
- Joe Bock, University of Notre Dame administrator

===== Eliminated in primary =====
- Douglas Carpenter, caregiver
- Bob Kern, part-time paralegal
- Dan Morrison, retired former RV industry executive, small business owner and candidate for this seat in 2012

===== Declined =====
- Ryan Dvorak, state representative
- Brendan Mullen, Army veteran, military contractor and nominee for this seat in 2012

==== Primary results ====
Democratic primary results
Party	Candidate	Votes	%
Democratic	Joe Bock	11,103	58.1
Democratic	Dan Morrison	3,540	18.5
Democratic	Bob Kern	2,634	13.8
Democratic	Douglas M. Carpenter	1,837	9.6
Total votes		19,114	100.0

=== General election ===
==== Endorsements ====
Joe Bock (D)

Organizations

- Democratic Congressional Campaign Committee "Emerging Races" Program

==== Predictions ====
Source	Ranking	As of
The Cook Political Report	Safe R	November 3, 2014
Rothenberg	Safe R	October 24, 2014
Sabato's Crystal Ball	Likely R	October 30, 2014
RCP	Likely R	November 2, 2014
Daily Kos Elections	Safe R	November 4, 2014

==== Results ====
Indiana's 2nd congressional district, 2014
Party	Candidate	Votes	%
Republican	Jackie Walorski (incumbent)	85,583	58.9
Democratic	Joe Bock	55,590	38.3
Libertarian	Jeff Petermann	4,027	2.8
Total votes		145,200	100.0
Republican hold			

== District 3 ==
2014 Indiana's 3rd congressional district election

Nominee	Marlin Stutzman	Justin Kuhnle
Party	Republican	Democratic
Popular vote	102,889	39,771
Percentage	69.2%	26.7%
- County results Stutzman: 60–70% 70–80% 80–90%
U.S. Representative before election
Marlin Stutzman
Republican
Elected U.S. Representative
Marlin Stutzman
Republican

Incumbent Republican Marlin Stutzman, who had represented the 3rd district since 2010, ran for re-election.

=== Republican primary ===
==== Candidates ====
===== Nominee =====
- Marlin Stutzman, incumbent U.S. Representative

===== Eliminated in primary =====
- Mark Baringer
- James Mahoney, former delegate to the Republican State Convention

==== Primary results ====
Republican primary results
Party	Candidate	Votes	%
Republican	Marlin Stutzman (incumbent)	48,837	81.7
Republican	Mark William Baringer	5,868	9.8
Republican	James E. Mahoney III	5,094	8.5
Total votes		59,799	100.0

=== Democratic primary ===
==== Candidates ====
===== Nominee =====
- Justin Kuhnle, family case manager and candidate for this seat in 2012

===== Eliminated in primary =====
- Jim Redmond
- Tommy Schrader, candidate for this seat in 2012

==== Primary results ====
Democratic primary results
Party	Candidate	Votes	%
Democratic	Justin Kuhnle	2,893	34.9
Democratic	Tommy A. Schrader	2,805	33.8
Democratic	Jim Redmond	2,597	31.3
Total votes		8,295	100.0

=== General election ===
==== Predictions ====
Source	Ranking	As of
The Cook Political Report	Safe R	November 3, 2014
Rothenberg	Safe R	October 24, 2014
Sabato's Crystal Ball	Safe R	October 30, 2014
RCP	Safe R	November 2, 2014
Daily Kos Elections	Safe R	November 4, 2014

==== Results ====
Indiana's 3rd congressional district, 2014
Party	Candidate	Votes	%
Republican	Marlin Stutzman (incumbent)	102,889	69.2
Democratic	Justin Kuhnle	39,771	26.7
Libertarian	Scott Wise	6,113	4.1
Total votes		148,773	100.0
Republican hold			

== District 4 ==
2014 Indiana's 4th congressional district election
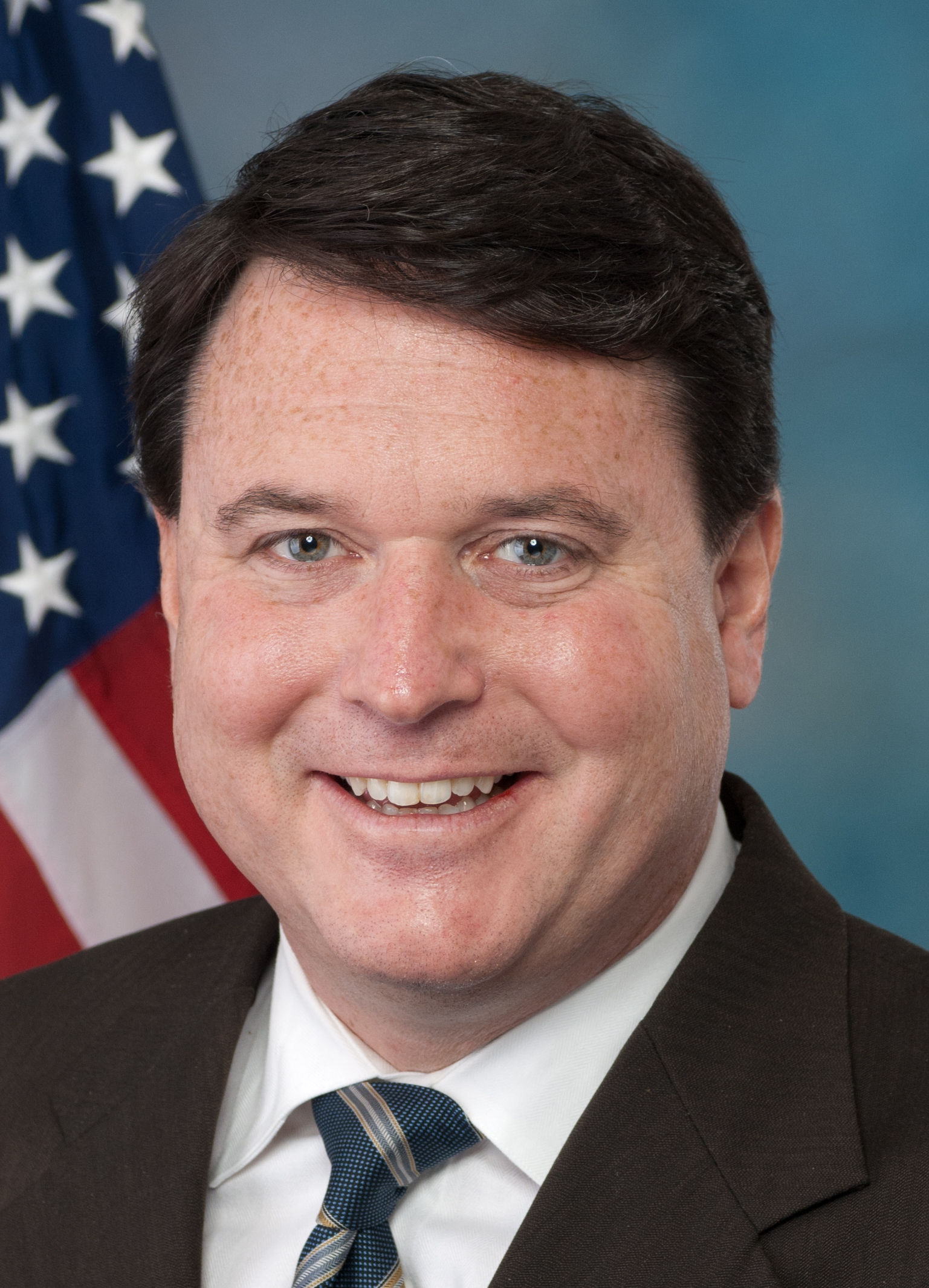

Nominee	Todd Rokita	John Dale
Party	Republican	Democratic
Popular vote	94,998	47,056
Percentage	66.9%	33.1%
- County results Rokita: 50–60% 60–70% 70–80%
U.S. Representative before election
Todd Rokita
Republican
Elected U.S. Representative
Todd Rokita
Republican

Incumbent Republican Todd Rokita, who had represented the 4th district since 2011, ran for re-election.

=== Republican primary ===
==== Candidates ====
===== Nominee =====
- Todd Rokita, incumbent U.S. Representative

===== Eliminated in primary =====
- Kevin Grant, Army National Guard member

==== Primary results ====
Republican primary results
Party	Candidate	Votes	%
Republican	Todd Rokita (incumbent)	43,179	71.2
Republican	Kevin J. Grant	17,472	28.8
Total votes		60,651	100.0

=== Democratic primary ===
==== Candidates ====
===== Nominee =====
- John Dale, teacher

===== Eliminated in primary =====
- Jeffrey Blaydes
- Roger Day
- John Futrell
- Howard Pollchi

==== Primary results ====
Democratic primary results
Party	Candidate	Votes	%
Democratic	John Dale	3,742	42.2
Democratic	Roger D. Day	2,266	25.5
Democratic	Jeffrey Oliver Blaydes	1,332	15.0
Democratic	Howard Joseph Pollchik	778	8.8
Democratic	John L. Futrell	754	8.5
Total votes		8,872	100.0

=== General election ===
==== Predictions ====
Source	Ranking	As of
The Cook Political Report	Safe R	November 3, 2014
Rothenberg	Safe R	October 24, 2014
Sabato's Crystal Ball	Safe R	October 30, 2014
RCP	Safe R	November 2, 2014
Daily Kos Elections	Safe R	November 4, 2014

==== Results ====
Indiana's 4th congressional district, 2014
Party	Candidate	Votes	%
Republican	Todd Rokita (Incumbent)	94,998	66.9
Democratic	John Dale	47,056	33.1
Total votes		142,054	100.0
Republican hold			

== District 5 ==
2014 Indiana's 5th congressional district election
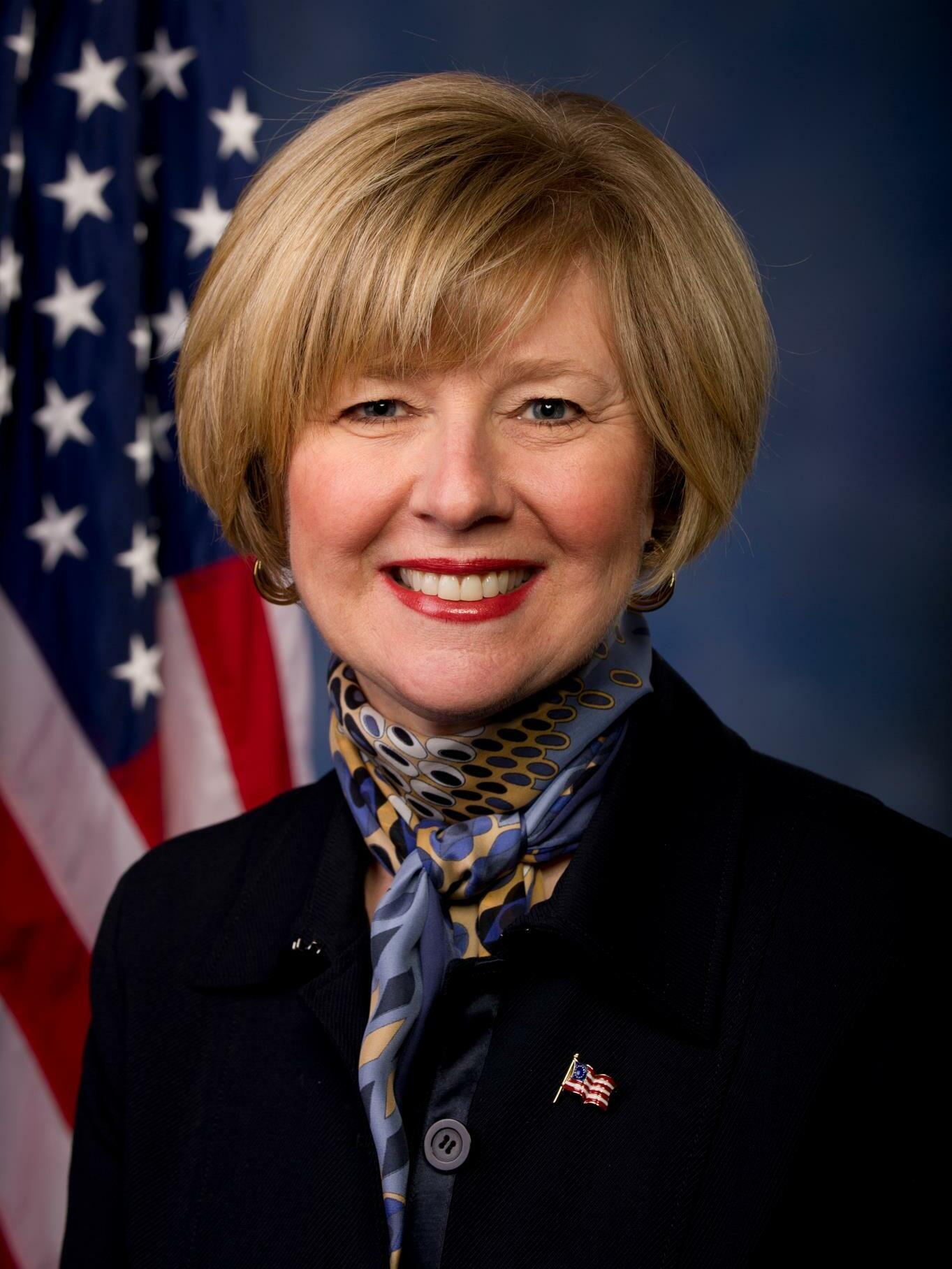

Nominee	Susan Brooks	Shawn Denney
Party	Republican	Democratic
Popular vote	105,277	49,756
Percentage	65.2%	30.8%
- County results Brooks: 50–60% 60–70% 70–80%
U.S. Representative before election
Susan Brooks
Republican
Elected U.S. Representative
Susan Brooks
Republican

Incumbent Republican Susan Brooks, who had represented the 5th district since 2013, ran for re-election.

=== Republican primary ===
==== Candidates ====
===== Nominee =====
- Susan Brooks, incumbent U.S. Representative

===== Eliminated in primary =====
- David Campbell
- David Stockdale, independent insurance broker

==== Primary results ====
Republican primary results
Party	Candidate	Votes	%
Republican	Susan Brooks (incumbent)	34,996	72.7
Republican	David S. Stockdale	7,327	15.2
Republican	David M. Campbell	5,790	12.1
Total votes		48,113	100.0

=== Democratic primary ===
==== Candidates ====
===== Nominee =====
- Shawn Denney, teacher

===== Eliminated in primary =====
- Allen Davidson, engineer
- David Ford, U.S. Air Force Battlefield weather forecaster

==== Primary results ====
Democratic primary results
Party	Candidate	Votes	%
Democratic	Shawn A. Denney	6,141	41.9
Democratic	David William Ford	4,856	33.1
Democratic	Allen Ray Davidson	3,660	25.0
Total votes		14,657	100.0

=== General election ===
==== Predictions ====
Source	Ranking	As of
The Cook Political Report	Safe R	November 3, 2014
Rothenberg	Safe R	October 24, 2014
Sabato's Crystal Ball	Safe R	October 30, 2014
RCP	Safe R	November 2, 2014
Daily Kos Elections	Safe R	November 4, 2014

==== Results ====
Indiana's 5th congressional district, 2014
Party	Candidate	Votes	%
Republican	Susan Brooks (incumbent)	105,277	65.2
Democratic	Shawn Denney	49,756	30.8
Libertarian	John Krom	6,407	4.0
Total votes		161,440	100.0
Republican hold			

== District 6 ==
2014 Indiana's 6th congressional district election
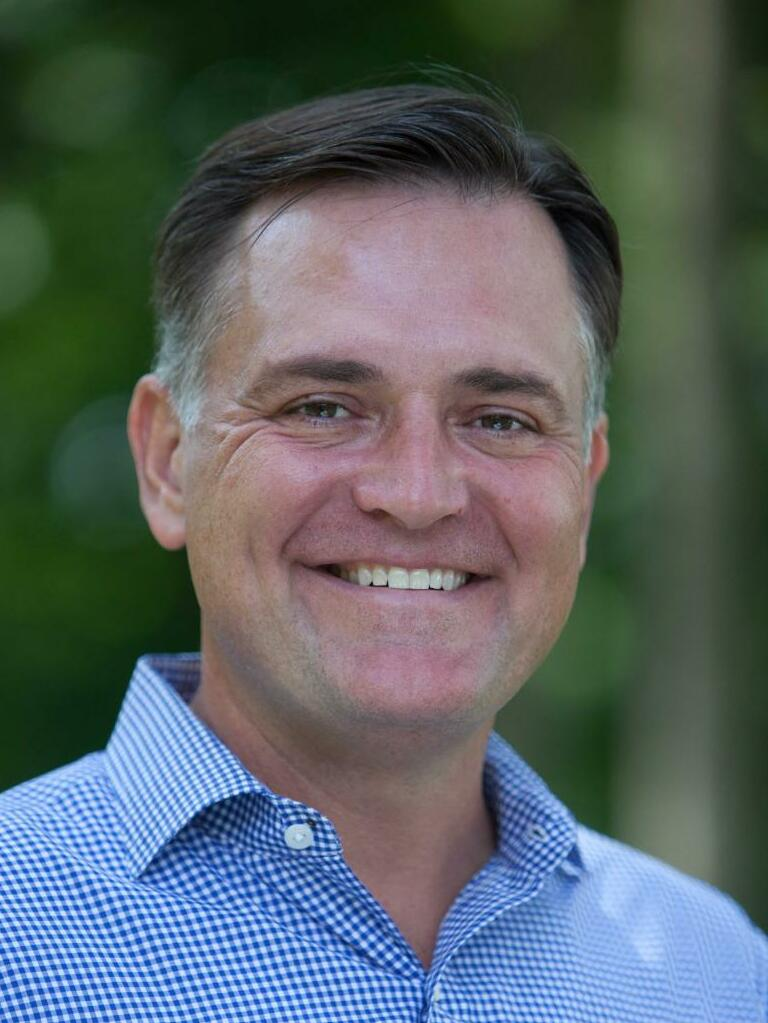

Nominee	Luke Messer	Susan Hall Heitzman
Party	Republican	Democratic
Popular vote	102,187	45,509
Percentage	65.9%	29.4%
- County results Messer: 50–60% 60–70% 70–80% Heitzman: 50–60%
U.S. Representative before election
Luke Messer
Republican
Elected U.S. Representative
Luke Messer
Republican

Incumbent Republican Luke Messer, who had represented the 6th district since 2013, ran for re-election.

=== Republican primary ===
==== Candidates ====
===== Nominee =====
- Luke Messer, incumbent U.S. Representative

==== Primary results ====
Republican primary results
Party	Candidate	Votes	%
Republican	Luke Messer (incumbent)	49,094	100.0

=== Democratic primary ===
==== Candidates ====
===== Nominee =====
- Susan Heitzman, small business owner and candidate for this seat in 2012

===== Eliminated in primary =====
- Lane Siekman, attorney
- Corrine Westerfield

==== Primary results ====
Democratic primary results
Party	Candidate	Votes	%
Democratic	Susan Hall Heitzman	9,078	48.3
Democratic	Lane Siekman	5,574	29.6
Democratic	Corrine Nicole Westerfield	4,151	22.1
Total votes		18,803	100.0

=== General election ===
==== Predictions ====
Source	Ranking	As of
The Cook Political Report	Safe R	November 3, 2014
Rothenberg	Safe R	October 24, 2014
Sabato's Crystal Ball	Safe R	October 30, 2014
RCP	Safe R	November 2, 2014
Daily Kos Elections	Safe R	November 4, 2014

==== Results ====
Indiana's 6th congressional district, 2014
Party	Candidate	Votes	%
Republican	Luke Messer (incumbent)	102,187	65.9
Democratic	Susan Hall Heitzman	45,509	29.4
Libertarian	Eric Miller	7,375	4.7
Total votes		155,071	100.0
Republican hold			

== District 7 ==
2014 Indiana's 7th congressional district election
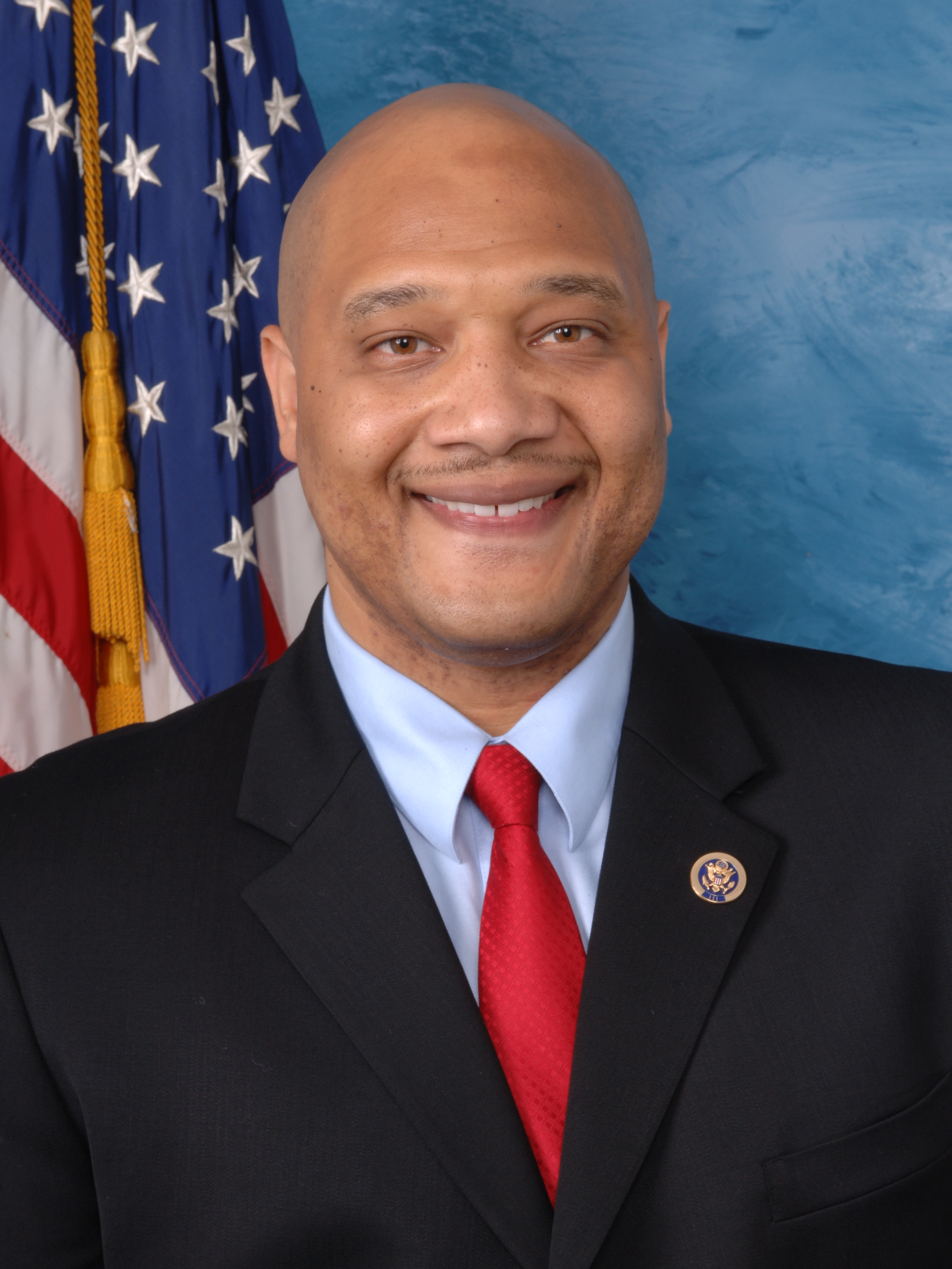

Nominee	André Carson	Catherine Ping
Party	Democratic	Republican
Popular vote	61,443	46,887
Percentage	54.7%	41.8%
- County results Carson: 50–60%
U.S. Representative before election
André Carson
Democratic
Elected U.S. Representative
André Carson
Democratic

Incumbent Democrat André Carson, who had represented the 7th district since 2008, ran for re-election.

=== Democratic primary ===
==== Candidates ====
===== Nominee =====
- André Carson, incumbent U.S. Representative

===== Eliminated in primary =====
- Mmoja Ajabu
- Curtis Godfrey
- Pierre Pullins

==== Primary results ====
Democratic primary results
Party	Candidate	Votes	%
Democratic	André Carson (incumbent)	19,446	89.1
Democratic	Curtis Godfrey	1,209	5.5
Democratic	Mmoja Ajabu	782	3.6
Democratic	Pierre Quincy Pullins	390	1.8
Total votes		21,827	100.0

=== Republican primary ===
==== Candidates ====
===== Nominee =====
- Catherine Ping, Army Reserve Lieutenant Colonel, business owner and candidate for this seat in 2012

===== Eliminated in primary =====
- Wayne Harmon, parole agent
- J.D. Miniear, Christian ministry outreach and candidate for this seat in 2012
- Erin Magee
- Gordon Smith, Indiana Army National Guard Coordinator

==== Primary results ====
Republican primary results
Party	Candidate	Votes	%
Republican	Catherine Ping	4,882	35.1
Republican	Wayne "Gunny" Harmon	3,258	23.4
Republican	J.D. Miniear	2,840	20.4
Republican	Gordon Smith	1,872	13.5
Republican	Erin Kent Magee	1,057	7.6
Total votes		13,909	100.0

=== General election ===
==== Predictions ====
Source	Ranking	As of
The Cook Political Report	Safe D	November 3, 2014
Rothenberg	Safe D	October 24, 2014
Sabato's Crystal Ball	Safe D	October 30, 2014
RCP	Safe D	November 2, 2014
Daily Kos Elections	Safe D	November 4, 2014

==== Results ====
Indiana's 7th congressional district, 2014
Party	Candidate	Votes	%
Democratic	Andre Carson (incumbent)	61,443	54.7
Republican	Catherine Ping	46,887	41.8
Libertarian	Chris Mayo	3,931	3.5
Total votes		112,261	100.0
Democratic hold			

== District 8 ==
2014 Indiana's 8th congressional district election
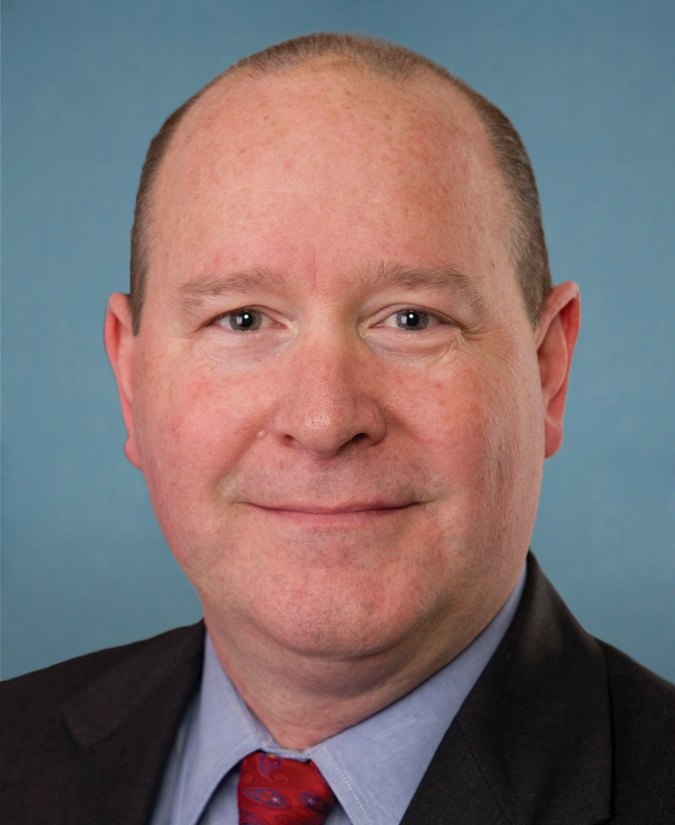

Nominee	Larry Bucshon	Tom Spangler
Party	Republican	Democratic
Popular vote	103,344	61,384
Percentage	60.3%	35.8%
- County results Bucshon: 40–50% 50–60% 60–70% 70–80% Spangler: 50–60%
U.S. Representative before election
Larry Bucshon
Republican
Elected U.S. Representative
Larry Bucshon
Republican

Incumbent Republican Larry Bucshon, who had represented the 8th district since 2011, ran for re-election.

=== Republican primary ===
==== Candidates ====
===== Nominee =====
- Larry Bucshon, incumbent U.S. Representative

===== Eliminated in primary =====
- Andrew McNeil

==== Primary results ====
Republican primary results
Party	Candidate	Votes	%
Republican	Larry Bucshon (incumbent)	30,967	74.8
Republican	Andrew T. McNeil	10,405	25.2
Total votes		41,372	100.0

=== Democratic primary ===
==== Candidates ====
===== Nominee =====
- Tom Spangler

===== Declined =====
- Dave Crooks, former state representative and nominee for this seat in 2012

==== Primary results ====
Democratic primary results
Party	Candidate	Votes	%
Democratic	Tom Spangler	23,055	100.0

=== General election ===
==== Predictions ====
Source	Ranking	As of
The Cook Political Report	Safe R	November 3, 2014
Rothenberg	Safe R	October 24, 2014
Sabato's Crystal Ball	Safe R	October 30, 2014
RCP	Safe R	November 2, 2014
Daily Kos Elections	Safe R	November 4, 2014

==== Results ====
Indiana's 8th congressional district, 2014
Party	Candidate	Votes	%
Republican	Larry Bucshon (incumbent)	103,344	60.3
Democratic	Tom Spangler	61,384	35.8
Libertarian	Andrew Horning	6,587	3.9
Total votes		171,315	100.0
Republican hold			

== District 9 ==
2014 Indiana's 9th congressional district election
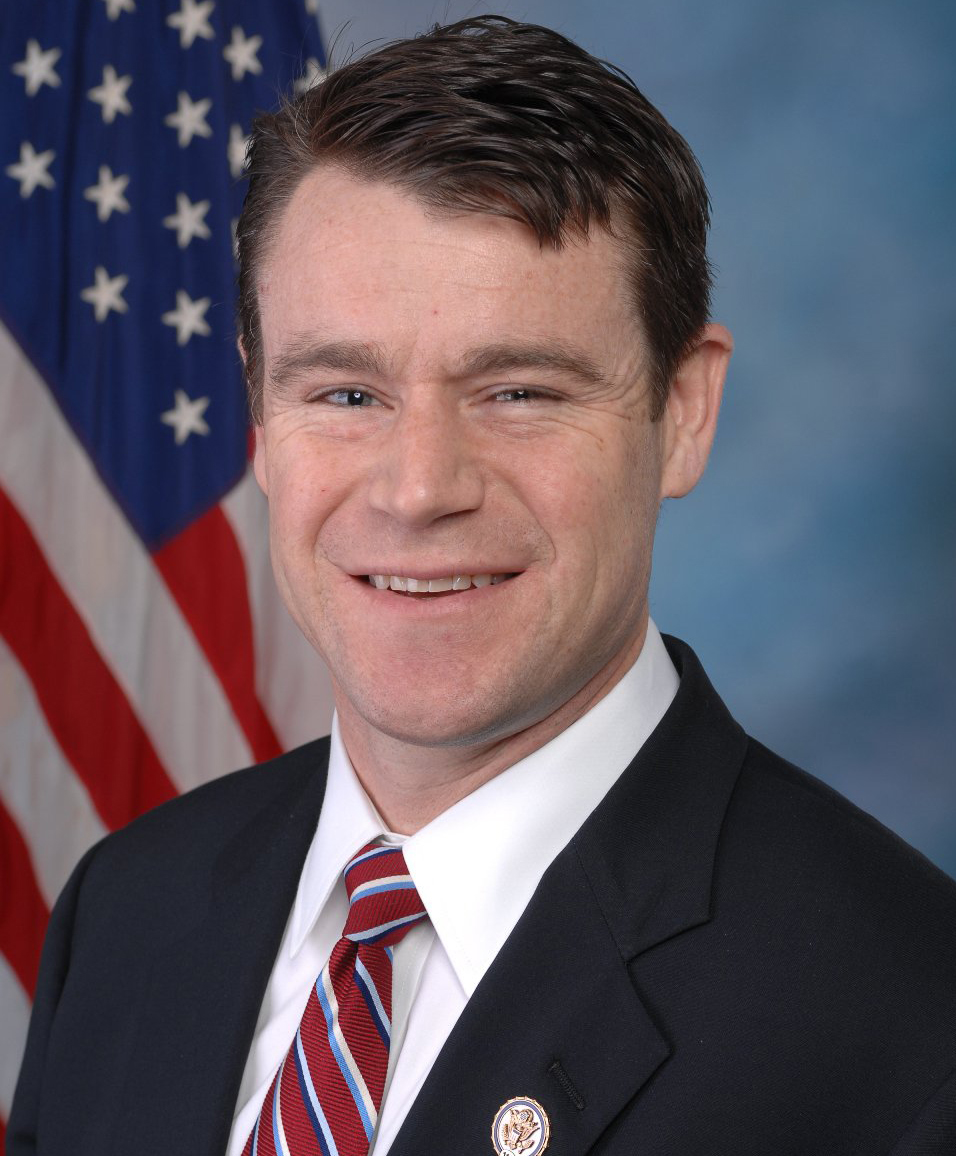

Nominee	Todd Young	Bill Bailey
Party	Republican	Democratic
Popular vote	101,594	55,016
Percentage	62.2%	33.7%
- County results Young: 50–60% 60–70% 70–80% Bailey: 50–60%
U.S. Representative before election
Todd Young
Republican
Elected U.S. Representative
Todd Young
Republican

Incumbent Republican Todd Young, who had represented the 9th district since 2011, ran for re-election.

=== Republican primary ===
==== Candidates ====
===== Nominee =====
- Todd Young, incumbent U.S. Representative

===== Eliminated in primary =====
- Kathy Heil
- Mark Jones

==== Primary results ====
Republican primary results
Party	Candidate	Votes	%
Republican	Todd Young (incumbent)	30,402	79.4
Republican	Kathy Lowe Heil	4,607	12.0
Republican	Mark G. Jones	3,293	8.6
Total votes		38,302	100.0

=== Democratic primary ===
==== Candidates ====
===== Nominee =====
- Bill Bailey, former state representative and former mayor of Seymour

===== Eliminated in primary =====
- James McClure Jr.
- J.S. Miller
- William Thomas

===== Declined =====
- Shelli Yoder, Monroe County Council member and nominee for this seat in 2012

==== Primary results ====
Democratic primary results
Party	Candidate	Votes	%
Democratic	Bill Bailey	10,392	45.4
Democratic	James R. McClure, Jr.	5,733	25.0
Democratic	J.S. Miller	3,559	15.6
Democratic	William Joseph Thomas	3,206	14.0
Total votes		22,890	100.0

=== General election ===
==== Predictions ====
Source	Ranking	As of
The Cook Political Report	Safe R	November 3, 2014
Rothenberg	Safe R	October 24, 2014
Sabato's Crystal Ball	Safe R	October 30, 2014
RCP	Safe R	November 2, 2014
Daily Kos Elections	Safe R	November 4, 2014

==== Results ====
Indiana's 9th congressional district, 2014
Party	Candidate	Votes	%
Republican	Todd Young (incumbent)	101,594	62.2
Democratic	Bill Bailey	55,016	33.7
Libertarian	Ralph Mike Frey	5,777	4.1
Total votes		162,387	100.0
Republican hold			

== See also ==
- 2014 United States House of Representatives elections
- 2014 United States elections
