= Potato Creek State Park =

State park in Indiana, United States

- Location within Indiana Location within the United States
- Location: St. Joseph County, Indiana, USA
- Nearest city: North Liberty, Indiana
- Coordinates: 41°33′09″N 86°20′53″W
- Area: 3,840 acres (1,550 ha)
- Created: June 6, 1977
- Operator: Indiana Department of Natural Resources
- Visitors: 572,183 (in 2018–2019)
- Website: Official website

Potato Creek State Park is an Indiana state park located in north-central part of the U.S. state of Indiana about 12 miles (19 km) southwest of South Bend. Potato Creek is open year-round and supports various activities and facilities, including fishing, hiking, camping and mountain biking. Natural habitats include the 327-acre (1.3 km^{2}) Worster Lake, old fields, mature woodlands, restored prairies, and diverse restored wetlands. Each offers different opportunities for plant and wildlife observation. The northeast corner has been designated "Swamp Rose Nature Preserve"; now about 1 square mile is either wetlands or in Worster Lake. Potato Creek receives about 570,000 visitors annually.

== History ==
Native Americans hunted and fished in the area, as well as collected tubers known as "wild potatoes" from the creek banks. In the 1830s, after the Indian Removal Act of 1830 and various treaties as well as forced migrations, settlers cut the forests and wetlands and turned them into agricultural fields. Several dams were constructed on Potato Creek in order to power mills. Some early settlers are buried at the Porter Cemetery near the modern park's center. The area also had an African American settlement before and after the American Civil War.

About a century after the area was converted into farmland (and as many fields were becoming less productive), Darcy Worster began re-creating natural areas, as well as lobbying to dam the creek to create a reservoir for fishing and recreation activities. He often sent hand-crafted insects to "bug" state legislators. Although his efforts were interrupted by World War II, the reservoir was created in 1977 and the resulting lake is named after him.

Indiana Governor Otis R. Bowen dedicated six square miles as Potato Creek Recreation Area on June 6, 1977. Dairy farmer and 32-year state Representative Dick Mangus helped oversee the upgrade to state park status in 1983. Mangus had begun his political career when part of his family's long time dairy farm was taken during expansion of U.S. Route 31; the section adjoining the park was later renamed in his honor.

In 2006, the area was internationally designated as an important bird area, due to the migratory birds which visit, as well as native resident birds including osprey and wild turkey as well as songbirds. As of 2006, some have advocated building a lodge within the park to supplement the campground store, similar to the lodges in seven other (but older) Indiana state parks.

As of 2025 the Lodge at Potato Creek State Park, the "first facility constructed from the ground up since 1939" at an Indiana state park, is under construction and is expected to open by 2027.

== Facilities ==
- Paved Bicycle Trail - 3.2 miles (5.1 km)
- Mountain Bike Trail - 6.6 miles (10.6 km)
- Hiking Trails
- Nature Center
- Wildlife Observation Area
- Cultural Arts Programs
- Picnicking
- Playground Equipment
- Swimming / Beach
- Fishing
- Fish Cleaning Station
- Shelter Reservations
- Boat Launch Ramps
- Boat (only Electric trolling motors)
- Bridle Trails
- Cabins / 17
- Camping - Reservations recommended
  - Class A - 287 sites
  - Horsemen's Class A - 70 sites
  - Youth Tent Areas
- Camp Store
- Dumping Station
- Winter Activities
  - Tubing Hill
  - Cross-country skiing
  - Ice fishing

== Equipment rentals ==
- Bicycle
- Paddleboat
- Rowboat
- Kayak
- Canoe
- Recreation Building
