= Richard W. Mangus =

American politician

Dick Mangus

Member of the Indiana House of Representatives from the 10th (southern St. Joseph County) district
- In office 1973–1982
- Preceded by: Clayton Joseph ("Joe") Barber

Member of the Indiana House of Representatives from the 6th (southern St. Joseph and northern Marshall Counties) district
- In office 1983–1992

Member of the Indiana House of Representatives from the 21st (southern St. Joseph and Elkhart Counties) district
- In office 1992–2004
- Succeeded by: Jackie Walorski

Personal details
- Born: Richard W. Mangus; July 23, 1930 Lakeville, Indiana, U.S.
- Died: February 4, 2008 (aged 77) South Bend, Indiana, U.S.
- Party: Republican
- Spouse: Mary Elizabeth Annis
- Education: Purdue University
- Occupation: Dairy and grain farmer, truck driver, politician

Richard W. Mangus (July 23, 1930 - February 4, 2008) was an Indiana dairy and grain farmer, professional truck driver and for 32 years a Republican member of the Indiana House of Representatives.

== Early and family life ==
Mangus was born during the Great Depression to Walter Mangus and his wife Betty (the former Elizabeth Deck). He attended the local Lakeville public schools and graduated from Lakeville High School in 1948. He then attended Purdue University and graduated in 1951. Mangus also served in the Indiana National Guard from 1947 to 1956.

== Career ==
Mangus's initial career was in the family dairy farming business, Mangus Dairy Farms. He became the president of LaVille Farms, Inc. as well as a director of Mangus Dairy Farms, Inc. Related activities included the Pure Milk Association (including as secretary-treasurer), the local Farm Bureau, American Milk Producers Association and St. Joseph County Extension Advisory Board. He was also a professional truck driver.

After part of his family's farm was taken during expansion of U.S. Route 31, Mangus became politically active, especially in the local Union Township Republican Party. He became a Republican state convention delegate in 1964 and 1966.

During the Republican landslide of November, 1972, Mangus defeated three-term Democrat Clayton Joseph "Joe" Barber (1917- , a Navy veteran, machinist and realtor) to become the delegate from southern St. Joseph County (then district 10) in the Indiana House of Representatives. Mangus won re-election many times, and ran unopposed during the last several elections, before announcing his decision not to run again because of ongoing health issues. He rose to become the chairman and/or ranking member (leader of the legislative minority) of the House Environmental Affairs Committee, the Constitutional Law Committee, and the Elections and Reapportionment Committee. He also served on the House Human Affairs Committee and House Public Policy Committee. During his lifetime, Mangus received awards from the Fraternal Order of Police, Professional Firefighters, Soil and Water Conservation District and Junior Chamber of Commerce, among others.

Mangus became known for his advocacy of environmental causes, particularly the creation of Potato Creek State Park in 1977 with the help of Indiana Governor Otis Bowen (a fellow Republican from the next district who briefly became a constituent in a later reapportionment). Mangus helped oversee Potato Creek's upgrade to full state park status in 1983. He also served on the Department of Natural Resources Commission

Although an "ordinary guy", Mangus also became known for his knowledge of parliamentary procedure, in particular for proposing a final amendment to strip prior approved small amendments and return a bill to its original form, which some called the "Mangus Maneuver". In 1995, Mangus used the opposite maneuver to block proposed reform of Indiana's time zone problem through "silly" amendments. After Mangus declined to run for re-election in 2004, fellow Republican Jackie Walorski (from neighboring Elkhart County, part of which became within Mangus' district following the reapportionment after the 1990 census) succeeded him, and would also serve multiple terms in the Indiana House before eventually winning election to the U.S. House of Representatives.

== Personal life ==
In 1951 Mangus married Mary Elizabeth Annis (his death ended their 56-year marriage), and they had five children. He was also active in 4-H Clubs, Toastmasters International, Freemasons, Lions Club and (like his German ancestors) the Church of the Brethren.

== Death and legacy ==
Mangus died of a heart attack on February 4, 2008, at Memorial Hospital in South Bend, St. Joseph County, Indiana (long a part of his district and which treated him in his later years for diabetes). Many Indiana legislators of both parties attended his funeral at the County Line Brethren Church (of which he had served as lay Moderator and assistant Moderator). During his life, Mangus thrice won the Sagamore of the Wabash award (Indiana's highest honor). He is interred at Fair Cemetery in North Liberty, Indiana.

Indiana Route 31 near Potato Creek State Park and Lakeville is named in his honor. Potato Creek State Park displays a plaque and an explanatory marker near its entrance noting his role in the park's founding.
