= Ron Drake =

American politician

Member of the Indiana House of Representatives from Clay County and Sullivan County
- In office November 7, 1962 – November 9, 1966
- Preceded by: Joe Arthur Harris
- Succeeded by: Frederick Taggart Bauer

Personal details
- Born: September 26, 1937 (age 88)

Ronald Lee Drake (born September 26, 1937) is an American politician from the state of Indiana. He served in the Indiana House of Representatives for two terms from 1963 to 1967. He was a candidate for the United States House of Representatives for Indiana's 8th congressional district in the 2016 elections and again in the 2020 election.
