= Joe Bock (academic) =

American politician and academic

Member of the Missouri House of Representatives
- In office 1986–1992

Personal details
- Born: Joseph G. Bock; October 18, 1957 (age 68)
- Party: Democratic
- Spouse: Susan Lyke
- Children: 2
- Education: University of Missouri (BSW, MSW); American University (PhD)
- Profession: Professor

Joseph G. Bock is an American academic and politician, who is currently a professor with Kennesaw State University's Department of Political Science and International Affairs. A member of the Democratic Party, Bock served in the Missouri House of Representatives from 1986 to 1992 and was his party's nominee against Jackie Walorski in 2014.

Bock then directed Catholic Relief Services programs in Haiti, Bosnia, Thailand, and other countries and served as Vice President of the American Refugee Committee.

After challenging Congresswoman Jackie Walorski in the 2014 elections, Bock left his position as director of global health training for Notre Dame's Eck Institute for Global Health to accept a position as the director of the International Conflict Management program at Kennesaw State University, where he has been since August 2015.

== Academic career ==
Dr. Bock holds bachelor's and master's degrees in Social Work from the University of Missouri-Columbia and a PhD from the School of International Service of American University.

Bock researches in the area of violence prevention, and has published three books.

His humanitarian work has included directing Catholic Relief Services’ programs in Pakistan and Jerusalem/West Bank/Gaza Strip, and overseeing programs in Bosnia, Croatia, Guinea, Iraq, Kosovo, Liberia, Macedonia, Montenegro, Pakistan, Rwanda, Serbia, Sierra Leone, Thailand, and Uganda while serving as vice president at American Refugee Committee. In 2010, he took a two-month leave from Notre Dame to serve as American Refugee Committee's country director in Haiti following its devastating earthquake.

Dr. Bock served as a panelist for InterAction in Washington, DC about international issues facing Internally Displaced Persons. He served as a consultant with The Asia Foundation on conflict management and democratic governance, providing support in Thailand, Nepal, and Sri Lanka, where he worked on a conflict early warning and early response program of the Foundation for Co-Existence (Colombo, Sri Lanka), which formed the basis of his book The Technology of Nonviolence: Social Media and Violence Prevention, which was published by MIT Press in 2012. He is the author of two other books.

In December 2015, Dr. Bock was provided a 42-day Fulbright Specialist award to work with the Municipality of Athens, Greece on the migrant crisis. He has been a Fellow with the W.K. Kellogg Foundation, a Fulbright Specialist at University of Malta, and a visiting fellow at Gonzaga University, as well as a member of the Working Group on Reconciliation of Caritas Internationalis, based in Vatican City.

Dr. Bock is on the Advisory Council of the War Prevention Initiative of the Jubitz Family Foundation and is a member of the Advisory Committee of the Center of Conflict Studies, Middlebury Institute of International Studies at Monterey. Dr. Bock is an editorial adviser to Development in Practice, a peer-reviewed journal founded by Oxfam Great Britain. He has authored or co-authored articles in various peer-reviewed journals including, among others, Political Geography, Information Technology for Development, Journal of Peace Research, Journal of Information Technology & Politics, and Journal of Refugee Studies.

According to Union Institute and University and Kennesaw State University, Bock also served as director of External Relations at the Kroc Institute for International Peace Studies at University of Notre Dame, taught at University of Notre Dame, Monterey Institute for International Studies, Hebrew University, Eastern Mennonite University, and William Jewell College. He has also held leadership positions with the Center for Peace and Global Citizenship at Haverford College, the Secure World Foundation, Notre Dame's Eck Institute for Global Health and Kennesaw State University's International Conflict Management program.

He is now Executive Director of Bethlehem University Foundation.

== Political career ==
Bock served six years in the Missouri House of Representatives, with leadership positions as Chair of the Energy and Environment Committee and vice-chair of the Commerce Committee.

In 2014, Bock ran for Congress in Indiana's 2nd congressional district against the incumbent, Republican Jackie Walorski. Bock won the Democratic nomination, but was defeated by Walorski in the general election.
