= Jackie Walorski =

American politician (1963–2022)

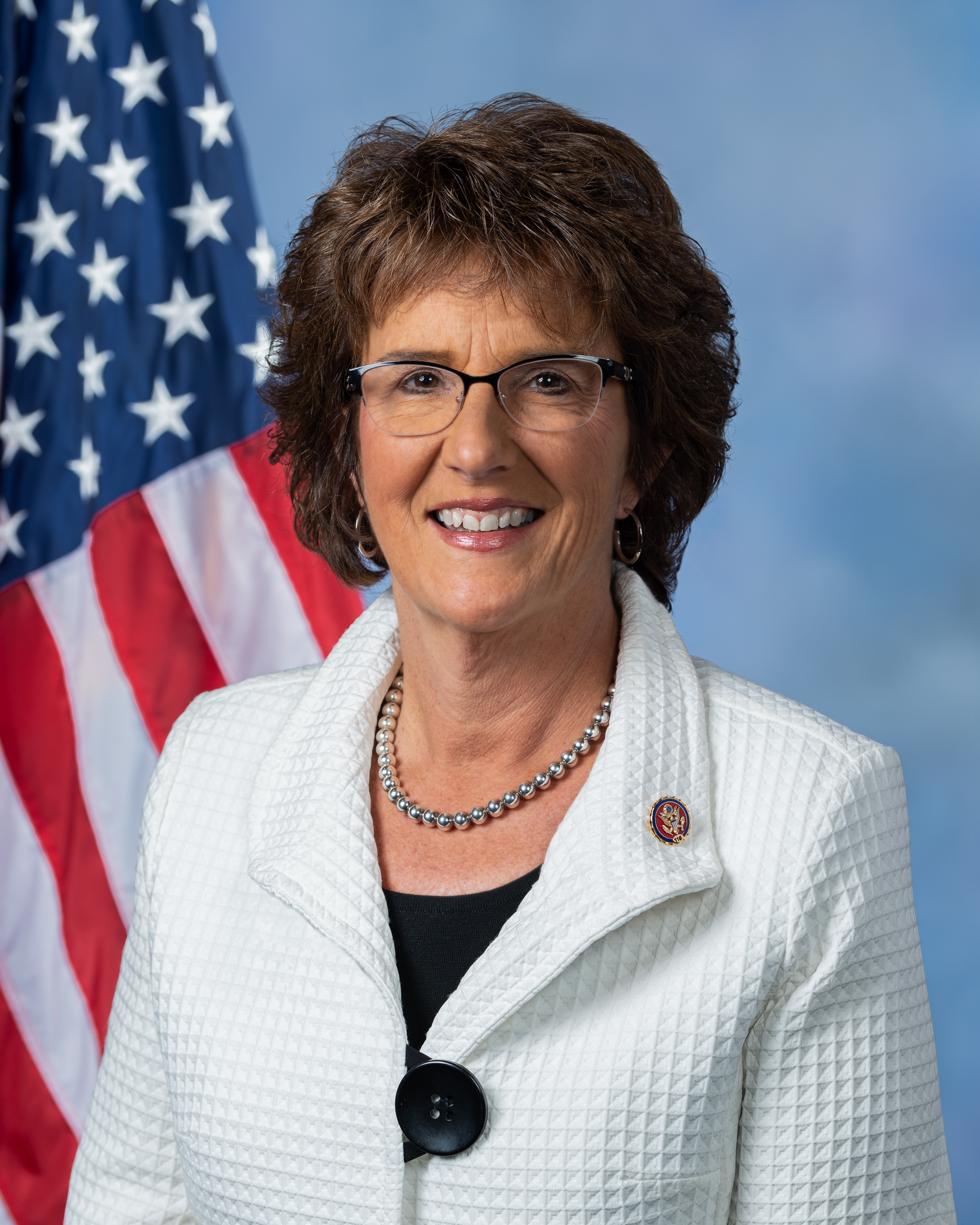
- Official portrait, 2020

Ranking Member of the House Ethics Committee
- In office January 3, 2021 – August 3, 2022
- Preceded by: Kenny Marchant
- Succeeded by: Michael Guest (acting)

Member of the U.S. House of Representatives from Indiana's 2nd district
- In office January 3, 2013 – August 3, 2022
- Preceded by: Joe Donnelly
- Succeeded by: Rudy Yakym

Member of the Indiana House of Representatives from the 21st district
- In office January 5, 2005 – November 16, 2010
- Preceded by: Richard W. Mangus
- Succeeded by: Timothy Wesco

Personal details
- Born: August 17, 1963 South Bend, Indiana, U.S.
- Died: August 3, 2022 (aged 58) Union Township, Indiana, U.S.
- Party: Republican
- Spouse: Dean Swihart (m. 1995)
- Education: Liberty University (attended); Taylor University (BA)
- Walorski's voice Walorski supporting the USMCA. Recorded December 19, 2019

Jacqueline Renae Walorski (/wəˈlɔːrski/, August 17, 1963 – August 3, 2022) was an American politician who served as the U.S. representative for Indiana's 2nd congressional district from 2013 until her death in 2022. She was a member of the Republican Party. Walorski served in the Indiana House of Representatives, representing Indiana's 21st district, from 2005 to 2010. In 2010, she won the Republican nomination for Indiana's 2nd congressional district, but narrowly lost the general election to Democratic incumbent Joe Donnelly. Walorski won the seat in 2012 after Donnelly vacated it to run for the U.S. Senate, and was reelected four times.

== Early life and education ==
Born in South Bend, Indiana, on August 17, 1963, Walorski grew up with her two older brothers in the city's Gilmer Park neighborhood. Her mother, Martha C. (née Martin), worked as a meat cutter at a local grocery store, and her father, Raymond B. Walorski, worked as a firefighter and owned an appliance store. She had Polish and German ancestry. As a child, she attended Hay Elementary School and graduated from Riley High School in 1981. She then attended Liberty Baptist College from 1981 to 1983, and graduated from Taylor University, receiving her Bachelor of Arts degree in communications and public administration in 1985.

== Early career ==
Walorski began her career as a television reporter for WSBT-TV, a CBS affiliate in South Bend, from 1985 to 1989, and was the executive director of the St. Joseph County Humane Society from 1989 to 1991. In 1991, she was appointed the director of institutional advancement at Ancilla College, a position she held until she was appointed the director of membership at the St. Joseph County Chamber of Commerce in 1996. She later worked as the director of annual giving at Indiana University South Bend from 1997 to 1999.

Walorski moved to Romania in 2000 and founded Impact International, a foundation to provide medical supplies and attention to impoverished children. She did Christian missionary work in Romania before returning to the U.S. in 2004.

== Indiana House of Representatives ==
=== Elections ===
In 2004, Walorski ran for a seat in the Indiana House of Representatives after incumbent Republican State Representative Richard W. Mangus decided to retire. She ran in Indiana's 2nd District, which included the suburban area between South Bend and Elkhart. Walorski defeated Democrat Carl H. Kaser, 64%–36%. In 2006, she won a second term with 53% of the vote. In 2008, she won a third term unopposed.

=== Tenure ===
During her tenure in the Indiana House, Walorski sponsored Indiana's Voter ID law, requiring voters to present government-issued identification during in-person voting. The voter ID law led to many lawsuits and was brought before the Supreme Court, where it was upheld in Crawford v. Marion County Election Board, and has been cited as helping the expansion of voter ID laws in other states.

Walorski was criticized for missing a committee vote and the opportunity for stopping the daylight saving time (DST) bill from passing out of committee, even though that bill died on the House floor. After a different bill passed introducing DST, she authored and introduced a bill to rescind DST, a measure that ended up dying.

Walorski authored legislation combating identity theft, including in 2006 when she sponsored a bill requiring companies to notify customers who are Indiana residents of any security breaches that could cause identity theft, identity deception, or fraud, making it a Class C felony and imposing a $50,000 fine on anyone who has the identities of over 100 persons. "Identity theft is the most rapidly growing crime in the United States. We need to find a solution to this problem before it gets any bigger in Indiana", she said.

Walorski became active in the caucus and was appointed Assistant Floor Leader. She served on the Family, Children, & Human Affairs and the Public Policy committees.

== U.S. House of Representatives ==
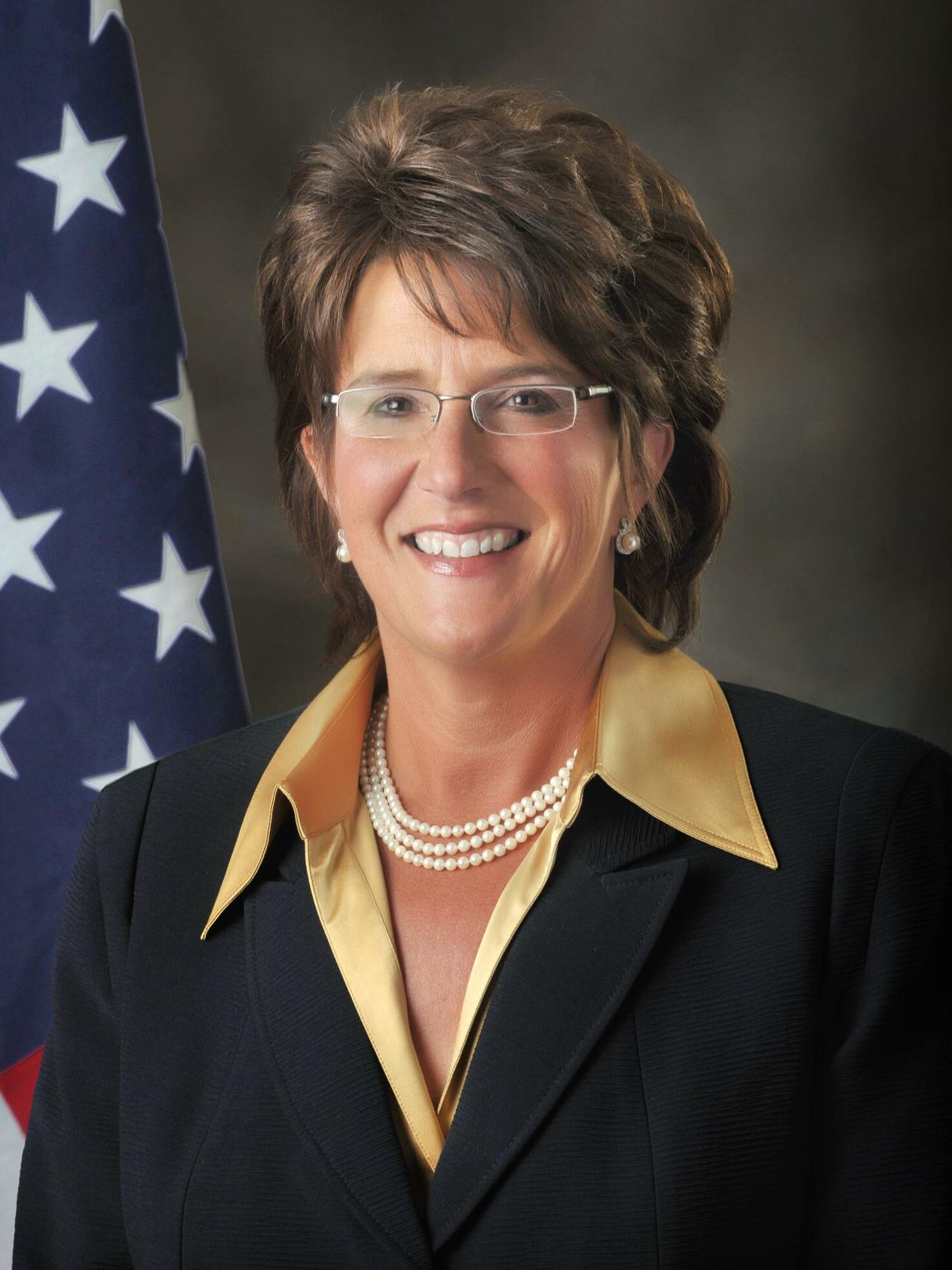
Walorski during the 113th Congress

In 2009, Walorski announced her candidacy to challenge incumbent Democratic U.S. Representative Joe Donnelly in Indiana's 2nd congressional district, and she won the 2010 Republican primary, with 61% of the votes, defeating Martin Dolan, Jack Jordan, and Tony Zirkle. She lost 48%–47% in the general election.

Within months of the general election, Walorski announced her plan to contest the seat again in 2012. During the Indiana legislature's 2011–2013 legislative session, the predominantly Republican Indiana House and Senate redrew Indiana's congressional districts. After redistricting, the newly drawn 2nd district included all of Elkhart County, Walorski's home county, and the demographics of the new district included more registered Republican voters. Had the district existed with these lines in 2008, Barack Obama would have won it by just 0.3 percentage points, 49.6% to John McCain's 49.3%. In contrast, he won the old 2nd with 54% of the vote.

Donnelly decided not to seek reelection, opting instead to run for the U.S. Senate. Walorski won the 2012 primary election with 73% of the vote, winning all ten counties in the 2nd District. In the general election, she faced Libertarian nominee Joe Ruiz of Mishawaka and Democratic nominee Brendan Mullen of Granger, an Iraq War veteran. Walorski defeated Mullen 49%–48%, likely helped by Republican presidential nominee Mitt Romney carrying her district with 56% of the vote. At the same time, Donnelly was elected to the Senate.

In 2014, while serving on the House Veterans Affairs Committee, Walorski was a leading voice pushing for the resignation of Eric Shinseki as Secretary of Veterans Affairs due to the Veterans Health Administration scandal of 2014.

Walorski voted against the second impeachment of Donald Trump and voted to object to the certification of the 2020 United States presidential election.

In 2019, Walorski was named the ranking member on the House Ways and Means Subcommittee on Worker and Family Support. In 2020, she was appointed to serve on the Select Subcommittee on the Coronavirus Crisis. In 2021, she became the ranking member on the House Ethics Committee.

Walorski won the uncontested 2022 Republican primary for the 2nd district.

=== Caucus memberships ===
- Veterinary Medicine Caucus
- U.S.-Japan Caucus
- Republican Study Committee

== Political positions ==
=== Defense ===
On May 25, 2018, Walorski introduced legislation to double the death gratuity the federal government pays to the families of service members killed on active duty. The legislation would have increased the death gratuity from $100,000 to $200,000. Under the bill, the government would have paid at least 60% of the benefit to the surviving spouse, and service members could have chosen how to disburse the remaining 40%. The bill also would have capped Congress members' death benefits at $74,000. The cap would have resulted in a payment of about $100,000 less than would be paid under the current system.

=== Health care ===
Walorski voted to repeal the Affordable Care Act, also known as Obamacare.

=== Economy ===
Walorski advocated privatizing Social Security. In March 2010, she said, "I think the one thing we have to do is the thing that Bush actually tried to do a couple years ago, which is privatize Social Security and allow people to invest in their own retirement."

Walorski voted for the Tax Cuts and Jobs Act of 2017.

In 2018, Walorski said she opposed the first Trump tariffs on goods imported from U.S. allies. She said that such duties threaten U.S. businesses and workers. These include a 25% tariff on steel and a 10% tariff on aluminum. Walorski also asked that the system for granting exclusions for certain products be accelerated.

=== Abortion ===
In 2013, Walorski expressed support for a ban on late-term abortions.

In 2015, Walorski raised objections to the Pain-Capable Unborn Child Protection Act, a bill banning late termination of pregnancy, an abortion procedure given beyond 20 weeks into a pregnancy. She had supported the 2013 version, but removed her name from the 2015 House bill in mid-January. The 2015 bill had an exemption for those seeking an abortion due to rape, but required that the person seeking the exemption report the rape to the police past 20 weeks. House Republicans canceled a planned vote shortly afterward due to opposition from Walorski and Representative Renee Ellmers, and other Republicans expressing concerns about the bill. A modified version of the bill was proposed in 2015, with modifications to remove the requirement to report a rape to the police. This version instead allowed abortions past 20 weeks in cases of rape, with the requirement that those pregnant due to rape would need to seek medical care or counseling before getting an abortion. Walorski voted for this version of the House bill in May. Walorski would also go on to vote for the 2017 version of the bill.

In October 2017, Walorski asked the Indiana State Department of Health to deny an application to open an abortion clinic in South Bend, saying the clinic would undermine efforts to reduce the number of abortions in the area.

=== Immigration ===
Walorski supported Trump's 2017 executive order to impose a temporary ban on entry to the U.S. for citizens of seven Muslim-majority countries, saying she believed it would "allow our national security officials to examine the vetting process and strengthen safeguards to prevent terrorists from entering our homeland."

=== Texas v. Pennsylvania ===
In December 2020, Walorski was one of 126 Republican members of the House of Representatives to sign an amicus brief in support of Texas v. Pennsylvania, a lawsuit filed at the United States Supreme Court contesting the results of the 2020 presidential election, in which Joe Biden defeated Donald Trump. The Supreme Court declined to hear the case on the basis that Texas lacked standing under Article III of the Constitution to challenge the results of an election held by another state.

== Personal life ==
In 1995, Walorski married Dean Swihart, a schoolteacher in Mishawaka. She resided in Jamestown, an unincorporated suburban community west of Elkhart, and was a member of South Gate Church, an Assemblies of God megachurch in South Bend.

== Death ==
On August 3, 2022, Walorski and three other people were killed in a head-on collision between two cars near Nappanee, Indiana. Walorski was returning from a ribbon-cutting ceremony in Claypool, Indiana. The collision occurred on State Road 19 near the intersection with State Road 119 between Nappanee and Wakarusa. The driver of the other vehicle, a Buick LeSabre, and the two other people in Walorski's vehicle, a Toyota RAV4, also died.

It was initially reported that a northbound vehicle on State Road 19 veered left and collided head-on with Walorski's vehicle, which was southbound; the police later retracted that statement and said that Walorski's northbound car, driven by her staffer, Zachery Potts, had crossed the center line for unknown reasons. The investigation concluded the following month, with the Elkhart County Sheriff's Office finding that Potts was at fault for the crash, with evidence showing he was likely attempting to overtake a flatbed truck.

House Speaker Nancy Pelosi ordered the flags around the U.S. Capitol Building to be flown at half-staff on the day of death and the day after in her honor. Transportation Secretary Pete Buttigieg, whose hometown of South Bend is in Walorski's district, posted condolences on Twitter, saying that "she was always prepared to work together where there was common ground". Former President Donald Trump eulogized her on his Truth Social platform, and President Joe Biden issued a statement saying that she was "respected by members of both parties" and offering condolences to the victims' families. On August 10, 2022, the Indiana congressional delegation introduced a bill to name the Department of Veteran Affairs Clinic in Mishawaka the Jackie Walorski VA Clinic. The bill, H.R. 8656, (Note: House Resolution 8656, 117th U.S. Congress) was signed into law September 30.

Walorski's funeral was held on August 11 at Granger Community Church in Granger, Indiana, and she is buried at Southlawn Cemetery in South Bend.

=== Jackie Walorski Memorial Highway ===
Marshall County

- Location: In August 2025, Marshall County renamed State Road 931 to the Jackie Walorski Memorial Highway.
- Coverage: This section runs from the St. Joseph County line south to the Fulton County line.

More than a month after her death, during a public conference, President Biden mistakenly called on Walorski and was looking for her in the audience, even though he had previously commented upon her death and attended a service for her.

Republican Rudy Yakym was chosen as Walorski's successor in a special election in November 2022.

== Honors ==
Walorski was awarded the following foreign honor:

- Commander of the Order of the Star of Romania (June 8, 2017).

== Electoral history ==
Indiana House of Representatives, 21st District, 2004
Party	Candidate	Votes	%
Republican	Jackie Walorski	13,745	64%
Democratic	Carl H. Kaser	7,728	36%

Indiana House of Representatives, 21st District, 2006
Party	Candidate	Votes	%	±%
Republican	Jackie Walorski	8,899	53%	
Democratic	Robert Kovach	7,980	47%	
Turnout		16,879		
Republican hold		Swing		

Indiana House of Representatives, 21st District, 2008
Party	Candidate	Votes	%	±%
Republican	Jackie Walorski	17,605	99%	
N/A	Clyde James (Write-in)	232	1%	
Turnout		17,837		
Republican hold		Swing		

Indiana's 2nd congressional district election, 2010
Party	Candidate	Votes	%	±%
Democratic	Joe Donnelly (incumbent)	91,341	48%	
Republican	Jackie Walorski	88,803	47%	
Libertarian	Mark Vogel	9,447	5%	
Turnout		189,591	41%	
Democratic hold		Swing		

Indiana's 2nd congressional district election, 2012
Party	Candidate	Votes	%	±%
Republican	Jackie Walorski	134,033	49%	
Democratic	Brendan Mullen	130,113	48%	
Libertarian	Joe Ruiz	9,326	3%	
N/A	Kenneth R. Luntz, Jr. (Write-in)	3	0%	
Turnout		273,475	56%	
Republican gain from Democratic		Swing		

Indiana's 2nd congressional district election, 2014
Party	Candidate	Votes	%	±%
Republican	Jackie Walorski (incumbent)	85,119	59%	
Democratic	Joe Bock	55,331	38%	
Libertarian	Jeff Petermann	3,992	3%	
Turnout		144,442		
Republican hold		Swing		

Indiana's 2nd congressional district election, 2016
Party	Candidate	Votes	%	±%
Republican	Jackie Walorski (incumbent)	164,355	59%	
Democratic	Lynn Coleman	102,401	37%	
Libertarian	Ron Cenkush	10,601	4%	
Turnout		277,357		
Republican hold		Swing		

Indiana's 2nd congressional district election, 2018
Party	Candidate	Votes	%	±%
Republican	Jackie Walorski (incumbent)	125,499	55%	
Democratic	Mel Hall	103,363	45%	
No party	Richard Wolf (Write-in)	27	0%	
Turnout		228,889		
Republican hold		Swing		

Indiana's 2nd congressional district election, 2020
Party	Candidate	Votes	%	±%
Republican	Jackie Walorski (incumbent)	183,601	61.5	
Democratic	Pat Hackett	114,967	38.5	
Turnout		298,568		
Republican hold		Swing		

== See also ==
- Women in the United States House of Representatives
- List of members of the United States Congress who died in office (2000–present)#2020s

== Notes ==
U.S. House of Representatives
Preceded by Joe Donnelly	Member of the U.S. House of Representatives from Indiana's 2nd congressional district 2013–2022	Succeeded by Rudy Yakym
Preceded by Kenny Marchant	Ranking Member of the House Ethics Committee; 2021–2022	Succeeded by Michael Guest; Acting
