= 2010 United States House of Representatives elections in Indiana =

- November 2, 2010

All 9 Indiana seats to the United States House of Representatives
| | Majority party | Minority party |
|---|---|---|
| Party | Republican | Democratic |
| Last election | 4 | 5 |
| Seats won | 6 | 3 |
| Seat change | ▲2 | ▼2 |
| Popular vote | 972,671 | 679,462 |
| Percentage | 55.65% | 38.88% |
| Swing | ▲9.31% | ▼13.01% |

Republican hold Republican gain
Democratic hold
Republican
40–50%
50–60%
60–70%
70–80%
Democratic
40–50%
50–60%
60–70%

The 2010 congressional elections in Indiana were held on November 2, 2010, to determine who would represent the state of Indiana in the United States House of Representatives. Representatives are elected for two-year terms; those elected served in the 112th Congress from January 2011 until January 2013, except for the winner of the 3rd District's special election, who will serve the few remaining weeks of the 111th Congress.

Indiana has nine seats in the House, apportioned according to the 2000 United States census.

== Overview ==
United States House of Representatives elections in Indiana, 2010
| Party | Votes | Percentage | Seats | +/– |
|---|---|---|---|---|
| Republican | 972,671 | 55.65% | 6 | +2 |
| Democratic | 679,462 | 38.88% | 3 | -2 |
| Libertarian | 84,289 | 4.82% | 0 | - |
| Independents | 11,298 | 0.65% | 0 | - |
| Totals | 1,747,720 | 100.00% | 9 | - |

=== By district ===
Results of the 2010 United States House of Representatives elections in Indiana by district:

| District | Republican | | Democratic | | Others | | Total | | Result |
| District | Votes | % | Votes | % | Votes | % | Votes | % | Result |
|---|---|---|---|---|---|---|---|---|---|
| District 1 | 65,558 | 38.63% | 99,387 | 58.56% | 4,762 | 2.81% | 169,707 | 100.0% | Democratic hold |
| District 2 | 88,803 | 46.84% | 91,341 | 48.18% | 9,447 | 4.98% | 189,591 | 100.0% | Democratic hold |
| District 3 | 116,140 | 62.76% | 61,267 | 33.11% | 7,642 | 4.13% | 185,049 | 100.0% | Republican hold |
| District 4 | 138,732 | 68.57% | 53,167 | 26.28% | 10,423 | 5.15% | 202,322 | 100.0% | Republican hold |
| District 5 | 146,899 | 62.14% | 60,024 | 25.39% | 29,484 | 12.47% | 236,407 | 100.0% | Republican hold |
| District 6 | 126,027 | 66.57% | 56,647 | 29.92% | 6,635 | 3.51% | 189,309 | 100.0% | Republican hold |
| District 7 | 55,213 | 37.81% | 86,011 | 58.89% | 4,815 | 3.30% | 146,039 | 100.0% | Democratic hold |
| District 8 | 117,259 | 57.55% | 76,265 | 37.43% | 10,240 | 5.02% | 203,764 | 100.0% | Republican gain |
| District 9 | 118,040 | 52.34% | 95,353 | 42.28% | 12,139 | 5.38% | 225,532 | 100.0% | Republican gain |
| Total | 972,671 | 55.65% | 679,462 | 38.88% | 95,587 | 5.47% | 1,747,720 | 100.0% | |

== District 1 ==
2010 Indiana's 1st congressional district election
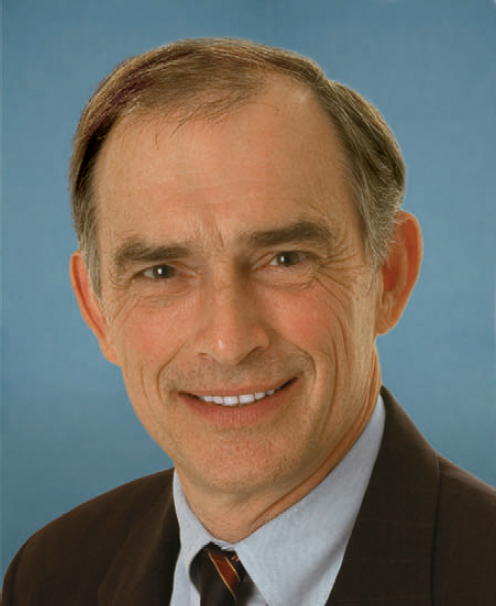

| Nominee | Pete Visclosky | Mark Leyva |
| Party | Democratic | Republican |
| Popular vote | 99,387 | 65,558 |
| Percentage | 58.6% | 38.6% |
- County results Visclosky: 50–60% 60–70% Leyva: 50–60% 60–70%
U.S. Representative before election
Pete Visclosky
Democratic
Elected U.S. Representative
Pete Visclosky
Democratic

Democrat Pete Visclosky has represented this district since 1985. The PVI is D+8. He faced Republican activist Mark Leyva and Libertarian candidate Jon Morris. Visclosky was endorsed by the Northwest Indiana Times and the Indianapolis Star.

=== Predictions ===
| Source | Ranking | As of |
|---|---|---|
| The Cook Political Report | Safe D | November 1, 2010 |
| Rothenberg | Safe D | November 1, 2010 |
| Sabato's Crystal Ball | Safe D | November 1, 2010 |
| RCP | Safe D | November 1, 2010 |
| CQ Politics | Safe D | October 28, 2010 |
| New York Times | Safe D | November 1, 2010 |
| FiveThirtyEight | Safe D | November 1, 2010 |

=== Results ===
Indiana's 1st Congressional District Election (2010)
| Party | Candidate | Votes | % |
|---|---|---|---|
| Democratic | Pete Visclosky (incumbent) | 99,387 | 58.56% |
| Republican | Mark J. Leyva | 65,558 | 38.63% |
| Libertarian | Jon Morris | 4,762 | 2.81% |
| Total votes | | 169,707 | 100.00% |
| Democratic hold | | | |

==== By county ====
| County | Pete Visclosky Democratic | | Mark Leyva Republican | | Jon Morris Libertarian | | Margin | | Total |
| County | Votes | % | Votes | % | Votes | % | Votes | % | Total |
|---|---|---|---|---|---|---|---|---|---|
| Benton | 719 | 32.42% | 1,352 | 60.96% | 147 | 6.63% | -633 | -28.54% | 2,218 |
| Jasper | 2,941 | 35.75% | 4,998 | 60.75% | 288 | 3.50% | -2,058 | -25.02% | 8,227 |
| Lake | 72,818 | 63.72% | 38,857 | 34.00% | 2,609 | 2.28% | 33,961 | 29.72% | 114,284 |
| Newton | 1,704 | 39.78% | 2,335 | 54.51% | 245 | 5.72% | -631 | -14.73% | 4,284 |
| Porter | 21,205 | 52.11% | 18,016 | 44.27% | 1,473 | 3.62% | 3,189 | 7.84% | 40,694 |

== District 2 ==
2010 Indiana's 2nd congressional district election
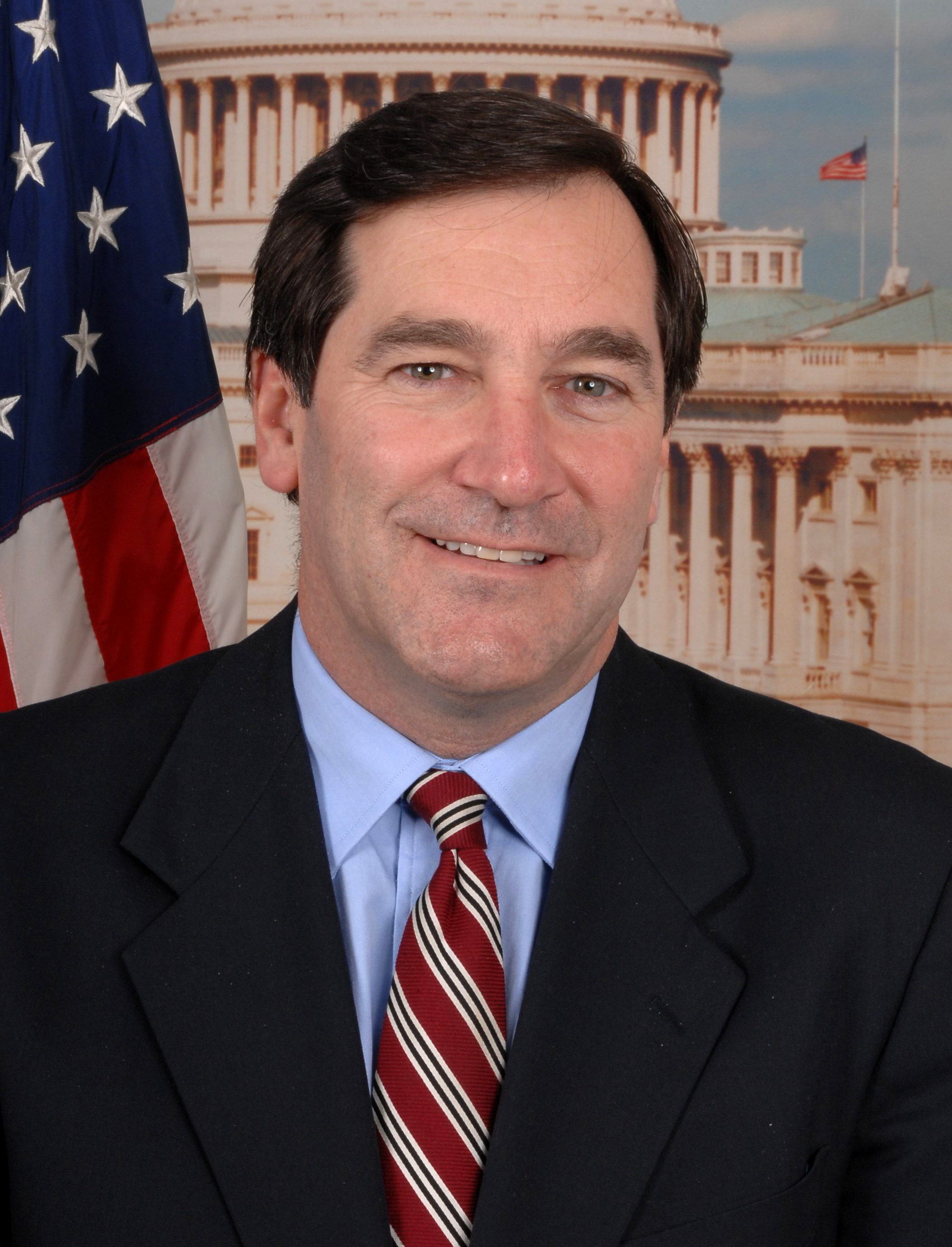

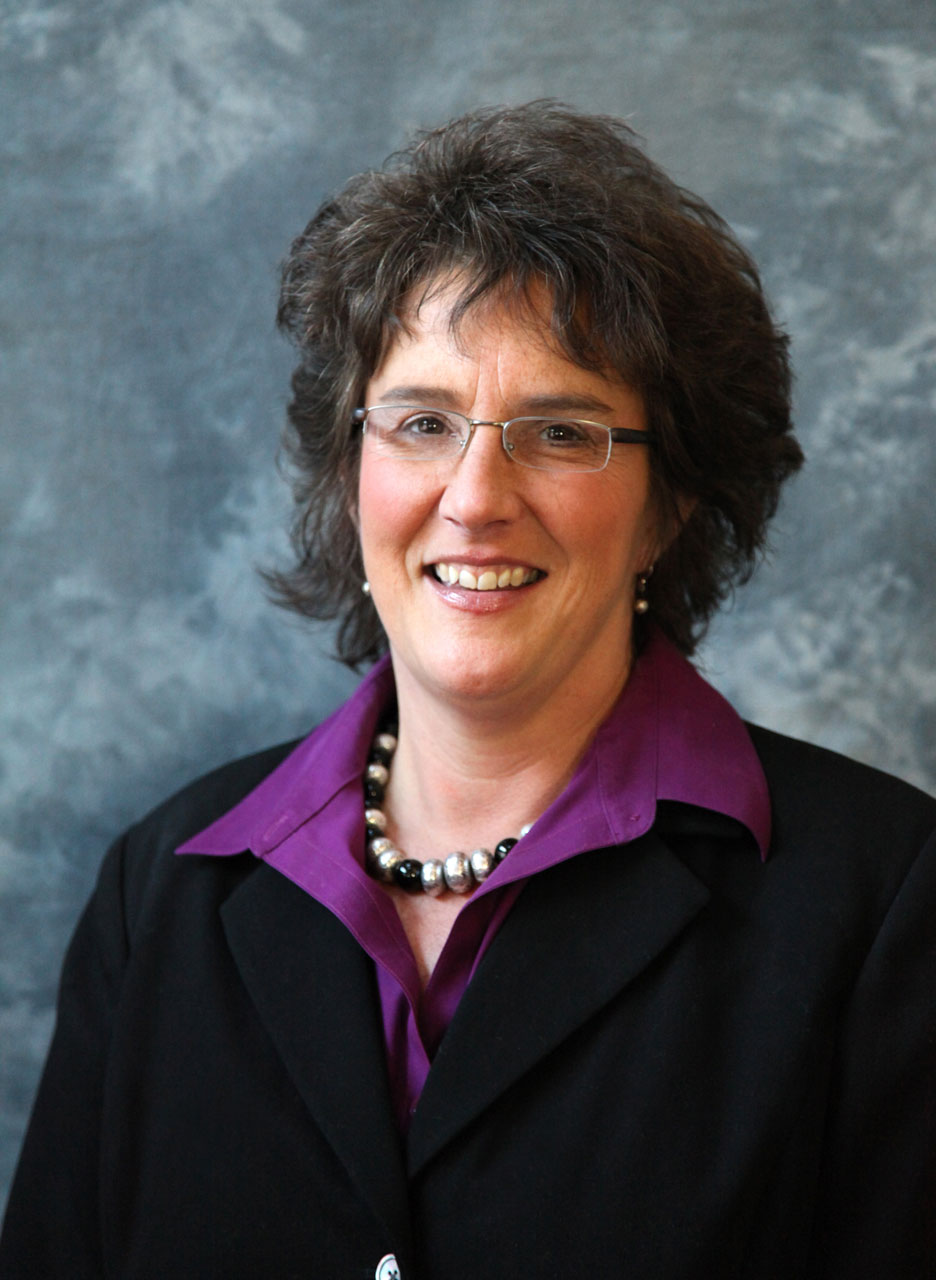
| Nominee | Joe Donnelly | Jackie Walorski |
| Party | Democratic | Republican |
| Popular vote | 91,341 | 88,803 |
| Percentage | 48.2% | 46.8% |
- County results Donnelly: 40–50% 50–60% Walorski: 50–60% 60–70%
U.S. Representative before election
Joe Donnelly
Democratic
Elected U.S. Representative
Joe Donnelly
Democratic

Democrat Joe Donnelly had represented this district since 2007 and ran for reelection. He was challenged by Republican nominee State Representative Jackie Walorski, whom he defeated.

Obama carried this district with 54% of the vote in 2008.

- IN - District 2 from OurCampaigns.com
- Campaign Contributions from OpenSecrets
- 2010 Indiana - 2nd District from CQ Politics
- Race profile at The New York Times

=== Polling ===
| Poll source | Date(s) administered | Sample size | Margin of error | Joe Donnelly (D) | Jackie Walorski (R) | Undecided |
|---|---|---|---|---|---|---|
| EPIC-MRA | October 20–22, 2010 | 400 | ± 4.9% | 48% | 43% | n/a |
| EPIC-MRA | October 1–3, 2010 | 400 | ± 4.9% | 48% | 39% | 7% |
| American Action Forum via South Bend Tribune | August 16–19, 2010 | 400 | ± 4.9% | 46% | 44% | n/a |
| The Polling Company | July 31-August 3, 2010 | 309 | ± 5.6% | 52% | 35% | 11% |

=== Predictions ===
| Source | Ranking | As of |
|---|---|---|
| The Cook Political Report | Tossup | November 1, 2010 |
| Rothenberg | Lean D | November 1, 2010 |
| Sabato's Crystal Ball | Lean D | November 1, 2010 |
| RCP | Tossup | November 1, 2010 |
| CQ Politics | Lean D | October 28, 2010 |
| New York Times | Tossup | November 1, 2010 |
| FiveThirtyEight | Lean D | November 1, 2010 |

=== Results ===
Indiana's 2nd Congressional District Election (2010)
| Party | Candidate | Votes | % |
|---|---|---|---|
| Democratic | Joe Donnelly (incumbent) | 91,341 | 48.18% |
| Republican | Jackie Walorski | 88,803 | 46.84% |
| Libertarian | Mark Vogel | 9,447 | 4.98% |
| Total votes | | 189,591 | 100.00% |
| Turnout | | | |
| Democratic hold | | | |

==== By county ====
| County | Joe Donnelly Democratic | | Jackie Walorski Republican | | Mark Vogel Libertarian | | Margin | | Total |
| County | # | % | # | % | # | % | # | % | Total |
|---|---|---|---|---|---|---|---|---|---|
| Carroll | 1,850 | 30.90% | 3,718 | 62.10% | 419 | 7.00% | -1,868 | -31.20% | 5,987 |
| Cass | 3,608 | 33.00% | 6,691 | 61.21% | 633 | 5.79% | -3,083 | -28.20% | 10,932 |
| Elkhart | 7,756 | 40.80% | 10,481 | 55.13% | 775 | 4.08% | -2,725 | -14.33% | 19,012 |
| Fulton | 2,591 | 42.23% | 3,149 | 51.33% | 395 | 6.44% | -558 | -9.10% | 6,135 |
| Howard | 3,916 | 46.93% | 3,901 | 46.75% | 527 | 6.32% | 15 | 0.18% | 8,344 |
| La Porte | 15,709 | 54.19% | 11,552 | 39.85% | 1,726 | 5.95% | 4,157 | 14.34% | 28,987 |
| Marshall | 5,421 | 40.74% | 7,226 | 54.30% | 660 | 4.96% | -1,805 | -13.56% | 13,307 |
| Porter | 1,648 | 43.53% | 1,922 | 50.77% | 216 | 5.71% | -274 | -7.24% | 3,786 |
| Pulaski | 1,924 | 41.98% | 2,335 | 51.01% | 324 | 7.07% | -411 | -8.97% | 4,583 |
| St. Joseph | 42,707 | 53.34% | 34,212 | 42.73% | 3,145 | 3.93% | 8,495 | 10.61% | 80,064 |
| Starke | 3,771 | 53.24% | 2,862 | 40.41% | 450 | 6.35% | 909 | 12.83% | 7,083 |
| White | 440 | 32.09% | 754 | 55.00% | 177 | 12.91% | -314 | -22.90% | 1,371 |

== District 3 ==
2010 Indiana's 3rd congressional district election
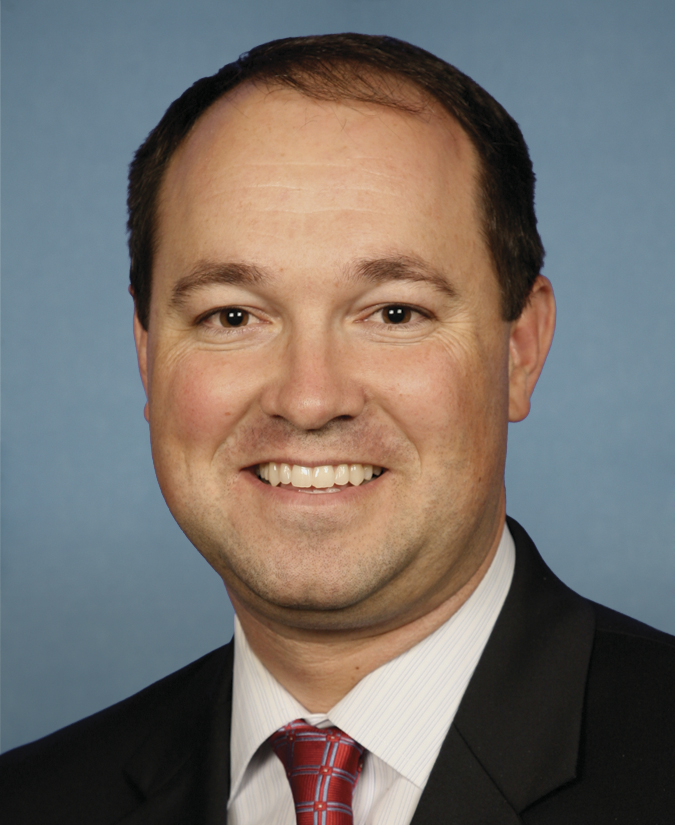

| Nominee | Marlin Stutzman | Thomas Hayhurst |
| Party | Republican | Democratic |
| Popular vote | 116,140 | 61,267 |
| Percentage | 62.8% | 33.1% |
U.S. Representative before election
Mark Souder
Republican
Elected U.S. Representative
Marlin Stutzman
Republican

Republican Mark Souder represented this district from 2003 until his resignation on May 18, 2010. Fellow Republican John McCain carried this district with 56% of the vote in the 2008 presidential election.

In the Republican primary, car dealer Bob Thomas gave Souder a strong challenge in the primary. An April SurveyUSA poll showed Thomas within six percentage points of Souder. Other Republican candidates included attorney Phil Troyer and Tea Party activist Greg Dickman. Souder won the primary with 48% of the vote. He was to face Democrat Fort Wayne councilman Tom Hayhurst.

However, as Souder announced his resignation both from Congress and from his Republican candidacy on May 18, 2010, Governor Mitch Daniels set a date for a special election to be held concurrently with the general election in November. A caucus was to be held to choose the Republican candidate for the special election and the general election. The Republican caucus to choose the nominee was held on June 12, 2010. State Senator Marlin Stutzman was selected as the Republican nominee for both the special and general elections.

=== Republican primary polling ===
| Poll Source | Dates Administered | Mark Souder | Bob Thomas | Phil Troyer | Greg Dickman | Undecided |
|---|---|---|---|---|---|---|
| Survey USA (Link) | April 22–26, 2010 | 35% | 29% | 19% | 2% | 16% |

=== Predictions ===
| Source | Ranking | As of |
|---|---|---|
| The Cook Political Report | Safe R | November 1, 2010 |
| Rothenberg | Safe R | November 1, 2010 |
| Sabato's Crystal Ball | Safe R | November 1, 2010 |
| RCP | Safe R | November 1, 2010 |
| CQ Politics | Safe R | October 28, 2010 |
| New York Times | Safe R | November 1, 2010 |
| FiveThirtyEight | Safe R | November 1, 2010 |

=== Results ===
Indiana's 3rd Congressional District General Election (2010)
| Party | Candidate | Votes | % |
|---|---|---|---|
| Republican | Marlin Stutzman | 116,140 | 62.76% |
| Democratic | Thomas Hayhurst | 61,267 | 33.11% |
| Libertarian | Scott W. Wise | 7,631 | 4.12% |
| Write-In | Tom Metzger | 10 | 0.01% |
| Write-In | Wes Stephens | 1 | 0.00% |
| Total votes | | 185,049 | 100.00% |
| Turnout | | | |
| Republican hold | | | |

==== By county ====
| County | Marlin Stutzman Republican | | Tom Hayhurst Democratic | | Scott Wise Libertarian | | Tom Metzger Write-in | | Wes Stephens Write-in | | Margin | | Total |
| County | Votes | % | Votes | % | Votes | % | Votes | % | Votes | % | Votes | % | Total |
|---|---|---|---|---|---|---|---|---|---|---|---|---|---|
| Allen | 50,331 | 57.53% | 33,892 | 38.74% | 3,268 | 3.74% | 1 | 0.00% | 1 | 0.00% | 16,439 | 18.79% | 87,493 |
| DeKalb | 7,215 | 62.48% | 3,771 | 32.66% | 562 | 4.87% | 0 | 0.00% | 0 | 0.00% | 3,442 | 29.81% | 11,548 |
| Elkhart | 19,284 | 70.64% | 7,251 | 26.56% | 763 | 2.79% | 1 | 0.00% | 0 | 0.00% | 12,033 | 44.08% | 27,299 |
| Kosciusko | 14,820 | 74.27% | 4,229 | 21.19% | 897 | 4.50% | 8 | 0.04% | 0 | 0.00% | 10,591 | 53.08% | 19,954 |
| LaGrange | 4,578 | 69.65% | 1,684 | 25.62% | 311 | 4.73% | 0 | 0.00% | 0 | 0.00% | 2,894 | 44.03% | 6,573 |
| Noble | 7,263 | 64.18% | 3,483 | 30.78% | 570 | 5.04% | 0 | 0.00% | 0 | 0.00% | 3,780 | 33.40% | 11,316 |
| Steuben | 6,055 | 59.59% | 3,565 | 35.09% | 541 | 5.32% | 0 | 0.00% | 0 | 0.00% | 2,490 | 24.51% | 10,161 |
| Whitley | 6,594 | 61.60% | 3,392 | 31.69% | 719 | 6.72% | 0 | 0.00% | 0 | 0.00% | 3,202 | 29.91% | 10,705 |

=== District 3 special election ===
The 2010 special election for Indiana's 3rd congressional district was held November 2, contemporaneously with the regularly scheduled general election. The special election was called to fill the vacancy left by Republican Mark Souder, who resigned after an affair with a staffer was revealed.

==== Democratic candidates ====
- Tom Hayhurst, former Fort Wayne City Councilor; 2006 and 2010 Democratic nominee.

==== Republican candidates ====
Nominee

- Marlin Stutzman, State Senator and former U.S. Senate candidate

== District 4 ==
2010 Indiana's 4th congressional district election
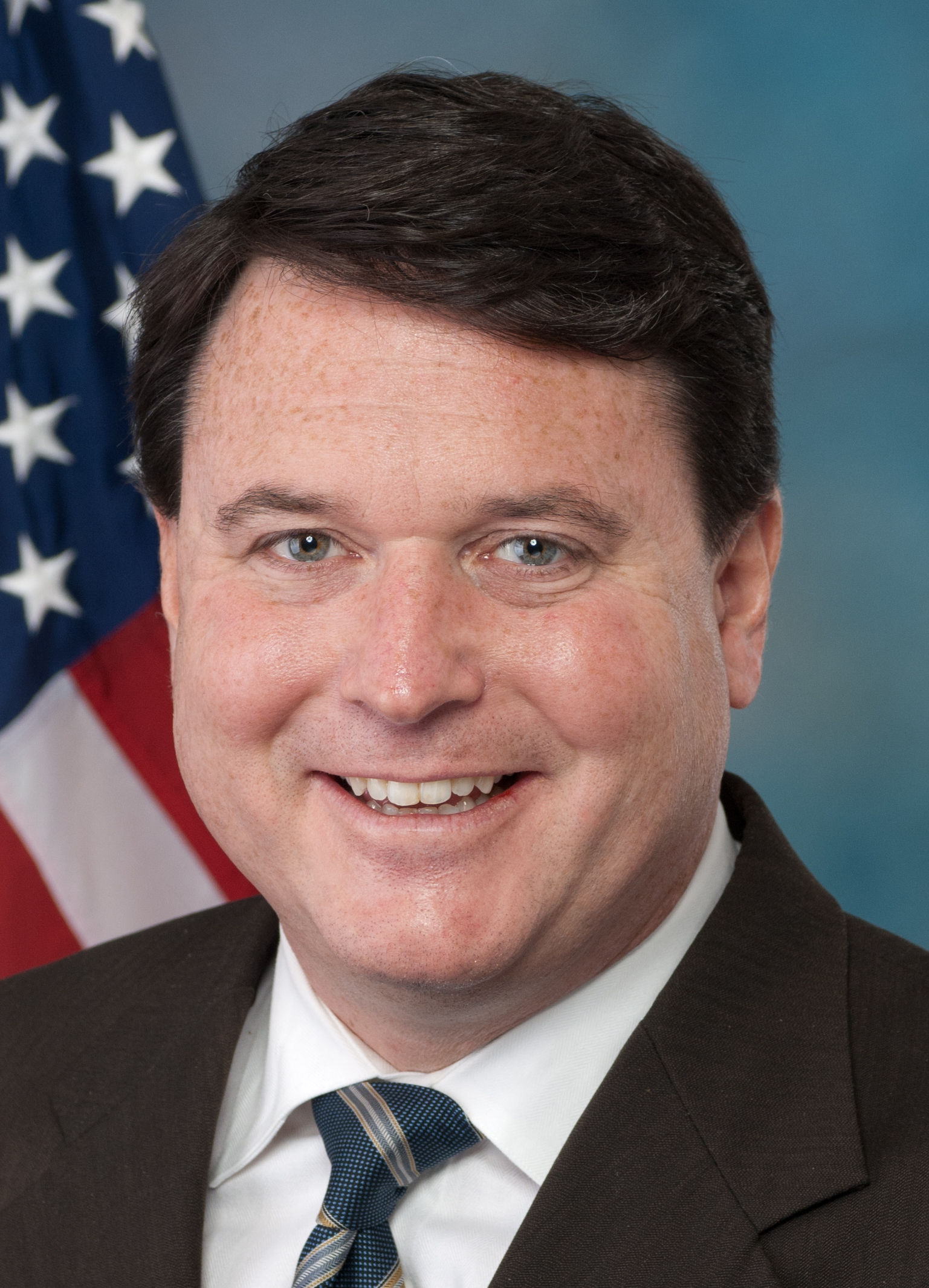

| Nominee | Todd Rokita | David Sanders | John Duncan |
| Party | Republican | Democratic | Libertarian |
| Popular vote | 138,732 | 53,167 | 10,423 |
| Percentage | 68.6% | 26.3% | 5.2% |
- County results Rokita: 50–60% 60–70% 70–80%
U.S. Representative before election
Steve Buyer
Republican
Elected U.S. Representative
Todd Rokita
Republican

Republican Steve Buyer did not run for re-election. McCain carried the district with 56% of the vote. Todd Rokita, the Republican Secretary of State of Indiana, Republican State Senator Brandt Hershman, Cheryl Denise Allen and Mark Seitz filed to run for Buyer's vacant seat. Rokita won the primary and defeated Democrat David Sanders in the general election.

=== Predictions ===
| Source | Ranking | As of |
|---|---|---|
| The Cook Political Report | Safe R | November 1, 2010 |
| Rothenberg | Safe R | November 1, 2010 |
| Sabato's Crystal Ball | Safe R | November 1, 2010 |
| RCP | Safe R | November 1, 2010 |
| CQ Politics | Safe R | October 28, 2010 |
| New York Times | Safe R | November 1, 2010 |
| FiveThirtyEight | Safe R | November 1, 2010 |

=== Results ===
Indiana's 4th Congressional District Election (2010)
| Party | Candidate | Votes | % |
|---|---|---|---|
| Republican | Todd Rokita | 138,732 | 68.57% |
| Democratic | David Sanders | 53,167 | 26.28% |
| Libertarian | John Duncan | 10,423 | 5.15% |
| Total votes | | 202,322 | 100.00% |
| Turnout | | | |
| Republican hold | | | |

==== By county ====
| County | Todd Rokita Republican | | David Sanders Democratic | | John Duncan Constitution | | Margin | | Total |
| County | Votes | % | Votes | % | Votes | % | Votes | % | Total |
|---|---|---|---|---|---|---|---|---|---|
| Boone | 13,836 | 73.94% | 3,954 | 21.13% | 922 | 4.93% | 9,882 | 52.81% | 18,712 |
| Clinton | 4,989 | 67.45% | 1,974 | 26.69% | 434 | 5.87% | 3,015 | 40.76% | 7,397 |
| Fountain | 1,133 | 63.12% | 544 | 30.31% | 118 | 6.57% | 589 | 32.81% | 1,795 |
| Hendricks | 28,946 | 74.56% | 8,191 | 21.10% | 1,686 | 4.34% | 20,755 | 53.46% | 38,823 |
| Johnson | 24,216 | 73.99% | 6,885 | 21.04% | 1,627 | 4.97% | 17,331 | 52.95% | 32,728 |
| Lawrence | 7,454 | 68.22% | 2,920 | 26.73% | 552 | 5.05% | 4,534 | 41.50% | 10,926 |
| Marion | 8,125 | 60.50% | 4,732 | 35.23% | 573 | 4.27% | 3,393 | 25.26% | 13,430 |
| Monroe | 4,856 | 58.94% | 2,984 | 36.22% | 399 | 4.84% | 1,872 | 22.72% | 8,239 |
| Montgomery | 7,174 | 67.88% | 2,533 | 23.97% | 862 | 8.16% | 4,641 | 43.91% | 10,569 |
| Morgan | 13,351 | 74.10% | 3,687 | 20.46% | 980 | 5.44% | 9,664 | 53.64% | 18,018 |
| Tippecanoe | 20,572 | 57.80% | 13,152 | 36.95% | 1,866 | 5.24% | 7,420 | 20.85% | 35,590 |
| White | 4,080 | 66.94% | 1,611 | 26.43% | 404 | 6.63% | 2,469 | 40.51% | 6,095 |

== District 5 ==
2010 Indiana's 5th congressional district election
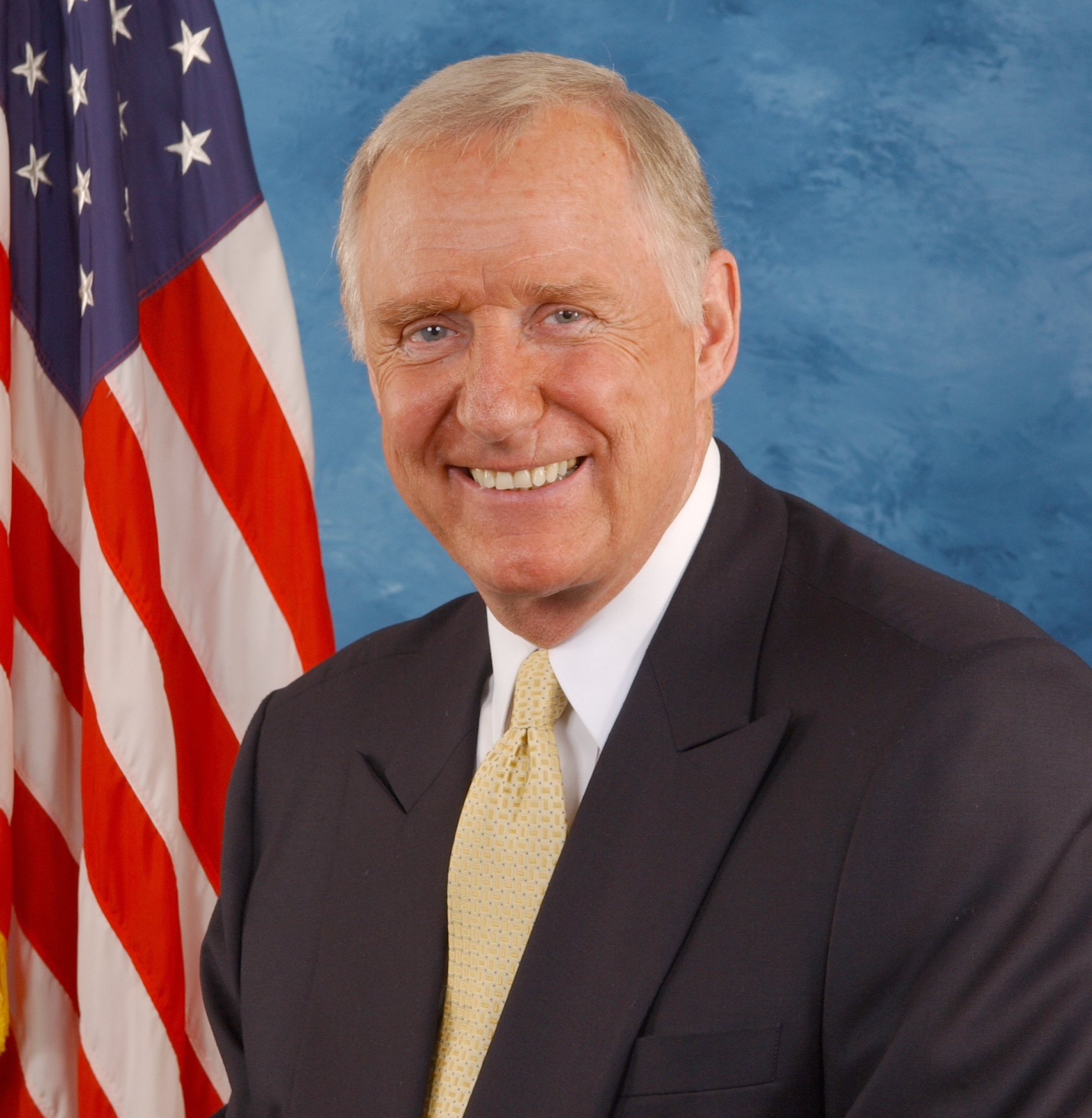

| Nominee | Dan Burton | Tim Crawford | Richard Reid |
| Party | Republican | Democratic | Libertarian |
| Popular vote | 146,899 | 60,024 | 18,266 |
| Percentage | 62.1% | 25.4% | 7.7% |
- County results Burton: 50–60% 60–70% 70–80%
U.S. Representative before election
Dan Burton
Republican
Elected U.S. Representative
Dan Burton
Republican

Republican Dan Burton has represented this district since 2003. John McCain carried 59% of the vote in 2008.

Former Republican candidate Brose McVey, Indiana Republican Party Executive Director Luke Messer, State Representative Mike Murphy, and 2008 primary challenger John McGoff all formally announced their intention to run. Burton won the primary with just 30% of the vote. He faced Democrat Tim Crawford in the general election.

=== Republican primary polling ===
| Poll Source | Dates Administered | Dan Burton | Luke Messer | Brose McVey | John McGoff | Mike Murphy | Andy Lyons | Undecided |
|---|---|---|---|---|---|---|---|---|
| Public Opinion Strategies (Link) | March 5, 2010 | 43% | 9% | 8% | 8% | 4% | 2% | 26% |

=== Predictions ===
| Source | Ranking | As of |
|---|---|---|
| The Cook Political Report | Safe R | November 1, 2010 |
| Rothenberg | Safe R | November 1, 2010 |
| Sabato's Crystal Ball | Safe R | November 1, 2010 |
| RCP | Safe R | November 1, 2010 |
| CQ Politics | Safe R | October 28, 2010 |
| New York Times | Safe R | November 1, 2010 |
| FiveThirtyEight | Safe R | November 1, 2010 |

=== Results ===
Indiana's 5th Congressional District Election (2010)
| Party | Candidate | Votes | % |
|---|---|---|---|
| Republican | Dan Burton (incumbent) | 146,899 | 62.14% |
| Democratic | Tim Crawford | 60,024 | 25.39% |
| Libertarian | Richard Reid | 18,266 | 7.73% |
| Independent | Jesse C. Trueblood | 11,218 | 4.75% |
| Total votes | | 236,407 | 100.00% |
| Turnout | | | |
| Republican hold | | | |

==== By county ====
| County | Dan Burton Republican | | Tim Crawford Democratic | | Richard Reid Libertarian | | Jesse C. Trueblood Independent | | Margin | | Total |
| County | Votes | % | Votes | % | Votes | % | Votes | % | Votes | % | Total |
|---|---|---|---|---|---|---|---|---|---|---|---|
| Grant | 9,880 | 61.81% | 4,839 | 30.27% | 794 | 4.97% | 471 | 2.95% | 5,041 | 31.54% | 15,984 |
| Hamilton | 50,910 | 63.44% | 17,616 | 21.95% | 7,584 | 9.45% | 4,143 | 5.16% | 33,294 | 41.49% | 80,253 |
| Hancock | 14,053 | 62.22% | 5,454 | 24.15% | 1,831 | 8.11% | 1,249 | 5.53% | 8,599 | 38.07% | 22,587 |
| Howard | 10,949 | 62.98% | 4,859 | 27.95% | 713 | 4.10% | 864 | 4.97% | 6,090 | 35.03% | 17,385 |
| Huntington | 7,994 | 71.70% | 2,198 | 19.71% | 446 | 4.00% | 512 | 4.59% | 5,796 | 51.98% | 11,150 |
| Johnson | 1,395 | 67.13% | 421 | 20.26% | 126 | 6.06% | 136 | 6.54% | 974 | 46.87% | 2,078 |
| Marion | 30,968 | 57.03% | 16,288 | 30.00% | 4,853 | 8.94% | 2,191 | 4.03% | 14,680 | 27.03% | 54,300 |
| Miami | 5,400 | 61.94% | 2,202 | 25.26% | 578 | 6.63% | 538 | 6.17% | 3,198 | 36.68% | 8,718 |
| Shelby | 5,874 | 63.84% | 2,370 | 25.76% | 548 | 5.96% | 409 | 4.45% | 3,504 | 38.08% | 9,201 |
| Tipton | 3,625 | 62.04% | 1,597 | 27.33% | 314 | 5.37% | 307 | 5.25% | 2,028 | 34.71% | 5,843 |
| Wabash | 5,851 | 65.68% | 2,180 | 24.47% | 479 | 5.38% | 398 | 4.47% | 3,671 | 41.21% | 8,908 |

== District 6 ==
2010 Indiana's 6th congressional district election
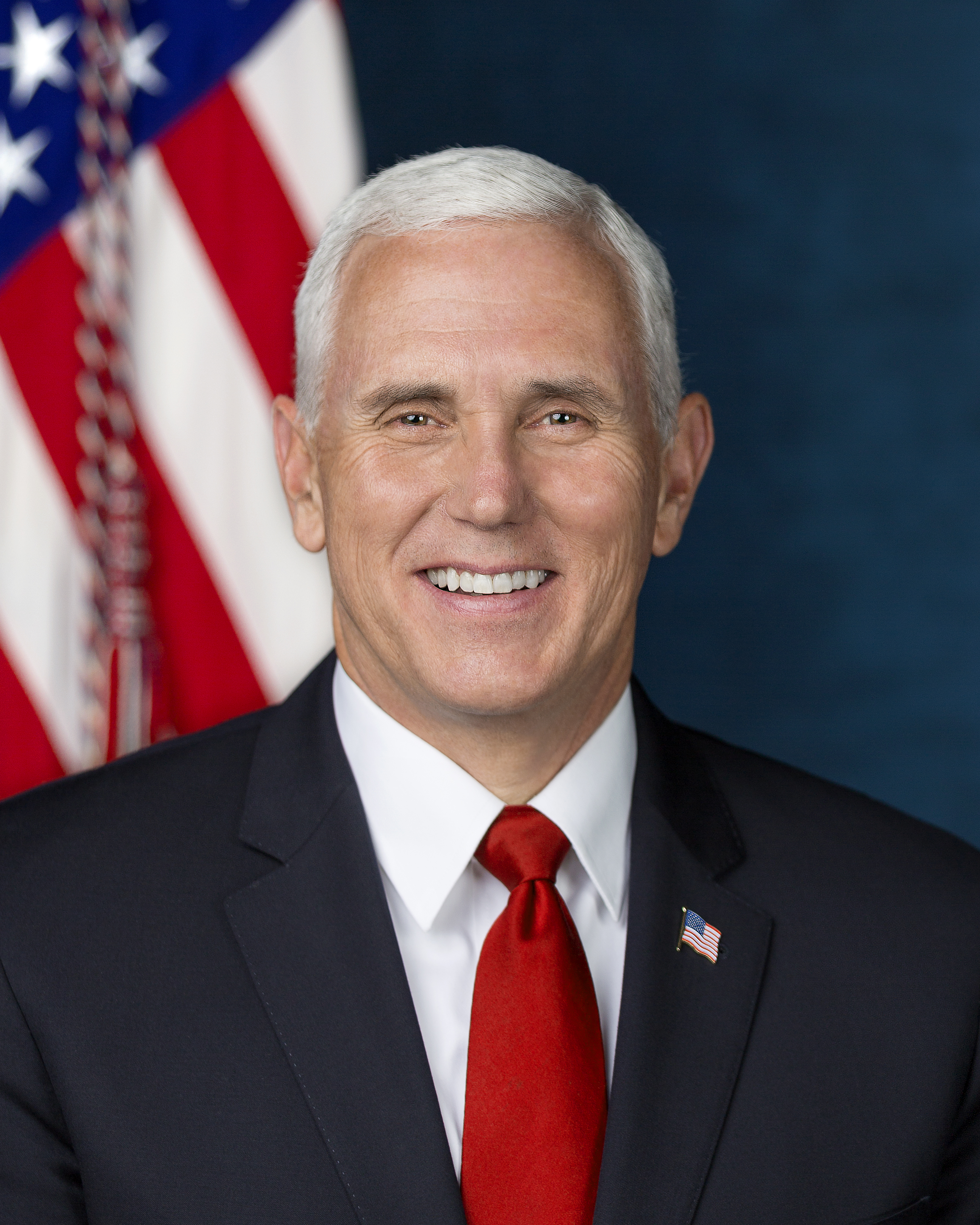

| Nominee | Mike Pence | Barry A. Welsh |
| Party | Republican | Democratic |
| Popular vote | 126,027 | 56,647 |
| Percentage | 66.6% | 29.9% |
- County results Pence: 50–60% 60–70% 70–80% 80–90%
U.S. Representative before election
Mike Pence
Republican
Elected U.S. Representative
Mike Pence
Republican

Republican Mike Pence represented this district since 2003. In the 2008 presidential election, Republican nominee McCain carried the district with 52% of the vote. Pence faced Democratic nominee Barry Welsh, a minister, and defeated him to keep his seat.

=== Predictions ===
| Source | Ranking | As of |
|---|---|---|
| The Cook Political Report | Safe R | November 1, 2010 |
| Rothenberg | Safe R | November 1, 2010 |
| Sabato's Crystal Ball | Safe R | November 1, 2010 |
| RCP | Safe R | November 1, 2010 |
| CQ Politics | Safe R | October 28, 2010 |
| New York Times | Safe R | November 1, 2010 |
| FiveThirtyEight | Safe R | November 1, 2010 |

=== Results ===
Indiana's 6th Congressional District Election (2010)
| Party | Candidate | Votes | % |
|---|---|---|---|
| Republican | Mike Pence (incumbent) | 126,027 | 66.57% |
| Democratic | Barry A. Welsh | 56,647 | 29.92% |
| Libertarian | Talmage "T.J." Thompson, Jr. | 6,635 | 3.51% |
| Total votes | | 189,309 | 100.00% |
| Turnout | | | |
| Republican hold | | | |

==== By county ====
| County | Mike Pence Republican | | Barry A. Welsh Democratic | | Talmage Thompson Jr. Libertarian | | Margin | | Total |
| County | Votes | % | Votes | % | Votes | % | Votes | % | Total |
|---|---|---|---|---|---|---|---|---|---|
| Adams | 7,096 | 74.83% | 2,140 | 22.57% | 247 | 2.60% | 4,956 | 52.26% | 9,483 |
| Allen | 2,577 | 68.94% | 1,059 | 28.33% | 102 | 2.73% | 1,518 | 40.61% | 3,738 |
| Bartholomew | 8,476 | 72.71% | 2,886 | 24.76% | 295 | 2.53% | 5,590 | 47.95% | 11,657 |
| Blackford | 2,480 | 63.80% | 1,292 | 33.24% | 115 | 2.96% | 1,188 | 30.56% | 3,887 |
| Dearborn | 4,264 | 82.28% | 797 | 15.38% | 121 | 2.34% | 3,467 | 66.90% | 5,182 |
| Decatur | 5,866 | 76.45% | 1,580 | 20.59% | 227 | 2.96% | 4,286 | 55.86% | 7,673 |
| Delaware | 17,437 | 56.76% | 12,439 | 40.49% | 845 | 2.75% | 4,998 | 16.27% | 30,721 |
| Fayette | 3,838 | 61.21% | 2,186 | 34.86% | 246 | 3.92% | 1,652 | 26.35% | 6,270 |
| Franklin | 5,327 | 72.44% | 1,777 | 24.16% | 250 | 3.40% | 3,550 | 48.27% | 7,354 |
| Henry | 8,707 | 65.19% | 3,993 | 29.90% | 656 | 4.91% | 4,714 | 35.29% | 13,356 |
| Jay | 3,890 | 67.59% | 1,665 | 28.93% | 200 | 3.48% | 2,225 | 38.66% | 5,755 |
| Johnson | 2,566 | 77.01% | 633 | 19.00% | 133 | 3.99% | 1,933 | 58.01% | 3,332 |
| Madison | 23,470 | 60.12% | 14,293 | 36.61% | 1,277 | 3.27% | 9,177 | 23.51% | 39,040 |
| Randolph | 4,897 | 70.18% | 1,794 | 25.71% | 287 | 4.11% | 3,103 | 44.47% | 6,978 |
| Rush | 3,737 | 75.06% | 993 | 19.94% | 249 | 5.00% | 2,744 | 55.11% | 4,979 |
| Shelby | 1,138 | 78.86% | 247 | 17.12% | 58 | 4.02% | 891 | 61.75% | 1,443 |
| Union | 1,727 | 70.98% | 610 | 25.07% | 96 | 3.95% | 1,117 | 45.91% | 2,433 |
| Wayne | 11,133 | 67.30% | 4,451 | 26.91% | 958 | 5.79% | 6,682 | 40.39% | 16,542 |
| Wells | 7,401 | 78.02% | 1,812 | 19.10% | 273 | 2.88% | 5,589 | 58.92% | 9,486 |

== District 7 ==
2010 Indiana's 7th congressional district election
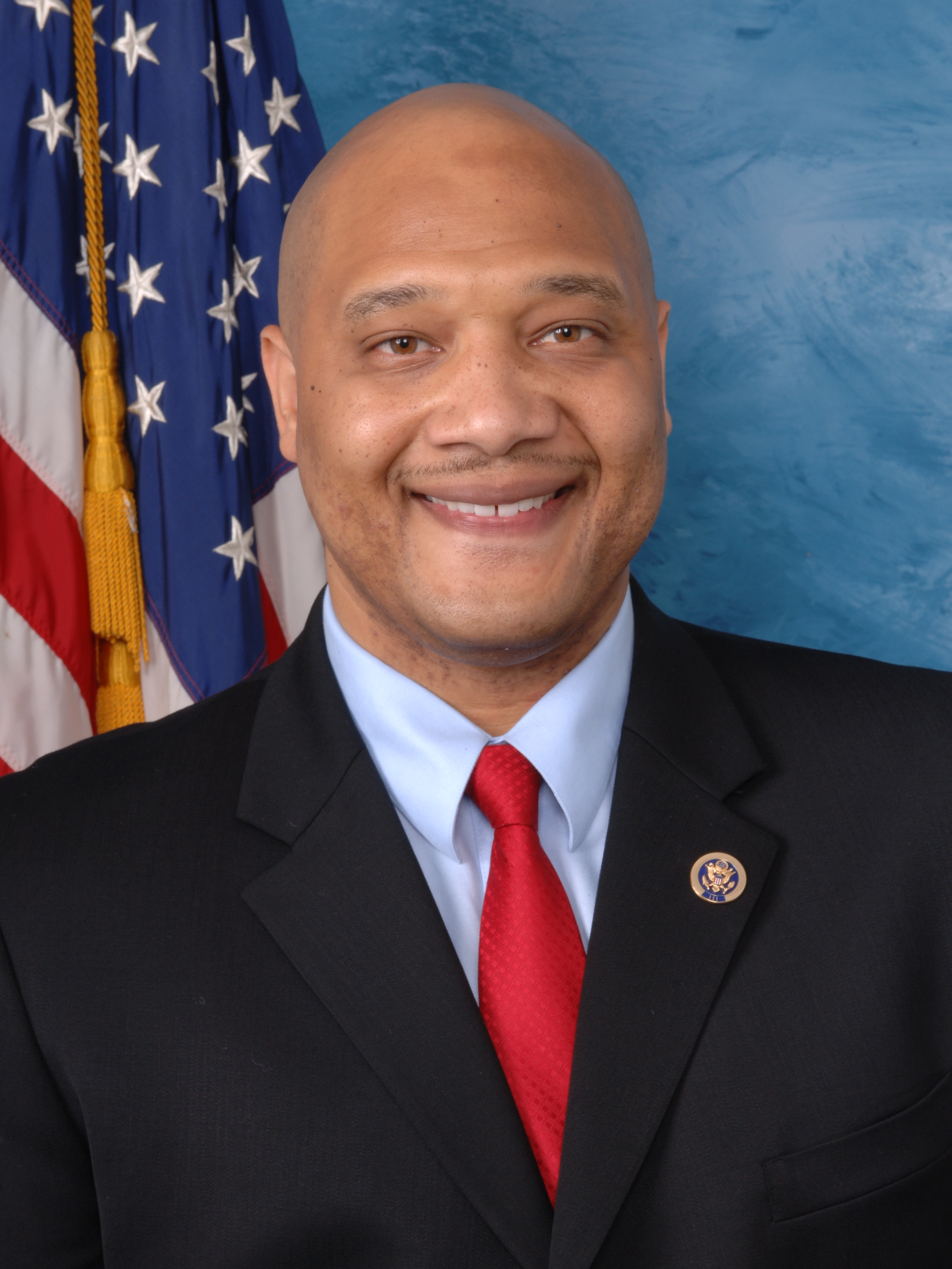

| Nominee | André Carson | Marvin B. Scott |
| Party | Democratic | Republican |
| Popular vote | 86,011 | 55,213 |
| Percentage | 58.9% | 37.8% |
- County results Carson: 50–60%
U.S. Representative before election
André Carson
Democratic
Elected U.S. Representative
André Carson
Democratic

Democrat André Carson has served since 2008. President Obama carried this district with 71% of the vote, considered safe or solid by most sources. He again faced perennial Republican candidate Marvin Scott, who took issue with Carson's Muslim faith during the general election. However, Carson defeated Scott by a large margin to retain his seat.

=== Predictions ===
| Source | Ranking | As of |
|---|---|---|
| The Cook Political Report | Safe D | November 1, 2010 |
| Rothenberg | Safe D | November 1, 2010 |
| Sabato's Crystal Ball | Safe D | November 1, 2010 |
| RCP | Safe D | November 1, 2010 |
| CQ Politics | Safe D | October 28, 2010 |
| New York Times | Safe D | November 1, 2010 |
| FiveThirtyEight | Safe D | November 1, 2010 |

=== Results ===
Indiana's 7th Congressional District Election (2010)
| Party | Candidate | Votes | % |
|---|---|---|---|
| Democratic | André Carson (incumbent) | 86,011 | 58.90% |
| Republican | Marvin B. Scott | 55,213 | 37.81% |
| Libertarian | Dav Wilson | 4,815 | 3.30% |
| Total votes | | 146,039 | 100.00% |
| Turnout | | | |
| Democratic hold | | | |

==== By county ====
| County | André Carson Republican | | Marvin B. Scott Democratic | | Dav Wilson Libertarian | | Margin | | Total |
| County | Votes | % | Votes | % | Votes | % | Votes | % | Total |
|---|---|---|---|---|---|---|---|---|---|
| Marion | 86,011 | 58.90% | 55,213 | 37.81% | 4,815 | 2.55% | 30,798 | 21.09% | 146,039 |

== District 8 ==
2010 Indiana's 8th congressional district election
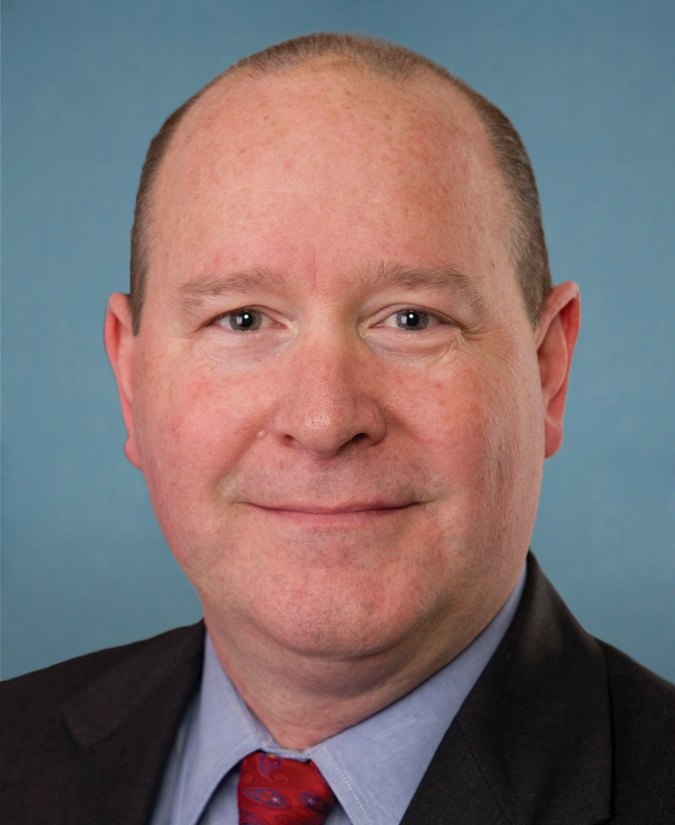

| Nominee | Larry Bucshon | Trent Van Haaften | John Cunningham |
| Party | Republican | Democratic | Libertarian |
| Popular vote | 117,259 | 76,265 | 10,240 |
| Percentage | 57.6% | 37.4% | 5.0% |
- County results Bucshon: 40–50% 50–60% 60–70% 70–80%
U.S. Representative before election
Brad Ellsworth
Democratic
Elected U.S. Representative
Larry Bucshon
Republican

This was an open seat as Democratic incumbent Brad Ellsworth ran (unsuccessfully) for the U.S. Senate. The Democratic nominee was lawyer and State Representative Trent Van Haaften. The Republican nominee was Larry Bucshon, president of Ohio Valley HeartCare.

- IN - District 8 from OurCampaigns.com
- Campaign Contributions from OpenSecrets
- 2010 Indiana - 8th District from CQ Politics
- Race profile at The New York Times

Bucshon received support from the National Republican Congressional Committee and was named a GOP Young Gun. During the campaign, Bucshon was endorsed by several conservative interest groups and elected officials, including the Indiana Chamber of Commerce Congressional Action Committee, United States Chamber of Commerce, National Right to Life Committee, Indiana Right to Life, Indiana Manufacturers Association, Campaign for Working Families, House Minority Leader John Boehner, U.S. Congressman Mike Pence, and Indiana Governor Mitch Daniels.

Bucshon received significant campaign contributions from medical groups Bucshon defeated van Haaften by a margin of 21 points, winning all 18 counties in the district.

=== Polling ===
| Poll source | Date(s) administered | Sample size | Margin of error | Trent Van Haaften (D) | Larry Bucshon (R) | Undecided |
|---|---|---|---|---|---|---|
| Public Opinion Strategies | July 21–22, 2010 | 400 | ± 4.9% | 27% | 43% | n/a |
| OnMessage | September 13–14, 2010 | 400 | ± 4.9% | 20% | 41% | n/a |

=== Predictions ===
| Source | Ranking | As of |
|---|---|---|
| The Cook Political Report | Likely R (flip) | November 1, 2010 |
| Rothenberg | Likely R (flip) | November 1, 2010 |
| Sabato's Crystal Ball | Likely R (flip) | November 1, 2010 |
| RCP | Lean R (flip) | November 1, 2010 |
| CQ Politics | Likely R (flip) | October 28, 2010 |
| New York Times | Safe R (flip) | November 1, 2010 |
| FiveThirtyEight | Likely R (flip) | November 1, 2010 |

=== Results ===
Indiana's 8th Congressional District Election (2010)
| Party | Candidate | Votes | % |
|---|---|---|---|
| Republican | Larry Bucshon | 117,259 | 57.55% |
| Democratic | Trent Van Haaften | 76,265 | 37.43% |
| Libertarian | John Cunningham | 10,240 | 5.03% |
| Total votes | | 203,764 | 100.00% |
| Turnout | | | |
| Republican gain from Democratic | | | |

==== By county ====
| County | Larry Bucshon Republican | | Trent Van Haaften Democratic | | John Cunningham Libertarian | | Margin | | Total |
| County | Votes | % | Votes | % | Votes | % | Votes | % | Total |
|---|---|---|---|---|---|---|---|---|---|
| Clay | 5,024 | 61.67% | 2,666 | 32.73% | 456 | 5.60% | 2,358 | 28.95% | 8,146 |
| Daviess | 5,001 | 71.37% | 1,700 | 24.26% | 306 | 4.37% | 3,301 | 47.11% | 7,007 |
| Fountain | 2,139 | 61.86% | 1,051 | 30.39% | 268 | 7.75% | 1,088 | 31.46% | 3,458 |
| Gibson | 6,638 | 58.80% | 4,103 | 36.35% | 548 | 4.85% | 2,535 | 22.46% | 11,289 |
| Greene | 5,841 | 60.19% | 3,354 | 34.56% | 510 | 5.26% | 2,487 | 25.63% | 9,705 |
| Knox | 6,253 | 56.05% | 4,236 | 37.97% | 667 | 5.98% | 2,017 | 18.08% | 11,156 |
| Martin | 2,432 | 60.36% | 1,332 | 33.06% | 265 | 6.58% | 1,100 | 27.30% | 4,029 |
| Owen | 3,625 | 60.05% | 1,983 | 32.85% | 429 | 7.11% | 1,642 | 27.20% | 6,037 |
| Parke | 3,237 | 60.41% | 1,636 | 30.53% | 485 | 9.05% | 1,601 | 29.88% | 5,358 |
| Pike | 2,478 | 52.89% | 1,960 | 41.84% | 247 | 5.27% | 518 | 11.06% | 4,685 |
| Posey | 5,043 | 50.86% | 4,601 | 46.40% | 271 | 2.73% | 442 | 4.46% | 9,915 |
| Putnam | 6,509 | 65.14% | 2,759 | 27.61% | 724 | 7.25% | 3,750 | 37.53% | 9,992 |
| Sullivan | 3,654 | 53.40% | 2,746 | 40.13% | 443 | 6.47% | 908 | 13.27% | 6,843 |
| Vanderburgh | 28,788 | 57.58% | 19,459 | 38.92% | 1,751 | 3.50% | 9,329 | 18.66% | 49,998 |
| Vermillion | 2,269 | 46.77% | 2,242 | 46.22% | 340 | 7.01% | 27 | 0.56% | 4,851 |
| Vigo | 13,955 | 49.31% | 12,736 | 45.00% | 1,609 | 5.69% | 1,219 | 4.31% | 28,300 |
| Warren | 1,574 | 62.21% | 757 | 29.92% | 199 | 7.87% | 817 | 32.29% | 2,530 |
| Warrick | 12,799 | 62.54% | 6,944 | 33.93% | 722 | 3.53% | 5,855 | 28.61% | 20,465 |

== District 9 ==
2010 Indiana's 9th congressional district election
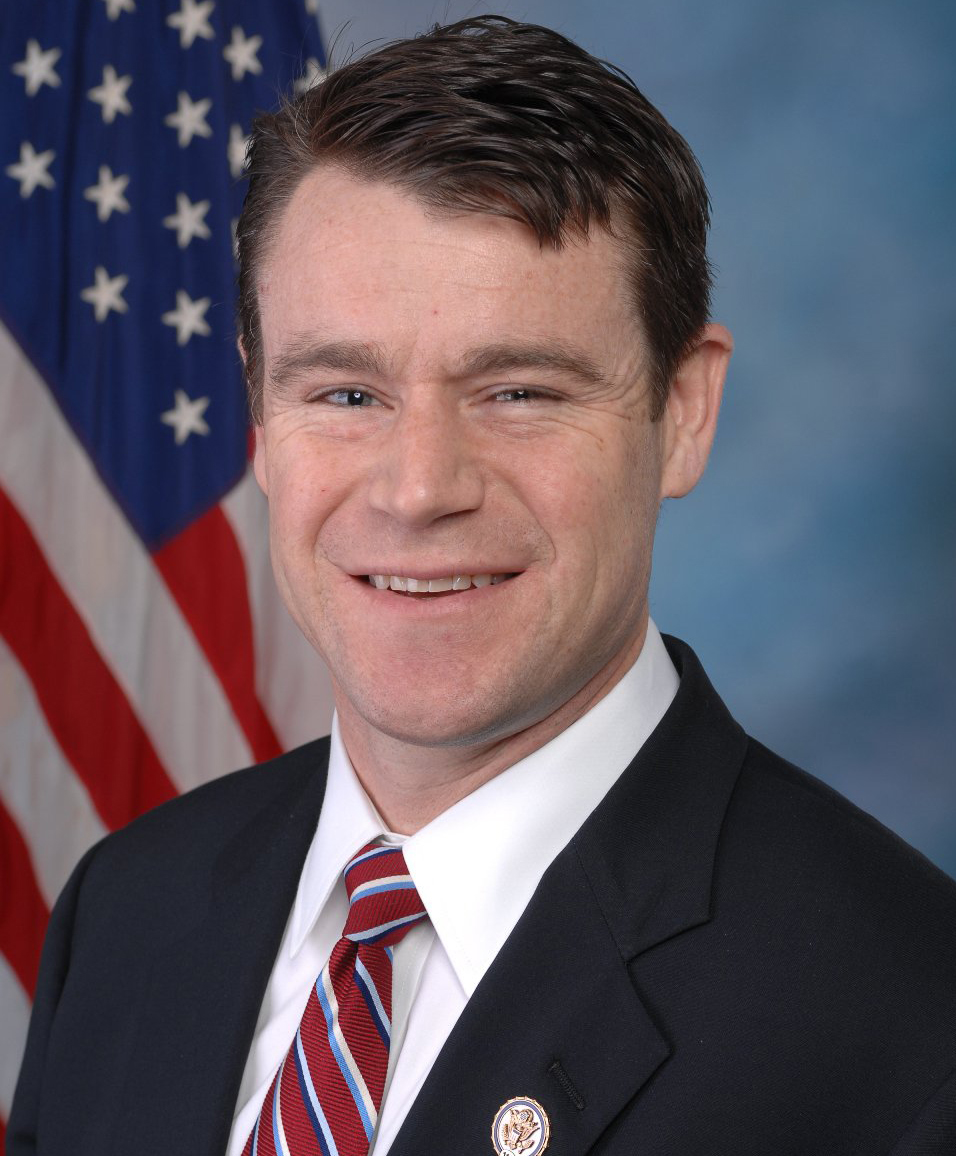

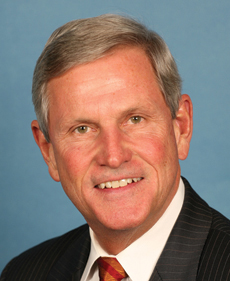

| Nominee | Todd Young | Baron Hill | Greg "No Bull" Knott |
| Party | Republican | Democratic | Libertarian |
| Popular vote | 118,040 | 95,353 | 12,070 |
| Percentage | 52.3% | 42.3% | 5.4% |
- County results Young: 40–50% 50–60% 60–70% Hill: 40–50% 50–60%
U.S. Representative before election
Baron Hill
Democratic
Elected U.S. Representative
Todd Young
Republican

Democratic incumbent Baron Hill was challenged by Republican Todd Young (campaign site, PVS, WhoRunsGov), Libertarian Greg Knott (campaign site, PVS), and Independent Jerry Lucas (campaign site, PVS). He was defeated, and was defeated by Todd Young.

- IN - District 9 from OurCampaigns.com
- Campaign Contributions from OpenSecrets
- 2010 Indiana - 9th District from CQ Politics
- Race profile, nytimes.com; accessed November 9, 2016.

=== Primaries ===
Five-term Congressman Democrat Baron Hill has won in the ninth district since 1998, except for in 2004, when he lost to Republican Mike Sodrel by 1,425 votes. Hill narrowly regained his seat from Sodrel in 2006 and won another race with Sodrel in 2008 by a wider margin. McCain carried the district with only 50% of the vote. In 2010, Sodrel sought another rematch, but lost to former Marine Captain and Orange County Deputy Prosecutor Todd Young in the Republican primary. Independent Jerry Lucas, a nurse and army veteran, has also filed to run. Greg Knott entered the race as the Libertarian Party candidate.

Prior to the campaign season, Hill came under increasing public pressure following the passage of the Patient Protection and Affordable Care Act. At public meetings, Hill had to be escorted by state police for his protection and had heated verbal exchanges with the public which made local news on several occasions and leading Hill to refuse to hold additional public meetings in person.

=== General ===
Hill launched a series of campaign ads beginning in mid August questioning Young's intentions for the future of Social Security and highlighting a comment made by Young referring to it as a "Ponzi scheme". Local media covering the debate questioned both candidates about their ads; Hill defended his support of healthcare, stimulus, and new regulatory legislation as the correct votes for the future of the country.

Young reconfirmed his position, stating Social Security was indeed a "Ponzi scheme" and needed reform to remain financially viable and called on Hill to explain his financial plans for the nation.

The last week of August, the Young campaign began running ads on radio and television pointing out Hill's record of supporting spending legislation and calling on fiscal restraint in Congress. On the night of August 30, Young's Bloomington campaign headquarters were vandalized; the air conditioner was stolen, the phone and internet lines into the building were cut, the power disconnected. The Young campaign requested that Hill participate in seven town hall style debates. The first scheduled debate will be held October 18 at the Buskirk-Chumley Theater in Bloomington.

In a post-primary June Public Opinion Strategies poll, Hill had a 41–33 lead over Young. An August poll conducted by the Young campaign suggested only 37% of voters believed Hill deserved another term. During the first week of September Real Clear Politics had the race rated as a toss-up.

==== Polling ====
| Poll source | Date(s) administered | Sample size | Margin of error | Baron Hill (D) | Todd Young (R) | Undecided |
|---|---|---|---|---|---|---|
| Public Opinion Strategies | May 25–26, 2010 | 300 | ±5.7% | 41% | 34% | n/a |
| Public Opinion Strategies | July 26–28, 2010 | 300 | ±4.9% | 42% | 41% | n/a |
| The Hill/ANGA | October 16–19, 2010 | 400 | ±4.9% | 46% | 44% | 9% |
| Public Opinion Strategies | October 24–25, 2010 | n/a | ±5.7% | 37% | 49% | n/a |

=== Predictions ===
| Source | Ranking | As of |
|---|---|---|
| The Cook Political Report | Tossup | November 1, 2010 |
| Rothenberg | Tilt R (flip) | November 1, 2010 |
| Sabato's Crystal Ball | Lean R (flip) | November 1, 2010 |
| RCP | Lean R (flip) | November 1, 2010 |
| CQ Politics | Tossup | October 28, 2010 |
| New York Times | Tossup | November 1, 2010 |
| FiveThirtyEight | Lean R (flip) | November 1, 2010 |

=== Results ===
Indiana's 9th Congressional District Election (2010)
| Party | Candidate | Votes | % |
|---|---|---|---|
| Republican | Todd Young | 118,040 | 52.34% |
| Democratic | Baron Hill (incumbent) | 95,353 | 42.28% |
| Libertarian | Greg "No Bull" Knott | 12,070 | 5.35% |
| No party | Jerry R. Lucas | 69 | 0.03% |
| Total votes | | 225,532 | 100.00% |
| Turnout | | | |
| Republican gain from Democratic | | | |

==== By county ====
| County | Todd Young Republican | | Baron Hill Democratic | | Greg "No Bull" Knot Libertarian | | Jerry R. Lucas Write-in | | Margin | | Total |
| County | Votes | % | Votes | % | Votes | % | Votes | % | Votes | % | Total |
|---|---|---|---|---|---|---|---|---|---|---|---|
| Bartholomew | 5,044 | 61.65% | 2,771 | 33.87% | 362 | 4.42% | 5 | 0.06% | 2,273 | 27.78% | 8,182 |
| Brown | 3,365 | 53.63% | 2,519 | 40.15% | 390 | 6.22% | 0 | 0.00% | 846 | 13.48% | 6,274 |
| Clark | 17,573 | 53.17% | 13,926 | 42.13% | 1,544 | 4.67% | 10 | 0.03% | 3,647 | 11.03% | 33,053 |
| Crawford | 1,821 | 46.61% | 1,817 | 46.51% | 269 | 6.89% | 0 | 0.00% | 4 | 0.10% | 3,907 |
| Dearborn | 6,254 | 62.39% | 3,327 | 33.19% | 443 | 4.42% | 0 | 0.00% | 2,927 | 29.20% | 10,024 |
| Dubois | 7,705 | 55.00% | 5,505 | '39.30% | 798 | 5.70% | 0 | 0.00% | 2,200 | 15.71% | 14,008 |
| Floyd | 14,437 | 55.67% | 10,513 | 40.54% | 981 | 3.78% | 0 | 0.00% | 3,924 | 15.13% | 25,931 |
| Harrison | 8,087 | 54.42% | 5,866 | 39.48% | 905 | 6.09% | 2 | 0.01% | 2,221 | 14.95% | 14,860 |
| Jackson | 7,617 | 55.72% | 4,980 | 36.43% | 1,061 | 7.76% | 12 | 0.09% | 2,637 | 19.29% | 13,670 |
| Jefferson | 5,436 | 53.63% | 3,974 | 39.21% | 721 | 7.11% | 5 | 0.05% | 1,462 | 14.42% | 10,136 |
| Jennings | 4,521 | 53.14% | 3,264 | 38.37% | 708 | 8.32% | 14 | 0.16% | 1,257 | 14.78% | 8,507 |
| Monroe | 10,090 | 36.56% | 16,455 | 59.62% | 1,051 | 3.81% | 5 | 0.02% | -6,365 | -23.06% | 27,601 |
| Ohio | 1,317 | 58.53% | 843 | 37.47% | 90 | 4.00% | 0 | 0.00% | 473 | 21.02% | 2,250 |
| Orange | 3,414 | 57.25% | 2,190 | 36.73% | 357 | 5.99% | 2 | 0.03% | 1,224 | 20.53% | 5,963 |
| Perry | 2,606 | 36.92% | 3,753 | 56.05% | 337 | 5.03% | 0 | 0.00% | -1,347 | -20.12% | 6,696 |
| Ripley | 5,363 | 63.71% | 2,613 | 31.04% | 433 | 5.14% | 9 | 0.11% | 2,750 | 32.67% | 8,418 |
| Scott | 3,209 | 45.26% | 3,383 | 47.72% | 495 | 6.98% | 3 | 0.04% | -174 | -2.45% | 7,090 |
| Spencer | 3,742 | 50.20% | 3,316 | 44.49% | 395 | 5.30% | 1 | 0.01% | 426 | 5.72% | 7,454 |
| Switzerland | 1,547 | 51.12% | 1,303 | 43.06% | 176 | 5.82% | 0 | 0.00% | 244 | 8.06% | 3,026 |
| Washington | 4,892 | 57.68% | 3,035 | 35.78% | 554 | 6.53% | 1 | 0.01% | 1,867 | 22.01% | 8,482 |
