= Research and Development Efficiency Act =

- Long title: To improve the efficiency of Federal research and development, and for other purposes.
- Announced in: the 113th United States Congress
- Sponsored by: Rep. Larry Bucshon (R, IN-8)
- Number of co-sponsors: 1

Codification
- Agencies affected: United States Congress, Office of Management and Budget, Office of Science and Technology Policy

Legislative history
- Introduced in the House as H.R. 5056 by Rep. Larry Bucshon (R, IN-8) on July 10, 2014; Committee consideration by United States House Committee on Science, Space and Technology; Passed the House on July 14, 2014 (voice vote)

The Research and Development Efficiency Act (H.R. 5056) is a bill that would instruct the Office of Science and Technology Policy to establish a working group under the authority of the National Science and Technology Council to review federal regulations affecting research and research universities and make recommendations on how to streamline them and reduce the regulatory burden on such researchers.

The bill was introduced and passed in the United States House of Representatives during the 113th United States Congress.

== Background ==
The National Science Board conducted a survey that found that an average of 42 percent of a federal research grant recipient's time is spent on administrative tasks.

== Provisions of the bill ==
According to a description from Rep. Ed Royce (R-CA), the bill "establishes a working group to review federal regulations affecting research universities in order to eliminate redundant and duplicative federal regulation."

== Procedural history ==
The Research and Development Efficiency Act was introduced into the United States House of Representatives on July 10, 2014 by Rep. Larry Bucshon (R, IN-8). It was referred to the United States House Committee on Science, Space and Technology. On July 14, 2014, the House voted to pass the bill in a voice vote.

== Debate and discussion ==
The Association of American Universities (AAU) supported the bill, arguing that the legislation "can lead to a long-needed reduction in the regulatory burden currently imposed on universities and their faculty members who conduct research on behalf of the federal government." According to the AAU, "too often federal requirements" for accounting for federal grant money "are ill-conceived, ineffective, and/or duplicative." This wastes the researchers' times and "reduces the time they can devote to discovery and innovation and increases institutional compliance costs."

Rep. Lamar Smith supported the bill, saying that it was "an important step to ensure federal research dollars are being spent on research and not on regulatory requirements."

Rep. Bucshon, who introduced the bill, said that his goal is "to alleviate some of the burden placed on our research universities so they can get back to their main goal of conducting basic science research."

== See also ==
- List of bills in the 113th United States Congress
- Funding of science
- Science policy of the United States
