= Wendy McNamara =

American politician from Indiana

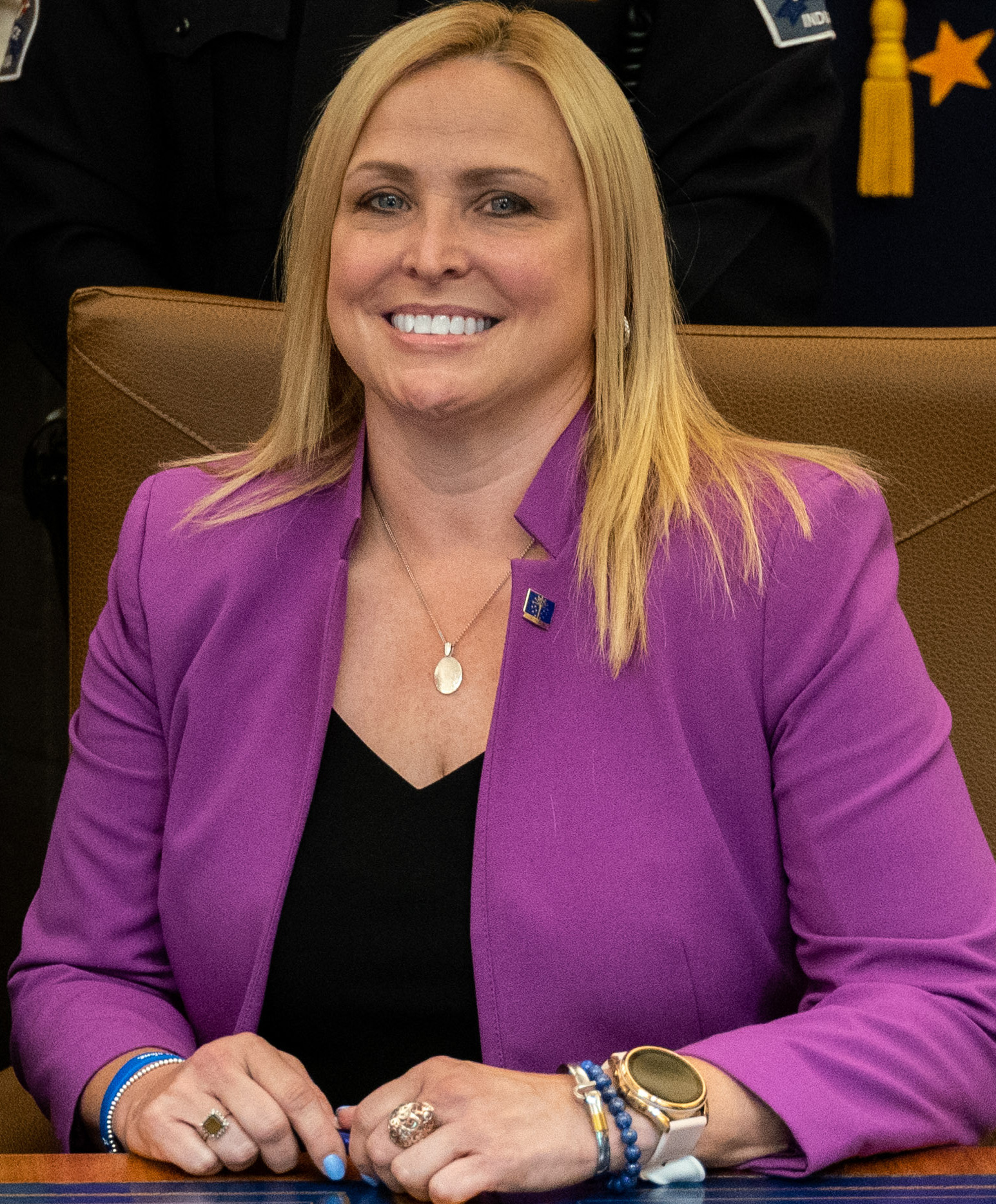

Member of the Indiana House of Representatives from the 76th district
- Incumbent
- Assumed office November 3, 2010
- Preceded by: Trent Van Haaften

Personal details
- Born: January 26, 1970 (age 55)
- Political party: Republican
- Education: University of Indianapolis (BS); University of Southern Indiana (MS)

Wendy McNamara (born January 26, 1970) is an American politician who has served in the Indiana House of Representatives from the 76th district since 2010.

McNamara earned a political science degree from the University of Indianapolis and a master's degree in educational leadership from the University of Southern Indiana.
