= Larry Bucshon =

American politician and physician (born 1962)

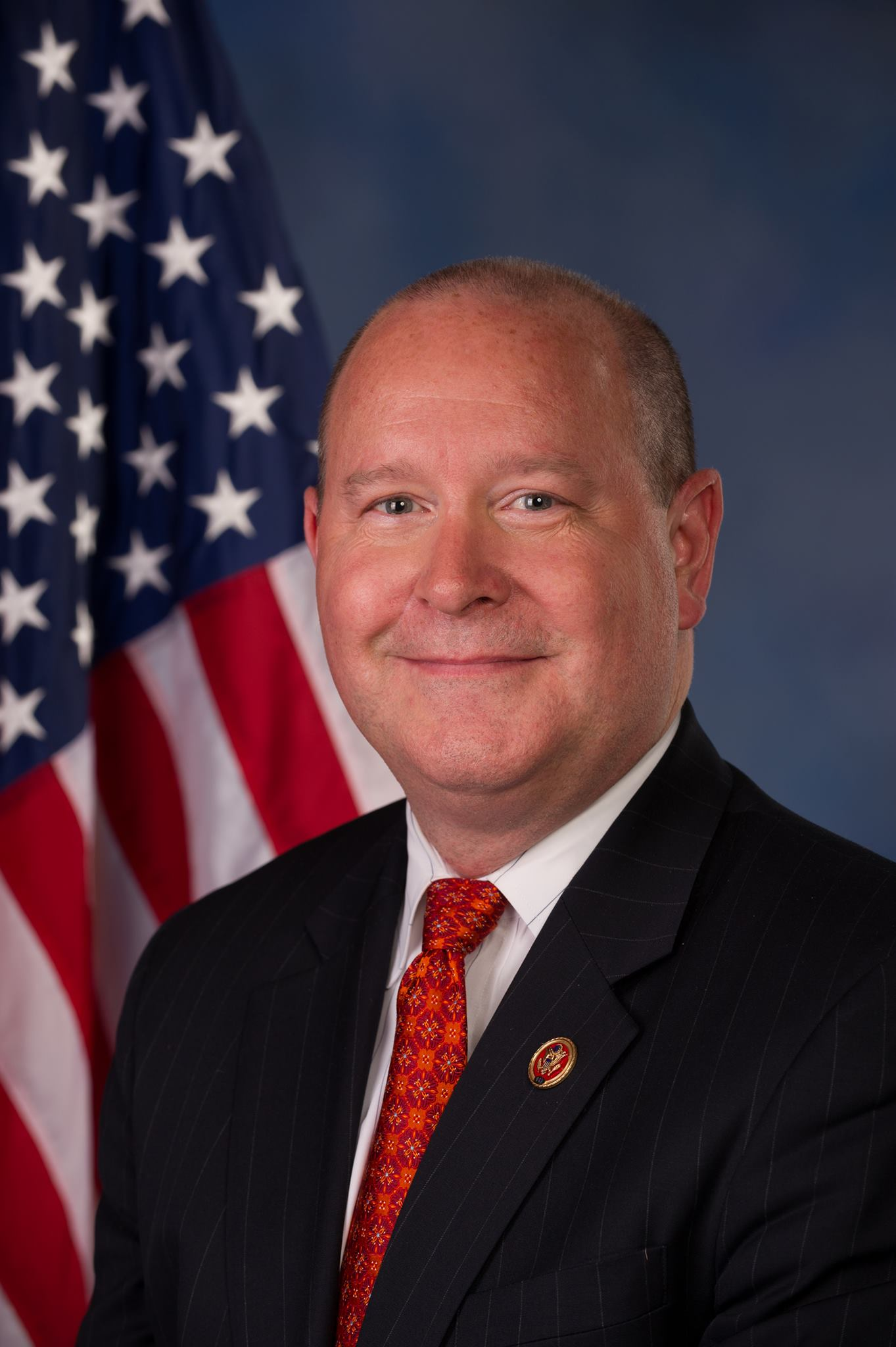
- Official portrait, 2013

Member of the U.S. House of Representatives from Indiana's 8th district
- In office January 3, 2011 – January 3, 2025
- Preceded by: Brad Ellsworth
- Succeeded by: Mark Messmer

Personal details
- Born: Larry Dean Bucshon; May 31, 1962 (age 64) Taylorville, Illinois, U.S.
- Party: Republican
- Spouse: Kathryn Bucshon
- Children: 4
- Education: University of Illinois, Urbana-Champaign (BS); University of Illinois, Chicago (MD)

Military service
- Branch/service: United States Navy
- Years of service: 1989–1998
- Unit: United States Navy Reserve

Larry Dean Bucshon (/buːˈʃɔːn/ boo-SHAWN; born May 31, 1962) is an American politician and physician who was the U.S. representative for Indiana's 8th congressional district from 2011 to 2025. He is a member of the Republican Party.

== Early life, education, and early career ==
Bucshon was born in Taylorville, Illinois on May 31, 1962, and raised in Kincaid, Illinois. His father, Ronald, was a coal miner, Navy serviceman, and lifelong Democrat; his mother, Barbara, was a nurse.

=== Education ===
Bucshon graduated from the University of Illinois at Urbana-Champaign and got his medical degree from the University of Illinois Medical School at Chicago. After medical school, he completed a residency at the Medical College of Wisconsin, where he served as chief resident in surgery and remained there to complete a fellowship in cardiothoracic surgery. He also received training at the Milwaukee Veterans Affairs Hospital.

=== Military service ===
During this time, he enlisted with the United States Navy Reserve, where he served for almost a decade.

== Medical career ==
Bucshon specialized in cardiothoracic surgery and has performed hundreds of heart surgeries. From 1995 to 1998, he was in private medical practice in Wichita, Kansas. Bucshon joined Ohio Valley HeartCare in 1998, where he served as the group's president. He was named St. Mary's Medical Staff Physician of the Year in 2007. He also served as Chief of Cardiothoracic Surgery and Medical Director of the open heart recovery intensive care unit at St. Mary's Hospital.

== U.S. House of Representatives ==
=== Elections ===
==== 2010 ====
Bucshon faced Democratic nominee State Representative Trent Van Haaften in the race to fill the seat vacated by Brad Ellsworth, who was running for Senate.

Bucshon received support from the National Republican Congressional Committee and was named a GOP Young Gun. During the campaign, he was endorsed by several conservative interest groups and elected officials, including the Indiana Chamber of Commerce Congressional Action Committee, United States Chamber of Commerce, National Right to Life Committee, Indiana Right to Life, Indiana Manufacturers Association, Campaign for Working Families, House Minority Leader John Boehner, U.S. Congressman Mike Pence, and Indiana Governor Mitch Daniels. Bucshon received significant campaign contributions from medical groups.

Bucshon defeated van Haaften by 21 points, winning all 18 counties in the district.

==== 2012 ====
Bucshon defeated Kristi Risk again in the Republican primary. Bucshon had defeated Risk in the 2010 primary, 16,262 votes to 14,273.

In the general election, Bucshon defeated former state representative Dave Crooks.

==== 2014 ====
The conservative Club for Growth announced that it would target Bucshon for defeat in the 2014 Republican primary, but he was reelected.

Bucshon is a member of the Republican Main Street Partnership.

=== Tenure and political positions ===
==== Taxes and spending ====
Bucshon voted for the Tax Cuts and Jobs Act of 2017. After voting, he said there would be "dramatic" economic growth that would "fully cover the amount of revenue decreases" from tax cuts. Bucshon claimed that people would file their taxes on a postcard.

Bucshon supports lower corporate and individual taxes. He has called for freezing spending at 2008 levels, extending the Bush tax cuts for all income brackets, and reviewing all government programs for places to reduce spending. He has said that Republicans need to "first admit we were partially to blame for the increased government spending over the past decade." Bucshon supports simplifying the personal and corporate tax codes.

Bucshon voted for the Budget Control Act of 2011, which created a Joint Select Committee on Deficit Reduction. He also supported a balanced budget amendment that would require the federal government to spend no more than it collects in revenue each year. During his 2010 campaign, Bucshon said one of his campaign goals was to lower taxes for all Americans.

In 2010, Bucshon signed a pledge sponsored by Americans for Prosperity promising to vote against any global warming legislation that would raise taxes.

==== Health care ====
Bucshon supports the repeal of the Affordable Health Care for America Act. He supports reforms that expand and reform high-risk pools and federal reinsurance programs and lower costs. Bucshon wants to increase transparency in medical care costs. He has called for cuts in health care programs.

==== Gun laws ====
Bucshon, who calls himself "an ardent supporter of protecting the Second Amendment", has supported several bills that loosen restrictions on gun ownership. He co-sponsored the National Right-to-Carry Reciprocity Act of 2011, which requires all states to honor concealed carry permits from other states within their borders, irrespective of their own gun laws. The National Rifle Association of America and the Gun Owners of America have both given Bucshon an "A" rating.

==== Abortion ====
Bucshon opposes abortion. During his time in Congress, he has supported bills that seek to establish a legal framework for challenging Roe v. Wade. He has said he believes that abortion should be legal in cases where the mother's life may be in danger. Bucshon co-sponsored the Life at Conception Act, which declares that life begins at the moment of conception and is entitled to legal protection from that point forward.

In October 2015, Bucshon was named to serve on the Select Investigative Panel on Planned Parenthood.

==== Social Security ====
Bucshon supports a comprehensive strategy to ensure the long-term sustainability of Social Security for current and future beneficiaries.

==== Energy ====
Bucshon calls himself a "long term friend of coal". His biggest contributors include Koch brothers and Murray energy. He supports the Keystone XL pipeline project.

==== Transportation ====
On November 2, 2011, the Evansville Courier & Press reported that Bucshon planned to introduce an amendment to the transportation funding bill that would allow governors to reallocate federal transportation funding from designated programs to projects they designate as emergencies.

==== Federal grants ====
On July 10, 2014, Bucshon introduced the Research and Development Efficiency Act (H.R. 5056), a bill that would instruct the Office of Science and Technology Policy to establish a working group under the authority of the National Science and Technology Council to review federal regulations affecting research and research universities and make recommendations on how to streamline them and reduce the regulatory burden on such researchers. Bucshon said his goal was "to alleviate some of the burden placed on our research universities so they can get back to their main goal of conducting basic science research."

==== Climate change ====
During a September 17, 2014, hearing of the Committee on Science, Space and Technology, Bucshon was questioning John Holdren, Director of the White House Office of Science and Technology Policy. When Holdren encouraged Bucshon to read the scientific literature on global warming, Bucshon replied, "Of all the climatologists whose careers depend on the climate changing to keep themselves publishing articles -- yes, I could read that, but I don't believe it."

==== Israel ====
Bucshon voted to provide Israel with support following 2023 Hamas attack on Israel.

=== Committee assignments ===
For the 118th Congress:

- Committee on Energy and Commerce
  - Subcommittee on Energy, Climate, and Grid Security
  - Subcommittee on Health
  - Subcommittee on Innovation, Data, and Commerce

=== Caucus memberships ===
- Congressional Constitution Caucus
- Republican Study Committee
- Republican Governance Group
- Republican Main Street Partnership
- Congressional Caucus on Turkey and Turkish Americans

== Personal life ==
Bucshon met his wife Kathryn, a practicing anesthesiologist in Evansville, during his medical residency. They now live in Newburgh with their four children. He is a member of Our Redeemer Lutheran Church (LCMS) in Evansville.

== Electoral history ==
2010 8th Congressional District of Indiana Elections
Party	Candidate	Votes	%	±%
Republican	Larry Bucshon	117,259	58	
Democratic	Trent Van Haaften	76,265	37	
Libertarian	John Cunningham	10,240	5	

2012 8th Congressional District of Indiana Elections
Party	Candidate	Votes	%	±%
Republican	Larry Bucshon	151,533	56	
Democratic	David Crooks	122,325	43	
Libertarian	Bart Gadau	10,134	4	

2014 8th Congressional District of Indiana Elections
Party	Candidate	Votes	%	±%
Republican	Larry Bucshon	103,344	60	
Democratic	Thomas R. Spangler	61,384	36	
Libertarian	Andrew Horning	6,587	4	

Indiana's 8th Congressional District election, 2016
Party	Candidate	Votes	%
Republican	Larry Bucshon (Incumbent)	187,702	63.69
Democratic	Ronald L. Drake	93,356	31.68
Libertarian	Andrew Horning	13,655	4.63
Total votes		294,713	100
Republican hold			

Indiana's 8th Congressional District election, 2018
Party	Candidate	Votes	%
Republican	Larry Bucshon (Incumbent)	157,396	64.4
Democratic	William Tanoos	86,895	35.6
Total votes		244,291	100
Republican hold			

Indiana's 8th congressional district, 2020
Party	Candidate	Votes	%
Republican	Larry Bucshon (incumbent)	214,643	66.9
Democratic	Thomasina Marsili	95,691	29.8
Libertarian	James D. Rodenberger	10,283	3.2
Total votes		320,617	100.0
Republican hold			

2022 Indiana's 8th congressional district election
Party	Candidate	Votes	%
Republican	Larry Bucshon (incumbent)	141,995	65.7
Democratic	Ray McCormick	68,109	31.5
Libertarian	Andrew Horning	5,936	2.7
Total votes		216,040	100.0
Republican hold			

== See also ==
- Physicians in the United States Congress

U.S. House of Representatives
Preceded by Brad Ellsworth	Member of the U.S. House of Representatives from Indiana's 8th congressional district 2011–2025	Succeeded by Mark Messmer
U.S. order of precedence (ceremonial)
Preceded by Bob Clement as Former U.S. Representative	Order of precedence of the United States as Former U.S. Representative	Succeeded by Jerry Weller as Former U.S. Representative
