= Trent Van Haaften =

American politician

Member of the Indiana House of Representatives from the 76th district
- In office January 1, 2004 - November 3, 2010
- Preceded by: Jonathan Weinzapfel
- Succeeded by: Wendy McNamara

Personal details
- Born: September 22, 1964 (age 62) Mount Vernon, Indiana
- Party: Democratic
- Spouse: Beverly Van Haaften
- Education: Lake Forest College, Drake University
- Profession: Lawyer

William Trent Van Haaften is a Democratic politician from the state of Indiana. He served as a member of the Indiana House of Representatives, representing the 76th District, from 2003 until 2010. He ran, in 2012, for his old seat.

== Early life, education and career ==
Van Haaften is a lifelong resident of Mount Vernon, west of Evansville. He graduated from Lake Forest College and Drake University School of Law.

== Indiana State Representative ==
In November 2003, state representative Jonathan Weinzapfel resigned to become mayor of Evansville. Van Haaften was appointed to fill out the remainder of Weinzapfel's term. He was elected in his own right in 2004, and was unopposed for reelection in 2006 and 2008.

He represented a district including the western two-thirds of Evansville, as well as several suburban areas west of the city, including all of his native Posey County. While in the State House Van Haaften earned a reputation as a bi-partisan legislator helping Gov. Mitch Daniels pass one of the country's toughest anti-methamphetamine laws in 2005. Van Haaften served as Chairman of the House Public Policy Committee and as deputy speaker pro tempore.

== 2010 U.S. Representative campaign ==
Upon Sen. Evan Bayh's announcement he would not seek re-election in 2010, two-term Democratic incumbent Brad Ellsworth decided to run for the United States Senate seat. Van Haaften easily won the nomination for Ellsworth's House seat.

Van Haaften was soundly defeated in the November election by Republican nominee Larry Bucshon, taking only 37 percent of the vote to Buchson's 57 percent. Van Haaften lost his own state house district, as well.

== 2012 State Representative campaign ==
In early 2012, Van Haaften decided to run for his old seat in the Indiana House of Representatives. He ran against Wendy McNamara, the Republican who succeeded him, and lost, taking only 43 percent of the vote to McNamara's 56 percent.
