= 2010 United States Senate election in Indiana =

- November 2, 2010
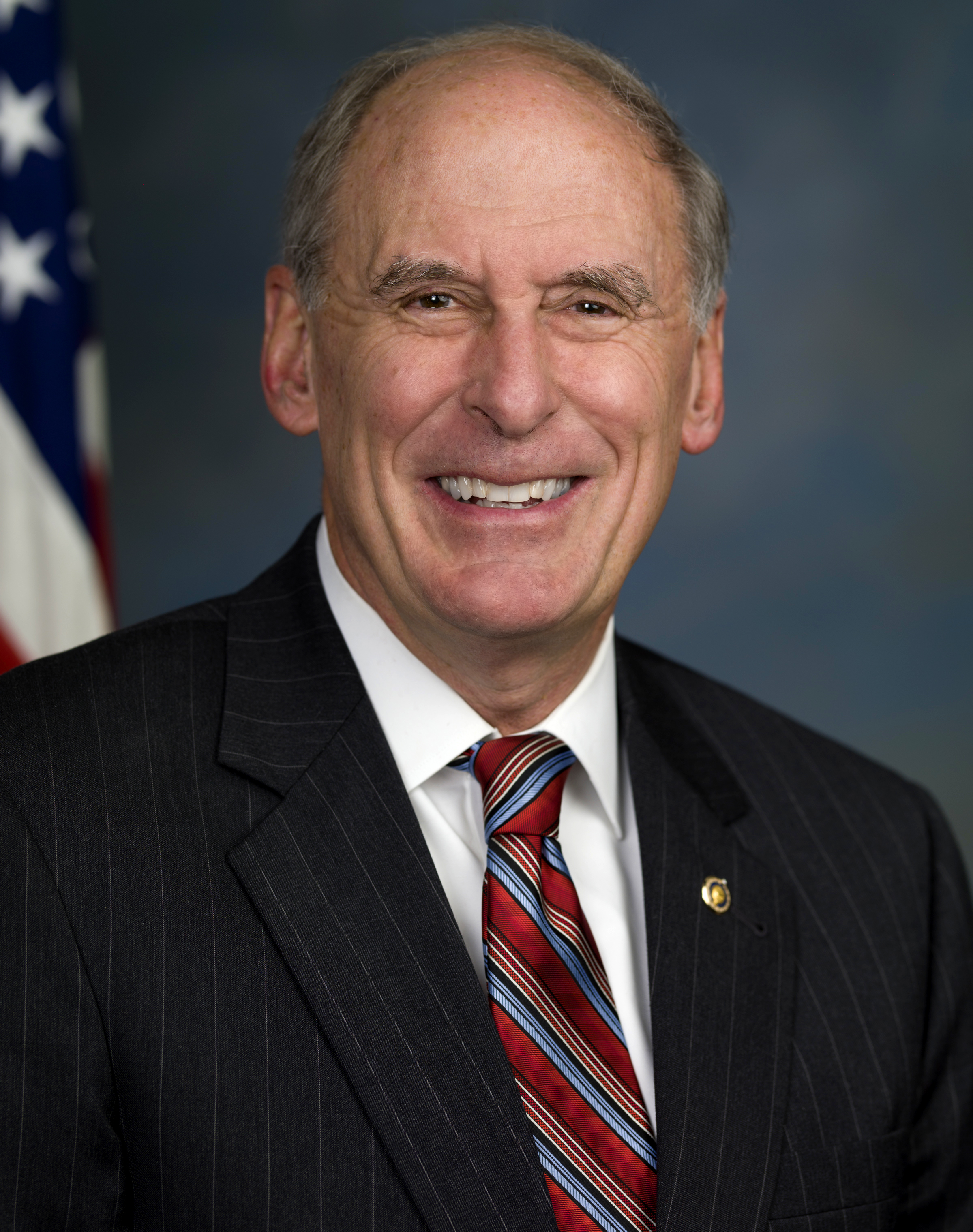

Nominee	Dan Coats	Brad Ellsworth	Rebecca Sink-Burris
Party	Republican	Democratic	Libertarian
Popular vote	952,116	697,775	94,330
Percentage	54.58%	40.00%	5.41%
- County results Coats: 40–50% 50–60%. 60–70% 70–80% Ellsworth: 40–50% 50–60%
U.S. senator before election
Evan Bayh
Democratic
Elected U.S. Senator
Dan Coats
Republican

The 2010 United States Senate election in Indiana took place on November 2, 2010, alongside 33 other elections to the United States Senate in other states, elections to the United States House of Representatives, and various state and local elections, to fill Indiana's class III United States Senate seat.

Incumbent Democratic Senator Evan Bayh decided in February 2010 to retire instead of seeking a third term, shortly after Dan Coats announced his candidacy. Bayh's announcement came one day before the filing deadline, and no Democratic candidate submitted enough signatures by the deadline to run, so the State Democratic Party chose U.S. Congressman Brad Ellsworth as their nominee. The Libertarian Party nominated YMCA instructor Rebecca Sink-Burris, who had previously unsuccessfully run for this seat in 1998. Coats won the open seat, having previously held it from 1989 to 1999. Bayh later unsuccessfully ran for this seat again in 2016.

== Democratic nomination ==
Senate candidates in Indiana were required to have submitted 500 signatures from each of the state's nine congressional districts by February 16, 2010, one day after Bayh announced his retirement. Democratic leaders thought the popular incumbent would run for reelection, and as a result, no Democratic candidate had submitted the requisite signatures by the deadline to run in the state's primary, meaning that the Indiana Democratic Party's executive committee chose the party's nominee. U.S. Congressman Brad Ellsworth was officially selected on May 15.

== Republican primary ==
=== Candidates ===
- Don Bates, businessman
- Richard Behney, businessman
- Dan Coats, former U.S. senator
- John Hostettler, former U.S. representative
- Marlin Stutzman, state senator

=== Debates ===
1. March 6
2. April 8 (on the WXNT radio station)
3. April 10
4. April 19 (at Franklin College, on radio station WFCI)
5. April 20 (televised on WFYI)

=== Endorsements ===
==== Coats ====
Dan Coats

Individuals

- Bill Bennett, former secretary of education
- James Dobson, founder of Focus on the Family
- Jon Kyl, U.S. senator, Arizona
- Mike Pence, U.S. representative, Indiana

Organizations

- National Republican Senatorial Committee

Newspapers

- The Journal Gazette

==== Hostettler ====
John Hostettler

Individuals

- Dick Armey, former U.S. House majority leader, Texas
- Ron Paul, U.S. representative, Texas
- Tom Tancredo, former U.S. representative, Colorado

Organizations

- Gun Owners of America
- Republican Liberty Caucus
- Team America PAC

Publications

- Indiana's Conservative Hardball Blog

==== Stutzman ====
Marlin Stutzman

Individuals

- Jim DeMint, U.S. senator (R-SC)
- Mike Huckabee, former governor of Arkansas
- David Keene, chairman of the American Conservative Union
- David C. Long, state senator
- Mark E. Souder, U.S. representative

=== Polling ===
Poll source	Date(s) administered	Sample size	Margin of error	Dan Coats	John Hostettler	Marlin Stutzman	Other	Undecided
Survey USA (report)	April 29, 2010	407	± 5.0%	36%	24%	18%	10%	13%

=== Results ===
Results by county: Coats: 60–70%; 50–60%; 40–50%; <40%; Stutzman: <40%; 40–50%; 50–60%; 60–70%; Hostettler: 30–40%; 40–50%; 50–60%; 60–70%; 70–80%

Republican primary results
Party	Candidate	Votes	%
Republican	Dan Coats	217,225	39.5%
Republican	Marlin Stutzman	160,981	29.2%
Republican	John Hostettler	124,494	22.6%
Republican	Don Bates Jr.	24,664	4.5%
Republican	Richard Behney	23,005	4.2%
Total votes		550,369	100.0%

== General election ==
=== Candidates ===
- Dan Coats (R), former U.S. senator
- Brad Ellsworth (D), U.S. representative
- Rebecca Sink-Burris (L), teacher and small business owner

=== Campaign ===
After Coats' win in the Republican primary, Ellsworth began to heavily criticize Coats for his ties to lobbyists. He called for more disclosure of the meetings lawmakers have with lobbyists, banning congressional staff from lobbying for six years after their congressional jobs, requiring Congress members to put all their investments in blind trusts, more disclosure of Senate candidates' personal financial information, and changes to the U.S. Senate filibuster rules. He proposed lowering number of votes required to break a filibuster to 55 from the current 60. In response to Ellsworth's charges, Coats published his lobbying record in an 815-page document.

Coats emphasized the individual issues rather than ethic reforms advocated by his opponent. He focused on Ellsworth's record of voting in support of the Economic Stimulus Act of 2008, cap and trade legislation, and health care bill. Coats opinion of the healthcare law was that "the only responsible solution ... is to repeal the Obama-Pelosi-Ellsworth health spending bill and quickly replace it with cost-effective, incremental pieces that will decrease costs, increase coverage and not break the bank."

=== Debates ===
The three candidates took part in three televised debates.

- Monday, October 11, in Indianapolis
- Friday, October 22, in Fort Wayne
- Monday, October 25, in Vincennes

=== Predictions ===
Source	Ranking	As of
Cook Political Report	Safe R (flip)	October 30, 2010
Rothenberg	Lean R (flip)	October 28, 2010
RealClearPolitics	Likely R (flip)	October 30, 2010
Sabato's Crystal Ball	Likely R (flip)	October 28, 2010
CQ Politics	Safe R (flip)	October 30, 2010

=== Polling ===
Poll source	Date(s) administered	Sample size	Margin of error	Dan Coats (R)	Brad Ellsworth (D)	Other	Unde cided
Rasmussen Reports	February 16–17, 2010	500	± 3.5%	46%	32%	7%	15%
Research 2000	February 22–24, 2010	600	± 4.0%	37%	36%	—	27%
Rasmussen Reports	March 17–18, 2010	500	± 4.5%	49%	34%	6%	12%
Rasmussen Reports	April 13–14, 2010	500	± 3.5%	54%	33%	5%	9%
SurveyUSA	April 22–26, 2010	407	± 5.0%	47%	31%	—	22%
Rasmussen Reports	May 5–6, 2010	500	± 4.5%	51%	36%	6%	8%
Rasmussen Reports	June 2–3, 2010	500	± 4.5%	47%	33%	7%	14%
Rasmussen Reports	July 7–8, 2010	500	± 4.5%	51%	30%	6%	12%
The Polling Company	July 11–15, 2010	502	± 4.2%	51%	25%	—	14%
The Polling Company	July 31 – August 3, 2010	502	± 4.2%	50%	35%	—	14%
Rasmussen Reports	August 4–7, 2010	500	± 4.5%	50%	29%	7%	14%
Rasmussen Reports	September 14–15, 2010	500	± 4.5%	50%	34%	8%	9%
WISH-TV/EPIC-MRA	September 29 – October 1, 2010	500	± 4.4%	51%	33%	5%	11%
Rasmussen Reports	October 20, 2010	500	± 4.5%	52%	34%	5%	9%
WISH-TV/EPIC-MRA	October 19–21, 2010	500	± 4.4%	53%	35%	5%	7%
SurveyUSA	October 21–25, 2010	1,600	± 3.0%	54%	32%	7%	3%
Indiana Times	October 29, 2010	1,600	± 3.0%	60%	32%	4%	3%
Rasmussen Reports	October 30 – November 1, 2010	1,600	± 3.0%	60%	39%	4%	3%

=== Fundraising ===
Candidate (party)	Receipts	Disbursements	Cash on hand	Debt
Dan Coats (R)	$4,408,537	$3,384,413	$1,024,123	$185,500
Brad Ellsworth (D)	$2,256,505	$2,369,943	$119,329	$22,726
Rebecca Sink-Burris (L)	$7,331	$2,175	$5,351	$0
Source: Federal Election Commission

=== Results ===

2010 United States Senate election in Indiana
Party	Candidate	Votes	%	±%
Republican	Dan Coats	952,116	54.58%	+17.35%
Democratic	Brad Ellsworth	697,775	40.00%	−21.65%
Libertarian	Rebecca Sink-Burris	94,330	5.41%	+4.28%
Write-in		260	0.01%	N/A
Total votes		1,744,481	100.0%	
Republican gain from Democratic				

==== Results by county ====
County	Dan Coats Republican		Brad Ellsworth Democratic		Rebecca Sink-Burris Libertarian		Write-ins		Margin		Total
County	Votes	%	Votes	%	Votes	%	Votes	%	Votes	%	Total
Adams	6,181	64.9%	2,880	30.2%	465	4.9%	0	0.0%	3,301	34.7%	9,526
Allen	55,454	61.0%	31,347	34.5%	4,125	4.4%	31	0.1%	24,107	26.5%	90,957
Bartholomew	12,243	61.9%	6,492	32.8%	1,035	5.2%	6	0.1%	5,751	31.1%	19,776
Benton	1,432	63.3%	667	29.5%	160	7.1%	2	0.1%	765	33.8%	2,261
Blackford	2,068	53.7%	1,551	40.3%	230	6.0%	0	0.0%	517	13.4%	3,849
Boone	12,773	66.7%	4,944	25.8%	1,419	7.4%	0	0.0%	7,829	40.9%	19,136
Brown	3,201	51.2%	2,608	41.7%	439	7.0%	0	0.0%	593	9.5%	6,248
Carroll	3,566	59.8%	1,883	31.6%	512	8.6%	2	0.0%	1,683	28.2%	5,963
Cass	6,361	58.8%	3,673	34.0%	775	7.2%	2	0.0%	2,688	24.8%	10,811
Clark	17,773	54.5%	13,429	41.2%	1,409	4.3%	2	0.0%	4,344	13.3%	32,613
Clay	4,543	55.4%	3,187	38.9%	465	5.7%	1	0.0%	1,356	16.5%	8,196
Clinton	4,618	62.3%	2,222	30.0%	570	7.7%	2	0.0%	2,396	32.3%	7,412
Crawford	1,803	48.1%	1,755	46.8%	192	5.1%	0	0.0%	48	1.3%	3,750
Daviess	4,690	66.7%	2,061	29.3%	283	4.0%	0	0.0%	2,629	37.4%	7,034
Dearborn	10,589	70.4%	3,776	25.1%	663	4.4%	4	0.1%	6,813	45.3%	15,032
Decatur	4,838	63.3%	2,283	29.9%	526	6.9%	0	0.0%	2,555	33.4%	7,647
DeKalb	7,351	63.9%	3,479	30.2%	671	5.8%	0	0.0%	3,872	33.7%	11,501
Delaware	14,720	48.0%	14,414	47.0%	1,547	5.0%	0	0.0%	306	1.0%	30,681
Dubois	7,059	50.5%	6,344	45.3%	588	4.2%	0	0.0%	715	5.2%	13,991
Elkhart	30,546	66.3%	13,867	30.1%	1,680	3.6%	1	0.0%	16,679	36.2%	46,094
Fayette	3,154	50.2%	2,618	41.7%	511	8.1%	0	0.0%	536	8.5%	6,283
Floyd	14,529	56.5%	10,238	39.8%	944	3.7%	0	0.0%	4,291	16.7%	25,711
Fountain	3,178	59.1%	1,837	34.2%	364	6.8%	0	0.0%	1,341	24.9%	5,379
Franklin	4,858	67.3%	1,976	27.4%	389	5.4%	0	0.0%	2,882	39.9%	7,223
Fulton	3,854	62.9%	1,977	32.3%	298	4.9%	0	0.0%	1,877	30.6%	6,129
Gibson	6,308	55.2%	4,644	40.6%	478	4.2%	1	0.0%	1,664	14.6%	11,341
Grant	9,684	60.5%	5,433	33.9%	894	5.6%	0	0.0%	4,251	26.6%	16,011
Greene	5,281	53.5%	4,079	41.4%	504	5.1%	0	0.0%	1,202	12.1%	9,864
Hamilton	54,675	67.7%	20,658	25.6%	5,380	6.7%	11	0.0%	34,017	42.1%	80,724
Hancock	14,367	63.5%	6,325	28.0%	1,930	8.5%	4	0.0%	8,042	35.5%	22,626
Harrison	8,362	57.2%	5,569	38.1%	679	4.6%	1	0.1%	2,793	19.1%	14,611
Hendricks	26,072	67.2%	9,896	25.5%	2,815	7.3%	20	0.1%	16,176	41.7%	38,803
Henry	7,192	54.3%	4,944	37.3%	1,107	8.4%	0	0.0%	2,248	17.0%	13,243
Howard	14,212	55.2%	9,734	37.8%	1,789	7.0%	4	0.0%	4,478	17.4%	25,739
Huntington	7,731	69.0%	2,717	24.3%	752	6.7%	0	0.0%	5,014	44.7%	11,200
Jackson	7,838	58.1%	4,826	35.8%	831	6.1%	3	0.0%	3,012	22.3%	13,498
Jasper	5,329	64.9%	2,505	30.5%	379	4.6%	2	0.0%	2,824	34.4%	8,215
Jay	3,432	59.5%	1,986	34.4%	352	6.1%	1	0.0%	1,446	25.1%	5,771
Jefferson	5,447	54.4%	3,981	39.8%	584	5.8%	1	0.0%	1,416	14.6%	5,771
Jennings	4,725	56.3%	3,161	37.7%	500	6.0%	1	0.0%	1,564	18.6%	8,387
Johnson	25,462	66.5%	9,813	25.6%	2,981	7.8%	12	0.1%	15,649	40.9%	38,268
Knox	5,604	49.1%	5,230	45.9%	569	5.0%	0	0.0%	374	3.2%	11,403
Kosciusko	14,936	74.9%	3,917	19.6%	1,081	5.4%	5	0.1%	11,019	55.3%	19,939
LaGrange	4,420	67.9%	1,733	26.6%	358	5.5%	0	0.0%	2,687	41.3%	6,511
Lake	44,232	39.2%	65,767	58.4%	2,702	2.4%	0	0.0%	-21,535	-19.2%	112,701
LaPorte	13,597	47.3%	13,627	47.4%	1,528	5.3%	0	0.0%	-30	-0.1%	28,752
Lawrence	6,963	63.0%	3,343	30.2%	748	6.8%	0	0.0%	3,620	32.8%	11,054
Madison	18,848	48.2%	17,694	45.3%	2,553	6.5%	4	0.0%	1,154	2.9%	39,099
Marion	88,564	41.4%	113,634	53.1%	11,879	5.5%	0	0.0%	-25,070	-11.7%	214,077
Marshall	8,280	62.6%	4,362	33.0%	580	4.4%	0	0.0%	3,918	29.6%	13,222
Martin	2,189	52.9%	1,719	41.5%	231	5.6%	0	0.0%	470	11.4%	4,139
Miami	5,275	60.5%	2,612	30.0%	828	9.5%	0	0.0%	2,663	30.5%	8,715
Monroe	14,336	40.0%	19,797	55.2%	1,698	4.7%	10	0.1%	-5,461	-15.2%	35,841
Montgomery	6,396	59.9%	3,051	28.6%	1,231	11.5%	1	0.0%	3,345	41.3%	10,679
Morgan	11,961	66.3%	4,436	24.6%	1,626	9.0%	10	0.1%	7,525	41.7%	18,033
Newton	2,593	61.7%	1,397	33.2%	215	5.1%	0	0.0%	1,196	28.5%	4,205
Noble	7,167	63.6%	3,443	30.5%	666	5.9%	0	0.0%	3,724	33.1%	11,276
Ohio	1,302	59.2%	789	35.9%	109	5.0%	0	0.0%	513	23.3%	2,200
Orange	3,405	58.3%	2,142	36.7%	296	5.1%	0	0.0%	1,263	21.7%	5,843
Owen	3,353	54.7%	2,329	38.0%	452	7.4%	0	0.0%	1,024	16.7%	6,134
Parke	2,898	53.6%	2,120	39.2%	393	7.3%	0	0.0%	778	14.4%	5,411
Perry	2,484	36.9%	3,939	58.5%	306	4.5%	3	0.1%	-1,455	-21.6%	6,732
Pike	2,294	47.7%	2,288	47.6%	226	4.7%	0	0.0%	6	0.1%	6,732
Porter	23,723	53.8%	18,556	42.1%	1,832	4.1%	12	0.0%	5,167	11.7%	44,123
Posey	5,144	52.1%	4,418	44.7%	318	3.2%	0	0.0%	726	7.4%	9,880
Pulaski	2,762	61.1%	1,512	33.4%	245	5.4%	4	0.1%	1,250	27.7%	4,523
Putnam	5,964	58.7%	3,452	34.0%	738	7.3%	1	0.0%	2,512	24.7%	10,155
Randolph	4,201	60.5%	2,185	31.5%	559	8.0%	0	0.0%	2,016	29.0%	6,945
Ripley	5,580	67.1%	2,323	27.9%	418	5.0%	0	0.0%	3,257	39.2%	8,321
Rush	2,987	60.5%	1,421	28.8%	530	10.7%	1	0.0%	1,566	31.7%	4,939
Scott	3,329	47.9%	3,215	46.2%	409	5.9%	2	0.0%	114	1.7%	6,955
Shelby	6,597	61.7%	3,200	29.9%	896	8.4%	0	0.0%	3,397	31.8%	10,693
Spencer	3,674	49.3%	3,486	46.7%	291	3.9%	7	0.1%	188	2.6%	7,458
St. Joseph	39,111	49.3%	37,563	47.3%	2,661	3.4%	7	0.0%	1,548	2.0%	79,342
Starke	3,557	51.2%	3,050	43.9%	343	4.9%	0	0.0%	507	7.3%	6,950
Steuben	6,149	61.2%	3,297	32.8%	598	6.0%	0	0.0%	2,852	28.4%	10,044
Sullivan	2,681	41.6%	3,392	52.6%	372	5.8%	0	0.0%	-711	-9.0%	6,445
Switzerland	1,583	53.6%	1,215	41.1%	155	5.2%	0	0.0%	368	12.5%	2,953
Tippecanoe	19,494	54.6%	14,078	39.4%	2,106	5.9%	15	0.1%	5,416	15.2%	35,693
Tipton	3,512	59.8%	1,929	32.8%	435	7.4%	0	0.0%	1,583	27.0%	5,876
Union	1,590	66.1%	658	27.4%	157	6.5%	0	0.0%	932	38.7%	2,405
Vanderburgh	26,372	52.4%	22,305	44.3%	1,591	3.2%	42	0.1%	4,067	8.1%	50,310
Vermillion	1,991	40.5%	2,613	53.2%	309	6.3%	2	0.0%	-622	-12.7%	4,915
Vigo	12,443	43.5%	14,771	51.7%	1,380	4.8%	1	0.0%	-2,328	-8.2%	28,595
Wabash	5,666	63.4%	2,571	28.7%	706	7.9%	0	0.0%	3,095	34.7%	8,943
Warren	1,530	59.3%	896	34.7%	156	6.0%	0	0.0%	634	24.6%	2,582
Warrick	11,771	57.0%	8,207	39.8%	661	3.2%	0	0.0%	3,564	17.2%	20,639
Washington	4,844	58.2%	2,975	35.8%	495	6.0%	4	0.0%	1,869	22.4%	8,318
Wayne	9,602	58.2%	5,386	32.6%	1,506	9.1%	3	0.1%	4,216	25.6%	16,497
Wells	6,401	67.4%	2,471	26.0%	620	6.5%	3	0.1%	3,930	41.4%	9,495
White	4,393	59.1%	2,377	32.0%	658	8.8%	4	0.1%	2,016	27.1%	7,432
Whitley	6,869	64.4%	3,105	29.1%	695	6.5%	5	0.0%	3,764	35.3%	10,674
Total	952,116	54.6%	697,775	40.0%	94,330	5.4%	260	0.0%	254,341	14.6%	1,744,481

Counties that flipped from Democratic to Republican

- Delaware (largest city: Muncie)
- Porter (largest city: Portage)
- Madison (largest city: Anderson)
- Spencer (largest city: Santa Claus)
- Starke (largest city: Knox)
- Tippecanoe (largest city: Lafayette)
- Vanderburgh (largest city: Evansville)
- Scott (largest city: Scottsburg)
- Blackford (largest city: Hartford City)
- Clark (largest city: Jeffersonville)
- Crawford (largest city: Marengo)
- Floyd (largest city: New Albany)
- Gibson (largest city: Princeton)
- Jefferson (largest city: Madison)
- Knox (largest city: Vincennes)
- Pike (largest city: Petersburg)
- Posey (largest city: Mount Vernon)
- Switzerland (largest city: Vevay)
- Warrick (largest city: Boonville)
- Adams (largest city: Decatur)
- Allen (largest city: Fort Wayne)
- Bartholomew (largest city: Columbus)
- Benton (largest city: Fowler)
- Brown (largest city: Nashville)
- Carroll (largest city: Delphi)
- Cass (largest city: Logansport)
- Clay (largest city: Brazil)
- Clinton (largest city: Frankfort)
- Daviess (largest city: Washington)
- Decatur (largest city: Greensburg)
- DeKalb (largest city: Auburn)
- Dubois (largest city: Jasper)
- Elkhart (largest city: Elkhart)
- Fayette (largest city: Connersville)
- Fountain (largest city: Attica)
- Franklin (largest city: Brookville)
- Fulton (largest city: Rochester)
- Grant (largest city: Marion)
- Greene (largest city: Linton)
- Hancock (largest city: Greenfield)
- Harrison (largest city: Corydon)
- Henry (largest city: New Castle)
- Howard (largest city: Kokomo)
- Huntington (largest city: Huntington)
- Jackson (largest city: Seymour)
- Jay (largest city: Portland)
- Jennings (largest city: North Vernon)
- Johnson (largest city: Greenwood)
- LaGrange (largest city: LaGrange)
- Lawrence (largest city: Bedford)
- Marshall (largest city: Plymouth)
- Martin (largest city: Loogootee)
- Miami (largest city: Peru)
- Montgomery (largest city: Crawfordsville)
- Morgan (largest city: Martinsville)
- Newton (largest city: Kentland)
- Noble (largest city: Kendallville)
- Ohio (largest city: Rising Sun)
- Orange (largest city: Paoli)
- Owen (largest city: Spencer)
- Parke (largest city: Rockville)
- Pulaski (largest city: Winamac)
- Putnam (largest city: Greencastle)
- Randolph (largest city: Winchester)
- Ripley (largest city: Batesville)
- Rush (largest city: Rushville)
- St. Joseph (largest city: South Bend)
- Shelby (largest city: Shelbyville)
- Steuben (largest city: Angola)
- Tipton (largest city: Tipton)
- Union (largest city: Liberty)
- Wabash (largest city: Wabash)
- Warren (largest city: Williamsport)
- Washington (largest city: Salem)
- Wayne (largest city: Richmond)
- Wells (largest city: Bluffton)
- White (largest city: Monticello)
- Whitley (largest city: Columbia City)

== See also ==
- 2010 Indiana elections
- 2010 United States Senate elections
