= Brad Ellsworth =

American politician (born 1958)

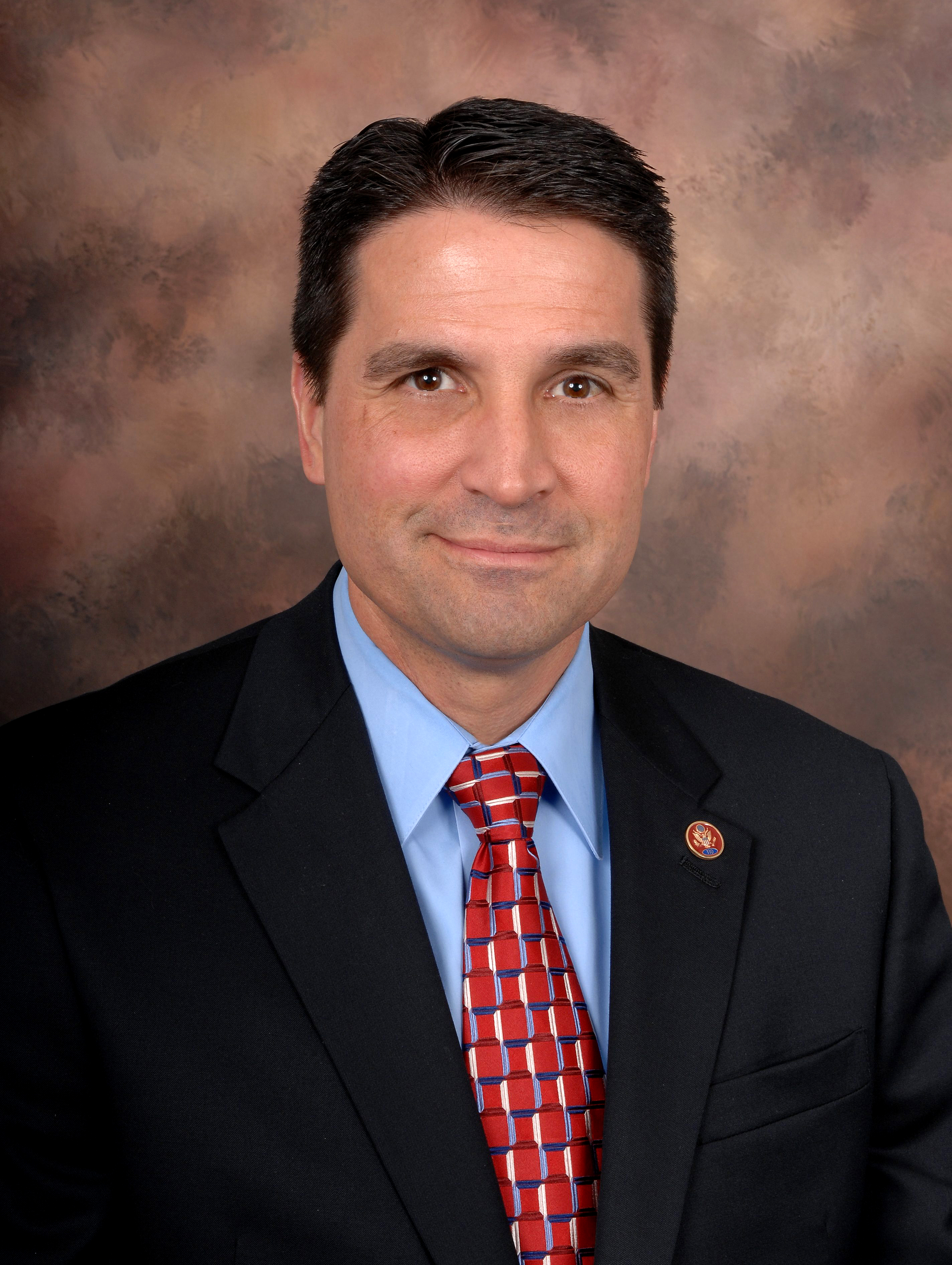
- Official portrait, 2007

Member of the U.S. House of Representatives from Indiana's 8th district
- In office January 3, 2007 – January 3, 2011
- Preceded by: John Hostettler
- Succeeded by: Larry Bucshon

Sheriff of Vanderburgh County
- In office January 6, 1999 – January 3, 2007
- Preceded by: Ray Hamner
- Succeeded by: Eric Williams

Personal details
- Born: John Bradley Ellsworth; September 11, 1958 (age 67) Jasper, Indiana, U.S.
- Party: Democratic
- Spouse: Shannon Ellsworth
- Children: 1
- Education: University of Southern Indiana (BS); Indiana State University (MS)

John Bradley Ellsworth (born September 11, 1958) is an American politician who was the U.S. representative for Indiana's 8th congressional district from 2007 to 2011. In 2010, he was the Democratic candidate for a seat in the United States Senate, but he was defeated by former Senator Dan Coats.

== Early life and education ==
Ellsworth was born in Jasper, Indiana, the son of Margaret (née Scherle) and Jim Ellsworth. He is the youngest of four siblings. His brother Eric is the president and CEO of the YMCA of greater Indianapolis. His brother Joe is a founding partner and president of Fire & Rain Marketing/Communications headquartered in Evansville.

Ellsworth graduated from William Henry Harrison High School in 1976. He received a bachelor's degree in sociology from the University of Southern Indiana and was a member of Sigma Tau Gamma. He also received a master's degree in criminology from Indiana State University. Rose-Hulman Institute of Technology gave him an honorary doctorate of humane letters at their 2008 commencement.

== Law enforcement career ==
In 1982, Ellsworth began working for the Vanderburgh County Sheriff's Department.

In 2005, he announced that he would be running in the Democratic primary for Indiana's 8th congressional district, which was then held by six-term Republican incumbent John Hostettler.

== U.S. House of Representatives ==
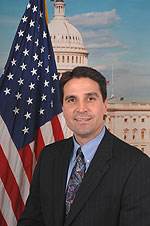
Congressman Brad Ellsworth during the 110th Congress

Ellsworth is a conservative Democrat with a populist streak. He opposes abortion and gun control. Ellsworth also represented a socially conservative swath of Indiana. However, on economic issues, Ellsworth usually voted more with the Democratic party. After his election to Congress, he joined the Blue Dog Coalition.

Ellsworth voted against the American Recovery and Reinvestment Act of 2009 in January of that year. He voted for the final version of the American Recovery and Reinvestment Act of 2009.

He was one of 16 Democrats who voted against providing federal funds for embryonic stem cell research.

Ellsworth condemned the National Right to Life Committee for not supporting the extension of the State Children's Health Insurance Program (SCHIP) to cover more families. While Ellsworth voted against an earlier version of the bill, he joined the other nine signatories in voting for the final bill.

In July 2007, Ellsworth designated $2 million to extend the John T. Myers lock chamber on the Ohio River and $750,000 for manufacturing and engineering equipment for the University of Southern Indiana. Two other projects Ellsworth brought to southwestern Indiana were the construction of a campus perimeter road system at USI for $350,000 and a portion of University Parkway construction also at $350,000.

In November 2009, Ellsworth wrote an amendment restricting federal funding for elective abortions. Americans United for Life asserted that this language does not eliminate the public funding of abortion in the House bill, but instead only requires said federal subsidies to be separately disbursed by an independent contractor. Ellsworth later voted for the Stupak Amendment. He eventually voted for the Senate language of the healthcare bill lacking the Stupak Amendment's anti-abortion language.

Smaller projects for which Ellsworth gained House approval include $200,000 to restore Evansville's Alhambra Theater, $135,000 for emergency warning sirens in Vanderburgh County and $75,000 to train utility workers at Ivy Tech Community College.

=== Committee assignments ===
- Committee on Agriculture
  - Subcommittee on Conservation, Credit, Energy, and Research
  - Subcommittee on General Farm Commodities and Risk Management
- Committee on Armed Services
  - Subcommittee on Seapower and Expeditionary Forces
  - Subcommittee on Terrorism and Unconventional Threats
- Committee on Small Business
  - Subcommittee on Contracting and Technology
  - Subcommittee on Investigations and Oversight

== Political campaigns ==
=== 2006 ===
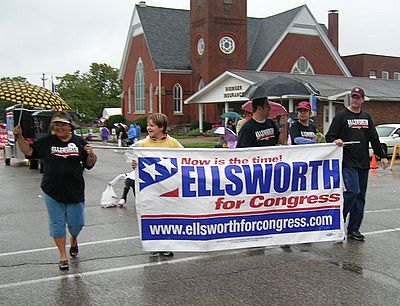
Parade for Ellsworth

As of June 30, 2006, Hostettler had raised $287,000 and had $195,000 on hand, compared to Ellsworth's $1,036,000 raised and $676,000 on hand. However, Hostettler had won several campaigns against opponents with more funding than him. In addition, the National Republican Congressional Committee had spent $163,000 in his district as of mid-July 2006. (The DCCC, its counterpart, had spent $166,000 for Ellsworth as of that date.)

The Cook Political Report, an independent non-partisan newsletter, listed the race as a toss-up as of mid-August. As of early September, the Rothenberg Political Report called Hostettler one of the three most endangered House incumbents in the country; Chris Cillizza, political analyst for The Washington Post, ranked Hostettler as the most vulnerable House incumbent in the nation; and Robert D. Novak, a syndicated columnist and editor of the Evans-Novak Political Report, also rated Hostettler's seat a likely win for Ellsworth.

In mid-October, an opinion poll commissioned by the Evansville Courier & Press showed Ellsworth leading Hostettler, 55% to 32%.

Hostettler debated Ellsworth on October 23, 2006. The debate was at public television station WVUT at Vincennes University, and involved the League of Women Voters.

Ellsworth won a landslide victory on November 7, 2006. He took 61% of the vote to Hostettler's 39%, which was by far the largest defeat for a House incumbent in the 2006 election. The seat was the first of 30 to flip from Republican to Democratic in the 2006 cycle.

=== 2008 ===
Two years later, on November 4, 2008, Ellsworth won reelection, easily defeating Republican candidate Greg Goode 65% to 35%.

=== 2010 U.S. Senate campaign ===
On February 19, 2010, Ellsworth announced his candidacy in the 2010 U.S. Senate election for the seat in the United States Senate held by Democrat Evan Bayh, who was retiring. Since Bayh made his announcement the day before the deadline for filing for the primary, no Democrat was able to gather a sufficient number of signatures to qualify for the primary ballot, forcing the Democratic state committee to choose the Senate nominee. Ultimately, the committee chose Ellsworth.

He was defeated in the November election by Dan Coats, who had previously held the seat from 1989 to 1999, taking 40 percent of the vote. Ellsworth even lost his own congressional district; he carried Vigo County (home to Terre Haute) but failed to carry his home county of Vanderburgh. State representative Trent Van Haaften replaced Ellsworth on the ballot for the 8th, but lost to Republican Larry Bucshon with only 37 percent of the vote. The Democrats have crossed the 40 percent mark in the district only once since Ellsworth left office.

Following his defeat, Ellsworth joined Evansville-based Vectren Corporation as president of its southern Indiana gas and electric utility division.

== Electoral history ==
United States House of Representatives General Election, 2006 Indiana's 8th congressional district
Party	Candidate	Votes	%	±%
Democratic	Brad Ellsworth	131,019	61.0%	
Republican	John Hostettler (incumbent)	83,704	39.0%	
Turnout		214,723	46%	
Democratic gain from Republican		Swing		

United States House of Representatives General Election, 2008 Indiana's 8th congressional district
Party	Candidate	Votes	%	±%
Democratic	Brad Ellsworth (incumbent)	188,693	64.7%	+3.7%
Republican	Greg Goode	102,769	35.3%	
Turnout		291,462	60%	
Democratic hold		Swing		

United States Senate General election results, 2010 Indiana's Class III Senate Seat
Party	Candidate	Votes	%	±%
Republican	Dan Coats	952,116	54.60%	+17.37%
Democratic	Brad Ellsworth	697,775	40.01%	−21.64%
Libertarian	Rebecca Sink-Burris	94,330	5.39%	+4.27%
Majority		254,341	14.58%	
Total votes		1,743,921	100	
Republican gain from Democratic		Swing		

U.S. House of Representatives
Preceded by John Hostettler	Member of the U.S. House of Representatives from Indiana's 8th congressional district 2007–2011	Succeeded by Larry Bucshon
Party political offices
Preceded by Evan Bayh	Democratic nominee for U.S. Senator from Indiana (Class 3); 2010	Succeeded by Baron Hill; Withdrew
U.S. order of precedence (ceremonial)
Preceded by Chris Chocola as Former U.S. Representative	Order of precedence of the United States as Former U.S. Representative	Succeeded by Webb Franklin as Former U.S. Representative
