= 2004 United States House of Representatives elections in Indiana =

- November 2, 2004

All 9 Indiana seats to the United States House of Representatives
	Majority party	Minority party
Party	Republican	Democratic
Last election	6	3
Seats won	7	2
Seat change	▲1	▼1
Popular vote	1,381,699	999,082
Percentage	57.18%	41.35%
Swing	▲1.92%	▼0.76%

Republican
40–50%
50–60%
60–70%
70–80%
80–90%
Democratic
40–50%
50–60%
60–70%
70–80%

The 2004 congressional elections in Indiana were elections for Indiana's delegation to the United States House of Representatives, which occurred along with congressional elections nationwide on November 2, 2004. Republicans held a majority of Indiana's delegation, 6–3, before the elections. The only incumbent to lose re-election was Democrat Baron Hill, who lost to Republican Mike Sodrel in the 9th district.

== Overview ==
United States House of Representatives elections in Indiana, 2004
Party	Votes	Percentage	Seats	+/–
Republican	1,381,699	57.18%	7	+1
Democratic	999,082	41.35%	2	-1
Libertarian	35,470	1.47%	0	-
Totals	2,416,251	100.00%	9	-

== District 1 ==
2004 Indiana's 1st congressional district election
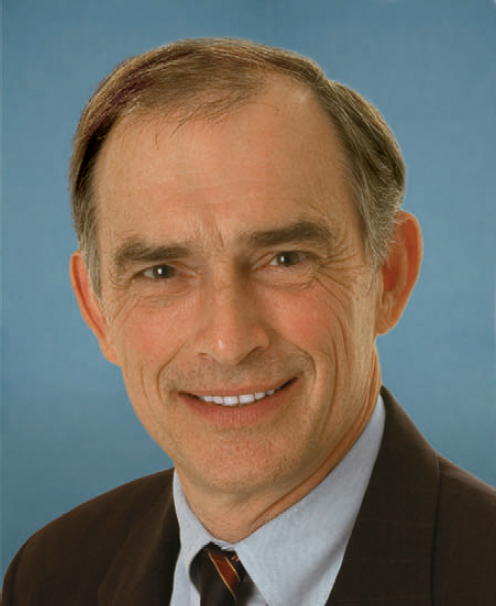

Nominee	Pete Visclosky	Mark Leyva
Party	Democratic	Republican
Popular vote	178,406	82,858
Percentage	68.3%	31.7%
- County results Visclosky: 50–60% 60–70% 70–80% Leyva: 50–60%
U.S. Representative before election
Pete Visclosky
Democratic
Elected U.S. Representative
Pete Visclosky
Democratic

This district includes a small strip of northwest Indiana. The district has been one of the most Democratic in Indiana.

=== Predictions ===
Source	Ranking	As of
The Cook Political Report	Safe D	October 29, 2004
Sabato's Crystal Ball	Safe D	November 1, 2004

=== Results ===
General election
Party	Candidate	Votes	%	±%
Democratic	Pete Visclosky (incumbent)	178,406	68.3%	
Republican	Mark Leyva	82,858	31.7%	
Turnout		261,264	59%	
Democratic hold		Swing		

== District 2 ==
2004 Indiana's 2nd congressional district election
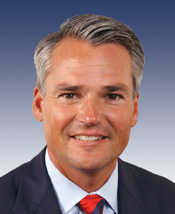

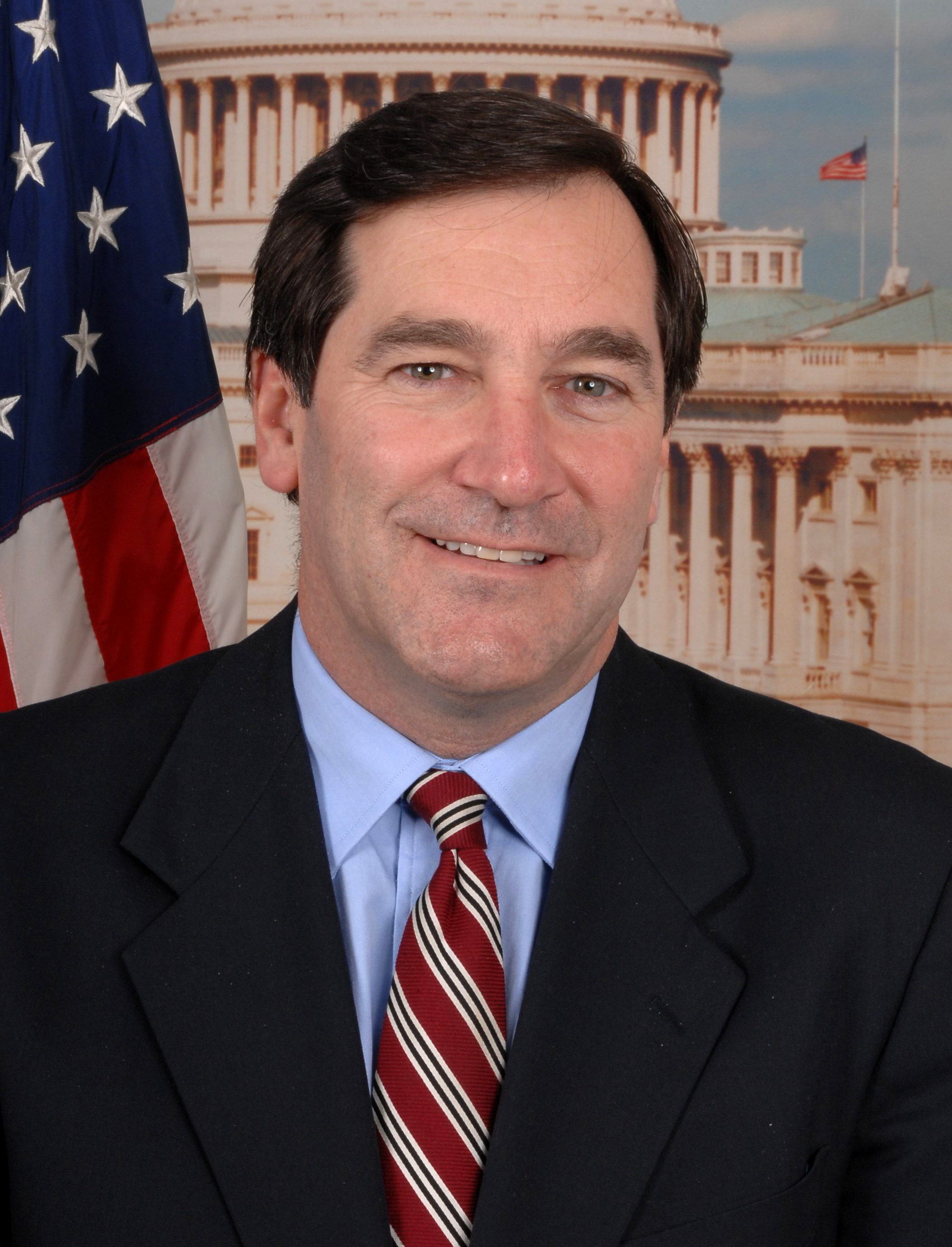
Nominee	Chris Chocola	Joe Donnelly
Party	Republican	Democratic
Popular vote	140,496	115,513
Percentage	54.2%	44.5%
- County results Donnelly: 40–50% 50–60% Chocola: 50–60% 60–70%
U.S. Representative before election
Chris Chocola
Republican
Elected U.S. Representative
Chris Chocola
Republican

This district is centered on South Bend, Indiana and the Indiana portion of the Michiana region.

=== Predictions ===
Source	Ranking	As of
The Cook Political Report	Likely R	October 29, 2004
Sabato's Crystal Ball	Safe R	November 1, 2004

=== Results ===
General election
Party	Candidate	Votes	%	±%
Republican	Chris Chocola (incumbent)	140,496	54.2%	
Democratic	Joe Donnelly	115,513	44.5%	
Libertarian	Douglas Barnes	3,346	1.3%	
Turnout		259,355	62%	
Republican hold		Swing		

== District 3 ==
2004 Indiana's 3rd congressional district election
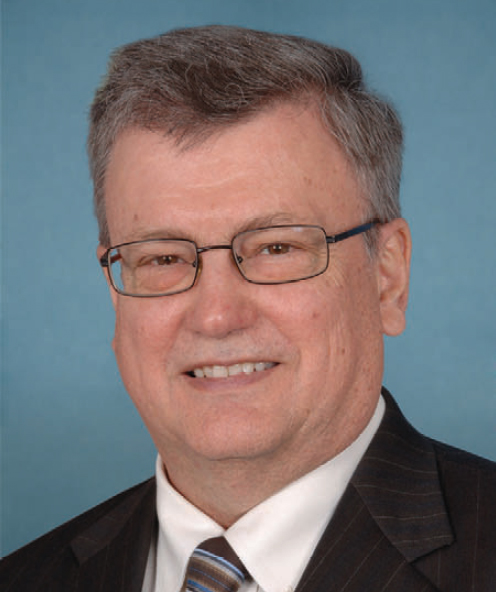

Nominee	Mark Souder	Maria Parra
Party	Republican	Democratic
Popular vote	171,389	76,232
Percentage	69.2%	30.8%
- County results Souder: 60–70% 70–80% 80–90%
U.S. Representative before election
Mark Souder
Republican
Elected U.S. Representative
Mark Souder
Republican

This district is located in the northeast corner of Indiana and has a large population center in Fort Wayne.

=== Predictions ===
Source	Ranking	As of
The Cook Political Report	Safe R	October 29, 2004
Sabato's Crystal Ball	Safe R	November 1, 2004

=== Results ===
General election
Party	Candidate	Votes	%	±%
Republican	Mark Souder (incumbent)	171,389	69.2%	
Democratic	Maria Parra	76,232	30.8%	
Turnout		247,621	59%	
Republican hold		Swing		

== District 4 ==
2004 Indiana's 4th congressional district election
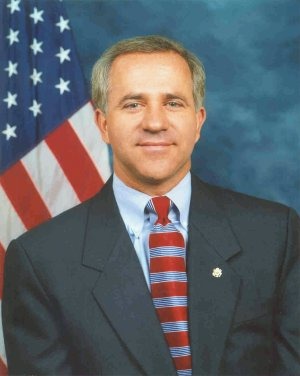

Nominee	Steve Buyer	David Sanders
Party	Republican	Democratic
Popular vote	190,445	77,574
Percentage	69.5%	28.3%
- County results Buyer: 60–70% 70–80%
U.S. Representative before election
Steve Buyer
Republican
Elected U.S. Representative
Steve Buyer
Republican

This district is located in west-central Indiana. Located within the district is the city of West Lafayette and many suburban towns.

=== Predictions ===
Source	Ranking	As of
The Cook Political Report	Safe R	October 29, 2004
Sabato's Crystal Ball	Safe R	November 1, 2004

=== Results ===
General election
Party	Candidate	Votes	%	±%
Republican	Steve Buyer (incumbent)	190,445	69.5%	
Democratic	David Sanders	77,574	28.3%	
Libertarian	Kevin Fleming	6,117	2.2%	
Turnout		274,136	55%	
Republican hold		Swing		

== District 5 ==
2004 Indiana's 5th congressional district election
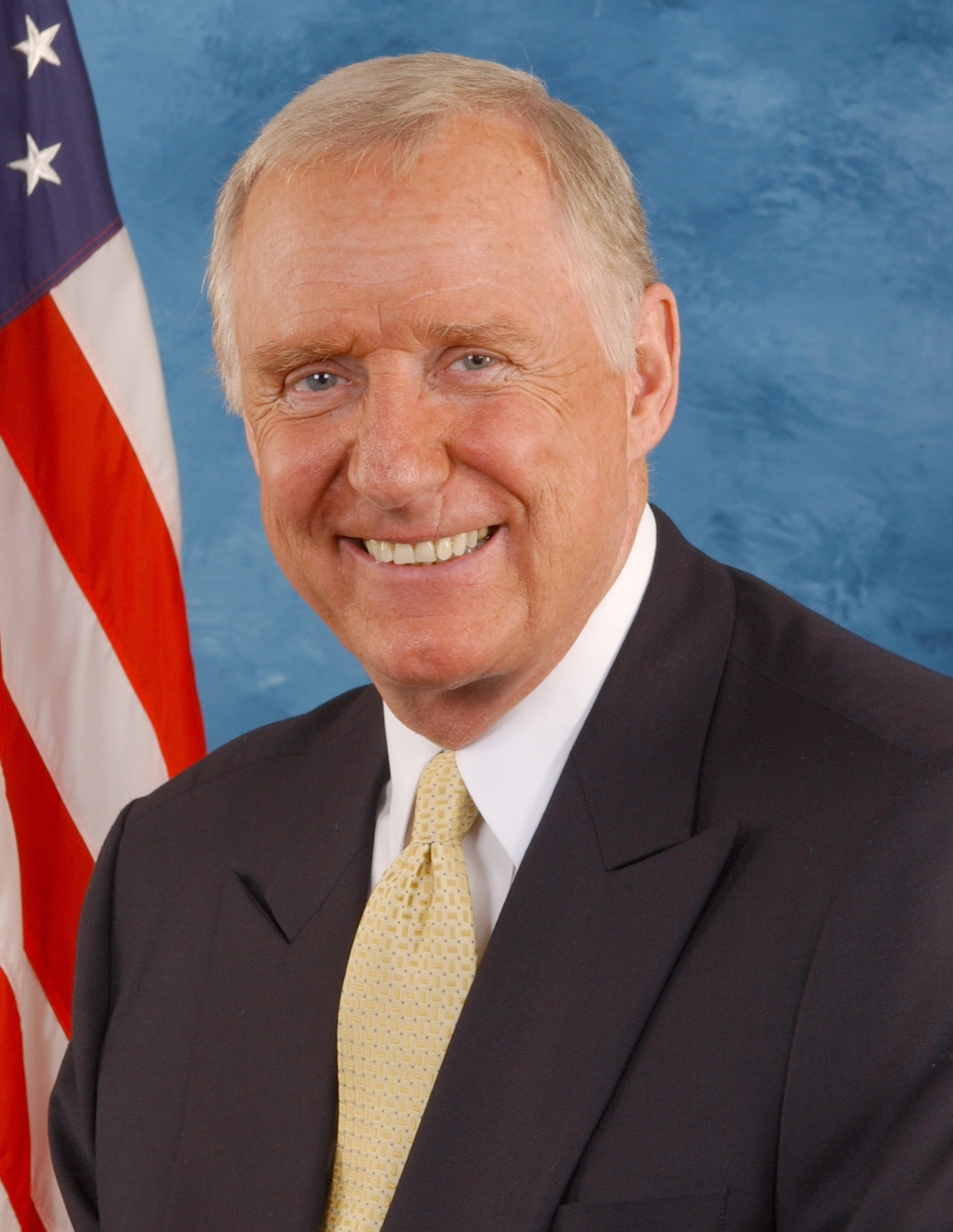

Nominee	Dan Burton	Katherine Carr
Party	Republican	Democratic
Popular vote	228,718	82,637
Percentage	71.8%	26.0%
- County results Burton: 60–70% 70–80%
U.S. Representative before election
Dan Burton
Republican
Elected U.S. Representative
Dan Burton
Republican

This district located mostly north of Indianapolis, including the largest suburbs of Indianapolis in Hamilton County.

=== Predictions ===
Source	Ranking	As of
The Cook Political Report	Safe R	October 29, 2004
Sabato's Crystal Ball	Safe R	November 1, 2004

=== Results ===
General election
Party	Candidate	Votes	%	±%
Republican	Dan Burton (incumbent)	228,718	71.8%	
Democratic	Katherine Carr	82,637	26.0%	
Libertarian	Rick Hodgin	7,008	2.2%	
Turnout		318,363	57%	
Republican hold		Swing		

== District 6 ==
2004 Indiana's 6th congressional district election
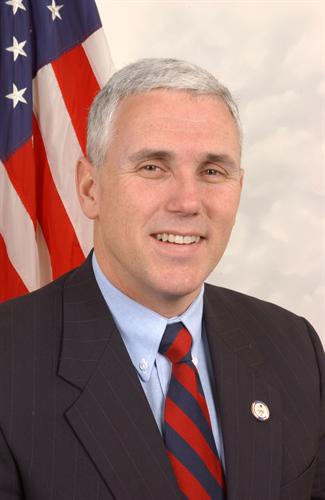

Nominee	Mike Pence	Melina Fox
Party	Republican	Democratic
Popular vote	182,529	85,123
Percentage	67.1%	31.3%
- County results Pence: 50–60% 60–70% 70–80%
U.S. Representative before election
Mike Pence
Republican
Elected U.S. Representative
Mike Pence
Republican

This district takes in a large portion of eastern Indiana, including the cities of Muncie, Anderson, and Richmond.

=== Predictions ===
Source	Ranking	As of
The Cook Political Report	Safe R	October 29, 2004
Sabato's Crystal Ball	Safe R	November 1, 2004

=== Results ===
General election
Party	Candidate	Votes	%	±%
Republican	Mike Pence (incumbent)	182,529	67.1%	
Democratic	Melina Fox	85,123	31.3%	
Libertarian	Chad Roots	4,397	1.6%	
Turnout		272,049	58%	
Republican hold		Swing		

== District 7 ==
2004 Indiana's 7th congressional district election
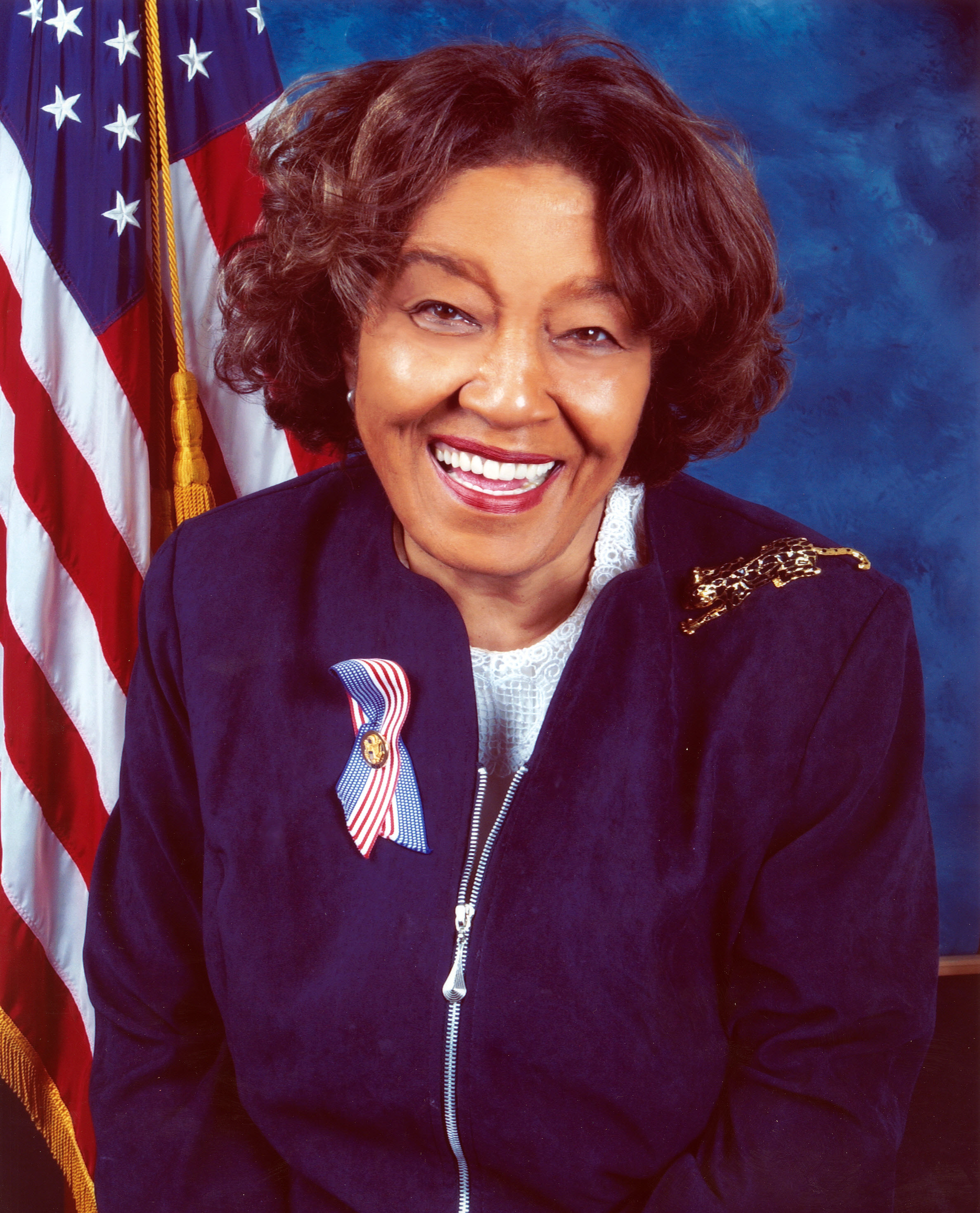

Nominee	Julia Carson	Andy Horning
Party	Democratic	Republican
Popular vote	121,303	97,491
Percentage	54.4%	43.6%
- County results Carson: 50–60%
U.S. Representative before election
Julia Carson
Democratic
Elected U.S. Representative
Julia Carson
Democratic

This district is in the heart of Central Indiana and encompasses most of Marion County/Indianapolis.

=== Predictions ===
Source	Ranking	As of
The Cook Political Report	Safe D	October 29, 2004
Sabato's Crystal Ball	Safe D	November 1, 2004

=== Results ===
General election
Party	Candidate	Votes	%	±%
Democratic	Julia Carson (incumbent)	121,303	54.4%	
Republican	Andy Horning	97,491	43.6%	
Libertarian	Barry Campbell	4,381	2.0%	
Turnout		223,175	53%	
Democratic hold		Swing		

== District 8 ==
2004 Indiana's 8th congressional district election
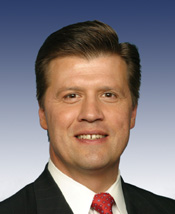

Nominee	John Hostettler	Jon Jennings
Party	Republican	Democratic
Popular vote	145,576	121,522
Percentage	53.4%	44.5%
- County results Hostettler: 40–50% 50–60% 60–70% 70–80% Jennings: 40–50% 50–60%
U.S. Representative before election
John Hostettler
Republican
Elected U.S. Representative
John Hostettler
Republican

Population centers of Evansville and Terre Haute are located within its limits along with numerous other small towns.

=== Predictions ===
Source	Ranking	As of
The Cook Political Report	Lean R	October 29, 2004
Sabato's Crystal Ball	Lean R	November 1, 2004

=== Results ===
General election
Party	Candidate	Votes	%	±%
Republican	John Hostettler (incumbent)	145,576	53.4%	
Democratic	Jon Jennings	121,522	44.5%	
Libertarian	Mark Gavin	5,680	2.1%	
Turnout		272,778	57%	
Republican hold		Swing		

== District 9 ==
2004 Indiana's 9th congressional district election
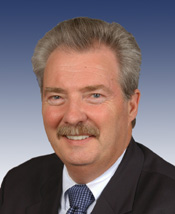

Nominee	Mike Sodrel	Baron Hill
Party	Republican	Democratic
Popular vote	142,197	140,772
Percentage	49.46%	48.96%
- County results Sodrel: 50–60% 60–70% Hill: 40–50% 50–60%
U.S. Representative before election
Baron Hill
Democratic
Elected U.S. Representative
Mike Sodrel
Republican

This district is located in southeast Indiana. The largest city located within the district is Bloomington followed by; Columbus, New Albany, Jeffersonville, and Clarksville. This was the closest House race in 2004.

=== Predictions ===
Source	Ranking	As of
The Cook Political Report	Lean D	October 29, 2004
Sabato's Crystal Ball	Lean D	November 1, 2004

=== Results ===
General election
Party	Candidate	Votes	%	±%
Republican	Mike Sodrel	142,197	49.5%	
Democratic	Baron Hill (incumbent)	140,772	49.0%	
Libertarian	Al Cox	4,541	1.5%	
Turnout		287,510	57%	
Republican gain from Democratic		Swing		

== See also ==
- United States House of Representatives elections, 2004
- United States Senate election in Indiana, 2004
- United States presidential election in Indiana, 2004

Preceded by 2002 elections	United States House elections in Indiana; 2004	Succeeded by 2006 elections
