= 2002 United States House of Representatives elections in Indiana =

Congressional vote in the state of Indiana

- November 5, 2002

All 9 Indiana seats to the United States House of Representatives
	Majority party	Minority party
Party	Republican	Democratic
Last election	6	4
Seats won	6	3
Seat change	Steady	▼1
Popular vote	840,694	640,568
Percentage	55.26%	42.11%
Swing	▲2.38%	▼2.08%

Republican
40–50%
50–60%
60–70%
70–80%
Democratic
40–50%
50–60%
60–70%
70–80%

The 2002 congressional elections in Indiana were elections for Indiana's delegation to the United States House of Representatives, which occurred along with congressional elections nationwide on November 5, 2002. Republicans held a majority of Indiana's delegation, 6–4, before the elections. The districts were redrawn prior to the 2002 elections, reducing the number of districts by 1. Democrat Tim Roemer of the 2nd district retired, leaving the seat vacant. Republicans picked up the 2nd district seat, gaining a 6–3 advantage following the elections.

== Overview ==
The following are the final results from the Secretary of State of Indiana.

United States House of Representatives elections in Indiana, 2002
Party	Votes	Percentage	Seats	+/–
Republican	840,694	55.26%	6	-
Democratic	640,568	42.11%	3	-1
Libertarian	37,270	2.45%	0	-
Green	2,745	0.18%	0	-
Others	76	<0.01%	0	-
Totals	1,521,353	100.00%	9	-

== District 1 ==
2002 Indiana's 1st congressional district election
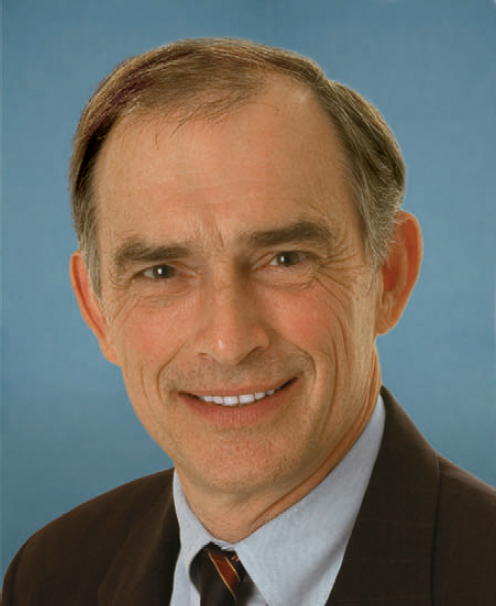

Nominee	Pete Visclosky	Mark Leyva
Party	Democratic	Republican
Popular vote	90,443	41,909
Percentage	67.0%	31.0%
- County results Visclosky: 50–60% 60–70% 70–80% Leyva: 50–60%
U.S. Representative before election
Pete Visclosky
Democratic
Elected U.S. Representative
Pete Visclosky
Democratic

This district includes a small strip of northwest Indiana. The district has been one of the most Democratic in Indiana.

=== Predictions ===
Source	Ranking	As of
Sabato's Crystal Ball	Safe D	November 4, 2002
New York Times	Safe D	October 14, 2002

=== Results ===
General election
Party	Candidate	Votes	%	±%
Democratic	Pete Visclosky (incumbent)	90,443	67.0%	
Republican	Mark Leyva	41,909	31.0%	
Libertarian	Timothy Brennan	2,759	2.0%	
Turnout		135,111	32%	
Democratic hold		Swing		

== District 2 ==
2002 Indiana's 2nd congressional district election
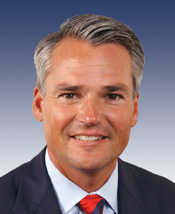

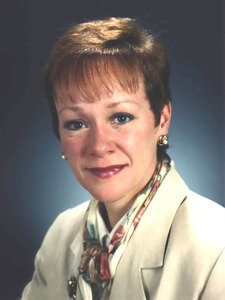
Nominee	Chris Chocola	Jill Long Thompson
Party	Republican	Democratic
Popular vote	95,081	86,253
Percentage	50.4%	45.8%
- County results Chocola: 50–60% 60–70% Thompson: 40–50% 50–60%
U.S. Representative before election
Mike Pence
Republican
Elected U.S. Representative
Chris Chocola
Republican

This district is centered on South Bend, Indiana and the Indiana portion of the Michiana region.

=== Predictions ===
Source	Ranking	As of
Sabato's Crystal Ball	Lean R (flip)	November 4, 2002
New York Times	Tossup	October 14, 2002

=== Results ===
General election
Party	Candidate	Votes	%	±%
Republican	Chris Chocola	95,081	50.4%	
Democratic	Jill Long Thompson	86,253	45.8%	
Libertarian	Sharon Metheny	7,112	3.8%	
No party	Write-Ins	12	0.0%	
Turnout		188,458	45%	
Republican gain from Democratic		Swing		

== District 3 ==
2002 Indiana's 3rd congressional district election
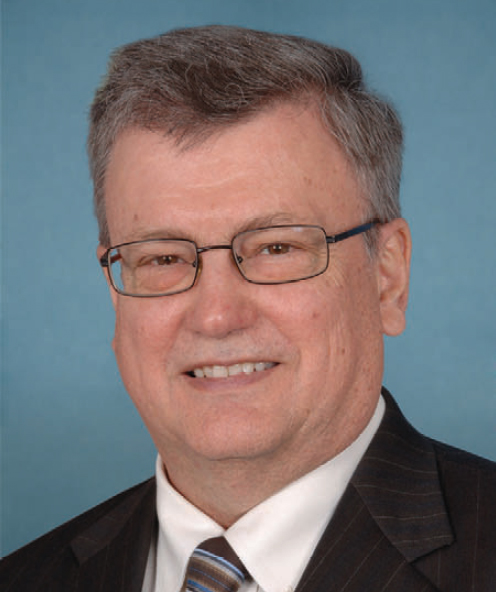

Nominee	Mark Souder	Jay Rigdon
Party	Republican	Democratic
Popular vote	92,566	50,509
Percentage	63.1%	34.5%
- County results Souder: 50–60% 60–70% 70–80%
U.S. Representative before election
Mark Souder
Republican
Elected U.S. Representative
Mark Souder
Republican

This district is located in the northeast corner of Indiana and has a large population center in Fort Wayne.

=== Predictions ===
Source	Ranking	As of
Sabato's Crystal Ball	Safe R	November 4, 2002
New York Times	Safe R	October 14, 2002

=== Results ===
General election
Party	Candidate	Votes	%	±%
Republican	Mark Souder (incumbent)	92,566	63.1%	
Democratic	Jay Rigdon	50,509	34.5%	
Libertarian	Mike Donlan	3,531	2.4%	
Turnout		146,606	37%	
Republican hold		Swing		

== District 4 ==
2002 Indiana's 4th congressional district election
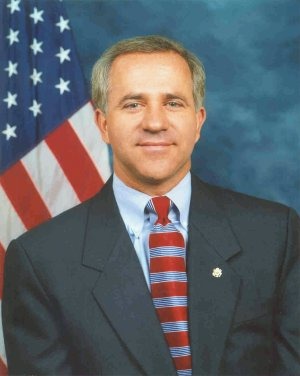

Nominee	Steve Buyer	Bill Abbott
Party	Republican	Democratic
Popular vote	112,760	41,314
Percentage	71.4%	26.1%
- County results Buyer: 60–70% 70–80%
U.S. Representative before election
Steve Buyer
Republican
Elected U.S. Representative
Steve Buyer
Republican

This district is located in west-central Indiana. Located within the district is the city of West Lafayette and many suburban towns.

=== Predictions ===
Source	Ranking	As of
Sabato's Crystal Ball	Safe R	November 4, 2002
New York Times	Safe R	October 14, 2002

=== Results ===
General election
Party	Candidate	Votes	%	±%
Republican	Steve Buyer (incumbent)	112,760	71.4%	
Democratic	Bill Abbott	41,314	26.1%	
Libertarian	Jerry Susong	3,934	2.5%	
Turnout		158,008	36%	
Republican hold		Swing		

== District 5 ==
2002 Indiana's 5th congressional district election
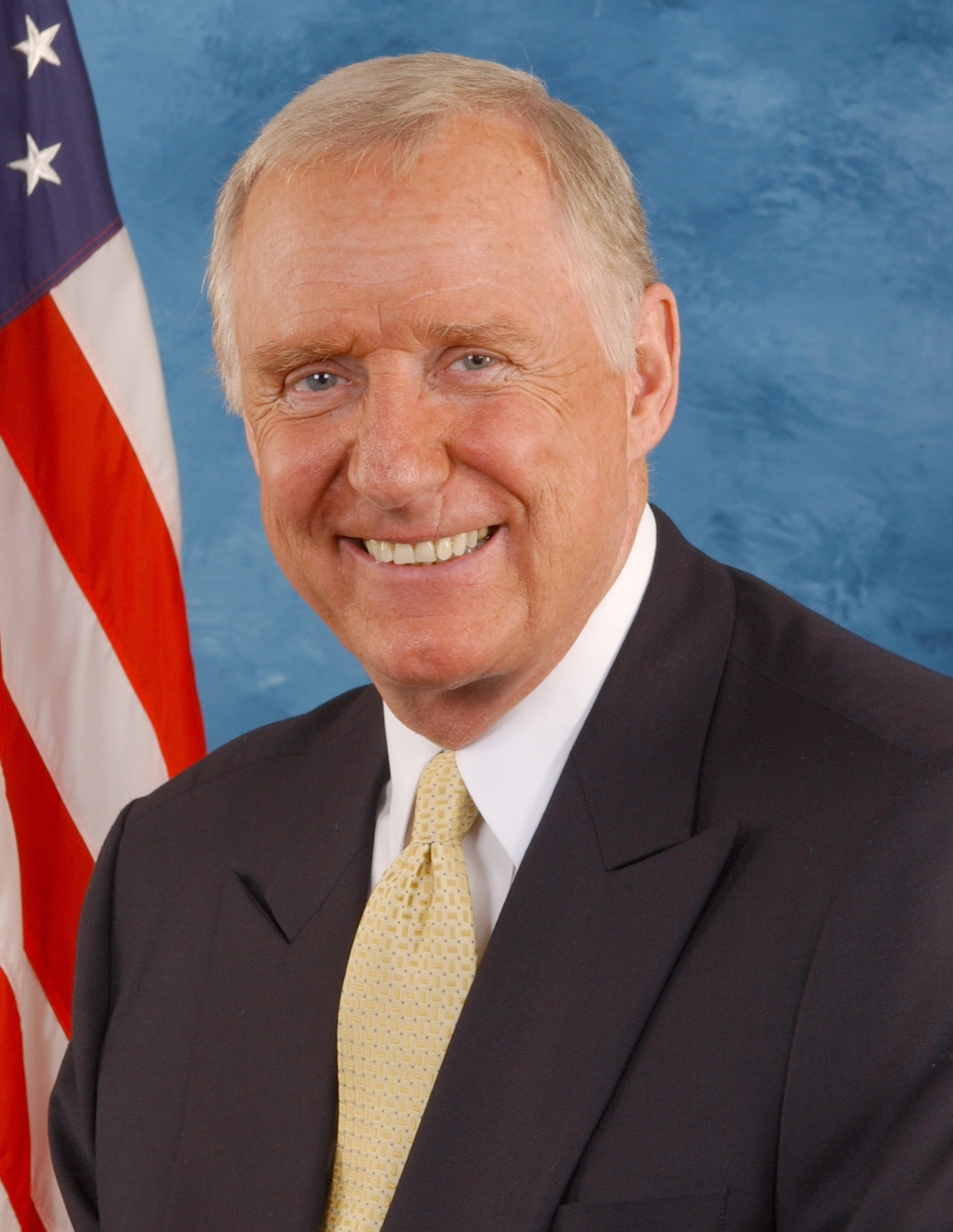

Nominee	Dan Burton	Katherine Carr
Party	Republican	Democratic
Popular vote	129,442	45,283
Percentage	71.9%	25.2%
- County results Burton: 60–70% 70–80%
U.S. Representative before election
Dan Burton
Republican
Elected U.S. Representative
Dan Burton
Republican

This district located mostly north of Indianapolis, including the largest suburbs of Indianapolis in Hamilton County.

=== Predictions ===
Source	Ranking	As of
Sabato's Crystal Ball	Safe R	November 4, 2002
New York Times	Safe R	October 14, 2002

=== Results ===
General election
Party	Candidate	Votes	%	±%
Republican	Dan Burton (incumbent)	129,442	71.9%	
Democratic	Katherine Carr	45,283	25.2%	
Libertarian	Christopher Adkins	5,130	2.9%	
Turnout		179,855	37%	
Republican hold		Swing		

== District 6 ==
2002 Indiana's 6th congressional district election
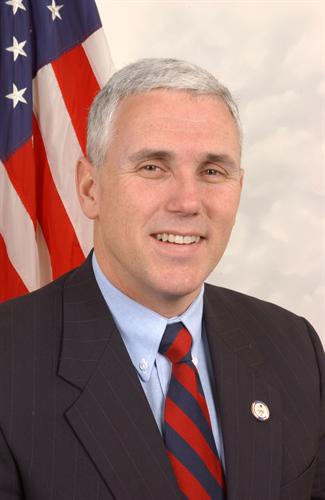

Nominee	Mike Pence	Melina Fox
Party	Republican	Democratic
Popular vote	118,436	63,871
Percentage	63.8%	34.4%
- County results Pence: 50–60% 60–70% 70–80%
U.S. Representative before election
Mike Pence
Republican
Elected U.S. Representative
Mike Pence
Republican

This district takes in a large portion of eastern Indiana, including the cities of Muncie, Anderson, and Richmond.

=== Predictions ===
Source	Ranking	As of
Sabato's Crystal Ball	Safe R	November 4, 2002
New York Times	Safe R	October 14, 2002

=== Results ===
General election
Party	Candidate	Votes	%	±%
Republican	Mike Pence (incumbent)	118,436	63.8%	
Democratic	Melina Fox	63,871	34.4%	
Libertarian	Doris Roberts	3,346	1.8%	
Turnout		185,653	38%	
Republican hold		Swing		

== District 7 ==
2002 Indiana's 7th congressional district election
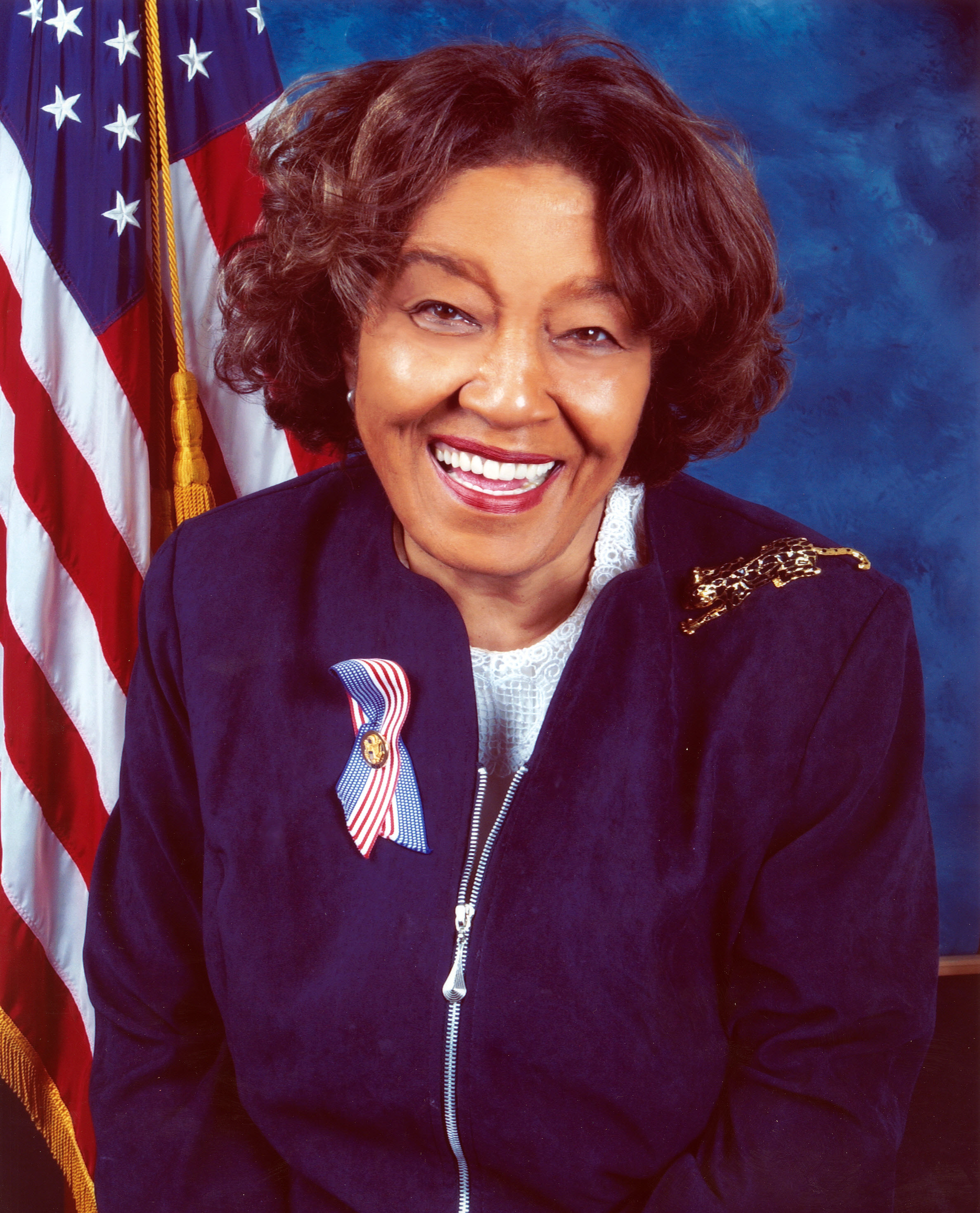

Nominee	Julia Carson	Brose McVey
Party	Democratic	Republican
Popular vote	77,478	64,379
Percentage	53.2%	44.1%
- County results Carson: 50–60%
U.S. Representative before election
Julia Carson
Democratic
Elected U.S. Representative
Julia Carson
Democratic

This district is in the heart of Central Indiana and encompasses most of Marion County/Indianapolis.

=== Predictions ===
Source	Ranking	As of
Sabato's Crystal Ball	Lean D	November 4, 2002
New York Times	Lean D	October 14, 2002

=== Results ===
General election
Party	Candidate	Votes	%	±%
Democratic	Julia Carson (incumbent)	77,478	53.2%	
Republican	Brose McVey	64,379	44.1%	
Libertarian	Andy Horning	3,919	2.7%	
No party	Write-Ins	64	0.0%	
Turnout		145,840	36%	
Democratic hold		Swing		

== District 8 ==
2002 Indiana's 8th congressional district election
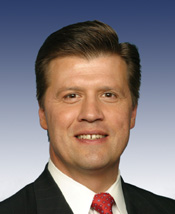

Nominee	John Hostettler	Bryan Hartke
Party	Republican	Democratic
Popular vote	98,952	88,763
Percentage	51.3%	46.0%
- County results Hartke: 40–50% 50–60% Hostettler: 50–60% 60–70%
U.S. Representative before election
John Hostettler
Republican
Elected U.S. Representative
John Hostettler
Republican

Population centers of Evansville and Terre Haute are located within its limits along with numerous other small towns.

=== Predictions ===
Source	Ranking	As of
Sabato's Crystal Ball	Safe R	November 4, 2002
New York Times	Safe R	October 14, 2002

=== Results ===
General election
Party	Candidate	Votes	%	±%
Republican	John Hostettler (incumbent)	98,952	51.3%	
Democratic	Bryan Hartke	88,763	46.0%	
Libertarian	Pam Williams	5,150	2.7%	
Turnout		192,865	43%	
Republican hold		Swing		

== District 9 ==
2002 Indiana's 9th congressional district election
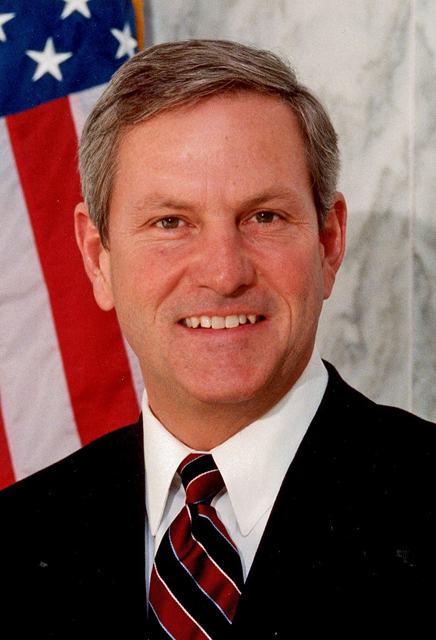

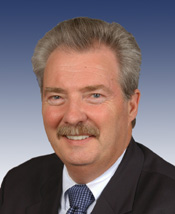
Nominee	Baron Hill	Mike Sodrel
Party	Democratic	Republican
Popular vote	96,654	87,169
Percentage	51.2%	46.0%
- County results Hill: 40–50% 50–60% 60–70% Sodrel: 40–50% 50–60%
U.S. Representative before election
Baron Hill
Democratic
Elected U.S. Representative
Baron Hill
Democratic

This district is located in southeast Indiana. The largest city located within the district is Bloomington followed by Columbus, New Albany, Jeffersonville, and Clarksville.

=== Predictions ===
Source	Ranking	As of
Sabato's Crystal Ball	Safe D	November 4, 2002
New York Times	Safe D	October 14, 2002

=== Results ===
General election
Party	Candidate	Votes	%	±%
Democratic	Baron Hill (incumbent)	96,654	51.2%	
Republican	Mike Sodrel	87,169	46.0%	
Green	Jeff Melton	2,745	1.5%	
Libertarian	Al Cox	2,389	1.3%	
Turnout		188,957	39%	
Democratic hold		Swing		

== See also ==
- 2002 United States House of Representatives elections

Preceded by 2000 elections	United States House elections in Indiana; 2002	Succeeded by 2004 elections
