= 2000 United States House of Representatives elections in Indiana =

- November 7, 2000

All 10 Indiana seats to the United States House of Representatives
	Majority party	Minority party
Party	Republican	Democratic
Last election	6	4
Seats won	6	4
Seat change	Steady	Steady
Popular vote	1,140,554	953,167
Percentage	52.88%	44.19%
Swing	▼1.82%	▲1.46%

Democratic
40–50%
50–60%
60–70%
70–80%
Republican
40–50%
50–60%
60–70%
70–80%

The 2000 United States House of Representatives elections in Indiana were held on November 7, 2000, to elect the ten U.S. representatives from the state of Indiana, one from each of the state's ten congressional districts. The elections coincided with the 2000 U.S. presidential election, as well as other elections to the House of Representatives, elections to the United States Senate and various state and local elections.

The results saw several incumbents retaining their seats, with Representatives David McIntosh and Edward Pease retiring, the former to run for Governor of Indiana. Republicans maintained their majority in Indiana's delegation, holding a 6–4 advantage over the Democrats.

== Overview ==
=== Statewide ===
United States House of Representatives elections in Indiana, 2000
Party	Votes	Percentage	Seats	+/–
Republican	1,140,554	52.88%	6	-
Democratic	953,167	44.19%	4	-
Libertarian	43,658	2.02%	0	-
Others	19,365	0.90%	0	-
Totals	2,156,744	100.00%	10	-

Popular vote
Republican	52.88%
Democratic	44.19%
Others	2.93%

House seats
Republican	60.00%
Democratic	40.00%

=== By district ===
Results of the 2000 United States House of Representatives elections in Indiana by district:

District	Republican		Democratic		Others		Total		Result
District	Votes	%	Votes	%	Votes	%	Votes	%	Result
District 1	56,200	27.05%	148,683	71.55%	2,907	1.40%	207,790	100.0%	Democratic hold
District 2	106,023	50.87%	80,885	38.81%	21,499	10.32%	208,407	100.0%	Republican hold
District 3	98,822	47.44%	107,438	51.57%	2,055	0.99%	208,315	100.0%	Democratic hold
District 4	131,051	62.28%	74,492	35.40%	4,887	2.32%	210,430	100.0%	Republican hold
District 5	132,051	60.86%	81,427	37.53%	3,507	1.61%	216,985	100.0%	Republican hold
District 6	199,207	70.35%	74,881	26.44%	9,087	3.21%	283,175	100.0%	Republican hold
District 7	135,869	64.80%	66,764	31.84%	7,032	3.36%	209,665	100.0%	Republican hold
District 8	116,879	52.65%	100,488	45.27%	4,625	2.08%	221,992	100.0%	Republican hold
District 9	102,219	43.82%	126,420	54.19%	4,644	1.99%	233,283	100.0%	Democratic hold
District 10	62,233	39.71%	91,689	58.51%	2,780	1.78%	156,702	100.0%	Democratic hold
Total	1,140,554	52.88%	953,167	44.19%	63,023	2.93%	2,156,744	100.0%	

== District 1 ==
2000 Indiana's 1st congressional district election
- November 7, 2000
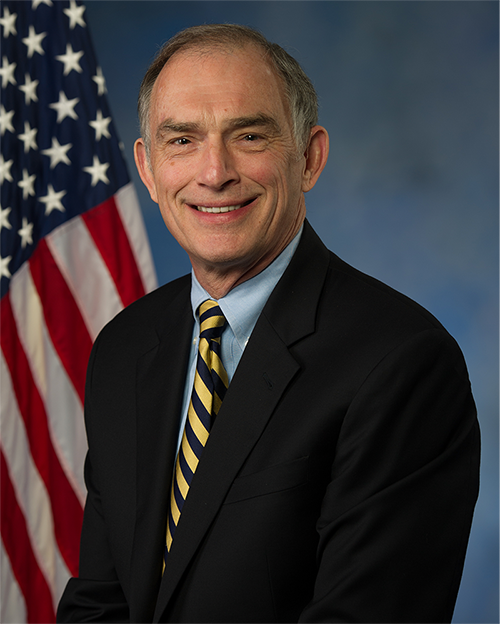

Nominee	Peter J. Visclosky	Jack Reynolds
Party	Democratic	Republican
Popular vote	148,683	56,200
Percentage	71.6%	27.0%
Elected U.S. Representative
Peter J. Visclosky
Democratic

Peter J. Visclosky won the election with 71.6% of the vote.

=== General election ===
==== Results ====
Indiana's 1st congressional district election, 2000
Party	Candidate	Votes	%
Democratic	Peter J. Visclosky	148,683	71.6
Republican	Jack Reynolds	56,200	27.0
Libertarian	Christopher Nelson	2,907	1.4
Total votes		207,790	100.0
Democratic hold			

== District 2 ==
2000 Indiana's 2nd congressional district election
- November 7, 2000

Nominee	Mike Pence	Robert W. Rock
Party	Republican	Democratic
Popular vote	106,023	80,885
Percentage	50.9%	38.8%
Elected U.S. Representative
Mike Pence
Republican

Mike Pence won the election with 50.9% of the vote.

=== General election ===
==== Results ====
Indiana's 2nd congressional district election, 2000
Party	Candidate	Votes	%
Republican	Mike Pence	106,023	50.9
Democratic	Robert W. Rock	80,885	38.8
Independent	William G. Frazier	19,077	9.2
Libertarian	Michael E. Anderson	2,422	1.2
Total votes		208,407	100.0
Republican hold			

== District 3 ==
2000 Indiana's 3rd congressional district election
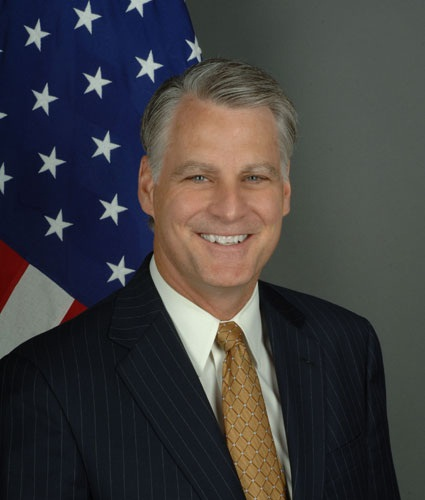

Nominee	Tim Roemer	Chris Chocola
Party	Democratic	Republican
Popular vote	107,438	98,822
Percentage	51.6%	47.4%
U.S. Representative before election
Tim Roemer
Democratic
Elected U.S. Representative
Tim Roemer
Democratic

=== General election ===
==== Polling ====
Poll source	Date(s)	Sample size	Margin of error	Tim Roemer (D)	Chris Chocola (R)	Other / undecided (Note: Calculated by taking the difference of 100% and all other candidates combined.)
Research 2000	October 29, 2000	401	—	48%	41%	11%

Results

Indiana's 3rd congressional district election, 2000
Party	Candidate	Votes	%
Democratic	Tim Roemer	107,438	51.57%
Republican	Chris Chocola	98,822	47.44%
Libertarian	Scott C. Baker	2,050	0.98%
Write-in	Write-ins	5	0.00%
Total votes		208,315	100.00%

== District 4 ==
2000 Indiana's 4th congressional district election
- November 7, 2000
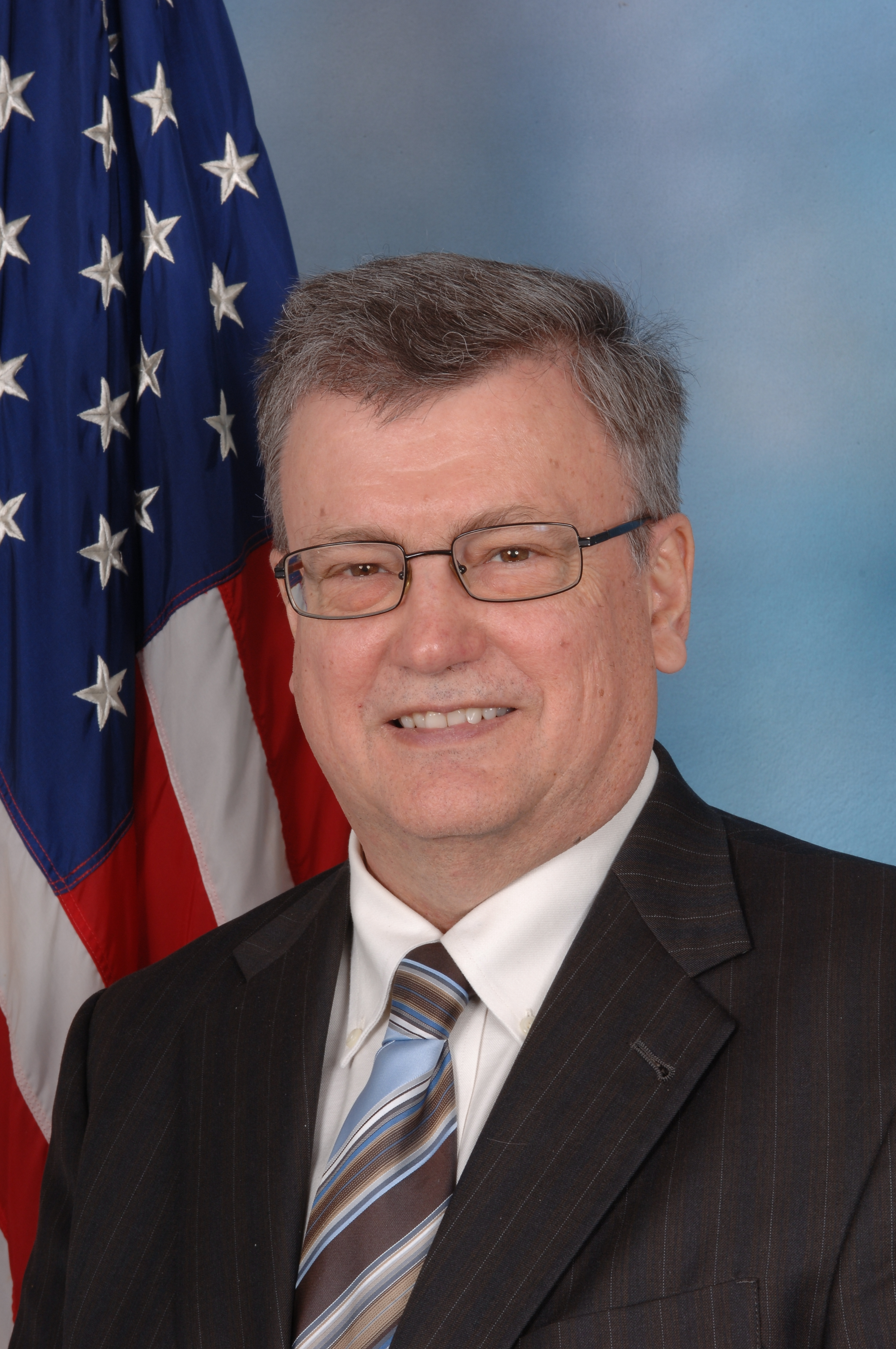

Nominee	Mark E. Souder	Michael Dewayne Foster
Party	Republican	Democratic
Popular vote	131,051	74,492
Percentage	62.3%	35.4%
Elected U.S. Representative
Mark E. Souder
Republican

Mark E. Souder won the election with 62.3% of the vote.

=== General election ===
==== Results ====
Indiana's 4th congressional district election, 2000
Party	Candidate	Votes	%
Republican	Mark E. Souder	131,051	62.3
Democratic	Michael Dewayne Foster	74,492	35.4
Libertarian	Michael Donlan	4,887	2.3
Total votes		210,430	100.0
Republican hold			

== District 5 ==
2000 Indiana's 5th congressional district election
- November 7, 2000
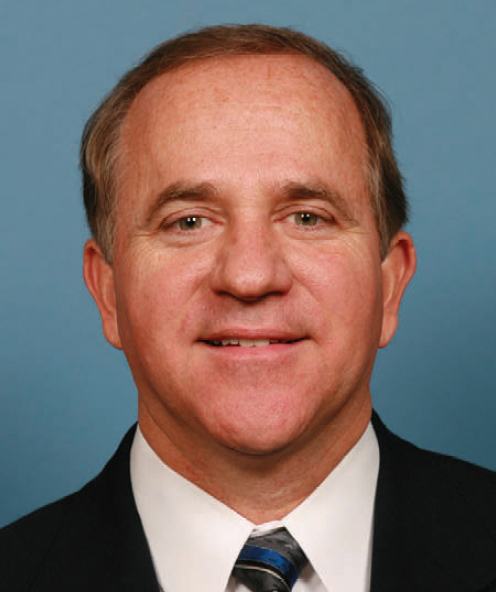

Nominee	Steve Buyer	Greg Goodnight
Party	Republican	Democratic
Popular vote	132,051	81,427
Percentage	60.9%	37.5%
Elected U.S. Representative
Steve Buyer
Republican

Steve Buyer won the election with 60.9% of the vote.

=== General election ===
==== Results ====
Indiana's 5th congressional district election, 2000
Party	Candidate	Votes	%
Republican	Steve Buyer	132,051	60.9
Democratic	Greg Goodnight	81,427	37.5
Libertarian	Scott Benson	3,507	1.6
Total votes		216,985	100.0
Republican hold			

== District 6 ==
2000 Indiana's 6th congressional district election
- November 7, 2000
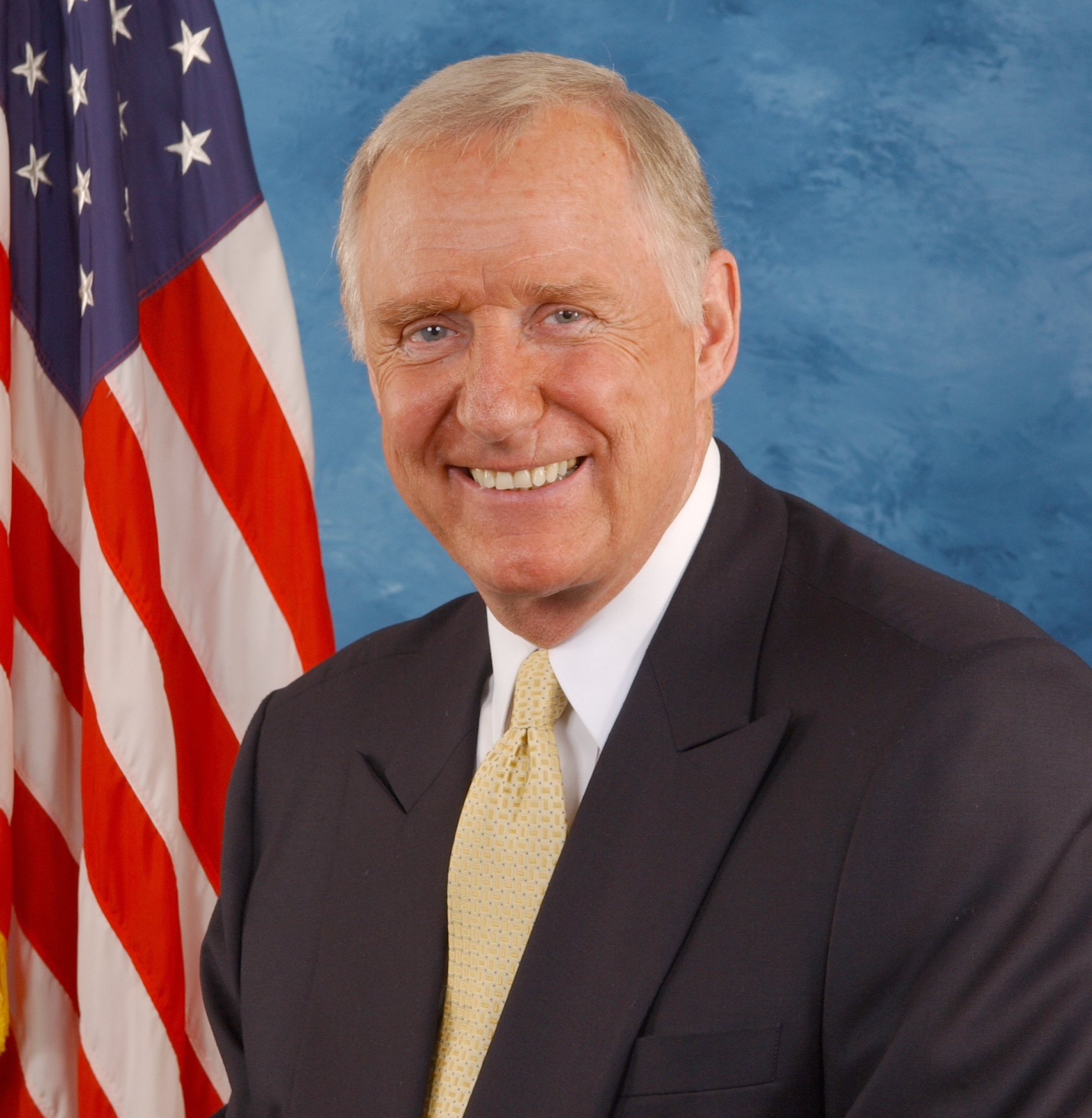

Nominee	Dan Burton	Darin Patrick Griesey
Party	Republican	Democratic
Popular vote	199,207	74,881
Percentage	70.3%	26.4%
Elected U.S. Representative
Dan Burton
Republican

Dan Burton won the election with 70.3% of the vote.

=== General election ===
==== Results ====
Indiana's 6th congressional district election, 2000
Party	Candidate	Votes	%
Republican	Dan Burton	199,207	70.3
Democratic	Darin Patrick Griesey	74,881	26.4
Libertarian	Joe Hauptmann	9,087	3.2
Total votes		283,175	100.0
Republican hold			

== District 7 ==
2000 Indiana's 7th congressional district election
- November 7, 2000
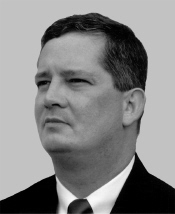

Nominee	Brian D. Kerns	Michael Douglas Graf
Party	Republican	Democratic
Popular vote	135,869	66,764
Percentage	64.8%	31.8%
Elected U.S. Representative
Brian D. Kerns
Republican

Brian D. Kerns won the election with 64.8% of the vote.

=== General election ===
==== Results ====
Indiana's 7th congressional district election, 2000
Party	Candidate	Votes	%
Republican	Brian D. Kerns	135,869	64.8
Democratic	Michael Douglas Graf	66,764	31.8
Libertarian	Bob Thayer	7,032	3.4
Total votes		209,665	100.0
Republican hold			

== District 8 ==
2000 Indiana's 8th congressional district election
- November 7, 2000
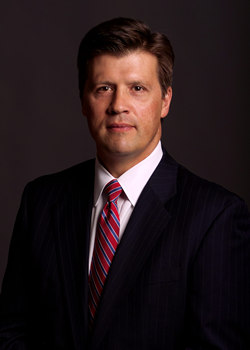

Nominee	John N. Hostettler	Paul E. Perry
Party	Republican	Democratic
Popular vote	116,879	100,488
Percentage	52.7%	45.3%
Elected U.S. Representative
John N. Hostettler
Republican

John N. Hostettler won the election with 52.7% of the vote.

=== General election ===
==== Results ====
Indiana's 8th congressional district election, 2000
Party	Candidate	Votes	%
Republican	John N. Hostettler	116,879	52.7
Democratic	Paul E. Perry	100,488	45.3
Libertarian	Thomas Tindle	4,342	2.0
Write-In	Write-ins	283	0.1
Total votes		221,992	100.0
Republican hold			

== District 9 ==
2000 Indiana's 9th congressional district election
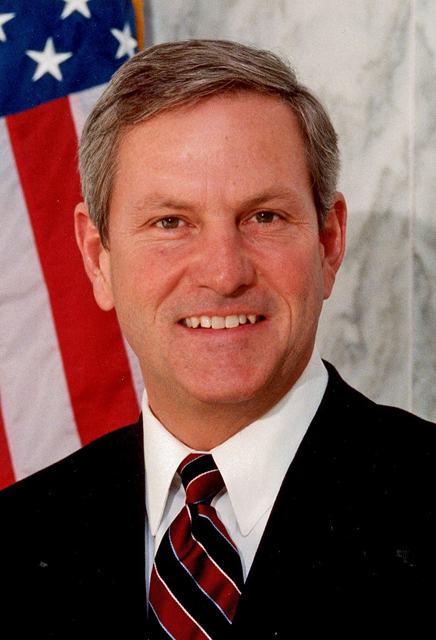

Nominee	Baron P. Hill	Michael E. Bailey
Party	Democratic	Republican
Popular vote	126,420	102,219
Percentage	54.2%	43.8%
U.S. Representative before election
Baron Hill
Democratic
Elected U.S. Representative
Baron P. Hill
Democratic

=== General election ===
==== Polling ====
Poll source	Date(s)	Sample size	Margin of error	Baron Hill (D)	Mike Bailey (R)	Other / undecided (Note: Calculated by taking the difference of 100% and all other candidates combined.)
SurveyUSA	October 23, 2000	500	—	55%	41%	4%

Results

Indiana's 9th congressional district election, 2000
Party	Candidate	Votes	%
Democratic	Baron P. Hill	126,420	54.19%
Republican	Michael E. Bailey	102,219	43.82%
Libertarian	Sara Chambers	4,644	1.99%
Total votes		233,283	100.00%

== District 10 ==
2000 Indiana's 10th congressional district election
- November 7, 2000
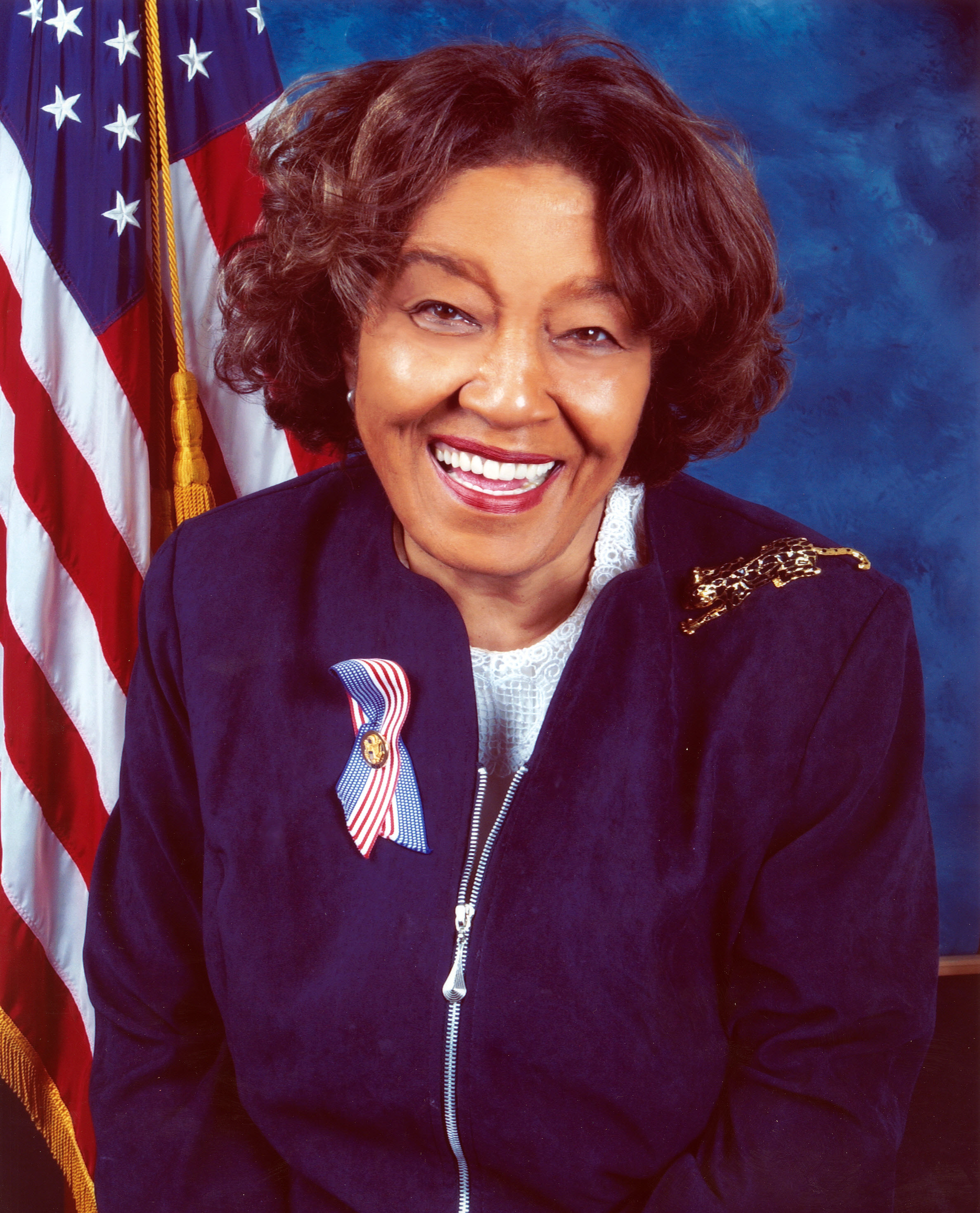

Nominee	Julia Carson	Marvin B. Scott
Party	Democratic	Republican
Popular vote	91,689	62,233
Percentage	58.5%	39.7%
Elected U.S. Representative
Julia Carson
Democratic

Julia Carson won the election with 58.5% of the vote.

=== General election ===
==== Results ====
Indiana's 10th congressional district election, 2000
Party	Candidate	Votes	%
Democratic	Julia Carson	91,689	58.5
Republican	Marvin B. Scott	62,233	39.7
Libertarian	NaIlah Ali	2,780	1.8
Total votes		156,702	100.0
Democratic hold			

== See also ==
- 2000 United States House of Representatives elections

Preceded by 1998 elections	United States House elections in Indiana; 2000	Succeeded by 2002 elections
