= 2006 United States House of Representatives elections in Indiana =

- November 7, 2006

All 9 Indiana seats to the United States House of Representatives
	Majority party	Minority party
Party	Democratic	Republican
Last election	2	7
Seats won	5	4
Seat change	▲3	▼3
Popular vote	812,496	831,785
Percentage	48.74%	49.90%
Swing	▲7.39%	▼7.28%

Democratic
40–50%
50–60%
60–70%
70–80%
Republican
40–50%
50–60%
60–70%
70–80%

The 2006 congressional elections in Indiana were elections for Indiana's delegation to the United States House of Representatives, which occurred along with congressional elections nationwide on November 7, 2006. Indiana played an important role in helping Democrats sweep Congress, when three Republican incumbents were defeated (Chris Chocola, John Hostettler and Mike Sodrel), giving the Democrats a majority of the delegation again. Republicans held a majority of Indiana's delegation, 7–2, before the elections.

Indiana was one of seven states in which the party that won the state's popular vote did not win a majority of seats in 2006, the other states being New Mexico, Nevada, Michigan, Ohio, Iowa, and Wisconsin.

== Overview ==
United States House of Representatives elections in Indiana, 2006
Party	Votes	Percentage	Seats	+/–
Republican	831,785	49.90%	4	-3
Democratic	812,496	48.74%	5	+3
Libertarian	17,324	1.04%	0	-
Independents	5,317	0.32%	0	-
Totals	1,666,922	100.00%	9	-

== District 1 ==
2006 Indiana's 1st congressional district election
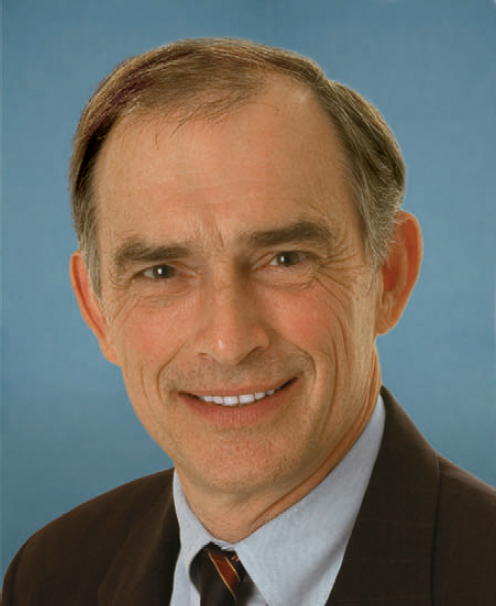

Nominee	Pete Visclosky	Mark Leyva
Party	Democratic	Republican
Popular vote	104,195	40,146
Percentage	69.7%	26.8%
- County results Visclosky: 40–50% 50–60% 60–70% 70–80% Leyva: 50–60%
U.S. Representative before election
Pete Visclosky
Democratic
Elected U.S. Representative
Pete Visclosky
Democratic

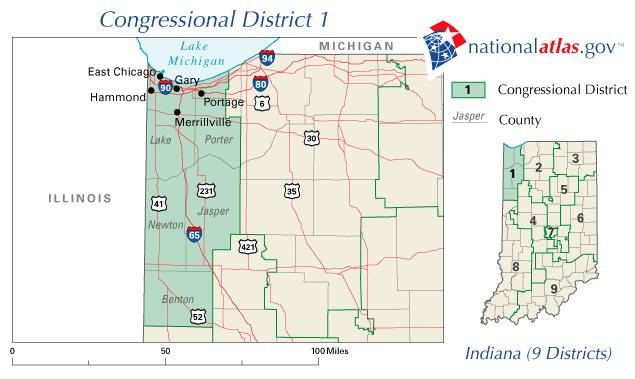

This district is located in Northwest Indiana and borders Chicago. The district has been one of the most Democratic in Indiana.

=== Predictions ===
Source	Ranking	As of
The Cook Political Report	Safe D	November 6, 2006
Rothenberg	Safe D	November 6, 2006
Sabato's Crystal Ball	Safe D	November 6, 2006
Real Clear Politics	Safe D	November 7, 2006
CQ Politics	Safe D	November 7, 2006

2006 Indiana's 1st congressional district election
Party	Candidate	Votes	%
Democratic	Pete Visclosky (incumbent)	104,195	69.65
Republican	Mark Leyva	40,146	26.83
Independent	Charles E. Barman	5,266	3.52
Total votes		149,607	100.00
Democratic hold			

== District 2 ==
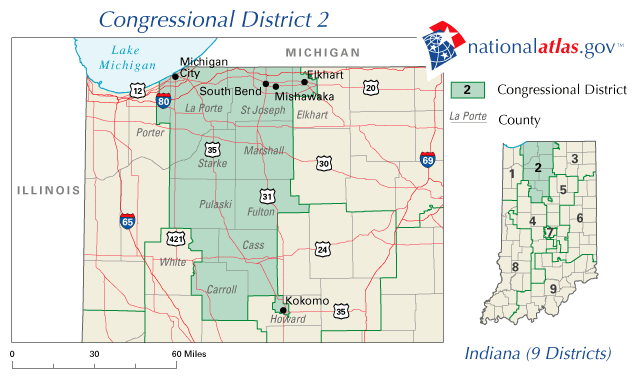

This district is centered on South Bend and the Indiana portion of the Michiana region.

2006 Indiana's 2nd congressional district election
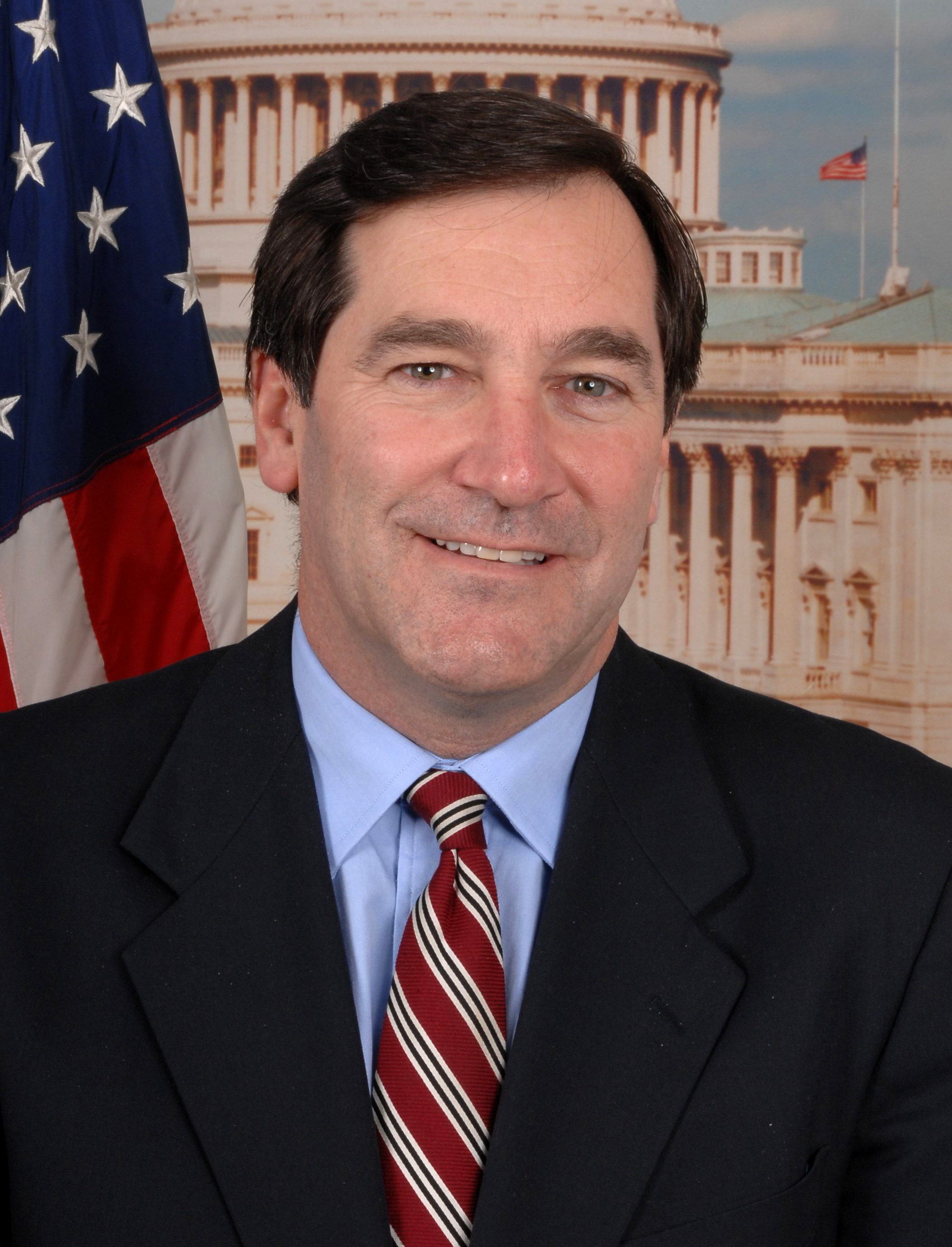

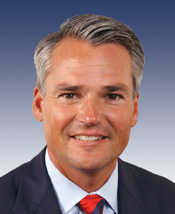
Nominee	Joe Donnelly	Chris Chocola
Party	Democratic	Republican
Popular vote	103,561	88,300
Percentage	54.0%	46.0%
- County results Donnelly: 50–60% 60–70% Chocola: 50–60%
U.S. Representative before election
Chris Chocola
Republican
Elected U.S. Representative
Joe Donnelly
Democratic

Chris Chocola defeated Tony Zirkle, an attorney, Navy veteran, and frequent candidate, in the Republican primary on May 2, 2006, by 70% to 30%. Zirkle, who said he was "willing to debate the idea of returning the guillotine and lynch mob for those who prey on children under the age of 12", was unable to get Chocola to debate him on that or any other subject.

Joe Donnelly raised about $1.5 million to Chocola's $3.2 million. In mid-August, in a report on National Republican Congressional Committee planned spending, the Associated Press reported that "the GOP has not reserved advertising time to aid Rep. Chris Chocola in Indiana even though Democrats plan to spend at least $700,000 to win the district. House Republicans have told Chocola that he must fend for himself, given his personal wealth and his ability to raise large amounts of money."

A poll released in mid-June by the Donnelly campaign showed him leading 48% to 38%, with 14% undecided. The campaign did not release all of the poll findings. A poll released six days later, taken by the South Bend Tribune, showed the race to be at the margin of error with Donnelly at 46% and Chocola at 41%. The telephone poll asked 400 likely voters whom they would vote for "if the election were held now".

On August 16, the Cook Political Report changed the rating for the race from "Lean Republican" to "Toss-Up", saying, "Despite a significant fundraising advantage over Democrat Joe Donnelly, which has helped fuel a barrage of negative attack ads, incumbent GOP Rep. Chris Chocola looks more like an underdog than the frontrunner." Also in August 2006, Larry Sabato's Crystal Ball, a website run by the University of Virginia Center for Politics, added the race to their "Ferocious Forty" list of the 40 most competitive House races in the nation. On November 7, 2006, Chocola lost his congressional seat to Democratic candidate Donnelly, whom Chocola had defeated in 2004. The final tally showed Chocola losing by 15,261 votes, almost an identical reversal of his fortunes in 2004. The election had a much lower turnout than the previous campaign, and the difference appeared to come in St. Joseph County. Historically a Democratic stronghold, Chocola lost it by only a few hundred votes while cruising to victory in 2004. In 2006, however, Donnelly won the county by nearly 14,000 votes, garnering 58% of the vote in what is by far the most populous county of the district.

=== Endorsements ===
Joe Donnelly (D)

Individuals

- Wesley Clark, General, 2004 Democratic presidential candidate

==== Predictions ====
Source	Ranking	As of
The Cook Political Report	Tossup	November 6, 2006
Rothenberg	Lean D (flip)	November 6, 2006
Sabato's Crystal Ball	Lean D (flip)	November 6, 2006
Real Clear Politics	Tossup	November 7, 2006
CQ Politics	Tossup	November 7, 2006

2006 Indiana's 2nd congressional district election
Party	Candidate	Votes	%
Democratic	Joe Donnelly	103,561	53.98
Republican	Chris Chocola (incumbent)	88,300	46.02
Total votes		191,861	100.00
Democratic gain from Republican			

== District 3 ==
2006 Indiana's 3rd congressional district election
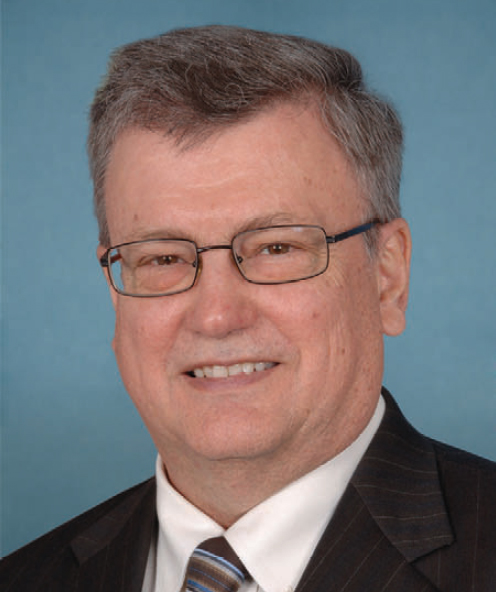

Nominee	Mark Souder	Tom Hayhurst
Party	Republican	Democratic
Popular vote	95,421	80,357
Percentage	54.3%	45.7%
- County results Souder: 50–60% 60–70%
U.S. Representative before election
Mark Souder
Republican
Elected U.S. Representative
Mark Souder
Republican

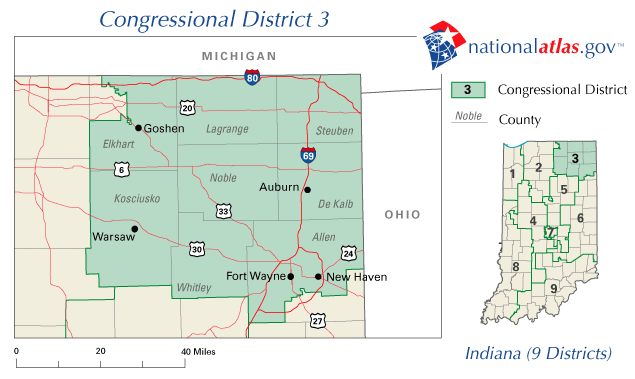

This district is located in the northeast corner of Indiana and has a large population center in Fort Wayne.

=== Predictions ===
Source	Ranking	As of
The Cook Political Report	Likely R	November 6, 2006
Rothenberg	Safe R	November 6, 2006
Sabato's Crystal Ball	Likely R	November 6, 2006
Real Clear Politics	Safe R	November 7, 2006
CQ Politics	Likely R	November 7, 2006

2006 Indiana's 3rd congressional district election
Party	Candidate	Votes	%
Republican	Mark Souder (incumbent)	95,421	54.28
Democratic	Tom Hayhurst	80,357	45.72
Total votes		175,778	100.00
Republican hold			

== District 4 ==
2006 Indiana's 4th congressional district election
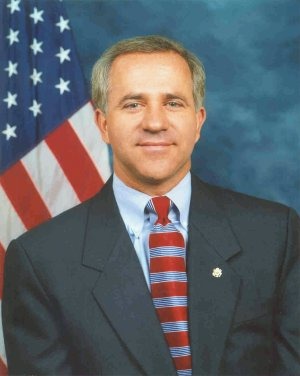

Nominee	Steve Buyer	David Sanders
Party	Republican	Democratic
Popular vote	111,057	66,986
Percentage	62.4%	37.6%
- County results Buyer: 50–60% 60–70% 70–80%
U.S. Representative before election
Steve Buyer
Republican
Elected U.S. Representative
Steve Buyer
Republican

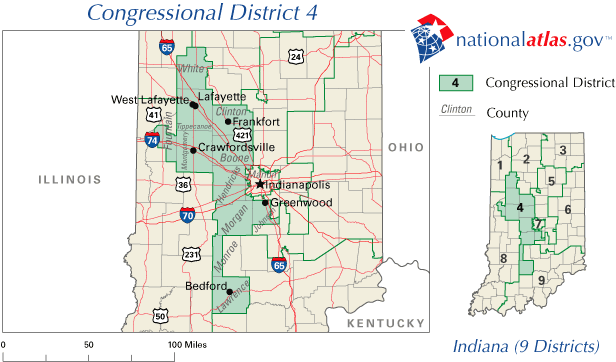

This district is located in west-central Indiana. Located within the district are the city of West Lafayette and the western suburbs of Indianapolis.

=== Predictions ===
Source	Ranking	As of
The Cook Political Report	Safe R	November 6, 2006
Rothenberg	Safe R	November 6, 2006
Sabato's Crystal Ball	Safe R	November 6, 2006
Real Clear Politics	Safe R	November 7, 2006
CQ Politics	Safe R	November 7, 2006

2006 Indiana's 4th congressional district election
Party	Candidate	Votes	%
Republican	Steve Buyer (incumbent)	111,057	62.38
Democratic	David Sanders	66,986	37.62
Total votes		178,043	100.00
Republican hold			

== District 5 ==
2006 Indiana's 5th congressional district election
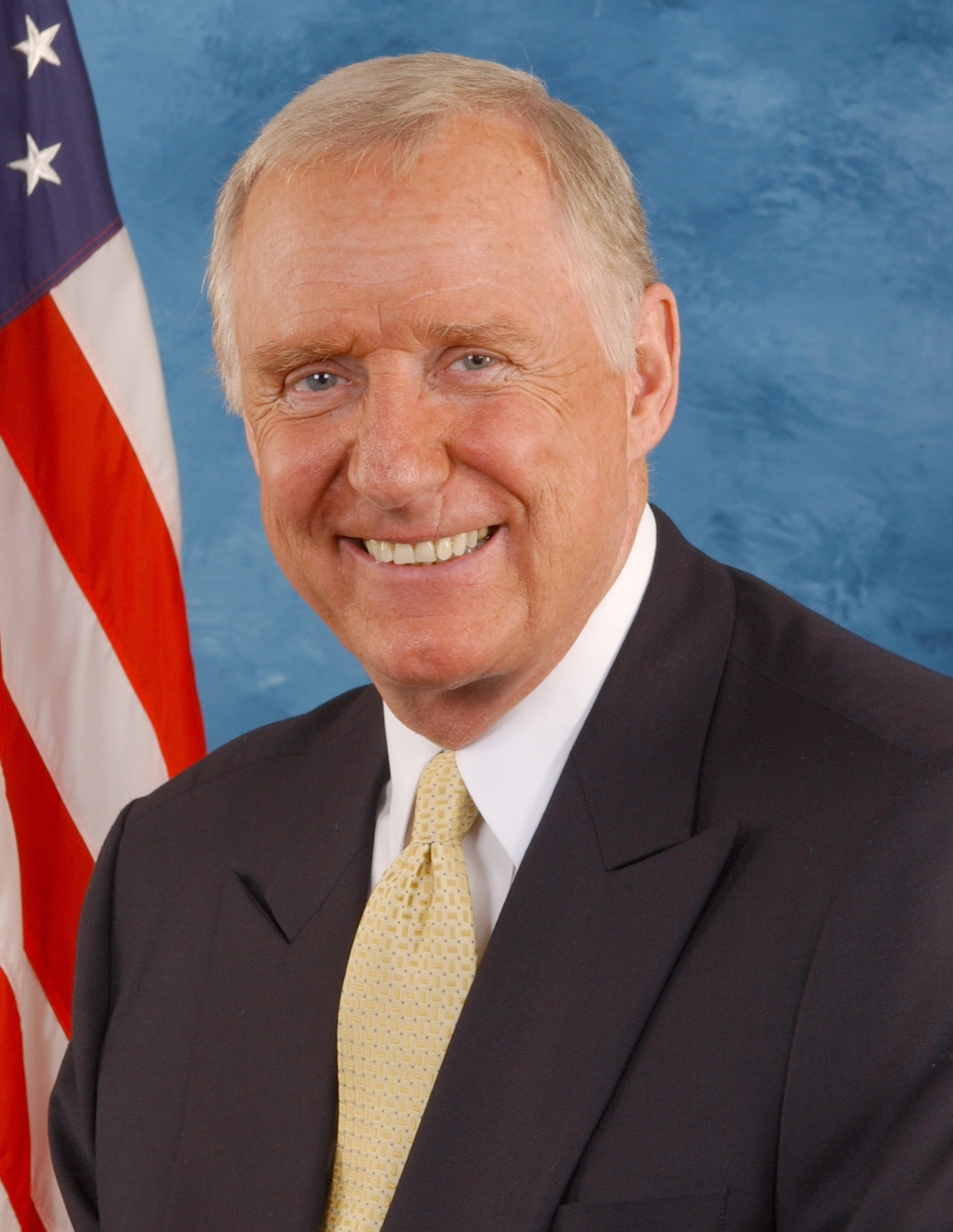

Nominee	Dan Burton	Katherine Fox Carr
Party	Republican	Democratic
Popular vote	133,118	64,362
Percentage	65.0%	31.4%
- County results Burton: 60–70%
U.S. Representative before election
Dan Burton
Republican
Elected U.S. Representative
Dan Burton
Republican

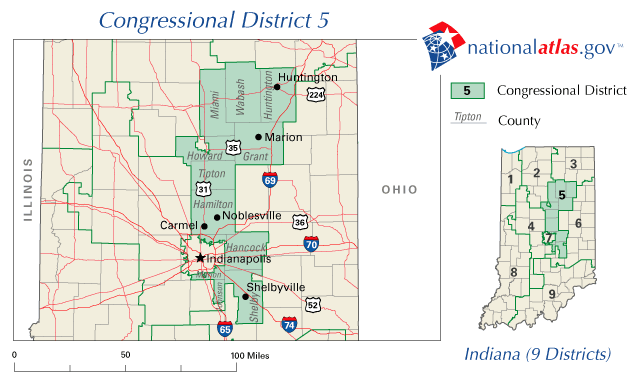

This district located mostly north of Indianapolis, including the largest suburbs of Indianapolis in Hamilton County.

=== Predictions ===
Source	Ranking	As of
The Cook Political Report	Safe R	November 6, 2006
Rothenberg	Safe R	November 6, 2006
Sabato's Crystal Ball	Safe R	November 6, 2006
Real Clear Politics	Safe R	November 7, 2006
CQ Politics	Safe R	November 7, 2006

2006 Indiana's 5th congressional district election
Party	Candidate	Votes	%
Republican	Dan Burton (incumbent)	133,118	64.96
Democratic	Katherine Fox Carr	64,362	31.41
Libertarian	Sheri Conover Sharlow	7,431	3.63
Write-ins		18	0.01
Total votes		204,929	100.00
Republican hold			

== District 6 ==
2006 Indiana's 6th congressional district election
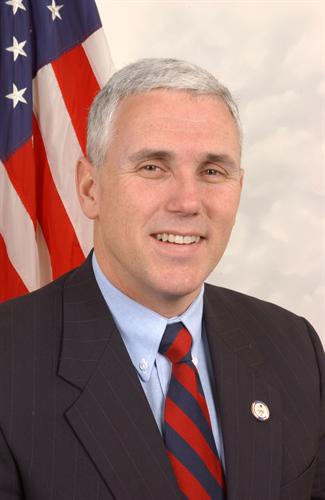

Nominee	Mike Pence	Barry A. Welsh
Party	Republican	Democratic
Popular vote	115,266	76,812
Percentage	60.0%	40.0%
- County results Pence: 50–60% 60–70% 70–80%
U.S. Representative before election
Mike Pence
Republican
Elected U.S. Representative
Mike Pence
Republican

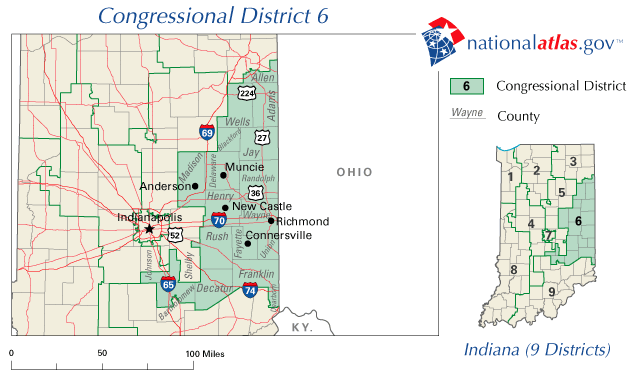

This district takes in a large portion of eastern Indiana, including the cities of Muncie, Anderson, and Richmond.

=== Predictions ===
Source	Ranking	As of
The Cook Political Report	Safe R	November 6, 2006
Rothenberg	Safe R	November 6, 2006
Sabato's Crystal Ball	Safe R	November 6, 2006
Real Clear Politics	Safe R	November 7, 2006
CQ Politics	Safe R	November 7, 2006

2006 Indiana's 6th congressional district election
Party	Candidate	Votes	%
Republican	Mike Pence (incumbent)	115,266	60.01
Democratic	Barry A. Welsh	76,812	39.99
Total votes		192,078	100.00
Republican hold			

== District 7 ==
2006 Indiana's 7th congressional district election
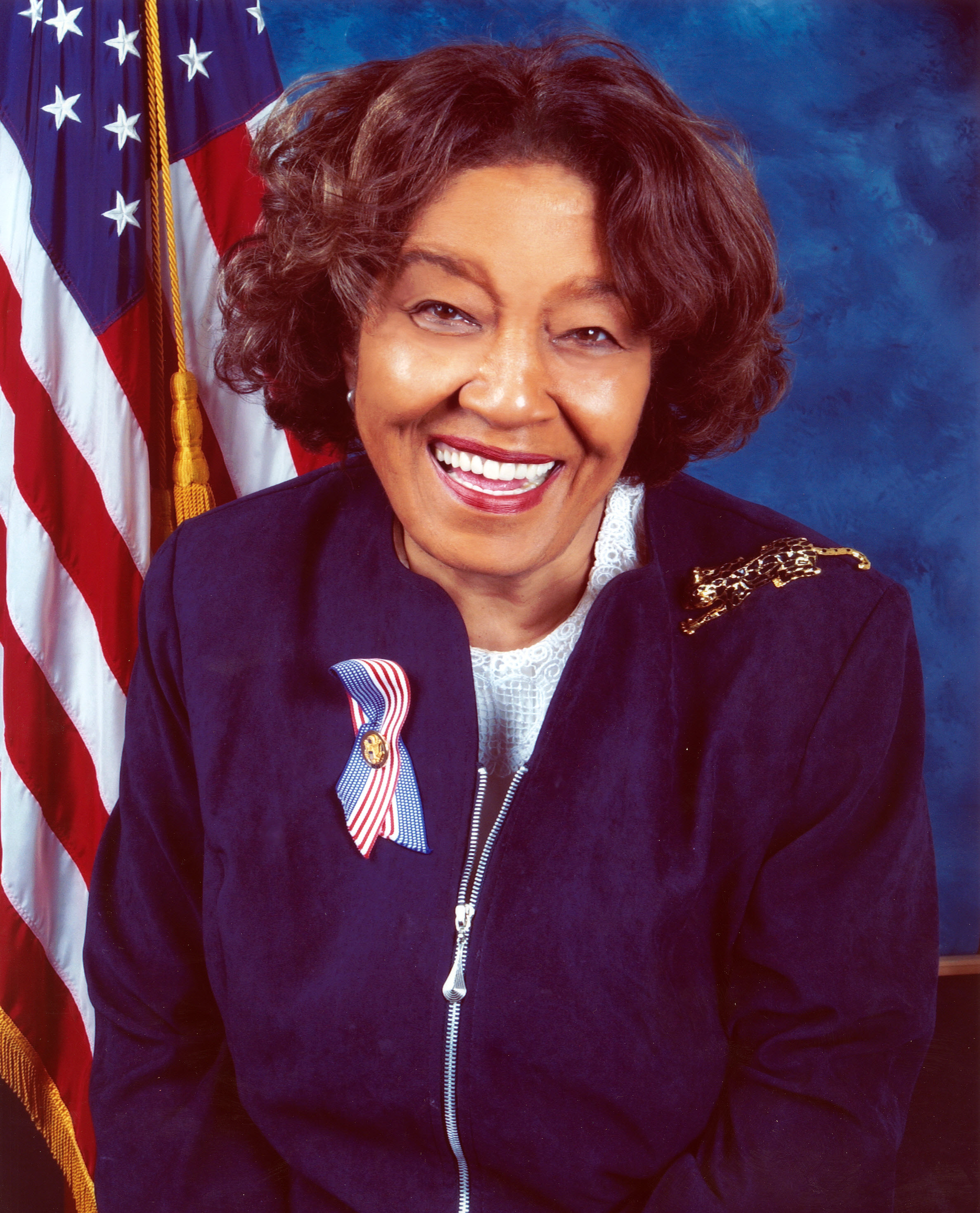

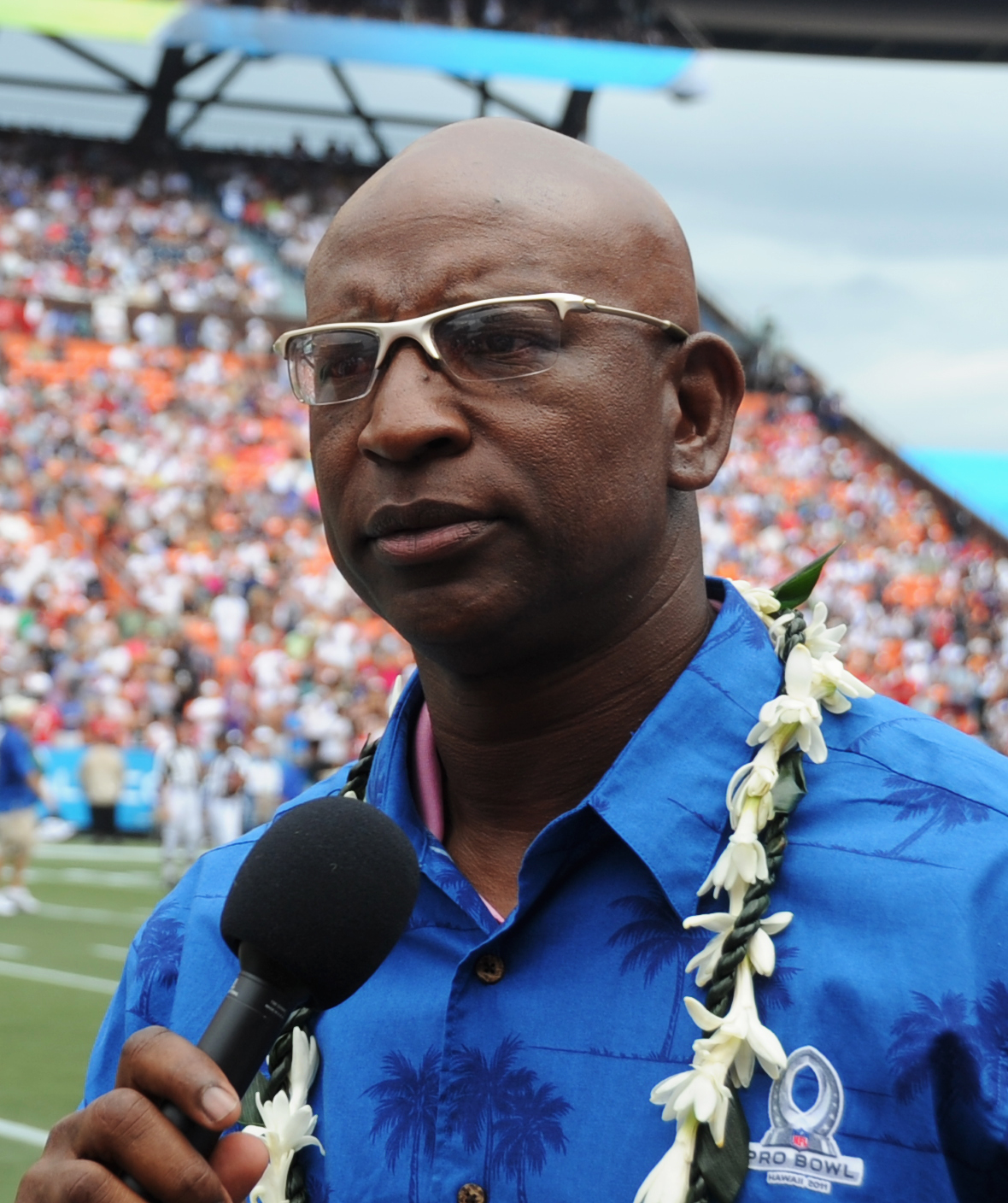
Nominee	Julia Carson	Eric Dickerson
Party	Democratic	Republican
Popular vote	74,750	64,304
Percentage	53.8%	46.2%
- County results Carson: 50–60%
U.S. Representative before election
Julia Carson
Democratic
Elected U.S. Representative
Julia Carson
Democratic

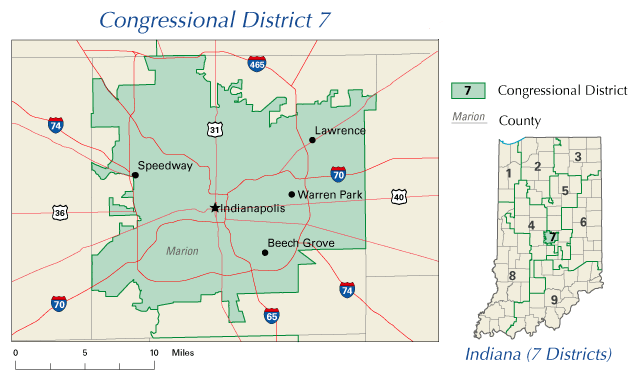
District 7, roughly encompassing Indianapolis and Marion County

This election pitted five-term incumbent Democrat Julia Carson against Republican Eric Dickerson.

Automobile dealer Eric Dickerson is a native of Detroit, Michigan and a graduate of Western Michigan University where he received his B.S. in engineering. Dickerson is a former U.S. Marine Corps officer and served with the HMA 269 Attack Squadron in Jacksonville, North Carolina. He later served in the Indiana National Guard.

Julia Carson had held this Congressional seat based in urban Indianapolis since 1997, and had always won by comfortable margins. Republicans hoped to take the seat in the 2006 elections after redistricting made the 7th slightly more Republican, though Democrats still held the advantage.

Dickerson ran an aggressive grass-roots campaign, defeating the party-endorsed candidate, Ronald Franklin, and two other candidates in the Republican primary on May 2, 2006. He gained further support as the campaign progressed, with an October poll shocking observers of both parties when it showed Dickerson narrowly leading Carson 45% to 42%. Carson dismissed the poll, saying that she always polled more strongly than expected on election day. She was proven correct, winning her sixth term on November 7, 2006.

Republican primary
Eric Dickerson	54%
Ronald Franklin	22%
John Bauer	18%
Michael Simpson	6%

Democratic primary
Julia Carson	81.2%
Kris Kiser	11%
Bob Hidalgo	4.6%
Joseph 'Hippie Joe' Stockett	2.0%
Pierre Quincy Pullins	0.8%

This district is in the heart of Central Indiana and encompasses most of Marion County/Indianapolis.

=== Predictions ===
Source	Ranking	As of
The Cook Political Report	Likely D	November 6, 2006
Rothenberg	Safe D	November 6, 2006
Sabato's Crystal Ball	Safe D	November 6, 2006
Real Clear Politics	Safe D	November 7, 2006
CQ Politics	Likely D	November 7, 2006

2006 Indiana's 7th congressional district election
Party	Candidate	Votes	%
Democratic	Julia Carson (incumbent)	74,750	53.76
Republican	Eric Dickerson	64,304	46.24
Total votes		139,054	100.00
Democratic hold			

== District 8 ==
2006 Indiana's 8th congressional district election
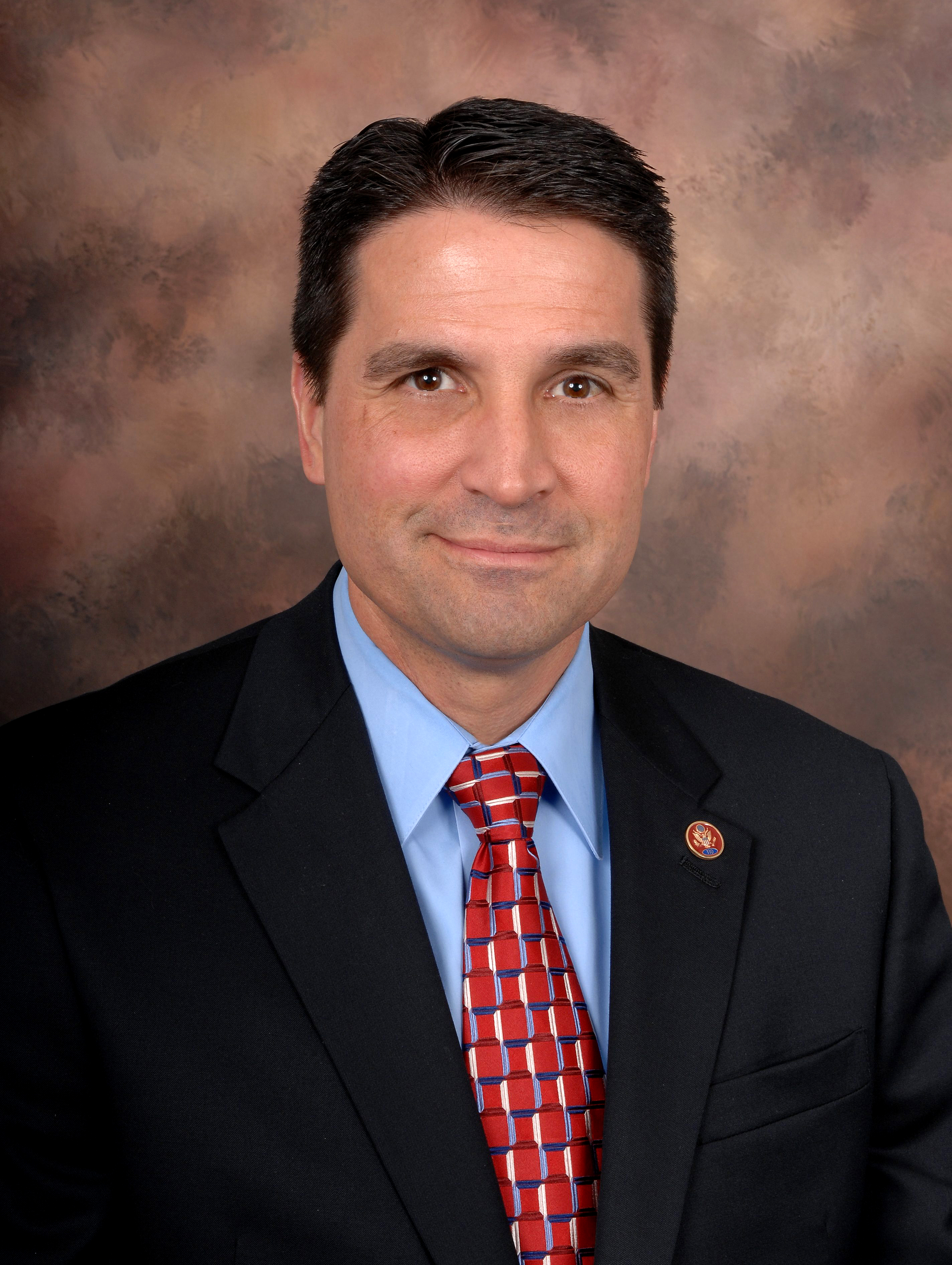

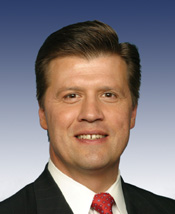
Nominee	Brad Ellsworth	John Hostettler
Party	Democratic	Republican
Popular vote	131,019	83,704
Percentage	61.0%	39.0%
- County results Ellsworth: 50–60% 60–70% 70–80% Hostettler: 50–60%
U.S. Representative before election
John Hostettler
Republican
Elected U.S. Representative
Brad Ellsworth
Democratic

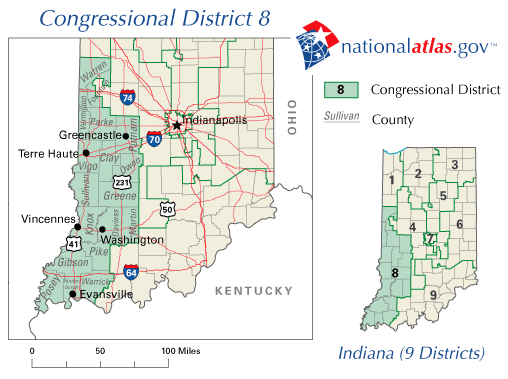

Population centers of Evansville and Terre Haute are located within its limits along with numerous other small towns.

=== Predictions ===
Source	Ranking	As of
The Cook Political Report	Tossup	November 6, 2006
Rothenberg	Likely D (flip)	November 6, 2006
Sabato's Crystal Ball	Likely D (flip)	November 6, 2006
Real Clear Politics	Lean D (flip)	November 7, 2006
CQ Politics	Lean D (flip)	November 7, 2006

2006 Indiana's 8th congressional district election
Party	Candidate	Votes	%
Democratic	Brad Ellsworth	131,019	61.02
Republican	John Hostettler (incumbent)	83,704	38.98
Total votes		214,723	100.00
Democratic gain from Republican			

== District 9 ==
2006 Indiana's 9th congressional district election

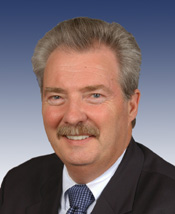
Nominee	Baron Hill	Mike Sodrel
Party	Democratic	Republican
Popular vote	110,454	100,469
Percentage	50.0%	45.5%
- County results Hill: 40–50% 50–60% 60–70% Sodrel: 40–50% 50–60%
U.S. Representative before election
Mike Sodrel
Republican
Elected U.S. Representative
Baron Hill
Democratic

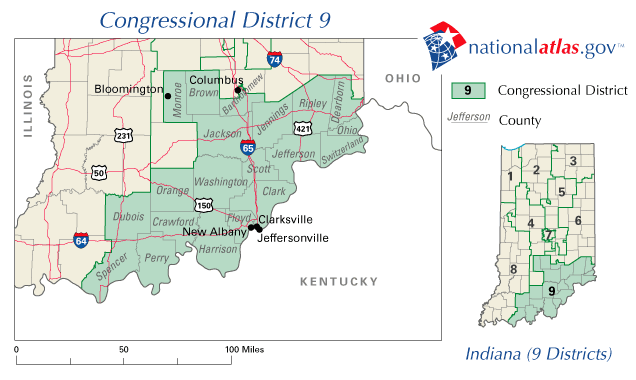

This district is located in southeast Indiana. Suburbs of Cincinnati and Louisville are located within the district. The largest city is Bloomington, followed by Columbus, New Albany, Jeffersonville, and Clarksville.

=== Predictions ===
Source	Ranking	As of
The Cook Political Report	Tossup	November 6, 2006
Rothenberg	Tilt D (flip)	November 6, 2006
Sabato's Crystal Ball	Tilt D (flip)	November 6, 2006
Real Clear Politics	Tossup	November 7, 2006
CQ Politics	Tossup	November 7, 2006

2006 Indiana's 9th congressional district election
Party	Candidate	Votes	%
Democratic	Baron Hill	110,454	50.01
Republican	Mike Sodrel (incumbent)	100,469	45.49
Libertarian	D. Eric Schansberg	9,893	4.48
Write-in		33	0.01
Total votes		220,849	100.00
Democratic gain from Republican			

== See also ==
- 2006 United States House of Representatives elections
- 2006 United States Senate election in Indiana

Preceded by 2004 elections	United States House elections in Indiana; 2006	Succeeded by 2008 elections
