= Jon Jennings =

American politician & basketball coach (b.1962)

City Manager of Clearwater, Florida
- In office November 8, 2021 – January 5, 2023
- Preceded by: Bill Horne
- Succeeded by: Jennifer Poirrier (Temporary)

City Manager of Portland, Maine
- In office July 13, 2015 – November 1, 2021
- Preceded by: Mark Rees
- Succeeded by: Danielle West

Acting United States Assistant Attorney General for the Office of Legislative Affairs
- In office 1998–1999
- Preceded by: L. Anthony Sutin
- Succeeded by: Robert Raben

Personal details
- Born: October 2, 1962
- Party: Democratic
- Occupation: City manager and sports businessperson

Jon Paul Jennings (born October 2, 1962) is an American city manager, politician, and basketball coach. He formerly served as city manager of Portland, Maine, and Clearwater, Florida. He was also the founder, president, and general manager of the Maine Red Claws of the NBA Development League.

== Basketball career ==
Jennings attended Indiana University Bloomington and was a student manager for the Indiana Hoosiers basketball team. While still in school, he was hired by the Indiana Pacers as a scout and video coordinator. He joined the Boston Celtics organization in 1986 where he worked as a scout (1986–1990), assistant coach (1990–1994), and Director of Basketball Development (1994–1997).

== Early political career ==
From 1997 to 2000, Jennings worked in the White House Office as a senior assistant in the Office of Cabinet Affairs, director of policy coordination, liaison to the president's initiative on race, and acting assistant attorney general in charge of legislative affairs. Jennings was selected as a White House Fellow in 1997.

In May 2000, Jennings was named Vice President of Business Development for Givenation.com, a non-profit organization run by former Democratic National Committee Chairman Steve Grossman. He later rejoined the Celtics organization as a scout.

Jennings completed his degree work on a Masters in Public Administration from Harvard.

In 2004, Jennings ran for Indiana's 8th congressional seat as a conservative Democrat opposed to abortion rights and gun control. He defeated Bill Pearman in the Democratic primary but lost to incumbent John Hostettler in the general election.

From 2005 to 2007, Jennings was in charge of the Massachusetts offices of Senator John Kerry.

== Maine Red Claws ==
In February 2009, Maine Basketball, LLC, a group Jennings was a partner of, was granted an NBADL expansion franchise. Jennings was named the team's first president and general manager. In 2010, Jennings was named as the first NBA D-League Executive of the Year. He also became a partner in the Red Mango Frozen Yogurt store at the Maine Mall and a development at Thompson's Point, a project for which he requested and received a $31 million, 30-year tax break from the City of Portland.

== City manager ==
=== Portland ===
From 2013 to 2015, he served as the Assistant City Manager for the City of South Portland, Maine. At the time of his hiring, Dan Boxer, an adjunct professor at the University of Maine School of Law, raised questions about a potential conflict of interest between Jennings's role as a partner in the Thompson's Point project, located in Portland, and his responsibilities as South Portland City Manager, which included attracting businesses that could potentially compete with his Thompson's Point project.

From 2015 to 2021, he served as the City Manager for the City of Portland, Maine. As Portland City Manager, was described by the Portland Press Herald newspaper as "public enemy No. 1 for progressives," as Jennings pushed for the closure of the India Street Health Clinic, ending general assistance for asylum-seekers, limiting access to the city's homeless shelters, against a $64 million municipal bond to renovate elementary schools, and against the city's passage of the nation's toughest pesticide ban mandating organic lawn management which when passed over his objections he underfunded. In 2015, Jennings blocked implementation of a plan that was approved unanimously by the City Council to redesign Franklin Street following a long community process. The plan was revived in 2023, two years after he resigned.

Jennings had long-running feud with elected Portland Mayor Ethan Strimling and faced sharp criticism from local Black Lives Matter activists, who in 2020 called for him to be fired. Elected members of the city council defended Jennings against the criticisms from Black Lives Matter. However, Portland voters in 2021 voted to create a charter commission to consider various changes to the city's form of government, including eliminating the office of city manager and replacing it with an elected, executive mayor.

Jennings resigned as city manager in 2021, before his contract expired, pointing to ongoing criticism from anti-racism activists as his reason for leaving.

=== Clearwater ===
On September 2, 2021, the Clearwater city council voted to hire Jennings as its next city manager. In December 2021, Jennings met with Church of Scientology leader David Miscavige, who has stirred controversy by purchasing extensive real estate in downtown, much of which sits vacant. In 2022, Jennings was accused of helping the Church of Scientology cancel a planned 81-unit affordable housing project in order that the church could open a museum to its founder on the site instead. On January 5, 2023, the Clearwater city council voted in the second of two required votes to terminate the contract of Jennings as City Manager with immediate effect, citing long term and growing concerns over Jennings lack of communication with them, focusing on late and incomplete delivery of information needed for important votes and being kept in the dark in matters involving the Imagine Clearwater project and discussions with Church of Scientology leader David Miscavige.

== Electoral history ==
Indiana's 8th congressional district 2004 Democratic Primary
Party	Candidate	Votes	%	±%
Democratic	Jon Jennings	37,853	73.50%	
Democratic	Bill Pearman	13,645	26.50%	

Indiana's 8th congressional district 2004 General Election
Party	Candidate	Votes	%	±%
Republican	John Hostettler	145,576	53.37%	
Democratic	Jon Jennings	121,522	46%	
Libertarian	Mark Garvin	5,680	2.08%	
