= John Hostettler =

American politician (born 1961)

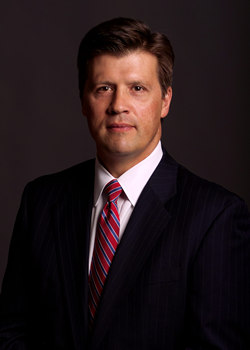

Member of the U.S. House of Representatives from Indiana's 8th district
- In office January 3, 1995 – January 3, 2007
- Preceded by: Frank McCloskey
- Succeeded by: Brad Ellsworth

Personal details
- Born: John Nathan Hostettler; July 19, 1961 (age 65) Evansville, Indiana, U.S.
- Party: Republican
- Spouse: Elizabeth Hostettler
- Children: 4, including Matt
- Education: Rose–Hulman Institute of Technology (BS)

John Nathan Hostettler (born July 19, 1961) is an American politician who served in the United States House of Representatives for 12 years, representing Indiana's 8th congressional district as a Republican. He lost his reelection bid for a seventh term to Democratic challenger Brad Ellsworth in the 2006 midterm election by a landslide.

In 2010, he was a Republican candidate for Indiana's open U.S. Senate seat being vacated by the retiring Evan Bayh, but lost the primary to former U.S. Senator Dan Coats, denying Hostettler a rematch with Ellsworth in the general election for Senate.

In February 2024, Hostettler announced he was running for his former house seat in 2024. He lost the Republican primary to Mark Messmer.

== Early life ==
Hostettler was born in Evansville, Indiana. He is of Swiss German and Irish descent.

After graduating from North Posey High School in 1979, he enrolled in Rose–Hulman Institute of Technology in Terre Haute, Indiana. He graduated with a Bachelor of Science in Mechanical Engineering (BSME) in 1983

== Congressional tenure ==
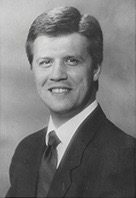
Hostettler earlier in his congressional career

Hostettler became part of the 104th Congress. In subsequent years, Hostettler depended on his base of fellow social and fiscal conservatives to keep him in office. While southern Indiana has been traditionally Democratic, the 8th has always had a strong social conservative tint.

Hostettler's campaign was distinctive in several respects. One of Hostettler's assets in his run for Congress was his distinctive "Red Army" or "Army of Red Volunteers." Parades and similar events would typically feature people of varying backgrounds wearing red t-shirts with white lettering that simply stated "Hostettler for Congress". Hostettler family members were particularly involved in campaign efforts. Karen Hammonds, Hostettler's sister, was also his office manager and a campaign coordinator. Being one of ten children, his brothers and sisters have assisted in campaign efforts. Media has attributed this as an area of success and influence that helped Hostettler achieve six straight victories.

Hostettler signed the Contract with America, but he told an Evansville Courier & Press reporter the day he signed it he did not support two provisions: a balanced budget amendment and term limits. He was one of 40 Republicans in the House to vote in March 1995 against a constitutional amendment to set 12-year term limits for Representatives.

In June 2005, Democratic Representative David Obey introduced a measure to declare congressional opposition to "coercive proselytizing" at the United States Air Force Academy after cadets complained that some of their evangelical Christian superior officers had pressured them about their religious beliefs. During debate on the measure on the House floor on June 20, 2005, Hostettler said: "Like a moth to a flame the Democrats can't help themselves when it comes to denigrating and demonizing Christians." Democrats objected and threatened to censure Hostettler for his comment. Debate did not resume until Hostettler withdrew his statement 20 minutes later.

In the aftermath of the June 2006 arrests of 17 alleged terrorist bomb-plotters in and around Toronto, Hostettler warned that Toronto was a "breeding ground for Islamic terrorists and that the United States will be under threat as long as passports are not required of all Canadians crossing the border."

=== Committee assignments ===
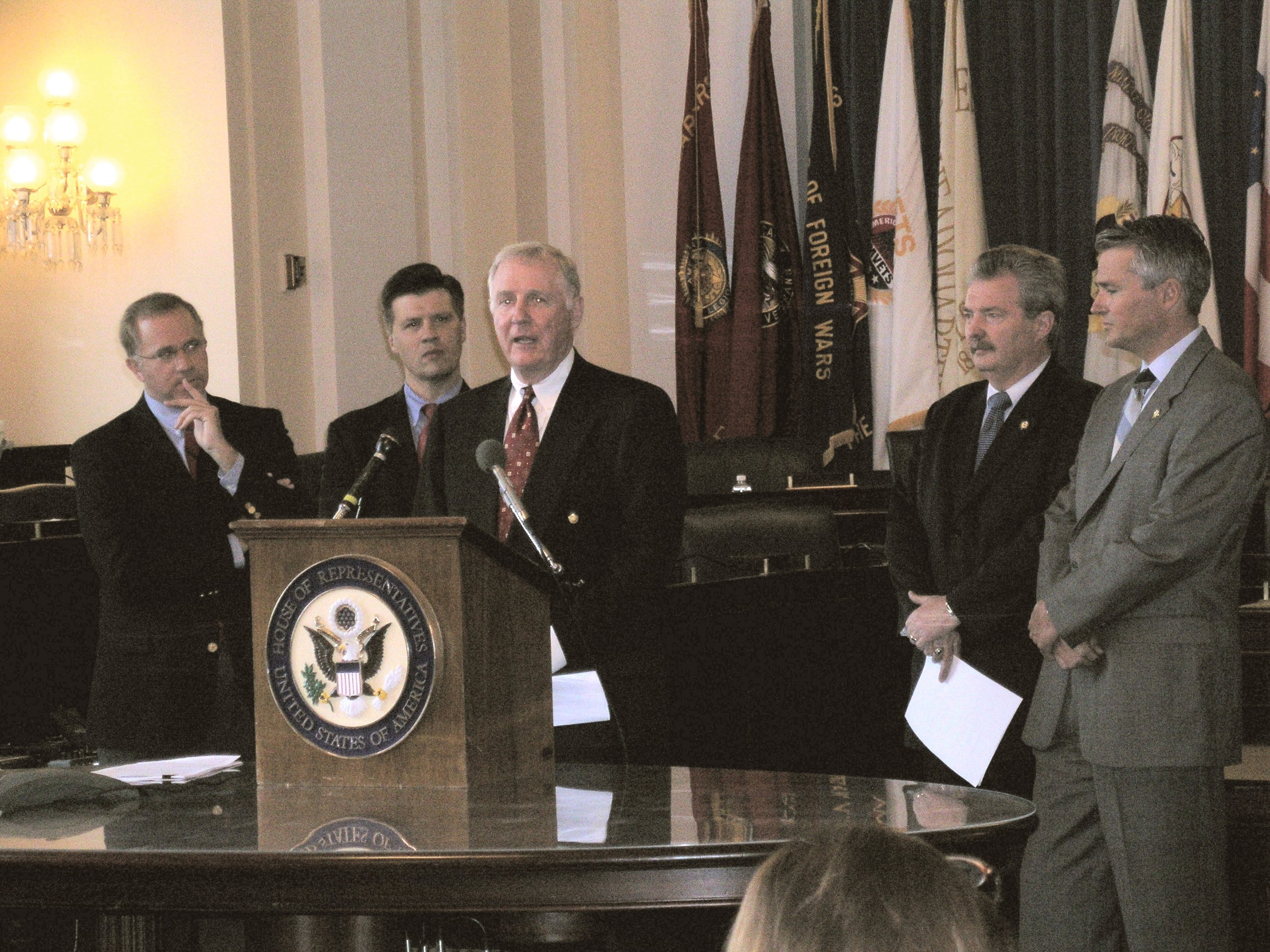
Hostettler at a joint press conference with Dan Burton, Steve Buyer, Mike Sodrel, and Chris Chocola in 2005

Hostettler served on the House Armed Services Committee and the Judiciary Committee. For 106th Congress, he was vice-chairman of the Armed Services Research and Development Subcommittee, and he was appointed the Chairman of the Judiciary Committee's Subcommittee on Immigration, Border Security, and Claims in 2003. He was also formerly a chairman of the Congressional Family Caucus and a member of the Republican Study Committee.

=== Legislative activity ===
In late 1995, Hostettler was the sponsor of a bill passed by the House to repeal a District of Columbia law that allowed city workers to register domestic partners for health benefits.

In January 1996, Hostettler was one of 17 Republicans who voted against a legislation supported by House Speaker Newt Gingrich that ended a federal government shutdown. After the vote, Gingrich canceled plans to visit Evansville for a fund-raising event for Hostettler. Gingrich offered to reschedule, but Hostettler turned him down, saying "I cannot allow my fund raising to be tied in any way to specific votes." That November would be Hostettler's closest re-election, against future Evansville Mayor Jon Weinzapfel.

In June 2000, Hostettler was one of 10 Republicans voting against a prescription drug bill that passed the House 217–214. The bill failed in the Senate.

In June 2001, Hostettler and Congressman Walter B. Jones of North Carolina (another member of the Republican class of 1995) co-authored a bill, H.R. 2357, to amend the Internal Revenue Code of 1986 to permit churches and other houses of worship to engage in political campaigns without losing their tax-exempt status. In October 2002 the bill was defeated in a 178 to 239 vote in the House.

On July 10, 2002, Hostettler introduced House Amendment 523 to House Resolution 4635, which would have removed the 2% cap on the number of pilots who could be deputized as federal flight deck officers and thus permitted to carry firearms to as well as requiring the Transportation Security Administration to train 20% of all pilots who volunteer for the program within six months of enactment and train 80% by the end of the two-year pilot program. There were no cosponsors to his amendment and it failed in a roll call vote.

On October 10, 2002, he was one of six House Republicans who voted against the Authorization for Use of Military Force Against Iraq Resolution of 2002 that authorized the invasion of Iraq. In a speech to the U.S. House on October 8, 2002, invoking St. Augustine's Just War Thesis, the Minutemen, and the Framers of the U.S. Constitution, Rep. Hostettler said that:

... Iraq indeed poses a threat, but it does not pose an imminent threat that justifies a pre-emptive military strike at this time.

On July 15, 2003, the House voted 226–198 on a Hostettler-sponsored amendment to the State Departments's "Foreign Relations Authorization Act" reauthorization bill for Fiscal Years 2004 and 2005, requiring tighter regulation of consular cards of foreign nations within the United States, including Mexico's "matricula consular" cards. The Senate did pass corresponding legislation in the 108th Congress.

Also in 2003, he amended the Commerce, State, and Justice appropriation bill to restrict any funding for a ruling calling by the Court of Appeals 11th Circuit for the removal of the Ten Commandments from the Alabama State Supreme Court House. Chief Justice Roy Moore, who was removed from office later in 2003, had placed a 5-ton granite monument that included the Ten Commandments in the rotunda of the Alabama Supreme Court building on July 31, 2001.

In 2004, the House passed the Hostettler-sponsored Marriage Protection Act (MPA). This kept federal courts from ruling on same-sex marriage licenses, as a result of Massachusetts' Supreme Court ruling on February 3, 2004, on the Massachusetts ban on same-sex marriage.

In September 2005, Hostettler was one of 11 representatives who voted against the $51.8 billion aid package for relief and recovery from Hurricane Katrina. Spokesman Matt Faraci said Hostettler voted against the hurricane measure because it included a provision making it easy for supposed do-gooders to pilfer federal funds. Faraci said that Hostettler would like to see federal funds spent helping victims of natural disasters so long as those dollars are not squandered. "He was very supportive of giving assistance to people affected by Rita and Katrina," Faraci said. "He was concerned that there were provisions in the bill that were open to abuse."

Hostettler had introduced legislation in five consecutive Congress' to prevent organizations such as the American Civil Liberties Union from collecting attorneys' fees when they win lawsuits challenging religious symbols on public land or religious groups' use of government property. Hostletter said in a speech in February 2006 that his bill would "restore legal balance in this country, and it will protect us from being the victims of this assault on our religious liberties". At least one columnist claimed that this change would allow teachers to force students to pray to their specific deity with no possibility of damages or attorney's fees. In other words, only those who could afford to hire an attorney to challenge the practice would be able to object in court. Since monetary damages were precluded, the only remedy would be an injunction.

In 2006, Hostettler voted against a constitutional amendment that defined marriage as being between a man and a woman.

== Congressional campaigns ==
=== 1994 election ===
In January 1994, he announced that he would run against Democrat Frank McCloskey, a six-term incumbent, in that year's election. Hostettler claimed his opponent was among the House's biggest-spending liberals. Hostettler also claimed McCloskey was too loyal to President Bill Clinton; he frequently referred to McCloskey as "Frank McClinton."

Hostettler was also inspired to enter politics after watching a television program by Dr. D. James Kennedy of Coral Ridge Ministries, interviewing Rev. Peter Marshall (son of the late Senate Chaplain Rev. Dr. Peter Marshall), whereby Rev. Marshall, historian and author, recounted a Christian Heritage of the United States of America.

Hostettler won 52%–48%, becoming the sixth challenger to oust an incumbent in the 8th since 1966. In part due to its volatile nature, the district had long been called "the Bloody Eighth."

=== 1996 election ===
In 1996, Hostettler defeated Democratic challenger Jonathan Weinzapfel 50%–48%. This was the narrowest win of his six Congressional victories. Weinzapfel later became mayor of Evansville.

=== 1998 election ===
In 1998, with a total of 92,785 votes, he defeated his Democratic challenger, Evansville City Councilwoman Gail Riecken, with 52% to Riecken's 46% of the vote.

=== 2000 election ===
In 2000, with 116,879 votes, Hostettler defeated Democratic challenger Paul Perry, a surgeon, with 53% of the vote to Perry's 45%.

Doctors for Hostettler, a group of 82 physicians operating in tandem with the Hostettler campaign, organized against the healthcare issues raised by the Perry campaign, a campaign that was healthcare-oriented almost exclusively.

Some attributed this organization as one of the critical factor in the 2000 election, as the subsequently inactive group's statements played a role in the 2006 campaign.

=== 2002 election ===
Redistricting after the 2000 census theoretically made the 8th friendlier to Hostettler. Heavily Democratic Bloomington was cut out of the district and replaced with more conservative-leaning Terre Haute. However, he defeated Democratic challenger Bryan Hartke by only five points—a narrower margin than 2000. He took 51% to Hartke's 46% percentage of the vote.

Hartke was the nephew of former Senator Vance Hartke.

=== 2004 election ===
In 2004, he defeated Democratic challenger Jon Jennings with 53% of the vote.

=== 2006 election ===
In 2006 Hostettler's Democratic opponent was Vanderburgh County Sheriff Brad Ellsworth. Like Hostettler, Ellsworth identified as a social conservative.

The National Republican Congressional Committee had spent $163,000 in his district as of mid-July 2006. (The DCCC, its counterpart, had spent $166,000 for Ellsworth as of that date.) He had never been a strong fundraiser; he never raised more than $800,000 in any campaign. Some attributed Hostettler's refusal to accept any political action committee money to his relatively low funding levels during campaigns. In part because of this, he was on somewhat less secure footing than conventional wisdom would suggest for a six-term incumbent.

As of early September, the Rothenberg Political Report called Hostettler one of the three most endangered House incumbents in the country; Chris Cillizza, political analyst for The Washington Post, ranked Hostettler as the most vulnerable House incumbent in the nation; and Robert D. Novak, a syndicated columnist and editor of the Evans-Novak Political Report, also rated Hostettler's seat a likely win for Ellsworth.

In mid-October, an opinion poll commissioned by the Evansville Courier & Press showed Ellsworth leading Hostettler, 55% to 32%.

Hostettler debated Ellsworth on October 23, 2006. The debate was at public television station WVUT at Vincennes University, and involved the League of Women Voters.

In the November election, Hostettler was soundly defeated, taking 39 percent of the vote to Ellsworth's 61 percent. He was the first House incumbent to lose reelection in 2006. The 22-point margin was the largest margin of defeat for an incumbent in the 2006 cycle, and the second-biggest margin of a defeat in a Republican-held district. Hostettler was the only incumbent in either party who did not receive 40% of the vote, although a few senators such as Rick Santorum and Mike DeWine came close. The 8th district vote tally for Ellsworth was only 1% shy of the same district's tally for President Bush in 2004.

== Post-congressional career ==
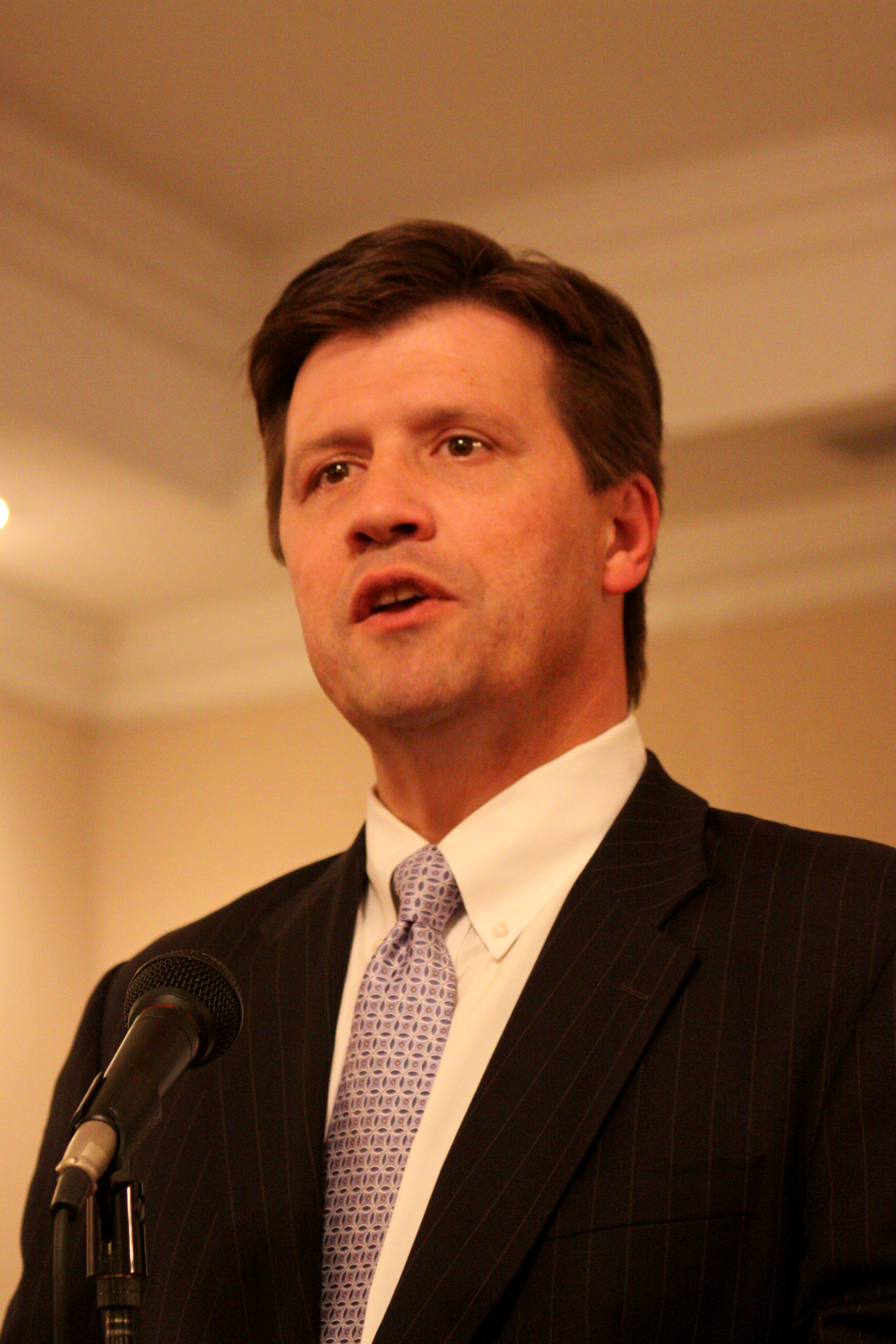
John Hostettler in 2010

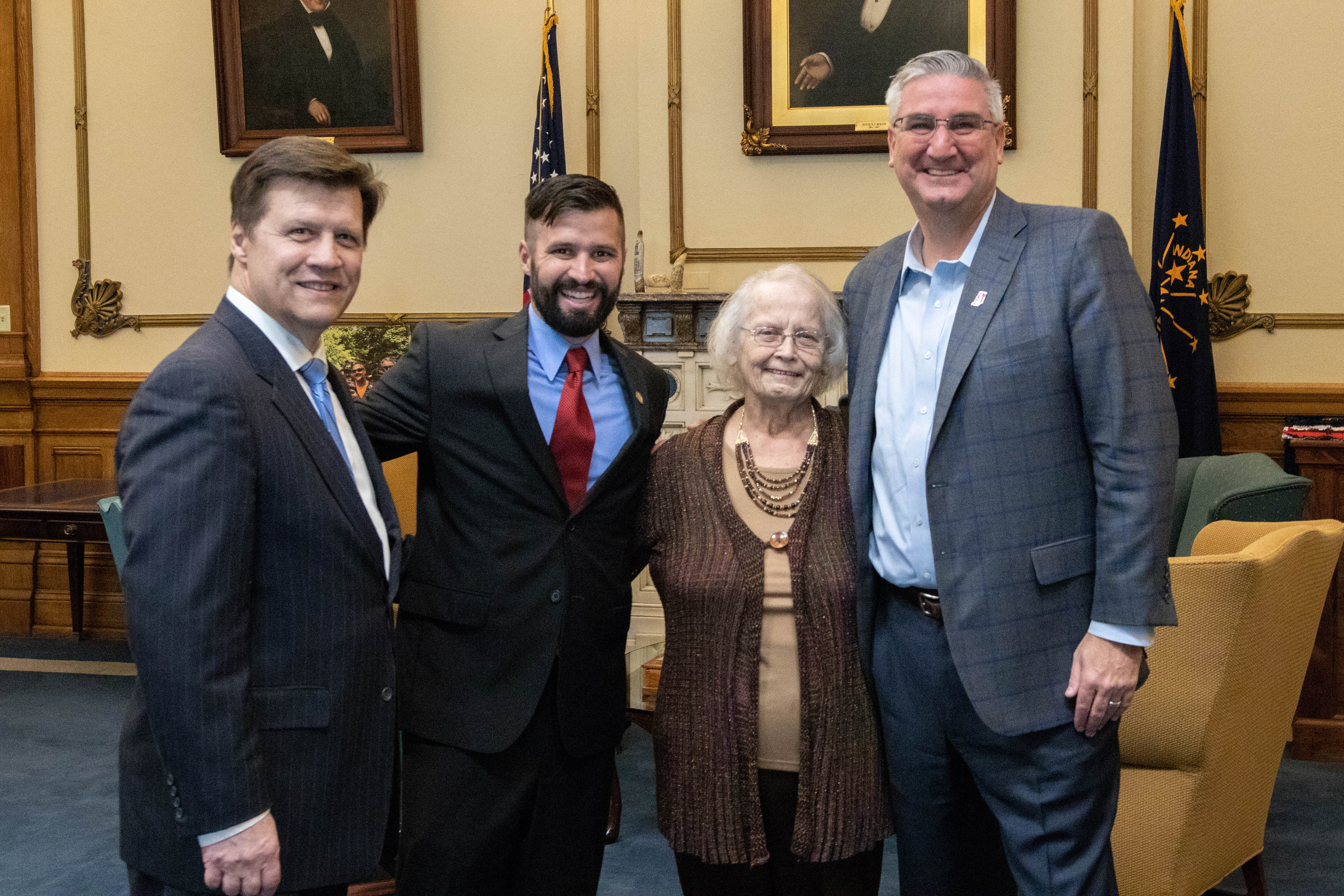
Hostettler and his son Matt with Governor Eric Holcomb in 2018

=== Book ===
In 2007, Hostettler decided to begin a book publishing company called Publius House. Nothing for the Nation – Who Got What Out of Iraq examines the true motives of American political leaders behind the invasion of Iraq in March 2003.

Hostettler said of the book that it "... reveals why political leaders and their subordinates sought to remove Saddam Hussein from power" and that there was an underlying and unapparent "motivation of those who sold America on the idea of ousting the Butcher of Baghdad."

=== Presidential election ===
Hostettler endorsed Chuck Baldwin, nominee of the Constitution Party in the 2008 presidential election. He spoke at the Constitution Party's national committee meeting in Orlando, Florida, on December 12–13, 2008. Prior to his announcement on December 3, 2009, Hostettler was highly mentioned as a possible candidate to run against Evan Bayh.

=== 2010 U.S. Senate election ===
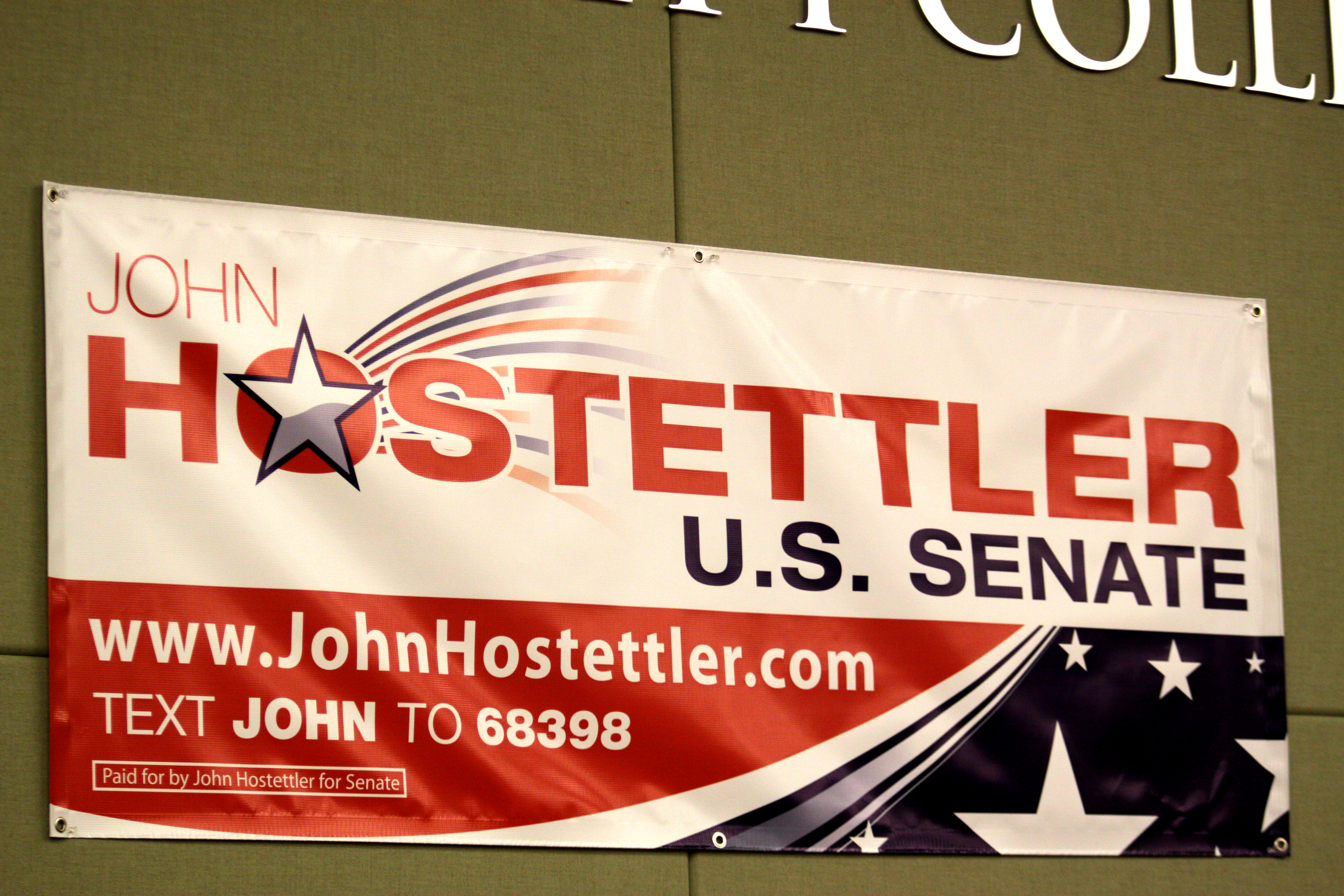
Hostettler for Senate campaign sign

Hostettler officially announced in a video posted by the campaign on December 3, 2009, that he would seek the office held by retiring United States Senator Evan Bayh in the 2010 election, following much speculation.

Hostettler had been widely reported to be the leading Republican in the race even after former Senator and Lobbyist Dan Coats announced in February that he would relocate to Indiana and attempt to challenge Hostettler for the open seat, but ultimately placed third in the primary.

=== Texas Public Policy Foundation ===
In February 2019, Hostettler joined the Texas Public Policy Foundation as the head of the organization's state-based policy efforts. The Texas Public Policy Foundation States Trust initiative is pushing for a reduction of federal involvement in the education system as well as for guest worker programs to allow states to fill employment needs.

== Political positions ==
Hostettler was one of the "true believers" in the Republican freshman class of 1995. He believed the U.S. Constitution should be strictly interpreted and was very critical of government actions—especially those of judges—that he felt overstepped their constitutional limits. Even those who disagreed with Hostettler felt that they knew where he stood and would likely give him the benefit of the doubt that he regularly voted in principle and not for political ends.

He is anti-abortion and opposes gun control. He favors the dissolution of the Department of Education, and voted against the No Child Left Behind Act because he felt education was a state matter. He also voted against most federal health care bills with the view that health care is a private or state matter. He maintains that many federal environmental laws and regulations infringed on individuals' property rights. Hostettler voted against the Federal Marriage Amendment in both 2004 and 2006, due to what he construed as ambiguous wording that would have allowed civil unions and domestic partnerships.

Hostettler was very active on issues of religious freedom and expression. For example, during his last term, he was the chief sponsor of the Veterans' Memorials, Boy Scouts, Public Seals, and Other Public Expressions of Religion Protection Act of 2006, which would have prevented attorneys who successfully challenge violations of the Establishment Clause from collecting attorneys' fees.

On economic issues, he supported repeal of the estate tax, the capital gains tax and the "marriage tax penalty."

Hostettler was a hawk by inclination (he strongly supported the Strategic Defense Initiative). However, he was one of the leading Republican opponents of the Iraq War. He felt that preemptive military strikes were improper, and also felt that the military should not go into action unless there was an "imminent threat" to national security.

Hostettler was a hardliner on immigration issues:

... the Constitution ... is very clear. These are violations of our immigration law, and those that violate our immigration law should be dealt with, and should be punished, and should be ultimately deported.

== Awards and commendations ==
- The National Federation of Independent Business (NFIB) bestowed upon Hostettler the Guardian of Small Business Award in 2000 because of attaining a 94% favorable rating with their organization, markedly above the 70% requirement for the award.
- In 2001, the National Taxpayers Union (NTU) presented to Hostettler the Taxpayers' Friend Award which he shared with 41 other Congressional Members that year.
- The National Taxpayers Union (NTU) gave, for second consecutive year, the Taxpayers' Friend Award to John Hostettler along with 35 other lawmakers in 2002.
- In 2004, Hostettler received the Distinguished Christian Statesman Award from the Center for Christian Statesmanship, an outreach of Coral Ridge Ministries and Dr. D. James Kennedy.
- He received a perfect 100% rating from the American Conservative Union in 2005.
- In 2006, 9/11 Families for a Secure America gave Hostettler the Homeland Defender Award

== Airport firearm possession ==
On April 20, 2004, Hostettler was briefly detained at the Louisville International Airport when he attempted to board a flight for Washington, D.C., with a loaded 9 mm Glock pistol in his briefcase The congressman explained he "completely forgot" the gun was there, and called it a rather stupid mistake. His spokesman said Hostettler never brought the gun, registered to the Congressman, to Washington, where handguns are illegal. Hostettler did not have a house or apartment in D.C., but slept in his office.

In August, Hostettler pleaded guilty to carrying a concealed weapon. He agreed to a plea-bargained sentence of 60 days in jail, with the jail time to be conditionally discharged rather than served if he had no more legal problems in the next two years. On October 4, 2004, a Kentucky judge issued a bench warrant for his arrest after Hostettler failed to pay court costs, but it was recalled the same day after his attorney paid the $122.50.

Hostettler received strong support over the gun incident from an aviation security expert, Joseph Gutheinz, a retired NASA Office of Inspector General (OIG) Senior Special Agent and a former Special Agent with both U.S. Department of Transportation OIG and FAA Civil Aviation Security. In his Op/Ed appearing in the Courier Journal, Gutheinz said that rather than charging Hostettler for an obvious mistake, law enforcement "could have ... and should have exercised discretion ... by not charging him for bringing his weapon through security at Louisville International Airport." Gutheinz is a well known critic of letting pilots fly armed.

U.S. House of Representatives
Preceded by Frank McCloskey	Member of the U.S. House of Representatives from Indiana's 8th congressional district 1995–2007	Succeeded by Brad Ellsworth
U.S. order of precedence (ceremonial)
Preceded by Tim Roemer as Former U.S. Representative	Order of precedence of the United States as Former U.S. Representative	Succeeded by Chip Pickering as Former U.S. Representative
