= Indiana's congressional delegations =

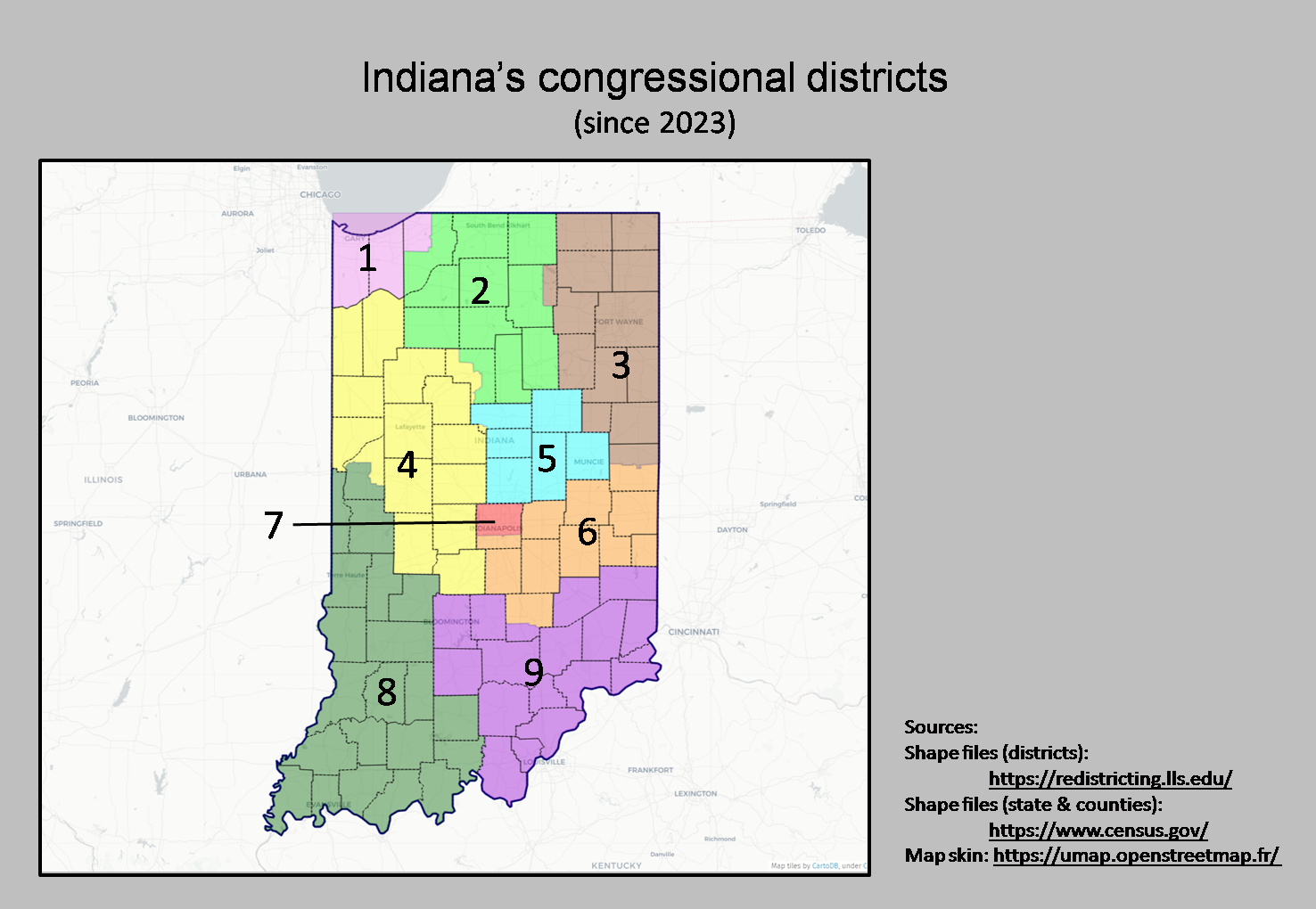
Indiana's congressional districts since 2023

These are tables of congressional delegations from Indiana to the United States House of Representatives and the United States Senate.

Since its statehood in 1816, the U.S. state of Indiana has sent congressional delegations to the United States Senate and United States House of Representatives. Each state elects two senators statewide to serve for six years, and their elections are staggered to be held in two of every three even-numbered years—Indiana's Senate election years are to Classes I and III. Before the Seventeenth Amendment in 1913, senators were elected by the Indiana General Assembly. Members of the House of Representatives are elected to two-year terms, one from each of Indiana's nine congressional districts. Before becoming a state, the Indiana Territory elected delegates at-large and sent three to Congress, but the territorial delegates were restricted from voting on legislation.

The longest-serving of any of Indiana's Congressmen is Senator Richard Lugar, serving from 1977 to 2013, and the longest-serving House member is Pete Visclosky who served from 1985 to 2021. Both have served 36 years in congress. There have been 347 people who have represented Indiana in Congress: 321 in the House, 27 in the Senate, and 18 in both houses, with an average term of seven years. Indiana has elected seven women and three African Americans to Congress.

The current dean of the Indiana delegation is Representative André Carson (IN-7), having served in Congress since 2008.

== U.S. House of Representatives ==
=== Current members ===
List of members of the House delegation, their terms in office, district boundaries, and the district political ratings according to the CPVI. The delegation has a total of 9 members, including 7 Republicans and 2 Democrats.

Current U.S. representatives from Indiana
District	Member (residence)	Party	Incumbent since	CPVI (2025)	District map
1st	Frank J. Mrvan (Highland)	Democratic	January 3, 2021	D+1	
2nd	Rudy Yakym (Granger)	Republican	November 14, 2022	R+13	
3rd	Marlin Stutzman (Howe)	Republican	January 3, 2025	R+16	
4th	Jim Baird (Greencastle)	Republican	January 3, 2019	R+15	
5th	Victoria Spartz (Noblesville)	Republican	January 3, 2021	R+8	
6th	Jefferson Shreve (Indianapolis)	Republican	January 3, 2025	R+16	
7th	André Carson (Indianapolis)	Democratic	March 11, 2008	D+21	
8th	Mark Messmer (Jasper)	Republican	January 3, 2025	R+18	
9th	Erin Houchin (Salem)	Republican	January 3, 2023	R+15	

Members of the House of Representatives are elected every two years by popular vote within a congressional district. Indiana has nine congressional districts—this number is reapportioned based on the state's population, determined every ten years by a census. Indiana had a maximum representation of 13 congressmen from 1873 to 1933. Since 2003 Indiana has had nine representatives, which was reduced from ten after the 2000 census. This gives Indiana the fourteenth-largest delegation; during the period from 1853 to 1873 the state had the fifth-largest delegation.

=== Historical timeline ===
Indiana has been represented by 322 people in the House, including 1 who was previously a territorial delegate.

Anti-Monopoly (A-M) Democratic (D) Democratic-Republican (DR) Free Soil (FS) Greenback (GB)
Independent (I) National Republican National Union (NU) Opposition (O) Republican (R) Whig (W)

==== 1815–1823: 1 at-large seat ====
Congress	At-large
14th (1815–1817)	William Hendricks (DR)
15th (1817–1819)	William Hendricks (DR)
16th (1819–1821)	William Hendricks (DR)
17th (1821–1823)	William Hendricks (DR)
17th (1821–1823)	Jonathan Jennings (DR)

==== 1823–1833: 3 seats ====
Congress	1st district	2nd district	3rd district
18th (1823–1825)	William Prince (DR) (Note: Died)	Jonathan Jennings (DR)	John Test (DR)
18th (1823–1825)	Jacob Call (DR) (Note: Call won the election to fill the vacancy left by Rep. Prince's death. He started to serve on December 24, 1824.)	Jonathan Jennings (DR)	John Test (DR)
19th (1825–1827)	Ratliff Boon (J)	Jonathan Jennings (NR)	John Test (NR)
20th (1827–1829)	Thomas H. Blake (NR)	Jonathan Jennings (NR)	Oliver H. Smith (I)
21st (1829–1831)	Ratliff Boon (J)	Jonathan Jennings (NR)	John Test (NR)
22nd (1831–1833)	Ratliff Boon (J)	John Carr (J)	Johnathan McCarty (J)

==== 1833–1843: 7 seats ====
Congress	1st district	2nd district	3rd district	4th district	5th district	6th district	7th district
23rd (1833–1835)	Ratliff Boon (J)	John Ewing (NR)	John Carr (J)	Amos Lane (J)	Johnathan McCarty (J)	George L. Kinnard (J)	Ned Hannegan (J)
24th (1835–1837)	Ratliff Boon (J)	John Wesley Davis (J)	John Carr (J)	Amos Lane (J)	Johnathan McCarty (NR)	George L. Kinnard (J)	Ned Hannegan (J)
25th (1837–1839)	Ratliff Boon (D)	John Ewing (W)	William Graham (W)	George H. Dunn (W)	James Rariden (W)	William Herod (W)	Albert Smith White (W)
26th (1839–1841)	George H. Proffit (W)	John Wesley Davis (D)	John Carr (D)	Thomas Smith (D)	James Rariden (W)	William W. Wick (D)	Tilghman Howard (D)
27th (1841–1843)	George H. Proffit (W)	Richard W. Thompson (W)	Joseph L. White (W)	James H. Cravens (W)	Andrew Kennedy (D)	David Wallace (W)	Henry S. Lane (W)

==== 1843–1853: 10 seats ====
Congress	1st district	2nd district	3rd district	4th district	5th district	6th district	7th district	8th district	9th district	10th district
28th (1843–1845)	Robert D. Owen (D)	Thomas J. Henley (D)	Thomas; Smith (D)	Caleb B. Smith (W)	William J. Brown (D)	John Wesley; Davis (D)	Joseph A. Wright (D)	John; Pettit (D)	Samuel C. Sample (W)	Andrew; Kennedy (D)
29th (1845–1847)	Robert D. Owen (D)	Thomas J. Henley (D)	Thomas; Smith (D)	Caleb B. Smith (W)	William W. Wick (D)	John Wesley; Davis (D)	Edward W. McGaughey (W)	John; Pettit (D)	Charles W. Cathcart (D)	Andrew; Kennedy (D)
30th (1847–1849)	Elisha; Embree (W)	Thomas J. Henley (D)	John L. Robinson (D)	Caleb B. Smith (W)	William W. Wick (D)	George Grundy; Dunn (W)	Richard W. Thompson (W)	John; Pettit (D)	Charles W. Cathcart (D)	William R. Rockhill (D)
31st (1849–1851)	Nathaniel; Albertson (D)	Cyrus L. Dunham (D)	John L. Robinson (D)	George W. Julian (FS)	William J. Brown (D)	Willis A. Gorman (D)	Edward W. McGaughey (W)	Joseph E. McDonald (D)	Graham N. Fitch (D)	Andrew J. Harlan (D)
32nd (1851–1853)	James; Lockhart (D)	Cyrus L. Dunham (D)	John L. Robinson (D)	Samuel W. Parker (W)	Thomas A. Hendricks (D)	Willis A. Gorman (D)	John G. Davis (D)	Daniel; Mace (D)	Graham N. Fitch (D)	Samuel; Brenton (W)

==== 1853–1873: 11 seats ====
Congress	1st district	2nd district	3rd district	4th district	5th district	6th district	7th district	8th district	9th district	10th district	11th district
33rd (1853–1855)	Smith; Miller (D)	William; English (D)	Cyrus L. Dunham (D)	Jim; Lane (D)	Samuel W. Parker (W)	Thomas A. Hendricks (D)	John G. Davis (D)	Daniel; Mace (D)	Norman; Eddy (D)	E. M. Chamberlain (D)	Andrew J. Harlan (D)
34th (1855–1857)	Smith; Miller (D)	William; English (D)	George Grundy; Dunn (P)	William; Cumback (P)	David P. Holloway (P)	Lucien; Barbour (P)	Harvey D. Scott (P)	Daniel; Mace (P)	Schuyler; Colfax (P)	Samuel; Brenton (P)	John U. Pettit (P)
35th (1857–1859)	James; Lockhart (D)	William; English (D)	James; Hughes (D)	James B. Foley (D)	David; Kilgore (R)	James M. Gregg (D)	John G. Davis (D) (Note: Anti-Lecompton Democrat)	James; Wilson (R)	Schuyler; Colfax (R)	Samuel; Brenton (R)	John U. Pettit (R)
35th (1857–1859)	William E. Niblack (D)	William; English (D)	James; Hughes (D)	James B. Foley (D)	David; Kilgore (R)	James M. Gregg (D)	John G. Davis (D)	James; Wilson (R)	Schuyler; Colfax (R)	Charles; Case (R)	John U. Pettit (R)
36th (1859–1861)	William E. Niblack (D)	William; English (D)	William; McKee; Dunn (R)	William S. Holman (D)	David; Kilgore (R)	Albert G. Porter (R)	John G. Davis (D)	James; Wilson (R)	Schuyler; Colfax (R)	Charles; Case (R)	John U. Pettit (R)
37th (1861–1863)	John; Law (D)	James A. Cravens (D)	William; McKee; Dunn (R)	William S. Holman (D)	George W. Julian (R)	Albert G. Porter (R)	Daniel W. Voorhees (D)	Albert Smith; White (R)	Schuyler; Colfax (R)	William; Mitchell (R)	John P. C. Shanks (R)
38th (1863–1865)	John; Law (D)	James A. Cravens (D)	Henry W. Harrington (D)	William S. Holman (D)	George W. Julian (R)	Ebenezer; Dumont (R)	Daniel W. Voorhees (D)	Godlove S. Orth (R)	Schuyler; Colfax (R)	Joseph K. Edgerton (D)	James F. McDowell (D)
39th (1865–1867)	William E. Niblack (D)	Michael C. Kerr (D)	Ralph; Hill (R)	John H. Farquhar (R)	George W. Julian (R)	Ebenezer; Dumont (R)	Daniel W. Voorhees (D)	Godlove S. Orth (R)	Schuyler; Colfax (R)	Joseph H. Defrees (R)	Thomas N. Stilwell (R)
39th (1865–1867)	William E. Niblack (D)	Michael C. Kerr (D)	Ralph; Hill (R)	John H. Farquhar (R)	George W. Julian (R)	Ebenezer; Dumont (R)	Henry D. Washburn (R)	Godlove S. Orth (R)	Schuyler; Colfax (R)	Joseph H. Defrees (R)	Thomas N. Stilwell (R)
40th (1867–1869)	William E. Niblack (D)	Michael C. Kerr (D)	Morton C. Hunter (R)	William S. Holman (D)	George W. Julian (R)	John; Coburn (R)	Henry D. Washburn (R)	Godlove S. Orth (R)	Schuyler; Colfax (R)	William; Williams (R)	John P. C. Shanks (R)
41st (1869–1871)	William E. Niblack (D)	Michael C. Kerr (D)	William S. Holman (D)	George W. Julian (R)	John; Coburn (R)	Daniel W. Voorhees (D)	Godlove S. Orth (R)	James; Tyner (R)	John P. C. Shanks (R)	William; Williams (R)	Jasper; Packard (R)
42nd (1871–1873)	William E. Niblack (D)	Michael C. Kerr (D)	William S. Holman (D)	Jeremiah M. Wilson (R)	John; Coburn (R)	Daniel W. Voorhees (D)	Mahlon D. Manson (D)	James; Tyner (R)	John P. C. Shanks (R)	William; Williams (R)	Jasper; Packard (R)

==== 1873–1933: 13 seats ====
Congress	1st district	2nd district	3rd district	4th district	5th district	6th district	7th district	8th district	9th district	10th district	At-large seat	At-large seat	At-large seat
43rd (1873–1875)	William E. Niblack (D)	Simeon K. Wolfe (D)	William S. Holman (D)	Jeremiah M. Wilson (R)	John; Coburn (R)	Morton C. Hunter (R)	Thomas J. Cason (R)	James; Tyner (R)	John P. C. Shanks (R)	Henry B. Sayler (R)	Jasper; Packard (R)	Godlove S. Orth (R)	William; Williams (R)
44th (1875–1877)	Benoni S. Fuller (D)	James D. Williams (D) (Note: Rep. Williams resigned on December 1, 1876, to run for Governor of Indiana.)	Michael C. Kerr (D)	Jeptha D. New (D)	William S. Holman (D)	Milton S. Robinson (R)	Franklin; Landers (D)	Morton C. Hunter (R)	Thomas J. Cason (R)	William S. Haymond (D)	11th district	12th district	13th district
44th (1875–1877)	Benoni S. Fuller (D)	Andrew; Humphreys (D) (Note: Humphreys won the election to fill the vacancy left by Rep. Williams's resignation. He started to serve on December 5, 1876.)	Nathan T. Carr (D) (Note: Carr won the election to fill the vacancy left by Rep. Kerr's death. He started to serve on December 5, 1876.)	Jeptha D. New (D)	William S. Holman (D)	Milton S. Robinson (R)	Franklin; Landers (D)	Morton C. Hunter (R)	Thomas J. Cason (R)	William S. Haymond (D)	James L. Evans (R)	Andrew H. Hamilton (D)	John; Baker (R)
45th (1877–1879)	Benoni S. Fuller (D)	Thomas R. Cobb (D)	George A. Bicknell (D)	Leonidas; Sexton (R)	Thomas M. Browne (R)	Milton S. Robinson (R)	John; Hanna (R)	Morton C. Hunter (R)	Michael D. White (R)	William H. Calkins (R)	James L. Evans (R)	Andrew H. Hamilton (D)	John; Baker (R)
46th (1879–1881)	William; Heilman (R)	Thomas R. Cobb (D)	George A. Bicknell (D)	Jeptha D. New (D)	Thomas M. Browne (R)	William R. Myers (D)	Gilbert De La; Matyr (GB)	Abraham J. Hostetler (D)	Godlove; S. Orth (R)	William H. Calkins (R)	Calvin; Cowgill (R)	Walpole G. Colerick (D)	John; Baker (R)
47th (1881–1883)	William; Heilman (R)	Thomas R. Cobb (D)	Strother M. Stockslager (D)	William S. Holman (D)	Courtland C. Matson (D)	Thomas M. Browne (R)	Stanton J. Peelle (R)	Robert B. F. Peirce (R)	Godlove; S. Orth (R)	Mark L. De Motte (R)	George W. Steele (R)	Walpole G. Colerick (D)	William H. Calkins (R)
47th (1881–1883)	William; Heilman (R)	Thomas R. Cobb (D)	Strother M. Stockslager (D)	William S. Holman (D)	Courtland C. Matson (D)	Thomas M. Browne (R)	Stanton J. Peelle (R)	Robert B. F. Peirce (R)	Charles T. Doxey (R)	Mark L. De Motte (R)	George W. Steele (R)	Walpole G. Colerick (D)	William H. Calkins (R)
48th (1883–1885)	John J. Kleiner (D)	Thomas R. Cobb (D)	Strother M. Stockslager (D)	William S. Holman (D)	Courtland C. Matson (D)	Thomas M. Browne (R)	Stanton J. Peelle (R)	John E. Lamb (D)	Thomas B. Ward (D)	Thomas J. Wood (D)	George W. Steele (R)	Robert; Lowry (D)	William H. Calkins (R)
48th (1883–1885)	John J. Kleiner (D)	Thomas R. Cobb (D)	Strother M. Stockslager (D)	William S. Holman (D)	Courtland C. Matson (D)	Thomas M. Browne (R)	William E. English (D)	John E. Lamb (D)	Thomas B. Ward (D)	Thomas J. Wood (D)	George W. Steele (R)	Robert; Lowry (D)	Benjamin F. Shively (A-M)
49th (1885–1887)	John J. Kleiner (D)	Thomas R. Cobb (D)	Jonas G. Howard (D)	William S. Holman (D)	Courtland C. Matson (D)	Thomas M. Browne (R)	William D. Bynum (D)	James T. Johnston (R)	Thomas B. Ward (D)	William D. Owen (R)	George W. Steele (R)	Robert; Lowry (D)	George; Ford (D)
50th (1887–1889)	Alvin Hovey (R)	John H. O'Neall (D)	Jonas G. Howard (D)	William S. Holman (D)	Courtland C. Matson (D)	Thomas M. Browne (R)	William D. Bynum (D)	James T. Johnston (R)	Joseph B. Cheadle (R)	William D. Owen (R)	George W. Steele (R)	James Bain; White (R)	Benjamin F. Shively (D)
50th (1887–1889)	F. B. Posey (R) (Note: Posey won the election to fill the vacancy left by Rep. Hovey's death. He started to serve on January 29, 1889.)	John H. O'Neall (D)	Jonas G. Howard (D)	William S. Holman (D)	Courtland C. Matson (D)	Thomas M. Browne (R)	William D. Bynum (D)	James T. Johnston (R)	Joseph B. Cheadle (R)	William D. Owen (R)	George W. Steele (R)	James Bain; White (R)	Benjamin F. Shively (D)
51st (1889–1891)	William F. Parrett (D)	John H. O'Neall (D)	Jason B. Brown (D)	William S. Holman (D)	George W. Cooper (D)	Thomas M. Browne (R)	William D. Bynum (D)	Elijah V. Brookshire (D)	Joseph B. Cheadle (R)	William D. Owen (R)	Augustus N. Martin (D)	Charles A. O. McClellan (D)	Benjamin F. Shively (D)
52nd (1891–1893)	William F. Parrett (D)	John L. Bretz (D)	Jason B. Brown (D)	William S. Holman (D)	George W. Cooper (D)	Henry U. Johnson (R)	William D. Bynum (D)	Elijah V. Brookshire (D)	Daniel W. Waugh (R)	David H. Patton (D)	Augustus N. Martin (D)	Charles A. O. McClellan (D)	Benjamin F. Shively (D)
53rd (1893–1895)	Arthur H. Taylor (D)	John L. Bretz (D)	Jason B. Brown (D)	William S. Holman (D)	George W. Cooper (D)	Henry U. Johnson (R)	William D. Bynum (D)	Elijah V. Brookshire (D)	Daniel W. Waugh (R)	Thomas; Hammond (D)	Augustus N. Martin (D)	William F. McNagny (D)	Charles G. Conn (D)
54th (1895–1897)	James A. Hemenway (R)	Alexander M. Hardy (R)	Robert J. Tracewell (R)	James E. Watson (R)	Jesse; Overstreet (R)	Henry U. Johnson (R)	Charles L. Henry (R)	George W. Faris (R)	Frank; Hanly (R)	Jethro A. Hatch (R)	George W. Steele (R)	Jacob D. Leighty (R)	Lemuel W. Royse (R)
55th (1897–1899)	James A. Hemenway (R)	Robert W. Miers (D)	William T. Zenor (D)	William S. Holman (D)	George W. Faris (R)	Henry U. Johnson (R)	Jesse; Overstreet (R)	Charles L. Henry (R)	Charles B. Landis (R)	Edgar D. Crumpacker (R)	George W. Steele (R)	James M. Robinson (D)	Lemuel W. Royse (R)
55th (1897–1899)	James A. Hemenway (R)	Robert W. Miers (D)	William T. Zenor (D)	Francis M. Griffith (D)	George W. Faris (R)	Henry U. Johnson (R)	Jesse; Overstreet (R)	Charles L. Henry (R)	Charles B. Landis (R)	Edgar D. Crumpacker (R)	George W. Steele (R)	James M. Robinson (D)	Lemuel W. Royse (R)
56th (1899–1901)	James A. Hemenway (R)	Robert W. Miers (D)	William T. Zenor (D)	Francis M. Griffith (D)	George W. Faris (R)	James E. Watson (R)	Jesse; Overstreet (R)	George W. Cromer (R)	Charles B. Landis (R)	Edgar D. Crumpacker (R)	George W. Steele (R)	James M. Robinson (D)	Abraham L. Brick (R)
57th (1901–1903)	James A. Hemenway (R)	Robert W. Miers (D)	William T. Zenor (D)	Francis M. Griffith (D)	Elias S. Holliday (R)	James E. Watson (R)	Jesse; Overstreet (R)	George W. Cromer (R)	Charles B. Landis (R)	Edgar D. Crumpacker (R)	George W. Steele (R)	James M. Robinson (D)	Abraham L. Brick (R)
58th (1903–1905)	James A. Hemenway (R)	Robert W. Miers (D)	William T. Zenor (D)	Francis M. Griffith (D)	Elias S. Holliday (R)	James E. Watson (R)	Jesse; Overstreet (R)	George W. Cromer (R)	Charles B. Landis (R)	Edgar D. Crumpacker (R)	Frederick; Landis (R)	James M. Robinson (D)	Abraham L. Brick (R)
59th (1905–1907)	John H. Foster (R)	John C. Chaney (R)	William T. Zenor (D)	Lincoln; Dixon (D)	Elias S. Holliday (R)	James E. Watson (R)	Jesse; Overstreet (R)	George W. Cromer (R)	Charles B. Landis (R)	Edgar D. Crumpacker (R)	Frederick; Landis (R)	Newton W. Gilbert (R)	Abraham L. Brick (R)
60th (1907–1909)	John H. Foster (R)	John C. Chaney (R)	William E. Cox (D)	Lincoln; Dixon (D)	Elias S. Holliday (R)	James E. Watson (R)	Jesse; Overstreet (R)	John A. M. Adair (D)	Charles B. Landis (R)	Edgar D. Crumpacker (R)	George W. Rauch (D)	Clarence C. Gilhams (R)	Abraham L. Brick (R)
61st (1909–1911)	John W. Boehne (D)	William A. Cullop (D)	William E. Cox (D)	Lincoln; Dixon (D)	Ralph W. Moss (D)	William O. Barnard (R)	Charles A. Korbly (D)	John A. M. Adair (D)	Martin A. Morrison (D)	Edgar D. Crumpacker (R)	George W. Rauch (D)	Cyrus; Cline (D)	Henry A. Barnhart (D)
62nd (1911–1913)	John W. Boehne (D)	William A. Cullop (D)	William E. Cox (D)	Lincoln; Dixon (D)	Ralph W. Moss (D)	Finly H. Gray (D)	Charles A. Korbly (D)	John A. M. Adair (D)	Martin A. Morrison (D)	Edgar D. Crumpacker (R)	George W. Rauch (D)	Cyrus; Cline (D)	Henry A. Barnhart (D)
63rd (1913–1915)	Charles; Lieb (D)	William A. Cullop (D)	William E. Cox (D)	Lincoln; Dixon (D)	Ralph W. Moss (D)	Finly H. Gray (D)	Charles A. Korbly (D)	John A. M. Adair (D)	Martin A. Morrison (D)	John B. Peterson (D)	George W. Rauch (D)	Cyrus; Cline (D)	Henry A. Barnhart (D)
64th (1915–1917)	Charles; Lieb (D)	William A. Cullop (D)	William E. Cox (D)	Lincoln; Dixon (D)	Ralph W. Moss (D)	Finly H. Gray (D)	Merrill; Moores (R)	John A. M. Adair (D)	Martin A. Morrison (D)	William R. Wood (R)	George W. Rauch (D)	Cyrus; Cline (D)	Henry A. Barnhart (D)
65th (1917–1919)	George K. Denton (D)	Oscar E. Bland (R)	William E. Cox (D)	Lincoln; Dixon (D)	Everett; Sanders (R)	Daniel W. Comstock (R)	Merrill; Moores (R)	Albert H. Vestal (R)	Fred S. Purnell (R)	William R. Wood (R)	Milton; Kraus (R)	Louis W. Fairfield (R)	Henry A. Barnhart (D)
65th (1917–1919)	George K. Denton (D)	Oscar E. Bland (R)	William E. Cox (D)	Lincoln; Dixon (D)	Everett; Sanders (R)	Richard N. Elliott (R)	Merrill; Moores (R)	Albert H. Vestal (R)	Fred S. Purnell (R)	William R. Wood (R)	Milton; Kraus (R)	Louis W. Fairfield (R)	Henry A. Barnhart (D)
66th (1919–1921)	Oscar R. Luhring (R)	Oscar E. Bland (R)	James W. Dunbar (R)	John S. Benham (R)	Everett; Sanders (R)	Richard N. Elliott (R)	Merrill; Moores (R)	Albert H. Vestal (R)	Fred S. Purnell (R)	William R. Wood (R)	Milton; Kraus (R)	Louis W. Fairfield (R)	Andrew J. Hickey (R)
67th (1921–1923)	Oscar R. Luhring (R)	Oscar E. Bland (R)	James W. Dunbar (R)	John S. Benham (R)	Everett; Sanders (R)	Richard N. Elliott (R)	Merrill; Moores (R)	Albert H. Vestal (R)	Fred S. Purnell (R)	William R. Wood (R)	Milton; Kraus (R)	Louis W. Fairfield (R)	Andrew J. Hickey (R)
68th (1923–1925)	William E. Wilson (D)	Arthur H. Greenwood (D)	Frank; Gardner (D)	Harry C. Canfield (D)	Everett; Sanders (R)	Richard N. Elliott (R)	Merrill; Moores (R)	Albert H. Vestal (R)	Fred S. Purnell (R)	William R. Wood (R)	Samuel E. Cook (D)	Louis W. Fairfield (R)	Andrew J. Hickey (R)
69th (1925–1927)	Harry E. Rowbottom (R)	Arthur H. Greenwood (D)	Frank; Gardner (D)	Harry C. Canfield (D)	Noble J. Johnson (R)	Richard N. Elliott (R)	Ralph E. Updike (R)	Albert H. Vestal (R)	Fred S. Purnell (R)	William R. Wood (R)	Albert R. Hall (R)	David; Hogg (R)	Andrew J. Hickey (R)
70th (1927–1929)	Harry E. Rowbottom (R)	Arthur H. Greenwood (D)	Frank; Gardner (D)	Harry C. Canfield (D)	Noble J. Johnson (R)	Richard N. Elliott (R)	Ralph E. Updike (R)	Albert H. Vestal (R)	Fred S. Purnell (R)	William R. Wood (R)	Albert R. Hall (R)	David; Hogg (R)	Andrew J. Hickey (R)
71st (1929–1931)	Harry E. Rowbottom (R)	Arthur H. Greenwood (D)	James W. Dunbar (R)	Harry C. Canfield (D)	Noble J. Johnson (R)	Richard N. Elliott (R)	Louis; Ludlow (D)	Albert H. Vestal (R)	Fred S. Purnell (R)	William R. Wood (R)	Albert R. Hall (R)	David; Hogg (R)	Andrew J. Hickey (R)
72nd (1931–1933)	John W. Boehne Jr. (D)	Arthur H. Greenwood (D)	Eugene B. Crowe (D)	Harry C. Canfield (D)	Courtland C. Gillen (D)	William; Larrabee (D)	Louis; Ludlow (D)	Albert H. Vestal (R)	Fred S. Purnell (R)	William R. Wood (R)	Glenn; Griswold (D)	David; Hogg (R)	Samuel B. Pettengill (D)

==== 1933–1943: 12 seats ====
Congress	1st district	2nd district	3rd district	4th district	5th district	6th district	7th district	8th district	9th district	10th district	11th district	12th district
73rd (1933–1935)	William T. Schulte (D)	George R. Durgan (D)	Samuel B. Pettengill (D)	James I. Farley (D)	Glenn; Griswold (D)	Virginia E. Jenckes (D)	Arthur H. Greenwood (D)	John W. Boehne; Jr. (D)	Eugene B. Crowe (D)	Finly H. Gray (D)	William; Larrabee (D)	Louis; Ludlow (D)
74th (1935–1937)	William T. Schulte (D)	Charles; Halleck (R)	Samuel B. Pettengill (D)	James I. Farley (D)	Glenn; Griswold (D)	Virginia E. Jenckes (D)	Arthur H. Greenwood (D)	John W. Boehne; Jr. (D)	Eugene B. Crowe (D)	Finly H. Gray (D)	William; Larrabee (D)	Louis; Ludlow (D)
75th (1937–1939)	William T. Schulte (D)	Charles; Halleck (R)	Samuel B. Pettengill (D)	James I. Farley (D)	Glenn; Griswold (D)	Virginia E. Jenckes (D)	Arthur H. Greenwood (D)	John W. Boehne; Jr. (D)	Eugene B. Crowe (D)	Finly H. Gray (D)	William; Larrabee (D)	Louis; Ludlow (D)
76th (1939–1941)	William T. Schulte (D)	Charles; Halleck (R)	Robert A. Grant (R)	George W. Gillie (R)	Forest; Harness (R)	Noble J. Johnson (R)	Gerald W. Landis (R)	John W. Boehne; Jr. (D)	Eugene B. Crowe (D)	Raymond S. Springer (R)	William; Larrabee (D)	Louis; Ludlow (D)
77th (1941–1943)	William T. Schulte (D)	Charles; Halleck (R)	Robert A. Grant (R)	George W. Gillie (R)	Forest; Harness (R)	Noble J. Johnson (R)	Gerald W. Landis (R)	John W. Boehne; Jr. (D)	Earl; Wilson (R)	Raymond S. Springer (R)	William; Larrabee (D)	Louis; Ludlow (D)

==== 1943–1983: 11 seats ====
Congress	1st district	2nd district	3rd district	4th district	5th district	6th district	7th district	8th district	9th district	10th district	11th district
78th (1943–1945)	Ray; Madden (D)	Charles; Halleck (R)	Robert A. Grant (R)	George W. Gillie (R)	Forest; Harness (R)	Noble J. Johnson (R)	Gerald W. Landis (R)	Charles M. La Follette (R)	Earl; Wilson (R)	Raymond S. Springer (R)	Louis; Ludlow (D)
79th (1945–1947)	Ray; Madden (D)	Charles; Halleck (R)	Robert A. Grant (R)	George W. Gillie (R)	Forest; Harness (R)	Noble J. Johnson (R)	Gerald W. Landis (R)	Charles M. La Follette (R)	Earl; Wilson (R)	Raymond S. Springer (R)	Louis; Ludlow (D)
80th (1947–1949)	Ray; Madden (D)	Charles; Halleck (R)	Robert A. Grant (R)	George W. Gillie (R)	Forest; Harness (R)	Noble J. Johnson (R)	Gerald W. Landis (R)	E. A. Mitchell (R)	Earl; Wilson (R)	Raymond S. Springer (R)	Louis; Ludlow (D)
81st (1949–1951)	Ray; Madden (D)	Charles; Halleck (R)	Thurman C. Crook (D)	Edward H. Kruse (D)	John R. Walsh (D)	Cecil M. Harden (R)	James E. Noland (D)	Winfield K. Denton (D)	Earl; Wilson (R)	Ralph; Harvey (R)	Andrew; Jacobs Sr. (D)
82nd (1951–1953)	Ray; Madden (D)	Charles; Halleck (R)	Shepard; Crumpacker (R)	E. Ross; Adair (R)	John V. Beamer (R)	Cecil M. Harden (R)	William G. Bray (R)	Winfield K. Denton (D)	Earl; Wilson (R)	Ralph; Harvey (R)	Charles; Brownson (R)
83rd (1953–1955)	Ray; Madden (D)	Charles; Halleck (R)	Shepard; Crumpacker (R)	E. Ross; Adair (R)	John V. Beamer (R)	Cecil M. Harden (R)	William G. Bray (R)	D. Bailey; Merrill (R)	Earl; Wilson (R)	Ralph; Harvey (R)	Charles; Brownson (R)
84th (1955–1957)	Ray; Madden (D)	Charles; Halleck (R)	Shepard; Crumpacker (R)	E. Ross; Adair (R)	John V. Beamer (R)	Cecil M. Harden (R)	William G. Bray (R)	Winfield K. Denton (D)	Earl; Wilson (R)	Ralph; Harvey (R)	Charles; Brownson (R)
85th (1957–1959)	Ray; Madden (D)	Charles; Halleck (R)	F. Jay; Nimitz (R)	E. Ross; Adair (R)	John V. Beamer (R)	Cecil M. Harden (R)	William G. Bray (R)	Winfield K. Denton (D)	Earl; Wilson (R)	Ralph; Harvey (R)	Charles; Brownson (R)
86th (1959–1961)	Ray; Madden (D)	Charles; Halleck (R)	John; Brademas (D)	E. Ross; Adair (R)	J. Edward; Roush (D)	Fred; Wampler (D)	William G. Bray (R)	Winfield K. Denton (D)	Earl; Hogan (D)	Randall; Harmon (D)	Joseph W. Barr (D)
87th (1961–1963)	Ray; Madden (D)	Charles; Halleck (R)	John; Brademas (D)	E. Ross; Adair (R)	J. Edward; Roush (D)	Richard; Roudebush (R)	William G. Bray (R)	Winfield K. Denton (D)	Earl; Wilson (R)	Ralph; Harvey (R)	Donald C. Bruce (R)
88th (1963–1965)	Ray; Madden (D)	Charles; Halleck (R)	John; Brademas (D)	E. Ross; Adair (R)	J. Edward; Roush (D)	Richard; Roudebush (R)	William G. Bray (R)	Winfield K. Denton (D)	Earl; Wilson (R)	Ralph; Harvey (R)	Donald C. Bruce (R)
89th (1965–1967)	Ray; Madden (D)	Charles; Halleck (R)	John; Brademas (D)	E. Ross; Adair (R)	J. Edward; Roush (D)	Richard; Roudebush (R)	William G. Bray (R)	Winfield K. Denton (D)	Lee; Hamilton (D)	Ralph; Harvey (R)	Andrew; Jacobs; Jr. (D)
90th (1967–1969)	Ray; Madden (D)	Charles; Halleck (R)	John; Brademas (D)	E. Ross; Adair (R)	J. Edward; Roush (D)	William G. Bray (R)	John T. Myers (R)	Roger H. Zion (R)	Lee; Hamilton (D)	Richard; Roudebush (R)	Andrew; Jacobs; Jr. (D)
91st (1969–1971)	Ray; Madden (D)	Earl; Landgrebe (R)	John; Brademas (D)	E. Ross; Adair (R)	Richard; Roudebush (R)	William G. Bray (R)	John T. Myers (R)	Roger H. Zion (R)	Lee; Hamilton (D)	David W. Dennis (R)	Andrew; Jacobs; Jr. (D)
92nd (1971–1973)	Ray; Madden (D)	Earl; Landgrebe (R)	John; Brademas (D)	J. Edward; Roush (D)	Elwood; Hillis (R)	William G. Bray (R)	John T. Myers (R)	Roger H. Zion (R)	Lee; Hamilton (D)	David W. Dennis (R)	Andrew; Jacobs; Jr. (D)
93rd (1973–1975)	Ray; Madden (D)	Earl; Landgrebe (R)	John; Brademas (D)	J. Edward; Roush (D)	Elwood; Hillis (R)	William G. Bray (R)	John T. Myers (R)	Roger H. Zion (R)	Lee; Hamilton (D)	David W. Dennis (R)	William; Hudnut (R)
94th (1975–1977)	Ray; Madden (D)	Floyd; Fithian (D)	John; Brademas (D)	J. Edward; Roush (D)	Elwood; Hillis (R)	David W. Evans (D)	John T. Myers (R)	Philip H. Hayes (D)	Lee; Hamilton (D)	Philip; Sharp (D)	Andrew; Jacobs; Jr. (D)
95th (1977–1979)	Adam; Benjamin (D)	Floyd; Fithian (D)	John; Brademas (D)	Dan; Quayle (R)	Elwood; Hillis (R)	David W. Evans (D)	John T. Myers (R)	David; Cornwell (D)	Lee; Hamilton (D)	Philip; Sharp (D)	Andrew; Jacobs; Jr. (D)
96th (1979–1981)	Adam; Benjamin (D)	Floyd; Fithian (D)	John; Brademas (D)	Dan; Quayle (R)	Elwood; Hillis (R)	David W. Evans (D)	John T. Myers (R)	H. Joel; Deckard (R)	Lee; Hamilton (D)	Philip; Sharp (D)	Andrew; Jacobs; Jr. (D)
97th (1981–1983)	Adam; Benjamin (D)	Floyd; Fithian (D)	John P. Hiler (R)	Dan; Coats (R)	Elwood; Hillis (R)	David W. Evans (D)	John T. Myers (R)	H. Joel; Deckard (R)	Lee; Hamilton (D)	Philip; Sharp (D)	Andrew; Jacobs; Jr. (D)
97th (1981–1983)	Katie Hall (D)	Floyd; Fithian (D)	John P. Hiler (R)	Dan; Coats (R)	Elwood; Hillis (R)	David W. Evans (D)	John T. Myers (R)	H. Joel; Deckard (R)	Lee; Hamilton (D)	Philip; Sharp (D)	Andrew; Jacobs; Jr. (D)

==== 1983–2003: 10 seats ====
Congress	1st district	2nd district	3rd district	4th district	5th district	6th district	7th district	8th district	9th district	10th district
98th (1983–1985)	Katie Hall (D)	Philip; Sharp (D)	John P. Hiler (R)	Dan; Coats (R)	Elwood; Hillis (R)	Dan; Burton (R)	John T. Myers (R)	Frank; McCloskey (D)	Lee; Hamilton (D)	Andrew; Jacobs; Jr. (D)
99th (1985–1987)	Pete; Visclosky (D)	Philip; Sharp (D)	John P. Hiler (R)	Dan; Coats (R)	Elwood; Hillis (R)	Dan; Burton (R)	John T. Myers (R)	Frank; McCloskey (D)	Lee; Hamilton (D)	Andrew; Jacobs; Jr. (D)
100th (1987–1989)	Pete; Visclosky (D)	Philip; Sharp (D)	John P. Hiler (R)	Dan; Coats (R)	Jim; Jontz (D)	Dan; Burton (R)	John T. Myers (R)	Frank; McCloskey (D)	Lee; Hamilton (D)	Andrew; Jacobs; Jr. (D)
101st (1989–1991)	Pete; Visclosky (D)	Philip; Sharp (D)	John P. Hiler (R)	Jill Long; Thompson (D)	Jim; Jontz (D)	Dan; Burton (R)	John T. Myers (R)	Frank; McCloskey (D)	Lee; Hamilton (D)	Andrew; Jacobs; Jr. (D)
102nd (1991–1993)	Pete; Visclosky (D)	Philip; Sharp (D)	Tim; Roemer (D)	Jill Long; Thompson (D)	Jim; Jontz (D)	Dan; Burton (R)	John T. Myers (R)	Frank; McCloskey (D)	Lee; Hamilton (D)	Andrew; Jacobs; Jr. (D)
103rd (1993–1995)	Pete; Visclosky (D)	Philip; Sharp (D)	Tim; Roemer (D)	Jill Long; Thompson (D)	Steve; Buyer (R)	Dan; Burton (R)	John T. Myers (R)	Frank; McCloskey (D)	Lee; Hamilton (D)	Andrew; Jacobs; Jr. (D)
104th (1995–1997)	Pete; Visclosky (D)	David; McIntosh (R)	Tim; Roemer (D)	Mark; Souder (R)	Steve; Buyer (R)	Dan; Burton (R)	John T. Myers (R)	John; Hostettler (R)	Lee; Hamilton (D)	Andrew; Jacobs; Jr. (D)
105th (1997–1999)	Pete; Visclosky (D)	David; McIntosh (R)	Tim; Roemer (D)	Mark; Souder (R)	Steve; Buyer (R)	Dan; Burton (R)	Ed; Pease (R)	John; Hostettler (R)	Lee; Hamilton (D)	Julia; Carson (D)
106th (1999–2001)	Pete; Visclosky (D)	David; McIntosh (R)	Tim; Roemer (D)	Mark; Souder (R)	Steve; Buyer (R)	Dan; Burton (R)	Ed; Pease (R)	John; Hostettler (R)	Baron; Hill (D)	Julia; Carson (D)
107th (2001–2003)	Pete; Visclosky (D)	Mike Pence (R)	Tim; Roemer (D)	Mark; Souder (R)	Steve; Buyer (R)	Dan; Burton (R)	Brian Kerns (R)	John; Hostettler (R)	Baron; Hill (D)	Julia; Carson (D)

==== 2003–present: 9 seats ====
Congress	1st district	2nd district	3rd district	4th district	5th district	6th district	7th district	8th district	9th district
108th (2003–2005)	Pete; Visclosky (D)	Chris; Chocola (R)	Mark; Souder (R)	Steve; Buyer (R)	Dan Burton (R)	Mike; Pence (R)	Julia; Carson (D)	John; Hostettler (R)	Baron Hill (D)
109th (2005–2007)	Pete; Visclosky (D)	Chris; Chocola (R)	Mark; Souder (R)	Steve; Buyer (R)	Dan Burton (R)	Mike; Pence (R)	Julia; Carson (D)	John; Hostettler (R)	Mike Sodrel (R)
110th (2007–2009)	Pete; Visclosky (D)	Joe; Donnelly (D)	Mark; Souder (R)	Steve; Buyer (R)	Dan Burton (R)	Mike; Pence (R)	Julia; Carson (D)	Brad; Ellsworth (D)	Baron Hill (D)
110th (2007–2009)	Pete; Visclosky (D)	Joe; Donnelly (D)	Mark; Souder (R)	Steve; Buyer (R)	Dan Burton (R)	Mike; Pence (R)	André; Carson (D)	Brad; Ellsworth (D)	Baron Hill (D)
111th (2009–2011)	Pete; Visclosky (D)	Joe; Donnelly (D)	Mark; Souder (R)	Steve; Buyer (R)	Dan Burton (R)	Mike; Pence (R)	André; Carson (D)	Brad; Ellsworth (D)	Baron Hill (D)
112th (2011–2013)	Pete; Visclosky (D)	Joe; Donnelly (D)	Marlin; Stutzman (R)	Todd; Rokita (R)	Dan Burton (R)	Mike; Pence (R)	André; Carson (D)	Larry; Bucshon (R)	Todd; Young (R)
113th (2013–2015)	Pete; Visclosky (D)	Jackie; Walorski (R)	Marlin; Stutzman (R)	Todd; Rokita (R)	Susan Brooks (R)	Luke; Messer (R)	André; Carson (D)	Larry; Bucshon (R)	Todd; Young (R)
114th (2015–2017)	Pete; Visclosky (D)	Jackie; Walorski (R)	Marlin; Stutzman (R)	Todd; Rokita (R)	Susan Brooks (R)	Luke; Messer (R)	André; Carson (D)	Larry; Bucshon (R)	Todd; Young (R)
115th (2017–2019)	Pete; Visclosky (D)	Jackie; Walorski (R)	Jim Banks (R)	Todd; Rokita (R)	Susan Brooks (R)	Luke; Messer (R)	André; Carson (D)	Larry; Bucshon (R)	Trey; Hollingsworth (R)
116th (2019–2021)	Pete; Visclosky (D)	Jackie; Walorski (R)	Jim Banks (R)	Jim Baird (R)	Susan Brooks (R)	Greg; Pence (R)	André; Carson (D)	Larry; Bucshon (R)	Trey; Hollingsworth (R)
117th (2021–2023)	Frank Mrvan (D)	Jackie; Walorski (R)	Jim Banks (R)	Jim Baird (R)	Victoria Spartz (R)	Greg; Pence (R)	André; Carson (D)	Larry; Bucshon (R)	Trey; Hollingsworth (R)
117th (2021–2023)	Frank Mrvan (D)	Rudy Yakym (R)	Jim Banks (R)	Jim Baird (R)	Victoria Spartz (R)	Greg; Pence (R)	André; Carson (D)	Larry; Bucshon (R)	Trey; Hollingsworth (R)
118th (2023–2025)	Frank Mrvan (D)	Rudy Yakym (R)	Jim Banks (R)	Jim Baird (R)	Victoria Spartz (R)	Greg; Pence (R)	André; Carson (D)	Larry; Bucshon (R)	Erin Houchin (R)
119th (2025–2027)	Frank Mrvan (D)	Rudy Yakym (R)	Marlin; Stutzman (R)	Jim Baird (R)	Victoria Spartz (R)	Jefferson; Shreve (R)	André; Carson (D)	Mark; Messmer (R)	Erin Houchin (R)
120th (2027–2029)	Frank Mrvan (D)	Rudy Yakym (R)	Marlin; Stutzman (R)	Jim Baird (R)	J.D. Ford (D)	Jefferson; Shreve (R)	André; Carson (D)	Mark; Messmer (R)	Erin Houchin (R)
Congress	1st district	2nd district	3rd district	4th district	5th district	6th district	7th district	8th district	9th district

== U.S. Senate ==
Current U.S. senators from Indiana
Indiana CPVI (2025): R+9	Class I senator	Class III senator
Indiana CPVI (2025): R+9	Jim Banks (junior senator) (Columbia City)	Todd Young (senior senator) (Bargersville)
Party	Republican	Republican
Incumbent since	January 3, 2025	January 3, 2017

Each state elects two senators by statewide popular vote every six years. The terms of the two senators are staggered so that they are not elected in the same year. Indiana's senators are elected in the years from classes 1 and 3. Senators were originally chosen by the Indiana General Assembly until the Seventeenth Amendment came into force in 1913.

Of the forty-six men who have been senators from Indiana, there have been three Democratic-Republicans, three Adams Republicans (including James Noble, who was both a Democratic-Republican and Adams Republican), two Whigs, one Unionist, twenty-one Democrats, and seventeen Republicans.

Democratic (D) Democratic-Republican (DR) Jacksonian (J) National Republican (NR) Republican (R) Union (U) Whig (W)

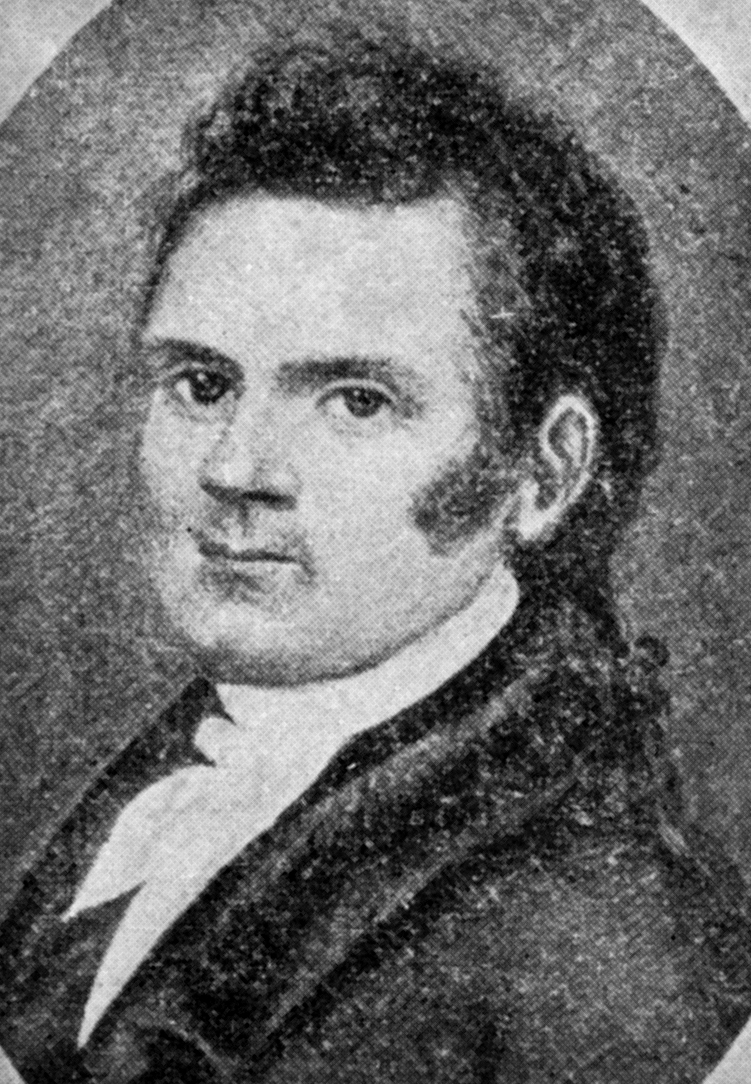
James Noble, Indiana's first senator

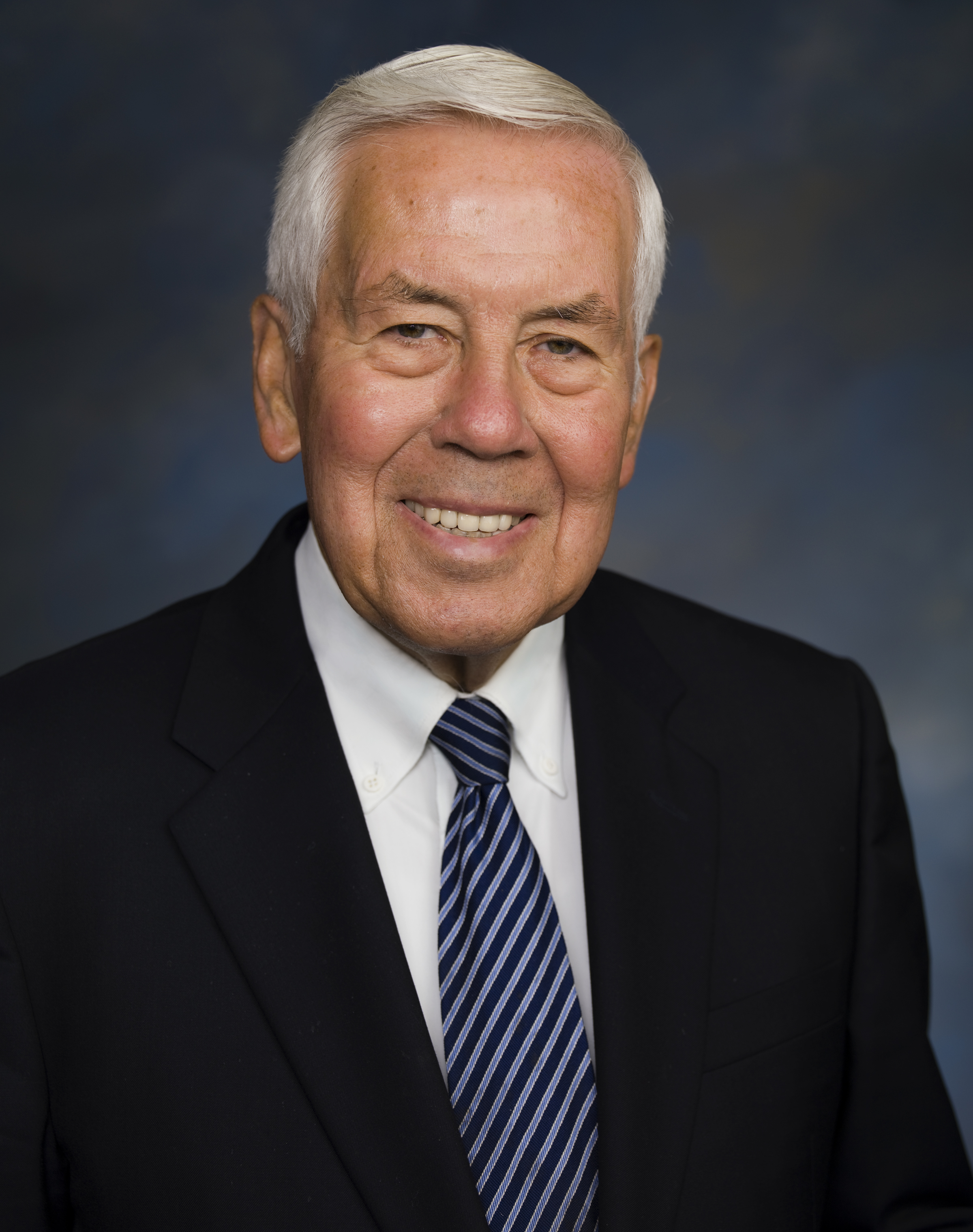
Richard Lugar, the longest-serving senator from Indiana, served from 1977 to 2013.

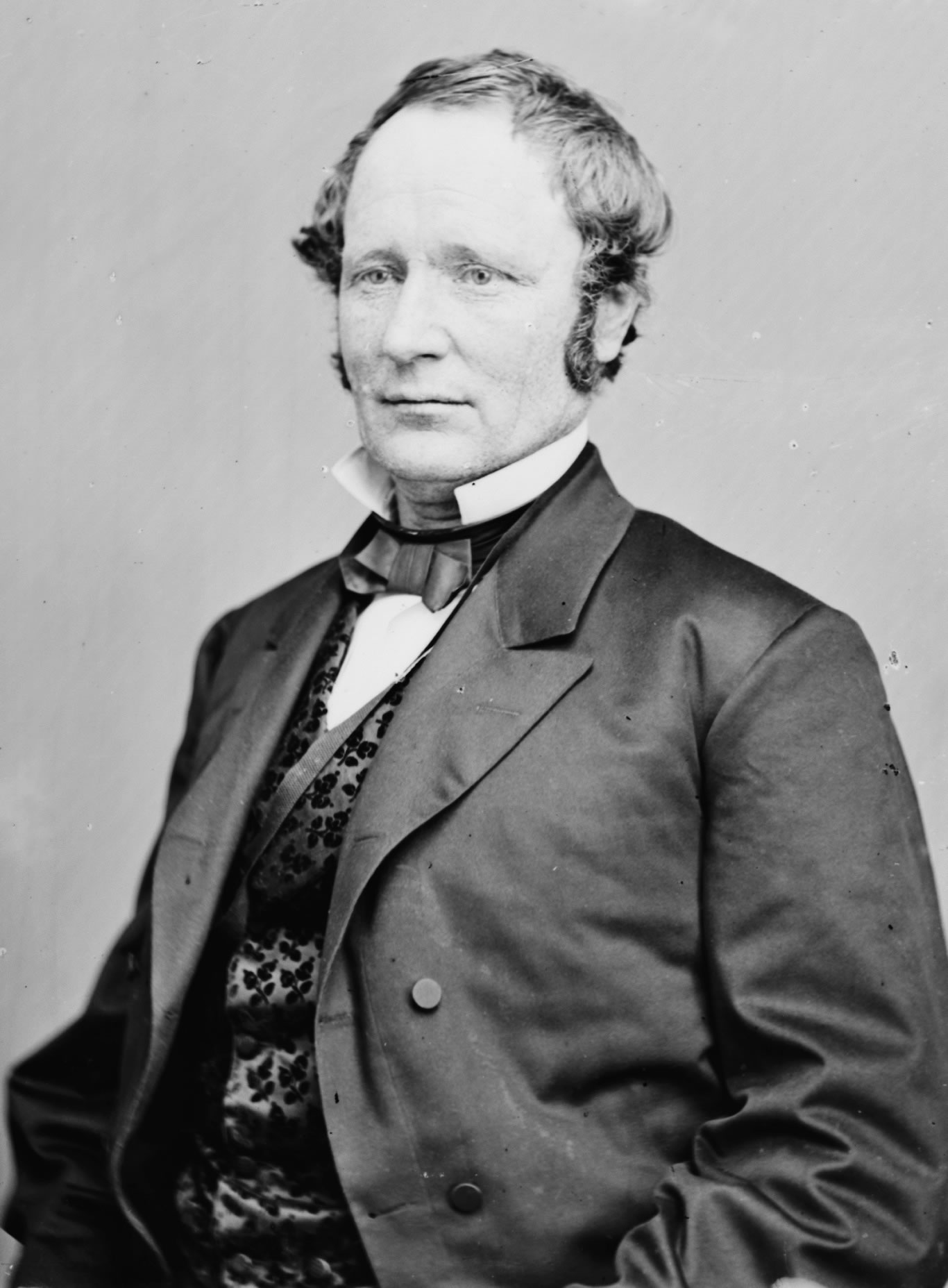
Thomas A. Hendricks, two-term Representative, one-term senator, and President of the Senate (Vice President), as well as Governor of Indiana

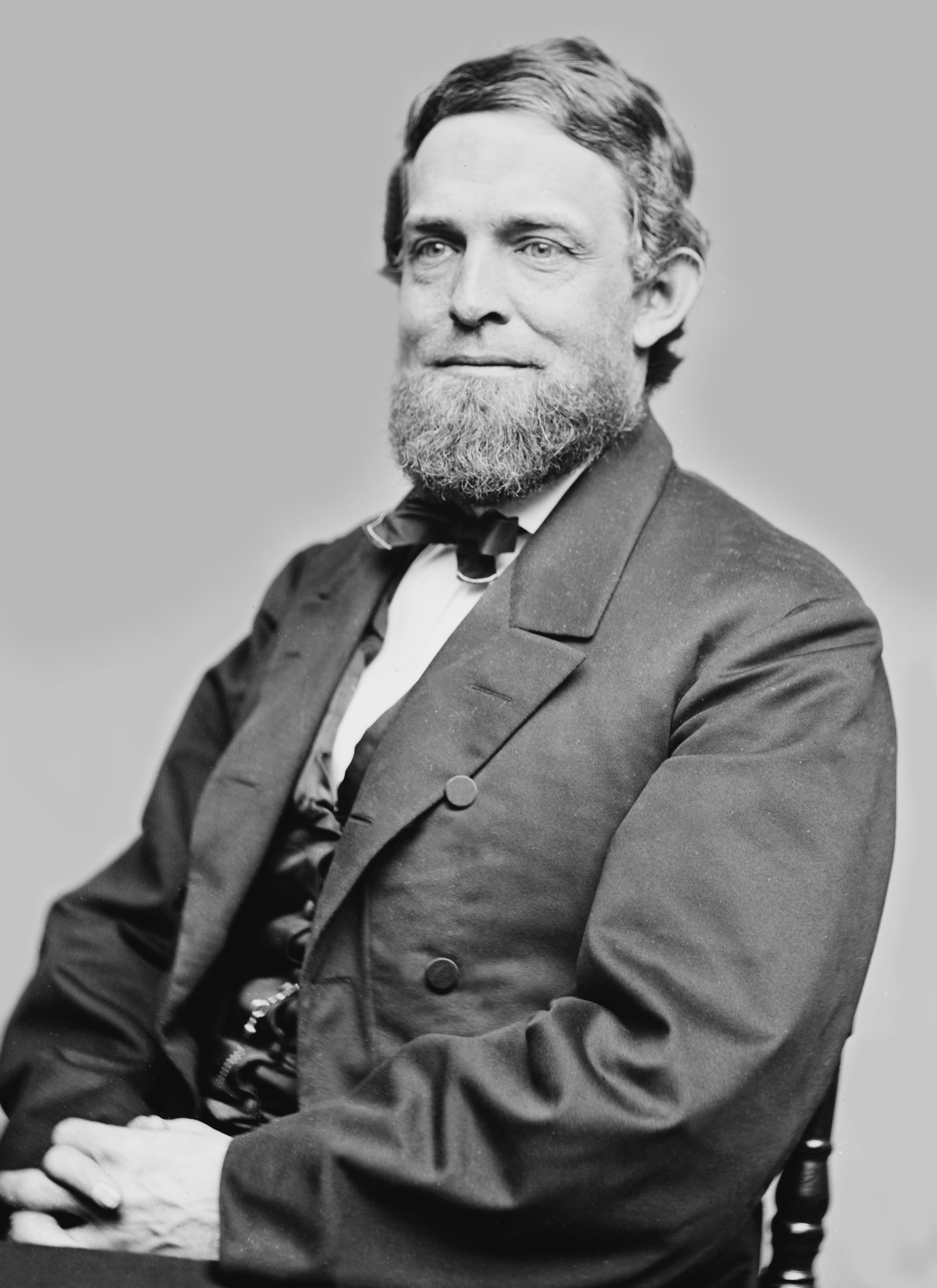
Schuyler Colfax, seven-term Representative and Speaker of the House and later President of the Senate (Vice President)

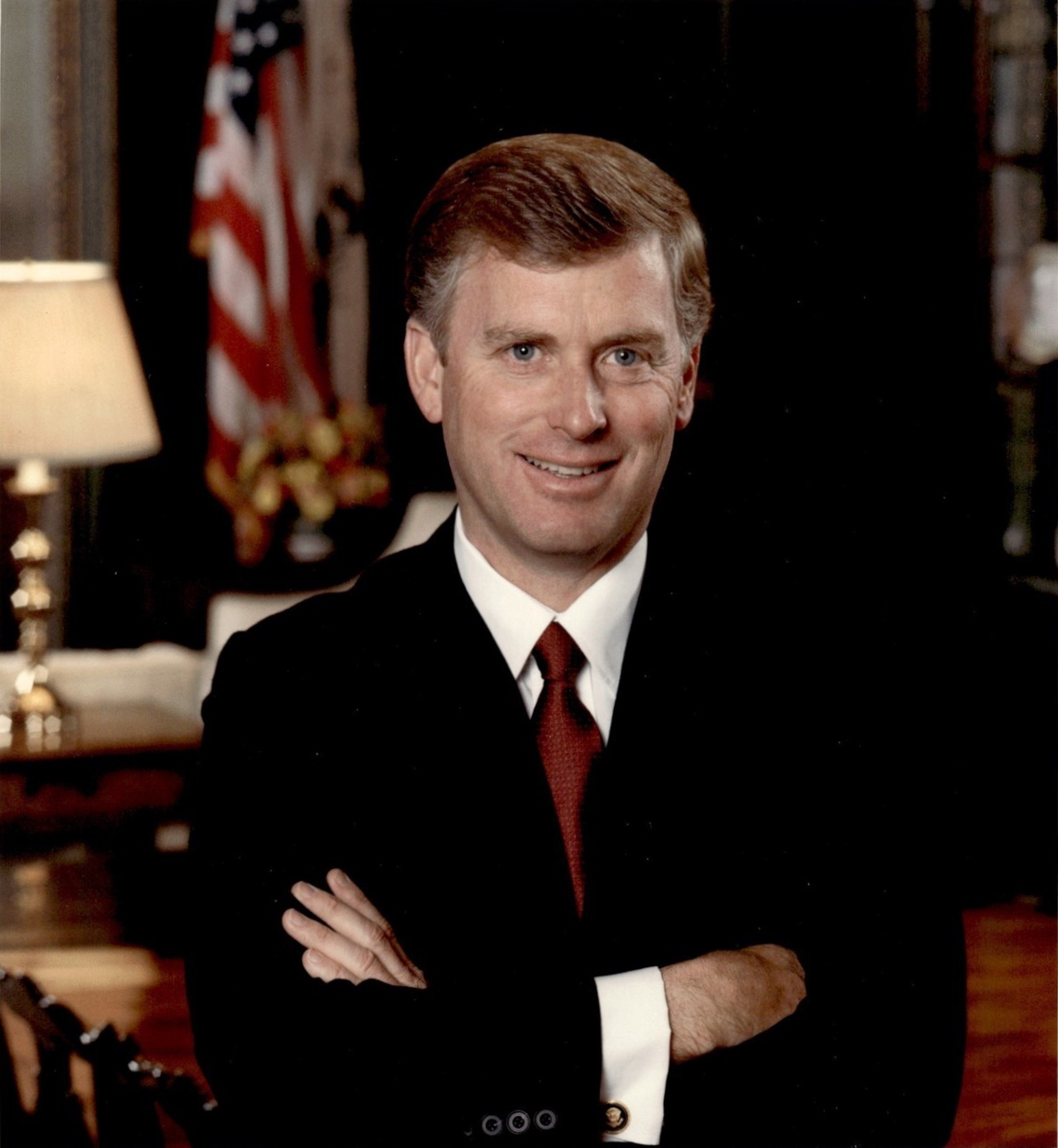
Dan Quayle, two-term representative, one-term senator, and President of the Senate (Vice President)

Class I senator	Congress	Class III senator
James Noble (DR)	14th (1815–1817)	Waller Taylor (DR)
James Noble (DR)	15th (1817–1819)	Waller Taylor (DR)
James Noble (DR)	16th (1819–1821)	Waller Taylor (DR)
James Noble (DR)	17th (1821–1823)	Waller Taylor (DR)
James Noble (DR)	18th (1823–1825)	Waller Taylor (DR)
James Noble (NR) (Note: Died.)	19th (1825–1827)	William Hendricks (NR)
James Noble (NR)	20th (1827–1829)	William Hendricks (NR)
James Noble (NR)	21st (1829–1831)	William Hendricks (NR)
Robert Hanna (NR) (Note: Upon the death of senator Noble, Hanna was appointed to serve until an election could be held. He served from August 19, 1831, to January 3, 1832.)	22nd (1831–1833)	William Hendricks (NR)
John Tipton (J) (Note: Elected to fill senator's Noble term in a special election. He started to serve on December 9, 1831, and was then subsequently elected to a full term.)	23rd (1833–1835)	William Hendricks (NR)
John Tipton (J)	24th (1835–1837)	William Hendricks (NR)
John Tipton (D)	25th (1837–1839)	Oliver H. Smith (W)
Albert Smith White (W)	26th (1839–1841)	Oliver H. Smith (W)
Albert Smith White (W)	27th (1841–1843)	Oliver H. Smith (W)
Albert Smith White (W)	28th (1843–1845)	Edward A. Hannegan (D)
Jesse D. Bright (D) (Note: Expelled from the Senate for supporting the Confederacy.)	29th (1845–1847)	Edward A. Hannegan (D)
Jesse D. Bright (D)	30th (1847–1849)	Edward A. Hannegan (D)
Jesse D. Bright (D)	31st (1849–1851)	James Whitcomb (D)
Jesse D. Bright (D)	32nd (1851–1853)	James Whitcomb (D)
Jesse D. Bright (D)	32nd (1851–1853)	Charles W. Cathcart (D) (Note: Upon the death of senator Whitcomb, Catcart was appointed to serve until an election could be held. Cartcart served from December 6, 1852, to January 18, 1853.)
Jesse D. Bright (D)	32nd (1851–1853)	John Pettit (D) (Note: Elected to serve the remainder of senator Whitcomb's term. Pettit served from January 18, 1853, to March 3, 1855.)
Jesse D. Bright (D)	33rd (1853–1855)	John Pettit (D)
Jesse D. Bright (D)	34th (1855–1857)	Graham N. Fitch (D)
Jesse D. Bright (D)	35th (1857–1859)	Graham N. Fitch (D)
Jesse D. Bright (D)	36th (1859–1861)	Graham N. Fitch (D)
Joseph A. Wright (U) (Note: Upon the expulsion of senator Bright, Wright was appointed to fill the vacancy until an election could be held and served from February 24, 1862, to January 14, 1863.)	37th (1861–1863)	Henry S. Lane (R)
David Turpie (D) (Note: Elected to fill the vacancy caused by the expulsion of senator Bright and served from January 14 to March 3, 1863.)	37th (1861–1863)	Henry S. Lane (R)
Thomas A. Hendricks (D)	38th (1863–1865)	Henry S. Lane (R)
Thomas A. Hendricks (D)	39th (1865–1867)	Henry S. Lane (R)
Thomas A. Hendricks (D)	40th (1867–1869)	Oliver P. Morton (R)
Daniel D. Pratt (R)	41st (1869–1871)	Oliver P. Morton (R)
Daniel D. Pratt (R)	42nd (1871–1873)	Oliver P. Morton (R)
Daniel D. Pratt (R)	43rd (1873–1875)	Oliver P. Morton (R)
Joseph E. McDonald (D)	44th (1875–1877)	Oliver P. Morton (R)
Joseph E. McDonald (D)	45th (1877–1879)	Oliver P. Morton (R)
Joseph E. McDonald (D)	45th (1877–1879)	Daniel W. Voorhees (D) (Note: Upon the death of senator Morton, Voorhees was appointed to fill the vacancy until an election could be held. He was subsequently elected to fill the rest of the term.)
Joseph E. McDonald (D)	46th (1879–1881)	Daniel W. Voorhees (D)
Benjamin Harrison (R)	47th (1881–1883)	Daniel W. Voorhees (D)
Benjamin Harrison (R)	48th (1883–1885)	Daniel W. Voorhees (D)
Benjamin Harrison (R)	49th (1885–1887)	Daniel W. Voorhees (D)
David Turpie (D)	50th (1887–1889)	Daniel W. Voorhees (D)
David Turpie (D)	51st (1889–1891)	Daniel W. Voorhees (D)
David Turpie (D)	52nd (1891–1893)	Daniel W. Voorhees (D)
David Turpie (D)	53rd (1893–1895)	Daniel W. Voorhees (D)
David Turpie (D)	54th (1895–1897)	Daniel W. Voorhees (D)
David Turpie (D)	55th (1897–1899)	Charles W. Fairbanks (R)
Albert J. Beveridge (R)	56th (1899–1901)	Charles W. Fairbanks (R)
Albert J. Beveridge (R)	57th (1901–1903)	Charles W. Fairbanks (R)
Albert J. Beveridge (R)	58th (1903–1905)	Charles W. Fairbanks (R)
Albert J. Beveridge (R)	59th (1905–1907)	James A. Hemenway (R)
Albert J. Beveridge (R)	60th (1907–1909)	James A. Hemenway (R)
Albert J. Beveridge (R)	61st (1909–1911)	Benjamin F. Shively (D)
John W. Kern (D)	62nd (1911–1913)	Benjamin F. Shively (D)
John W. Kern (D)	63rd (1913–1915)	Benjamin F. Shively (D)
John W. Kern (D)	64th (1915–1917)	Benjamin F. Shively (D)
John W. Kern (D)	64th (1915–1917)	Thomas Taggart (D) (Note: Upon the death of senator Shively, Taggert was appointed to fill the vacancy until an election could be held and served from March 20 to November 7, 1916. He subsequently lost the election for Shively's seat.)
John W. Kern (D)	64th (1915–1917)	James E. Watson (R) (Note: Won the election to fill the remainder of senator Shively's term. He started to serve on November 8, 1916.)
Harry S. New (R)	65th (1917–1919)	James E. Watson (R)
Harry S. New (R)	66th (1919–1921)	James E. Watson (R)
Harry S. New (R)	67th (1921–1923)	James E. Watson (R)
Samuel M. Ralston (D)	68th (1923–1925)	James E. Watson (R)
Samuel M. Ralston (D)	69th (1925–1927)	James E. Watson (R)
Arthur Raymond; Robinson (R) (Note: Upon the death of senator Ralston, Robinson was appointed on October 20, 1925, to serve until an election could be held and subsequently won the election.)	69th (1925–1927)	James E. Watson (R)
Arthur Raymond; Robinson (R)	70th (1927–1929)	James E. Watson (R)
Arthur Raymond; Robinson (R)	71st (1929–1931)	James E. Watson (R)
Arthur Raymond; Robinson (R)	72nd (1931–1933)	James E. Watson (R)
Arthur Raymond; Robinson (R)	73rd (1933–1935)	Frederick Van Nuys (D)
Sherman Minton (D)	74th (1935–1937)	Frederick Van Nuys (D)
Sherman Minton (D)	75th (1937–1939)	Frederick Van Nuys (D)
Sherman Minton (D)	76th (1939–1941)	Frederick Van Nuys (D)
Raymond E. Willis (R)	77th (1941–1943)	Frederick Van Nuys (D)
Raymond E. Willis (R)	78th (1943–1945)	Samuel D. Jackson (D) (Note: Upon the death of senator Van Nuys, Jackson was appointed to fill the vacancy until an election could be held and served from January 28 to November 13, 1944.)
Raymond E. Willis (R)	78th (1943–1945)	William E. Jenner (R) (Note: Jenner won the election to fill the vacancy left by senator Jackson's death. He started to serve on November 14, 1944.)
Raymond E. Willis (R)	79th (1945–1947)	Homer E. Capehart (R)
William E. Jenner (R)	80th (1947–1949)	Homer E. Capehart (R)
William E. Jenner (R)	81st (1949–1951)	Homer E. Capehart (R)
William E. Jenner (R)	82nd (1951–1953)	Homer E. Capehart (R)
William E. Jenner (R)	83rd (1953–1955)	Homer E. Capehart (R)
William E. Jenner (R)	84th (1955–1957)	Homer E. Capehart (R)
William E. Jenner (R)	85th (1957–1959)	Homer E. Capehart (R)
Vance Hartke (D)	86th (1959–1961)	Homer E. Capehart (R)
Vance Hartke (D)	87th (1961–1963)	Homer E. Capehart (R)
Vance Hartke (D)	88th (1963–1965)	Birch Bayh (D)
Vance Hartke (D)	89th (1965–1967)	Birch Bayh (D)
Vance Hartke (D)	90th (1967–1969)	Birch Bayh (D)
Vance Hartke (D)	91st (1969–1971)	Birch Bayh (D)
Vance Hartke (D)	92nd (1971–1973)	Birch Bayh (D)
Vance Hartke (D)	93rd (1973–1975)	Birch Bayh (D)
Vance Hartke (D)	94th (1975–1977)	Birch Bayh (D)
Richard Lugar (R)	95th (1977–1979)	Birch Bayh (D)
Richard Lugar (R)	96th (1979–1981)	Birch Bayh (D)
Richard Lugar (R)	97th (1981–1983)	Dan Quayle (R) (Note: Resigned on January 3, 1989, to become the Vice President of the United States.)
Richard Lugar (R)	98th (1983–1985)	Dan Quayle (R)
Richard Lugar (R)	99th (1985–1987)	Dan Quayle (R)
Richard Lugar (R)	100th (1987–1989)	Dan Quayle (R)
Richard Lugar (R)	100th (1987–1989)	Dan Coats (R) (Note: Upon the resignation of senator Quayle, Coats was appointed on December 12, 1988, to serve until an election could be held and subsequently won the election.)
Richard Lugar (R)	101st (1989–1991)	Dan Coats (R)
Richard Lugar (R)	102nd (1991–1993)	Dan Coats (R)
Richard Lugar (R)	103rd (1993–1995)	Dan Coats (R)
Richard Lugar (R)	104th (1995–1997)	Dan Coats (R)
Richard Lugar (R)	105th (1997–1999)	Dan Coats (R)
Richard Lugar (R)	106th (1999–2001)	Evan Bayh (D)
Richard Lugar (R)	107th (2001–2003)	Evan Bayh (D)
Richard Lugar (R)	108th (2003–2005)	Evan Bayh (D)
Richard Lugar (R)	109th (2005–2007)	Evan Bayh (D)
Richard Lugar (R)	110th (2007–2009)	Evan Bayh (D)
Richard Lugar (R)	111th (2009–2011)	Evan Bayh (D)
Richard Lugar (R)	112th (2011–2013)	Dan Coats (R)
Joe Donnelly (D)	113th (2013–2015)	Dan Coats (R)
Joe Donnelly (D)	114th (2015–2017)	Dan Coats (R)
Joe Donnelly (D)	115th (2017–2019)	Todd Young (R)
Mike Braun (R)	116th (2019–2021)	Todd Young (R)
Mike Braun (R)	117th (2021–2023)	Todd Young (R)
Mike Braun (R)	118th (2023–2025)	Todd Young (R)
Jim Banks (R)	119th (2025–2027)	Todd Young (R)
Jim Banks (R)	120th (2027–2029)	Todd Young (R)

== See also ==
- List of United States congressional districts
- Indiana's congressional districts
- Political party strength in Indiana
