= Andrew H. Hamilton =

American politician

Andrew Hamilton
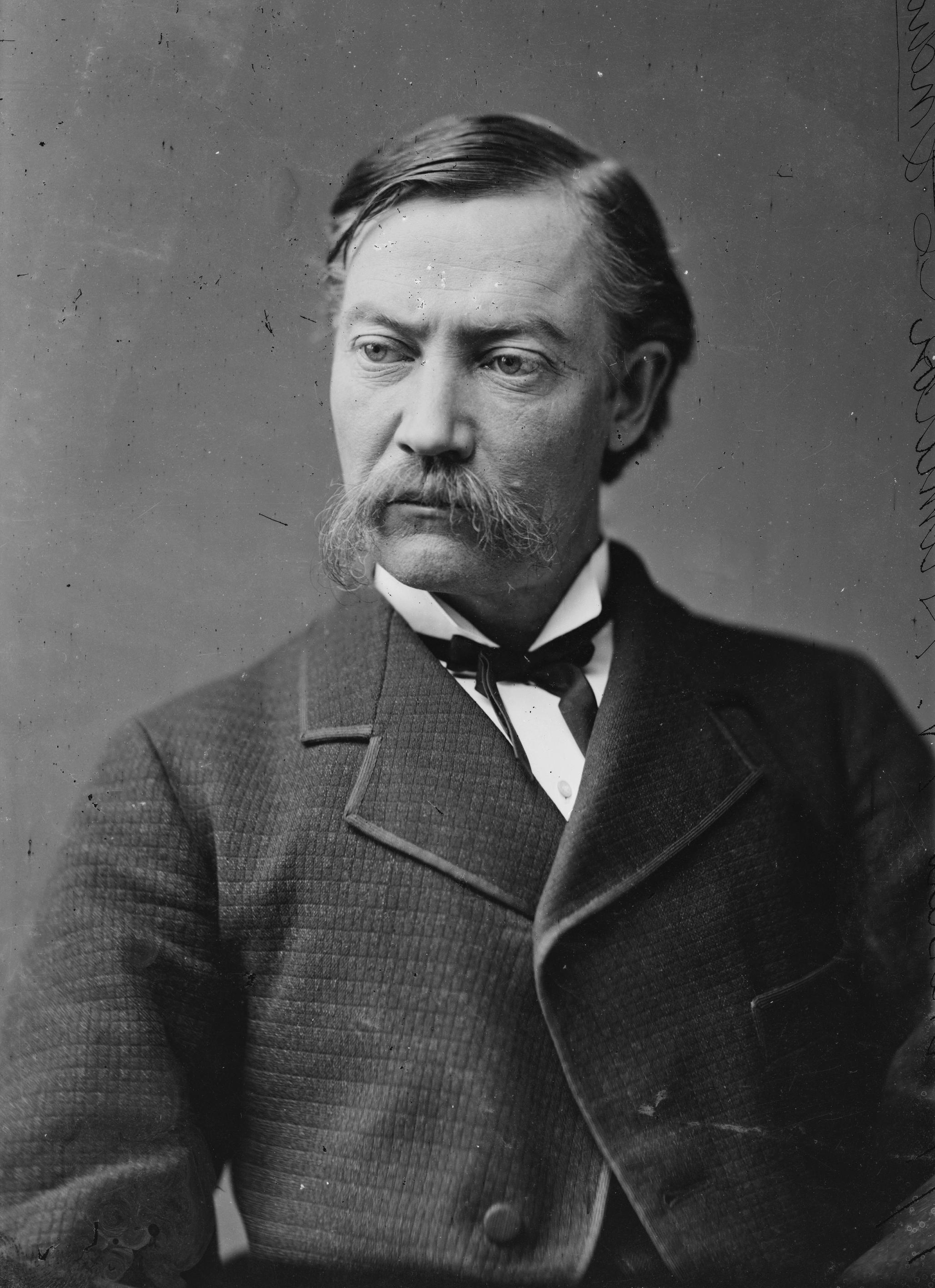

Member of the U.S. House of Representatives from Indiana's 12th district
- In office March 4, 1875 – March 3, 1879
- Preceded by: District established
- Succeeded by: Walpole G. Colerick

Personal details
- Born: Andrew Holman Hamilton; June 7, 1834 Fort Wayne, Indiana, U.S.
- Died: May 9, 1895 (aged 60) Fort Wayne, Indiana, U.S
- Resting place: Lindenwood Cemetery
- Party: Democratic
- Education: Wabash College; Harvard University

Andrew Holman Hamilton (June 7, 1834 – May 9, 1895) was an American lawyer and politician who served two terms as a politician from Indiana who served in the United States House of Representatives from 1875 to 1879.

== Early life and career ==
He was born in Fort Wayne, Indiana, June 7, 1834, the oldest son of Allen Hamilton, an Irish immigrant and local banker. Hamilton attended the common schools and graduated from Wabash College in Crawfordsville in 1854. Hamilton studied law at Harvard University. After being admitted to the bar in 1859, he began to practice law in Fort Wayne.

=== Personal life ===
Hamilton married Phoebe Taber in 1851. The couple had five children.

He is the uncle of Edith Hamilton and Alice Hamilton.

== Political career ==
He was elected as a Democrat to the Forty-fourth and Forty-fifth Congresses (March 4, 1875 – March 3, 1879). After his term in the House, he resumed the practice of law.

== Death ==
Hamilton died in Fort Wayne on May 9, 1895. He is interred in Lindenwood Cemetery.

U.S. House of Representatives
Preceded by District created	Member of the U.S. House of Representatives from Indiana's 12th congressional district March 4, 1875 – March 3, 1879	Succeeded by Walpole G. Colerick
