= Cyrus Cline =

American politician

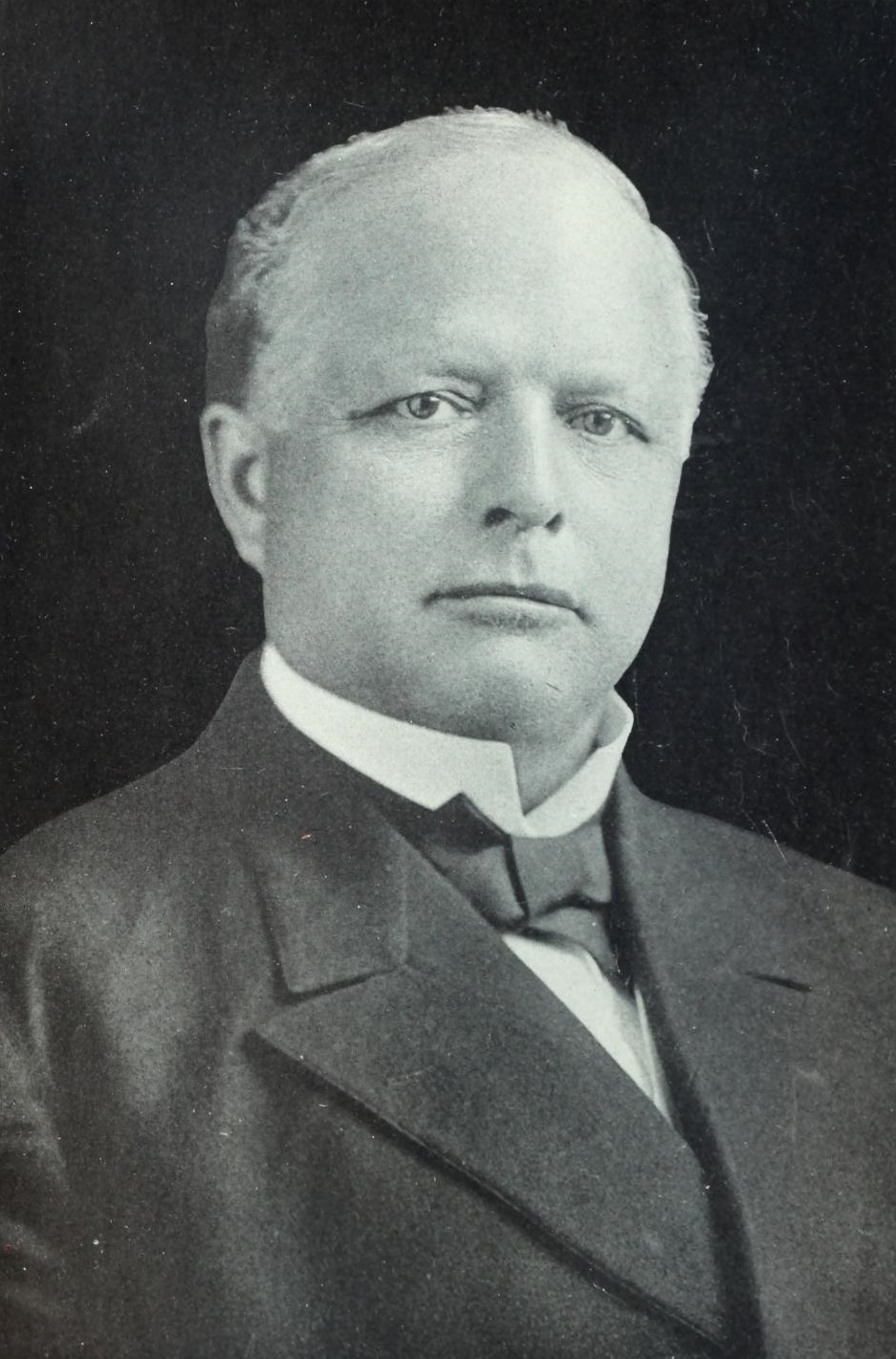

Member of the U.S. House of Representatives from Indiana's 12th district
- In office March 4, 1909 – March 3, 1917
- Preceded by: Clarence C. Gilhams
- Succeeded by: Louis W. Fairfield

Personal details
- Born: July 12, 1856 near Mansfield, Ohio, U.S.
- Died: October 5, 1923 (aged 67) Angola, Indiana, U.S.
- Resting place: Circle Hill Cemetery, Angola, Indiana
- Party: Democratic
- Education: Hillsdale College

Cyrus Cline (July 12, 1856 – October 5, 1923) was an American lawyer and politician who served four terms as a U.S. representative from Indiana from 1909 to 1917.

== Career overview ==
Born near Mansfield, Ohio, Cline moved to Steuben County, Indiana, in 1858 with his parents, who settled near Angola. He attended the Angola High School, and was graduated from Hillsdale College, Michigan, in 1876. Cline was the superintendent of the schools of Steuben County between 1877 and 1883. He studied law, was admitted to the bar and began practice in Angola, Indiana, in 1884.

=== Congress ===
Cline was elected as a Democrat to the Sixty-first and to the three succeeding Congresses, serving from March 4, 1909, to March 3, 1917. He served as chairman of the Committee on Expenditures on Public Buildings during the Sixty-second Congress, from 1909 to 1911. He was an unsuccessful candidate for reelection in 1916.

=== Later career and death ===
After leaving office, he resumed the practice of law in Angola, where he died.

He was interred in Circle Hill Cemetery.

U.S. House of Representatives
Preceded by Clarence C. Gilhams	Member of the U.S. House of Representatives from Indiana's 12th congressional district 1909-1917	Succeeded by Louis W. Fairfield
