= Clarence C. Gilhams =

American politician (1860–1912)

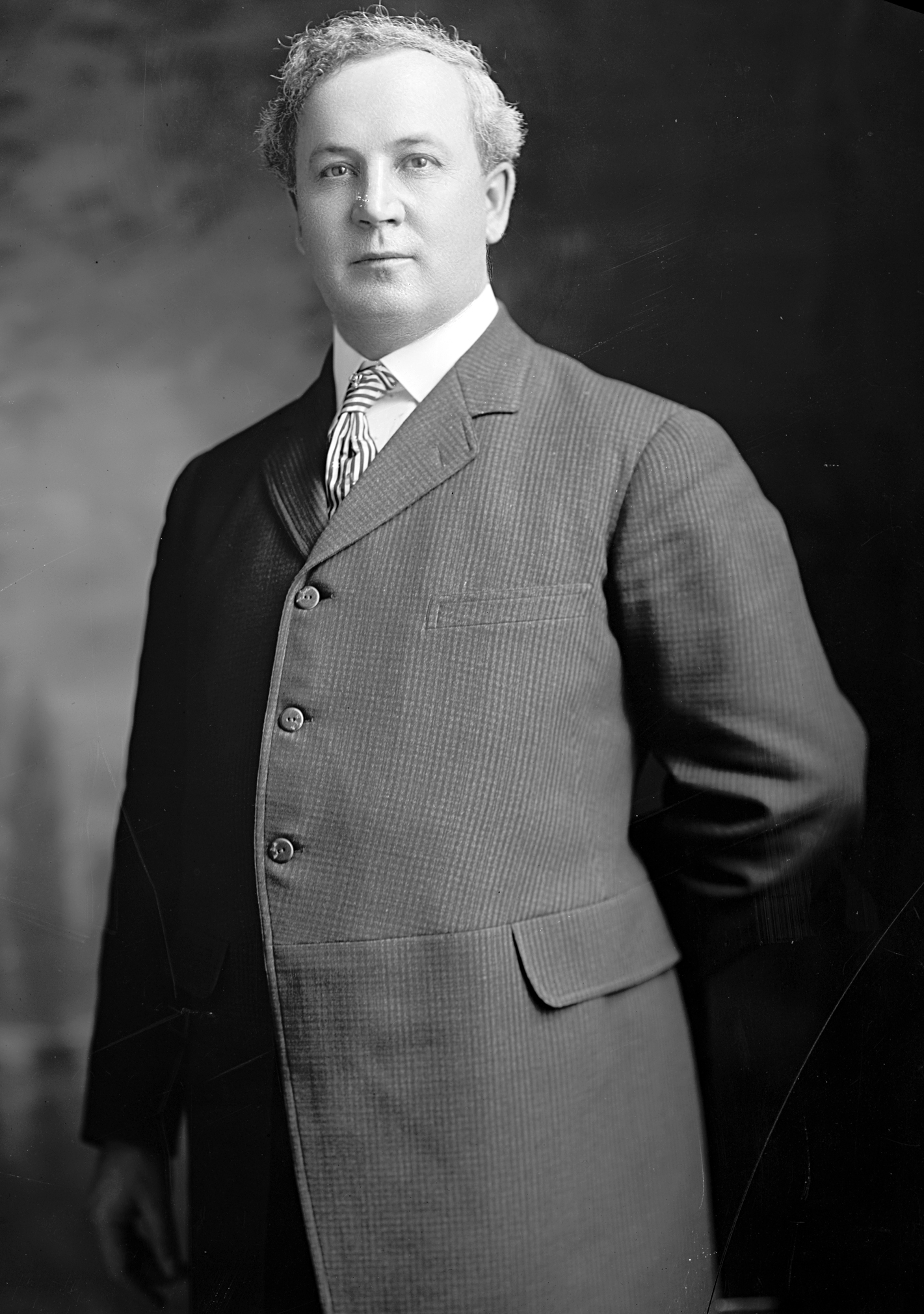

Member of the U.S. House of Representatives from Indiana's 12th district
- In office November 6, 1906 – March 3, 1909
- Preceded by: Newton W. Gilbert
- Succeeded by: Cyrus Cline

Personal details
- Born: April 11, 1860 Brighton, Indiana, U.S.
- Died: June 5, 1912 (aged 52) Lagrange, Indiana, U.S.
- Resting place: Greenwood Cemetery, Lagrange, Indiana
- Party: Republican
- Education: Indiana State University

Clarence Chauncey Gilhams (April 11, 1860 – June 5, 1912) was an American educator and politician who served two terms as a U.S. representative from Indiana from 1906 to 1909.

== Biography ==
Born in Brighton, Indiana, Gilhams attended the common local schools and Indiana State University at Terre Haute, Indiana and became a school teacher. He was employed as a salesman. An auditor of Lagrange County in 1894–1902, he later engaged in the life insurance business.

=== Congress ===
Gilhams was elected as a Republican, in 1906, to the Fifty-ninth Congress to fill the vacancy caused by the resignation of Newton W. Gilbert; he was reelected to the Sixtieth Congress and served from November 6, 1906, to March 3, 1909. He was an unsuccessful candidate for reelection in 1908 to the Sixty-first Congress.

=== Later career and death ===
Later, he studied law, and was admitted to the bar in 1910, also resuming the life insurance business.

He died in Lagrange, Indiana, on June 5, 1912. He was interred in Greenwood Cemetery.

U.S. House of Representatives
Preceded by Newton W. Gilbert	Member of the U.S. House of Representatives from Indiana's 12th congressional district November 6, 1906 – March 3, 1909	Succeeded by Cyrus Cline
