= Louis W. Fairfield =

American politician

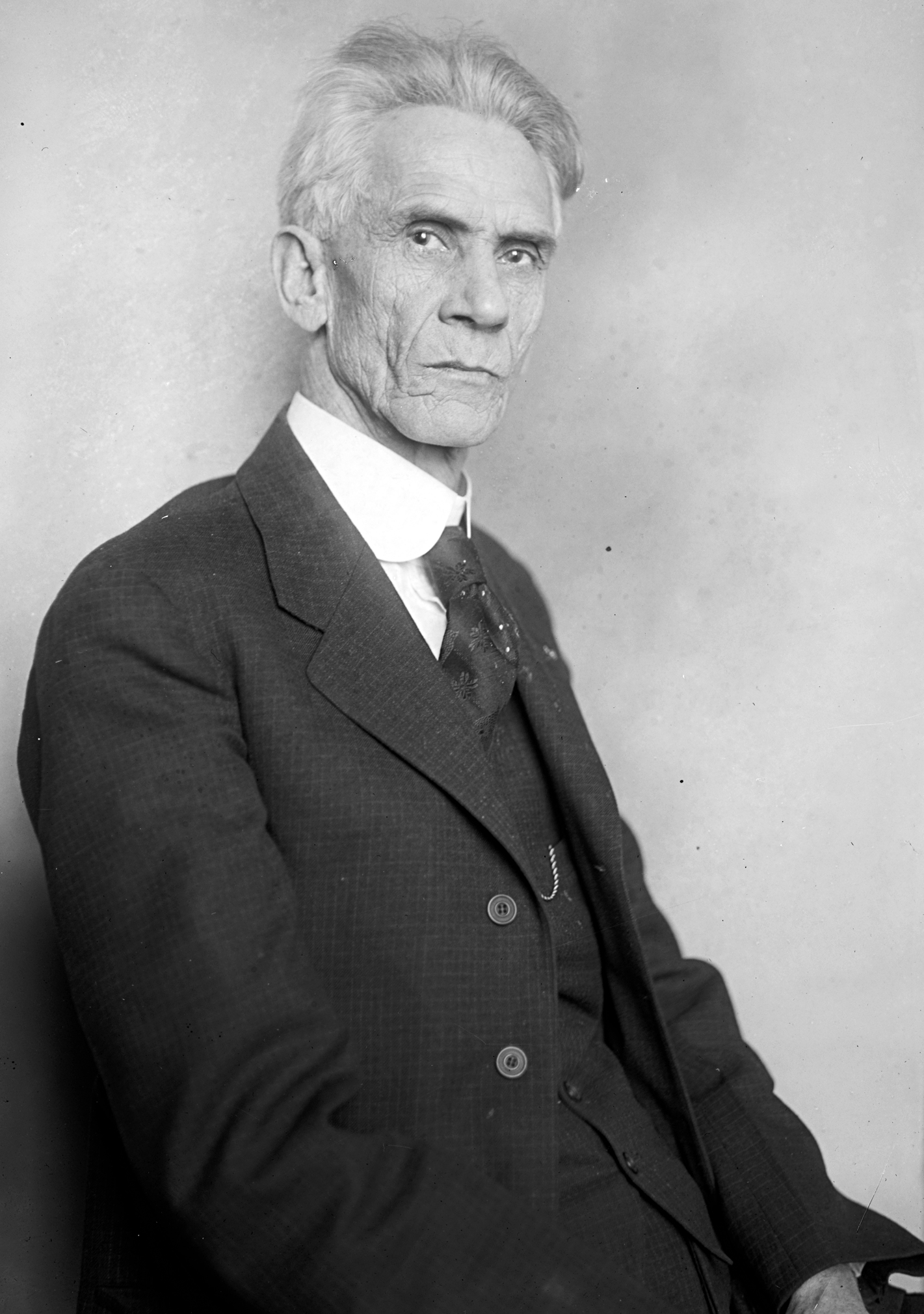

Member of the U.S. House of Representatives from Indiana's 12th district
- In office March 4, 1917 – March 3, 1925
- Preceded by: Cyrus Cline
- Succeeded by: David Hogg

Personal details
- Born: October 15, 1858 near Wapakoneta, Ohio, U.S.
- Died: February 20, 1930 (aged 71) Fort Wayne, Indiana, U.S.
- Resting place: Circle Hill Cemetery, Angola, Indiana
- Party: Republican
- Education: Ohio Northern University

Louis William Fairfield (October 15, 1858 – February 20, 1930) was an American educator and politician who served four terms as a U.S. representative from Indiana from 1917 to 1925.

== Biography ==
Born in a log cabin near Wapakoneta, Ohio, Fairfield moved to Allen County, Ohio, in 1866, and lived on a farm near Lima. After attending public school, he moved to Middle Point, Ohio, in 1872, teaching there for six months, before attending the Ohio Northern University at Ada in 1876.

He continued teaching and attending school until 1888. He was editor of the Hardin County Republican at Kenton, Ohio, in 1881 and 1882. He taught school in Middle Point in 1883 and 1884. He moved to Angola, Indiana, in 1885, as he was selected to help build Tri-State College there; Tri-State College later became Trine University. He served as vice president and teacher at the Tri-State College from 1885 to 1917.

He was an unsuccessful candidate for the State senate in 1912.

=== Congress ===
Fairfield was elected as a Republican to the Sixty-fifth and to the three succeeding Congresses, serving from March 4, 1917, to March 3, 1925. He served as chairman of the Committee on Insular Affairs during the Sixty-eighth Congress, from 1923 to 1925; he failed to be renominated by his party in 1924, thus terminating both his time as Congressman and his chairmanship.

=== Later career and death ===
After his time in Congress, he was occasionally engaged as a lecturer and lived in Angola, Indiana.

He died in Joliet, Illinois, while on a visit on February 20, 1930. He was interred in Circle Hill Cemetery, Angola, Indiana.

U.S. House of Representatives
Preceded by Cyrus Cline	Member of the U.S. House of Representatives from Indiana's 12th congressional district 1917-1925	Succeeded by David Hogg
