= William F. McNagny =

American politician

Member of the U.S. House of Representatives from Indiana's 12th district
- In office March 4, 1893 – March 3, 1895
- Preceded by: Charles A. O. McClellan
- Succeeded by: Jacob D. Leighty

Personal details
- Born: William Forgy McNagny; April 19, 1850 Tallmadge, Ohio, U.S.
- Died: August 24, 1923 (aged 73) Columbia City, Indiana, U.S.
- Resting place: Masonic Cemetery, Columbia City, Indiana
- Party: Democratic
- Profession: Attorney

William Forgy McNagny (April 19, 1850 – August 24, 1923) was an American businessman, educator, lawyer, and politician who served one term as a U.S. representative from Indiana from 1893 to 1895.

== Biography ==
Born in Tallmadge, Ohio, McNagny moved in early life to Whitley County, Indiana. He attended the public schools and Springfield Academy in South Whitley, Indiana.

=== Early career ===
He then taught school while working on his father's farm for six years. From 1868 to 1875, he served as the Larwill, Indiana station agent for the Pennsylvania Railroad.

While working for the railroad, McNagny studied law, was admitted to the bar in 1875, and commenced practice in Columbia City, Indiana as the partner of Thomas R. Marshall.

=== Congress ===
In 1892, McNagny was elected as a Democrat to the Fifty-third Congress. He served one term, March 4, 1893, to March 3, 1895. In 1894, he was an unsuccessful candidate for reelection to the Fifty-fourth Congress.

=== Later career and death ===
After leaving Congress, McNagny resumed the practice of law in Columbia City.

He died in Columbia City on August 24, 1923, and was interred in the city's Masonic Cemetery.

U.S. House of Representatives
Preceded by Charles A. O. McClellan	Member of the U.S. House of Representatives from Indiana's 12th congressional district March 4, 1893 – March 3, 1895	Succeeded by Jacob D. Leighty
