= Indiana's 12th congressional district =

Former U.S. House district from 1873 to 1943

- Obsolete district
- Created: 1875
- Eliminated: 1940
- Years active: 1875–1943

Indiana's 12th congressional district was a congressional district for the United States House of Representatives in Indiana. It was eliminated as a result of the 1940 census. It was last represented by Louis Ludlow who was redistricted into the 11th district.

== List of members representing the district ==
Member	Party	Years	Cong ress	Electoral history
District created March 4, 1875
Andrew H. Hamilton (Fort Wayne)	Democratic	March 4, 1875 – March 3, 1879	44th 45th	Elected in 1874. Re-elected in 1876. Retired.
Walpole G. Colerick (Fort Wayne)	Democratic	March 4, 1879 – March 3, 1883	46th 47th	Elected in 1878. Re-elected in 1880. Retired.
Robert Lowry (Fort Wayne)	Democratic	March 4, 1883 – March 3, 1887	48th 49th	Elected in 1882. Re-elected in 1884. Lost re-election.
James B. White (Fort Wayne)	Republican	March 4, 1887 – March 3, 1889	50th	Elected in 1886. Lost re-election.
Charles A. O. McClellan (Auburn)	Democratic	March 4, 1889 – March 3, 1893	51st 52nd	Elected in 1888. Re-elected in 1890. Retired.
William F. McNagny (Columbia City)	Democratic	March 4, 1893 – March 3, 1895	53rd	Elected in 1892. Lost re-election.
Jacob D. Leighty (St. Joe)	Republican	March 4, 1895 – March 3, 1897	54th	Elected in 1894. Lost re-election.
James M. Robinson (Fort Wayne)	Democratic	March 4, 1897 – March 3, 1905	55th 56th 57th 58th	Elected in 1896. Re-elected in 1898. Re-elected in 1900. Re-elected in 1902. Lost re-election.
Newton W. Gilbert (Fort Wayne)	Republican	March 4, 1905 – November 6, 1906	59th	Elected in 1904. Resigned to become Judge of First Instance in Manila, Philippines.
Clarence C. Gilhams (LaGrange)	Republican	November 6, 1906 – March 3, 1909	59th 60th	Elected to finish Gilbert's term. Re-elected in 1906. Lost re-election.
Cyrus Cline (Angola)	Democratic	March 4, 1909 – March 3, 1917	61st 62nd 63rd 64th	Elected in 1908. Re-elected in 1910. Re-elected in 1912. Re-elected in 1914. Lost re-election.
Louis W. Fairfield (Angola)	Republican	March 4, 1917 – March 3, 1925	65th 66th 67th 68th	Elected in 1916. Re-elected in 1918. Re-elected in 1920. Re-elected in 1922. Lost renomination.
David Hogg (Fort Wayne)	Republican	March 4, 1925 – March 3, 1933	69th 70th 71st 72nd	Elected in 1924. Re-elected in 1926. Re-elected in 1928. Re-elected in 1930. Redistricted to the 4th district and lost re-election.
Louis Ludlow (Indianapolis)	Democratic	March 4, 1933 – January 3, 1943	73rd 74th 75th 76th 77th	Redistricted from the 7th district and re-elected in 1932. Re-elected in 1934. Re-elected in 1936. Re-elected in 1938. Re-elected in 1940. Redistricted to the 11th district.
District eliminated January 3, 1943
