= Walpole G. Colerick =

American politician

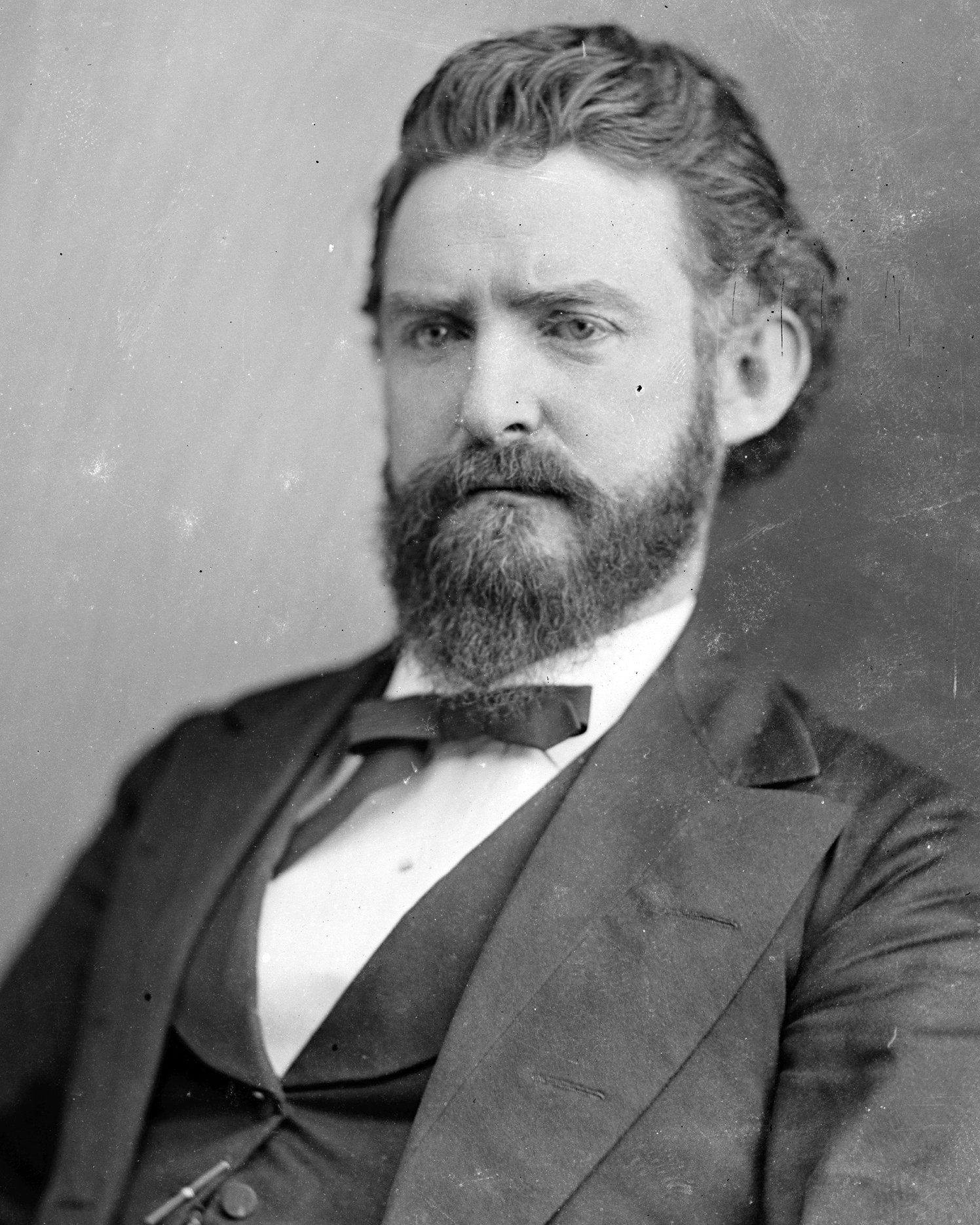

Member of the U.S. House of Representatives from Indiana's 12th district
- In office March 4, 1879 – March 3, 1883
- Preceded by: Andrew H. Hamilton
- Succeeded by: Robert Lowry

Personal details
- Born: Walpole Gillespie Colerick; August 1, 1845
- Died: January 11, 1911 (aged 65) Fort Wayne, Indiana, U.S.
- Resting place: Lindenwood Cemetery
- Party: Democratic

Walpole Gillespie Colerick (August 1, 1845 – January 11, 1911) was an American lawyer and politician who served two terms as a U.S. representative from Indiana from 1879 to 1883.

== Biography ==
Born in Fort Wayne, Indiana, Colerick attended public schools and studied law. He was admitted to the bar in 1872 and commenced practice in Fort Wayne.

Colerick was elected as a Democrat to the Forty-sixth and Forty-seventh Congresses (March 4, 1879 – March 3, 1883) and was a Supreme Court commissioner from 1883 to 1885. He again engaged in the practice of law in Fort Wayne until his death there on January 11, 1911. He was interred in Lindenwood Cemetery.

U.S. House of Representatives
Preceded by Andrew H. Hamilton	Member of the U.S. House of Representatives from Indiana's 12th congressional district March 4, 1879 – March 3, 1883	Succeeded by Robert Lowry
