= James Bain White =

American politician

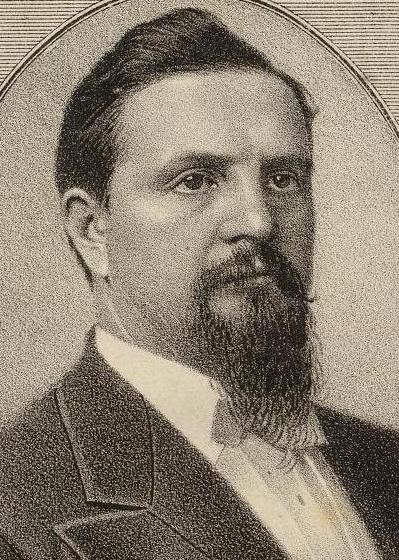

Member of the U.S. House of Representatives from Indiana's 12th district
- In office March 4, 1887 – March 3, 1889
- Preceded by: Robert Lowry
- Succeeded by: Charles A. O. McClellan

Personal details
- Born: June 26, 1835 Denny, Stirlingshire, Scotland
- Died: October 9, 1897 (aged 62) Fort Wayne, Indiana, U.S.
- Resting place: Lindenwood Cemetery.
- Party: Republican

James Bain White (June 26, 1835 – October 9, 1897) was an American Civil War veteran who served one term as a United States representative from Indiana from 1887 to 1889.

== Biography ==
White was born in Denny, Stirlingshire, Scotland, where he grew up and attended school. He immigrated to the United States as a young man in 1854 and settled in Fort Wayne, Indiana, where he worked as a calico printer and tailor.

=== Civil War ===
Upon the outbreak of the American Civil War, he volunteered for service in the Union Army and was elected captain of Company I, 30th Regiment Indiana Infantry. He was wounded at the Battle of Shiloh on April 7, 1862, and resigned from the Army eight months later, in December.

White returned to Fort Wayne and was elected a member of the city's Common Council in 1874. He also owned a department store, ran a wheel manufacturing business, and worked as a banker.

=== Congress ===
White was elected as a Republican to the 50th United States Congress (March 4, 1887 – March 3, 1889). He was an unsuccessful candidate for reelection to the 51st Congress in 1888.

=== Later career and death ===
White was a delegate at the 1892 Republican National Convention and a commissioner for the World's Columbian Exposition in Chicago in 1893. He died on October 9, 1897, in Fort Wayne and was interred there in Lindenwood Cemetery. {{White Memorial Fountain Location: Denny, Stirlingshire, Scotland

=== Legacy ===
In 1892, the White family donated a drinking fountain to the town of Denny. It was erected near Denny Old Parish Church at Broad Street in the junction of Denny Cross. Two years later, a family member, Mr. James B. White, gave £100 to the Town Council to create a fund from which the accrued interest would pay for annual maintenance of the cast iron fountain. The relevance of the drinking fountain declined in the early 20th century when it became an obstruction due to an increase in motor traffic, and the waning use of the structure as a source of water. In 1940, Mr. W. T. White of Fort Wayne, Indiana, the only living relative of the donor, was contacted for permission to remove the fountain due to the urgent national need for iron for the war effort. The fountain was removed in 1941. The fountain manufactured by Messrs. Steven Bros. & Co. of the Milton Ironworks, Glasgow and London was seated on a square stone plinth. A square base housed small demi-lune basins at ground level for dogs, and on four sides a large quatrefoil basin for horses was fed with overflow water. The highly decorated stanchion and central column were decorated with acanthus and floral relief. Lion mascarons, a symbol of guardianship, spouted water from which humans drank using metal cups suspended on consoles. A dolphin, symbolizing guardians of water, flanked each side of the stanchion. The base of the lamp column contained four mascarons crowned with a shell motif. A Corinthian column supported a central gas lantern surmounted with a knob finial. By 1917 the central lamp had been replaced by three smaller globes. A dedication plaque contained an inscription acknowledging that the fountain had been presented by the White Family.

U.S. House of Representatives
Preceded by Robert Lowry	Member of the U.S. House of Representatives from Indiana's 12th congressional district March 4, 1887 – March 3, 1889	Succeeded by Charles A. O. McClellan
