= Louis Ludlow =

American politician (1873–1950)

Louis Leon Ludlow
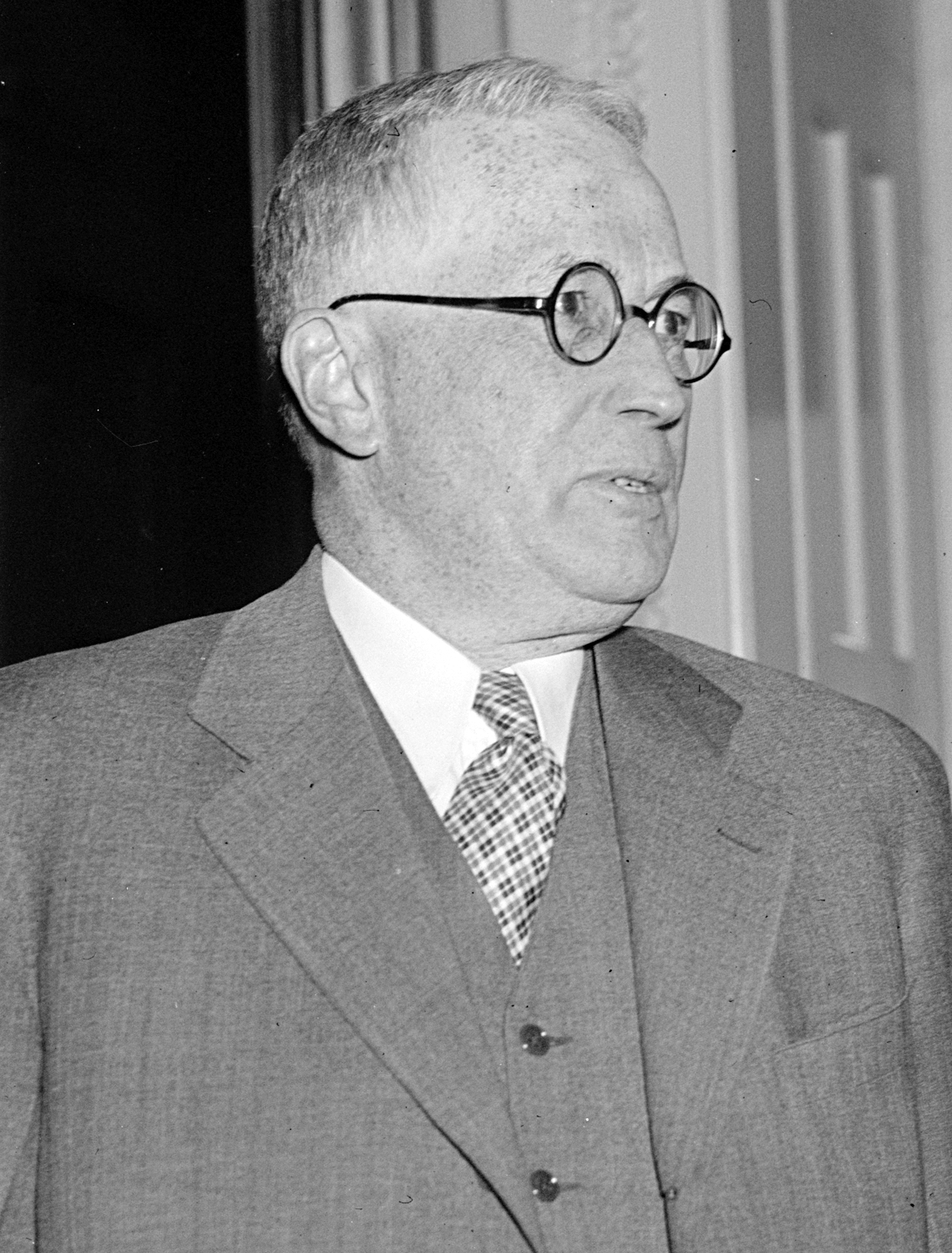

Member of the U.S. House of Representatives from Indiana
- In office March 4, 1929 – January 3, 1949
- Preceded by: Ralph E. Updike
- Succeeded by: Andrew Jacobs Sr.
- Constituency: 7th district (1929–1933); 12th district (1933–1943); 11th district (1943–1949)

Personal details
- Born: June 24, 1873 Connersville, Indiana, U.S.
- Died: November 28, 1950 (aged 77) Washington, D.C., U.S.
- Resting place: Rock Creek Cemetery; Washington, D.C., U.S.
- Party: Democratic
- Spouse: Katherine Huber
- Profession: Newspaper reporter

Louis Leon Ludlow (June 24, 1873 – November 28, 1950) was a Democratic Indiana congressman. He proposed the Ludlow Amendment to the United States Constitution in 1938 requiring a national referendum on any U.S. declaration of war except in cases of direct attack. The amendment was rejected by Congress by a narrow margin and after an appeal from President Franklin D. Roosevelt.

== Early and personal life ==
Ludlow was born on a farm near Connersville, Fayette County, Indiana, on June 24, 1873, as one of eight children of Henry Louis and Isabelle (Smiley) Ludlow. He was married on September 17, 1896, to Katherine Huber of Irvington, Indiana, the society editor on the Sentinel in Washington.

== Career ==
He moved to Indianapolis in 1892, where he became a reporter (for the Indianapolis Sun and then the Indianapolis Sentinel and the Indianapolis Press) and later a political writer. Ludlow was a Washington correspondent for Indiana and Ohio newspapers (the Indianapolis Star, the Star League of Indiana, the Columbus Dispatch, and the Ohio State Journal) and a member of the Congressional Press Galleries from 1901 to 1929. He was elected as a Democrat to the Seventy-first and the nine succeeding Congresses from 1929 to 1949.

He proposed the Ludlow Amendment to the United States Constitution in 1938 requiring a national referendum on any U.S. declaration of war except in cases of direct attack. The amendment was rejected by Congress by a vote of 209 to 188.

After his political career, Ludlow returned to working as a newspaper correspondent.

== Death ==
Ludlow died in Washington, D.C. on November 28, 1950. He was buried at Rock Creek Cemetery.

U.S. House of Representatives
Preceded by Ralph E. Updike	Member of the U.S. House of Representatives from Indiana's 7th congressional district 1929-1933	Succeeded by Arthur H. Greenwood
Preceded by David Hogg	Member of the U.S. House of Representatives from Indiana's 12th congressional district 1933-1943	District abolished
Preceded by William H. Larrabee	Member of the U.S. House of Representatives from Indiana's 11th congressional district 1943-1949	Succeeded by Andrew Jacobs Sr.
