= David Hogg (Indiana politician) =

American politician (1886–1973)

Member of the U.S. House of Representatives from Indiana's 12th district
- In office March 4, 1925 – March 3, 1933
- Preceded by: Louis W. Fairfield
- Succeeded by: Louis Ludlow

Personal details
- Born: August 21, 1886 near Crothersville, Indiana, U.S.
- Died: October 23, 1973 (aged 87) Fort Wayne, Indiana, U.S.
- Resting place: Lindenwood Cemetery, Fort Wayne, Indiana, U.S.
- Party: Republican
- Spouse: Mildred Sellers (m. 1925)
- Parent(s): Nelson T. Hogg; Nancy Ellen Hogg
- Education: Indiana University Bloomington
- Profession: Politician, lawyer

David Hogg (August 21, 1886 – October 23, 1973) was an American politician and lawyer who served four terms in the United States House of Representatives, representing the 12th congressional district of Indiana from 1925 to 1933 as a Republican.

== Early life and education ==
Hogg was born near Crothersville, Indiana, on August 21, 1886, to Nelson T. Hogg and Nancy Ellen Hogg. He graduated from the College of Liberal Arts in 1909 and from the law department at Indiana University Bloomington in 1912.

== Career ==
Hogg was admitted to the bar in 1913; he commenced practice in Fort Wayne, Indiana.

Hogg served as chairman of the Allen County Republican Central Committee from 1922 to 1924, resigning to run for Congress.

=== Congress ===
In 1924, Hogg was elected as a Republican to the 69th United States Congress, beginning his term on March 4, 1925. Hogg was re-elected to the three subsequent Congresses, finishing his final term on March 3, 1933. The Anti-Saloon League endorsed his candidacy in 1926.

Hogg was an unsuccessful candidate for re-election in 1932 to the 73rd United States Congress, in 1934 to the 74th United States Congress, and in 1936 to the 75th United States Congress.

=== Later career ===
Following his tenure in Congress, Hogg resumed practicing law, branching out into mutual life insurance in 1939. From 1940 to 1943, he served as president of Goodwill Industries of Fort Wayne.

From 1941 to 1946, Hogg co-published an interdenominational newspaper, after which he again resumed practicing law until his death.

== Personal life and death ==
Outside of politics, Hogg was a member of the Masonic Lodge, the Scottish Rite, the York Rite, and the YMCA.

Hogg married Mildred Sellers in 1925.

Hogg died at the age of 87 in Fort Wayne on October 23, 1973. He was interred in Lindenwood Cemetery.

U.S. House of Representatives
Preceded by Louis W. Fairfield	Member of the U.S. House of Representatives from Indiana's 12th congressional district 1925–1933	Succeeded by Louis Ludlow
