= Newton W. Gilbert =

American politician

Newton Whiting Gilbert
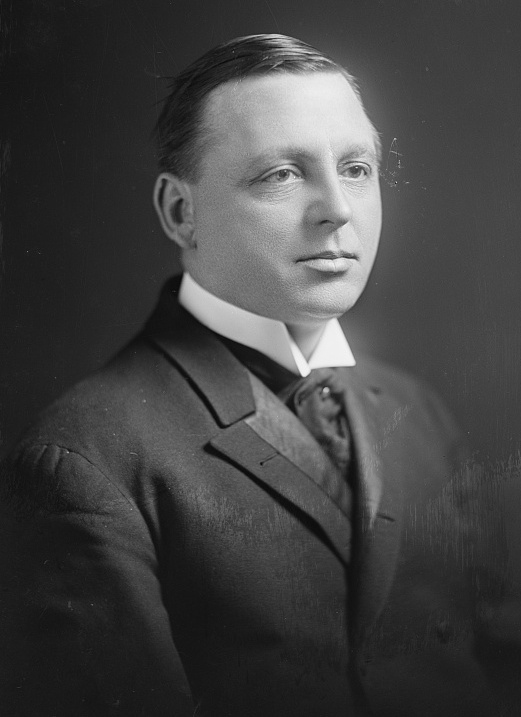

Member of the U.S. House of Representatives from Indiana's 12th district
- In office March 4, 1905 – November 6, 1906
- Preceded by: James M. Robinson
- Succeeded by: Clarence C. Gilhams

7th Philippine Secretary of Public Instruction
- In office March 1, 1909 – December 1, 1913
- Appointed by: William Cameron Forbes
- Preceded by: William Morgan Shuster
- Succeeded by: Henderson S. Martin

Acting Governor-General of the Philippines
- In office September 1, 1913 – October 6, 1913
- Preceded by: William Cameron Forbes
- Succeeded by: Francis Burton Harrison

Vice Governor-General of the Philippines
- In office February 14, 1910 – November 30, 1913
- Preceded by: William Cameron Forbes
- Succeeded by: Henderson S. Martin

25th Lieutenant Governor of Indiana
- In office January 11, 1901 – January 14, 1905
- Governor: Winfield T. Durbin
- Preceded by: William S. Haggard
- Succeeded by: Hugh Thomas Miller

Member of the Indiana Senate
- In office 1896–1900

Personal details
- Born: May 24, 1862 Worthington, Ohio, U.S.
- Died: July 5, 1939 (aged 77) Santa Ana, California, U.S.
- Resting place: Circle Hill Cemetery, Angola, Indiana
- Party: Republican

Newton Whiting Gilbert (May 24, 1862 – July 5, 1939) was an American politician from Indiana. He was member of the Indiana State Senate from 1896 to 1900, Lieutenant Governor of Indiana from 1900 to 1904, and elected Republican to the 59th Congress from 1905 to 1906.

He then left for the Philippines and served eleven years in the islands. In 1908, he was appointed member of the Philippine Commission and Chairman of the Board of Regents of the newly established University of the Philippines. He was also appointed as the Philippine Secretary of Public Instruction. He then became Vice Governor-General of the Philippines from 1910 to 1913 and acting Governor-General in 1913.

== Early life and education ==
Gilbert was born on May 24, 1862, in Worthington, Franklin County, Ohio. His parents moved in 1875 to Steuben County, Indiana. His father was Theodore Gilbert, a country merchant in Ohio, while his mother, Ellen L. Johnson, was the granddaughter of former Governor of Virginia, Joseph E. Johnson. He studied law at the Ohio State University and was admitted to the bar in 1885.

== Career ==
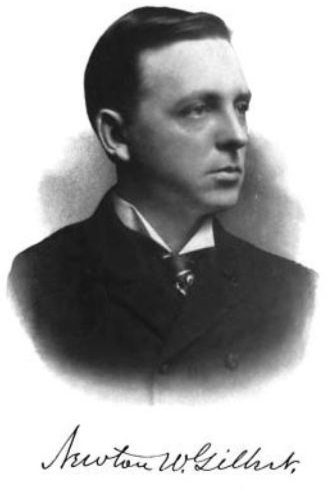
Gilbert as member of the Indiana State Senate, c. 1899

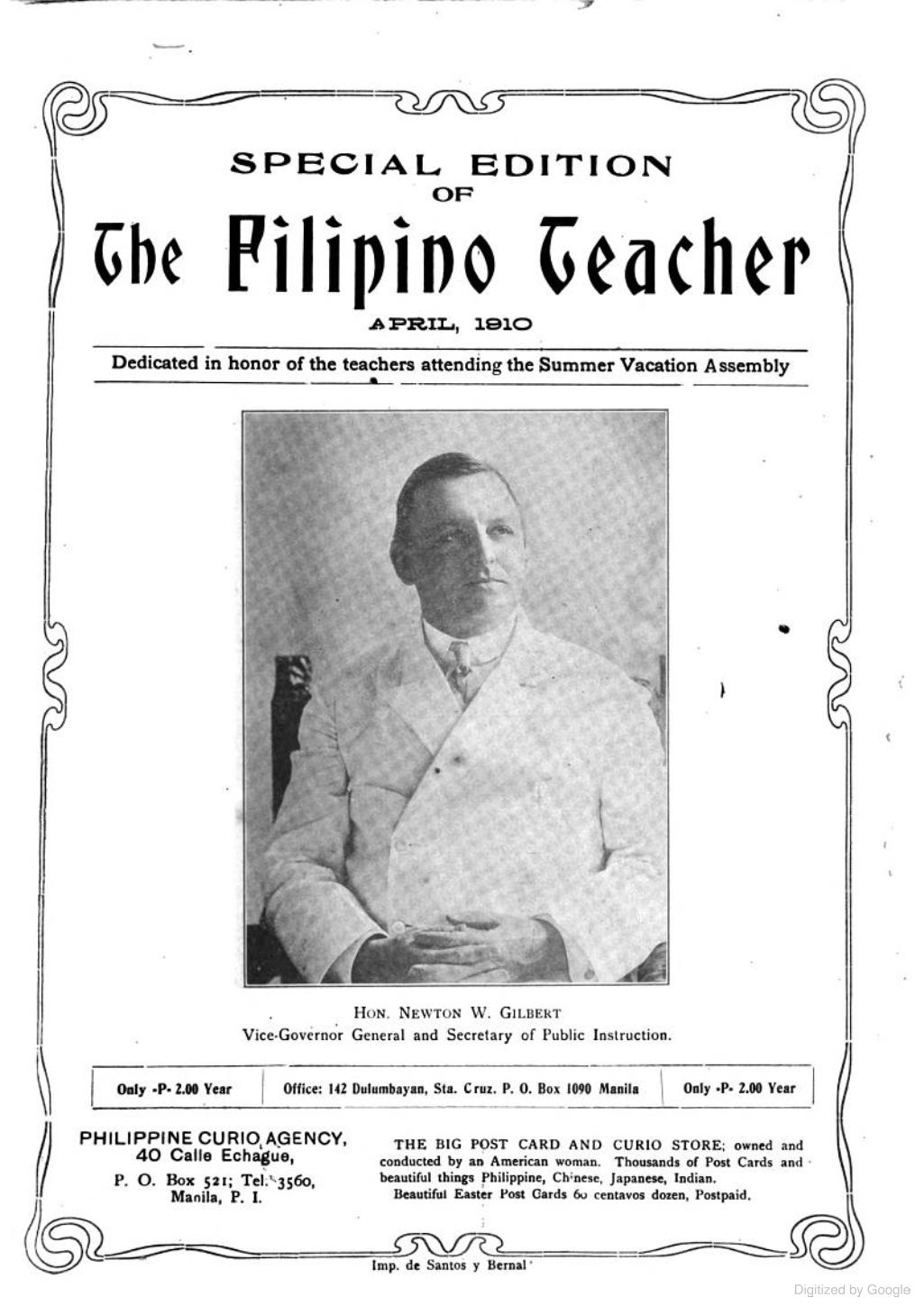
Gilbert depicted in the special edition of The Filipino Teacher, dated April 1910

In his early career, he practiced as a lawyer in Angola, Indiana and was appointed surveyor of Steuben County, Indiana in 1886. During the Spanish-American War, he was captain of Company H, One Hundred and Fifty-seventh Indiana Volunteer Infantry.

He was the 25th lieutenant governor of Indiana from 1900 to 1904, a member of the Indiana State Senate from 1896 to 1900 and a representative in the United States House of Representatives from March 4, 1905, until his resignation on November 6, 1906. In 1906, he accepted his appointment as judge of the court of first instance in Manila. He was Chairman of the Board of Regents and acting President of the University of the Philippines since its establishment in 1908. In 1910, he became Vice Governor-General of the Philippine Islands and an acting governor-general of the Philippines from September 1, 1913, to October 6, 1913.

In 1908, Newton W. Gilbert also served on the Philippine Commission, the appointed upper house of the Philippine Legislature of the American colonial Insular Government of the Philippines.

In 1916, he was a delegate to the Republican National Convention.

=== Philippine independence ===
Amidst the discussion on Philippine independence in 1930 on the U.S. Senate, Gilbert sent a letter to the Senate Territories Committee that U.S. withdrawal in the Philippines would disturb the "equilibrium" of the Far East. He feared of possible Chinese invasion and consequences of a World War.

It is only possible to keep them from the islands now by our Chinese exclusion act, which applies in the Philippine Islands. How can the Filipinos keep them out? It would require an army, and more, a navy, to keep the Chinese from their shores.

— Newton W. Gilbert, The New York Times (March 4, 1930)

In 1937, Gilbert retired from politics. He moved to Santa Ana, California and died there on July 5, 1939.

== Legacy ==
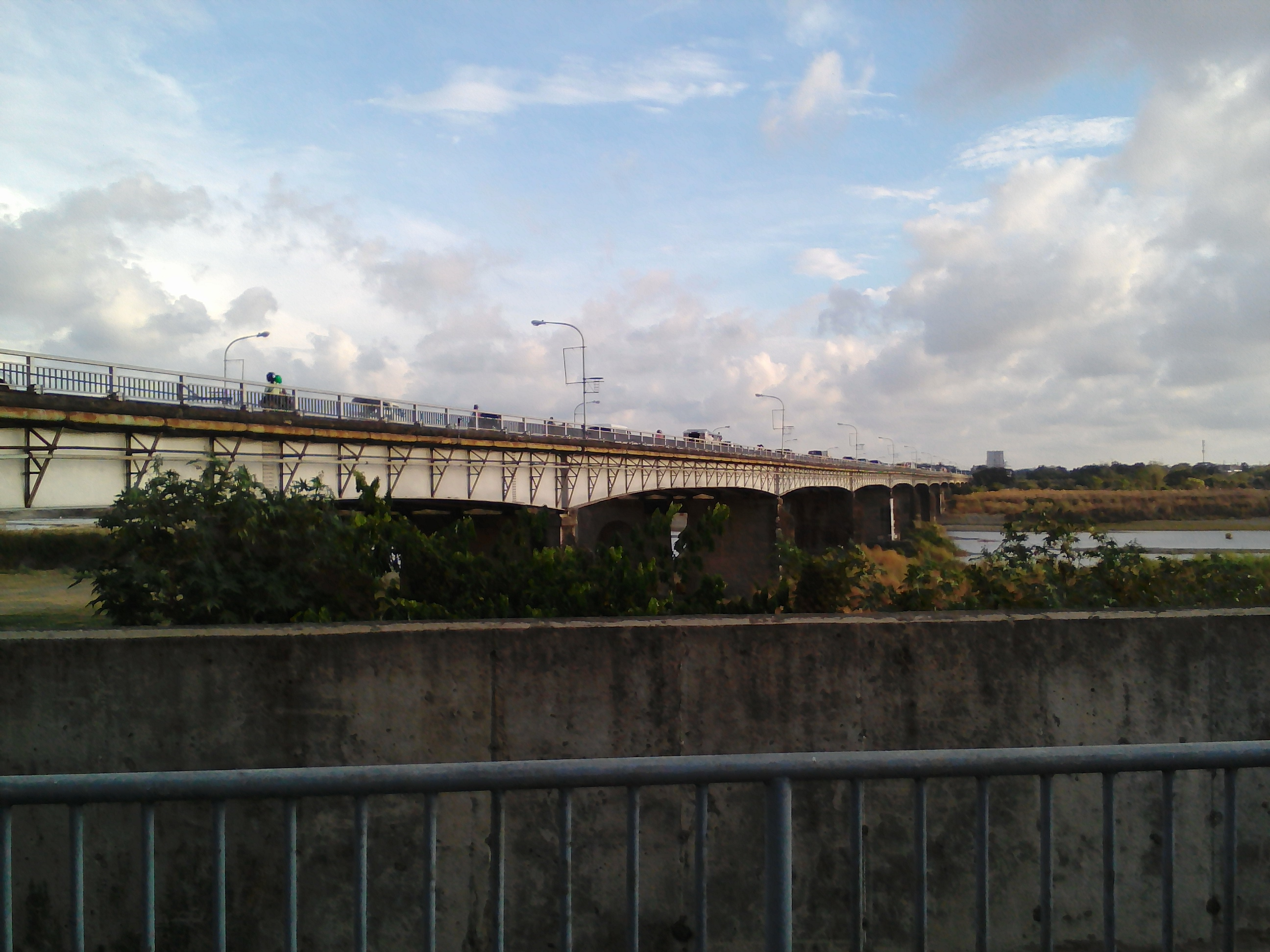
Gilbert Bridge in Laoag City, Ilocos Norte, Philippines

In 1914, the Gilbert Bridge in Laoag City, Ilocos Norte, Philippines was completed and named after Gilbert.

== Selected publications ==
- Gilbert, Newton W. (July 1, 1933). "Effects of Independence on the Philippines". The Annals of the American Academy of Political and Social Science. 168 (1): 162–165. doi:10.1177/000271623316800121. ISSN 0002-7162.
- Gilbert, Newton W. (1927). "Our Promises Should Be Kept". The Annals of the American Academy of Political and Social Science. 131: 14–18. doi:10.1177/0002716227131001S04. ISSN 0002-7162. JSTOR 1015505.

Political offices
Preceded by William S. Haggard	Lieutenant Governor of Indiana; 1901–1905	Succeeded by Hugh Thomas Miller
U.S. House of Representatives
Preceded by James M. Robinson	Member of the U.S. House of Representatives from Indiana's 12th congressional district 1905–1906	Succeeded by Clarence C. Gilhams
Political offices
Preceded by James Francis Smith	Governor-General of the Philippines; 1907–1908	Succeeded by William Cameron Forbes
