= Jacob D. Leighty =

American politician

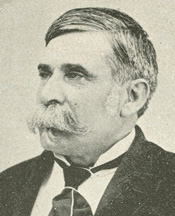

Member of the U.S. House of Representatives from Indiana's 12th district
- In office March 4, 1895 – March 3, 1897
- Preceded by: William F. McNagny
- Succeeded by: James M. Robinson

Member of the Indiana House of Representatives
- In office 1886-1888

Personal details
- Born: November 15, 1839 Greensburg, Pennsylvania
- Died: October 18, 1912 (aged 72) St. Joe, Indiana
- Resting place: Riverview Cemetery
- Party: Republican
- Education: Wittenberg College

Military service
- Allegiance: Union Army
- Years of service: 1861–1865
- Unit: Company E, Eleventh Indiana Volunteer Zouave Infantry

Jacob D. Leighty (November 15, 1839 – October 18, 1912) was a U.S. representative from Indiana. He had previously served with the Union Army during the American Civil War.

== Early life and Union Army service ==
Born near Greensburg, Pennsylvania on November 15, 1839, Leighty moved with his parents to De Kalb County, Indiana in 1844, settling on a farm at Spencerville. Educated at public schools, he then spent two years at a commercial school at Fort Wayne following which he entered Wittenberg College, in Springfield, Ohio.

On July 1, 1861, after two years in college, he enlisted in the Union Army, becoming a member of Company E, Eleventh Indiana Volunteer Zouave Infantry. He served during the American Civil War.

== Later life and congressional term ==
After the war, Leighty engaged in farming and general merchandising with his father until 1875, when he established the town of St. Joe, in Indiana. He served as a member of the State house of representatives from 1886 to 1888, and later was elected as a Republican to the Fifty-fourth Congress (March 4, 1895 – March 4, 1897). He was an unsuccessful candidate for reelection in 1896 to the Fifty-fifth Congress.

Leighty later worked as a United States pension agent at Indianapolis from 1897 to 1901.

== Death ==
He died at St. Joe, De Kalb County, Indiana, on October 18, 1912, and is interred in Riverview Cemetery.

== See also ==
- Union Army
- 55th United States Congress

U.S. House of Representatives
Preceded by William F. McNagny	Member of the U.S. House of Representatives from Indiana's 12th congressional district March 4, 1895 – March 3, 1897	Succeeded by James M. Robinson
