= Charles A. O. McClellan =

American politician

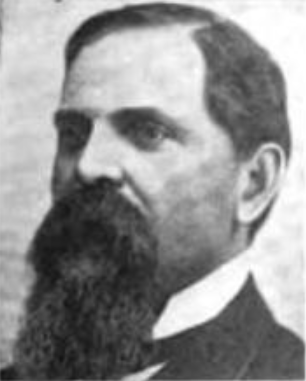

Member of the U.S. House of Representatives from Indiana's 12th district
- In office March 4, 1889 – March 3, 1893
- Preceded by: James B. White
- Succeeded by: William F. McNagny

Personal details
- Born: May 25, 1835 Ashland, Ohio, U.S.
- Died: January 31, 1898 (aged 62) Auburn, Indiana, U.S.
- Resting place: Waterloo Cemetery
- Party: Democratic
- Occupation: Lawyer, banker, politician

Charles A. O. McClellan (May 25, 1835 – January 31, 1898) was an American banker, lawyer, and jurist who served two terms as a U.S. representative from Indiana from 1889 to 1893.

== Biography ==
Born in Ashland, Ohio, McClellan moved to Auburn, Indiana, in 1856. He attended the public schools. He studied law in Auburn and Waterloo, Indiana. He was admitted to the bar in 1863 and commenced practice in Waterloo.

He became engaged in banking in 1868.

He was appointed judge of the Fortieth Judicial Circuit of Indiana by Governor Williams in 1879, and served for two years.

=== Congress ===
McClellan was elected as a Democrat to the Fifty-first and Fifty-second Congresses (March 4, 1889 – March 3, 1893). He served as chairman of the Committee on Expenditures in the Department of the Navy (Fifty-second Congress). He was not a candidate for renomination in 1892.

=== Later career and death ===
He again engaged in banking and the practice of law. He died in Auburn, Indiana, January 31, 1898. He was interred in Waterloo Cemetery, Waterloo, Indiana.

U.S. House of Representatives
Preceded by James B. White	Member of the U.S. House of Representatives from Indiana's 12th congressional district March 4, 1889 – March 3, 1893	Succeeded by William F. McNagny
