= Robert Lowry (Indiana politician) =

American politician

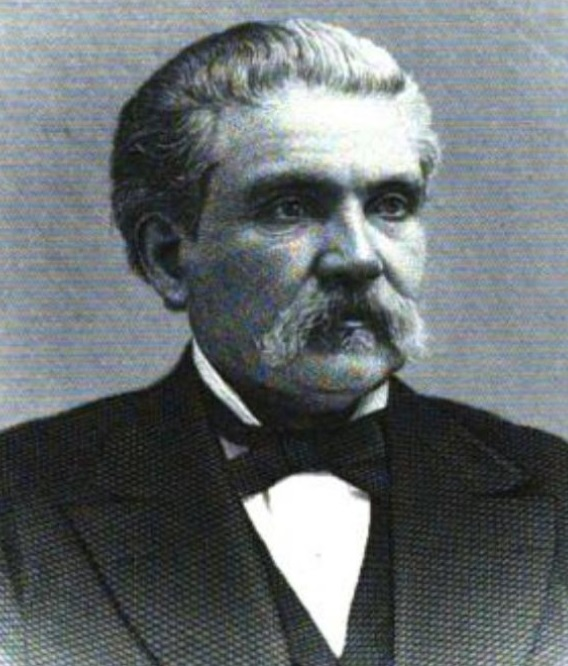
- From Volume II (1889) of Valley of the Upper Maumee River

Member of the U.S. House of Representatives from Indiana's 12th district
- In office March 4, 1883 – March 3, 1887
- Preceded by: Walpole G. Colerick
- Succeeded by: James B. White

Personal details
- Born: April 2, 1824 Killyleagh, County Down, Ireland
- Died: January 27, 1904 (aged 79) Fort Wayne, Indiana, U.S.
- Resting place: Lindenwood Cemetery, Fort Wayne, Indiana
- Party: Democratic
- Occupation: Attorney

Robert Lowry (April 2, 1824 – January 27, 1904) was a U.S. representative from Indiana.

Born in Killyleagh, County Down, Ireland, Lowry immigrated to the United States and settled in Rochester, New York. He was educated in private schools and had partial academic course. Librarian of Rochester Athenaeum and Young Men's Association. He studied law. He moved to Fort Wayne, Indiana, in 1843. City recorder in 1844 and 1845. He was admitted to the bar in 1846 and commenced practice in Goshen, Indiana. Auditor of Elkhart County in 1852. Circuit judge in 1852. He served as president of the Democratic State convention. He served as delegate to the Democratic National Conventions at Baltimore in 1860 and 1872. He served as circuit judge from 1864 until January 1875, when he resigned. He served as judge of the superior court in 1877 and 1878.

Lowry was elected the first president of the Indiana State Bar Association in July 1879.

Lowry was elected as a Democrat to the Forty-eighth and Forty-ninth Congresses (March 4, 1883 – March 3, 1887). He served as chairman of the Committee on Expenditures in the Department of the Treasury (Forty-ninth Congress). He was an unsuccessful candidate for reelection in 1886 to the Fiftieth Congress. He resumed the practice of law. He died in Fort Wayne, Indiana, January 27, 1904. He was interred in Lindenwood Cemetery.

U.S. House of Representatives
Preceded by Walpole G. Colerick	Member of the U.S. House of Representatives from Indiana's 12th congressional district March 4, 1883 – March 3, 1887	Succeeded by James B. White
