= James M. Robinson (politician) =

American politician (1861–1942)

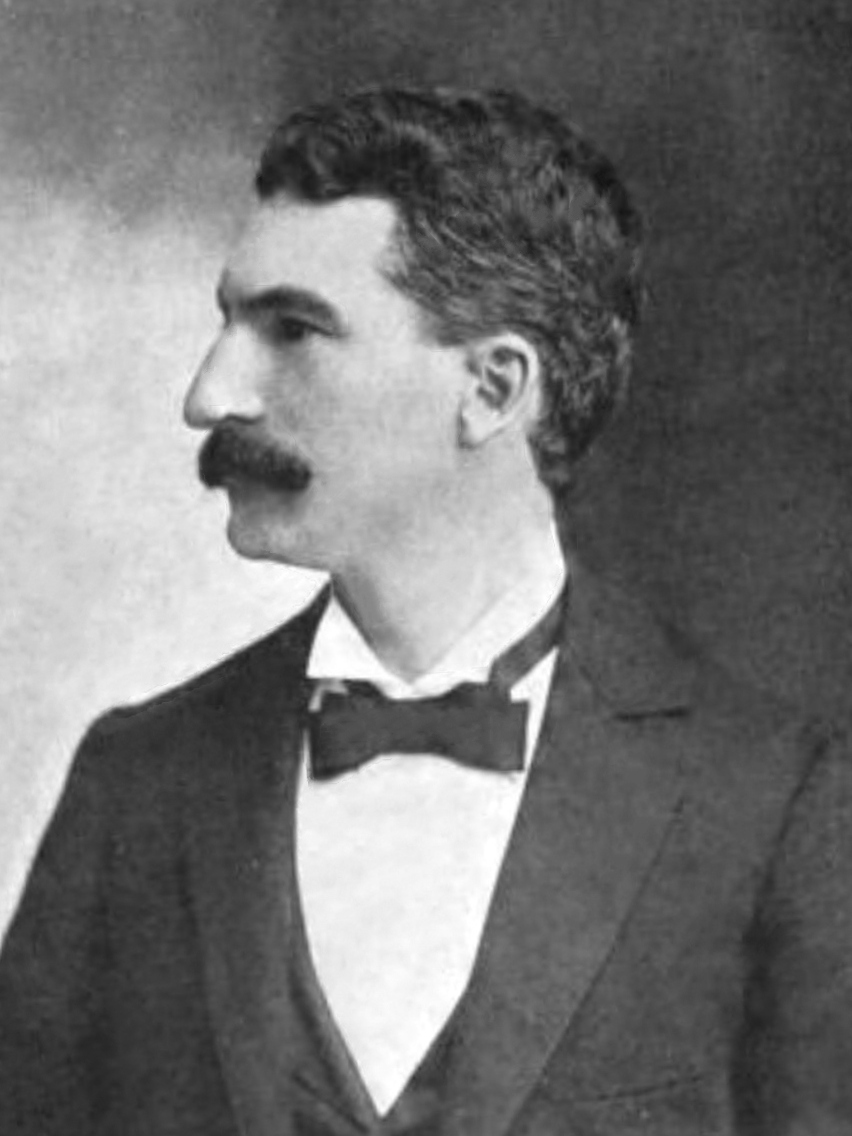

Member of the U.S. House of Representatives from Indiana's 12th district
- In office March 4, 1897 – March 3, 1905
- Preceded by: Jacob D. Leighty
- Succeeded by: Newton W. Gilbert

Personal details
- Born: James McClellan Robinson; May 31, 1861 Fort Wayne, Indiana, U.S.
- Died: January 16, 1942 (aged 80) Los Angeles, California, U.S.
- Resting place: Lindenwood Cemetery
- Party: Democratic

James McClellan Robinson (May 31, 1861 – January 16, 1942) was an American lawyer and politician who served four terms as a U.S. representative from Indiana from 1897 to 1905.

== Biography ==
Born on a farm near Fort Wayne, Indiana, Robinson attended the public schools. He studied law. He was admitted to the bar in 1882 and commenced practice in Fort Wayne, Indiana.

He served as prosecuting attorney for the thirty-eighth judicial circuit of Indiana 1886–1890. He resumed the practice of law.

=== Congress ===
Robinson was elected as a Democrat to the Fifty-fifth and to the three succeeding Congresses (March 4, 1897 – March 3, 1905). He was an unsuccessful candidate for reelection in 1904 to the Fifty-ninth Congress.

=== Later career and death ===
He continued the practice of law in Fort Wayne, Indiana, until 1908. He moved to Los Angeles, California, in 1911.

He died in Los Angeles, January 16, 1942. He was interred in Lindenwood Cemetery, Fort Wayne, Indiana.

U.S. House of Representatives
Preceded by Jacob D. Leighty	Member of the U.S. House of Representatives from Indiana's 12th congressional district March 4, 1897 – March 3, 1905	Succeeded by Newton W. Gilbert
