= George W. Faris =

American politician (1854–1914)

George Faris
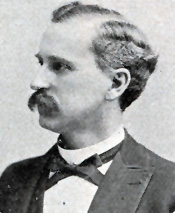

Member of the U.S. House of Representatives from Indiana
- In office March 4, 1895 – March 3, 1901
- Preceded by: Elijah V. Brookshire (8th); Jesse Overstreet (5th)
- Succeeded by: Charles L. Henry (8th); Elias S. Holliday (5th)
- Constituency: 8th district (1895-97); 5th district (1897-1901)

Personal details
- Born: June 9, 1854 Rensselaer, Indiana, U.S.
- Died: April 17, 1914 (aged 59) Terre Haute, Indiana, U.S.
- Resting place: Highland Lawn Cemetery; Terre Haute, Indiana, U.S.
- Party: Republican
- Spouse: Anna Claypool (m. 1878)
- Education: Asbury (now DePauw) University; Indiana University

George Washington Faris (June 9, 1854 – April 17, 1914) was an American lawyer and politician who served three terms as a U.S. representative from Indiana from 1895 to 1901.

== Biography ==
Born near Rensselaer, Indiana, to James and Margaret, Faris attended the public schools. He was graduated from Asbury University, Greencastle, Indiana, in 1877. He studied law.

He was admitted to the bar in 1877 and commenced practice in Indianapolis, Indiana. He moved to Terre Haute, Indiana, in 1880 and continued the practice of law. He was an unsuccessful Republican candidate for judge of the circuit court in 1884.

=== Congress ===
Faris was elected as a Republican to the Fifty-fourth, Fifty-fifth, and Fifty-sixth Congresses (March 4, 1895 – March 3, 1901). He served as chairman of the Committee on Manufactures (Fifty-fifth and Fifty-sixth Congresses). He declined to be a candidate for renomination in 1900.

=== Later career and death ===
He resumed the practice of law in Terre Haute, Indiana, and shortly thereafter moved to Washington, D.C., and continued the practice of law until his death in that city on April 17, 1914. He was interred in Highland Lawn Cemetery, Terre Haute.

== Personal life ==
In 1878, he married Anna Claypool, daughter of Solomon Claypool.

U.S. House of Representatives
| Preceded by Elijah V. Brookshire | Member of the U.S. House of Representatives from Indiana's 8th congressional district 1895-1897 | Succeeded by Charles L. Henry |
| Preceded by Jesse Overstreet | Member of the U.S. House of Representatives from Indiana's 5th congressional district 1897-1901 | Succeeded by Elias S. Holliday |
