= John E. Lamb =

American politician

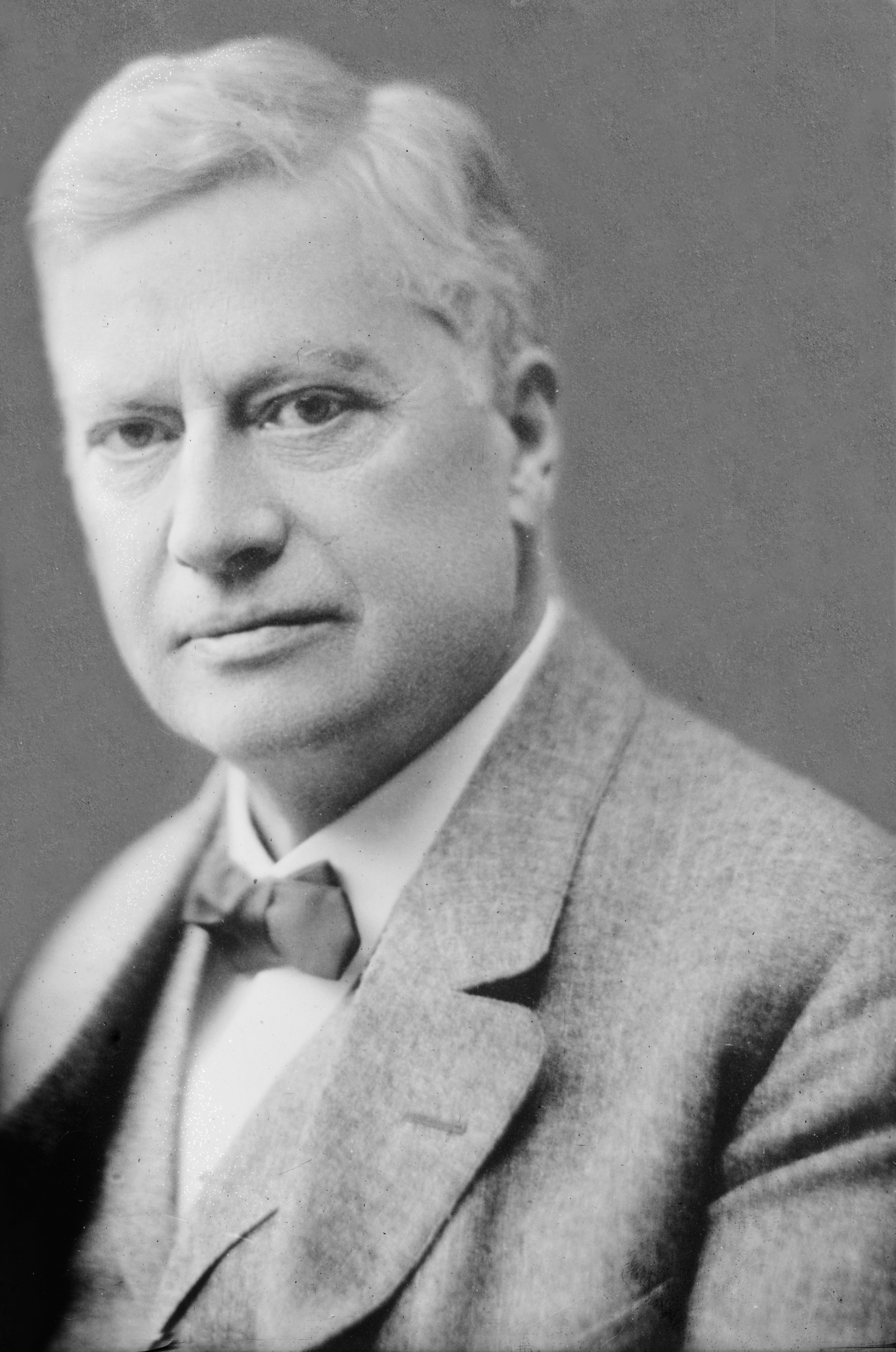

Member of the U.S. House of Representatives from Indiana's 8th district
- In office March 4, 1883 – March 3, 1885
- Preceded by: Robert B. F. Peirce
- Succeeded by: James T. Johnston

Personal details
- Born: John Edward Lamb; December 26, 1852 Terre Haute, Indiana, U.S.
- Died: August 23, 1914 (aged 61) Terre Haute, Indiana, U.S.
- Resting place: Calvary Cemetery

John Edward Lamb (December 26, 1852 – August 23, 1914) was an American lawyer and politician who served one term as a U.S. representative from Indiana from 1883 to 1885.

== Biography ==
Born in Terre Haute, Indiana, Lamb attended the common schools and was graduated from the Terre Haute High School. He studied law and was admitted to the bar in 1873, commencing practice in Terre Haute. He served as prosecuting attorney of the fourteenth judicial circuit from 1875 to 1880.

=== Congress ===
Lamb was elected as a Democrat to the Forty-eighth Congress and served from March 4, 1883, to March 3, 1885.

=== Later career ===
Afterwards, he resumed the practice of law in Terre Haute. He was appointed United States district attorney for Indiana July 10, 1885, and served until August 16, 1886.

He served as delegate to the Democratic National Conventions in 1892, 1896, 1904, 1908, and 1912.

=== Death and burial ===
He died in Terre Haute, Indiana, August 23, 1914, and was interred in Calvary Cemetery.

U.S. House of Representatives
Preceded by Robert B. F. Peirce	Member of the U.S. House of Representatives from Indiana's 8th congressional district March 4, 1883 – March 3, 1885	Succeeded by James T. Johnston
