= James T. Johnston =

American politician and lawyer

James Johnston
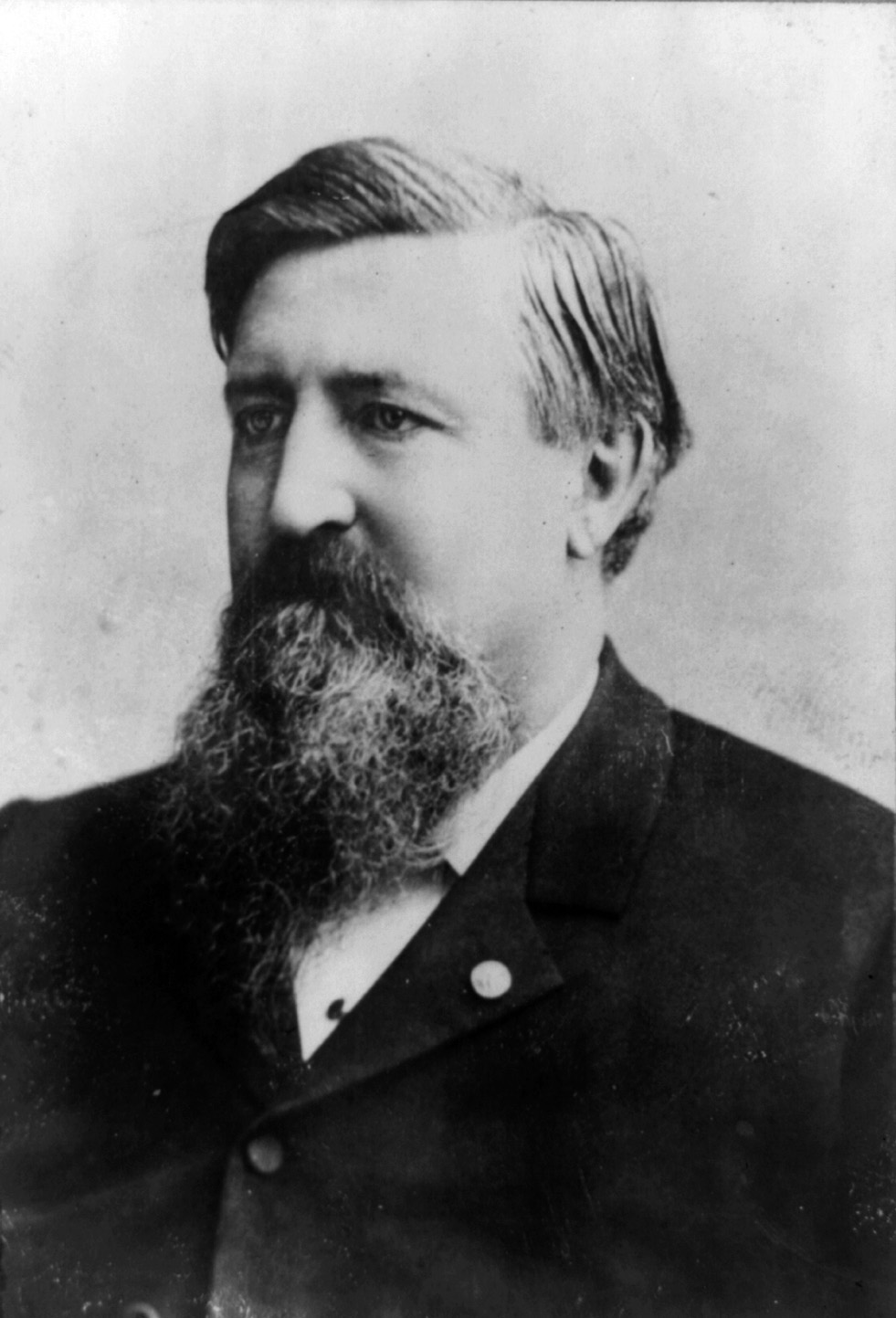

Member of the U.S. House of Representatives from Indiana's 8th district
- In office March 4, 1885 – March 3, 1889
- Preceded by: John E. Lamb
- Succeeded by: Elijah V. Brookshire

Member of the Indiana Senate
- In office 1874–1878

Member of the Indiana House of Representatives from the ? district
- In office 1868–1868

Personal details
- Born: January 19, 1839 Indiana, U.S.
- Died: July 19, 1904 (aged 65) Rockville, Indiana, U.S.
- Party: Republican

Military service
- Branch/service: U.S. Army (Union Army)
- Years of service: 1862–1865
- Battles/wars: American Civil War

James Thomas Johnston (January 19, 1839 – July 19, 1904) was an American lawyer, Civil War veteran, and politician who served two terms as a U.S. representative from Indiana from 1885 to 1889.

== Biography ==
Born near Greencastle, Indiana, Johnston attended the common schools. He studied law. During the Civil War he enlisted as a private in Company C, Sixth Indiana Cavalry, in July 1862. He transferred to Company A, Eighth Tennessee Cavalry, in September 1863 and was commissioned as a second lieutenant, serving until January 1864, when he resigned. Afterwards he served as a commissary sergeant of the One Hundred and Thirty-third Regiment, Indiana Volunteer Infantry. Commissioned as a lieutenant and assistant quartermaster of the One Hundred and Forty-ninth Regiment, Indiana Volunteer Infantry, he was mustered out in September 1865.

He was admitted to the bar in March 1866 and commenced practice in Rockville, Indiana. He served as prosecuting attorney 1866–1868. He served as member of the State house of representatives in 1868. He served in the State senate 1874–1878.

=== Congress ===
Johnston was elected as a Republican to the Forty-ninth and Fiftieth Congresses (March 4, 1885 – March 3, 1889). He was an unsuccessful candidate for reelection.

=== Later career and death ===
He resumed the practice of law. He was the Commander of the Grand Army of the Republic, Department of Indiana, in 1893.

He died in Rockville, Indiana, July 19, 1904 and was interred in the Rockville Cemetery.

U.S. House of Representatives
Preceded by John E. Lamb	Member of the U.S. House of Representatives from Indiana's 8th congressional district March 4, 1885 – March 3, 1889	Succeeded by Elijah V. Brookshire
