= William Heilman =

American politician

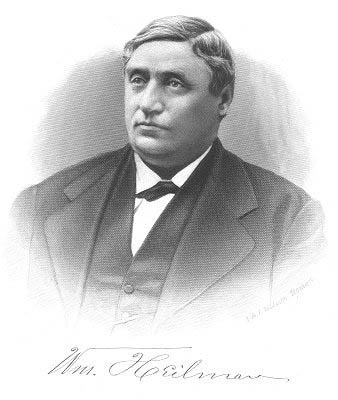

Member of the U.S. House of Representatives from Indiana's 1st district
- In office March 4, 1879 – March 3, 1883
- Preceded by: Benoni S. Fuller
- Succeeded by: John J. Kleiner

Member of the Indiana Senate
- In office 1876 – March 3, 1879

Member of the Indiana House of Representatives from the ? district
- In office 1870–1876

Personal details
- Born: October 11, 1824 Albig, Grand Duchy of Hesse
- Died: September 22, 1890 (aged 79) Evansville, Indiana, U.S.
- Resting place: Oak Hill Cemetery
- Party: Republican
- Relatives: Charles M. La Follette (great-grandson)

William Heilman (October 11, 1824 – September 22, 1890) was an American businessman who served two terms as a U.S. representative from Indiana from 1879 to 1883.

He was the great-grandfather of Charles Marion LaFollette.

== Biography ==
Born in Albig, Grand Duchy of Hesse, Heilman immigrated to the United States in 1843 and settled on a farm in Posey County, Indiana. After moving to Evansville, Indiana, he worked for a manufacturing company and subsequently became president of a cotton mill. In 1847, he founded a machine shop for the manufacture of drills.

== Political career ==
Heilman served as a member of the city council 1852–1865, a member of the Indiana House of Representatives 1870–1876 and a delegate to the Republican National Convention in 1876. He served in the Indiana State Senate from 1876 until March 3, 1879.

=== Congress ===
Heilman was elected as a Republican to the Forty-sixth and Forty-seventh Congresses (March 4, 1879 – March 3, 1883). He was an unsuccessful candidate for reelection in 1882 to the Forty-eighth Congress, losing the general election to John Kleiner.

== Later career and death ==
Heilman resumed his former business activities.

He died in Evansville, Indiana, September 22, 1890 and was interred in Oak Hill Cemetery.

== Electoral history ==
General election 1878
Party	Candidate	Votes	%
Republican	William Heilman	13,928	48.7
Democratic	Thomas E. Garvin	13,928	48.7
Greenback	Thomas F. Drebruler	1,595	5.6

General election 1880
Party	Candidate	Votes	%
Republican	William Heilman	17,719	49.4
Democratic	John Kleiner	17,420	48.6

General election 1882
Party	Candidate	Votes	%
Democratic	John Kleiner	18,048	51.6
Republican	William Heilman	16,399	46.9

U.S. House of Representatives
Preceded by Benoni S. Fuller	Member of the U.S. House of Representatives from Indiana's 1st congressional district 1879–1883	Succeeded by John J. Kleiner
