= Jesse Overstreet =

American politician

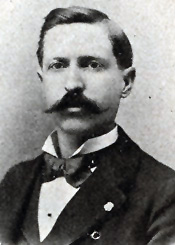

Member of the U.S. House of Representatives from Indiana
- In office March 4, 1895 – March 3, 1909
- Preceded by: George W. Cooper (5th); Charles L. Henry (7th)
- Succeeded by: George W. Faris (5th); Charles A. Korbly (7th)
- Constituency: 5th district (1895-97); 7th district (1897-1909)

Personal details
- Born: December 14, 1859 Franklin, Indiana, U.S.
- Died: May 27, 1910 (aged 50) Indianapolis, Indiana, U.S.
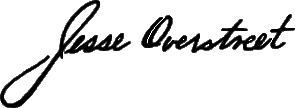
- Signature

Jesse E. Overstreet (December 14, 1859 – May 27, 1910) was an American lawyer and politician who served seven terms as a U.S. representative from Indiana from 1895 to 1909. In 1900, Overstreet introduced the legislation that was ultimately passed as the Gold Standard Act.

== Biography ==
Born in Franklin, Indiana, Overstreet attended the schools of his native city. He was graduated from the Franklin High School in 1877 and from Franklin College in 1882. He studied law. He was admitted to the bar in 1886 and commenced practice in Franklin. He served as member of the Republican State central committee of Indiana in 1892.

== Congress ==
Overstreet was elected as a Republican to the Fifty-fourth and to the six succeeding Congresses (March 4, 1895 - March 3, 1909). He served as chairman of the Committee on Expenditures in the Department of Justice (Fifty-sixth and Fifty-seventh Congresses), Committee on the Post Office and Post Roads (Fifty-eighth through Sixtieth Congresses). He was an unsuccessful candidate for reelection in 1908 to the Sixty-first Congress.

== Later career and death ==
He resumed the practice of his profession.

He died in Indianapolis, Indiana, May 27, 1910. He was interred in the Columbus City Cemetery, Columbus, Indiana.

U.S. House of Representatives
Preceded by George W. Cooper	Member of the U.S. House of Representatives from Indiana's 5th congressional district 1895-1897	Succeeded by George W. Faris
Preceded by Charles L. Henry	Member of the U.S. House of Representatives from Indiana's 7th congressional district 1897-1909	Succeeded by Charles A. Korbly
