= John J. Kleiner =

American politician (1845–1911)

John Kleiner

Member of the U.S. House of Representatives from Indiana's 1st district
- In office March 4, 1883 – March 3, 1887
- Preceded by: William Heilman
- Succeeded by: Alvin P. Hovey

Personal details
- Born: February 8, 1845 West Hanover, Pennsylvania, U.S.
- Died: May 8, 1911 (aged 66) Takoma Park, Maryland, U.S
- Resting place: Rock Creek Cemetery
- Party: Democratic

Military service
- Branch/service: Union Army
- Years of service: June 20, 1863–February 10, 1864
- Unit: Company G 86th Ohio Infantry Regiment
- Battles/wars: American Civil War

John Jay Kleiner (February 8, 1845 – April 8, 1911) was an American educator and politician who served two terms as a U.S. representative from Indiana 1883 to 1887.

== Biography ==
Born in West Hanover, Pennsylvania, Kleiner moved to Medina County, Ohio, in 1850 with his parents, who settled near Wadsworth. He attended the public schools and assisted his father in agricultural pursuits. During the Civil War Kleiner enlisted on June 20, 1863, in Company G, Eighty-sixth Regiment, Ohio Volunteer Infantry, and served until February 10, 1864.

He returned to Wadsworth, Ohio, where he resided until 1867. He moved to Evansville, Indiana, in 1867. He taught in the Evansville Business College and edited the Saturday Argus of that city.

=== Political career ===
He served as member of the city council of Evansville in 1873. He engaged in the manufacture and sale of lumber. He served as mayor of Evansville 1874–1880.

Kleiner was elected as a Democrat to the Forty-eighth and Forty-ninth Congresses (March 4, 1883 – March 3, 1887). He was an unsuccessful candidate for reelection.

=== Later career and death ===
He engaged in the real estate business and stock raising at Pierre, South Dakota, in 1887.

He moved to Washington, D.C., in 1890 and engaged in the real estate business until his death in Takoma Park, Maryland, April 8, 1911. He was interred at Rock Creek Cemetery in Washington.

U.S. House of Representatives
| Preceded by William Heilman | Member of the U.S. House of Representatives from Indiana's 1st congressional district 1883-1887 | Succeeded by Alvin P. Hovey |
