= Benoni S. Fuller =

American politician

Benoni Fuller
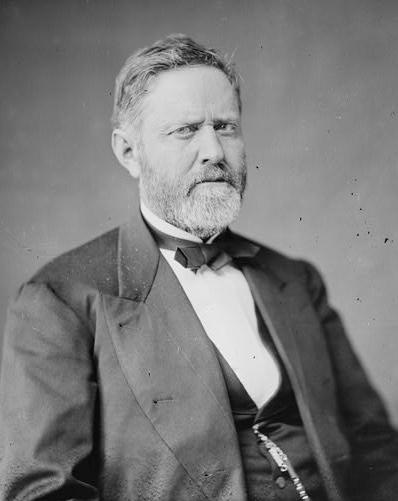

Member of the U.S. House of Representatives from Indiana's 1st district
- In office March 4, 1875 – March 3, 1879
- Preceded by: William E. Niblack
- Succeeded by: William Heilman

Member of the Indiana Senate
- In office 1862–1872

Member of the Indiana House of Representatives from the ? district
- In office 1866–1868

Personal details
- Born: November 13, 1825
- Died: April 14, 1903 (aged 77) Boonville, Indiana, U.S.
- Party: Democratic

Benoni Stinson Fuller (November 13, 1825 – April 14, 1903) was an American educator and politician who served two terms as a U.S. representative from Indiana from 1875 to 1879.

== Biography ==
Born near Boonville, Indiana, Fuller attended the common schools, and later taught school in Warrick County. He became sheriff of Warrick County in 1856 and 1858. He served in the Indiana Senate in 1862, 1870, and 1872, and served as member of the Indiana House of Representatives 1866–1868.

=== Congress ===
Fuller was elected as a Democrat to the Forty-fourth and Forty-fifth Congresses (March 4, 1875 – March 3, 1879). He was not a candidate for renomination in 1878.

=== Later career and death ===
He then engaged in agricultural pursuits in Warrick County. He died in Boonville, Indiana, April 14, 1903. He was interred in Old Boonville Cemetery.

== Electoral history ==
General election 1874
| Party | Candidate | Votes | % |
|---|---|---|---|
| Democratic | Benoni S. Fuller | 12,864 | 50.7 |
| Republican | Heilman | 12,527 | 49.3 |

General election 1876
| Party | Candidate | Votes | % |
|---|---|---|---|
| Democratic | Benoni S. Fuller | 14,727 | 50.6 |
| Republican | C. A. Debruler | 13,158 | 45.2 |

U.S. House of Representatives
| Preceded by William E. Niblack | Member of the U.S. House of Representatives from Indiana's 1st congressional district 1875–1879 | Succeeded by William Heilman |
