= George W. Cooper =

American politician (1851–1899)

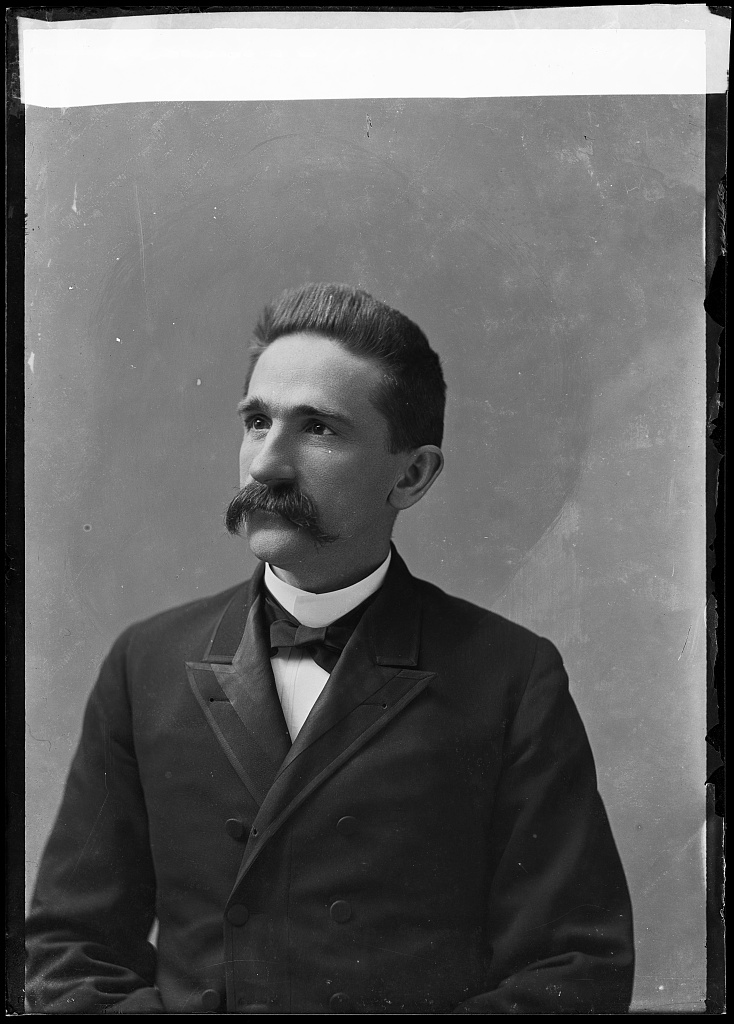
- George William Cooper photographed by C. M. Bell Studio

Member of the U.S. House of Representatives from Indiana's 5th district
- In office March 4, 1889 – March 3, 1895
- Preceded by: Courtland C. Matson
- Succeeded by: Jesse Overstreet

Personal details
- Born: George William Cooper; May 21, 1851 Columbus, Indiana, U.S.
- Died: November 27, 1899 (aged 48) Chicago, Illinois, U.S.
- Resting place: Garland Brook Cemetery in Columbus, Indiana
- Party: Democratic

George William Cooper (May 21, 1851 – November 27, 1899) was an American lawyer and politician who served three terms as a U.S. representative from Indiana from 1889 to 1895.

== Background ==
Born near Columbus, Indiana, Cooper attended the country schools, and was graduated in the academic and law courses from the Indiana University at Bloomington in 1872.

== Career ==
He was admitted to the bar and commenced practice in Columbus, Indiana.

He served as prosecuting attorney of Columbus in 1872.

He served as mayor of Columbus in 1877, and was the city attorney of Columbus from 1879 to 1883.

=== Congress ===
Cooper was elected as a Democrat to the Fifty-first, Fifty-second, and Fifty-third Congresses (March 4, 1889 – March 3, 1895). He served as chairman of the Committee on Irrigation of Arid Lands in the Fifty-third Congress.

He was an unsuccessful candidate for reelection in 1894 to the Fifty-fourth Congress.

He resumed the practice of law in Columbus, Indiana.

== Personal and death ==
He was the father of Kent Cooper of the Associated Press.

He died in Chicago, Illinois on November 27, 1899. He was interred in Garland Brook Cemetery, Columbus, Indiana.

U.S. House of Representatives
Preceded by Courtland C. Matson	Member of the U.S. House of Representatives from Indiana's 5th congressional district 1889-1895	Succeeded by Jesse Overstreet
