= 82nd Indiana Infantry Regiment =

82nd Regiment Indiana Infantry
- Active: August 30, 1862 – June 9, 1865
- Country: United States
- Allegiance: Union
- Branch: Infantry
- Engagements: Battle of Perryville; Battle of Stones River; Tullahoma Campaign; Battle of Chickamauga; Siege of Chattanooga; Battle of Missionary Ridge; Atlanta campaign Battle of Resaca; Battle of Kennesaw Mountain; Siege of Atlanta; Battle of Jonesborough; Sherman's March to the Sea; Carolinas campaign Battle of Bentonville

The 82nd Regiment Indiana Infantry was an infantry regiment that served in the Union Army during the American Civil War.

== Service ==
The 82nd Indiana Infantry was organized at Indianapolis, Indiana and mustered in for a three-year enlistment on September 8, 1862, under the command of Colonel Morton Craig Hunter.

The regiment was attached to 1st Brigade, 1st Division, Army of the Ohio, September 1862. 1st Brigade, 1st Division, III Corps, Army of the Ohio, to November 1862. 1st Brigade, 3rd Division, Center, XIV Corps, Army of the Cumberland, to January 1863. 1st Brigade, 3rd Division, XIV Corps, to June 1865.

The 82nd Indiana Infantry mustered out of service on June 9, 1865.

== Detailed service ==
Ordered to Louisville, Kentucky, September 1. Pursuit of Bragg into Kentucky October 1–15, 1862. Battle of Perryville, October 8. March to Nashville, Tennessee, October 16-November 7, and duty there until December 26. Advance on Murfreesboro December 26–30. Battle of Stones River December 30–31, 1862 and January 1–3, 1863. Duty at Murfreesboro until June. Expedition toward Columbia March 4–14. Tullahoma Campaign June 23-July 7. Hoover's Gap June 24–26. Occupation of middle Tennessee until August 16. Passage of the Cumberland Mountains and Tennessee River and Chickamauga Campaign August 16-September 22. Battle of Chickamauga September 19–21. Siege of Chattanooga, September 24-November 23. Reopening Tennessee River November 26–29. Brown's Ferry October 27. Chattanooga-Ringgold Campaign November 23–27. Orchard Knob November 23–24. Missionary Ridge November 25. Pursuit to Graysville November 26–27. Demonstrations on Dalton, Georgia, February 22–27, 1864. Tunnel Hill, Buzzard's Roost Gap and Rocky Faced Ridge February 23–25. Atlanta Campaign May 1-September 8. Demonstrations on Rocky Faced Ridge May 8–11. Battle of Resaca May 14–15. Advance on Dallas May 18–25. Operations on line of Pumpkin Vine Creek and battles about Dallas, New Hope Church, and Allatoona Hills May 25-June 5. Operations about Marietta and against Kennesaw Mountain June 10-July 2. Pine Hill June 10–14. Lost Mountain June 15–17. Assault on Kennesaw June 27. Ruff's Station, Smyrna Camp Ground, July 4. Chattahoochie River July 5–17. Peachtree Creek July 19–20. Siege of Atlanta July 22-August 25. Utoy Creek August 5–7. Flank movement on Jonesboro August 25–30. Battle of Jonesboro August 31-September 1. Lovejoy's Station September 2–6. Operations in northern Georgia and northern Alabama against Hood September 29-November 3. March to the sea November 15-December 10. Siege of Savannah December 10–21. Campaign of the Carolinas January to April 1865. Fayetteville, North Carolina, March 11. Averysboro March 16. Battle of Bentonville March 19–21. Occupation of Goldsboro March 24. Advance on Raleigh April 10–14. Occupation of Raleigh April 14. Bennett's House April 26. Surrender of Johnston and his army. March to Washington, D.C., via Richmond, Va., April 29-May 19. Grand Review of the Armies, May 24.

== Casualties ==
The regiment lost a total of 244 men during service; 3 officers and 65 enlisted men killed or mortally wounded, 6 officers and 170 enlisted men died of disease.

== Commanders ==
- Colonel Morton Craig Hunter

== See also ==
- List of Indiana Civil War regiments
- Indiana in the Civil War
