= George W. Cromer =

American politician

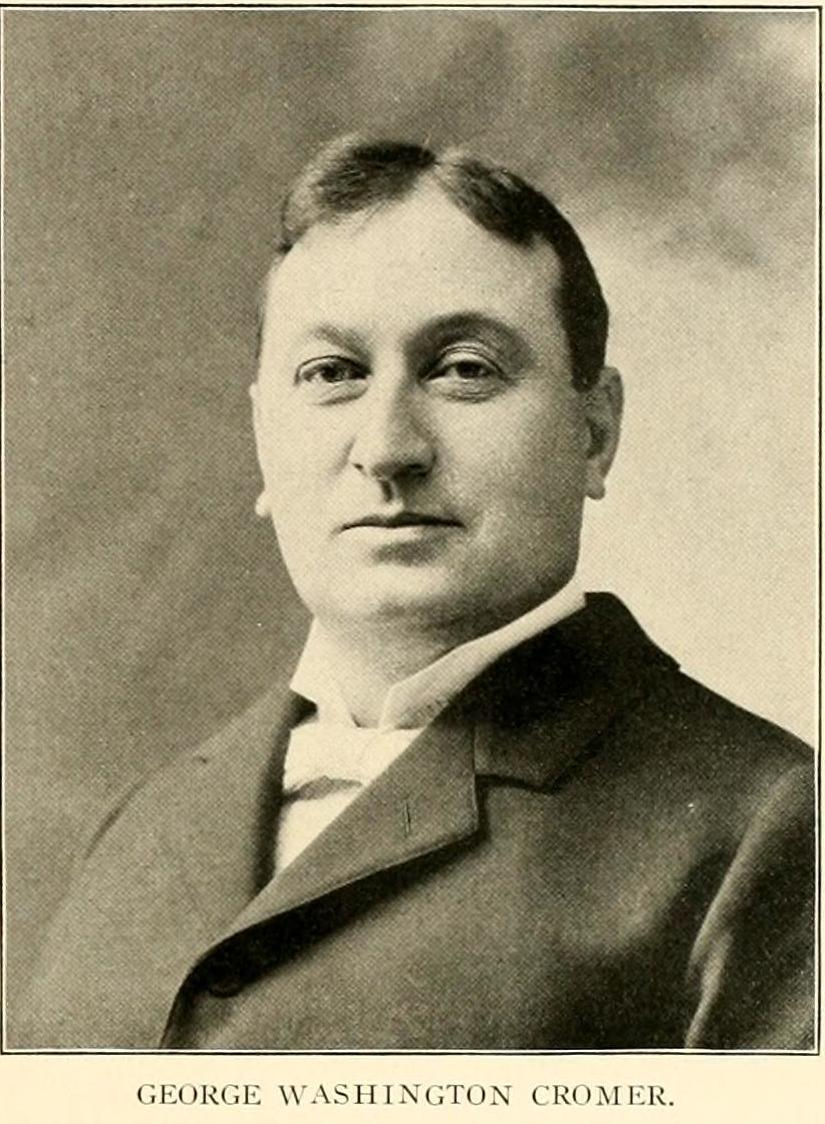
- George W. Cromer in 1899, from Men of progress, Indiana

Prosecuting Attorney of the 46th Judicial Court of Indiana
- In office 1886–1890

9th Mayor of Muncie, Indiana
- In office 1894–1898
- Preceded by: Arthur W. Brady
- Succeeded by: Edward Tuhey

Member of the U.S. House of Representatives from Indiana's 8th congressional district
- In office March 4, 1899 – March 3, 1907
- Preceded by: Charles L. Henry
- Succeeded by: John A. M. Adair

Personal details
- Born: May 13, 1856 Anderson, Indiana, United States
- Died: November 8, 1936 (aged 80) Muncie, Indiana, United States
- Party: Republican

George Washington Cromer (May 13, 1856 – November 8, 1936) was an American lawyer and politician who had four terms as a U.S. representative from Indiana from 1899 to 1907.

== Early life and education ==
Born near Anderson, Indiana, Cromer attended the common schools and Wittenberg College in Springfield, Ohio. He studied law and graduated from the Indiana University Bloomington in 1882.

== Career ==
He became editor of the Muncie Times in 1883. He was admitted to the bar in 1886 and commenced practice in Muncie, Indiana. He was prosecuting attorney for the forty-sixth judicial circuit of Indiana from 1886 to 1890, a member of the State Republican committee in 1892 and 1894, and mayor of Muncie from 1894 to 1898.

== Congress ==
Cromer was elected as a Republican to the 56th and to the three succeeding Congresses (March 4, 1899 – March 3, 1907). He was an unsuccessful candidate for re-election in 1906 to the 60th Congress.

== Later career and death ==
He resumed the practice of his profession in Muncie until his death there at the age of 80, and was interred in Beech Grove Cemetery.

U.S. House of Representatives
Preceded by Charles L. Henry	Member of the U.S. House of Representatives from Indiana's 8th congressional district March 4, 1899 – March 3, 1907	Succeeded by John A. M. Adair
