= Morton C. Hunter =

American politician

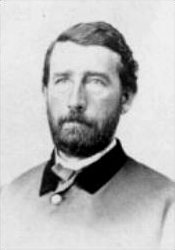

Member of the U.S. House of Representatives from Indiana
- In office March 4, 1867 – March 3, 1869
- Preceded by: Ralph Hill
- Succeeded by: William S. Holman
- Constituency: 3rd district
- In office March 4, 1873 – March 3, 1879
- Preceded by: Daniel W. Voorhees (6th); James N. Tyner (8th)
- Succeeded by: Milton S. Robinson (6th); Abraham J. Hostetler (8th)
- Constituency: 6th district (1873-75); 8th district (1875-79)

Personal details
- Born: Morton Craig Hunter; February 5, 1825 Versailles, Indiana
- Died: October 25, 1896 (aged 71) Bloomington, Indiana
- Resting place: Rose Hill Cemetery, Bloomington, Indiana

Military service
- Allegiance: United States of America; Union
- Branch/service: United States Army; Union Army
- Years of service: 1862–1865
- Rank: Colonel; Brevet Brigadier General
- Commands: 82nd Indiana Infantry; 1st Brigade, 3rd Division, XIV Corps
- Battles/wars: American Civil War

Morton Craig Hunter (February 5, 1825 – October 25, 1896) was an officer in the Union Army during the American Civil War who later became a U.S. Representative from Indiana, serving four terms between 1867 and 1879.

== Biography ==
Morton Hunter was born in Versailles, Indiana and knew the hardships of growing up in a pioneer home. His father John Hunter was a soldier in the War of 1812 and his Scottish immigrant grandfather served in the Revolutionary war. Morton Hunter graduated from the law department of Indiana University at Bloomington in 1849.

After graduating he immediately married and practiced law in Bloomington. In 1858 he was elected to represent Monroe County in the State House of Representatives.

=== Civil War ===
In the summer of 1862 in response to Lincoln's call for volunteers, he organized the 82nd Indiana Infantry. On August 27, 1862, he was commissioned a colonel by Governor Oliver Morton. At the Battle of Chickamauga when Confederate Gen. Longstreet routed the right wing of the Army of the Cumberland, Hunter on his own initiative was the first officer to form a new position on Horseshoe ridge that was to become the line that saved the army from destruction. His commanding officer John Connell wrote of Hunter's stubborn resistance on that ridge "which truly and most fortunately changed the fortunes of that disastrous day, and saved the army from worse than defeat." In the Battle of Missionary Ridge Hunter's 82nd and the 99th Ohio were the first two regiments to attack Bragg's center with orders to halt after taking the Confederate line below Missionary ridge.

Not content to be subjected to murderous fire from the high ground, the attacking units charged the ridge, and Hunter's 82nd was the first of his division to gain the summit and occupy the confederate works. The initiative of his and Ohio units collapsing Bragg's center was the pivotal moment of the battle. For his gallantry that day, Hunter received the commendation of his commanders.

He was later promoted to command his regiment's brigade (First Brigade, Third Division, Fourteenth Army Corps) under Gen. George Thomas and led his unit on Sherman's March to the Sea. On January 13 1866, President Andrew Johnson nominated Hunter for appointment to the grade of brevet brigadier general of volunteers, to rank from March 13, 1865, and the United States Senate confirmed the appointment on March 12, 1866. Hunter was mustered out of the volunteers on June 24, 1865.

=== Congress ===
Hunter was elected as a Republican to the Fortieth Congress (March 4, 1867 – March 3, 1869). After leaving office for four years, Hunter was again elected to the Forty-third, Forty-fourth, and Forty-fifth Congresses (March 4, 1873 – March 3, 1879).

=== Later career and death ===
After leaving office he operated a quarry in the Indiana limestone district.

He died in Bloomington, Indiana, October 25, 1896 and was interred in Rose Hill Cemetery.

== See also ==
- List of American Civil War generals (Union)

== Notes ==
U.S. House of Representatives
Preceded by Ralph Hill	Member of the U.S. House of Representatives from Indiana's 3rd congressional district 1867-1869	Succeeded by William S. Holman
Preceded by Daniel W. Voorhees	Member of the U.S. House of Representatives from Indiana's 6th congressional district 1873-1875	Succeeded by Milton S. Robinson
Preceded by James N. Tyner	Member of the U.S. House of Representatives from Indiana's 8th congressional district 1875-1879	Succeeded by Abraham J. Hostetler
