= Charles L. Henry =

American politician

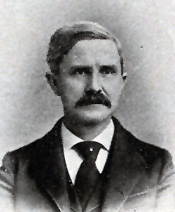

Member of the U.S. House of Representatives from Indiana
- In office March 4, 1895 – March 3, 1899
- Preceded by: William D. Bynum (7th); George W. Faris (8th)
- Succeeded by: Jesse Overstreet (7th); George W. Cromer (8th)
- Constituency: 7th district (1895-97); 8th district (1897-99)

Member of the Indiana Senate
- In office 1880-1881; 1883

Personal details
- Born: July 1, 1849 Green Township, Hancock County, Indiana, U.S.
- Died: May 2, 1927 (aged 77) Indianapolis, Indiana, U.S.
- Party: Republican
- Education: Asbury (now DePauw) University, Indiana University

Charles Lewis Henry (July 1, 1849 – May 2, 1927) was an American lawyer and politician who served two terms as a U.S. representative from Indiana from 1895 to 1899.

== Biography ==
Born in Green Township, Hancock County, Indiana, Henry moved with his parents to Pendleton, Indiana. He attended the common schools and Asbury (now DePauw) University and graduated from the law department of Indiana University at Bloomington in 1872. He was admitted to the bar and commenced practice in Pendleton, eventually moving to Anderson, Indiana in 1875. He served as a member of the state senate in 1880, 1881, and 1883.

=== Congress ===
Henry was elected as a Republican to the Fifty-fourth and Fifty-fifth Congresses (March 4, 1895 – March 3, 1899), but declined to be a candidate for renomination in 1898.

=== Later career and death ===
He was interested in the development and operation of electric interurban railways. Henry is credited with coining the phrase "interurban" (of Latin derivation meaning "between cities"). At the time of his death he was president and receiver of the Indianapolis & Cincinnati Traction Co., which he had managed for twenty-three years. He died in Indianapolis, Indiana, May 2, 1927 and is interred in Maplewood Cemetery, Anderson, Indiana.

U.S. House of Representatives
Preceded by William D. Bynum	Member of the U.S. House of Representatives from Indiana's 7th congressional district 1895–1897	Succeeded by Jesse Overstreet
Preceded by George W. Faris	Member of the U.S. House of Representatives from Indiana's 8th congressional district 1897–1899	Succeeded by George W. Cromer
