= Elias S. Holliday =

American politician

Elias S. Holiday
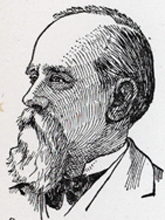

Member of the U.S. House of Representatives from Indiana's 5th district
- In office March 4, 1901 – March 4, 1909
- Preceded by: George W. Faris
- Succeeded by: Ralph Wilbur Moss

Personal details
- Born: Elias Selah Holiday; March 5, 1842 Aurora, Indiana, U.S.
- Died: March 13, 1936 (aged 94) Brazil, Indiana
- Party: Republican
- Education: Hartsville College

Military service
- Allegiance: Union Army
- Rank: First sergeant
- Unit: Fifth Kansas Regiment
- Battles/wars: American Civil War

Elias Selah Holliday (March 5, 1842 – March 13, 1936) was an American lawyer, Civil War veteran, and politician who served four terms as a U.S. representative from Indiana from 1901 to 1909.

== Early life and career ==
Born in Aurora, Indiana, Holliday spent the early part of his life on farms in Indiana, Missouri, and Iowa. He attended the common schools and taught in the public schools in Iowa.

=== Civil War ===
During the Civil War enlisted in the Fifth Kansas Regiment and served until August 12, 1864, when he was mustered out with the rank of first sergeant.

=== Legal career ===
He attended Hartsville College, Bartholomew County, Indiana. He engaged in teaching in Jennings County, Indiana. He studied law at Mount Vernon, Indiana. He was admitted to the bar in 1873 and commenced practice in Carbon, Indiana.

== Political career ==
He moved to Brazil, Indiana, in 1874. He served as mayor of Brazil 1877–1880, 1887, and 1888. City attorney in 1884. He served as member of the city council 1892–1896.

=== Congress ===
Holliday was elected as a Republican to the Fifty-seventh and to the three succeeding Congresses (March 4, 1901 – March 3, 1909). He was not a candidate for renomination in 1908. Reengaged in the practice of law in Brazil, Indiana until 1922.

== Death ==
He died in Brazil, Indiana, March 13, 1936. He was interred in Cottage Hill Cemetery.

U.S. House of Representatives
Preceded by George W. Faris	Member of the U.S. House of Representatives from Indiana's 5th congressional district 1901-1909	Succeeded by Ralph W. Moss
