= D. Bailey Merrill =

American politician (1912–1993)

Member of the U.S. House of Representatives from Indiana's 8th district
- In office January 3, 1953 – January 3, 1955
- Preceded by: Winfield K. Denton
- Succeeded by: Winfield K. Denton

Personal details
- Born: November 22, 1912 Hymera, Indiana, U.S.
- Died: October 14, 1993 (aged 80) Evansville, Indiana, U.S
- Party: Republican
- Education: Indiana State Teachers College; Indiana University School of Law - Bloomington

Military service
- Allegiance: United States of America
- Branch/service: United States Army
- Years of service: 1942–1946
- Rank: Captain
- Unit: Two Hundredth and the 91st Field Artillery Observation Battalion; European Theater of Operations, United States Army
- Battles/wars: World War II

D. Bailey Merrill (November 22, 1912 – October 14, 1993) was an American lawyer and politician who served one term as a U.S. representative from Indiana from 1953 to 1955.

== Biography ==
Born in Hymera, Indiana, Merrill graduated from Indiana State Teachers College, Terre Haute, Indiana in 1933. He graduated from Indiana University School of Law - Bloomington, Indiana in 1937. He was a high school teacher in Hymera from 1933 to 1935 and became a lawyer in private practice.

He joined the United States Army in 1942 as a private in field artillery and rose to the rank of captain upon release in March 1946. He served with the Two Hundredth and the 91st Field Artillery Observation Battalion in the European Theater of Operations in World War II.

=== Congress ===
Merrill was elected as a Republican to the Eighty-third Congress (January 3, 1953 – January 3, 1955). He was an unsuccessful candidate for reelection in 1954 to the Eighty-fourth Congress and for election in 1956 to the Eighty-fifth Congress.

=== Death ===
He died on October 14, 1993, in Evansville, Indiana. He was interred in Alexander Memorial Park, Evansville, Indiana.

U.S. House of Representatives
Preceded by Winfield K. Denton	Member of the U.S. House of Representatives from Indiana's 8th congressional district 1953–1955	Succeeded by Winfield K. Denton
