= Abraham J. Hostetler =

American politician (1818–1899)

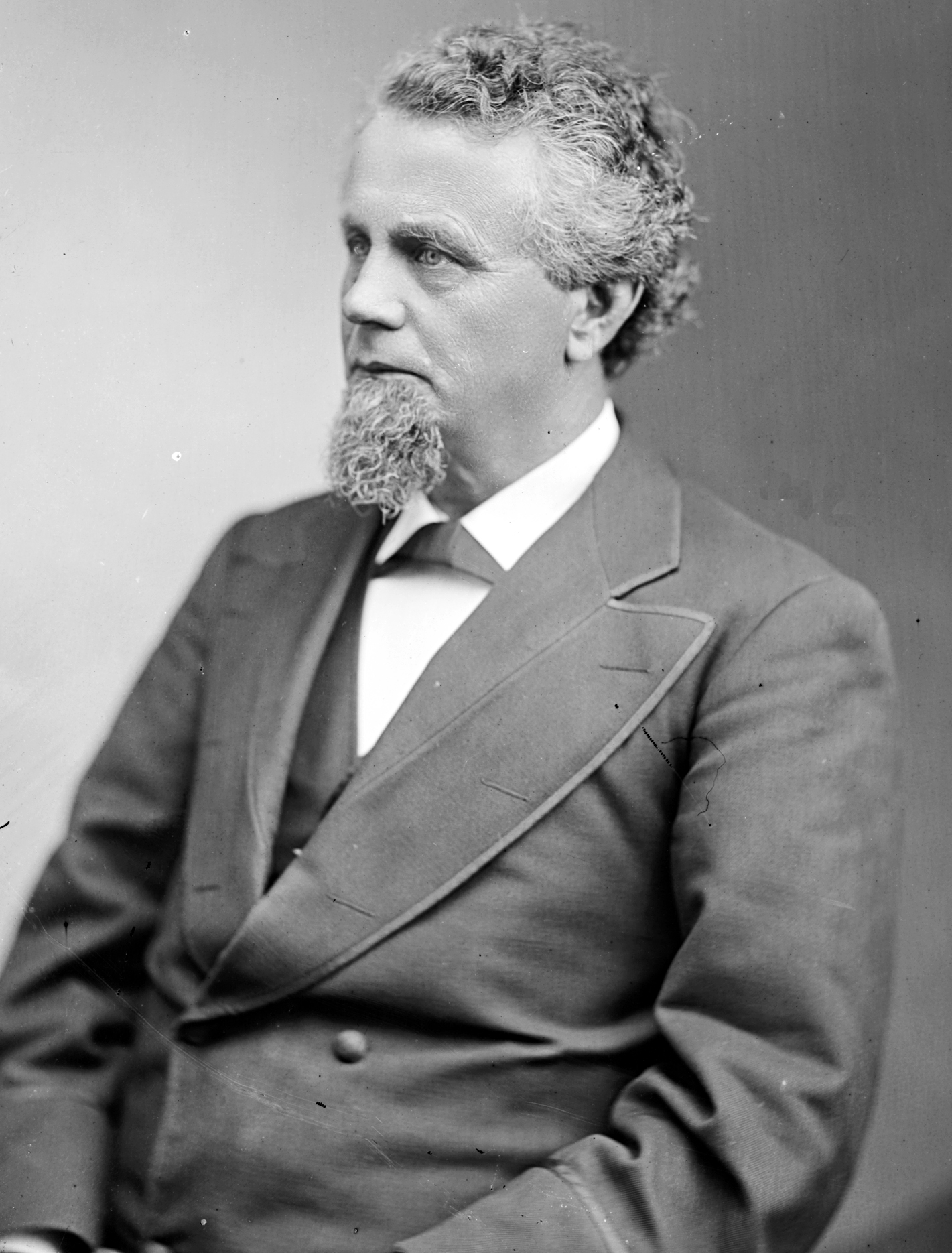
- Portrait of Hostetler by Mathew Brady, between 1865 and 1880

Member of the U.S. House of Representatives from Indiana's 8th district
- In office March 4, 1879 – March 3, 1881
- Preceded by: Morton C. Hunter
- Succeeded by: Robert B. F. Peirce

Member of the Indiana Senate
- In office 1854–1858

Personal details
- Born: November 22, 1818 Washington County, Indiana, US
- Died: November 24, 1899 (aged 81) Bedford, Indiana, US
- Party: Democratic
- Occupation: Politician

Abraham Jonathan Hostetler (or Abram; November 22, 1818 – November 24, 1899) was an American politician. A Democrat, he was a member of the United States House of Representatives from Indiana.

== Biography ==
Hostetler was born on November 22, 1818, in Washington County, Indiana, the son of Johnathan Hostetler and Sarah (née Ribble) Hostetler. He and his family moved to Lawrence County, Indiana shortly after his birth. He was orphaned at a young age. He was educated at local common schools. In 1837, he began apprenticing under a blacksmith in Decatur, Illinois. In 1854, he became a farmer, and in 1865, became a merchant.

Hostetler was a Democrat. From 1854 to 1858, he was a member of the Indiana Senate. He was a member of the United States House of Representatives, from March 4, 1879, to March 3, 1881, representing Indiana's 8th district. He lost the following election. He was a delegate to the 1880 Democratic National Convention. Ideologically, he leaned liberal.

After serving in Congress, Hostetler returned to merchantry. Also a newspaperman, he was the editor of The Bedford Banner for several years. In February 1842, he married Margaret Newland, with whom he had four children. He was Christian. He died on November 24, 1899, aged 81, in Pinhook, Lawrence County, from a stroke. He was buried at Leatherwood Church Cemetery, in Bedford.

U.S. House of Representatives
Preceded by Morton C. Hunter	Member of the U.S. House of Representatives from Indiana's 8th congressional district March 4, 1879 – March 3, 1881	Succeeded by Robert B. F. Peirce
