= E. A. Mitchell =

American politician (1910–1979)

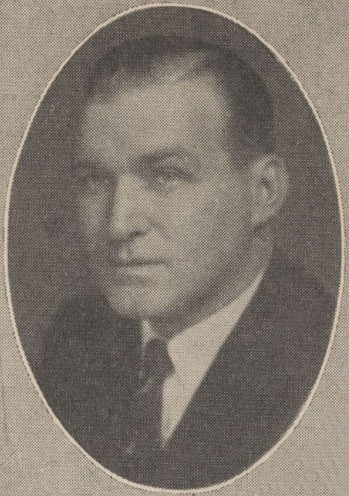
- Mitchell in 1947

Member of the U.S. House of Representatives from Indiana's 8th district
- In office January 3, 1947 – January 3, 1949
- Preceded by: Charles M. La Follette
- Succeeded by: Winfield K. Denton

Personal details
- Born: December 2, 1910 Binghamton, New York, U.S.
- Died: December 11, 1979 (aged 69) Evansville, Indiana, U.S
- Party: Republican
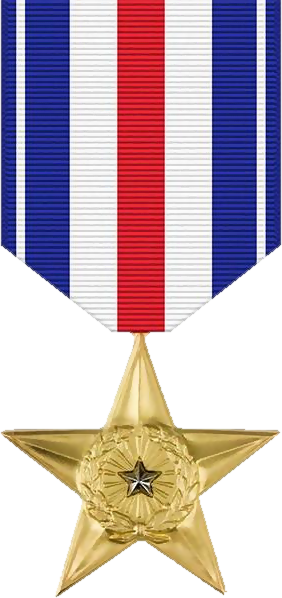
- Awards: Silver Star

Military service
- Allegiance: United States of America
- Branch/service: United States Navy
- Rank: Lieutenant commander
- Battles/wars: World War II

Edward Archibald Mitchell (December 2, 1910 – December 11, 1979) was an American businessman and World War II veteran who served as one term a U.S. Representative from Indiana from 1947 to 1949.

== Early life and career ==
Born in Binghamton, New York, Mitchell attended the Binghamton schools and had three years of college training at the American Law Institute and Columbia University, New York City. He moved to Evansville, Indiana, in September 1937.

He engaged as a warehouseman and later as district manager for a large food distributor 1934–1937. In 1937 Mitchell purchased a half interest in a food marketing and brokerage company and served as president. At age twenty-seven after purchasing part of the company he had accumulated a net worth of over one million dollars which with inflation would be around $15 million.

== World War II ==
Following his success in the food service industry he served in the United States Navy from November 1942 until his discharge as a lieutenant commander in January 1946, having been commanding officer of Underwater Demolition Teams in the Pacific Theater for two years. He was awarded the Silver Star Medal at Okinawa following his honourable discharge.

== Congress ==
Mitchell was elected as a Republican to the Eightieth Congress (January 3, 1947 – January 3, 1949). The incumbent Republican sought, unsuccessfully, the nomination to the U.S. Senate. Mitchell was defeated for reelection in 1948 to the Eighty-first Congress by the Democrat he had beaten in 1946.

== Late career ==
He served as delegate in 1952 and 1956 to Republican National Conventions. In March 1971 Mitchell, who was sixty at the time, knocked House Majority Leader Hale Boggs, 57, to the floor in the men's room of the Statler Hilton during the Gridiron Dinner. Mitchell complained that Boggs' comments on the skits lampooning the Nixon Administration were too loud and too Democratic.

== Death ==
Mitchell resided in Evansville, Indiana, where he died December 11, 1979. He was interred in Sunset Memorial Park.

U.S. House of Representatives
Preceded by Charles M. La Follette	Member of the U.S. House of Representatives from Indiana's 8th congressional district 1947–1949	Succeeded by Winfield K. Denton
