= Charles M. La Follette =

American politician (1898–1974)

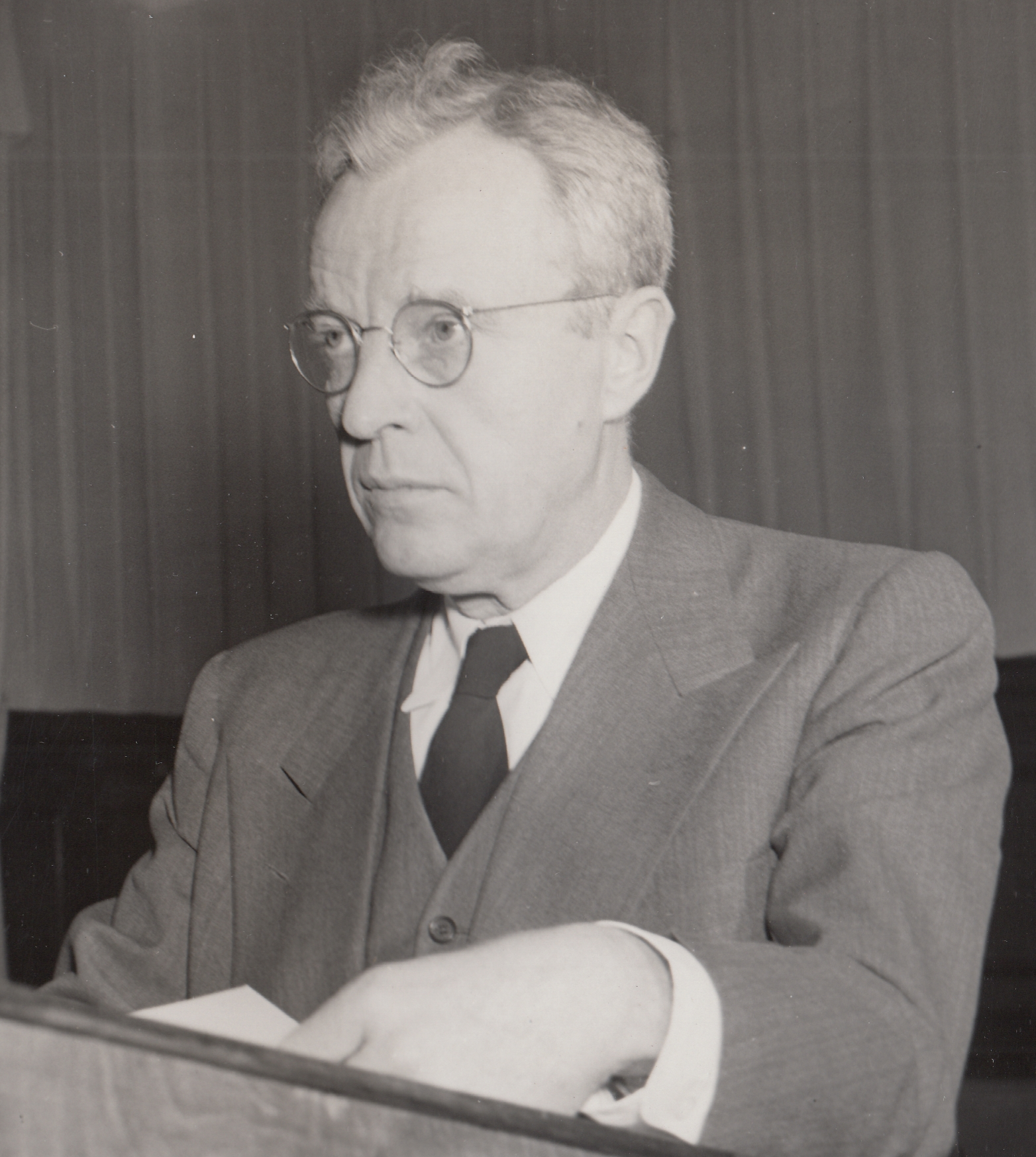
- LaFollette leading the prosecution in the Judges' Trial

Member of the U.S. House of Representatives from Indiana's 8th district
- In office January 3, 1943 – January 3, 1947
- Preceded by: John W. Boehne Jr.
- Succeeded by: E. A. Mitchell

Member of the Indiana House of Representatives
- In office 1927–1929

Personal details
- Born: Charles Marion La Follette; February 27, 1898 New Albany, Indiana, U.S.
- Died: June 27, 1974 (aged 76) Trenton, New Jersey, U.S.
- Resting place: Locust Hill Cemetery Evansville, Indiana, U.S.
- Party: Republican
- Spouse: Frances Hartmetz
- Children: 2 daughters
- Education: Vanderbilt University Law School

Charles Marion La Follette (February 27, 1898 – June 27, 1974) was an American lawyer and politician.

His great-grandfather was William Heilman, who was in the United States House of Representatives from Indiana.

He served as a Republican in the United States House of Representatives during the 1940s and took part in the post-World War II Nuremberg Trials.

== Early life and career ==
During World War I, La Follette was in the United States Army from 1917 to 1919, where he served in the 151st Infantry Regiment of the 38th Infantry Division.

After his military service, La Follette studied law at Vanderbilt University in Nashville, Tennessee, and was admitted to the Indiana State Bar Association in 1925. He set up practice in Evansville, Indiana.

== Congress ==
La Follette served as a Republican in the Indiana House of Representatives from 1927 to 1929, and in the United States House of Representatives from 1943 to 1947.

In 1947 he served as deputy chief of counsel for war crimes in the Nuremberg Trials.

== After Congress ==
La Follette then served as the director of Americans for Democratic Action from 1949 to 1950, and served on the Subversive Activities Control Board from 1950 to 1951.

He was a third cousin of Robert M. La Follette Jr. and Philip La Follette.

He died in Trenton, New Jersey, on June 27, 1974. His body was cremated and the ashes interred at Locust Hill Cemetery in Evansville, Indiana.

U.S. House of Representatives
Preceded by John W. Boehne Jr.	Member of the U.S. House of Representatives from Indiana's 8th congressional district 1943–1947	Succeeded by E. A. Mitchell
