= Elijah V. Brookshire =

American politician (1856–1936)

Elijah Brookshire
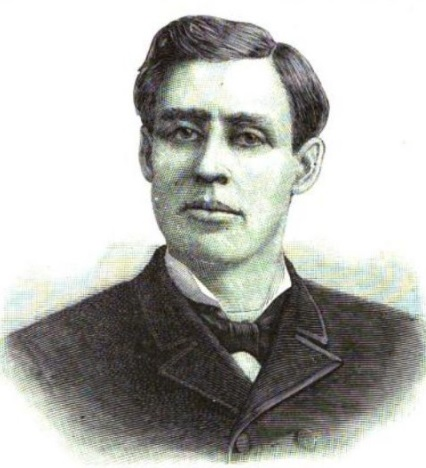
- From 1894's The History of the Democratic Party from Thomas Jefferson to Grover Cleveland

Member of the U.S. House of Representatives from Indiana's 8th district
- In office March 4, 1889 – March 3, 1895
- Preceded by: James T. Johnston
- Succeeded by: George W. Faris

Personal details
- Born: Elijah Voorhees Brookshire; August 15, 1856 Ladoga, Indiana
- Died: April 14, 1936 (aged 79) Seattle, Washington
- Party: Democratic
- Education: Central Indiana Normal College
- Profession: Lawyer

Elijah Voorhees Brookshire (August 15, 1856 – April 14, 1936) was an American lawyer and politician who served three terms as a U.S. representative from Indiana from 1889 to 1895.

== Early life ==
Born near Ladoga, Indiana, Brookshire attended the common schools, and was graduated from Central Indiana Normal College at Ladoga in August 1878.

He taught in the common schools of Montgomery County, Indiana from 1879 to 1882 and he also engaged in agricultural pursuits. After studying law, he was admitted to the bar in 1883 and commenced practice in Crawfordsville the same year. He married Amanda Harshbarger in 1883.

== Career ==
=== Congress ===
Brookshire was elected as a Democrat to the Fifty-first, Fifty-second, and Fifty-third Congresses (March 4, 1889 – March 3, 1895). He was an unsuccessful candidate for reelection in 1894 to the Fifty-fourth Congress.

=== Later career ===
He resumed the practice of law in Washington, D.C., and was admitted to practice before the United States Supreme Court in 1894. He moved to Los Angeles, California, in 1925, and to Seattle, Washington, in 1935, having retired from active law practice in 1925.

== Death ==
He died in Seattle, Washington, April 14, 1936 and was interred in Harshbarger Cemetery, near Ladoga, Indiana.

U.S. House of Representatives
Preceded by James T. Johnston	Member of the U.S. House of Representatives from Indiana's 8th congressional district March 4, 1889 – March 3, 1895	Succeeded by George W. Faris
