= Robert B. F. Peirce =

American politician

Robert Peirce
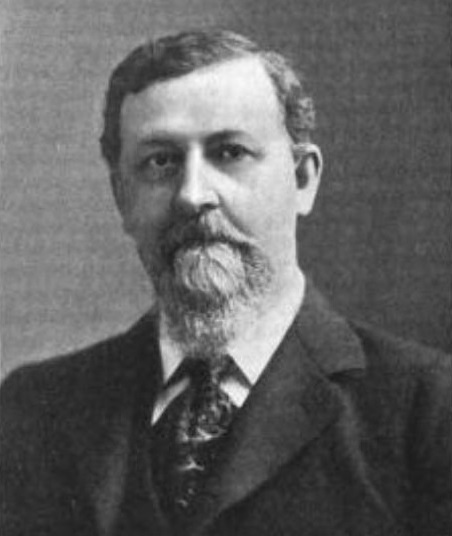

Member of the U.S. House of Representatives from Indiana's 8th district
- In office March 4, 1881 – March 3, 1883
- Preceded by: Abraham J. Hostetler
- Succeeded by: John E. Lamb

Personal details
- Born: February 17, 1843 Laurel, Indiana, U.S.
- Died: December 5, 1898 (aged 55) Indianapolis, Indiana, U.S
- Party: Republican
- Education: Wabash College

Military service
- Branch/service: U.S. Army (Union Army)
- Rank: 2nd Lieutenant
- Commands: Company H; One Hundred and Thirty-fifth Regiment; Indiana Volunteers
- Battles/wars: American Civil War

Robert Bruce Fraser Peirce (February 17, 1843 – December 5, 1898) was an American lawyer, Civil War veteran and politician who served one term as a U.S. representative from Indiana from 1881 to 1883.

== Early life and career ==
Born in Laurel, Indiana, Peirce attended the public schools and was also educated by private tutors.

=== Civil War ===
He served in the Civil War as second lieutenant of Company H, One Hundred and Thirty-fifth Regiment, Indiana Volunteers.

=== Legal career ===
He graduated from Wabash College, Crawfordsville, Indiana, in 1866 and studied law at Shelbyville, Indiana. He was admitted to the bar in 1866 and commenced practice in Crawfordsville in 1867.

== Congress ==
Peirce was elected prosecuting attorney of Montgomery County in 1868 and reelected in 1870 and 1872. He was then elected as a Republican to the Forty-seventh Congress (March 4, 1881 – March 3, 1883). He was an unsuccessful candidate for reelection in 1882 to the Forty-eighth Congress.

== Later career and death ==
He resumed the practice of law, and was appointed receiver for the Toledo, St. Louis and Western Railroad.

He died in Indianapolis, Indiana, and was interred in Oak Hill Cemetery, Crawfordsville, Indiana.

U.S. House of Representatives
Preceded by Abraham J. Hostetler	Member of the U.S. House of Representatives from Indiana's 8th congressional district March 4, 1881 – March 3, 1883	Succeeded by John E. Lamb
