= Indiana's 8th congressional district =

U.S. House district for Indiana

- Interactive map of district boundaries since January 3, 2023
- Representative: Mark Messmer; R–Jasper
- Area: 7,041.64 mi^{2} (18,237.8 km^{2})
- Distribution: 58.10% urban; 41.90% rural
- Population (2025): 762,792
- Median household income: $67,091
- Ethnicity: 87.7% White; 4.0% Black; 3.6% Two or more races; 3.1% Hispanic; 1.0% Asian; 0.6% other
- Cook PVI: R+18

Indiana's 8th congressional district is a congressional district in the U.S. state of Indiana. Based in southwest and west central Indiana, the district is anchored in Evansville and also includes Jasper, Princeton, Terre Haute, Vincennes, and Washington.

Previously referred to as "The Bloody Eighth" at the local (and sometimes national) levels, it was formerly a notorious swing district. However, due to a political realignment, it has become a safe Republican district and, with a Cook Partisan Voting Index rating of R+18, is now the most Republican district in Indiana.

== Recent election results from statewide races ==
Year	Office	Results
2008	President	McCain 50% - 48%
2012	President	Romney 60% - 40%
2012	Senate	Donnelly 48% - 47%
2012	Governor	Gregg 49% - 48%
2016	President	Trump 64% - 30%
2016	Senate	Young 54% - 41%
2016	Governor	Holcomb 53% - 45%
2016	Attorney General	Hill 66% - 34%
2018	Senate	Braun 58% - 38%
2020	President	Trump 65% - 33%
2020	Governor	Holcomb 65% - 25%
2020	Attorney General	Rokita 61% - 39%
2022	Senate	Young 68% - 30%
2022	Treasurer	Elliott 67% - 33%
2022	Auditor	Klutz 67% - 30%
2022	Secretary of State	Morales 63% - 33%
2024	President	Trump 67% - 31%
2024	Senate	Banks 66% - 31%
2024	Governor	Braun 62% - 33%
2024	Attorney General	Rokita 67% - 33%

== Composition ==
For the 118th and successive Congresses (based on redistricting following the 2020 census), the district contains all or portions of the following counties and townships:

Clay County (11)

All 11 townships

Crawford County (9)

All nine townships

Daviess County (15)

All 15 townships

Dubois County (12)

All 12 townships

Fountain County (7)

Cain (part, also 4th), Fulton, Jackson, Millcreek, Troy (part, also 4th; includes Covington), Van Buren, Wabash

Gibson County (10)

All 10 townships

Greene County (15)

All 15 townships

Knox County (10)

All 10 townships

Martin County (6)

All six townships

Orange County (10)

All 10 townships

Owen County (13)

All 13 townships

Parke County (13)

All 13 townships

Perry County (7)

All seven townships

Pike County (9)

All nine townships

Posey County (10)

All 10 townships

Spencer County (9)

All nine townships

Sullivan County (9)

All nine townships

Vanderburgh County (8)

All eight townships

Vermillion County (5)

All five townships

Vigo County (12)

All 12 townships

Warrick County (10)

All 10 townships

== History ==
Based in Evansville, the 8th congressional district was widened when Indiana lost a seat after the 2000 U.S. census to include much of the former 5th and 7th congressional districts. At that time, Bloomington (the home of former U.S. Representative Frank McCloskey) was moved into the 9th congressional district, while the 8th congressional district was extended northward to include much of the former 7th congressional district in west-central Indiana, including Terre Haute. As a result of this expansion, the district is the largest in area in Indiana with all or part of 18 counties.

The district has been nicknamed "The Bloody Eighth" because of a series of hard-fought campaigns and political reversals. Unlike most other districts in the state, which tend to give their representatives long tenures in Washington, the 8th congressional district has a reputation for frequently ousting incumbents from both parties. Since 1983, no one has held the seat or its predecessors for longer than 12 years. Voters in the district ousted six incumbents from 1966 to 1982. The election in 1984 was so close that the House of Representatives itself determined which of two candidates to seat, accepting the recommendation of the Democratic-controlled House task force sent to Indiana to count the ballots. Democratic incumbent Frank McCloskey ultimately won by a margin of four votes out of 233,000 cast. After that, McCloskey was reelected four more times before losing to Republican John Hostettler in 1994, amid the Republican Revolution. Hostettler represented the district for six terms before being defeated in a landslide by moderate Democrat Brad Ellsworth, former sheriff of Vanderburgh County, in 2006. It was the first district picked up by the Democrats that year, and was one of thirty nationwide that they gained while regaining control of the House. Ellsworth ran unsuccessfully for U.S. Senate in 2010 and was succeeded by Republican Larry Bucshon in the same election cycle and has since become the first representative of the district to surpass six terms. Although Southern Indiana is ancestrally Democratic, the Democrats in this area are nowhere near as liberal as their counterparts in the rest of the state. Historically, it had a character similar to Yellow Dog Democrat districts in neighboring Kentucky. The district also has a strong tint of social conservatism.

In 2000, a New York Times reporter said of the district: "With a populist streak and a conservative bent, this district does not cotton to country club Republicans or to social-engineering liberals," and also said, "More than 95 percent white and about 41 percent rural, the region shares much of the flavor of the Bible Belt."

In 2013, the district shifted and was pushed southward toward Evansville, losing Fountain and Warren Counties, and gaining Dubois, Perry, and Spencer Counties, and a portion of Crawford County, uniting southwestern Indiana under one district.

In 2023, the district regained some its former territory, pushing back into Fountain County, but also gained the remainder of Crawford County and the entirety of Orange County from the 9th District.

== List of members representing the district ==
Representative	Party	Years	Cong ress	Electoral history
District created March 4, 1843
John Pettit (Lafayette)	Democratic	March 4, 1843 – March 3, 1849	28th 29th 30th	Elected in 1843. Re-elected in 1845. Re-elected in 1847. Lost renomination.
Joseph E. McDonald (Crawfordsville)	Democratic	March 4, 1849 – March 3, 1851	31st	Elected in 1849. Retired.
Daniel Mace (Lafayette)	Democratic	March 4, 1851 – March 3, 1855	32nd 33rd 34th	Elected in 1851. Re-elected in 1852. Re-elected in 1854. Retired.
Daniel Mace (Lafayette)	People's	March 4, 1855 – March 3, 1857	32nd 33rd 34th	Elected in 1851. Re-elected in 1852. Re-elected in 1854. Retired.
James Wilson (Crawfordsville)	Republican	March 4, 1857 – March 3, 1861	35th 36th	Elected in 1856. Re-elected in 1858. Retired.
Albert S. White (Stockwell)	Republican	March 4, 1861 – March 3, 1863	37th	Elected in 1860. Retired.
Godlove S. Orth (Lafayette)	Republican	March 4, 1863 – March 3, 1869	38th 39th 40th	Elected in 1862. Re-elected in 1864. Re-elected in 1866. Redistricted to the 7th district.
James N. Tyner (Peru)	Republican	March 4, 1869 – March 3, 1875	41st 42nd 43rd	Elected to the term left vacant by the resignation of Representative-elect Daniel D. Pratt. Re-elected in 1870. Re-elected in 1872. Lost renomination.
Morton C. Hunter (Bloomington)	Republican	March 4, 1875 – March 3, 1879	44th 45th	Redistricted from the 6th district and re-elected in 1874. Re-elected in 1876. Lost re-election.
Abraham J. Hostetler (Bedford)	Democratic	March 4, 1879 – March 3, 1881	46th	Elected in 1878. Retired.
Robert B. F. Peirce (Crawfordsville)	Republican	March 4, 1881 – March 3, 1883	47th	Elected in 1880. Lost re-election.
John E. Lamb (Terre Haute)	Democratic	March 4, 1883 – March 3, 1885	48th	Elected in 1882. Lost re-election.
James T. Johnston (Rockville)	Republican	March 4, 1885 – March 3, 1889	49th 50th	Elected in 1884. Re-elected in 1886. Lost re-election.
Elijah V. Brookshire (Crawfordsville)	Democratic	March 4, 1889 – March 3, 1895	51st 52nd 53rd	Elected in 1888. Re-elected in 1890. Re-elected in 1892. Lost re-election.
George W. Faris (Terre Haute)	Republican	March 4, 1895 – March 3, 1897	54th	Elected in 1894. Redistricted to the 5th district.
Charles L. Henry (Anderson)	Republican	March 4, 1897 – March 3, 1899	55th	Redistricted from the 7th district and re-elected in 1896. Retired.
George W. Cromer (Muncie)	Republican	March 4, 1899 – March 3, 1907	56th 57th 58th 59th	Elected in 1898. Re-elected in 1900. Re-elected in 1902. Re-elected in 1904. Lost re-election.
John A. M. Adair (Portland)	Democratic	March 4, 1907 – March 3, 1917	60th 61st 62nd 63rd 64th	Elected in 1906. Re-elected in 1908. Re-elected in 1910. Re-elected in 1912. Re-elected in 1914. Retired to run for Governor of Indiana.
Albert H. Vestal (Anderson)	Republican	March 4, 1917 – April 1, 1932	65th 66th 67th 68th 69th 70th 71st 72nd	Elected in 1916. Re-elected in 1918. Re-elected in 1920. Re-elected in 1922. Re-elected in 1924. Re-elected in 1926. Re-elected in 1928. Re-elected in 1930. Died.
Vacant		April 1, 1932 – March 3, 1933	72nd	
John W. Boehne Jr. (Evansville)	Democratic	March 4, 1933 – January 3, 1943	73rd 74th 75th 76th 77th	Redistricted from the 1st district and re-elected in 1932. Re-elected in 1934. Re-elected in 1936. Re-elected in 1938. Re-elected in 1940. Lost re-election.
Charles M. La Follette (Evansville)	Republican	January 3, 1943 – January 3, 1947	78th 79th	Elected in 1942. Re-elected in 1944. Retired to run for U.S. Senator.
E. A. Mitchell (Evansville)	Republican	January 3, 1947 – January 3, 1949	80th	Elected in 1946. Lost re-election.
Winfield K. Denton (Evansville)	Democratic	January 3, 1949 – January 3, 1953	81st 82nd	Elected in 1948. Re-elected in 1950. Lost re-election.
D. Bailey Merrill (Evansville)	Republican	January 3, 1953 – January 3, 1955	83rd	Elected in 1952. Lost re-election.
Winfield K. Denton (Evansville)	Democratic	January 3, 1955 – December 30, 1966	84th 85th 86th 87th 88th 89th	Elected in 1954. Re-elected in 1956. Re-elected in 1958. Re-elected in 1960. Re-elected in 1962. Re-elected in 1964. Lost re-election and resigned early.
Vacant		December 30, 1966 – January 3, 1967	89th	
Roger H. Zion (Evansville)	Republican	January 3, 1967 – January 3, 1975	90th 91st 92nd 93rd	Elected in 1966. Re-elected in 1968. Re-elected in 1970. Re-elected in 1972. Lost re-election.
Philip H. Hayes (Evansville)	Democratic	January 3, 1975 – January 3, 1977	94th	Elected in 1974. Retired to run for U.S. Senator.
David L. Cornwell (Paoli)	Democratic	January 3, 1977 – January 3, 1979	95th	Elected in 1976. Lost re-election.
H. Joel Deckard (Evansville)	Republican	January 3, 1979 – January 3, 1983	96th 97th	Elected in 1978. Re-elected in 1980. Lost re-election.
Frank McCloskey (Bloomington)	Democratic	January 3, 1983 – January 3, 1985	98th	Elected in 1982. Seat left vacant while election contest resolved.
Vacant		January 3, 1985 – May 1, 1985	99th	Election contested and the House of Representatives refused to seat anyone.
Frank McCloskey (Smithville)	Democratic	May 1, 1985 – January 3, 1995	99th 100th 101st 102nd 103rd	Re-elected in 1985. Re-elected in 1986. Re-elected in 1988. Re-elected in 1990. Re-elected in 1992; Lost re-election.
John Hostettler (Blairsville)	Republican	January 3, 1995 – January 3, 2007	104th 105th 106th 107th 108th 109th	Elected in 1994. Re-elected in 1996. Re-elected in 1998. Re-elected in 2000. Re-elected in 2002. Re-elected in 2004. Lost re-election.
Brad Ellsworth (Evansville)	Democratic	January 3, 2007 – January 3, 2011	110th 111th	Elected in 2006. Re-elected in 2008. Retired to run for U.S. Senator.
Larry Bucshon (Evansville)	Republican	January 3, 2011 – January 3, 2025	112th 113th 114th 115th 116th 117th 118th	Elected in 2010. Re-elected in 2012. Re-elected in 2014. Re-elected in 2016. Re-elected in 2018. Re-elected in 2020. Re-elected in 2022. Retired.
Mark Messmer (Jasper)	Republican	January 3, 2025– present	119th	Elected in 2024. Re-elected in 2026.

== Election results ==
=== 2002 ===
Indiana's 8th Congressional District election (2002)
Party	Candidate	Votes	%
Republican	John Hostettler*	98,952	51.31
Democratic	Bryan Hartke	88,763	46.02
Libertarian	Pam Williams	5,150	2.67
Total votes		192,865	100.00
Turnout			
Republican hold			

=== 2004 ===
Indiana's 8th Congressional District election (2004)
Party	Candidate	Votes	%
Republican	John Hostettler*	145,576	53.37
Democratic	Jon Jennings	121,522	44.55
Libertarian	Mark Garvin	5,680	2.08
Total votes		272,778	100.00
Turnout			
Republican hold			

=== 2006 ===
Indiana's 8th Congressional District election (2006)
Party	Candidate	Votes	%
Democratic	Brad Ellsworth	131,019	61.02
Republican	John Hostettler*	83,704	38.98
Total votes		214,723	100.00
Turnout			
Democratic gain from Republican			

=== 2008 ===
Indiana's 8th Congressional District election (2008)
Party	Candidate	Votes	%
Democratic	Brad Ellsworth*	189,109	64.75
Republican	Greg Goode	102,940	35.25
Total votes		292,049	100.00
Turnout			
Democratic hold			

=== 2010 ===
Indiana's 8th Congressional District election (2010)
Party	Candidate	Votes	%
Republican	Larry Bucshon	117,259	57.55
Democratic	Trent Van Haaften	76,265	37.43
Libertarian	John Cunningham	10,240	5.03
Total votes		203,764	100.00
Turnout			
Republican gain from Democratic			

=== 2012 ===
Indiana's 8th Congressional District election (2012)
Party	Candidate	Votes	%
Republican	Larry Bucshon*	151,533	53.36
Democratic	Dave Crooks	122,325	43.07
Libertarian	Bart Gadau	10,134	3.57
Total votes		283,992	100.00
Turnout			
Republican hold			

=== 2014 ===
Indiana's 8th Congressional District election, 2014
Party	Candidate	Votes	%
Republican	Larry Bucshon (Incumbent)	103,344	60.32
Democratic	Tom Spangler	61,384	35.83
Libertarian	Andrew Horning	6,587	3.84
Total votes		171,315	100
Republican hold			

=== 2016 ===
Indiana's 8th Congressional District election, 2016
Party	Candidate	Votes	%
Republican	Larry Bucshon (Incumbent)	187,702	63.69
Democratic	Ronald L. Drake	93,356	31.68
Libertarian	Andrew Horning	13,655	4.63
Total votes		294,713	100
Republican hold			

=== 2018 ===
Indiana's 8th Congressional District election, 2018
Party	Candidate	Votes	%
Republican	Larry Bucshon (Incumbent)	157,396	64.4
Democratic	William Tanoos	86,895	35.6
Total votes		244,291	100
Republican hold			

=== 2020 ===
Indiana's 8th congressional district, 2020
Party	Candidate	Votes	%
Republican	Larry Bucshon (incumbent)	214,643	66.9
Democratic	Thomasina Marsili	95,691	29.8
Libertarian	James D. Rodenberger	10,283	3.2
Total votes		320,617	100.0
Republican hold			

=== 2022 ===
2022 Indiana's 8th congressional district election
Party	Candidate	Votes	%
Republican	Larry Bucshon (incumbent)	141,995	65.7
Democratic	Ray McCormick	68,109	31.5
Libertarian	Andrew Horning	5,936	2.7
Total votes		216,040	100.0
Republican hold			

=== 2024 ===
Indiana's 8th Congressional District election, 2024
Party	Candidate	Votes	%
Republican	Mark Messmer	219,941	68.0
Democratic	Erik Hurt	95,311	29.5
Libertarian	Richard Fitzlaff	8,381	2.6
Total votes		323,633	100
Republican hold			

== Historical district boundaries ==
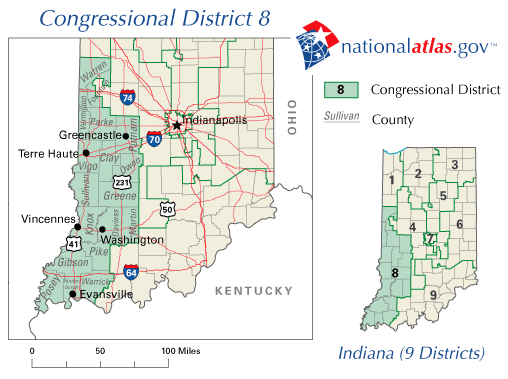
2003 – 2013

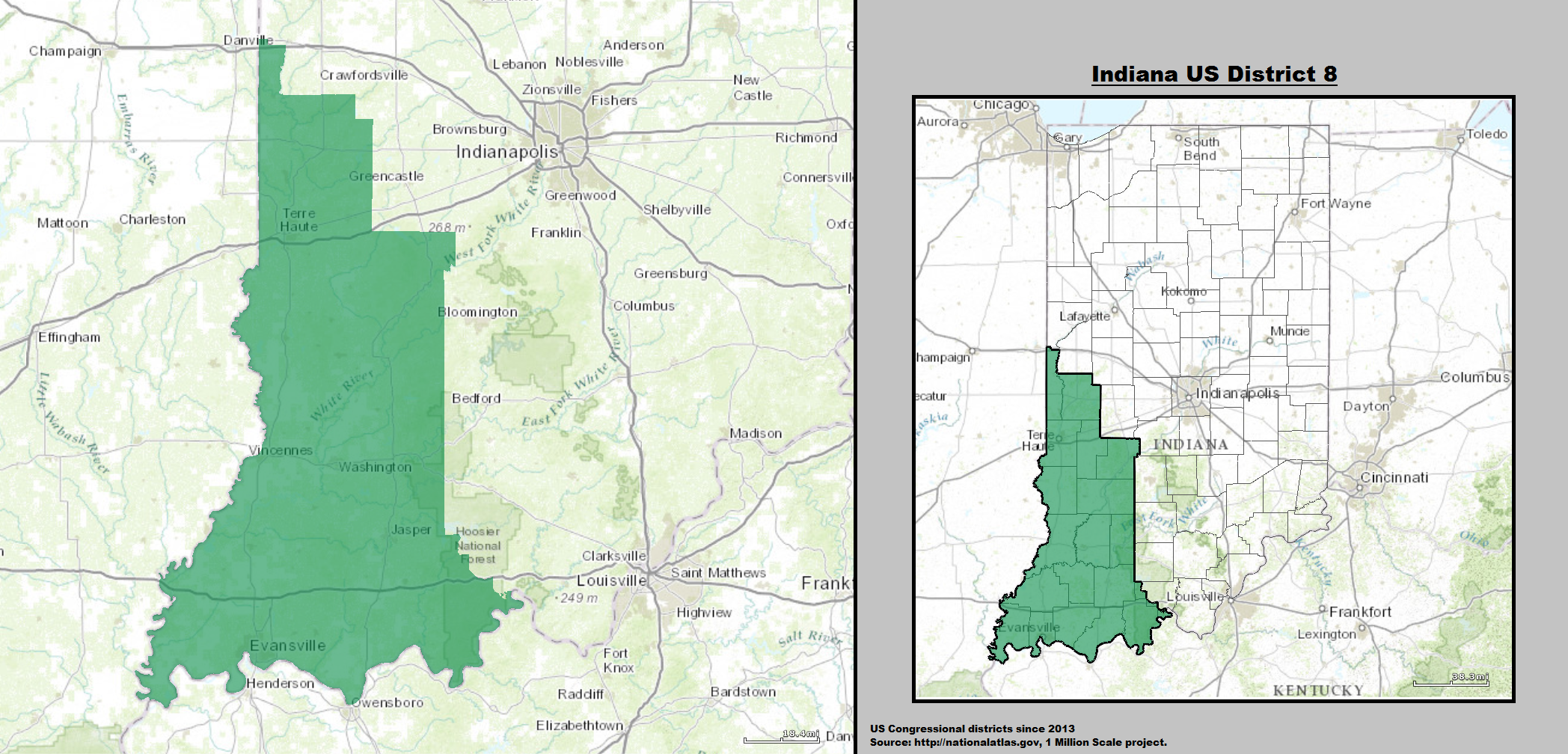
2013 – 2023

== See also ==
- Indiana's congressional districts
- List of United States congressional districts
