= Winfield K. Denton =

American politician (1896–1971)

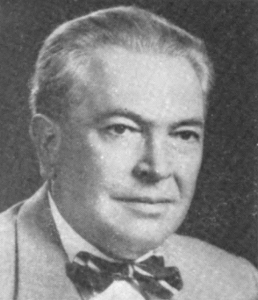

Member of the U.S. House of Representatives from Indiana's 8th district
- In office January 3, 1955 – December 30, 1966
- Preceded by: D. Bailey Merrill
- Succeeded by: Roger Zion
- In office January 3, 1949 – January 3, 1953
- Preceded by: E. A. Mitchell
- Succeeded by: D. Bailey Merrill

Member of the Indiana House of Representatives
- In office 1937–1942

Personal details
- Born: October 28, 1896 Evansville, Indiana, U.S.
- Died: November 2, 1971 (aged 75) Evansville, Indiana, U.S.
- Party: Democratic
- Relations: George Kirkpatrick Denton (father)
- Education: De Pauw University, Harvard Law School

Winfield Kirkpatrick Denton (October 28, 1896 – November 2, 1971) was an American lawyer, military veteran, and politician who served several terms as a U.S. representative from Indiana in the mid-20th century. He was the son of George Kirkpatrick Denton.

== Biography ==
Born in Evansville, Indiana, Denton attended the public schools. He attended De Pauw University, Greencastle, Indiana. A.B., De Pauw University, 1919. J.D., Harvard Law School, Cambridge, Massachusetts, 1922. He was in the United States Army Air Corps in 1919 during World War I in 1919. He was in the United States Army from 1942 to 1945 during World War II and became a lieutenant colonel.

He was a lawyer in private practice. He served as prosecuting attorney, Vanderburgh County, Indiana from 1932 to 1936. He served as member of the Indiana state legislature from 1937 to 1942, and as minority leader, 1941. He served as member of the Indiana state budget committee from 1940 to 1942.

=== Congress ===
Denton first ran for Congress unsuccessfully in 1946. Denton was elected as a Democrat to the Eighty-first and to the succeeding Congress (January 3, 1949 – January 3, 1953). He was an unsuccessful candidate for reelection to the Eighty-third Congress in 1952. He served as delegate to each Democratic National Convention, 1952 to 1964.

Denton was elected to the Eighty-fourth and to the five succeeding Congresses and served until his resignation on December 30, 1966 (January 3, 1955 – December 30, 1966). He was an unsuccessful candidate for reelection to the Ninetieth Congress in 1966.

=== Death ===
He died on November 2, 1971, in Evansville, Indiana. He was interred in Oak Hill Cemetery.

U.S. House of Representatives
Preceded by E. A. Mitchell	Member of the U.S. House of Representatives from Indiana's 8th congressional district 1949–1953	Succeeded by D. Bailey Merrill
Preceded by D. Bailey Merrill	Member of the U.S. House of Representatives from Indiana's 8th congressional district 1955–1966	Succeeded by Roger H. Zion
