= List of United States representatives from Indiana =

The following is an alphabetical list of United States representatives from the state of Indiana. For chronological tables of members of both houses of the United States Congress from the state (through the present day), see Indiana's congressional delegations.

== Current representatives ==
As of January 3, 2025

- 1st district: Frank J. Mrvan (D) (since 2021)
- 2nd district: Rudy Yakym (R) (since 2022)
- 3rd district: Marlin Stutzman (R) (since 2025)
- 4th district: Jim Baird (R) (since 2019)
- 5th district: Victoria Spartz (R) (since 2021)
- 6th district: Jefferson Shreve (R) (since 2025)
- 7th district: André Carson (D) (since 2008)
- 8th district: Mark Messmer (R) (since 2025)
- 9th district: Erin Houchin (R) (since 2023)

== List of members and delegates ==
Member / delegate	Party	Years	District	Electoral history
E. Ross Adair	Republican	January 3, 1951 – January 3, 1971	4th	Elected in 1950. Lost re-election to Roush.
John A. M. Adair	Democratic	March 4, 1907 – March 4, 1917	8th	Elected in 1906. Retired to run for Governor of Indiana.
Nathaniel Albertson	Democratic	March 4, 1849 – March 4, 1851	1st	Elected in 1849. Lost renomination to Lockhart.
Jim Baird	Republican	January 3, 2019 – present	4th	Elected in 2018. Incumbent.
John Baker	Republican	March 4, 1875 – March 4, 1881	13th	Elected in 1874. Retired.
Jim Banks	Republican	January 3, 2017 – January 3, 2025	3rd	Elected in 2016. Retired to run for U.S. Senator.
Lucien Barbour	Opposition	March 4, 1855 – March 4, 1857	6th	Elected in 1854. Retired.
William O. Barnard	Republican	March 4, 1909 – March 4, 1911	6th	Elected in 1908. Lost re-election to Gray.
Henry A. Barnhart	Democratic	November 3, 1908 – March 4, 1919	13th	Elected to finish Brick's term. Lost re-election to Hickey.
Joseph W. Barr	Democratic	January 3, 1959 – January 3, 1961	11th	Elected in 1958. Lost re-election to Bruce.
John V. Beamer	Republican	January 3, 1951 – January 3, 1959	5th	Elected in 1950. Lost re-election to Roush.
John S. Benham	Republican	March 4, 1919 – March 4, 1923	4th	Elected in 1918. Lost re-election to Canfield.
Adam Benjamin Jr.	Democratic	January 3, 1977 – September 7, 1982	1st	Elected in 1976. Died.
George A. Bicknell	Democratic	March 4, 1877 – March 4, 1881	3rd	Elected in 1876. Lost renomination to Stockslager.
Thomas H. Blake	Anti-Jacksonian	March 4, 1827 – March 4, 1829	1st	Elected in 1826. Lost re-election to Boon.
Oscar E. Bland	Republican	March 4, 1917 – March 4, 1923	2nd	Elected in 1916. Lost re-election to Greenwood.
John W. Boehne	Democratic	March 4, 1909 – March 4, 1913	1st	Elected in 1908. Retired.
John W. Boehne Jr.	Democratic	March 4, 1931 – March 4, 1933	1st	Elected in 1930. Redistricted to the 8th district.
John W. Boehne Jr.	Democratic	March 4, 1933 – January 3, 1943	8th	Redistricted from the 1st district and re-elected in 1932. Lost re-election to La Follette.
Ratliff Boon	Jacksonian	March 4, 1825 – March 4, 1827	1st	Elected in 1824. Lost re-election to Blake.
Ratliff Boon	Jacksonian	March 4, 1829 – March 4, 1837	1st	Elected in 1828. Switched parties.
Ratliff Boon	Democratic	March 4, 1837 – March 4, 1839	1st	Re-elected in 1837 as a Democrat. Retired.
John Brademas	Democratic	January 3, 1959 – January 3, 1981	3rd	Elected in 1958. Lost re-election to Hiler.
William G. Bray	Republican	January 3, 1951 – January 3, 1967	7th	Elected in 1950. Redistricted to the 6th district.
William G. Bray	Republican	January 3, 1967 – January 3, 1975	6th	Redistricted from the 7th district and re-elected in 1966. Lost re-election to D. Evans.
Samuel Brenton	Whig	March 4, 1851 – March 4, 1853	10th	Elected in 1851. Lost re-election to Chamberlain.
Samuel Brenton	Opposition	March 4, 1855 – March 4, 1857	10th	Elected in 1854. Re-elected in 1856 but died on start date of term.
Samuel Brenton	Republican	March 4, 1857 – March 29, 1857	10th	Died.
John L. Bretz	Democratic	March 4, 1891 – March 4, 1895	2nd	Elected in 1890. Lost re-election to Hardy.
Abraham L. Brick	Republican	March 4, 1899 – April 7, 1908	13th	Elected in 1898. Died.
Susan Brooks	Republican	January 3, 2013 – January 3, 2021	5th	Elected in 2012. Retired.
Elijah V. Brookshire	Democratic	March 4, 1889 – March 4, 1895	8th	Elected in 1888. Lost re-election to Faris.
Jason B. Brown	Democratic	March 4, 1889 – March 4, 1895	3rd	Elected in 1888. Lost renomination to Stockslager.
William J. Brown	Democratic	March 4, 1843 – March 4, 1845	5th	Elected in 1843. Retired.
William J. Brown	Democratic	March 4, 1849 – March 4, 1851	5th	Elected in 1849. Lost renomination to T. Hendricks.
Thomas M. Browne	Republican	March 4, 1877 – March 4, 1881	5th	Elected in 1876. Redistricted to the 6th district.
Thomas M. Browne	Republican	March 4, 1881 – March 4, 1891	6th	Redistricted from the 5th district and re-elected in 1880. Retired.
Charles B. Brownson	Republican	January 3, 1951 – January 3, 1959	11th	Elected in 1950. Lost re-election to Barr.
Donald C. Bruce	Republican	January 3, 1961 – January 3, 1965	11th	Elected in 1960. Retired to run for U.S. Senator.
Larry Bucshon	Republican	January 3, 2011 – January 3, 2025	8th	Elected in 2010. Retired.
Dan Burton	Republican	January 3, 1983 – January 3, 2003	6th	Elected in 1982. Redistricted to the 5th district.
Dan Burton	Republican	January 3, 2003 – January 3, 2013	5th	Redistricted from the 6th district and re-elected in 2002. Retired.
Steve Buyer	Republican	January 3, 1993 – January 3, 2003	5th	Elected in 1992. Redistricted to the 4th district.
Steve Buyer	Republican	January 3, 2003 – January 3, 2011	4th	Redistricted from the 5th district and re-elected in 2002. Retired.
William D. Bynum	Democratic	March 4, 1885 – March 4, 1895	7th	Elected in 1884. Lost re-election to Henry.
William H. Calkins	Republican	March 4, 1877 – March 4, 1881	10th	Elected in 1876. Redistricted to the 13th district.
William H. Calkins	Republican	March 4, 1881 – October 20, 1884	13th	Redistricted from the 10th district and re-elected in 1880. Retired to run for governor and resigned.
Jacob Call	Democratic-Republican	December 23, 1824 – March 4, 1825	1st	Elected only to finish Prince's term. Was not candidate for full term.
Harry C. Canfield	Democratic	March 4, 1923 – March 4, 1933	4th	Elected in 1922. Lost renomination to Farley.
John Carr	Jacksonian	March 4, 1831 – March 4, 1833	2nd	Elected in 1831. Redistricted to the 3rd district.
John Carr	Jacksonian	March 4, 1833 – March 4, 1837	3rd	Redistricted from the 2nd district and re-elected in 1833. Retired.
John Carr	Democratic	March 4, 1839 – March 4, 1841	3rd	Elected in 1839. Lost re-election to J. L. White.
Nathan T. Carr	Democratic	December 5, 1876 – March 4, 1877	3rd	Elected to finish Kerr's term. Was not candidate for full term.
André Carson	Democratic	March 11, 2008 – present	7th	Elected to finish Julia Carson's term. Incumbent.
Julia Carson	Democratic	January 3, 1997 – January 3, 2003	10th	Elected in 1996. Redistricted to the 7th district.
Julia Carson	Democratic	January 3, 2003 – December 15, 2007	7th	Redistricted from the 10th district and re-elected in 2002. Died.
Charles Case	Republican	December 7, 1857 – March 4, 1861	10th	Elected to finish Brenton's term. retired.
Thomas J. Cason	Republican	March 4, 1873 – March 4, 1875	7th	Elected in 1872. Redistricted to the 9th district.
Thomas J. Cason	Republican	March 4, 1875 – March 4, 1877	9th	Redistricted from the 7th district and re-elected in 1874. Lost renomination to M. White.
Charles W. Cathcart	Democratic	March 4, 1845 – March 4, 1849	9th	Elected in 1845. Retired.
Ebenezer M. Chamberlain	Democratic	March 4, 1853 – March 4, 1855	10th	Elected in 1852. Lost re-election to Brenton.
John C. Chaney	Republican	March 4, 1905 – March 4, 1909	2nd	Elected in 1904. Lost re-election to Cullop.
Joseph B. Cheadle	Republican	March 4, 1887 – March 4, 1891	9th	Elected in 1886. Lost renomination to Waugh.
Chris Chocola	Republican	January 3, 2003 – January 3, 2007	2nd	Elected in 2002. Lost re-election to Donnelly.
Cyrus Cline	Democratic	March 4, 1909 – March 4, 1917	12th	Elected in 1908. Lost re-election to Fairfield.
Dan Coats	Republican	January 3, 1981 – January 3, 1989	4th	Elected in 1980. Resigned when appointed U.S. Senator.
Thomas R. Cobb	Democratic	March 4, 1877 – March 4, 1887	2nd	Elected in 1876. Retired.
John Coburn	Republican	March 4, 1867 – March 4, 1869	6th	Elected in 1866. Redistricted to the 5th district.
John Coburn	Republican	March 4, 1869 – March 4, 1875	5th	Redistricted from the 6th district and re-elected in 1868. Redistricted to the 7th district and lost re-election to Landers.
Walpole G. Colerick	Democratic	March 4, 1879 – March 4, 1883	12th	Elected in 1878. Retired.
Schuyler Colfax	Opposition	March 4, 1855 – March 4, 1857	9th	Elected in 1854. Switched parties.
Schuyler Colfax	Republican	March 4, 1857 – March 4, 1869	9th	Re-elected in 1856 as a Republican. Retired to run for U.S. Vice President.
Daniel Webster Comstock	Republican	March 4, 1917 – May 19, 1917	6th	Elected in 1916. Died.
Charles G. Conn	Democratic	March 4, 1893 – March 4, 1895	13th	Elected in 1892. Retired.
Samuel E. Cook	Democratic	March 4, 1923 – March 4, 1925	11th	Elected in 1922. Lost re-election to A. Hall.
George W. Cooper	Democratic	March 4, 1889 – March 4, 1895	5th	Elected in 1888. Lost re-election to Overstreet.
David L. Cornwell	Democratic	January 3, 1977 – January 3, 1979	8th	Elected in 1976. Lost re-election to Deckard.
Calvin Cowgill	Republican	March 4, 1879 – March 4, 1881	11th	Elected in 1878. Retired.
William E. Cox	Democratic	March 4, 1907 – March 4, 1919	3rd	Elected in 1906. Lost re-election to Dunbar.
James A. Cravens	Democratic	March 4, 1861 – March 4, 1865	2nd	Elected in 1860. Retired.
James H. Cravens	Whig	March 4, 1841 – March 4, 1843	4th	Elected in 1841. Retired.
George W. Cromer	Republican	March 4, 1899 – March 4, 1907	8th	Elected in 1898. Lost re-election to J. Adair.
Thurman C. Crook	Democratic	January 3, 1949 – January 3, 1951	3rd	Elected in 1948. Lost re-election to Crumpacker Jr.
Eugene B. Crowe	Democratic	March 4, 1931 – March 4, 1933	3rd	Elected in 1930. Redistricted to the 9th district.
Eugene B. Crowe	Democratic	March 4, 1933 – January 3, 1941	9th	Redistricted from the 3rd district and re-elected in 1932. Lost re-election to E. Wilson.
Edgar D. Crumpacker	Republican	March 4, 1897 – March 4, 1913	10th	Elected in 1896. Lost re-election to Peterson.
Shepard J. Crumpacker Jr.	Republican	January 3, 1951 – January 3, 1957	3rd	Elected in 1950. Retired.
William A. Cullop	Democratic	March 4, 1909 – March 4, 1917	2nd	Elected in 1908. Lost re-election to Bland.
William Cumback	Opposition	March 4, 1855 – March 4, 1857	4th	Elected in 1854. Lost re-election as a Republican to Foley.
John G. Davis	Democratic	March 4, 1851 – March 4, 1855	7th	Elected in 1851. Lost re-election to Scott.
John G. Davis	Anti-Lecompton Democrat	March 4, 1857 – March 4, 1861	7th	Elected in 1856. Retired.
John Wesley Davis	Jacksonian	March 4, 1835 – March 4, 1837	2nd	Elected in 1835. Retired.
John Wesley Davis	Democratic	March 4, 1839 – March 4, 1841	2nd	Elected in 1839. Lost renomination to Lockhart.
John Wesley Davis	Democratic	March 4, 1843 – March 4, 1847	6th	Elected in 1843. Retired.
Gilbert De La Matyr	Greenback	March 4, 1879 – March 4, 1881	7th	Elected in 1878. Lost re-election to Peelle.
Mark L. De Motte	Republican	March 4, 1881 – March 4, 1883	10th	Elected in 1880. Lost re-election to T. Wood.
H. Joel Deckard	Republican	January 3, 1979 – January 3, 1983	8th	Elected in 1978. Lost re-election to McCloskey.
Joseph H. Defrees	Republican	March 4, 1865 – March 4, 1867	10th	Elected in 1864. Retired.
David W. Dennis	Republican	January 3, 1969 – January 3, 1975	10th	Elected in 1968. Lost re-election to Sharp.
George K. Denton	Democratic	March 4, 1917 – March 4, 1919	1st	Elected in 1916. Lost re-election to Luhring.
Winfield K. Denton	Democratic	January 3, 1949 – January 3, 1953	8th	Elected in 1948. Lost re-election to Merrill.
Winfield K. Denton	Democratic	January 3, 1955 – December 30, 1966	8th	Elected in 1954. Lost re-election to Zion and resigned before next term began.
Lincoln Dixon	Democratic	March 4, 1905 – March 4, 1919	4th	Elected in 1904. Lost re-election to Benham.
Joe Donnelly	Democratic	January 3, 2007 – January 3, 2013	2nd	Elected in 2006. Retired to run for U.S. Senator.
Charles T. Doxey	Republican	January 17, 1883 – March 4, 1883	9th	Elected to finish Orth's term. Was not a candidate for the next term.
Ebenezer Dumont	Union	March 4, 1863 – March 4, 1865	6th	Elected in 1862. Switched parties.
Ebenezer Dumont	Republican	March 4, 1865 – March 4, 1867	6th	Re-elected in 1864 as a Republican. Retired.
James W. Dunbar	Republican	March 4, 1919 – March 4, 1923	3rd	Elected in 1918. Retired.
James W. Dunbar	Republican	March 4, 1929 – March 4, 1931	3rd	Elected in 1928. Lost re-election to Crowe.
Cyrus L. Dunham	Democratic	March 4, 1849 – March 4, 1853	2nd	Elected in 1849. Redistricted to the 3rd district.
Cyrus L. Dunham	Democratic	March 4, 1853 – March 4, 1855	3rd	Redistricted from the 2nd district and re-elected in 1852. Lost re-election to G. G. Dunn.
George Grundy Dunn	Whig	March 4, 1847 – March 4, 1849	6th	Elected in 1847. Retired.
George Grundy Dunn	Opposition	March 4, 1855 – March 4, 1857	3rd	Elected in 1854. Retired.
George Hedford Dunn	Whig	March 4, 1837 – March 4, 1839	4th	Elected in 1837. Lost re-election to T. Smith.
William McKee Dunn	Republican	March 4, 1859 – March 4, 1863	3rd	Elected in 1858. Lost re-election to Harrington.
George R. Durgan	Democratic	March 4, 1933 – January 3, 1935	2nd	Elected in 1932. Lost re-election to Frederick Landis, who died before start of term.
Norman Eddy	Democratic	March 4, 1853 – March 4, 1855	9th	Elected in 1852. Lost re-election to Colfax.
Joseph K. Edgerton	Democratic	March 4, 1863 – March 4, 1865	10th	Elected in 1862. Lost re-election to Defrees.
Richard N. Elliott	Republican	June 29, 1917 – March 4, 1931	6th	Elected to finish Comstock's term. Lost re-election to Larrabee.
Brad Ellsworth	Democratic	January 3, 2007 – January 3, 2011	8th	Elected in 2006. Retired to run for U.S. Senator.
Elisha Embree	Whig	March 4, 1847 – March 4, 1849	1st	Elected in 1847. Lost re-election to Albertson.
William E. English	Democratic	May 22, 1884 – March 4, 1885	7th	Won contested election. Retired.
William Hayden English	Democratic	March 4, 1853 – March 4, 1861	2nd	Elected in 1852. Retired.
David W. Evans	Democratic	January 3, 1975 – January 3, 1983	6th	Elected in 1974. Redistricted to the 10th district and lost renomination to A. Jacobs Jr.
James La Fayette Evans	Republican	March 4, 1875 – March 4, 1879	11th	Elected in 1874. Retired.
John Ewing	Anti-Jacksonian	March 4, 1833 – March 4, 1835	2nd	Elected in 1833. Lost re-election to J. W. Davis.
John Ewing	Whig	March 4, 1837 – March 4, 1839	2nd	Elected in 1837. Lost re-election to J. W. Davis.
Louis W. Fairfield	Republican	March 4, 1917 – March 4, 1925	12th	Elected in 1916. Lost renomination to Hogg.
George W. Faris	Republican	March 4, 1895 – March 4, 1897	8th	Elected in 1894. Redistricted to the 5th district.
George W. Faris	Republican	March 4, 1897 – March 4, 1901	5th	Redistricted from the 8th district and re-elected in 1896. Retired.
James I. Farley	Democratic	March 4, 1933 – January 3, 1939	4th	Elected in 1932. Lost re-election to Gillie.
John H. Farquhar	Republican	March 4, 1865 – March 4, 1867	4th	Elected in 1864. Retired.
Graham N. Fitch	Democratic	March 4, 1849 – March 4, 1853	9th	Elected in 1849. Retired.
Floyd Fithian	Democratic	January 3, 1975 – January 3, 1983	2nd	Elected in 1974. Retired to run for U.S. Senator.
James B. Foley	Democratic	March 4, 1857 – March 4, 1859	4th	Elected in 1856. Retired.
George Ford	Democratic	March 4, 1885 – March 4, 1887	13th	Elected in 1884. Retired.
John H. Foster	Republican	May 16, 1905 – March 4, 1909	1st	Elected to finish the vacant term. Lost re-election to Boehne.
Benoni S. Fuller	Democratic	March 4, 1875 – March 4, 1879	1st	Elected in 1874. Retired.
Frank Gardner	Democratic	March 4, 1923 – March 4, 1929	3rd	Elected in 1922. Lost re-election to Dunbar.
Newton W. Gilbert	Republican	March 4, 1905 – November 6, 1906	12th	Elected in 1904. Resigned to become Judge of First Instance in Manila, Philippines.
Clarence C. Gilhams	Republican	November 6, 1906 – March 4, 1909	12th	Elected to finish Gilbert's term. Lost re-election to Cline.
Courtland C. Gillen	Democratic	March 4, 1931 – March 4, 1933	5th	Elected in 1930. Lost renomination to Griswold.
George W. Gillie	Republican	January 3, 1939 – January 3, 1949	4th	Elected in 1938. Lost re-election to Kruse.
Willis A. Gorman	Democratic	March 4, 1849 – March 4, 1853	6th	Elected in 1849. Retired.
William Graham	Whig	March 4, 1837 – March 4, 1839	3rd	Elected in 1837. Lost re-election to J. Carr.
Robert A. Grant	Republican	January 3, 1939 – January 3, 1949	3rd	Elected in 1938. Lost re-election to Crook.
Finly H. Gray	Democratic	March 4, 1911 – March 4, 1917	6th	Elected in 1910. Lost re-election to Comstock.
Finly H. Gray	Democratic	March 4, 1933 – January 3, 1939	10th	Elected in 1932. Lost re-election to Springer.
Arthur H. Greenwood	Democratic	March 4, 1923 – March 4, 1933	2nd	Elected in 1922. Redistricted to the 7th district.
Arthur H. Greenwood	Democratic	March 4, 1933 – January 3, 1939	7th	Redistricted from the 2nd district and re-elected in 1932. Lost re-election to G. Landis.
James M. Gregg	Democratic	March 4, 1857 – March 4, 1859	6th	Elected in 1856. Retired.
Francis M. Griffith	Democratic	December 6, 1897 – March 4, 1905	4th	Elected to finish Holman's term. Retired.
Glenn Griswold	Democratic	March 4, 1931 – March 4, 1933	11th	Elected in 1930. Redistricted to the 5th district.
Glenn Griswold	Democratic	March 4, 1933 – January 3, 1939	5th	Redistricted from the 11th district and re-elected in 1932. Lost re-election to Harness.
Albert R. Hall	Republican	March 4, 1925 – March 4, 1931	11th	Elected in 1924. Lost re-election to Griswold.
Katie Hall	Democratic	November 2, 1982 – January 3, 1985	1st	Elected to finish Benjamin's term. Lost renomination to Visclosky.
Charles A. Halleck	Republican	January 29, 1935 – January 3, 1969	2nd	Elected to finish F. Landis's term. Retired.
Andrew H. Hamilton	Democratic	March 4, 1875 – March 4, 1879	12th	Elected in 1874. Retired.
Lee Hamilton	Democratic	January 3, 1965 – January 3, 1999	9th	Elected in 1964. Retired.
Thomas Hammond	Democratic	March 4, 1893 – March 4, 1895	10th	Elected in 1892. Retired.
Frank Hanly	Republican	March 4, 1895 – March 4, 1897	9th	Elected in 1894. Lost renomination to C. Landis.
John Hanna	Republican	March 4, 1877 – March 4, 1879	7th	Elected in 1876. Lost re-election to Matyr.
Edward A. Hannegan	Jacksonian	March 4, 1833 – March 4, 1837	7th	Elected in 1833. Retired.
Cecil M. Harden	Republican	January 3, 1949 – January 3, 1959	6th	Elected in 1948. Lost re-election to Wampler.
Alexander M. Hardy	Republican	March 4, 1895 – March 4, 1897	2nd	Elected in 1894. Lost re-election to Miers.
Andrew J. Harlan	Democratic	March 4, 1849 – March 4, 1851	10th	Elected in 1849. Retired.
Andrew J. Harlan	Democratic	March 4, 1853 – March 4, 1855	11th	Elected in 1852. Retired.
Randall S. Harmon	Democratic	January 3, 1959 – January 3, 1961	10th	Elected in 1958. Lost re-election to Harvey.
Forest Harness	Republican	January 3, 1939 – January 3, 1949	5th	Elected in 1938. Lost re-election to Walsh.
Henry W. Harrington	Democratic	March 4, 1863 – March 4, 1865	3rd	Elected in 1862. Lost re-election to R. Hill.
Ralph Harvey	Republican	November 4, 1947 – January 3, 1959	10th	Elected to finish Springer's term. Lost re-election to Harmon.
Ralph Harvey	Republican	January 3, 1961 – December 30, 1966	10th	Elected in 1960. Lost renomination to Roudebush and resigned early.
Jethro A. Hatch	Republican	March 4, 1895 – March 4, 1897	10th	Elected in 1894. Retired.
Philip H. Hayes	Democratic	January 3, 1975 – January 3, 1977	8th	Elected in 1974. Retired to run for U.S. Senator.
William S. Haymond	Democratic	March 4, 1875 – March 4, 1877	10th	Elected in 1874. Lost re-election to Calkins.
William Heilman	Republican	March 4, 1879 – March 4, 1883	1st	Elected in 1878. Lost re-election to Kleiner.
James A. Hemenway	Republican	March 4, 1895 – March 3, 1905	1st	Elected in 1894. Resigned when elected U.S. senator.
Thomas A. Hendricks	Democratic	March 4, 1851 – March 4, 1853	5th	Elected in 1851. Redistricted to the 6th district.
Thomas A. Hendricks	Democratic	March 4, 1853 – March 4, 1855	6th	Redistricted from the 5th district and re-elected in 1852. Lost re-election to Barbour.
William Hendricks	Democratic-Republican	December 11, 1816 – July 25, 1822	At-large	Elected in 1816. Resigned to become Governor of Indiana.
Thomas J. Henley	Democratic	March 4, 1843 – March 4, 1849	2nd	Elected in 1843. Retired.
Charles L. Henry	Republican	March 4, 1895 – March 4, 1897	7th	Elected in 1894. Redistricted to the 8th district.
Charles L. Henry	Republican	March 4, 1897 – March 4, 1899	8th	Redistricted from the 7th district and re-elected in 1896. Retired.
William Herod	Anti-Jacksonian	January 25, 1837 – March 4, 1837	6th	Elected to finish Kinnard's term. Switched parties.
William Herod	Whig	March 4, 1837 – March 4, 1839	6th	Re-elected in 1837 as a Whig. Lost re-election to Wick.
Andrew J. Hickey	Republican	March 4, 1919 – March 4, 1931	13th	Elected in 1918. Lost re-election to Pettengill.
John P. Hiler	Republican	January 3, 1981 – January 3, 1991	3rd	Elected in 1980. Lost re-election to Roemer.
Baron Hill	Democratic	January 3, 1999 – January 3, 2005	9th	Elected in 1998. Lost re-election to Sodrel.
Baron Hill	Democratic	January 3, 2007 – January 3, 2011	9th	Elected in 2006. Lost re-election to Young.
Ralph Hill	Republican	March 4, 1865 – March 4, 1867	3rd	Elected in 1864. Retired.
Elwood Hillis	Republican	January 3, 1971 – January 3, 1987	5th	Elected in 1970. Retired
Earl Hogan	Democratic	January 3, 1959 – January 3, 1961	9th	Elected in 1958. Lost re-election to E. Wilson.
David Hogg	Republican	March 4, 1925 – March 4, 1933	12th	Elected in 1924. Redistricted to the 4th district and lost re-election to Farley.
Trey Hollingsworth	Republican	January 3, 2017 – January 3, 2023	9th	Elected in 2016. Retired.
Elias S. Holliday	Republican	March 4, 1901 – March 4, 1909	5th	Elected in 1900. Retired.
David P. Holloway	Opposition	March 4, 1855 – March 4, 1857	5th	Elected in 1854. Retired.
William S. Holman	Democratic	March 4, 1859 – March 4, 1865	4th	Elected in 1858. Retired.
William S. Holman	Democratic	March 4, 1867 – March 4, 1869	4th	Elected in 1866. Redistricted to the 3rd district.
William S. Holman	Democratic	March 4, 1869 – March 4, 1875	3rd	Redistricted from the 4th district and re-elected in 1868. Redistricted to the 5th district.
William S. Holman	Democratic	March 4, 1875 – March 4, 1877	5th	Redistricted from the 3rd district and re-elected in 1874. Lost re-election to Browne.
William S. Holman	Democratic	March 4, 1881 – March 4, 1895	4th	Elected in 1880. Lost re-election to Watson.
William S. Holman	Democratic	March 4, 1897 – April 22, 1897	4th	Elected in 1896. Died.
Abraham J. Hostetler	Democratic	March 4, 1879 – March 4, 1881	8th	Elected in 1878. Retired.
John Hostettler	Republican	January 3, 1995 – January 3, 2007	8th	Elected in 1994. Lost re-election to Ellsworth.
Erin Houchin	Republican	January 3, 2023 – present	9th	Elected in 2022. Incumbent.
Alvin P. Hovey	Republican	March 4, 1887 – January 17, 1889	1st	Elected in 1886. Retired to run for Governor of Indiana and resigned to take office.
Jonas G. Howard	Democratic	March 4, 1885 – March 4, 1889	3rd	Elected in 1884. Lost renomination to J. Brown.
Tilghman Howard	Democratic	August 5, 1839 – July 1, 1840	7th	Elected in 1839. Resigned.
William H. Hudnut III	Republican	January 3, 1973 – January 3, 1975	11th	Elected in 1972. Lost re-election to A. Jacobs Jr.
James Hughes	Democratic	March 4, 1857 – March 4, 1859	3rd	Elected in 1856. Lost re-election to W. Dunn.
Andrew Humphreys	Democratic	December 5, 1876 – March 4, 1877	2nd	Elected to finish Williams's term. Was not candidate for full term.
Morton C. Hunter	Republican	March 4, 1867 – March 4, 1869	3rd	Elected in 1866. Retired.
Morton C. Hunter	Republican	March 4, 1873 – March 4, 1875	6th	Elected in 1872. Redistricted to the 8th district.
Morton C. Hunter	Republican	March 4, 1875 – March 4, 1879	8th	Redistricted from the 6th district and re-elected in 1874. Lost re-election to Hostetler.
Andrew Jacobs Sr.	Democratic	January 3, 1949 – January 3, 1951	11th	Elected in 1948. Lost re-election to Brownson.
Andrew Jacobs Jr.	Democratic	January 3, 1965 – January 3, 1973	11th	Elected in 1964. Lost re-election to Hudnut.
Andrew Jacobs Jr.	Democratic	January 3, 1975 – January 3, 1983	11th	Elected in 1974. Redistricted to the 10th district.
Andrew Jacobs Jr.	Democratic	January 3, 1983 – January 3, 1997	10th	Redistricted from the 11th district and re-elected in 1982. Retired.
Virginia E. Jenckes	Democratic	March 4, 1933 – January 3, 1939	6th	Elected in 1932. Lost re-election to N. Johnson.
Jonathan Jennings	None	November 27, 1809 – December 11, 1816	Territory	Elected in 1809. Retired to become Governor of Indiana upon statehood.
Jonathan Jennings	Democratic-Republican	December 2, 1822 – March 4, 1823	At-large	Elected to finish Hendricks's term. Redistricted to the 2nd district.
Jonathan Jennings	Democratic-Republican	March 4, 1823 – March 4, 1825	2nd	Redistricted from the at-large district and re-elected in 1822. Switched parties.
Jonathan Jennings	Anti-Jacksonian	March 4, 1825 – March 4, 1831	2nd	Re-elected in 1824 as an Anti-Jacksonian. Lost re-election to J. Carr.
Henry U. Johnson	Republican	March 4, 1891 – March 4, 1899	6th	Elected in 1890. Retired.
Noble J. Johnson	Republican	March 4, 1925 – March 4, 1931	5th	Elected in 1924. Lost re-election to Gillen.
Noble J. Johnson	Republican	January 3, 1939 – July 1, 1948	6th	Elected in 1938. Resigned to become judge of the U.S. Court of Customs and Patent Appeals.
James T. Johnston	Republican	March 4, 1885 – March 4, 1889	8th	Elected in 1884. Lost re-election to Brookshire.
Jim Jontz	Democratic	January 3, 1987 – January 3, 1993	5th	Elected in 1986. Lost re-election to Buyer.
George Washington Julian	Free Soil	March 4, 1849 – March 4, 1851	4th	Elected in 1849. Lost re-election to Parker.
George Washington Julian	Republican	March 4, 1861 – March 4, 1869	5th	Elected in 1860. Redistricted to the 4th district.
George Washington Julian	Republican	March 4, 1869 – March 4, 1871	4th	Redistricted from the 5th district and re-elected in 1868. Lost renomination to J. M. Wilson.
Andrew Kennedy	Democratic	March 4, 1841 – March 4, 1843	5th	Elected in 1841. Redistricted to the 10th district.
Andrew Kennedy	Democratic	March 4, 1843 – March 4, 1847	10th	Redistricted from the 5th district and Re-elected in 1843. Retired.
Brian D. Kerns	Republican	January 3, 2001 – January 3, 2003	7th	Elected in 2000. Redistricted to the 4th district and lost renomination to Buyer.
Michael C. Kerr	Democratic	March 4, 1865 – March 4, 1873	2nd	Elected in 1864. Sought election in the at-large district and lost re-election to Packard, Orth, and W. Williams.
Michael C. Kerr	Democratic	March 4, 1875 – August 19, 1876	3rd	Elected in 1874. Died.
David Kilgore	Republican	March 4, 1857 – March 4, 1861	5th	Elected in 1856.
George L. Kinnard	Jacksonian	March 4, 1833 – November 26, 1836	6th	Elected in 1833. Died.
John J. Kleiner	Democratic	March 4, 1883 – March 4, 1887	1st	Elected in 1882. Lost renomination to J. E. McCullough.
Charles A. Korbly	Democratic	March 4, 1909 – March 4, 1915	7th	Elected in 1908. Lost re-election to Moores.
Milton Kraus	Republican	March 4, 1917 – March 4, 1923	11th	Elected in 1916. Lost re-election to Cook.
Edward H. Kruse	Democratic	January 3, 1949 – January 3, 1951	4th	Elected in 1948. Lost re-election to E. R. Adair.
Charles M. La Follette	Republican	January 3, 1943 – January 3, 1947	8th	Elected in 1942. Retired to run for U.S. Senator.
John E. Lamb	Democratic	March 4, 1883 – March 4, 1885	8th	Elected in 1882. Lost re-election to Johnston.
Franklin Landers	Democratic	March 4, 1875 – March 4, 1877	7th	Elected in 1874. Lost re-election to Hanna.
Earl F. Landgrebe	Republican	January 3, 1969 – January 3, 1975	2nd	Elected in 1968. Lost re-election to Fithian.
Charles B. Landis	Republican	March 4, 1897 – March 4, 1909	9th	Elected in 1896. Lost re-election to Morrison.
Frederick Landis	Republican	March 4, 1903 – March 4, 1907	11th	Elected in 1902. Lost re-election to Rauch.
Gerald W. Landis	Republican	January 3, 1939 – January 3, 1949	7th	Elected in 1938. Lost re-election to Noland.
Amos Lane	Jacksonian	March 4, 1833 – March 4, 1837	4th	Elected in 1833. Lost re-election to G. H. Dunn.
Henry S. Lane	Whig	August 3, 1840 – March 4, 1843	7th	Elected to finish Howard's term. Retired.
Jim Lane	Democratic	March 4, 1853 – March 4, 1855	4th	Elected in 1852. Retired.
William Larrabee	Democratic	March 4, 1931 – March 4, 1933	6th	Elected in 1930. Redistricted to the 11th district.
William Larrabee	Democratic	March 4, 1933 – January 3, 1943	11th	Redistricted from the 6th district and re-elected in 1932. Redistricted to the 10th district and lost re-election to Springer.
John Law	Democratic	March 4, 1861 – March 4, 1865	1st	Elected in 1860. Retired.
Jacob D. Leighty	Republican	March 4, 1895 – March 4, 1897	12th	Elected in 1894. Lost re-election to J. M. Robinson.
Charles Lieb	Democratic	March 4, 1913 – March 4, 1917	1st	Elected in 1912. Retired.
James Lockhart	Democratic	March 4, 1851 – March 4, 1853	1st	Elected in 1851. Retired.
James Lockhart	Democratic	March 4, 1857 – September 7, 1857	1st	Elected in 1856. Died.
Jill L. Long	Democratic	January 3, 1989 – January 3, 1995	4th	Elected to finish Coats's term. Lost re-election to Souder.
Robert Lowry	Democratic	March 4, 1883 – March 4, 1887	12th	Elected in 1882. Lost re-election to J. B. White.
Louis Ludlow	Democratic	March 4, 1929 – March 4, 1933	7th	Elected in 1928. Redistricted to the 12th district.
Louis Ludlow	Democratic	March 4, 1933 – January 3, 1943	12th	Redistricted from the 7th district and re-elected in 1932. Redistricted to the 11th district.
Louis Ludlow	Democratic	January 3, 1943 – January 3, 1949	11th	Redistricted from the 12th district and re-elected in 1942. Retired.
Oscar R. Luhring	Republican	March 4, 1919 – March 4, 1923	1st	Elected in 1918. Lost re-election to W. Wilson.
Daniel Mace	Democratic	March 4, 1851 – March 4, 1855	8th	Elected in 1851. Switched parties.
Daniel Mace	Opposition	March 4, 1855 – March 4, 1857	8th	Re-elected in 1854 for the Opposition Party. Retired.
Ray J. Madden	Democratic	January 3, 1943 – January 3, 1977	1st	Elected in 1942. Lost renomination to Benjamin Jr.
Mahlon D. Manson	Democratic	March 4, 1871 – March 4, 1873	7th	Elected in 1870. Lost re-election to Cason.
Augustus N. Martin	Democratic	March 4, 1889 – March 4, 1895	11th	Elected in 1888. Lost re-election to Steele.
Courtland C. Matson	Democratic	March 4, 1881 – March 4, 1889	5th	Elected in 1880. Retired to run for Governor of Indiana.
Johnathan McCarty	Jacksonian	March 4, 1831 – March 4, 1833	3rd	Elected in 1831. Redistricted to the 5th district.
Johnathan McCarty	Jacksonian	March 4, 1833 – March 4, 1835	5th	Redistricted from the 3rd district and re-elected in 1833. Switched parties.
Johnathan McCarty	Anti-Jacksonian	March 4, 1835 – March 4, 1837	5th	Re-elected in 1835 as an Anti-Jacksonian. Lost re-election to Rariden.
Charles A. O. McClellan	Democratic	March 4, 1889 – March 4, 1893	12th	Elected in 1888. Retired.
Frank McCloskey	Democratic	January 3, 1983 – January 3, 1985	8th	Elected in 1982. Seat vacant while election contest resolved.
Frank McCloskey	Democratic	May 1, 1985 – January 3, 1995	8th	Election contest resolved. Lost re-election to Hostettler.
Joseph E. McDonald	Democratic	March 4, 1849 – March 4, 1851	8th	Elected in 1849. Retired.
James F. McDowell	Democratic	March 4, 1863 – March 4, 1865	11th	Elected in 1862. Lost re-election to Stilwell.
Edward W. McGaughey	Whig	March 4, 1845 – March 4, 1847	7th	Elected in 1845. Lost renomination to Thompson.
Edward W. McGaughey	Whig	March 4, 1849 – March 4, 1851	7th	Elected in 1849. Lost re-election to J. G. Davis.
David M. McIntosh	Republican	January 3, 1995 – January 3, 2001	2nd	Elected in 1994. Retired to run for Governor of Indiana.
William F. McNagny	Democratic	March 4, 1893 – March 4, 1895	12th	Elected in 1892. Lost re-election to Leighty.
D. Bailey Merrill	Republican	January 3, 1953 – January 3, 1955	8th	Elected in 1952. Lost re-election to Denton.
Luke Messer	Republican	January 3, 2013 – January 3, 2019	6th	Elected in 2012. Retired to run for U.S. Senator.
Mark Messmer	Republican	January 3, 2025 – present	8th	Elected in 2024. Incumbent.
Robert W. Miers	Democratic	March 4, 1897 – March 4, 1905	2nd	Elected in 1896. Lost re-election to Chaney.
Smith Miller	Democratic	March 4, 1853 – March 4, 1857	1st	Elected in 1852. Retired.
E. A. Mitchell	Republican	January 3, 1947 – January 3, 1949	8th	Elected in 1946. Lost re-election to Denton.
William Mitchell	Republican	March 4, 1861 – March 4, 1863	10th	Elected in 1860. Lost re-election to Edgerton.
Merrill Moores	Republican	March 4, 1915 – March 4, 1925	7th	Elected in 1914. Lost renomination to Updike.
Martin A. Morrison	Democratic	March 4, 1909 – March 4, 1917	9th	Elected in 1908. Retired.
Ralph W. Moss	Democratic	March 4, 1909 – March 4, 1917	5th	Elected in 1908. Lost re-election to Sanders.
Frank J. Mrvan	Democratic	January 3, 2021 – present	1st	Elected in 2020. Incumbent.
John T. Myers	Republican	January 3, 1967 – January 3, 1997	7th	Elected in 1966. Retired.
William R. Myers	Democratic	March 4, 1879 – March 4, 1881	6th	Elected in 1878. Redistricted to the 9th district and lost re-election to Orth.
Jeptha D. New	Democratic	March 4, 1875 – March 4, 1877	4th	Elected in 1874. Retired.
Jeptha D. New	Democratic	March 4, 1879 – March 4, 1881	4th	Elected in 1878. Retired.
William E. Niblack	Democratic	December 7, 1857 – March 4, 1861	1st	Elected to finish Lockhart's term. Retired.
William E. Niblack	Democratic	March 4, 1865 – March 4, 1875	1st	Elected in 1864. Retired.
F. Jay Nimtz	Republican	January 3, 1957 – January 3, 1959	3rd	Elected in 1956. Lost re-election to Brademas.
James E. Noland	Democratic	January 3, 1949 – January 3, 1951	7th	Elected in 1948. Lost re-election to Bray.
John H. O'Neall	Democratic	March 4, 1887 – March 4, 1891	2nd	Elected in 1886. Retired.
Godlove Stein Orth	Republican	March 4, 1863 – March 4, 1869	8th	Elected in 1862. Redistricted to the 7th district.
Godlove Stein Orth	Republican	March 4, 1869 – March 4, 1871	7th	Redistricted from the 8th district and re-elected in 1868. Retired.
Godlove Stein Orth	Republican	March 4, 1873 – March 4, 1875	At-large	Elected in 1872. Retired.
Godlove Stein Orth	Republican	March 4, 1879 – December 16, 1882	9th	Elected in 1878. Lost re-election to Ward and died before next term began.
Jesse Overstreet	Republican	March 4, 1895 – March 4, 1897	5th	Elected in 1894. Redistricted to the 7th district.
Jesse Overstreet	Republican	March 4, 1897 – March 4, 1909	7th	Redistricted from the 5th district and re-elected in 1896. Lost re-election to Korbly.
Robert Dale Owen	Democratic	March 4, 1843 – March 4, 1847	1st	Elected in 1843. Lost re-election to Embree.
William D. Owen	Republican	March 4, 1885 – March 4, 1891	10th	Elected in 1884. Lost re-election to Patton.
Jasper Packard	Republican	March 4, 1869 – March 4, 1873	11th	Elected in 1868. Redistricted to the at-large district
Jasper Packard	Republican	March 4, 1873 – March 4, 1875	At-large	Redistricted from the 11th district and re-elected in 1872. Retired.
Samuel W. Parker	Whig	March 4, 1851 – March 4, 1853	4th	Elected in 1851. Redistricted to the 5th district.
Samuel W. Parker	Whig	March 4, 1853 – March 4, 1855	5th	Redistricted from the 4th district and re-elected in 1852. Retired.
Benjamin Parke	None	December 12, 1805 – March 1, 1808	Territory	Elected in 1805. Resigned to serve on the staff of Governor of Indiana Territory.
William F. Parrett	Democratic	March 4, 1889 – March 4, 1893	1st	Elected in 1888. Retired.
David H. Patton	Democratic	March 4, 1891 – March 4, 1893	10th	Elected in 1890. Retired.
Edward A. Pease	Republican	January 3, 1997 – January 3, 2001	7th	Elected in 1996. Retired.
Stanton J. Peelle	Republican	March 4, 1881 – May 22, 1884	7th	Elected in 1880. Lost contested election.
Robert B. F. Peirce	Republican	March 4, 1881 – March 4, 1883	8th	Elected in 1880. Lost re-election to Lamb.
Greg Pence	Republican	January 3, 2019 – January 3, 2025	6th	Elected in 2018. Retired.
Mike Pence	Republican	January 3, 2001 – January 3, 2003	2nd	Elected in 2000. Redistricted to the 6th district.
Mike Pence	Republican	January 3, 2003 – January 3, 2013	6th	Redistricted from the 2nd district and re-elected in 2002. Retired to run for Governor of Indiana.
John B. Peterson	Democratic	March 4, 1913 – March 4, 1915	10th	Elected in 1912. Lost re-election to W. Wood.
Samuel B. Pettengill	Democratic	March 4, 1931 – March 4, 1933	13th	Elected in 1930. Redistricted to the 3rd district.
Samuel B. Pettengill	Democratic	March 4, 1933 – January 3, 1939	3rd	Redistricted from the 13th district and re-elected in 1932. Retired.
John Pettit	Democratic	March 4, 1843 – March 4, 1849	8th	Elected in 1843. Lost renomination to McDonald.
John U. Pettit	Opposition	March 4, 1855 – March 4, 1857	11th	Elected in 1854. Switched parties.
John U. Pettit	Republican	March 4, 1857 – March 4, 1861	11th	Re-elected in 1856 as a Republican. Retired.
Albert G. Porter	Republican	March 4, 1859 – March 4, 1863	6th	Elected in 1858. Renominated but declined to run.
Francis B. Posey	Republican	January 29, 1889 – March 4, 1889	1st	Elected to finish Hovey's term. Lost election to the next term.
William Prince	Democratic-Republican	March 4, 1823 – September 8, 1824	1st	Elected in 1822. Died.
George H. Proffit	Whig	March 4, 1839 – March 4, 1843	1st	Elected in 1839. Retired.
Fred S. Purnell	Republican	March 4, 1917 – March 4, 1933	9th	Elected in 1916. Redistricted to the 6th district and lost re-election to Jenckes.
Dan Quayle	Republican	January 3, 1977 – January 3, 1981	4th	Elected in 1976. Retired to run for U.S. Senator.
James Rariden	Whig	March 4, 1837 – March 4, 1841	5th	Elected in 1837. Retired.
George W. Rauch	Democratic	March 4, 1907 – March 4, 1917	11th	Elected in 1906. Lost re-election to Kraus.
James M. Robinson	Democratic	March 4, 1897 – March 4, 1905	12th	Elected in 1896. Lost re-election to Gilbert.
John L. Robinson	Democratic	March 4, 1847 – March 4, 1853	3rd	Elected in 1847. Retired.
Milton S. Robinson	Republican	March 4, 1875 – March 4, 1879	6th	Elected in 1874. Retired.
William R. Rockhill	Democratic	March 4, 1847 – March 4, 1849	10th	Elected in 1847. Retired.
Tim Roemer	Democratic	January 3, 1991 – January 3, 2003	3rd	Elected in 1990. Retired.
Todd Rokita	Republican	January 3, 2011 – January 3, 2019	4th	Elected in 2010. Retired to run for U.S. Senator.
Richard L. Roudebush	Republican	January 3, 1961 – January 3, 1967	6th	Elected in 1960. Redistricted to the 10th district.
Richard L. Roudebush	Republican	January 3, 1967 – January 3, 1969	10th	Redistricted from the 6th district and re-elected in 1966. Redistricted to the 5th district.
Richard L. Roudebush	Republican	January 3, 1969 – January 3, 1971	5th	Redistricted from the 10th district and re-elected in 1968. Retired to run for U.S. Senator.
J. Edward Roush	Democratic	January 3, 1959 – January 3, 1961	5th	Elected in 1958. Seat vacant until election challenge resolved.
J. Edward Roush	Democratic	June 14, 1961 – January 3, 1969	5th	Election challenge resolved. Redistricted to the 4th district and lost re-election to Adair.
J. Edward Roush	Democratic	January 3, 1971 – January 3, 1977	4th	Elected in 1970. Lost re-election to Quayle.
Harry E. Rowbottom	Republican	March 4, 1925 – March 4, 1931	1st	Elected in 1924. Lost re-election to Boehne Jr.
Lemuel W. Royse	Republican	March 4, 1895 – March 4, 1899	13th	Elected in 1894. Lost renomination to Brick.
Samuel C. Sample	Whig	March 4, 1843 – March 4, 1845	9th	Elected in 1843. Lost re-election to Cathcart.
Everett Sanders	Republican	March 4, 1917 – March 4, 1925	5th	Elected in 1916. Retired.
Henry B. Sayler	Republican	March 4, 1873 – March 4, 1875	10th	Elected in 1872. Retired.
William T. Schulte	Democratic	March 4, 1933 – January 3, 1943	1st	Elected in 1932. Lost renomination to Madden.
Harvey D. Scott	Opposition	March 4, 1855 – March 4, 1857	7th	Elected in 1854. Retired.
Leonidas Sexton	Republican	March 4, 1877 – March 4, 1879	4th	Elected in 1876. Lost re-election to New.
John P. C. Shanks	Republican	March 4, 1861 – March 4, 1863	11th	Elected in 1860. Lost re-election to McDowell.
John P. C. Shanks	Republican	March 4, 1867 – March 4, 1869	11th	Elected in 1866. Redistricted to the 9th district.
John P. C. Shanks	Republican	March 4, 1869 – March 4, 1875	9th	Redistricted from the 11th district and re-elected in 1868. Lost renomination to Cason.
Phil Sharp	Democratic	January 3, 1975 – January 3, 1983	10th	Elected in 1974. Redistricted to the 2nd district.
Phil Sharp	Democratic	January 3, 1983 – January 3, 1995	2nd	Redistricted from the 10th district and re-elected in 1982. Retired.
Benjamin F. Shively	Anti-Monopolist	December 1, 1884 – March 4, 1885	13th	Elected to finish Calkins's term. Was not candidate for full term.
Benjamin F. Shively	Democratic	March 4, 1887 – March 4, 1893	13th	Elected in 1886. Retired.
Jefferson Shreve	Republican	January 3, 2025 – present	6th	Elected in 2024. Incumbent.
Caleb B. Smith	Whig	March 4, 1843 – March 4, 1849	4th	Elected in 1843. Retired.
Oliver H. Smith	Jacksonian	March 4, 1827 – March 4, 1829	3rd	Elected in 1826. Retired.
Thomas Smith	Democratic	March 4, 1839 – March 4, 1841	4th	Elected in 1839. Lost re-election to J. H. Cravens.
Thomas Smith	Democratic	March 4, 1843 – March 4, 1847	3rd	Elected in 1843. Retired.
Mike Sodrel	Republican	January 3, 2005 – January 3, 2007	9th	Elected in 2004. Lost re-election to B. Hill.
Mark Souder	Republican	January 3, 1995 – January 3, 2003	4th	Elected in 1994. Redistricted to the 3rd district.
Mark Souder	Republican	January 3, 2003 – May 21, 2010	3rd	Redistricted from the 4th district and re-elected in 2002. Resigned.
Victoria Spartz	Republican	January 3, 2021 – present	5th	Elected in 2020. Incumbent.
Raymond S. Springer	Republican	January 3, 1939 – August 28, 1947	10th	Elected in 1938. Died.
George Washington Steele	Republican	March 4, 1881 – March 4, 1889	11th	Elected in 1880. Lost re-election to Martin.
George Washington Steele	Republican	March 4, 1895 – March 4, 1903	11th	Elected in 1894. Retired.
Thomas N. Stilwell	Republican	March 4, 1865 – March 4, 1867	11th	Elected in 1864. Retired.
Strother M. Stockslager	Democratic	March 4, 1881 – March 4, 1885	3rd	Elected in 1880. Lost renomination to J. Howard.
Marlin Stutzman	Republican	November 16, 2010 – January 3, 2017	3rd	Elected to finish Souder's term. Retired to run for U.S. Senator.
Marlin Stutzman	Republican	January 3, 2025 – present	3rd	Elected in 2024. Incumbent.
Arthur H. Taylor	Democratic	March 4, 1893 – March 4, 1895	1st	Elected in 1892. Lost re-election to Hemenway.
John Test	Democratic-Republican	March 4, 1823 – March 4, 1825	3rd	Elected in 1822. Switched parties.
John Test	Anti-Jacksonian	March 4, 1825 – March 4, 1827	3rd	Re-elected in 1824 as an Anti-Jacksonian. Lost re-election to O. Smith.
John Test	Anti-Jacksonian	March 4, 1829 – March 4, 1831	3rd	Elected in 1828. Lost re-election to McCarty.
Jesse Burgess Thomas	Democratic-Republican	October 22, 1808 – March 3, 1809	Territory	Elected to finish the vacant term. Moved to Illinois Territory.
Richard W. Thompson	Whig	March 4, 1841 – March 4, 1843	2nd	Elected in 1841. Retired.
Richard W. Thompson	Whig	March 4, 1847 – March 4, 1849	7th	Elected in 1847. Renominated but declined to run.
Robert J. Tracewell	Republican	March 4, 1895 – March 4, 1897	3rd	Elected in 1894. Lost re-election to Zenor.
James Noble Tyner	Republican	March 4, 1869 – March 4, 1875	8th	Elected to the term left vacant by the resignation of Representative-elect Daniel D. Pratt. Lost renomination to Hunter.
Ralph E. Updike	Republican	March 4, 1925 – March 4, 1929	7th	Elected in 1924. Lost re-election to Ludlow.
Albert Henry Vestal	Republican	March 4, 1917 – April 1, 1932	8th	Elected in 1916. Died.
Pete Visclosky	Democratic	January 3, 1985 – January 3, 2021	1st	Elected in 1984. Retired.
Daniel W. Voorhees	Democratic	March 4, 1861 – February 23, 1866	7th	Elected in 1860. Lost contested election.
Daniel W. Voorhees	Democratic	March 4, 1869 – March 4, 1873	6th	Elected in 1868. Lost re-election to M. Hunter.
David Wallace	Whig	March 4, 1841 – March 4, 1843	6th	Elected in 1841. Redistricted to the 5th district and lost re-election to W. J. Brown.
Jackie Walorski	Republican	January 3, 2013 – August 3, 2022	2nd	Elected in 2012. Died.
John R. Walsh	Democratic	January 3, 1949 – January 3, 1951	5th	Elected in 1948. Lost re-election to Beamer.
Fred Wampler	Democratic	January 3, 1959 – January 3, 1961	6th	Elected in 1958. Lost re-election to Roudebush.
Thomas B. Ward	Democratic	March 4, 1883 – March 4, 1887	9th	Elected in 1882. Retired.
Henry D. Washburn	Republican	February 23, 1866 – March 4, 1869	7th	Won contested election. Retired.
James Eli Watson	Republican	March 4, 1895 – March 4, 1897	4th	Elected in 1894. Retired.
James Eli Watson	Republican	March 4, 1899 – March 4, 1909	6th	Elected in 1898. Retired to run for Governor of Indiana.
Daniel W. Waugh	Republican	March 4, 1891 – March 4, 1895	9th	Elected in 1890. Retired.
Albert S. White	Whig	March 4, 1837 – March 4, 1839	7th	Elected in 1837. Retired to run for U.S. Senator.
Albert S. White	Republican	March 4, 1861 – March 4, 1863	8th	Elected in 1860. Retired.
James B. White	Republican	March 4, 1887 – March 4, 1889	12th	Elected in 1886. Lost re-election to McClellan.
Joseph L. White	Whig	March 4, 1841 – March 4, 1843	3rd	Elected in 1841. Redistricted to the 2nd district and lost re-election to Henley.
Michael D. White	Republican	March 4, 1877 – March 4, 1879	9th	Elected in 1876. Retired.
William W. Wick	Democratic	March 4, 1839 – March 4, 1841	6th	Elected in 1839. Retired.
William W. Wick	Democratic	March 4, 1845 – March 4, 1849	5th district	Elected in 1845. Retired.
James D. Williams	Democratic	March 4, 1875 – December 1, 1876	2nd	Elected in 1874. Retired to run for Governor of Indiana and resigned when elected.
William Williams	Republican	March 4, 1867 – March 4, 1873	10th	Elected in 1866. Redistricted to the at-large district.
William Williams	Republican	March 4, 1873 – March 4, 1875	At-large	Redistricted from the 10th district and re-elected in 1872. Retired.
Earl Wilson	Republican	January 3, 1941 – January 3, 1959	9th	Elected in 1940. Lost re-election to Hogan.
Earl Wilson	Republican	January 3, 1961 – January 3, 1965	9th	Elected in 1960. Lost re-election to L. Hamilton.
James Wilson	Republican	March 4, 1857 – March 4, 1861	8th	Elected in 1856. Retired.
Jeremiah M. Wilson	Republican	March 4, 1871 – March 4, 1875	4th	Elected in 1870. Retired.
William E. Wilson	Democratic	March 4, 1923 – March 4, 1925	1st	Elected in 1922. Lost re-election to Rowbottom.
Simeon K. Wolfe	Democratic	March 4, 1873 – March 4, 1875	2nd	Elected in 1872. Retired.
Thomas J. Wood	Democratic	March 4, 1883 – March 4, 1885	10th	Elected in 1882. Lost re-election to W. Owen.
William R. Wood	Republican	March 4, 1915 – March 4, 1933	10th	Elected in 1914. Redistricted to the 2nd district and lost re-election to Durgan.
Joseph A. Wright	Democratic	March 4, 1843 – March 4, 1845	7th	Elected in 1843. Lost re-election to McGaughey.
Rudy Yakym	Republican	November 8, 2022 – present	2nd	Elected to finish Jackie Walorski's term. Incumbent.
Todd Young	Republican	January 3, 2011 – January 3, 2017	9th	Elected in 2010. Retired to run for U.S. Senator.
William T. Zenor	Democratic	March 4, 1897 – March 4, 1907	3rd	Elected in 1896. Retired.
Roger H. Zion	Republican	January 3, 1967 – January 3, 1975	8th	Elected in 1966. Lost re-election to Hayes.

== See also ==
- Indiana's congressional delegations
- Indiana's congressional districts
- List of United States senators from Indiana
