= Jason B. Brown =

American politician (1839–1898)

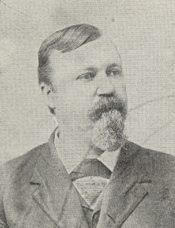

Member of the U.S. House of Representatives from Indiana's 3rd district
- In office March 4, 1889 – March 3, 1895
- Preceded by: Jonas G. Howard
- Succeeded by: Robert J. Tracewell

Secretary of Wyoming Territory
- In office 1873 – May 1, 1875
- President: Ulysses S. Grant

Member of the Indiana Senate
- In office 1870; 1880–1883

Member of the Indiana House of Representatives
- In office 1862–1866

Personal details
- Born: Jason Brevoort Brown; February 26, 1839 Dillsboro, Indiana, U.S.
- Died: March 10, 1898 (aged 59) Seymour, Indiana, U.S.
- Resting place: Riverview Cemetery, Seymour, Indiana
- Party: Democratic (before 1872; after 1875)
- Other political affiliations: Republican (1872–1875)
- Spouses: unknown first wife (m. 1860); Margaret F. Ross (m. 1863; died 1870); Nellie Ballard (m. early 1870s; divorced); Anna F. Shiel
- Children: 1
- Parent(s): Robert Delos Brown; Mary Hubbard Harwood
- Education: Wilmington Academy
- Occupation: Attorney

Jason Brevoort Brown (February 26, 1839 – March 10, 1898) was an American lawyer and politician from Indiana. A Democrat for most of his career, he served three terms in the United States House of Representatives from Indiana's 3rd congressional district from 1889 to 1895, and chaired the House Committee on Elections during the Fifty-third Congress. Earlier in his career he served in both houses of the Indiana General Assembly, where as a wartime legislator he initiated and led the Indiana House's 1863 investigation into arbitrary military arrests of civilians. After breaking with the Democratic Party in 1872, he was appointed Secretary of Wyoming Territory by President Ulysses S. Grant, serving from 1873 to 1875.

== Early life and education ==
Brown was born in Dillsboro, Dearborn County, Indiana, on February 26, 1839, the only child of Robert Delos Brown and his wife Mary Hubbard Harwood. His father, a native of Otsego County, New York, settled at Wilmington in Dearborn County in 1837, where he served as a magistrate for seventeen years beginning in 1843, was admitted to the bar at Lawrenceburg in 1852, and served as Indiana State Librarian in 1861–62. (Note: Obituary accounts garbled the elder Brown's name and record: the biographical portion of The Indianapolis News obituary named him "Robert D. Brown," while attorney W. P. Fishback, quoted in the same article, recalled him as "Delos R. Brown," state librarian "before the war," elected as a Republican or Free Soiler. The 1885 county history identifies him as Robert D. Brown of Hogan Township, gives his term as state librarian as 1861–62, and describes him as a Democrat.) Brown's mother died on December 16, 1839, when he was nine months old, and his father subsequently remarried; Brown had a half-sister and half-brother from his father's third marriage. Brown's left arm was permanently disabled by an injury suffered in infancy. He attended the common schools and Wilmington Academy in Dearborn County, and by one contemporary account began earning his own living at the age of twelve as a peddler of notions.

Brown studied law in the office of Cyrus L. Dunham, a former U.S. representative from Indiana's 3rd district, who according to a colleague's recollection educated the young Brown and, impressed by his ability as an advocate, took him into partnership while Brown was still in his teens. (Note: Accounts of Brown's legal training differ in their details. The Jackson County Banner reported that he began the study of law at nineteen in the office of "Cyrus L. Durham [sic], then secretary of state at Indianapolis"; an attorney quoted in The Indianapolis News placed Dunham's office, and the partnership, at Brownstown; and W. P. Fishback, quoted in the same article, recalled Brown as a student in the office of Gordon Tanner, the Indiana secretary of state.) He was admitted to the bar in 1860 and opened a law office in Brownstown, the seat of Jackson County, where he resided for about ten years. He went on to practice before many courts in Indiana, including the state supreme court, and in other states.

== Civil War–era politics ==
Brown was elected to the Indiana House of Representatives in 1862 and reelected in 1864, serving until 1866. A Democrat during the American Civil War, he was a critic of wartime restrictions on civil liberties under the administration of Republican governor Oliver P. Morton. On September 5, 1862, in the weeks before that fall's state election, Brown delivered a public speech at Seymour, after which Lieutenant Joseph Bosler, a recruiting officer of the 15th Indiana Volunteers, filed a charge with the state adjutant general accusing Brown of using "treasonable language" in public against the United States government. According to the account in the Democratic Indiana State Sentinel, which printed the text of the charge, Brown warned that any attempt to arrest him while he was speaking would be made at the officer's peril, finished his speech, and then accompanied the arresting officer by rail to Indianapolis, where the deputy United States marshal declined to entertain the charge and released him on condition that he report back should the marshal later wish to investigate. The Sentinel presented the arrest as part of a Republican effort to intimidate Democratic voters before the election, and noted that among the witnesses named on the charge was John F. Carr, whom it identified as Brown's political opponent. The charge was dismissed without trial.

On January 9, 1863, at the opening of the legislative session, the Indiana House adopted resolutions offered by Brown declaring that arrests of citizens without due process violated the constitutional guarantees of freedom of speech, freedom of the press, and the writ of habeas corpus, and creating a select Committee on Arbitrary Arrests to investigate such arrests in Indiana. The Speaker named Brown at the head of the committee, whose members also included Jonas G. Howard, Brown's eventual predecessor in Congress. The committee's report, ordered printed in an edition of five thousand copies, condemned the arrests and placed responsibility for them on the Morton administration.

In 1868, Brown was one of Indiana's Democratic presidential electors for the state at large. During the same period, according to a colleague's account, Brown was employed by the authorities in the prosecution of the Reno Gang, the Jackson County train robbers whose members were lynched by vigilance committees in 1868, and he was never an attorney for the Renos.

== Party break and Wyoming Territory ==
Brown was elected to the Indiana Senate in 1870 from a district comprising Jackson and Brown counties. In 1872, although he had been elected as a Democrat, he refused to support the Democratic national and state tickets, and from then until 1875 he affiliated with the Republican Party.

In 1873, President Ulysses S. Grant appointed Brown Secretary of the Territory of Wyoming, a post he held until his resignation on May 1, 1875, when he returned to Jackson County and settled at Seymour.

== Return to Indiana ==
Brown resumed the practice of law in Seymour and returned to the Democratic Party. In 1880 he was again elected to the Indiana Senate, this time from a district comprising Jackson and Jennings counties, serving until 1883.

== Congress ==
Brown was elected as a Democrat to the Fifty-first Congress in 1888 and was reelected to the Fifty-second and Fifty-third Congresses, serving from March 4, 1889, to March 3, 1895. During the Fifty-third Congress he served as chairman of the Committee on Elections. He sought a fourth term in 1894 but was defeated for renomination by Strother M. Stockslager of Corydon, who in turn lost the general election to Republican Robert J. Tracewell, also of Corydon.

== Later life and death ==
After leaving Congress, Brown resumed his law practice in Seymour. He suffered for some months from a liver ailment, though his condition was not considered alarming until his final days, and he died at his home in Seymour late in the evening of March 10, 1898, at the age of 59. Funeral services were held at the Presbyterian church in Seymour, and he was interred in Riverview Cemetery.

== Personal life ==
Brown was married four times. His first marriage took place in 1860, to a wife whose name his obituaries were unable to supply. On November 14, 1863, he married Margaret F. Ross of Charlestown, the youngest daughter of John F. Ross, a longtime circuit judge; the couple lived at Brownstown and had a daughter, Margaret Ross Brown. Margaret F. Brown died at Charlestown on September 10, 1870, at the age of 34. (Note: The Jackson County Banner's 1898 obituary, written twenty-eight years after the fact, gave the date of Brown's second marriage as "about 1866"; the contemporary death notice in the Seymour Times records the marriage as taking place on November 14, 1863.) In the early 1870s Brown married Nellie Ballard, whom he divorced; his fourth wife, Anna F. Shiel, survived him, as did his daughter.

Margaret Ross Brown, named for her mother, became a longtime schoolteacher in Seymour, where she died in 1944. Margaret R. Brown Elementary School in Seymour is named in her honor.

== Notes ==
U.S. House of Representatives
Preceded by Jonas G. Howard	Member of the U.S. House of Representatives from Indiana's 3rd congressional district 1889–1895	Succeeded by Robert J. Tracewell
