= Thurman C. Crook =

American politician (1891–1981)

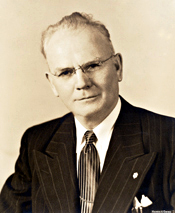

Member of the U.S. House of Representatives from Indiana's 3rd district
- In office January 3, 1949 – January 3, 1951
- Preceded by: Robert A. Grant
- Succeeded by: Shepard J. Crumpacker Jr.

Member of the Indiana House of Representatives
- In office 1939-1943

Member of the Indiana Senate
- In office 1943-47

Personal details
- Born: Thurman Charles Crook; July 18, 1891 Peru, Indiana, U.S.
- Died: October 23, 1981 (aged 90) Rochester, Indiana, U.S.
- Party: Democratic
- Education: Indiana State University; Purdue University; Valparaiso University

Thurman Charles Crook (July 18, 1891 – October 23, 1981) was an American politician who served one term as a United States representative from Indiana from 1949 to 1951.

== Biography ==
Thurman Crook was born at a farm near Peru, Indiana and attended the Cass County schools, Logansport High School, Indiana State University, Purdue University, Indiana University, before graduating from Valparaiso University in 1930. He learned the carpentry and cement trades, and later taught departmental work and coached athletics in Indiana high schools from 1913 to 1948.

Crook wrote a book in 1928 entitled Mechanical Drawing, a Textbook for Beginners, which was published by the McGraw-Hill book company.

Later, he became a fruit grower near Logansport, Indiana from 1924 to 1947.

=== Political career ===
Crook was a member of the Indiana House of Representatives from 1939 to 1943, and then served in the Indiana Senate from 1943 to 1947.

He was an unsuccessful candidate for the Democratic nomination in 1946 to the Eightieth Congress. Crook was elected as a Democrat to the Eighty-first Congress (January 3, 1949 – January 3, 1951) but he was an unsuccessful candidate for reelection in 1950 to the Eighty-second Congress and for election in 1956 to the Eighty-fifth Congress.

=== Later career and death ===
After leaving Congress, Crook worked as a farmer, horticulturist, and sheep raiser. He was a resident of Macy, Indiana until his death in Rochester, Indiana in 1981 at age 90.

U.S. House of Representatives
Preceded by Robert A. Grant	Member of the U.S. House of Representatives from Indiana's 3rd congressional district 1949–1951	Succeeded by Shepard J. Crumpacker, Jr.
