= William E. Cox =

American politician (1861–1942)

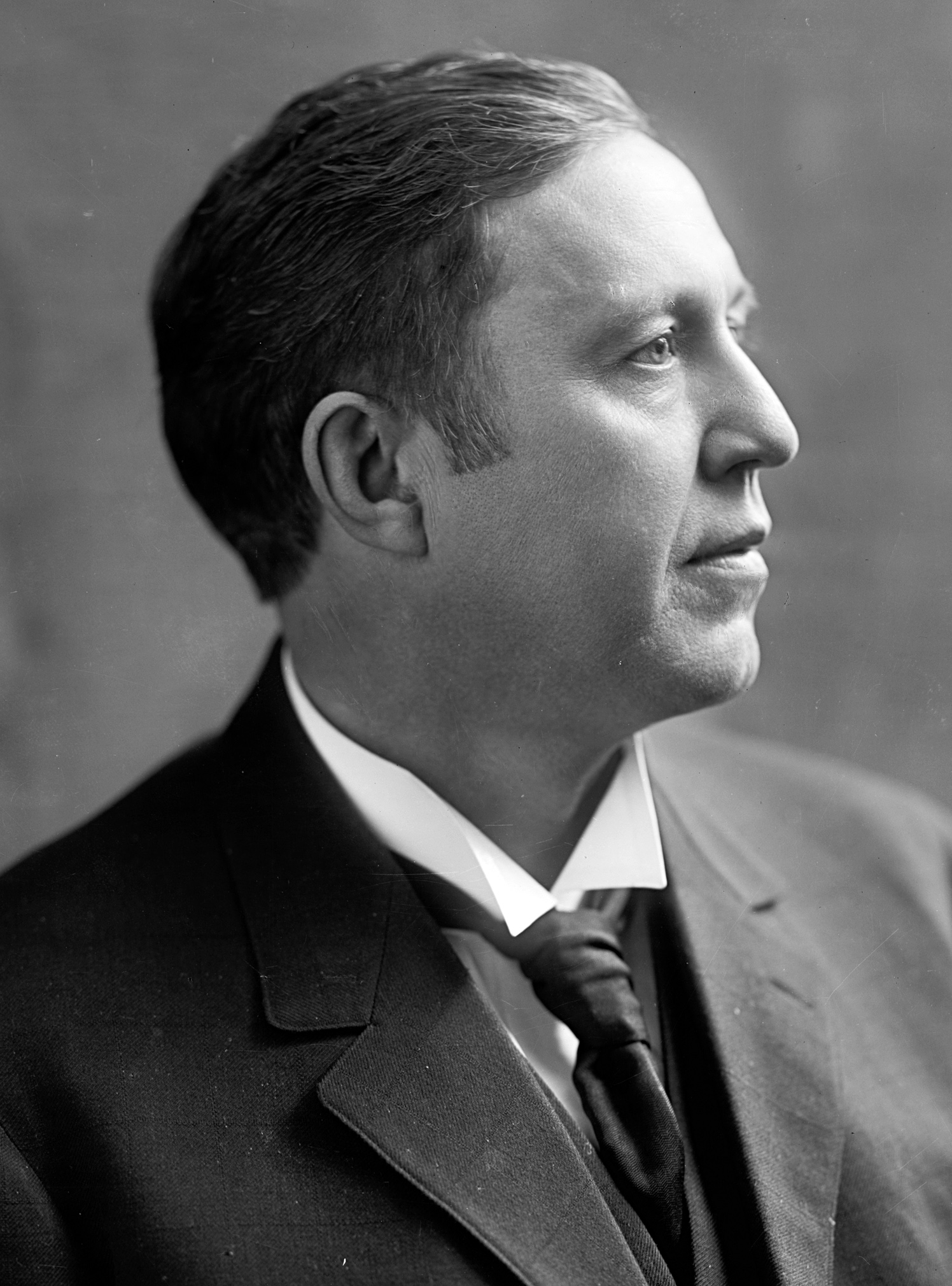
- Cox, 1905–1942

Member of the U.S. House of Representatives from Indiana's 3rd district
- In office March 4, 1907 – March 3, 1919
- Preceded by: William T. Zenor
- Succeeded by: James W. Dunbar

Personal details
- Born: William Elijah Cox; September 6, 1861 Birdseye, Indiana
- Died: March 11, 1942 (aged 80) Jasper, Indiana
- Party: Democratic
- Education: Cumberland University

William Elijah Cox (September 6, 1861 – March 11, 1942) was an American lawyer and politician who served six terms as a U.S. representative from Indiana from 1907 to 1919.

== Early life and career ==
Born on a farm near Birdseye, Indiana, Cox attended the common and high schools of Huntingburg and Jasper, Indiana. He graduated from Lebanon University, Tennessee, in 1888. He then went to the law department of the University of Michigan at Ann Arbor from which he graduated in 1889.

He was admitted to the bar July 10, 1889, and commenced practice at Rockport, Indiana, moving to Jasper, Indiana, later in the same year. He served as prosecuting attorney for the eleventh judicial district of Indiana 1892–1898.

== Congress ==
Cox was elected as a Democrat to the Sixtieth and to the five succeeding Congresses (March 4, 1907 – March 3, 1919). He served as chairman of the Committee on Expenditures in the Department of the Treasury (Sixty-second Congress). He was an unsuccessful candidate for reelection in 1918 to the Sixty-sixth Congress.

== Later career and death ==
He resumed the practice of law and also was engaged with a desk-manufacturing company, serving as president at the time of his death.

He died in Jasper, Indiana, March 11, 1942. He was interred in Fairmount Cemetery, Huntingburg, Indiana.

U.S. House of Representatives
Preceded by William T. Zenor	Member of the U.S. House of Representatives from Indiana's 3rd congressional district 1907–1919	Succeeded by James W. Dunbar
