= James W. Dunbar =

American politician (1860–1943)

James Whitson Dunbar
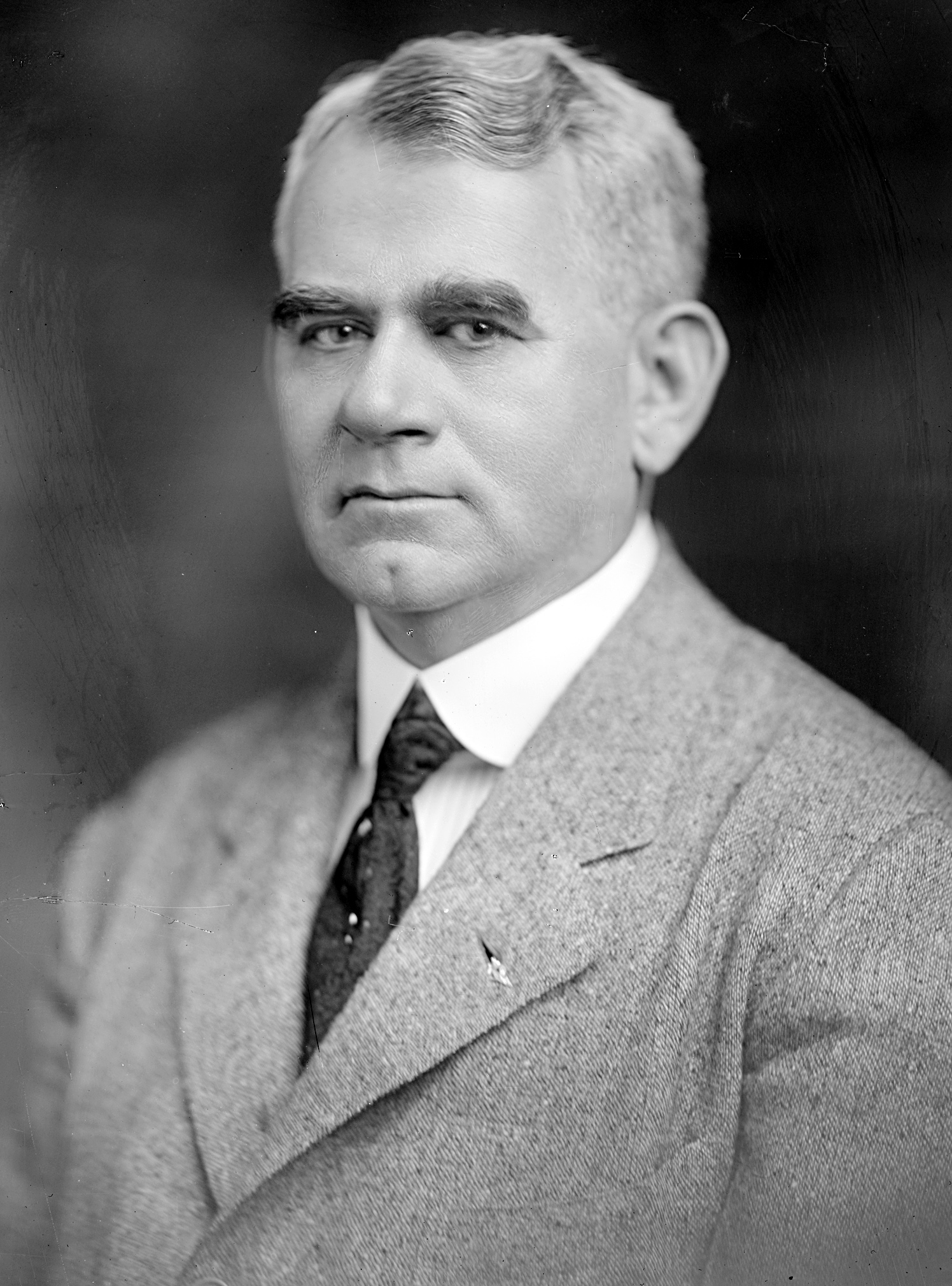

Member of the U.S. House of Representatives from Indiana's 3rd district
- In office March 4, 1919 – March 3, 1923
- Preceded by: William E. Cox
- Succeeded by: Frank Gardner
- In office March 4, 1929 – March 3, 1931
- Preceded by: Frank Gardner
- Succeeded by: Eugene B. Crowe

Personal details
- Born: October 17, 1860 New Albany, Indiana, U.S.
- Died: May 19, 1943 (aged 82) New Albany, Indiana, U.S.
- Party: Republican

James Whitson Dunbar (October 17, 1860 – May 19, 1943) was a U.S. representative from Indiana. He served a total of three terms from 1919 to 1923 and from 1929 to 1931.

== Early life and career ==
Born in New Albany, Indiana, Dunbar attended the public schools and graduated from New Albany High School in 1878. He engaged in mercantile pursuits. Manager of public utilities in New Albany and Jeffersonville. Secretary-treasurer of the Western Gas Association 1894–1906. Secretary of the American Gas Institute 1906–1909. He served as president of the Indiana Gas Association 1908-1910 and secretary 1914–1919.

== Politics ==
Dunbar was elected as a Republican to the Sixty-sixth and Sixty-seventh Congresses (March 4, 1919 – March 3, 1923). He was not a candidate for reelection in 1922.

Dunbar was elected to the Seventy-first Congress (March 4, 1929 – March 3, 1931). He was an unsuccessful candidate for reelection in 1930 to the Seventy-second Congress. He resumed his former business pursuits.

== Death and burial ==
Dunbar died in New Albany, Indiana on May 19, 1943. He was interred in Fairview Cemetery.

U.S. House of Representatives
Preceded by William E. Cox	Member of the U.S. House of Representatives from Indiana's 3rd congressional district 1919–1923	Succeeded by Frank Gardner
Preceded by Frank Gardner	Member of the U.S. House of Representatives from Indiana's 3rd congressional district 1929–1931	Succeeded by Eugene B. Crowe
