= William T. Zenor =

American politician (1846–1916)

William Zenor
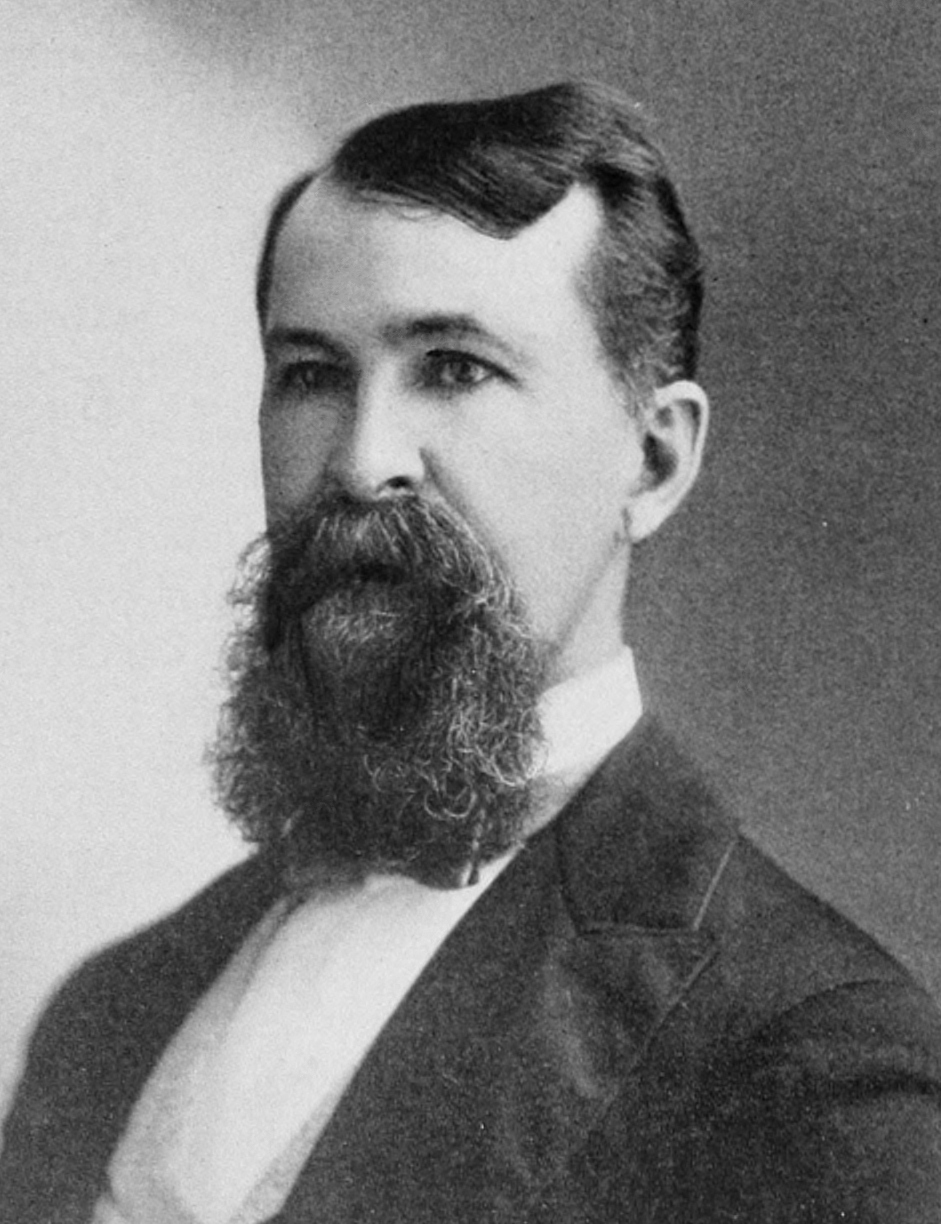

Member of the U.S. House of Representatives from Indiana's 3rd district
- In office March 4, 1897 – March 3, 1907
- Preceded by: Robert J. Tracewell
- Succeeded by: William E. Cox

Personal details
- Born: William Taylor Zenor; May 30, 1846 Corydon, Indiana, U.S.
- Died: June 2, 1916 (aged 70) New Albany, Indiana, U.S
- Resting place: Cedar Hill Cemetery, Corydon, Indiana
- Party: Democratic

William Taylor Zenor (April 30, 1846 – June 2, 1916) was an American lawyer, jurist, and politician who served five terms as a United States representative from Indiana from 1897 to 1907.

== Biography ==
He was born near Corydon, Indiana and attended the common schools and the James G. May Seminary. He also studied law in New Albany, Indiana and was admitted to the bar in 1870 and commenced practice in Corydon.

=== Early career ===
He moved to Leavenworth, Crawford County, Indiana in 1871 and continued the practice of law.

Zenor was the prosecuting attorney of Crawford and Harrison Counties from 1879 to 1885. He was the judge of the third judicial circuit from 1885 to 1897.

=== Congress ===
He was elected as a Democrat to the Fifty-fifth and to the four succeeding Congresses (March 4, 1897 - March 3, 1907).

=== Later career and death ===
He resumed the practice of law in Corydon, Indiana after leaving Congress and moved to New Albany, Indiana in 1910.

He continued the practice of law until his death there on June 2, 1916, aged 70. He was buried in Cedar Hill Cemetery, Corydon, Indiana.

U.S. House of Representatives
Preceded by Robert J. Tracewell	Member of the U.S. House of Representatives from Indiana's 3rd congressional district 1897–1907	Succeeded by William E. Cox
