= George A. Bicknell =

American politician (1815–1891)

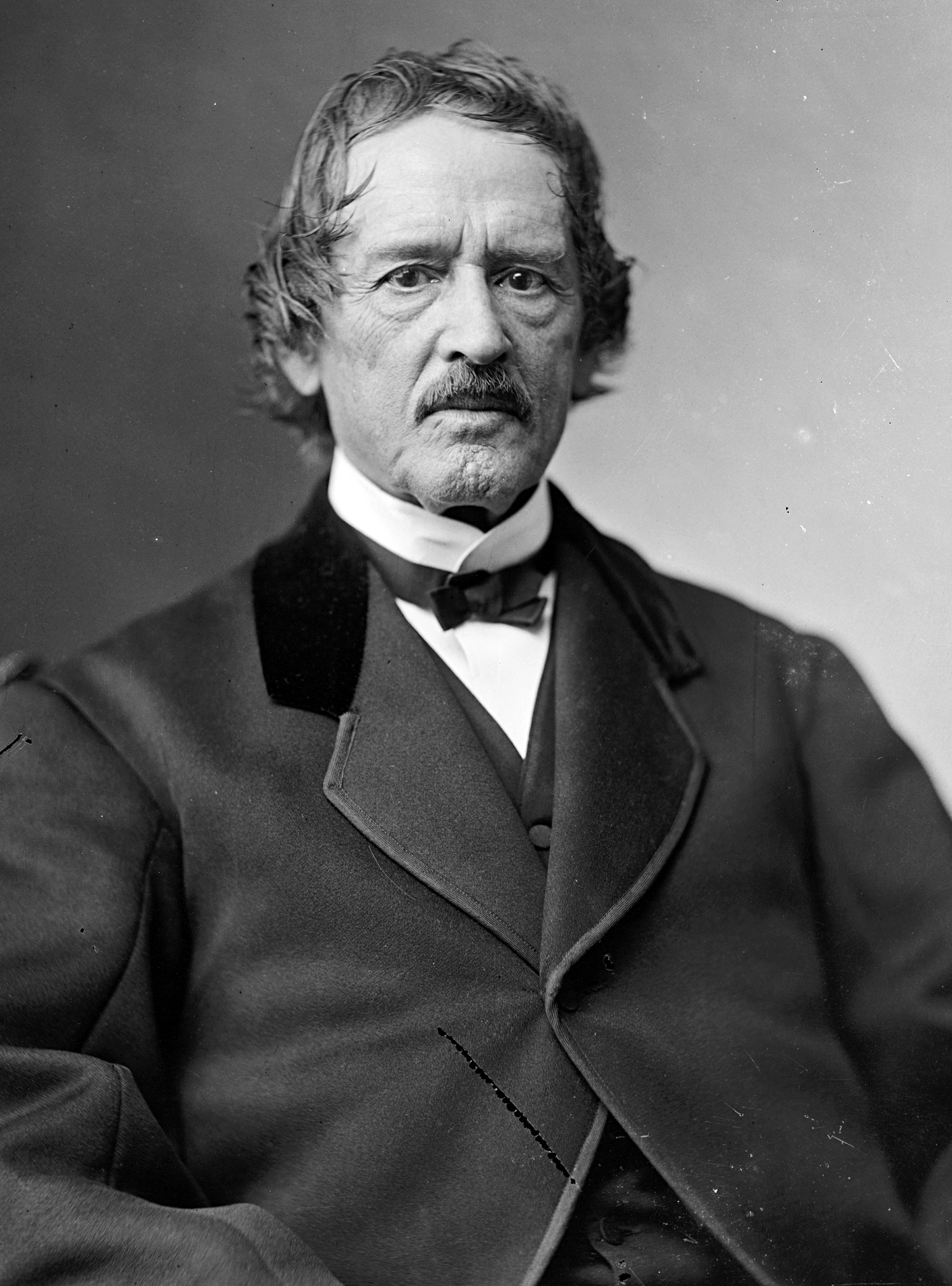

Member of the U.S. House of Representatives from Indiana's 3rd district
- In office March 4, 1877 – March 3, 1881
- Preceded by: Nathan T. Carr
- Succeeded by: Strother M. Stockslager

Personal details
- Born: February 6, 1815 Philadelphia, Pennsylvania, U.S.
- Died: April 11, 1891 (aged 76) New Albany, Indiana, U.S.
- Resting place: Fairview Cemetery, Indiana, U.S.
- Party: Democratic
- Education: University of Pennsylvania; Yale University

George Augustus Bicknell (February 6, 1815 – April 11, 1891) was an American lawyer and politician who served two terms as a U.S. representative from Indiana from 1877 to 1881.

== Early life and career ==
Born in Philadelphia, Pennsylvania, Bicknell graduated from the University of Pennsylvania in 1831. He completed the study of law at Yale Law School. He was admitted to the bar in 1836 and commenced practice in New York City before moving to Lexington, Indiana, in 1846.

=== Family ===
He married Elizabeth Haskins Richards (November 13, 1816 - July 1, 1909), daughter of Jesse and Sarah Haskins Richards of Batsto, New Jersey.(1) They had at least two sons (Jesse Richards Bicknell and Admiral George Augustus Bicknell, III) and two daughters (Martha Haskins Richards Bicknell Mahon and Emma Valeria Pintard Bicknell Love). (2)

=== Legal and teaching career ===
Bicknell was elected prosecuting attorney of Scott County in 1848 and then circuit prosecutor in 1850. He moved to New Albany in 1851. He served as judge of the second judicial circuit of Indiana 1852–1876, and was also a professor of law at Indiana University 1861–1870.

== Congress ==
Bicknell was elected as a Democrat to the Forty-fifth and Forty-sixth Congresses (March 4, 1877 – March 3, 1881). He was an unsuccessful candidate for renomination in 1880.

== Later career and death ==
He was appointed commissioner of appeals in the supreme court of Indiana in 1881, the office which he held until the completion of its work in 1885, after which he resumed the practice of law.

Bicknell was elected judge of the circuit court of Indiana in 1889 and held that office until his death, April 11, 1891, in New Albany, Indiana. He was interred in Fairview Cemetery.

U.S. House of Representatives
Preceded by Nathan T. Carr	Member of the U.S. House of Representatives from Indiana's 3rd congressional district 1877-1881	Succeeded by Strother M. Stockslager
