= Indiana's 3rd congressional district =

U.S. House district for Indiana

Coordinates: 41°N 85°W

- Interactive map of district boundaries since January 3, 2023
- Representative: Marlin Stutzman; R–Howe
- Area: 3,239.8 mi^{2} (8,391 km^{2})
- Distribution: 65.14% urban; 34.86% rural
- Population (2025): 778,197
- Median household income: $71,994
- Ethnicity: 80.5% White; 6.7% Hispanic; 6.0% Black; 3.6% Two or more races; 2.6% Asian; 0.6% other
- Cook PVI: R+16

Indiana's 3rd congressional district is a congressional district in the U.S. state of Indiana. Based in Fort Wayne, the district takes in the northeastern part of the state. This district includes all of Adams, Allen, Blackford, DeKalb, Huntington, LaGrange, Noble, Steuben, Wells and Whitley counties, as well as northern Jay and northeast Kosciusko counties.

The district is currently represented by Republican Marlin Stutzman, who succeeded fellow Republican Jim Banks after the latter retired to run for Senate in 2024. Stutzman previously held in the same district from 2010 to 2017.

The district and its predecessors have typically been strongly Republican. It occasionally elected Democrats in the past, but the Democrats have not come close to winning it since 1994. Pockets of Democratic influence exist in Fort Wayne itself, which frequently elects Democratic mayors and occasionally sends Democrats to the state legislature. However, this is nowhere near enough to overcome the overwhelming Republican lean of the rest of the district.

== Recent election results from statewide races ==
Year	Office	Results
2008	President	McCain 55% - 43%
2012	President	Romney 63% - 37%
2012	Senate	Mourdock 53% - 41%
2012	Governor	Pence 58% - 39%
2016	President	Trump 64% - 30%
2016	Senate	Young 58% - 35%
2016	Governor	Holcomb 59% - 37%
2016	Attorney General	Hill 72% - 28%
2018	Senate	Braun 59% - 37%
2020	President	Trump 64% - 34%
2020	Governor	Holcomb 62% - 24%
2020	Attorney General	Rokita 66% - 34%
2022	Senate	Young 67% - 30%
2022	Treasurer	Elliott 68% - 32%
2022	Auditor	Klutz 68% - 29%
2022	Secretary of State	Morales 63% - 33%
2024	President	Trump 65% - 34%
2024	Senate	Banks 66% - 32%
2024	Governor	Braun 60% - 34%
2024	Attorney General	Rokita 65% - 35%

== Composition ==
For the 118th and successive Congresses (based on redistricting following the 2020 census), the district contains all or portions of the following counties and townships:

Adams County (12)

All 12 townships

Allen County (20)

All 20 townships

Blackford County (4)

All four townships

DeKalb County (15)

All 15 townships

Huntington County (12)

All 12 townships

Kosciusko County (4)

Tippecanoe, Turkey Creek, Washington, Wayne (part, also 2nd)

Jay County (12)

All 12 townships

LaGrange County (11)

All 11 townships

Noble County (13)

All 13 townships

Randolph County (7)

Franklin, Green, Jackson, Monroe, Ward, Wayne (part, also 6th; includes Union City), White River (part, also 6th; includes Winchester)

Steuben County (12)

All 12 townships

Wells County (9)

All nine townships

Whitley County (9)

All nine townships

== List of members representing the district ==
Member	Party	Years	Cong ress	Electoral history	Location
District created March 4, 1823
John Test (Brookville)	Democratic- Republican	March 4, 1823 – March 3, 1825	18th 19th	Elected in 1822. Re-elected in 1824. Lost re-election.	1823 – 1833; Dearborn, Decatur, Fayette, Franklin, Henry, Randolph, Ripley, Rush, Switzerland, Union, and Wayne
John Test (Brookville)	Anti- Jacksonian	March 4, 1825 – March 3, 1827	18th 19th	Elected in 1822. Re-elected in 1824. Lost re-election.	1823 – 1833; Dearborn, Decatur, Fayette, Franklin, Henry, Randolph, Ripley, Rush, Switzerland, Union, and Wayne
Oliver H. Smith (Connersville)	Jacksonian	March 4, 1827 – March 3, 1829	20th	Elected in 1826. Retired.	1823 – 1833; Dearborn, Decatur, Fayette, Franklin, Henry, Randolph, Ripley, Rush, Switzerland, Union, and Wayne
John Test (Lawrenceburg)	Anti- Jacksonian	March 4, 1829 – March 3, 1831	21st	Elected in 1828. Lost re-election.	1823 – 1833; Dearborn, Decatur, Fayette, Franklin, Henry, Randolph, Ripley, Rush, Switzerland, Union, and Wayne
Johnathan McCarty (Connersville)	Jacksonian	March 4, 1831 – March 3, 1833	22nd	Elected in 1831. Redistricted to the 5th district.	1823 – 1833; Dearborn, Decatur, Fayette, Franklin, Henry, Randolph, Ripley, Rush, Switzerland, Union, and Wayne
John Carr (Charlestown)	Jacksonian	March 4, 1833 – March 3, 1837	23rd 24th	Redistricted from the 2nd district and re-elected in 1833. Re-elected in 1835. Retired.	1833 – 1843 [data missing]
William Graham (Vallonia)	Whig	March 4, 1837 – March 3, 1839	25th	Elected in 1837. Lost re-election.	1833 – 1843 [data missing]
John Carr (Charlestown)	Democratic	March 4, 1839 – March 3, 1841	26th	Elected in 1839. Lost re-election.	1833 – 1843 [data missing]
Joseph L. White (Madison)	Whig	March 4, 1841 – March 3, 1843	27th	Elected in 1841. Redistricted to the 2nd district and lost re-election.	1833 – 1843 [data missing]
Thomas Smith (Versailles)	Democratic	March 4, 1843 – March 3, 1847	28th 29th	Elected in 1843. Re-elected in 1845. Retired.	1843 – 1853 [data missing]
John L. Robinson (Rushville)	Democratic	March 4, 1847 – March 3, 1853	30th 31st 32nd	Elected in 1847. Re-elected in 1849. Re-elected in 1851. Retired.	1843 – 1853 [data missing]
Cyrus L. Dunham (Salem)	Democratic	March 4, 1853 – March 3, 1855	33rd	Redistricted from the 2nd district and re-elected in 1852. Lost re-election.	1853 – 1863 [data missing]
George G. Dunn (Bedford)	People's	March 4, 1855 – March 3, 1857	34th	Elected in 1854. Retired.	1853 – 1863 [data missing]
James Hughes (Bloomington)	Democratic	March 4, 1857 – March 3, 1859	35th	Elected in 1856. Lost re-election.	1853 – 1863 [data missing]
William M. Dunn (Madison)	Republican	March 4, 1859 – March 3, 1863	36th 37th	Elected in 1858. Re-elected in 1860. Lost re-election.	1853 – 1863 [data missing]
Henry W. Harrington (Madison)	Democratic	March 4, 1863 – March 3, 1865	38th	Elected in 1862. Lost re-election.	1863 – 1873 [data missing]
Ralph Hill (Columbus)	Republican	March 4, 1865 – March 3, 1867	39th	Elected in 1864. Retired.	1863 – 1873 [data missing]
Morton C. Hunter (Bloomington)	Republican	March 4, 1867 – March 3, 1869	40th	Elected in 1866. Retired.	1863 – 1873 [data missing]
William S. Holman (Aurora)	Democratic	March 4, 1869 – March 3, 1875	41st 42nd 43rd	Redistricted from the 4th district and re-elected in 1868. Re-elected in 1870. Re-elected in 1872. Redistricted to the 5th district.	1863 – 1873 [data missing]
William S. Holman (Aurora)	Democratic	March 4, 1869 – March 3, 1875	41st 42nd 43rd	Redistricted from the 4th district and re-elected in 1868. Re-elected in 1870. Re-elected in 1872. Redistricted to the 5th district.	1873 – 1883 [data missing]
Michael C. Kerr (New Albany)	Democratic	March 4, 1875 – August 19, 1876	44th	Elected in 1874. Died.	1873 – 1883 [data missing]
Vacant		August 19, 1876 – December 5, 1876	44th		1873 – 1883 [data missing]
Nathan T. Carr (Columbus)	Democratic	December 5, 1876 – March 3, 1877	44th	Elected to finish Kerr's term. Was not candidate for full term.	1873 – 1883 [data missing]
George A. Bicknell (New Albany)	Democratic	March 4, 1877 – March 3, 1881	45th 46th	Elected in 1876. Re-elected in 1878. Lost renomination.	1873 – 1883 [data missing]
Strother M. Stockslager (Corydon)	Democratic	March 4, 1881 – March 3, 1885	47th 48th	Elected in 1880. Re-elected in 1882. Lost renomination.	1873 – 1883 [data missing]
Strother M. Stockslager (Corydon)	Democratic	March 4, 1881 – March 3, 1885	47th 48th	Elected in 1880. Re-elected in 1882. Lost renomination.	1883 – 1893 [data missing]
Jonas G. Howard (Jeffersonville)	Democratic	March 4, 1885 – March 3, 1889	49th 50th	Elected in 1884. Re-elected in 1886. Lost renomination.	1883 – 1893 [data missing]
Jason B. Brown (Seymour)	Democratic	March 4, 1889 – March 3, 1895	51st 52nd 53rd	Elected in 1888. Re-elected in 1890. Re-elected in 1892. Lost renomination.	1883 – 1893 [data missing]
Jason B. Brown (Seymour)	Democratic	March 4, 1889 – March 3, 1895	51st 52nd 53rd	Elected in 1888. Re-elected in 1890. Re-elected in 1892. Lost renomination.	1893 – 1903 [data missing]
Robert J. Tracewell (Corydon)	Republican	March 4, 1895 – March 3, 1897	54th	Elected in 1894. Lost re-election.	1893 – 1903 [data missing]
William T. Zenor (Corydon)	Democratic	March 4, 1897 – March 3, 1907	55th 56th 57th 58th 59th	Elected in 1896. Re-elected in 1898. Re-elected in 1900. Re-elected in 1902. Re-elected in 1904. Retired.	1893 – 1903 [data missing]
William T. Zenor (Corydon)	Democratic	March 4, 1897 – March 3, 1907	55th 56th 57th 58th 59th	Elected in 1896. Re-elected in 1898. Re-elected in 1900. Re-elected in 1902. Re-elected in 1904. Retired.	1903 – 1913 [data missing]
William E. Cox (Jasper)	Democratic	March 4, 1907 – March 3, 1919	60th 61st 62nd 63rd 64th 65th	Elected in 1906. Re-elected in 1908. Re-elected in 1910. Re-elected in 1912. Re-elected in 1914. Re-elected in 1916. Lost re-election.	1903 – 1913 [data missing]
William E. Cox (Jasper)	Democratic	March 4, 1907 – March 3, 1919	60th 61st 62nd 63rd 64th 65th	Elected in 1906. Re-elected in 1908. Re-elected in 1910. Re-elected in 1912. Re-elected in 1914. Re-elected in 1916. Lost re-election.	1913 – 1923 [data missing]
James W. Dunbar (New Albany)	Republican	March 4, 1919 – March 3, 1923	66th 67th	Elected in 1918. Re-elected in 1920. Retired.	1913 – 1923 [data missing]
Frank Gardner (Scottsburg)	Democratic	March 4, 1923 – March 3, 1929	68th 69th 70th	Elected in 1922. Re-elected in 1924. Re-elected in 1926. Lost re-election.	1923 – 1933 [data missing]
James W. Dunbar (New Albany)	Republican	March 4, 1929 – March 3, 1931	71st	Elected in 1928. Lost re-election.	1923 – 1933 [data missing]
Eugene B. Crowe (Bedford)	Democratic	March 4, 1931 – March 3, 1933	72nd	Elected in 1930. Redistricted to the 9th district.	1923 – 1933 [data missing]
Samuel B. Pettengill (South Bend)	Democratic	March 4, 1933 – January 3, 1939	73rd 74th 75th	Redistricted from the 13th district and re-elected in 1932. Re-elected in 1934. Re-elected in 1936. Retired.	1933 – 1943 [data missing]
Robert A. Grant (South Bend)	Republican	January 3, 1939 – January 3, 1949	76th 77th 78th 79th 80th	Elected in 1938. Re-elected in 1940. Re-elected in 1942. Re-elected in 1944. Re-elected in 1946. Lost re-election.	1933 – 1943 [data missing]
Robert A. Grant (South Bend)	Republican	January 3, 1939 – January 3, 1949	76th 77th 78th 79th 80th	Elected in 1938. Re-elected in 1940. Re-elected in 1942. Re-elected in 1944. Re-elected in 1946. Lost re-election.	1943 – 1953 [data missing]
Thurman C. Crook (South Bend)	Democratic	January 3, 1949 – January 3, 1951	81st	Elected in 1948. Lost re-election.	1943 – 1953 [data missing]
Shepard Crumpacker (South Bend)	Republican	January 3, 1951 – January 3, 1957	82nd 83rd 84th	Elected in 1950. Re-elected in 1952. Re-elected in 1954. Retired.	1943 – 1953 [data missing]
Shepard Crumpacker (South Bend)	Republican	January 3, 1951 – January 3, 1957	82nd 83rd 84th	Elected in 1950. Re-elected in 1952. Re-elected in 1954. Retired.	1953 – 1963 [data missing]
F. Jay Nimtz (South Bend)	Republican	January 3, 1957 – January 3, 1959	85th	Elected in 1956. Lost re-election.	1953 – 1963 [data missing]
John Brademas (South Bend)	Democratic	January 3, 1959 – January 3, 1981	86th 87th 88th 89th 90th 91st 92nd 93rd 94th 95th 96th	Elected in 1958. Re-elected in 1960. Re-elected in 1962. Re-elected in 1964. Re-elected in 1966. Re-elected in 1968. Re-elected in 1970. Re-elected in 1972. Re-elected in 1974. Re-elected in 1976. Re-elected in 1978. Lost re-election.	1953 – 1963 [data missing]
John Brademas (South Bend)	Democratic	January 3, 1959 – January 3, 1981	86th 87th 88th 89th 90th 91st 92nd 93rd 94th 95th 96th	Elected in 1958. Re-elected in 1960. Re-elected in 1962. Re-elected in 1964. Re-elected in 1966. Re-elected in 1968. Re-elected in 1970. Re-elected in 1972. Re-elected in 1974. Re-elected in 1976. Re-elected in 1978. Lost re-election.	1963 – 1973 [data missing]
John Brademas (South Bend)	Democratic	January 3, 1959 – January 3, 1981	86th 87th 88th 89th 90th 91st 92nd 93rd 94th 95th 96th	Elected in 1958. Re-elected in 1960. Re-elected in 1962. Re-elected in 1964. Re-elected in 1966. Re-elected in 1968. Re-elected in 1970. Re-elected in 1972. Re-elected in 1974. Re-elected in 1976. Re-elected in 1978. Lost re-election.	1973 – 1983 [data missing]
John P. Hiler (La Porte)	Republican	January 3, 1981 – January 3, 1991	97th 98th 99th 100th 101st	Elected in 1980. Re-elected in 1982. Re-elected in 1984. Re-elected in 1986. Re-elected in 1988. Lost re-election.	1973 – 1983 [data missing]
John P. Hiler (La Porte)	Republican	January 3, 1981 – January 3, 1991	97th 98th 99th 100th 101st	Elected in 1980. Re-elected in 1982. Re-elected in 1984. Re-elected in 1986. Re-elected in 1988. Lost re-election.	1983 – 1993 [data missing]
Tim Roemer (South Bend)	Democratic	January 3, 1991 – January 3, 2003	102nd 103rd 104th 105th 106th 107th	Elected in 1990. Re-elected in 1992. Re-elected in 1994. Re-elected in 1996. Re-elected in 1998. Re-elected in 2000. Retired.	1983 – 1993 [data missing]
Tim Roemer (South Bend)	Democratic	January 3, 1991 – January 3, 2003	102nd 103rd 104th 105th 106th 107th	Elected in 1990. Re-elected in 1992. Re-elected in 1994. Re-elected in 1996. Re-elected in 1998. Re-elected in 2000. Retired.	1993 – 2003 [data missing]
Mark Souder (Fort Wayne)	Republican	January 3, 2003 – May 21, 2010	108th 109th 110th 111th	Redistricted from the 4th district and re-elected in 2002. Re-elected in 2004. Re-elected in 2006. Re-elected in 2008. Ran for re-election, but resigned.	2003 – 2013 [data missing]
Vacant		May 21, 2010 – November 16, 2010	111th		2003 – 2013 [data missing]
Marlin Stutzman (Howe)	Republican	November 16, 2010 – January 3, 2017	111th 112th 113th 114th	Elected to finish Souder's term. Elected to full term in 2010. Re-elected in 2012. Re-elected in 2014. Retired to run for U.S. Senator.	2003 – 2013 [data missing]
Marlin Stutzman (Howe)	Republican	November 16, 2010 – January 3, 2017	111th 112th 113th 114th	Elected to finish Souder's term. Elected to full term in 2010. Re-elected in 2012. Re-elected in 2014. Retired to run for U.S. Senator.	2013 – 2023
Jim Banks (Columbia City)	Republican	January 3, 2017 – January 3, 2025	115th 116th 117th 118th	Elected in 2016. Re-elected in 2018. Re-elected in 2020. Re-elected in 2022. Retired to run for U.S. Senator.	2013 – 2023
Jim Banks (Columbia City)	Republican	January 3, 2017 – January 3, 2025	115th 116th 117th 118th	Elected in 2016. Re-elected in 2018. Re-elected in 2020. Re-elected in 2022. Retired to run for U.S. Senator.	2023 – present
Marlin Stutzman (Howe)	Republican	January 3, 2025 – present	119th	Elected in 2024. Re-elected in 2026.	2023 – present

== History ==
=== 2010 map ===
#	County	Seat	Population
1	Adams	Decatur	35,491
2	Allen	Fort Wayne	377,872
5	Blackford	Hartford City	12,766
17	DeKalb	Auburn	40,285
35	Huntington	Huntington	37,124
38	Jay	Portland	21,253
43	Kosciusko	Warsaw	77,358
44	LaGrange	LaGrange	37,128
57	Noble	Albion	47,536
76	Steuben	Angola	34,185
90	Wells	Bluffton	27,636
92	Whitley	Columbia City	33,292

- 5 Blackford County exists in both the 3rd and 5th congressional districts. One city, Montpelier, exists in the 3rd congressional district; and one city, Hartford City, exists in the 5th congressional district. One township, Harrison, exists in the 3rd congressional district; and three townships, Washington, Licking, and Jackson, exist in the 5th congressional district.
- 64 Kosciusko County exists in both the 2nd and 3rd congressional districts. Half of one city, Warsaw, exists in the 2nd and 3rd congressional districts; twelve townships, Clay, Etna, Franklin, Harrison, Jefferson, Lake, Plain, Prairie, Scott, Seward, Turkey Creek, Van Buren exist in the 2nd congressional district; and three townships, Jackson, Washington, and Wayne, exist in the 3rd congressional district. They are partitioned by Indiana S 1000 W35, North 200W and West 700N.

=== Cities of 10,000 or more people ===
(2010 census)

- Fort Wayne – 253,691
- New Haven – 15,709
- Huntington – 17,391
- Wabash – 10,666
- Warsaw – 13,559
- Auburn – 13,086

=== 2,500 – 10,000 people ===
(2010 census)

- Berne – 3,999
- Decatur – 9,405
- Huntertown – 4,810
- Leo-Cedarville – 3,603
- Hartford City – 6,220
- Butler, DeKalb County, Indiana – 2,684
- Garett, DeKalb County, Indiana – 6,286
- Grant Township – 3,245
- Jackson Township – 3,064
- Portland – 6,161
- LaGrange – 2,625
- Kendallville – 9,862
- Ligonier – 4,405
- Angola – 8,612
- Bluffton – 9,897
- Ossian – 3,289
- Columbia City – 8,750

== Election results ==
=== 2002 ===
Indiana's 3rd Congressional District election (2002)
Party	Candidate	Votes	%
Republican	Mark Souder	92,566	63.14
Democratic	Jay Rigdon	50,509	34.45
Libertarian	Michael Donlan	3,531	2.41
Total votes		146,606	100.00
Turnout			
Republican gain from Democratic			

=== 2004 ===
Indiana's 3rd Congressional District election (2004)
Party	Candidate	Votes	%
Republican	Mark Souder*	171,389	69.21
Democratic	Maria M. Parra	76,232	30.79
Total votes		247,621	100.00
Turnout			
Republican hold			

=== 2006 ===
Indiana's 3rd Congressional District election (2006)
Party	Candidate	Votes	%
Republican	Mark Souder*	95,421	54.29
Democratic	Thomas Hayhurst	80,357	45.71
Total votes		175,778	100.00
Turnout			
Republican hold			

=== 2008 ===
Indiana's 3rd Congressional District election (2008)
Party	Candidate	Votes	%
Republican	Mark Souder*	155,693	55.04
Democratic	Mike Montagano	112,309	39.66
Libertarian	Bill Larsen	14,877	5.30
Total votes		282,879	100.00
Turnout			
Republican hold			

=== 2010 ===
Indiana's 3rd Congressional District special election (2010)
Party	Candidate	Votes	%
Republican	Marlin Stutzman	115,415	62.65
Democratic	Thomas Hayhurst	60,880	33.05
Libertarian	Scott W. Wise	7,914	4.30
Total votes		184,209	100.00
Turnout			
Republican hold			

Indiana's 3rd Congressional District general election (2010)
Party	Candidate	Votes	%
Republican	Marlin Stutzman*	116,140	62.76
Democratic	Thomas Hayhurst	61,267	33.11
Libertarian	Scott W. Wise	7,631	4.12
No party	Others	11	0.01
Total votes		185,049	100.00
Turnout			
Republican hold			

=== 2012 ===
Indiana's 3rd Congressional District election (2012)
Party	Candidate	Votes	%
Republican	Marlin Stutzman*	187,872	67.04
Democratic	Kevin Boyd	92,363	32.96
Total votes		280,235	100.00
Turnout			60
Republican hold			

=== 2014 ===
Indiana's 3rd Congressional District election (2014)
Party	Candidate	Votes	%
Republican	Marlin Stutzman*	102,889	69.15
Democratic	Justin Kuhnle	39,771	26.73
Libertarian	Scott Wise	6,133	4.12
Total votes		148,793	100.00
Turnout			31
Republican hold			

=== 2016 ===
Indiana's 3rd Congressional District election (2016)
Party	Candidate	Votes	%
Republican	Jim Banks	201,396	70.11
Democratic	Tommy Schrader	66,023	22.98
Libertarian	Pepper Snyder	19,828	6.90
Total votes		287,247	100.00
Turnout			58
Republican hold			

=== 2018 ===
Indiana's 3rd Congressional District election (2018)
Party	Candidate	Votes	%
Republican	Jim Banks*	158,927	64.7
Democratic	Courtney Tritch	86,610	35.3
Total votes		245,537	100.0
Republican hold			

=== 2020 ===
Indiana's 3rd congressional district, 2020
Party	Candidate	Votes	%
Republican	Jim Banks*	220,989	67.8
Democratic	Chip Coldiron	104,762	32.2
Total votes		325,751	100.0
Republican hold			

=== 2022 ===
Indiana's 3rd congressional district (2022)
Party	Candidate	Votes	%
Republican	Jim Banks*	131,252	65.3
Democratic	Gary Snyder	60,312	30.0
Independent	Nathan Gotsch	9,354	4.7
Total votes		200,918	100.0
Republican hold			

=== 2024 ===
Indiana's 3rd congressional district (2024)
Party	Candidate	Votes	%
Republican	Marlin Stutzman*	202,643	65.0
Democratic	Kiley Adolph	97,871	31.4
Libertarian	Jarrad Lancaster	11,015	3.5
Total votes		311,539	100.0
Republican hold			

== Historical district boundaries ==
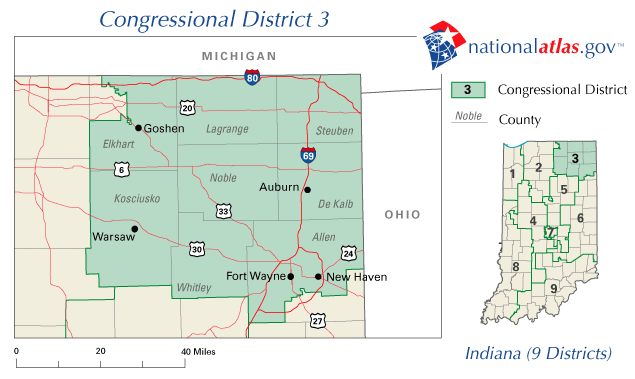
2003 – 2013

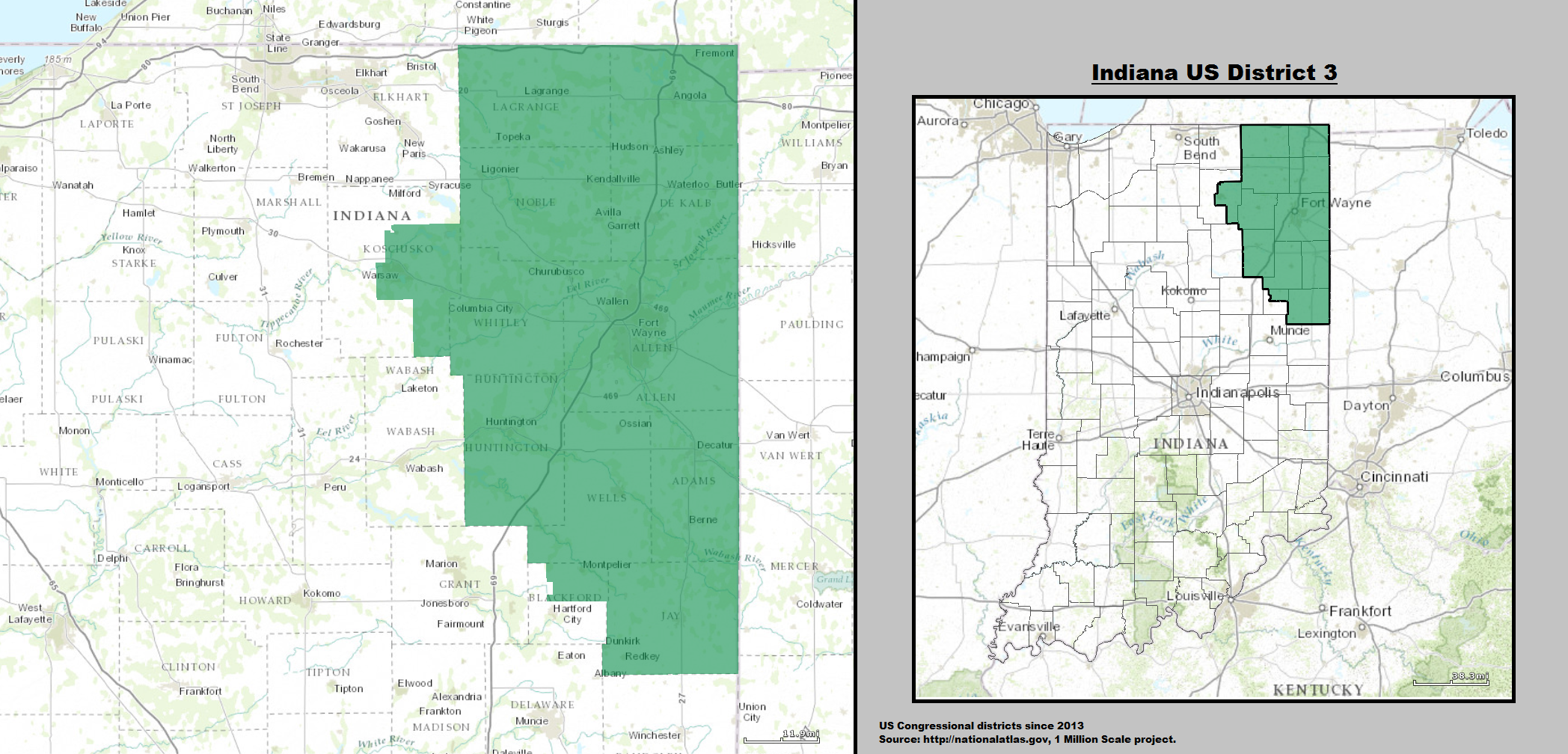
2013 – 2023

== See also ==
- Indiana's congressional districts
- List of United States congressional districts

U.S. House of Representatives
Preceded by Maine's 3rd congressional district	Home district of the speaker of the House; December 6, 1875 – August 19, 1876	Succeeded by Pennsylvania's 3rd congressional district
