= Eugene B. Crowe =

American politician (1878–1970)

Eugene Crowe
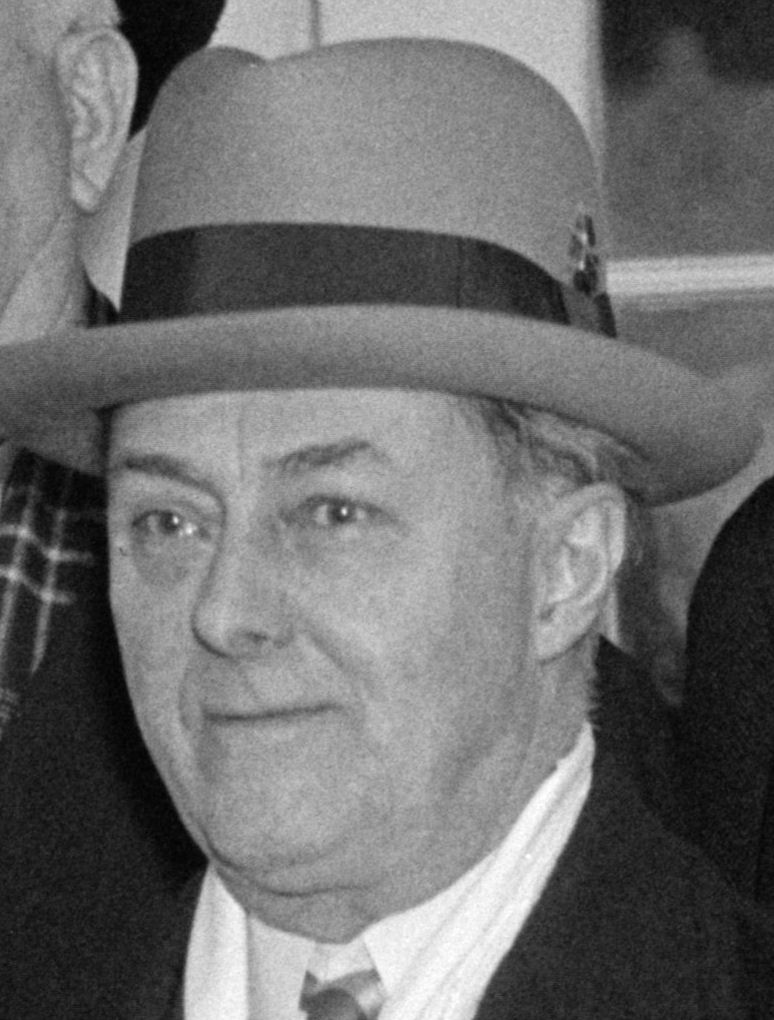

Member of the U.S. House of Representatives from Indiana's 3rd district
- In office March 4, 1931 – January 3, 1941
- Preceded by: James W. Dunbar
- Succeeded by: Robert A. Grant

Personal details
- Born: Eugene Burgess Crowe; January 5, 1878 Jeffersonville, Indiana
- Died: May 12, 1970 (aged 92) Indianapolis, Indiana
- Resting place: Green Hill Cemetery, Bedford, Indiana
- Party: Democratic

Eugene Burgess Crowe (January 5, 1878 – May 12, 1970) was an American businessman and politician who served five terms as a U.S. representative from Indiana from 1931 to 1941.

== Biography ==
Born near Jeffersonville, Indiana, Crowe attended the rural schools and Borden (Indiana) Academy. He taught in county schools 1894–1896. He moved to Bedford, Indiana, in 1899 and engaged in the retail furniture business, real estate, and banking. He served as delegate to the Democratic State conventions 1908–1960. He served as delegate to the Democratic National Conventions in 1928, 1944, 1948, 1952, 1956, and 1960. He served as delegate to the Interparliamentary Union Congress at Oslo, Norway, in 1939.

== Congress ==
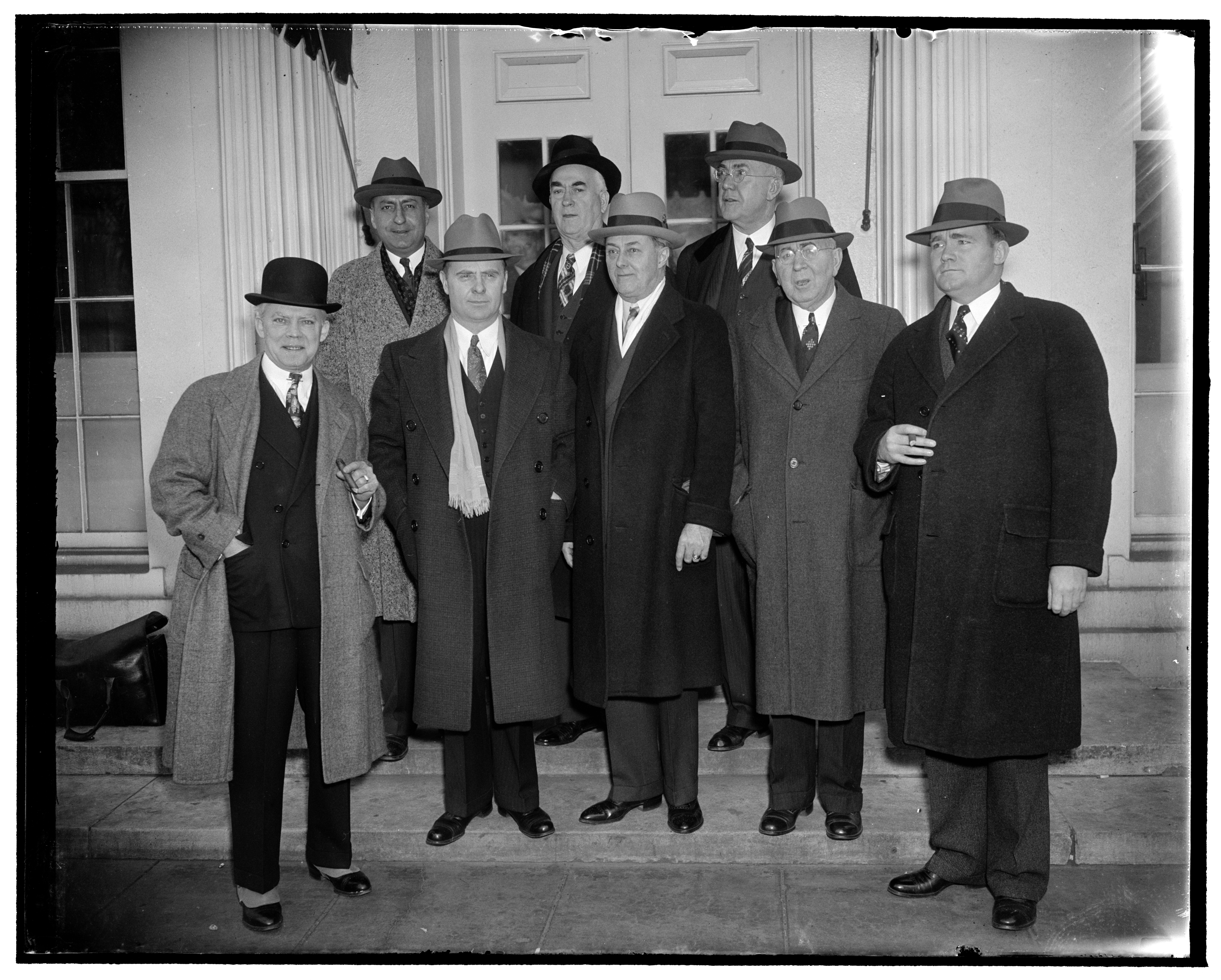
Group of legislators leaves White House after asking Franklin D. Roosevelt for $80,000,000 for flood control in Ohio Valley, March 7, 1938. front: l-r Joseph A. Dixon, James G. Polk, Eugene B. Crowe, G W Johnson, Lawrence E. Imhoff, rear l-r : Peter J. De Muth, Kent E. Keller, Brent Spence.

Crowe was elected as a Democrat to the Seventy-second and to the four succeeding Congresses (March 4, 1931 – January 3, 1941). He was an unsuccessful candidate for reelection in 1940 to the Seventy-seventh Congress.

== Later career and death ==
He resumed his former business interests. He served as president of Stone City National Bank and Greystone Hotel. He served as director of Wabash Fire and Casualty Insurance Co.. He remained active in business and civic affairs until his death in Indianapolis, Indiana, May 12, 1970. He was interred in Green Hill Cemetery, Bedford, Indiana.

U.S. House of Representatives
Preceded by James W. Dunbar	Member of the U.S. House of Representatives from Indiana's 3rd congressional district 1931–1933	Succeeded by Samuel B. Pettengill
Preceded by Fred S. Purnell	Member of the U.S. House of Representatives from Indiana's 9th congressional district 1933–1941	Succeeded by Earl Wilson
