= Michael C. Kerr =

American politician (1827–1876)

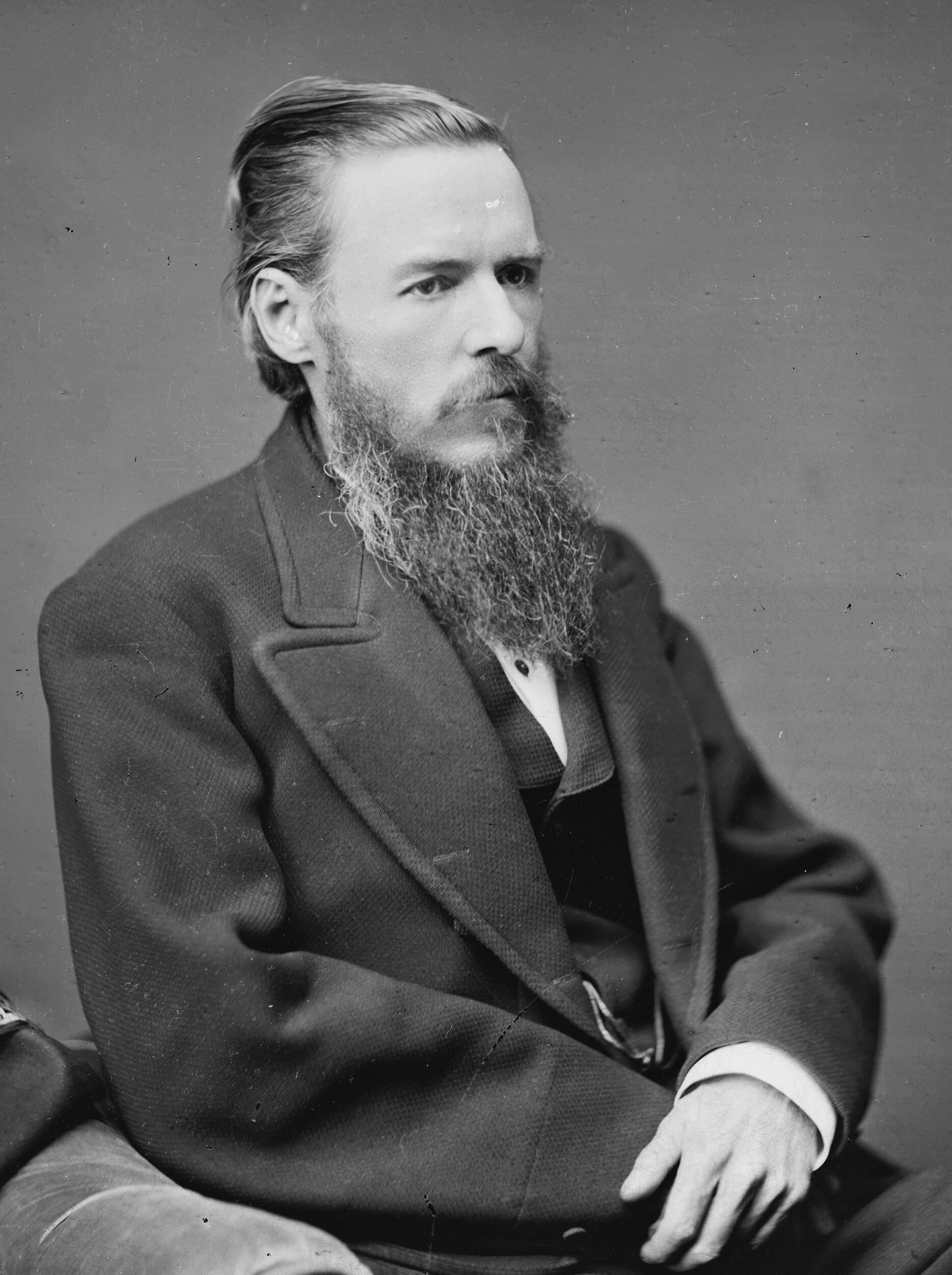
- Kerr, 1865–1876

28th Speaker of the United States House of Representatives
- In office December 6, 1875 – August 19, 1876
- Preceded by: James G. Blaine
- Succeeded by: Samuel J. Randall

Leader of the House Democratic Caucus
- In office December 6, 1875 – August 19, 1876
- Preceded by: James Lawrence Orr
- Succeeded by: Samuel J. Randall

Member of the U.S. House of Representatives from Indiana
- In office March 4, 1875 – August 19, 1876
- Preceded by: William S. Holman
- Succeeded by: Nathan T. Carr
- Constituency: 3rd district
- In office March 4, 1865 – March 3, 1873
- Preceded by: James A. Cravens
- Succeeded by: Simeon K. Wolfe
- Constituency: 2nd district

Member of the Indiana House of Representatives
- In office 1856–1857

Personal details
- Born: Michael Crawford Kerr; March 15, 1827 Titusville, Pennsylvania, U.S.
- Died: August 19, 1876 (aged 49) Rockbridge County, Virginia, U.S.
- Party: Democratic
- Education: University of Louisville
- Profession: Lawyer

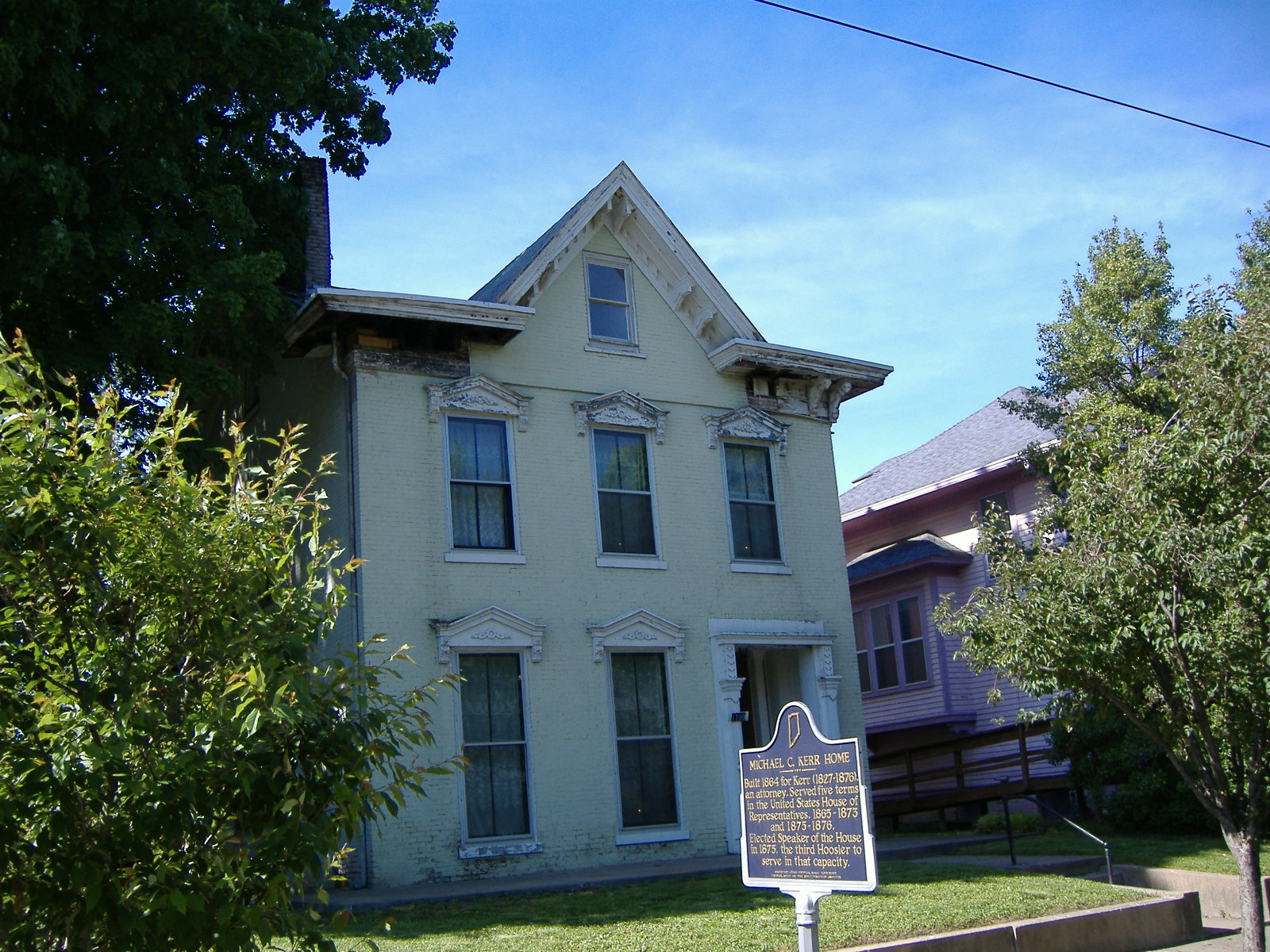
Kerr's home in New Albany, Indiana

Michael Crawford Kerr (March 15, 1827 – August 19, 1876) was an American lawyer and legislator who served as the first Democratic speaker of the United States House of Representatives after the Civil War.

== Early life ==
He was born at Titusville, Pennsylvania and educated at the Erie Academy. He graduated from the University of Louisville School of Law in 1851. He moved to New Albany, Indiana in 1852 and was a member of the State Legislature from 1856 to 1857.

== Political career ==
He was elected to Congress in 1864 as a War Democrat, having vigorously opposed the Copperhead element in his district. He won the praise of Republican Governor Oliver P. Morton for helping suppress illegal conspiracies by Copperheads.

Kerr served in the United States House of Representatives as a Democrat from Indiana from 1865 to 1873. In Congress he was looked upon as one of the leaders of the Democratic Party. He strongly opposed the Republican policy of Reconstruction in the Southern States. He was not re-elected in 1872.

His hard money views on financial questions did not meet with favor in his agrarian constituency, where he openly antagonized the inflationists and the Greenback element and favored the resumption of specie payments. In 1874, however, after a sharp contest he won the seat back, and on his re-entry into Congress was elected to the speakership. He presided as Speaker at only the first session of the Forty-fourth Congress and died of consumption shortly after its adjournment.

== See also ==
- List of members of the United States Congress who died in office (1790–1899)

== Bibliography ==
- Halsell, Willie D., ed. "Advice from Michael C. Kerr to a Reconstructed Rebel Congressman." Indiana Magazine of History 33 (September 1941): 257–61.
- Smith, William Henry. The history of the state of Indiana (1897) p. 798-800 online
- Stampp, Kenneth. Indiana politics during the Civil War (1949)

Political offices
Preceded by James G. Blaine	Speaker of the U.S. House of Representatives; December 6, 1875 – August 19, 1876	Succeeded by Samuel J. Randall
U.S. House of Representatives
Preceded by James A. Cravens	Member of the U.S. House of Representatives from Indiana's 2nd congressional district March 4, 1865 – March 3, 1873	Succeeded by Simeon K. Wolfe
Preceded by William S. Holman	Member of the U.S. House of Representatives from Indiana's 3rd congressional district March 4, 1875 – August 19, 1876	Succeeded by Nathan T. Carr
