= Nathan T. Carr =

American attorney and politician (1833–1885)

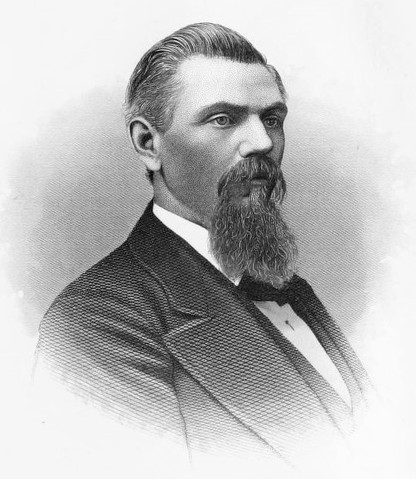

Member of the U.S. House of Representatives from Indiana's 3rd district
- In office December 5, 1876 – March 3, 1877
- Preceded by: Michael C. Kerr
- Succeeded by: George A. Bicknell

Personal details
- Born: December 25, 1833 Corning, New York
- Died: May 28, 1885 (aged 51) Columbus, Indiana
- Resting place: City Cemetery, Indiana, U.S.
- Party: Democratic

Nathan Tracy Carr (December 25, 1833 – May 28, 1885) was an American lawyer and Civil War veteran who served briefly as a U.S. representative from Indiana from 1876 to 1877.

== Biography ==
Born in Corning, New York, Carr attended the common schools, and was graduated from Starkey Academy in 1851. He moved to Midland County, Michigan. He studied law. He was admitted to the Midland County bar in 1858 and commenced practice at Vassar, Michigan. He served as member of the State house of representatives 1858–1860. Recorder of Midland County in 1861 and 1862.

He served as a first lieutenant in the 27th Regiment, Michigan Volunteer Infantry, from October 6, 1862; to his resignation on March 11, 1863. He moved to Columbus, Indiana, in 1867.

He served as prosecuting attorney for Bartholomew, Shelby, Jackson, and Brown Counties in 1870.

=== Congress ===
Carr was elected as a Democrat to the Forty-fourth Congress to fill the vacancy caused by the death of Michael C. Kerr and served from December 5, 1876, to March 3, 1877. He was an unsuccessful candidate for renomination in 1876.

=== Later career and death ===
He resumed the practice of law in Columbus, Indiana. He was appointed judge of the Ninth Judicial Circuit Court of Indiana in 1878.

He died in Columbus, Indiana, on May 28, 1885. He was interred in the City Cemetery.

U.S. House of Representatives
Preceded by Michael C. Kerr	Member of the U.S. House of Representatives from Indiana's 3rd congressional district 1876-1877	Succeeded by George A. Bicknell
