= Robert J. Tracewell =

American politician (1852–1922)

Robert John Tracewell
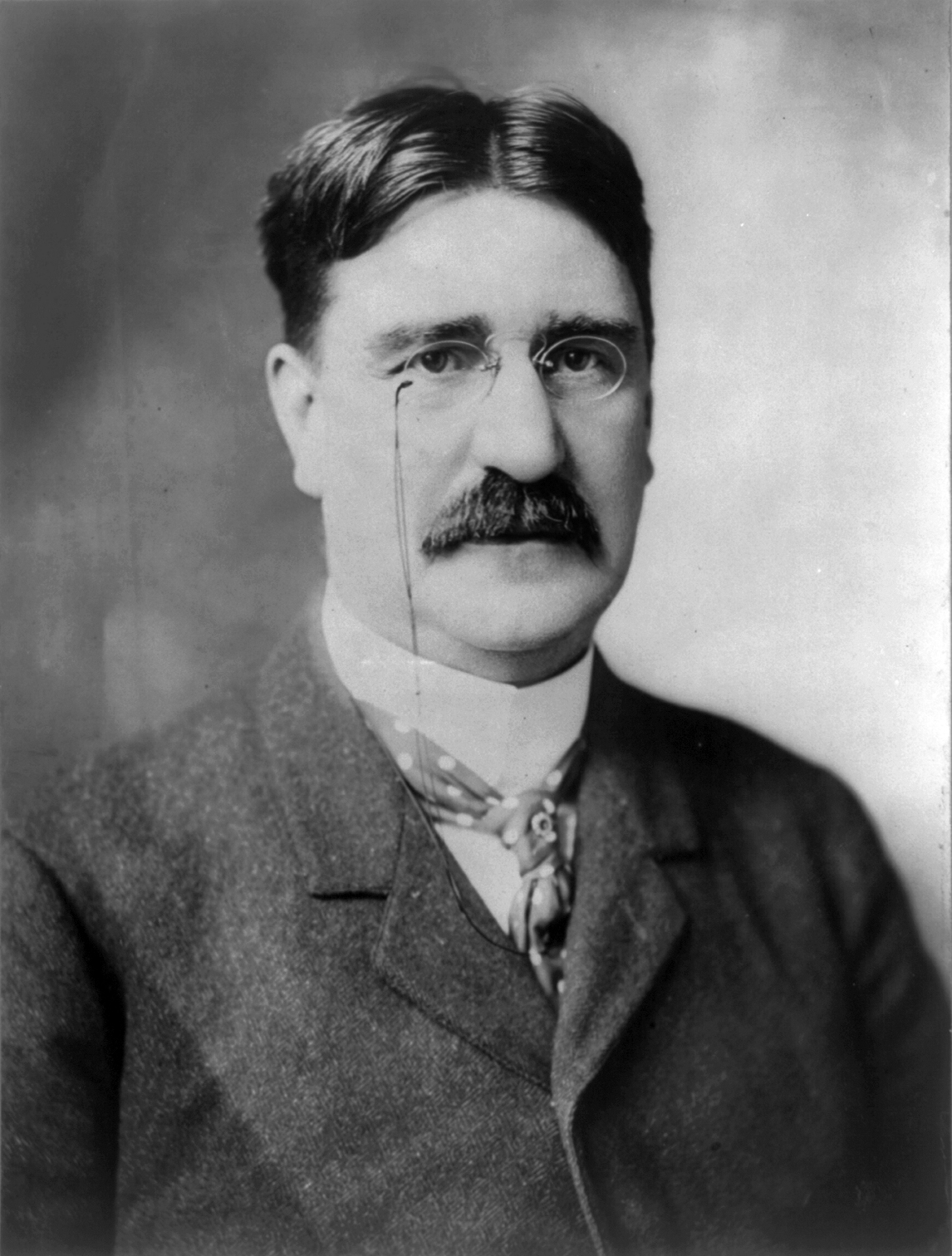

Member of the U.S. House of Representatives from Indiana's 3rd district
- In office March 4, 1895 – March 3, 1897
- Preceded by: Jason B. Brown
- Succeeded by: William T. Zenor

Personal details
- Born: May 7, 1852 Front Royal, Virginia, U.S.
- Died: July 28, 1922 (aged 70) Evansville, Indiana, U.S.
- Education: Hanover College

Robert John Tracewell (May 7, 1852 – July 28, 1922) was an American lawyer, jurist, and politician who served one term as a U.S. representative from Indiana from 1895 to 1897.

== Biography ==
Born near Front Royal, Virginia, Tracewell moved with his parents to Corydon, Indiana, in 1854. He attended the public schools of Corydon and was graduated from Hanover College in 1874. He studied law. He was admitted to the bar in 1875 and commenced practice in Corydon, Indiana.

=== Congress ===
Tracewell was elected as a Republican to the Fifty-fourth Congress (March 4, 1895 – March 3, 1897). He was an unsuccessful candidate for reelection in 1896 to the Fifty-fifth Congress.

=== Later career and death ===
He was appointed by President McKinley as Comptroller of the Treasury and served from March 4, 1897, to June 15, 1914, when he resigned. He moved to Evansville, Indiana, in 1914 and resumed the practice of law.

Tracewell was elected judge of the superior court of Vanderburg County, Indiana, in 1918. Renominated in 1922, but died in Evansville, Indiana, on July 28, 1922, before the election.

He was interred in Cedar Hill Cemetery, Corydon, Indiana.

U.S. House of Representatives
Preceded by Jason B. Brown	Member of the U.S. House of Representatives from Indiana's 3rd congressional district 1895–1897	Succeeded by William T. Zenor
