= Shepard J. Crumpacker Jr. =

American politician

Shepard Crumpacker
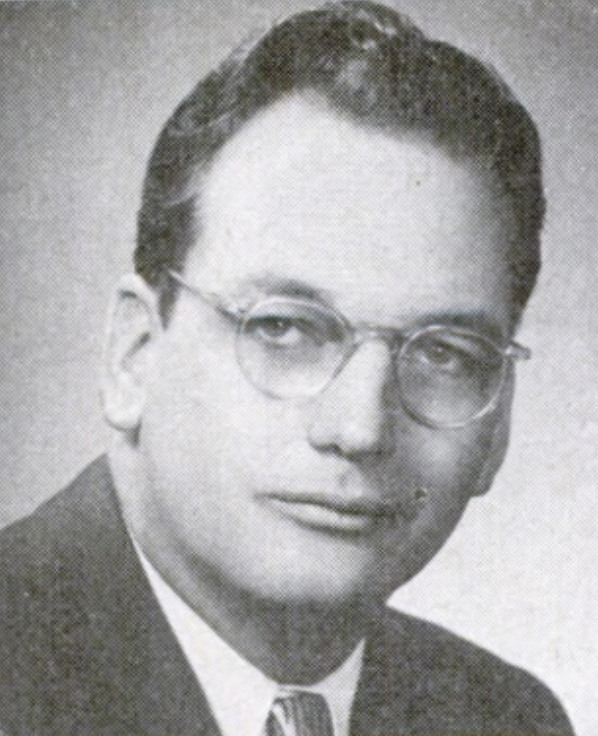

Member of the U.S. House of Representatives from Indiana's 3rd district
- In office January 3, 1951 – January 3, 1957
- Preceded by: Thurman C. Crook
- Succeeded by: F. Jay Nimtz

Personal details
- Born: February 13, 1917 South Bend, Indiana, US
- Died: October 14, 1986 (aged 69) South Bend, Indiana, US
- Resting place: Riverview Cemetery
- Party: Republican
- Education: Northwestern University
- Profession: Attorney

Shepard J. Crumpacker Jr. (February 13, 1917 – October 14, 1986) was an American lawyer, jurist, World War II veteran, and politician who served three terms as a U.S. representative from Indiana from 1951 to 1957.

He was a cousin of Edgar D. Crumpacker and Maurice E. Crumpacker.

== Early life and career ==
Crumpacker was born in South Bend, Indiana, where he attended the public schools. Crumpacker graduated from Northwestern University in 1938, and from the University of Michigan Law School in 1941. He was admitted to the bar the same year and commenced the practice of law in South Bend.

Crumpacker owned and operated a farm and served as delegate to Indiana State Republican conventions from 1958 through 1970.

=== World War II ===
Crumpacker entered the United States Army Air Corps as a private on September 26, 1941, during World War II, and advanced through the ranks to flight chief in a fighter squadron. Crumpacker was commissioned as a lieutenant in 1943 and assigned to heavy-bomber maintenance. Crumpacker was Relieved from active duty as a first lieutenant on March 1, 1946, and thereafter was a major in the United States Air Force Reserve.

== Congress ==
Crumpacker was elected as a Republican to the Eighty-second, Eighty-third, and Eighty-fourth Congresses (January 3, 1951 – January 3, 1957). He did not seek renomination in 1956.

== Later career and death ==
Crumpacker practiced law until 1977, when he was appointed judge of the St. Joseph Superior Court and served until 1985. He was a resident of South Bend, Indiana, until his death there on October 14, 1986. He is interred in Riverview Cemetery.

U.S. House of Representatives
Preceded by Thurman C. Crook	Member of the U.S. House of Representatives from Indiana's 3rd congressional district 1951–1957	Succeeded by F. Jay Nimtz
