= Jonas G. Howard =

American politician (1825–1911)

Member of the U.S. House of Representatives from Indiana's 3rd district
- In office March 4, 1885 – March 3, 1889
- Preceded by: Strother M. Stockslager
- Succeeded by: Jason B. Brown

Member of the Indiana House of Representatives
- In office 1863-1866

Personal details
- Born: Jonas George Howard; May 22, 1825 New Albany, Indiana
- Died: October 5, 1911 (aged 86) Jeffersonville, Indiana
- Resting place: Walnut Ridge Cemetery
- Party: Democratic
- Education: De Pauw University, Indiana University

Jonas George Howard (May 22, 1825 – October 5, 1911) was an American lawyer and politician who served two terms as a U.S. representative from Indiana from 1885 to 1889.

== Early life and career ==
Born on a farm near New Albany, Indiana, Howard attended private school, Indiana Asbury College (now De Pauw University), Greencastle, Indiana, and Louisville (Kentucky) Law School.

=== Legal career ===
Howard graduated from the law department of Indiana University at Bloomington in 1851. He was admitted to the bar in 1852 and commenced the practice of law in Jeffersonville, Indiana.

Howard served as the city attorney of Jeffersonville in 1854, 1865, from 1871 to 1873, and again from 1877 to 1879.

=== Early political career ===
He served as a member of the city council from 1859 to 1863. He served as a member of the State house of representatives from 1863 to 1866.

== Congress ==
Howard was elected as a Democrat to the Forty-ninth and Fiftieth Congresses (March 4, 1885 – March 3, 1889). He was an unsuccessful candidate for renomination in 1888.

== Later career and death ==
He returned to Jeffersonville, Indiana, where he resumed the practice of law. He also engaged in agricultural pursuits.

He died in Jeffersonville, Indiana, October 5, 1911. He was interred in Walnut Ridge Cemetery.

U.S. House of Representatives
Preceded by Strother M. Stockslager	Member of the U.S. House of Representatives from Indiana's 3rd congressional district 1885-1889	Succeeded by Jason B. Brown
