= F. Jay Nimtz =

American politician (1915–1990)

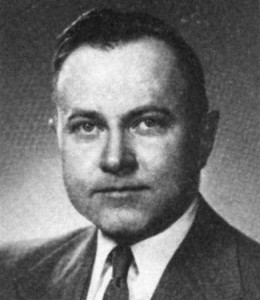

Member of the U.S. House of Representatives from Indiana's 3rd district
- In office January 3, 1957 – January 3, 1959
- Preceded by: Shepard J. Crumpacker, Jr.
- Succeeded by: John Brademas

Personal details
- Born: Floyd Jay Nimtz; December 1, 1915 South Bend, Indiana, U.S.
- Died: December 6, 1990 (aged 75) South Bend, Indiana, U.S.
- Resting place: Riverview Cemetery; South Bend, Indiana, U.S.
- Education: Indiana University (BA); Indiana University Maurer School of Law

F. Jay Nimtz (December 1, 1915 – December 6, 1990) was an American lawyer, World War II veteran and politician who served one term as a U.S. representative from Indiana from 1957 to 1959.

== Early life and career ==
Nimtz was born in South Bend, Indiana, the youngest child of Frederick and Bertha Baske Nimtz; his father and maternal grandparents were German immigrants. Nimtz attended South Bend public schools, graduating from Central High School in 1933. He graduated from Indiana University with a Bachelor of Arts degree in 1938 and from the Indiana University Maurer School of Law with in 1940. He was admitted to the bar in 1940 and commenced the practice of law in South Bend, Indiana.

== Military career ==
Nimtz was inducted in the United States Army as a private on June 13, 1941, serving until February 14, 1947, and attaining the rank of lieutenant colonel. His tour of duty took him overseas to England, France and Germany. He served fourteen months as assistant executive officer for the Office of United States Chief of Counsel for Prosecution of Axis Criminality (OCCPAC).

== Career after the war ==
Upon returning home after the war, Nimtz served as a colonel in the United States Army Reserve. He also resumed the practice of law. He served as member of the board of directors of the Saint Joseph County Department of Public Welfare and was an unsuccessful candidate in 1947 for South Bend city judge and in 1948 for Saint Joseph Count prosecutor.

=== Congress ===
Nimtz was elected as a Republican to the Eighty-fifth Congress (January 3, 1957 – January 3, 1959). He voted in favor of the Civil Rights Act of 1957. He was an unsuccessful candidate for reelection in 1958 to the Eighty-sixth Congress and in 1960 to the Eighty-seventh Congress. In 1958 he co-sponsored legislation in Congress creating the Lincoln Sesquicentennial Commission, to which he was subsequently appointed vice-chairman.

== Later career and death ==
After his term in Congress, Nimtz attended the United States Army Command and General Staff College, graduating in 1965. He served as member of the Indiana Air Pollution Control Board from 1979 to 1986 and the Indiana Environmental Management Board from 1981 to 1986. He also served as president of the South Bend Redevelopment Commission from 1974 until his death.

Nimtz died in South Bend, on December 6, 1990. He is buried at Riverview Cemetery in South Bend. F. J. Nimtz Parkway in South Bend is named in his honor.

U.S. House of Representatives
Preceded by Shepard J. Crumpacker, Jr.	Member of the U.S. House of Representatives from Indiana's 3rd congressional district 1957–1959	Succeeded by John Brademas
