= Frank Gardner (politician) =

American politician

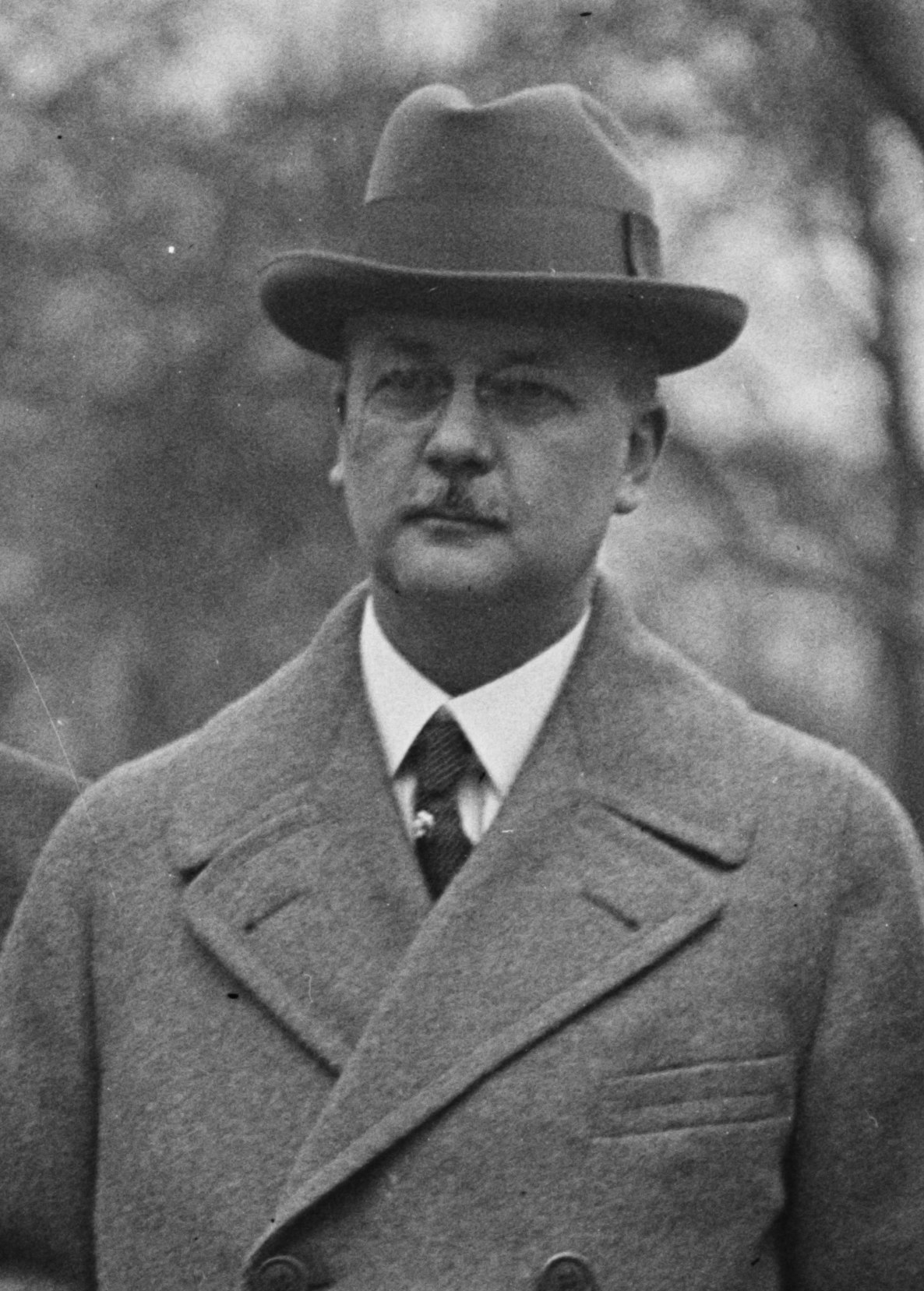

Member of the U.S. House of Representatives from Indiana's 3rd district
- In office March 4, 1923 – March 3, 1929
- Preceded by: James W. Dunbar
- Succeeded by: James W. Dunbar

Personal details
- Born: May 8, 1872
- Died: February 1, 1937 (aged 64)
- Education: Indiana University Bloomington
- Occupation: Lawyer

Frank Gardner (May 8, 1872 – February 1, 1937) was an American lawyer and politician who served three terms as a U.S. representative from Indiana from 1923 to 1929.

== Biography ==
He was born on a farm in Finley Township, near Scottsburg, Indiana, and attended the rural schools. He graduated from the Borden Institute, Clark County, Indiana, in 1896 and from the law department of Indiana University Bloomington in 1900. He was admitted to the bar in 1900 and started practicing law in Scottsburg, Indiana. He was the auditor of Scott County from 1903 to 1911, the county attorney from 1911, a member of the Democratic county committee and its chairman from 1912 to 1922, and a field examiner for the State Board of Accounts from 1911 to 1920.

=== Congress ===
Gardner was elected as a Democrat to the Sixty-Eighth Congress in 1922. His predecessor in the district, Republican James W. Dunbar, had chosen not to run for reelection. Gardner was reelected to the Sixty-Ninth and Seventieth Congresses (March 4, 1923 – March 3, 1929).

=== Later career and death ===
In 1928, James W. Dunbar ran for election to his former seat and defeated Gardner. Gardner resumed practicing law in Scottsburg, Indiana. In 1930 he was elected judge of the sixth judicial circuit of Indiana in 1930. He was reelected in 1936 and served until his death in Scottsburg, Indiana, on February 1, 1937. He was interred in Scottsburg Cemetery.

U.S. House of Representatives
Preceded by James W. Dunbar	Member of the U.S. House of Representatives from Indiana's 3rd congressional district 1923–1929	Succeeded by James W. Dunbar
