= Strother M. Stockslager =

American politician (1842–1930)

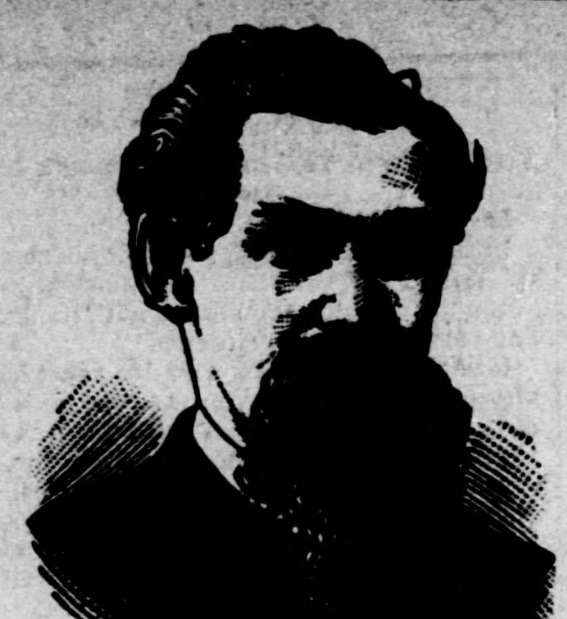

Member of the U.S. House of Representatives from Indiana's 3rd district
- In office March 4, 1881 – March 3, 1885
- Preceded by: George A. Bicknell
- Succeeded by: Jonas G. Howard

Member of the Indiana Senate
- In office 1874–1878

Personal details
- Born: Strother Madison Stockslager; May 7, 1842 Mauckport, Indiana, US
- Died: June 1, 1930 (aged 88) Washington, D.C., US
- Resting place: Arlington National Cemetery
- Party: Democratic
- Education: Indiana University

Strother Madison Stockslager (May 7, 1842 – June 1, 1930) was an American lawyer, Civil War veteran, and politician who served two terms as a U.S. representative from Indiana from 1881 to 1885.

== Biography ==
Born in Mauckport, Indiana, Stockslager attended the common schools, Corydon High School, and Indiana University at Bloomington. He taught school.

=== Civil War ===
He served in the Union Army during the Civil War as second lieutenant and captain in the Thirteenth Indiana Volunteer Cavalry, which he had assisted to organize. He was mustered out as captain and returned to Mauckport.

=== Early career ===
He served as Deputy county auditor of Harrison County, 1866–1868, then as Deputy county clerk of Harrison County, 1868–1870.

He was appointed by President Andrew Johnson as assessor of internal revenue in 1867, but was not confirmed by the United States Senate. He studied law. He was admitted to the bar in Corydon, Indiana, in 1871 and practiced in Indiana and Kentucky. He served as member of the State senate 1874–1878. He was editor of the Corydon Democrat 1879–1882.

=== Congress ===
Stockslager was elected as a Democrat to the Forty-seventh and Forty-eighth Congresses (March 4, 1881 – March 3, 1885). He served as chairman of the Committee on Public Buildings and Grounds (Forty-eighth Congress). He was an unsuccessful candidate for renomination in 1884 to the Forty-ninth Congress.

=== Later career ===
He resumed the practice of law in Corydon. He was appointed assistant commissioner of the General Land Office on October 1, 1885, and commissioner on March 27, 1888. He resigned March 4, 1889, but remained in charge until June 20, 1889. He continued the practice of law in Washington, D.C.

He was an unsuccessful Democratic candidate for election in 1894 to the Fifty-fourth Congress. He served as delegate to the Democratic National Convention in 1896. He served as legal expert in the Department of Labor in 1918.

== Death and burial ==
He resumed the practice of law in Washington, D.C., where he died on June 1, 1930. He was interred in Arlington National Cemetery.

U.S. House of Representatives
Preceded by George A. Bicknell	Member of the U.S. House of Representatives from Indiana's 3rd congressional district 1881–1885	Succeeded by Jonas G. Howard
Political offices
Preceded by William A. J. Sparks	Commissioner of the General Land Office; March 27, 1888-September 16, 1889	Succeeded by Lewis A. Groff
